= 2008 WTA Tour =

Women's tennis circuit

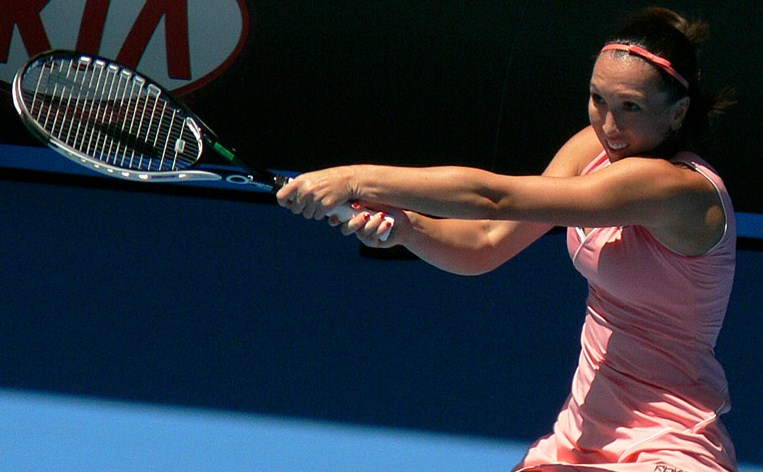
- Jelena Janković finished the year as WTA world No. 1 for the first time in her career, though Serena Williams was named the Player of the Year. Janković won four tournaments during the season, including two Tier I events, and finished runner-up at a major at the US Open. Williams won four tournaments during the season, including a major at the US Open, and two Tier I events.

Details
- Duration: December 29, 2007 – November 9, 2008
- Edition: 38th
- Tournaments: 59
- Categories: Grand Slam (4); WTA Championships; Summer Olympics; WTA Tier I (9); WTA Tier II (14); WTA Tier III (17); WTA Tier IV (13)

Achievements (singles)
- Most titles: (United States) Serena Williams (4) (Russia) Dinara Safina (4) (Serbia) Jelena Janković (4)
- Most finals: (Russia) Vera Zvonareva (8)
- Prize money leader: (United States) Serena Williams (US$3,852,173)
- Points leader: (Serbia) Jelena Janković (4,786)

Awards
- Player of the year: (United States) Serena Williams
- Doubles team of the year: (Zimbabwe) Cara Black (United States) Liezel Huber
- Most improved player of the year: (Russia) Dinara Safina
- Newcomer of the year: (Denmark) Caroline Wozniacki
- Comeback player of the year: (China) Zheng Jie

The 2008 Sony Ericsson WTA Tour was the elite professional tennis circuit organized by the Women's Tennis Association (WTA) for the 2008 tennis season. The 2008 WTA Tour calendar comprises the Grand Slam tournaments (supervised by the International Tennis Federation (ITF)), the WTA Tier I-IV Events, the Fed Cup (organized by the ITF), the year-end championships, and the tennis event at the Beijing Summer Olympic Games.

The season was characterised by its frequent changes in the world No. 1 ranking, with Justine Henin, Maria Sharapova, Ana Ivanovic, Jelena Janković and Serena Williams all holding the position at some point during the season. Janković finished the season as the world No. 1 player despite not winning a Grand Slam tournament. She did however reach the final of the U.S. Open, and won four tournaments throughout the season.

Four players won the Grand Slam titles. Maria Sharapova won her third major title at the Australian Open, Ana Ivanovic won her maiden title at the French Open, Venus Williams won her seventh Grand Slam title at Wimbledon, and Serena Williams won her ninth Grand Slam title at the U.S. Open. Dinara Safina also reached her first Grand Slam final at the French Open, and won four events during the season.

One of the big stories of the year was the shock retirement of Justine Henin on May 14, less than two weeks before she was set to defend her French Open title. She became the first player to retire while ranked at No. 1 in the world. Henin later returned for the 2010 season.

== Summary ==
Justine Henin started the season as the No. 1 ranked player in the world. Following her impressive 2007 season and victory at the warm-up tournament in Sydney, she was considered the outright favourite to win the Australian Open. However, she was beaten in emphatic fashion by Maria Sharapova in the quarterfinals, who then defeated Jelena Janković and Ana Ivanovic to win her third Grand Slam title. Daniela Hantuchová also reached her first Grand Slam semifinal. Sister team Alona and Kateryna Bondarenko pulled off an unexpected title run in the women's doubles, while Sun Tiantian teamed up with Nenad Zimonjić to win her first Grand Slam tournament of any kind in the mixed doubles event.

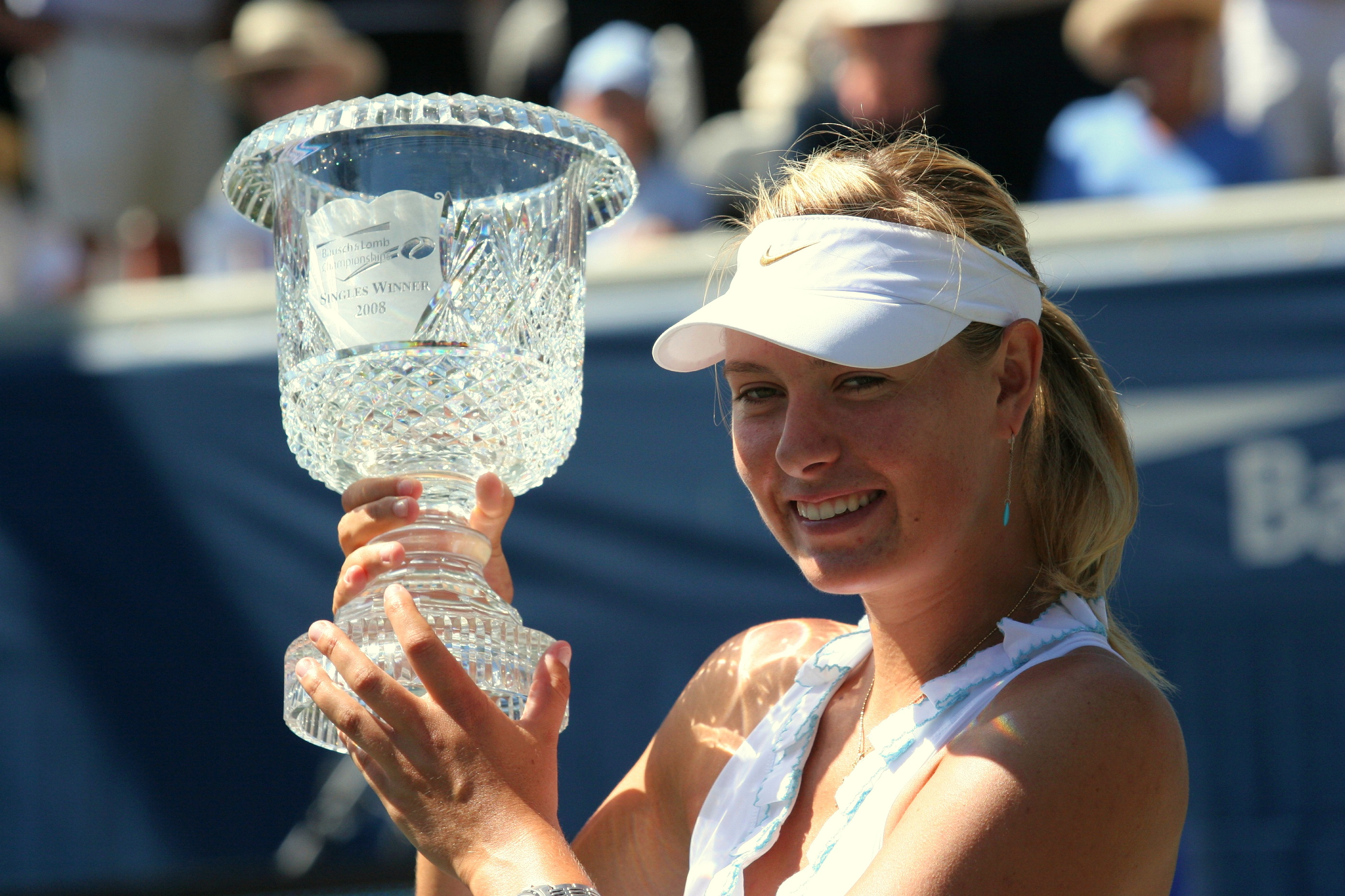
Maria Sharapova started the year on an 18-match winning streak.

Sharapova continued to impress by winning the tournament in Doha, before her 18-match win streak was snapped by Svetlana Kuznetsova in the semifinals of Indian Wells. Kuznetsova went on to lose to Ivanovic in the final. It was then the turn of Serena Williams to build a win streak, claiming the titles in Bangalore, Miami—her fifth title at the event, tying Steffi Graf for the most singles titles at this tournament—and then Charleston. Her 17-match winning run was eventually ended in Berlin by Dinara Safina, who had already beaten Henin in that tournament, and subsequently went on to lift the title.

During the Rome tournament Henin announced her shock retirement from professional tennis, becoming the first player ever to retire whilst ranked at No. 1 in the world. Henin's removal from the rankings meant that then-No. 2 Maria Sharapova became the new No. 1 by default. Jelena Janković eventually won the tournament in Rome.

With Henin's retirement the French Open was considered to be wide open. World No. 1 Sharapova was stopped by Safina in the fourth round, who fought back from match points down to win, before doing the same against Elena Dementieva in the quarterfinals. She eventually reached her first Grand Slam final. On the other side of the draw Ana Ivanovic came through after an all-Serbian semifinal with Jelena Janković, which meant that Ivanovic would move to the No. 1 position regardless of the result in the final. She ended up beating Safina for her first Slam title. In the women's doubles tournament Anabel Medina Garrigues and Virginia Ruano Pascual were victorious, the first Slam for Medina Garrigues and the tenth for Ruano Pascual. Victoria Azarenka won her second Grand Slam in the mixed doubles event.

The third Grand Slam of the year at Wimbledon brought with it some surprises: for the first time in the Open Era none of the top four seeds managed to reach the semifinals. World No. 1 Ivanovic surrendered to Zheng Jie in the third round, who went on to become the first Chinese women to reach the semifinals of a Grand Slam in singles. Tamarine Tanasugarn knocked out Janković en route to her only major quarterfinal. Sharapova was upset by Alla Kudryavtseva, and Kuznetsova lost to Agnieszka Radwańska, who had shown prior form winning the warm-up tournament in Eastbourne. Serena Williams and her sister Venus Williams reached the final, the first Grand Slam final between the two since Wimbledon five years ago. Venus would defeat her sister for her fifth Wimbledon title. They also teamed up to win the doubles title, their seventh as a team. In the mixed doubles event Samantha Stosur won with Bob Bryan.

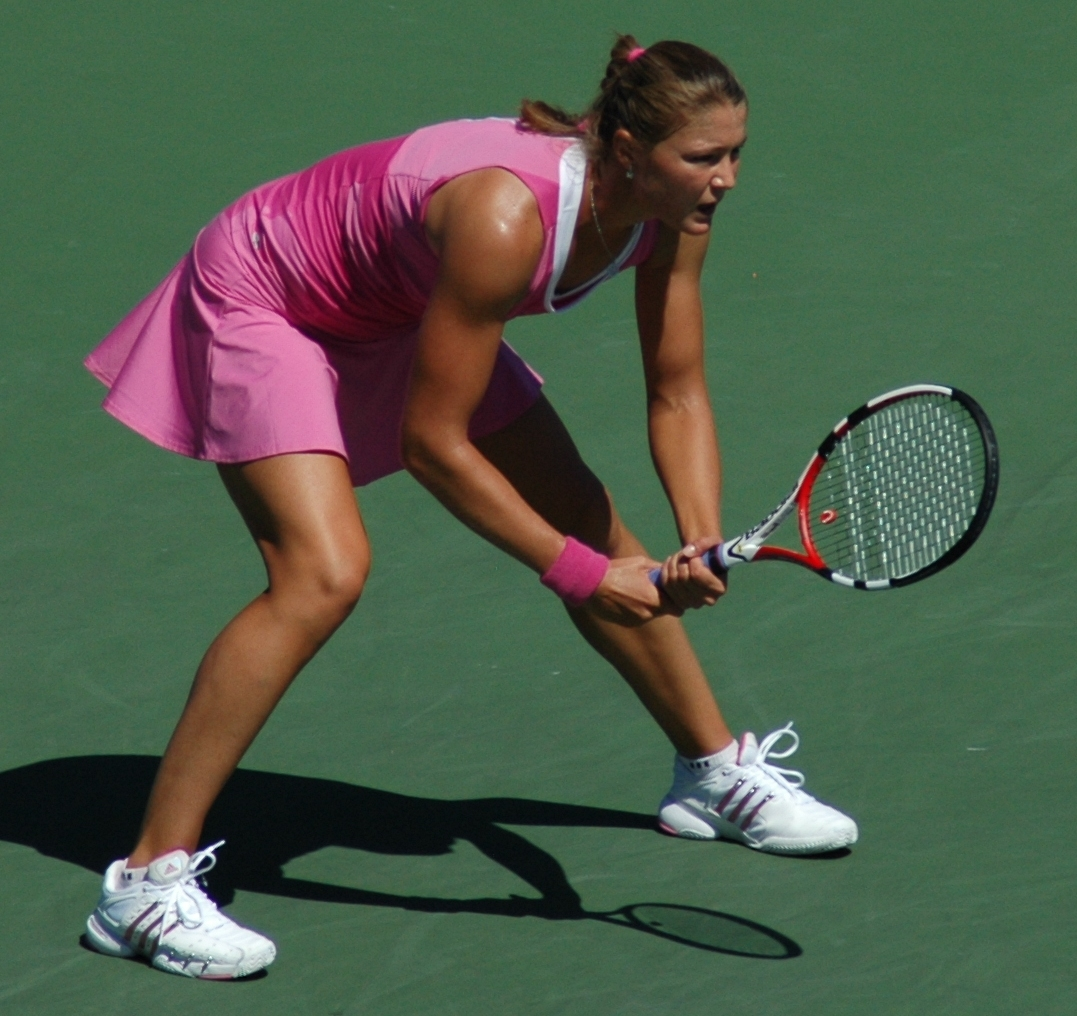
Dinara Safina won four titles and improved to No. 3 in the world during the season.

Ivanovic lost her No. 1 ranking in August, as fellow Serbian Jelena Janković ascended to the top position for the first time. Dinara Safina proved strong on the summer hardcourts, winning titles in Los Angeles and Montréal. She then made it to the final match at the Beijing Olympics, but lost to Dementieva, who achieved her biggest career victory with the gold medal. With Vera Zvonareva also winning the bronze medal it meant that Russia swept the podium in the singles event. Li Na almost made a strong run at home, but lost in the bronze medal match. In doubles Serena and Venus Williams won their second gold medals together, after winning at the Sydney Olympics in 2000.

Ivanovic regained the No. 1 position following the Olympics, and held it heading into the U.S. Open. There it was up to grabs with five women—Ivanovic, Janković, Safina, Kuznetsova, and Serena Williams—being in contention for the top spot. Ivanovic was upset in the second round by Julie Coin, one of the worst losses for a top-ranked player ever. Serena would defeat Jelena Janković in the final. By virtue of winning her eighth major title Williams ascended to the top ranking for the first time since 2002. In the doubles tournament Cara Black and Liezel Huber won their fourth Grand Slam as a team, with Black also victorious in the mixed doubles with Leander Paes.

The fall season saw Jelena Janković return to the No. 1 position after winning events in Beijing, Stuttgart and Moscow, and thus securing the year-end No. 1 ranking. Dinara Safina won the title in Tokyo, beating Petrova and Kuznetsova en route. Both had a solid indoor season with Petrova making the final of Stuttgart and winning Quebec, and Kuznetsova finishing runner-up in Beijing and Tokyo. Vera Zvonareva also had a strong finish to the year, reaching the final of Moscow and Linz, where she lost to Ivanovic, and the WTA Tour Championships in Doha, where she lost to Venus Williams. Williams won her first title at the year-end championships. Other players at the final event were semifinalists Elena Dementieva and Jelena Janković, Dinara Safina, Serena Williams, Ana Ivanovic and Svetlana Kuznetsova, plus alternates Agnieszka Radwańska and Nadia Petrova. In the doubles event Black and Huber successfully defended the title they won in 2007.

== Schedule ==
The table below shows the 2008 WTA Tour schedule.

Key

Grand Slam events
Summer Olympic Games
Year-end championships
Tier I events
Tier II events
Tier III / IV events
Team events

=== January ===
Week	Tournament	Champions	Runners-up	Semifinalists	Quarterfinalists
31 Dec	Hopman Cup; Perth, Australia; Hopman Cup; Hard (i) – A$1,000,000 – 8 teams (RR)	United States; 2–1	Serbia	Round robin losers (Group A) France; Chinese Taipei; Argentina	Round robin losers (Group B) India; Australia; Czech Republic
31 Dec	Mondial Australian Women's Hardcourts; Gold Coast, Australia; Tier III event Hard – $175,000 – 32S/32Q/16D; Singles – Doubles	(China) Li Na; 4–6, 6–3, 6–4	(Belarus) Victoria Azarenka	(Switzerland) Patty Schnyder (Israel) Shahar Pe'er	(Czech Republic) Nicole Vaidišová (France) Amélie Mauresmo (Russia) Dinara Safina (Slovakia) Dominika Cibulková
31 Dec	Mondial Australian Women's Hardcourts; Gold Coast, Australia; Tier III event Hard – $175,000 – 32S/32Q/16D; Singles – Doubles	(Russia) Dinara Safina (Hungary) Ágnes Szávay; 6–1, 6–2	(China) Yan Zi (China) Zheng Jie	(Switzerland) Patty Schnyder (Israel) Shahar Pe'er	(Czech Republic) Nicole Vaidišová (France) Amélie Mauresmo (Russia) Dinara Safina (Slovakia) Dominika Cibulková
31 Dec	ASB Classic; Auckland, New Zealand; Tier IV event Hard – $145,000 – 32S/32Q/16D; Singles – Doubles	(United States) Lindsay Davenport; 6–2, 6–2	(France) Aravane Rezaï	(New Zealand) Marina Erakovic (Austria) Tamira Paszek	(Russia) Vera Zvonareva (Slovenia) Katarina Srebotnik (Italy) Sara Errani (Russia) Maria Kirilenko
31 Dec	ASB Classic; Auckland, New Zealand; Tier IV event Hard – $145,000 – 32S/32Q/16D; Singles – Doubles	(Ukraine) Mariya Koryttseva (United States) Lilia Osterloh; 6–3, 6–4	(Germany) Martina Müller (Czech Republic) Barbora Záhlavová-Strýcová	(New Zealand) Marina Erakovic (Austria) Tamira Paszek	(Russia) Vera Zvonareva (Slovenia) Katarina Srebotnik (Italy) Sara Errani (Russia) Maria Kirilenko
7 Jan	Medibank International; Sydney, Australia; Tier II event Hard – $600,000 – 28S/32Q/16D; Singles – Doubles	(Belgium) Justine Henin; 4–6, 6–2, 6–4	(Russia) Svetlana Kuznetsova	(Serbia) Ana Ivanovic (Czech Republic) Nicole Vaidišová	(Estonia) Kaia Kanepi (Slovenia) Katarina Srebotnik (Serbia) Jelena Janković (Italy) Francesca Schiavone
7 Jan	Medibank International; Sydney, Australia; Tier II event Hard – $600,000 – 28S/32Q/16D; Singles – Doubles	(China) Yan Zi (China) Zheng Jie; 6–4, 7–6^{(7–5)}	(Ukraine) Tatiana Perebiynis (Belarus) Tatiana Poutchek	(Serbia) Ana Ivanovic (Czech Republic) Nicole Vaidišová	(Estonia) Kaia Kanepi (Slovenia) Katarina Srebotnik (Serbia) Jelena Janković (Italy) Francesca Schiavone
7 Jan	Moorilla Hobart International; Hobart, Australia; Tier IV event Hard – $170,000 – 32S/32Q/16D; Singles – Doubles	(Greece) Eleni Daniilidou; Walkover	(Russia) Vera Zvonareva	(Italy) Flavia Pennetta (United States) Ashley Harkleroad	(Australia) Casey Dellacqua (India) Sania Mirza (Romania) Edina Gallovits (Russia) Elena Vesnina
7 Jan	Moorilla Hobart International; Hobart, Australia; Tier IV event Hard – $170,000 – 32S/32Q/16D; Singles – Doubles	(Spain) Anabel Medina Garrigues (Spain) Virginia Ruano Pascual; 6–2, 6–4	(Greece) Eleni Daniilidou (Germany) Jasmin Wöhr	(Italy) Flavia Pennetta (United States) Ashley Harkleroad	(Australia) Casey Dellacqua (India) Sania Mirza (Romania) Edina Gallovits (Russia) Elena Vesnina
14 Jan; 21 Jan	Australian Open; Melbourne, Australia; Grand Slam; Hard – $8,000,000 – 128S/96Q/64D/32X; Singles – Doubles – Mixed doubles	(Russia) Maria Sharapova; 7–5, 6–3	(Serbia) Ana Ivanovic	(Serbia) Jelena Janković (Slovakia) Daniela Hantuchová	(Belgium) Justine Henin (United States) Serena Williams (United States) Venus Williams (Poland) Agnieszka Radwańska
14 Jan; 21 Jan	Australian Open; Melbourne, Australia; Grand Slam; Hard – $8,000,000 – 128S/96Q/64D/32X; Singles – Doubles – Mixed doubles	(Ukraine) Alona Bondarenko (Ukraine) Kateryna Bondarenko; 2–6, 6–1, 6–4	(Belarus) Victoria Azarenka (Israel) Shahar Pe'er	(Serbia) Jelena Janković (Slovakia) Daniela Hantuchová	(Belgium) Justine Henin (United States) Serena Williams (United States) Venus Williams (Poland) Agnieszka Radwańska
14 Jan; 21 Jan	Australian Open; Melbourne, Australia; Grand Slam; Hard – $8,000,000 – 128S/96Q/64D/32X; Singles – Doubles – Mixed doubles	(Serbia) Nenad Zimonjić (China) Sun Tiantian; 7–6^{(7–4)}, 6–4	(India) Mahesh Bhupathi (India) Sania Mirza	(Serbia) Jelena Janković (Slovakia) Daniela Hantuchová	(Belgium) Justine Henin (United States) Serena Williams (United States) Venus Williams (Poland) Agnieszka Radwańska
28 Jan	Fed Cup: Quarterfinals; HaSharon, Israel, hard California, United States, hard Beijing, China, hard (i); Naples, Italy, hard (i)	First round winners Russia 4–1; United States 4–1; China 3–2; Spain 3–2	First round losers Israel; Germany; France; Italy		

=== February ===
Week	Tournament	Champions	Runners-up	Semifinalists	Quarterfinalists
4 Feb	Open Gaz de France; Paris, France; Tier II event Hard (i) – $600,000 – 28S/32Q/16D; Singles – Doubles	(Russia) Anna Chakvetadze; 6–3, 2–6, 6–2	(Hungary) Ágnes Szávay	(France) Marion Bartoli (Russia) Elena Dementieva	(France) Amélie Mauresmo (France) Virginie Razzano (Ukraine) Kateryna Bondarenko (Slovakia) Daniela Hantuchová
4 Feb	Open Gaz de France; Paris, France; Tier II event Hard (i) – $600,000 – 28S/32Q/16D; Singles – Doubles	(Ukraine) Alona Bondarenko (Ukraine) Kateryna Bondarenko; 6–1, 6–4	(Czech Republic) Eva Hrdinová (Czech Republic) Vladimíra Uhlířová	(France) Marion Bartoli (Russia) Elena Dementieva	(France) Amélie Mauresmo (France) Virginie Razzano (Ukraine) Kateryna Bondarenko (Slovakia) Daniela Hantuchová
4 Feb	Pattaya Women's Open; Pattaya, Thailand; Tier IV event Hard – $170,000 – 32S/32Q/16D; Singles – Doubles	(Poland) Agnieszka Radwańska; 6–2, 1–6, 7–6^{(7–4)}	(United States) Jill Craybas	(Russia) Ekaterina Bychkova (Uzbekistan) Akgul Amanmuradova	(Thailand) Tamarine Tanasugarn (Russia) Vesna Manasieva (Chinese Taipei) Chan Yung-jan (Slovenia) Andreja Klepač
4 Feb	Pattaya Women's Open; Pattaya, Thailand; Tier IV event Hard – $170,000 – 32S/32Q/16D; Singles – Doubles	(Chinese Taipei) Chan Yung-jan (Chinese Taipei) Chuang Chia-jung; 6–4, 6–3	(Chinese Taipei) Hsieh Su-wei (United States) Vania King	(Russia) Ekaterina Bychkova (Uzbekistan) Akgul Amanmuradova	(Thailand) Tamarine Tanasugarn (Russia) Vesna Manasieva (Chinese Taipei) Chan Yung-jan (Slovenia) Andreja Klepač
11 Feb	Proximus Diamond Games; Antwerp, Belgium; Tier II event Hard (i) – $600,000 – 28S/32Q/16D; Singles – Doubles	(Belgium) Justine Henin; 6–3, 6–3	(Italy) Karin Knapp	(Switzerland) Timea Bacsinszky (China) Li Na	(Russia) Alisa Kleybanova (Slovakia) Daniela Hantuchová (Switzerland) Patty Schnyder (Sweden) Sofia Arvidsson
11 Feb	Proximus Diamond Games; Antwerp, Belgium; Tier II event Hard (i) – $600,000 – 28S/32Q/16D; Singles – Doubles	(Zimbabwe) Cara Black (United States) Liezel Huber; 6–1, 6–3	(Czech Republic) Květa Peschke (Japan) Ai Sugiyama	(Switzerland) Timea Bacsinszky (China) Li Na	(Russia) Alisa Kleybanova (Slovakia) Daniela Hantuchová (Switzerland) Patty Schnyder (Sweden) Sofia Arvidsson
11 Feb	Cachantún Cup; Viña del Mar, Chile; Tier III event Clay (red) – $200,000 – 32S/32Q/16D; Singles – Doubles	(Italy) Flavia Pennetta; 6–4, 5–4 ret.	(Czech Republic) Klára Zakopalová	(France) Pauline Parmentier (Ukraine) Mariya Koryttseva	(Estonia) Kaia Kanepi (Germany) Martina Müller (Spain) Nuria Llagostera Vives (Spain) Lourdes Domínguez Lino
11 Feb	Cachantún Cup; Viña del Mar, Chile; Tier III event Clay (red) – $200,000 – 32S/32Q/16D; Singles – Doubles	(Latvia) Līga Dekmeijere (Poland) Alicja Rosolska; 7–5, 6–3	(Ukraine) Mariya Koryttseva (Germany) Julia Schruff	(France) Pauline Parmentier (Ukraine) Mariya Koryttseva	(Estonia) Kaia Kanepi (Germany) Martina Müller (Spain) Nuria Llagostera Vives (Spain) Lourdes Domínguez Lino
18 Feb	Qatar Total Open; Doha, Qatar; Tier I event Hard – $2,500,000 – 56S/32Q/28D; Singles – Doubles	(Russia) Maria Sharapova; 6–1, 2–6, 6–0	(Russia) Vera Zvonareva	(Poland) Agnieszka Radwańska (China) Li Na	(Slovakia) Dominika Cibulková (Denmark) Caroline Wozniacki (Serbia) Jelena Janković (Austria) Sybille Bammer
18 Feb	Qatar Total Open; Doha, Qatar; Tier I event Hard – $2,500,000 – 56S/32Q/28D; Singles – Doubles	(Czech Republic) Květa Peschke (Australia) Rennae Stubbs; 6–1, 5–7, [10–7]	(Zimbabwe) Cara Black (United States) Liezel Huber	(Poland) Agnieszka Radwańska (China) Li Na	(Slovakia) Dominika Cibulková (Denmark) Caroline Wozniacki (Serbia) Jelena Janković (Austria) Sybille Bammer
18 Feb	XVI Copa Colsanitas Santander; Bogotá, Colombia; Tier III event Clay (red) – $185,000 – 32S/32Q/16D; Singles – Doubles	(Spain) Nuria Llagostera Vives; 6–0, 6–4	(Argentina) María Emilia Salerni	(Argentina) Betina Jozami (Spain) Carla Suárez Navarro	(Germany) Martina Müller (Italy) Sara Errani (Colombia) Catalina Castaño (Colombia) Mariana Duque Mariño
18 Feb	XVI Copa Colsanitas Santander; Bogotá, Colombia; Tier III event Clay (red) – $185,000 – 32S/32Q/16D; Singles – Doubles	(Czech Republic) Iveta Benešová (United States) Bethanie Mattek; 6–3, 6–3	(Croatia) Jelena Kostanić Tošić (Germany) Martina Müller	(Argentina) Betina Jozami (Spain) Carla Suárez Navarro	(Germany) Martina Müller (Italy) Sara Errani (Colombia) Catalina Castaño (Colombia) Mariana Duque Mariño
25 Feb	Barclays Dubai Tennis Championships; Dubai, United Arab Emirates; Tier II event Hard – $1,500,000 – 28S/48Q/16D; Singles – Doubles	(Russia) Elena Dementieva; 4–6, 6–3, 6–2	(Russia) Svetlana Kuznetsova	(Italy) Francesca Schiavone (Serbia) Jelena Janković	(Belgium) Justine Henin (Serbia) Ana Ivanovic (Russia) Anna Chakvetadze (France) Amélie Mauresmo
25 Feb	Barclays Dubai Tennis Championships; Dubai, United Arab Emirates; Tier II event Hard – $1,500,000 – 28S/48Q/16D; Singles – Doubles	(Zimbabwe) Cara Black (United States) Liezel Huber; 7–5, 6–2	(China) Yan Zi (China) Zheng Jie	(Italy) Francesca Schiavone (Serbia) Jelena Janković	(Belgium) Justine Henin (Serbia) Ana Ivanovic (Russia) Anna Chakvetadze (France) Amélie Mauresmo
25 Feb	Abierto Mexicano Telcel; Acapulco, Mexico; Tier III event Clay (red) – $180,000 – 32S/16Q/16D; Singles – Doubles	(Italy) Flavia Pennetta; 6–0, 4–6, 6–1	(France) Alizé Cornet	(Estonia) Kaia Kanepi (United States) Jill Craybas	(Romania) Edina Gallovits (Romania) Sorana Cîrstea (Czech Republic) Iveta Benešová (Ukraine) Mariya Koryttseva
25 Feb	Abierto Mexicano Telcel; Acapulco, Mexico; Tier III event Clay (red) – $180,000 – 32S/16Q/16D; Singles – Doubles	(Spain) Nuria Llagostera Vives (Spain) María José Martínez Sánchez; 6–2, 6–4	(Czech Republic) Iveta Benešová (Czech Republic) Petra Cetkovská	(Estonia) Kaia Kanepi (United States) Jill Craybas	(Romania) Edina Gallovits (Romania) Sorana Cîrstea (Czech Republic) Iveta Benešová (Ukraine) Mariya Koryttseva
25 Feb	Cellular South Cup; Memphis, United States; Tier III event Hard (i) – $175,000 – 32S/32Q/16D; Singles – Doubles	(United States) Lindsay Davenport; 6–2, 6–1	(Belarus) Olga Govortsova	(New Zealand) Marina Erakovic (Israel) Shahar Pe'er	(Russia) Alla Kudryavtseva (Denmark) Caroline Wozniacki (Sweden) Sofia Arvidsson (Germany) Julia Görges
25 Feb	Cellular South Cup; Memphis, United States; Tier III event Hard (i) – $175,000 – 32S/32Q/16D; Singles – Doubles	(United States) Lindsay Davenport (United States) Lisa Raymond; 6–3, 6–1	(United States) Angela Haynes (United States) Mashona Washington	(New Zealand) Marina Erakovic (Israel) Shahar Pe'er	(Russia) Alla Kudryavtseva (Denmark) Caroline Wozniacki (Sweden) Sofia Arvidsson (Germany) Julia Görges

=== March ===
Week	Tournament	Champions	Runners-up	Semifinalists	Quarterfinalists
3 Mar	Canara Bank Bangalore Open; Bangalore, India; Tier II event Hard – $600,000 – 28S/32Q/16D; Singles – Doubles	(United States) Serena Williams; 7–5, 6–3	(Switzerland) Patty Schnyder	(China) Yan Zi (United States) Venus Williams	(Serbia) Jelena Janković (Uzbekistan) Akgul Amanmuradova (Russia) Anastasia Rodionova (Russia) Vera Zvonareva
3 Mar	Canara Bank Bangalore Open; Bangalore, India; Tier II event Hard – $600,000 – 28S/32Q/16D; Singles – Doubles	(China) Peng Shuai (China) Sun Tiantian; 6–4, 5–7, [10–8]	(Chinese Taipei) Chan Yung-jan (Chinese Taipei) Chuang Chia-jung	(China) Yan Zi (United States) Venus Williams	(Serbia) Jelena Janković (Uzbekistan) Akgul Amanmuradova (Russia) Anastasia Rodionova (Russia) Vera Zvonareva
10 Mar; 17 Mar	Pacific Life Open; Indian Wells, United States; Tier I event Hard – $2,100,000 – 96S/48Q/32D; Singles – Doubles	(Serbia) Ana Ivanovic; 6–4, 6–3	(Russia) Svetlana Kuznetsova	(Serbia) Jelena Janković (Russia) Maria Sharapova	(Russia) Vera Zvonareva (United States) Lindsay Davenport (Slovakia) Daniela Hantuchová (Poland) Agnieszka Radwańska
10 Mar; 17 Mar	Pacific Life Open; Indian Wells, United States; Tier I event Hard – $2,100,000 – 96S/48Q/32D; Singles – Doubles	(Russia) Dinara Safina (Russia) Elena Vesnina; 6–1, 1–6, [10–8]	(China) Yan Zi (China) Zheng Jie	(Serbia) Jelena Janković (Russia) Maria Sharapova	(Russia) Vera Zvonareva (United States) Lindsay Davenport (Slovakia) Daniela Hantuchová (Poland) Agnieszka Radwańska
24 Mar; 31 Mar	Sony Ericsson Open; Key Biscayne, United States; Tier I event Hard – $3,770,000 – 96S/48Q/32D; Singles – Doubles	(United States) Serena Williams; 6–1, 5–7, 6–3	(Serbia) Jelena Janković	(Russia) Svetlana Kuznetsova (Russia) Vera Zvonareva	(Belgium) Justine Henin (United States) Venus Williams (Russia) Elena Dementieva (Russia) Dinara Safina
24 Mar; 31 Mar	Sony Ericsson Open; Key Biscayne, United States; Tier I event Hard – $3,770,000 – 96S/48Q/32D; Singles – Doubles	(Slovenia) Katarina Srebotnik (Japan) Ai Sugiyama; 7–5, 4–6, [10–3]	(Zimbabwe) Cara Black (United States) Liezel Huber	(Russia) Svetlana Kuznetsova (Russia) Vera Zvonareva	(Belgium) Justine Henin (United States) Venus Williams (Russia) Elena Dementieva (Russia) Dinara Safina

=== April ===
Week	Tournament	Champions	Runners-up	Semifinalists	Quarterfinalists
7 Apr	Bausch & Lomb Championships; Amelia Island, United States; Tier II event Clay – $600,000 (green) – 56S/32Q/16D; Singles – Doubles	(Russia) Maria Sharapova; 7–6^{(9–7)}, 6–3	(Slovakia) Dominika Cibulková	(United States) Lindsay Davenport (France) Alizé Cornet	(Ukraine) Alona Bondarenko (Hungary) Ágnes Szávay (France) Virginie Razzano (France) Amélie Mauresmo
7 Apr	Bausch & Lomb Championships; Amelia Island, United States; Tier II event Clay – $600,000 (green) – 56S/32Q/16D; Singles – Doubles	(United States) Bethanie Mattek (Czech Republic) Vladimíra Uhlířová; 6–3, 6–1	(Belarus) Victoria Azarenka (Russia) Elena Vesnina	(United States) Lindsay Davenport (France) Alizé Cornet	(Ukraine) Alona Bondarenko (Hungary) Ágnes Szávay (France) Virginie Razzano (France) Amélie Mauresmo
14 Apr	Family Circle Cup; Charleston, United States; Tier I event Clay – $1,340,000 (green) – 56S/24Q/28D; Singles – Doubles	(United States) Serena Williams; 6–4, 3–6, 6–3	(Russia) Vera Zvonareva	(Russia) Elena Dementieva (France) Alizé Cornet	(Serbia) Jelena Janković (Switzerland) Patty Schnyder (Hungary) Ágnes Szávay (Russia) Maria Sharapova
14 Apr	Family Circle Cup; Charleston, United States; Tier I event Clay – $1,340,000 (green) – 56S/24Q/28D; Singles – Doubles	(Slovenia) Katarina Srebotnik (Japan) Ai Sugiyama; 6–2, 6–2	(Romania) Edina Gallovits (Belarus) Olga Govortsova	(Russia) Elena Dementieva (France) Alizé Cornet	(Serbia) Jelena Janković (Switzerland) Patty Schnyder (Hungary) Ágnes Szávay (Russia) Maria Sharapova
14 Apr	Estoril Open; Oeiras, Portugal; Tier IV event Clay (red) – $145,000 – 32S/32Q/16D; Singles – Doubles	(Russia) Maria Kirilenko; 6–4, 6–2	(Czech Republic) Iveta Benešová	(Estonia) Maret Ani (Czech Republic) Klára Zakopalová	(France) Camille Pin (Ukraine) Olga Savchuk (Italy) Karin Knapp (Italy) Tathiana Garbin
14 Apr	Estoril Open; Oeiras, Portugal; Tier IV event Clay (red) – $145,000 – 32S/32Q/16D; Singles – Doubles	(Russia) Maria Kirilenko (Italy) Flavia Pennetta; 6–4, 6–4	(Bosnia and Herzegovina) Mervana Jugić-Salkić (Turkey) İpek Şenoğlu	(Estonia) Maret Ani (Czech Republic) Klára Zakopalová	(France) Camille Pin (Ukraine) Olga Savchuk (Italy) Karin Knapp (Italy) Tathiana Garbin
21 Apr	Fed Cup: Semifinals; Moscow, Russia, clay (i); Beijing, China, hard (i)	Semifinals winners Russia 3–2; Spain 4–1	Semifinals losers United States; China		
28 April	Grand Prix SAR La Princesse Lalla Meryem; Fez, Morocco; Tier IV event Clay (red) – $145,000 – 32S/24Q/16D; Singles – Doubles	(Argentina) Gisela Dulko; 7–6^{(7–2)}, 7–6^{(7–5)}	(Spain) Anabel Medina Garrigues	(Hungary) Gréta Arn (France) Aravane Rezaï	(Ukraine) Olga Savchuk (Czech Republic) Petra Cetkovská (Russia) Alisa Kleybanova (Romania) Sorana Cîrstea
28 April	Grand Prix SAR La Princesse Lalla Meryem; Fez, Morocco; Tier IV event Clay (red) – $145,000 – 32S/24Q/16D; Singles – Doubles	(Romania) Sorana Cîrstea (Russia) Anastasia Pavlyuchenkova; 6–2, 6–2	(Russia) Alisa Kleybanova (Russia) Ekaterina Makarova	(Hungary) Gréta Arn (France) Aravane Rezaï	(Ukraine) Olga Savchuk (Czech Republic) Petra Cetkovská (Russia) Alisa Kleybanova (Romania) Sorana Cîrstea
28 April	ECM Prague Open; Prague, Czech Republic; Tier IV event Clay (red) – $145,000 – 32S/32Q/16D; Singles – Doubles	(Russia) Vera Zvonareva; 7–6^{(7–2)}, 6–2	(Belarus) Victoria Azarenka	(Slovenia) Katarina Srebotnik (Czech Republic) Klára Zakopalová	(Italy) Roberta Vinci (Czech Republic) Iveta Benešová (Czech Republic) Karolína Plíšková (Israel) Shahar Pe'er
28 April	ECM Prague Open; Prague, Czech Republic; Tier IV event Clay (red) – $145,000 – 32S/32Q/16D; Singles – Doubles	(Czech Republic) Andrea Hlaváčková (Czech Republic) Lucie Hradecká; 1–6, 6–3, [10–6]	(United States) Jill Craybas (Netherlands) Michaëlla Krajicek	(Slovenia) Katarina Srebotnik (Czech Republic) Klára Zakopalová	(Italy) Roberta Vinci (Czech Republic) Iveta Benešová (Czech Republic) Karolína Plíšková (Israel) Shahar Pe'er

=== May ===
Week	Tournament	Champions	Runners-up	Semifinalists	Quarterfinalists
5 May	Qatar Telecom German Open; Berlin, Germany; Tier I event Clay (red) – $1,340,000 – 56S/32Q/28D; Singles – Doubles	(Russia) Dinara Safina; 3–6, 6–2, 6–2	(Russia) Elena Dementieva	(Belarus) Victoria Azarenka (Serbia) Ana Ivanovic	(United States) Serena Williams (Ukraine) Alona Bondarenko (Serbia) Jelena Janković (Hungary) Ágnes Szávay
5 May	Qatar Telecom German Open; Berlin, Germany; Tier I event Clay (red) – $1,340,000 – 56S/32Q/28D; Singles – Doubles	(Zimbabwe) Cara Black (United States) Liezel Huber; 3–6, 6–2, [10–2]	(Spain) Nuria Llagostera Vives (Spain) María José Martínez Sánchez	(Belarus) Victoria Azarenka (Serbia) Ana Ivanovic	(United States) Serena Williams (Ukraine) Alona Bondarenko (Serbia) Jelena Janković (Hungary) Ágnes Szávay
12 May	Internazionali BNL d'Italia; Rome, Italy; Tier I event Clay (red) – $1,340,000 – 56S/48Q/28D; Singles – Doubles	(Serbia) Jelena Janković; 6–2, 6–2	(France) Alizé Cornet	(Russia) Anna Chakvetadze (Russia) Maria Sharapova	(Bulgaria) Tsvetana Pironkova (United States) Serena Williams (United States) Venus Williams (Switzerland) Patty Schnyder
12 May	Internazionali BNL d'Italia; Rome, Italy; Tier I event Clay (red) – $1,340,000 – 56S/48Q/28D; Singles – Doubles	(Chinese Taipei) Chan Yung-jan (Chinese Taipei) Chuang Chia-jung; 7–6^{(7–5)}, 6–3	(Czech Republic) Iveta Benešová (Slovakia) Janette Husárová	(Russia) Anna Chakvetadze (Russia) Maria Sharapova	(Bulgaria) Tsvetana Pironkova (United States) Serena Williams (United States) Venus Williams (Switzerland) Patty Schnyder
19 May	İstanbul Cup; Istanbul, Turkey; Tier III event Clay (red) – $200,000 – 30S/26Q/16D; Singles – Doubles	(Poland) Agnieszka Radwańska; 6–3, 6–2	(Russia) Elena Dementieva	(Uzbekistan) Akgul Amanmuradova (Bulgaria) Tsvetana Pironkova	(United States) Jill Craybas (Russia) Nadia Petrova (Belarus) Olga Govortsova (Slovenia) Andreja Klepač
19 May	İstanbul Cup; Istanbul, Turkey; Tier III event Clay (red) – $200,000 – 30S/26Q/16D; Singles – Doubles	(United States) Jill Craybas (Belarus) Olga Govortsova; 6–1, 6–2	(New Zealand) Marina Erakovic (Slovenia) Polona Hercog	(Uzbekistan) Akgul Amanmuradova (Bulgaria) Tsvetana Pironkova	(United States) Jill Craybas (Russia) Nadia Petrova (Belarus) Olga Govortsova (Slovenia) Andreja Klepač
19 May	Internationaux de Strasbourg; Strasbourg, France; Tier III event Clay (red) – $175,000 – 30S/32Q/16D; Singles – Doubles	(Spain) Anabel Medina Garrigues; 4–6, 7–6^{(7–4)}, 6–0	(Slovenia) Katarina Srebotnik	(Chinese Taipei) Chan Yung-jan (Switzerland) Timea Bacsinszky	(China) Peng Shuai (Japan) Ai Sugiyama (Italy) Flavia Pennetta (Ukraine) Alona Bondarenko
19 May	Internationaux de Strasbourg; Strasbourg, France; Tier III event Clay (red) – $175,000 – 30S/32Q/16D; Singles – Doubles	(Ukraine) Tatiana Perebiynis (China) Yan Zi; 6–4, 6–7^{(3–7)}, [10–6]	(Chinese Taipei) Chan Yung-jan (Chinese Taipei) Chuang Chia-jung	(Chinese Taipei) Chan Yung-jan (Switzerland) Timea Bacsinszky	(China) Peng Shuai (Japan) Ai Sugiyama (Italy) Flavia Pennetta (Ukraine) Alona Bondarenko
26 May; 2 Jun	French Open; Paris, France; Grand Slam; Clay (red) – $9,711,335 – 128S/96Q/64D/32X; Singles – Doubles – Mixed doubles	(Serbia) Ana Ivanovic; 6–4, 6–3	(Russia) Dinara Safina	(Russia) Svetlana Kuznetsova (Serbia) Jelena Janković	(Russia) Elena Dementieva (Estonia) Kaia Kanepi (Spain) Carla Suárez Navarro (Switzerland) Patty Schnyder
26 May; 2 Jun	French Open; Paris, France; Grand Slam; Clay (red) – $9,711,335 – 128S/96Q/64D/32X; Singles – Doubles – Mixed doubles	(Spain) Anabel Medina Garrigues (Spain) Virginia Ruano Pascual; 2–6, 7–5, 6–4	(Australia) Casey Dellacqua (Italy) Francesca Schiavone	(Russia) Svetlana Kuznetsova (Serbia) Jelena Janković	(Russia) Elena Dementieva (Estonia) Kaia Kanepi (Spain) Carla Suárez Navarro (Switzerland) Patty Schnyder
26 May; 2 Jun	French Open; Paris, France; Grand Slam; Clay (red) – $9,711,335 – 128S/96Q/64D/32X; Singles – Doubles – Mixed doubles	(United States) Bob Bryan (Belarus) Victoria Azarenka; 6–2, 7–6^{(7–4)}	(Serbia) Nenad Zimonjić (Slovenia) Katarina Srebotnik	(Russia) Svetlana Kuznetsova (Serbia) Jelena Janković	(Russia) Elena Dementieva (Estonia) Kaia Kanepi (Spain) Carla Suárez Navarro (Switzerland) Patty Schnyder

=== June ===
Week	Tournament	Champions	Runners-up	Semifinalists	Quarterfinalists
9 Jun	DFS Classic; Birmingham, Great Britain; Tier III event Grass – $200,000 – 56S/32Q/16D; Singles – Doubles	(Ukraine) Kateryna Bondarenko; 7–6^{(9–7)}, 3–6, 7–6^{(7–4)}	(Belgium) Yanina Wickmayer	(New Zealand) Marina Erakovic (United States) Bethanie Mattek	(Czech Republic) Petra Cetkovská (Ukraine) Alona Bondarenko (United Kingdom) Melanie South (Czech Republic) Nicole Vaidišová
9 Jun	DFS Classic; Birmingham, Great Britain; Tier III event Grass – $200,000 – 56S/32Q/16D; Singles – Doubles	(Zimbabwe) Cara Black (United States) Liezel Huber; 6–2, 6–1	(France) Séverine Brémond (Spain) Virginia Ruano Pascual	(New Zealand) Marina Erakovic (United States) Bethanie Mattek	(Czech Republic) Petra Cetkovská (Ukraine) Alona Bondarenko (United Kingdom) Melanie South (Czech Republic) Nicole Vaidišová
9 Jun	Barcelona Open; Barcelona, Spain; Tier IV event Clay (red) – $145,000 – 32S/28Q/16D; Singles – Doubles	(Russia) Maria Kirilenko; 6–0, 6–2	(Spain) María José Martínez Sánchez	(Spain) Nuria Llagostera Vives (France) Stéphanie Cohen-Aloro	(Italy) Sara Errani (Czech Republic) Lucie Šafářová (Russia) Ekaterina Ivanova (Romania) Edina Gallovits
9 Jun	Barcelona Open; Barcelona, Spain; Tier IV event Clay (red) – $145,000 – 32S/28Q/16D; Singles – Doubles	(Spain) Lourdes Domínguez Lino (Spain) Arantxa Parra Santonja; 4–6, 7–5, [10–4]	(Spain) Nuria Llagostera Vives (Spain) María José Martínez Sánchez	(Spain) Nuria Llagostera Vives (France) Stéphanie Cohen-Aloro	(Italy) Sara Errani (Czech Republic) Lucie Šafářová (Russia) Ekaterina Ivanova (Romania) Edina Gallovits
16 Jun	International Women's Open; Eastbourne, Great Britain; Tier II event Grass – $600,000 – 28S/32Q/16D; Singles – Doubles	(Poland) Agnieszka Radwańska; 6–4, 6–7^{(11–13)}, 6–4	(Russia) Nadia Petrova	(Australia) Samantha Stosur (France) Marion Bartoli	(Denmark) Caroline Wozniacki (Russia) Ekaterina Makarova (Argentina) Gisela Dulko (Russia) Alisa Kleybanova
16 Jun	International Women's Open; Eastbourne, Great Britain; Tier II event Grass – $600,000 – 28S/32Q/16D; Singles – Doubles	(Zimbabwe) Cara Black (United States) Liezel Huber; 2–6, 6–0, 10–8	(Czech Republic) Květa Peschke (Australia) Rennae Stubbs	(Australia) Samantha Stosur (France) Marion Bartoli	(Denmark) Caroline Wozniacki (Russia) Ekaterina Makarova (Argentina) Gisela Dulko (Russia) Alisa Kleybanova
16 Jun	Ordina Open 's-Hertogenbosch, Netherlands; Tier III event Grass – $175,000 – 30S/16Q/15D; Singles – Doubles	(Thailand) Tamarine Tanasugarn; 7–5, 6–3	(Russia) Dinara Safina	(Russia) Elena Dementieva (Ukraine) Alona Bondarenko	(Romania) Sorana Cîrstea (Slovenia) Katarina Srebotnik (Netherlands) Michaëlla Krajicek (Russia) Anna Chakvetadze
16 Jun	Ordina Open 's-Hertogenbosch, Netherlands; Tier III event Grass – $175,000 – 30S/16Q/15D; Singles – Doubles	(New Zealand) Marina Erakovic (Netherlands) Michaëlla Krajicek; 6–3, 6–2	(Latvia) Līga Dekmeijere (Germany) Angelique Kerber	(Russia) Elena Dementieva (Ukraine) Alona Bondarenko	(Romania) Sorana Cîrstea (Slovenia) Katarina Srebotnik (Netherlands) Michaëlla Krajicek (Russia) Anna Chakvetadze
23 Jun; 30 Jun	Wimbledon Championships; London, Great Britain; Grand Slam; Grass – $10,524,070 – 128S/96Q/64D/32X; Singles – Doubles – Mixed doubles	(United States) Venus Williams; 7–5, 6–4	(United States) Serena Williams	(China) Zheng Jie (Russia) Elena Dementieva	(Czech Republic) Nicole Vaidišová (Poland) Agnieszka Radwańska (Russia) Nadia Petrova (Thailand) Tamarine Tanasugarn
23 Jun; 30 Jun	Wimbledon Championships; London, Great Britain; Grand Slam; Grass – $10,524,070 – 128S/96Q/64D/32X; Singles – Doubles – Mixed doubles	(United States) Serena Williams (United States) Venus Williams; 6–2, 6–2	(United States) Lisa Raymond (Australia) Samantha Stosur	(China) Zheng Jie (Russia) Elena Dementieva	(Czech Republic) Nicole Vaidišová (Poland) Agnieszka Radwańska (Russia) Nadia Petrova (Thailand) Tamarine Tanasugarn
23 Jun; 30 Jun	Wimbledon Championships; London, Great Britain; Grand Slam; Grass – $10,524,070 – 128S/96Q/64D/32X; Singles – Doubles – Mixed doubles	(United States) Bob Bryan (Australia) Samantha Stosur; 7–5, 6–4	(United States) Mike Bryan (Slovenia) Katarina Srebotnik	(China) Zheng Jie (Russia) Elena Dementieva	(Czech Republic) Nicole Vaidišová (Poland) Agnieszka Radwańska (Russia) Nadia Petrova (Thailand) Tamarine Tanasugarn

=== July ===
Week	Tournament	Champions	Runners-up	Semifinalists	Quarterfinalists
7 Jul	Budapest Grand Prix; Budapest, Hungary; Tier III event Clay (red) – $175,000 – 30S/31Q/16D; Singles – Doubles	(France) Alizé Cornet; 7–6^{(7–5)}, 6–3	(Slovenia) Andreja Klepač	(Croatia) Karolina Šprem (Hungary) Gréta Arn	(Czech Republic) Petra Kvitová (Hungary) Katalin Marosi (Czech Republic) Klára Zakopalová (Germany) Anna-Lena Grönefeld
7 Jul	Budapest Grand Prix; Budapest, Hungary; Tier III event Clay (red) – $175,000 – 30S/31Q/16D; Singles – Doubles	(France) Alizé Cornet (Slovakia) Janette Husárová; 6–7^{(5–7)}, 6–1, [10–6]	(Germany) Vanessa Henke (Romania) Ioana Raluca Olaru	(Croatia) Karolina Šprem (Hungary) Gréta Arn	(Czech Republic) Petra Kvitová (Hungary) Katalin Marosi (Czech Republic) Klára Zakopalová (Germany) Anna-Lena Grönefeld
7 Jul	Internazionali Femminili di Palermo; Palermo, Italy; Tier IV event Clay (red) – $145,000 – 32S/32Q/16D; Singles – Doubles	(Italy) Sara Errani; 6–2, 6–3	(Ukraine) Mariya Koryttseva	(Italy) Flavia Pennetta (Spain) Anabel Medina Garrigues	(Georgia (country)) Margalita Chakhnashvili (Spain) Carla Suárez Navarro (Russia) Anastasia Pavlyuchenkova (Italy) Tathiana Garbin
7 Jul	Internazionali Femminili di Palermo; Palermo, Italy; Tier IV event Clay (red) – $145,000 – 32S/32Q/16D; Singles – Doubles	(Italy) Sara Errani (Spain) Nuria Llagostera Vives; 2–6, 7–6^{(7–1)}, [10–4]	(Russia) Alla Kudryavtseva (Russia) Anastasia Pavlyuchenkova	(Italy) Flavia Pennetta (Spain) Anabel Medina Garrigues	(Georgia (country)) Margalita Chakhnashvili (Spain) Carla Suárez Navarro (Russia) Anastasia Pavlyuchenkova (Italy) Tathiana Garbin
14 Jul	Bank of the West Classic; Stanford, United States; Tier II event Hard – $600,000 – 28S/32Q/16D; Singles – Doubles	(Canada) Aleksandra Wozniak; 7–5, 6–3	(France) Marion Bartoli	(United States) Serena Williams (Japan) Ai Sugiyama	(Switzerland) Patty Schnyder (Australia) Samantha Stosur (Slovakia) Dominika Cibulková (Russia) Anna Chakvetadze
14 Jul	Bank of the West Classic; Stanford, United States; Tier II event Hard – $600,000 – 28S/32Q/16D; Singles – Doubles	(Zimbabwe) Cara Black (United States) Liezel Huber; 6–4, 6–3	(Russia) Elena Vesnina (Russia) Vera Zvonareva	(United States) Serena Williams (Japan) Ai Sugiyama	(Switzerland) Patty Schnyder (Australia) Samantha Stosur (Slovakia) Dominika Cibulková (Russia) Anna Chakvetadze
14 Jul	Gastein Ladies; Bad Gastein, Austria; Tier III event Clay (red) – $175,000 – 32S/32Q/16D; Singles – Doubles	(France) Pauline Parmentier; 6–4, 6–4	(Czech Republic) Lucie Hradecká	(Hungary) Ágnes Szávay (Ukraine) Mariya Koryttseva	(Czech Republic) Iveta Benešová (Austria) Yvonne Meusburger (Czech Republic) Tereza Hladíková (Austria) Patricia Mayr
14 Jul	Gastein Ladies; Bad Gastein, Austria; Tier III event Clay (red) – $175,000 – 32S/32Q/16D; Singles – Doubles	(Czech Republic) Andrea Hlaváčková (Czech Republic) Lucie Hradecká; 6–3, 6–3	(Bulgaria) Sesil Karatantcheva (Serbia) Nataša Zorić	(Hungary) Ágnes Szávay (Ukraine) Mariya Koryttseva	(Czech Republic) Iveta Benešová (Austria) Yvonne Meusburger (Czech Republic) Tereza Hladíková (Austria) Patricia Mayr
21 Jul	East West Bank Classic; Carson, United States; Tier II event Hard – $600,000 – 56S/32Q/16D; Singles – Doubles	(Russia) Dinara Safina; 6–4, 6–2	(Italy) Flavia Pennetta	(Serbia) Jelena Janković (United States) Bethanie Mattek	(Russia) Nadia Petrova (Belarus) Victoria Azarenka (Austria) Sybille Bammer (China) Yuan Meng
21 Jul	East West Bank Classic; Carson, United States; Tier II event Hard – $600,000 – 56S/32Q/16D; Singles – Doubles	(Chinese Taipei) Chan Yung-jan (Chinese Taipei) Chuang Chia-jung; 2–6, 7–5, [10–4]	(Czech Republic) Eva Hrdinová (Czech Republic) Vladimíra Uhlířová	(Serbia) Jelena Janković (United States) Bethanie Mattek	(Russia) Nadia Petrova (Belarus) Victoria Azarenka (Austria) Sybille Bammer (China) Yuan Meng
21 Jul	Banka Koper Slovenia Open; Portorož, Slovenia; Tier IV event Hard – $145,000 – 32S/32Q/16D; Singles – Doubles	(Italy) Sara Errani; 6–3, 6–3	(Spain) Anabel Medina Garrigues	(Denmark) Caroline Wozniacki (Germany) Julia Görges	(Russia) Maria Kirilenko (Russia) Vera Dushevina (Russia) Elena Bovina (Croatia) Petra Martić
21 Jul	Banka Koper Slovenia Open; Portorož, Slovenia; Tier IV event Hard – $145,000 – 32S/32Q/16D; Singles – Doubles	(Spain) Anabel Medina Garrigues (Spain) Virginia Ruano Pascual; 6–4, 6–1	(Russia) Vera Dushevina (Russia) Ekaterina Makarova	(Denmark) Caroline Wozniacki (Germany) Julia Görges	(Russia) Maria Kirilenko (Russia) Vera Dushevina (Russia) Elena Bovina (Croatia) Petra Martić
28 Jul	Rogers Cup; Montreal, Canada; Tier I event Hard – $1,340,000 – 56S/48Q/28D; Singles – Doubles	(Russia) Dinara Safina; 6–2, 6–1	(Slovakia) Dominika Cibulková	(Belarus) Victoria Azarenka (France) Marion Bartoli	(Austria) Tamira Paszek (Russia) Svetlana Kuznetsova (Japan) Ai Sugiyama (Serbia) Jelena Janković
28 Jul	Rogers Cup; Montreal, Canada; Tier I event Hard – $1,340,000 – 56S/48Q/28D; Singles – Doubles	(Zimbabwe) Cara Black (United States) Liezel Huber; 6–1, 6–1	(Russia) Maria Kirilenko (Italy) Flavia Pennetta	(Belarus) Victoria Azarenka (France) Marion Bartoli	(Austria) Tamira Paszek (Russia) Svetlana Kuznetsova (Japan) Ai Sugiyama (Serbia) Jelena Janković
28 Jul	Nordea Nordic Light Open; Stockholm, Sweden; Tier IV event Hard – $145,000 – 32S/16Q/16D; Singles – Doubles	(Denmark) Caroline Wozniacki; 6–0, 6–2	(Russia) Vera Dushevina	(Poland) Agnieszka Radwańska (Slovenia) Katarina Srebotnik	(France) Camille Pin (Spain) Anabel Medina Garrigues (Spain) Virginia Ruano Pascual (Czech Republic) Iveta Benešová
28 Jul	Nordea Nordic Light Open; Stockholm, Sweden; Tier IV event Hard – $145,000 – 32S/16Q/16D; Singles – Doubles	(Czech Republic) Iveta Benešová (Czech Republic) Barbora Záhlavová-Strýcová; 7–5, 6–4	(Czech Republic) Petra Cetkovská (Czech Republic) Lucie Šafářová	(Poland) Agnieszka Radwańska (Slovenia) Katarina Srebotnik	(France) Camille Pin (Spain) Anabel Medina Garrigues (Spain) Virginia Ruano Pascual (Czech Republic) Iveta Benešová

=== August ===
Week	Tournament	Champions	Runners-up	Semifinalists		Quarterfinalists
11 Aug	Summer Olympic Games; Beijing, China; Hard – $0 – 64S/32D; Singles – Doubles	Gold	Silver	Bronze	Fourth place	(Austria) Sybille Bammer (United States) Serena Williams (United States) Venus Williams (Serbia) Jelena Janković
11 Aug	Summer Olympic Games; Beijing, China; Hard – $0 – 64S/32D; Singles – Doubles	(Russia) Elena Dementieva; 3–6, 7–5, 6–3	(Russia) Dinara Safina	(Russia) Vera Zvonareva; 6–0, 7–5	(China) Li Na	(Austria) Sybille Bammer (United States) Serena Williams (United States) Venus Williams (Serbia) Jelena Janković
11 Aug	Summer Olympic Games; Beijing, China; Hard – $0 – 64S/32D; Singles – Doubles	(United States) Serena Williams (United States) Venus Williams; 6–2, 6–0	(Spain) Anabel Medina Garrigues (Spain) Virginia Ruano Pascual	(China) Yan Zi (China) Zheng Jie; 6–2, 6–2	(Ukraine) Alona Bondarenko (Ukraine) Kateryna Bondarenko	(Austria) Sybille Bammer (United States) Serena Williams (United States) Venus Williams (Serbia) Jelena Janković
11 Aug	W&S Financial Group Women's Open; Mason, United States; Tier III event Hard – $175,000 – 32S/16Q/16D; Singles – Doubles	(Russia) Nadia Petrova; 6–2, 6–1	(France) Nathalie Dechy	(France) Amélie Mauresmo (Russia) Maria Kirilenko		(United States) Vania King (Canada) Aleksandra Wozniak (Germany) Sabine Lisicki (United States) Lilia Osterloh
11 Aug	W&S Financial Group Women's Open; Mason, United States; Tier III event Hard – $175,000 – 32S/16Q/16D; Singles – Doubles	(Russia) Maria Kirilenko (Russia) Nadia Petrova; 6–3, 4–6, [10–8]	(Chinese Taipei) Hsieh Su-wei (Kazakhstan) Yaroslava Shvedova	(France) Amélie Mauresmo (Russia) Maria Kirilenko		(United States) Vania King (Canada) Aleksandra Wozniak (Germany) Sabine Lisicki (United States) Lilia Osterloh
18 Aug	Pilot Pen Tennis; New Haven, United States; Tier II event Hard – $600,000 – 28S/32Q/16D; Singles – Doubles	(Denmark) Caroline Wozniacki; 3–6, 6–4, 6–1	(Russia) Anna Chakvetadze	(France) Amélie Mauresmo (France) Alizé Cornet		(Romania) Sorana Cîrstea (Hungary) Ágnes Szávay (France) Marion Bartoli (Slovakia) Daniela Hantuchová
18 Aug	Pilot Pen Tennis; New Haven, United States; Tier II event Hard – $600,000 – 28S/32Q/16D; Singles – Doubles	(Czech Republic) Květa Peschke (United States) Lisa Raymond; 4–6, 7–5, [10–7]	(Romania) Sorana Cîrstea (Romania) Monica Niculescu	(France) Amélie Mauresmo (France) Alizé Cornet		(Romania) Sorana Cîrstea (Hungary) Ágnes Szávay (France) Marion Bartoli (Slovakia) Daniela Hantuchová
18 Aug	Forest Hills Tennis Classic; Forest Hills, United States; Tier IV event Hard – $74,800 – 16S; Singles	(Czech Republic) Lucie Šafářová; 6–4, 6–2	(China) Peng Shuai	(Spain) Carla Suárez Navarro (Czech Republic) Iveta Benešová		(Russia) Vera Dushevina (Germany) Martina Müller (Russia) Ekaterina Makarova (United States) Jamea Jackson
25 Aug; 1 Sep	U.S. Open; New York City, United States; Grand Slam; Hard – $9,350,000 – 128S/96Q/64D/32X; Singles – Doubles – Mixed doubles	(United States) Serena Williams; 6–4, 7–5	(Serbia) Jelena Janković	(Russia) Dinara Safina (Russia) Elena Dementieva		(Italy) Flavia Pennetta (United States) Venus Williams (Switzerland) Patty Schnyder (Austria) Sybille Bammer
25 Aug; 1 Sep	U.S. Open; New York City, United States; Grand Slam; Hard – $9,350,000 – 128S/96Q/64D/32X; Singles – Doubles – Mixed doubles	(Zimbabwe) Cara Black (United States) Liezel Huber; 6–3, 7–6^{(8–6)}	(United States) Lisa Raymond (Australia) Samantha Stosur	(Russia) Dinara Safina (Russia) Elena Dementieva		(Italy) Flavia Pennetta (United States) Venus Williams (Switzerland) Patty Schnyder (Austria) Sybille Bammer
25 Aug; 1 Sep	U.S. Open; New York City, United States; Grand Slam; Hard – $9,350,000 – 128S/96Q/64D/32X; Singles – Doubles – Mixed doubles	(India) Leander Paes (Zimbabwe) Cara Black; 7–6^{(8–6)}, 6–4	(United Kingdom) Jamie Murray (United States) Liezel Huber	(Russia) Dinara Safina (Russia) Elena Dementieva		(Italy) Flavia Pennetta (United States) Venus Williams (Switzerland) Patty Schnyder (Austria) Sybille Bammer

=== September ===
Week	Tournament	Champions	Runners-up	Semifinalists	Quarterfinalists
8 Sep	Commonwealth Bank Tennis Classic; Bali, Indonesia; Tier III event Hard – $225,000 – 30S/8Q/16D; Singles – Doubles	(Switzerland) Patty Schnyder; 6–3, 6–0	(Austria) Tamira Paszek	(Slovakia) Daniela Hantuchová (Russia) Nadia Petrova	(Chinese Taipei) Chan Yung-jan (Italy) Flavia Pennetta (Italy) Francesca Schiavone (Poland) Marta Domachowska
8 Sep	Commonwealth Bank Tennis Classic; Bali, Indonesia; Tier III event Hard – $225,000 – 30S/8Q/16D; Singles – Doubles	(Chinese Taipei) Hsieh Su-wei (China) Peng Shuai; 6–7^{(4–7)}, 7–6^{(7–3)}, [10–7]	(Poland) Marta Domachowska (Russia) Nadia Petrova	(Slovakia) Daniela Hantuchová (Russia) Nadia Petrova	(Chinese Taipei) Chan Yung-jan (Italy) Flavia Pennetta (Italy) Francesca Schiavone (Poland) Marta Domachowska
8 Sep	Fed Cup: Final; Madrid, Spain, clay	Russia; 4–0	Spain		
15 Sep	Toray Pan Pacific Open; Tokyo, Japan; Tier I event Hard – $1,340,000 – 28S/32Q/16D; Singles – Doubles	(Russia) Dinara Safina; 6–1, 6–3	(Russia) Svetlana Kuznetsova	(Slovenia) Katarina Srebotnik (Russia) Nadia Petrova	(Serbia) Jelena Janković (Russia) Elena Dementieva (Estonia) Kaia Kanepi (Poland) Agnieszka Radwańska
15 Sep	Toray Pan Pacific Open; Tokyo, Japan; Tier I event Hard – $1,340,000 – 28S/32Q/16D; Singles – Doubles	(United States) Vania King (Russia) Nadia Petrova; 6–1, 6–4	(United States) Lisa Raymond (Australia) Samantha Stosur	(Slovenia) Katarina Srebotnik (Russia) Nadia Petrova	(Serbia) Jelena Janković (Russia) Elena Dementieva (Estonia) Kaia Kanepi (Poland) Agnieszka Radwańska
15 Sep	Guangzhou International Women's Open; Guangzhou, China; Tier III event Hard – $175,000 – 32S/21Q/16D; Singles – Doubles	(Russia) Vera Zvonareva; 6–7^{(4–7)}, 6–0, 6–2	(China) Peng Shuai	(China) Zheng Jie (France) Camille Pin	(Italy) Karin Knapp (Austria) Tamira Paszek (United States) Jill Craybas (Netherlands) Arantxa Rus
15 Sep	Guangzhou International Women's Open; Guangzhou, China; Tier III event Hard – $175,000 – 32S/21Q/16D; Singles – Doubles	(Ukraine) Mariya Koryttseva (Belarus) Tatiana Poutchek; 6–3, 4–6, [10–8]	(China) Sun Tiantian (China) Yan Zi	(China) Zheng Jie (France) Camille Pin	(Italy) Karin Knapp (Austria) Tamira Paszek (United States) Jill Craybas (Netherlands) Arantxa Rus
22 Sep	China Open; Beijing, China; Tier II event Hard – $600,000 – 28S/32Q/16D; Singles – Doubles	(Serbia) Jelena Janković; 6–3, 6–2	(Russia) Svetlana Kuznetsova	(Russia) Vera Zvonareva (China) Zheng Jie	(Slovakia) Daniela Hantuchová (Spain) Anabel Medina Garrigues (Slovakia) Dominika Cibulková (Serbia) Ana Ivanovic
22 Sep	China Open; Beijing, China; Tier II event Hard – $600,000 – 28S/32Q/16D; Singles – Doubles	(Spain) Anabel Medina Garrigues (Denmark) Caroline Wozniacki; 6–1, 6–3	(China) Han Xinyun (China) Xu Yifan	(Russia) Vera Zvonareva (China) Zheng Jie	(Slovakia) Daniela Hantuchová (Spain) Anabel Medina Garrigues (Slovakia) Dominika Cibulková (Serbia) Ana Ivanovic
22 Sep	Hansol Korea Open; Seoul, South Korea; Tier IV event Hard – $145,000 – 32S/32Q/16D; Singles – Doubles	(Russia) Maria Kirilenko; 2–6, 6–1, 6–4	(Australia) Samantha Stosur	(Estonia) Kaia Kanepi (United States) Jill Craybas	(France) Pauline Parmentier (Belgium) Yanina Wickmayer (Russia) Ekaterina Makarova (Israel) Shahar Pe'er
22 Sep	Hansol Korea Open; Seoul, South Korea; Tier IV event Hard – $145,000 – 32S/32Q/16D; Singles – Doubles	(Chinese Taipei) Chuang Chia-jung (Chinese Taipei) Hsieh Su-wei; 6–3, 6–0	(Russia) Vera Dushevina (Russia) Maria Kirilenko	(Estonia) Kaia Kanepi (United States) Jill Craybas	(France) Pauline Parmentier (Belgium) Yanina Wickmayer (Russia) Ekaterina Makarova (Israel) Shahar Pe'er
29 Sep	Porsche Tennis Grand Prix; Stuttgart, Germany; Tier II event Hard (i) – $650,000 – 28S/32Q/16D; Singles – Doubles	(Serbia) Jelena Janković; 6–4, 6–3	(Russia) Nadia Petrova	(Belarus) Victoria Azarenka (United States) Venus Williams	(China) Li Na (Russia) Elena Dementieva (Russia) Dinara Safina (Russia) Vera Zvonareva
29 Sep	Porsche Tennis Grand Prix; Stuttgart, Germany; Tier II event Hard (i) – $650,000 – 28S/32Q/16D; Singles – Doubles	(Germany) Anna-Lena Grönefeld (Switzerland) Patty Schnyder; 6–2, 6–4	(Czech Republic) Květa Peschke (Australia) Rennae Stubbs	(Belarus) Victoria Azarenka (United States) Venus Williams	(China) Li Na (Russia) Elena Dementieva (Russia) Dinara Safina (Russia) Vera Zvonareva
29 Sep	Japan Open Tennis Championships; Tokyo, Japan; Tier III event Hard – $175,000 – 32S/32Q/16D; Singles – Doubles	(Denmark) Caroline Wozniacki; 6–2, 3–6, 6–1	(Estonia) Kaia Kanepi	(Slovakia) Jarmila Gajdošová (Canada) Aleksandra Wozniak	(Thailand) Tamarine Tanasugarn (Czech Republic) Klára Zakopalová (Russia) Anastasia Pavlyuchenkova (Australia) Samantha Stosur
29 Sep	Japan Open Tennis Championships; Tokyo, Japan; Tier III event Hard – $175,000 – 32S/32Q/16D; Singles – Doubles	(United States) Jill Craybas (New Zealand) Marina Erakovic; 4–6, 7–5, [10–6]	(Japan) Ayumi Morita (Japan) Aiko Nakamura	(Slovakia) Jarmila Gajdošová (Canada) Aleksandra Wozniak	(Thailand) Tamarine Tanasugarn (Czech Republic) Klára Zakopalová (Russia) Anastasia Pavlyuchenkova (Australia) Samantha Stosur
29 Sep	Tashkent Open; Tashkent, Uzbekistan; Tier IV event Hard – $145,000 – 32S/16Q/16D; Singles – Doubles	(Romania) Sorana Cîrstea; 2–6, 6–4, 7–6^{(7–4)}	(Germany) Sabine Lisicki	(China) Peng Shuai (Slovakia) Magdaléna Rybáriková	(Romania) Monica Niculescu (Poland) Urszula Radwańska (Portugal) Michelle Larcher de Brito (Romania) Ioana Raluca Olaru
29 Sep	Tashkent Open; Tashkent, Uzbekistan; Tier IV event Hard – $145,000 – 32S/16Q/16D; Singles – Doubles	(Romania) Ioana Raluca Olaru (Ukraine) Olga Savchuk; 5–7, 7–5, [10–7]	(Russia) Nina Bratchikova (Germany) Kathrin Wörle	(China) Peng Shuai (Slovakia) Magdaléna Rybáriková	(Romania) Monica Niculescu (Poland) Urszula Radwańska (Portugal) Michelle Larcher de Brito (Romania) Ioana Raluca Olaru

=== October ===
Week	Tournament	Champions	Runners-up	Semifinalists	Quarterfinalists
6 Oct	Kremlin Cup; Moscow, Russia; Tier I event Hard (i) – $1,340,000 – 28S/32Q/16D; Singles – Doubles	(Serbia) Jelena Janković; 6–2, 6–4	(Russia) Vera Zvonareva	(Russia) Elena Dementieva (Russia) Dinara Safina	(Italy) Flavia Pennetta (Russia) Nadia Petrova (Slovakia) Dominika Cibulková (Russia) Svetlana Kuznetsova
6 Oct	Kremlin Cup; Moscow, Russia; Tier I event Hard (i) – $1,340,000 – 28S/32Q/16D; Singles – Doubles	(Russia) Nadia Petrova (Slovenia) Katarina Srebotnik; 6–4, 6–4	(Zimbabwe) Cara Black (United States) Liezel Huber	(Russia) Elena Dementieva (Russia) Dinara Safina	(Italy) Flavia Pennetta (Russia) Nadia Petrova (Slovakia) Dominika Cibulková (Russia) Svetlana Kuznetsova
13 Oct	Zurich Open; Zürich, Switzerland; Tier II event Hard (i) – $600,000 – 28S/32Q/16D; Singles – Doubles	(United States) Venus Williams; 7–6^{(7–1)}, 6–2	(Italy) Flavia Pennetta	(Spain) Anabel Medina Garrigues (Serbia) Ana Ivanovic	(Slovenia) Katarina Srebotnik (Belarus) Victoria Azarenka (Italy) Francesca Schiavone (Czech Republic) Petra Kvitová
13 Oct	Zurich Open; Zürich, Switzerland; Tier II event Hard (i) – $600,000 – 28S/32Q/16D; Singles – Doubles	(Zimbabwe) Cara Black (United States) Liezel Huber; 6–1, 7–6^{(7–3)}	(Germany) Anna-Lena Grönefeld (Switzerland) Patty Schnyder	(Spain) Anabel Medina Garrigues (Serbia) Ana Ivanovic	(Slovenia) Katarina Srebotnik (Belarus) Victoria Azarenka (Italy) Francesca Schiavone (Czech Republic) Petra Kvitová
20 Oct	Generali Ladies Linz; Linz, Austria; Tier II event Hard (i) – $600,000 – 28S/32Q/16D; Singles – Doubles	(Serbia) Ana Ivanovic; 6–2, 6–1	(Russia) Vera Zvonareva	(Poland) Agnieszka Radwańska (France) Marion Bartoli	(Italy) Flavia Pennetta (Russia) Nadia Petrova (Ukraine) Alona Bondarenko (France) Alizé Cornet
20 Oct	Generali Ladies Linz; Linz, Austria; Tier II event Hard (i) – $600,000 – 28S/32Q/16D; Singles – Doubles	(Slovenia) Katarina Srebotnik (Japan) Ai Sugiyama; 6–4, 7–5	(Zimbabwe) Cara Black (United States) Liezel Huber	(Poland) Agnieszka Radwańska (France) Marion Bartoli	(Italy) Flavia Pennetta (Russia) Nadia Petrova (Ukraine) Alona Bondarenko (France) Alizé Cornet
20 Oct	Fortis Championships Luxembourg; Kockelscheuer, Luxembourg; Tier III event Hard (i) – $225,000 – 32S/32Q/16D; Singles – Doubles	(Russia) Elena Dementieva; 2–6, 6–4, 7–6^{(7–4)}	(Denmark) Caroline Wozniacki	(Romania) Sorana Cîrstea (China) Li Na	(France) Amélie Mauresmo (Slovakia) Daniela Hantuchová (Spain) Anabel Medina Garrigues (Czech Republic) Iveta Benešová
20 Oct	Fortis Championships Luxembourg; Kockelscheuer, Luxembourg; Tier III event Hard (i) – $225,000 – 32S/32Q/16D; Singles – Doubles	(Romania) Sorana Cîrstea (New Zealand) Marina Erakovic; 2–6, 6–3, [10–8]	(Russia) Vera Dushevina (Ukraine) Mariya Koryttseva	(Romania) Sorana Cîrstea (China) Li Na	(France) Amélie Mauresmo (Slovakia) Daniela Hantuchová (Spain) Anabel Medina Garrigues (Czech Republic) Iveta Benešová
27 Oct	Bell Challenge; Quebec City, Canada; Tier III event Carpet (i) – $175,000 – 32S/32Q/16D; Singles – Doubles	(Russia) Nadia Petrova; 4–6, 6–4, 6–1	(United States) Bethanie Mattek	(United States) Angela Haynes (Canada) Aleksandra Wozniak	(Hungary) Melinda Czink (France) Nathalie Dechy (Kazakhstan) Galina Voskoboeva (United States) Melanie Oudin
27 Oct	Bell Challenge; Quebec City, Canada; Tier III event Carpet (i) – $175,000 – 32S/32Q/16D; Singles – Doubles	(Germany) Anna-Lena Grönefeld (United States) Vania King; 7–6^{(7–3)}, 6–4	(United States) Jill Craybas (Thailand) Tamarine Tanasugarn	(United States) Angela Haynes (Canada) Aleksandra Wozniak	(Hungary) Melinda Czink (France) Nathalie Dechy (Kazakhstan) Galina Voskoboeva (United States) Melanie Oudin

=== November ===
Week	Tournament	Champions	Runners-up	Semifinalists	Round robin
3 Nov	WTA Tour Championships; Doha, Qatar; Year-end Championship; Hard – $4,550,000 – 8S (round robin)/4D; Singles – Doubles	(United States) Venus Williams; 6–7^{(5–7)}, 6–0, 6–2	(Russia) Vera Zvonareva	(Russia) Elena Dementieva (Serbia) Jelena Janković	(Serbia) Ana Ivanovic (Russia) Svetlana Kuznetsova (Russia) Dinara Safina (United States) Serena Williams (Russia) Nadia Petrova (Poland) Agnieszka Radwańska
3 Nov	WTA Tour Championships; Doha, Qatar; Year-end Championship; Hard – $4,550,000 – 8S (round robin)/4D; Singles – Doubles	(Zimbabwe) Cara Black (United States) Liezel Huber; 6–1, 7–5	(Czech Republic) Květa Peschke (Australia) Rennae Stubbs	(Russia) Elena Dementieva (Serbia) Jelena Janković	(Serbia) Ana Ivanovic (Russia) Svetlana Kuznetsova (Russia) Dinara Safina (United States) Serena Williams (Russia) Nadia Petrova (Poland) Agnieszka Radwańska

=== Calendar changes ===
- Prize money continued to increase to a record of approximately $67 million.
- The J&S Cup, the Acura Classic, and the PTT Bangkok Open were all removed from the calendar.
- The Bangalore Open was promoted to a Tier II event, from its former Tier III status.
- The Zurich Open was demoted from Tier I to Tier II, and the Fortis Championships Luxembourg from Tier II to Tier III, with prize money also being reduced in both events to accommodate the change in status.
- One new event was created: the Cachantún Cup, held in Viña del Mar, Chile.
- The Toray Pan Pacific Open was moved from its normal February position in the calendar to September. It also changed from an indoor event to an outdoor event.
- Fed Cup quarterfinals and semifinals were held earlier, with the final still following the U.S. Open in September.
- The Qatar Total Open was elevated from Tier II status to Tier I, with prize money increasing to $2.5 million.
- Lastly, the WTA Tour Championships were relocated from their previous location of Madrid, Spain in 2006 and 2007, to Doha, Qatar for 2008. The prize money was also raised from $3 million to $4.5 million.

== Statistics ==
=== Titles information ===
List of players & singles titles won, last name alphabetically:

- (Serbia) Jelena Janković – Rome, Beijing, Stuttgart and Moscow (4)
- (Russia) Dinara Safina – Berlin, Los Angeles, Montréal and Tokyo (Tier I) (4)
- (United States) Serena Williams – Bangalore, Key Biscayne, Charleston, and US Open (4)
- (Russia) Elena Dementieva – Dubai, Beijing Olympics, and Luxembourg (3)
- (Serbia) Ana Ivanovic – Indian Wells, French Open, and Linz (3)
- (Russia) Maria Kirilenko – Estoril, Barcelona and Seoul (3)
- (Poland) Agnieszka Radwańska – Pattaya, Istanbul, and Eastbourne (3)
- (Russia) Maria Sharapova – Australian Open, Doha, and Amelia Island (3)
- (United States) Venus Williams – Wimbledon, Zürich, and WTA Tour Championships (3)
- (Denmark) Caroline Wozniacki – Stockholm, New Haven, and Tokyo (Tier III) (3)
- (United States) Lindsay Davenport – Auckland and Memphis (2)
- (Italy) Sara Errani – Palermo and Portorož (2)
- (Belgium) Justine Henin – Sydney and Antwerp (2)
- (Italy) Flavia Pennetta – Viña del Mar and Acapulco (2)
- (Russia) Nadia Petrova – Cincinnati and Quebec City (2)
- (Russia) Vera Zvonareva – Prague and Guangzhou (2)
- (Ukraine) Kateryna Bondarenko – Birmingham (1)
- (Russia) Anna Chakvetadze – Paris (1)
- (Romania) Sorana Cîrstea – Tashkent (1)
- (France) Alizé Cornet – Budapest (1)
- (Greece) Eleni Daniilidou – Hobart (1)
- (Argentina) Gisela Dulko – Fes (1)
- (Spain) Nuria Llagostera Vives – Bogotá (1)
- (Spain) Anabel Medina Garrigues – Strasbourg (1)
- (China) Li Na – Gold Coast (1)
- (France) Pauline Parmentier – Bad Gastein (1)
- (Czech Republic) Lucie Šafářová – Forest Hills (1)
- (Switzerland) Patty Schnyder – Bali (1)
- (Thailand) Tamarine Tanasugarn – 's-Hertogenbosch (1)
- (Canada) Aleksandra Wozniak – Stanford (1)

The following players won their first title:

- (Ukraine) Kateryna Bondarenko – Birmingham
- (France) Alizé Cornet – Budapest
- (Italy) Sara Errani – Palermo
- (Denmark) Caroline Wozniacki – Stockholm
- (Canada) Aleksandra Wozniak – Stanford
- (Romania) Sorana Cîrstea – Tashkent

Titles won by Nation

- Russia – 18 (Australian Open, Paris, Doha, Dubai, Amelia Island, Estoril, Prague, Berlin, Barcelona, Los Angeles, Montréal, Olympics, Cincinnati, Tokyo, Guangzhou, Seoul, Luxembourg, and Quebec City)
- United States – 9 (Auckland, Memphis, Bangalore, Key Biscayne, Charleston, Wimbledon, US Open, Zürich, and WTA Tour Championships)
- Serbia – 7 (Indian Wells, Rome, French Open, Beijing, Stuttgart, Moscow, and Linz)
- Italy – 4 (Viña del Mar, Acapulco, Palermo, and Portorož)
- Denmark – 3 (Stockholm, New Haven, and Tokyo (Tier III))
- Poland – 3 (Pattaya, Istanbul, and Eastbourne)
- Belgium – 2 (Sydney and Antwerp)
- Spain – 2 (Bogotá and Strasbourg)
- France – 2 (Budapest and Bad Gastein)
- Argentina – 1 (Fes)
- Canada – 1 (Stanford)
- China – 1 (Gold Coast)
- Czech Republic – 1 (Forest Hills)
- Greece – 1 (Hobart)
- Romania – 1 (Tashkent)
- Switzerland – 1 (Bali)
- Thailand – 1 ('s-Hertogenbosch)
- Ukraine – 1 (Birmingham)

=== Rankings ===
Singles Championship Race (3 November 2008)
Rk	Name	Nation	Points	Tour
1	Jelena Janković	SRB	4,786	21
2	Dinara Safina	RUS	3,823	20
3	Serena Williams	USA	3,681	12
4	Elena Dementieva	RUS	3,400	18
5	Ana Ivanovic	SRB	3,353	17
6	Vera Zvonareva	RUS	2,626	24
7	Svetlana Kuznetsova	RUS	2,623	18
8	Venus Williams	USA	2,522	13
9	Maria Sharapova	RUS	2,515	9
10	Agnieszka Radwańska	POL	2,256	23
11	Nadia Petrova	RUS	1,914	24
12	Flavia Pennetta	ITA	1,814	26
13	Caroline Wozniacki	DEN	1,756	23
14	Patty Schnyder	SUI	1,596	23
15	Alizé Cornet	FRA	1,499	23
16	Victoria Azarenka	BLR	1,497	20
17	Marion Bartoli	FRA	1,487	25
18	Dominika Cibulková	SVK	1,447	25
19	Katarina Srebotnik	SLO	1,410	24
20	Anna Chakvetadze	RUS	1,370	23

Singles Year–end Ranking
Rk	Name	Nation	Points	Change
1	Jelena Janković	SRB	4,710	▲2
2	Serena Williams	USA	3,866	▲5
3	Dinara Safina	RUS	3,817	▲12
4	Elena Dementieva	RUS	3,663	▲7
5	Ana Ivanovic	SRB	3,457	▼1
6	Venus Williams	USA	3,272	▲2
7	Vera Zvonareva	RUS	2,952	▲15
8	Svetlana Kuznetsova	RUS	2,726	▼6
9	Maria Sharapova	RUS	2,515	▼4
10	Agnieszka Radwańska	POL	2,286	▲16
11	Nadia Petrova	RUS	1,976	▲3
12	Caroline Wozniacki	DEN	1,713	▲48
13	Flavia Pennetta	ITA	1,670	▲26
14	Patty Schnyder	SUI	1,590	▲2
15	Victoria Azarenka	BLR	1,494	▲15
16	Alizé Cornet	FRA	1,492	▲39
17	Marion Bartoli	FRA	1,410	▼7
18	Anna Chakvetadze	RUS	1,363	▼12
19	Dominika Cibulková	SVK	1,337	▲32
20	Katarina Srebotnik	SLO	1,272	▲7

=== Number 1 ranking ===
Holder	Date gained	Date forfeited
Justine Henin (BEL)	Year-End 2007	19 May 2008
Maria Sharapova (RUS)	19 May 2008	9 June 2008
Ana Ivanovic (SRB)	9 June 2008	11 August 2008
Jelena Janković (SRB)	11 August 2008	18 August 2008
Ana Ivanovic (SRB)	18 August 2008	8 September 2008
Serena Williams (USA)	8 September 2008	6 October 2008
Jelena Janković (SRB)	6 October 2008	Year-End 2008

=== Points distribution ===
Category	W	F	SF	QF	R16	R32	R64	R128	Q	Q3	Q2	Q1
Grand Slam (S)	1000	700	450	250	140	90	60	2	31	25	15	2
Grand Slam (D)	1000	700	450	250	140	90	2	–	24	–	–	–
WTA Championships (S)	750	525	335	185	105	–	–	–	–	–	–	–
WTA Championships (D)	750	525	335	185	–	–	–	–	–	–	–	–
Tier I $3,000,000 (S)	500	350	225	125	70	45	30	1	20	–	10	1
Tier I $3,000,000 (D)	500	350	225	125	70	1	–	–	–	–	–	–
Tier I $2,000,000 (S)	465	325	210	115	65	40	25	1	15	–	10	1
Tier I $2,000,000 (D)	465	325	210	115	65	1	–	–	–	–	–	–
Tier I $1,340,000 (56S)	430	300	195	110	60	35	1	–	15	–	10	1
Tier I $1,340,000 (28S/32D)	430	300	195	110	60	1	–	–	20	15	10	1
Tier I $1,340,000 (16D)	430	300	195	110	1	–	–	–	–	–	–	–
Tier II $650,000 (28S)	300	215	140	75	40	1	–	–	15	10	5	1
Tier II $650,000 (16D)	300	215	140	75	1	–	–	–	–	–	–	–
Tier II $600,000 (56S)	275	190	125	70	35	20	1	–	10	–	5	1
Tier II $600,000 (28S)	275	190	125	70	35	1	–	–	15	10	5	1
Tier II $600,000 (16D)	275	190	125	70	1	–	–	–	–	–	–	–
Tier III $225,000 (32S)	165	115	75	40	20	1	–	–	5	–	3	1
Tier III $225,000 (16D)	165	115	75	40	1	–	–	–	–	–	–	–
Tier III $175,000 (56S)	140	100	65	35	20	10	1	–	4	–	3	1
Tier III $175,000 (30/32S, 32Q)	140	100	65	35	20	1	–	–	8	4	3	1
Tier III $175,000 (30/32S, 16Q)	140	100	65	35	20	1	–	–	4	–	3	1
Tier III $175,000 (16D)	140	100	65	35	1	–	–	–	–	–	–	–
Tier IV $145,000 (32S, 32Q)	115	80	50	30	15	1	–	–	7	3	2	1
Tier IV $145,000 (32S, 16Q)	115	80	50	30	15	1	–	–	3	–	2	1
Tier IV $145,000 (16S, 16D)	115	80	50	30	1	–	–	–	–	–	–	–

== Awards ==
The winners of the 2008 WTA Awards were announced on 25 March 2009, during a special ceremony at the Sony Ericsson Open.

- Player of the Year – Serena Williams
- Doubles Team of the Year – Cara Black & Liezel Huber
- Most Improved Player – Dinara Safina
- Comeback Player of the Year – Zheng Jie
- Newcomer of the Year – Caroline Wozniacki
- Humanitarian of the Year – Ana Ivanovic
- Karen Krantzcke Sportsmanship Award – Elena Dementieva
- Player Service Award – Liezel Huber
- Favorite Premier Tournament – Porsche Tennis Grand Prix (Stuttgart)
- Favorite International Tournament – Commonwealth Bank Tennis Classic (Bali)

== See also ==
- Tennis statistics
- Grand Slam (tennis)
- WTA Tour Championships
- List of WTA number 1 ranked players
- List of female tennis players
- WTA Awards
- 2008 WTA Tier I Series
- 2008 ATP Tour
