= 2008 Internationaux de Strasbourg =

- Date: 19–24 May
- Edition: 22nd
- Category: Tier III Series
- Draw: 30S / 16D
- Prize money: $175,000
- Surface: Clay
- Location: Strasbourg, France
- Venue: Centre Sportif de Hautepierre

Champions

Singles
- (Spain) Anabel Medina Garrigues

Doubles
- (Ukraine) Tatiana Perebiynis / (China) Zi Yan
- Internationaux de Strasbourg

The 2008 Internationaux de Strasbourg was a women's tennis tournament played on outdoor clay courts. It was the 22nd edition of the Internationaux de Strasbourg, and was part of the Tier III Series of the 2008 WTA Tour. The tournament took place at the Centre Sportif de Hautepierre in Strasbourg, France, from 19 May until 24 May 2008. Sixth-seeded Anabel Medina Garrigues won the singles title, her third at the event, after 2005 and 2007, and earned $28,000 first-prize money.

== Finals ==
=== Singles ===
(Spain) Anabel Medina Garrigues defeated (Slovenia) Katarina Srebotnik, 4–6, 7–6^{(7–4)}, 6–0

- It was Anabel Medina Garrigues' 1st singles title of the year, and her 8th overall.

=== Doubles ===
(Ukraine) Tatiana Perebiynis / (China) Zi Yan defeated (Chinese Taipei) Yung-jan Chan / (Chinese Taipei) Chia-jung Chuang, 6–4, 6–7^{(3–7)}, 10–6
