= 2007 Internationaux de Strasbourg – Doubles =

Doubles
- 2007 Internationaux de Strasbourg

Final
- Champions: (China) Yan Zi (China) Zheng Jie
- Runners-up: (Australia) Alicia Molik (China) Sun Tiantian
- Score: 6–3, 6–4

Events
Singles	Doubles
← 2006 ·	Internationaux de Strasbourg	· 2008 →

The doubles Tournament at the 2007 Internationaux de Strasbourg took place between 21 and 26 May on the outdoor clay courts of the Centre Sportif de Hautepierre in Strasbourg, France. Yan Zi and Zheng Jie won the title, defeating Alicia Molik and Sun Tiantian in the final.

== Seeds ==
1. (China) Yan Zi / (China) Zheng Jie (champions)
2. (Australia) Nicole Pratt / (Australia) Bryanne Stewart (first round)
3. (Ukraine) Yuliana Fedak / (Czech Republic) Vladimíra Uhlířová (quarterfinals)
4. (Australia) Alicia Molik / (China) Sun Tiantian (final)

== Draw ==
=== Key ===
- Q = Qualifier
- WC = Wild card
- LL = Lucky loser
- Alt = Alternate
- SE = Special exempt
- PR = Protected ranking
- ITF = ITF entry
- JE = Junior exempt
- w/o = Walkover
- r = Retired
- d = Defaulted
- SR = Special ranking

First round
(Japan) A Nakamura (Thailand) T Tanasugarn	6	6
(South Africa) L Marshall (Germany) J Tiszolczy	1	1
3	(Ukraine) Y Fedak (Czech Republic) V Uhlířová	6	6
(France) E Bacquet (Poland) N Kołat	0	3
(Russia) V Bardina (Russia) V Dushevina	2	6	[10]
(New Zealand) L Baker (Australia) N Kriz	6	4	[6]
(Latvia) L Dekmeijere (Uzbekistan) V Lepchenko	1	1
(Poland) K Jans (Poland) A Rosolska	6	6
(Germany) T Malek (Germany) C Schneider	5	2
4	(Australia) A Molik (China) T Sun	7	6
(France) AL Heitz (Germany) S Weidemann	1	4
(China) C Ji (China) S Sun	6	6
(Czech Republic) E Birnerová (Romania) A Ehritt-Vanc	6	7
2	(Australia) N Pratt (Australia) B Stewart	1	5

Quarterfinals
1	(China) Z Yan (China) J Zheng	6	6
(Japan) A Nakamura (Thailand) T Tanasugarn	0	2
3	(Ukraine) Y Fedak (Czech Republic) V Uhlířová	5	3
(Russia) V Bardina (Russia) V Dushevina	7	6
(Poland) K Jans (Poland) A Rosolska	0	3
4	(Australia) A Molik (China) T Sun	6	6
(China) C Ji (China) S Sun	7	6
(Czech Republic) E Birnerová (Romania) A Ehritt-Vanc	5	3

Semifinals
1	(China) Z Yan (China) J Zheng	6	6
(Russia) V Bardina (Russia) V Dushevina	3	1
4	(Australia) A Molik (China) T Sun	6	7
(China) C Ji (China) S Sun	0	6^{2}

Final
1	(China) Z Yan (China) J Zheng	6	6
4	(Australia) A Molik (China) T Sun	3	4
