= 2008 Dubai Tennis Championships – Men's singles =

Men's singles
- 2008 Dubai Tennis Championships

Final
- Champion: (United States) Andy Roddick
- Runner-up: (Spain) Feliciano López
- Score: 6–7^{(8–10)}, 6–4, 6–2

Details
- Draw: 32 (4Q / 3WC)
- Seeds: 8

Events
Singles	men	women
Doubles	men	women
- Dubai Tennis Championships

Roger Federer was the defending champion, but lost in the first round to Andy Murray.

Sixth-seeded Andy Roddick won in the final 6–7^{(8–10)}, 6–4, 6–2, against Feliciano López.

== Seeds ==
1. (Switzerland) Roger Federer (first round)
2. (Spain) Rafael Nadal (quarterfinals)
3. (Serbia) Novak Djokovic (semifinals)
4. (Spain) David Ferrer (quarterfinals)
5. (Russia) Nikolay Davydenko (semifinals)
6. (United States) Andy Roddick (champion)
7. (France) Richard Gasquet (second round)
8. (Czech Republic) Tomáš Berdych (second round)

== Draw ==
Key

- Q = Qualifier
- WC = Wild card
- LL = Lucky loser
- Alt = Alternate
- ITF = ITF entry
- PR = Protected ranking
- SR = Special ranking
- SE = Special exempt
- JE = Junior exempt
- JR = Junior Accelerator Programme entrant
- CO = College Accelerator Programme entrant
- NG = Next Gen Accelerator Program entrant
- w/o = Walkover
- r = Retired
- d = Defaulted

=== Finals ===
Semifinals
5	(Russia) Nikolay Davydenko	4	6	5
(Spain) Feliciano López	6	4	7
3	(Serbia) Novak Djokovic	6^{5}	3
6	(United States) Andy Roddick	7^{7}	6

Final
(Spain) Feliciano López	7^{10}	4	2
6	(United States) Andy Roddick	6^{8}	6	6

=== Top half ===
First round
1	(Switzerland) R Federer	7^{8}	3	4
(United Kingdom) A Murray	6^{6}	6	6
WC	(Germany) R Schüttler	6^{7}	6	1
(Spain) F Verdasco	7^{9}	4	6
(Switzerland) S Wawrinka	4	4
Q	(Czech Republic) J Hernych	6	6
WC	(Kuwait) M Ghareeb	4	0
5	(Russia) N Davydenko	6	6
4	(Spain) D Ferrer	6	6
(Germany) T Haas	3	0
(Finland) J Nieminen	1	2
(Belgium) O Rochus	6	6
(Serbia) J Tipsarević	3	6	4
(Spain) F López	6	4	6
(France) G Monfils	3	2
8	(Czech Republic) T Berdych	6	6

Second round
(United Kingdom) A Murray	6	3	7^{7}
(Spain) F Verdasco	3	6	6^{5}
Q	(Czech Republic) J Hernych	1	4
5	(Russia) N Davydenko	6	6
4	(Spain) D Ferrer	3	7	6
(Belgium) O Rochus	6	5	1
(Spain) F López	6	7
8	(Czech Republic) T Berdych	2	5

Quarterfinals
(United Kingdom) A Murray	5	4
5	(Russia) N Davydenko	7	6
4	(Spain) D Ferrer	4	3
(Spain) F López	6	6

Semifinals
5	(Russia) N Davydenko	4	6	5
(Spain) F López	6	4	7

=== Bottom half ===
First round
7	(France) R Gasquet	6	6
(Russia) D Tursunov	4	4
Q	(Czech Republic) J Minář	3	4
(Russia) I Andreev	6	6
(Russia) M Youzhny	3	4
(France) F Santoro	6	6
(Croatia) M Čilić	4	3
3	(Serbia) N Djokovic	6	6
6	(United States) A Roddick	6	6
(Spain) JC Ferrero	2	4
Q	(Australia) J Sirianni	4	4
(France) P-H Mathieu	6	6
WC	(United Arab Emirates) M Al Baloushi	1	1
Q	(Russia) M Ledovskikh	6	6
(Germany) P Kohlschreiber	6	1	4
2	(Spain) R Nadal	3	6	6

Second round
7	(France) R Gasquet	3	4
(Russia) I Andreev	6	6
(France) F Santoro	3	6^{3}
3	(Serbia) N Djokovic	6	7^{7}
6	(United States) A Roddick	6	6
(France) P-H Mathieu	3	4
Q	(Russia) M Ledovskikh	4	0
2	(Spain) R Nadal	6	6

Quarterfinals
(Russia) I Andreev	2	1
3	(Serbia) N Djokovic	6	6
6	(United States) A Roddick	7^{7}	6
2	(Spain) R Nadal	6^{5}	2

Semifinals
3	(Serbia) N Djokovic	6^{5}	3
6	(United States) A Roddick	7^{7}	6
