= 2008 Dubai Tennis Championships – Men's doubles =

Men's doubles
- 2008 Dubai Tennis Championships

Final
- Champions: (India) Mahesh Bhupathi (The Bahamas) Mark Knowles
- Runners-up: (Czech Republic) Martin Damm (Czech Republic) Pavel Vízner
- Score: 7–5, 7–6^{(9–7)}

Details
- Draw: 16
- Seeds: 4

Events
Singles	men	women
Doubles	men	women
← 2007 ·	Dubai Tennis Championships	· 2009 →

Fabrice Santoro and Nenad Zimonjić were the defending champions. They were both present but did not compete together.
Santoro partnered with Richard Gasquet, but lost in the quarterfinals to Simon Aspelin and Julian Knowle.
Zimonjic partnered with Daniel Nestor, but lost in the semifinals to Martin Damm and Pavel Vízner.

Mahesh Bhupathi and Mark Knowles won in the final 7–5, 7–6^{(9–7)}, against Martin Damm and Pavel Vízner.

== Seeds ==
1. (Canada) Daniel Nestor / (Serbia) Nenad Zimonjić (semifinals)
2. (Sweden) Simon Aspelin / (Austria) Julian Knowle (semifinals)
3. (Czech Republic) Martin Damm / (Czech Republic) Pavel Vízner (final)
4. (India) Mahesh Bhupathi / (The Bahamas) Mark Knowles (champions)

== Draw ==
=== Key ===
- Q = Qualifier
- WC = Wild card
- LL = Lucky loser
- Alt = Alternate
- SE = Special exempt
- PR = Protected ranking
- ITF = ITF entry
- JE = Junior exempt
- w/o = Walkover
- r = Retired
- d = Defaulted
- SR = Special ranking

=== Draw ===
First round
1	(Canada) D Nestor (Serbia) N Zimonjić	6	7^{8}
(Czech Republic) T Berdych (Finland) J Nieminen	4	6^{6}
(Russia) I Andreev (France) P-H Mathieu	5	4
WC	(India) R Bopanna (Pakistan) A-u-H Qureshi	7	6
3	(Czech Republic) M Damm (Czech Republic) P Vízner	6	6
(United Arab Emirates) HA Janahi (United Arab Emirates) M Al Baloushi	2	2
(Poland) M Fyrstenberg (Poland) M Matkowski	3	4
(Germany) P Kohlschreiber (Russia) M Youzhny	6	6
(South Africa) J Coetzee (South Africa) W Moodie	4	6^{5}
(Spain) F López (Spain) R Nadal	6	7^{7}
ALT	(Australia) J Kerr (Netherlands) R Wassen	4	3
4	(India) M Bhupathi (The Bahamas) M Knowles	6	6
(France) R Gasquet (France) F Santoro	6^{5}	6	[17]
(Spain) D Ferrer (Spain) F Verdasco	7^{7}	2	[15]
(Australia) P Hanley (India) L Paes	1	3
2	(Sweden) S Aspelin (Austria) J Knowle	6	6

Quarterfinals
1	(Canada) D Nestor (Serbia) N Zimonjić	2	7^{7}	[10]
WC	(India) R Bopanna (Pakistan) A-u-H Qureshi	6	6^{5}	[6]
3	(Czech Republic) M Damm (Czech Republic) P Vízner	6	7
(Germany) P Kohlschreiber (Russia) M Youzhny	4	5
(Spain) F López (Spain) R Nadal	1	1
4	(India) M Bhupathi (The Bahamas) M Knowles	6	6
(France) R Gasquet (France) F Santoro	3	6	[7]
2	(Sweden) S Aspelin (Austria) J Knowle	6	4	[10]

Semifinals
1	(Canada) D Nestor (Serbia) N Zimonjić	3	6^{6}
3	(Czech Republic) M Damm (Czech Republic) P Vízner	6	7^{8}
4	(India) M Bhupathi (The Bahamas) M Knowles	6	6
2	(Sweden) S Aspelin (Austria) J Knowle	2	0

Final
3	(Czech Republic) M Damm (Czech Republic) P Vízner	5	6^{7}
4	(India) M Bhupathi (The Bahamas) M Knowles	7	7^{9}
