= Lisa Marshall =

South African tennis player

- Country (sports): South Africa
- Born: 12 September 1987 (age 37)
- Plays: Right-handed
- Prize money: $12,559

Singles
- Career record: 8–58
- Highest ranking: No. 769 (24 Dec 2007)

Doubles
- Career record: 34–66
- Career titles: 1 ITF
- Highest ranking: No. 485 (25 Aug 2008)

Lisa Marshall (born 12 September 1987) is a South African former professional tennis player.

Marshall, a native of Cape Town, made her only WTA Tour main draw appearance at the 2007 Internationaux de Strasbourg, partnering Germany's Janine Tiszolczy in the doubles.

== ITF finals ==
Legend
$10,000 tournaments

=== Doubles: 5 (1–4) ===
Outcome	No.	Date	Tournament	Surface	Partner	Opponents	Score
Winner	1.	27 October 2007	Cape Town, South Africa	Hard	(South Africa) Lizaan du Plessis	(South Africa) Tegan Edwards (Spain) Goele Lemmens	6–2, 6–3
Runner–up	1.	17 August 2008	Iława, Poland	Clay	(Armenia) Anna Movsisyan	(Belarus) Ima Bohush (Slovakia) Romana Tabak	3–6, 2–6
Runner–up	2.	24 August 2008	Kędzierzyn-Koźle, Poland	Clay	(Ukraine) Ielyzaveta Rybakova	(Czech Republic) Simona Dobrá (Czech Republic) Iveta Gerlová	6–4, 0–6, [6–10]
Runner–up	3.	2 November 2008	Pretoria, South Africa	Hard	(South Africa) Surina De Beer	(South Africa) Christi Potgieter (South Africa) Bianca Swanepoel	3–6, 3–6
Runner–up	4.	16 August 2009	Tallinn, Estonia	Hard	(Australia) Jade Hopper	(Belarus) Anna Orlik (Latvia) Diāna Marcinkēviča	1–6, 6–0, [7–10]
