= 2008 Tashkent Open =

- Date: 29 September – 5 October
- Edition: 10th
- Category: Tier IV Series
- Draw: 32S / 16D
- Prize money: $145,000
- Surface: Hard / outdoor
- Location: Tashkent, Uzbekistan
- Venue: Tashkent Tennis Center

Champions

Singles
- (Romania) Sorana Cîrstea

Doubles
- (Romania) Ioana Raluca Olaru / (Ukraine) Olga Savchuk
- Tashkent Open

The 2008 Tashkent Open was a women's tennis tournament played on outdoor hard courts. It was the 10th edition of the Tashkent Open, and was part of the Tier IV Series of the 2008 WTA Tour. It took place at the Tashkent Tennis Center in Tashkent, Uzbekistan, from September 29 through October 5, 2008. Third-seeded Sorana Cîrstea won the singles title.

== Finals ==
=== Singles ===
(Romania) Sorana Cîrstea defeated (Germany) Sabine Lisicki, 2–6, 6–4, 7–6^{(7–4)}

- It was Sorana Cîrstea's 1st career title.

=== Doubles ===
(Romania) Ioana Raluca Olaru / (Ukraine) Olga Savchuk defeated (Russia) Nina Bratchikova / (Germany) Kathrin Wörle, 5–7, 7–5, [10–7]
