= Anna Orlik =

Belarusian tennis player

Anna Orlik Ганна Орлік
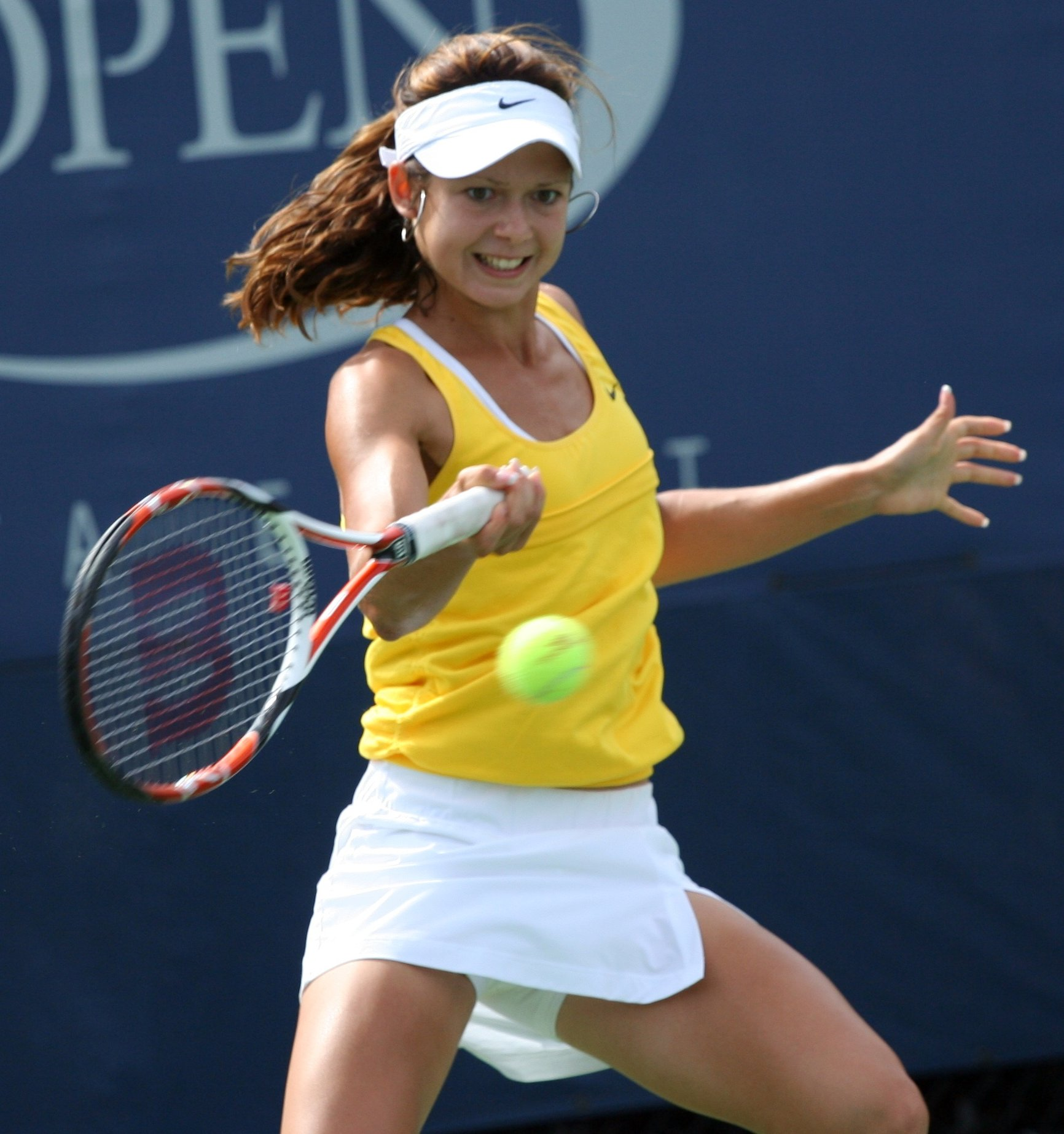
- Orlik at the 2009 Junior US Open
- Country (sports): Belarus
- Born: 5 March 1993 (age 32); Minsk, Belarus
- Height: 1.69 m (5 ft 7 in)
- Plays: Right-handed (two-handed backhand)
- Prize money: $16,320

Singles
- Career record: 38–24
- Career titles: 0
- Highest ranking: No. 585 (26 October 2009)

Doubles
- Career record: 34–12
- Career titles: 6 ITF
- Highest ranking: No. 387 (1 March 2010)

Anna Orlik (Belarusian: Ганна Орлік; Russian: Анна Орлик; born 5 March 1993) is a Belarusian former tennis player.

She has career-high WTA rankings of 585 in singles, achieved on 26 October 2009, and 387 in doubles, reached on 1 March 2010.

== Career summary ==
Orlik began playing on the ITF Circuit in 2007. She did not win a singles title, but she scored a doubles title in 2008 and went on to win three more in 2009. In 2009, she played her first WTA Tour event in Acapulco, falling to Ágnes Szávay in the opening round.

Before competing in the seniors, Orlik achieved a career high of No. 26 in the juniors ranking.

== ITF Circuit titles ==
=== Doubles: 6 ===
No.	Date	Tournament	Surface	Partnering	Opponents	Score
1.	Oct 2008	ITF St. Louis, United States	Hard	(Romania) Anda Perianu	(Japan) Tomoko Dokei (United States) Mami Inoue	6–2, 6–1
2.	Mar 2009	ITF Redding, United States	Hard	(Slovenia) Maša Zec Peškirič	(Russia) Alexandra Panova (Japan) Tomoko Yonemura	7–6^{(7–4)}, 6–4
3.	Aug 2009	ITF Savitaipale, Finland	Clay	(Latvia) Diāna Marcinkēviča	(Denmark) Malou Ejdesgaard (Israel) Ester Masuri	4–6, 6–2, [10–5]
4.	Aug 2009	ITF Tallinn, Estonia	Clay	(Latvia) Diāna Marcinkēviča	(Australia) Jade Hopper (South Africa) Lisa Marshall	6–1, 0–6, [10–7]
5.	Oct 2009	ITF Antalya-Belek, Turkey	Clay	(Czech Republic) Kateřina Vaňková	(Ukraine) Sophia Kovalets (Ukraine) Kateryna Kozlova	6–3, 6–0
6.	Oct 2010	ITF Antalya, Turkey	Clay	(Russia) Viktoria Kamenskaya	(Slovakia) Chantal Škamlová (Czech Republic) Monika Tůmová	7–6^{(9–7)}, 6–4
