= Jade Hopper =

Australian tennis player

- Country (sports): Australia
- Residence: Gold Coast, Australia
- Born: 13 July 1991 (age 33); Melbourne, Australia
- Height: 1.64 m (5 ft 4 1/2 in)
- Retired: 2011
- Plays: Right-handed (two-handed backhand)
- Prize money: $31,562

Singles
- Career record: 40–62
- Career titles: 0
- Highest ranking: No. 448 (31 January 2011)

Doubles
- Career record: 64–55
- Career titles: 4 ITF
- Highest ranking: No. 174 (14 February 2011)

Grand Slam doubles results
- Australian Open: 1R (2011)
Medal record
Commonwealth Youth Games
Gold medal – first place	2008 Pune	Doubles

Jade Hopper (born 13 July 1991) is a former professional Australian tennis player. On 31 January 2011, she reached her highest singles ranking by the WTA of No. 448. On 14 February 2011, she reached her best doubles ranking of world No. 174.

== Personal life ==
Jade was born to Gavin and Karen Hopper. She is a lawyer and resides in Melbourne, Australia. She holds a Master of Laws from the University of Melbourne, a Graduate Diploma of Legal Practise from ANU, a Bachelor of Laws from the University of Southern Queensland, a Bachelor of Arts (Communication) from Griffith University, a Graduate Certificate of Business from Deakin University and an MBA from Bilgi University. Jade was the subject of two ABC Australian Story episodes in 2002 and 2011.

== ITF Circuit finals ==
$100,000 tournaments
$75,000 tournaments
$50,000 tournaments
$25,000 tournaments
$10,000 tournaments

=== Singles (0–1) ===
Outcome	No.	Date	Tournament	Surface	Opponent	Score
Runner-up	1.	2 August 2010	Gaziantep, Turkey	Hard	(Turkey) Pemra Özgen	4–6, 4–6

=== Doubles (4–8) ===
Outcome	No.	Date	Tournament	Surface	Partner	Opponents	Score
Winner	1.	30 June 2008	Damascus, Syria	Hard	(Turkey) Eylül Benli	(India) Shivika Burman (Portugal) Magali de Lattre	6–1, 6–2
Runner-up	2.	5 October 2008	Mytilene, Greece	Hard	(Greece) Eirini Georgatou	(Russia) Renata Bakieva (Latvia) Diāna Marcinkēviča	1–6, 3–6
Winner	3.	11 July 2009	Gaziantep, Turkey	Hard	(Uzbekistan) Nigina Abduraimova	(Latvia) Diāna Marcinkēviča (Ukraine) Yuliana Umanets	6–3, 6–7^{(6–8)}, [13–11]
Runner-up	4.	10 August 2009	Tallinn, Estonia	Hard	(South Africa) Lisa Marshall	(Belarus) Anna Orlik (Latvia) Diāna Marcinkēviča	1–6, 6–0, [7–10]
Runner-up	5.	15 February 2008	Mildura, Australia	Grass	(Australia) Jarmila Gajdošová	(Australia) Casey Dellacqua (Australia) Jessica Moore	2–6, 6–7^{(3–7)}
Runner-up	6.	13 June 2010	Amarante, Portugal	Hard	(Portugal) Magali de Lattre	(Canada) Mélanie Gloria (Mexico) Daniela Múñoz Gallegos	4–6, 2–6
Winner	7.	13 July 2010	Cáceres, Spain	Hard	(France) Victoria Larrière	(Spain) Georgina García Pérez (Germany) Kim Grajdek	7–5, 6–4
Winner	8.	19 July 2010	A Coruña, Spain	Hard	(France) Victoria Larrière	(Spain) Leticia Costas Moreira (Spain) Inés Ferrer Suárez	7–6^{(8–6)}, 6–1
Runner-up	9.	2 August 2010	Gaziantep, Turkey	Hard	(Australia) Daniela Scivetti	(Oman) Fatma Al-Nabhani (Portugal) Magali de Lattre	3–6, 2–6
Runner-up	10.	15 November 2010	Wellington, New Zealand	Hard	(Australia) Jarmila Gajdošová	(Hungary) Tímea Babos (Australia) Tammi Patterson	3–6, 2–6
Runner-up	11.	22 November 2010	Traralgon, Australia	Hard	(Australia) Jarmila Gajdošová	(Hungary) Tímea Babos (United Kingdom) Melanie South	3–6, 2–6
Runner-up	12.	29 November 2010	Bendigo, Australia	Hard	(Australia) Jarmila Gajdošová	(Hungary) Tímea Babos (United Kingdom) Melanie South	3–6, 2–6
