= 2007 Internationaux de Strasbourg – Singles =

Singles
- 2007 Internationaux de Strasbourg

Final
- Champion: (Spain) Anabel Medina Garrigues
- Runner-up: (France) Amélie Mauresmo
- Score: 6–4, 4–6, 6–4

Details
- Seeds: 8

Events
Singles	Doubles
- Internationaux de Strasbourg

Nicole Vaidišová was the defending champion, but chose not to participate that year.

Anabel Medina Garrigues won the title, defeating Amélie Mauresmo in the final 6–4, 4–6, 6–4.

== Seeds ==
1. (France) Amélie Mauresmo (final)
2. (Serbia) Jelena Janković (semifinals)
3. (Slovakia) Daniela Hantuchová (withdrew due to a left leg strain)
4. (China) Li Na (quarterfinals)
5. (France) Marion Bartoli (semifinals)
6. (Spain) Anabel Medina Garrigues (champion)
7. (Germany) Martina Müller (withdrew due to a lower back strain)
8. (Japan) Akiko Morigami (first round)
9. (France) Émilie Loit (quarterfinals)
10. (Australia) Nicole Pratt (first round)

== Draw ==
Key

- Q = Qualifier
- WC = Wild card
- LL = Lucky loser
- Alt = Alternate
- ITF = ITF entry
- PR = Protected ranking
- SR = Special ranking
- SE = Special exempt
- JE = Junior exempt
- JR = Junior Accelerator Programme entrant
- CO = College Accelerator Programme entrant
- NG = Next Gen Accelerator Program entrant
- w/o = Walkover
- r = Retired
- d = Defaulted

=== Finals ===
Semifinals
1	(France) Amélie Mauresmo	6	6^{1}	6
5	(France) Marion Bartoli	3	7	3
6	(Spain) Anabel Medina Garrigues
2	(Serbia) Jelena Janković	w/o

Final
1	(France) Amélie Mauresmo	4	6	4
6	(Spain) Anabel Medina Garrigues	6	4	6

=== Top half ===
First round
(United States) V Lepchenko	3	6	6
(Russia) V Bardina	6	3	4
(Czech Republic) E Birnerová	0	2
Q	(United States) L Osterloh	6	6
WC	(China) T Sun	5	3
9	(France) É Loit	7	6
5	(France) M Bartoli	6	6
LL	(Australia) N Kriz	1	0
LL	(France) É Bacquet	0	1
(Germany) T Malek	6	6
Q	(China) Z Yan	4	1
(Russia) E Vesnina	6	6
(Belgium) C Maes	7	6
8	(Japan) A Morigami	5	4

Second round
1	(France) A Mauresmo	6	6
(United States) V Lepchenko	4	1
Q	(United States) L Osterloh	1	0
9	(France) É Loit	6	6
5	(France) M Bartoli	6	6
(Germany) T Malek	3	3
(Russia) E Vesnina	6	6
(Belgium) C Maes	1	4

Quarterfinals
1	(France) A Mauresmo	7	6
9	(France) É Loit	6^{3}	4
5	(France) M Bartoli	6	4	6
(Russia) E Vesnina	1	6	3

Semifinals
1	(France) A Mauresmo	6	6^{1}	6
5	(France) M Bartoli	3	7	3

=== Bottom half ===
First round
6	(Spain) A Medina Garrigues	6	6
WC	(Ukraine) Y Fedak	4	3
(Australia) A Molik	7	2	7
LL	(New Zealand) L Baker	6^{3}	6	6^{5}
(Russia) V Dushevina	6	6
WC	(Italy) K Knapp	4	4
(Slovenia) M Zec Peškirič	3	3
4	(China) N Li	6	6
10	(Australia) N Pratt	4	6^{3}
(Italy) ME Camerin	6	7
Q	(Canada) S Dubois	1	6	4
(Japan) A Nakamura	6	3	6
(Thailand) T Tanasugarn	6	6
Q	(China) S Sun	4	2

Second round
6	(Spain) A Medina Garrigues	6	6
(Australia) A Molik	2	4
(Russia) V Dushevina	2	3
4	(China) N Li	6	6
(Italy) ME Camerin	6	6
(Japan) A Nakamura	3	2
(Thailand) T Tanasugarn	3	5
2	(Serbia) J Janković	6	7

Quarterfinals
6	(Spain) A Medina Garrigues	2	6	7
4	(China) N Li	6	3	5
(Italy) ME Camerin	3	4
2	(Serbia) J Janković	6	6

Semifinals
6	(Spain) A Medina Garrigues	w/o
2	(Serbia) J Janković
