= 2008 Dubai Tennis Championships =

- Date: February 25 – March 8
- Edition: 16th (men) / 8th (women)
- Surface: Hard / Outdoor
- Location: Dubai, United Arab Emirates
- Venue: Aviation Club Tennis Centre

Champions

Men's singles
- (United States) Andy Roddick

Women's singles
- (Russia) Elena Dementieva

Men's doubles
- (India) Mahesh Bhupathi / (The Bahamas) Mark Knowles

Women's doubles
- (Zimbabwe) Cara Black / (United States) Liezel Huber
- Dubai Tennis Championships

The 2008 Barclays Dubai Tennis Championship was a tennis tournament played on outdoor hard courts. It was the 16th resp. 8th edition of the Dubai Tennis Championships, and it was part of the International Series Gold of the 2008 ATP Tour, resp. the Tier II Series of the 2008 WTA Tour. Both the men's and the women's events took place at the Dubai Tennis Stadium in Dubai, United Arab Emirates, with the women playing from February 25 through March 1, 2008, and the men from March 3 through March 8, 2008.

The men's field was led by World No. 1, Masters Cup champion, Australian Open semifinalist and four-time Dubai winner and defending champion Roger Federer, ATP No. 2, Chennai runner-up and Australian Open semifinalist Rafael Nadal, and new Australian Open champion Novak Djokovic. Other top seeds were Masters Cup runner-up David Ferrer, Moscow winner Nikolay Davydenko, Andy Roddick, Richard Gasquet and Tomáš Berdych.

The women's singles announced World No. 1, Tour Championships and Sydney winner, four-time Dubai titlist and defending champion Justine Henin, WTA No. 3 and Sydney finalist Svetlana Kuznetsova, and Australian Open runner-up Ana Ivanovic. Also competing in the field were Australian Open semifinalist Jelena Janković, Doha Tier I and Australian Open champion Maria Sharapova, Anna Chakvetadze, Marion Bartoli and Elena Dementieva.

== Finals ==
=== Men's singles ===
(United States) Andy Roddick def. (Spain) Feliciano López, 6–7^{(8–10)}, 6–4, 6–2

- It was Andy Roddick's 2nd title of the year, and his 25th overall.

=== Women's singles ===
(Russia) Elena Dementieva def. (Russia) Svetlana Kuznetsova, 4–6, 6–3, 6–2

- It was Elena Dementieva's 1st title of the year, and her 9th overall.

=== Men's doubles ===
(India) Mahesh Bhupathi / (The Bahamas) Mark Knowles def. (Czech Republic) Martin Damm / (Czech Republic) Pavel Vízner, 7–5, 7–6^{(9–7)}

=== Women's doubles ===
(Zimbabwe) Cara Black / (United States) Liezel Huber def. (China) Zi Yan / (China) Jie Zheng, 7–5, 6–2
