= 2008 Tashkent Open – Singles =

Singles
- 2008 Tashkent Open

Final
- Champion: (Romania) Sorana Cîrstea
- Runner-up: (Germany) Sabine Lisicki
- Score: 2–6, 6–4, 7–6^{(7–4)}

Details
- Draw: 32
- Seeds: 8

Events
Singles	Doubles
- Tashkent Open

Pauline Parmentier was the defending champion, but chose not to participate that year.

Sorana Cîrstea won her first WTA Tour singles title, defeating Sabine Lisicki in the final, 2–6, 6–4, 7–6^{(7–4)}.

== Seeds ==
1. (China) Peng Shuai (semifinals)
2. (Belarus) Olga Govortsova (first round)
3. (Romania) Sorana Cîrstea (champion)
4. (Germany) Sabine Lisicki (final)
5. (Slovakia) Magdaléna Rybáriková (semifinals, retired due to an illness)
6. (Romania) Monica Niculescu (quarterfinals)
7. (Uzbekistan) Akgul Amanmuradova (first round)
8. (Russia) Galina Voskoboeva (withdrew due to an illness)

== Draw ==
Key

- Q = Qualifier
- WC = Wild card
- LL = Lucky loser
- Alt = Alternate
- ITF = ITF entry
- PR = Protected ranking
- SR = Special ranking
- SE = Special exempt
- JE = Junior exempt
- JR = Junior Accelerator Programme entrant
- CO = College Accelerator Programme entrant
- NG = Next Gen Accelerator Program entrant
- w/o = Walkover
- r = Retired
- d = Defaulted

=== Finals ===
Semifinals
1	(China) Peng Shuai	7	3	4
4	(Germany) Sabine Lisicki	5	6	6
3	(Romania) Sorana Cîrstea	6	0
5	(Slovakia) Magdaléna Rybáriková	3	0^{r}

Final
4	(Germany) Sabine Lisicki	6	4	6^{4}
3	(Romania) Sorana Cîrstea	2	6	7

=== Top half ===
First round
1	(China) S Peng	6	6
LL	(Russia) A Rodionova	4	1
Q	(Netherlands) A Rus	3	6	6
WC	(Uzbekistan) V Ekshibarova	6	2	1
(Belarus) A Yakimova	1	0
(Kazakhstan) Y Shvedova	6	6
(Ukraine) O Savchuk	5	1^{r}
6	(Romania) M Niculescu	7	0
4	(Germany) S Lisicki	6	6
WC	(Uzbekistan) D Saidkhodjaeva	0	1
Q	(Russia) A Panova	6	6
WC	(Uzbekistan) A Ogorodova	4	0
(France) K Laisné	3	6	4
(Georgia (country)) S Shapatava	6	4	6
(Poland) U Radwańska	7	6
7	(Uzbekistan) A Amanmuradova	6^{5}	3

Second round
1	(China) S Peng	6	7
Q	(Netherlands) A Rus	1	5
(Kazakhstan) Y Shvedova	3	4^{r}
6	(Romania) M Niculescu	6	3
4	(Germany) S Lisicki	7	6
Q	(Russia) A Panova	5	1
(Georgia (country)) S Shapatava	5	2
(Poland) U Radwańska	7	6

Quarterfinals
1	(China) S Peng	6^{6}	6	6
6	(Romania) M Niculescu	7	2	4
4	(Germany) S Lisicki	3	7	7
(Poland) U Radwańska	6	5	6^{4}

Semifinals
1	(China) S Peng	7	3	4
4	(Germany) S Lisicki	5	6	6

=== Bottom half ===
First round
LL	(Uzbekistan) S Khayrova	1	1
(Belarus) T Poutchek	6	6
(Slovenia) A Klepač	0	7	2
(Portugal) M Larcher de Brito	6	6^{4}	6
(Russia) A Lapushchenkova	4	6	7
Q	(Russia) N Bratchikova	6	1	6^{3}
(Belarus) E Dzehalevich	6^{4}	5
3	(Romania) S Cîrstea	7	7
5	(Slovakia) M Rybáriková	6	6
(Germany) K Wörle	4	4
(Russia) V Manasieva	6	6
LL	(Uzbekistan) N Abduraimova	1	1
(Romania) IR Olaru	6	6
(United Kingdom) K O'Brien	2	1
Q	(Kyrgyzstan) K Palkina	7	4	7
2	(Belarus) O Govortsova	6^{7}	6	5

Second round
(Belarus) T Poutchek	4	1
(Portugal) M Larcher de Brito	6	6
(Russia) A Lapushchenkova	1	4
3	(Romania) S Cîrstea	6	6
5	(Slovakia) M Rybáriková	6	7
(Russia) V Manasieva	1	5
(Romania) IR Olaru	2	6	6
Q	(Kyrgyzstan) K Palkina	6	3	2

Quarterfinals
(Portugal) M Larcher de Brito	2	6^{5}
3	(Romania) S Cîrstea	6	7
5	(Slovakia) M Rybáriková	6	6
(Romania) IR Olaru	1	2

Semifinals
3	(Romania) S Cîrstea	6	0
5	(Slovakia) M Rybáriková	3	0^{r}
