= 2008 Internationaux de Strasbourg – Doubles =

Doubles
- 2008 Internationaux de Strasbourg

Final
- Champions: (Ukraine) Tatiana Perebiynis (China) Yan Zi
- Runners-up: (Chinese Taipei) Chan Yung-jan (Chinese Taipei) Chuang Chia-jung
- Score: 6–4, 6–7(3–7), 10–6

Events
| Singles | Doubles |
| ← 2007 · | Internationaux de Strasbourg | · 2009 → |

Yan Zi and Jie Zheng were the defending champions, but Zheng chose not to participate, and only Yan competed that year.
Yan partnered with Tatiana Perebiynis, and won in the final 6–4, 6–7^{(3–7)}, 10–6, against Yung-jan Chan and Chia-jung Chuang.

== Seeds ==
1. (Chinese Taipei) Chan Yung-jan / (Chinese Taipei) Chuang Chia-jung (final)
2. (Ukraine) Tatiana Perebiynis / (China) Yan Zi (champions)
3. (Slovakia) Janette Husárová / (Italy) Flavia Pennetta (quarterfinals, withdrew due to a left thigh muscle strain for Pennetta)
4. (Ukraine) Mariya Koryttseva / (Czech Republic) Vladimíra Uhlířová (quarterfinals)

== Draw ==
=== Key ===
- Q = Qualifier
- WC = Wild card
- LL = Lucky loser
- Alt = Alternate
- SE = Special exempt
- PR = Protected ranking
- ITF = ITF entry
- JE = Junior exempt
- w/o = Walkover
- r = Retired
- d = Defaulted
- SR = Special ranking

=== Draw ===
First round
1 | (Chinese Taipei) Y-j Chan (Chinese Taipei) C-j Chuang | 6 | 6
WC | (France) F Haring (China) Y Meng | 1 | 1
(Romania) E Gallovits (Czech Republic) G Navrátilová | 6 | 2 | [10]
(France) S Lefèvre (France) A Védy | 0 | 6 | [2]
3 | (Slovakia) J Husárová (Italy) F Pennetta | 6 | 4 | [10]
(France) S Foretz (Ukraine) O Savchuk | 1 | 6 | [8]
(Ukraine) Y Fedak (Japan) A Morita | 6 | 5 | [10]
(Romania) A Ehritt-Vanc (Thailand) T Tanasugarn | 1 | 7 | [6]
(Romania) M Buzărnescu (Ukraine) Y Savranska | 2 | 3
(Australia) C Dellacqua (South Africa) N Grandin | 6 | 6
(United Kingdom) S Borwell (Belgium) D Feys | 2 | 4
4 | (Ukraine) M Koryttseva (Czech Republic) V Uhlířová | 6 | 6
(Paraguay) R de los Ríos (Venezuela) M Sequera | 2 | 0
(Switzerland) T Bacsinszky (Poland) A Rosolska | 6 | 6
(China) C Ji (China) S Sun | 3 | 2
2 | (Ukraine) T Perebiynis (China) Z Yan | 6 | 6

Quarterfinals
1 | (Chinese Taipei) Y-j Chan (Chinese Taipei) C-j Chuang | 6 | 6
(Romania) E Gallovits (Czech Republic) G Navrátilová | 3 | 1
3 | (Slovakia) J Husárová (Italy) F Pennetta
(Ukraine) Y Fedak (Japan) A Morita | w/o
(Australia) C Dellacqua (South Africa) N Grandin | 4 | 6 | [11]
4 | (Ukraine) M Koryttseva (Czech Republic) V Uhlířová | 6 | 2 | [9]
(Switzerland) T Bacsinszky (Poland) A Rosolska | 6 | 3 | [4]
2 | (Ukraine) T Perebiynis (China) Z Yan | 4 | 6 | [10]

Semifinals
1 | (Chinese Taipei) Y-j Chan (Chinese Taipei) C-j Chuang | 6 | 6
(Ukraine) Y Fedak (Japan) A Morita | 2 | 1
(Australia) C Dellacqua (South Africa) N Grandin | 2 | 2
2 | (Ukraine) T Perebiynis (China) Z Yan | 6 | 6

Final
1 | (Chinese Taipei) Y-j Chan (Chinese Taipei) C-j Chuang | 4 | 7 | [6]
2 | (Ukraine) T Perebiynis (China) Z Yan | 6 | 6^{3} | [10]
