= 2008 Dubai Tennis Championships – Women's doubles =

Women's doubles
- 2008 Dubai Tennis Championships

Final
- Champions: (Zimbabwe) Cara Black (United States) Liezel Huber
- Runners-up: (China) Zi Yan (China) Jie Zheng
- Score: 7–5, 6–2

Events
Singles	men	women
Doubles	men	women
- Dubai Tennis Championships

Cara Black and Liezel Huber were the defending champions, and won in the final 7–5, 6–2, against Jie Zheng and Zi Yan.

== Seeds ==
1. (Zimbabwe) Cara Black / (United States) Liezel Huber (champions)
2. (Slovenia) Katarina Srebotnik / (Japan) Ai Sugiyama (semifinals)
3. (Czech Republic) Květa Peschke / (Australia) Rennae Stubbs (quarterfinals)
4. (Chinese Taipei) Yung-jan Chan / (Chinese Taipei) Chia-jung Chuang (semifinals)

== Draw ==
Key

- Q = Qualifier
- WC = Wild card
- LL = Lucky loser
- Alt = Alternate
- ITF = ITF entry
- PR = Protected ranking
- SR = Special ranking
- SE = Special exempt
- JE = Junior exempt
- JR = Junior Accelerator Programme entrant
- CO = College Accelerator Programme entrant
- NG = Next Gen Accelerator Program entrant
- w/o = Walkover
- r = Retired
- d = Defaulted

=== Draw ===
First round
1	(Zimbabwe) C Black (United States) L Huber	6	6
(China) S Peng (China) T Sun	3	3
WC	(Russia) S Kuznetsova (France) A Mauresmo	4	4
(India) S Mirza (Italy) F Schiavone	6	6
4	(Chinese Taipei) Y-j Chan (Chinese Taipei) C-j Chuang	6	6
(Belarus) T Poutchek (Russia) A Rodionova	3	3
(Czech Republic) V Uhlířová (Russia) G Voskoboeva	6	3	[11]
WC	(France) S Foretz (Tunisia) S Sfar	3	6	[9]
(China) Z Yan (China) J Zheng	6	4	[10]
(Italy) T Garbin (Czech Republic) G Navrátilová	1	6	[4]
(Russia) M Kirilenko (Hungary) Á Szávay	2	3
3	(Czech Republic) K Peschke (Australia) R Stubbs	6	6
(Slovakia) J Husárová (Poland) A Radwańska	4	2
ALT	(Russia) N Petrova (Russia) E Vesnina	6	6
(Spain) A Medina Garrigues (Spain) V Ruano Pascual	2	6	[6]
2	(Slovenia) K Srebotnik (Japan) A Sugiyama	6	4	[10]

Quarterfinals
1	(Zimbabwe) C Black (United States) L Huber	6	6^{4}	[12]
(India) S Mirza (Italy) F Schiavone	2	7	[10]
4	(Chinese Taipei) Y-j Chan (Chinese Taipei) C-j Chuang	6	6
(Czech Republic) V Uhlířová (Russia) G Voskoboeva	3	4
(China) Z Yan (China) J Zheng	4	6	[10]
3	(Czech Republic) K Peschke (Australia) R Stubbs	6	2	[7]
ALT	(Russia) N Petrova (Russia) E Vesnina	3	3
2	(Slovenia) K Srebotnik (Japan) A Sugiyama	6	6

Semifinals
1	(Zimbabwe) C Black (United States) L Huber	6	6
4	(Chinese Taipei) Y-j Chan (Chinese Taipei) C-j Chuang	4	4
(China) Z Yan (China) J Zheng	6	7
2	(Slovenia) K Srebotnik (Japan) A Sugiyama	3	6^{5}

Final
1	(Zimbabwe) C Black (United States) L Huber	7	6
(China) Z Yan (China) J Zheng	5	2
