= 2008 Internationaux de Strasbourg – Singles =

Singles
- 2008 Internationaux de Strasbourg

Final
- Champion: (Spain) Anabel Medina Garrigues
- Runner-up: (Slovenia) Katarina Srebotnik
- Score: 4–6, 7–6^{(7–4)}, 6–0

Details
- Draw: 32
- Seeds: 8

Events
Singles	Doubles
- Internationaux de Strasbourg

Sixth-seeded Anabel Medina Garrigues was the defending champion, and successfully defended her title, defeating Katarina Srebotnik in the final 4–6, 7–6^{(7–4)}, 6–0.

== Seeds ==
The top two seeds receive a bye into the second round.

1. (France) Marion Bartoli (second round, retired due to a right wrist injury)
2. (Ukraine) Alona Bondarenko (quarterfinals)
3. (France) Virginie Razzano (first round)
4. (Italy) Flavia Pennetta (quarterfinals, withdrew due to a left thigh muscle strain)
5. (Slovenia) Katarina Srebotnik (final)
6. (Spain) Anabel Medina Garrigues (champion)
7. (Japan) Ai Sugiyama (quarterfinals)
8. (China) Yan Zi (second round)

== Draw ==
Key

- Q = Qualifier
- WC = Wild card
- LL = Lucky loser
- Alt = Alternate
- ITF = ITF entry
- PR = Protected ranking
- SR = Special ranking
- SE = Special exempt
- JE = Junior exempt
- JR = Junior Accelerator Programme entrant
- CO = College Accelerator Programme entrant
- NG = Next Gen Accelerator Program entrant
- w/o = Walkover
- r = Retired
- d = Defaulted

=== Finals ===
Semifinals
5	(Slovenia) Katarina Srebotnik	6	6^{8}	6
(Chinese Taipei) Yung-jan Chan	1	7	4
6	(Spain) Anabel Medina Garrigues	6	6
(Switzerland) Timea Bacsinszky	3	3

Final
5	(Slovenia) Katarina Srebotnik	6	6^{4}	0
6	(Spain) Anabel Medina Garrigues	4	7	6

=== Top half ===
First round
(Romania) IR Olaru	2	6^{3}
(China) S Peng	6	7
Q	(Ukraine) T Perebiynis	6	6
(United States) A Harkleroad	2	1
Q	(Germany) S Lisicki	3	1
5	(Slovenia) K Srebotnik	6	6
3	(France) V Razzano	1	0
(Chinese Taipei) Y-j Chan	6	6
(Australia) C Dellacqua	7	6
(Italy) S Errani	5	3
(Ukraine) K Bondarenko	6	4	2
(Czech Republic) P Kvitová	3	6	6
(Ukraine) M Koryttseva	5	5
7	(Japan) A Sugiyama	7	7

Second round
1	(France) M Bartoli	1	0	r
(China) S Peng	6	1
Q	(Ukraine) T Perebiynis	6^{4}	0
5	(Slovenia) K Srebotnik	7	6
(Chinese Taipei) Y-j Chan	2	6	6
(Australia) C Dellacqua	6	1	1
(Czech Republic) P Kvitová	4	3
7	(Japan) A Sugiyama	6	6

Quarterfinals
(China) S Peng	4	5
5	(Slovenia) K Srebotnik	6	7
(Chinese Taipei) Y-j Chan	6	6
7	(Japan) A Sugiyama	4	2

Semifinals
5	(Slovenia) K Srebotnik	6	6^{8}	6
(Chinese Taipei) Y-j Chan	1	7	4

=== Bottom half ===
First round
6	(Spain) A Medina Garrigues	7	7
(Czech Republic) K Zakopalová	6^{3}	5
Q	(Paraguay) R de los Ríos	0	4
Q	(Croatia) A Vrljić	6	6
WC	(France) C Pin	6^{4}	2
(France) S Cohen-Aloro	7	6
WC	(France) N Dechy	6	2	3
4	(Italy) F Pennetta	4	6	6
8	(China) Z Yan	5
(Italy) M Santangelo	6	r
(Switzerland) T Bacsinszky	6	6
WC	(Australia) J Dokić	4	2
(Romania) E Gallovits	6	4
(Ukraine) J Vakulenko	1	1	r

Second round
6	(Spain) A Medina Garrigues	6	6
Q	(Croatia) A Vrljić	1	1
(France) S Cohen-Aloro	3	6	3
4	(Italy) F Pennetta	6	4	6
8	(China) Z Yan	2	7	4
(Switzerland) T Bacsinszky	6	5	6
(Romania) E Gallovits	4	4
2	(Ukraine) A Bondarenko	6	6

Quarterfinals
6	(Spain) A Medina Garrigues	w/o
4	(Italy) F Pennetta
(Switzerland) T Bacsinszky	7	6
2	(Ukraine) A Bondarenko	6^{6}	2

Semifinals
6	(Spain) A Medina Garrigues	6	6
(Switzerland) T Bacsinszky	3	3
