= 2008 Tashkent Open – Doubles =

Doubles
- 2008 Tashkent Open

Final
- Champions: (Romania) Ioana Raluca Olaru; (Ukraine) Olga Savchuk
- Runners-up: (Russia) Nina Bratchikova; (Germany) Kathrin Wörle
- Score: 5–7, 7–5, 10–7

Details
- Draw: 16
- Seeds: 4

Events
Singles	Doubles
← 2007 ·	Tashkent Open	· 2009 →

Ekaterina Dzehalevich and Anastasiya Yakimova were the defending champions. They are both present but do not compete together.
Dzehalevich partnered with Yaroslava Shvedova, but were forced to withdraw before their quarterfinals match against Alexandra Panova and Magdaléna Rybáriková due to an illness for Shvedova.
Yakimova partnered with Vesna Manasieva, but lost in the first round to Ekaterina Dzehalevich and Yaroslava Shvedova.

Ioana Raluca Olaru and Olga Savchuk won in the final 5–7, 7–5, 10–7, against Nina Bratchikova and Kathrin Wörle.

== Seeds ==
1. (Belarus) Ekaterina Dzehalevich / (Kazakhstan) Yaroslava Shvedova (quarterfinals, withdrew due to an illness for Shvedova)
2. (Uzbekistan) Akgul Amanmuradova / (Belarus) Olga Govortsova (first round)
3. (Belarus) Tatiana Poutchek / (Russia) Arina Rodionova (quarterfinals)
4. (Russia) Anna Lapushchenkova / (Romania) Monica Niculescu (quarterfinals, withdrew due to an illness for Lapushchenkova)

== Draw ==
=== Key ===
- Q = Qualifier
- WC = Wild card
- LL = Lucky loser
- Alt = Alternate
- SE = Special exempt
- PR = Protected ranking
- ITF = ITF entry
- JE = Junior exempt
- w/o = Walkover
- r = Retired
- d = Defaulted
- SR = Special ranking

=== Draw ===
First round

Quarterfinals

Semifinals

Final

1
- (Belarus) E Dzehalevich
- (Kazakhstan) Y Shvedova
4
6
[10]

- (Russia) V Manasieva
- (Belarus) A Yakimova
6
3
[5]

1
- (Belarus) E Dzehalevich
- (Kazakhstan) Y Shvedova

- (Uzbekistan) V Ekshibarova
- (Uzbekistan) D Narzykulova
2
1

- (Russia) A Panova
- (Slovakia) M Rybáriková
w/o

- (Russia) A Panova
- (Slovakia) M Rybáriková
6
6

- (Russia) A Panova
- (Slovakia) M Rybáriková
2
2

4
- (Russia) A Lapushchenkova
- (Romania) M Niculescu
6
6

- (Romania) IR Olaru
- (Ukraine) O Savchuk
6
6

- (France) K Laisné
- (United Kingdom) O'Brien
1
2

4
- (Russia) A Lapushchenkova
- (Romania) M Niculescu

- (Uzbekistan) A Ogorodova
- (Uzbekistan) D Saidkhodjaeva
2
3

- (Romania) IR Olaru
- (Ukraine) O Savchuk
w/o

- (Romania) IR Olaru
- (Ukraine) O Savchuk
6
6

- (Romania) IR Olaru
- (Ukraine) O Savchuk
5
7
[10]

- (Russia) N Bratchikova
- (Germany) K Wörle
6
6

- (Russia) N Bratchikova
- (Germany) K Wörle
7
5
[7]

- (Kyrgyzstan) K Palkina
- (Georgia (country)) S Shapatava
3
2

- (Russia) N Bratchikova
- (Germany) K Wörle
6
3
[10]

- (Uzbekistan) D Rakhimova
- (Uzbekistan) N Rakhmonova
0
1

3
- (Belarus) T Poutchek
- (Russia) A Rodionova
2
6
[8]

3
- (Belarus) T Poutchek
- (Russia) A Rodionova
6
6

- (Russia) N Bratchikova
- (Germany) K Wörle
6
7

- (Uzbekistan) N Abduraimova
- (Uzbekistan) S Hatamova
6
6

- (Slovenia) A Klepač
- (Poland) U Radwańska
4
6^{5}

- (Uzbekistan) N Burikhodjayeva
- (Uzbekistan) S Khayrova
0
2

- (Uzbekistan) N Abduraimova
- (Uzbekistan) S Hatamova
2
2

- (Slovenia) A Klepač
- (Poland) U Radwańska
6
6

- (Slovenia) A Klepač
- (Poland) U Radwańska
6
6

2
- (Uzbekistan) A Amanmuradova
- (Belarus) O Govortsova
1
1
