= 2008 Dubai Tennis Championships – Women's singles =

Women's singles
- 2008 Dubai Tennis Championships

Final
- Champion: (Russia) Elena Dementieva
- Runner-up: (Russia) Svetlana Kuznetsova
- Score: 4–6, 6–3, 6–2

Details
- Draw: 28
- Seeds: 8

Events
Singles	men	women
Doubles	men	women
- Dubai Tennis Championships

Justine Henin was the defending champion, but lost in the quarterfinals to Francesca Schiavone.

Elena Dementieva won in the final 4–6, 6–3, 6–2, against Svetlana Kuznetsova.

== Seeds ==
The top four seeds receive a bye into the second round.

1. (Belgium) Justine Henin (quarterfinals)
2. (Russia) Svetlana Kuznetsova (final)
3. (Serbia) Ana Ivanovic (quarterfinals)
4. (Serbia) Jelena Janković (semifinals)
5. (Russia) Maria Sharapova (withdrew due to viral illness)
6. (Russia) Anna Chakvetadze (quarterfinals, retired due to a left thigh injury)
7. (France) Marion Bartoli (first round)
8. (Russia) Elena Dementieva (champion)

== Draw ==
Key

- Q = Qualifier
- WC = Wild card
- LL = Lucky loser
- Alt = Alternate
- ITF = ITF entry
- PR = Protected ranking
- SR = Special ranking
- SE = Special exempt
- JE = Junior exempt
- JR = Junior Accelerator Programme entrant
- CO = College Accelerator Programme entrant
- NG = Next Gen Accelerator Program entrant
- w/o = Walkover
- r = Retired
- d = Defaulted

=== Finals ===
Semifinals
(Italy) Francesca Schiavone	7	5	2
8	(Russia) Elena Dementieva	5	7	6
4	(Serbia) Jelena Janković	7	4	3
2	(Russia) Svetlana Kuznetsova	5	6	6

Final
8	(Russia) Elena Dementieva	4	6	6
2	(Russia) Svetlana Kuznetsova	6	3	2

=== Top half ===
First round
(Russia) N Petrova	4	4
Q	(Slovenia) K Srebotnik	6	6
(Austria) S Bammer	7	6
Q	(Russia) E Makarova	6^{6}	3
(Italy) F Schiavone	6	6^{5}	6
7	(France) M Bartoli	1	7	1
Q	(Japan) A Nakamura	3	0
(Czech Republic) N Vaidišová	6	6
(Russia) M Kirilenko	6	3	2
(Ukraine) A Bondarenko	3	6	6
(Switzerland) P Schnyder	5	0
8	(Russia) E Dementieva	7	6

Second round
1	(Belgium) J Henin	7	6^{6}	6
Q	(Slovenia) K Srebotnik	5	7	3
(Austria) S Bammer	3	2
(Italy) F Schiavone	6	6
3	(Serbia) A Ivanovic	6	6
(Czech Republic) N Vaidišová	4	0
(Ukraine) A Bondarenko	2	1
8	(Russia) E Dementieva	6	6

Quarterfinals
1	(Belgium) J Henin	6^{3}	6^{4}
(Italy) F Schiavone	7	7
3	(Serbia) A Ivanovic	7	3	3
8	(Russia) E Dementieva	5	6	6

Semifinals
(Italy) F Schiavone	7	5	2
8	(Russia) E Dementieva	5	7	6

=== Bottom half ===
First round
6	(Russia) A Chakvetadze	6	2	6
Q	(Poland) A Radwańska	2	6	4
WC	(Tunisia) S Sfar	1	3
(Russia) D Safina	6	6
WC	(India) S Mirza	7	6
Q	(Russia) V Dushevina	6^{5}	2
LL	(Japan) A Morigami	6	6
(Hungary) A Szávay	1	4
(France) A Mauresmo	7	6
Q	(Spain) A Medina Garrigues	6^{7}	2
(Czech Republic) L Šafářová	1	6	6
LL	(Japan) A Sugiyama	6	3	2

Second round
6	(Russia) A Chakvetadze	6^{3}	6	6
(Russia) D Safina	7	4	3
WC	(India) S Mirza	6	3	4
4	(Serbia) J Janković	4	6	6
LL	(Japan) A Morigami	6	1	4
(France) A Mauresmo	4	6	6
(Czech Republic) L Šafářová	1	2
2	(Russia) S Kuznetsova	6	6

Quarterfinals
6	(Russia) A Chakvetadze	1	0	r
4	(Serbia) J Janković	6	0
(France) A Mauresmo	1	6^{4}
2	(Russia) S Kuznetsova	6	7

Semifinals
4	(Serbia) J Janković	7	4	3
2	(Russia) S Kuznetsova	5	6	6
