= 2007 Internationaux de Strasbourg =

- Date: 21–26 May
- Edition: 21st
- Category: Tier III
- Draw: 30S / 15D
- Prize money: $175,000
- Surface: Clay / outdoor
- Location: Strasbourg, France
- Venue: Centre Sportif de Hautepierre

Champions

Singles
- (Spain) Anabel Medina Garrigues

Doubles
- (China) Yan Zi / (China) Zheng Jie
- Internationaux de Strasbourg

The 2007 Internationaux de Strasbourg was a women's tennis tournament played on outdoor clay courts. It was the 21st edition of the Internationaux de Strasbourg, and was part of the Tier III Series of the 2007 WTA Tour. The tournament took place at the Centre Sportif de Hautepierre in Strasbourg, France, from 21 May until 26 May 2007. Sixth-seeded Anabel Medina Garrigues won the singles title and earned $25,865 first-prize money.

== Finals ==
=== Singles ===
(Spain) Anabel Medina Garrigues defeated (France) Amélie Mauresmo, 6–4, 4–6, 6–4

=== Doubles ===
(China) Yan Zi / (China) Zheng Jie defeated (Australia) Alicia Molik / (China) Sun Tiantian, 6–3, 6–4
