= 2008 WTA Tier I Series =

Women's professional tennis tour

Details
- Duration: February 18 – October 12
- Edition: 19th
- Tournaments: 9

Achievements (singles)
- Most titles: (Russia) Dinara Safina (3)
- Most finals: (Serbia) Jelena Jankovic (Russia) Dinara Safina (Russia) Vera Zvonareva (3)

The WTA Tier I events are part of the elite tour for professional women's tennis organised by the WTA called the WTA Tour.

== Tournaments ==
Tournament	Country	Location	Surface	Date	Prize money
Qatar Total Open	Qatar	Doha	Hard	Feb 18 – 24	$2,500,000
Pacific Life Open	United States	Indian Wells	Hard	Mar 10 – 23	$2,100,000
Sony Ericsson Open	United States	Key Biscayne	Hard	Mar 24 – Apr 6	$3,770,000
Family Circle Cup	United States	Charleston	Clay (green)	Apr 14 – 20	$1,340,000
Qatar Telecom German Open	Germany	Berlin	Clay (red)	May 5 – 11	$1,340,000
Internazionali BNL d'Italia	Italy	Rome	Clay (red)	May 12 – 18	$1,340,000
Rogers Cup	Canada	Montreal	Hard	Jul 28 – Aug 3	$1,340,000
Toray Pan Pacific Open	Japan	Tokyo	Hard	Sep 15 – 21	$1,340,000
Kremlin Cup	Russia	Moscow	Hard (i)	Oct 6 – 12	$1,340,000

== Results ==
* First-time champion

Tournament	Singles champions	Runners-up	Score	Doubles champions	Runners-up	Score
Doha Singles – Doubles	(Russia) Maria Sharapova	(Russia) Vera Zvonareva	6–1, 2–6, 6–0	(Czech Republic) Květa Peschke (Australia) Rennae Stubbs	(Zimbabwe) Cara Black (United States) Liezel Huber	6–1, 5–7, [10–7]
Indian Wells Singles – Doubles	(Serbia) Ana Ivanovic	(Russia) Svetlana Kuznetsova	6–4, 6–3	(Russia) Dinara Safina* (Russia) Elena Vesnina*	(China) Yan Zi (China) Zheng Jie	6–1, 1–6, [10–8]
Miami Singles – Doubles	(United States) Serena Williams	(Serbia) Jelena Janković	6–1, 5–7, 6–3	(Slovenia) Katarina Srebotnik (Japan) Ai Sugiyama	(Zimbabwe) Cara Black (United States) Liezel Huber	7–5, 4–6, [10–3]
Charleston Singles – Doubles	(United States) Serena Williams (2)	(Russia) Vera Zvonareva	6–4, 3–6, 6–3	(Slovenia) Katarina Srebotnik (2) (Japan) Ai Sugiyama (2)	(Romania) Edina Gallovits (Belarus) Olga Govortsova	6–2, 6–2
Berlin Singles – Doubles	(Russia) Dinara Safina*	(Russia) Elena Dementieva	3–6, 6–2, 6–2	(Zimbabwe) Cara Black (United States) Liezel Huber	(Spain) Nuria Llagostera Vives (Spain) María José Martínez Sánchez	3–6, 6–2, [10–2]
Rome Singles – Doubles	(Serbia) Jelena Janković	(France) Alizé Cornet	6–2, 6–2	(Chinese Taipei) Chan Latisha* (Chinese Taipei) Chuang Chia-jung*	(Czech Republic) Iveta Benešová (Slovakia) Janette Husárová	7–6^{(7–5)}, 6–3
Montréal Singles – Doubles	(Russia) Dinara Safina (2)	(Slovakia) Dominika Cibulková	6–2, 6–1	(Zimbabwe) Cara Black (2) (United States) Liezel Huber (2)	(Russia) Maria Kirilenko (Italy) Flavia Pennetta	6–1, 6–1
Tokyo Singles – Doubles	(Russia) Dinara Safina (3)	(Russia) Svetlana Kuznetsova	6–1, 6–3	(United States) Vania King*	(United States) Lisa Raymond (Australia) Samantha Stosur	6–1, 6–4
Tokyo Singles – Doubles	(Russia) Dinara Safina (3)	(Russia) Svetlana Kuznetsova	6–1, 6–3	(Russia) Nadia Petrova	(United States) Lisa Raymond (Australia) Samantha Stosur	6–1, 6–4
Moscow Singles – Doubles	(Serbia) Jelena Janković (2)	(Russia) Vera Zvonareva	6–2, 6–4	(Russia) Nadia Petrova (2) (Slovenia) Katarina Srebotnik (3)	(Zimbabwe) Cara Black (United States) Liezel Huber	6–4, 6–4

== Tournament details ==
=== Doha ===
Tournament name	Qatar Total Open
Surface	Hard/Outdoors
Location	Doha, Qatar
Prize money	$2,500,000

==== Singles ====
Third Round
1	(Serbia) A Ivanovic
16	(Poland) A Radwańska	w/o
(Slovakia) D Cibulková	6	6
6	(United States) V Williams	3	3
4	(Russia) M Sharapova	6	6
Q	(Thailand) T Tanasugarn	2	2
(Spain) A Medina Garrigues	6	6^{3}	3
(Denmark) C Wozniacki	3	7^{7}	6
(China) N Li	6	6
12	(Israel) S Pe'er	1	3
(Japan) A Sugiyama	1	2
3	(Serbia) J Janković	6	6
(Russia) V Zvonareva	7	6
11	(Russia) D Safina	5	3
15	(Austria) S Bammer	6	7^{10}
2	(Russia) S Kuznetsova	3	6^{8}

Quarter-finals
16	(Poland) A Radwańska	6	6^{1}	6
(Slovakia) D Cibulková	4	7^{7}	4
4	(Russia) M Sharapova	6	6
(Denmark) C Wozniacki	0	1
(China) N Li	6	6
3	(Serbia) J Janković	3	4
(Russia) V Zvonareva	2	6	6
15	(Austria) S Bammer	6	2	0

Semi-finals
16	(Poland) A Radwańska	4	3
4	(Russia) M Sharapova	6	6
(China) N Li	6	3	3
(Russia) V Zvonareva	3	6	6

Final
4	(Russia) M Sharapova	6	2	6
(Russia) V Zvonareva	1	6	0

==== Doubles ====
Quarterfinals
1	(Zimbabwe) Black / (United States) Huber	6	6^{1}	10
7	(Spain) Medina / (Spain) Ruano	2	7^{7}	2
4	(Chinese Taipei) Chan / (Chinese Taipei) Chuang	6	4	6
WC	(Czech Republic) Šafářová / (Russia) Zvonareva	4	6	10
(Slovakia) Husárová / (Poland) Radwańska	6^{6}	1
3	(Czech Republic) Peschke / (Australia) Stubbs	7^{8}	6
(Japan) Morita / (Romania) Niculescu	3	2
2	(Slovenia) Srebotnik / (Japan) Sugiyama	6	6

Semi-finals
1	(Zimbabwe) Black / (United States) Huber	7	6
WC	(Czech Republic) Šafářová / (Russia) Zvonareva	5	2
3	(Czech Republic) Peschke / (Australia) Stubbs	6	6
2	(Slovenia) Srebotnik / (Japan) Sugiyama	2	0

Final
1	(Zimbabwe) Black / (United States) Huber	1	7	7
3	(Czech Republic) Peschke / (Australia) Stubbs	6	5	10

=== Indian Wells ===
Tournament name	Pacific Life Open
Surface	Hard/Outdoors
Location	Indian Wells, California, United States
Prize money	$2,100,000

==== Singles ====
Fourth Round
1	(Serbia) A Ivanovic	2	7	6
13	(Italy) F Schiavone	6	5	2
12	(Russia) V Zvonareva	6^{5}	6	6
(Australia) C Dellacqua	7^{7}	0	4
3	(Serbia) J Janković	6	6
20	(Spain) A Medina Garrigues	3	3
24	(United States) L Davenport	6	7
6	(France) M Bartoli	2	5
5	(Slovakia) D Hantuchová	6	7^{7}
21	(India) S Mirza	1	6^{4}
15	(Ukraine) A Bondarenko	2	7	4
4	(Russia) M Sharapova	6	5	6
(United States) A Harkleroad	6	2	4
10	(Poland) A Radwańska	4	6	6
(Denmark) C Wozniacki	2	3
2	(Russia) S Kuznetsova	6	6

Quarter-finals
1	(Serbia) A Ivanovic	6	6
12	(Russia) V Zvonareva	1	4
3	(Serbia) J Janković	6	0
24	(United States) L Davenport	2	0^{r}
5	(Slovakia) D Hantuchová	6^{2}	1
4	(Russia) M Sharapova	7^{7}	6
10	(Poland) A Radwańska	2	4
2	(Russia) S Kuznetsova	6	6

Semi-finals
1	(Serbia) A Ivanovic	7^{7}	6
3	(Serbia) J Janković	6^{3}	3
4	(Russia) M Sharapova	3	7	2
2	(Russia) S Kuznetsova	6	5	6

Final
1	(Serbia) A Ivanovic	6	6
2	(Russia) S Kuznetsova	4	3

==== Doubles ====
Quarterfinals
(Ukraine) Koryttseva / (Czech Republic) Uhlířová	6^{7}	3
8	(Slovakia) Hantuchová / (Japan) Sugiyama	7^{9}	6
4	(Ukraine) Bondarenko / (Ukraine) Bondarenko	6	5	7
(Russia) Safina / (Russia) Vesnina	3	7	10
(Czech Republic) Benešová / (Poland) Radwańska	0	4
3	(China) Yan / (China) Zheng	6	6
7	(United States) Mattek / (India) Mirza	7	4	11
2	(Chinese Taipei) Chan / (Chinese Taipei) Chuang	5	6	9

Semi-finals
8	(Slovakia) Hantuchová / (Japan) Sugiyama	3	4
(Russia) Safina / (Russia) Vesnina	6	6
3	(China) Yan / (China) Zheng	6^{4}	7	10
7	(United States) Mattek / (India) Mirza	7^{7}	5	5

Final
(Russia) Safina / (Russia) Vesnina	6	1	10
3	(China) Yan / (China) Zheng	1	6	8

=== Miami ===
Tournament name	Sony Ericsson Open
Surface	Hard/Outdoors
Location	Miami, Florida, United States
Prize money	$4,500,000

==== Singles ====
Fourth Round
1	(Belgium) J Henin	6	6
(Russia) E Vesnina	2	2
(Estonia) K Kanepi	3	3
8	(United States) S Williams	6	6
3	(Russia) S Kuznetsova	7^{7}	6
16	(Israel) S Pe'er	6^{4}	3
(Denmark) C Wozniacki	3	3
6	(United States) V Williams	6	6
WC	(Germany) S Lisicki	3	2
10	(Russia) E Dementieva	6	6
(China) J Zheng	4	5
4	(Serbia) J Janković	6	7
(Japan) A Sugiyama	2	7^{7}	0
19	(Russia) V Zvonareva	6	6^{5}	6
13	(Russia) D Safina	6	6
32	(United States) L Davenport	3	4

Quarter-finals
1	(Belgium) J Henin	2	0
8	(United States) S Williams	6	6
3	(Russia) S Kuznetsova	6	6
6	(United States) V Williams	4	4
10	(Russia) E Dementieva	1	1^{r}
4	(Serbia) J Janković	6	3
19	(Russia) V Zvonareva	7	6
13	(Russia) D Safina	5	4

Semi-finals
8	(United States) S Williams	3	7	6
3	(Russia) S Kuznetsova	6	5	3
4	(Serbia) J Janković	6	6
19	(Russia) V Zvonareva	1	4

Final
8	(United States) S Williams	6	5	6
4	(Serbia) J Janković	1	7	3

==== Doubles ====
Quarterfinals
1	(Zimbabwe) Black / (United States) Huber	6	4	10
(China) Peng / (China) Sun	3	6	6
3	(Czech Republic) Peschke / (Australia) Stubbs	3	6	10
8	(Russia) Likhovtseva / (United States) Raymond	6	3	6
7	(Belarus) Azarenka / (Israel) Pe'er	7	4	10
WC	(Russia) Kuznetsova / (France) Mauresmo	5	6	6
WC	(United States) Davenport / (Slovakia) Hantuchová	4	6	4
2	(Slovenia) Srebotnik / (Japan) Sugiyama	6	3	10

Semi-finals
1	(Zimbabwe) Black / (United States) Huber	6	6
3	(Czech Republic) Peschke / (Australia) Stubbs	3	3
7	(Belarus) Azarenka / (Israel) Pe'er	0	3
2	(Slovenia) Srebotnik / (Japan) Sugiyama	6	6

Final
1	(Zimbabwe) Black / (United States) Huber	5	6	3
2	(Slovenia) Srebotnik / (Japan) Sugiyama	7	4	10

=== Charleston ===
Tournament name	Family Circle Cup
Surface	Green Clay/Outdoors
Location	Charleston, South Carolina, United States
Prize money	$1,340,000

==== Singles ====
Third Round
1	(Serbia) J Janković	6	6
(Russia) A Rodionova	0	2
9	(Russia) V Zvonareva	6	4	6
6	(France) M Bartoli	4	6	1
4	(Russia) E Dementieva	6	7
13	(Belarus) V Azarenka	4	5
11	(Poland) A Radwańska	3	2
7	(Switzerland) P Schnyder	6	6
8	(Russia) D Safina	2	5
10	(Hungary) Á Szávay	6	7
(France) A Cornet	6	7
(Romania) S Cîrstea	1	5
5	(United States) S Williams	4	6	6
12	(Slovenia) K Srebotnik	6	4	3
(Ukraine) T Perebiynis	5	2
2	(Russia) M Sharapova	7	6

Quarter-finals
1	(Serbia) J Janković	2	6	2
9	(Russia) V Zvonareva	6	3	6
4	(Russia) E Dementieva	6	6
7	(Switzerland) P Schnyder	4	4
10	(Hungary) Á Szávay	5	4
(France) A Cornet	7	6
5	(United States) S Williams	7	4	6
2	(Russia) M Sharapova	5	6	1

Semi-finals
9	(Russia) V Zvonareva	6	6^{2}	6
4	(Russia) E Dementieva	3	7^{7}	3
(France) A Cornet	5	3
5	(United States) S Williams	7	6

Final
9	(Russia) V Zvonareva	4	6	3
5	(United States) S Williams	6	3	6

==== Doubles ====
Quarterfinals
1	(Zimbabwe) Black / (United States) Huber
5	(Russia) Safina / (Hungary) Szávay	w	/	o
3	(Czech Republic) Peschke / (Australia) Stubbs	2	2
(Romania) Gallovits / (Belarus) Govortsova	6	6
8	(Belarus) Azarenka / (Russia) Vesnina	6	1	10
4	(Chinese Taipei) Chan / (Chinese Taipei) Chuang	2	6	2
6	(Russia) Likhovtseva / (United States) Raymond	7^{7}	4	7
2	(Slovenia) Srebotnik / (Japan) Sugiyama	6^{5}	6	10

Semi-finals
1	(Zimbabwe) Black / (United States) Huber	4	6	[7]
(Romania) Gallovits / (Belarus) Govortsova	6	4	[10]
8	(Belarus) Azarenka / (Russia) Vesnina	1	1
2	(Slovenia) Srebotnik / (Japan) Sugiyama	6	6

Final
(Romania) Gallovits / (Belarus) Govortsova	2	2
2	(Slovenia) Srebotnik / (Japan) Sugiyama	6	6

=== Berlin ===
Tournament name	Qatar Telecom German Open
Surface	Clay/Outdoors
Location	Berlin, Germany
Prize money	$1,340,000

==== Singles ====
Third Round
1	(Belgium) J Henin	7	3	1
13	(Russia) D Safina	5	6	6
11	(Poland) A Radwańska	3	1
5	(United States) S Williams	6	6
3	(Russia) S Kuznetsova	6	2	2
15	(Ukraine) A Bondarenko	1	6	6
(Argentina) G Dulko	3	1
(Belarus) V Azarenka	6	6
7	(Russia) E Dementieva	7	6
(Russia) V Dushevina	5	3
(Russia) M Kirilenko	2	4
4	(Serbia) J Janković	6	6
8	(France) M Bartoli	5	5
10	(Hungary) Á Szávay	7	7
(Austria) S Bammer	5	6	4
2	(Serbia) A Ivanovic	7	4	6

Quarter-finals
13	(Russia) D Safina	2	6	7^{7}
5	(United States) S Williams	6	1	6^{5}
15	(Ukraine) A Bondarenko	6^{2}	2
(Belarus) V Azarenka	7^{7}	6
7	(Russia) E Dementieva	6	2	6
4	(Serbia) J Janković	3	6	3
10	(Hungary) Á Szávay	6	4	3
2	(Serbia) A Ivanovic	3	6	6

Semi-finals
13	(Russia) D Safina	6	6
(Belarus) V Azarenka	4	1
7	(Russia) E Dementieva	6	7
2	(Serbia) A Ivanovic	2	5

Final
13	(Russia) D Safina	3	6	6
7	(Russia) E Dementieva	6	2	2

==== Doubles ====
Quarterfinals
1	(Zimbabwe) Black / (United States) Huber	7^{7}	6
(China) Peng / (China) Sun	6^{4}	4
4	(Belarus) Azarenka / (Israel) Pe'er	6	7
5	(Ukraine) Bondarenko / (Ukraine) Bondarenko	1	5
(Spain) Vives / (Spain) Sánchez	7	6
(Belarus) Poutchek / (Russia) Rodionova	5	1
6	(Russia) Safina / (Russia) Vesnina	6	3	8
2	(Czech Republic) Peschke / (Australia) Stubbs	4	6	10

Semi-finals
1	(Zimbabwe) Black / (United States) Huber	3
4	(Belarus) Azarenka / (Israel) Pe'er	0^{r}
(Spain) Vives / (Spain) Sánchez	6	3	16
2	(Czech Republic) Peschke / (Australia) Stubbs	2	6	14

Final
1	(Zimbabwe) Black / (United States) Huber	3	6	10
(Spain) Vives / (Spain) Sánchez	6	2	2

=== Rome ===
Tournament name	Internazionali BNL d'Italia
Surface	Clay/Outdoors
Location	Rome, Italy
Prize money	$1,340,000

==== Singles ====
Third Round
Q	(Bulgaria) T Pironkova	6	1
WC	(Belarus) V Azarenka	2	0^{r}
12	(Poland) A Radwańska	4	6	1
6	(Russia) A Chakvetadze	6	1	6
3	(Russia) S Kuznetsova	2	4
Q	(France) A Cornet	6	6
WC	(Italy) S Errani	4	3
5	(United States) S Williams	6	6
7	(United States) V Williams	7	6
10	(Russia) V Zvonareva	5	2
(Russia) M Kirilenko	1	1
4	(Serbia) J Janković	6	6
8	(France) M Bartoli	6	4	6^{7}
9	(Switzerland) P Schnyder	4	6	7^{9}
(Denmark) C Wozniacki	4	6^{3}
2	(Russia) M Sharapova	6	7^{7}

Quarter-finals
Q	(Bulgaria) T Pironkova	2	6	1
6	(Russia) A Chakvetadze	6	3	6
Q	(France) A Cornet
5	(United States) S Williams	w	/	o
7	(United States) V Williams	7	2	3
4	(Serbia) J Janković	5	6	6
9	(Switzerland) P Schnyder	7^{7}	5	2
2	(Russia) M Sharapova	6^{3}	7	6

Semi-finals
6	(Russia) A Chakvetadze	6	4	3
Q	(France) A Cornet	3	6	6
4	(Serbia) J Janković
2	(Russia) M Sharapova	w	/	o

Final
Q	(France) A Cornet	2	2
4	(Serbia) J Janković	6	6

==== Doubles ====
Quarterfinals
1	(Zimbabwe) Black / (United States) Huber	6	5	6
(China) Peng / (China) Sun	4	7	10
3	(Czech Republic) Peschke / (Australia) Stubbs	5	2
5	(Chinese Taipei) Chan / (Chinese Taipei) Chuang	7	6
(Czech Republic) Benešová / (Slovakia) Husárová	6^{4}	6	10
(Russia) Kirilenko / (Poland) Radwańska	7^{7}	3	4
(Spain) Garrigues / (Spain) Ruano Pascual	7^{7}	3	9
(Poland) Jans / (Bosnia and Herzegovina) Jugić-Salkić	6^{2}	6	11

Semi-finals
(China) Peng / (China) Sun	4	2
5	(Chinese Taipei) Chan / (Chinese Taipei) Chuang	6	6
(Czech Republic) Benešová / (Slovakia) Husárová	5	6	10
(Poland) Jans / (Bosnia and Herzegovina) Jugić-Salkić	7	3	2

Final
5	(Chinese Taipei) Chan / (Chinese Taipei) Chuang	7^{7}	6
(Czech Republic) Benešová / (Slovakia) Husárová	6^{5}	3

=== Montreal ===
Tournament name	Rogers Cup
Surface	Hard/Outdoors
Location	Montreal, Canada
Prize money	$1,340,000

==== Singles ====
Third Round
1	(Serbia) A Ivanovic	2	6	2
(Austria) T Paszek	6	1	6
11	(Belarus) V Azarenka	7^{7}	2
(France) V Razzano	6^{4}	0^{r}
4	(Russia) S Kuznetsova	7	2	6
Q	(Portugal) M Larcher de Brito	5	6	4
9	(Switzerland) P Schnyder	2	2
7	(Russia) D Safina	6	6
6	(Russia) A Chakvetadze	6	5	6^{4}
10	(France) M Bartoli	4	7	7^{7}
(Japan) A Sugiyama	w	/	o
3	(Russia) M Sharapova
(Slovakia) D Cibulková	7^{7}	6
12	(Russia) N Petrova	6^{2}	2
WC	(Canada) S Dubois	3	2
2	(Serbia) J Janković	6	6

Quarter-finals
(Austria) T Paszek	4	5
11	(Belarus) V Azarenka	6	7
4	(Russia) S Kuznetsova	6	3	2
7	(Russia) D Safina	2	6	6
10	(France) M Bartoli	6	6
(Japan) A Sugiyama	2	3
(Slovakia) D Cibulková	7	6
2	(Serbia) J Janković	5	2

Semi-finals
11	(Belarus) V Azarenka	0	6	3
7	(Russia) D Safina	6	2	6
10	(France) M Bartoli	6	4	3
(Slovakia) D Cibulková	4	6	6

Final
7	(Russia) D Safina	6	6
(Slovakia) D Cibulková	2	1

==== Doubles ====
Quarterfinals
1	(Zimbabwe) Black / (United States) Huber	6	6
(Canada) Dubois / (Germany) Lisicki	4	1
(Canada) Pelletier / (Thailand) Tanasugarn	3	4
7	(Russia) Vesnina / (Russia) Zvonareva	6	6
5	(Belarus) Poutchek / (Russia) Rodionova	7	0	7
(Russia) Kirilenko / (Italy) Pennetta	6^{4}	6	10
(Japan) Morita / (Japan) Sugiyama	5	6^{6}
2	(Czech Republic) Peschke / (Australia) Stubbs	7	7

Semi-finals
1	(Zimbabwe) Black / (United States) Huber	w	/	o
7	(Russia) Vesnina / (Russia) Zvonareva
(Russia) Kirilenko / (Italy) Pennetta	6	6
2	(Czech Republic) Peschke / (Australia) Stubbs	4	0

Final
1	(Zimbabwe) Black / (United States) Huber	6	6
(Russia) Kirilenko / (Italy) Pennetta	1	1

=== Tokyo ===
Tournament name	Toray Pan Pacific Open
Surface	Hard/Outdoors
Location	Tokyo, Japan
Prize money	$1,340,000

==== Singles ====
Second Round
1	(Serbia) J Janković	6	6
(Italy) F Pennetta	2	1
WC	(Japan) A Morita	1	1
5	(Russia) S Kuznetsova	6	6
3	(Russia) E Dementieva	6	6
(France) A Cornet	0	3
Q	(Slovenia) K Srebotnik	6	6
(Italy) F Schiavone	4	3
Q	(Estonia) K Kanepi	6	6
(France) V Razzano	4	2
(Slovakia) D Cibulková	3	4
4	(Russia) D Safina	6	6
6	(Poland) A Radwańska	6	6
(France) M Bartoli	2	3
(Russia) N Petrova	6	1	6
2	(Serbia) A Ivanovic	1	6	2

Quarter-finals
1	(Serbia) J Janković	6	5	5
5	(Russia) S Kuznetsova	2	7	7
3	(Russia) E Dementieva	3	4
Q	(Slovenia) K Srebotnik	6	6
Q	(Estonia) K Kanepi	4	7^{7}	2
4	(Russia) D Safina	6	6^{5}	6
6	(Poland) A Radwańska	3	0
(Russia) N Petrova	6	6

Semi-finals
5	(Russia) S Kuznetsova	7^{7}	6
Q	(Slovenia) K Srebotnik	6^{5}	2
4	(Russia) D Safina	6	6
(Russia) N Petrova	1	0

Final
5	(Russia) S Kuznetsova	1	3
4	(Russia) D Safina	6	6

==== Doubles ====
Quarterfinals
(United States) King / (Russia) Petrova	6	6
(Kazakhstan) Shvedova / (Thailand) Tanasugarn	0	3
4	(Chinese Taipei) Chuang / (Chinese Taipei) Hsieh	w	/	o
(Russia) Kirilenko / (Italy) Pennetta
WC	(Russia) Chakvetadze / (Poland) Radwańska	2	4
3	(Australia) Dellacqua / (Italy) Schiavone	6	6
(Slovakia) Hantuchová / (Hungary) Szávay	7	3	2
2	(United States) Raymond / (Australia) Stosur	5	6	10

Semi-finals
(United States) King / (Russia) Petrova	6	6
4	(Chinese Taipei) Chuang / (Chinese Taipei) Hsieh	3	4
3	(Australia) Dellacqua / (Italy) Schiavone	5	1
2	(United States) Raymond / (Australia) Stosur	7	6

Final
(United States) King / (Russia) Petrova	6	6
2	(United States) Raymond / (Australia) Stosur	1	4

=== Moscow ===
Tournament name	Kremlin Cup
Surface	Carpet/Indoors
Location	Moscow, Russia
Prize money	$1,340,000

==== Singles ====
Second Round
1	(Serbia) J Janković	6^{6}	6	6
WC	(Russia) V Dushevina	7^{8}	3	2
WC	(Russia) E Makarova	6	4	4
(Italy) F Pennetta	3	6	6
3	(Russia) E Dementieva	6	4	7^{7}
Q	(Slovenia) K Srebotnik	3	6	6^{2}
(Russia) N Petrova	6	3
(Denmark) C Wozniacki	4	2^{r}
7	(Russia) V Zvonareva	6	6
(Slovakia) D Hantuchová	1	0
(Slovakia) D Cibulková	3	6	7^{7}
4	(Serbia) A Ivanovic	6	2	6^{4}
5	(Russia) S Kuznetsova	7^{7}	6
Q	(Italy) S Errani	6^{0}	1
(France) A Mauresmo	7^{7}	4	4
2	(Russia) D Safina	6^{2}	6	6

Quarter-finals
1	(Serbia) J Janković	7^{8}	6
(Italy) F Pennetta	6^{6}	3
3	(Russia) E Dementieva	6	4	7^{8}
(Russia) N Petrova	4	6	6^{6}
7	(Russia) V Zvonareva	7	6
(Slovakia) D Cibulková	5	4
5	(Russia) S Kuznetsova	4	5
2	(Russia) D Safina	6	7

Semi-finals
1	(Serbia) J Janković	0	6	6
3	(Russia) E Dementieva	6	1	0
7	(Russia) V Zvonareva	6	7^{7}
2	(Russia) D Safina	2	6^{5}

Final
1	(Serbia) J Janković	6	6
7	(Russia) V Zvonareva	2	4

==== Doubles ====
Quarterfinals
1	(Zimbabwe) Black / (United States) Huber	6	4	10
WC	(Serbia) Ivanovic / (Italy) Schiavone	2	6	7
(Russia) Kirilenko / (Italy) Pennetta	6^{1}	6	10
(Russia) Makarova / (Russia) Voskoboeva	7^{7}	1	5
(Russia) Dushevina / (Russia) Kudryavtseva	0	5
4	(Russia) Petrova / (Slovenia) Srebotnik	6	7
(Romania) Niculescu / (Kazakhstan) Shvedova	4	6	10
2	(Czech Republic) Peschke / (Australia) Stubbs	6	0	7

Semi-finals
1	(Zimbabwe) Black / (United States) Huber	6	6
(Russia) Kirilenko / (Italy) Pennetta	1	0
4	(Russia) Petrova / (Slovenia) Srebotnik	6	6
(Romania) Niculescu / (Kazakhstan) Shvedova	3	2

Final
1	(Zimbabwe) Black / (United States) Huber	4	4
4	(Russia) Petrova / (Slovenia) Srebotnik	6	6

== See also ==
- WTA Tier I events
- 2008 WTA Tour
- 2008 ATP Masters Series
- 2008 ATP Tour
