= 2008 Maria Sharapova tennis season =

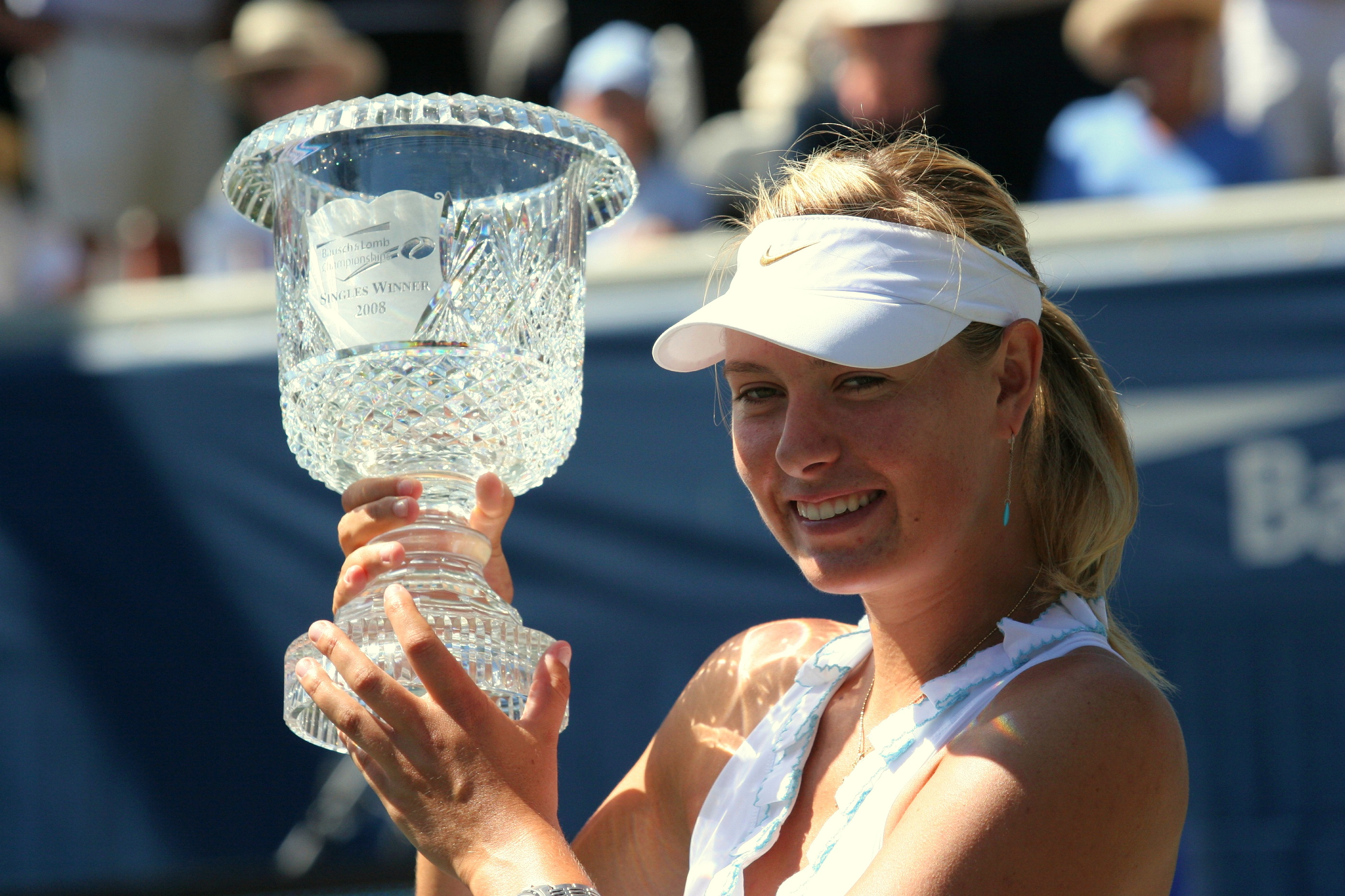
- Maria Sharapova won her first clay court title at Amelia Island
- Full name: Maria Sharapova
- Country: Russia

Singles
- Season record: 32–4
- Calendar titles: 3
- Year-end ranking: No. 9
- Ranking change from previous year: ▼4

Grand Slam & significant results
- Australian Open: W
- French Open: 4R
- Wimbledon: 2R
- US Open: DNP
- Olympic Games: DNP

Injuries
- Injuries: Shoulder surgery (October 2008)
- Notes: Missed her first Major tournament (2008 US Open) since her professional debut in 2003.
- Last updated on: 3 February 2013.

Results and statistics from Maria Sharapova's 2008 tennis season.

== Yearly summary ==
=== Australian Open series ===
Sharapova began her season at the Australian Open, as the 5th seed. She won the tournament without dropping a set (or playing a tie-break set), as she gained redemption following the previous year's heavy defeat in the final to Serena Williams. En route, she defeated Lindsay Davenport in the second round, served three bagels (one each to Elena Vesnina, Elena Dementieva and World No. 1 Justine Henin, whom she defeated very impressively in the quarter-finals) and defeated Jelena Janković (who had defeated the defending champion Williams in the quarter-finals) in the semi-finals, before facing Serbian Ana Ivanovic in the final. In a match dubbed as the "Glam Slam final", Sharapova upset the highly fancied Serb in straight sets to claim her first Australian Open title, and third Major title.

=== Middle East series ===
After playing two Fed Cup rubbers for Russia to kick off February, Sharapova then competed at the Qatar Ladies Open. She defeated Galina Voskoboeva, Tamarine Tanasugarn, Caroline Wozniacki and Agnieszka Radwańska (who had benefited from the withdrawal of top seed Ana Ivanovic in the third round) before facing (and defeating in three sets) Vera Zvonareva in the final.

Sharapova then withdrew from Dubai due to a viral infection.

=== Indian Wells & Miami ===
Sharapova reached the semi-finals at Indian Wells for the third time in four years, but was defeated there by compatriot and eventual runner-up Svetlana Kuznetsova, bringing an end to her 18-match winning streak to start the season. Following Indian Wells, Sharapova withdrew from Miami, citing a recurring shoulder injury.

=== Clay court season ===
==== American clay court season ====
After withdrawing from Miami, Sharapova won her first career clay court title in Amelia Island, defeating Dominika Cibulková in the final. At Charleston, she lost to eventual champion Serena Williams in the quarter-finals.

==== European clay court season ====
After deciding to skip the 2008 Qatar Telecom German Open, Sharapova next played at the Internazionali BNL d'Italia, reaching the semi-finals before being forced to withdraw from her match against eventual champion Jelena Janković due to a calf injury.

Following Justine Henin's surprise retirement during the same week as the Rome event, Sharapova was elevated to World No. 1 in the rankings. Subsequently, she was named as the top seed at the French Open, which she needed to win to complete a Career Grand Slam (and thus protect her top ranking). After surviving a close final set against compatriot Evgeniya Rodina in the first round, and another three-setter against Bethanie Mattek in the second, Sharapova fell in the fourth round in three sets to eventual finalist Dinara Safina, having held several match points in the second set. As a result, she lost her World No. 1 ranking, after just three weeks, to Ana Ivanovic, who went on to win the tournament.

=== Wimbledon ===
Sharapova's 2008 Wimbledon campaign turned out to be short-lived, as she was defeated in the second round by Alla Kudryavtseva, in the process suffering her earliest ever defeat at Wimbledon, and her earliest defeat at a Major tournament since the 2003 US Open.

=== US Open series and shoulder injury ===
Sharapova next played at the 2008 Rogers Cup, however she had to withdraw following her second round win against Marta Domachowska due to a recurring shoulder injury, which ended up being serious enough to necessitate surgery. As a result, Sharapova was forced to withdraw from her remaining tournaments for the year, including the Olympic tennis tournament in Beijing, the US Open (thus missing her first Major tournament since her debut in 2003) and the year-end championships. Her withdrawals from those events eventually led to her finishing the year ranked World No. 9, her lowest year-end singles ranking since 2003.

== All matches ==
This table chronicles all the matches of Sharapova in 2008, including walkovers (W/O) which the WTA does not count as wins. They are marked ND for non-decision or no decision.

Key
W	F	SF	QF	#R	RR	Q#	P#	DNQ	A	Z#	PO	G	S	B	NMS	NTI	P	NH

(W) winner; (F) finalist; (SF) semifinalist; (QF) quarterfinalist; (#R) rounds 4, 3, 2, 1; (RR) round-robin stage; (Q#) qualification round; (P#) preliminary round; (DNQ) did not qualify; (A) absent; (Z#) Davis/Fed Cup Zonal Group (with number indication) or (PO) play-off; (G) gold, (S) silver or (B) bronze Olympic/Paralympic medal; (NMS) not a Masters tournament; (NTI) not a Tier I tournament; (P) postponed; (NH) not held; (SR) strike rate (events won / competed); (W–L) win–loss record.
To avoid confusion and double counting, these charts are updated at the conclusion of a tournament or when the player's participation has ended.

=== Singles matches ===
Tournament	#	Round	Opponent	Result	Score
Australian Open; Melbourne, Australia; Grand Slam; Hard, outdoor 14–27 January 2008
Australian Open; Melbourne, Australia; Grand Slam; Hard, outdoor 14–27 January 2008	1	1R	(Croatia) Jelena Kostanić Tošić	Win	6–4, 6–3
Australian Open; Melbourne, Australia; Grand Slam; Hard, outdoor 14–27 January 2008	2	2R	(United States) Lindsay Davenport	Win	6–1, 6–3
Australian Open; Melbourne, Australia; Grand Slam; Hard, outdoor 14–27 January 2008	3	3R	(Russia) Elena Vesnina	Win	6–3, 6–0
Australian Open; Melbourne, Australia; Grand Slam; Hard, outdoor 14–27 January 2008	4	4R	(Russia) Elena Dementieva	Win	6–2, 6–0
Australian Open; Melbourne, Australia; Grand Slam; Hard, outdoor 14–27 January 2008	5	QF	(Belgium) Justine Henin	Win	6–4, 6–0
Australian Open; Melbourne, Australia; Grand Slam; Hard, outdoor 14–27 January 2008	6	SF	(Serbia) Jelena Janković	Win	6–3, 6–1
Australian Open; Melbourne, Australia; Grand Slam; Hard, outdoor 14–27 January 2008	7	W	(Serbia) Ana Ivanovic	Win (1)	7–5, 6–3
Fed Cup WG 1st Round; Ramat HaSharon, Israel; Hard, indoor 2–3 February 2008	8	1R; R2	(Israel) Tzipora Obziler	Win	6–0, 6–4
Fed Cup WG 1st Round; Ramat HaSharon, Israel; Hard, indoor 2–3 February 2008	9	1R; R3	(Israel) Shahar Pe'er	Win	6–1, 6–1
Qatar Ladies Open; Doha, Qatar; Tier I Hard, outdoor 18–24 February 2008
Qatar Ladies Open; Doha, Qatar; Tier I Hard, outdoor 18–24 February 2008		1R	Bye		
Qatar Ladies Open; Doha, Qatar; Tier I Hard, outdoor 18–24 February 2008	10	2R	(Russia) Galina Voskoboeva	Win	6–4, 4–6, 6–1
Qatar Ladies Open; Doha, Qatar; Tier I Hard, outdoor 18–24 February 2008	11	3R	(Thailand) Tamarine Tanasugarn	Win	6–2, 6–2
Qatar Ladies Open; Doha, Qatar; Tier I Hard, outdoor 18–24 February 2008	12	QF	(Denmark) Caroline Wozniacki	Win	6–0, 6–1
Qatar Ladies Open; Doha, Qatar; Tier I Hard, outdoor 18–24 February 2008	13	SF	(Poland) Agnieszka Radwańska	Win	6–4, 6–3
Qatar Ladies Open; Doha, Qatar; Tier I Hard, outdoor 18–24 February 2008	14	W	(Russia) Vera Zvonareva	Win (2)	6–1, 2–6, 6–0
Pacific Life Open; Indian Wells, United States of America; Tier I Hard, outdoor 9 March–23 April 2008
Pacific Life Open; Indian Wells, United States of America; Tier I Hard, outdoor 9 March–23 April 2008		1R	Bye		
Pacific Life Open; Indian Wells, United States of America; Tier I Hard, outdoor 9 March–23 April 2008	15	2R	(France) Stéphanie Cohen-Aloro	Win	6–1, 6–0
Pacific Life Open; Indian Wells, United States of America; Tier I Hard, outdoor 9 March–23 April 2008	16	3R	(Greece) Eleni Daniilidou	Win	7–5, 6–3
Pacific Life Open; Indian Wells, United States of America; Tier I Hard, outdoor 9 March–23 April 2008	17	4R	(Ukraine) Alona Bondarenko	Win	6–2, 5–7, 6–4
Pacific Life Open; Indian Wells, United States of America; Tier I Hard, outdoor 9 March–23 April 2008	18	QF	(Slovakia) Daniela Hantuchová	Win	7–6^{(7–2)}, 6–1
Pacific Life Open; Indian Wells, United States of America; Tier I Hard, outdoor 9 March–23 April 2008	19	SF	(Russia) Svetlana Kuznetsova	Loss	3–6, 7–5, 2–6
Bausch and Lomb Championships; Amelia Island, United States of America; Tier II; Clay, outdoor 7–13 April 2008
Bausch and Lomb Championships; Amelia Island, United States of America; Tier II; Clay, outdoor 7–13 April 2008		1R	Bye		
Bausch and Lomb Championships; Amelia Island, United States of America; Tier II; Clay, outdoor 7–13 April 2008	20	2R	(Czech Republic) Barbora Záhlavová-Strýcová	Win	6–1, 6–3
Bausch and Lomb Championships; Amelia Island, United States of America; Tier II; Clay, outdoor 7–13 April 2008	21	3R	(Spain) Anabel Medina Garrigues	Win	7–6^{(7–3)}, 5–7, 7–6^{(7–1)}
Bausch and Lomb Championships; Amelia Island, United States of America; Tier II; Clay, outdoor 7–13 April 2008	22	QF	(Ukraine) Alona Bondarenko	Win	6–7^{(9–11)}, 6–3, 6–2
Bausch and Lomb Championships; Amelia Island, United States of America; Tier II; Clay, outdoor 7–13 April 2008		SF	(United States) Lindsay Davenport	Walkover	N/A
Bausch and Lomb Championships; Amelia Island, United States of America; Tier II; Clay, outdoor 7–13 April 2008	23	W	(Slovakia) Dominika Cibulková	Win (3)	7–6^{(9–7)}, 6–3
Family Circle Cup; Charleston, United States of America; Tier I Clay, outdoor 14–20 April 2008
Family Circle Cup; Charleston, United States of America; Tier I Clay, outdoor 14–20 April 2008		1R	Bye		
Family Circle Cup; Charleston, United States of America; Tier I Clay, outdoor 14–20 April 2008	24	2R	(United States) Bethanie Mattek	Win	6–0, 6–0
Family Circle Cup; Charleston, United States of America; Tier I Clay, outdoor 14–20 April 2008	25	3R	(Ukraine) Tatiana Perebiynis	Win	7–5, 6–2
Family Circle Cup; Charleston, United States of America; Tier I Clay, outdoor 14–20 April 2008	26	QF	(United States) Serena Williams	Loss	5–7, 6–4, 1–6
Internazionali BNL d'Italia; Rome, Italy; Tier I Clay, outdoor 12–18 May 2008
Internazionali BNL d'Italia; Rome, Italy; Tier I Clay, outdoor 12–18 May 2008		1R	Bye		
Internazionali BNL d'Italia; Rome, Italy; Tier I Clay, outdoor 12–18 May 2008	27	2R	(Slovakia) Dominika Cibulková	Win	6–2, 3–6, 6–4
Internazionali BNL d'Italia; Rome, Italy; Tier I Clay, outdoor 12–18 May 2008	28	3R	(Denmark) Caroline Wozniacki	Win	6–4, 7–6^{(7–3)}
Internazionali BNL d'Italia; Rome, Italy; Tier I Clay, outdoor 12–18 May 2008	29	QF	(Switzerland) Patty Schnyder	Win	6–7^{(3–7)}, 7–5, 6–2
Internazionali BNL d'Italia; Rome, Italy; Tier I Clay, outdoor 12–18 May 2008		SF	(Serbia) Jelena Janković	Withdrew	N/A
French Open; Paris, France; Grand Slam; Clay, outdoor 25 May–8 June 2008
French Open; Paris, France; Grand Slam; Clay, outdoor 25 May–8 June 2008	30	1R	(Russia) Evgeniya Rodina	Win	6–1, 3–6, 8–6
French Open; Paris, France; Grand Slam; Clay, outdoor 25 May–8 June 2008	31	2R	(United States) Bethanie Mattek	Win	6–2, 3–6, 6–2
French Open; Paris, France; Grand Slam; Clay, outdoor 25 May–8 June 2008	32	3R	(Italy) Karin Knapp	Win	7–6^{(7–4)}, 6–0
French Open; Paris, France; Grand Slam; Clay, outdoor 25 May–8 June 2008	33	4R	(Russia) Dinara Safina	Loss	7–6^{(8–6)}, 6–7^{(5–7)}, 2–6
The Championships, Wimbledon; London, Great Britain; Grand Slam; Grass, outdoor 23 June–6 July 2008
The Championships, Wimbledon; London, Great Britain; Grand Slam; Grass, outdoor 23 June–6 July 2008	34	1R	(France) Stéphanie Foretz	Win	6–1, 6–4
The Championships, Wimbledon; London, Great Britain; Grand Slam; Grass, outdoor 23 June–6 July 2008	35	2R	(Russia) Alla Kudryavtseva	Loss	2–6, 4–6
Rogers Cup; Montreal, Canada; Tier I Hard, outdoor 26 July–3 August 2008
Rogers Cup; Montreal, Canada; Tier I Hard, outdoor 26 July–3 August 2008		1R	Bye		
Rogers Cup; Montreal, Canada; Tier I Hard, outdoor 26 July–3 August 2008	36	2R	(Poland) Marta Domachowska	Win	7–5, 5–7, 6–2
Rogers Cup; Montreal, Canada; Tier I Hard, outdoor 26 July–3 August 2008		3R	(Japan) Ai Sugiyama	Withdrew	N/A

== Tournament schedule ==
=== Singles Schedule ===
Date	Championship	Location	Category	Surface	Prev. result	New result	Outcome
14 January 2008– 27 January 2008	Australian Open	Melbourne (AUS)	Grand Slam tournament	Hard	F	W	Won in the final against Ana Ivanovic
18 February 2008– 24 February 2008	Qatar Ladies Open	Doha (QAT)	Tier I	Hard		W	Won in the final against Vera Zvonareva
9 March 2008– 23 March 2008	Pacific Life Open	Indian Wells (USA)	Tier I	Hard	4R	SF	Lost in the semi-finals against Svetlana Kuznetsova
7 April 2008– 13 April 2008	Bausch and Lomb Championships	Amelia Island (USA)	Tier II	Clay	DNP	W	Won in the final against Dominika Cibulková
14 April 2008– 20 April 2008	Family Circle Cup	Charleston (USA)	Tier I	Clay	DNP	QF	Lost in the quarter-finals against Serena Williams
12 May 2008– 18 May 2008	Internazionali BNL d'Italia	Rome (ITA)	Tier I	Clay		SF	Withdrew before semi-final (against Jelena Janković)
26 May 2008– 8 June 2008	French Open	Paris (FRA)	Grand Slam	Clay	SF	4R	Lost in the fourth round against Dinara Safina
23 June 2008; 6 July 2008	The Championships, Wimbledon	London (GBR)	Grand Slam	Grass	4R	2R	Lost in the second round against Alla Kudryavtseva
26 July 2008– 3 August 2008	Rogers Cup	Montreal (CAN)	Tier I	Hard	DNP	3R	Withdrew before third round match (against Ai Sugiyama)

== Yearly Records ==
=== Head-to-head matchups ===
Ordered by percentage, number of victories to number of losses, then in alphabetical order

- (Ukraine) Alona Bondarenko 2–0
- (Slovakia) Dominika Cibulková 2–0
- (United States) Bethanie Mattek 2–0
- (Denmark) Caroline Wozniacki 2–0
- (France) Stéphanie Cohen-Aloro 1–0
- (Greece) Eleni Daniilidou 1–0
- (United States) Lindsay Davenport 1–0
- (Russia) Elena Dementieva 1–0
- (Poland) Marta Domachowska 1–0
- (France) Stéphanie Foretz 1–0
- (Slovakia) Daniela Hantuchová 1–0
- (Belgium) Justine Henin 1–0
- (Serbia) Ana Ivanovic 1–0
- (Serbia) Jelena Janković 1–0
- (Italy) Karin Knapp 1–0
- (Spain) Anabel Medina Garrigues 1–0
- (Israel) Tzipora Obziler 1–0
- (Israel) Shahar Pe'er 1–0
- (Poland) Agnieszka Radwańska 1–0
- (Russia) Evgeniya Rodina 1–0
- (Thailand) Tamarine Tanasugarn 1–0
- (Croatia) Jelena Kostanić Tošić 1–0
- (Ukraine) Tatiana Perebiynis 1–0
- (Switzerland) Patty Schnyder 1–0
- (Russia) Elena Vesnina 1–0
- (Russia) Galina Voskoboeva 1–0
- (Czech Republic) Barbora Záhlavová-Strýcová 1–0
- (Russia) Vera Zvonareva 1–0
- (Russia) Alla Kudryavtseva 0–1
- (Russia) Svetlana Kuznetsova 0–1
- (Russia) Dinara Safina 0–1
- (United States) Serena Williams 0–1

=== Finals ===
==== Singles: 3 (3–0) ====
Category Grand Slam (1–0) WTA Tier I (1–0) WTA Tier II (1–0)	Titles by surface Hard (2–0) Clay (1–0)	Titles by conditions Outdoors (3–0)

Outcome	No.	Date	Championship	Surface	Opponent in the final	Score in the final
Winner	17.	January 26, 2008	Melbourne, Australia (1)	Hard	(Serbia) Ana Ivanovic	7–5, 6–3
Winner	18.	February 24, 2008	Doha, Qatar (2)	Hard	(Russia) Vera Zvonareva	6–1, 2–6, 6–0
Winner	19.	April 13, 2008	(United States) Amelia Island, USA (1)	Clay	(Slovakia) Dominika Cibulková	7–6^{(9–7)}, 6–3

== See also ==
- 2008 Serena Williams tennis season
- 2008 WTA Tour
