= 2008 Serena Williams tennis season =

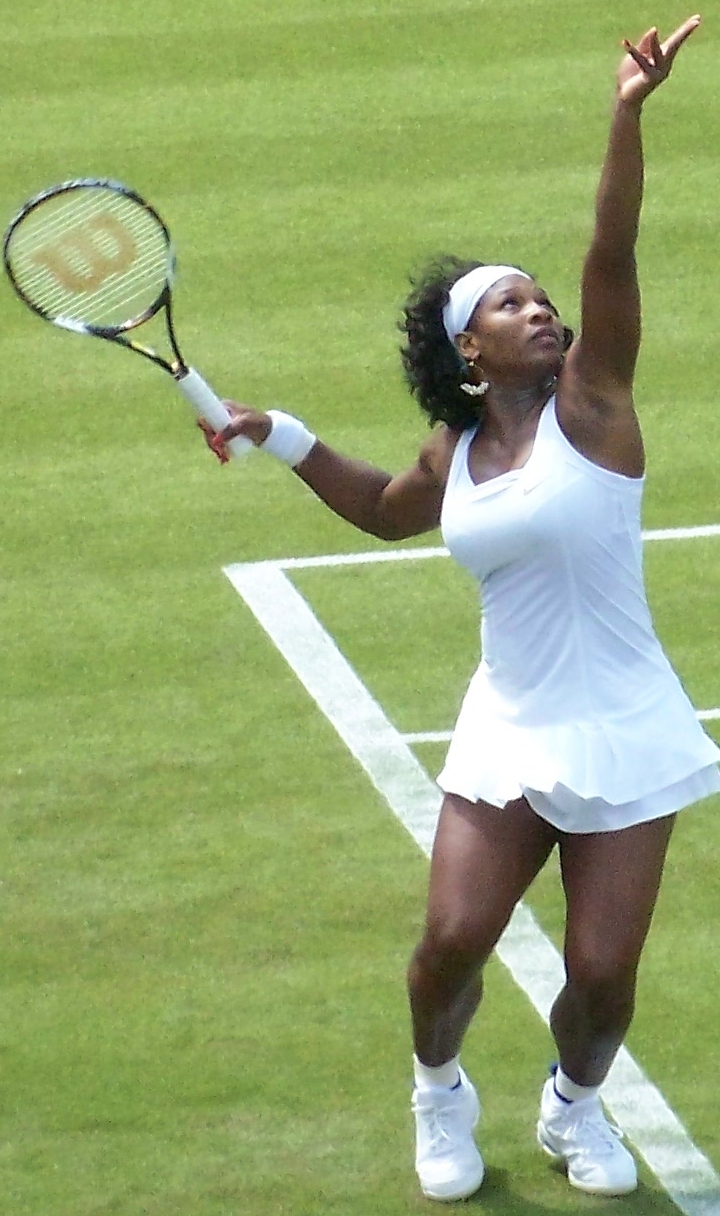
- Serena Williams at the Wimbledon Championships
- Full name: Serena Jameka Williams
- Country: United States
- Calendar prize money: $3,852,173

Singles
- Season record: 44–8 (85%)
- Calendar titles: 4
- Year-end ranking: 2
- Ranking change from previous year: ▲5

Grand Slam & significant results
- Australian Open: QF
- French Open: 3R
- Wimbledon: F
- US Open: W
- Championships: RR
- Olympic Games: QF

Doubles
- Season record: 16-2 (88.89%)
- Calendar titles: 2
- Year-end ranking: No. 28
- Ranking change from previous year: ▲NR

Grand Slam doubles results
- Australian Open: QF
- French Open: A
- Wimbledon: W
- US Open: A
- Olympic Games: Gold Medal

Serena Williams's 2008 tennis season officially began at the 2008 Australian Open. Williams finished the year ranked world no. 2, finishing in the top 5 for the first time since 2003. She also won her 9th slam at the US Open.

== Year in detail ==
=== Australian Open and early hard court season ===
==== Hopman Cup ====
Williams made her Australian Open preparation at the Hopman Cup representing United States with Mardy Fish. Williams missed the first tie against India, where Meghann Shaughnessy took her spot. Williams competed in the tie against Czech Republic represented by Tomáš Berdych and Lucie Šafářová, she played Šafářová in singles and won in three sets, taking the first set in a bagel and the third set in the twelfth game. She then paired with Fish and won after the Czech team retired after losing the first set in a bagel. In their third tie they took on Alicia Molik and Peter Luczak of Australia. Williams won her match against Molik, with a two break lead in the first and a second set tie-break. She and Fish then took the doubles in two easy sets. Winning all their three ties it send United States to the final. In the final they faced Serbia against Jelena Janković and Novak Djokovic, Janković withdraw from the singles with an upper right leg injury, which gave USA the lead, however Fish lost to Djokovic pushing them to a decisive mixed doubles match. Williams and Fish won the doubles in a tie-break in the first and at two in the second, handing them the Hopman Cup trophy, Williams' second.

==== Australian Open ====
Williams came into the Australian Open with a 14-match winning streak, missing the 2006 edition and winning the 2005 and 2007 edition. Williams began her title defense facing Wild card Jarmila Gajdošová and won easily in straight sets winning both sets in three. She then took on Chinese qualifier Yuan Meng and once again came through it straight, this time dropping only four games. In the third round, she faced Victoria Azarenka, Williams won in straight sets aided by 15 aces she served in the match. In the following round, 12th seed Nicole Vaidišová was in her path in her title defense and once again Williams won in straight sets. In the final 8, Williams faltered against Jelena Janković losing in straight sets, Williams serve broke down as she was broken 7 times in the match. This ended Williams winning streak at the event at 18. This was her fourth straight loss in the quarterfinals of a Grand Slam singles tournament and the first time since the 2001 Wimbledon Championship where she completed a four-in-a-row loss in the quarterfinals of a slam.

Williams also played doubles with Venus Williams, they went into the quarterfinals without dropping a set defeating the teams of Monique Adamczak and Christina Wheeler, Katarina Srebotnik and Ai Sugiyama, and Maret Ani and Meilen Tu. In the quarterfinals they faced the Chinese pair of Yan Zi and Zheng Jie, however they fell in three sets after claiming the first set.

==== Canara Bank Bangalore Open ====
Williams, then played at the Canara Bank Bangalore Open. Williams as the third seed received a bye in the first round. In her opening match against Tzipora Obziler, after scrapping through the first set, Williams bageled Obziler in the second set. In her next match, she took on Russia's Anastasia Rodionova and cruised through dropping only five games. In the semifinals, she took on sister Venus Williams, Serena won the first set breaking Venus twice while getting broken once herself. Venus came back to win the second set. In the decider Serena broke Venus in the seventh game and served for it in the tenth game and had a match point, but Venus came back and had a match point herself at the twelfth game, which Serena saved to push it to a tie-break. Serena came through the tie-break to advance. In the final she took on Swiss Patty Schnyder, In the first set, Williams served for the set at the tenth game with two set points, but got broken, only to break back, and closed out the set in the twelfth game. Williams was then down by a break early in the second, just to win the next five games, serving it out in the ninth game to win the title.

==== Sony Ericsson Open ====
Williams next scheduled event was the Sony Ericsson Open. Being seeded, Williams received a bye into the second round, where she faced Edina Gallovits and won, only dropping three games. In the third round, she took on Italian Flavia Pennetta. The first set went to a tie-break, which the Italian won. Pennetta then won the first three games of the second, Williams then made a comeback winning 12 of the last 1four games to beat the Italian in three. There was a rain delay after the fifth game, Penneta up by a break, which Williams said helped her comeback in the match. Williams overcame 60 unforced errors in the match In the round of 16, Williams faced Estonia's Kaia Kanepi and won easily in straight sets, winning both sets in three. In the final 8, she faced world no. 1 Justine Henin, in a rematch of the previous year's final. The match went on serve for the first four games, before Williams reeled in ten straight games to advance. In the semifinals, Williams took on world no. 4 Svetlana Kuznetsova. Kuznetsova took the first set breaking Williams twice while getting broken once herself. In the second set, Williams broke Kuznetsova in the 11th game and served it out in the following game to go to a decider. Williams then made the decisive break in the 8th game and closed it out in the 9th game to go through. In the final, Williams faced 3rd ranked Jelena Janković, Williams took the first set in a breadstick. In the second set Williams took the first three games and served for the match at the tenth game, but Janković came back and won the last three games to push it to a decider. Williams then won the first five games of the third set, Janković came back, before Williams could close it out in her 8th match point at the 9th game. Williams claims her fifth Miami title, tying her with Steffi Graf for most titles in the tournament.

=== Clay court season and French Open ===
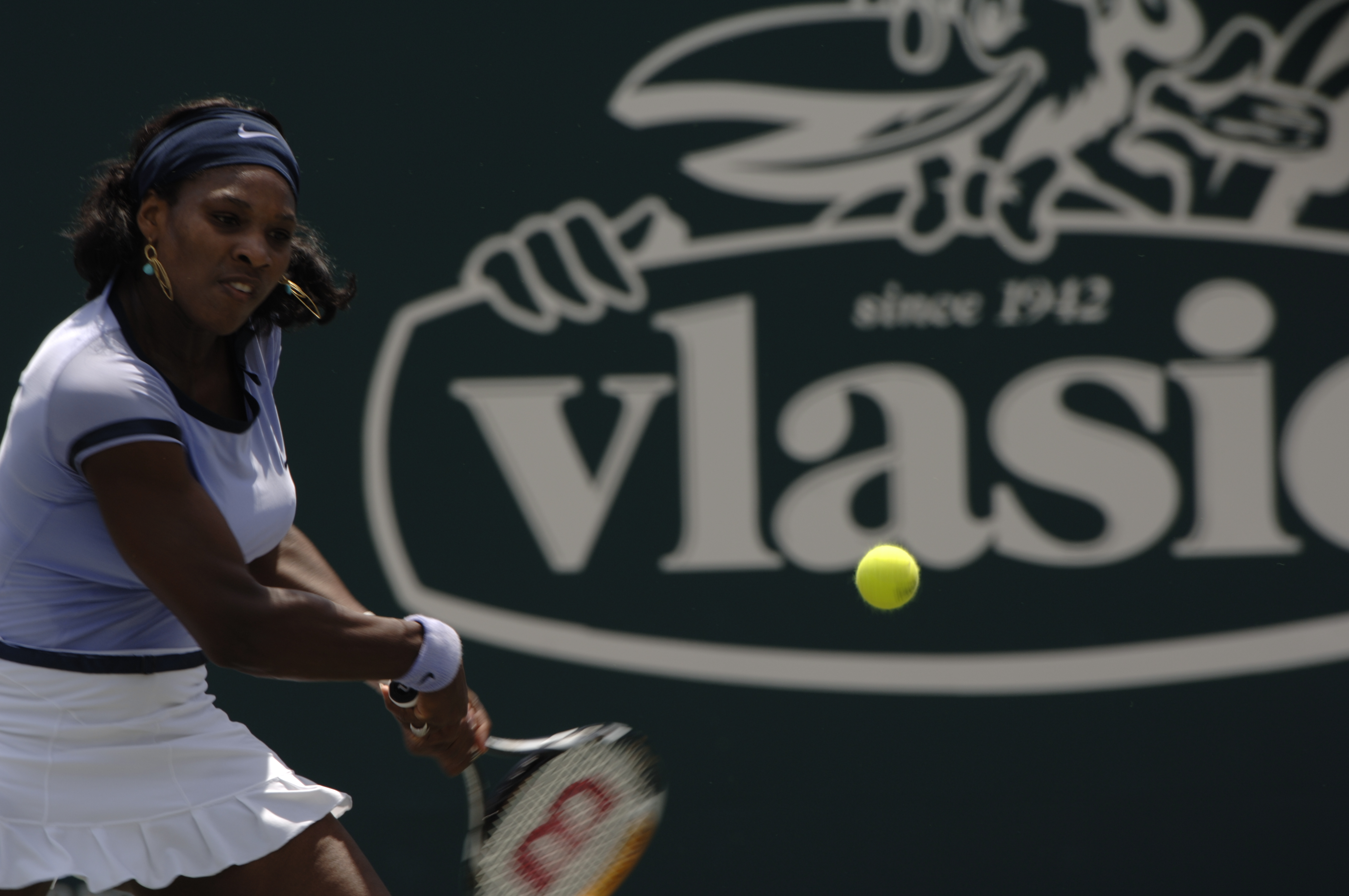
Williams claims her first Charleston title.

==== Family Circle Cup ====
Williams began her clay preparations at Family Circle Cup. As the fifth seed, Williams received a bye in the first round. In the first round she won in straight sets against Frenchwoman Gisela Dulko. In the second round, she took on Katarina Srebotnik and came back winning in three after losing the first set. In the following round, Williams faced second seed Maria Sharapova, Williams won the first set in the twelfth game and then lost the second set with a single break advantage for the Russian. Williams then cruised in the third set dropping only a game. In the final 4, Williams defeated surprise semifinalist Alizé Cornet in straight sets. In the final, Williams faced Russian Vera Zvonareva. Williams took the first set when she broke Zvonareva in the first set and the held proceedings. Zvonareva then came back in the second when she broke in the sixth game with a Williams double fault, Zvonareva took advantage and won the second set to force a decider. In the final set, Williams was broken early, just to broken back. Williams then made the decisive break in the eight game and then serve it out to win her first Charleston title.

==== Qatar Telecom German Open ====
Her next scheduled event was the Qatar Telecom German Open. She received a bye to advance to the second round to face Francesca Schiavone, Williams cruised pass the Italian losing five games in the process. In the following round, she took on Agnieszka Radwańska and cruised, losing only four games. In the quarterfinals, she faced Russian Dinara Safina, Williams took the first set dropping only two games, Safina came back to take the second. The third set then went to decisive tie-break which Safina won. This loss ends Williams 17 match winning streak.

==== Internazionali BNL d'Italia ====
Williams made her final French Open preparation at the Internazionali BNL d'Italia. After receiving a bye in the first round, Williams won easily against Alona Bondarenko losing only two games, winning the second set in a bagel. In the next round, she faced Italian wildcard Sara Errani and won in straight sets with a break advantage in each. Williams was bound to face Alizé Cornet in the quarterfinal, when she withdrew before the match with a back injury.

==== French Open ====
Williams was the fifth-seeded player at the French Open. She was the only former winner of this tournament in this year's draw, following the sudden retirement of four-time champion Justine Henin. Williams began her campaign for a second French Open against compatriot Ashley Harkleroad, who she beat convincingly dropping only three games. In the second round, Williams defeated wild card Mathilde Johansson, cruising through the first set and was pushed to 1two games in the second set. In the round of 32, Williams took on Katarina Srebotnik. Williams was broken early just to break back to go back on serve. Srebotnik took advantage of the error-prone Williams to break and closed it out in the tenth game. In the second set, Williams had break points in three of Srebotnik's service games but failed to break. Srebotnik then won the second in the tenth game to produce the upset.

=== Wimbledon ===
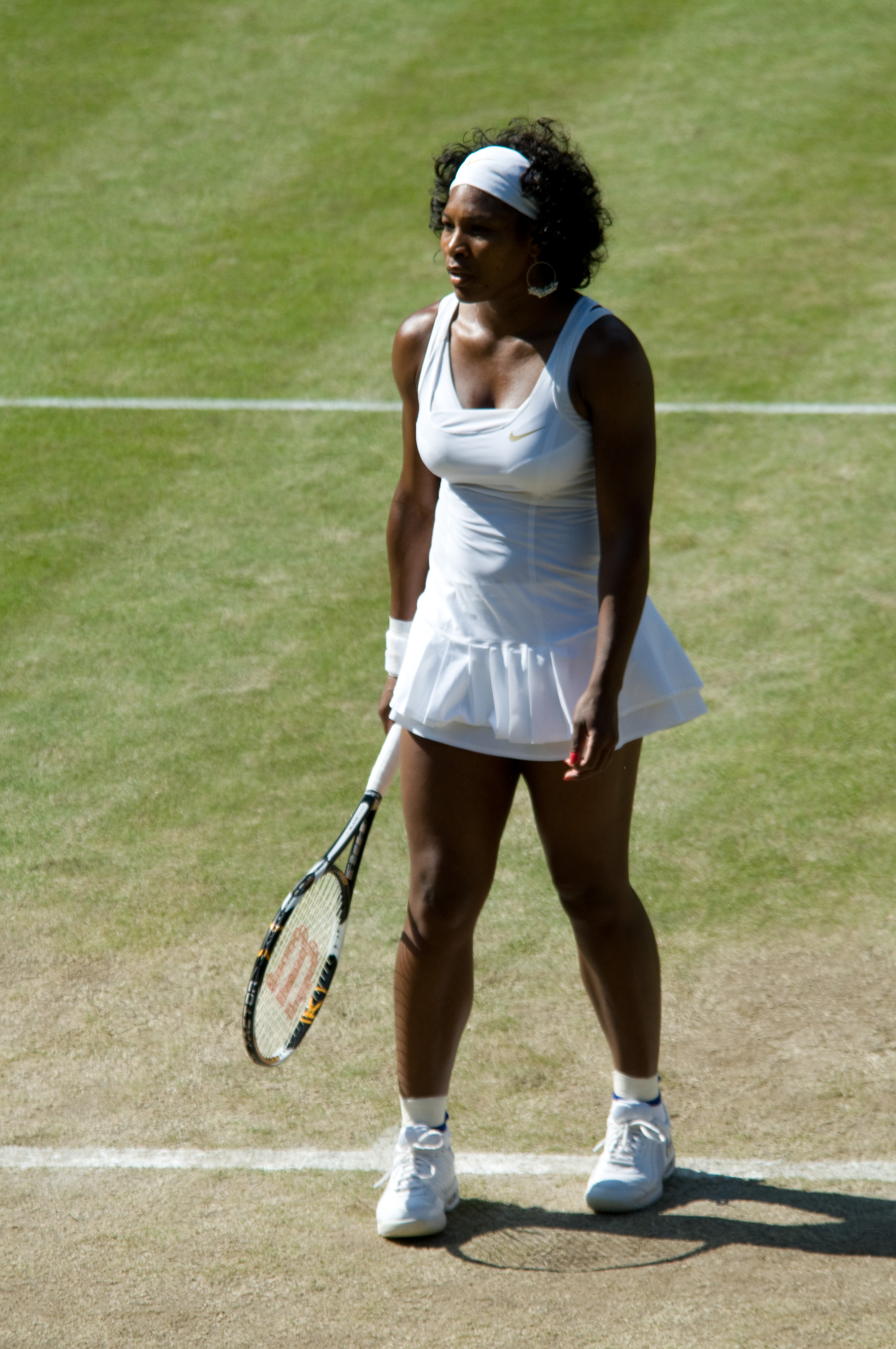
Williams losing to sister Venus in the final and winning the doubles title.

Williams came into the Wimbledon Championships trying to win her third title in the event, having last won the title in 2003. She also was the sixth seed. In her opener she took on French Open quarterfinalist Kaia Kanepi, Kanepi had break points in the eleventh game, but Williams saved them and broke in the next game to take a set lead. Williams then took the second set, closing it out in the ninth game. In her next match, she faced Poland's Urszula Radwańska, Williams took an early two break lead, Radwańska was able to get one back, Williams hold on with the lead and closed the set in the tenth game. In the second set the pair broke each other early, but Williams took another break and sealed the win. In the third round, it was a battle of former no. 1's and former Wimbledon champions, when she took on Amélie Mauresmo. The first set the two went toe-to-toe as both struggled, but Williams outlasted Mauresmo in a tie-break. With Mauresmo struggling with her movement, Williams took advantage winning the second set with a breadstick scoreline. In the round of 16, Williams faced compatriot Bethanie Mattek-Sands, and won easily in straight winning both sets in three. In the final 8, Williams faced her second Radwańska opponent of the tournament in Agnieszka. Williams cruised, losing only four games, winning the second set with a bagel in just 51 minutes. She finished with 11 aces, including 4 in one game in the first set. In all, Williams finished with 27 winners and 6 unforced errors. In the last four, Williams took on surprise semifinalist Zheng Jie, Williams came through in straight with a drop of 8 games, edging Zheng in a second set tie-break. In the final, she faced sister Venus in their 7th slam final match, with Serena leading 5–1. Serena opened up the match breaking Venus, just to see Venus break back in the eight game and twelfth game to take the first set. They then traded breaks in the third and fourth game of the second. Venus then broke Serena in the tenth game to take the title. This was the first Grand Slam final in which the Williams sisters had played each other since 2003.

In the doubles, she and sister Venus cruised through their first four matches with wins over the teams of Tatiana Poutchek and Anastasia Rodionova, Marta Domachowska and Agnieszka Radwańska, Anabel Medina Garrigues and Virginia Ruano Pascual, and Bethanie Mattek-Sands and Sania Mirza, winning all matches in straight sets. In the semifinals, they defeated the France-Australia combination of Nathalie Dechy and Casey Dellacqua in straight sets, both in three. In the final, they faced the team of former no. 1 doubles players Lisa Raymond and Samantha Stosur, but cruised through their 6th slam title dropping only four games, 2 in each set. In the victory the pair did not drop a set all tournament long.

=== Olympics and US Open Series ===
==== Bank of the West Classic ====
Williams made her preparation for the Summer Olympics and US Open at the Bank of the West Classic. Williams received a bye in the first round and faced 15-year-old qualifier Michelle Larcher de Brito. Williams took an early break lead, until Larcher de Brito won six games in a row to take a set and the first two games of the second set. Williams then came back winning 12 of the last 1five games to go through. In the last 8, unlike her opening match, she cruised pass Patty Schnyder in straight sets with a drop of four games. In the semifinal, Williams retired against surprise semifinalist and qualifier Aleksandra Wozniak while trailing by a set and break due to a left knee injury.

==== East West Bank Classic ====
Williams withdrew from the East West Bank Classic due to the same knee injury she retired from the previous tournament.

==== Summer Olympics ====
Williams came into the Summer Olympics, trying to claim her first singles gold. In her opening match she took Belarus' Olga Govortsova and was a set and on serve in the third game when the match was suspended due to rain. In the resumption the next day Williams won the four games to take the in second set in a breadstick and win. In her next match, she faced Australia's Samantha Stosur and made quick work of her opponent winning in just 44 minutes and a loss of two games, winning the second set in a bagel. In her third round match, she was pushed by France's Alizé Cornet, Williams dropped the opening, but came back to win the next two, to advance. In the last 8, Williams took on Russia's Elena Dementieva, Williams took the first set in the ninth game. Dementieva then battled back to take the second in the tenth game. In the final set, the Russian raced through the first five games, winning them all, before Williams could racked in three herself. However, Dementieva was able to close it out in the ninth game.

In the doubles, she and sister Venus Williams was one of the two teams player for the United States. It is their second Olympics as a team, having won in 2000 and missing the 2004 edition. In the first round they faced the Czech pairing of Iveta Benešová and Nicole Vaidišová, the Czech pair took the first set with a single break. The second set was tight but the Williams sisters were able to come through, breaking in the 11th game and holding serve to push it to a decider. The Williams sisters then dominated the last set with a breadstick. In their next two matches, they won in straight sets against the Japan's Ayumi Morita and Ai Sugiyama, and the Russian pairing of Elena Vesnina and Vera Zvonareva. In the semifinals they faced the Australian Open doubles champions Ukraine's Alona Bondarenko and Kateryna Bondarenko. The first set was won by the Bondarenko sisters with an advantage of a single break, the Williams sisters came back with the same scoreline in the second set and then dominated the third with a breadstick. In the battle for the Gold medal the faced Spanish French Open champions Anabel Medina Garrigues and Virginia Ruano Pascual and cruised to their second gold medal with a drop of only two games including a bagel in the first set. This is their second doubles gold and stays undefeated at the Olympics as a pair

==== US Open ====
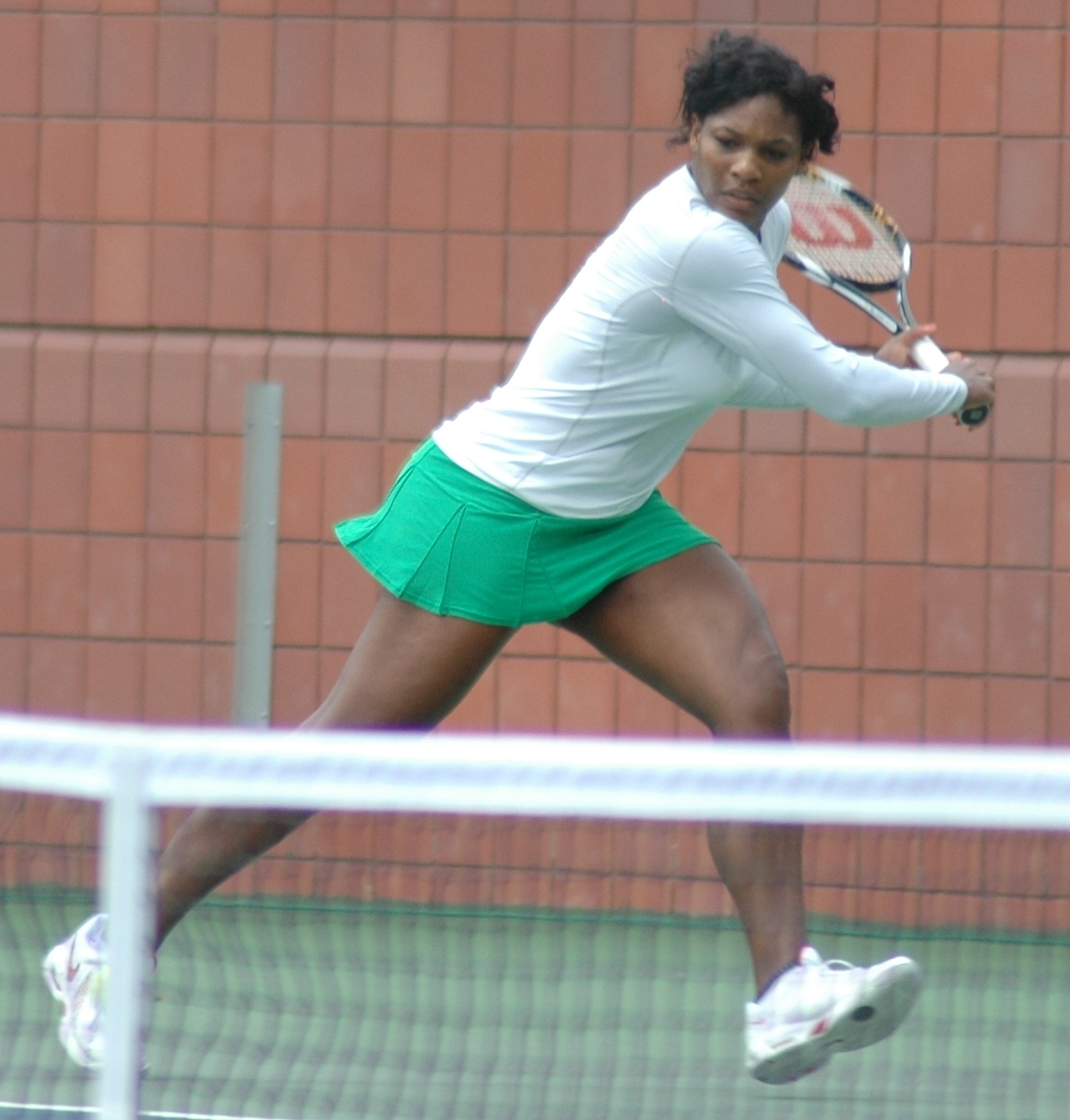
Williams practicing at the US Open.

Williams came into the US Open as the world no. 3, and was one of seven contenders to claim the number 1 ranking. Williams was also trying the title for the first time in six years. Williams began her tournament against Ukraine's Kateryna Bondarenko and cruised in straight set. She recorded six aces and won 92 percent of the points on her first serve. Williams, in her second round match took on Russia's Elena Vesnina and won with a double breadstick victory. In the following round, she faced 30th seed Ai Sugiyama and cruised in a 66 minutes straight sets win. In the fourth round, Williams cruised pass French wild card Séverine Brémond in straight sets winning both sets in two. In the final 8, Williams took on sister Venus Williams in their 17th meeting. In the first set Venus had the advantage serving for the set at the tenth game, however younger sister Serena came back to push it to a tie-break. Venus then had two set points in the tie-break, but Serena reeled in four straight points to win the set. In the second set, once again Venus served for the set in the ninth game and had three set points, just to see Serena save them all and save another one at the twelfth game to push to another tie-break. Venus then had another three set points in the tie-break, just to see Serena win 6 of the last 7 points to win the match. In the semifinals, Williams faced French Open finalist Dinara Safina, Safina took an early lead winning the first two games, just to see Williams come back breaking her in the fourth and eight game and served the set out in the ninth game saving two break points. Williams then cruised in the second set winning it in two. In her first final since 2002, Williams took on Jelena Janković for the title and the number 1 ranking. In the first set, Williams took control with a single break lead. The second set was a turn-around, Janković had her chances she had three set points in the Williams serve in the ninth game and served for the set in the tenth game. However, Williams came back and broke Janković in the tenth and twelfth game to win her third US Open title and ninth slam without dropping a set. Williams finished with 44 winners, offsetting her 39 unforced errors, while Janković had 15 winners and 22 unforced errors. The win also gave Williams the number 1 ranking.

=== Indoors and year-end Championships ===
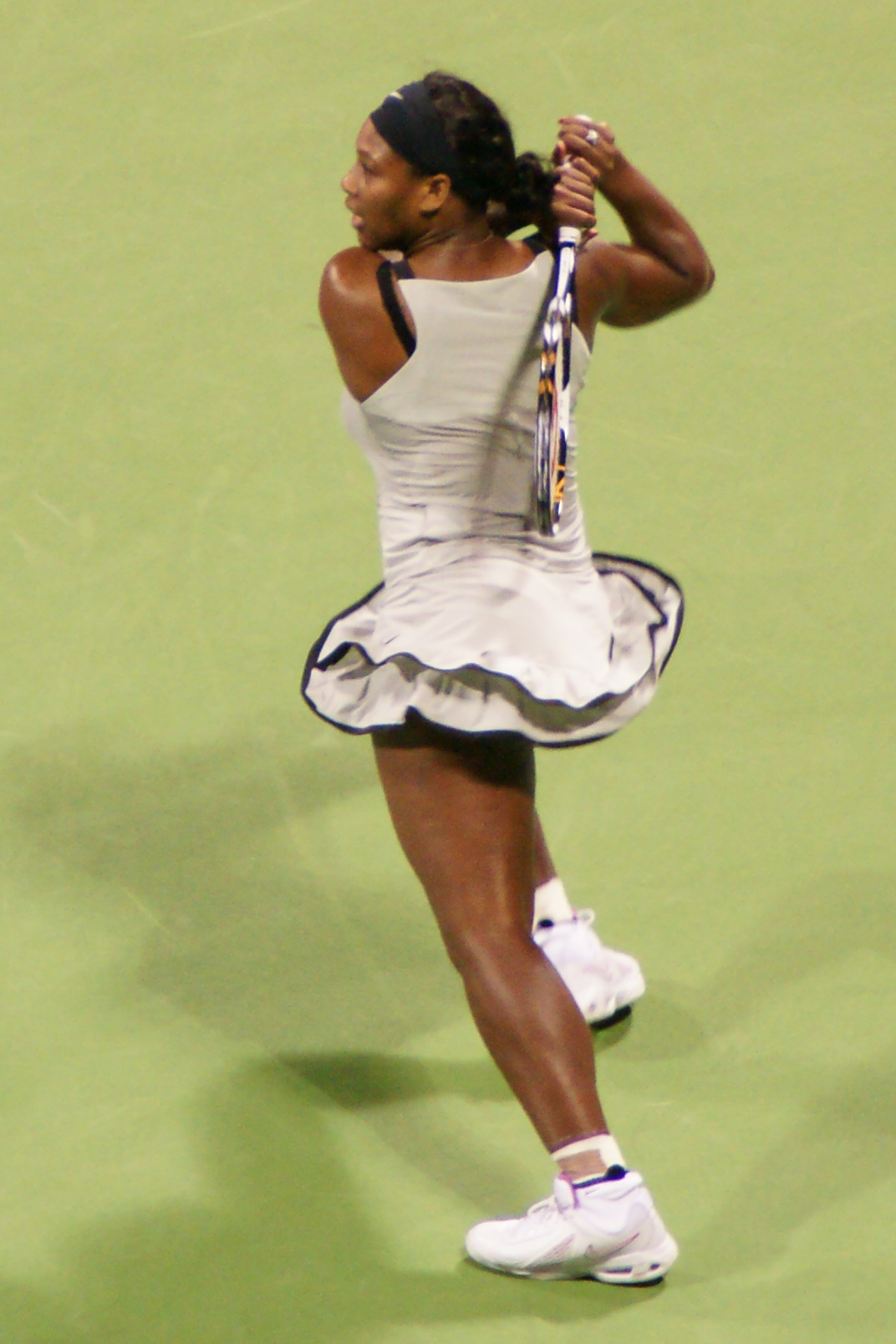
Williams at the WTA Tour championships

==== Porsche Tennis Grand Prix ====
Williams then played the Porsche Tennis Grand Prix as the world no. 1. After receiving a bye in the first round, she faced Li Na. Williams won the first set in a bagel, then lost the second set in a breadstick. The third set went to Li with a single break advantage. The loss meant that Williams will loss her number 1 ranking.

In the doubles, she and sister Venus won in straight sets against Daniela Hantuchová and Ágnes Szávay before withdrawing in their match against Andrea Hlaváčková and Lucie Hradecká because of a left ankle injury to Serena

==== Kremlin Cup ====
Williams then withdrew from the Kremlin Cup citing a continuing left ankle injury and a desire to give her body time to recover from a packed playing schedule.

==== WTA Tour Championships ====
Williams being the third seed was drawn with Dinara Safina, Elena Dementieva, and Venus Williams. Williams played Safina first and won comfortably in straight sets. In her second round robin match, she took on sister Venus, Serena took the first set in the twelfth game. However, from then on Serena only won a game losing the next to in a breadstick and a bagel. Handing the first bagel in the Williams sisters rivalry. Williams then pulled out with a stomach injury before her match against Dementieva and was replaced by Nadia Petrova.

== All matches ==
=== Singles matches ===
Tournament	Match	Round	Opponent	Rank	Result	Score
Australian Open; Melbourne, Australia; Grand Slam; Hard, outdoor 14–27 January 2008	433	1R	(Australia) Jarmila Gajdošová	#145	Win	6–3, 6–3
Australian Open; Melbourne, Australia; Grand Slam; Hard, outdoor 14–27 January 2008	434	2R	(China) Yuan Meng	#121	Win	6–3, 6–1
Australian Open; Melbourne, Australia; Grand Slam; Hard, outdoor 14–27 January 2008	435	3R	(Belarus) Victoria Azarenka	#24	Win	6–3, 6–4
Australian Open; Melbourne, Australia; Grand Slam; Hard, outdoor 14–27 January 2008	436	4R	(Czech Republic) Nicole Vaidišová	#12	Win	6–3, 6–4
Australian Open; Melbourne, Australia; Grand Slam; Hard, outdoor 14–27 January 2008	437	QF	(Serbia) Jelena Janković	#4	Loss	3–6, 4–6
Canara Bank Bangalore Open; Bangalore, India; WTA Tier II; Hard; 3–9 March 2008	–	1R	Bye			
Canara Bank Bangalore Open; Bangalore, India; WTA Tier II; Hard; 3–9 March 2008	438	2R	(Israel) Tzipora Obziler	#117	Win	7–5, 6–0
Canara Bank Bangalore Open; Bangalore, India; WTA Tier II; Hard; 3–9 March 2008	439	QF	(Russia) Anastasia Rodionova	#86	Win	6–1, 6–4
Canara Bank Bangalore Open; Bangalore, India; WTA Tier II; Hard; 3–9 March 2008	440	SF	(United States) Venus Williams	#7	Win	6–3, 3–6, 7–6^{(7-4)}
Canara Bank Bangalore Open; Bangalore, India; WTA Tier II; Hard; 3–9 March 2008	441	F	(Switzerland) Patty Schnyder	#12	Win	7–5, 6–3
Sony Ericsson Open; Key Biscayne, Miami, USA; WTA Tier I Hard; 24 March - 6 April 2008	–	1R	Bye			
Sony Ericsson Open; Key Biscayne, Miami, USA; WTA Tier I Hard; 24 March - 6 April 2008	442	2R	(Romania) Edina Gallovits	#62	Win	6–1, 6–2
Sony Ericsson Open; Key Biscayne, Miami, USA; WTA Tier I Hard; 24 March - 6 April 2008	443	3R	(Italy) Flavia Pennetta	#34	Win	6–7^{(8–10)}, 6–2, 6–3
Sony Ericsson Open; Key Biscayne, Miami, USA; WTA Tier I Hard; 24 March - 6 April 2008	444	4R	(Estonia) Kaia Kanepi	#61	Win	6–3, 6–3
Sony Ericsson Open; Key Biscayne, Miami, USA; WTA Tier I Hard; 24 March - 6 April 2008	445	QF	(Belgium) Justine Henin	#1	Win	6–2, 6–0
Sony Ericsson Open; Key Biscayne, Miami, USA; WTA Tier I Hard; 24 March - 6 April 2008	446	SF	(Russia) Svetlana Kuznetsova	#4	Win	3–6, 7–5, 6–3
Sony Ericsson Open; Key Biscayne, Miami, USA; WTA Tier I Hard; 24 March - 6 April 2008	447	F	(Serbia) Jelena Janković	#3	Win	6–1, 5–7, 6–3
Family Circle Cup; Charleston, USA; WTA Tier I Clay, Green; 14–20 April 2008	–	1R	Bye			
Family Circle Cup; Charleston, USA; WTA Tier I Clay, Green; 14–20 April 2008	448	2R	(Argentina) Gisela Dulko	#48	Win	6–3, 6–4
Family Circle Cup; Charleston, USA; WTA Tier I Clay, Green; 14–20 April 2008	449	3R	(Slovenia) Katarina Srebotnik	#31	Win	4–6, 6–4, 6–3
Family Circle Cup; Charleston, USA; WTA Tier I Clay, Green; 14–20 April 2008	450	QF	(Russia) Maria Sharapova	#4	Win	7–5, 4–6, 6–1
Family Circle Cup; Charleston, USA; WTA Tier I Clay, Green; 14–20 April 2008	451	SF	(France) Alizé Cornet	#40	Win	7–5, 6–3
Family Circle Cup; Charleston, USA; WTA Tier I Clay, Green; 14–20 April 2008	452	F	(Russia) Vera Zvonareva	#17	Win	6–4, 3–6, 6–3
Qatar Telecom German Open; Berlin, Germany; WTA Tier I Clay, Red; 5–11 May 2008	–	1R	Bye			
Qatar Telecom German Open; Berlin, Germany; WTA Tier I Clay, Red; 5–11 May 2008	453	2R	(Italy) Francesca Schiavone	#24	Win	6–2, 6–3
Qatar Telecom German Open; Berlin, Germany; WTA Tier I Clay, Red; 5–11 May 2008	454	3R	(Poland) Agnieszka Radwańska	#15	Win	6–3, 6–1
Qatar Telecom German Open; Berlin, Germany; WTA Tier I Clay, Red; 5–11 May 2008	455	QF	(Russia) Dinara Safina	#17	Loss	6–2, 1–6, 6–7^{(5–7)}
Internazionali BNL d'Italia; Rome, Italy; WTA Tier I Clay, Red; 12–18 May 2008	–	1R	Bye			
Internazionali BNL d'Italia; Rome, Italy; WTA Tier I Clay, Red; 12–18 May 2008	456	2R	(Ukraine) Alona Bondarenko	#24	Win	6–2, 6–0
Internazionali BNL d'Italia; Rome, Italy; WTA Tier I Clay, Red; 12–18 May 2008	457	3R	(Italy) Sara Errani	#60	Win	6–4, 6–3
Internazionali BNL d'Italia; Rome, Italy; WTA Tier I Clay, Red; 12–18 May 2008	–	QF	(France) Alizé Cornet	#34	Withdrew	N/A
French Open; Paris, France; Grand Slam; Clay, Red; 26 May - 8 June 2008	458	1R	(United States) Ashley Harkleroad	#61	Win	6–2, 6–1
French Open; Paris, France; Grand Slam; Clay, Red; 26 May - 8 June 2008	459	2R	(France) Mathilde Johansson	#129	Win	6–2, 7–5
French Open; Paris, France; Grand Slam; Clay, Red; 26 May - 8 June 2008	460	3R	(Slovenia) Katarina Srebotnik	#24	Loss	4–6, 4–6
Wimbledon; London, United Kingdom; Grand Slam; Grass; 23 June - 6 July 2008	461	1R	(Estonia) Kaia Kanepi	#36	Win	7–5, 6–3
Wimbledon; London, United Kingdom; Grand Slam; Grass; 23 June - 6 July 2008	462	2R	(Poland) Urszula Radwańska	#190	Win	6–4, 6–4
Wimbledon; London, United Kingdom; Grand Slam; Grass; 23 June - 6 July 2008	463	3R	(France) Amélie Mauresmo	#33	Win	7–6^{(7–5)}, 6–1
Wimbledon; London, United Kingdom; Grand Slam; Grass; 23 June - 6 July 2008	464	4R	(United States) Bethanie Mattek-Sands	#69	Win	6–3, 6–3
Wimbledon; London, United Kingdom; Grand Slam; Grass; 23 June - 6 July 2008	465	QF	(Poland) Agnieszka Radwańska	#11	Win	6–4, 6–0
Wimbledon; London, United Kingdom; Grand Slam; Grass; 23 June - 6 July 2008	466	SF	(China) Zheng Jie	#133	Win	6–2, 7–6^{(7–5)}
Wimbledon; London, United Kingdom; Grand Slam; Grass; 23 June - 6 July 2008	467	F	(United States) Venus Williams	#7	Loss	5–7, 4–6
Bank of the West Classic; Stanford, United States; WTA Tier II; Hard, outdoor 14–20 July 2008	–	1R	Bye			
Bank of the West Classic; Stanford, United States; WTA Tier II; Hard, outdoor 14–20 July 2008	468	2R	(Portugal) Michelle Larcher de Brito	#226	Win	4–6, 6–3, 6–2
Bank of the West Classic; Stanford, United States; WTA Tier II; Hard, outdoor 14–20 July 2008	469	QF	(Switzerland) Patty Schnyder	#13	Win	6–3, 6–1
Bank of the West Classic; Stanford, United States; WTA Tier II; Hard, outdoor 14–20 July 2008	470	SF	(Canada) Aleksandra Wozniak	#85	Loss	2–6, 1–3 ret
Summer Olympics; Beijing, China; Olympic Games; Hard, outdoor 10 – 17 August 2008	471	1R	(Belarus) Olga Govortsova	#48	Win	6–3, 6–1
Summer Olympics; Beijing, China; Olympic Games; Hard, outdoor 10 – 17 August 2008	472	2R	(Australia) Samantha Stosur	#79	Win	6–2, 6–0
Summer Olympics; Beijing, China; Olympic Games; Hard, outdoor 10 – 17 August 2008	473	3R	(France) Alizé Cornet	#18	Win	3–6, 6–3, 6–4
Summer Olympics; Beijing, China; Olympic Games; Hard, outdoor 10 – 17 August 2008	474	QF	(Russia) Elena Dementieva	#7	Loss	6–3, 4–6, 3–6
US Open; New York City, United States; Grand Slam; Hard, outdoor 25 August - 7 September 2008	475	1R	(Ukraine) Kateryna Bondarenko	#46	Win	6–1, 6–4
US Open; New York City, United States; Grand Slam; Hard, outdoor 25 August - 7 September 2008	476	2R	(Russia) Elena Vesnina	#71	Win	6–1, 6–1
US Open; New York City, United States; Grand Slam; Hard, outdoor 25 August - 7 September 2008	477	3R	(Japan) Ai Sugiyama	#31	Win	6–2, 6–1
US Open; New York City, United States; Grand Slam; Hard, outdoor 25 August - 7 September 2008	478	4R	(France) Séverine Brémond	#121	Win	6–2, 6–2
US Open; New York City, United States; Grand Slam; Hard, outdoor 25 August - 7 September 2008	479	QF	(United States) Venus Williams	#8	Win	7–6^{(8–6)}, 7–6^{(9–7)}
US Open; New York City, United States; Grand Slam; Hard, outdoor 25 August - 7 September 2008	480	SF	(Russia) Dinara Safina	#7	Win	6–3, 6–2
US Open; New York City, United States; Grand Slam; Hard, outdoor 25 August - 7 September 2008	481	F	(Serbia) Jelena Janković	#2	Win	6–4, 7–5
Porsche Tennis Grand Prix; Stuttgart, Germany; WTA Tier II; Hard, indoors 29 September - 5 October 2008	–	1R	Bye			
Porsche Tennis Grand Prix; Stuttgart, Germany; WTA Tier II; Hard, indoors 29 September - 5 October 2008	482	2R	(China) Li Na	#30	Loss	6–0, 1–6, 4–6
WTA Tour Championships; Doha, Qatar; Year-End Championship; Hard, indoor 4–10 November 2008	483	RR	(Russia) Dinara Safina	#2	Win	6–4, 6–1
WTA Tour Championships; Doha, Qatar; Year-End Championship; Hard, indoor 4–10 November 2008	484	RR	(United States) Venus Williams	#8	Loss	7–5, 1–6, 0–6

=== Doubles matches ===
Tournament	Match	Round	Partner	Opponents	Rank	Result	Score
Australian Open; Melbourne, Australia; Grand Slam; Hard, outdoor 14–27 January 2008	111	1R	(United States) Venus Williams	(Australia) Monique Adamczak (Australia) Christina Wheeler	#158 #169	Win	7–5, 6–1
Australian Open; Melbourne, Australia; Grand Slam; Hard, outdoor 14–27 January 2008	112	2R	(United States) Venus Williams	(Slovenia) Katarina Srebotnik (Japan) Ai Sugiyama	#4 #6	Win	6–2, 7–6^{(7–2)}
Australian Open; Melbourne, Australia; Grand Slam; Hard, outdoor 14–27 January 2008	113	3R	(United States) Venus Williams	(Estonia) Maret Ani (United States) Meilen Tu	#127 #32	Win	6–4, 6–1
Australian Open; Melbourne, Australia; Grand Slam; Hard, outdoor 14–27 January 2008	114	QF	(United States) Venus Williams	(China) Yan Zi (China) Zheng Jie	#31 #29	Loss	6–3, 4–6, 2–6
Canara Bank Bangalore Open; Bangalore, India; WTA Tier II; Hard; 3–9 March 2008	115	1R	(United States) Venus Williams	(Romania) Andreea Ehritt-Vanc (Thailand) Tamarine Tanasugarn	#84 #67	Win	7–6^{(7–5)}, 6–4
Canara Bank Bangalore Open; Bangalore, India; WTA Tier II; Hard; 3–9 March 2008	116	QF	(United States) Venus Williams	(China) Peng Shuai (China) Sun Tiantian	#27 #25	Loss	6–5, 2–6, [9–11]
Wimbledon; London, United Kingdom; Grand Slam; Grass; 21 June - 4 July 2008	117	1R	(United States) Venus Williams	(Belarus) Tatiana Poutchek (Russia) Anastasia Rodionova	#32 #45	Win	6–0, 6–3
Wimbledon; London, United Kingdom; Grand Slam; Grass; 21 June - 4 July 2008	118	2R	(United States) Venus Williams	(Poland) Marta Domachowska (Poland) Agnieszka Radwańska	#216 #48	Win	6–0, 6–4
Wimbledon; London, United Kingdom; Grand Slam; Grass; 21 June - 4 July 2008	119	3R	(United States) Venus Williams	(Spain) Anabel Medina Garrigues (Spain) Virginia Ruano Pascual	#11 #12	Win	6–1, 6–4
Wimbledon; London, United Kingdom; Grand Slam; Grass; 21 June - 4 July 2008	120	QF	(United States) Venus Williams	(United States) Bethanie Mattek-Sands (India) Sania Mirza	#24 #19	Win	6–4, 6–3
Wimbledon; London, United Kingdom; Grand Slam; Grass; 21 June - 4 July 2008	121	SF	(United States) Venus Williams	(France) Nathalie Dechy (Australia) Casey Dellacqua	#21 #35	Win	6–3, 6–3
Wimbledon; London, United Kingdom; Grand Slam; Grass; 21 June - 4 July 2008	122	F	(United States) Venus Williams	(United States) Lisa Raymond (Australia) Samantha Stosur	#25 #47	Win	6–2, 6–2
Summer Olympics; Beijing, China; Olympic Games; Hard, outdoor 10 – 17 August 2008	123	1R	(United States) Venus Williams	(Czech Republic) Iveta Benešová (Czech Republic) Nicole Vaidišová	#23 #235	Win	4–6, 7–5, 6–1
Summer Olympics; Beijing, China; Olympic Games; Hard, outdoor 10 – 17 August 2008	124	2R	(United States) Venus Williams	(Japan) Ayumi Morita (Japan) Ai Sugiyama	#74 #4	Win	7–5, 6–2
Summer Olympics; Beijing, China; Olympic Games; Hard, outdoor 10 – 17 August 2008	125	QF	(United States) Venus Williams	(Russia) Elena Vesnina (Russia) Vera Zvonareva	#21 #40	Win	6–4, 6–0
Summer Olympics; Beijing, China; Olympic Games; Hard, outdoor 10 – 17 August 2008	126	SF	(United States) Venus Williams	(Ukraine) Alona Bondarenko (Ukraine) Kateryna Bondarenko	#14 #13	Win	4–6, 6–4, 6–1
Summer Olympics; Beijing, China; Olympic Games; Hard, outdoor 10 – 17 August 2008	127	G	(United States) Venus Williams	(Spain) Anabel Medina Garrigues (Spain) Virginia Ruano Pascual	#12 #11	Win	6–2, 6–0
Porsche Tennis Grand Prix; Stuttgart, Germany; WTA Tier II; Hard, indoors 29 September - 5 October 2008	128	1R	(United States) Venus Williams	(Slovakia) Daniela Hantuchová (Hungary) Ágnes Szávay	#45 #58	Win	6–4, 6–1
Porsche Tennis Grand Prix; Stuttgart, Germany; WTA Tier II; Hard, indoors 29 September - 5 October 2008	–	QF	(United States) Venus Williams	(Czech Republic) Andrea Hlaváčková (Czech Republic) Lucie Hradecká	#96 #60	Withdrew	N/A

=== Hopman Cup Matches ===
Tournament	Round	Partner	Match	Opponents	Result	Score
Hopman Cup; Perth, Western Australia, Australia; Mixed Exhibition; Hard, indoor 29 December - 4 January 2008
Hopman Cup; Perth, Western Australia, Australia; Mixed Exhibition; Hard, indoor 29 December - 4 January 2008	RR	(United States) Mardy Fish	Singles	(Czech Republic) Lucie Šafářová	Win	6–0, 2–6, 7–5
Hopman Cup; Perth, Western Australia, Australia; Mixed Exhibition; Hard, indoor 29 December - 4 January 2008	RR	(United States) Mardy Fish	Doubles	(Czech Republic) Lucie Šafářová (Czech Republic) Tomáš Berdych	Win	6–0 Ret
Hopman Cup; Perth, Western Australia, Australia; Mixed Exhibition; Hard, indoor 29 December - 4 January 2008	RR	(United States) Mardy Fish	Singles	(Australia) Alicia Molik	Win	6–2, 7–6^{(10–8)}
Hopman Cup; Perth, Western Australia, Australia; Mixed Exhibition; Hard, indoor 29 December - 4 January 2008	RR	(United States) Mardy Fish	Doubles	(Australia) Alicia Molik (Australia) Peter Luczak	Win	6–2, 6–3
Hopman Cup; Perth, Western Australia, Australia; Mixed Exhibition; Hard, indoor 29 December - 4 January 2008	F	(United States) Mardy Fish	Singles	(Serbia) Jelena Janković	Win	Walkover
Hopman Cup; Perth, Western Australia, Australia; Mixed Exhibition; Hard, indoor 29 December - 4 January 2008	F	(United States) Mardy Fish	Doubles	(Serbia) Jelena Janković (Serbia) Novak Djokovic	Win	7–6^{(7–5)}, 6–2

== Tournament schedule ==
=== Singles schedule ===
Williams' 2008 singles tournament schedule is as follows:

Date	Championship	Location	Category	Surface	Points	Outcome
14 January 2008 – 27 January 2008	Australian Open	Melbourne (AUS)	Grand Slam	Hard	250	Quarterfinals lost to Jelena Janković, 3–6, 4–6
3 March 2008 – 9 March 2008	Canara Bank Bangalore Open	Bangalore (IND)	WTA Tier II	Hard	275	Winner defeated Patty Schnyder, 7–5, 6–3
24 March 2008 – 6 April 2008	Sony Ericsson Open	Miami (USA)	WTA Tier I	Hard	500	Winner defeated Jelena Janković, 6–1, 5–7, 6–3
14 April 2008 – 20 April 2008	Family Circle Cup	Charleston (USA)	WTA Tier I	Clay (green)	430	Winner defeated Vera Zvonareva, 6–4, 3–6, 6–3
5 May 2008 – 11 May 2008	Qatar Telecom German Open	Berlin (GER)	WTA Tier I	Clay, Red	110	Quarterfinals lost to Dinara Safina, 6–2, 1–6, 6–7^{(5–7)}
12 May 2008 – 18 May 2008	Internazionali BNL d'Italia	Rome (ITA)	WTA Tier I	Clay, Red	110	Quarterfinals withdrew before match against Alizé Cornet
26 May 2008 – 8 June 2008	French Open	Paris (FRA)	Grand Slam	Clay	90	Third round lost to Katarina Srebotnik, 4–6, 4–6
23 June 2008 – 6 July 2008	The Championships, Wimbledon	Wimbledon (GBR)	Grand Slam	Grass	700	Final lost to Venus Williams, 5–7, 4–6
14 July 2008 – 20 July 2008	Bank of the West Classic	Stanfored (USA)	WTA Tier II	Hard	125	Semifinals lost to Aleksandra Wozniak 6–2, 3–1, Ret
10 August 2008 – 17 August 2008	2008 Summer Olympics	Beijing (CHN)	Olympic Games	Hard	90	Quarterfinals lost to Elena Dementieva, 6–3, 4–6, 3–6
25 August 2008 – 7 September 2008	US Open	New York (USA)	Grand Slam	Hard	1000	Winner defeated Jelena Janković, 6–4, 7–5
29 September 2008 – 5 October 2008	Porsche Tennis Grand Prix	Stuttgart (GER)	WTA Tier I	Hard (i)	1	Second round lost to Li Na, 6–0, 1–6, 4–6
4 November 2008 – 10 November 2008	WTA Tour Championships	Doha (QTR)	Year End Championships	Hard (i)	185	Round Robin withdrew due to a stomach injury
Total year-end points					3866	

=== Doubles schedule ===
Williams' 2008 doubles tournament schedule is as follows:

Date	Championship	Location	Category	Partner	Surface	Points	Outcome
14 January 2008 – 27 January 2008	Australian Open	Melbourne (AUS)	Grand Slam	(United States) Venus Williams	Hard	250	Quarterfinals lost to Zi/Zheng, 6–3, 4–6, 2–6
3 March 2008 – 9 March 2008	Canara Bank Bangalore Open	Bangalore (IND)	WTA Tier II	(United States) Venus Williams	Hard	70	Quarterfinals lost to Peng/Sun, 7–5, 2–6, [9–11]
23 June 2008 – 6 July 2008	The Championships, Wimbledon	Wimbledon (GBR)	Grand Slam	(United States) Venus Williams	Grass	1000	Winner defeated Raymond/Stosur, 6–2, 6–2
10 August 2008 – 17 August 2008	2008 Summer Olympics	Beijing (CHN)	Olympic Games	(United States) Venus Williams	Hard	0	Gold Medal defeated Medina Garrigues/Ruano Pascual, 6–2, 6–0
29 September 2008 – 5 October 2008	Porsche Tennis Grand Prix	Stuttgart (GER)	WTA Tier I	(United States) Venus Williams	Hard (i)	1	Quarterfinals withdrew before match against Hlaváčková/Hradecká
Total year-end points						1395	

== Yearly records ==
=== Head-to-head matchups ===
Ordered by percentage of wins

- (France) Alizé Cornet 2–0
- (Switzerland) Patty Schnyder 2–0
- (Poland) Agnieszka Radwańska 2–0
- (Estonia) Kaia Kanepi 2–0
- (Australia) Jarmila Gajdošová 1–0
- (China) Yuan Meng 1–0
- (Belarus) Victoria Azarenka 1–0
- (Czech Republic) Nicole Vaidišová 1–0
- (Israel) Tzipora Obziler 1–0
- (Russia) Anastasia Rodionova 1–0
- (Romania) Edina Gallovits 1–0
- (Italy) Flavia Pennetta 1–0
- (Belgium) Justine Henin 1–0
- (Russia) Svetlana Kuznetsova 1–0
- (Argentina) Gisela Dulko 1–0
- (Russia) Maria Sharapova 1–0
- (Russia) Vera Zvonareva 1–0
- (Italy) Francesca Schiavone 1–0
- (Ukraine) Alona Bondarenko 1–0
- (Italy) Sara Errani 1–0
- (United States) Ashley Harkleroad 1–0
- (France) Mathilde Johansson 1–0
- (Poland) Urszula Radwańska 1–0
- (France) Amélie Mauresmo 1–0
- (United States) Bethanie Mattek-Sands 1–0
- (China) Zheng Jie 1–0
- (Portugal) Michelle Larcher de Brito 1–0
- (Belarus) Olga Govortsova 1–0
- (Australia) Samantha Stosur 1–0
- (Ukraine) Kateryna Bondarenko 1–0
- (Russia) Elena Vesnina 1–0
- (Japan) Ai Sugiyama 1–0
- (France) Séverine Brémond 1–0
- (Russia) Dinara Safina 2–1
- (Serbia) Jelena Janković 2–1
- (Slovenia) Katarina Srebotnik 1–1
- (United States) Venus Williams 2–2
- (Russia) Elena Dementieva 0–1
- (China) Li Na 0–1
- (Canada) Aleksandra Wozniak 0–1

=== Finals ===
==== Singles: 5 (4–1) ====
Legend Grand Slam (1–1) WTA Tier I (2–0) WTA Tier II (1–0)	Finals by surface Hard (3–0) Clay (1–0) Grass (0–1)	Finals by venue Outdoors (4–1)

Outcome	No.	Date	Championship	Surface	Opponent in the final	Score in the final
Winner	29.	March 9, 2008	Bangalore, India (1)	Hard	(Switzerland) Patty Schnyder	7–5, 6–3
Winner	30.	April 5, 2008	Miami, US (5)	Hard	(Serbia) Jelena Janković	6–1, 5–7, 6–3
Winner	31.	April 20, 2008	Charleston, US (1)	Clay (green)	(Russia) Vera Zvonareva	6–4, 3–6, 6–3
Runner-up	12.	July 5, 2008	Wimbledon, London, UK (2)	Grass	(United States) Venus Williams	5–7, 4–6
Winner	32.	September 7, 2008	US Open, New York City, US (3)	Hard	(Serbia) Jelena Janković	6–4, 7–5

==== Doubles: 4 (4–0) ====
Legend Grand Slam (1–0) Olympics (1–0)	Finals by surface Hard (2–0)	Finals by venue Outdoors (2–0)

Outcome	No.	Date	Championship	Surface	Partner	Opponent in the final	Score in the final
Winner	12.	July 5, 2008	Wimbledon, London, UK (3)	Grass	(United States) Venus Williams	(United States) Lisa Raymond (Australia) Samantha Stosur	6–2, 6–2
Winner	13.	August 17, 2008	Summer Olympics, Beijing, China (2)	Hard	(United States) Venus Williams	(Spain) Anabel Medina Garrigues (Spain) Virginia Ruano Pascual	6–2, 6–0

=== Earnings ===
#	Event	Prize money	Year-to-date
1	Australian Open	$143,135	$143,135
1	Australian Open (doubles)	$23,153	$166,288
2	Canara Bank Bangalore Open	$95,500	$261,788
2	Canara Bank Bangalore Open (doubles)	$2,305	$264,093
3	Sony Ericsson Open	$590,000	$854,093
4	Family Circle Cup	$196,900	$1,050,993
5	Qatar Telecom German Open	$26,050	$1,077,043
6	Internazionali BNL d'Italia	$25,650	$1,102,693
7	French Open	$54,773	$1,157,466
8	Wimbledon	$750,645	$1,908,111
8	Wimbledon (doubles)	$230,201	$2,138,312
9	Bank of the West Classic	$27,300	$2,165,612
10	2008 Summer Olympics	$0	$2,165,612
10	2008 Summer Olympics (doubles)	$0	$2,165,612
11	US Open	$1,475,936	$3,641,548
12	Porsche Tennis Grand Prix	$8,230	$3,649,778
12	Porsche Tennis Grand Prix (doubles)	$2,395	$3,652,173
13	WTA Tour Championships	$1,550,000	$3,852,173
			$3,852,173

Figures in United States dollars (USD) unless noted.

== See also ==
- 2008 Maria Sharapova tennis season
- 2008 WTA Tour

Sporting positions
Preceded by Venus Williams; Angelique Kerber	World No. 1 First stint: July 8, 2002 – August 10, 2003; Last stint: April 24, 2017 – May 14, 2017	Succeeded by Kim Clijsters; Angelique Kerber
Preceded by Jennifer Capriati; Justine Henin; Petra Kvitová	Year-end World No. 1; 2002; 2008, 2009; 2012 – 2015	Succeeded by Justine Henin; Kim Clijsters; Angelique Kerber
Awards
Preceded by Jennifer Capriati; Jelena Janković; Petra Kvitová	ITF Women's Singles World Champion; 2002; 2009; 2012 – 2015	Succeeded by Justine Henin; Caroline Wozniacki; Angelique Kerber
Preceded by Martina Hingis & Anna Kournikova; Cara Black & Liezel Huber	WTA Doubles Team of the Year; 2000 (with Venus Williams); 2009 (with Venus Williams)	Succeeded by Lisa Raymond & Rennae Stubbs; Gisela Dulko & Flavia Pennetta
Preceded by Cara Black & Liezel Huber	ITF Women's Doubles World Champion; 2009 (with Venus Williams)	Succeeded by Gisela Dulko & Flavia Pennetta
