= 2008 Qatar Telecom German Open – Doubles =

Doubles
- 2008 Qatar Telecom German Open

Final
- Champions: (Zimbabwe) Cara Black (United States) Liezel Huber
- Runners-up: (Spain) Nuria Llagostera Vives (Spain) María José Martínez Sánchez
- Score: 6–2, 6–2

Details
- Draw: 28 (2WC/1Alt)
- Seeds: 8

Events
Singles	Doubles
- German Open

The reigning champions Lisa Raymond and Samantha Stosur did not defend their title.

Cara Black and Liezel Huber won the tournament, by defeating Nuria Llagostera Vives and María José Martínez Sánchez in the final.

== Seeds ==
The top 4 seeds received a bye into the second round.

1. (Zimbabwe) Cara Black / (United States) Liezel Huber (champions)
2. (Czech Republic) Květa Peschke / (Australia) Rennae Stubbs (semifinals)
3. (Chinese Taipei) Chan Yung-jan / (Chinese Taipei) Chuang Chia-jung (second round)
4. (Belarus) Victoria Azarenka / (Israel) Shahar Pe'er (semifinals)
5. (Ukraine) Alona Bondarenko / (Ukraine) Kateryna Bondarenko (quarterfinals)
6. (Russia) Dinara Safina / (Russia) Elena Vesnina (quarterfinals)
7. (China) Yan Zi / (China) Zheng Jie (first round)
8. (Spain) Anabel Medina Garrigues / (Spain) Virginia Ruano Pascual (first round)

== Draw ==
=== Key ===
- WC = Wild card
- r = Retired
- w/o = Walkover

=== Finals ===
Semifinals
1	(Zimbabwe) Cara Black (United States) Liezel Huber	3
4	(Belarus) Victoria Azarenka (Israel) Shahar Pe'er	0^{r}
(Spain) Nuria Llagostera Vives (Spain) María José Martínez Sánchez	6	3	[16]
2	(Czech Republic) Květa Peschke (Australia) Rennae Stubbs	2	6	[14]

Final
1	(Zimbabwe) Cara Black (United States) Liezel Huber	3	6	[10]
(Spain) Nuria Llagostera Vives (Spain) María José Martínez Sánchez	6	2	[2]

=== Top half ===
First round
(Netherlands) M Krajicek (Germany) M Müller	6	6^{2}	[4]
(Russia) V Dushevina (Russia) E Likhovtseva	4	7	[10]
(China) P Shuai (China) S Tiantian	6	7
(Australia) A Molik (Australia) B Stewart	4	6^{8}
WC	(Germany) S Lisicki (Germany) J Wöhr	5	6	[10]
8	(Spain) A Medina Garrigues (Spain) V Ruano Pascual	7	3	[6]
Alt.	(Russia) A Jidkova (Romania) M Niculescu	2	6	[7]
(Poland) K Jans (Poland) A Rosolska	6	2	[10]
(Argentina) G Dulko (Argentina) B Jozami	6	6
(United States) J Craybas (South Africa) N Grandin	1	1
(Italy) ME Camerin (Russia) N Petrova	4	1
5	(Ukraine) A Bondarenko (Ukraine) K Bondarenko	6	6

Second round
1	(Zimbabwe) C Black (United States) L Huber	6	6
(Russia) V Dushevina (Russia) E Likhovtseva	3	1
(China) P Shuai (China) S Tiantian	6	6
WC	(Germany) S Lisicki (Germany) J Wöhr	4	0
4	(Belarus) V Azarenka (Israel) S Pe'er	6^{3}	6	[10]
(Poland) K Jans (Poland) A Rosolska	7	2	[7]
(Argentina) G Dulko (Argentina) B Jozami	5	3
5	(Ukraine) A Bondarenko (Ukraine) K Bondarenko	7	6

Quarterfinals
1	(Zimbabwe) C Black (United States) L Huber	7	6
(China) P Shuai (China) S Tiantian	6^{4}	4
4	(Belarus) V Azarenka (Israel) S Pe'er	6	7
5	(Ukraine) A Bondarenko (Ukraine) K Bondarenko	1	5

Semifinals
1	(Zimbabwe) C Black (United States) L Huber	3
4	(Belarus) V Azarenka (Israel) S Pe'er	0^{r}

=== Bottom half ===
First round
7	(China) Y Zi (China) Z Jie	1	2
(Spain) N Llagostera Vives (Spain) MJ Martínez Sánchez	6	6
(Belarus) E Dzehalevich (Belarus) O Govortsova	2	6	[6]
(Russia) M Kirilenko (Poland) A Radwańska	6	3	[10]
(Czech Republic) E Hrdinová (Czech Republic) G Navrátilová	2	3
(Belarus) T Poutchek (Russia) A Rodionova	6	6
6	(Russia) D Safina (Russia) E Vesnina	6	6
(Uzbekistan) A Amanmuradova (Russia) G Voskoboeva	2	1
WC	(Australia) C Dellacqua (Switzerland) P Schnyder	6	6
(Ukraine) M Koryttseva (Czech Republic) V Uhlířová	3	4
(China) J Chunmei (China) S Shengnan	6	6
(Italy) T Garbin (Czech Republic) R Voráčová	3	2

Second round
(Spain) N Llagostera Vives (Spain) MJ Martínez Sánchez	6	6
(Russia) M Kirilenko (Poland) A Radwańska	3	4
(Belarus) T Poutchek (Russia) A Rodionova	6	6
3	(Chinese Taipei) Y-J Chan (Chinese Taipei) C-J Chuang	3	4
6	(Russia) D Safina (Russia) E Vesnina	6	6
WC	(Australia) C Dellacqua (Switzerland) P Schnyder	0	3
(China) J Chunmei (China) S Shengnan	3	5
2	(Czech Republic) K Peschke (Australia) R Stubbs	6	7

Quarterfinals
(Spain) N Llagostera Vives (Spain) MJ Martínez Sánchez	7	6
(Belarus) T Poutchek (Russia) A Rodionova	5	1
6	(Russia) D Safina (Russia) E Vesnina	6	3	[8]
2	(Czech Republic) K Peschke (Australia) R Stubbs	4	6	[10]

Semifinals
(Spain) N Llagostera Vives (Spain) MJ Martínez Sánchez	6	3	[16]
2	(Czech Republic) K Peschke (Australia) R Stubbs	2	6	[14]
