= 2008 Family Circle Cup – Doubles =

Doubles
- 2008 Family Circle Cup

Final
- Champions: (Slovenia) Katarina Srebotnik (Japan) Ai Sugiyama
- Runners-up: (Romania) Edina Gallovits (Belarus) Olga Govortsova
- Score: 6–2, 6–2

Details
- Draw: 28
- Seeds: 8

Events
Singles	Doubles
- Charleston Open

Yan Zi and Zheng Jie were the defending champions, but none competed this year.

Katarina Srebotnik and Ai Sugiyama won the title by defeating Edina Gallovits and Olga Govortsova 6–2, 6–2 in the final.

== Seeds ==
The top 4 seeds receive a bye into the second round.

1. (Zimbabwe) Cara Black / (United States) Liezel Huber (semifinals)
2. (Slovenia) Katarina Srebotnik / (Japan) Ai Sugiyama (champions)
3. (Czech Republic) Květa Peschke / (Australia) Rennae Stubbs (quarterfinals)
4. (Chinese Taipei) Chan Yung-jan / (Chinese Taipei) Chuang Chia-jung (quarterfinals)
5. (Russia) Dinara Safina / (Hungary) Ágnes Szávay (quarterfinals)
6. (Russia) Elena Likhovtseva / (United States) Lisa Raymond (quarterfinals)
7. (Spain) Anabel Medina Garrigues / (Spain) Virginia Ruano Pascual (second round)
8. (Belarus) Victoria Azarenka / (Russia) Elena Vesnina (semifinals)

== Draw ==
=== Key ===
- WC = Wild card
- r = Retired
- w/o = Walkover

=== Finals ===
Semifinals
1	(Zimbabwe) Cara Black (United States) Liezel Huber	4	6	[7]
(Romania) Edina Gallovits (Belarus) Olga Govortsova	6	4	[10]
8	(Belarus) Victoria Azarenka (Russia) Elena Vesnina	1	1
2	(Slovenia) Katarina Srebotnik (Japan) Ai Sugiyama	6	6

Final
(Romania) Edina Gallovits (Belarus) Olga Govortsova	2	2
2	(Slovenia) Katarina Srebotnik (Japan) Ai Sugiyama	6	6

=== Top half ===
First round
(United States) V King (China) T Sun	6	6
(United States) A Haynes (Venezuela) M Sequera	4	3
(Hungary) M Czink (South Africa) C Scheepers	6	6
(Argentina) G Dulko (Argentina) ME Salerni	3	0
WC	(United States) A Glatch (United States) V Lepchenko	1	6	[3]
5	(Russia) D Safina (Hungary) Á Szávay	6	3	[10]
(Ukraine) Y Fedak (Russia) A Jidkova	4	5
(Japan) K Iijima (Japan) A Yonemura	6	7
(United States) J Craybas (Netherlands) M Krajicek	3	5
(Romania) E Gallovits (Belarus) O Govortsova	6	7
(Poland) A Radwańska (Czech Republic) B Záhlavová-Strýcová	7	6^{8}	[7]
7	(Spain) A Medina Garrigues (Spain) V Ruano Pascual	5	7	[10]

Second round
1	(Zimbabwe) C Black (United States) L Huber	6	2	[10]
(United States) V King (China) T Sun	4	6	[7]
(Hungary) M Czink (South Africa) C Scheepers	1	4
5	(Russia) D Safina (Hungary) Á Szávay	6	6
3	(Czech Republic) K Peschke (Australia) R Stubbs	7	6
(Japan) K Iijima (Japan) A Yonemura	6^{3}	3
(Romania) E Gallovits (Belarus) O Govortsova	6	6
7	(Spain) A Medina Garrigues (Spain) V Ruano Pascual	3	1

Quarterfinals
1	(Zimbabwe) C Black (United States) L Huber	w/o
5	(Russia) D Safina (Hungary) Á Szávay
3	(Czech Republic) K Peschke (Australia) R Stubbs	2	2
(Romania) E Gallovits (Belarus) O Govortsova	6	6

Semifinals
1	(Zimbabwe) C Black (United States) L Huber	4	6	[7]
(Romania) E Gallovits (Belarus) O Govortsova	6	4	[10]

=== Bottom half ===
First round
8	(Belarus) V Azarenka (Russia) E Vesnina	6	1
Alt	(Romania) S Cîrstea (Japan) A Morita	1	0	r
(Switzerland) T Bacsinszky (Germany) J Schruff	7	0	[7]
(Ukraine) T Perebiynis (Russia) G Voskoboeva	6^{5}	6	[10]
(Belarus) T Poutchek (Russia) A Rodionova	3	6	[10]
WC	(Slovakia) D Cibulková (Slovakia) J Husárová	6	1	[6]
6	(Russia) E Likhovtseva (United States) L Raymond	4	7	[10]
(Australia) M Adamczak (Australia) C Dellacqua	6	6^{5}	[8]
(United States) J Ditty (United States) C Fusano	2	2
(Australia) A Molik (Australia) B Stewart	6	6
(Spain) L Domínguez Lino (Italy) S Errani	1	6	[6]
(United States) B Mattek (Czech Republic) V Uhlířová	6	3	[10]

Second round
8	(Belarus) V Azarenka (Russia) E Vesnina	5	6	[10]
(Ukraine) T Perebiynis (Russia) G Voskoboeva	7	4	[4]
(Belarus) T Poutchek (Russia) A Rodionova	0	0
4	(Chinese Taipei) Y-J Chan (Chinese Taipei) C-J Chuang	6	6
6	(Russia) E Likhovtseva (United States) L Raymond	6	6
(Australia) A Molik (Australia) B Stewart	4	4
(United States) B Mattek (Czech Republic) V Uhlířová	4	1
2	(Slovenia) K Srebotnik (Japan) A Sugiyama	6	6

Quarterfinals
8	(Belarus) V Azarenka (Russia) E Vesnina	6	1	[10]
4	(Chinese Taipei) Y-J Chan (Chinese Taipei) C-J Chuang	2	6	[2]
6	(Russia) E Likhovtseva (United States) L Raymond	7	4	[7]
2	(Slovenia) K Srebotnik (Japan) A Sugiyama	6^{5}	6	[10]

Semifinals
8	(Belarus) V Azarenka (Russia) E Vesnina	1	1
2	(Slovenia) K Srebotnik (Japan) A Sugiyama	6	6
