= 2008 Qatar Ladies Open =

- Date: February 18 – February 24
- Edition: 8th
- Venue: Khalifa International Tennis and Squash Complex

Champions

Singles
- (Russia) Maria Sharapova

Doubles
- (Czech Republic) Květa Peschke / (Australia) Rennae Stubbs
- Qatar Ladies Open

The 2008 Qatar Ladies Open, known as the 2008 Qatar Total Open, for sponsorship reasons, was a tennis tournament played on outdoor hard courts. It was the 8th edition of the Qatar Total Open, and was part of the Tier I Series of the 2008 WTA Tour. It took place at the Khalifa International Tennis and Squash Complex in Doha, Qatar, from February 18 through February 24, 2008.

The field was led by WTA No. 2 and Australian Open finalist Ana Ivanovic, US Open and Sydney runner-up and defending finalist Svetlana Kuznetsova, and Australian Open semifinalist Jelena Janković. Other top seeds were Australian Open champion and 2005 Doha titlist Maria Sharapova, Paris winner Anna Chakvetadze, Venus Williams, Daniela Hantuchová and Marion Bartoli.

The granting of a visa to Shahar Pe'er to play in the tournament was considered a diplomatic success.

== Champions ==
=== Singles ===
(Russia) Maria Sharapova def. (Russia) Vera Zvonareva, 6–1, 2–6, 6–0

- It was Maria Sharapova's 2nd title of the year, and her 18th overall. It was her 6th Tier I title, and her 2nd win at the event, after 2005.

=== Doubles ===
(Czech Republic) Květa Peschke / (Australia) Rennae Stubbs def. (Zimbabwe) Cara Black / (United States) Liezel Huber, 6–1, 5–7, 10–7
