= 2008 Family Circle Cup =

- Date: April 14–20
- Edition: 36th
- Category: WTA Tier I
- Draw: 56S / 28D
- Prize money: $1,340,000
- Surface: Clay / outdoor
- Location: Charleston, South Carolina, U.S.
- Venue: Family Circle Tennis Center
- Attendance: 90,437

Champions

Singles
- (United States) Serena Williams

Doubles
- (Slovenia) Katarina Srebotnik / (Japan) Ai Sugiyama
← 2007 ·	Family Circle Cup	· 2009 →

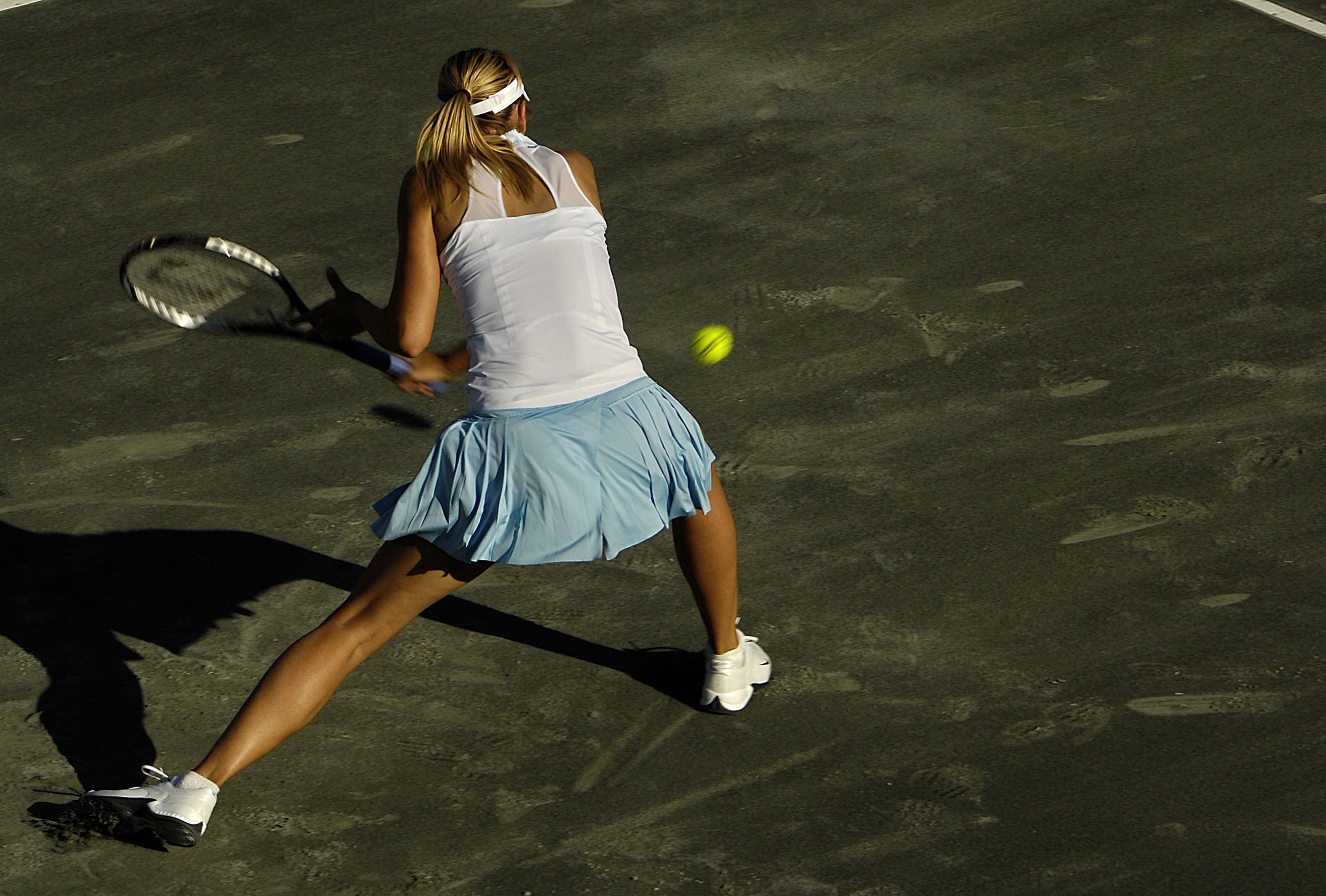
Maria Sharapova during the 2008 Family Circle Cup played on green clay

The 2008 Family Circle Cup was a women's tennis Tier I event on the 2008 WTA Tour, which took place from April 14 to April 20, 2008. The event was hosted at the Family Circle Tennis Center, in Charleston, South Carolina, United States and was the second event of the clay court season, played on green clay courts. The total prize money offered at this tournament was US$1,340,000.

Defending champion Jelena Janković led the field as the number one seed. Maria Sharapova, Anna Chakvetadze, Elena Dementieva and eventual champion Serena Williams joined her as the other four of five top ten players in the field. Other notable names that participated were 2007 Wimbledon finalist Marion Bartoli and Charleston standout Patty Schnyder, a two-time runner-up at this event.

== Finals ==
=== Singles ===
(United States) Serena Williams defeated (Russia) Vera Zvonareva, 6–4, 3–6, 6–3

- It was Williams' 3rd title of the year and 31st of her career.

=== Doubles ===
(Slovenia) Katarina Srebotnik / (Japan) Ai Sugiyama defeated (Romania) Edina Gallovits / (Belarus) Olga Govortsova, 6–2, 6–2
