= 2008 Qatar Telecom German Open =

- Date: 5–11 May
- Edition: 97th
- Category: Tier I
- Draw: 56S / 28D
- Prize money: $1,340,000
- Surface: Clay / outdoor
- Location: Berlin, Germany
- Venue: Rot-Weiss Tennis Club

Champions

Singles
- (Russia) Dinara Safina

Doubles
- (Zimbabwe) Cara Black / (United States) Liezel Huber
- WTA German Open

The 2008 Qatar Telecom German Open was a women's tennis event that was played from 5 May to 11 May 2008. It was one of two Tier I events that took place on red clay in the build-up to the second Grand Slam of the year, the French Open. It was the 97th edition of the tournament and was played at the Rot-Weiss Tennis Club in the German capital of Berlin. The tournaments offered a total prize fund of US$1,300,000 across all rounds.

World number one Justine Henin, the three-time French Open defending champion, was the tournament's top seed. She was hoping to win this event for the fourth time after collecting titles here in 2002, 2003 and 2005. Defending champion Ana Ivanovic was Henin's biggest threat for the title as the number two seed, with Jelena Janković and Svetlana Kuznetsova rounding out the top four seeds. Fifth seed Serena Williams was also a big threat for the title; she had won her last three tournaments and is a former French Open champion. Russian pair Anna Chakvetadze and Elena Dementieva brought the field up to seven of the world's top ten players. Maria Sharapova and Daniela Hantuchová were also due to play the event but it was announced that both had pulled out on 30 April.

== Review ==
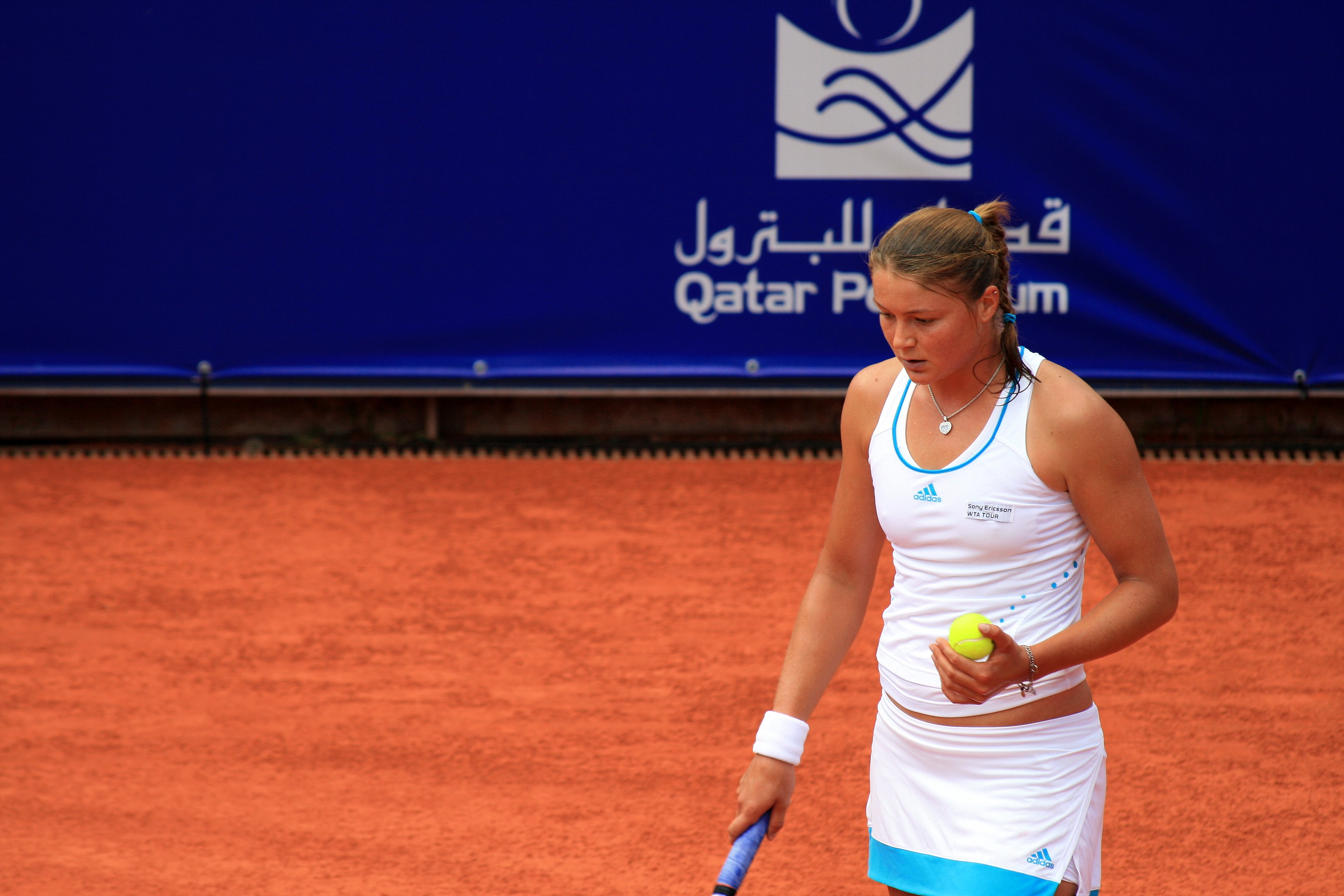
Champion Dinara Safina during the final match.

The tournament was won by Dinara Safina, who started the tournament as the thirteenth seed. She enjoyed the best week of her career to win her first ever Tier I title. In the third round, she beat top seed Justine Henin in a match that turned out to be the last before she retired, her second victory over a world number one, and followed it up by stopping Serena Williams's 17-match winning streak. She defeated Elena Dementieva (who had defeated defending champion Ivanovic in the semi-finals) in the final, in the 14th all-Russian final on the WTA Tour, and the third of five in the 2008 season (Dementieva would go on to beat Safina in the final of the Olympics).

Ana Ivanovic was the only top six seed to reach the semifinals in a tournament littered with upsets. Henin and Williams lost the aforementioned matches to Safina, third seed Svetlana Kuznetsova lost to Alyona Bondarenko, Jelena Janković lost to Elena Dementieva and Anna Chakvetadze went down in her first match to Victoria Azarenka, who eventually made her first ever Tier I semifinal. Ivanovic, for her part, was defeated in the semi-finals by Elena Dementieva; the defeat dropped her to World No. 3 behind Henin and Maria Sharapova at the conclusion of the tournament.

World number ones Cara Black and Liezel Huber won the doubles title, beating the unseeded Spanish pairing Nuria Llagostera Vives and María José Martínez Sánchez, who had upset number two seeds Květa Peschke and Rennae Stubbs in a thrilling match tiebreak in the semifinals, which ended at 16–14.

== Finals ==
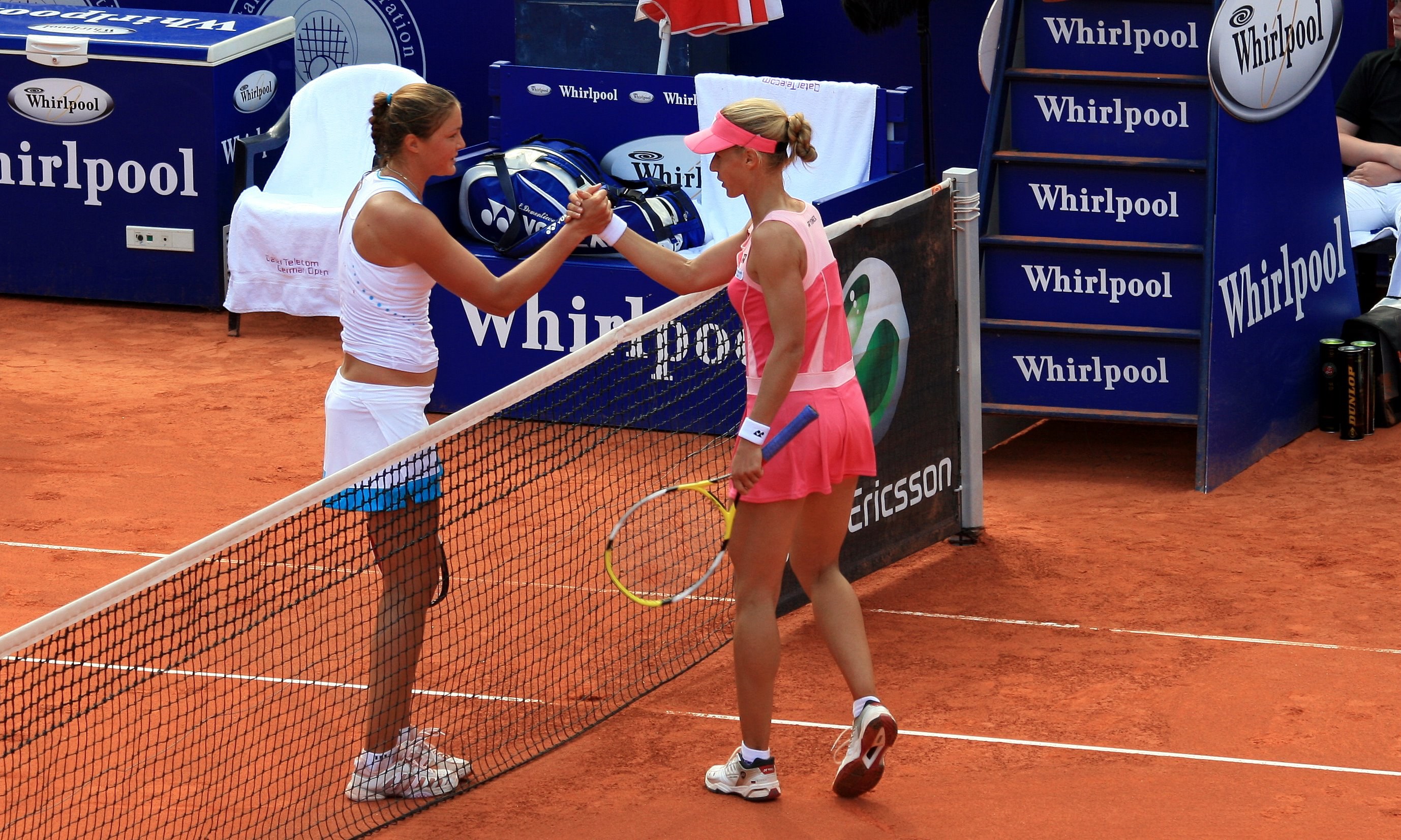
Dinara Safina (l) and Elena Dementieva (r) shake hands after the final.

=== Singles ===
(Russia) Dinara Safina defeated (Russia) Elena Dementieva, 3–6, 6–2, 6–2

- It was Safina's first title of the year and 6th of her career.

=== Doubles ===
(Zimbabwe) Cara Black / (United States) Liezel Huber defeated (Spain) Nuria Llagostera Vives / (Spain) María José Martínez Sánchez, 3–6, 6–2, [10–2]

== Prize money and points ==
Total prize money: $1,300,000

Round	Singles		Doubles	
Round	Prize money ($)	WTA ranking points	Prize money ($)	WTA ranking points
Winner	196,900	430	59,000	430
Finalist	100,000	300	30,000	300
Semifinal	51,000	195	15,351	195
Quarterfinal	26,050	110	7,800	110
Round of 16	13,285	60	3,980	60
Round of 32	6,775	35	2,030	1
Round of 64	3,455	1	-	-

== Images ==
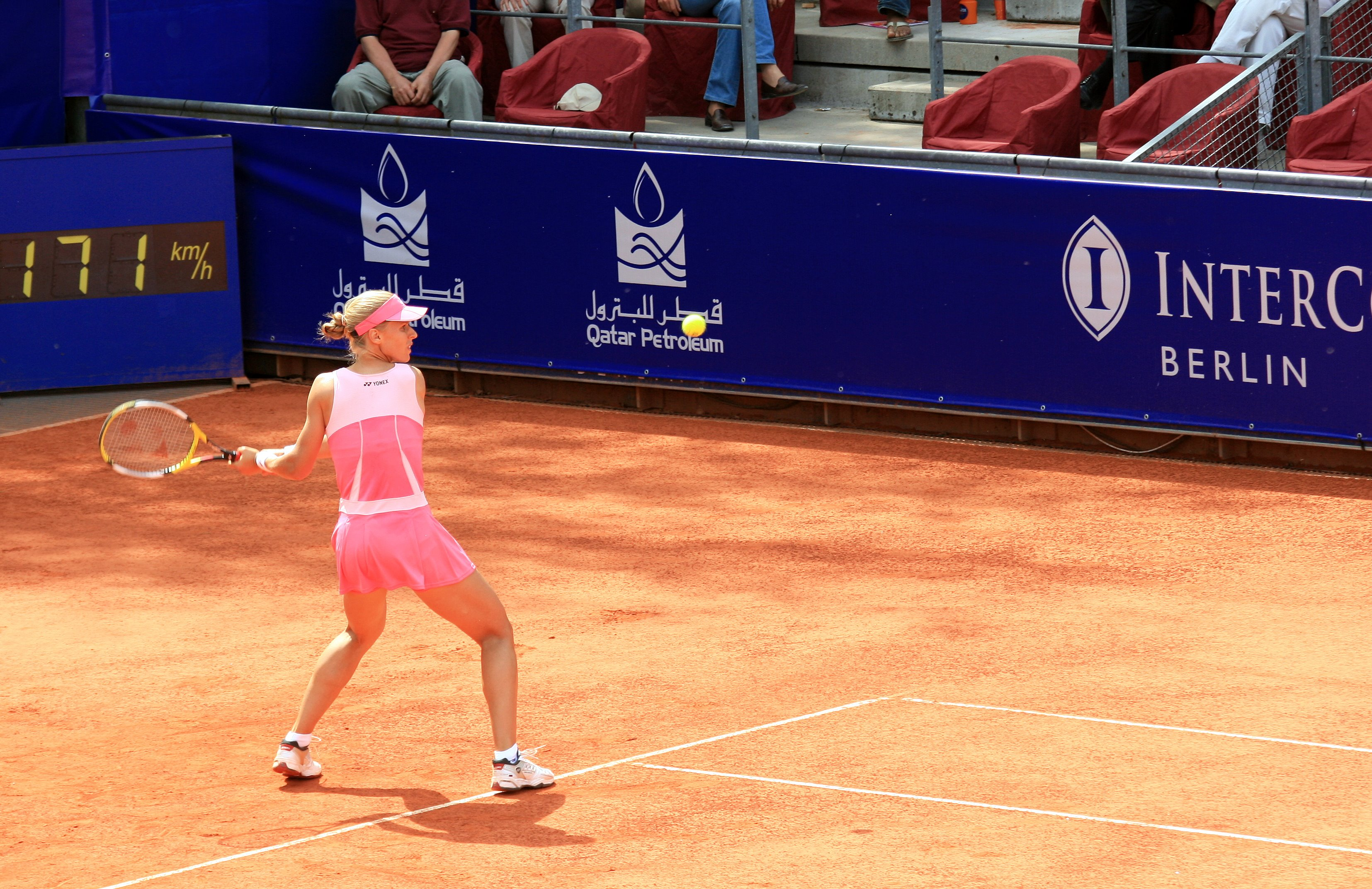
Dementieva hitting a backhand.

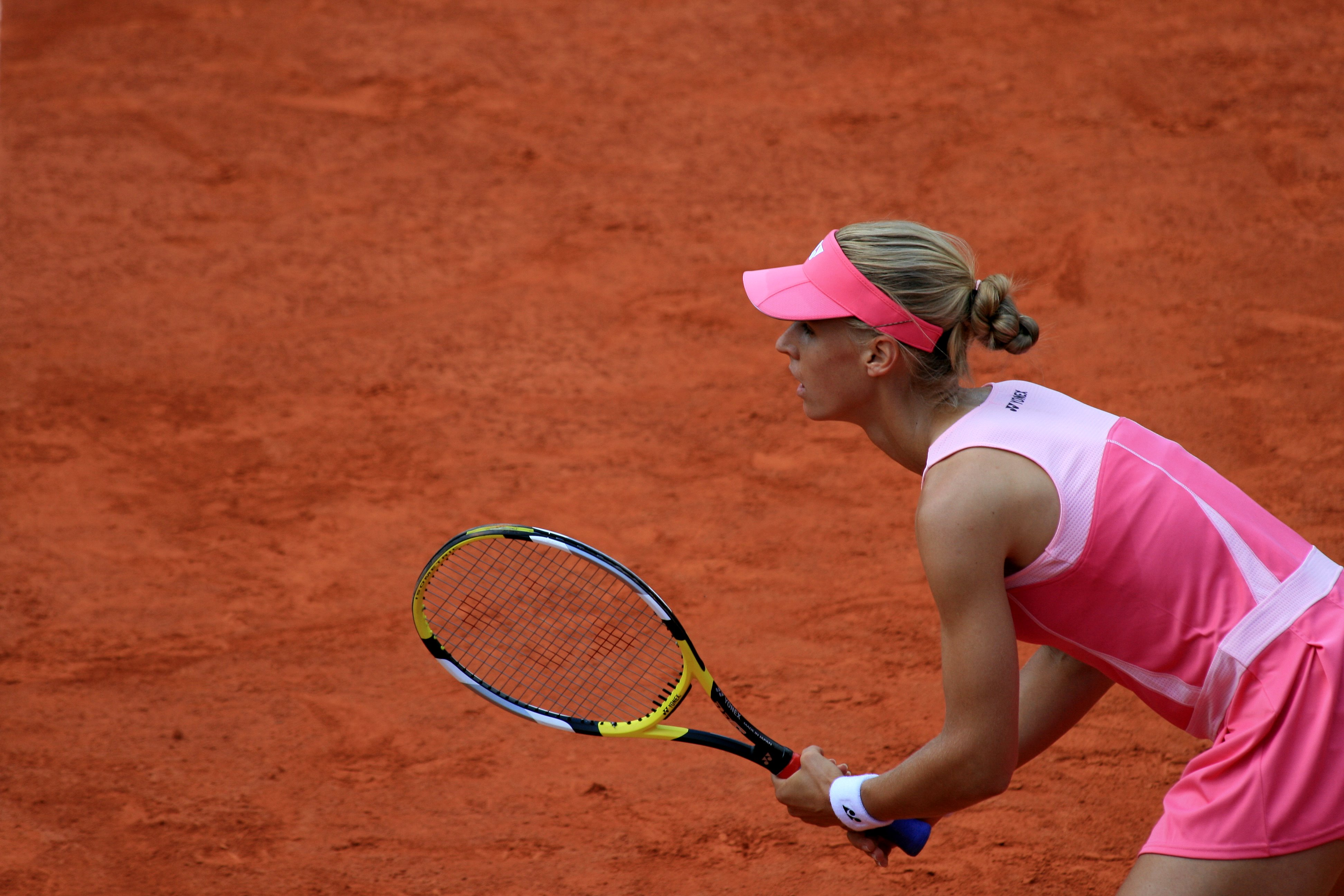
Preparing for a serve.
