= 2008 Ana Ivanovic tennis season =

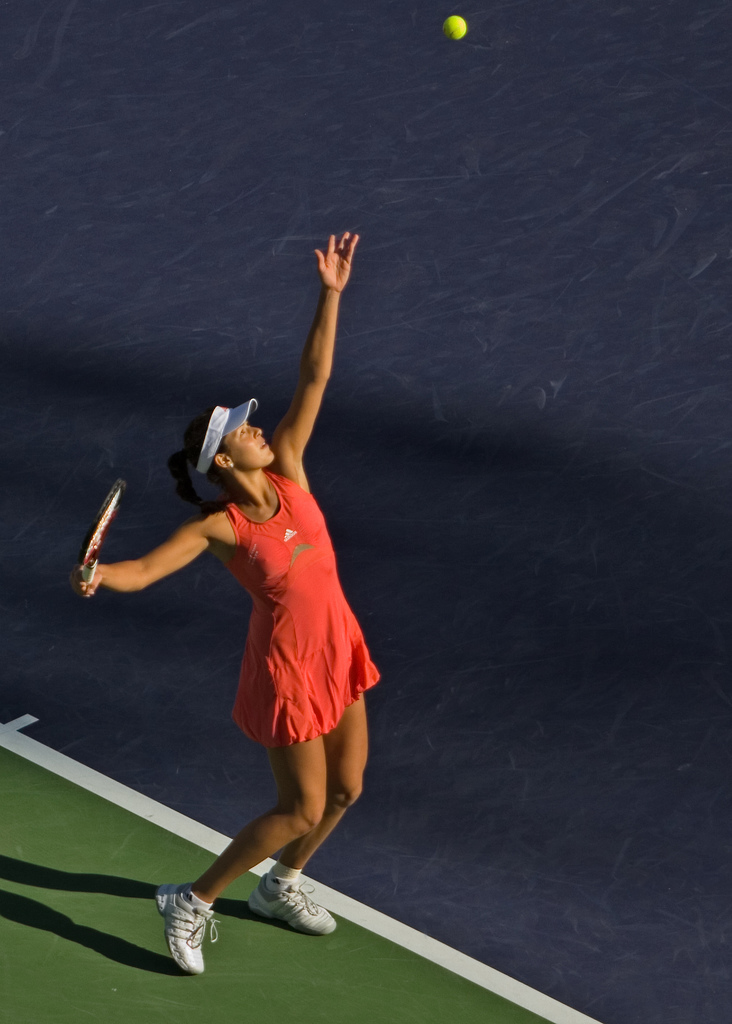
- Ana Ivanovic at the Indian Wells
- Full name: Ana Ivanovic
- Country: Serbia
- Calendar prize money: $3,119,640

Singles
- Season record: 38–15
- Calendar titles: 3
- Year-end ranking: No. 5
- Ranking change from previous year: ▼1

Grand Slam & significant results
- Australian Open: F
- French Open: W
- Wimbledon: 3R
- US Open: 2R
- Tour Finals: RR
- Olympic Games: A

Doubles
- Season record: 2–1

Fed Cup
- Fed Cup: WG II Play-offs (Adv. to 2009 WG II)
- Last updated on: 26 June 2016.

The 2008 Ana Ivanovic tennis season officially began on 8 January with the start of the 2008 Medibank International Sydney in Sydney and ended with the 2008 WTA Tour Championships. Ivanovic entered the season as the number four ranked player and the defending champion at three tournaments and finalist at previous year's French Open.

During the season, Ivanovic reached second Grand Slam final at Australian Open which she lost, but at the next one at French Open she won her first Grand Slam trophy. With semifinal win, she assured becoming the World No. 1 and being the first Serbian to do so. Ivanovic held the top spot for 12 non-consecutive weeks, but finished the year as number five.

In 2008, Ivanovic won Sony Ericsson WTA Tour Diamond ACES Award, German Tennis Magazine Michael Westphal Award and International Tennis Writer's Association Ambassador of the Year 2008.

== Year in details ==
=== Australian Open series ===
==== Hong Kong exhibition ====
Despite Ivanovic officially began season playing in Sydney, she participated also in an exhibition tournament in Hong Kong, when was the first week of new tennis season. Exhibition is constructed of eight players playing in knock-out system, starting from quarterfinal stage. Six of the eight players were in the world's top 10 at the moment. Ivanovic was first seed and was drawn to play against fifth seed Elena Dementieva. She eventually lost 4–6, 6–1, 3–6. After losing in group named Golden Group, she played another match in Silver Group for players who lost their quarterfinal matches. However, Ivanovic looked now indifferently playing dead rubber, and lost 1–6, 3–6 to Shuai Peng.

==== Medibank International ====
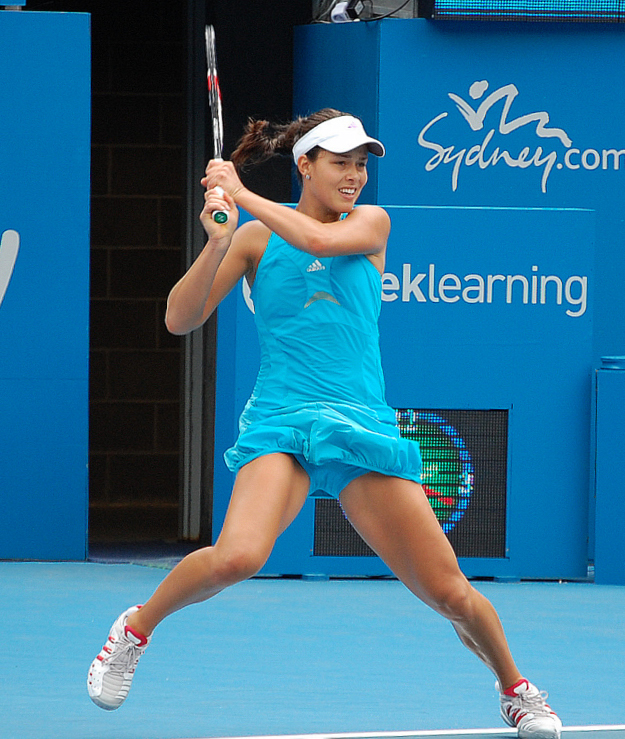
Ivanovic opened 2008 season at Medibank International in Sydney.

Ivanovic's first tournament of the year was at Medibank International. All players from top 4 competed, so she was seeded just fourth with the ranking of number four. After receiving bye in the first round, she won tight first match of the year against number 30 Virginie Razzano, coming back from 2–5 to win 6–1, 2–6, 7–5. Playing in the quarterfinals against two spots better ranked player, Katarina Srebotnik, Ivanovic won easier with 6–2 in third set. In the semifinals, opponent was number 1, Justine Henin, whom she has never beaten before. This time she was closest to winning, but lost a very tight match with the score of 2–6, 6–2, 4–6. Ivanovic rose to world number three for the first time after this tournament.

==== Australian Open ====
Despite being new world number three, Ivanovic was seeded fourth as points from Sydney didn't affect the rankings because of it being played when the Australian Open draw was already out. Ivanovic's first opponent was Sorana Cîrstea, the only player outside the top 100 which she played against at this tournament. She won in tight two straight sets. In the next round however, she lost just three games against Tathiana Garbin, including bagel in the first set. In third and fourth round she won both matches in straight sets, against 28th seed Katarina Srebotnik and Danish youngster, the future No. 1, Caroline Wozniacki. Though she missed likes of Justine Henin and Serena Williams, whom she has never beaten before, in her side of the draw, opponent in the quarterfinal was eight seed Venus Williams, who also never lost a match to Ivanovic at that point. However, Ivanovic showed no signs of fear and beat older Williams sister for the first time, 7–6, 6–4. Ivanovic was serving at 4–2 and was point from 5–2 lead in first set but however the set gone to tiebreak which she won 7–3. In second set, she came roaring back from 0–3, winning six of the next seven games. The win was also significant because of breaking the barrier as Ivanovic lost at both previous Grand Slams in last season just to Venus. She was given the nickname "Aussie Ana" during the on-court interview with Todd Woodbridge following the victory over Williams.

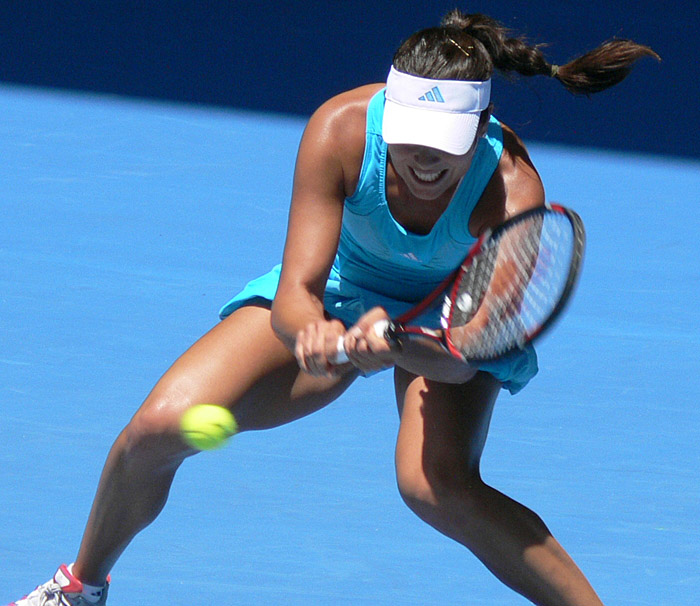
Ivanovic at the Australian Open.

In semifinals she played against ninth seed Daniela Hantuchová. Match started badly for Ivanovic, and fast she was 0–6, 0–2 down. Although just trying to get on the board at the moment, since winning that first game in the third game of the set, things got better, as she subsequently broke back and soon closed set after breaking later again and served the set out. In decider, both were holding serve until four all. Ivanovic got break point and immediately after found herself in the position to close the match out. She did it at love, winning with 0–6, 6–3, 6–4 scoreline. Despite having not reached even fourth round at event before, now she reached the final. But however, she lost the match to fifth seed Maria Sharapova, losing her second Grand Slam final. Though she was close to win the first set at 5–4 and 0–30 when Maria served, she missed the chance to take the first set, and eventually lost in straight sets, 5–7, 3–6.

==== Fed Cup ====
Only few days after Australian campaign, Ivanovic flew to Budapest to play Fed Cup Europe/Africa Zone Group I with fellow top 10 Sebian player Jelena Janković. Consequences of fatigue were seen as she won two of three matches in tight three sets. In round robin they faced Poland and Romania, and Ivanovic won against Urszula Radwańska in straight sets and Monica Niculescu after hard fought match in three sets. Playing against Netherlands, both Ivanovic and Janković won singles matches (Ivanovic against Renée Reinhard in three sets) and they advanced to World Group II Play-offs for the second straight year.

=== Middle East Series ===
==== Qatar Ladies Open ====
As the world number three, Ivanovic was seeded first for the first time in her career at Qatar Ladies Open. After receiving first round bye, Ivanovic was set to play for the first time against Olga Govortsova. Being two points from victory, Ivanovic twisted left ankle and immediately after took a medical timeout. She succeeded to finish the match soon, though finishing it in tears, but due to injury alert, she decided to take a break and recover, giving a walkover to Agnieszka Radwańska in third round. In spite of the fact that she didn't earn too many points after Doha, Ivanovic set new career-high ranking at number two, overtaking the spot from Svetlana Kuznetsova. However, at the moment top-ranked player Justine Henin had nearly as many points as Ivanovic and Kuznetsova together.

==== Dubai Tennis Championships ====
Despite twisting ankle few days ago in Doha, Ivanovic looked fresh and injury-free in Dubai. After receiving bye in the first round, she lost just four games against number 14 Nicole Vaidišová, bageling in second set. However, she was given a tough task in quarterfinals, as she never won a match in previous three meetings with Elena Dementieva. Ivanovic took first set, but lost next two in quite one way, winning three games in both sets.

=== Indian Wells & Miami ===
==== Pacific Life Open ====
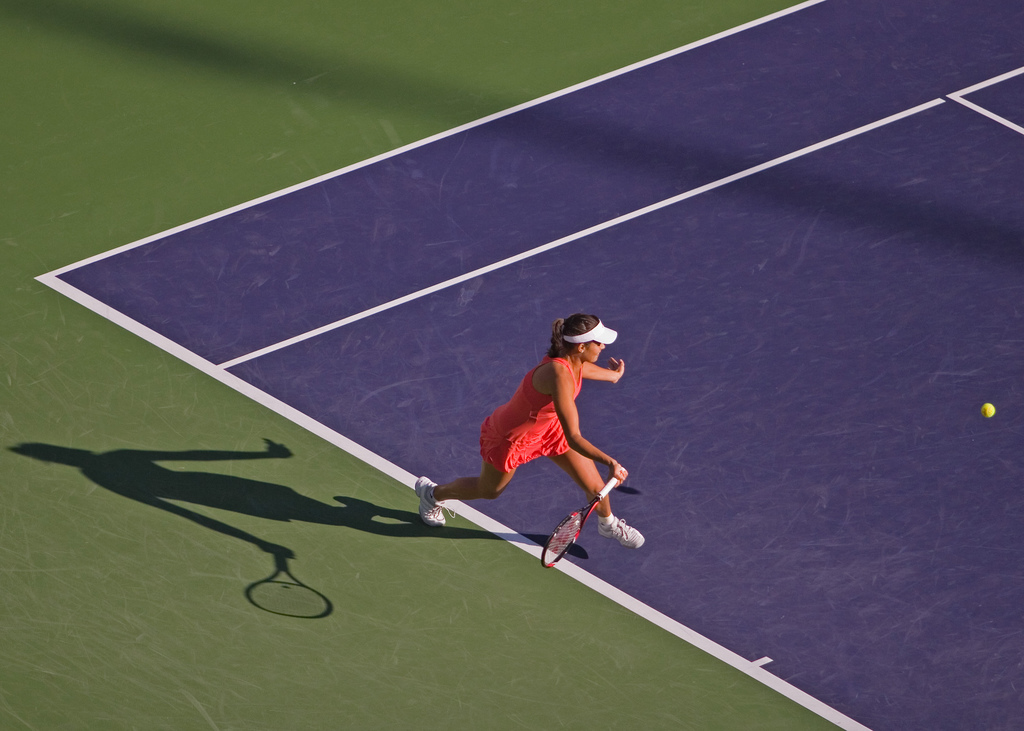
Ivanovic returning serve at Pacific Life Open.

Ivanovic was once again seeded first after being first seed already in Doha. Playing her first match at Pacific Life Open against number 77 Raluca Olaru, she had to give her best to get through inspired opponent and she eventually recovered from second set loss with 6–0 in the third set, winning after nearly two hours. Though her next opponent was 31st seed, Tathiana Garbin, Ivanovic had better time on court now, as she lost three games in first set and bageled for the fifth time in a season in second set. In round of 16 another Italian, Francesca Schiavone, awaited. Thirteenth seed Schiavone started better, cruising through first set losing just two games. However, after managing to win the second set 7–5, she cruised herself through the third set, losing two games. In the quarterfinals, she faced one spot better ranked player, Vera Zvonareva, at number 21. But Ivanovic showed that ranking is not the most important thing that matters, as she beat her a lot easier, losing just five games to reach first semifinal in Indian Wells, enhancing previous best result of quarterfinals. Facing top 10 opponent for the fifth time in a season and world number 4 in Jelena Janković, Ivanovic won in straight sets to reach first final of Indian Wells Masters. Ivanovic improved head-to-head record to 5−1 against Janković. In the final she played against Svetlana Kuznetsova, the final contested of first and second seed. Ivanovic won 6–4, 6–3 to win third Tier I title, the biggest after Grand Slam. This was her first title of 2008. Also, as Indian Wells is called "The fifth Grand Slam", and as Ivanovic didn't won any Grand Slam at the moment, this was her biggest title at that moment. She also improved to convincing head-to-head with Kuznetsova, the same as with Janković, 5−1.

==== Sony Ericsson Open ====
Coming to Miami Open with Indian Wells title, Ivaonovic looked confidently from the first match on, as she cruised against Émilie Loit to reach third round, losing just three games. But however, in the next round it looked like fatigue caught up with her, and she lost easily in straight sets, but to former number one Lindsay Davenport.

=== Clay court season and French Open ===
==== Fed Cup ====
Ivanovic once again participated in Fed Cup this year, playing in Fed Cup World Group II Play-offs, in duel of Serbia and Croatia on harcourt indoors, played in Zagreb, Croatia. Despite the event was played on hardcourt, it was a preparation for Ivanovic's clay season which started just few days later. She helped Serbia cruise to massive 3–0 lead which already secured them a spot in 2009 Fed Cup World Group II, the first time that Serbia reached that stage at Fed Cup under its name, but as Yugoslavia, they reached World Group semifinal in 1984. Croatia won next two dead rubbers though, meaning that final score was 3–2 for Serbia.

==== Qatar Telecom German Open ====
Ivanovic started clay season returning to Berlin as the defending champion. After receiving bye in first round, she played against lucky luser Akgul Amanmuradova and won after tight first set which saw them playing tiebreak that Ivanovic won 7–0 and cruising then through the second set. She beat Sybille Bammer 7–5, 4–6, 6–4 to reach quarterfinals, and tenth seed Ágnes Szávay 3–6, 6–4, 6–3 to go two steps from defending title for the first time. However, she was stopped in semifinals when she lost 2–6, 5–7 to Elena Dementieva, losing to her for the second time in the season and fourth overall.

==== Internazionali BNL d'Italia ====
Following withdraws of the two best players in the world, Justine Henin and Maria Sharapova, Ivanovic was seeded first in Rome. She lost already in second round and in her opening match to qualifier Tsvetana Pironkova in three sets, 4–6, 7–5, 2–6.

==== French Open ====
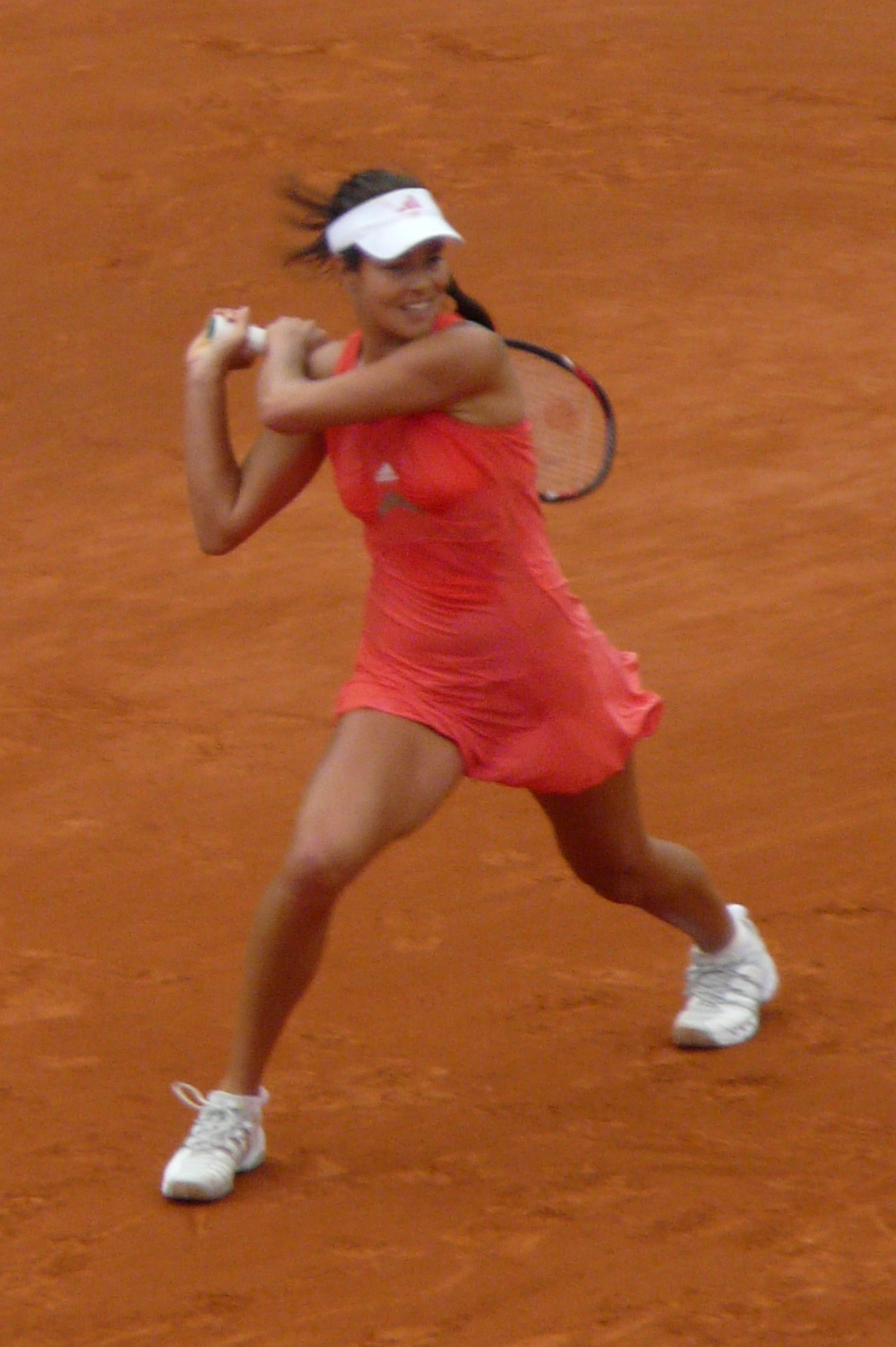
Ivanovic became the new world No. 1 after winning her first grand slam singles title at the 2008 French Open.

Ivanovic came to French Open as last year runner-up and as a second contender for the title, after renewed world No. 1 Maria Sharapova, who took that place from Justine Henin who suddenly retired from tennis in less than a fortnight before Roland Garros started. The fact that three-time defending champion at French Open Henin, and four-time champion overall didn't compete, left the draw wide open and gave chances to many players, as the only other former champion was Serena Williams.

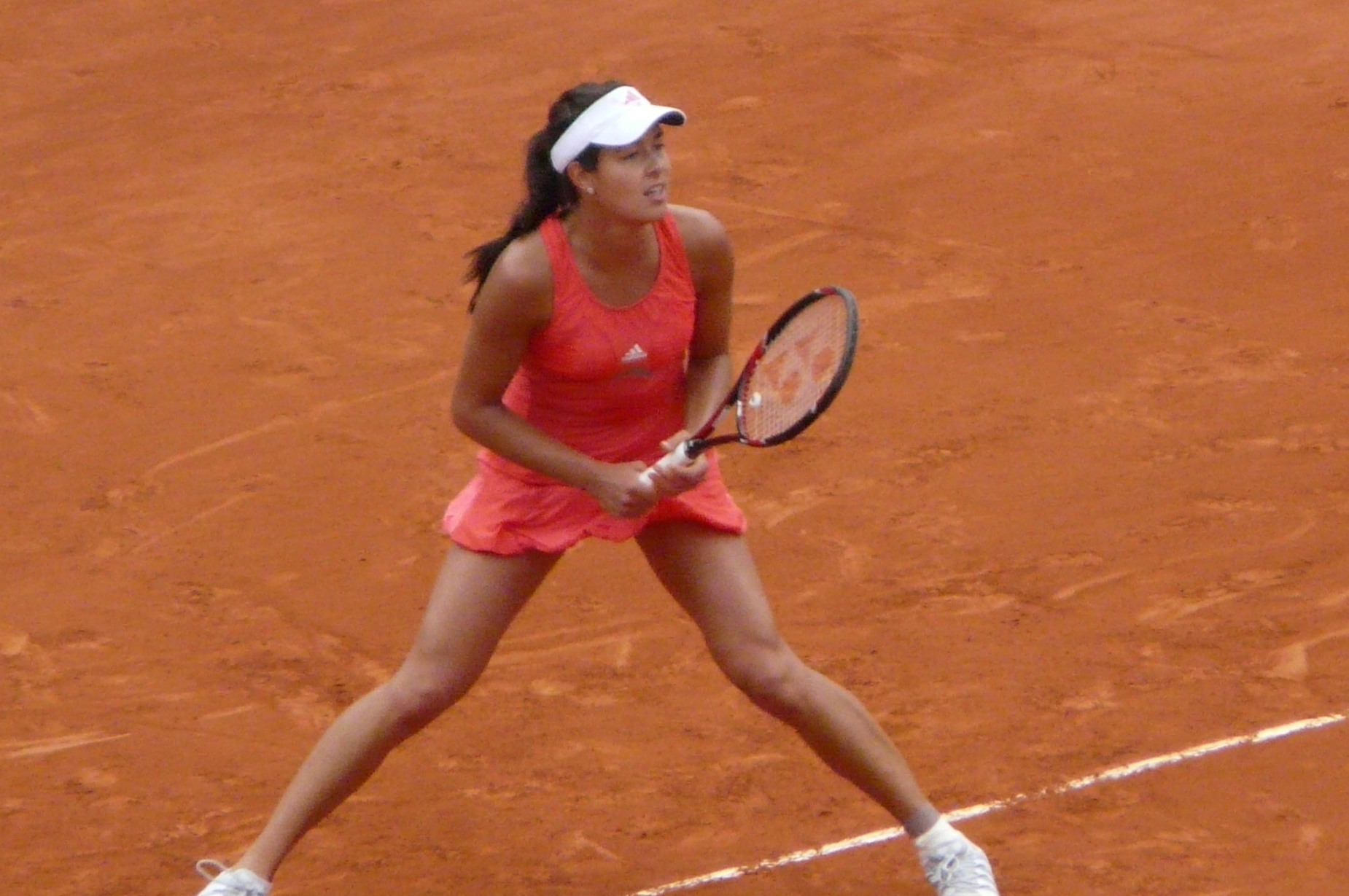
Ivanovic during the French Open quarterfinal.

As Sharapova was first seed, and Ivanovic second, they were set in line for the final clash, which would have been rematch of the Australian Open final that year. However, chances for that were blown when Maria lost in fourth round to thirteenth seed Dinara Safina. On the other side, Ivanovic brushed aside all opponents to reach third French Open quarterfinal in four years. She won against Sofia Arvidsson 6–2, 7–5, Lucie Šafářová 6–1, 6–2, 30th seed Caroline Wozniacki 6–4, 6–1, and Petra Cetkovská 6–0, 6–0, respectively. Double bagel against Cetkovská was Ivanovic's fifth career double bagel win. In quarterfinals Ivanovic beat 10th seed Patty Schnyder 6–3, 6–2. Then she was set to play against fellow Serbian player and No. 3 Jelena Janković. The most significant match between the pair took place in this semi-final of the French Open, with the winner having assured of becoming World No. 1 and with both women bidding to win their first Grand Slam title. Ivanovic won the match, recovering from a 3–1 final set deficit and also 4–3 deficit when Janković broke, to defeat Janković for the fifth consecutive time, with final score of 6–4, 3–6, 6–4. In doing so, Ivanovic reached second straight French Open final and third Slam final overall.

"It was an amazing experience and I still don't realise that I have won it.
It was a very nervous match with lots of chances but I was able to keep
my composure until the end. I am very thrilled to be the champion."

— Ana Ivanovic after winning French Open with
6–4, 6–3 win over Dinara Safina.

Dinara Safina, who beat Sharapova and another two Russians Elena Dementieva and Svetlana Kuznetsova, awaited in the final. Ivanovic build big lead from first moment on, leading 4–1 with two breaks. From that moment, she lost that first momentum, losing both breaks to fell on 4–4 egal. However, she was lucky to not fell even more, breaking again to serve for set, which she did for 6–4. She showed even stronger performance in second set, and lifted first Grand Slam trophy after one-sided win of 6–4, 6–3. Ivanovic became the 17th world No. 1 in history of WTA rankings. Also, she is one of the few players of newer generation to win Major title with that few years, at 20 years and 214 days.

=== Wimbledon ===
Ivanovic skipped all events in preparation for Wimbledon, where she was seeded first for the first time at Grand Slam. It didn't look to bother her as she cruised through first round, losing just three games against No. 103 Rossana de los Ríos. Playing against just six spots better ranked player, she had much tougher time on court, coming back from brink of defeat by saving match points to win against Nathalie Dechy, 6–7, 7–6, 10–8.

"She played really well today and it was a tough match for me.
I'm disappointed with my loss but I still look at it as a learning experience."
"It was a very emotional last couple of weeks for me and it took a bit of a toll.
I didn't have great preparation."

— Ana Ivanovic on losing to Jie Zheng at Wimbledon Championships
after a 1–6, 4–6 blowout.

She fell in third round to wildcard No. 133 Jie Zheng, 1–6, 4–6. Ivanovic played very bad match, winning just 46% of her first serve points and total of just 51% of all points on serve, converting just one break point on seven chances and making 17 unforced errors to Zheng's 10. Her exit in the third round was earliest for the top seed since 2001, when Martina Hingis lost to Virginia Ruano Pascual in first round. Ivanovic, though, ended up to be just one of the five players of the top 8 to fall before the quarterfinals, the round they were all projected to get through as of their rankings. Also, on the men's side was even worse situation as only first two seeds reached quarterfinals, though they eventually reached the final.

=== US Open Series ===
==== East West Bank Classic – withdrew ====
Ivanovic was set to return to action in Los Angeles, but however, she withdrew due to a thumb injury sustained during practice the week before.

==== Rogers Cup ====
First tournament she played eventually within US Open Series was the only Tier I tournament of the American summer swing in Montreal. Ivanovic was again first seed as the newest world No. 1 and the first opponent in the second round after receiving a bye in first was Petra Kvitová. Kvitová, future multiple Grand Slam champion but now just a teenager, won the second set to equalise result but however, Ivanovic got through in three tough sets. In the third round she lost to a player near outside the top 100 at 94, Tamira Paszek, with 2–6, 6–1, 2–6 scoreline.

==== Summer Olympics – withdrew ====
Ivanovic was seeded first at Summer Olympics. This was about to be her first appearance at the Olympics. She was even scheduled to play at the time of the release of the draw, but she eventually withdrew again due to a thumb injury sustained two weeks before, the same reason she withdrew from East West Bank Classic tournament in Los Angeles. Ivanovic described these moments as "one of the worst moments of her career." As of the last year's calendar, points from previous year's Los Angeles tournament which was in this time of the year were deleted, and as she didn't participate this year in Los Angeles nor gained enough points in Montreal, she fell from the No. 1 spot for the first time after just 9 consecutive weeks. New world No. 1 was another Serbian Jelena Janković.

==== US Open ====
Though missing nearly all US Open series season, playing just one tournament in preparation for US Open, Ivanovic returned again to No. 1 spot after Olympics, as Janković lost points from last year's Rogers Cup which was at the time of this year's Olympics, leaving Janković with just one week at No. 1 spot. With playing just that one tournament in Montreal, this was Ivanovic's third tournament in Grand Slam category of all last four tournaments she played. Hard times since dream run at French Open continued for Ivanovic, as she had to battle in three sets already in first round of US Open, winning 6–1, 4–6, 6–4 against Vera Dushevina. But another early exit followed by as she lost to unheralded qualifier and No. 188 Julie Coin, losing with 3–6, 6–4, 3–6 final score. The loss was the earliest defeat of the top-seeded player at the US Open since the 1973 tournament, when Billie Jean King lost in third round. Ivanovic also surpassed her negative record in terms of Lowest-ranked players to defeat world No. 1. First, she lost to No. 133 Jie Zheng at Wimbledon Championships, and now to No. 188 Julie Coin at US Open. However, one year later Dinara Safina "dethroned" her from that place, losing to No. 226 Shuai Zhang.

After US Open, when new rankings were released, Ivanovic finished her stay at the top spot, as US Open champion Serena Williams reached that spot for the first time since 2003. Ivanovic stayed for a total of 12 weeks at the top spot, with one week pause during the Olympic Games. Ivanovic fell to No. 3.

=== Asian hard court swing ===
==== Toray Pan Pacific Open ====
Ivanovic started Asian swing in Tokyo, Tier I tournament, where she was last year's runner-up. She lost to #20 Nadia Petrova 1–6, 6–1, 2–6 in the second round. With the loss, she was then at 4–4 win-loss record since winning French Open. Ivanovic later told the press that she was "just happy to be back injury-free" and that she needed to "play more matches to get back into rhythm."

==== China Open ====
Going to Beijing, China, for the first time ever Ivanovic came in one place lower ranked than previous week at No. 4. She played evidently the best match since lifting French Open title as she cruised against #19 Alizé Cornet, winning 6–1, 7–6. She lost once again to Jie Zheng, the same player who beat her at Wimbledon, but eventually losing 6–7, 6–2, 4–6.

=== Indoors and year-end Championships ===
==== Kremlin Cup ====
Ana Ivanovic declined in the WTA rankings from No. 1 prior to the US Open to No. 3, No. 4, and then No. 5. She lost her first match to Dominika Cibulková in three sets at the Kremlin Cup in Moscow. Following her French Open title, Ivanovic held a 5-6 win-loss record.

==== Zurich Open ====
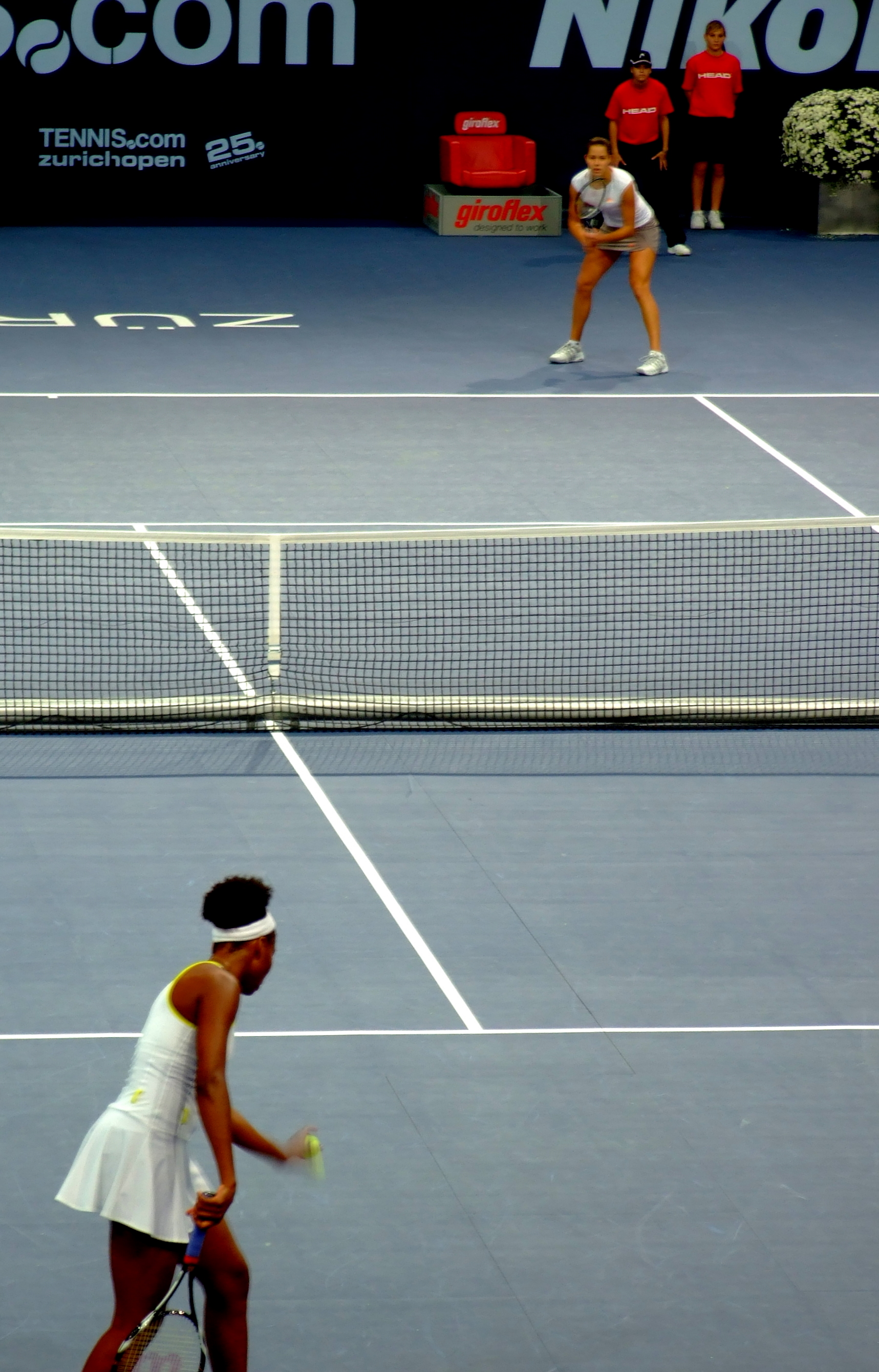
Ivanovic during the Zurich semifinals against Venus Williams.

Despite losing straightaway in Moscow, Ivanovic came back to No. 4. And after series of bad results, she finally won back-to-back matches in Zurich – after receiving bye in first round, she won easily against #16 Marion Bartoli and promising Petra Kvitová whom she beat earlier in Montreal but in three sets. She lost a total of 11 games in that two matches. She lost in semifinals to top 10 opponent Venus Williams after winning first set, but showed a big step forward after series of bad results.

==== Generali Ladies Linz ====
Ivanovic chose not to defend Luxembourg title, which turned out to be great as she followed good run in Zurich with even better in Linz by winning first title since French Open. On the way to the title, she beat first Sybille Bammer and seventh seed Flavia Pennetta, both in straight sets. Ana described match with Flavia as "one of the best matches she's played recently". She followed that with two respective wins over top 10 opponents – #10 Agnieszka Radwańska with hard fought 6–2, 3–6, 7–5 win, and routing win over #9 Vera Zvonareva, 6–2, 6–1 to win the title. She sealed an impressive win in just 51 minutes.

==== WTA Tour Championships ====
Last tournament of the year for Ivanovic was the most prestigious one after Majors – WTA Tour Championships, where she qualified for the second straight year. Despite coming with two back-to-back good tournaments, Ivanovic though didn't have good time in Doha Championships, as she lost to #1 Jelena Janković after winning their last four meetings, and making a surpassing loss to Vera Zvonareva whom she beat in just more than a week losing three games. She eventually withdrew before third match due to a virus.

Ivanovic finished the year ranked at No. 5, one place worse from last year.

== All matches ==
=== Singles matches ===
Tournament	Match	Round	Opponent	Rank	Result	Score
Medibank International; Sydney, Australia; WTA Tier II; Hard; 6–12 January 2008	–	1R	Bye			
Medibank International; Sydney, Australia; WTA Tier II; Hard; 6–12 January 2008	1	2R	(France) Virginie Razzano	#30	Win	6–1, 2–6, 7–5
Medibank International; Sydney, Australia; WTA Tier II; Hard; 6–12 January 2008	2	QF	(Slovenia) Katarina Srebotnik	#28	Win	6–3, 3–6, 6–2
Medibank International; Sydney, Australia; WTA Tier II; Hard; 6–12 January 2008	3	SF	(Belgium) Justine Henin (1)	#1	Loss	2–6, 6–2, 4–6
Australian Open; Melbourne, Australia; Grand Slam; Hard, outdoor 14–27 January 2008	4	1R	(Romania) Sorana Cîrstea	#106	Win	7–5, 6–3
Australian Open; Melbourne, Australia; Grand Slam; Hard, outdoor 14–27 January 2008	5	2R	(Italy) Tathiana Garbin	#40	Win	6–0, 6–3
Australian Open; Melbourne, Australia; Grand Slam; Hard, outdoor 14–27 January 2008	6	3R	(Slovenia) Katarina Srebotnik (28)	#27	Win	6–3, 6–4
Australian Open; Melbourne, Australia; Grand Slam; Hard, outdoor 14–27 January 2008	7	4R	(Denmark) Caroline Wozniacki	#64	Win	6–1, 7–6^{(7–2)}
Australian Open; Melbourne, Australia; Grand Slam; Hard, outdoor 14–27 January 2008	8	QF	(United States) Venus Williams (8)	#8	Win	7–6^{(7–3)}, 6–4
Australian Open; Melbourne, Australia; Grand Slam; Hard, outdoor 14–27 January 2008	9	SF	(Slovakia) Daniela Hantuchová (9)	#9	Win	0–6, 6–3, 6–4
Australian Open; Melbourne, Australia; Grand Slam; Hard, outdoor 14–27 January 2008	10	F	(Russia) Maria Sharapova (5)	#5	Loss	5–7, 3–6
Fed Cup Europe/Africa Zone; Budapest, Hungary; Carpet (i); 30 January – 2 February 2008	11	RR	(Poland) Urszula Radwańska	N/A	Win	6–3, 6–1
Fed Cup Europe/Africa Zone; Budapest, Hungary; Carpet (i); 30 January – 2 February 2008	12	RR	(Romania) Monica Niculescu	N/A	Win	5–7, 6–4, 7–5
Fed Cup Europe/Africa Zone; Budapest, Hungary; Carpet (i); 30 January – 2 February 2008	13	P-O	(Netherlands) Renée Reinhard	N/A	Win	6–2, 3–6, 6–3
Qatar Ladies Open; Doha, Qatar; WTA Tier I Hard; 18–24 February 2008	–	1R	Bye			
Qatar Ladies Open; Doha, Qatar; WTA Tier I Hard; 18–24 February 2008	14	2R	(Belarus) Olga Govortsova	#50	Win	6–3, 6–1
Qatar Ladies Open; Doha, Qatar; WTA Tier I Hard; 18–24 February 2008	–	3R	(Poland) Agnieszka Radwańska (16)	#20	Walkover	
Dubai Tennis Championships; Dubai, UAE; WTA Tier II; Hard; 25 February – 8 March 2008	–	1R	Bye			
Dubai Tennis Championships; Dubai, UAE; WTA Tier II; Hard; 25 February – 8 March 2008	15	2R	(Czech Republic) Nicole Vaidišová	#14	Win	6–4, 6–0
Dubai Tennis Championships; Dubai, UAE; WTA Tier II; Hard; 25 February – 8 March 2008	16	QF	(Russia) Elena Dementieva (8)	#11	Loss	7–5, 3–6, 3–6
Pacific Life Open; Indian Wells, California, USA; WTA Tier I Hard; 10–23 March 2008	–	1R	Bye			
Pacific Life Open; Indian Wells, California, USA; WTA Tier I Hard; 10–23 March 2008	17	2R	(Romania) Raluca Olaru	#77	Win	6–1, 5–7, 6–0
Pacific Life Open; Indian Wells, California, USA; WTA Tier I Hard; 10–23 March 2008	18	3R	(Italy) Tathiana Garbin (31)	#45	Win	6–3, 6–0
Pacific Life Open; Indian Wells, California, USA; WTA Tier I Hard; 10–23 March 2008	19	4R	(Italy) Francesca Schiavone (13)	#22	Win	2–6, 7–5, 6–2
Pacific Life Open; Indian Wells, California, USA; WTA Tier I Hard; 10–23 March 2008	20	QF	(Russia) Vera Zvonareva (12)	#21	Win	6–1, 6–4
Pacific Life Open; Indian Wells, California, USA; WTA Tier I Hard; 10–23 March 2008	21	SF	(Serbia) Jelena Janković (3)	#4	Win	7–6^{(7–3)}, 6–3
Pacific Life Open; Indian Wells, California, USA; WTA Tier I Hard; 10–23 March 2008	22	F	(Russia) Svetlana Kuznetsova (2)	#3	Win	6–4, 6–3
Sony Ericsson Open; Key Biscayne, Miami, USA; WTA Tier I Hard; 24 March – 6 April 2008	–	1R	Bye			
Sony Ericsson Open; Key Biscayne, Miami, USA; WTA Tier I Hard; 24 March – 6 April 2008	23	2R	(France) Émilie Loit	#93	Win	6–1, 6–2
Sony Ericsson Open; Key Biscayne, Miami, USA; WTA Tier I Hard; 24 March – 6 April 2008	24	3R	(United States) Lindsay Davenport (32)	#33	Loss	4–6, 2–6
Fed Cup World Group II Play-offs; Zagreb, Croatia; Hard (i); 26–27 April 2008	25	P-O	(Croatia) Nika Ožegović	N/A	Win	7–5, 6–1
Qatar Telecom German Open; Berlin, Germany; WTA Tier I Clay, Red; 5–11 May 2008	–	1R	Bye			
Qatar Telecom German Open; Berlin, Germany; WTA Tier I Clay, Red; 5–11 May 2008	26	2R	(Uzbekistan) Akgul Amanmuradova (LL)	#65	Win	7–6^{(7–0)}, 6–2
Qatar Telecom German Open; Berlin, Germany; WTA Tier I Clay, Red; 5–11 May 2008	27	3R	(Austria) Sybille Bammer	#23	Win	7–5, 4–6, 6–4
Qatar Telecom German Open; Berlin, Germany; WTA Tier I Clay, Red; 5–11 May 2008	28	QF	(Hungary) Ágnes Szávay (10)	#14	Win	3–6, 6–4, 6–3
Qatar Telecom German Open; Berlin, Germany; WTA Tier I Clay, Red; 5–11 May 2008	29	SF	(Russia) Elena Dementieva (7)	#9	Loss	2–6, 5–7
Internazionali BNL d'Italia; Rome, Italy; WTA Tier I Clay, Red; 12–18 May 2008	–	1R	Bye			
Internazionali BNL d'Italia; Rome, Italy; WTA Tier I Clay, Red; 12–18 May 2008	30	2R	(Bulgaria) Tsvetana Pironkova (Q)	#64	Loss	4–6, 7–5, 2–6
French Open; Paris, France; Grand Slam; Clay, Red; 26 May – 8 June 2008	31	1R	(Sweden) Sofia Arvidsson	#52	Win	6–2, 7–5
French Open; Paris, France; Grand Slam; Clay, Red; 26 May – 8 June 2008	32	2R	(Czech Republic) Lucie Šafářová	#41	Win	6–1, 6–2
French Open; Paris, France; Grand Slam; Clay, Red; 26 May – 8 June 2008	33	3R	(Denmark) Caroline Wozniacki (30)	#34	Win	6–4, 6–1
French Open; Paris, France; Grand Slam; Clay, Red; 26 May – 8 June 2008	34	4R	(France) Petra Cetkovská	#77	Win	6–0, 6–0
French Open; Paris, France; Grand Slam; Clay, Red; 26 May – 8 June 2008	35	QF	(Switzerland) Patty Schnyder (10)	#11	Win	6–3, 6–2
French Open; Paris, France; Grand Slam; Clay, Red; 26 May – 8 June 2008	36	SF	(Serbia) Jelena Janković (3)	#3	Win	6–4, 3–6, 6–4
French Open; Paris, France; Grand Slam; Clay, Red; 26 May – 8 June 2008	37	F	(Russia) Dinara Safina (13)	#14	Win	6–4, 6–3
Wimbledon; London, United Kingdom; Grand Slam; Grass; 23 June – 6 July 2008	38	1R	(Paraguay) Rossana de los Ríos	#103	Win	6–1, 6–2
Wimbledon; London, United Kingdom; Grand Slam; Grass; 23 June – 6 July 2008	39	2R	(France) Nathalie Dechy	#97	Win	6–7^{(2–7)}, 7–6^{(7–3)}, 10–8
Wimbledon; London, United Kingdom; Grand Slam; Grass; 23 June – 6 July 2008	40	3R	(China) Jie Zheng (WC)	#133	Loss	1–6, 4–6
Rogers Cup; Montreal, Canada; WTA Tier I Hard; 26 July – 3 August 2008	–	1R	Bye			
Rogers Cup; Montreal, Canada; WTA Tier I Hard; 26 July – 3 August 2008	41	2R	(Czech Republic) Petra Kvitová	#64	Win	6–3, 4–6, 6–3
Rogers Cup; Montreal, Canada; WTA Tier I Hard; 26 July – 3 August 2008	42	3R	(Austria) Tamira Paszek	#94	Loss	2–6, 6–1, 2–6
US Open; New York City, United States; Grand Slam; Hard, outdoor 25 August – 7 September 2008	43	1R	(Russia) Vera Dushevina	#57	Win	6–1, 4–6, 6–4
US Open; New York City, United States; Grand Slam; Hard, outdoor 25 August – 7 September 2008	44	2R	(France) Julie Coin (Q)	#188	Loss	3–6, 6–4, 3–6
Toray Pan Pacific Open; Tokyo, Japan; WTA Tier I Hard; 15–21 September 2008	–	1R	Bye			
Toray Pan Pacific Open; Tokyo, Japan; WTA Tier I Hard; 15–21 September 2008	45	2R	(Russia) Nadia Petrova	#20	Loss	1–6, 6–1, 2–6
China Open; Beijing, China; WTA Tier II; Hard; 22–28 September 2008	–	1R	Bye			
China Open; Beijing, China; WTA Tier II; Hard; 22–28 September 2008	46	2R	(France) Alizé Cornet	#19	Win	6–1, 7–6^{(7–1)}
China Open; Beijing, China; WTA Tier II; Hard; 22–28 September 2008	47	QF	(China) Jie Zheng	#30	Loss	6–7^{(4–7)}, 6–2, 4–6
Kremlin Cup; Moscow, Russia; WTA Tier I Hard (i); 6–12 October 2008	–	1R	Bye			
Kremlin Cup; Moscow, Russia; WTA Tier I Hard (i); 6–12 October 2008	48	2R	(Slovakia) Dominika Cibulková	#48	Loss	6–3, 2–6, 6–7^{(4–7)}
Zurich Open; Zurich, Switzerland; WTA Tier II; Hard (i); 11–19 October 2008	–	1R	Bye			
Zurich Open; Zurich, Switzerland; WTA Tier II; Hard (i); 11–19 October 2008	49	2R	(France) Marion Bartoli	#16	Win	6–2, 6–4
Zurich Open; Zurich, Switzerland; WTA Tier II; Hard (i); 11–19 October 2008	50	QF	(Czech Republic) Petra Kvitová (Q)	#57	Win	6–1, 6–4
Zurich Open; Zurich, Switzerland; WTA Tier II; Hard (i); 11–19 October 2008	51	SF	(United States) Venus Williams (3)	#9	Loss	6–4, 3–6, 4–6
Generali Ladies Linz; Linz, Austria; WTA Tier II; Hard (i); 20–26 October 2008	–	1R	Bye			
Generali Ladies Linz; Linz, Austria; WTA Tier II; Hard (i); 20–26 October 2008	52	2R	(Austria) Sybille Bammer	#26	Win	6–4, 6–2
Generali Ladies Linz; Linz, Austria; WTA Tier II; Hard (i); 20–26 October 2008	53	QF	(Italy) Flavia Pennetta (7)	#14	Win	6–4, 6–4
Generali Ladies Linz; Linz, Austria; WTA Tier II; Hard (i); 20–26 October 2008	54	SF	(Poland) Agnieszka Radwańska (3)	#10	Win	6–2, 3–6, 7–5
Generali Ladies Linz; Linz, Austria; WTA Tier II; Hard (i); 20–26 October 2008	55	F	(Russia) Vera Zvonareva (2)	#9	Win	6–2, 6–1
WTA Tour Championships; Doha, Qatar; Year-End Championship; Hard, indoor 4–10 November 2008	56	RR	(Serbia) Jelena Janković (1)	#1	Loss	3–6, 4–6
WTA Tour Championships; Doha, Qatar; Year-End Championship; Hard, indoor 4–10 November 2008	57	RR	(Russia) Vera Zvonareva (8)	#9	Loss	3–6, 7–6^{(7–5)}, 4–6

=== Doubles matches ===
Tournament	Match	Round	Partner	Opponents	Rank	Result	Score
Fed Cup Europe/Africa Zone; Budapest, Hungary; Carpet (i); 30 January – 2 February 2008	1	RR	(Serbia) Jelena Janković	(Romania) Sorana Cîrstea (Romania) Monica Niculescu	N/A	Win	2–6, 7–6^{(7–3)}, 7–6^{(7–2)}
Kremlin Cup; Moscow, Russia; WTA Tier I Hard (i); 6–12 October 2008	2	1R	(Italy) Francesca Schiavone	(Spain) Nuria Llagostera Vives (Russia) Elena Vesnina	#51	Win	7–6^{(7–1)}, 6–7^{(5–7)}, [10–5]
Kremlin Cup; Moscow, Russia; WTA Tier I Hard (i); 6–12 October 2008	3	QF	(Italy) Francesca Schiavone	(Zimbabwe) Cara Black (United States) Liezel Huber (1)	#1 #1	Loss	2–6, 6–4, [7–10]

=== Exhibitions ===
Tournament	Round	Opponent	Result	Score	Group
JB Group Classic; Hong Kong; Exhibition; Hard, outdoor January 2008
JB Group Classic; Hong Kong; Exhibition; Hard, outdoor January 2008	QF	(Russia) Elena Dementieva	Loss	4–6, 6–1, 3–6	Golden Group
JB Group Classic; Hong Kong; Exhibition; Hard, outdoor January 2008	SF	(China) Shuai Peng	Loss	1–6, 3–6	Silver Group

== Tournament schedule ==
=== Singles schedule ===
Ivanovic's 2008 singles tournament schedule is as follows:

Date	Championship	Location	Category	Surface	Points	Outcome
6 January – 12 January	Medibank International	Sydney (AUS)	WTA Tier II	Hard	250	Semifinals lost to (Belgium) Justine Henin, 2–6, 6–2, 4–6
14 January – 27 January	Australian Open	Melbourne (AUS)	Grand Slam	Hard	1400	Final lost to (Russia) Maria Sharapova, 5–7, 3–6
30 January – 2 February	Fed Cup Europe/Africa Zone, Zone Group I – Play-offs	Budapest (HUN)	Fed Cup	Carpet (i)	–	Serbia def. Netherlands, 2–1; SRB advanced to WG II Play-offs vs. Croatia
18 February – 24 February	Qatar Ladies Open	Doha (QAT)	WTA Tier I	Hard	130	Third round withdrew before match against (Poland) Agnieszka Radwańska
25 February – 8 March	Dubai Tennis Championships	Dubai (UAE)	WTA Tier II	Hard	150	Quarterfinals lost to (Russia) Elena Dementieva, 7–5, 3–6, 3–6
10 March – 23 March	Pacific Life Open	Indian Wells (USA)	WTA Tier I	Hard	930	Winner defeated (Russia) Svetlana Kuznetsova, 6–4, 6–3
24 March – 6 April	Sony Ericsson Open	Miami (USA)	WTA Tier I	Hard	90	Third round lost to (United States) Lindsay Davenport, 4–6, 2–6
26 April – 27 April	Fed Cup WG II Play-offs: SRB vs. CRO	Zagreb (CRO)	Fed Cup	Hard (i)	–	Serbia def. Croatia, 3–2; SRB promoted to World Group II
5 May – 11 May	Qatar Telecom German Open	Berlin (GER)	WTA Tier I	Clay, Red	390	Semifinals lost to (Russia) Elena Dementieva, 2–6, 5–7
12 May – 18 May	Internazionali BNL d'Italia	Rome (ITA)	WTA Tier I	Clay, Red	2	Second round lost to (Bulgaria) Tsvetana Pironkova, 4–6, 7–5, 2–6
26 May – 8 June	French Open	Paris (FRA)	Grand Slam	Clay	2000	Winner defeated (Russia) Dinara Safina, 6–4, 6–3
23 June – 6 July	The Championships, Wimbledon	Wimbledon (GBR)	Grand Slam	Grass	180	Third round lost to (China) Jie Zheng, 1–6, 4–6
21 July – 27 July	East West Bank Classic	Los Angeles (USA)	WTA Tier II	Hard	0	Withdrew before tournament began due to thumb injury
26 July – 3 August	Rogers Cup	Toronto (CAN)	WTA Tier I	Hard	120	Third round lost to (Austria) Tamira Paszek, 2–6, 6–1, 2–6
10 August – 17 August	Summer Olympics	Beijing (CHN)	Olympic Games	Hard	0	Withdrew before tournament began due to thumb injury
25 August – 7 September	US Open	New York (USA)	Grand Slam	Hard	120	Second round lost to (France) Julie Coin, 3–6, 6–4, 3–6
15 September – 21 September	Toray Pan Pacific Open	Tokyo (JAP)	WTA Tier I	Hard	2	Second round lost to (Russia) Nadia Petrova, 1–6, 6–1, 2–6
22 September – 28 September	China Open	Beijing (CHN)	WTA Tier II	Hard	140	Quarterfinals lost to (China) Jie Zheng, 6–7^{(4–7)}, 6–2, 4–6
6 October – 12 October	Kremlin Cup	Moscow (RUS)	WTA Tier I	Hard (i)	2	Second round lost to (Slovakia) Dominika Cibulková, 6–3, 2–6, 6–7^{(4–7)}
11 October – 19 October	Zurich Open	Zurich (SUI)	WTA Tier II	Hard	250	Semifinals lost to (United States) Venus Williams, 6–4, 3–6, 4–6
20 October – 26 October	Generali Ladies Linz	Linz (AUT)	WTA Tier II	Hard	550	Winner defeated (Russia) Vera Zvonareva, 6–2, 6–1
4 November – 10 November	WTA Tour Championships	Doha (QTR)	Year End Championships	Hard (i)	210	Round robin withdrew due to a virus before 3rd match
Total year-end points					6916	

=== Doubles schedule ===
Ivanovic's 2008 doubles tournament schedule is as follows:

Date	Championship	Location	Category	Partner	Surface	Points	Outcome
30 January – 2 February	Fed Cup Europe/Africa Zone, Zone Group I – Play-offs	Budapest (HUN)	Fed Cup	(Serbia) Jelena Janković	Carpet (i)	–	Serbia def. Netherlands, 2–1; SRB advanced to WG II Play-offs vs. Croatia
6 October – 12 October	Kremlin Cup	Moscow (RUS)	WTA Tier I	(Italy) Francesca Schiavone	Hard (i)	220	Quarterfinals lost to (Zimbabwe) Black/ (United States) Huber, 2–6, 6–4, [7–10]
Total year-end points						220	

== Yearly records ==
=== Head-to-head matchups ===
Ordered by percentage of wins

- (Austria) Sybille Bammer 2–0
- (Italy) Tathiana Garbin 2–0
- (Czech Republic) Petra Kvitová 2–0
- (Slovenia) Katarina Srebotnik 2–0
- (Denmark) Caroline Wozniacki 2–0
- (Uzbekistan) Akgul Amanmuradova 1–0
- (Sweden) Sofia Arvidsson 1–0
- (France) Marion Bartoli 1–0
- (Czech Republic) Petra Cetkovská 1–0
- (Romania) Sorana Cîrstea 1–0
- (France) Alizé Cornet 1–0
- (Paraguay) Rossana de los Ríos 1–0
- (France) Nathalie Dechy 1–0
- (Russia) Vera Dushevina 1–0
- (Belarus) Olga Govortsova 1–0
- (Slovakia) Daniela Hantuchová 1–0
- (Russia) Svetlana Kuznetsova 1–0
- (France) Émilie Loit 1–0
- (Romania) Raluca Olaru 1–0
- (Italy) Flavia Pennetta 1–0
- (Poland) Agnieszka Radwańska 1–0
- (France) Virginie Razzano 1–0
- (Czech Republic) Lucie Šafářová 1–0
- (Russia) Dinara Safina 1–0
- (Italy) Francesca Schiavone 1–0
- (Switzerland) Patty Schnyder 1–0
- (Hungary) Ágnes Szávay 1–0
- (Czech Republic) Nicole Vaidisová 1–0
- (Serbia) Jelena Janković 2–1
- (Russia) Vera Zvonareva 2–1
- (United States) Venus Williams 1–1
- (Slovakia) Dominika Cibulková 0–1
- (France) Julie Coin 0–1
- (United States) Lindsay Davenport 0–1
- (Belgium) Justine Henin 0–1
- (Austria) Tamira Paszek 0–1
- (Russia) Nadia Petrova 0–1
- (Bulgaria) Tsvetana Pironkova 0–1
- (Russia) Maria Sharapova 0–1
- (Russia) Elena Dementieva 0–2
- (China) Jie Zheng 0–2

=== Finals ===
==== Singles: 4 (3–1) ====
Legend Grand Slam (1–1) WTA Tier I (1–0) WTA Tier II (1–0)	Finals by surface Hard (2–1) Clay (1–0) Grass (0–0)	Finals by venue Outdoors (2–1) Indoors (1–0)

Outcome	No.	Date	Championship	Surface	Opponent in the final	Score in the final
Runner-up	3.	January 26, 2008	Australian Open, Melbourne, Australia	Hard	(Russia) Maria Sharapova	5–7, 3–6
Winner	6.	March 23, 2008	Indian Wells Masters, Indian Wells, US	Hard	(Russia) Svetlana Kuznetsova	6–4, 6–3
Winner	7.	June 7, 2008	French Open, Paris, France	Clay	(Russia) Dinara Safina	6–4, 6–3
Winner	8.	October 26, 2008	Linz Open, Linz, Austria	Hard (i)	(Russia) Vera Zvonareva	6–2, 6–1

=== Earnings ===
#	Event	Prize money	Year-to-date
1	Medibank International	$26,700	$26,700
2	Australian Open	$572,540	$599,240
3	Qatar Ladies Open	$27,900	$627,140
4	Dubai Tennis Championships	$37,550	$664,690
5	Pacific Life Open	$332,000	$996,690
6	Sony Ericsson Open	$20,400	$1,017,090
7	Qatar Telecom German Open	$51,000	$1,068,090
8	Internazionali BNL d'Italia	$6,590	$1,074,680
9	French Open	$1,390,178	$2,464,858
10	Wimbledon	$56,298	$2,521,156
11	Rogers Cup	$13,000	$2,534,156
12	US Open	$29,519	$2,563,675
13	Toray Pan Pacific Open	$16,370	$2,580,045
14	China Open	$14,600	$2,594,645
15	Kremlin Cup	$16,370	$2,611,015
15	Kremlin Cup (doubles)	$4,575	$2,615,590
16	Zurich Open	$27,300	$2,642,890
17	Generali Ladies Linz	$95,500	$2,738,390
18	WTA Tour Championships	$100,000	$2,838,390
+	Bonus pool	$281,250	$3,119,640
			$3,119,640

Figures in United States dollars (USD) unless noted.

=== Wins over Top 10s ===
Season	2008
Wins	7

#	Player	Rank	Event	Surface	Round	Score	IR
20.	(United States) Venus Williams	No. 8	Australian Open, Melbourne, Australia	Hard	Quarterfinals	7–6^{(7–3)}, 6–4	3
21.	(Slovakia) Daniela Hantuchová	No. 9	Australian Open, Melbourne, Australia	Hard	Semifinals	0–6, 6–3, 6–4	3
22.	(Serbia) Jelena Janković	No. 4	Indian Wells, US	Hard	Semifinals	7–6^{(7–3)}, 6–3	2
23.	(Russia) Svetlana Kuznetsova	No. 3	Indian Wells, US	Hard	Final	6–4, 6–3	2
24.	(Serbia) Jelena Janković	No. 3	French Open, Paris, France	Clay	Semifinals	6–4, 3–6, 6–4	2
25.	(Poland) Agnieszka Radwańska	No. 10	Linz, Austria	Hard (i)	Semifinals	6–2, 3–6, 7–5	4
26.	(Russia) Vera Zvonareva	No. 9	Linz, Austria	Hard (i)	Final	6–2, 6–1	4
