= 2007 WTA Tier I Series =

Women's professional tennis tour

Details
- Duration: January 29 – October 21
- Edition: 18th
- Tournaments: 10

Achievements (singles)
- Most titles: (Belgium) Justine Henin (Serbia) Jelena Janković (2)
- Most finals: (Belgium) Justine Henin (Serbia) Jelena Janković (3)

The WTA Tier I tournaments are part of the elite tour for professional women's tennis organised by the WTA called the WTA Tour.

== Tournaments ==
| Tournament | Country | Location | Surface | Date | Prize money |
|---|---|---|---|---|---|
| Toray Pan Pacific Open | Japan | Tokyo | Carpet (i) | Jan 29 – Feb 4 | $1,340,000 |
| Pacific Life Open | United States | Indian Wells | Hard | Mar 5–18 | $2,100,000 |
| Sony Ericsson Open | United States | Key Biscayne | Hard | Mar 19 – Apr 1 | $3,450,000 |
| Family Circle Cup | United States | Charleston | Clay (green) | Apr 9 – 15 | $1,340,000 |
| Qatar Telecom German Open | Germany | Berlin | Clay | May 7 – 13 | $1,340,000 |
| Internazionali BNL d'Italia | Italy | Rome | Clay | May 14 – 20 | $1,340,000 |
| Acura Classic | United States | San Diego | Hard | Jul 30 – Aug 5 | $1,340,000 |
| Rogers Cup | Canada | Toronto | Hard | Aug 13–19 | $1,340,000 |
| Kremlin Cup | Russia | Moscow | Hard (i) | Oct 8–14 | $1,340,000 |
| Zürich Open | Switzerland | Zürich | Hard (i) | Oct 15–21 | $1,340,000 |

== Results ==
* First-time champion

| Tournament | Singles champions | Runners-up | Score | Doubles champions | Runners-up | Score |
|---|---|---|---|---|---|---|
| Tokyo Singles – Doubles | (Switzerland) Martina Hingis | (Serbia) Ana Ivanovic | 6–4, 6–2 | (United States) Lisa Raymond (Australia) Samantha Stosur | (United States) Vania King (Australia) Rennae Stubbs | 7–6^{(8–6)}, 3–6, 7–5 |
| Indian Wells Singles – Doubles | (Slovakia) Daniela Hantuchová | (Russia) Svetlana Kuznetsova | 6–3, 6–4 | (United States) Lisa Raymond (2) (Australia) Samantha Stosur (2) | (Chinese Taipei) Chan Latisha (Chinese Taipei) Chuang Chia-jung | 6–3, 7–5 |
| Miami Singles – Doubles | (United States) Serena Williams | (Belgium) Justine Henin | 0–6, 7–5, 6–3 | (United States) Lisa Raymond (3) (Australia) Samantha Stosur (3) | (Zimbabwe) Cara Black (South Africa) Liezel Huber | 6–4, 3–6, [10–2] |
| Charleston Singles – Doubles | (Serbia) Jelena Janković* | (Russia) Dinara Safina | 6–2, 6–2 | (China) Yan Zi (China) Zheng Jie | (China) Peng Shuai (China) Sun Tiantian | 7–5, 6–0 |
| Berlin Singles – Doubles | (Serbia) Ana Ivanovic | (Russia) Svetlana Kuznetsova | 3–6, 6–4, 7–6^{(7–4)} | (United States) Lisa Raymond (4) (Australia) Samantha Stosur (4) | (Italy) Tathiana Garbin (Italy) Roberta Vinci | 6–3, 6–4 |
| Rome Singles – Doubles | (Serbia) Jelena Janković (2) | (Russia) Svetlana Kuznetsova | 7–5, 6–1 | (France) Nathalie Dechy* (Italy) Mara Santangelo* | (Italy) Tathiana Garbin (Italy) Roberta Vinci | 6–4, 6–1 |
| San Diego Singles – Doubles | (Russia) Maria Sharapova | (Switzerland) Patty Schnyder | 6–2, 3–6, 6–0 | (Zimbabwe) Cara Black (United States) Liezel Huber | (Belarus) Victoria Azarenka (Russia) Anna Chakvetadze | 7–5, 6–4 |
| Toronto Singles – Doubles | (Belgium) Justine Henin | (Serbia) Jelena Janković | 7–6^{(7–3)}, 7–5 | (Slovenia) Katarina Srebotnik* | (Zimbabwe) Cara Black (United States) Liezel Huber | 6–4, 2–6, [10–5] |
| Toronto Singles – Doubles | (Belgium) Justine Henin | (Serbia) Jelena Janković | 7–6^{(7–3)}, 7–5 | (Japan) Ai Sugiyama | (Zimbabwe) Cara Black (United States) Liezel Huber | 6–4, 2–6, [10–5] |
| Moscow Singles – Doubles | (Russia) Elena Dementieva | (United States) Serena Williams | 5–7, 6–1, 6–1 | (Zimbabwe) Cara Black (2) (United States) Liezel Huber (2) | (Belarus) Victoria Azarenka (Belarus) Tatiana Poutchek | 4–6, 6–1, [10–7] |
| Zürich Singles – Doubles | (Belgium) Justine Henin (2) | (France) Tatiana Golovin | 6–4, 6–4 | (Czech Republic) Květa Peschke (Australia) Rennae Stubbs | (United States) Lisa Raymond (Italy) Francesca Schiavone | 7–5, 7–6^{(7–1)} |

== Tournament details ==
=== Tokyo ===
| Tournament name | Toray Pan Pacific Open |
| Surface | Carpet |
| Location | Tokyo, Japan |
| Prize money | $1,340,000 |
| Singles (32 players) | Martina Hingis d. Ana Ivanovic, 6–4, 6–2 |
| Doubles (16 pairs) | Raymond/Stosur d. King/Stubbs, 7–6, 3–6, 7–5 |

==== Singles ====
Second round
1 | (Russia) M Sharapova | 6 | 2 | 6
(Italy) F Schiavone | 2 | 6 | 1
(Japan) A Sugiyama | 3 | 6 | 6
(Russia) M Kirilenko | 6 | 1 | 3
4 | (Serbia) J Janković | 6 | 6
(China) J Zheng | 4 | 0
(Italy) M Santangelo | 6 | 1 | 2
5 | (Serbia) A Ivanovic | 4 | 6 | 6
(Italy) R Vinci | 6 | 6
(France) S Brémond | 3 | 0
(Russia) E Likhovtseva | 3 | 5
3 | (Russia) E Dementieva | 6 | 7
6 | (China) N Li | 2 | 4
(Australia) S Stosur | 6 | 6
(Australia) N Pratt | 1 | 5
2 | (Switzerland) M Hingis | 6 | 7

Quarter-finals
1 | (Russia) M Sharapova | 4 | 6 | 6
(Japan) A Sugiyama | 6 | 0 | 1
4 | (Serbia) J Janković | 6 | 4 | 2
5 | (Serbia) A Ivanovic | 3 | 6 | 6
(Italy) R Vinci | 1 | 2
3 | (Russia) E Dementieva | 6 | 6
(Australia) S Stosur | 0 | 1
2 | (Switzerland) M Hingis | 6 | 6

Semi-finals
1 | (Russia) M Sharapova | 1 | 1 | r
5 | (Serbia) A Ivanovic | 6 | 0
3 | (Russia) E Dementieva | 4 | 3
2 | (Switzerland) M Hingis | 6 | 6

Final
5 | (Serbia) A Ivanovic | 4 | 2
2 | (Switzerland) M Hingis | 6 | 6

==== Doubles ====
Quarter-finals
1 | (United States) Raymond / (Australia) Stosur | 7 | 6
(Russia) Dementieva / (Ukraine) Savchuk | 5 | 2
(Serbia) Janković / (United States) Mattek | 6 | 3 | 3
(Argentina) Dulko / (United States) Tu | 2 | 6 | 6
(United States) King / (Australia) Stubbs | 6 | 2 | 6
3 | (Russia) Likhovtseva / (Russia) Vesnina | 4 | 6 | 3
(Russia) Dushevina / (Russia) Kirilenko | 1 | 1
2 | (China) Yan / (China) Zheng | 6 | 6

Semi-finals
1 | (United States) Raymond / (Australia) Stosur | 6 | 6
(Argentina) Dulko / (United States) Tu | 2 | 4
(United States) King / (Australia) Stubbs | 7 | 4 | 7^{7}
2 | (China) Yan / (China) Zheng | 5 | 6 | 6^{3}

Final
1 | (United States) Raymond / (Australia) Stosur | 7^{7} | 3 | 7
(United States) King / (Australia) Stubbs | 6 | 6 | 5

=== Indian Wells ===
| Tournament name | Pacific Life Open |
| Surface | Hardcourt |
| Location | Indian Wells, California, United States |
| Prize money | $2,100,000 |
| Singles (96 players) | Daniela Hantuchová d. Svetlana Kuznetsova, 6–3, 6–4 |
| Doubles (32 pairs) | Raymond/Stosur d. Chan YJ./Chuang CJ., 6–3 7–5 |

==== Singles ====
Fourth round
1 | (Russia) M Sharapova | 6 | 5 | 1
15 | (Russia) V Zvonareva | 4 | 7 | 6
12 | (China) N Li | 6 | 7
7 | (Serbia) J Janković | 3 | 6^{1}
3 | (Switzerland) M Hingis | 4 | 3
14 | (Slovakia) D Hantuchová | 6 | 6
11 | (Israel) S Pe'er | 6 | 7
8 | (Russia) A Chakvetadze | 4 | 6^{2}
33 | (Austria) S Bammer | 6 | 6 | 6
10 | (Serbia) A Ivanovic | 7 | 0 | 3
13 | (France) T Golovin | 6 | 1
4 | (Russia) N Petrova | 2 | 0 | r
6 | (Czech Republic) N Vaidišová | 4 | 6 | 6
17 | (France) M Bartoli | 6 | 3 | 2
16 | (Japan) A Sugiyama | 2 | 2
2 | (Russia) S Kuznetsova | 6 | 6

Quarter-finals
15 | (Russia) V Zvonareva | 4 | 5
12 | (China) N Li | 6 | 7
14 | (Slovakia) D Hantuchová | 6 | 5 | 7^{7}
11 | (Israel) S Pe'er | 2 | 7 | 6^{5}
33 | (Austria) S Bammer | 6 | 6
13 | (France) T Golovin | 2 | 3
6 | (Czech Republic) N Vaidišová | 6 | 3 | 4
2 | (Russia) S Kuznetsova | 4 | 6 | 6

Semi-finals
12 | (China) N Li | 5 | 6 | 1
14 | (Slovakia) D Hantuchová | 7 | 4 | 6
33 | (Austria) S Bammer | 7^{7} | 4 | 1
2 | (Russia) S Kuznetsova | 6^{5} | 6 | 6

Final
14 | (Slovakia) D Hantuchová | 6 | 6
2 | (Russia) S Kuznetsova | 3 | 4

Notes:

- Elena Dementieva (#5 seed) withdrew due to a rib injury.

==== Doubles ====
Quarter-finals
1 | (United States) Raymond / (Australia) Stosur | 6 | 6
8 | (United States) King / (Israel) Pe'er | 0 | 2
3 | (Spain) Ruano P. / (Argentina) Suárez | 6 | 4 | 6
(Czech Republic) Hradecká / (Czech Republic) Voráčová | 4 | 6 | 10
6 | (Russia) Likhovtseva / (Spain) Medina G. | 7^{7} | 3 | 7
4 | (France) Dechy / (Russia) Zvonareva | 6^{5} | 6 | 10
5 | (Chinese Taipei) Chan / (Chinese Taipei) Chuang | 6 | 6
2 | (China) Yan / (China) Zheng | 2 | 2

Semi-finals
1 | (United States) Raymond / (Australia) Stosur | 6 | 6
(Czech Republic) Hradecká / (Czech Republic) Voráčová | 2 | 3
4 | (France) Dechy / (Russia) Zvonareva | 4 | 4
5 | (Chinese Taipei) Chan / (Chinese Taipei) Chuang | 6 | 6

Final
1 | (United States) Raymond / (Australia) Stosur | 6 | 7
5 | (Chinese Taipei) Chan / (Chinese Taipei) Chuang | 3 | 5

=== Miami ===
| Tournament name | Sony Ericsson Open |
| Surface | Hardcourt |
| Location | Key Biscayne, Florida, United States |
| Prize money | $ 3,450,000 |
| Singles (96 players) | Serena Williams d. Justine Henin, 0–6, 7–5, 6–3 |
| Doubles (32 pairs) | Raymond/Stosur d. Black/Huber 6–4, 3–6, [10–2] |

==== Singles ====
Fourth round
1 | (Russia) M Sharapova | 1 | 1
13 | (United States) S Williams | 6 | 6
Q | (Russia) V Dushevina | 2 | 4
8 | (Czech Republic) N Vaidišová | 6 | 6
3 | (Russia) S Kuznetsova | 4 | 6 | 3
14 | (Israel) S Pe'er | 6 | 4 | 6
24 | (Italy) T Garbin | 6 | 6
(Poland) A Radwańska | 4 | 2
32 | (Italy) M Santangelo | 1 | 5
9 | (Russia) A Chakvetadze | 6 | 7
15 | (China) N Li | 4 | 6 | 6
4 | (Belgium) K Clijsters | 6 | 4 | 2
6 | (Russia) N Petrova | 3 | 6 | 6
10 | (Russia) D Safina | 6 | 2 | 4
18 | (Russia) V Zvonareva | 3 | 2
2 | (Belgium) J Henin | 6 | 6

Quarter-finals
13 | (United States) S Williams | 6 | 6
8 | (Czech Republic) N Vaidišová | 1 | 4
14 | (Israel) S Pe'er | 6 | 6
24 | (Italy) T Garbin | 0 | 3
9 | (Russia) A Chakvetadze | 4 | 7 | 6
15 | (China) N Li | 6' | 5 | 2
6 | (Russia) N Petrova | 6^{4} | 6^{4}
2 | (Belgium) J Henin | 7 | 7

Semi-finals
13 | (United States) S Williams | 7 | 6
14 | (Israel) S Pe'er | 6^{4} | 1
9 | (Russia) A Chakvetadze | 2 | 3
2 | (Belgium) J Henin | 6 | 6

Final
13 | (United States) S Williams | 0 | 7 | 6
2 | (Belgium) J Henin | 6 | 5 | 3

==== Doubles ====
Quarter-finals
1 | (United States) Raymond / (Australia) Stosur | 6 | 6
(France) Loit / (Australia) Pratt | 3 | 0
3 | (China) Yan / (China) Zheng | 4 | 4
8 | (Chinese Taipei) Chan / (Chinese Taipei) Chuang | 6 | 6
WC | (Slovakia) Hantuchová / (Switzerland) Hingis | 6 | 6
(Italy) Santangelo / (Australia) Stewart | 1 | 2
WC | (France) Golovin / (Russia) Safina | 4 | 3
2 | (Zimbabwe) Black / (South Africa) Huber | 6 | 6

Semi-finals
1 | (United States) Raymond / (Australia) Stosur | 6 | 6
8 | (Chinese Taipei) Chan / (Chinese Taipei) Chuang | 4 | 4
WC | (Slovakia) Hantuchová / (Switzerland) Hingis | 4 | 3
2 | (Zimbabwe) Black / (South Africa) Huber | 6 | 6

Final
1 | (United States) Raymond / (Australia) Stosur | 6 | 3 | 10
2 | (Zimbabwe) Black / (South Africa) Huber | 4 | 6 | 2

=== Charleston ===
| Tournament name | Family Circle Cup |
| Surface | Green Clay / Outdoors |
| Location | Charleston, South Carolina, United States |
| Prize money | $1,340,000 |
| Singles (56 players) | Jelena Janković d. Dinara Safina 6–2, 6–2 |
| Doubles (28 pairs) | Yan/Zheng d. Peng/Sun, 7–5, 6–0 |

==== Singles ====
Third round
(Netherlands) M Krajicek | 6^{4} | 6 | 6
15 | (Austria) S Bammer | 7^{7} | 2 | 1
9 | (Russia) V Zvonareva | 6 | 6
7 | (Serbia) A Ivanovic | 3 | 3
4 | (Russia) D Safina | 6 | 6
(Spain) L Domínguez Lino | 2 | 2
10 | (France) T Golovin | 6 | 4 | 6
(China) S Peng | 2 | 6 | 3
8 | (China) N Li | 4 | 5
(Spain) A Medina Garrigues | 6 | 7
(United States) V Williams | 6 | 6
(Chinese Taipei) Y-J Chan | 2 | 1
(China) J Zheng | 5 | 6^{5}
12 | (Slovenia) K Srebotnik | 7 | 7^{7}
16 | (Italy) M Santangelo | 3 | 0
2 | (Serbia) J Janković | 6 | 6

Quarter-finals
(Netherlands) M Krajicek | 1 | 5
9 | (Russia) V Zvonareva | 6 | 7
4 | (Russia) D Safina | 6
10 | (France) T Golovin | 3 | r
(Spain) A Medina Garrigues | 4 | 5
(United States) V Williams | 6 | 7
12 | (Slovenia) K Srebotnik | 2 | 0
2 | (Serbia) J Janković | 6 | 6

Semi-finals
9 | (Russia) V Zvonareva | 3 | 1 | r
4 | (Russia) D Safina | 6 | 0
(United States) V Williams | 6 | 3 | 6^{5}
2 | (Serbia) J Janković | 3 | 6 | 7^{7}

Final
4 | (Russia) D Safina | 2 | 2
2 | (Serbia) J Janković | 6 | 6

==== Doubles ====
Quarter-finals
(China) Peng / (China) Sun | w
8 | (France) Dechy / (Russia) Zvonareva | o
4 | (Russia) Safina / (Slovenia) Srebotnik | o
(Argentina) Dulko / (Italy) Pennetta | w
(Australia) Molik / (Italy) Santangelo | 6 | 3 | 1
3 | (China) Yan / (China) Zheng | 3 | 6 | 6
(Australia) Pratt / (Australia) Stewart | 0 | 3
2 | (Zimbabwe) Black / (South Africa) Huber | 6 | 6

Semi-finals
(China) Peng / (China) Sun | 4 | 7 | 6
(Argentina) Dulko / (Italy) Pennetta | 6 | 5 | 2
3 | (China) Yan / (China) Zheng | 6 | 6
2 | (Zimbabwe) Black / (South Africa) Huber | 0 | 4

Final
(China) Peng / (China) Sun | 5 | 0
3 | (China) Yan / (China) Zheng | 7 | 6

=== Berlin ===
| Tournament name | Qatar Telecom German Open |
| Surface | Red clay / Outdoors |
| Location | Berlin, Germany |
| Prize money | $1,340,000 |
| Singles (56 players) | Ana Ivanovic d. Svetlana Kuznetsova, 3–6, 6–4, 7–6 (4) |
| Doubles (28 pairs) | Raymond/Stosur d. Garbin/Vinci, 6–3, 6–4 |

==== Singles ====
Third round
1 | (Belgium) J Henin | 6 | 6
(Italy) ME Camerin | 1 | 3
(China) S Peng | 1 | 7 | 3r
5 | (Serbia) J Janković | 6 | 6^{3} | 2
3 | (Russia) S Kuznetsova | 6 | 6
(Germany) M Müller | 3 | 2
10 | (Russia) E Dementieva | 3 | 3
7 | (Russia) N Petrova | 6 | 6
(Ukraine) A Bondarenko | 3 | 0r
12 | (Serbia) A Ivanovic | 6 | 5
15 | (Switzerland) P Schnyder | 6 | 6
4 | (Switzerland) M Hingis | 4 | 0
8 | (Russia) D Safina | 3 | 6 | 6
(Czech Republic) L Šafářová | 6 | 3 | 2
(Ukraine) J Vakulenko | 2 | 6 | 6
2 | (France) A Mauresmo | 6 | 1 | 2

Quarter-finals
1 | (Belgium) J Henin | 3 | 6 | 6
5 | (Serbia) J Janković | 6 | 4 | 4
3 | (Russia) S Kuznetsova | 7 | 6
7 | (Russia) N Petrova | 6^{5} | 4
12 | (Serbia) A Ivanovic | 7 | 3 | 6
15 | (Switzerland) P Schnyder | 5 | 6 | 4
8 | (Russia) D Safina | 3 | 7 | 3
(Ukraine) J Vakulenko | 6 | 5 | 6

Semi-finals
1 | (Belgium) J Henin | 4 | 7 | 4
3 | (Russia) S Kuznetsova | 6 | 5 | 6
12 | (Serbia) A Ivanovic | 4
(Ukraine) J Vakulenko | 3r

Final
3 | (Russia) S Kuznetsova | 6 | 4 | 6^{4}
12 | (Serbia) A Ivanovic | 3 | 6 | 7

==== Doubles ====
Quarter-finals
1 | (United States) Raymond / (Australia) Stosur | 6 | 3 | 10
(Slovakia) Husárová / (United States) Shaughnessy | 2 | 6 | 6
(Russia) Kuznetsova / (Russia) Petrova
4 | (Czech Republic) Peschke / (Australia) Stubbs | w/o
(Italy) Garbin / (Italy) Vinci | 6 | 6
(United States) Granville / (Croatia) Kostanić Tošić | 3 | 3
5 | (Slovenia) Srebotnik / (Japan) Sugiyama | 6 | 4 | 7
2 | (Zimbabwe) Black / (South Africa) Huber | 0 | 6 | 10

Semi-finals
1 | (United States) Raymond / (Australia) Stosur | 6 | 6
4 | (Czech Republic) Peschke / (Australia) Stubbs | 2 | 2
(Italy) Garbin / (Italy) Vinci | 3 | 6 | 10
2 | (Zimbabwe) Black / (South Africa) Huber | 6 | 3 | 5

Final
1 | (United States) Raymond / (Australia) Stosur | 6 | 6
(Italy) Garbin / (Italy) Vinci | 3 | 4

=== Rome ===
| Tournament name | Internazionali BNL d'Italia |
| Surface | Red clay / Outdoors |
| Location | Rome, Italy |
| Prize money | $1,340,000 |
| Singles (56 players) | Jelena Janković d. Svetlana Kuznetsova, 7–5, 6–1 |
| Doubles (27 pairs) | Dechy/Santangelo d. Garbin/Vinci, 6–4, 6–1 |

==== Singles ====
Third round
(Australia) S Stosur | 4 | 4
14 | (Switzerland) P Schnyder | 6 | 6
11 | (Israel) S Pe'er | 3 | 3
8 | (United States) S Williams | 6 | 6
3 | (Serbia) J Janković | 6 | 7
(Ukraine) A Bondarenko | 4 | 5
10 | (Russia) E Dementieva | 4
5 | (Russia) N Petrova | 1 | r
7 | (Russia) A Chakvetadze | 2 | 3
9 | (Slovakia) D Hantuchová | 6 | 6
(Spain) A Medina Garrigues | 6 | 6
LL | (Italy) N Vierin | 1 | 1
6 | (Russia) D Safina | 6 | 6
Q | (Ukraine) K Bondarenko | 2 | 3
LL | (Ukraine) Y Fedak | 2 | 2
2 | (Russia) S Kuznetsova | 6 | 6

Quarter-finals
14 | (Switzerland) P Schnyder | 6 | 2 | 7
8 | (United States) S Williams | 3 | 6 | 6^{5}
3 | (Serbia) J Janković | 6 | 6
10 | (Russia) E Dementieva | 2 | 1
9 | (Slovakia) D Hantuchová | 7 | 7
(Spain) A Medina Garrigues | 6^{8} | 5
6 | (Russia) D Safina | 1 | 3
2 | (Russia) S Kuznetsova | 6 | 6

Semi-finals
14 | (Switzerland) P Schnyder | 1 | 3
3 | (Serbia) J Janković | 6 | 6
9 | (Slovakia) D Hantuchová | 4 | 2
2 | (Russia) S Kuznetsova | 6 | 6

Final
3 | (Serbia) J Janković | 7 | 6
2 | (Russia) S Kuznetsova | 5 | 1

==== Doubles ====
Quarter-finals
(Slovakia) J Husárová (United States) M Shaughnessy | 4 | 2
7 | (France) N Dechy (Italy) M Santangelo | 6 | 6
3 | (Czech Republic) K Peschke (Australia) R Stubbs | 6 | 3 | 12
5 | (China) T Sun (China) Z Yan | 3 | 6 | 10
(Czech Republic) I Benešová (Russia) G Voskoboeva | 7^{13} | 3 | 8
(Italy) T Garbin (Italy) R Vinci | 6^{11} | 6 | 10
(Italy) K Knapp (Italy) R Oprandi | 7 | 2 | 4
2 | (Zimbabwe) C Black (South Africa) L Huber | 5 | 6 | 10

Semi-finals
7 | (France) Nathalie Dechy (Italy) Mara Santangelo | 6 | 6
3 | (Czech Republic) Květa Peschke (Australia) Rennae Stubbs | 4 | 4
(Italy) Tathiana Garbin (Italy) Roberta Vinci | 6 | 6
(Zimbabwe) Cara Black (South Africa) Liezel Huber | 3 | 3

Final
7 | (France) Nathalie Dechy (Italy) Mara Santangelo | 6 | 6
(Italy) Tathiana Garbin (Italy) Roberta Vinci | 4 | 1

=== San Diego ===
| Tournament name | Acura Classic |
| Surface | Hardcourt / Outdoors |
| Location | San Diego, USA |
| Prize money | $1,340,000 |
| Singles (56 players) | Maria Sharapova d. Patty Schnyder, 6–2, 3–6, 6–0 |
| Doubles (28 pairs) | Black/Huber d. Azarenka/Chakvetadze, 7–5, 6–4 |

==== Singles ====
Third Round
1 | (Russia) M Sharapova | 6 | 6
13 | (France) T Golovin | 0 | 3
(India) S Mirza | 6 | 6
8 | (Russia) D Safina | 1 | 2
3 | (Russia) A Chakvetadze | 6 | 6
(Japan) A Sugiyama | 4 | 4
10 | (United States) V Williams | 6 | 6
6 | (Slovakia) D Hantuchová | 0 | 3
7 | (Switzerland) M Hingis | 1 | 7^{7} | 3
11 | (Switzerland) P Schnyder | 6 | 6^{4} | 6
(Slovenia) K Srebotnik | 3 | 6^{10}
4 | (Russia) N Petrova | 6 | 7^{12}
5 | (France) M Bartoli | 4 | 5
9 | (Russia) E Dementieva | 6 | 7
(Russia) M Kirilenko | 6 | 3 | 7
2 | (Serbia) J Janković | 2 | 6 | 5

Quarterfinals
1 | (Russia) M Sharapova | 6 | 6
(India) S Mirza | 2 | 1
3 | (Russia) A Chakvetadze | 6^{5} | 7^{7} | 6
10 | (United States) V Williams | 7^{7} | 6^{3} | 2
11 | (Switzerland) P Schnyder | 6 | 6
4 | (Russia) N Petrova | 4 | 4
9 | (Russia) E Dementieva | 6 | 6
(Russia) M Kirilenko | 2 | 4

Semifinals
1 | (Russia) M Sharapova | 6 | 6
3 | (Russia) A Chakvetadze | 3 | 2
11 | (Switzerland) P Schnyder | 7^{7} | 6
9 | (Russia) E Dementieva | 6^{4} | 0

Finals
1 | (Russia) M Sharapova | 6 | 3 | 6
11 | (Switzerland) P Schnyder | 2 | 6 | 0

==== Doubles ====
Quarter-finals
1 | (Zimbabwe) Black / (United States) Huber | 6 | 6
6 | (Colombia) Castaño / (Thailand) Tanasugarn | 3 | 3
3 | (Chinese Taipei) Chan / (Chinese Taipei) Chuang | 6 | 6
(United States) King / (China) Peng | 2 | 4
(Belarus) Azarenka / (Russia) Chakvetadze | 6 | 6
(France) Golovin / (Russia) Safina | 2 | 4
(Chinese Taipei) Hsieh / (Russia) Kudryavtseva | 3 | 4
2 | (Slovenia) Srebotnik / (Japan) Sugiyama | 6 | 6

Semi-finals
1 | (Zimbabwe) Black / (United States) Huber | 4 | 6 | 10
3 | (Chinese Taipei) Chan / (Chinese Taipei) Chuang | 6 | 4 | 5
(Belarus) Azarenka / (Russia) Chakvetadze | 6 | 3 | 10
2 | (Slovenia) Srebotnik / (Japan) Sugiyama | 2 | 6 | 6

Final
1 | (Zimbabwe) Black / (United States) Huber | 7 | 6
(Belarus) Azarenka / (Russia) Chakvetadze | 5 | 4

=== Toronto ===
| Tournament name | Rogers Cup |
| Surface | Hardcourt / Outdoors |
| Location | Toronto, Canada |
| Prize money | $1,340,000 |
| Singles (56 players) | Justine Henin d. Jelena Janković, 7–6 (3), 7–5 |
| Doubles (28 pairs) | Srebotnik/Sugiyama d. Black/Huber, 6–4, 2–6, [10–5] |

==== Singles ====
Third Round
1 | (Belgium) J Henin | 7 | 6
(China) S Peng | 5 | 2
10 | (Switzerland) P Schnyder | 4 | 1
6 | (Russia) N Petrova | 6 | 6
Q | (China) Z Yan | 6 | 5 | 7
(Greece) E Daniilidou | 3 | 7 | 6^{5}
9 | (Russia) D Safina | 2 | 7 | 0
7 | (France) M Bartoli | 6 | 6^{2} | 6
(Italy) F Schiavone | 2 | 0
12 | (France) T Golovin | 6 | 6
(United States) M Shaughnessy | 3 | 2
3 | (Russia) S Kuznetsova | 6 | 6
(France) V Razzano | 6 | 6
11 | (Israel) S Pe'er | 4 | 3
13 | (Austria) S Bammer | 2 | 3
2 | (Serbia) J Janković | 6 | 6

Quarterfinals
1 | (Belgium) J Henin | 7 | 6
6 | (Russia) N Petrova | 6^{4} | 3
Q | (China) Z Yan | 6 | 3
7 | (France) M Bartoli | 2 | 0 | r
12 | (France) T Golovin | 2 | 7 | 6
3 | (Russia) S Kuznetsova | 6 | 5 | 1
(France) V Razzano | 5 | 2
2 | (Serbia) J Janković | 7 | 6

Semifinals
1 | (Belgium) J Henin | 6 | 6
Q | (China) Z Yan | 3 | 0
12 | (France) T Golovin | 7 | 3 | 2
2 | (Serbia) J Janković | 5 | 6 | 6

Final
1 | (Belgium) J Henin | 7 | 7
2 | (Serbia) J Janković | 6^{3} | 5

==== Doubles ====
Quarter-finals
1 | (Zimbabwe) Black / (United States) Huber | 6 | 6
(France) Foretz / (Tunisia) Sfar | 1 | 4
4 | (France) Dechy / (China) Sun | w/o
8 | (Russia) Kuznetsova / (Russia) Petrova
(Italy) Camerin / (Argentina) Dulko | 4 | 3
3 | (Australia) Molik / (Italy) Santangelo | 6 | 6
6 | (China) Peng / (China) Yan | 1 | 5
2 | (Slovenia) Srebotnik / (Japan) Sugiyama | 6 | 7

Semi-finals
1 | (Zimbabwe) Black / (United States) Huber | 6 | 6
4 | (France) Dechy / (China) Sun | 2 | 3
3 | (Australia) Molik / (Italy) Santangelo | 2 | 3
2 | (Slovenia) Srebotnik / (Japan) Sugiyama | 6 | 6

Final
1 | (Zimbabwe) Black / (United States) Huber | 4 | 6 | 5
2 | (Slovenia) Srebotnik / (Japan) Sugiyama | 6 | 2 | 10

=== Moscow ===
| Tournament name | Kremlin Cup |
| Surface | Hard / Indoors |
| Location | Moscow, Russia |
| Prize money | $1,340,000 |
| Singles (32 players) | Elena Dementieva d. Serena Williams, 5–7, 6–1, 6–1 |
| Doubles (16 pairs) | Black/Huber d. Azarenka/Poutchek, 4–6, 6–1, [10–7] |

==== Singles ====
2nd Round
1 | (Russia) S Kuznetsova | 3 | 6 | 6
(Argentina) G Dulko | 6 | 2 | 4
WC | (Russia) V Dushevina | 2 | 6 | 6
5 | (France) M Bartoli | 6 | 0 | 4
4 | (United States) S Williams | 7 | 6
Q | (Ukraine) T Perebiynis | 5 | 4
WC | (Russia) E Vesnina | 3 | 4
8 | (Czech Republic) N Vaidišová | 6 | 6
(Russia) V Zvonareva | 6 | 6
(Poland) A Radwańska | 2 | 2
(Russia) D Safina | 7 | 6
3 | (Russia) A Chakvetadze | 6^{6} | 2
7 | (Switzerland) P Schnyder | 3 | 4
(Russia) E Dementieva | 6 | 6
(Belarus) V Azarenka | 7 | 6
2 | (Russia) M Sharapova | 6^{9} | 2

Quarterfinals
1 | (Russia) S Kuznetsova | 6 | 6
WC | (Russia) V Dushevina | 2 | 2
4 | (United States) S Williams | 6 | 7
8 | (Czech Republic) N Vaidišová | 4 | 6^{7}
(Russia) V Zvonareva | 2 | 6 | 3
(Russia) D Safina | 6 | 3 | 6
(Russia) E Dementieva | 7 | 6
(Belarus) V Azarenka | 6^{4} | 2

Semifinals
1 | (Russia) S Kuznetsova | 6^{2} | 1
4 | (United States) S Williams | 7 | 6
(Russia) D Safina | 1 | 0
(Russia) E Dementieva | 6 | 6

Final
4 | (United States) S Williams | 7 | 1 | 1
(Russia) E Dementieva | 5 | 6 | 6

==== Doubles ====
Quarter-finals
1 | (Zimbabwe) Black / (United States) Huber | 6 | 5 | 10
(India) Mirza / (Switzerland) Schnyder | 3 | 7 | 7
3 | (Russia) Likhovtseva / (Russia) Safina | 6 | 6
WC | (Russia) Jidkova / (Belarus) Kustova | 2 | 2
(Belarus) Azarenka / (Belarus) Poutchek | 6 | 6
(France) Loit / (United States) Tu | 3 | 3
(Czech Republic) Benešová / (Russia) Voskoboeva | 2 | 7 | 10
2 | (Czech Republic) Peschke / (Australia) Stubbs | 6 | 6^{1} | 8

Semi-finals
1 | (Zimbabwe) Black / (United States) Huber | 6 | 6
3 | (Russia) Likhovtseva / (Russia) Safina | 1 | 4
(Belarus) Azarenka / (Belarus) Poutchek | 6 | 1 | 10
(Czech Republic) Benešová / (Russia) Voskoboeva | 1 | 6 | 8

Final
1 | (Zimbabwe) Black / (United States) Huber | 4 | 6 | 10
(Belarus) Azarenka / (Belarus) Poutchek | 6 | 1 | 8

=== Zürich ===
| Tournament name | Zürich Open |
| Surface | Hardcourt / Indoors |
| Location | Zürich, Switzerland |
| Prize money | $1,340,000 |
| Singles (28 players) | Justine Henin d. Tatiana Golovin 6–4, 6–4 |
| Doubles (16 pairs) | |

==== Singles ====
2nd Round
1 | (Belgium) J Henin | 6 | 6
(Russia) V Zvonareva | 3 | 1
LL | (Poland) A Radwańska | 6 | 6
7 | (Slovakia) D Hantuchová | 3 | 3
3 | (Serbia) J Janković | 4 | 4
(Czech Republic) N Vaidišová | 6 | 6
(Ukraine) A Bondarenko | 2 | 6 | 6
8 | (France) A Mauresmo | 6 | 4 | 1
9 | (France) M Bartoli | 6 | 6
WC | (Netherlands) M Krajicek | 4 | 1
(France) T Golovin | 6 | 6
5 | (Serbia) A Ivanovic | 3 | 1
(Switzerland) P Schnyder | 6 | 3 | 4
(Italy) F Schiavone | 2 | 6 | 6
(Austria) S Bammer | 6 | 4 | 5
2 | (Russia) S Kuznetsova | 2 | 6 | 7

Quarterfinals
1 | (Belgium) J Henin | 6 | 6
LL | (Poland) A Radwańska | 4 | 2
(Czech Republic) N Vaidišová | 6 | 6
(Ukraine) A Bondarenko | 1 | 4
9 | (France) M Bartoli | 5r
(France) T Golovin | 4
(Italy) F Schiavone | 6 | 3
2 | (Russia) S Kuznetsova | 3 | 3r

Semifinals
1 | (Belgium) J Henin | 3 | 6 | 7
(Czech Republic) N Vaidišová | 6 | 3 | 5
(France) T Golovin | 6 | 6
(Italy) F Schiavone | 0 | 4

Final
1 | (Belgium) J Henin | 6 | 6
(France) T Golovin | 4 | 4

==== Doubles ====
Quarter-finals
1 | (Zimbabwe) Black / (United States) Huber | 6^{10} | 6 | 10
(Spain) Medina Garrigues / (Italy) Pennetta | 7 | 2 | 2
3 | (Chinese Taipei) Chan / (Chinese Taipei) Chuang | 1 | 5
(United States) Raymond / (Italy) Schiavone | 6 | 7
(China) Peng / (United States) Tu | 6 | 6
4 | (Australia) Molik / (Italy) Santangelo | 4 | 3
(Czech Republic) Peschke / (Australia) Stubbs | 6 | 5 | 10
2 | (Slovenia) Srebotnik / (Japan) Sugiyama | 4 | 7 | 8

Semi-finals
1 | (Zimbabwe) Black / (United States) Huber | 4 | 7 | 6
(United States) Raymond / (Italy) Schiavone | 6 | 5 | 10
(China) Peng / (United States) Tu | 4 | 3
(Czech Republic) Peschke / (Australia) Stubbs | 6 | 6

Final
(United States) Raymond / (Italy) Schiavone | 5 | 6^{1}
(Czech Republic) Peschke / (Australia) Stubbs | 7 | 7^{7}

== See also ==
- WTA Tier I tournaments
- 2007 WTA Tour
- 2007 ATP Masters Series
- 2007 ATP Tour
