= 2008 Zurich Open – Singles =

Singles
- 2008 Zurich Open

Final
- Champion: (United States) Venus Williams
- Runner-up: (Italy) Flavia Pennetta
- Score: 7–6^{(7–1)}, 6–2

Details
- Draw: 28
- Seeds: 8

Events
Singles	Doubles
← 2007 ·	Zurich Open

Justine Henin was the defending champion, but retired from the sport on May 14, 2008.

Venus Williams won in the final 7–6^{(7–1)}, 6–2, against Flavia Pennetta.

== Seeds ==
The top four seeds receive a bye into the second round.

1. (Serbia) Jelena Janković (second round)
2. (Serbia) Ana Ivanovic (semifinals)
3. (United States) Venus Williams (champion)
4. (Russia) Vera Zvonareva (second round, retired due to dizziness)
5. (Poland) Agnieszka Radwańska (second round)
6. (Switzerland) Patty Schnyder (first round)
7. (Russia) Anna Chakvetadze (first round)
8. (Slovakia) Daniela Hantuchová (first round)

== Draw ==
=== Key ===
- Q = Qualifier
- WC = Wild card
- LL = Lucky loser
- Alt = Alternate
- SE = Special exempt
- PR = Protected ranking
- ITF = ITF entry
- JE = Junior exempt
- w/o = Walkover
- r = Retired
- d = Defaulted
- SR = Special ranking

=== Finals ===
Semifinals
(Italy) Flavia Pennetta	6	7
(Spain) Anabel Medina Garrigues	3	6^{6}
3	(United States) Venus Williams	4	6	6
2	(Serbia) Ana Ivanovic	6	3	4

Final
(Italy) Flavia Pennetta	6^{1}	2
3	(United States) Venus Williams	7	6

=== Top half ===
First round
(Russia) N Petrova	1	1
(Italy) F Pennetta	6	6
(Slovenia) K Srebotnik	6	6
WC	(Switzerland) T Bacsinszky	3	3
Q	(Russia) V Dushevina	4	1
5	(Poland) A Radwańska	6	6
(Spain) A Medina Garrigues	6	6
WC	(China) N Li	2	4
(France) A Mauresmo	2	1
(Belarus) V Azarenka	6	6
Q	(Romania) M Niculescu	3	6	6
7	(Russia) A Chakvetadze	6	3	2

Second round
1	(Serbia) J Janković	7	3	3
(Italy) F Pennetta	5	6	6
(Slovenia) K Srebotnik	2	7	6
5	(Poland) A Radwańska	6	6^{6}	3
4/WC	(Russia) V Zvonareva	3	0	r
(Spain) A Medina Garrigues	6	3
(Belarus) V Azarenka	6	6
Q	(Romania) M Niculescu	0	0

Quarterfinals
(Italy) F Pennetta	7	6
(Slovenia) K Srebotnik	5	2
(Spain) A Medina Garrigues	4	6
(Belarus) V Azarenka	6	3	r

Semifinals
(Italy) F Pennetta	6	7
(Spain) A Medina Garrigues	3	6^{6}

=== Bottom half ===
First round
8	(Slovakia) D Hantuchová	5	2
(Russia) M Kirilenko	7	6
(Denmark) C Wozniacki	6^{3}	2
(Italy) F Schiavone	7	6
(Ukraine) A Bondarenko	1	6	7
(France) A Cornet	6	3	6^{6}
6	(Switzerland) P Schnyder	4	6	4
Q	(Czech Republic) P Kvitová	6	3	6
Q	(Sweden) S Arvidsson	0	7	6
(Austria) S Bammer	6	5	4
(France) M Bartoli	6	6
(Hungary) A Szávay	4	0

Second round
(Russia) M Kirilenko	3	5
(Italy) F Schiavone	6	7
(Ukraine) A Bondarenko	3	4
3	(United States) V Williams	6	6
Q	(Czech Republic) P Kvitová	6	6
Q	(Sweden) S Arvidsson	2	1
(France) M Bartoli	2	4
2	(Serbia) A Ivanovic	6	6

Quarterfinals
(Italy) F Schiavone	3	3
3	(United States) V Williams	6	6
Q	(Czech Republic) P Kvitová	1	4
2	(Serbia) A Ivanovic	6	6

Semifinals
3	(United States) V Williams	4	6	6
2	(Serbia) A Ivanovic	6	3	4
