= 2007 Zurich Open =

- Date: 15–21 October
- Edition: 24th
- Category: Tier I
- Draw: 28S (32Q) / 16D
- Prize money: $1,340,000
- Surface: Hard / indoor
- Location: Zürich, Switzerland
- Venue: Hallenstadion

Champions

Singles
- (Belgium) Justine Henin

Doubles
- (Czech Republic) Květa Peschke / (Australia) Rennae Stubbs
← 2006 ·	Zurich Open	· 2008 →

2007 Zurich Open was a Tier I tennis event on the 2007 WTA Tour.

Justine Henin won the singles title, which was her second title here, the first coming in 2003. Tatiana Golovin reached her first Tier I tournament final.

== Finals ==
=== Singles ===
(Belgium) Justine Henin defeated (France) Tatiana Golovin, 6–4, 6-4

=== Doubles ===
(Czech Republic) Květa Peschke / (Australia) Rennae Stubbs defeated (United States) Lisa Raymond / (Italy) Francesca Schiavone, 7–5, 7-6^{(7–1)}
