= 2008 Zurich Open – Doubles =

Doubles
- 2008 Zurich Open

Final
- Champions: (Zimbabwe) Cara Black (United States) Liezel Huber
- Runners-up: (Germany) Anna-Lena Grönefeld (Switzerland) Patty Schnyder
- Score: 6–1, 7–6^{(7–3)}

Details
- Draw: 16
- Seeds: 4

Events
Singles	Doubles
← 2007 ·	Zurich Open

Květa Peschke and Rennae Stubbs were the defending champions, but lost in the first round to Anna-Lena Grönefeld and Patty Schnyder.

Cara Black and Liezel Huber won in the final 6–1, 7–6^{(7–3)}, against Anna-Lena Grönefeld and Patty Schnyder.

== Seeds ==
1. (Zimbabwe) Cara Black / (United States) Liezel Huber (champions)
2. (Slovenia) Katarina Srebotnik / (Japan) Ai Sugiyama (semifinals)
3. (Spain) Anabel Medina Garrigues / (Spain) Virginia Ruano Pascual (first round)
4. (Czech Republic) Květa Peschke / (Australia) Rennae Stubbs (first round)

== Draw ==
Key

- Q = Qualifier
- WC = Wild card
- LL = Lucky loser
- Alt = Alternate
- ITF = ITF entry
- PR = Protected ranking
- SR = Special ranking
- SE = Special exempt
- JE = Junior exempt
- JR = Junior Accelerator Programme entrant
- CO = College Accelerator Programme entrant
- NG = Next Gen Accelerator Program entrant
- w/o = Walkover
- r = Retired
- d = Defaulted

=== Draw ===
First round
1	(Zimbabwe) C Black (United States) L Huber	6	6
WC	(Slovakia) D Hantuchová (Hungary) Á Szávay	2	3
(Czech Republic) I Benešová (United States) J Craybas	4	0
(Belarus) V Azarenka (Russia) N Petrova	6	6
3	(Spain) A Medina Garrigues (Spain) V Ruano Pascual	2	4
(Romania) S Cîrstea (Romania) M Niculescu	6	6
(Czech Republic) E Hrdinová (Czech Republic) V Uhlířová	4	2
(Russia) M Kirilenko (Italy) F Pennetta	6	6
(United States) L Raymond (Australia) S Stosur	3	6^{1}
(China) S Peng (China) J Zheng	6	7
WC	(Germany) A-L Grönefeld (Switzerland) P Schnyder	3	6	[12]
4	(Czech Republic) K Peschke (Australia) R Stubbs	6	4	[10]
(Spain) N Llagostera Vives (Spain) MJ Martínez Sánchez	1	2
(Poland) K Jans (Poland) A Rosolska	6	6
(Ukraine) A Bondarenko (Ukraine) K Bondarenko	1	4
2	(Slovenia) K Srebotnik (Japan) A Sugiyama	6	6

Quarterfinals
1	(Zimbabwe) C Black (United States) L Huber	w/o
(Belarus) V Azarenka (Russia) N Petrova
(Romania) S Cîrstea (Romania) M Niculescu	6	2	[6]
(Russia) M Kirilenko (Italy) F Pennetta	2	6	[10]
(China) S Peng (China) J Zheng	6^{7}	3
WC	(Germany) A-L Grönefeld (Switzerland) P Schnyder	7	6
(Poland) K Jans (Poland) A Rosolska	6	3	[6]
2	(Slovenia) K Srebotnik (Japan) A Sugiyama	2	6	[10]

Semifinals
1	(Zimbabwe) C Black (United States) L Huber	6	4	[10]
(Russia) M Kirilenko (Italy) F Pennetta	2	6	[6]
WC	(Germany) A-L Grönefeld (Switzerland) P Schnyder	6	0	[10]
2	(Slovenia) K Srebotnik (Japan) A Sugiyama	4	6	[8]

Final
1	(Zimbabwe) C Black (United States) L Huber	6	7
WC	(Germany) A-L Grönefeld (Switzerland) P Schnyder	1	6^{3}
