= List of Grand Slam singles champions in Open Era with age of first title =

This is a list of all Open Era tennis Grand Slam singles champions and how old they were when they won their first title. Players who won a title before the Open Era are designated with an asterisk (*), but those results do not factor into these lists.

== Men ==
Age	Name	Tournament	Date of birth	Date of first title	Notes
33 years, 220 days	(Australia) Ken Rosewall *	1968 French Open	2 November 1934	9 June 1968	1st of 4
29 years, 332 days	(Australia) Rod Laver *	1968 Wimbledon	9 August 1938	6 July 1968	1st of 5
25 years, 60 days	(United States) Arthur Ashe	1968 US Open	10 July 1943	8 September 1968	1st of 3
24 years, 98 days	(Czechoslovakia) Jan Kodeš	1970 French Open	1 March 1946	7 June 1970	1st of 3
26 years, 42 days	(Australia) John Newcombe *	1970 Wimbledon	23 May 1944	4 July 1970	1st of 5
24 years, 241 days	(United States) Stan Smith	1971 US Open	14 December 1946	12 August 1971	1st of 2
34 years, 306 days	(Spain) Andrés Gimeno	1972 French Open	3 August 1937	4 June 1972	
26 years, 53 days	(Romania) Ilie Năstase	1972 US Open	19 July 1946	10 September 1972	1st of 2
21 years, 121 days	(United States) Jimmy Connors	1974 Australian Open	2 September 1952	1 January 1974	1st of 8
18 years, 10 days	(Sweden) Björn Borg	1974 French Open	6 June 1956	16 June 1974	1st of 11
26 years, 214 days	(Spain) Manuel Orantes	1975 US Open	5 February 1949	7 September 1975	
21 years, 195 days	(Australia) Mark Edmondson	1976 Australian Open	24 June 1954	5 January 1976	
25 years, 340 days	(Italy) Adriano Panatta	1976 French Open	9 July 1950	14 June 1976	
25 years, 87 days	(United States) Roscoe Tanner	1977 Australian Open (January)	15 October 1951	10 January 1977	
24 years, 292 days	(Argentina) Guillermo Vilas	1977 French Open	17 August 1952	5 June 1977	1st of 4
23 years, 159 days	(United States) Vitas Gerulaitis	1977 Australian Open (December)	26 July 1954	1 January 1978	
20 years, 205 days	(United States) John McEnroe	1979 US Open	16 February 1959	9 September 1979	1st of 7
26 years, 13 days	(United States) Brian Teacher	1980 Australian Open	23 December 1954	5 January 1981	
23 years, 273 days	(South Africa) Johan Kriek	1981 Australian Open	5 April 1958	2 January 1982	1st of 2
17 years, 293 days	(Sweden) Mats Wilander	1982 French Open	22 August 1964	11 June 1982	1st of 7
23 years, 29 days	(France) Yannick Noah	1983 French Open	18 May 1960	16 June 1983	
24 years, 97 days	(Czechoslovakia) Ivan Lendl	1984 French Open	7 March 1960	12 June 1984	1st of 8
19 years, 324 days	(Sweden) Stefan Edberg	1985 Australian Open	19 January 1966	9 December 1985	1st of 6
17 years, 228 days	(West Germany) Boris Becker	1985 Wimbledon	22 November 1967	8 July 1985	1st of 6
22 years, 40 days	(Australia) Pat Cash	1987 Wimbledon	27 May 1965	6 July 1987	
17 years, 110 days	(United States) Michael Chang	1989 French Open	22 February 1972	12 June 1989	
30 years, 103 days	(Ecuador) Andrés Gómez	1990 French Open	27 February 1960	10 June 1990	
19 years, 29 days	(United States) Pete Sampras	1990 US Open	12 August 1971	10 September 1990	1st of 14
20 years, 297 days	(United States) Jim Courier	1991 French Open	17 August 1970	10 June 1991	1st of 4
22 years, 263 days	(Germany) Michael Stich	1991 Wimbledon	18 October 1968	8 July 1991	
22 years, 68 days	(United States) Andre Agassi	1992 Wimbledon	29 April 1970	6 July 1992	1st of 8
22 years, 142 days	(Spain) Sergi Bruguera	1993 French Open	16 January 1971	7 June 1993	1st of 2
27 years, 253 days	(Austria) Thomas Muster	1995 French Open	2 October 1967	12 June 1995	
22 years, 113 days	(Russia) Yevgeny Kafelnikov	1996 French Open	18 February 1974	10 June 1996	1st of 2
24 years, 215 days	(Netherlands) Richard Krajicek	1996 Wimbledon	6 December 1971	8 July 1996	
20 years, 272 days	(Brazil) Gustavo Kuerten	1997 French Open	10 September 1976	9 June 1997	1st of 3
24 years, 254 days	(Australia) Patrick Rafter	1997 US Open	28 December 1972	8 September 1997	1st of 2
30 years, 9 days	(Czech Republic) Petr Korda	1998 Australian Open	23 January 1968	1 February 1998	
21 years, 285 days	(Spain) Carlos Moyá	1998 French Open	27 August 1976	8 June 1998	
20 years, 228 days	(Russia) Marat Safin	2000 US Open	27 January 1980	11 September 2000	1st of 2
29 years, 299 days	(Croatia) Goran Ivanišević	2001 Wimbledon	13 September 1971	9 July 2001	
20 years, 198 days	(Australia) Lleyton Hewitt	2001 US Open	24 February 1981	10 September 2001	1st of 2
26 years, 310 days	(Sweden) Thomas Johansson	2002 Australian Open	24 March 1975	28 January 2002	
26 years, 350 days	(Spain) Albert Costa	2002 French Open	25 June 1975	10 June 2002	
23 years, 117 days	(Spain) Juan Carlos Ferrero	2003 French Open	12 February 1980	9 June 2003	
21 years, 333 days	(Switzerland) Roger Federer	2003 Wimbledon	8 August 1981	7 July 2003	1st of 20
21 years, 8 days	(United States) Andy Roddick	2003 US Open	30 August 1982	7 September 2003	
25 years, 181 days	(Argentina) Gastón Gaudio	2004 French Open	9 December 1978	7 June 2004	
19 years, 3 days	(Spain) Rafael Nadal	2005 French Open	3 June 1986	6 June 2005	1st of 22
20 years, 251 days	(Serbia) Novak Djokovic	2008 Australian Open	22 May 1987	28 January 2008	1st of 24
20 years, 356 days	(Argentina) Juan Martín del Potro	2009 US Open	23 September 1988	14 September 2009	
25 years, 118 days	(United Kingdom) Andy Murray	2012 US Open	15 May 1987	10 September 2012	1st of 3
28 years, 304 days	(Switzerland) Stan Wawrinka	2014 Australian Open	28 March 1985	26 January 2014	1st of 3
25 years, 345 days	(Croatia) Marin Čilić	2014 US Open	28 September 1988	8 September 2014	
27 years, 10 days	(Austria) Dominic Thiem	2020 US Open	3 September 1993	13 September 2020	
25 years, 213 days	(Russia) Daniil Medvedev	2021 US Open	11 February 1996	12 September 2021	
19 years, 129 days	(Spain) Carlos Alcaraz	2022 US Open	5 May 2003	11 September 2022	1st of 7
22 years, 165 days	(Italy) Jannik Sinner	2024 Australian Open	16 August 2001	28 January 2024	1st of 5
29 years, 48 days	(Germany) Alexander Zverev	2026 French Open	20 April 1997	7 June 2026	1st of 2

== Women ==
Age	Name	Tournament	Date of birth	Date of first title °	Notes
25 years, 290 days	(United States) Nancy Richey *	1968 French Open	23 August 1942	8 June 1968	
23 years, 59 days	(United Kingdom) Virginia Wade	1968 US Open	10 July 1945	7 September 1968	1st of 3
24 years, 226 days	(United States) Billie Jean King *	1968 Wimbledon	22 November 1943	5 July 1968	1st of 8
26 years, 194 days	(Australia) Margaret Court *	1969 Australian Open	16 July 1942	26 January 1969	1st of 11
19 years, 309 days	(Australia) E. Goolagong Cawley	1971 French Open	31 July 1951	5 June 1971	1st of 7
19 years, 176 days	(United States) Chris Evert	1974 French Open	21 December 1954	15 June 1974	1st of 18
20 years, 55 days	(United Kingdom) Sue Barker	1976 French Open	19 April 1956	13 June 1976	
29 years, 154 days	(Australia) Kerry Reid	1977 Australian Open (Jan.)	7 August 1947	8 January 1977	
20 years, 319 days	(Socialist Federal Republic of Yugoslavia) Mima Jaušovec	1977 French Open	20 July 1956	4 June 1977	
23 years, 130 days	(Romania) Virginia Ruzici	1978 French Open	31 January 1955	10 June 1978	
21 years, 262 days	(United States) Martina Navratilova	1978 Wimbledon	18 October 1956	7 July 1978	1st of 18
22 years, 274 days	(United States) Barbara Jordan	1979 Australian Open	2 April 1957	1 January 1980	
16 years, 270 days	(United States) Tracy Austin	1979 US Open	12 December 1962	8 September 1979	1st of 2
18 years, 329 days	(Czechoslovakia) Hana Mandlíková	1980 Australian Open	19 February 1962	3 January 1981	1st of 4
17 years, 357 days	(West Germany) Steffi Graf	1987 French Open	14 June 1969	6 June 1987	1st of 22
17 years, 174 days	(Spain) A. Sánchez Vicario	1989 French Open	18 December 1971	10 June 1989	1st of 4
16 years, 189 days	(Socialist Federal Republic of Yugoslavia) Monica Seles	1990 French Open	2 December 1973	9 June 1990	1st of 9
20 years, 115 days	(Argentina) Gabriela Sabatini	1990 US Open	16 May 1970	8 September 1990	
22 years, 77 days	(Spain) Conchita Martínez	1994 Wimbledon	16 April 1972	2 July 1994	
20 years, 13 days	(France) Mary Pierce	1995 Australian Open	15 January 1975	28 January 1995	1st of 2
16 years, 117 days	(Switzerland) Martina Hingis	1997 Australian Open	30 September 1980	25 January 1997	1st of 5
19 years, 299 days	(Croatia) Iva Majoli	1997 French Open	12 August 1977	7 June 1997	
29 years, 275 days	(Czech Republic) Jana Novotná	1998 Wimbledon	2 October 1968	4 July 1998	
22 years, 96 days	(United States) Lindsay Davenport	1998 US Open	8 June 1976	12 September 1998	1st of 3
17 years, 350 days	(United States) Serena Williams	1999 US Open	26 September 1981	11 September 1999	1st of 23
20 years, 21 days	(United States) Venus Williams	2000 Wimbledon	17 June 1980	8 July 2000	1st of 7
24 years, 304 days	(United States) Jennifer Capriati	2001 Australian Open	29 March 1976	27 January 2001	1st of 3
21 years, 6 days	(Belgium) Justine Henin	2003 French Open	1 June 1982	7 June 2003	1st of 7
22 years, 333 days	(Russia) Anastasia Myskina	2004 French Open	8 July 1981	5 June 2004	
17 years, 75 days	(Russia) Maria Sharapova	2004 Wimbledon	19 April 1987	3 July 2004	1st of 5
19 years, 76 days	(Russia) Svetlana Kuznetsova	2004 US Open	27 June 1985	11 September 2004	1st of 2
22 years, 94 days	(Belgium) Kim Clijsters	2005 US Open	8 June 1983	10 September 2005	1st of 4
26 years, 207 days	(France) Amélie Mauresmo	2006 Australian Open	5 July 1979	28 January 2006	1st of 2
20 years, 214 days	(Serbia) Ana Ivanovic	2008 French Open	6 November 1987	7 June 2008	
29 years, 346 days	(Italy) Francesca Schiavone	2010 French Open	23 June 1980	5 June 2010	
29 years, 98 days	(China) Li Na	2011 French Open	26 February 1982	4 June 2011	1st of 2
21 years, 116 days	(Czech Republic) Petra Kvitová	2011 Wimbledon	8 March 1990	2 July 2011	1st of 2
27 years, 165 days	(Australia) Samantha Stosur	2011 US Open	30 March 1984	11 September 2011	
22 years, 181 days	(Belarus) Victoria Azarenka	2012 Australian Open	31 July 1989	28 January 2012	1st of 2
28 years, 277 days	(France) Marion Bartoli	2013 Wimbledon	2 October 1984	6 July 2013	
33 years, 199 days	(Italy) Flavia Pennetta	2015 US Open	25 February 1982	12 September 2015	
28 years, 12 days	(Germany) Angelique Kerber	2016 Australian Open	18 January 1988	30 January 2016	1st of 3
22 years, 240 days	(Spain) Garbiñe Muguruza	2016 French Open	8 October 1993	4 June 2016	1st of 2
20 years, 2 days	(Latvia) Jeļena Ostapenko	2017 French Open	8 June 1997	10 June 2017	
24 years, 173 days	(United States) Sloane Stephens	2017 US Open	20 March 1993	9 September 2017	
27 years, 200 days	(Denmark) Caroline Wozniacki	2018 Australian Open	11 July 1990	27 January 2018	
26 years, 255 days	(Romania) Simona Halep	2018 French Open	27 September 1991	9 June 2018	1st of 2
20 years, 327 days	(Japan) Naomi Osaka	2018 US Open	16 October 1997	8 September 2018	1st of 4
23 years, 45 days	(Australia) Ashleigh Barty	2019 French Open	24 April 1996	8 June 2019	1st of 3
19 years, 83 days	(Canada) Bianca Andreescu	2019 US Open	16 June 2000	7 September 2019	
21 years, 79 days	(United States) Sofia Kenin	2020 Australian Open	14 November 1998	1 February 2020	
19 years, 132 days	(Poland) Iga Świątek	2020 French Open	31 May 2001	10 October 2020	1st of 6
25 years, 176 days	(Czech Republic) Barbora Krejčíková	2021 French Open	18 December 1995	12 June 2021	1st of 2
18 years, 302 days	(United Kingdom) Emma Raducanu	2021 US Open	13 November 2002	11 September 2021	
23 years, 22 days	(Kazakhstan) Elena Rybakina	2022 Wimbledon	17 June 1999	9 July 2022	1st of 3
24 years, 268 days	Aryna Sabalenka	2023 Australian Open	5 May 1998	28 January 2023	1st of 4
24 years, 17 days	(Czech Republic) Markéta Vondroušová	2023 Wimbledon	28 June 1999	15 July 2023	
19 years, 180 days	(United States) Coco Gauff	2023 US Open	13 March 2004	9 September 2023	1st of 2
29 years, 343 days	(United States) Madison Keys	2025 Australian Open	17 February 1995	25 January 2025	
19 years, 38 days	Mirra Andreeva	2026 French Open	29 April 2007	6 June 2026	
21 years, 236 days	(Czech Republic) Linda Nosková	2026 Wimbledon	17 November 2004	11 July 2026	

° Note that women's finals occur on the penultimate day of each event.

== Career evolution (by age) ==
- Updated after 2026 Australian Open.
- Only players with three or more singles titles (won during the Open Era) are included.

* Active total. ^ Record number of titles for that age. n Age of first title. n Age of last title.

=== Grand Slam titles ===
==== Men ====
#	Age (end of season)	15	16	17	18	19	20	21	22	23	24	25	26	27	28	29	30	31	32	33	34	35	36	37	38	39	40	41	42	43	44	45
1	(Serbia) Novak Djokovic	0	0	0	0	0	1	1	1	1	4	5	6	7	10	12	12	14	16	17	20^	21^	24^	24^*	24^*							
2	(Spain) Rafael Nadal	0	0	0	0	1	2	3	5	6	9	10	11	13^	14	14	14	16	17^	19^	20^	20	22	22	22*							
3	(Switzerland) Roger Federer	0	0	0	0	0	0	0	1	4	6	9	12^	13^	15^	16^	16^	17^	17^	17	17	17	19	20	20	20	20	20				
4	(United States) Pete Sampras	0	0	0	0	1	1	1	3	5	7	8	10	11	12	13	13	14														
5	(Sweden) Björn Borg	0	0	0	1^	2^	3^	4^	6^	8^	10^	11^																				
6	(Australia) Rod Laver	0	0	0	0	0	0	0	1	2	6	Pro					7	11	11	11	11	11	11	11	11	11						
7	(Czechoslovakia) Ivan Lendl	0	0	0	0	0	0	0	0	0	1	2	4	6	6	7	8	8	8	8	8											
8	(United States) Jimmy Connors	0	0	0	0	0	0	0	3	3	4	4	5	5	5	5	7	8	8	8	8	8	8	8	8	8	8					
9	(United States) Andre Agassi	0	0	0	0	0	0	0	1	1	2	3	3	3	3	5	6	7	7	8	8	8	8									
10	(Australia) Ken Rosewall	0	0	0	0	2^	2	3	4	Pro											5	6	7	7	8	8	8	8	8	8	8	
11	(Spain) Carlos Alcaraz	0	0	0	0	1	2	4^	6^	7																						
12	(Sweden) Mats Wilander	0	0	0	1^	2^	3^	4^	4	4	7	7	7	7	7	7	7	7	7													
13	(United States) John McEnroe	0	0	0	0	0	1	2	4	4	5	7	7	7	7	7	7	7	7	7												
14	(Australia) John Newcombe	0	0	0	0	0	0	0	0	2	2	2	3	4	4	6	6	7	7	7	7											
15	(Sweden) Stefan Edberg	0	0	0	0	1	1	2	3	3	4	5	6	6	6	6	6															
16	(West Germany) Boris Becker	0	0	0	1^	2^	2	2	4	4	5	5	5	5	5	6	6	6	6													
19	(Italy) Jannik Sinner	0	0	0	0	0	0	0	0	2	4	5*																				
17	(United States) Jim Courier	0	0	0	0	0	0	1	3	4	4	4	4	4	4	4	4															
18	(Argentina) Guillermo Vilas	0	0	0	0	0	0	0	0	0	0	2	3	4	4	4	4	4	4	4	4	4	4	4								
20	(Brazil) Gustavo Kuerten	0	0	0	0	0	0	1	0	0	2	3	3	3	3	3	3	3	3													
21	(Czechoslovakia) Jan Kodeš	0	0	0	0	0	0	0	0	0	1	2	2	3	3	3	3	3	3													
22	(United Kingdom) Andy Murray	0	0	0	0	0	0	0	0	0	0	1	2	2	2	3	3	3	3	3	3	3	3	3*								
23	(Switzerland) Stan Wawrinka	0	0	0	0	0	0	0	0	0	0	0	0	0	0	1	2	3	3	3	3	3	3	3	3	3*						
24	(United States) Arthur Ashe	0	0	0	0	0	0	0	0	0	0	1	1	2	2	2	2	2	3	3	3	3	3									

#	Title	1	2	3	4	5	6	7	8	9	10	11	12	13	14	15	16	17	18	19	20	21	22	23	24
	(Serbia) Novak Djokovic	20	23	24	24	24	25	27	27	28	28	28	29	31	31	31	32	32	33	34	34	35	35	36	36
	(Spain) Rafael Nadal	19	20	21	22	22	22	24	24	24	25	26	27	27	28	31	31	32	33	33	34	35	36		
	(Switzerland) Roger Federer	21	22	22	23	23	24	24	24	25	25	25	26	27	27	27	28	30	35	35	36				
	(United States) Pete Sampras	19	21	22	22	22	23	24	25	25	25	26	27	28	31										
	(Sweden) Björn Borg	18	19	20	21	22	22	23	23	24	24	25													
	(Australia) Rod Laver	21	22	23	23	23	24	29	30	30	30	31													
	(Czechoslovakia) Ivan Lendl	24	25	26	26	27	27	28	29																
	(United States) Jimmy Connors	21	21	22	24	26	29	30	31																
	(Australia) Ken Rosewall	18	18	20	21	33	35	36	37																
	(Spain) Carlos Alcaraz	19	20	21	21	22	22	22																	
	(Sweden) Mats Wilander	17	19	20	20	23	23	24																	
	(United States) John McEnroe	20	21	22	22	24	25	25																	
	(Australia) John Newcombe	23	23	26	27	28	29	30																	
	(Sweden) Stefan Edberg	19	21	22	24	25	26																		
	(Germany) Boris Becker	17	18	21	21	23	28																		
	(Italy) Jannik Sinner	22	23	23	23	24																			
	(United States) Jim Courier	20	21	21	22																				
	(Argentina) Guillermo Vilas	24	25	26	27																				
	(Brazil) Gustavo Kuerten	20	23	24																					
	(Czechoslovakia) Jan Kodeš	24	25	27																					
	(United Kingdom) Andy Murray	25	26	29																					
	(United States) Arthur Ashe	25	26	31																					
	(Switzerland) Stanislas Wawrinka	28	30	31																					

==== Women ====
#	Age (end of season)	15	16	17	18	19	20	21	22	23	24	25	26	27	28	29	30	31	32	33	34	35	36	37	38	39	40	41	42	43	44	45	46	47	48
1	(Australia) Margaret Court	0	0	0	1	2	5	7	9	12^	13	13	13	16	20	21^	21	24^	24^	24^															
2	(United States) Serena Williams	0	0	0	1	1	1	4	6	6	7	7	8	9	11	13	13	15	17	18	21	22	23	23	23	23	23	23							
3	(West Germany) Steffi Graf	0	0	0	1	5	8^	9^	10^	11	14^	15^	18^	21^	21^	21^	22^																		
4	(United States) Chris Evert	0	0	0	0	0	2	4	6	7	8	9	11	12	14	15	16	17	18	18	18	18													
5	(United States) Martina Navratilova	0	0	0	0	0	0	0	1	2	2	3	5	8	11	13	15	17	17	17	18	18	18	18	18	retired									18
6	(United States) Billie Jean King	0	0	0	0	0	0	0	0	1	3	5	5	5	6	9	10	11	12	12	12	12	12	12	12	12	12								
7	(Socialist Federal Republic of Yugoslavia) Monica Seles	0	0	1	4^	7^	8^	8	8	9	9	9	9	9	9	9	9																		
8	(Belgium) Justine Henin	0	0	0	0	0	0	2	3	4	5	7	7	7	7	7																			
9	(United States) Venus Williams	0	0	0	0	0	2	4	4	4	4	5	5	6	7	7	7	7	7	7	7	7	7	7	7	7	7	7	7	7	7*				
10	(Australia) E. Goolagong Cawley	0	0	0	0	0	2	2	2	3	4	5	6	6	6	7	7	7	7																
11	(Poland) Iga Świątek	0	0	0	0	1	1	3	4	5	6*																								
12	(Switzerland) Martina Hingis	0	0	3^	4^	5	5	5	5	5	5	5	5	5																					
13	(Russia) Maria Sharapova	0	0	1	1	2	2	3	3	3	3	4	4	5	5	5	5	5	5	5															
14	(Japan) Naomi Osaka	0	0	0	0	0	0	1	2	3	4	4	4	4*																					
15	(Czechoslovakia) Hana Mandlíková	0	0	0	1	2	2	2	2	3	3	4	4	4	4																				
16	(Spain) A. Sánchez Vicario	0	0	0	1	1	1	1	1	3	3	3	3	4	4	4	4	4																	
17	Aryna Sabalenka	0	0	0	0	0	0	0	0	0	0	1	3	4*																					
18	(Belgium) Kim Clijsters	0	0	0	0	0	0	0	1	1	1	1	2	3	4	4	retired							4	4	4									
19	(United States) Lindsay Davenport	0	0	0	0	0	0	0	1	2	3	3	3	3	3	3	3	3	3																
20	(Australia) Ashleigh Barty	0	0	0	0	0	0	0	0	1	0	2	3																						
21	(United States) Jennifer Capriati	0	0	0	0	0	0	0	0	0	0	2	3	3	3																				
22	(Germany) Angelique Kerber	0	0	0	0	0	0	0	0	0	0	0	0	0	2	2	3	3	3	3	3	3	3*												
23	(United Kingdom) Virginia Wade	0	0	0	0	0	0	0	0	1	1	1	1	2	2	2	2	2	3	3	3	3	3	3	3	3	3								

#	Title	1	2	3	4	5	6	7	8	9	10	11	12	13	14	15	16	17	18	19	20	21	22	23	24
	(Australia) Margaret Court	17	18	19	19	20	20	20	21	21	22	22	23	23	26	26	27	27	27	27	28	28	30	30	31
	(United States) Serena Williams	17	20	20	20	21	21	23	25	26	27	27	28	28	30	30	31	31	32	33	33	33	34	35	
	(Germany) Steffi Graf	17	18	18	19	19	19	20	20	20	22	23	23	24	24	24	25	26	26	26	27	27	29		
	(United States) Chris Evert	19	19	20	20	21	21	22	23	24	25	25	26	27	27	28	29	30	31						
	(United States) Martina Navratilova	21	22	25	25	25	26	26	27	27	27	27	28	29	29	29	30	30	33						
	(United States) Billie Jean King	22	23	23	24	24	27	28	28	28	29	30	31												
	(Socialist Federal Republic of Yugoslavia) / (United States) Monica Seles	16	17	17	17	18	18	18	19	22															
	(Belgium) Justine Henin	21	21	21	23	24	25	25																	
	(Australia) Evonne Goolagong	19	19	22	23	24	26	28																	
	(United States) Venus Williams	20	20	21	21	25	27	28																	
	(Poland) Iga Świątek	19	21	21	22	23	24																		
	(Switzerland) Martina Hingis	16	16	16	17	18																			
	(Russia) Maria Sharapova	17	19	20	25	27																			
	(Japan) Naomi Osaka	20	21	22	23																				
	(Czechoslovakia) Hana Mandlíková	18	19	23	24																				
	(Spain) Arantxa Sánchez Vicario	17	22	22	26																				
	(Belgium) Kim Clijsters	22	26	27	27																				
	Aryna Sabalenka	24	25	26	27																				
	(United States) Lindsay Davenport	22	23	23																					
	(Australia) Ashleigh Barty	23	25	25																					
	(United States) Jennifer Capriati	24	25	25																					
	(Kazakhstan) Elena Rybakina	23	26	27																					
	(Germany) Angelique Kerber	28	28	30																					
	(United Kingdom) Virginia Wade	23	26	31																					
