= 2007 Zurich Open – Doubles =

Doubles
- 2007 Zurich Open

Final
- Champions: (Czech Republic) Květa Peschke (Australia) Rennae Stubbs
- Runners-up: (United States) Lisa Raymond (Italy) Francesca Schiavone
- Score: 7–5, 7–6^{(7–1)}

Events
Singles	Doubles
← 2006 ·	Zurich Open	· 2008 →

2007 Zurich Open – doubles was the women's doubles tennis competition in the 2007 Zurich Open. Květa Peschke and Rennae Stubbs won in the final 7–5, 7–6^{(7–1)} against Lisa Raymond and Francesca Schiavone.

== Seeds ==
1. (Zimbabwe) Cara Black / (United States) Liezel Huber (semifinals)
2. (Slovenia) Katarina Srebotnik / (Japan) Ai Sugiyama (quarterfinals)
3. (Chinese Taipei) Chan Yung-jan / (Chinese Taipei) Chuang Chia-jung (quarterfinals)
4. (Australia) Alicia Molik / (Italy) Mara Santangelo (quarterfinals)

== Draw ==
- WC - Wildcard
- r - Retired

First round
1	(Zimbabwe) C Black (United States) L Huber	6	6
(Netherlands) M Krajicek (Czech Republic) V Uhlířová	4	3
(Spain) A Medina Garrigues (Italy) F Pennetta	6	6
(Slovakia) D Hantuchová (Israel) S Pe'er	4	2
3	(Chinese Taipei) Chan YJ (Chinese Taipei) Chuang CJ	6	7
(Ukraine) A Bondarenko (Russia) V Dushevina	4	5
(United States) L Raymond (Italy) F Schiavone	7	6
WC	(Switzerland) E Gagliardi (Switzerland) S Vögele	5	4
(China) P Shuai (United States) M Tu	6	6
WC	(India) S Mirza (Switzerland) P Schnyder	3	1
(France) N Dechy (Russia) D Safina	4	6	[8]
4	(Australia) A Molik (Italy) Mara Santangelo	6	4	[10]
(Czech Republic) K Peschke (Australia) R Stubbs	6	6
(Russia) M Kirilenko (Russia) E Vesnina	3	2
(Slovakia) J Husárová (Russia) V Zvonareva	2	3
2	(Slovenia) K Srebotnik (Japan) A Sugiyama	6	6

Quarterfinals
1	(Zimbabwe) C Black (United States) L Huber	6^{10}	6	[10]
(Spain) A Medina Garrigues (Italy) F Pennetta	7^{12}	2	[2]
3	(Chinese Taipei) Chan YJ (Chinese Taipei) Chuang CJ	1	5
(United States) L Raymond (Italy) F Schiavone	6	7
(China) P Shuai (United States) M Tu	6	6
4	(Australia) A Molik (Italy) M Santangelo	4	3
(Czech Republic) K Peschke (Australia) R Stubbs	6	5	[10]
2	(Slovenia) K Srebotnik (Japan) A Sugiyama	4	7	[8]

Semifinals
1	(Zimbabwe) C Black (United States) L Huber	4	7	[6]
(United States) L Raymond (Italy) F Schiavone	6	5	[10]
(China) P Shuai (United States) M Tu	4	3
(Czech Republic) K Peschke (Australia) R Stubbs	6	6

Final
(United States) L Raymond (Italy) F Schiavone	5	6^{1}
(Czech Republic) K Peschke (Australia) R Stubbs	7	7^{7}

== See also ==
- 2007 Zurich Open - Singles
