= 2008 Zurich Open =

- Date: 11–19 October
- Edition: 25th
- Category: Tier II Series
- Draw: 32S / 16D
- Prize money: $600,000
- Surface: Hard / indoor
- Location: Zürich, Switzerland
- Venue: Hallenstadion

Champions

Singles
- (United States) Venus Williams

Doubles
- (Zimbabwe) Cara Black / (United States) Liezel Huber
← 2007 ·	Zurich Open

The 2008 TENNIS.com Zurich Open was a women's tennis tournament played on indoor hard courts. It was the 25th and last edition of the event known that year as the TENNIS.com Zurich Open, and was part of the Tier II Series of the 2008 WTA Tour. It took place at the Hallenstadion in Zürich, Switzerland, from 11 October through 19 October 2008. Third-seeded Venus Williams won the singles title, her second at the event after 1999, while Cara Black and Liezel Huber won the doubles.

== Finals ==
=== Singles ===
(United States) Venus Williams defeated (Italy) Flavia Pennetta, 7–6^{(7–1)}, 6–2

- It was Williams' 2nd singles title of the year, and the 38th of her career.

=== Doubles ===
(Zimbabwe) Cara Black / (United States) Liezel Huber defeated (Germany) Anna-Lena Grönefeld / (Switzerland) Patty Schnyder, 6–1, 7–6^{(7–3)}
