= 2008 JB Group Classic =

- 2008 JB Group Classic

Final
- Champion: (United States) Venus Williams
- Runner-up: (Russia) Maria Sharapova
- Score: 6–4, 6–3

Events
Singles	men	women
Doubles	men	women
← 2007 ·	JB Group Classic	· 2009 →

The 2008 JB Group Classic is a women's exhibition (no points for the world ranking can be earned) tennis tournament organized at the beginning of each season. Venus Williams won the exhibition.

== Seeds ==
1. (Serbia) Ana Ivanovic (quarterfinals)
2. (Russia) Maria Sharapova (final)
3. (Russia) Anna Chakvetadze (semifinals)
4. (United States) Venus Williams (champion)
5. (Russia) Elena Dementieva (semifinals)
6. (Slovakia) Daniela Hantuchová (quarterfinals)
7. (Denmark) Caroline Wozniacki (quarterfinals)
8. (China) Peng Shuai (quarterfinals)

== Golden Group draw ==
Quarterfinals
1	(Serbia) Ana Ivanovic	4	6	3
5	(Russia) Elena Dementieva	6	1	6
8	(China) Peng Shuai	1	2
4	(United States) Venus Williams	6	6
3	(Russia) Anna Chakvetadze	6	6
6	(Slovakia) Daniela Hantuchová	4	3
7	(Denmark) Caroline Wozniacki	2	2
2	(Russia) Maria Sharapova	6	6

Semifinals
5	(Russia) Elena Dementieva	3	3
2	(United States) Venus Williams	6	6
3	(Russia) Anna Chakvetadze	2	4
2	(Russia) Maria Sharapova	6	6

Final
4	(United States) Venus Williams	6	6
2	(Russia) Maria Sharapova	4	3

== Silver Group finals ==
Semifinals
1	(Serbia) Ana Ivanovic	1	3
8	(China) Peng Shuai	6	6
(Portugal) Michelle Larcher de Brito	0^{r}
7	(Denmark) Caroline Wozniacki	0

Final
8	(China) Peng Shuai	6	4	10
7	(Denmark) Caroline Wozniacki	2	6	6
