= 2007 Zurich Open – Singles =

Singles
- 2007 Zurich Open

Final
- Champion: (Belgium) Justine Henin
- Runner-up: (France) Tatiana Golovin
- Score: 6–4, 6–4

Details
- Draw: 28
- Seeds: 8

Events
Singles	Doubles
← 2006 ·	Zurich Open	· 2008 →

Justine Henin defeated Tatiana Golovin in the final, 6–4, 6–4 to win the singles tennis title at the 2007 Zurich Open.

Maria Sharapova was the reigning champion, but withdrew due to a right shoulder injury.

== Singles seeds ==
- Players seeded 1-4 received byes in the first round. Maria Sharapova, the fourth seed, dropped out of the tournament. Her bye was given to number five seed Ana Ivanovic
1. (Belgium) Justine Henin (champion)
2. (Russia) Svetlana Kuznetsova (quarterfinals)
3. (Serbia) Jelena Janković (second round)
4. (Russia) Maria Sharapova (withdrew; injured right shoulder; replaced by Agnieszka Radwańska)
5. (Serbia) Ana Ivanovic (second round)
6. (United States) Serena Williams (first round)
7. (Slovakia) Daniela Hantuchová (second round)
8. (France) Amélie Mauresmo (second round)
9. (France) Marion Bartoli (quarterfinals)

== Singles draw ==
=== Key ===
- Q = Qualifier
- WC = Wild card
- LL = Lucky loser
- Alt = Alternate
- SE = Special exempt
- PR = Protected ranking
- ITF = ITF entry
- JE = Junior exempt
- w/o = Walkover
- r = Retired
- d = Defaulted
- SR = Special ranking

=== Finals ===
Semifinals
1	(Belgium) Justine Henin	3	6	7
(Czech Republic) Nicole Vaidišová	6	3	5
(France) Tatiana Golovin	6	6
(Italy) Francesca Schiavone	0	4

Finals
1	(Belgium) Justine Henin	6	6
(France) Tatiana Golovin	4	4

=== Section 1 ===
First round
Q	(Italy) K Knapp	7	2	2
(Russia) V Zvonareva	5	6	6
LL	(Poland) A Radwańska	6	6
(Israel) S Pe'er	4	3
(Russia) D Safina	6^{2}	6^{4}
7	(Slovakia) D Hantuchová	7^{7}	7^{7}
(Czech Republic) N Vaidišová	6	6
(Slovenia) K Srebotnik	4	2
(Ukraine) A Bondarenko	1	6	6
WC	(Switzerland) T Bacsinszky	6	3	3
Q	(Greece) E Daniilidou	4	6	3
8	(France) A Mauresmo	6	4	6

Second round
1	(Belgium) J Henin	6	6
(Russia) V Zvonareva	3	1
LL	(Poland) A Radwańska	6	6
7	(Slovakia) D Hantuchová	3	3
3	(Serbia) J Janković	4	4
(Czech Republic) N Vaidišová	6	6
(Ukraine) A Bondarenko	2	6	6
8	(France) A Mauresmo	6	4	1

Quarterfinals
1	(Belgium) J Henin	6	6
LL	(Poland) A Radwańska	4	2
(Czech Republic) N Vaidišová	6	6
(Ukraine) A Bondarenko	1	4

Semifinals
1	(Belgium) J Henin	3	6	7
(Czech Republic) N Vaidišová	6	3	5

=== Section 2 ===
First round
9	(France) M Bartoli	6^{4}	6	6
Q	(China) Peng S	7^{7}	0	1
(India) S Mirza	1	4
WC	(Netherlands) M Krajicek	6	6
WC	(Russia) M Kirilenko	3	4
(France) T Golovin	6	6
6	(United States) S Williams	0	0^{r}
(Switzerland) P Schnyder	6	3
(Russia) E Dementieva	6	1	2^{r}
(Italy) F Schiavone	4	6	4
(Austria) S Bammer	6	6
Q	(Ukraine) K Bondarenko	2	2

Second round
9	(France) M Bartoli	6	6
WC	(Netherlands) M Krajicek	4	1
(France) T Golovin	6	6
5	(Serbia) A Ivanovic	3	1
(Switzerland) P Schnyder	6	3	4
(Italy) F Schiavone	2	6	6
(Austria) S Bammer	6	4	5
2	(Russia) S Kuznetsova	2	6	7

Quarterfinals
9	(France) M Bartoli	5	r
(France) T Golovin	4
(Italy) F Schiavone	6	3
2	(Russia) S Kuznetsova	3	3	r

Semifinals
(France) T Golovin	6	6
(Italy) F Schiavone	0	4

== Qualifying seeds ==
1. (Poland) Agnieszka Radwańska (qualifying competition, lucky loser)
2. (Spain) Anabel Medina Garrigues (qualifying competition)
3. (Ukraine) Julia Vakulenko (second round)
4. (Japan) Ai Sugiyama (qualifying competition)
5. (Greece) Eleni Daniilidou (qualified)
6. (Ukraine) Kateryna Bondarenko (qualified)
7. (Austria) Tamira Paszek (second round)
8. (United States) Meilen Tu (second round)

== Qualifying draw ==
=== First qualifier ===
First round
1	(Poland) Agnieszka Radwańska	6	4	6
(Argentina) María Emilia Salerni	1	6	2
(Italy) Maria Elena Camerin	4	6^{3}
(Germany) Gréta Arn	6	7^{7}
(Estonia) Kaia Kanepi	3	5
(Italy) Karin Knapp	6	7
(Russia) Elena Vesnina	5	3
8	(United States) Meilen Tu	7	6

Second round
1	(Poland) Agnieszka Radwańska	6	7
(Germany) Gréta Arn	3	5
(Italy) Karin Knapp	6	7
8	(United States) Meilen Tu	2	5

Qualifying competition
1	(Poland) Agnieszka Radwańska	4	3
(Italy) Karin Knapp	6	6

=== Second qualifier ===
First round
2	(Spain) Anabel Medina Garrigues	6	6
(Switzerland) Emmanuelle Gagliardi	2	3
WC	(Switzerland) Amra Sadiković	7^{7}	6
(Russia) Yaroslava Shvedova	6^{5}	4
(France) Séverine Brémond	1	7^{7}	6
(Colombia) Catalina Castaño	6	6^{2}	4
(Germany) Tatjana Malek	3	5
5	(Greece) Eleni Daniilidou	6	7

Second round
2	(Spain) Anabel Medina Garrigues	6	6
WC	(Switzerland) Amra Sadiković	1	3
(France) Séverine Brémond	3	0
5	(Greece) Eleni Daniilidou	6	6

Qualifying competition
2	(Spain) Anabel Medina Garrigues	3	2
5	(Greece) Eleni Daniilidou	6	6

=== Third qualifier ===
First round
3	(Ukraine) Julia Vakulenko	6	6
(Russia) Vera Dushevina	3	1
(Russia) Olga Puchkova	6	6
(Austria) Yvonne Meusburger	2	4
(Germany) Angelique Kerber	2	0
(China) Peng Shuai	6	6
(Ukraine) Olga Savchuk	0	6^{6}
7	(Austria) Tamira Paszek	6	7^{8}

Second round
3	(Ukraine) Julia Vakulenko	6	3	4
(Russia) Olga Puchkova	1	6	6
(China) Peng Shuai	6	4	6
7	(Austria) Tamira Paszek	1	6	3

Qualifying competition
(Russia) Olga Puchkova	3	3
(China) Peng Shuai	6	6

=== Fourth qualifier ===
First round
4	(Japan) Ai Sugiyama	6	6
WC	(Czech Republic) Zuzana Ondrášková	3	0
WC	(Switzerland) Stefanie Vögele	2	1
(Australia) Alicia Molik	6	6
Alt	(Hungary) Kira Nagy	6	3	6
WC	(Slovenia) Andreja Klepač	4	6	1
(France) Nathalie Dechy	4	2
6	(Ukraine) Kateryna Bondarenko	6	6

Second round
4	(Japan) Ai Sugiyama	7	6
(Australia) Alicia Molik	5	4
Alt	(Hungary) Kira Nagy	1	5
6	(Ukraine) Kateryna Bondarenko	6	7

Qualifying competition
4	(Japan) Ai Sugiyama	2	1
6	(Ukraine) Kateryna Bondarenko	6	6
