= 2008 WTA Tour Championships =

- Date: 4–9 November
- Edition: 38th (singles) / 33rd (doubles)
- Draw: 8S / 4D
- Location: Doha, Qatar
- Venue: Khalifa International Tennis Complex

Champions

Singles
- (United States) Venus Williams

Doubles
- (Zimbabwe) Cara Black / (United States) Liezel Huber
- WTA Finals

The 2008 WTA Tour Championships (also known as the Sony Ericsson WTA Tour Championships for sponsorship reasons) was a tennis tournament played on outdoor hard courts. It was the 38th edition of the year-end singles championships, the 33rd edition of the year-end doubles championships, and is part of the 2008 WTA Tour. It took place at the Khalifa International Tennis Complex in Doha, Qatar, from 4 November through 9 November 2008.

== Finals ==
=== Singles ===
(United States) Venus Williams defeated (Russia) Vera Zvonareva, 6–7^{(5–7)}, 6–0, 6–2.

- It was Venus Williams' 3rd title of the year, and her 39th overall. It was her 1st career year-end championships title.

=== Doubles ===
(Zimbabwe) Cara Black / (United States) Liezel Huber defeated (Czech Republic) Květa Peschke / (Australia) Rennae Stubbs, 6–1, 7–5.

== Players ==
The top eight players and the top four doubles teams in the 2008 WTA Tour will qualify for the Championships. Two more players will also come to Doha as reserves. Should any player withdraw, they will enter the tournament.

#	Players	Points	Tournaments	Date qualified
1	Jelena Janković (SRB)	4,786		30 July
2	Dinara Safina (RUS)	3,823		4 September
3	Serena Williams (USA)	3,681	13	4 September
4	Elena Dementieva (RUS)	3,400		18 September
5	Ana Ivanovic (SRB)	3,353	18	30 July
6	Svetlana Kuznetsova (RUS)	2,627		17 October
7	Vera Zvonareva (RUS)	2,626		25 October
8	Venus Williams (USA)	2,524		25 October

=== Qualified singles players ===
On 30 July, Jelena Janković and Ana Ivanovic became the first two players to qualify for the year-end championships.

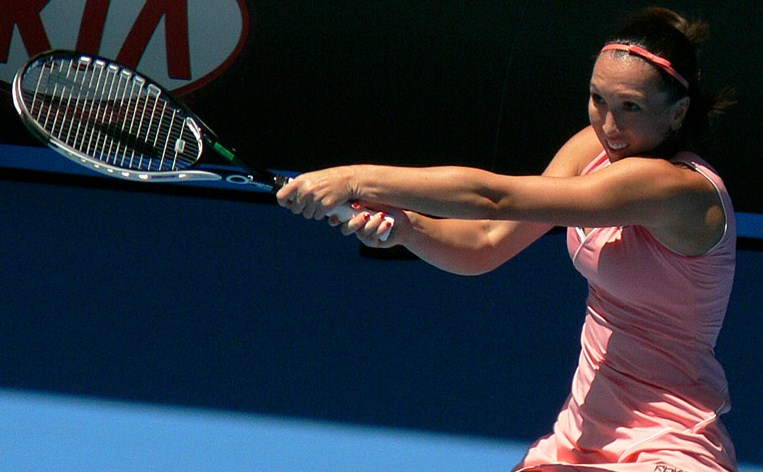
Jelena Janković reached her first Grand Slam final at the US Open.

Following a surging 2007, Janković started the year at the Hopman Cup where she partnered with Novak Djokovic to reach the final, losing out to United States' Serena Williams and Mardy Fish. She reached the semifinals of the Australian Open a few weeks after falling to Maria Sharapova, the eventual champion where she beat Serena Williams en route in the quarterfinals. In February and March, she reached a lone final at the Sony Ericsson Open losing to Serena Williams 1–6, 7–5, 3–6. She further reached two semifinals and two quarterfinals. In the clay season, Janković won the Italian Open for the second straight year against surprise finalist Alizé Cornet who was an 18-year-old qualifier. At the French Open, she reached her third straight major semifinal but fell in three grueling sets to once again the eventual champion in Ana Ivanovic, a match that decided the new World No. 1.

Janković then headed straight to Wimbledon where she lost to Tamarine Tanasugarn in the fourth round. Janković eventually became the 18th female No. 1, replacing compatriot Ivanovic on August 11. At the Beijing Olympics, she lost to eventual silver medalist Dinara Safina in the quarterfinals. At the US Open, Janković beat Elena Dementieva in the final four to reach her first Grand Slam final but lost to Serena Williams. In the fall season, she won three consecutive tournaments at the China Open, the Porsche Tennis Grand Prix and the Kremlin Cup justifying her return to the top spot.

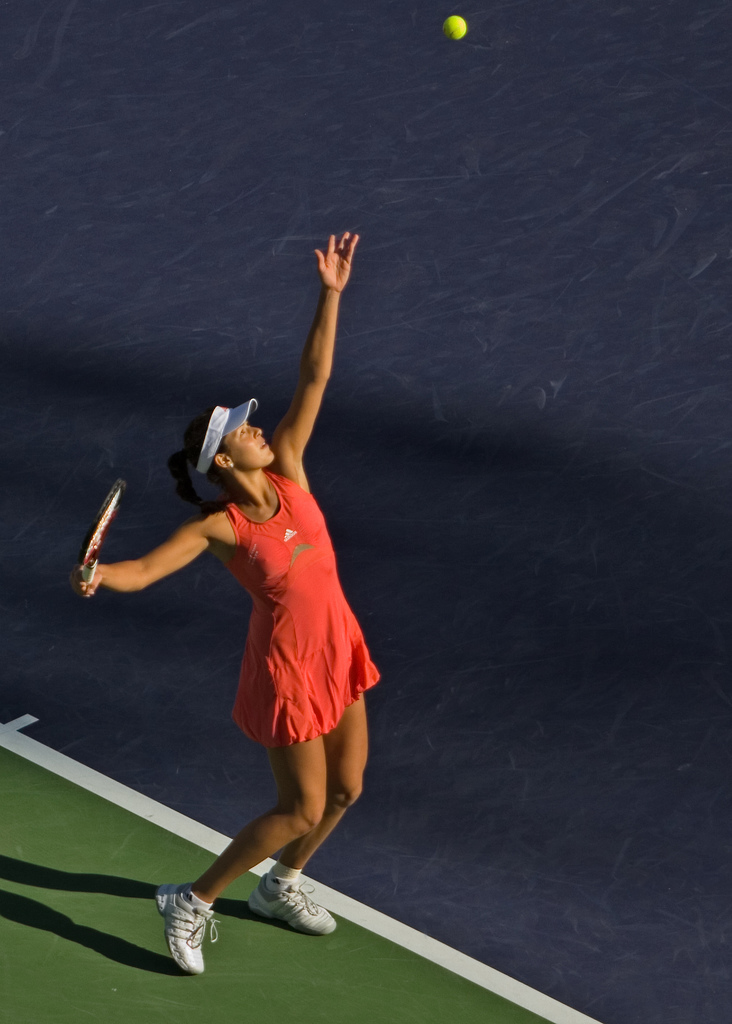
Ana Ivanovic won the French Open.

Ana Ivanovic began the 2008 season by reaching the finals of the Australian Open where she lost to Maria Sharapova in straight sets. She then managed to win her sixth title and third Tier I title in Indian Wells, beating Jelena Janković and Svetlana Kuznetsova in the semifinals and finals respectively. Following a mediocre pre-French Open season where she failed to defend her title in Berlin, she entered Roland Garros as the second seed and favourite. She lived up to that expectation by winning her first Grand Slam (and her only to date) and becoming the first Serbian to reach the No. 1 spot, virtue of beating compatriot Janković in the semifinals. She defeated first-time Grand Slam finalist Dinara Safina 6–4, 6–3. In her first tournament as the new world No. 1 at Wimbledon, she was upset in the third round by Chinese wildcard Zheng Jie. Following a disappointing Wimbledon campaign, she suffered an injury-marred US Open Series as she withdrew from Los Angeles and the Olympics, which Ivanovic described as "one of the worst moments in my career". She played only one tournament which was at the Rogers Cup and was eliminated in the third round. As the top seed for the US Open, she suffered for the second straight major a loss to a player ranked outside the top 100 in French qualifier Julie Coin. She returned to form in October by winning the indoor tournament in Linz as well as reach the semifinals at the Kremlin Cup.

On 4 September, Serena Williams and Dinara Safina were announced as the third and fourth qualifiers for the Championships.

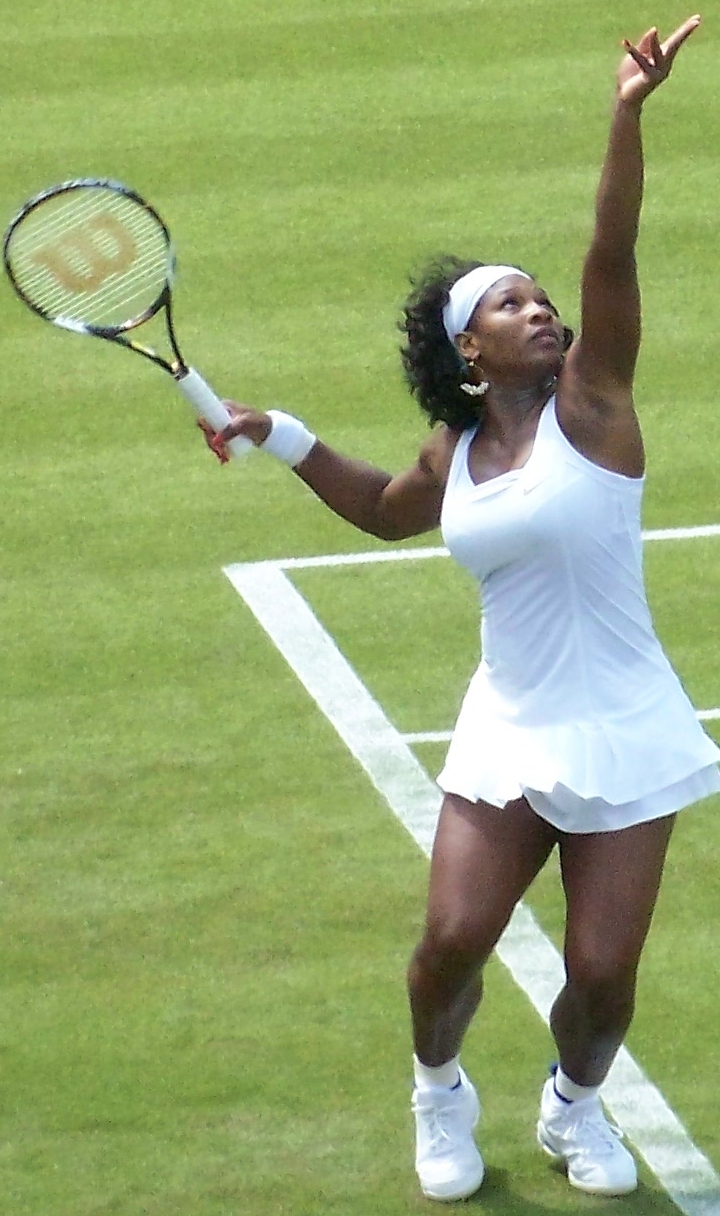
Serena Williams won her third US Open title.

Serena Williams started the year at the Hopman Cup where she teamed up with Mardy Fish to win it for the US. At the Australian Open, she made the quarterfinals losing to Jelena Janković.

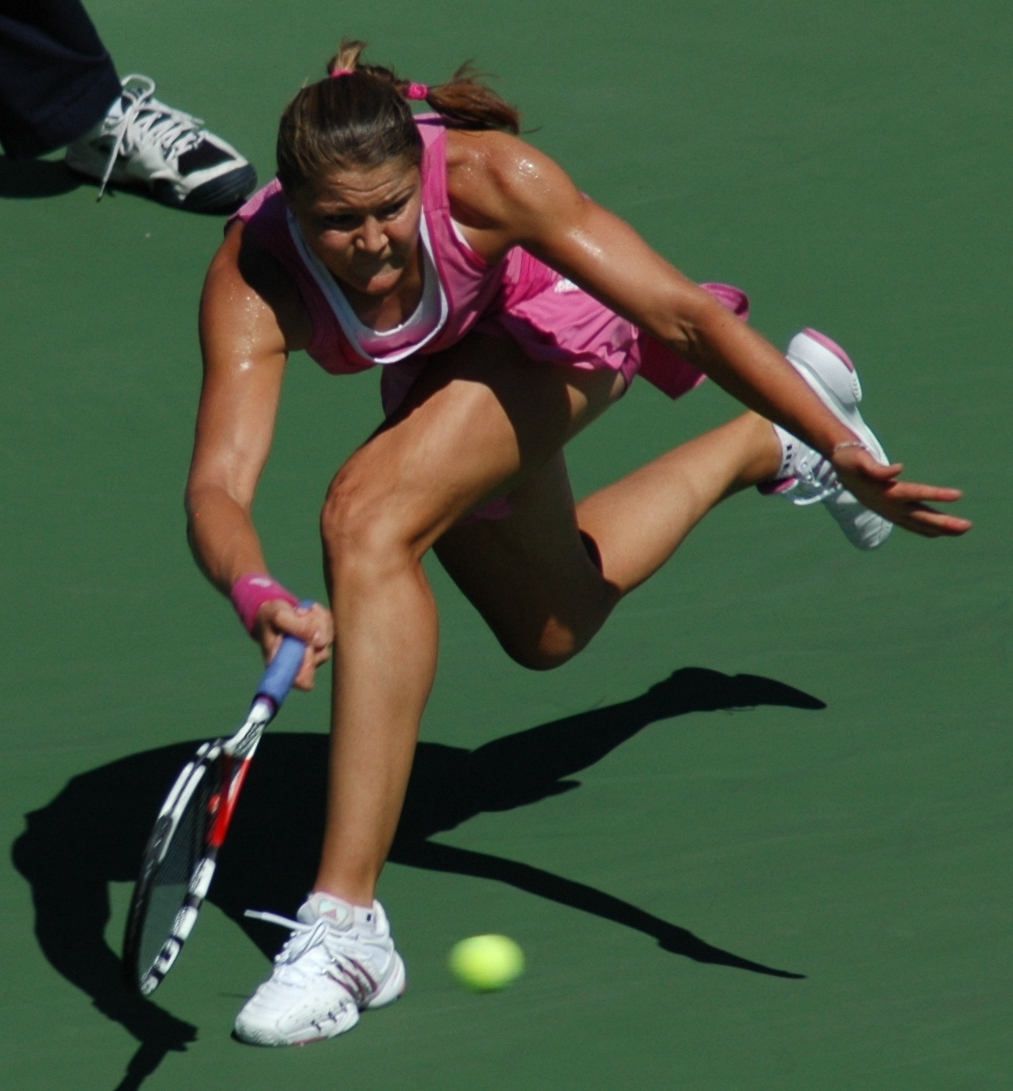
Dinara Safina won four titles during the year.

On 18 September, Elena Dementieva became the fifth qualifier for the Championships.

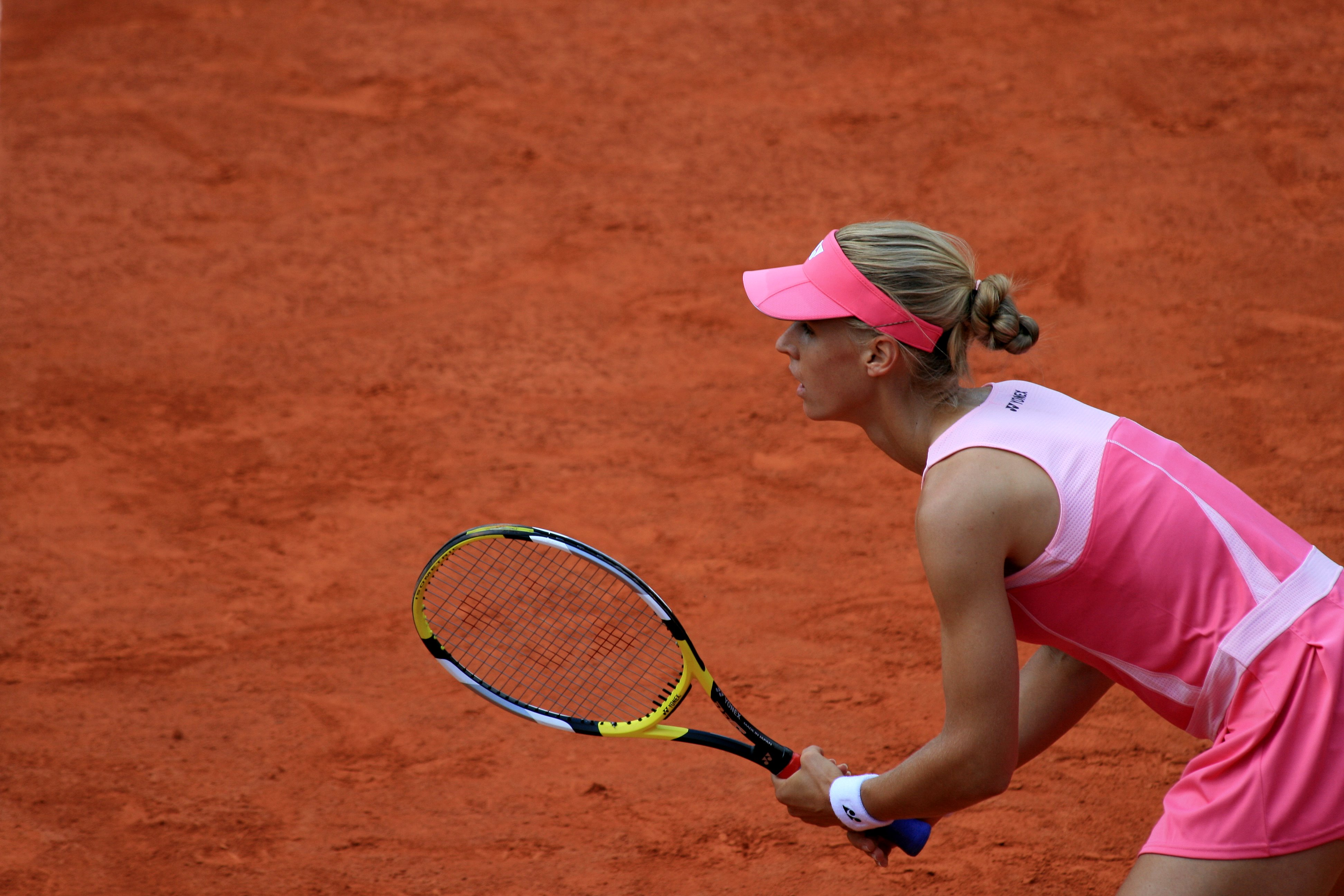
Elena Dementieva won Olympic Gold.

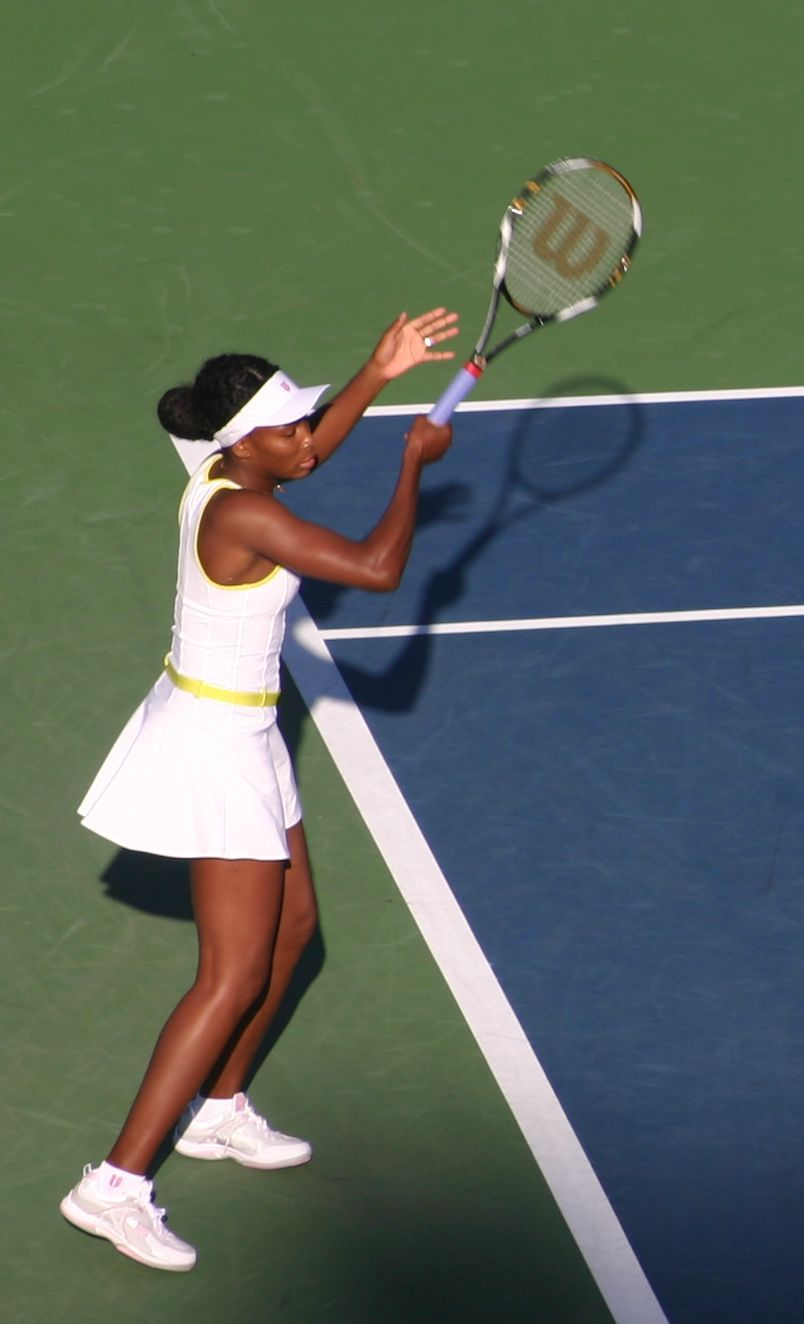
Venus Williams won her fifth Wimbledon title.

On 17 October, by reaching the quarterfinals at the Kremlin Cup, Svetlana Kuznetsova was confirmed as the sixth qualifier.

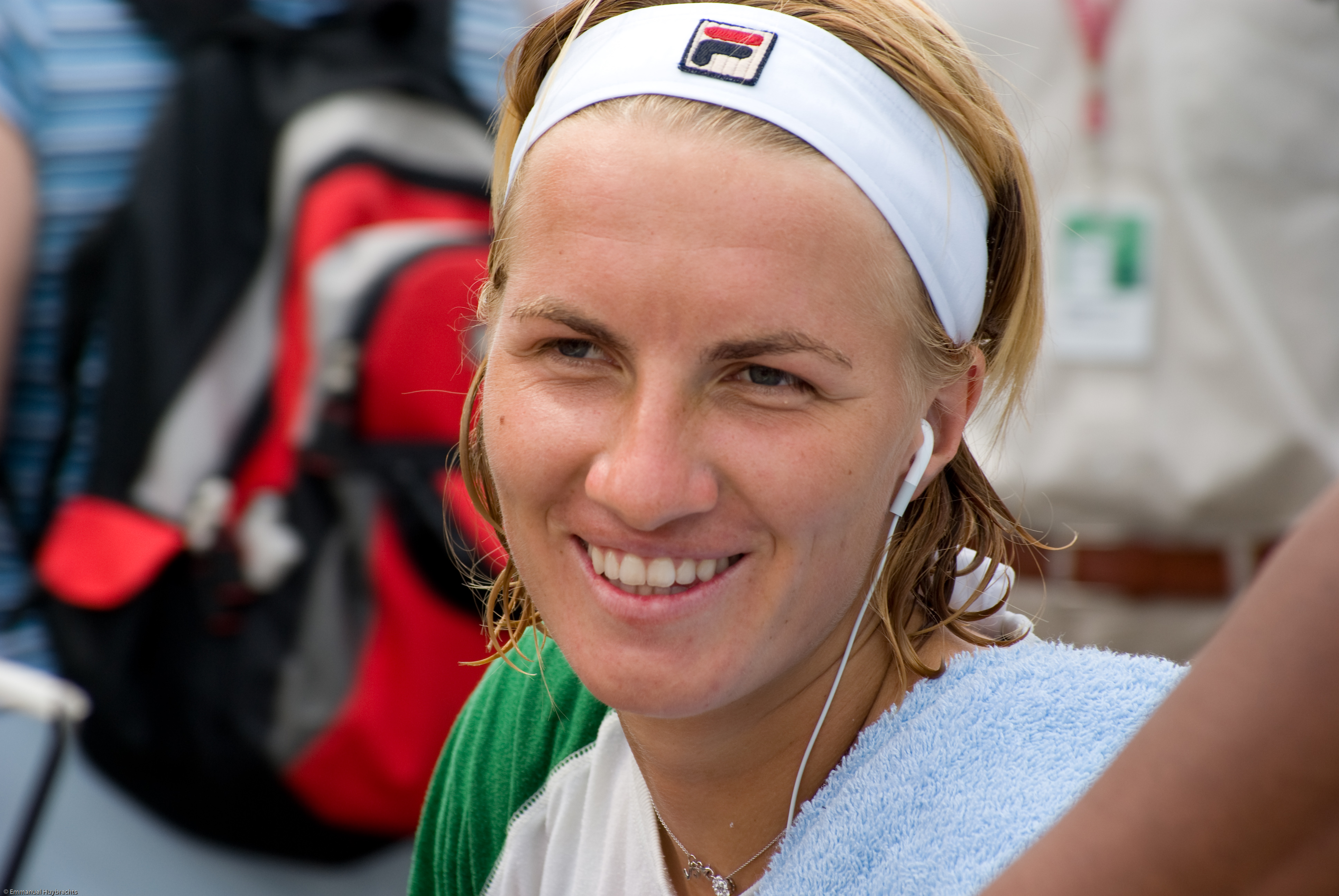
Svetlana Kuznetsova qualifies for the third straight year.

On 25 October, the final two spots were taken by Vera Zvonareva and Venus Williams.

- (Serbia) Jelena Janković (4786)
- (Russia) Dinara Safina (3823)
- (United States) Serena Williams (3681)
- (Russia) Elena Dementieva (3400)
- (Serbia) Ana Ivanovic (3353)
- (Russia) Vera Zvonareva (2626)
- (Russia) Svetlana Kuznetsova (2627)
- (United States) Venus Williams (2524)

=== Singles alternates ===
- (Poland) Agnieszka Radwańska (2256)
- (Russia) Nadia Petrova (1914)

=== Withdrawn players ===
- (Russia) Maria Sharapova (2515) (Sharapova announced a hiatus from tennis from the Rogers Cup until 2009, which prevented her from continuing to collect points and qualify)

=== Qualified doubles teams ===
In doubles, team Cara Black and Liezel Huber qualified with convincing lead with more than 6,000 points, while other three teams all failed to collect even a half of that number of points, with all of them being around 2,000.

- (Zimbabwe) Cara Black / (United States) Liezel Huber (6158)
- (Spain) Anabel Medina Garrigues / (Spain) Virginia Ruano Pascual (2809)
- (Czech Republic) Květa Peschke / (Australia) Rennae Stubbs (2614)
- (Japan) Ai Sugiyama / (Slovenia) Katarina Srebotnik (2542)

== Singles Championship Race ==
=== Singles ===
Players in gold qualified for Doha. Players in brown withdrawn. The low-ranked players in blue after them would be played as alternates in Doha.

Rank	Player	Mandatory Events					Best Other Tournaments												Total points	Tourn
Rank	Player	AUS	FRA	WIM	USO	MIA	1	2	3	4	5	6	7	8	9	10	11	12	Total points	Tourn
1	(Serbia) Jelena Janković	SF; 450	SF; 450	R16; 140	F 700	F 350	W 430	W 430	W 300	W 275	SF; 210	SF; 140	SF; 125	QF; 115	QF; 110	QF; 110	QF; 110	QF; 110	4,786	21
1	(Serbia) Jelena Janković						QF; 90	QF; 70	QF; 70	R16; 1									4,786	21
2	(Russia) Dinara Safina	R128; 2	F 700	R32; 90	SF; 450	QF; 125	W 430	W 430	W 430	W 275	S 245	SF; 195	F 100	QF; 75	R16; 65	R16; 60	R32; 40	R16; 40	3,823	20
2	(Russia) Dinara Safina						QF; 35	R16; 35	R32; 1										3,823	20
3	(United States) Serena Williams	QF; 250	R32; 90	F 700	W 1000	W 500	W 430	W 275	SF; 125	QF; 110	QF; 110	QF; 90	R16; 1						3,681	12
4	(Russia) Elena Dementieva	R16; 140	QF; 250	SF; 450	SF; 450	QF; 125	G 353	W 300	F 300	SF; 195	SF; 195	W 165	SF; 125	QF; 110	F 100	QF; 75	SF; 65	R32; 1	3,400	18
4	(Russia) Elena Dementieva						R32; 1												3,400	18
5	(Serbia) Ana Ivanovic	F 700	W 1000	R32; 90	R64; 60	R32; 45	W 465	W 275	SF; 195	SF; 125	SF; 125	QF; 75	QF; 70	R16; 65	R16; 60	R32; 1	R16; 1	R16; 1	3,353	17
6	(Russia) Vera Zvonareva	R128; 2	R16; 140	R64; 60	R64; 60	SF; 225	F 325	F 300	F 300	F 190	B 175	W 140	SF; 125	W 115	QF; 115	F 80	QF; 75	QF; 70	2,626	24
6	(Russia) Vera Zvonareva						R16; 60	R16; 35	QF; 30	R16; 1	R16; 1	R32; 1	R16; 1						2,626	24
7	(Russia) Svetlana Kuznetsova	R32; 90	SF; 450	R16; 140	R32; 90	SF; 225	F 325	F 300	F 215	F 190	F 190	QF; 110	QF; 110	R16; 65	R16; 60	R16; 60	R16; 1	R64; 1	2,623	18
7	(Russia) Svetlana Kuznetsova						R32; 1												2,623	18
8	(United States) Venus Williams	QF; 250	R32; 90	W 1000	QF; 250	QF; 125	W 275	SF; 140	SF; 125	QF; 110	QF; 90	R16; 65	R32; 1	R32; 1					2,522	13
9	(Russia) Maria Sharapova	W 1000	R16; 140	R64; 60	A 0	A 0	W 465	W 275	SF; 210	SF; 195	QF; 110	R16; 60							2,515	9
10	(Poland) Agnieszka Radwańska	QF; 250	R16; 140	QF; 250	R16; 140	R64; 1	W 275	SF; 210	W 140	SF; 125	W 115	QF; 115	QF; 110	R16; 60	R16; 60	R16; 60	SF; 50	R16; 40	2,256	23
10	(Poland) Agnieszka Radwańska						R16; 35	R16; 35	R32; 28	R32; 15	R32; 1	R32; 1							2,256	23
11	(Russia) Nadia Petrova	R16; 140	R32; 90	QF; 250	R32; 90	R64; 1	F 215	SF; 195	F 190	W 140	W 140	QF; 110	SF; 75	QF; 70	QF; 70	R16; 60	R32; 35	QF; 35	1,914	25
11	(Russia) Nadia Petrova						R32; 1	R32; 1	R32; 1	R64; 1	R32; 1	R64; 1	R32; 1	R32; 1					1,914	25
