= Dinara Safina career statistics =

Career finals
Discipline	Type	Won	Lost	Total	WR (Note: Winning rate)
Singles	Grand Slam	0	3	3	0.00
Singles	Summer Olympics	0	1	1	0.00
Singles	WTA Finals (Note: Formerly known as: Virginia Slims Championships (until 1995); WTA Tour Championships (until 2014))	–	–	–	–
Singles	WTA Elite (Note: Elite tier: WTA Tournament of Champions (2009–14); WTA Elite Trophy (2015–present))	–	–	–	–
Singles	WTA 1000 (Note: Formerly known as: Category 4 & 5 & 6 (until 1990); Tier I (until 2009); WTA Premier Mandatory and 5 (until 2021))	5	3	8	0.63
Singles	WTA 500 (Note: Formerly known as: Category 3 (until 1990); Tier II (until 2009); WTA Premier (until 2021))	2	2	4	0.50
Singles	WTA 250 (Note: Formerly known as: Category 1 & 2 (until 1990); Tier III & IV & V (until 2009); WTA International (until 2021))	5	3	8	0.63
Singles	Total	12	12	24	0.50
Doubles	Grand Slam	1	1	2	0.50
Doubles	Summer Olympics	–	–	–	–
Doubles	WTA Finals	–	–	–	–
Doubles	WTA Elite	–	–	–	–
Doubles	WTA 1000	1	0	1	1.00
Doubles	WTA 500	2	4	6	0.33
Doubles	WTA 250	5	2	7	0.71
Doubles	Total	9	7	16	0.56
Total		21	19	40	0.53

This is a list of the main career statistics of retired Russian professional tennis player Dinara Safina. Throughout her career, Safina won twelve WTA Tour singles titles including three Tier I singles titles at the 2008 German Open, Rogers Cup and Pan Pacific Open, respectively; one Premier Mandatory singles title at the 2009 Madrid Open and one Premier 5 singles title at the 2009 Italian Open. She was also the runner-up at the 2008 French Open and the 2009 Australian Open and French Open as well as a silver medalist in singles at the 2008 Beijing Olympics.

Safina was also an accomplished doubles player, winning nine WTA doubles titles including one Grand Slam doubles title with Nathalie Dechy at the 2007 US Open, one Tier I-doubles title with Elena Vesnina at the 2008 Indian Wells Masters and three consecutive doubles titles at the Brisbane International from 2006 to 2008. Safina achieved her career-high doubles ranking of world No. 8 on May 12, 2008, and subsequently attained the No. 1 ranking in singles on April 20, 2009.

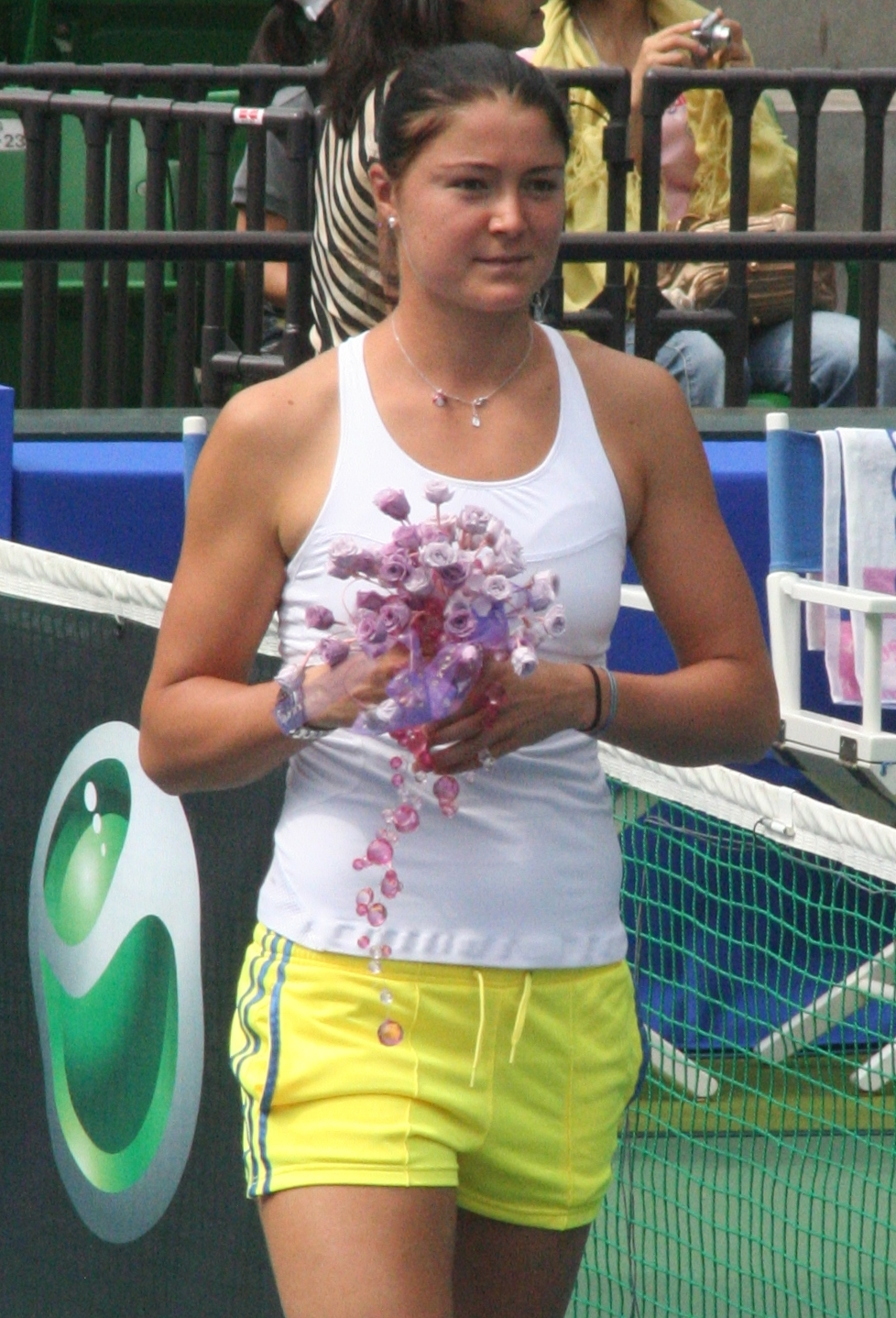
Safina at the 2009 Toray Pan Pacific Open.

== Performance timelines ==
Key
W	F	SF	QF	#R	RR	Q#	P#	DNQ	A	Z#	PO	G	S	B	NMS	NTI	P	NH

(W) winner; (F) finalist; (SF) semifinalist; (QF) quarterfinalist; (#R) rounds 4, 3, 2, 1; (RR) round-robin stage; (Q#) qualification round; (DNQ) did not qualify; (A) absent; (NH) not held; (SR) strike rate (events won / competed); (W–L) win–loss record.

Only main-draw results in WTA Tour, Grand Slam tournaments, Billie Jean King Cup (Fed Cup), Hopman Cup and Olympic Games are included in win–loss records.

=== Singles ===
Tournament	2001	2002	2003	2004	2005	2006	2007	2008	2009	2010	2011	SR	W–L	Win%
Grand Slam tournaments
Australian Open	A	A	1R	3R	2R	2R	3R	1R	F	4R	1R	0 / 9	15–9	63%
French Open	A	A	1R	2R	1R	QF	4R	F	F	1R	A	0 / 8	20–8	71%
Wimbledon	A	Q3	1R	1R	3R	3R	2R	3R	SF	A	A	0 / 7	12–7	63%
US Open	A	2R	4R	1R	1R	QF	4R	SF	3R	1R	A	0 / 9	18–9	67%
Win–loss	0–0	1–1	3–4	3–4	3–4	11–4	9–4	13–4	19–4	3–3	0–1	0 / 33	65–33	66%
National representation
Summer Olympics	not held			A	not held			S	not held			0 / 1	5–1	83%
Year-end championship
WTA Finals	did not qualify							RR	RR	DNQ		0 / 2	0–4	0%
WTA 1000 + former^{†} tournaments
Dubai / Qatar Open (Note: The first Premier 5 event of the year has switched back and forth between the Dubai Tennis Championships and the Qatar Total Open since 2009. Dubai was classified as a Premier 5 event from 2009 to 2011 before being succeeded by Doha for the 2012–2014 period. In 2015, Dubai regained its Premier 5 status while Doha was demoted to Premier status. The Premier 5 tournaments were reclassified as WTA 1000 tournaments in 2021.)	NMS							3R	2R	A	A	0 / 2	2–2	50%
Indian Wells Open	absent		1R	A	3R	QF	3R	3R	QF	A	4R	0 / 7	12–7	63%
Miami Open	absent		2R	2R	2R	2R	4R	QF	3R	A	2R	0 / 8	8–8	50%
Berlin / Madrid Open (Note: In 2009, the Berlin Open was replaced by the Madrid Open. The Premier Mandatory tournaments were reclassified as WTA 1000 tournaments in 2021.)	A	A	2R	1R	2R	QF	QF	W	W	1R	2R	2 / 9	19–7	75%
Italian Open	absent		2R	2R	A	F	QF	A	W	2R	A	1 / 6	14–5	74%
Canadian Open	absent				2R	SF	3R	W	2R	3R	A	1 / 6	13–5	72%
Cincinnati Open	not held			Tier III					F	2R	A	0 / 2	5–2	71%
Pan Pacific Open	absent							W	2R	1R	A	1 / 3	4–2	67%
China Open	Tier IV		Tier II						2R	1R	A	0 / 2	1–2	33%
Charleston Open^{†}	absent					QF	F	3R	Premier			0 / 3	7–3	70%
Southern California Open^{†}	Tier II			A	3R	1R	3R	not held		Premier		0 / 3	3–3	50%
Kremlin Cup^{†}	Q1	2R	2R	2R	SF	1R	SF	SF	Premier			0 / 7	11–7	61%
Zurich Open^{†}	absent						1R	T II	not held			0 / 1	0–1	0%
Win–loss							17–9							
Career statistics
	2001	2002	2003	2004	2005	2006	2007	2008	2009	2010	2011	No.		
Tournaments	0	6	16	19	21	21	23	21	19	16	9	171		
Titles	0	1	1	0	2	0	1	4	3	0	0	12		
Finals	0	1	1	1	2	2	2	7	8	0	0	24		
Hard win–loss	—N/a	2–2	8–9	11–8	16–12	19–11	19–11	36–14	27–12	12–11	5–6	5 / 99	155–96	62%
Clay win–loss	—N/a	9–2	9–4	4–6	9–3	16–5	13–5	14–3	20–2	1–4	6–2	6 / 43	101–36	74%
Grass win–loss	—N/a	—N/a	0–1	0–2	4–2	5–2	4–2	5–2	8–2	0–1	0–0	0 / 14	26–14	65%
Carpet win–loss	—N/a	1–1	1–1	5–3	7–2	4–3	7–4	0–0	0–0	0–0	0–0	1 / 15	25–14	64%
Overall win–loss	0–0	12–5	18–15	20–19	36–19	44–21	43–22	55–19	55–16	13–16	11–8	12 / 171	307–160	66%
Win %	0%	71%	55%	!51%	65%	68%	66%	74%	77%	45%	58%	66%		
Year-end ranking	394	68	54	44	20	11	15	3	2	62	129	No. 1 (April 20, 2009)		

=== Doubles ===
Tournament	2003	2004	2005	2006	2007	2008	2009	2010	2011	W–L
Australian Open	A	A	QF	2R	3R	1R	A	A	1R	6–5
French Open	A	2R	2R	3R	3R	3R	A	2R	A	9–6
Wimbledon	A	A	3R	A	1R	3R	A	A	A	4–3
US Open	A	1R	1R	F	W	A	A	A	A	11–3
Win–loss	0–0	1–2	6–4	8–3	10–3	4–3	0–0	1–1	0–1	30–17

== Grand Slam tournament finals ==
=== Singles: 3 (3 runner-ups) ===
Result	Year	Championship	Surface	Opponent	Score
Loss	2008	French Open	Clay	(Serbia) Ana Ivanovic	4–6, 3–6
Loss	2009	Australian Open	Hard	(United States) Serena Williams	0–6, 3–6
Loss	2009	French Open	Clay	(Russia) Svetlana Kuznetsova	4–6, 2–6

=== Doubles: 2 (1 title, 1 runner-up) ===
Result	Year	Championship	Surface	Partner	Opponents	Score
Loss	2006	US Open	Hard	(Slovenia) Katarina Srebotnik	(France) Nathalie Dechy (Russia) Vera Zvonareva	6–7, 5–7
Win	2007	US Open	Hard	(France) Nathalie Dechy	(Chinese Taipei) Chan Yung-jan (Chinese Taipei) Chuang Chia-jung	6–4, 6–2

== Other significant finals ==
=== Olympics ===
==== Singles: 1 (silver medal) ====
Result	Year	Location	Surface	Opponent	Score
Silver	2008	Beijing Olympics	Hard	(Russia) Elena Dementieva	6–3, 5–7, 3–6

=== WTA 1000 ===
==== Singles: 8 (5 titles, 3 runner-ups) ====
Result	Year	Tournament	Surface	Opponent	Score
Loss	2006	Rome	Clay	(Switzerland) Martina Hingis	2–6, 5–7
Loss	2007	Charleston	Clay	(Serbia) Jelena Janković	2–6, 2–6
Win	2008	Berlin	Clay	(Russia) Elena Dementieva	3–6, 6–2, 6–2
Win	2008	Canada (Montréal)	Hard	(Slovakia) Dominika Cibulková	6–1, 6–2
Win	2008	Tokyo	Hard	(Russia) Svetlana Kuznetsova	6–1, 6–3
Win	2009	Rome	Clay	(Russia) Svetlana Kuznetsova	6–3, 6–2
Win	2009	Madrid	Clay	(Denmark) Caroline Wozniacki	6–2, 6–4
Loss	2009	Cincinnati	Hard	(Serbia) Jelena Janković	4–6, 2–6

==== Doubles: 1 (1 title) ====
Result	Year	Tournament	Surface	Partner	Opponents	Score
Win	2008	Indian Wells	Hard	(Russia) Elena Vesnina	(China) Yan Zi; (China) Zheng Jie	6–1, 1–6, [10–8]

== WTA Tour finals ==
=== Singles: 24 (12 titles, 12 runner-ups) ===
Legend Grand Slam tournaments (0–3) Olympics (0–1) WTA 1000 (Tier I / Premier 5 / Premier M) (5–3) WTA 500 (Tier II / Premier) (2–2) WTA 250 (5–3)	Surface Hard (5–5) Clay (6–5) Grass (0–2) Carpet (1)

Result	W–L	Date	Tournament	Tier	Surface	Opponent	Score
Win	1–0	Jul 2002	Orange Warsaw Open, Poland	Tier III	Clay	(Slovakia) Henrieta Nagyová	6–3, 4–0, ret.
Win	2–0	Jul 2003	Palermo International, Italy	Tier V	Clay	(Slovenia) Katarina Srebotnik	6–3, 6–4
Loss	2–1	Oct 2004	Luxembourg Open, Luxembourg	Tier III	Hard (i)	(Australia) Alicia Molik	3–6, 4–6
Win	3–1	Feb 2005	Open GDF Suez, France	Tier II	Carpet (i)	(France) Amélie Mauresmo	6–4, 2–6, 6–3
Win	4–1	May 2005	Prague Open, Czech Republic	Tier IV	Clay	(Czech Republic) Zuzana Ondrášková	7–6^{(7–2)}, 6–3
Loss	4–2	May 2006	Italian Open, Italy	Tier I	Clay	(Switzerland) Martina Hingis	2–6, 5–7
Loss	4–3	Jun 2006	Rosmalen Championships, Netherlands	Tier III	Grass	(Netherlands) Michaëlla Krajicek	3–6, 4–6
Win	5–3	Jan 2007	Australian Hard Court Championships, Australia	Tier III	Hard	(Switzerland) Martina Hingis	6–3, 3–6, 7–5
Loss	5–4	Apr 2007	Charleston Open, United States	Tier I	Clay	(Serbia) Jelena Janković	2–6, 2–6
Win	6–4	May 2008	Berlin Open, Germany	Tier I	Clay	(Russia) Elena Dementieva	3–6, 6–2, 6–2
Loss	6–5	Jun 2008	French Open, France	Grand Slam	Clay	(Serbia) Ana Ivanovic	4–6, 3–6
Loss	6–6	Jun 2008	Rosmalen Championships, Netherlands (2)	Tier III	Grass	(Thailand) Tamarine Tanasugarn	5–7, 3–6
Win	7–6	Jul 2008	LA Championships, United States	Tier II	Hard	(Italy) Flavia Pennetta	6–4, 6–2
Win	8–6	Aug 2008	Canadian Open, Canada	Tier I	Hard	(Slovakia) Dominika Cibulková	6–2, 6–1
Loss	8–7	Aug 2008	Summer Olympics, China	Olympics	Hard	(Russia) Elena Dementieva	6–3, 5–7, 3–6
Win	9–7	Sep 2008	Pan Pacific Open, Japan	Tier I	Hard	(Russia) Svetlana Kuznetsova	6–1, 6–3
Loss	9–8	Jan 2009	Sydney International, Australia	Premier	Hard	(Russia) Elena Dementieva	3–6, 6–2, 1–6
Loss	9–9	Jan 2009	Australian Open, Australia	Grand Slam	Hard	(United States) Serena Williams	0–6, 3–6
Loss	9–10	May 2009	Stuttgart Open, Germany	Premier	Clay (i)	(Russia) Svetlana Kuznetsova	4–6, 3–6
Win	10–10	May 2009	Italian Open, Italy	Premier 5	Clay	(Russia) Svetlana Kuznetsova	6–3, 6–2
Win	11–10	May 2009	Madrid Open, Spain	Premier M	Clay	(Denmark) Caroline Wozniacki	6–2, 6–4
Loss	11–11	Jun 2009	French Open, France (2)	Grand Slam	Clay	(Russia) Svetlana Kuznetsova	4–6, 2–6
Win	12–11	Jul 2009	Slovenia Open, Slovenia	International	Hard	(Italy) Sara Errani	6–7^{(5–7)}, 6–1, 7–5
Loss	12–12	Aug 2009	Cincinnati Open, United States	Premier 5	Hard	(Serbia) Jelena Janković	4–6, 2–6

=== Doubles: 16 (9 titles, 7 runner-ups) ===
Legend Grand Slam tournaments (1–1) WTA 1000 (Premier M) (1–0) WTA 500 (Tier II) (2–4) WTA 250 (5–2)	Surface Hard (7–6) Grass (1–0) Carpet (1–1)

Result	W–L	Date	Tournament	Tier	Surface	Partner	Opponent	Score
Loss	0–1	Jan 2003	Canberra International, Australia	Tier V	Hard	(Czech Republic) Dája Bedáňová	(Italy) Tathiana Garbin (France) Émilie Loit	3–6, 6–3, 4–6
Loss	0–2	Jan 2004	Sydney International, Australia	Tier II	Hard	(United States) Meghann Shaughnessy	(Zimbabwe) Cara Black; (Australia) Rennae Stubbs	5–7, 6–3, 4–6
Win	1–2	Sep 2004	China Open, China	Tier II	Hard	(Switzerland) Emmanuelle Gagliardi	(Argentina) Gisela Dulko; (Venezuela) María Vento-Kabchi	6–4, 6–4
Loss	1–3	Jan 2005	Hobart International, Australia	Tier V	Hard	(Spain) Anabel Medina Garrigues	(China) Yan Zi; (China) Zheng Jie	4–6, 5–7
Loss	1–4	Feb 2005	Open GDF Suez, France	Tier II	Hard (i)	(Spain) Anabel Medina Garrigues	(Czech Republic) Iveta Benešová; (Czech Republic) Květa Peschke	2–6, 6–2, 2–6
Loss	1–5	Feb 2005	Diamond Games, Belgium	Tier II	Carpet (i)	(Spain) Anabel Medina Garrigues	(Zimbabwe) Cara Black (Belgium) Els Callens	6–3, 4–6, 4–6
Win	2–5	Jun 2005	Rosmalen Championships, Netherlands	Tier III	Grass	(Spain) Anabel Medina Garrigues	(Czech Republic) Iveta Benešová (Spain) Nuria Llagostera Vives	6–4, 2–6, 7–6^{(13–11)}
Win	3–5	Jan 2006	Australian Hard Court Championships, Australia	Tier III	Hard	(United States) Meghann Shaughnessy	(Zimbabwe) Cara Black (Australia) Rennae Stubbs	6–2, 6–3
Win	4–5	Feb 2006	Diamond Games, Belgium	Tier II	Carpet (i)	(Slovenia) Katarina Srebotnik	(France) Stéphanie Foretz; (Netherlands) Michaëlla Krajicek	6–1, 6–1
Loss	4–6	Sep 2006	US Open, United States	Grand Slam	Hard	(Slovenia) Katarina Srebotnik	(France) Nathalie Dechy; (Russia) Vera Zvonareva	6–7^{(5–7)}, 5–7
Win	5–6	Jan 2007	Australian Hard Court Championships, Australia (2)	Tier III	Hard	(Slovenia) Katarina Srebotnik	(Czech Republic) Iveta Benešová; (Russia) Galina Voskoboeva	6–3, 6–4
Win	6–6	Sep 2007	US Open, United States	Grand Slam	Hard	(France) Nathalie Dechy	(Chinese Taipei) Chan Yung-jan; (Chinese Taipei) Chuang Chia-jung	6–4, 6–2
Loss	6–7	Oct 2007	Stuttgart Open, Germany	Tier II	Hard (i)	(Chinese Taipei) Chan Yung-jan	(Czech Republic) Květa Peschke (Australia) Rennae Stubbs	7–6^{(7–5)}, 6–7^{(4–7)}, [2–10]
Win	7–7	Jan 2008	Australian Hard Court Championships, Australia (3)	Tier III	Hard	(Hungary) Ágnes Szávay	(China) Yan Zi (China) Zheng Jie	6–1, 6–2
Win	8–7	Mar 2008	Indian Wells Open, United States	Premier M	Hard	(Russia) Elena Vesnina	(China) Yan Zi (China) Zheng Jie	6–1, 1–6, [10–8]
Win	9–7	Mar 2011	Malaysian Open, Malaysia	International	Hard	(Kazakhstan) Galina Voskoboeva	(Thailand) Noppawan Lertcheewakarn; (Australia) Jessica Moore	7–5, 2–6, [10–5]

== ITF Circuit finals ==
=== Singles: 5 (4 titles, 1 runner-up) ===
Legend
$10,000 tournaments

Result	W–L	Date	Tournament	Tier	Surface	Opponent	Score
Loss	0–1	Nov 2000	Mallorca, Spain	10,000	Clay	(Spain) Rosa María Andrés Rodríguez	3-5 2-4 4-0 4-2 3-5
Win	1–1	Mar 2001	Rome, Italy	10,000	Clay	(Bulgaria) Maria Geznenge	7–5, 6–0
Win	2–1	Feb 2002	Mallorca, Spain	10,000	Clay	(Georgia (country)) Margalita Chakhnashvili	6–3, 3–6, 7–5
Win	3–1	Feb 2002	Las Palmas, Spain	10,000	Clay	(Czech Republic) Libuše Průšová	2–6, 6–2, 6–1
Win	4–1	Mar 2002	Rome, Italy	10,000	Clay	(Croatia) Karolina Šprem	6–7^{(3)}, 6–2, 6–3

=== Doubles: 4 (3 titles, 1 runner-up) ===
Legend
$10,000 tournaments

Result	W–L	Date	Tournament	Tier	Surface	Partner	Opponents	Score
Loss	0–1	Jan 2001	Mallorca, Spain	10,000	Clay	(Russia) Raissa Gourevitch	(Italy) Germana Di Natale (Romania) Andreea Ehritt-Vanc	5–7, 6–3, 4–6
Win	1–1	Feb 2001	Mallorca, Spain	10,000	Clay	(Spain) Rosa María Andrés Rodríguez	(Romania) Oana Elena Golimbioschi (Romania) Andreea Ehritt-Vanc	6–2, 6–0
Win	2–1	Feb 2002	Mallorca, Spain	10,000	Clay	(Spain) Rosa María Andrés Rodríguez	(Austria) Jennifer Schmidt (Sweden) Maria Wolfbrandt	6–1, 6–2
Win	3–1	Mar 2002	Rome, Italy	10,000	Clay	(Italy) Claudia Ivone	(Italy) Silvia Disderi (Federal Republic of Yugoslavia) Milica Koprivica	6–4, 6–3

== WTA Tour career earnings ==
Year	Grand Slam titles (Note: Includes singles, doubles and mixed doubles titles.)	WTA titles	Total titles	Earnings ($)	Money list rank
2001–02	0	1	1	117,690	n/a
2003	0	1	1	188,874	62
2004	0	0	0	258,627	44
2005	0	2	2	478,417	28
2006	0	0	0	855,106	11
2007	0	1	1	1,017,267	11
2008	0	4	4	2,541,270	5
2009	0	3	3	4,310,218	2
2010	0	0	0	697,950	27
2011*	0	0	0	120,221	134
Career*	0	12	12	10,585,640	25

*As of October 31, 2011

== Record against top 10 players ==
=== Top 10 wins ===
Season	2005	2006	2007	2008	2009	2010	2011	Total
Wins	2	4	1	12	4	2	1	26

#	Player	Rk	Event	Surface	Rd	Score	Rk
2005
1.	(France) Amélie Mauresmo	4	Paris, France	Carpet (i)	F	6–4, 2–6, 6–3	48
2.	(Russia) Maria Sharapova	1	Moscow, Russia	Carpet (i)	QF	1–6, 6–4, 7–5	24
2006
3.	(Belgium) Kim Clijsters	2	Rome, Italy	Clay	3R	6–4, 7–6^{(7–2)}	19
4.	(Russia) Elena Dementieva	8	Rome, Italy	Clay	QF	6–1, 6–1	19
5.	(Russia) Svetlana Kuznetsova	10	Rome, Italy	Clay	SF	3–6, 6–4, 7–5	19
6.	(Russia) Maria Sharapova	4	French Open, Paris	Clay	4R	7–5, 2–6, 7–5	17
2007
7.	(Russia) Anna Chakvetadze	6	Moscow, Russia	Hard (i)	2R	7–6^{(8–6)}, 6–2	17
2008
8.	(Belgium) Justine Henin	1	Berlin, Germany	Clay	3R	5–7, 6–3, 6–1	17
9.	(United States) Serena Williams	6	Berlin, Germany	Clay	QF	2–6, 6–1, 7–6^{(7–5)}	17
10.	(Russia) Elena Dementieva	9	Berlin, Germany	Clay	F	3–6, 6–2, 6–2	17
11.	(Russia) Maria Sharapova	1	French Open, Paris	Clay	4R	6–7^{(6–8)}, 7–6^{(7–5)}, 6–2	14
12.	(Russia) Elena Dementieva	8	French Open, Paris	Clay	QF	4–6, 7–6^{(7–5)}, 6–0	14
13.	(Russia) Svetlana Kuznetsova	4	French Open, Paris	Clay	SF	6–3, 6–2	14
14.	(Russia) Elena Dementieva	5	Rosmalen, Netherlands	Grass	SF	6–3, 6–2	9
15.	(Serbia) Jelena Janković	2	Los Angeles, United States	Hard	SF	7–6^{(7–3)}, 6–1	9
16.	(Russia) Svetlana Kuznetsova	4	Montreal, Canada	Hard	QF	2–6, 6–3, 6–2	8
17.	(Serbia) Jelena Janković	1	Summer Olympics, Beijing	Hard	QF	6–2, 5–7, 6–3	6
18.	(Russia) Svetlana Kuznetsova	7	Tokyo, Japan	Hard	F	6–1, 6–3	5
19.	(Russia) Svetlana Kuznetsova	7	Moscow, Russia	Hard (i)	QF	6–4, 7–5	3
2009
20.	(Russia) Vera Zvonareva	7	Australian Open, Melbourne	Hard	SF	6–3, 7–6^{(7–4)}	3
21.	(United States) Venus Williams	5	Rome, Italy	Clay	SF	6–7^{(3–7)}, 6–3, 6–4	1
22.	(Russia) Svetlana Kuznetsova	8	Rome, Italy	Clay	F	6–3, 6–2	1
23.	(Belarus) Victoria Azarenka	9	French Open, Paris	Clay	QF	1–6, 6–4, 6–2	1
2010
24.	(Poland) Agnieszka Radwańska	10	Sydney, Australia	Hard	2R	7–5, 6–4	2
25.	(Italy) Francesca Schiavone	7	New Haven, United States	Hard	1R	1–6, 6–3, 6–1	59
2011
26.	(Australia) Samantha Stosur	4	Indian Wells, United States	Hard	3R	7–6^{(7–2)}, 6–4	108

== Longest winning streak ==
=== 16-match win streak (2009) ===
#	Tournament	Category	Start date	Surface	Rd	Opponent	Rank	Score
–	Stuttgart Open	Premier	27 April 2009	Clay (i)	F	(Russia) Svetlana Kuznetsova (5)	9	4–6, 3–6
1	Italian Open	Premier 5	4 May 2009	Clay	2R	(France) Virginie Razzano	35	7–6^{(7–1)}, 6–1
2	Italian Open	Premier 5	4 May 2009	Clay	3R	(China) Zheng Jie (14)	17	5–7, 6–1, 7–6^{(7–3)}
3	Italian Open	Premier 5	4 May 2009	Clay	QF	(Spain) María José Martínez Sánchez	48	4–6, 6–3, 6–0
4	Italian Open	Premier 5	4 May 2009	Clay	SF	(United States) Venus Williams (4)	5	6–7^{(3–7)}, 6–3, 6–4
5	Italian Open	Premier 5	4 May 2009	Clay	F	(Russia) Svetlana Kuznetsova (7)	8	6–3, 6–2
6	Madrid Open	Premier Mandatory	11 May 2009	Clay	2R	(China) Li Na	28	6–3, 7–6^{(7–2)}
7	Madrid Open	Premier Mandatory	11 May 2009	Clay	3R	(Czech Republic) Lucie Šafářová	50	6–0, 4–6, 6–3
8	Madrid Open	Premier Mandatory	11 May 2009	Clay	QF	(Ukraine) Alona Bondarenko	46	6–4, 6–3
9	Madrid Open	Premier Mandatory	11 May 2009	Clay	SF	(Switzerland) Patty Schnyder	20	6–4, 6–2
10	Madrid Open	Premier Mandatory	11 May 2009	Clay	F	(Denmark) Caroline Wozniacki (9)	11	6–2, 6–4
11	French Open	Grand Slam	24 May 2009	Clay	1R	(United Kingdom) Anne Keothavong	48	6–0, 6–0
12	French Open	Grand Slam	24 May 2009	Clay	2R	(Russia) Vitalia Diatchenko (Q)	153	6–1, 6–1
13	French Open	Grand Slam	24 May 2009	Clay	3R	(Russia) Anastasia Pavlyuchenkova (27)	27	6–2, 6–0
14	French Open	Grand Slam	24 May 2009	Clay	4R	(France) Aravane Rezaï	57	6–1, 6–0
15	French Open	Grand Slam	24 May 2009	Clay	QF	(Belarus) Victoria Azarenka (9)	9	1–6, 6–4, 6–2
16	French Open	Grand Slam	24 May 2009	Clay	SF	(Slovakia) Dominika Cibulková (20)	19	6–3, 6–3
–	French Open	Grand Slam	24 May 2009	Clay	F	(Russia) Svetlana Kuznetsova (7)	7	4–6, 2–6
