= 2008 Porsche Tennis Grand Prix – Doubles =

Doubles
- 2008 Porsche Tennis Grand Prix

Final
- Champions: (Germany) Anna-Lena Grönefeld (Switzerland) Patty Schnyder
- Runners-up: (Czech Republic) Květa Peschke (Australia) Rennae Stubbs
- Score: 6–2, 6–4

Details
- Draw: 16
- Seeds: 4

Events
| Singles | Doubles |
| ← 2007 · | Porsche Tennis Grand Prix | · 2009 → |

Květa Peschke and Rennae Stubbs were the defending champions and first seed, but Anna-Lena Grönefeld and Patty Schnyder, who entered the tournament with a wild card, defeated them 6–2, 6–4, in the final.

== Seeds ==
1. (Czech Republic) Květa Peschke / (Australia) Rennae Stubbs (final)
2. (Ukraine) Alona Bondarenko / (Ukraine) Kateryna Bondarenko (first round)
3. (Belarus) Victoria Azarenka / (Poland) Agnieszka Radwańska (semifinals)
4. (United States) Serena Williams / (United States) Venus Williams (quarterfinals, withdrew due to a left ankle injury for Serena Williams)

== Draw ==
=== Key ===
- Q = Qualifier
- WC = Wild card
- LL = Lucky loser
- Alt = Alternate
- ITF = ITF entry
- PR = Protected ranking
- SR = Special ranking
- SE = Special exempt
- JE = Junior exempt
- JR = Junior Accelerator Programme entrant
- CO = College Accelerator Programme entrant
- NG = Next Gen Accelerator Program entrant
- w/o = Walkover
- r = Retired
- d = Defaulted

=== Draw ===
First round
1 | (Czech Republic) K Peschke (Australia) R Stubbs | 6 | 6
(Poland) K Jans (Poland) A Rosolska | 1 | 1
WC | (Germany) A Petkovic (Germany) J Wöhr | 6 | 4 | [12]
(Czech Republic) E Birnerová (Czech Republic) V Uhlířová | 2 | 6 | [10]
4 | (United States) S Williams (United States) V Williams | 6 | 6
(Slovakia) D Hantuchová (Hungary) Á Szávay | 4 | 1
(Italy) ME Camerin (Italy) F Pennetta | 3 | 3
(Czech Republic) A Hlaváčková (Czech Republic) L Hradecká | 6 | 6
(Czech Republic) R Voráčová (Czech Republic) B Záhlavová-Strýcová | 7 | 6
(Slovakia) D Cibulková (Russia) N Petrova | 5 | 3
(Spain) N Llagostera Vives (Spain) A Parra Santonja | 6 | 4 | [9]
3 | (Belarus) V Azarenka (Poland) A Radwańska | 4 | 6 | [11]
(Bosnia and Herzegovina) M Jugić-Salkić (Czech Republic) G Navrátilová | 3 | 1
WC | (Germany) A-L Grönefeld (Switzerland) P Schnyder | 6 | 6
(Croatia) J Kostanić Tošić (Ukraine) T Perebiynis | 6^{7} | 6 | [10]
2 | (Ukraine) A Bondarenko (Ukraine) K Bondarenko | 7 | 1 | [8]

Quarterfinals
1 | (Czech Republic) K Peschke (Australia) R Stubbs | 6 | 6
WC | (Germany) A Petkovic (Germany) J Wöhr | 1 | 4
4 | (United States) S Williams (United States) V Williams
(Czech Republic) A Hlaváčková (Czech Republic) L Hradecká | w/o
(Czech Republic) R Voráčová (Czech Republic) B Záhlavová-Strýcová | 3 | 2
3 | (Belarus) V Azarenka (Poland) A Radwańska | 6 | 6
WC | (Germany) A-L Grönefeld (Switzerland) P Schnyder | 7 | 6
(Croatia) J Kostanić Tošić (Ukraine) T Perebiynis | 6^{4} | 2

Semifinals
1 | (Czech Republic) K Peschke (Australia) R Stubbs | 6 | 7
(Czech Republic) A Hlaváčková (Czech Republic) L Hradecká | 4 | 5
3 | (Belarus) V Azarenka (Poland) A Radwańska | 6 | 4 | [9]
WC | (Germany) A-L Grönefeld (Switzerland) P Schnyder | 2 | 6 | [11]

Final
1 | (Czech Republic) K Peschke (Australia) R Stubbs | 2 | 4
WC | (Germany) A-L Grönefeld (Switzerland) P Schnyder | 6 | 6
