= 2008 China Open =

2008 China Open can refer to:

- 2008 China Open (tennis), a tennis tournament
- 2008 China Open Super Series, a badminton tournament
- China Open 2008 (snooker), a snooker tournament
