= 2008 Porsche Tennis Grand Prix =

- Date: 27 September – 5 October
- Edition: 31st
- Category: Tier II Series
- Surface: Hard / indoor
- Location: Stuttgart, Germany
- Venue: Porsche Arena

Champions

Singles
- (Serbia) Jelena Janković

Doubles
- (Germany) Anna-Lena Grönefeld / (Switzerland) Patty Schnyder
← 2007 ·	Porsche Tennis Grand Prix	· 2009 →

The 2008 Porsche Tennis Grand Prix was a tennis tournament played on indoor hard courts. It was the 31st edition of the Porsche Tennis Grand Prix, and was part of the Tier II Series of the 2008 WTA Tour. It took place at the Porsche Arena in Stuttgart, Germany, from 27 September through 5 October 2008. Second-seeded Jelena Janković won the singles title.

== Finals ==
=== Singles ===
(Serbia) Jelena Janković defeated (Russia) Nadia Petrova 6–4, 6–3

- It was Janković's 2nd singles title of the year, and her 8th overall.

=== Doubles ===
(Germany) Anna-Lena Grönefeld / (Switzerland) Patty Schnyder defeated (Czech Republic) Květa Peschke / (Australia) Rennae Stubbs 6–2, 6–4
