= 2008 China Open – Women's doubles =

Women's doubles
- 2008 China Open

Final
- Champions: (Spain) Anabel Medina Garrigues (Denmark) Caroline Wozniacki
- Runners-up: (China) Han Xinyun (China) Xu Yifan
- Score: 6–1, 6–3

Events
Singles	men	women
Doubles	men	women
← 2007 ·	China Open	· 2009 →

Chuang Chia-jung and Hsieh Su-wei were the defending champions, but chose not to participate that year.

Anabel Medina Garrigues and Caroline Wozniacki won in the final 6–1, 6–3, against Han Xinyun and Xu Yifan.

== Seeds ==
1. (Slovenia) Katarina Srebotnik / (Japan) Ai Sugiyama (quarterfinals, retired due to a right wrist injury for Srebotnik)
2. (China) Yan Zi / (China) Zheng Jie (quarterfinals)
3. (China) Peng Shuai / (China) Sun Tiantian (first round)
4. (Czech Republic) Iveta Benešová / (Czech Republic) Vladimíra Uhlířová (first round)

== Draw ==
=== Key ===
- Q = Qualifier
- WC = Wild card
- LL = Lucky loser
- Alt = Alternate
- SE = Special exempt
- PR = Protected ranking
- ITF = ITF entry
- JE = Junior exempt
- w/o = Walkover
- r = Retired
- d = Defaulted
- SR = Special ranking

First round
1	(Slovenia) K Srebotnik (Japan) A Sugiyama	6	6
(China) C Ji (China) S Sun	3	3
WC	(China) J Lu (China) S Zhang	6	3	[10]
(Ukraine) M Koryttseva (Belarus) T Poutchek	4	6	[8]
4	(Czech Republic) I Benešová (Czech Republic) V Uhlířová	5	1
(France) A Cornet (Russia) A Pavlyuchenkova	7	6
WC	(Russia) A Chakvetadze (Slovakia) D Cibulková	3	2
(Spain) A Medina Garrigues (Denmark) C Wozniacki	6	6
(China) X Han (China) Y Xu	2	7	[10]
Alt	(China) Y Chen (China) C Liang	6	6^{8}	[5]
(Ukraine) O Savchuk (Turkey) İ Şenoğlu	7	6
3	(China) S Peng (China) T Sun	5	2
(United States) V King (Russia) A Kudryavtseva	6	3	[15]
(Kazakhstan) Y Shvedova (Thailand) T Tanasugarn	2	6	[17]
(Argentina) G Dulko (Poland) A Radwańska	4	4
2	(China) Z Yan (China) J Zheng	6	6

Quarterfinals
1	(Slovenia) K Srebotnik (Japan) A Sugiyama
WC	(China) J Lu (China) S Zhang	w/o
(France) A Cornet (Russia) A Pavlyuchenkova	3	5
(Spain) A Medina Garrigues (Denmark) C Wozniacki	6	7
(China) X Han (China) Y Xu	7	6
(Ukraine) O Savchuk (Turkey) İ Şenoğlu	5	4
(Kazakhstan) Y Shvedova (Thailand) T Tanasugarn	6	7
2	(China) Z Yan (China) J Zheng	4	5

Semifinals
WC	(China) J Lu (China) S Zhang	1	1
(Spain) A Medina Garrigues (Denmark) C Wozniacki	6	6
(China) X Han (China) Y Xu	3	6	[10]
(Kazakhstan) Y Shvedova (Thailand) T Tanasugarn	6	2	[3]

Final
(Spain) A Medina Garrigues (Denmark) C Wozniacki	6	6
(China) X Han (China) Y Xu	1	3
