= 2008 Toray Pan Pacific Open – Doubles =

Doubles
- 2008 Toray Pan Pacific Open

Final
- Champions: (United States) Vania King (Russia) Nadia Petrova
- Runners-up: (United States) Lisa Raymond (Australia) Samantha Stosur
- Score: 6–1, 6–4

Details
- Draw: 16
- Seeds: 4

Events
Singles	Doubles
← 2007 ·	Toray Pan Pacific Open	· 2009 →

Lisa Raymond and Samantha Stosur were the defending champions, but Vania King and Nadia Petrova defeated them 6–1, 6–4, in the final.

== Seeds ==
1. (Slovenia) Katarina Srebotnik / (Japan) Ai Sugiyama (first round)
2. (United States) Lisa Raymond / (Australia) Samantha Stosur (final)
3. (Australia) Casey Dellacqua / (Italy) Francesca Schiavone (semifinals)
4. (Chinese Taipei) Chia-jung Chuang / (Chinese Taipei) Su-wei Hsieh (semifinals)

== Draw ==
=== Key ===
- Q = Qualifier
- WC = Wild card
- LL = Lucky loser
- Alt = Alternate
- ITF = ITF entry
- PR = Protected ranking
- SR = Special ranking
- SE = Special exempt
- JE = Junior exempt
- JR = Junior Accelerator Programme entrant
- CO = College Accelerator Programme entrant
- NG = Next Gen Accelerator Program entrant
- w/o = Walkover
- r = Retired
- d = Defaulted

=== Draw ===
First round
1	(Slovenia) K Srebotnik (Japan) A Sugiyama	4	4
(United States) V King (Russia) N Petrova	6	6
(Kazakhstan) Y Shvedova (Thailand) T Tanasugarn	4	6	[10]
(Israel) S Pe'er (Denmark) C Wozniacki	6	2	[6]
4	(Chinese Taipei) C-j Chuang (Chinese Taipei) S-w Hsieh	7	7
(Hungary) M Czink (Slovenia) A Klepač	6^{7}	5
(United States) C Fusano (South Africa) N Grandin	7	1	[8]
(Russia) M Kirilenko (Italy) F Pennetta	5	6	[10]
WC	(Japan) K Date-Krumm (Japan) R Fujiwara	3	6	[8]
WC	(Russia) A Chakvetadze (Poland) A Radwańska	6	3	[10]
(Russia) V Dushevina (Czech Republic) V Uhlířová	6	5	[8]
3	(Australia) C Dellacqua (Italy) F Schiavone	4	7	[10]
(Slovakia) D Hantuchová (Hungary) Á Szávay	6	6
(Japan) A Morita (Japan) A Nakamura	2	3
(France) A Rezaï (India) S Uberoi	3	4
2	(United States) L Raymond (Australia) S Stosur	6	6

Quarterfinals
(United States) V King (Russia) N Petrova	6	6
(Kazakhstan) Y Shvedova (Thailand) T Tanasugarn	0	3
4	(Chinese Taipei) C-j Chuang (Chinese Taipei) S-w Hsieh	w/o
(Russia) M Kirilenko (Italy) F Pennetta
WC	(Russia) A Chakvetadze (Poland) A Radwańska	2	4
3	(Australia) C Dellacqua (Italy) F Schiavone	6	6
(Slovakia) D Hantuchová (Hungary) Á Szávay	7	3	[2]
2	(United States) L Raymond (Australia) S Stosur	5	6	[10]

Semifinals
(United States) V King (Russia) N Petrova	6	6
4	(Chinese Taipei) C-j Chuang (Chinese Taipei) S-w Hsieh	3	4
3	(Australia) C Dellacqua (Italy) F Schiavone	5	1
2	(United States) L Raymond (Australia) S Stosur	7	6

Final
(United States) V King (Russia) N Petrova	6	6
2	(United States) L Raymond (Australia) S Stosur	1	4
