= 2008 WTA Tour Championships – Doubles =

Doubles
- 2008 WTA Tour Championships

Final
- Champions: (Zimbabwe) Cara Black (United States) Liezel Huber
- Runners-up: (Czech Republic) Květa Peschke (Australia) Rennae Stubbs
- Score: 6–1, 7–5

Details
- Draw: 4
- Seeds: 4

Events
Singles	Doubles
- WTA Tour Championships

Defending champions Cara Black and Liezel Huber defeated Květa Peschke and Rennae Stubbs in the final, 6–1, 7–5 to win the doubles tennis title at the 2008 WTA Tour Championships.

== Seeds ==
1. (Zimbabwe) Cara Black / (United States) Liezel Huber (champions)
2. (Slovenia) Katarina Srebotnik / (Japan) Ai Sugiyama (semifinals)
3. (Czech Republic) Květa Peschke / (Australia) Rennae Stubbs (final)
4. (Spain) Anabel Medina Garrigues / (Spain) Virginia Ruano Pascual (semifinals)

== Draw ==
Key

- Q = Qualifier
- WC = Wild card
- LL = Lucky loser
- Alt = Alternate
- ITF = ITF entry
- PR = Protected ranking
- SR = Special ranking
- SE = Special exempt
- JE = Junior exempt
- JR = Junior Accelerator Programme entrant
- CO = College Accelerator Programme entrant
- NG = Next Gen Accelerator Program entrant
- w/o = Walkover
- r = Retired
- d = Defaulted

=== Draw ===
Semifinals
1	(Zimbabwe) Cara Black (United States) Liezel Huber	6	6
4	(Spain) Anabel Medina Garrigues (Spain) Virginia Ruano Pascual	1	3
3	(Czech Republic) Květa Peschke (Australia) Rennae Stubbs	6	2	[10]
2	(Slovenia) Katarina Srebotnik (Japan) Ai Sugiyama	3	6	4

Final
1	(Zimbabwe) Cara Black (United States) Liezel Huber	6	7
3	(Czech Republic) Květa Peschke (Australia) Rennae Stubbs	1	5
