= 2008 China Open (tennis) =

- Date: 22–28 September
- Edition: 10th (ATP); 12th (WTA)
- Category: International Series (ATP); Tier II Series (WTA)
- Surface: Hard / outdoor
- Location: Beijing, China
- Venue: Beijing Tennis Center

Champions

Men's singles
- (United States) Andy Roddick

Women's singles
- (Serbia) Jelena Janković

Men's doubles
- (Australia) Stephen Huss / (United Kingdom) Ross Hutchins

Women's doubles
- (Spain) Anabel Medina Garrigues / (Denmark) Caroline Wozniacki
← 2007 ·	China Open	· 2009 →

The 2008 China Open was a combined men's and women's tennis tournament played on outdoor hard courts. It was the 10th edition of the China Open for the men (the 12th for the women), and was part of the International Series of the 2008 ATP Tour, and of the Tier II Series of the 2008 WTA Tour. Both the men's and the women's events took place at the Beijing Tennis Center in Beijing, China, from 22 September through 28 September 2008.

The men's draw featured ATP No. 5, Australian Open and French Open quarterfinalist, Valencia and 's-Hertogenbosch winner David Ferrer, US Open quarterfinalist, Dubai, San Jose champion Andy Roddick, and Olympic silver medalist, Viña del Mar, Munich titlist, Beijing defending champion Fernando González. Also lined up were Stuttgart finalist Richard Gasquet, Umag winner Fernando Verdasco, Tommy Robredo, Rainer Schüttler and Sam Querrey.

The women's field featured WTA No. 2, US Open runner-up, Rome winner Jelena Janković, French Open, Indian Wells champion Ana Ivanovic, and Olympic silver medalist, French Open finalist, US Open semifinalist, Berlin, Montreal and Tokyo winner Dinara Safina. Also present were French Open semifinalist Svetlana Kuznetsova, Prague titlist Vera Zvonareva, Agnieszka Radwańska, Daniela Hantuchová, Anna Chakvetadze.

== Finals ==
=== Men's singles ===
(United States) Andy Roddick defeated (Israel) Dudi Sela, 6–4, 6–7^{(6–8)}, 6–3

- It was Roddick's 3rd title of the year, and his 26th overall.

=== Women's singles ===
(Serbia) Jelena Janković defeated (Russia) Svetlana Kuznetsova, 6–3, 6–2

- It was Janković's 2nd title of the year, and her 7th overall.

=== Men's doubles ===
(Australia) Stephen Huss / (United Kingdom) Ross Hutchins defeated (Australia) Ashley Fisher / (United States) Bobby Reynolds, 7–5, 6–4

=== Women's doubles ===
(Spain) Anabel Medina Garrigues / (Denmark) Caroline Wozniacki defeated (China) Han Xinyun / (China) Xu Yifan, 6–1, 6–3
