= 2008 China Open – Men's singles =

Men's singles
- 2008 China Open

Final
- Champion: (United States) Andy Roddick
- Runner-up: (Israel) Dudi Sela
- Score: 6–4, 6–7^{(6–8)}, 6–3

Details
- Draw: 28 (4Q / 3WC)
- Seeds: 8

Events
Singles	men	women
Doubles	men	women
- China Open

Fernando González was the defending champion, but lost in the quarterfinals to Björn Phau.

Second-seeded Andy Roddick won in the final 6–4, 6–7^{(6–8)}, 6–3, against Dudi Sela.

== Seeds ==
The top four seeds receive a bye into the second round.

1. (Spain) David Ferrer (second round)
2. (United States) Andy Roddick (champion)
3. (Chile) Fernando González (quarterfinals)
4. (France) Richard Gasquet (quarterfinals)
5. (Spain) Fernando Verdasco (second round)
6. (Spain) Tommy Robredo (quarterfinals)
7. (Germany) Rainer Schüttler (semifinals)
8. (United States) Sam Querrey (second round)

== Draw ==
Key

- Q = Qualifier
- WC = Wild card
- LL = Lucky loser
- Alt = Alternate
- ITF = ITF entry
- PR = Protected ranking
- SR = Special ranking
- SE = Special exempt
- JE = Junior exempt
- JR = Junior Accelerator Programme entrant
- CO = College Accelerator Programme entrant
- NG = Next Gen Accelerator Program entrant
- w/o = Walkover
- r = Retired
- d = Defaulted

=== Finals ===
Semifinals
(Israel) Dudi Sela	6	6
7	(Germany) Rainer Schüttler	3	3
(Germany) Björn Phau	2	7^{7}	1
2	(United States) Andy Roddick	6	6^{4}	6

Final
(Israel) Dudi Sela	4	7^{8}	3
2	(United States) Andy Roddick	6	6^{6}	6

=== Top half ===
First round
(France) N Devilder	4	3
(Israel) D Sela	6	6
(Czech Republic) I Minář	6	3	6
(South Korea) H-t Lee	3	6	2
(Spain) G García López	4	5
6	(Spain) T Robredo	6	7
Q	(China) J-c Xu	4	3
(Chinese Taipei) Y-h Lu	6	6
WC	(China) P Sun	4	6^{7}
Q	(Switzerland) J-C Scherrer	6	7^{9}
(Spain) I Navarro	6	3	4
7	(Germany) R Schüttler	2	6	6

Second round
1	(Spain) D Ferrer	3	3
(Israel) D Sela	6	6
(Czech Republic) I Minář	2	3
6	(Spain) T Robredo	6	6
4	(France) R Gasquet	7	6
(Chinese Taipei) Y-h Lu	5	1
Q	(Switzerland) J-C Scherrer	1	4
7	(Germany) R Schüttler	6	6

Quarterfinals
(Israel) D Sela	6	6
6	(Spain) T Robredo	4	1
4	(France) R Gasquet	6	3	4
7	(Germany) R Schüttler	4	6	6

Semifinals
(Israel) D Sela	6	6
7	(Germany) R Schüttler	3	3

=== Bottom half ===
First round
8	(United States) S Querrey	1	6	7^{7}
(United States) J Levine	6	2	6^{4}
(Germany) B Phau	6	6
Q	(South Korea) H-w Nam	1	3
WC	(China) Y Bai	4	5
(Japan) G Soeda	6	7
5/WC	(Spain) F Verdasco	6	6
(United States) B Reynolds	3	3
(Spain) JC Ferrero	6	6
(Russia) A Kudryavtsev	4	3
Q	(United States) B Evans	7^{7}	1	7^{12}
(Croatia) R Karanušić	6^{5}	6	6^{10}

Second round
8	(United States) S Querrey	7	3	4
(Germany) B Phau	5	6	6
(Japan) G Soeda	6	6^{4}	1
3	(Chile) F González	3	7^{7}	6
5/WC	(Spain) F Verdasco	5	4
(Spain) JC Ferrero	7	6
Q	(United States) B Evans	4	3
2	(United States) A Roddick	6	6

Quarterfinals
(Germany) B Phau	6	4	6
3	(Chile) F González	3	6	3
(Spain) JC Ferrero	6	3	4
2	(United States) A Roddick	2	6	6

Semifinals
(Germany) B Phau	2	7^{7}	1
2	(United States) A Roddick	6	6^{4}	6
