= 2008 Porsche Tennis Grand Prix – Singles =

Singles
- 2008 Porsche Tennis Grand Prix

Final
- Champion: (Serbia) Jelena Janković
- Runner-up: (Russia) Nadia Petrova
- Score: 6–4, 6–3

Details
- Draw: 28
- Seeds: 8

Events
Singles	Doubles
← 2007 ·	Porsche Tennis Grand Prix	· 2009 →

Justine Henin was the defending champion, but retired from the sport on May 14, 2008.

Jelena Janković won in the final 6–4, 6–3, against Nadia Petrova. Janković became the highest ranking singles player by winning the final.

== Seeds ==
The top four seeds received a bye into the second round.

1. (United States) Serena Williams (second round)
2. (Serbia) Jelena Janković (champion)
3. (Russia) Dinara Safina (quarterfinals)
4. (Russia) Elena Dementieva (quarterfinals)
5. (Russia) Svetlana Kuznetsova (first round)
6. (United States) Venus Williams (semifinals)
7. (Russia) Vera Zvonareva (quarterfinals)
8. (Poland) Agnieszka Radwańska (second round)

== Draw ==
=== Key ===
- Q = Qualifier
- WC = Wild card
- LL = Lucky loser
- Alt = Alternate
- ITF = ITF entry
- PR = Protected ranking
- SR = Special ranking
- SE = Special exempt
- JE = Junior exempt
- JR = Junior Accelerator Programme entrant
- CO = College Accelerator Programme entrant
- NG = Next Gen Accelerator Program entrant
- w/o = Walkover
- r = Retired
- d = Defaulted

=== Finals ===
Semifinals
(Russia) Nadia Petrova	6	6
(Belarus) Victoria Azarenka	4	4
6	(United States) Venus Williams	7	5	2
2	(Serbia) Jelena Janković	6^{8}	7	6

Final
(Russia) Nadia Petrova	4	3
2	(Serbia) Jelena Janković	6	6

=== Top half ===
First round
(Czech Republic) N Vaidišová	1	2
(China) N Li	6	6
(Russia) N Petrova	6	6
Q	(Czech Republic) B Záhlavová-Strýcová	2	2
(Switzerland) P Schnyder	6	4	7
5	(Russia) S Kuznetsova	4	6	5
WC	(Germany) T Malek	6	2	5
(Austria) S Bammer	4	6	7
(Belarus) V Azarenka	7	6
(Hungary) Á Szávay	5	3
Q	(Czech Republic) S Záhlavová	3	2
8	(Poland) A Radwańska	6	6

Second round
1	(United States) S Williams	6	1	4
(China) N Li	0	6	6
(Russia) N Petrova	6	6
(Switzerland) P Schnyder	4	1
4	(Russia) E Dementieva	6	6
(Austria) S Bammer	1	4
(Belarus) V Azarenka	6	7
8	(Poland) A Radwańska	1	5

Quarterfinals
(China) N Li	2	3
(Russia) N Petrova	6	6
4	(Russia) E Dementieva	6^{6}	6	1
(Belarus) V Azarenka	7	3	6

Semifinals
(Russia) N Petrova	6	6
(Belarus) V Azarenka	4	4

=== Bottom half ===
First round
6	(United States) V Williams	6	6
WC	(Germany) A-L Grönefeld	1	2
(Italy) F Pennetta	6	2	1
Q	(Ukraine) K Bondarenko	4	6	6
(France) A Cornet	2	1
Q	(Bulgaria) T Pironkova	6	6
7	(Russia) V Zvonareva	6	6
(Slovakia) D Hantuchová	3	2
(Slovakia) D Cibulková	3	1
(France) M Bartoli	6	6
WC	(Greece) E Daniilidou	6^{5}	1
(Ukraine) A Bondarenko	7	6

Second round
6	(United States) V Williams	6	6
Q	(Ukraine) K Bondarenko	4	2
Q	(Bulgaria) T Pironkova	1	6^{6}
3	(Russia) D Safina	6	7
7	(Russia) V Zvonareva	6	6
(France) M Bartoli	2	0
(Ukraine) A Bondarenko	2	0
2	(Serbia) J Janković	6	6

Quarterfinals
6	(United States) V Williams	6	6
3	(Russia) D Safina	4	2
7	(Russia) V Zvonareva	6^{8}	6^{5}
2	(Serbia) J Janković	7	7

Semifinals
6	(United States) V Williams	7	5	2
2	(Serbia) J Janković	6^{8}	7	6
