= 2008 China Open – Men's doubles =

Men's doubles
- 2008 China Open

Final
- Champions: (Australia) Stephen Huss (United Kingdom) Ross Hutchins
- Runners-up: (Australia) Ashley Fisher (United States) Bobby Reynolds
- Score: 7–5, 6–4

Events
Singles	men	women
Doubles	men	women
← 2007 ·	China Open	· 2009 →

Rik de Voest and Ashley Fisher are the defending champions, but de Voest chose not to participate, and only Fisher competed that year.
Fisher partnered with Bobby Reynolds, but Stephen Huss and Ross Hutchins defeated them 7–5, 6–4, in the final.

== Seeds ==
1. (Brazil) Marcelo Melo / (Brazil) Bruno Soares (quarterfinals)
2. (United States) Travis Parrott / (Slovakia) Filip Polášek (first round)
3. (Australia) Ashley Fisher / (United States) Bobby Reynolds (final)
4. (United States) James Cerretani / (Switzerland) Jean-Claude Scherrer (quarterfinals)

== Draw ==
=== Key ===
- Q = Qualifier
- WC = Wild card
- LL = Lucky loser
- Alt = Alternate
- SE = Special exempt
- PR = Protected ranking
- ITF = ITF entry
- JE = Junior exempt
- w/o = Walkover
- r = Retired
- d = Defaulted
- SR = Special ranking

=== Draw ===
First round
1	(Brazil) M Melo (Brazil) B Soares	6	6
ALT	(China) Y Wang (China) J-c Xu	4	4
(Germany) M Kohlmann (Germany) R Schüttler	6	6
(Croatia) R Karanušić (Czech Republic) I Minář	3	1
4	(United States) J Cerretani (Switzerland) J-C Scherrer	7	7^{9}
(France) N Devilder (Spain) T Robredo	6^{7}	5
(Australia) S Huss (United Kingdom) R Hutchins	6	7^{8}
(Spain) G García López (Spain) I Navarro	3	6^{6}
(Czech Republic) J Levinský (Chinese Taipei) Y-h Lu	4	6	[2]
WC	(China) X-y Yu (China) SX Zeng	6	3	[10]
(United States) J Levine (United States) J Thomas	2	5
3	(Australia) A Fisher (United States) B Reynolds	6	7
WC	(China) M-x Gong (China) Z Li	2	5
(Germany) F Moser (Germany) B Phau	6	7
(United States) E Butorac (United States) S Querrey	7^{7}	6
2	(United States) T Parrott (Slovakia) F Polášek	6^{2}	4

Quarterfinals
1	(Brazil) M Melo (Brazil) B Soares	6^{4}	3
(Germany) M Kohlmann (Germany) R Schüttler	7^{7}	6
4	(United States) J Cerretani (Switzerland) J-C Scherrer	3	2
(Australia) S Huss (United Kingdom) R Hutchins	6	6
WC	(China) X-y Yu (China) SX Zeng	5	4
3	(Australia) A Fisher (United States) B Reynolds	7	6
(Germany) F Moser (Germany) B Phau	7	6
(United States) E Butorac (United States) S Querrey	5	3

Semifinals
(Germany) M Kohlmann (Germany) R Schüttler	5	4
(Australia) S Huss (United Kingdom) R Hutchins	7	6
3	(Australia) A Fisher (United States) B Reynolds	6	6
(Germany) F Moser (Germany) B Phau	1	4

Final
(Australia) S Huss (United Kingdom) R Hutchins	7	6
3	(Australia) A Fisher (United States) B Reynolds	5	4
