= 2009 Porsche Tennis Grand Prix – Doubles =

Tennis Tournament

Doubles
- 2009 Porsche Tennis Grand Prix

Final
- Champion: (United States) Bethanie Mattek-Sands (Russia) Nadia Petrova
- Runner-up: (Argentina) Gisela Dulko (Italy) Flavia Pennetta
- Score: 5–7, 6–3, 10–7

Details
- Draw: 16
- Seeds: 4

Events
Singles	Doubles
- Porsche Tennis Grand Prix

Anna-Lena Grönefeld and Patty Schnyder were the defending champions, but lost in the first round to Iveta Benešová and Barbora Záhlavová-Strýcová.

== Seeds ==
1. (Zimbabwe) Cara Black / (United States) Liezel Huber (quarterfinals)
2. (Slovakia) Daniela Hantuchová / (Japan) Ai Sugiyama (first round)
3. (Spain) Virginia Ruano Pascual / (China) Zheng Jie (semifinals)
4. (Germany) Anna-Lena Grönefeld / (Switzerland) Patty Schnyder (first round)

== Draw ==
Key

- Q = Qualifier
- WC = Wild card
- LL = Lucky loser
- Alt = Alternate
- ITF = ITF entry
- PR = Protected ranking
- SR = Special ranking
- SE = Special exempt
- JE = Junior exempt
- JR = Junior Accelerator Programme entrant
- CO = College Accelerator Programme entrant
- NG = Next Gen Accelerator Program entrant
- w/o = Walkover
- r = Retired
- d = Defaulted

=== Draw ===
First round
1	(Zimbabwe) C Black (United States) L Huber	6	6
(Russia) V Dushevina (Slovakia) J Husárová	2	3
(Bosnia and Herzegovina) M Jugić-Salkić (Belarus) T Poutchek	0	5
(United States) B Mattek-Sands (Russia) N Petrova	6	7
3	(Spain) V Ruano Pascual (China) J Zheng	2	6	[10]
(Latvia) L Dekmeijere (China) S Peng	6	4	[7]
(United Kingdom) S Borwell (United States) R Kops-Jones	3	6	[10]
(Chinese Taipei) S-w Hsieh (South Africa) C Scheepers	6	3	[5]
(Italy) S Errani (Turkey) İ Şenoğlu	3	6	[8]
WC	(Germany) A Petkovic (Germany) J Wöhr	6	2	[10]
(Czech Republic) I Benešová (Czech Republic) B Záhlavová-Strýcová	6	6
4	(Germany) A-L Grönefeld (Switzerland) P Schnyder	0	4
(Spain) A Parra Santonja (Tunisia) S Sfar	4	2
(Argentina) G Dulko (Italy) F Pennetta	6	6
(United States) A Spears (China) T Sun	4	6	[10]
2	(Slovakia) D Hantuchová (Japan) A Sugiyama	6	2	[7]

Quarterfinals
1	(Zimbabwe) C Black (United States) L Huber	5	6	[7]
(United States) B Mattek-Sands (Russia) N Petrova	7	4	[10]
3	(Spain) V Ruano Pascual (China) J Zheng	7	6
(United Kingdom) S Borwell (United States) R Kops-Jones	5	4
WC	(Germany) A Petkovic (Germany) J Wöhr	7	6
(Czech Republic) I Benešová (Czech Republic) B Záhlavová-Strýcová	5	3
(Argentina) G Dulko (Italy) F Pennetta	6	6
(United States) A Spears (China) T Sun	1	3

Semifinals
(United States) B Mattek-Sands (Russia) N Petrova	7	2	[10]
3	(Spain) V Ruano Pascual (China) J Zheng	5	6	[6]
WC	(Germany) A Petkovic (Germany) J Wöhr	4	4
(Argentina) G Dulko (Italy) F Pennetta	6	6

Final
(United States) B Mattek-Sands (Russia) N Petrova	5	6	[10]
(Argentina) G Dulko (Italy) F Pennetta	7	3	[7]
