= 2008 WTA Tour Championships – Singles =

Singles
- 2008 WTA Tour Championships

Final
- Champion: (United States) Venus Williams
- Runner-up: (Russia) Vera Zvonareva
- Score: 6–7^{(5–7)}, 6–0, 6–2

Details
- Draw: 8 (RR + elimination)
- Seeds: 8

Events
Singles	Doubles
- WTA Tour Championships

Venus Williams defeated Vera Zvonareva in the final, 6–7^{(5–7)}, 6–0, 6–2 to win the singles tennis title at the 2008 WTA Tour Championships. It was her first Tour Finals title. Williams was the third player in the Open Era (after Steffi Graf and her sister Serena Williams) to defeat the top-three ranked players at the same event: defeating world No. 2 Dinara Safina and No. 3 Serena in the round-robin stage, and No. 1 Jelena Janković in the semifinals.

Justine Henin was the two-time reigning champion, but retired from the sport in May 2008.

Safina and Agnieszka Radwańska (as an alternate) made their tournament debuts.

== Seeds ==
1. (Serbia) Jelena Janković (semifinals)
2. (Russia) Dinara Safina (round robin)
3. (United States) Serena Williams (round robin, withdrew due to a stomach injury)
4. (Serbia) Ana Ivanovic (round robin, withdrew due to a virus)
5. (Russia) Elena Dementieva (semifinals)
6. (Russia) Svetlana Kuznetsova (round robin)
7. (United States) Venus Williams (champion)
8. (Russia) Vera Zvonareva (final)

== Alternates ==
1. (Poland) Agnieszka Radwańska (round robin, Replaced Ivanovic)
2. (Russia) Nadia Petrova (round robin, Replaced S.Williams)

== Draw ==
Key

- Q = Qualifier
- WC = Wild card
- LL = Lucky loser
- Alt = Alternate
- ITF = ITF entry
- PR = Protected ranking
- SR = Special ranking
- SE = Special exempt
- JE = Junior exempt
- JR = Junior Accelerator Programme entrant
- CO = College Accelerator Programme entrant
- NG = Next Gen Accelerator Program entrant
- w/o = Walkover
- r = Retired
- d = Defaulted

=== Finals ===
Semifinals
8	(Russia) Vera Zvonareva	7^{9}	3	6
5	(Russia) Elena Dementieva	6^{7}	6	3
7	(United States) Venus Williams	6	2	6
1	(Serbia) Jelena Janković	2	6	3

Final
8	(Russia) Vera Zvonareva	7^{7}	0	2
7	(United States) Venus Williams	6^{5}	6	6

=== White group ===
		(Serbia) Janković	(Serbia) Ivanovic (Poland) Radwańska	(Russia) Kuznetsova	(Russia) Zvonareva	RR; W–L	Set; W–L	Game; W–L	Standings
1	(Serbia) Jelena Janković		6–3, 6–4 (w/ Ivanovic)	7–6^{(8–6)}, 6–4	6–2, 3–6, 4–6	2–1	5–2 (71%)	38–31 (55%)	2
4 Alt	(Serbia) Ana Ivanovic (Poland) Agnieszka Radwańska	3–6, 4–6 (w/ Ivanovic)		6–2, 7–5 (w/ Radwańska)	3–6, 7–6^{(7–5)}, 4–6 (w/ Ivanovic)	0–2; 1–0	1–4 (20%); 2–0 (100%)	21–30 (41%); 13–7 (65%)	X 3
6	(Russia) Svetlana Kuznetsova	6–7^{(6–8)}, 4–6	2–6, 5–7 (w/ Radwańska)		2–6, 3–6	0–3	0–6 (0%)	22–38 (37%)	4
8	(Russia) Vera Zvonareva	2–6, 6–3, 6–4	6–3, 6–7^{(5–7)}, 6–4 (w/ Ivanovic)	6–2, 6–3		3–0	6–2 (75%)	44–32 (58%)	1

Standings are determined by: 1. number of wins; 2. number of matches; 3. in two-players-ties, head-to-head records; 4. in three-players-ties, percentage of sets won, or of games won; 5. steering-committee decision.

=== Maroon group ===
		(Russia) Safina	(United States) S Williams (Russia) Petrova	(Russia) Dementieva	(United States) V Williams	RR; W–L	Set; W–L	Game; W–L	Standings
2	(Russia) Dinara Safina		4–6, 1–6 (w/ Williams)	2–6, 4–6	5–7, 3–6	0–3	0–6 (0%)	19–37 (34%)	3
3 Alt	(United States) Serena Williams (Russia) Nadia Petrova	6–4, 6–1 (w/ Williams)		4–6, 6–4, 4–6 (w/ Petrova)	7–5, 1–6, 0–6 (w/ Williams)	1–1; 0–1	3–2 (60%); 1–2 (33%)	20–22 (48%); 14–16 (47%)	X 4
5	(Russia) Elena Dementieva	6–2, 6–4	6–4, 4–6, 6–4 (w/ Petrova)		4–6, 6–4, 3–6	2–1	5–3 (63%)	41–36 (53%)	2
7	(United States) Venus Williams	7–5, 6–3	5–7, 6–1, 6–0 (w/ Williams)	6–4, 4–6, 6–3		3–0	6–2 (75%)	46–29 (61%)	1

Standings are determined by: 1. number of wins; 2. number of matches; 3. in two-players-ties, head-to-head records; 4. in three-players-ties, percentage of sets won, or of games won; 5. steering-committee decision.

== See also ==
- WTA Tour Championships appearances
