= 2009 Porsche Tennis Grand Prix – Singles =

Singles
- 2009 Porsche Tennis Grand Prix

Final
- Champion: (Russia) Svetlana Kuznetsova
- Runner-up: (Russia) Dinara Safina
- Score: 6–4, 6–3

Details
- Draw: 32
- Seeds: 8

Events
Singles	Doubles
- Porsche Tennis Grand Prix

Svetlana Kuznetsova defeated Dinara Safina in the final, 6–4, 6–3 to win the singles tennis title at the 2009 Stuttgart Open. This was the first edition of the tournament played on clay courts, as opposed to hard courts.

Jelena Janković was the defending champion, but lost in the quarterfinals to Flavia Pennetta.

== Seeds ==
1. (Russia) Dinara Safina (final)
2. (Russia) Elena Dementieva (semifinals)
3. (Serbia) Jelena Janković (quarterfinals)
4. (Belarus) Victoria Azarenka (second round)
5. (Russia) Svetlana Kuznetsova (champion)
6. (Russia) Nadia Petrova (second round)
7. (Denmark) Caroline Wozniacki (second round)
8. (Poland) Agnieszka Radwańska (quarterfinals)

== Draw ==
Key

- Q = Qualifier
- WC = Wild card
- LL = Lucky loser
- Alt = Alternate
- ITF = ITF entry
- PR = Protected ranking
- SR = Special ranking
- SE = Special exempt
- JE = Junior exempt
- JR = Junior Accelerator Programme entrant
- CO = College Accelerator Programme entrant
- NG = Next Gen Accelerator Program entrant
- w/o = Walkover
- r = Retired
- d = Defaulted

=== Finals ===
Semifinals
1	(Russia) Dinara Safina	3	7	6
(Italy) Flavia Pennetta	6	5	0
5	(Russia) Svetlana Kuznetsova	6	6
2	(Russia) Elena Dementieva	4	2

Final
1	(Russia) Dinara Safina	4	3
5	(Russia) Svetlana Kuznetsova	6	6

=== Top half ===
First round
1	(Russia) D Safina	6	6
(Italy) S Errani	0	1
(France) A Cornet	3	1
(Slovakia) D Hantuchová	6	6
Q	(Bulgaria) T Pironkova	0	6	6
Q	(Italy) A Brianti	6	4	4
(Canada) A Wozniak	6^{2}	0
8	(Poland) A Radwańska	7	6
3	(Serbia) J Janković	6	6
(Slovakia) D Cibulková	1	1
WC	(Germany) S Lisicki	6	6
(Switzerland) P Schnyder	4	3
(Italy) F Pennetta	6	6
(Russia) A Chakvetadze	2	0
(China) J Zheng	4	7	4
6	(Russia) N Petrova	6	5	6

Second round
1	(Russia) D Safina	6	6
(Slovakia) D Hantuchová	4	2
Q	(Bulgaria) T Pironkova	3	3
8	(Poland) A Radwańska	6	6
3	(Serbia) J Janković	7	5	6
WC	(Germany) S Lisicki	5	7	3
(Italy) F Pennetta	6	6
6	(Russia) N Petrova	2	2

Quarterfinals
1	(Russia) D Safina	6	6
8	(Poland) A Radwańska	4	2
3	(Serbia) J Janković	6	4	4
(Italy) F Pennetta	2	6	6

Semifinals
1	(Russia) D Safina	3	7	6
(Italy) F Pennetta	6	5	0

=== Bottom half ===
First round
5	(Russia) S Kuznetsova	6	5	6
Q	(Germany) A Petkovic	4	7	1
(China) S Peng	2	3
(China) N Li	6	6
(Slovakia) M Rybáriková	3	3
(Argentina) G Dulko	6	6
(Spain) C Suárez Navarro	1	4
4	(Belarus) V Azarenka	6	6
7	(Denmark) C Wozniacki	6	7
(Czech Republic) I Benešová	3	5
(France) M Bartoli	6	2	6
Q	(Croatia) K Šprem	3	6	1
(Hungary) Á Szávay	6	2	7
(Japan) A Sugiyama	3	6	6^{4}
WC	(Germany) A-L Grönefeld	4	6	3
2	(Russia) E Dementieva	6	3	6

Second round
5	(Russia) S Kuznetsova	4	6	7
(China) N Li	6	4	5
(Argentina) G Dulko	6	6
4	(Belarus) V Azarenka	4	3
7	(Denmark) C Wozniacki	6^{6}	4
(France) M Bartoli	7	6
(Hungary) Á Szávay	6^{4}	1
2	(Russia) E Dementieva	7	6

Quarterfinals
5	(Russia) S Kuznetsova	6	6
(Argentina) G Dulko	3	2
(France) M Bartoli	2	6	3
2	(Russia) E Dementieva	6	4	6

Semifinals
5	(Russia) S Kuznetsova	6	6
2	(Russia) E Dementieva	4	2
