= 2008 China Open – Women's singles =

Women's singles
- 2008 China Open

Final
- Champion: (Serbia) Jelena Janković
- Runner-up: (Russia) Svetlana Kuznetsova
- Score: 6–3, 6–2

Details
- Seeds: 8

Events
| Singles | men | women |
| Doubles | men | women |
| ← 2007 · | China Open | · 2009 → |

Ágnes Szávay was the defending champion, but lost in the second round to Anabel Medina Garrigues.

First-seeded Jelena Janković won in the final 6–3, 6–2, against Svetlana Kuznetsova.

== Seeds ==
The top four seeds received a bye into the second round.

1. (Serbia) Jelena Janković (champion)
2. (Serbia) Ana Ivanovic (quarterfinals)
3. (Russia) Dinara Safina (withdrew due to a low back pain)
4. (Russia) Svetlana Kuznetsova (final)
5. (Russia) Vera Zvonareva (semifinals)
6. (Poland) Agnieszka Radwańska (first round)
7. (Slovakia) Daniela Hantuchová (quarterfinals)
8. (Russia) Anna Chakvetadze (second round)
9. (Denmark) Caroline Wozniacki (first round)

== Draw ==
=== Key ===
- Q = Qualifier
- WC = Wild card
- LL = Lucky loser
- Alt = Alternate
- SE = Special exempt
- PR = Protected ranking
- ITF = ITF entry
- JE = Junior exempt
- w/o = Walkover
- r = Retired
- d = Defaulted
- SR = Special ranking

=== Finals ===
Semifinals
1 | (Serbia) Jelena Janković | 6 | 2 | 6
5 | (Russia) Vera Zvonareva | 4 | 6 | 4
4 | (Russia) Svetlana Kuznetsova | 7 | 7
(China) Zheng Jie | 6^{3} | 5

Final
1 | (Serbia) Jelena Janković | 6 | 6
4 | (Russia) Svetlana Kuznetsova | 3 | 2

=== Top half ===
First round
(France) V Razzano | 7 | 5 | 4
Q | (Canada) A Wozniak | 6^{3} | 7 | 6
(Thailand) T Tanasugarn | 6 | 7
(Slovenia) K Srebotnik | 4 | 5
(Argentina) G Dulko | 3 | 1
7 | (Slovakia) D Hantuchová | 6 | 6
WC | (China) N Li | 1 | 6^{4}
(Italy) F Schiavone | 6 | 7
(Hungary) Á Szávay | 6 | 6
Q | (Kazakhstan) Y Shvedova | 4 | 3
(Spain) A Medina Garrigues | 7 | 6
9 | (Denmark) C Wozniacki | 6^{3} | 4

Second round
1 | (Serbia) J Janković | 6 | 7
Q | (Canada) A Wozniak | 3 | 5
(Thailand) T Tanasugarn | 1 | 6 | 5
7 | (Slovakia) D Hantuchová | 6 | 0 | 7
5 | (Russia) V Zvonareva | 7 | 6
(Italy) F Schiavone | 6^{5} | 2
(Hungary) Á Szávay | 2 | 2
(Spain) A Medina Garrigues | 6 | 6

Quarterfinals
1 | (Serbia) J Janković | 7 | 6
7 | (Slovakia) D Hantuchová | 5 | 1
5 | (Russia) V Zvonareva | 6 | 6
(Spain) A Medina Garrigues | 0 | 1

Semifinals
1 | (Serbia) J Janković | 6 | 2 | 6
5 | (Russia) V Zvonareva | 4 | 6 | 4

=== Bottom half ===
First round
8 | (Russia) A Chakvetadze | 6 | 7
LL | (Czech Republic) I Benešová | 4 | 5
(Slovakia) D Cibulková | 3 | 6 | 6
(France) A Mauresmo | 6 | 4 | 3
WC | (China) S Peng | 5 | 4
Q | (Russia) A Kudryavtseva | 7 | 6
6 | (Poland) A Radwańska | 2 | 3
(China) J Zheng | 6 | 6
WC | (China) Z Yan | 3 | 4
(Japan) A Sugiyama | 6 | 6
Q | (China) S Zhang | 1 | 6 | 6^{7}
(France) A Cornet | 6 | 3 | 7

Second round
8 | (Russia) A Chakvetadze | 3 | 2
(Slovakia) D Cibulková | 6 | 6
Q | (Russia) A Kudryavtseva | 2 | 3
4 | (Russia) S Kuznetsova | 6 | 6
(China) J Zheng | 6 | 6
(Japan) A Sugiyama | 1 | 2
(France) A Cornet | 1 | 6^{1}
2 | (Serbia) A Ivanovic | 6 | 7

Quarterfinals
(Slovakia) D Cibulková | 2 | 4
4 | (Russia) S Kuznetsova | 6 | 6
(China) J Zheng | 7 | 2 | 6
2 | (Serbia) A Ivanovic | 6^{4} | 6 | 4

Semifinals
4 | (Russia) S Kuznetsova | 7 | 7
(China) J Zheng | 6^{3} | 5
