= 2008 Family Circle Cup – Singles =

Singles
- 2008 Family Circle Cup

Final
- Champion: (United States) Serena Williams
- Runner-up: (Russia) Vera Zvonareva
- Score: 6–4, 3–6, 6–3

Details
- Draw: 56
- Seeds: 16

Events
Singles	Doubles
- Family Circle Cup

Serena Williams defeated Vera Zvonareva in the final, 6–4, 3–6, 6–3 to win the singles tennis title at the 2008 Family Circle Cup. This was Williams' third successive title in the 2008 season, and her first clay court title since the 2002 French Open.

Jelena Janković was the defending champion, but lost in the quarterfinals to Zvonareva.

== Seeds ==
The top 8 seeds received a bye into the second round.

1. (Serbia) Jelena Janković (quarterfinals)
2. (Russia) Maria Sharapova (quarterfinals)
3. (Russia) Anna Chakvetadze (second round)
4. (Russia) Elena Dementieva (semifinals)
5. (United States) Serena Williams (champion)
6. (France) Marion Bartoli (third round)
7. (Switzerland) Patty Schnyder (quarterfinals)
8. (Russia) Dinara Safina (third round)
9. (Russia) Vera Zvonareva (final)
10. (Hungary) Ágnes Szávay (quarterfinals)
11. (Poland) Agnieszka Radwańska (third round)
12. (Slovenia) Katarina Srebotnik (third round)
13. (Belarus) Victoria Azarenka (third round)
14. (Spain) Anabel Medina Garrigues (first round)
15. (Slovakia) Dominika Cibulková (first round)
16. (Netherlands) Michaëlla Krajicek (first round)

== Draw ==
=== Key ===
- Q = Qualifier
- WC = Wild card
- LL = Lucky loser
- w/o = Walkover
- r = Retired

=== Finals ===
Quarterfinals
1	(Serbia) Jelena Janković	2	6	2
9	(Russia) Vera Zvonareva	6	3	6
4	(Russia) Elena Dementieva	6	6
7	(Switzerland) Patty Schnyder	4	4
10	(Hungary) Ágnes Szávay	5	4
(France) Alizé Cornet	7	6
5	(United States) Serena Williams	7	4	6
2	(Russia) Maria Sharapova	5	6	1

Semifinals
9	(Russia) Vera Zvonareva	6	6^{2}	6
4	(Russia) Elena Dementieva	3	7^{7}	3
(France) Alizé Cornet	5	3
5	(United States) Serena Williams	7	6

Finals
9	(Russia) Vera Zvonareva	4	6	3
5	(United States) Serena Williams	6	3	6

=== Top half ===
==== Section 1 ====
First round
Q	(Russia) A Jidkova	6^{6}	1
Q	(United States) A Stevenson	7^{8}	6
(France) A Rezaï	6	4	7
(Venezuela) M Sequera	4	6	5
(Russia) A Rodionova	6	1
15	(Slovakia) D Cibulková	4	0	r
9	(Russia) V Zvonareva	6	6
Q	(Chinese Taipei) C-J Chuang	2	2
(Spain) V Ruano Pascual	4	7	6
(Russia) O Puchkova	6	5	0
(Australia) C Dellacqua	7	6
(Argentina) ME Salerni	5	4

Second round
1	(Serbia) J Janković	7	6
Q	(United States) A Stevenson	5	0
(France) A Rezaï	3	4
(Russia) A Rodionova	6	6
9	(Russia) V Zvonareva	6	6
(Spain) V Ruano Pascual	1	0
(Australia) C Dellacqua	5	6	1
6	(France) M Bartoli	7	4	6

Third round
1	(Serbia) J Janković	6	6
(Russia) A Rodionova	0	2
9	(Russia) V Zvonareva	6	4	6
6	(France) M Bartoli	4	6	1

Quarterfinals
1	(Serbia) J Janković	2	6	2
9	(Russia) V Zvonareva	6	3	6

==== Section 2 ====
First round
(United States) J Craybas	6	6
Q	(United States) V Lepchenko	2	2
WC	(United States) A Rolle	6	6^{1}	2
Q	(China) T Sun	2	7^{7}	6
Q	(South Africa) C Scheepers	1	0
13	(Belarus) V Azarenka	6	6
11	(Poland) A Radwańska	6	4	6
(Poland) M Domachowska	4	6	3
(United States) M Shaughnessy	3	0	r
(Romania) E Gallovits	6	3
(Russia) E Vesnina	3	2
(Belarus) O Govortsova	6	6

Second round
4	(Russia) E Dementieva	6	6
(United States) J Craybas	0	2
Q	(China) T Sun	6^{4}	0
13	(Belarus) V Azarenka	7^{7}	6
11	(Poland) A Radwańska	6^{7}	6	7
(Romania) E Gallovits	7^{9}	2	5
(Belarus) O Govortsova	6^{2}	0
7	(Switzerland) P Schnyder	7^{7}	6

Third round
4	(Russia) E Dementieva	6	7
13	(Belarus) V Azarenka	4	5
11	(Poland) A Radwańska	3	2
7	(Switzerland) P Schnyder	6	6

Quarterfinals
4	(Russia) E Dementieva	6	6
7	(Switzerland) P Schnyder	4	4

=== Bottom half ===
==== Section 3 ====
First round
(Spain) L Domínguez Lino	6	6
Q	(Canada) A Wozniak	1	1
(Japan) A Sugiyama	6	6
(Japan) A Morita	4	1
(Ukraine) Y Fedak	0	6^{4}
10	(Hungary) Á Szávay	6	7^{7}
16	(Netherlands) M Krajicek	3	6	4
(France) A Cornet	6	3	6
(Italy) S Errani	6	6
(United States) J Ditty	2	3
(Romania) S Cîrstea	6^{5}	7	6
WC	(United States) V King	7^{7}	5	1

Second round
8	(Russia) D Safina	6	6
(Spain) L Domínguez Lino	1	4
(Japan) A Sugiyama	5	6	4
10	(Hungary) Á Szávay	7	3	6
(France) A Cornet	6	2	6
(Italy) S Errani	3	6	3
(Romania) S Cîrstea	6	1	6
3	(Russia) A Chakvetadze	2	6	2

Third round
8	(Russia) D Safina	2	5
10	(Hungary) Á Szávay	6	7
(France) A Cornet	6	7
(Romania) S Cîrstea	1	5

Quarterfinals
10	(Hungary) Á Szávay	5	4
(France) A Cornet	7	6

==== Section 4 ====
First round
(Australia) A Molik	2	3
(Argentina) G Dulko	6	6
(Chinese Taipei) Y-J Chan	3	2
Q	(Czech Republic) B Záhlavová-Strýcová	6	6
(Switzerland) T Bacsinszky	6^{4}	3
12	(Slovenia) K Srebotnik	7^{7}	6
14	(Spain) A Medina Garrigues	6	0	5
(Ukraine) T Perebiynis	4	6	7
LL	(Germany) J Schruff	7^{7}	6
(Russia) G Voskoboeva	6^{2}	4
(China) M Yuan	3	6	2
WC	(United States) B Mattek	6	4	6

Second round
5	(United States) S Williams	6	6
(Argentina) G Dulko	3	4
Q	(Czech Republic) B Záhlavová-Strýcová	6	1	5
12	(Slovenia) K Srebotnik	4	6	7
(Ukraine) T Perebiynis	6	6
LL	(Germany) J Schruff	4	3
WC	(United States) B Mattek	0	0
2	(Russia) M Sharapova	6	6

Third round
5	(United States) S Williams	4	6	6
12	(Slovenia) K Srebotnik	6	4	3
(Ukraine) T Perebiynis	5	2
2	(Russia) M Sharapova	7	6

Quarterfinals
5	(United States) S Williams	7	4	6
2	(Russia) M Sharapova	5	6	1
