= 2008 Rogers Cup – Singles =

Singles
- 2008 Rogers Cup

Final
- Champion: (Russia) Dinara Safina
- Runner-up: (Slovakia) Dominika Cibulková
- Score: 6–2, 6–1

Details
- Draw: 56
- Seeds: 16

Events
Singles	Doubles
- Rogers Cup

Dinara Safina defeated Dominika Cibulková in the final, 6–2, 6–1 to win the women's singles tennis title at the 2008 Canadian Open.

Justine Henin was the reigning champion, but retired from professional tennis in May 2008.

== Seeds ==
The top eight seeds received a bye into the second round.

1. (Serbia) Ana Ivanovic (third round)
2. (Serbia) Jelena Janković (quarterfinals)
3. (Russia) Maria Sharapova (third round, withdrew due to a right shoulder injury)
4. (Russia) Svetlana Kuznetsova (quarterfinals)
5. (Russia) Elena Dementieva (second round)
6. (Russia) Anna Chakvetadze (third round)
7. (Russia) Dinara Safina (champion)
8. (Russia) Vera Zvonareva (second round)
9. (Switzerland) Patty Schnyder (third round)
10. (France) Marion Bartoli (semifinals)
11. (Belarus) Victoria Azarenka (semifinals)
12. (Russia) Nadia Petrova (third round)
13. (Russia) Maria Kirilenko (second round)
14. (Italy) Francesca Schiavone (first round)
15. (Italy) Flavia Pennetta (second round)
16. (Czech Republic) Nicole Vaidišová (first round)

== Draw ==
Key

- Q = Qualifier
- WC = Wild card
- LL = Lucky loser
- Alt = Alternate
- ITF = ITF entry
- PR = Protected ranking
- SR = Special ranking
- SE = Special exempt
- JE = Junior exempt
- JR = Junior Accelerator Programme entrant
- CO = College Accelerator Programme entrant
- NG = Next Gen Accelerator Program entrant
- w/o = Walkover
- r = Retired
- d = Defaulted

=== Finals ===
Quarterfinals
(Austria) Tamira Paszek	4	5
11	(Belarus) Victoria Azarenka	6	7
4	(Russia) Svetlana Kuznetsova	6	3	2
7	(Russia) Dinara Safina	2	6	6
10	(France) Marion Bartoli	6	6
(Japan) Ai Sugiyama	2	3
(Slovakia) Dominika Cibulková	7	6
2	(Serbia) Jelena Janković	5	2

Semifinals
11	(Belarus) Victoria Azarenka	0	6	3
7	(Russia) Dinara Safina	6	2	6
10	(France) Marion Bartoli	6	4	3
(Slovakia) Dominika Cibulková	4	6	6

Final
7	(Russia) Dinara Safina	6	6
(Slovakia) Dominika Cibulková	2	1

=== Top half ===
==== Section 1 ====
First round
(Japan) A Nakamura	2	4
(Czech Republic) P Kvitová	6	6
Q	(Hungary) M Czink	7	6
Q	(United States) J Ditty	6^{4}	0
(Austria) T Paszek	7	1	6
14	(Italy) F Schiavone	6^{4}	6	1
11	(Belarus) V Azarenka	6	6
Q	(United States) J Jackson	1	1
Q	(Australia) M Adamczak	7	1	2
(Austria) S Bammer	6^{6}	6	6
(France) V Razzano	6	6
(France) A Rezaï	1	2

Second round
1	(Serbia) A Ivanovic	6	4	6
(Czech Republic) P Kvitová	3	6	3
Q	(Hungary) M Czink	4	5
(Austria) T Paszek	6	7
11	(Belarus) V Azarenka	6	6
(Austria) S Bammer	2	2
(France) V Razzano	6	1	7
8	(Russia) V Zvonareva	3	6	6^{2}

Third round
1	(Serbia) A Ivanovic	2	6	2
(Austria) T Paszek	6	1	6
11	(Belarus) V Azarenka	7	2
(France) V Razzano	6^{4}	0	r

Quarterfinals
(Austria) T Paszek	4	5
11	(Belarus) V Azarenka	6	7

==== Section 2 ====
First round
Q	(Russia) A Kudryavtseva	6	7
Q	(South Africa) C Scheepers	3	6^{1}
(United States) V King	6	3	3
Q	(Portugal) M Larcher de Brito	2	6	6
LL	(Ukraine) O Savchuk	6	5	3
15	(Italy) F Pennetta	1	7	6
9	(Switzerland) P Schnyder	7	3
Q	(China) M Yuan	6^{6}	2	r
(Romania) M Niculescu	6	6
Q	(United States) V Lepchenko	1	2
(Russia) A Rodionova	6	6
Q	(Zimbabwe) C Black	2	2

Second round
4	(Russia) S Kuznetsova	6	1
Q	(Russia) A Kudryavtseva	1	0	r
Q	(Portugal) M Larcher de Brito	6	0	6
15	(Italy) F Pennetta	3	6	3
9	(Switzerland) P Schnyder	6	7
(Romania) M Niculescu	1	5
(Russia) A Rodionova	2	4
7	(Russia) D Safina	6	6

Third round
4	(Russia) S Kuznetsova	7	2	6
Q	(Portugal) M Larcher de Brito	5	6	4
9	(Switzerland) P Schnyder	2	2
7	(Russia) D Safina	6	6

Quarterfinals
4	(Russia) S Kuznetsova	6	3	2
7	(Russia) D Safina	2	6	6

=== Bottom half ===
==== Section 3 ====
First round
(United States) J Craybas	6	6
WC	(Canada) S Fichman	4	3
Q	(United States) A Rolle	4	2
(Russia) A Kleybanova	6	6
Q	(United Kingdom) M South	3	7	0
10	(France) M Bartoli	6	6^{5}	6
16	(Czech Republic) N Vaidišová	3	6	2
(Japan) A Sugiyama	6	3	6
(Germany) S Lisicki	3	4
(Israel) S Pe'er	6	6
(United States) B Mattek	5	2
(Poland) M Domachowska	7	6

Second round
6	(Russia) A Chakvetadze	6	7
(United States) J Craybas	2	5
(Russia) A Kleybanova
10	(France) M Bartoli	w/o
(Japan) A Sugiyama	6	6
(Israel) S Pe'er	2	2
(Poland) M Domachowska	5	7	2
3	(Russia) M Sharapova	7	5	6

Third round
6	(Russia) A Chakvetadze	6	5	6^{4}
10	(France) M Bartoli	4	7	7
(Japan) A Sugiyama	w/o
3	(Russia) M Sharapova

Quarterfinals
10	(France) M Bartoli	6	6
(Japan) A Sugiyama	2	3

==== Section 4 ====
First round
(Slovakia) D Cibulková	6	6
(Russia) E Vesnina	1	1
(Thailand) T Tanasugarn	6	6
(France) O Sanchez	3	1
WC	(Canada) M-È Pelletier	0	1
12	(Russia) N Petrova	6	6
13	(Russia) M Kirilenko	6	7
(United Kingdom) A Keothavong	1	5
(Belarus) O Govortsova	1	2	r
WC	(Canada) S Dubois	6	4
(Chinese Taipei) Y-j Chan	2	6	5
(Canada) A Wozniak	6	1	7

Second round
5	(Russia) E Dementieva	4	2
(Slovakia) D Cibulková	6	6
(Thailand) T Tanasugarn	3	2
12	(Russia) N Petrova	6	6
13	(Russia) M Kirilenko	2	6	6^{4}
WC	(Canada) S Dubois	6	2	7
(Canada) A Wozniak	0	4
2	(Serbia) J Janković	6	6

Third round
(Slovakia) D Cibulková	7	6
12	(Russia) N Petrova	6^{2}	2
WC	(Canada) S Dubois	3	2
2	(Serbia) J Janković	6	6

Quarterfinals
(Slovakia) D Cibulková	7	6
2	(Serbia) J Janković	5	2
