= 2009 Porsche Tennis Grand Prix =

- Date: 27 April – 3 May
- Edition: 32nd
- Category: Premier tournaments
- Draw: 32S / 16D
- Prize money: $700,000
- Surface: Clay / indoor
- Location: Stuttgart, Germany
- Venue: Porsche Arena

Champions

Singles
- (Russia) Svetlana Kuznetsova

Doubles
- (United States) Bethanie Mattek-Sands / (Russia) Nadia Petrova
- Porsche Tennis Grand Prix

The 2009 Porsche Tennis Grand Prix was a women's tennis tournament, for the first time played on indoor clay courts. It was the 32nd edition of the Porsche Tennis Grand Prix, and was part of the Premier tournaments category of the 2009 WTA Tour. It took place at the Porsche Arena in Stuttgart, Germany, from 27 April through 3 May 2009. Fifth-seeded Svetlana Kuznetsova won the singles title.

== Finals ==
=== Singles ===
(Russia) Svetlana Kuznetsova defeated (Russia) Dinara Safina, 6–4, 6–3

- It was Kuznetsova's first singles title of the year and 10th of her career.

=== Doubles ===
(United States) Bethanie Mattek-Sands / (Russia) Nadia Petrova defeated (Argentina) Gisela Dulko / (Italy) Flavia Pennetta, 5–7, 6–3, 10–7

== Entrants ==
=== Seeds ===
Player	Nationality	Ranking*	Seeding
Dinara Safina	Russia	1	1
Elena Dementieva	Russia	3	2
Jelena Janković	Serbia	4	3
Victoria Azarenka	Belarus	8	4
Svetlana Kuznetsova	Russia	9	5
Nadia Petrova	Russia	10	6
Caroline Wozniacki	Denmark	11	7
Agnieszka Radwańska	Poland	12	8

- Rankings as of 27 April 2009.

=== Other entrants ===
The following players received wildcards into the main draw:

- (Germany) Sabine Lisicki
- (Germany) Anna-Lena Grönefeld

The following players received entry from the qualifying draw:

- (Bulgaria) Tsvetana Pironkova
- (Italy) Alberta Brianti
- (Croatia) Karolina Šprem
- (Germany) Andrea Petkovic
