= 2008 Qatar Telecom German Open – Singles =

Tennis tournament

Singles
- 2008 Qatar Telecom German Open

Final
- Champion: (Russia) Dinara Safina
- Runner-up: (Russia) Elena Dementieva
- Score: 3–6, 6–2, 6–2

Details
- Draw: 56 (4WC/8Q/1LL)
- Seeds: 16

Events
Singles	Doubles
- German Open

Dinara Safina defeated Elena Dementieva in the final, 3–6, 6–2, 6–2 to win the singles tennis title at the 2008 WTA German Open.

Ana Ivanovic was the defending champion, but was defeated in the semifinals by Dementieva.

This was the last tournament in which incumbent world No. 1 Justine Henin participated before announcing her retirement. She was defeated in the third round by Safina.

== Seeds ==
The top 8 seeds received a bye into the second round.

1. (Belgium) Justine Henin (third round)
2. (Serbia) Ana Ivanovic (semifinals)
3. (Russia) Svetlana Kuznetsova (third round)
4. (Serbia) Jelena Janković (quarterfinals)
5. (United States) Serena Williams (quarterfinals)
6. (Russia) Anna Chakvetadze (second round)
7. (Russia) Elena Dementieva (final)
8. (France) Marion Bartoli (third round)
9. (Switzerland) Patty Schnyder (first round)
10. (Hungary) Ágnes Szávay (quarterfinals)
11. (Poland) Agnieszka Radwańska (third round)
12. (Czech Republic) Nicole Vaidišová (first round)
13. (Russia) Dinara Safina (champion)
14. (Israel) Shahar Pe'er (first round)
15. (Ukraine) Alona Bondarenko (quarterfinals)
16. (Russia) Nadia Petrova (second round)

== Draw ==
=== Key ===
- Q = Qualifier
- WC = Wild card
- LL = Lucky loser
- r = Retired
- w/o = Walkover

=== Finals ===
Quarterfinals
13	(Russia) Dinara Safina	2	6	7
5	(United States) Serena Williams	6	1	6^{5}
15	(Ukraine) Alona Bondarenko	6^{2}	2
(Belarus) Victoria Azarenka	7	6
7	(Russia) Elena Dementieva	6	2	6
4	(Serbia) Jelena Janković	3	6	3
10	(Hungary) Ágnes Szávay	6	4	3
2	(Serbia) Ana Ivanovic	3	6	6

Semifinals
13	(Russia) Dinara Safina	6	6
(Belarus) Victoria Azarenka	4	1
7	(Russia) Elena Dementieva	6	7
2	(Serbia) Ana Ivanovic	2	5

Finals
13	(Russia) Dinara Safina	3	6	6
7	(Russia) Elena Dementieva	6	2	2

=== Top half ===
==== Section 1 ====
First round
(France) P Parmentier	5	6	4
Q	(Chinese Taipei) Y-J Chan	7	2	6
(Italy) K Knapp	0	1
Q	(Estonia) K Kanepi	6	6
WC	(Germany) J Görges	3	4
13	(Russia) D Safina	6	6
11	(Poland) A Radwańska	6	5
WC	(Germany) A Kerber	0	3	r
Q	(Belarus) E Dzehalevich	6^{7}	6	3
Q	(Germany) A Bachmann	7	3	6
(Italy) F Schiavone	7	4	6
(France) A Cornet	5	6	3

Second round
1	(Belgium) J Henin	6	6
Q	(Chinese Taipei) Y-J Chan	0	2
Q	(Estonia) K Kanepi	4	3
13	(Russia) D Safina	6	6
11	(Poland) A Radwańska	6	6
Q	(Germany) A Bachmann	1	1
(Italy) F Schiavone	2	3
5	(United States) S Williams	6	6

Third round
1	(Belgium) J Henin	7	3	1
13	(Russia) D Safina	5	6	6
11	(Poland) A Radwańska	3	1
5	(United States) S Williams	6	6

Quarterfinals
13	(Russia) D Safina	2	6	7
5	(United States) S Williams	6	1	6^{5}

==== Section 2 ====
First round
Q	(Colombia) C Castaño	6	6
Q	(Russia) G Voskoboeva	2	2
(Italy) T Garbin	6	5	2^{r}
(Spain) A Medina Garrigues	3	7	2
(Slovakia) D Cibulková	4	6	6^{9}
15	(Ukraine) A Bondarenko	6	1	7
12	(Czech Republic) N Vaidišová	6	1	2
(Argentina) G Dulko	4	6	6
(Denmark) C Wozniacki	7	6
(France) T Golovin	6^{4}	2
(Belarus) V Azarenka	6	6
(Australia) C Dellacqua	2	2

Second round
3	(Russia) S Kuznetsova	6	6
Q	(Colombia) C Castaño	3	2
(Spain) A Medina Garrigues	5	6	3
15	(Ukraine) A Bondarenko	7	0	6
(Argentina) G Dulko	6	7
(Denmark) C Wozniacki	2	5
(Belarus) V Azarenka	1	7	6
6	(Russia) A Chakvetadze	6	6^{1}	4

Third round
3	(Russia) S Kuznetsova	6	2	2
15	(Ukraine) A Bondarenko	1	6	6
(Argentina) G Dulko	3	1
(Belarus) V Azarenka	6	6

Quarterfinals
15	(Ukraine) A Bondarenko	6^{2}	2
(Belarus) V Azarenka	7	6

=== Bottom half ===
==== Section 3 ====
First round
(Ukraine) K Bondarenko	6	6
(Austria) T Paszek	4	3
(Belarus) O Govortsova	0	0
Q	(Russia) A Kleybanova	6	6
(Russia) V Dushevina	6	6
9	(Switzerland) P Schnyder	2	3
16	(Russia) N Petrova	7	3	7
(Slovenia) K Srebotnik	6^{5}	6	6^{2}
(Russia) M Kirilenko	2	7	6
(Russia) E Vesnina	6	5	2
(China) S Peng	7	5	6
Q	(United States) J Craybas	6^{4}	7	0

Second round
7	(Russia) E Dementieva	6	6
(Ukraine) K Bondarenko	1	2
Q	(Russia) A Kleybanova	2	6	3
(Russia) V Dushevina	6	4	6
16	(Russia) N Petrova	3	3
(Russia) M Kirilenko	6	6
(China) S Peng	5	0
4	(Serbia) J Janković	7	6

Third round
7	(Russia) E Dementieva	7	6
(Russia) V Dushevina	5	3
(Russia) M Kirilenko	2	4
4	(Serbia) J Janković	6	6

Quarterfinals
7	(Russia) E Dementieva	6	2	6
4	(Serbia) J Janković	3	6	3

==== Section 4 ====
First round
(France) V Razzano	4	5
(Czech Republic) L Šafářová	6	7
WC	(Germany) M Müller	2	3
(China) Z Yan	6	6
(Venezuela) M Sequera	2	0	r
10	(Hungary) Á Szávay	6	3
14	(Israel) S Pe'er	5	1
WC	(Germany) S Lisicki	7	6
(Austria) S Bammer	6	6
(Netherlands) M Krajicek	1	2
LL	(Uzbekistan) A Amanmuradova	7	7
(France) A Rezaï	5	5

Second round
8	(France) M Bartoli	6	6
(Czech Republic) L Šafářová	0	3
(China) Z Yan	1	1
10	(Hungary) Á Szávay	6	6
WC	(Germany) S Lisicki	3	6	6^{5}
(Austria) S Bammer	6	1	7
LL	(Uzbekistan) A Amanmuradova	6^{0}	2
2	(Serbia) A Ivanovic	7	6

Third round
8	(France) M Bartoli	5	5
10	(Hungary) Á Szávay	7	7
(Austria) S Bammer	5	6	4
2	(Serbia) A Ivanovic	7	4	6

Quarterfinals
10	(Hungary) Á Szávay	6	4	3
2	(Serbia) A Ivanovic	3	6	6

== Qualifying ==
=== Qualifying seeds ===
1. (Czech Republic) Klára Zakopalová (first round)
2. (Estonia) Kaia Kanepi (qualified)
3. (Ukraine) Mariya Koryttseva (first round)
4. (United States) Jill Craybas (qualified)
5. (Uzbekistan) Akgul Amanmuradova (qualifying competition, lucky loser)
6. (Bulgaria) Tsvetana Pironkova (qualifying competition)
7. (Russia) Alisa Kleybanova (qualified)
8. (Spain) Virginia Ruano Pascual (first round)
9. (Russia) Anastasia Rodionova (first round)
10. (Spain) Nuria Llagostera Vives (first round)
11. (Russia) Ekaterina Makarova (qualifying competition)
12. (Switzerland) Timea Bacsinszky (qualifying competition)
13. (Chinese Taipei) Chan Yung-jan (qualified)
14. (Russia) Galina Voskoboeva (qualified)
15. (Paraguay) ~~Rossana de los Ríos~~ (withdrew)
16. (Israel) Tzipora Obziler (qualifying competition)
17. (Japan) Ayumi Morita (first round)

=== Qualifiers ===
1. (Colombia) Catalina Castaño
2. (Estonia) Kaia Kanepi
3. (Russia) Galina Voskoboeva
4. (United States) Jill Craybas
5. (Germany) Angelika Bachmann
6. (Chinese Taipei) Chan Yung-jan
7. (Russia) Alisa Kleybanova
8. (Belarus) Ekaterina Dzehalevich

=== Lucky loser ===
1. (Uzbekistan) Akgul Amanmuradova

=== Qualifying draws ===
==== First qualifier ====
First round
1	(Czech Republic) Klára Zakopalová	6	2	3
(Colombia) Catalina Castaño	4	6	6
Alt	(Russia) Alina Jidkova	2	4
11	(Russia) Ekaterina Makarova	6	6

Qualifying competition
(Colombia) Catalina Castaño	6	6
11	(Russia) Ekaterina Makarova	3	1

==== Second qualifier ====
First round
2	(Estonia) Kaia Kanepi	7	6
(Slovenia) Andreja Klepač	5	2
(Germany) Julia Schruff	6^{6}	5
16	(Israel) Tzipora Obziler	7^{8}	7

Qualifying competition
2	(Estonia) Kaia Kanepi	7^{7}	6
16	(Israel) Tzipora Obziler	6^{2}	3

==== Third qualifier ====
First round
3	(Ukraine) Mariya Koryttseva	3	2
WC	(Russia) Ksenia Pervak	6	6
(Germany) Sandra Klösel	3	6	5
14	(Russia) Galina Voskoboeva	6	2	7

Qualifying competition
WC	(Russia) Ksenia Pervak	6	1	3
14	(Russia) Galina Voskoboeva	4	6	6

==== Fourth qualifier ====
First round
4	(United States) Jill Craybas	0	6	6
(Italy) Maria Elena Camerin	6	4	3
WC	(Germany) Vanessa Henke	3	2
12	(Switzerland) Timea Bacsinszky	6	6

Qualifying competition
4	(United States) Jill Craybas	2	7^{7}	7^{7}
12	(Switzerland) Timea Bacsinszky	6	6^{2}	6^{3}

==== Fifth qualifier ====
First round
5	(Uzbekistan) Akgul Amanmuradova	2	6	6
Alt	(Spain) María José Martínez Sánchez	6	4	1
WC	(Germany) Angelika Bachmann	7	6
10	(Spain) Nuria Llagostera Vives	5	1

Qualifying competition
5	(Uzbekistan) Akgul Amanmuradova	4	4
WC	(Germany) Angelika Bachmann	6	6

==== Sixth qualifier ====
First round
6	(Bulgaria) Tsvetana Pironkova	6	6
(Belarus) Tatiana Poutchek	3	4
(Ukraine) Yuliana Fedak	6	5	1
13	(Chinese Taipei) Chan Yung-jan	2	7	6

Qualifying competition
6	(Bulgaria) Tsvetana Pironkova	2	5
13	(Chinese Taipei) Chan Yung-jan	6	7

==== Seventh qualifier ====
First round
7	(Russia) Alisa Kleybanova	6	4	6
(China) Yuan Meng	2	6	1
(United States) Julie Ditty	7^{7}	6
17	(Japan) Ayumi Morita	6^{2}	1

Qualifying competition
7	(Russia) Alisa Kleybanova	6	6
(United States) Julie Ditty	3	0

==== Eighth qualifier ====
First round
8	(Spain) Virginia Ruano Pascual	2	4
WC	(Germany) Kristina Barrois	6	6
Alt	(Belarus) Ekaterina Dzehalevich	6	6
9	(Russia) Anastasia Rodionova	4	3

Qualifying competition
WC	(Germany) Kristina Barrois	6	4	2
Alt	(Belarus) Ekaterina Dzehalevich	3	6	6
