= 2008 Toray Pan Pacific Open – Singles =

Singles
- 2008 Toray Pan Pacific Open

Final
- Champion: (Russia) Dinara Safina
- Runner-up: (Russia) Svetlana Kuznetsova
- Score: 6–1, 6–3

Details
- Draw: 28 (4 Q / 3 WC )
- Seeds: 8

Events
Singles	Doubles
← 2007 ·	Pan Pacific Open	· 2009 →

Dinara Safina defeated Svetlana Kuznetsova in the final, 6–1, 6–3 to win the singles tennis title at the 2008 Pan Pacific Open. It was her fourth title of the season.

Martina Hingis was the reigning champion, but she retired from professional tennis the previous year.

This was the first edition of the Pan Pacific Open to be held on outdoor hard courts; the tournament had previously been held on indoor carpet courts.

== Seeds ==
The top four seeds receive a bye into the second round.

1. (Serbia) Jelena Janković (quarterfinals)
2. (Serbia) Ana Ivanovic (second round)
3. (Russia) Elena Dementieva (quarterfinals)
4. (Russia) Dinara Safina (champion)
5. (Russia) Svetlana Kuznetsova (final)
6. (Poland) Agnieszka Radwańska (quarterfinals)
7. (Slovakia) Daniela Hantuchová (first round)
8. (Russia) Anna Chakvetadze (first round)

== Draw ==
=== Key ===
- Q = Qualifier
- WC = Wild card
- LL = Lucky loser
- Alt = Alternate
- ITF = ITF entry
- PR = Protected ranking
- SR = Special ranking
- SE = Special exempt
- JE = Junior exempt
- JR = Junior Accelerator Programme entrant
- CO = College Accelerator Programme entrant
- NG = Next Gen Accelerator Program entrant
- w/o = Walkover
- r = Retired
- d = Defaulted

=== Finals ===
Semifinals
5	(Russia) Svetlana Kuznetsova	7^{7}	6
Q	(Slovenia) Katarina Srebotnik	6^{5}	2
4	(Russia) Dinara Safina	6	6
(Russia) Nadia Petrova	1	0

Final
5	(Russia) Svetlana Kuznetsova	1	3
4	(Russia) Dinara Safina	6	6

=== Top half ===
First round
(Italy) F Pennetta	6	6
(Israel) S Pe'er	4	4
WC	(Japan) A Morita	6^{7}	7	6
(Hungary) Á Szávay	7^{9}	5	4
(China) N Li	2	6	3
5	(Russia) S Kuznetsova	6	1	6
(France) A Cornet	4	6	6
Q	(Canada) A Wozniak	6	3	3
(Denmark) C Wozniacki	1	2
Q	(Slovenia) K Srebotnik	6	6
(Italy) F Schiavone	6	7
7	(Slovakia) D Hantuchová	1	5

Second round
1	(Serbia) J Janković	6	6
(Italy) F Pennetta	2	1
WC	(Japan) A Morita	1	1
5	(Russia) S Kuznetsova	6	6
3	(Russia) E Dementieva	6	6
(France) A Cornet	0	3
Q	(Slovenia) K Srebotnik	6	6
(Italy) F Schiavone	4	3

Quarterfinals
1	(Serbia) J Janković	6	5	5
5	(Russia) S Kuznetsova	2	7	7
3	(Russia) E Dementieva	3	4
Q	(Slovenia) K Srebotnik	6	6

Semifinals
5	(Russia) S Kuznetsova	7^{7}	6
Q	(Slovenia) K Srebotnik	6^{5}	2

=== Bottom half ===
First round
8	(Russia) A Chakvetadze	4	6	3
Q	(Estonia) K Kanepi	6	3	6
(France) V Razzano	6	6
(Japan) A Sugiyama	3	2
(Slovakia) D Cibulková	0	6	7^{10}
WC	(France) A Mauresmo	6	1	6^{8}
6	(Poland) A Radwańska	6	6
WC	(Japan) A Nakamura	1	4
(Russia) M Kirilenko	2	2
(France) M Bartoli	6	6
Q	(France) A Rezaï	5	2
(Russia) N Petrova	7	6

Second round
Q	(Estonia) K Kanepi	6	6
(France) V Razzano	4	2
(Slovakia) D Cibulková	3	4
4	(Russia) D Safina	6	6
6	(Poland) A Radwańska	6	6
(France) M Bartoli	2	3
(Russia) N Petrova	6	1	6
2	(Serbia) A Ivanovic	1	6	2

Quarterfinals
Q	(Estonia) K Kanepi	4	7^{7}	2
4	(Russia) D Safina	6	6^{5}	6
6	(Poland) A Radwańska	3	0
(Russia) N Petrova	6	6

Semifinals
4	(Russia) D Safina	6	6
(Russia) N Petrova	1	0
