= 2008 Toray Pan Pacific Open =

- Date: 15–21 September
- Edition: 25th
- Category: Tier I
- Draw: 28S / 16D
- Prize money: $1,340,000
- Surface: Hard / outdoor
- Location: Tokyo, Japan
- Venue: Ariake Coliseum

Champions

Singles
- (Russia) Dinara Safina

Doubles
- (United States) Vania King / (Russia) Nadia Petrova
← 2007 ·	Pan Pacific Open	· 2009 →

The 2008 Toray Pan Pacific Open was a women's tennis tournament played on outdoor hard courts. It was the 25th edition of the Toray Pan Pacific Open, and was part of the Tier I Series of the 2008 WTA Tour. It took place at the Ariake Coliseum in Tokyo, Japan, from September 15 through September 21, 2008. Fourth-seeded Dinara Safina won the singles title.

== Finals ==
=== Singles ===
(Russia) Dinara Safina defeated (Russia) Svetlana Kuznetsova, 6–1, 6–3

- It was Safina's 4th title of the year, and her 9th overall. It was her 3rd Tier I title of the year, and overall.

=== Doubles ===
(United States) Vania King / (Russia) Nadia Petrova defeated (United States) Lisa Raymond / (Australia) Samantha Stosur, 6–1, 6–4
