= 2008 Rogers Cup =

- Date: July 19–27 (men); July 26 – August 3 (women)
- Edition: 119th (men) / 107th (women)
- Category: Masters Series (men); Tier I Series (women)
- Surface: Hard / outdoor
- Location: Toronto (men); Montreal (women); Canada

Champions

Men's singles
- (Spain) Rafael Nadal

Women's singles
- (Russia) Dinara Safina

Men's doubles
- (Canada) Daniel Nestor / (Serbia) Nenad Zimonjić

Women's doubles
- (Zimbabwe) Cara Black / (United States) Liezel Huber
- Canadian Open

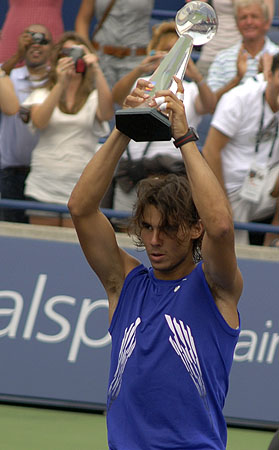
Men's singles champion Rafael Nadal

The 2008 Canada Masters (also known as the 2008 Rogers Masters and 2008 Rogers Cup for sponsorship reasons) was a tennis tournament played on outdoor hard courts. It was the 119th edition of the Canada Masters for the men (the 107th edition for the women), and was part of the ATP Masters Series of the 2008 ATP Tour, and of the Tier I Series of the 2008 WTA Tour. The men's event took place at the Rexall Centre in Toronto, Ontario, Canada, from July 19 through July 27, 2008, and the women's event at the Uniprix Stadium in Montreal, Quebec, Canada, from July 26 through August 3, 2008. The event was scheduled two weeks earlier than the usual early-August date to avoid conflicting with the 2008 Summer Olympics.

The men's field featured World No. 1, French Open and Wimbledon runner-up Roger Federer, ATP No. 2, French Open and new Wimbledon winner Rafael Nadal, and Australian Open titlist and Canada Masters defending champion Novak Djokovic. Also competing were ATP No. 4, Miami Masters, Pörtschach and Warsaw titlist Nikolay Davydenko, Valencia and s'Hertogenbosch winner David Ferrer, Andy Roddick, James Blake and Andy Murray.

On the women's side were present World No. 1 and French Open champion Ana Ivanovic, Rome Tier I winner and 2007 Canada Masters runner-up Jelena Janković, and reigning Australian Open champion Maria Sharapova. Other top seeded players were French Open semifinalist Svetlana Kuznetsova, Wimbledon semifinalist and Dubai titlist Elena Dementieva, Anna Chakvetadze, Dinara Safina and Vera Zvonareva.

== Finals ==
=== Men's singles ===
(Spain) Rafael Nadal defeated (Germany) Nicolas Kiefer 6–3, 6–2

- It was Rafael Nadal's 7th title of the year, and his 30th overall. It was his 3rd Masters title of the year, his 12th overall, and his 2nd win at the event.

=== Women's singles ===
(Russia) Dinara Safina defeated (Slovakia) Dominika Cibulková 6–2, 6–1

- It was Dinara Safina's 3rd title of the year, and her 8th overall. It was her 2nd Tier I title of the year, and overall.

=== Men's doubles ===
(Canada) Daniel Nestor / (Serbia) Nenad Zimonjić defeated (United States) Bob Bryan / (United States) Mike Bryan 6–2, 4–6, [10–6]

=== Women's doubles ===
(Zimbabwe) Cara Black / (United States) Liezel Huber defeated (Russia) Maria Kirilenko / (Italy) Flavia Pennetta 6–1, 6–1
