= 2021 Zavarovalnica Sava Portorož – Doubles =

Doubles
- 2021 Zavarovalnica Sava Portorož

Final
- Champions: (Russia) Anna Kalinskaya (Slovakia) Tereza Mihalíková
- Runners-up: (Serbia) Aleksandra Krunić (Netherlands) Lesley Pattinama Kerkhove
- Score: 4–6, 6–2, [12–10]

Events
Singles	Doubles
← 2010 ·	WTA Slovenia Open	· 2022 →

Maria Kondratieva and Vladimíra Uhlířová were the champions from the previous edition in 2010, but both players retired from professional tennis in 2016.

Anna Kalinskaya and Tereza Mihalíková won the title, defeating Aleksandra Krunić and Lesley Pattinama Kerkhove in the final, 4–6, 6–2, [12–10].

== Seeds ==
1. (Slovenia) Andreja Klepač / (Slovenia) Tamara Zidanšek (semifinals)
2. (Serbia) Aleksandra Krunić / (Netherlands) Lesley Pattinama Kerkhove (final)
3. (Kazakhstan) Anna Danilina / (Hungary) Fanny Stollár (quarterfinals)
4. (Poland) Katarzyna Piter / (United Kingdom) Heather Watson (first round)

== Draw ==
=== Key ===
- Q = Qualifier
- WC = Wild card
- LL = Lucky loser
- Alt = Alternate
- SE = Special exempt
- PR = Protected ranking
- ITF = ITF entry
- JE = Junior exempt
- w/o = Walkover
- r = Retired
- d = Defaulted
- SR = Special ranking

=== Draw ===
First round
1	(Slovenia) A Klepač (Slovenia) T Zidanšek	4	6	[10]
(Russia) N Dzalamidze (Slovenia) K Juvan	6	2	[8]
(France) E Cascino (Italy) C Rosatello	6^{2}	2
(Switzerland) S Bandecchi (Italy) L Stefanini	7^{7}	6
4	(Poland) K Piter (United Kingdom) H Watson	5	3
(United States) E Bektas (United Kingdom) T Moore	7	6
WC	(Slovenia) Ž Falkner (Slovenia) P Lovrič	1	2
(Russia) A Kalinskaya (Slovakia) T Mihalíková	6	6
(Montenegro) D Kovinić (Czech Republic) R Voráčová	6	5	[10]
(Russia) A Fomina-Klotz (Russia) E Yashina	3	7	[8]
WC	(Slovenia) T Cvetkovič (Slovenia) EN Milić	1	0
3	(Kazakhstan) A Danilina (Hungary) F Stollár	6	6
(Italy) L Bronzetti (Slovenia) N Radišić	6	6
(India) R Bhosale (United Kingdom) E Webley-Smith	4	4
(United Kingdom) S Murray Sharan (Switzerland) C Perrin	1	1
2	(Serbia) A Krunić (Netherlands) L Pattinama Kerkhove	6	6

Quarterfinals
1	(Slovenia) A Klepač (Slovenia) T Zidanšek	7	6
(Switzerland) S Bandecchi (Italy) L Stefanini	5	4
(United States) E Bektas (United Kingdom) T Moore	4	3
(Russia) A Kalinskaya (Slovakia) T Mihalíková	6	6
(Montenegro) D Kovinić (Czech Republic) R Voráčová	6	7^{7}
3	(Kazakhstan) A Danilina (Hungary) F Stollár	4	6^{3}
(Italy) L Bronzetti (Slovenia) N Radišić	4	4
2	(Serbia) A Krunić (Netherlands) L Pattinama Kerkhove	6	6

Semifinals
1	(Slovenia) A Klepač (Slovenia) T Zidanšek	4	6^{7}
(Russia) A Kalinskaya (Slovakia) T Mihalíková	6	7^{9}
(Montenegro) D Kovinić (Czech Republic) R Voráčová	4	3
2	(Serbia) A Krunić (Netherlands) L Pattinama Kerkhove	6	6

Final
(Russia) A Kalinskaya (Slovakia) T Mihalíková	4	6	[12]
2	(Serbia) A Krunić (Netherlands) L Pattinama Kerkhove	6	2	[10]
