= 2021 Zavarovalnica Sava Portorož – Singles =

Singles
- 2021 Zavarovalnica Sava Portorož

Final
- Champion: (Italy) Jasmine Paolini
- Runner-up: (United States) Alison Riske
- Score: 7–6^{(7–4)}, 6–2

Details
- Draw: 32
- Seeds: 8

Events
Singles	Doubles
- WTA Slovenia Open

Anna Chakvetadze was the champion when the event was last held in 2010, but she retired from professional tennis in 2013.

Jasmine Paolini won her maiden WTA Tour title, defeating Alison Riske in the final, 7–6^{(7–4)}, 6–2.

== Seeds ==
1. (Croatia) Petra Martić (first round)
2. (Kazakhstan) Yulia Putintseva (semifinals)
3. (United States) Alison Riske (final)
4. (Romania) Sorana Cîrstea (quarterfinals)
5. (Slovenia) Tamara Zidanšek (quarterfinals)
6. (Ukraine) Dayana Yastremska (first round, retired)
7. (Sweden) Rebecca Peterson (first round)
8. (Croatia) Donna Vekić (first round)

== Draw ==
Key

- Q = Qualifier
- WC = Wild card
- LL = Lucky loser
- Alt = Alternate
- ITF = ITF entry
- PR = Protected ranking
- SR = Special ranking
- SE = Special exempt
- JE = Junior exempt
- JR = Junior Accelerator Programme entrant
- CO = College Accelerator Programme entrant
- NG = Next Gen Accelerator Program entrant
- w/o = Walkover
- r = Retired
- d = Defaulted

=== Finals ===
Semifinals
(Slovenia) Kaja Juvan	0	4
3	(United States) Alison Riske	6	6
(Italy) Jasmine Paolini	1	6	6
2	(Kazakhstan) Yulia Putintseva	6	3	4

Final
3	(United States) Alison Riske	6^{4}	2
(Italy) Jasmine Paolini	7^{7}	6

=== Top half ===
First round
1	(Croatia) P Martić	3	4
(Slovenia) K Juvan	6	6
Q	(Serbia) A Krunić	6	6
WC	(Slovenia) Ž Falkner	3	1
(Italy) S Errani	6^{3}	2
(Ukraine) A Kalinina	7^{7}	6
Q	(Italy) C Ferrando	1	1
5	(Slovenia) T Zidanšek	6	6
3	(United States) A Riske	7	6
WC	(Slovenia) P Lovrič	5	3
Q	(Slovakia) V Kužmová	6	6
Q	(Croatia) T Mrdeža	2	3
WC	(Slovenia) N Radišić	6	1	2
(France) K Mladenovic	4	6	6
(Croatia) A Konjuh	0	6	6
8	(Croatia) D Vekić	6	3	2

Second round
(Slovenia) K Juvan	7^{7}	6
Q	(Serbia) A Krunić	6^{1}	4
(Ukraine) A Kalinina
5	(Slovenia) T Zidanšek	w/o
3	(United States) A Riske	3	6	6
Q	(Slovakia) V Kužmová	6	3	3
(France) K Mladenovic	6	6
(Croatia) A Konjuh	0	4

Quarterfinals
(Slovenia) K Juvan	7^{7}	6
5	(Slovenia) T Zidanšek	6^{4}	3
3	(United States) A Riske	6	6
(France) K Mladenovic	4	1

Semifinals
(Slovenia) K Juvan	0	4
3	(United States) A Riske	6	6

=== Bottom half ===
First round
6	(Ukraine) D Yastremska	6^{5}	1^{r}
(Italy) J Paolini	7^{7}	4
(Montenegro) D Kovinić	0	4
(Russia) A Kalinskaya	6	6
(Czech Republic) T Martincová	6	6
(Slovakia) K Kučová	4	1
(United Kingdom) H Watson	1	3
4	(Romania) S Cîrstea	6	6
7	(Sweden) R Peterson	3	3
Q	(Italy) L Bronzetti	6	6
(United States) B Pera	6	6
(France) F Ferro	4	3
(Ukraine) K Zavatska	5	3
Q	(United Kingdom) K Boulter	7	6
(Romania) J Cristian	4	4
2	(Kazakhstan) Y Putintseva	6	6

Second round
(Italy) J Paolini	6	6
(Russia) A Kalinskaya	3	2
(Czech Republic) T Martincová	5	2
4	(Romania) S Cîrstea	7	6
Q	(Italy) L Bronzetti	2	6	6
(United States) B Pera	6	3	3
Q	(United Kingdom) K Boulter	3	1
2	(Kazakhstan) Y Putintseva	6	6

Quarterfinals
(Italy) J Paolini	6	4	6
4	(Romania) S Cîrstea	4	6	1
Q	(Italy) L Bronzetti	3	2
2	(Kazakhstan) Y Putintseva	6	6

Semifinals
(Italy) J Paolini	1	6	6
2	(Kazakhstan) Y Putintseva	6	3	4

== Qualifying ==
=== Seeds ===
1. (Netherlands) Lesley Pattinama Kerkhove (first round)
2. (Slovakia) Viktória Kužmová (qualified)
3. (United States) Grace Min (first round, retired)
4. (Italy) Lucia Bronzetti (qualified)
5. (Serbia) Aleksandra Krunić (qualified)
6. (United Kingdom) Katie Boulter (qualified)
7. (Italy) Lucrezia Stefanini (qualifying competition)
8. (Poland) Urszula Radwańska (first round, retired)
9. (Switzerland) Susan Bandecchi (qualifying competition)
10. (Croatia) Tereza Mrdeža (qualified)
11. (Belarus) Yuliya Hatouka (qualifying competition)
12. (Romania) Irina Fetecău (qualifying competition)

=== Qualifiers ===
1. (Italy) Cristiana Ferrando
2. (Slovakia) Viktória Kužmová
3. (Croatia) Tereza Mrdeža
4. (Italy) Lucia Bronzetti
5. (Serbia) Aleksandra Krunić
6. (United Kingdom) Katie Boulter

=== Qualifying draw ===
==== First qualifier ====
First round
1	(Netherlands) Lesley Pattinama Kerkhove	6	3	3
(Italy) Cristiana Ferrando	0	6	6
(Italy) Camilla Rosatello	6	3	2
11	(Belarus) Yuliya Hatouka	3	6	6

Qualifying competition
(Italy) Cristiana Ferrando	7^{7}	6
11	(Belarus) Yuliya Hatouka	6^{2}	1

==== Second qualifier ====
First round
2	(Slovakia) Viktória Kužmová	6	6
(Italy) Stefania Rubini	3	1
WC	(Slovenia) Noka Jurič	1	3
7	(Italy) Lucrezia Stefanini	6	6

Qualifying competition
2	(Slovakia) Viktória Kužmová	6	4	7^{7}
7	(Italy) Lucrezia Stefanini	4	6	6^{5}

==== Third qualifier ====
First round
3	(United States) Grace Min	5	0^{r}
(United States) Emina Bektas	7	0
(North Macedonia) Lina Gjorcheska	6	0	1
10	(Croatia) Tereza Mrdeža	3	6	6

Qualifying competition
(United States) Emina Bektas	6	4	0
10	(Croatia) Tereza Mrdeža	4	6	6

==== Fourth qualifier ====
First round
4	(Italy) Lucia Bronzetti	3	6	6
(Hungary) Fanny Stollár	6	3	2
PR	(United Kingdom) Samantha Murray Sharan	6	2
8	(Poland) Urszula Radwańska	4	0^{r}

Qualifying competition
4	(Italy) Lucia Bronzetti	6	6
PR	(United Kingdom) Samantha Murray Sharan	2	3

==== Fifth qualifier ====
First round
5	(Serbia) Aleksandra Krunić	6	6
WC	(Slovenia) Tina Cvetkovič	1	1
Alt	(Russia) Ekaterina Yashina	5	5
9	(Switzerland) Susan Bandecchi	7	7

Qualifying competition
5	(Serbia) Aleksandra Krunić	2	6	6
9	(Switzerland) Susan Bandecchi	6	1	3

==== Sixth qualifier ====
First round
6	(United Kingdom) Katie Boulter	6	6
WC	(Slovenia) Manca Pislak	3	2
WC	(Slovenia) Ela Nala Milić	1	0
12	(Romania) Irina Fetecău	6	6

Qualifying competition
6	(United Kingdom) Katie Boulter	7^{7}	6
12	(Romania) Irina Fetecău	6^{4}	2
