= 2009 Banka Koper Slovenia Open – Singles =

Singles
- 2009 Banka Koper Slovenia Open

Final
- Champion: (Russia) Dinara Safina
- Runner-up: (Italy) Sara Errani
- Score: 6–7^{(5–7)}, 6–1, 7–5

Details
- Draw: 32
- Seeds: 8

Events
Singles	Doubles
← 2008 ·	Banka Koper Slovenia Open	· 2010 →

Sara Errani was the defending champion, but she was defeated by World No. 1 Dinara Safina in the final, 6–7^{(5–7)}, 6–1, 7–5. This was the final WTA title Safina won before her retirement in 2014.

== Seeds ==
1. (Russia) Dinara Safina (champion)
2. (Spain) Anabel Medina Garrigues (first round)
3. (Estonia) Kaia Kanepi (first round)
4. (Italy) Roberta Vinci (second round)
5. (Italy) Sara Errani (final)
6. (Czech Republic) Lucie Šafářová (second round)
7. (Russia) Vera Dushevina (second round)
8. (Czech Republic) Petra Kvitová (second round)

== Draw ==
Key

- Q = Qualifier
- WC = Wild card
- LL = Lucky loser
- Alt = Alternate
- ITF = ITF entry
- PR = Protected ranking
- SR = Special ranking
- SE = Special exempt
- JE = Junior exempt
- JR = Junior Accelerator Programme entrant
- CO = College Accelerator Programme entrant
- NG = Next Gen Accelerator Program entrant
- w/o = Walkover
- r = Retired
- d = Defaulted

=== Finals ===
Semifinals
1	(Russia) Dinara Safina	6	6
(Italy) Alberta Brianti	4	3
(Switzerland) Stefanie Vögele	1	2
5	(Italy) Sara Errani	6	6

Final
1	(Russia) Dinara Safina	6^{5}	6	7
5	(Italy) Sara Errani	7	1	5

=== Top half ===
First round
1	(Russia) D Safina	6	6
WC	(Slovenia) T Majerič	0	4
(Germany) J Görges	4	6	2
Q	(Russia) K Pervak	6	4	6
Q	(Kazakhstan) S Karatantcheva	1	4
(Italy) ME Camerin	6	6
(Italy) T Garbin	0	3
7	(Russia) V Dushevina	6	6
3	(Estonia) K Kanepi	1	2
(Belarus) O Govortsova	6	6
(Italy) A Brianti	7	6
(Slovenia) P Hercog	5	4
(Russia) V Diatchenko	3	r
(France) C Pin	6
(Kazakhstan) G Voskoboeva	6	3	6^{4}
8	(Czech Republic) P Kvitová	4	6	7

Second round
1	(Russia) D Safina	6	6
Q	(Russia) K Pervak	1	2
(Italy) ME Camerin	4	7	6
7	(Russia) V Dushevina	6	5	0
(Belarus) O Govortsova	4	1
(Italy) A Brianti	6	6
(France) C Pin	6	6
8	(Czech Republic) P Kvitová	4	4

Quarterfinals
1	(Russia) D Safina	6	6
(Italy) ME Camerin	3	0
(Italy) A Brianti	6	6
(France) C Pin	3	2

Semifinals
1	(Russia) D Safina	6	6
(Italy) A Brianti	4	3

=== Bottom half ===
First round
6	(Czech Republic) L Šafářová	6	6
(United Kingdom) K O'Brien	4	4
(Switzerland) S Vögele	6	4	6
Q	(Georgia (country)) A Tatishvili	1	6	3
(Paraguay) R de los Ríos	5	6	7
(Ukraine) V Kutuzova	7	4	6^{6}
WC	(Slovenia) N Kolar	2	0
4	(Italy) R Vinci	6	6
5	(Italy) S Errani	6	6
(Netherlands) A Rus	1	0
(Czech Republic) K Zakopalová	6	6
(Slovenia) M Zec Peškirič	2	4
WC	(Croatia) P Martić	6	6
(Germany) K Barrois	3	4
Q	(Russia) V Manasieva	6	1	7
2	(Spain) A Medina Garrigues	3	6	5

Second round
6	(Czech Republic) L Šafářová	5	6	3
(Switzerland) S Vögele	7	2	6
(Paraguay) R de los Ríos	6	6
4	(Italy) R Vinci	3	4
5	(Italy) S Errani	6	6
(Czech Republic) K Zakopalová	1	1
WC	(Croatia) P Martić	6	6
Q	(Russia) V Manasieva	1	4

Quarterfinals
(Switzerland) S Vögele	6	6
(Paraguay) R de los Ríos	1	1
5	(Italy) S Errani	6	6
WC	(Croatia) P Martić	1	1

Semifinals
(Switzerland) S Vögele	1	2
5	(Italy) S Errani	6	6
