= 2009 Banka Koper Slovenia Open – Doubles =

Doubles
- 2009 Banka Koper Slovenia Open

Final
- Champions: (Germany) Julia Görges (Czech Republic) Vladimíra Uhlířová
- Runners-up: (France) Camille Pin (Czech Republic) Klára Zakopalová
- Score: 6–4, 6–2

Events
Singles	Doubles
← 2008 ·	Banka Koper Slovenia Open	· 2010 →

Anabel Medina Garrigues and Virginia Ruano Pascual were the defending champions, but both chose not to participate that year.

Julia Görges and Vladimíra Uhlířová won in the final, 6–4, 6–2, against Camille Pin and Klára Zakopalová.

== Seeds ==
1. (Russia) Vera Dushevina / (Kazakhstan) Galina Voskoboeva (quarterfinals)
2. (Czech Republic) Eva Hrdinová / (Czech Republic) Renata Voráčová (first round)
3. (Germany) Julia Görges / (Czech Republic) Vladimíra Uhlířová (champions)
4. (Germany) Kristina Barrois / (Italy) Tathiana Garbin (first round)

== Draw ==
=== Key ===
- Q = Qualifier
- WC = Wild card
- LL = Lucky loser
- Alt = Alternate
- SE = Special exempt
- PR = Protected ranking
- ITF = ITF entry
- JE = Junior exempt
- w/o = Walkover
- r = Retired
- d = Defaulted
- SR = Special ranking

=== Draw ===
First round
1	(Russia) V Dushevina (Kazakhstan) G Voskoboeva	6	6
(Slovakia) K Kučová (United Kingdom) G Stoop	4	2
ALT	(Belarus) O Govortsova (Kazakhstan) S Karatantcheva	6
WC	(Slovenia) N Kolar (Slovenia) T Majerič	2	r
4	(Germany) K Barrois (Italy) T Garbin	4	6	[7]
(France) C Pin (Czech Republic) K Zakopalová	6	1	[10]
(Czech Republic) N Fraňková (Kyrgyzstan) K Palkina	6	4	[9]
(Italy) S Errani (Slovenia) M Zec Peškirič	4	6	[11]
(Russia) A Rodionova (Switzerland) S Vögele	0	5
(Russia) E Ivanova (Georgia (country)) A Tatishvili	6	7
(Russia) E Bovina (Estonia) K Kanepi	4	7	[3]
3	(Germany) J Görges (Czech Republic) V Uhlířová	6	6^{4}	[10]
(Slovenia) P Hercog (Croatia) P Martić	7	1	[10]
(Italy) A Brianti (Italy) ME Camerin	6^{6}	6	[6]
(Greece) E Daniilidou (Germany) J Wöhr	6	6
2	(Czech Republic) E Hrdinová (Czech Republic) R Voráčová	3	3

Quarterfinals
1	(Russia) V Dushevina (Kazakhstan) G Voskoboeva	7	4	[6]
ALT	(Belarus) O Govortsova (Kazakhstan) S Karatantcheva	5	6	10
(France) C Pin (Czech Republic) K Zakopalová	6	6
(Italy) S Errani (Slovenia) M Zec Peškirič	1	4
(Russia) E Ivanova (Georgia (country)) A Tatishvili	4	3
3	(Germany) J Görges (Czech Republic) V Uhlířová	6	6
(Slovenia) P Hercog (Croatia) P Martić	7	3	[1]
(Greece) E Daniilidou (Germany) J Wöhr	6^{2}	6	[10]

Semifinals
ALT	(Belarus) O Govortsova (Kazakhstan) S Karatantcheva	1	3
(France) C Pin (Czech Republic) K Zakopalová	6	6
3	(Germany) J Görges (Czech Republic) V Uhlířová	4	6	[10]
(Greece) E Daniilidou (Germany) J Wöhr	6	4	3

Final
(France) C Pin (Czech Republic) K Zakopalová	4	2
3	(Germany) J Görges (Czech Republic) V Uhlířová	6	6
