= 2008 Banka Koper Slovenia Open – Singles =

Singles
- 2008 Banka Koper Slovenia Open

Final
- Champion: (Italy) Sara Errani
- Runner-up: (Spain) Anabel Medina Garrigues
- Score: 6–3, 6–3

Events
Singles	Doubles
← 2007 ·	Banka Koper Slovenia Open	· 2009 →

Tatiana Golovin was the defending champion, but chose not to participate that year.

Sara Errani won in the final 6–3, 6–3, against Anabel Medina Garrigues.

== Seeds ==
1. (Russia) Maria Kirilenko (quarterfinals)
2. (Slovenia) Katarina Srebotnik (second round)
3. (Denmark) Caroline Wozniacki (semifinals)
4. (Spain) Anabel Medina Garrigues (final)
5. (Bulgaria) Tsvetana Pironkova (first round)
6. (New Zealand) Marina Erakovic (first round)
7. (Spain) Carla Suárez Navarro (first round)
8. (Italy) Sara Errani (champion)

== Draw ==
=== Key ===
- Q = Qualifier
- WC = Wild card
- LL = Lucky loser
- Alt = Alternate
- SE = Special exempt
- PR = Protected ranking
- ITF = ITF entry
- JE = Junior exempt
- w/o = Walkover
- r = Retired
- d = Defaulted
- SR = Special ranking

=== Finals ===
Semifinals
8	(Italy) Sara Errani	6	6
3	(Denmark) Caroline Wozniacki	4	4
4	(Spain) Anabel Medina Garrigues	6	2	6
(Germany) Julia Görges	3	6	4

Final
8	(Italy) Sara Errani	6	6
4	(Spain) Anabel Medina Garrigues	3	3

=== Top half ===
First round
1	(Russia) M Kirilenko	6	6
Q	(Croatia) N Ožegović	1	1
Q	(Italy) A Brianti	1	3
(Italy) R Vinci	6	6
(Italy) M Santangelo	4	7	6
(Belgium) Y Wickmayer	6	6^{2}	4
Q	(Italy) ME Camerin	7	2	1
8	(Italy) S Errani	6^{4}	6	6
3	(Denmark) C Wozniacki	7	6
WC	(Slovenia) A Klepač	5	0
(Russia) E Rodina	6	3	3
WC	(Croatia) K Šprem	4	6	6
(Russia) V Dushevina	6	6
(Spain) V Ruano Pascual	3	3
(United Kingdom) K O'Brien	7	4	6
5	(Bulgaria) T Pironkova	6^{6}	6	2

Second round
1	(Russia) M Kirilenko	6	6
(Italy) R Vinci	1	2
(Italy) M Santangelo	2	4
8	(Italy) S Errani	6	6
3	(Denmark) C Wozniacki	6	6
WC	(Croatia) K Šprem	1	1
(Russia) V Dushevina	6	6
(United Kingdom) K O'Brien	3	2

Quarterfinals
1	(Russia) M Kirilenko	1	5
8	(Italy) S Errani	6	7
3	(Denmark) C Wozniacki	6	6
(Russia) V Dushevina	0	1

Semifinals
8	(Italy) S Errani	6	6
3	(Denmark) C Wozniacki	4	4

=== Bottom half ===
First round
6	(New Zealand) M Erakovic	5	7	3
(France) C Pin	7	5	6
(Ukraine) T Perebiynis	3	4
Q	(Russia) E Bovina	6	6
(Ukraine) J Vakulenko	5	6	6
WC	(Slovenia) P Hercog	7	4	4
(Russia) E Makarova	1	3
4	(Spain) A Medina Garrigues	6	6
7	(Spain) C Suárez Navarro	4	4
(Czech Republic) K Zakopalová	6	6
(Croatia) P Martić	7	6
(Germany) A Kerber	5	2
(Russia) E Bychkova	4	3
(Germany) J Görges	6	6
PR	(Croatia) S Mamić	2	2
2	(Slovenia) K Srebotnik	6	6

Second round
(France) C Pin	3	7	6^{6}
Q	(Russia) E Bovina	6	5	7
(Ukraine) J Vakulenko	4	4
4	(Spain) A Medina Garrigues	6	6
(Czech Republic) K Zakopalová	3	6	6^{3}
(Croatia) P Martić	6	4	7
(Germany) J Görges	6	6
2	(Slovenia) K Srebotnik	4	2

Quarterfinals
Q	(Russia) E Bovina	3	2
4	(Spain) A Medina Garrigues	6	6
(Croatia) P Martić	3	6	4
(Germany) J Görges	6	4	6

Semifinals
4	(Spain) A Medina Garrigues	6	2	6
(Germany) J Görges	3	6	4
