= 2021 Zavarovalnica Sava Portorož =

- Date: 13–19 September
- Edition: 7th
- Category: WTA 250
- Draw: 32S / 24Q / 16D
- Prize money: $235,238
- Surface: Hard
- Location: Portorož, Slovenia

Champions

Singles
- (Italy) Jasmine Paolini

Doubles
- (Russia) Anna Kalinskaya / (Slovakia) Tereza Mihalíková
← 2010 ·	Slovenia Open	· 2022 →

The 2021 WTA Slovenia Open (also known as the Zavarovalnica Sava Portorož for sponsorship purposes) was a WTA 250 tournament played on outdoor hard courts. It was the 7th edition of the Slovenia Open, last held in 2010. It was primarily organised due to the cancellation of the Asian tournaments during the 2021 season because of the ongoing COVID-19 pandemic. The 2021 event took place at the Tennis Club Portorož in Portorož, Slovenia from 13 to 19 September 2021.

== Champions ==
=== Singles ===
- (Italy) Jasmine Paolini def. (United States) Alison Riske, 7–6^{(7–4)}, 6–2

This was Paolini's maiden WTA Tour singles title.

=== Doubles ===
- (Russia) Anna Kalinskaya / (Slovakia) Tereza Mihalíková def. (Serbia) Aleksandra Krunić / (Netherlands) Lesley Pattinama Kerkhove, 4–6, 6–2, [12–10]

== Singles main-draw entrants ==
=== Seeds ===
Country	Player	Rank^{1}	Seed
CRO	Petra Martić	32	1
KAZ	Yulia Putintseva	33	2
USA	Alison Riske	35	3
ROU	Sorana Cîrstea	39	4
SLO	Tamara Zidanšek	40	5
UKR	Dayana Yastremska	51	6
SWE	Rebecca Peterson	54	7
CRO	Donna Vekić	57	8

- Rankings are as of August 30, 2021.

=== Other entrants ===
The following players received wildcards into the singles main draw:

- (Slovenia) Živa Falkner
- (Slovenia) Pia Lovrič
- (Slovenia) Nika Radišić

The following players received entry from the qualifying draw:

- (United Kingdom) Katie Boulter
- (Italy) Lucia Bronzetti
- (Italy) Cristiana Ferrando
- (Serbia) Aleksandra Krunić
- (Slovakia) Viktória Kužmová
- (Croatia) Tereza Mrdeža

=== Withdrawals ===
Before the tournament

- (Spain) Paula Badosa → replaced by (Italy) Sara Errani
- (Russia) Anna Blinkova → replaced by (Romania) Jaqueline Cristian
- (France) Caroline Garcia → replaced by (Slovakia) Kristína Kučová
- (Slovenia) Polona Hercog → replaced by (Slovenia) Kaja Juvan
- (Russia) Daria Kasatkina → replaced by (Croatia) Ana Konjuh
- (Romania) Elena-Gabriela Ruse → replaced by (Russia) Anna Kalinskaya
- (Spain) Sara Sorribes Tormo → replaced by (Italy) Jasmine Paolini

== Doubles main-draw entrants ==
=== Seeds ===
Country	Player	Country	Player	Rank^{1}	Seed
SLO	Andreja Klepač	SLO	Tamara Zidanšek	101	1
SRB	Aleksandra Krunić	NED	Lesley Pattinama Kerkhove	144	2
KAZ	Anna Danilina	HUN	Fanny Stollár	198	3
POL	Katarzyna Piter	GBR	Heather Watson	231	4

- ^{1} Rankings are as of 30 August 2021.

=== Other entrants ===
The following pairs received wildcards into the doubles main draw:

- (Slovenia) Tina Cvetkovič / (Slovenia) Ela Nala Milić
- (Slovenia) Živa Falkner / (Slovenia) Pia Lovrič

=== Withdrawals ===
Before the tournament

- (Romania) Mihaela Buzărnescu / (Poland) Katarzyna Piter → replaced by (Poland) Katarzyna Piter / (United Kingdom) Heather Watson
- (United Kingdom) Harriet Dart / (Czech Republic) Renata Voráčová → replaced by (Montenegro) Danka Kovinić / (Czech Republic) Renata Voráčová
- (Poland) Katarzyna Kawa / (Slovakia) Tereza Mihalíková → replaced by (Russia) Anna Kalinskaya / (Slovakia) Tereza Mihalíková
- (Romania) Monica Niculescu / (Romania) Elena-Gabriela Ruse → replaced by (India) Rutuja Bhosale / (United Kingdom) Emily Webley-Smith
