= 2008 Banka Koper Slovenia Open – Doubles =

Doubles
- 2008 Banka Koper Slovenia Open

Final
- Champions: (Spain) Anabel Medina Garrigues (Spain) Virginia Ruano Pascual
- Runners-up: (Russia) Vera Dushevina (Russia) Ekaterina Makarova
- Score: 6–4, 6–1

Events
Singles	Doubles
← 2007 ·	Banka Koper Slovenia Open	· 2009 →

Lucie Hradecká and Renata Voráčová were the defending champions, but Voráčová chose not to participate, and only Hradecká competed that year. Hradecká partnered up with Andreja Klepač, but they lost in the quarterfinals to Vera Dushevina and Ekaterina Makarova.

Anabel Medina Garrigues and Virginia Ruano Pascual won the tournament, defeating Dushevina and Makarova in the final, 6–4, 6–1.

== Seeds ==
1. (Spain) Anabel Medina Garrigues / (Spain) Virginia Ruano Pascual (champions)
2. (Poland) Klaudia Jans / (Poland) Alicja Rosolska (first round)
3. (Italy) Sara Errani / (Italy) Mara Santangelo (first round)
4. (Spain) María José Martínez Sánchez / (Spain) Arantxa Parra Santonja (semifinals)

== Draw ==
=== Key ===
- Q = Qualifier
- WC = Wild card
- LL = Lucky loser
- Alt = Alternate
- SE = Special exempt
- PR = Protected ranking
- ITF = ITF entry
- JE = Junior exempt
- w/o = Walkover
- r = Retired
- d = Defaulted
- SR = Special ranking

First round
1	(Spain) A Medina Garrigues (Spain) V Ruano Pascual	6	6
(Ukraine) T Perebiynis (Russia) E Rodina	0	1
(France) C Pin (Belgium) Y Wickmayer	6	6
(Hungary) K Marosi (Brazil) M Tavares	4	3
4	(Spain) MJ Martínez Sánchez (Spain) A Parra Santonja	6	6
(Italy) A Besser (Slovenia) M Kambič	2	2
(United Kingdom) A Elliott (China) X Han	5	6	[10]
WC	(Slovenia) T Obrez (Slovenia) A Prislan	7	2	[1]
(Bulgaria) B Pawlowa-Dimitrova (Austria) N Rottmann	0	3
(Czech Republic) L Hradecká (Slovenia) A Klepač	6	6
(Russia) V Dushevina (Russia) E Makarova	6	6
3	(Italy) S Errani (Italy) M Santangelo	1	3
(Russia) E Bychkova (Russia) V Manasieva	6	6
(New Zealand) M Erakovic (Slovenia) P Hercog	4	4
(United Kingdom) S Borwell (United States) C Nagle	6	3	[10]
2	(Poland) K Jans (Poland) A Rosolska	1	6	[7]

Quarterfinals
1	(Spain) A Medina Garrigues (Spain) V Ruano Pascual	6	6
(France) C Pin (Belgium) Y Wickmayer	1	1
4	(Spain) MJ Martínez Sánchez (Spain) A Parra Santonja	6	6
(United Kingdom) A Elliott (China) X Han	2	1
(Czech Republic) L Hradecká (Slovenia) A Klepač	2	6^{5}
(Russia) V Dushevina (Russia) E Makarova	6	7^{7}
(Russia) E Bychkova (Russia) V Manasieva	6	6
(United Kingdom) S Borwell (United States) C Nagle	4	2

Semifinals
1	(Spain) A Medina Garrigues (Spain) V Ruano Pascual	7^{7}	6
4	(Spain) MJ Martínez Sánchez (Spain) A Parra Santonja	6^{3}	3
(Russia) V Dushevina (Russia) E Makarova	6	6
(Russia) E Bychkova (Russia) V Manasieva	3	3

Final
1	(Spain) A Medina Garrigues (Spain) V Ruano Pascual	6	6
(Russia) V Dushevina (Russia) E Makarova	4	1
