= 2009 Banka Koper Slovenia Open =

- Date: 20–26 July
- Edition: 5th
- Category: WTA International
- Draw: 32S / 16D
- Prize money: $220,000
- Surface: Hard / outdoor
- Location: Portorož, Slovenia

Champions

Singles
- (Russia) Dinara Safina

Doubles
- (Germany) Julia Görges / (Czech Republic) Vladimíra Uhlířová
← 2008 ·	Banka Koper Slovenia Open	· 2010 →

The 2009 Banka Koper Slovenia Open was a women's tennis tournament played on outdoor hard courts. It was the fifth edition of the Banka Koper Slovenia Open, and was part of the WTA International tournaments of the 2009 WTA Tour. It took place in Portorož, Slovenia, from 20 July through 26 July 2009. First-seeded Dinara Safina won the singles title.

== Finals ==
=== Singles ===
(Russia) Dinara Safina defeated (Italy) Sara Errani, 6–7^{(5–7)}, 6–1, 7–5

- It was Safina's third title of the year and 12th of her career.

=== Doubles ===
(Germany) Julia Görges / (Czech Republic) Vladimíra Uhlířová defeated (France) Camille Pin / (Czech Republic) Klára Zakopalová, 6–4, 6–2

== WTA entrants ==
=== Seeds ===
Player	Nationality	Ranking*	Seeding
Dinara Safina	Russia	1	1
Anabel Medina Garrigues	(Spain)	21	2
Kaia Kanepi	Estonia	24	3
Roberta Vinci	Italy	46	4
Sara Errani	Italy	47	5
Lucie Šafářová	Czech Republic	49	6
Vera Dushevina	Russia	50	7
Petra Kvitová	Czech Republic	63	8

- Seedings are based on the rankings of July 13, 2009.

=== Other entrants ===
The following players received wildcards into the singles main draw

- (Slovenia) Tadeja Majerič
- (Slovenia) Nastja Kolar
- (Croatia) Petra Martić

The following players received entry from the qualifying draw:

- (Georgia (country)) Anna Tatishvili
- (Kazakhstan) Sesil Karatantcheva
- (Russia) Vesna Manasieva
- (Russia) Ksenia Pervak
