= 2006 Banka Koper Slovenia Open – Doubles =

Doubles
- 2006 Banka Koper Slovenia Open

Final
- Champion: (Czech Republic) Lucie Hradecká (Czech Republic) Renata Voráčová
- Runner-up: (Czech Republic) Eva Birnerová (France) Émilie Loit
- Score: Walkover

Events
Singles	Doubles
← 2005 ·	Banka Koper Slovenia Open	· 2007 →

The doubles Tournament at the 2006 Banka Koper Slovenia Open took place between September 18 and September 24 on outdoor hard courts in Portorož, Slovenia.

Lucie Hradecká and Renata Voráčová won the title, after their opponents Eva Birnerová and Émilie Loit withdrew before the final (due to Loit's left wrist sprain).

== Seeds ==
1. (Italy) Maria Elena Camerin / (Switzerland) Emmanuelle Gagliardi (semifinals)
2. (Czech Republic) Eva Birnerová / (France) Émilie Loit (final)
3. (Slovakia) Jarmila Gajdošová / (Australia) Bryanne Stewart (semifinals)
4. (Czech Republic) Lucie Hradecká / (Czech Republic) Renata Voráčová (winners)

== Results ==
=== Key ===
- Q = Qualifier
- WC = Wild card
- LL = Lucky loser
- Alt = Alternate
- SE = Special exempt
- PR = Protected ranking
- ITF = ITF entry
- JE = Junior exempt
- w/o = Walkover
- r = Retired
- d = Defaulted
- SR = Special ranking

=== Draw ===
First round
1	(Italy) ME Camerin (Switzerland) E Gagliardi	6	6
(Czech Republic) K Böhmová (Slovenia) A Klepač	4	4
WC	(Slovenia) T Krizan (Slovenia) M Matevžič	4	6^{4}
Q	(Czech Republic) A Hlaváčková (Slovakia) Ľ Kurhajcová	6	7
4	(Czech Republic) L Hradecká (Czech Republic) R Voráčová	5	6	6
(Poland) K Jans (Poland) A Rosolska	7	0	3
(Germany) A Bachmann (Germany) J Schruff	4	6	6
(Estonia) M Ani (Italy) S Errani	6	4	3
(Russia) E Bychkova (Czech Republic) G Chmelinová	5	3
(Poland) K Kosińska (France) C Pin	7	6
(Germany) K Barrois (Germany) J Wöhr	4	2
3	(Slovakia) J Gajdošová (Australia) B Stewart	6	6
(Canada) M Drake (Germany) M Müller	4	6	6
(Italy) R Oprandi (Czech Republic) V Uhlířová	6	2	1
(Italy) T Garbin (Italy) K Knapp	1	3
2	(Czech Republic) E Birnerová (France) É Loit	6	6

Quarterfinals
1	(Italy) ME Camerin (Switzerland) E Gagliardi	6	6^{6}	6
Q	(Czech Republic) A Hlaváčková (Slovakia) Ľ Kurhajcová	0	7	0
4	(Czech Republic) L Hradecká (Czech Republic) R Voráčová	6	6
(Germany) A Bachmann (Germany) J Schruff	4	1
(Poland) K Kosińska (France) C Pin	7	2	0
3	(Slovakia) J Gajdošová (Australia) B Stewart	6^{5}	6	6
(Canada) M Drake (Germany) M Müller	1	4
2	(Czech Republic) E Birnerová (France) É Loit	6	6

Semifinals
1	(Italy) ME Camerin (Switzerland) E Gagliardi	2	r
4	(Czech Republic) L Hradecká (Czech Republic) R Voráčová	3
3	(Slovakia) J Gajdošová (Australia) B Stewart	3	6^{6}
2	(Czech Republic) E Birnerová (France) É Loit	6	7

Final
4	(Czech Republic) L Hradecká (Czech Republic) R Voráčová	w/o
2	(Czech Republic) E Birnerová (France) É Loit
