= 2006 Banka Koper Slovenia Open =

- Date: 18–24 September
- Edition: 2nd
- Category: WTA Tier IV
- Surface: Hard / outdoor
- Location: Portorož, Slovenia

Champions

Singles
- (Austria) Tamira Paszek

Doubles
- (Czech Republic) Lucie Hradecká / (Czech Republic) Renata Voráčová
← 2005 ·	Banka Koper Slovenia Open	· 2007 →

The 2006 Banka Koper Slovenia Open was a women's tennis tournament played on outdoor hard courts. It was the 2nd edition of the Slovenia Open, and was part of the WTA Tier IV tournaments of the 2006 women's professional tennis season. It was held in Portorož, Slovenia, from 18 September until 24 September 2006. Unseeded Tamira Paszek, who entered the competition as a qualifier, won the singles title.

== Finals ==
=== Singles ===
(Austria) Tamira Paszek defeated (Italy) Maria Elena Camerin, 7–5, 6–1

- Paszek won the first title of her career. She became the youngest tour singles titlist in 2006, and the seventh-youngest of all-time.

=== Doubles ===
(Czech Republic) Lucie Hradecká / (Czech Republic) Renata Voráčová claimed the title, when (Czech Republic) Eva Birnerová / (France) Émilie Loit withdrew before the final.

== Points and prize money ==
=== Point distribution ===
Event	W	F	SF	QF	Round of 16	Round of 32	Q	Q3	Q2	Q1
Singles	115	80	50	30	15	1	7	3	2	1
Doubles	115	80	50	30	1	—	—	—	—	—

=== Prize money ===
Event	W	F	SF	QF	Round of 16	Round of 32	Q3	Q2	Q1
Singles	$21,140	$11,395	$6,140	$3,310	$1,775	$955	$515	$280	$165
Doubles *	$6,240	$3,360	$1,810	$970	$550	—	—	—	—

_{* per team}
