= 2005 Banka Koper Slovenia Open =

- Date: 19–25 September
- Edition: 1st
- Category: WTA Tier IV
- Surface: Hard / outdoor
- Location: Portorož, Slovenia

Champions

Singles
- (Czech Republic) Klára Koukalová

Doubles
- (Spain) Anabel Medina Garrigues / (Italy) Roberta Vinci
Banka Koper Slovenia Open	· 2006 →

The 2005 Banka Koper Slovenia Open was a women's tennis tournament played on outdoor hard courts. It was the inaugural edition of the Slovenia Open, and was part of the WTA Tier IV tournaments of the 2005 women's professional tennis season. It was held in Portorož, Slovenia, in mid-September, 2006.

== Points and prize money ==
=== Point distribution ===
Event	W	F	SF	QF	Round of 16	Round of 32	Q	Q3	Q2	Q1
Singles	115	80	50	30	15	1	7	3	2	1
Doubles	115	80	50	30	1	—	—	—	—	—

=== Prize money ===
Event	W	F	SF	QF	Round of 16	Round of 32	Q3	Q2	Q1
Singles	$21,140	$11,395	$6,140	$3,310	$1,775	$955	$515	$280	$165
Doubles *	$6,240	$3,360	$1,810	$970	$550	—	—	—	—

_{* per team}

== Finals ==
=== Singles ===
(Czech Republic) Klára Koukalová defeated (Slovenia) Katarina Srebotnik, 6–2, 4–6, 6–3

=== Doubles ===
(Spain) Anabel Medina Garrigues / (Italy) Roberta Vinci claimed the title, when (Croatia) Jelena Kostanić / (Slovenia) Katarina Srebotnik, 6–4, 5–7, 6–2
