= 2006 Banka Koper Slovenia Open – Singles =

Singles
- 2006 Banka Koper Slovenia Open

Final
- Champion: (Austria) Tamira Paszek
- Runner-up: (Italy) Maria Elena Camerin
- Score: 7–5, 6–1

Events
Singles	Doubles
← 2005 ·	Banka Koper Slovenia Open	· 2007 →

The singles Tournament at the 2006 Banka Koper Slovenia Open took place between September 18 and September 24 on outdoor hard courts in Portorož, Slovenia.

Tamira Paszek emerged as the winner.

== Seeds ==
1. (Slovenia) Katarina Srebotnik (first round)
2. (Italy) Mara Santangelo (withdrew due to a back injury)
3. (Austria) Sybille Bammer (first round)
4. (Germany) Martina Müller (quarterfinals)
5. (Italy) Romina Oprandi (second round)
6. (Italy) Maria Elena Camerin (final)
7. (France) Émilie Loit (semifinals, retired due to a left wrist sprain)
8. (Italy) Tathiana Garbin (semifinals)
9. (Slovakia) Jarmila Gajdošová (quarterfinals)

== Draw ==
=== Key ===
- Q = Qualifier
- WC = Wild card
- LL = Lucky loser
- Alt = Alternate
- SE = Special exempt
- PR = Protected ranking
- ITF = ITF entry
- JE = Junior exempt
- w/o = Walkover
- r = Retired
- d = Defaulted
- SR = Special ranking

=== Finals ===
Semifinals
6	(Italy) Maria Elena Camerin	7	6
8	(Italy) Tathiana Garbin	5	2
Q	(Austria) Tamira Paszek	4	2
7	(France) Émilie Loit	6	0^{r}

Final
6	(Italy) Maria Elena Camerin	5	1
Q	(Austria) Tamira Paszek	7	6

=== Top half ===
First round
1	(Slovenia) K Srebotnik	6	4	4
(Slovakia) M Suchá	4	6	6
(France) C Pin	4	6^{3}
(Estonia) M Ani	6	7
WC	(Croatia) S Ančić	1	1
(Bulgaria) T Pironkova	6	6
(Croatia) I Lisjak	1	6^{0}
6	(Italy) ME Camerin	6	7
4	(Germany) M Müller	6^{6}	6	7
Q	(Italy) K Knapp	7	3	6^{6}
(Germany) K Barrois	6	4	4
LL	(Czech Republic) R Voráčová	3	6	6
(Czech Republic) K Böhmová	5	3
(Switzerland) E Gagliardi	7	6
(Czech Republic) K Zakopalová	3	5
8	(Italy) T Garbin	6	7

Second round
(Slovakia) M Suchá	6	6
(Estonia) M Ani	3	4
(Bulgaria) T Pironkova	3	3
6	(Italy) ME Camerin	6	6
4	(Germany) M Müller	6	3	6
LL	(Czech Republic) R Voráčová	4	6	3
(Switzerland) E Gagliardi	3	6	2
8	(Italy) T Garbin	6	2	6

Quarterfinals
(Slovakia) M Suchá	5	7	1
6	(Italy) ME Camerin	7	5	6
4	(Germany) M Müller	2	5
8	(Italy) T Garbin	6	7

Semifinals
6	(Italy) ME Camerin	7	6
8	(Italy) T Garbin	5	2

=== Bottom half ===
First round
5	(Italy) R Oprandi	6	7
(Germany) J Schruff	3	5
Q	(Slovenia) T Majerič	4	5
WC	(Slovenia) A Klepač	6	7
Q	(Poland) K Kosińska	4	6	1
Q	(Austria) T Paszek	6	2	6
(Czech Republic) I Benešová	6	3	6
3	(Austria) S Bammer	4	6	3
7	(France) É Loit	6	4	6
WC	(Slovenia) M Zec Peškirič	1	6	4
(Czech Republic) Z Ondrášková	7	6
(Russia) E Bychkova	6^{6}	6^{r}
LL	(Czech Republic) L Hradecká	3	4
(Georgia (country)) M Chakhnashvili	6	6
(Czech Republic) E Birnerová	3	1
9	(Slovakia) J Gajdošová	6	6

Second round
5	(Italy) R Oprandi	5	6	1
WC	(Slovenia) A Klepač	7	4	6
Q	(Austria) T Paszek	6	6
(Czech Republic) I Benešová	1	2
7	(France) É Loit	3	6	6
(Czech Republic) Z Ondrášková	6	3	3
(Georgia (country)) M Chakhnashvili	2	4
9	(Slovakia) J Gajdošová	6	6

Quarterfinals
WC	(Slovenia) A Klepač	4	2
Q	(Austria) T Paszek	6	6
7	(France) É Loit	6	6
9	(Slovakia) J Gajdošová	3	3

Semifinals
Q	(Austria) T Paszek	4	2
7	(France) É Loit	6	0^{r}
