= 2008 Banka Koper Slovenia Open =

- Date: 21–27 July
- Edition: 4th
- Category: Tier IV Series
- Draw: 32S / 16D
- Prize money: $145,000
- Surface: Hard / outdoor
- Location: Portorož, Slovenia

Champions

Singles
- (Italy) Sara Errani

Doubles
- (Spain) Anabel Medina Garrigues / (Spain) Virginia Ruano Pascual
← 2007 ·	Banka Koper Slovenia Open	· 2009 →

The 2008 Banka Koper Slovenia Open was a women's tennis tournament played on outdoor hard courts. It was the 4th edition of the Banka Koper Slovenia Open, and was part of the Tier IV Series of the 2008 WTA Tour. It took place in Portorož, Slovenia, from 21 July until 27 July 2008. Eighth-seeded Sara Errani won the singles title and earned $22,900 first-prize money.

== Finals ==
=== Singles ===
(Italy) Sara Errani defeated (Spain) Anabel Medina Garrigues 6–3, 6–3

- It was Errani's 2nd title of the year, and overall.

=== Doubles ===
(Spain) Anabel Medina Garrigues / (Spain) Virginia Ruano Pascual defeated (Russia) Vera Dushevina / (Russia) Ekaterina Makarova 6–4, 6–1
