= 2007 Banka Koper Slovenia Open – Doubles =

Doubles
- 2007 Banka Koper Slovenia Open

Final
- Champions: (Czech Republic) Lucie Hradecká (Czech Republic) Renata Voráčová
- Runners-up: (Slovenia) Andreja Klepač (Russia) Elena Likhovtseva
- Score: 5–7, 6–4, 10–7

Events
| Singles | Doubles |
| ← 2006 · | Banka Koper Slovenia Open | · 2008 → |

The women's doubles Tournament at the 2007 Banka Koper Slovenia Open took place between October 29 and November 4 on outdoor hard courts in Portorož, Slovenia. Lucie Hradecká and Renata Voráčová won the title, defeating Andreja Klepač and Elena Likhovtseva in the final.

== Seeds ==
1. (France) Émilie Loit / (United States) Meilen Tu (semifinals)
2. (Italy) Maria Elena Camerin / (Argentina) Gisela Dulko (first round)
3. (Czech Republic) Lucie Hradecká / (Czech Republic) Renata Voráčová (champions)
4. (Poland) Klaudia Jans / (Poland) Alicja Rosolska (first round)

== Draw ==
=== Key ===
- Q = Qualifier
- WC = Wild card
- LL = Lucky loser
- Alt = Alternate
- SE = Special exempt
- PR = Protected ranking
- ITF = ITF entry
- JE = Junior exempt
- w/o = Walkover
- r = Retired
- d = Defaulted
- SR = Special ranking

First round
1 | (France) E Loit (United States) M Tu | 6 | 6
(Germany) A Kerber (United States) L Osterloh | 2 | 2
WC | (Slovenia) J Kajtazovič (Slovenia) T Obrez | 2 | 4
(Russia) E Dranets (Croatia) I Lisjak | 6 | 6
3 | (Czech Republic) L Hradecká (Czech Republic) R Voráčová | 6 | 6
(Georgia (country)) M Chakhnashvili (Poland) K Kosińska | 1 | 1
(Germany) M Ehmer (Germany) K Perkovic | 6^{2} | 6 | [10]
(Romania) A Dulgheru (Serbia) A Jovanović | 7 | 2 | [8]
(Slovakia) K Kachlíková (United Kingdom) K O'Brien | 6 | 7
(Germany) A Matic (Slovenia) A Prislan | 2 | 5
(France) S Foretz (Switzerland) E Gagliardi | 6 | 1 | [10]
4 | (Poland) K Jans (Poland) A Rosolska | 2 | 6 | [4]
(Austria) S Bammer (Slovenia) P Hercog | 6 | 6
(Slovenia) T Mohorcic (Slovenia) P Pajalič | 0 | 1
(Slovenia) A Klepač (Russia) E Likhovtseva | 6 | 6^{4} | [10]
2 | (Italy) ME Camerin (Argentina) G Dulko | 3 | 7 | [5]

Quarterfinals
1 | (France) E Loit (United States) M Tu | w/o
(Russia) E Dranets (Croatia) I Lisjak
3 | (Czech Republic) L Hradecká (Czech Republic) R Voráčová | 6 | 6
(Germany) M Ehmer (Germany) K Perkovic | 0 | 2
(Slovakia) K Kachlíková (United Kingdom) K O'Brien | 4 | 3
(France) S Foretz (Switzerland) E Gagliardi | 6 | 6
(Austria) S Bammer (Slovenia) P Hercog | 4 | 1
(Slovenia) A Klepač (Russia) E Likhovtseva | 6 | 6

Semifinals
1 | (France) E Loit (United States) M Tu | 3 | 6 | [7]
3 | (Czech Republic) L Hradecká (Czech Republic) R Voráčová | 6 | 4 | [10]
(France) S Foretz (Switzerland) E Gagliardi | 4 | 1
(Slovenia) A Klepač (Russia) E Likhovtseva | 6 | 6

Final
3 | (Czech Republic) L Hradecká (Czech Republic) R Voráčová | 5 | 6 | [10]
(Slovenia) A Klepač (Russia) E Likhovtseva | 7 | 4 | [7]
