= 2005 Banka Koper Slovenia Open – Singles =

Singles
- 2005 Banka Koper Slovenia Open

Final
- Champion: (Czech Republic) Klára Koukalová
- Runner-up: (Slovenia) Katarina Srebotnik
- Score: 6–2, 4–6, 6–3

Events
Singles	Doubles
Banka Koper Slovenia Open	· 2006 →

The singles Tournament at the 2005 Banka Koper Slovenia Open took place in mid-September on outdoor hard courts in Portorož, Slovenia.

Klára Koukalová won the title, defeating Katarina Srebotnik 6–2, 4–6, 6–3 in the final.

== Seeds ==
1. (Italy) Silvia Farina Elia (first round)
2. (Spain) Anabel Medina Garrigues (quarterfinals)
3. (Czech Republic) Květa Peschke (second round)
4. (Czech Republic) Klára Koukalová (Winner)
5. (France) Marion Bartoli (first round)
6. (Slovenia) Katarina Srebotnik (final)
7. (Czech Republic) Iveta Benešová (second round)
8. (Italy) Roberta Vinci (quarterfinals)

== Draw ==
=== Key ===
- Q = Qualifier
- WC = Wild card
- LL = Lucky loser
- Alt = Alternate
- ITF = ITF entry
- PR = Protected ranking
- SR = Special ranking
- SE = Special exempt
- JE = Junior exempt
- JR = Junior Accelerator Programme entrant
- CO = College Accelerator Programme entrant
- NG = Next Gen Accelerator Program entrant
- w/o = Walkover
- r = Retired
- d = Defaulted

=== Finals ===
Semifinals
(Germany) Vanessa Henke	3	6	1
4	(Czech Republic) Klára Koukalová	6	3	6
(Greece) Eleni Daniilidou	2	2
6	(Slovenia) Katarina Srebotnik	6	6

Final
4	(Czech Republic) Klára Koukalová	6	4	6
6	(Slovenia) Katarina Srebotnik	2	6	3

=== Top half ===
First round
1	(Italy) S Farina Elia	1	7	4
(Germany) V Henke	6	6^{3}	6
(Russia) E Bychkova	7	6
LL	(Luxembourg) C Schaul	5	3
(Tunisia) S Sfar	6^{2}	4
(United States) M Tu	7	6
Q	(Croatia) A Vrljić	2	5
7	(Czech Republic) I Benešová	6	7
4	(Czech Republic) K Koukalová	7	6
(Spain) M Sánchez Lorenzo	6^{2}	0
(Germany) S Klösel	4	6	6
(Slovakia) Ľ Kurhajcová	6	2	2
WC	(Slovenia) A Klepač	1	6	3
(Czech Republic) Z Ondrášková	6	2	6
(Croatia) S Mamić	2	3
8	(Italy) R Vinci	6	6

Second round
(Germany) V Henke	6	7
(Russia) E Bychkova	4	5
(United States) M Tu	6	2	6
7	(Czech Republic) I Benešová	4	6	4
4	(Czech Republic) K Koukalová	0	7	6
(Germany) S Klösel	6	5	2
(Czech Republic) Z Ondrášková	4	4
8	(Italy) R Vinci	6	6

Quarterfinals
(Germany) V Henke	6	6
(United States) M Tu	2	0
4	(Czech Republic) K Koukalová	7	7
8	(Italy) R Vinci	5	6^{1}

Semifinals
(Germany) V Henke	3	6	1
4	(Czech Republic) K Koukalová	6	3	6

=== Bottom half ===
First round
5	(France) M Bartoli	5	1
(Estonia) M Ani	7	6
(Greece) E Daniilidou	6	5	6
(France) C Pin	2	7	4
(France) S Brémond	7	7
(Croatia) J Kostanić	6^{6}	6^{4}
(Slovakia) M Suchá	5	0
3	(Czech Republic) K Peschke	7	6
6	(Slovenia) K Srebotnik	2	7	6
(Slovakia) H Nagyová	6	6^{4}	3
Q	(Hungary) Á Szávay	3	1
Q	(Germany) A Bachmann	6	6
WC	(Slovenia) M Zec Peškirič	6	6
Q	(Czech Republic) L Průšová	3	3
(Bulgaria) T Pironkova	1	1
2	(Spain) A Medina Garrigues	6	6

Second round
(Estonia) M Ani	6	2	5
(Greece) E Daniilidou	3	6	7
(France) S Brémond	6	6
3	(Czech Republic) K Peschke	0	4
6	(Slovenia) K Srebotnik	7	6
Q	(Germany) A Bachmann	5	3
WC	(Slovenia) M Zec Peškirič	1	2
2	(Spain) A Medina Garrigues	6	6

Quarterfinals
(Greece) E Daniilidou	6	6
(France) S Brémond	4	1
6	(Slovenia) K Srebotnik	6	6
2	(Spain) A Medina Garrigues	3	1

Semifinals
(Greece) E Daniilidou	2	2
6	(Slovenia) K Srebotnik	6	6
