= 2010 Banka Koper Slovenia Open =

- Date: 19–25 July
- Edition: 6th
- Category: WTA International
- Draw: 32S / 16D
- Prize money: $220,000
- Surface: Hard / outdoor
- Location: Portorož, Slovenia

Champions

Singles
- (Russia) Anna Chakvetadze

Doubles
- (Russia) Maria Kondratieva / (Czech Republic) Vladimíra Uhlířová
← 2009 ·	Banka Koper Slovenia Open	· 2021 →

The 2010 Banka Koper Slovenia Open was a women's tennis tournament played on outdoor hard courts. It was the 5th edition of the Banka Koper Slovenia Open, and was part of the WTA International tournaments of the 2010 WTA Tour. It took place in Portorož, Slovenia, from 19 July through 25 July 2010. Unseeded Anna Chakvetadze won the singles title.

== Finals ==
=== Singles ===
(Russia) Anna Chakvetadze defeated (Sweden) Johanna Larsson, 6–1, 6–2

- It was Chakvetadze's first title of the year and 8th of her career.

=== Doubles ===
(Russia) Maria Kondratieva / (Czech Republic) Vladimíra Uhlířová defeated (Russia) Anna Chakvetadze / (New Zealand) Marina Erakovic, 6–4, 2–6, [10–7]

== Entrants ==
=== Seeds ===
Player	Nationality	Ranking*	Seeding
Jelena Janković	Serbia	2	1
Petra Kvitová	Czech Republic	29	2
Anastasia Pavlyuchenkova	Russia	31	3
Sara Errani	Italy	34	4
Dominika Cibulková	Slovakia	42	5
Vera Dushevina	Russia	53	6
Polona Hercog	Slovenia	57	7
Sofia Arvidsson	Sweden	62	8

- Seedings are based on the rankings of July 12, 2010.

=== Other entrants ===
The following players received wildcards into the singles main draw

- (Slovenia) Andreja Klepač
- (Austria) Tamira Paszek
- (Slovenia) Katarina Srebotnik

The following players received entry from the qualifying draw:

- (Russia) Elena Bovina
- (Russia) Alexandra Panova
- (Georgia (country)) Anna Tatishvili
- (Belarus) Anastasiya Yakimova
