= Taja Mohorčič =

Slovenian tennis player

- Full name: Taja Mohorčič
- Country (sports): Slovenia
- Born: 24 April 1989 (age 35); SFR Yugoslavia
- Prize money: $5,940

Singles
- Career record: 8–27
- Career titles: 0
- Highest ranking: 957 (25 February 2008)

Doubles
- Career record: 10–16
- Career titles: 0
- Highest ranking: 733 (26 November 2007)

Taja Mohorčič (born 24 April 1989) is a retired Slovenian tennis player. On 25 February 2008, Mohorčič reached her best singles ranking of world number 957. On 26 November 2007, she peaked at world number 733 in the doubles rankings.

Mohorčič made her WTA tour debut at the 2007 Banka Koper Slovenia Open, partnering Petra Pajalič in doubles. The pair lost their first round match against Sybille Bammer and Polona Hercog.

== ITF finals (0–2) ==
=== Doubles (0–2) ===
Legend $100,000 tournaments $75,000 tournaments $50,000 tournaments $25,000 tournaments $10,000 tournaments	Finals by surface Hard (0–1) Clay (0–1) Grass (0–0) Carpet (0–0)

Outcome	No.	Date	Tournament	Surface	Partner	Opponents	Score
Runner-up	1.	27 August 2007	Pörtschach, Austria	Clay	(Serbia) Nataša Zorić	(Austria) Stefanie Haidner (Austria) Eva-Maria Hoch	2–6, 2–6
Runner-up	2.	9 March 2009	Las Palmas, Spain	Hard	(Russia) Yana Buchina	(China) Lu Jingjing (China) Sun Shengnan	3–6, 6–7^{(1–7)}
