= 2005 Banka Koper Slovenia Open – Doubles =

Doubles
- 2005 Banka Koper Slovenia Open

Final
- Champion: (Spain) Anabel Medina Garrigues (Italy) Roberta Vinci
- Runner-up: (Croatia) Jelena Kostanić (Slovenia) Katarina Srebotnik
- Score: 6–4, 5–7, 6–2

Events
Singles	Doubles
Banka Koper Slovenia Open	· 2006 →

The doubles Tournament at the 2005 Banka Koper Slovenia Open took place in mid-September on outdoor hard courts in Portorož, Slovenia.

Anabel Medina Garrigues and Roberta Vinci emerged as the winners.

== Seeds ==
1. (Ukraine) Yuliya Beygelzimer / (Slovakia) Janette Husárová (semifinals)
2. (Croatia) Jelena Kostanić / (Slovenia) Katarina Srebotnik (final)
3. (Czech Republic) Květa Peschke / (United States) Meilen Tu (quarterfinals)
4. (Spain) Anabel Medina Garrigues / (Italy) Roberta Vinci (winners)

== Draw ==
=== Key ===
- Q = Qualifier
- WC = Wild card
- LL = Lucky loser
- Alt = Alternate
- SE = Special exempt
- PR = Protected ranking
- ITF = ITF entry
- JE = Junior exempt
- w/o = Walkover
- r = Retired
- d = Defaulted
- SR = Special ranking

=== Results ===
First round
1	(Ukraine) Y Beygelzimer (Slovakia) J Husárová	5	6	6
Q	(Hungary) Z Gubacsi (Russia) A Kudryavtseva	7	2	3
(Austria) D Klemenschits (Austria) S Klemenschits	6	6
(United Kingdom) C Curran (Slovakia) Ľ Kurhajcová	1	1
4	(Spain) A Medina Garrigues (Italy) R Vinci	6	6
(Czech Republic) L Hradecká (Czech Republic) V Uhlířová	4	2
(Hungary) Á Szávay (Germany) K Wörle	6	3	1
(Czech Republic) I Benešová (Slovakia) H Nagyová	2	6	6
(Slovenia) T Križan (Croatia) S Talaja	3	0
(Greece) E Daniilidou (Germany) J Wöhr	6	6
WC	(Russia) E Bychkova (Slovenia) A Klepač	7	1	0
3	(Czech Republic) K Peschke (United States) M Tu	5	6	6
(Germany) V Henke (Germany) S Klösel	4	4
(Bosnia and Herzegovina) M Jugić-Salkić (Croatia) D Jurak	6	6
(Poland) K Jans (Poland) A Rosolska	1	4
2	(Croatia) J Kostanić (Slovenia) K Srebotnik	6	6

Quarterfinals
1	(Ukraine) Y Beygelzimer (Slovakia) J Husárová	6	6
(Austria) D Klemenschits (Austria) S Klemenschits	3	4
4	(Spain) A Medina Garrigues (Italy) R Vinci	7	6^{6}	7
(Czech Republic) I Benešová (Slovakia) H Nagyová	6^{5}	7	6^{3}
(Greece) E Daniilidou (Germany) J Wöhr	w/o
3	(Czech Republic) K Peschke (United States) M Tu
(Bosnia and Herzegovina) M Jugić-Salkić (Croatia) D Jurak	1	0
2	(Croatia) J Kostanić (Slovenia) K Srebotnik	6	6

Semifinals
1	(Ukraine) Y Beygelzimer (Slovakia) J Husárová	1	5
4	(Spain) A Medina Garrigues (Italy) R Vinci	6	7
(Greece) E Daniilidou (Germany) J Wöhr	6^{1}	4
2	(Croatia) J Kostanić (Slovenia) K Srebotnik	7	6

Final
4	(Spain) A Medina Garrigues (Italy) R Vinci	6	5	6
2	(Croatia) J Kostanić (Slovenia) K Srebotnik	4	7	2
