= Ekaterina Dranets =

Russian tennis player

- Country (sports): Russia
- Born: July 5, 1987 (age 37)
- Turned pro: 2003
- Retired: 2011
- Plays: Right Handed
- Prize money: $ 30,677

Singles
- Career record: 68 - 143
- Career titles: 0
- Highest ranking: No. 489 (13 October 2008)

Doubles
- Career record: 26 - 68
- Career titles: 0
- Highest ranking: No. 400 (26 May 2008)

Ekaterina Dranets (Russian: Екатерина Дранец; born 5 July 1987) is a retired professional Russian tennis player.

Dranets has career-high WTA rankings of 489 in singles, achieved on 13 October 2008, and 400 in doubles, set on 26 May 2008. Her only WTA Tour main draw appearance came at the 2007 Banka Koper Slovenia Open, where she partnered Ivana Lisjak in the doubles event.

== ITF finals ==
$10,000 tournaments

=== Doubles (0 titles, 1 runner–ups) ===
Result	W–L	Date	Tournament	Tier	Surface	Partnering	Opponents	Score
Loss	0–1	Oct 2004	ITF Campo Grande, Brazil	10,000	Clay	(Uruguay) Estefanía Craciún	(Ecuador) Estefania Balda Álvarez (Brazil) Roxane Vaisemberg	1–6, 4–6
