= Petra Pajalič =

Slovenian tennis player

- Country (sports): Slovenia
- Born: 1 June 1988 (age 36); Ljubljana, SR Slovenia, SFR Yugoslavia
- Retired: 2010
- Plays: Right-handed (two-handed backhand)
- Prize money: $14,526

Singles
- Career record: 27–63
- Career titles: 0
- Highest ranking: No. 532 (8 September 2008)

Doubles
- Career record: 33–46
- Career titles: 1 ITF
- Highest ranking: No. 393 (21 April 2008)

Petra Pajalič (born 1 June 1988) is a retired Slovenian tennis player, who specialised in doubles.

Pajalič has career-high WTA rankings of 532 in singles, achieved on 8 September 2008, and 393 in doubles, set on 21 April 2008. She won one doubles title on the ITF Women's Circuit.

Pajalič made her main-draw debut on the WTA Tour in doubles competition at the 2007 Banka Koper Slovenia Open, partnering Taja Mohorčič The pair lost their first round match against Sybille Bammer and Polona Hercog.

== Personal life ==
She speaks English and Slovenian. She received a law degree from Bežigrad Grammar School. Pajalič retired from professional in 2010. Petra Pajalič Studio Moderna, an e-commerce and direct-to-consumer advertising company operating mainly in Central and Eastern Europe, works in the field of marketing.

== ITF finals ==
Legend
$10,000 tournaments

=== Doubles (1 titles, 4 runner–ups) ===
Result	W–L	Date	Tournament	Tier	Surface	Partnering	Opponents	Score
Win	1–0	July 2007	ITF Gausdal, Norway	10,000	Hard	(Slovenia) Maja Kambič	(Ukraine) Tetyana Arefyeva (Ukraine) Elena Jirnova	7–6^{(3)}, 5–7, 6–3
Loss	1–1	Apr 2008	ITF Telde, Spain	10,000	Clay	(France) Anne-Valerie Evain	(Netherlands) Chayenne Ewijk (Germany) Dominice Ripoll	2–6, 6–3, [4–10]
Loss	1–2	Oct 2008	ITF Valencia, Venezuela	10,000	Hard	(United States) Katie Ruckert	(Brazil) Ana Clara Duarte (Brazil) Carla Tiene	2–6, 6–7^{(6)}
Loss	1–3	Nov 2008	ITF Valencia, Venezuela	10,000	Hard	(United States) Katie Ruckert	(Brazil) Ana Clara Duarte (Brazil) Carla Tiene	7–5, 6–7^{(1)} [4–10]
Loss	1–4	Sep 2009	ITF Brčko, Bosnia and Herzegovina	10,000	Clay	(Romania) Patricia Chirea	(Serbia) Karolina Jovanović (Serbia) Teodora Mirčić	4–6, 1–6

== ITF Junior Circuit finals ==
Category G4
Category G5

=== Doubles (1–2) ===
Result	W–L	Date	Location	Grade	Surface	Partner	Opponents	Score
Loss	0–1	March 2004	Oran, Algeria	G5	Clay	(Slovenia) Maja Kambič	(Austria) Rebekka Seipel (South Africa) Justine Sutherland	2–6, 6–7
Loss	0–2	March 2004	Sidi Fredj, Algeria	G4	Clay	(Slovenia) Maja Kambič	(South Africa) Claudia Sanua (South Africa) Justine Sutherland	5–7, 5–7
Win	1–2	October 2004	Mali Lošinj, Croatia	G4	Clay	(Slovenia) Taja Mohorčič	(Slovenia) Tadeja Majerič (Croatia) Petra Martić	4–6, 6–3, 6–4
