= 2007 Banka Koper Slovenia Open – Singles =

Singles
- 2007 Banka Koper Slovenia Open

Final
- Champion: (France) Tatiana Golovin
- Runner-up: (Slovenia) Katarina Srebotnik
- Score: 2–6, 6–4, 6–4

Events
| Singles | Doubles |
| ← 2006 · | Banka Koper Slovenia Open | · 2008 → |

The singles Tournament at the 2007 Banka Koper Slovenia Open took place between September 17 and September 23 on outdoor hard courts in Portorož, Slovenia. Tatiana Golovin won the title, defeating Katarina Srebotnik in the final.

== Seeds ==
1. (France) Tatiana Golovin (champion)
2. (Austria) Sybille Bammer (quarterfinals)
3. (Ukraine) Alona Bondarenko (withdrew)
4. (Slovenia) Katarina Srebotnik (final)
5. (Russia) Vera Zvonareva (quarterfinals)
6. (France) Émilie Loit (quarterfinals)
7. (Argentina) Gisela Dulko (semifinals)
8. (Russia) Vera Dushevina (semifinals)

== Draw ==
=== Key ===
- Q = Qualifier
- WC = Wild card
- LL = Lucky loser
- Alt = Alternate
- SE = Special exempt
- PR = Protected ranking
- ITF = ITF entry
- JE = Junior exempt
- w/o = Walkover
- r = Retired
- d = Defaulted
- SR = Special ranking

=== Finals ===
Semifinals
1 | (France) Tatiana Golovin | 7 | 6
8 | (Russia) Vera Dushevina | 6^{5} | 2
4 | (Slovenia) Katarina Srebotnik | 6 | 6
7 | (Argentina) Gisela Dulko | 2 | 3

Finals
1 | (France) Tatiana Golovin | 2 | 6 | 6
4 | (Slovenia) Katarina Srebotnik | 6 | 4 | 4

=== Top half ===
First round
1 | (France) T Golovin | 6 | 1 | 6
(United States) L Osterloh | 1 | 6 | 1
LL | (Czech Republic) R Voráčová | 6 | 1 | 6^{3}
(Italy) K Knapp | 4 | 6 | 7
Q | (Croatia) A Vrljić | 6 | 6
WC | (Slovenia) A Klepač | 2 | 4
(Croatia) J Kostanić Tošić | 4 | 6^{3}
(United States) M Tu | 6 | 7
3 | (Russia) V Zvonareva | 6 | 6
(France) O Sanchez | 3 | 3
(France) N Dechy | 6 | 3 | 7
(Germany) A Kerber | 3 | 6 | 6^{5}
(Italy) ME Camerin | 2 | 6 | 6^{5}
(Czech Republic) I Benešová | 6 | 2 | 7
Q | (Croatia) N Ožegović | 2 | 1
8 | (Russia) V Dushevina | 6 | 6

Second round
1 | (France) T Golovin | 6 | 6
(Italy) K Knapp | 4 | 3
Q | (Croatia) A Vrljić | 6^{1} | 0
(United States) M Tu | 7 | 6
3 | (Russia) V Zvonareva | 6 | 5 | 6
(France) N Dechy | 0 | 7 | 4
(Czech Republic) I Benešová | 4 | 4
8 | (Russia) V Dushevina | 6 | 6

Quarterfinals
1 | (France) T Golovin | 6 | 6
(United States) M Tu | 3 | 2
3 | (Russia) V Zvonareva | 4 | 6 | 6^{3}
8 | (Russia) V Dushevina | 6 | 3 | 7

Semifinals
1 | (France) T Golovin | 7 | 6
8 | (Russia) V Dushevina | 6^{5} | 2

=== Bottom half ===
First round
6 | (France) É Loit | 6 | 6
(Germany) G Arn | 2 | 4
Q | (Italy) N Viérin | 6 | 6
(Russia) A Lapushchenkova | 0 | 1
Q | (Slovakia) M Rybáriková | 1 | 4
(United States) M Shaughnessy | 6 | 6
WC | (Slovenia) M Zec Peškirič | 0 | 0
4 | (Slovenia) K Srebotnik | 6 | 6
7 | (Argentina) G Dulko | 6 | 6
(Switzerland) E Gagliardi | 3 | 4
WC | (Slovenia) P Hercog | 3 | 7 | 4
(Russia) E Vesnina | 6 | 6^{6} | 6
(Russia) E Likhovtseva | 7 | 6
(Czech Republic) K Zakopalová | 6^{8} | 2
(Austria) Y Meusburger | 2 | 1
2 | (Austria) S Bammer | 6 | 6

Second round
6 | (France) É Loit | 6 | 6
Q | (Italy) N Viérin | 3 | 4
(United States) M Shaughnessy | 2 | 0
4 | (Slovenia) K Srebotnik | 6 | 6
7 | (Argentina) G Dulko | 7 | 6
(Russia) E Vesnina | 6^{3} | 1
(Russia) E Likhovtseva | 3 | 2
2 | (Austria) S Bammer | 6 | 6

Quarterfinals
6 | (France) É Loit | 3 | 3
4 | (Slovenia) K Srebotnik | 6 | 6
7 | (Argentina) G Dulko | 7 | 1 | 6
2 | (Austria) S Bammer | 6^{3} | 6 | 1

Semifinals
4 | (Slovenia) K Srebotnik | 6 | 6
7 | (Argentina) G Dulko | 2 | 3
