= 2007 Banka Koper Slovenia Open =

- Date: September 17–23
- Edition: 3rd
- Category: WTA Tier IV
- Surface: Hard / Outdoor
- Location: Portorož, Slovenia

Champions

Singles
- (France) Tatiana Golovin

Doubles
- (Czech Republic) Lucie Hradecká / (Czech Republic) Renata Voráčová
← 2006 ·	Banka Koper Slovenia Open	· 2008 →

The 2007 Banka Koper Slovenia Open was a tennis tournament played on outdoor hard courts. It was the 3rd edition of the Banka Koper Slovenia Open, and was part of the WTA Tier IV tournaments of the 2007 WTA Tour. It was held in Portorož, Slovenia, from September 17 through September 23, 2007.

== Points and prize money ==
=== Point distribution ===
Event	W	F	SF	QF	Round of 16	Round of 32	Q	Q3	Q2	Q1
Singles	115	80	50	30	15	1	7	3	2	1
Doubles	115	80	50	30	1	—	—	—	—	—

=== Prize money ===
Event	W	F	SF	QF	Round of 16	Round of 32	Q3	Q2	Q1
Singles	$21,140	$11,395	$6,140	$3,310	$1,775	$955	$515	$280	$165
Doubles *	$6,240	$3,360	$1,810	$970	$550	—	—	—	—

_{* per team}

== Singles main-draw entrants ==
=== Seeds ===
Country	Player	Rank	Seed
FRA	Tatiana Golovin	19	1
AUT	Sybille Bammer	20	2
UKR	Alona Bondarenko	21	3
SLO	Katarina Srebotnik	24	4
RUS	Vera Zvonareva	29	5
FRA	Émilie Loit	42	6
ARG	Gisela Dulko	43	7
RUS	Vera Dushevina	45	8

=== Other entrants ===
The following players received wildcards into the singles main draw:

- (Slovenia) Polona Hercog
- (Slovenia) Andreja Klepač
- (Slovenia) Maša Zec Peškirič

The following players received entry from the qualifying draw:

- (Croatia) Nika Ožegović
- (Slovakia) Magdaléna Rybáriková
- (Italy) Nathalie Viérin
- (Croatia) Ana Vrljić

The following players received entries as lucky losers:

- (Czech Republic) Renata Voráčová

=== Retirements ===
- (Ukraine) Alona Bondarenko
- (United States) Ahsha Rolle (right knee sprain)
- (Russia) Alina Jidkova (dizziness)
- (Czech Republic) Nicole Vaidišová (right wrist injury)

== Doubles main-draw entrants ==
=== Seeds ===
Country	Player	Country	Player	Rank	Seed
FRA	Émilie Loit	USA	Meilen Tu	78	1
ITA	Maria Elena Camerin	ARG	Gisela Dulko	82	2
CZE	Lucie Hradecká	CZE	Renata Voráčová	104	3
POL	Klaudia Jans	POL	Alicja Rosolska	152	4

=== Other entrants ===
The following pairs received wildcards into the doubles main draw:

- (Slovenia) Jasmina Kajtazovič / (Slovenia) Tina Obrež

=== Retirements ===
- (Croatia) Ivana Lisjak (Right elbow injury)

== Champions ==
=== Singles ===
(France) Tatiana Golovin def. (Slovenia) Katarina Srebotnik, 2–6, 6–4, 6–4

=== Doubles ===
(Czech Republic) Lucie Hradecká / (Czech Republic) Renata Voráčová def. (Slovenia) Andreja Klepač / (Russia) Elena Likhovtseva, 5–7, 6–4, 10–7
