= 2010 Banka Koper Slovenia Open – Singles =

Women's tennis tournament

Singles
- 2010 Banka Koper Slovenia Open

Final
- Champion: (Russia) Anna Chakvetadze
- Runner-up: (Sweden) Johanna Larsson
- Score: 6–1, 6–2

Details
- Draw: 32
- Seeds: 8

Events
| Singles | Doubles |
- Banka Koper Slovenia Open

Dinara Safina was the defending champion, but she chose not to participate.

Anna Chakvetadze won the title, defeating Johanna Larsson in the final, 6–1, 6–2. This was the final WTA singles title that Chakvetadze won before her retirement in 2013.

== Seeds ==
1. (Serbia) Jelena Janković (second round, retired due to left ankle injury)
2. (Czech Republic) Petra Kvitová (first round)
3. (Russia) Anastasia Pavlyuchenkova (quarterfinals)
4. (Italy) Sara Errani (second round)
5. (Slovakia) Dominika Cibulková (first round)
6. (Russia) Vera Dushevina (quarterfinals)
7. (Slovenia) Polona Hercog (semifinals)
8. (Sweden) Sofia Arvidsson (first round)

== Main draw ==
Key

- Q = Qualifier
- WC = Wild card
- LL = Lucky loser
- Alt = Alternate
- ITF = ITF entry
- PR = Protected ranking
- SR = Special ranking
- SE = Special exempt
- JE = Junior exempt
- JR = Junior Accelerator Programme entrant
- CO = College Accelerator Programme entrant
- NG = Next Gen Accelerator Program entrant
- w/o = Walkover
- r = Retired
- d = Defaulted

=== Finals ===
Semifinals
(Russia) Ksenia Pervak | 2 | 0^{r}
(Sweden) Johanna Larsson | 6 | 1
(Russia) Anna Chakvetadze | 0 | 6 | 6
7 | (Slovenia) Polona Hercog | 6 | 2 | 2

Final
(Sweden) Johanna Larsson | 1 | 2
(Russia) Anna Chakvetadze | 6 | 6

=== Top half ===
First round
1 | (Serbia) J Janković | 6 | 6
(Serbia) B Jovanovski | 3 | 3
(Slovenia) M Zec Peškirič | 6 | 2 | 3
Q | (Belarus) A Yakimova | 3 | 6 | 6
PR | (New Zealand) M Erakovic | 2 | 6^{5}
Q | (Russia) A Panova | 6 | 7
(Russia) K Pervak | 6 | 6
5 | (Slovakia) D Cibulková | 1 | 3
3 | (Russia) A Pavlyuchenkova | 7 | 6
(Italy) A Brianti | 5 | 1
WC | (Slovenia) A Klepač | 3 | 4
(Paraguay) R de los Ríos | 6 | 6
(Italy) ME Camerin | 4 | 6 | 6
(Australia) A Rodionova | 6 | 2 | 4
(Sweden) J Larsson | 7 | 6
8 | (Sweden) S Arvidsson | 6^{1} | 2

Second round
1 | (Serbia) J Janković | 6 | 3 | 0^{r}
Q | (Belarus) A Yakimova | 1 | 6 | 1
Q | (Russia) A Panova | 2 | 5
(Russia) K Pervak | 6 | 7
3 | (Russia) A Pavlyuchenkova | 6 | 6
(Paraguay) R de los Ríos | 3 | 0
(Italy) ME Camerin | 5 | 1
(Sweden) J Larsson | 7 | 6

Quarterfinals
Q | (Belarus) A Yakimova | 2 | 6 | 1
(Russia) K Pervak | 6 | 2 | 6
3 | (Russia) A Pavlyuchenkova | 3 | 2
(Sweden) J Larsson | 6 | 6

Semifinals
(Russia) K Pervak | 2 | 0^{r}
(Sweden) J Larsson | 6 | 1

=== Bottom half ===
First round
6 | (Russia) V Dushevina | 2 | 6 | 6
(Russia) A Lapushchenkova | 6 | 3 | 3
(France) V Razzano | 6 | 7
(Slovakia) Z Kučová | 2 | 5
(Russia) E Makarova | 4 | 1
(Russia) A Chakvetadze | 6 | 6
Q | (Georgia (country)) A Tatishvili | 6^{1} | 4
4 | (Italy) S Errani | 7 | 6
7 | (Slovenia) P Hercog | 6 | 6
Q | (Russia) E Bovina | 3 | 3
(Croatia) P Martić | 3 | 1
WC | (Slovenia) K Srebotnik | 6 | 6
WC | (Austria) T Paszek | 7 | 6
PR | (Croatia) J Kostanić Tošić | 5 | 2
(Switzerland) S Vögele | 7 | 6
2 | (Czech Republic) P Kvitová | 5 | 2

Second round
6 | (Russia) V Dushevina | 4 | 7 | 6
(France) V Razzano | 6 | 5 | 2
(Russia) A Chakvetadze | 6 | 6
4 | (Italy) S Errani | 1 | 2
7 | (Slovenia) P Hercog | 6 | 6^{3} | 6
WC | (Slovenia) K Srebotnik | 4 | 7 | 3
WC | (Austria) T Paszek | 5 | 4
(Switzerland) S Vögele | 7 | 6

Quarterfinals
6 | (Russia) V Dushevina | 6 | 3 | 5
(Russia) A Chakvetadze | 2 | 6 | 7
7 | (Slovenia) P Hercog | 7 | 7
(Switzerland) S Vögele | 5 | 5

Semifinals
(Russia) A Chakvetadze | 0 | 6 | 6
7 | (Slovenia) P Hercog | 6 | 2 | 2
