= 2010 Banka Koper Slovenia Open – Doubles =

Doubles
- 2010 Banka Koper Slovenia Open

Final
- Champions: (Russia) Maria Kondratieva (Czech Republic) Vladimíra Uhlířová
- Runners-up: (Russia) Anna Chakvetadze (New Zealand) Marina Erakovic
- Score: 6–4, 2–6, [10–7]

Details
- Draw: 16
- Seeds: 4

Events
Singles	Doubles
- Banka Koper Slovenia Open

Julia Görges and Vladimíra Uhlířová were the defending champions, but Görges chose to participate in Bad Gastein.

Uhlířová partnered up with Maria Kondratieva and won in the final against Anna Chakvetadze and Marina Erakovic 6–4, 2–6, [10–7].

== Seeds ==
1. (Russia) Vera Dushevina / (Poland) Klaudia Jans (first round)
2. (Russia) Maria Kondratieva / (Czech Republic) Vladimíra Uhlířová (champions)
3. (Russia) Anastasia Pavlyuchenkova / (Australia) Anastasia Rodionova (semifinals)
4. (Greece) Eleni Daniilidou / (Germany) Jasmin Wöhr (quarterfinals)

== Draw ==
Key

- Q = Qualifier
- WC = Wild card
- LL = Lucky loser
- Alt = Alternate
- ITF = ITF entry
- PR = Protected ranking
- SR = Special ranking
- SE = Special exempt
- JE = Junior exempt
- JR = Junior Accelerator Programme entrant
- CO = College Accelerator Programme entrant
- NG = Next Gen Accelerator Program entrant
- w/o = Walkover
- r = Retired
- d = Defaulted

=== Draw ===
First round
1	(Russia) V Dushevina (Poland) K Jans	6	4	[8]
(Russia) A Chakvetadze (New Zealand) M Erakovic	4	6	[10]
(Slovenia) P Hercog (Croatia) P Martić	6	6
(Italy) A Brianti (Italy) S Errani	3	3
3	(Russia) A Pavlyuchenkova (Australia) A Rodionova	6	6
(Ukraine) Y Fedak (Ukraine) A Vasylyeva	1	1
(Sweden) S Arvidsson (Sweden) J Larsson	6	6
(United Kingdom) A Keothavong (United Kingdom) A Smith	1	4
WC	(Serbia) J Janković (Serbia) A Krunić	6	4	[10]
(Kazakhstan) S Karatantcheva (Georgia (country)) A Tatishvili	3	6	[8]
(Brazil) MF Alves (Italy) N Clerico	3	2
4	(Greece) E Daniilidou (Germany) J Wöhr	6	6
(Turkey) İ Şenoğlu (Belarus) A Yakimova	2	3
WC	(Russia) E Bovina (Slovenia) A Klepač	6	6
(Italy) ME Camerin (Slovenia) M Zec Peškirič	3	5
2	(Russia) M Kondratieva (Czech Republic) V Uhlířová	6	7

Quarterfinals
(Russia) A Chakvetadze (New Zealand) M Erakovic	6	6
(Slovenia) P Hercog (Croatia) P Martić	4	3
3	(Russia) A Pavlyuchenkova (Australia) A Rodionova	5	7	[10]
(Sweden) S Arvidsson (Sweden) J Larsson	7	5	[6]
WC	(Serbia) J Janković (Serbia) A Krunić	4	6	[10]
4	(Greece) E Daniilidou (Germany) J Wöhr	6	4	[6]
WC	(Russia) E Bovina (Slovenia) A Klepač	6^{4}	3
2	(Russia) M Kondratieva (Czech Republic) V Uhlířová	7	6

Semifinals
(Russia) A Chakvetadze (New Zealand) M Erakovic	6	6
3	(Russia) A Pavlyuchenkova (Australia) A Rodionova	2	2
WC	(Serbia) J Janković (Serbia) A Krunić	w/o
2	(Russia) M Kondratieva (Czech Republic) V Uhlířová

Finals
(Russia) A Chakvetadze (New Zealand) M Erakovic	4	6	[7]
2	(Russia) M Kondratieva (Czech Republic) V Uhlířová	6	2	[10]
