= Tina Cvetkovič =

Slovenian tennis player

- Country (sports): Slovenia
- Born: 4 December 2000 (age 25)
- Plays: Left (two-handed backhand)
- Prize money: $17,593

Singles
- Career record: 79–59
- Highest ranking: No. 552 (18 July 2022)

Doubles
- Career record: 27–20
- Career titles: 3 ITF
- Highest ranking: No. 518 (18 July 2022)

Tina Cvetkovič (born 4 December 2000) is an inactive Slovenian tennis player.

Cvetkovič has career-high WTA rankings of 552 in singles and 518 in doubles, both achieved on 18 July 2022.

Cvetkovič made her WTA Tour main-draw debut at the 2021 Slovenia Open, after receiving a wildcard into the doubles tournament.

== ITF Circuit finals ==
=== Singles: 1 (runner-up) ===
Legend $15,000 tournaments	Finals by surface Clay (0–1)

Result	W–L	Date	Tournament	Tier	Surface	Opponent	Score
Loss	0–1	Sep 2020	ITF Otočec, Slovenia	15,000	Clay	(Slovenia) Živa Falkner	0–6, 6–7^{(6–8)}

=== Doubles: 3 (3 titles) ===
Legend $25,000 tournaments $15,000 tournaments	Finals by surface Hard (0–0) Clay (3–0)

Result	W–L	Date	Tournament	Tier	Surface	Partner	Opponents	Score
Win	1–0	Sep 2020	ITF Otočec, Slovenia	15,000	Clay	(Slovenia) Pia Lovrič	(Hungary) Dorka Drahota-Szabó (Hungary) Adrienn Nagy	6–3, 6–1
Win	2–0	Mar 2021	ITF Gonesse, France	15,000	Clay	(United States) Zoe Howard	(Germany) Anna Gabric (Germany) Lena Papadakis	6–7^{(5)}, 6–3, [10–5]
Win	3–0	Jun 2022	ITF Pörtschach, Austria	25,000	Clay	(Czech Republic) Michaela Bayerlová	(Sweden) Caijsa Hennemann (Poland) Martyna Kubka	6–3, 6–3
