= Anna Chakvetadze =

Russian tennis player (born 1987)

Anna Chakvetadze Анна Чакветадзе
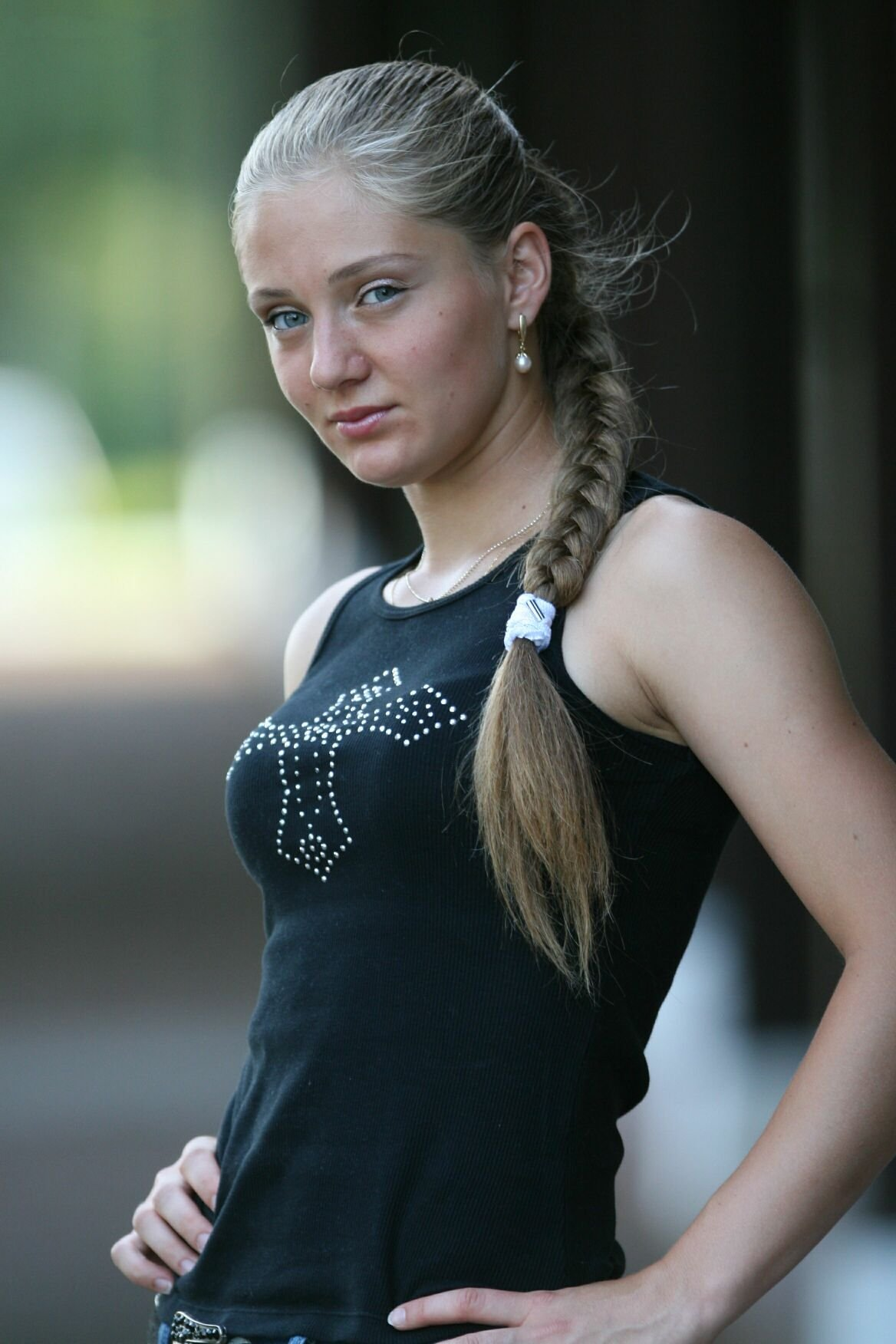
- Chakvetadze in 2007
- Country (sports): Russia
- Born: 5 March 1987 (age 39) Moscow, Soviet Union
- Height: 1.72 m (5 ft 8 in)
- Turned pro: 2003
- Retired: 11 September 2013
- Plays: Right-handed (two-handed backhand)
- Prize money: $3,909,756

Singles
- Career record: 296–170
- Career titles: 8 WTA, 2 ITF
- Highest ranking: No. 5 (10 September 2007)

Grand Slam singles results
- Australian Open: QF (2007)
- French Open: QF (2007)
- Wimbledon: 4R (2008)
- US Open: SF (2007)

Other tournaments
- Tour Finals: SF (2007)

Doubles
- Career record: 38–64
- Career titles: 1 ITF
- Highest ranking: No. 53 (6 August 2007)

Grand Slam doubles results
- Australian Open: 1R (2007–2012)
- French Open: QF (2006)
- Wimbledon: 2R (2007, 2009)
- US Open: 3R (2006)

Team competitions
- Fed Cup: W (2007, 2008), Record 7–3

Anna Djambuliyevna Chakvetadze (Анна Джамбулиевна Чакветадзе; born 5 March 1987) is a Russian former professional tennis player.

In her career, Chakvetadze won eight WTA Tour singles titles. She reached her highest singles ranking of world No. 5 in September 2007, after reaching the US Open semifinals. She also made the quarterfinals of the Australian Open and French Open that same year. She announced her retirement on 11 September 2013, due to a persisting back injury. She is currently a commentator on the Eurosport channel.

== Career ==
Chakvetadze began playing tennis at the age of eight after being introduced to the sport by her mother. She hit her peak of world No. 5 in 2007 after a semifinal appearance at the US Open. Also in that year, she reached the quarterfinals at the Australian Open and the French Open, both of which were career bests for those events. Four of her eight career singles titles also occurred in 2007.

=== Junior tournaments ===
In 2003, she made it to the final of the Junior Championships at Wimbledon before falling to Kirsten Flipkens in three sets. The same year, she won the International Bavarian Junior Challenge, defeating Marta Domachowska in two sets. Her record as a junior was 67–19 in singles, and 22–14 in doubles; her highest world ranking was No. 22, achieved in December 2003.

=== Professional tournaments ===
==== 2001–2006: Early career and entering top 50 ====
Chakvetadze debuted on the ITF Women's Circuit in November 2001, losing in the first round in Minsk. In July 2002, she won her first doubles title in Istanbul, teaming with fellow Russian Irina Kotkina.

At the 2004 US Open, Chakvetadze won three qualifying matches to reach the main draw of her first Grand Slam singles tournament. In the second round, she defeated world No. 3, Anastasia Myskina, before losing in the third round to Eleni Daniilidou. With this result, she became tied for the second fastest player to defeat a top-10 player in WTA history, tying Serena Williams. She broke into the top 100 in the WTA rankings in September, reaching world No. 91. She reached the top 50 in June 2005, coming in at world No. 44.

On 25 September 2006, Chakvetadze won her first WTA Tour singles tournament at the Tier III event in Guangzhou, defeating Anabel Medina Garrigues in the final. Two weeks later, she won her second WTA title at the Tier I Kremlin Cup in Moscow even though she was unseeded, beating Elena Dementieva and Nadia Petrova en route to the title. These wins helped boost her ranking to world No. 16.

==== 2007: Breakthrough year, world No. 5 ====
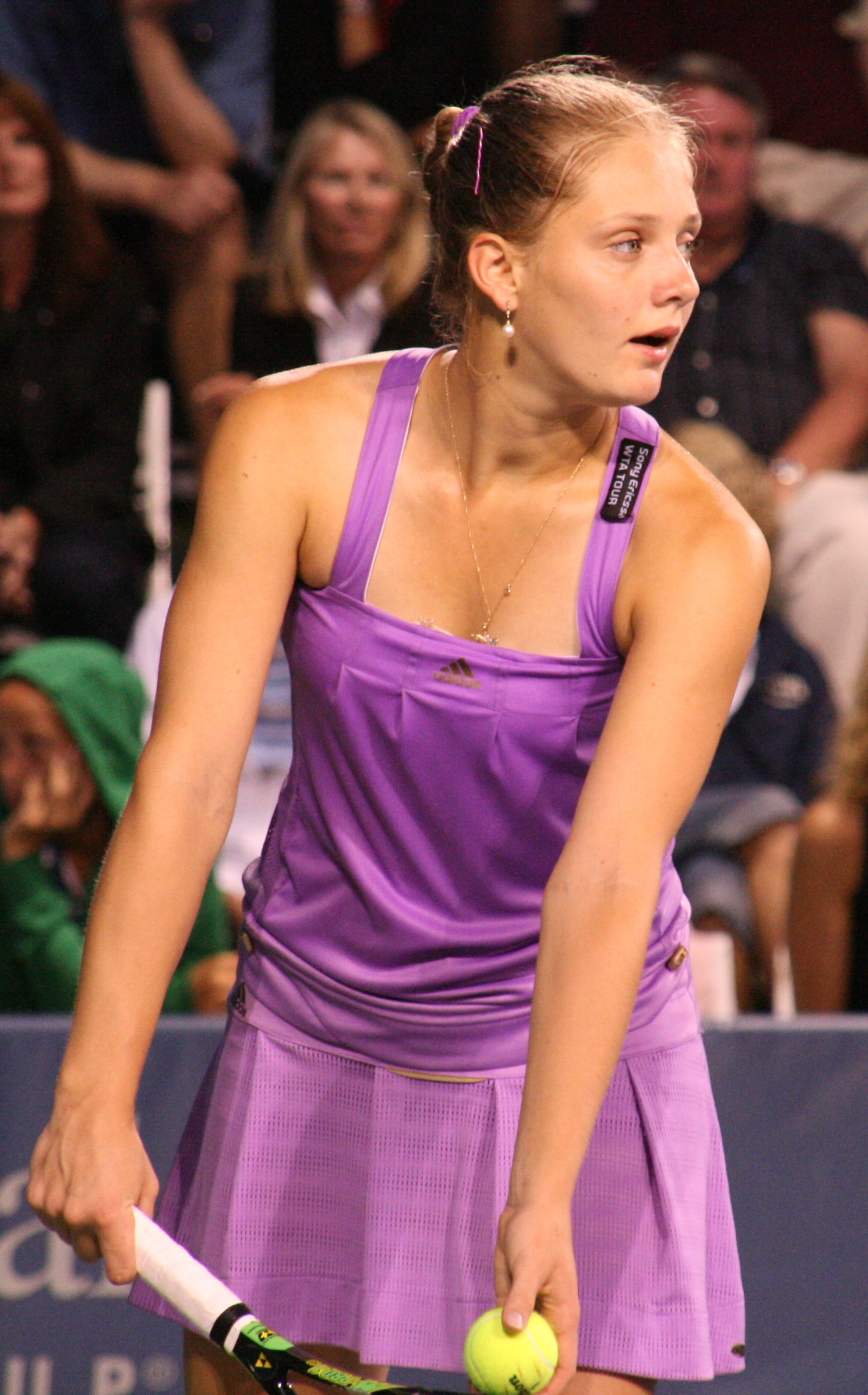
Chakvetadze at the 2007 San Diego Open

Chakvetadze started the year by winning the Tier IV Hobart International in Australia, her third career title. She defeated fellow Russian Vasilisa Bardina in the final. Seeded 12th at the Australian Open, she defeated eighth-seeded Patty Schnyder in the fourth round, before losing in the quarterfinals to top seed Maria Sharapova.

In February, Chakvetadze reached the quarterfinals of the Open Gaz de France in Paris where she lost to Amélie Mauresmo. She then competed in Antwerp where she lost in the semifinals to Mauresmo, in three sets. On February 19, she made her top-ten debut in the WTA rankings, at world No. 10. At the Tier I Indian Wells Open, she lost in the fourth round to Shahar Pe'er. She then reached the semifinals of the Tier I Miami Open in Key Biscayne where she was defeated by world No. 1, Justine Henin, in straight sets.

Chakvetadze played four tournaments in Europe on red clay courts. She lost in the quarterfinals of the Tier II Warsaw Open to Jelena Janković, the second round of the Tier I German Open in Berlin, and the second round of the Tier I Italian Open in Rome. At the French Open, Chakvetadze lost to second seed Sharapova in the quarterfinals.

She won her second title in that year and first grass court title in 's-Hertogenbosch, with wins over Daniela Hantuchová and Janković. At Wimbledon, however, she was defeated in the third round by 31st-seeded Michaëlla Krajicek in three sets.

Chakvetadze then played five tournaments during the North American summer hardcourt season. At the Tier III Cincinnati Open, she was the top seed and won the title, defeating Akiko Morigami in the final. She won her second consecutive tournament the following week at the Bank of the West Classic in Palo Alto, the first tournament of the US Open Series. She defeated Sania Mirza in the final. That was her ninth consecutive match-victory and resulted in her ranking rising to world No. 6. At the San Diego Open, her 12-match winning streak ended when she lost in the semifinals to top-seeded Sharapova for the third time this year, after Chakvetadze had defeated reigning Wimbledon champion Venus Williams in the quarterfinals, in three sets. Two weeks later, at the Tier I Canadian Open in Toronto, Chakvetadze retired from her second-round match, after losing the first set to Virginie Razzano. At the US Open, she was the sixth seed and reached the semifinals of a Grand Slam tournament for the first time, losing to Svetlana Kuznetsova in three sets. This result caused her ranking to rise to a career high of world No. 5.

Chakvetadze was the defending champion at the Kremlin Cup in Moscow, but lost her second-round match to Dinara Safina. She became the sixth player in 2007 to qualify for the year-ending Tour Championships. She reached the semifinals of that tournament by winning two of her three round-robin matches, defeating Serena Williams and Janković before losing to Henin. She then lost her semifinal match against Sharapova.

==== 2008: Continued success ====
Chakvetadze began her season at the Sydney International. Seeded fifth, she lost in the first round to Katarina Srebotnik. Seeded sixth at the Australian Open, Chakvetadze was defeated in the third round by 27th seed Maria Kirilenko.

Chakvetadze helped Russia win its first-round tie against Israel during the Fed Cup by defeating Tzipora Obziler. As the top seed at the Open Gaz de France, Chakvetadze won the title by defeating seventh seed Ágnes Szávay in the final. Seeded second at the Proximus Diamond Games, Chakvetadze suffered a second-round upset at the hands of lucky loser Sofia Arvidsson. Seeded fifth at the Qatar Ladies Open, Chakvetadze lost in the second round to Li Na. Seeded sixth at the Dubai Championships, she retired from her quarterfinal match against fourth seed Jelena Janković due to a left thigh injury. After missing Indian Wells, Chakvetadze returned to action at the Miami Open. She was runner-up at the Connecticut Open, losing Caroline Wozniacki in the final.

==== 2009: Out of top 50 ====
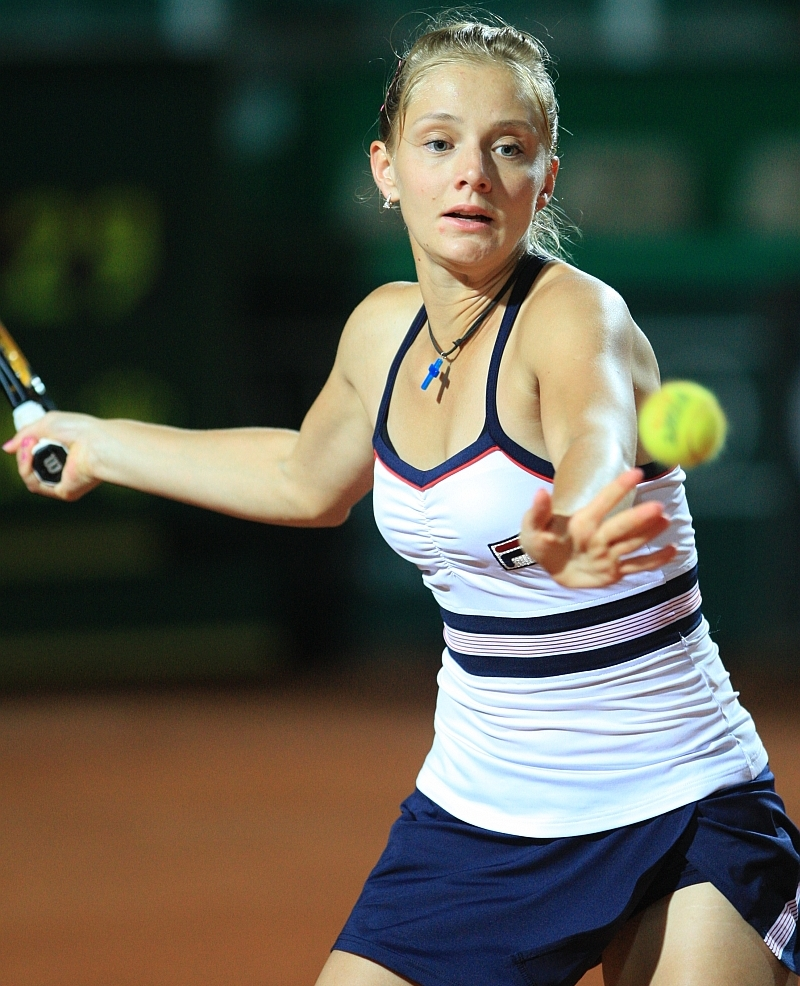
Chakvetadze at the 2009 Italian Open

Seeded third, she began the 2009 season at the Hobart International where she was defeated in the first round by Carla Suárez Navarro. Seeded 17th at the Australian Open, Chakvetadze lost in the second round to Australian wildcard Jelena Dokić.

Playing in the Fed Cup tie versus China, Chakvetadze played one rubber and won over Yan Zi. Russia easily won the tie over China 5–0. Seeded 15th at the Dubai Championships, Chakvetadze was defeated in the first round by Ayumi Morita. Seeded 19th at Indian Wells, she beat Ekaterina Makarova in the second round and lost in the third round to Shahar Pe'er. Seeded 22nd at the Miami Open, Chakvetadze was defeated in the third round by 11th seed and eventual champion Victoria Azarenka. During the Fed Cup semifinal tie versus Italy, she played one rubber and lost to Flavia Pennetta. Italy ended up defeating Russia 4–1 to advance to the Fed Cup final.

Chakvetadze kicked off her clay-court season at the Porsche Tennis Grand Prix. She was defeated in the first round by Flavia Pennetta. In Rome at the Italian Open, Chakvetadze lost a close three-setter in the third round to fourth seed Venus Williams. Competing at the first edition of the Madrid Open, she defeated Virginia Ruano Pascual in the first round. She then beat Sam Stosur in the second round, coming back from 1–4 down in the third set. Chakvetadze fell to Alona Bondarenko in the third round. Chakvetadze, who was seeded 26th at the French Open, suffered a first-round loss to lucky loser Mariana Duque Mariño in three sets, thus continuing her disastrous run.

Playing only one grass-court tournament before Wimbledon at the Eastbourne International, Chakvetadze was able to raise her game in the first round where she defeated third seed Jelena Janković. She was defeated by Marion Bartoli in the second round. Seeded 32nd at the Wimbledon Championships, Chakvetadze lost to Sabine Lisicki in the first round, meaning she was out of the top 50 for the first time in quite a while.

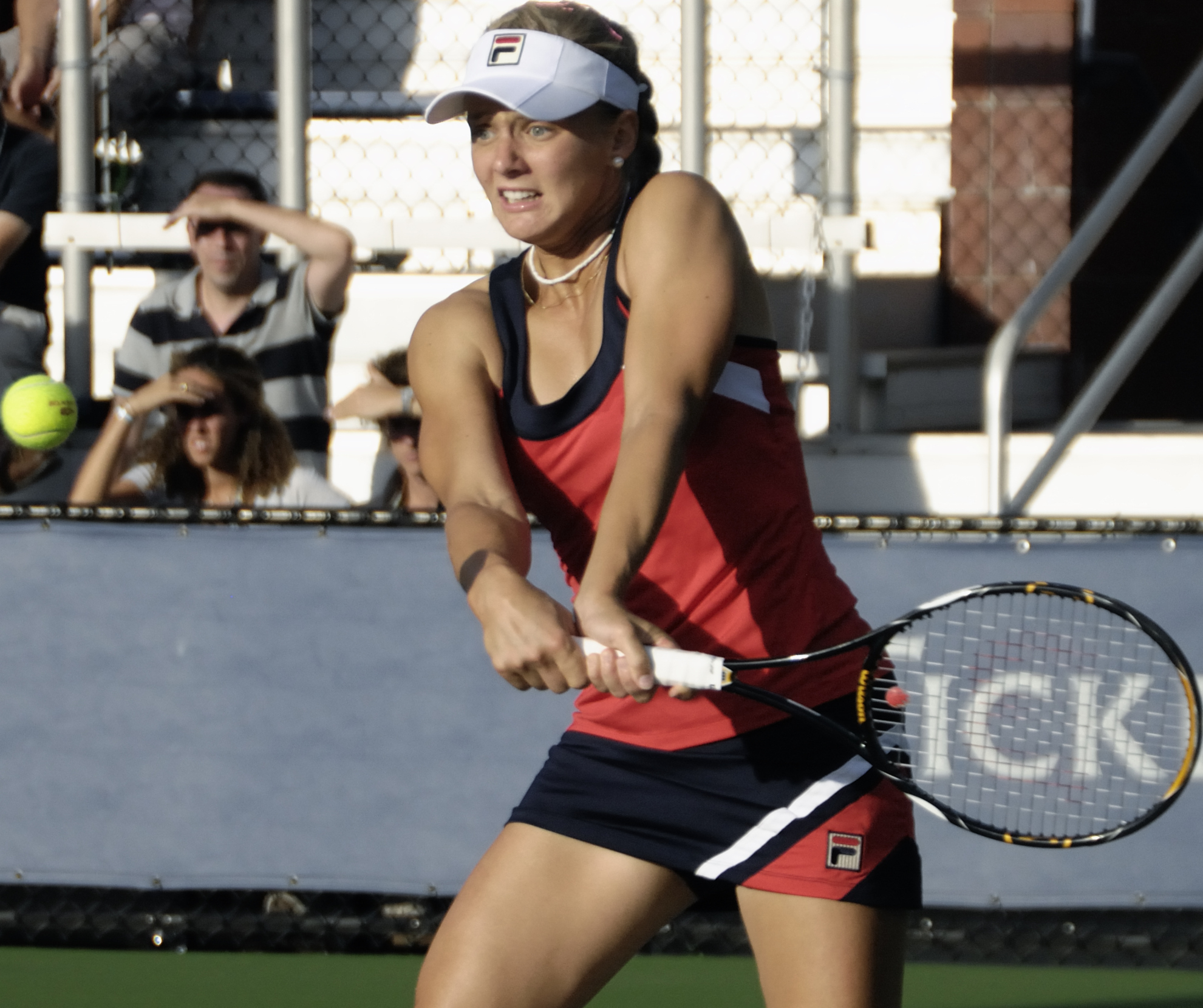
Chakvetadze at the 2009 US Open

Chakvetadze began her US Open Series campaign at the Stanford Classic where she was unseeded. She was defeated in the first round by Maria Kirilenko in three sets. The following week, at the L.A. Championships, she won her first two matches, against 11th seed Virginie Razzano and Alisa Kleybanova, but then lost convincingly to eighth seed Agnieszka Radwańska in the third round. Having won the Cincinnati Open in 2007, Chakvetadze went into the 2009 tournament unseeded; she was defeated in the second round by ninth seed Victoria Azarenka. At the Rogers Cup in Toronto, Chakvetadze lost in the first round to Sybille Bammer, after leading 6–3, 4–1. Her final tournament before the US Open was the Pilot Pen Tennis in New Haven, where she had been a finalist the previous year. She reached her first quarterfinal of the year, defeating Nadia Petrova and Sybille Bammer, all in three sets. She then lost in her quarterfinal match to her good friend Elena Vesnina. Chakvetadze entered the US Open as an unseeded player for the first time since 2005. She defeated Yurika Sema in the first round but then fell in the second round to seventh seed Vera Zvonareva.

Chakvetadze played her final tournament of the year at the Kremlin Cup in Russia, her home country. She was defeated in the first round by Alona Bondarenko.

Chakvetadze ended the year ranked 70, her lowest ranking in over five years.

==== 2010: Return to form and injuries ====
Chakvetadze started the year with a first-round loss at the Auckland Open to wildcard Kimiko Date-Krumm. At the Hobart International, Chakvetadze was defeated in the final round of qualifying by Elena Baltacha. Ranked 66 at the Australian Open, Chakvetadze lost in the first round to 12th seed Flavia Pennetta.

At the Pattaya Open, Chakvetadze was defeated in her quarterfinal match by eventual finalist Tamarine Tanasugarn. In March, she competed at the Indian Wells Open, where she retired with an ankle injury in the second round whilst trailing at 6–2, 5–3 to fifth seed Agnieszka Radwańska. At the Miami Open, Chakvetadze had a first-round loss to Kimiko Date-Krumm.

In May, she played at the Warsaw Open where she fell in the qualifying round to Bojana Jovanovski. At the French Open, Chakvetadze was two points away from winning the match in straight sets, before losing in the first round to Angelique Kerber.

Chakvetadze started her grass-court season at the Birmingham Classic. She advanced to the third round, where she lost to qualifier Alison Riske. At the Eastbourne International, she was defeated in the second round of qualifying by Jarmila Groth. At the Wimbledon Championships, Chakvetadze won her first-round match over Andrea Petkovic. She lost in the second round to top seed, defending champion, and eventual champion Serena Williams.

In Hungary at the Budapest Grand Prix, Chakvetadze fell in the second round to second seed Alexandra Dulgheru. At the Prague Open, she was defeated in the first round by qualifier and compatriot Ksenia Pervak. Playing at the Slovenia Open, she defeated Johanna Larsson in her first final in two years and to win her eighth WTA Tour title. In the Portorož doubles final, she and Marina Erakovic lost to Maria Kondratieva/Vladimíra Uhlířová in a super tie-break. In the first edition of the Danish Open, Chakvetadze not only got through qualifying but she also advanced to the semifinal where she fell to top seed and eventual champion Caroline Wozniacki.

Chakvetadze entered the Bronx Open to prepare for the US Open. She defeated Sofia Arvidsson in the final to win the second title of the year. At the US Open, she suffered a first-round loss to Urszula Radwańska.

Seeded third at the Tashkent Open, Chakvetadze retired in the second round against Evgeniya Rodina due to a viral illness. In Beijing at the China Open, she fell in the second round of qualifying to Kateryna Bondarenko. At the Generali Ladies Linz, she lost in the first round to Sybille Bammer. Her final tournament of the season was the Kremlin Cup. Chakvetadze was defeated in her quarterfinal match by Vera Dushevina.

Chakvetadze won 2010 one singles title, reached two doubles finals, and ended ranked 56.

==== 2011: Illness and injuries ====
Chakvetadze started the year with a first-round loss at the Brisbane International to Ksenia Pervak. At the Hobart International, Chakvetadze was defeated in the first round by seventh seed Sara Errani. Ranked 57 at the Australian Open, she lost in the second round to 25th seed Petra Kvitová.

In Dubai, Chakvetadze defeated Daniela Hantuchová in the first round. In the second round, she faced top seed Caroline Wozniacki. She lost the first set 1–6; she was 5–3 up in the second set when she suddenly collapsed. It was later confirmed that Chakvetadze collapsed due to a gastrointestinal disease that she had been suffering from since before the tournament. As a result, she did not play the Qatar Open. At Indian Wells, Chakvetadze retired during her second-round match against 24th seed Maria Kirilenko due to dizziness. She then missed the Sony Ericsson Open due to illness.

Chakvetadze started her clay-court season at the Stuttgart Grand Prix. After qualifying for the main-draw, she faced Zuzana Kučová in her first-round match. She retired during the third set due to dizziness. Because of these problems, she did not play the French Open.

After a few weeks of hospital testing, Chakvetadze made her return at the Rosmalen Open. She lost in the first round to Lourdes Domínguez Lino. At Wimbledon, Chakvetadze was defeated in the first round by fifth seed Maria Sharapova.

Chakvetadze announced that she would not participate at the US Open because of an ankle injury.

She ended the year ranked 230.

==== 2012: Continued downfall, out of top 500 ====
Chakvetadze started the year at the Hobart International. She made it to the quarterfinals after wins over third seed Monica Niculescu and Tsvetana Pironkova. She retired during her quarterfinal match against sixth seed Shahar Pe'er due to a left leg cramp. At the Australian Open, Chakvetadze lost in the first round to Jelena Dokic.

Chakvetadze took a break from the sport for several months before returning to competition at the Danish Open. As a qualifier, she was defeated in round one by Pauline Parmentier.

After qualifying for the Stuttgart Grand Prix, she was beaten in the first round by fellow qualifier Alizé Cornet. At the Madrid Open, Chakvetadze lost in the final round of qualifying to Johanna Larsson. Qualified for the main draw at the Italian Open, she was defeated in the first round by qualifier Sloane Stephens. At the Brussels Open, Chakvetadze lost in the first round to Yanina Wickmayer.

At the Washington Open, she was defeated again in the first round, by Melinda Czink. At the Bronx Open, Chakvetadze advanced to the final where she lost to top seed Romina Oprandi.

In September, Chakvetadze played at the Tashkent Open in Uzbekistan. After qualifying for the main-draw, she was defeated in the second round by eighth seed Galina Voskoboeva.

Chakvetadze did not play any more tournaments for the rest of the season. She ended the year ranked 222.

==== 2013: Retirement ====
Chakvetadze announced her retirement from professional tennis on 11 September 2013 due to ongoing back problems. Since retiring, she has been a tennis commentator for Eurosport.

==== 2023: Comeback ====
Chakvetadze had enrolled herself to a series of $15k tournaments in doubles, playing one match, possibly denoting a decision to comeback.

== Playing style ==
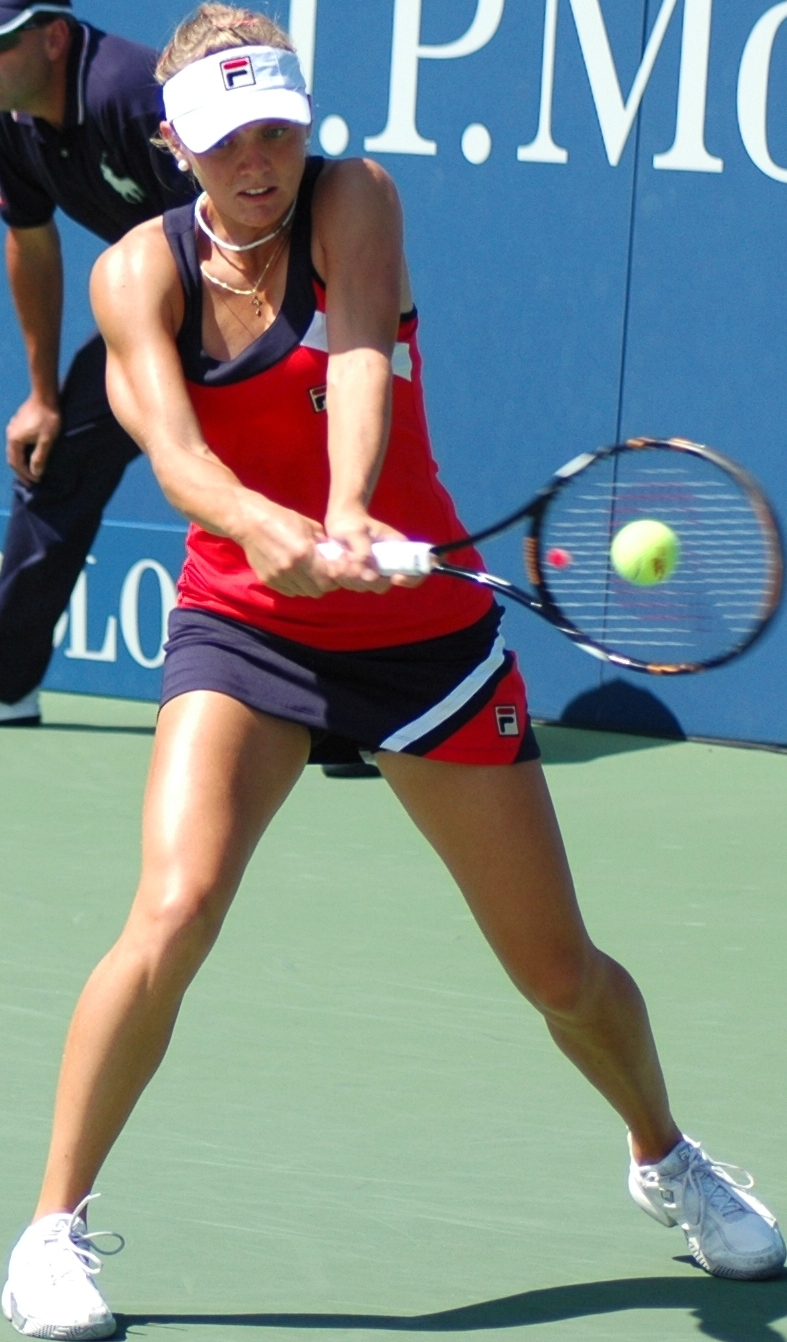
Chakvetadze hitting a backhand

Chakvetadze was a baseline player, whose game depended upon her excellent defensive skills. Her greatest assets were her speed, court coverage, shot selection, anticipation, and footwork. Her forehand and backhand were both hit flat and with depth, although she could hit her backhand with slice as and when the situation required. She was an excellent counterpuncher, with her exemplary fitness allowing her to extend rallies until she could create an opportunity to hit a winner. Her best groundstroke shots were her forehand and backhand, both down the line. Her first serve averaged 96 mph (154 km/h), and peaked at 109 mph (175 km/h), allowing her to serve aces and dictate service points. Her second serve was reliable, averaging 81 mph (130 km/h), meaning that double faults were uncommon; she was also excellent at defending her second serve with her powerful groundstrokes. Due to her doubles experience, she was a capable volleyer, and was adept at the net, but chose to play mostly from the baseline. Chakvetadze's major weaknesses were her lack of confidence and nerves. In difficult moments, she would commit many uncharacteristic unforced errors. Due to the careful nature of her game and her excellent point construction and shot selection, she was frequently compared to Martina Hingis.

== Personal life ==
=== Home invasion and robbery ===
On 18 December 2007, Chakvetadze's home was robbed. She was tied by six invaders who also beat her father, Djambuli. The six men left with over $306,000 worth of goods and cash. Chakvetadze was the target of the robbery, as the men demanded a Rolex watch she had recently won in an exhibition and told her as they left, "Keep playing, we'll come again." Seven suspects were arrested three months later.

=== Political career ===
In December 2011, Anna stood for election in the Russian State Duma with the Right Cause party, but was not elected.

== Performance timelines ==
Key
W	F	SF	QF	#R	RR	Q#	P#	DNQ	A	Z#	PO	G	S	B	NMS	NTI	P	NH

(W) winner; (F) finalist; (SF) semifinalist; (QF) quarterfinalist; (#R) rounds 4, 3, 2, 1; (RR) round-robin stage; (Q#) qualification round; (P#) preliminary round; (DNQ) did not qualify; (A) absent; (Z#) Davis/Fed Cup Zonal Group (with number indication) or (PO) play-off; (G) gold, (S) silver or (B) bronze Olympic/Paralympic medal; (NMS) not a Masters tournament; (NTI) not a Tier I tournament; (P) postponed; (NH) not held; (SR) strike rate (events won / competed); (W–L) win–loss record.
To avoid confusion and double counting, these charts are updated at the conclusion of a tournament or when the player's participation has ended.

=== Singles ===
Tournament	2003	2004	2005	2006	2007	2008	2009	2010	2011	2012	SR	W–L	Win%
Grand Slam tournaments
Australian Open	A	A	2R	2R	QF	3R	2R	1R	2R	1R	0 / 8	10–8	56%
French Open	A	A	3R	2R	QF	2R	1R	1R	A	A	0 / 6	8–6	57%
Wimbledon	A	A	1R	3R	3R	4R	1R	2R	1R	A	0 / 7	8–7	53%
US Open	A	3R	3R	4R	SF	1R	2R	1R	A	A	0 / 7	13–7	65%
Win–loss	0–0	2–1	5–4	7–4	15–4	6–4	2–4	1–4	1–2	0–1	0 / 28	39–28	58%
Year-end championships
WTA Tour Championships	DNQ				SF	DNQ					0 / 1	2–2	50%
Premier Mandatory & Premier 5 + former
Dubai Championships	NMS						1R	A	2R	NP5	0 / 2	1–2	33%
Indian Wells Open	A	A	3R	4R	4R	A	3R	2R	2R	A	0 / 6	9–6	60%
Miami Open	A	A	1R	4R	SF	3R	3R	1R	A	A	0 / 6	9–6	60%
Madrid Open	NH						3R	A	A	Q2	0 / 1	2–1	67%
Italian Open	A	A	2R	1R	3R	SF	3R	A	A	1R	0 / 6	7–6	54%
Cincinnati Open	NMS/NH						2R	A	A	A	0 / 1	1–1	50%
Canadian Open	A	A	A	SF	2R	3R	1R	A	A	A	0 / 4	5–4	56%
Pan Pacific Open	A	A	A	A	A	1R	A	A	A	A	0 / 1	0–1	0%
China Open	NMS						A	Q2	A	A	0 / 0	0–0	–
Charleston Open	A	A	A	A	A	2R	NMS				0 / 1	0–1	0%
German Open	A	A	1R	3R	2R	1R	NH				0 / 4	3–4	43%
San Diego Open	NMS	A	QF	QF	SF	NMS/NH					0 / 3	9–3	75%
Kremlin Cup	Q2	1R	1R	W	1R	1R	NMS				1 / 5	4–4	50%
Zurich Open	A	A	1R	A	A	NMS/NH					0 / 1	0–1	0%
Career statistics
Tournaments	0	3	21	22	22	24	18	16	8	8	Career total: 142		
Titles	0	0	0	2	4	1	0	1	0	0	Career total: 8		
Finals	0	0	0	2	4	2	0	1	0	0	Career total: 9		
Overall win-loss	0–0	2–3	24–21	37–20	59–20	27–23	15–19	18–15	3–8	3–8	8 / 142	188–137	58%
Year-end ranking	374	84	33	13	6	18	70	56	230	222	$3,909,756		

== Significant finals ==
=== Premier Mandatory & Premier 5 finals ===
==== Singles: 1 (title) ====
Result	Year	Tournament	Surface	Opponent	Score
Win	2006	Kremlin Cup, Russia	Hard (i)	(Russia) Nadia Petrova	6–4, 6–4

==== Doubles: 1 (runner-up) ====
Result	Year	Tournament	Surface	Partner	Opponents	Score
Loss	2007	San Diego Classic, US	Hard	(Belarus) Victoria Azarenka	(Zimbabwe) Cara Black (United States) Liezel Huber	5–7, 4–6

== WTA Tour finals ==
=== Singles: 9 (8 titles, 1 runner-up) ===
Legend Grand Slam Tier I / Premier M & 5 (1–0) Tier II / Premier (2–1) Tiers III & IV / International (5–0)	Finals by surface Hard (6–1) Grass (1–0) Carpet (1–0)	Finals by setting Outdoor (7–1) Indoor (1–0)

Result	W–L	Date	Tournament	Tier	Surface	Opponent	Score
Win	1–0	Sep 2006	Guangzhou Open, China	Tier III (Note: Includes WTA Premier and WTA International tournaments. The WTA Tier II tournaments were reclassified as WTA Premier tournaments in 2009, while the WTA Tier III tournaments, WTA Tier IV tournaments and WTA Tier V tournaments were reclassified as WTA International tournaments the same year .)	Hard	(Spain) Anabel Medina Garrigues	6–3, 6–4
Win	2–0	Oct 2006	Kremlin Cup, Russia	Tier I (Note: The WTA Tier I tournaments were reclassified as WTA Premier tournaments in 2009.)	Carpet (i)	(Russia) Nadia Petrova	6–4, 6–4
Win	3–0	Jan 2007	Hobart International, Australia	Tier IV	Hard	(Russia) Vasilisa Bardina	6–3, 7–6^{(7–3)}
Win	4–0	Jun 2007	Rosmalen Open, Netherlands	Tier III	Grass	(Serbia) Jelena Janković	7–6^{(7–2)}, 3–6, 6–3
Win	5–0	Jul 2007	Cincinnati Open, United States	Tier III	Hard	(Japan) Akiko Morigami	6–1, 6–3
Win	6–0	Jul 2007	Stanford Classic, United States	Tier II	Hard	(India) Sania Mirza	6–3, 6–2
Win	7–0	Feb 2008	Open GDF Suez, France	Tier II	Hard (i)	(Hungary) Ágnes Szávay	6–3, 2–6, 6–2
Loss	7–1	Aug 2008	Connecticut Open, United States	Tier II	Hard	(Denmark) Caroline Wozniacki	6–3, 4–6, 1–6
Win	8–1	Jul 2010	Slovenia Open	International	Hard	(Sweden) Johanna Larsson	6–1, 6–2

=== Doubles: 6 (6 runner-ups) ===
Legend Grand Slam Tier I / Premier M & 5 (0–1) Tier II / Premier (0–2) Tiers III & IV / International (0–3)	Finals by surface Hard (0–6)	Finals by setting Outdoor (0–6)

Result	W–L	Date	Tournament	Tier	Surface	Partner	Opponents	Score
Loss	0–1	Sep 2006	China Open	Tier II	Hard	(Russia) Elena Vesnina	(Spain) Virginia Ruano Pascual (Argentina) Paola Suárez	2–6, 4–6
Loss	0–2	Jul 2007	Stanford Classic, United States	Tier II	Hard	(Belarus) Victoria Azarenka	(India) Sania Mirza (Israel) Shahar Pe'er	4–6, 6–7^{(5–7)}
Loss	0–3	Aug 2007	San Diego Open, United States	Tier I	Hard	(Belarus) Victoria Azarenka	(Zimbabwe) Cara Black (United States) Liezel Huber	5–7, 4–6
Loss	0–4	Feb 2010	Pattaya Open, Thailand	International	Hard	(Russia) Ksenia Pervak	(New Zealand) Marina Erakovic (Thailand) Tamarine Tanasugarn	5–7, 1–6
Loss	0–5	Jul 2010	Slovenia Open, Slovenia	International	Hard	(New Zealand) Marina Erakovic	(Russia) Maria Kondratieva (Czech Republic) Vladimíra Uhlířová	4–6, 6–2, [7–10]
Loss	0–6	Sep 2012	Tashkent Open, Uzbekistan	International	Hard	(Serbia) Vesna Dolonc	(Poland) Paula Kania (Belarus) Polina Pekhova	2–6, ret.

== ITF Circuit finals ==
Legend
$100,000 tournaments
$50,000 tournaments
$25,000 tournaments
$10,000 tournaments

=== Singles: 6 (2 titles, 4 runner-ups) ===
Result	W–L	Date	Tournament	Tier	Surface	Opponent	Score
Loss	0–1	Feb 2004	ITF Sunderland, UK	25,000	Hard (i)	(Estonia) Kaia Kanepi	6–7^{(5)}, 0–6
Win	1–1	Feb 2004	ITF Redbridge, UK	25,000	Hard (i)	(France) Virginie Pichet	6–2, 6–2
Loss	1–2	Jun 2004	Surbiton Trophy, UK	25,000	Grass	(Japan) Akiko Morigami	4–6, 6–1, 1–6
Loss	1–3	Sep 2004	Batumi Ladies Open, Georgia	50,000	Hard	(Serbia) Ana Ivanovic	3–6, 3–6
Win	2–3	Aug 2010	Bronx Open, US	100,000	Hard (i)	(Sweden) Sofia Arvidsson	4–6, 6–2, 6–2
Loss	2–4	Aug 2012	Bronx Open, US	50,000	Hard	(Switzerland) Romina Oprandi	7–5, 3–6, 3–6

=== Doubles: 1 (title) ===
Result	Date	Tournament	Tier	Surface	Partner	Opponents	Score
Win	Jul 2002	ITF İstanbul, Turkey	10,000	Clay	(Russia) Irina Kotkina	(Serbia and Montenegro) Daniela Berček (Serbia and Montenegro) Ana Četnik	7–5, 6–4

== Best Grand Slam results details ==
=== Singles ===
	Australian Open			
2007 Australian Open (12th seed)
Round	Opponent	Rank	Score	ACR
1R	(Austria) Sybille Bammer	No. 42	6–4, 7–5	No. 13
2R	(United States) Laura Granville	No. 72	6–2, 5–7, 6–1	No. 13
3R	(Croatia) Jelena Kostanić Tošić	No. 67	6–4, 6–4	No. 13
4R	(Switzerland) Patty Schnyder (8)	No. 9	6–4, 6–1	No. 13
QF	(Russia) Maria Sharapova (1)	No. 1	6–7^{(5–7)}, 5–7	No. 13

	French Open			
2007 French Open (9th seed)
Round	Opponent	Rank	Score	ACR
1R	(Australia) Alicia Molik	No. 58	6–2, 6–3	No. 9
2R	(Hungary) Ágnes Szávay (Q)	No. 102	6–4, 6–7^{(1–7)}, 6–4	No. 9
3R	(Japan) Ai Sugiyama (21)	No. 26	6–4, 6–4	No. 9
4R	(Czech Republic) Lucie Šafářová (25)	No. 29	6–4, 0–6, 6–2	No. 9
QF	(Russia) Maria Sharapova (2)	No. 2	3–6, 4–6	No. 9

	Wimbledon Championships			
2008 Wimbledon (8th seed)
Round	Opponent	Rank	Score	ACR
1R	(Canada) Stéphanie Dubois	No. 100	2–6, 6–1, 8–6	No. 8
2R	(Romania) Edina Gallovits	No. 84	6–4, 6–2	No. 8
3R	(Russia) Evgeniya Rodina	No. 108	6–4, 6–3	No. 8
4R	(Czech Republic) Nicole Vaidišová (18)	No. 22	6–4, 6–7^{(0–7)}, 3–6	No. 8

	US Open			
2007 US Open (6th seed)
Round	Opponent	Rank	Score	ACR
1R	(United States) Ashley Weinhold (WC)	No. 413	6–1, 6–1	No. 6
2R	(Australia) Nicole Pratt	No. 68	6–3, 6–4	No. 6
3R	(India) Sania Mirza (26)	No. 27	6–2, 6–3	No. 6
4R	(Austria) Tamira Paszek	No. 43	6–1, 7–5	No. 6
QF	(Israel) Shahar Pe'er (18)	No. 19	6–4, 6–1	No. 6
SF	(Russia) Svetlana Kuznetsova (4)	No. 4	6–3, 1–6, 1–6	No. 6

== Head-to-head record ==
Chakvetadze's win–loss record against certain players who have been ranked world No. 10 or higher is as follows. Active players are in boldface:

**Player**	**Record**	**Win%**	**Hard**	**Clay**	**Grass**	**Carpet**	**Last match**
**Number 1 ranked players**							
(Switzerland) Martina Hingis	0–1	0%	0–1	0–0	0–0	0–0	
(United States) Lindsay Davenport	0–2	0%	0–2	0–0	0–0	0–0	
(United States) Venus Williams	1–3	25%	1–1	0–2	0–0	0–0	
(United States) Serena Williams	1–1	50%	1–0	0–0	0–1	0–0	
(Belgium) Kim Clijsters	0–1	0%	0–1	0–0	0–0	0–0	
(Belgium) Justine Henin	0–3	0%	0–2	0–0	0–1	0–0	
(France) Amélie Mauresmo	2–3	40%	1–0	0–1	0–0	1–2	
(Russia) Maria Sharapova	0–7	0%	0–4	0–2	0–1	0–0	
(Serbia and Montenegro) / (Serbia) Ana Ivanovic	2–3	40%	1–2	1–1	0–0	0–0	
(Serbia and Montenegro) / (Serbia) Jelena Janković	7–3	70%	4–1	1–1	2–1	0–0	
(Russia) Dinara Safina	2–3	40%	1–0	0–0	0–0	1–3	
(Denmark) Caroline Wozniacki	0–4	0%	0–4	0–0	0–0	0–0	
(Belarus) Victoria Azarenka	2–3	40%	1–2	0–1	1–0	0–0	
(Germany) Angelique Kerber	3–1	75%	0–0	0–1	3–0	0–0	
Number 2 ranked players							
(Russia) Anastasia Myskina	1–1	50%	1–1	0–0	0–0	0–0	
(Russia) Svetlana Kuznetsova	0–3	0%	0–1	0–1	0–1	0–0	
(Czech Republic) Petra Kvitová	0–1	0%	0–1	0–0	0–0	0–0	
(Russia) Vera Zvonareva	0–3	0%	0–1	0–0	0–2	0–0	
(Poland) Agnieszka Radwańska	2–2	50%	1–2	0–1	0–0	0–0	
Number 3 ranked players							
(Russia) Nadia Petrova	5–0	100%	3–0	0–0	0–0	2–0	
(Russia) Elena Dementieva	1–2	33%	0–2	0–0	0–0	1–0	
(United States) Sloane Stephens	0–1	0%	0–0	0–1	0–0	0–0	
Number 4 ranked players							
(Japan) Kimiko Date-Krumm	0–2	0%	0–2	0–0	0–0	0–0	
(Serbia and Montenegro) / (Australia) Jelena Dokić	0–1	0%	0–1	0–0	0–0	0–0	
(Italy) Francesca Schiavone	4–1	80%	2–1	0–0	1–0	1–0	
(Australia) Samantha Stosur	1–2	67%	0–1	2–0	0–0	0–0	
(China) Li Na	3–2	60%	3–1	0–1	0–0	0–0	
Number 5 ranked players							
(Slovakia) Dominika Cibulková	0–2	0%	0–1	0–1	0–0	0–0	
(Slovakia) Daniela Hantuchová	5–2	71%	3–1	1–1	1–0	0–0	
(Czech Republic) Lucie Šafářová	2–1	67%	1–0	1–1	0–0	0–0	
(Italy) Sara Errani	1–1	50%	1–1	0–0	0–0	0–0	
Number 6 ranked players							
(Spain) Carla Suárez Navarro	0–1	0%	0–1	0–0	0–0	0–0	
(Italy) Flavia Pennetta	0–4	0%	0–1	0–3	0–0	0–0	
Number 7 ranked players							
(Switzerland) Patty Schnyder	1–2	33%	1–1	0–0	0–0	0–1	
(France) Marion Bartoli	1–4	20%	0–3	0–0	0–1	1–0	
Number 8 ranked players							
(Japan) Ai Sugiyama	2–0	100%	1–0	1–0	0–0	0–0	
(Russia) Ekaterina Makarova	4–1	80%	4–1	0–0	0–0	0–0	
Number 9 ranked players							
(Germany) Andrea Petković	3–0	100%	1–0	0–0	2–0	0–0	
Number 10 ranked players							
(Russia) Maria Kirilenko	3–4	43%	3–4	0–0	0–0	0–0	
**Total**	**59–81**	**42%**	**35–48 (42%)**	**7–19 (27%)**	**10–8 (56%)**	**7–6 (53%)**	
