= WTA Slovenia Open =

Slovenia Open

Defunct tennis tournament
- Founded: 2005
- Abolished: 2022
- Editions: 7
- Location: Portorož; Slovenia
- Category: Tier IV (2005–2008); WTA International (2009–2010); WTA 250 (2021–present)
- Surface: Hard / outdoor
- Draw: 32M / 24Q / 16D
- Prize money: $235,238
- Website: Slovenia Open

Current champions (2022)
- Women's singles: (Czech Republic) Kateřina Siniaková
- Women's doubles: (Ukraine) Marta Kostyuk (Czech Republic) Tereza Martincová

The Slovenia Open was a women's tennis tournament held in Portorož, Slovenia, originally from 2005 until 2010, and returned to the tour in 2021 and 2022. The WTA Tour event was a WTA International category, and then transitioned to its most recent variant, the WTA 250 category. It was played on outdoor hardcourts.

Katarina Srebotnik finished runner-up in the singles finals of 2005 and 2007, and in the doubles final in 2005.

== Past finals ==
=== Singles ===
Year	Champions	Runners-up	Score
↓ Tier IV ↓
2005	(Czech Republic) Klára Koukalová	(Slovenia) Katarina Srebotnik	6–2, 4–6, 6–3
2006	(Austria) Tamira Paszek	(Italy) Maria Elena Camerin	7–5, 6–1
2007	(France) Tatiana Golovin	(Slovenia) Katarina Srebotnik	2–6, 6–4, 6–4
2008	(Italy) Sara Errani	(Spain) Anabel Medina Garrigues	6–3, 6–3
↓ WTA International ↓
2009	(Russia) Dinara Safina	(Italy) Sara Errani	6–7^{(5–7)}, 6–1, 7–5
2010	(Russia) Anna Chakvetadze	(Sweden) Johanna Larsson	6–1, 6–2
2011–20	Not held		
↓ WTA 250 tournament ↓
2021	(Italy) Jasmine Paolini	(United States) Alison Riske	7–6^{(7–4)}, 6–2
2022	(Czech Republic) Kateřina Siniaková	(Kazakhstan) Elena Rybakina	6–7^{(4–7)}, 7–6^{(7–5)}, 6–4

=== Doubles ===
Year	Champions	Runners-up	Score
↓ Tier IV ↓
2005	(Spain) Anabel Medina Garrigues (Italy) Roberta Vinci	(Croatia) Jelena Kostanić (Slovenia) Katarina Srebotnik	6–4, 5–7, 6–2
2006	(Czech Republic) Lucie Hradecká (Czech Republic) Renata Voráčová	(Czech Republic) Eva Birnerová (France) Émilie Loit	w/o
2007	(Czech Republic) Lucie Hradecká (2) (Czech Republic) Renata Voráčová (2)	(Slovenia) Andreja Klepač (Russia) Elena Likhovtseva	5–7, 6–4, [10–7]
2008	(Spain) Anabel Medina Garrigues(2) (Spain) Virginia Ruano Pascual	(Russia) Vera Dushevina (Russia) Ekaterina Makarova	6–4, 6–1
↓ WTA International ↓
2009	(Germany) Julia Görges (Czech Republic) Vladimíra Uhlířová	(France) Camille Pin (Czech Republic) Klára Zakopalová	6–4, 6–2
2010	(Russia) Maria Kondratieva (Czech Republic) Vladimíra Uhlířová (2)	(Russia) Anna Chakvetadze (New Zealand) Marina Erakovic	6–4, 2–6, [10–7]
2011–20	Not held		
↓ WTA 250 tournament ↓
2021	(Russia) Anna Kalinskaya (Slovakia) Tereza Mihalíková	(Serbia) Aleksandra Krunić (Netherlands) Lesley Pattinama Kerkhove	4–6, 6–2, [12–10]
2022	(Ukraine) Marta Kostyuk (Czech Republic) Tereza Martincová	(Spain) Cristina Bucșa (Slovakia) Tereza Mihalíková	6–4, 6–0
