= Camille Pin =

French tennis player

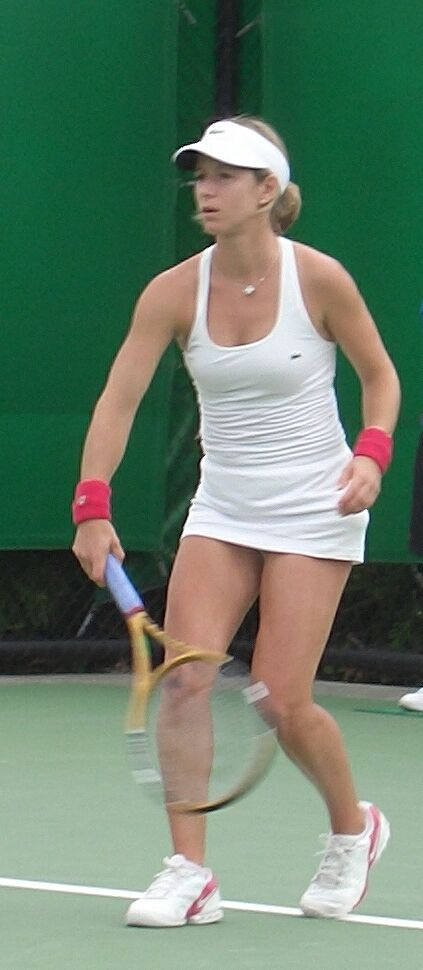
- Country (sports): France
- Born: 25 August 1981 (age 44) Nice, France
- Height: 1.62 m (5 ft 4 in)
- Turned pro: 1999
- Retired: 2010
- Plays: Right (two-handed backhand)
- Prize money: $980,663

Singles
- Career record: 345–321
- Career titles: 8 ITF
- Highest ranking: No. 61 (8 January 2007)

Grand Slam singles results
- Australian Open: 2R (2004, 2006, 2008)
- French Open: 1R (2001–2009)
- Wimbledon: 1R (2006, 2007, 2008)
- US Open: 2R (2007)

Doubles
- Career record: 81–126
- Career titles: 2 ITF
- Highest ranking: No. 81 (27 July 2009)

Camille Pin (born 25 August 1981) is a French former professional tennis player.

Her 2006 season was rather successful, for a player ranked lower than the top 100 in the WTA Tour. After a second-round loss to Serena Williams in the Australian Open, she made three ITF Circuit event finals, taking one of the titles at Lexington, Kentucky. She also made some reasonable showings at official WTA Tour events, especially qualifying for the Tier-I event at Indian Wells and making the second round. However, her 2006 Grand Slam second-round showing at the Australian Open would prove to be her best Grand Slam performance of the year, falling in the first round of every other major to tough opponents.

Pin made headlines at the 2007 Australian Open, after playing top seed Maria Sharapova in the first round and coming within two points of winning the match. After recovering from a 0–5 and 0–30 deficit in the final set, Pin eventually lost with a final score of 3–6, 6–4, 7–9.

Pin dated male professional tennis player Arnaud Clément of France.

On 28 May 2010, she announced her retirement from professional tennis.

== WTA career finals ==
=== Doubles: 1 (runner-up) ===
Legend
Premier Mandatory
Premier 5
Premier
International (0–1)

Result	Date	Tournament	Surface	Partner	Opponents	Score
Loss	25 July 2009	Portorož Open, Slovenia	Hard	(Czech Republic) Klára Koukalová	(Germany) Julia Görges (Czech Republic) Vladimíra Uhlířová	4–6, 2–6

== ITF Circuit finals ==
$100,000 tournaments
$75,000 tournaments
$50,000 tournaments
$25,000 tournaments
$10,000 tournaments

=== Singles (8–7) ===
Result	No.	Date	Tournament	Surface	Opponent	Score
Loss	1.	14 February 2000	ITF Faro, Portugal	Hard	(Slovakia) Zuzana Váleková	4–6, 3–6
Win	2.	27 February 2000	ITF Vilamoura, Portugal	Hard	(Russia) Marina Samoilenko	6–0, 6–2
Loss	3.	7 May 2000	ITF Hatfield, United Kingdom	Clay	(Serbia) Dragana Zarić	6–7^{(4)}, 4–6
Loss	4.	19 May 2001	ITF La Cañada, United States	Hard	(Australia) Cindy Watson	1–6, 3–6
Win	5.	20 October 2002	Open de Touraine, France	Hard (i)	(Italy) Mara Santangelo	2–6, 6–3, 6–0
Win	6.	27 October 2002	Open Saint-Raphaël, France	Hard (i)	(France) Séverine Beltrame	6–4, 7–5
Win	7.	26 October 2003	Open Saint-Raphaël, France	Hard (i)	(Estonia) Maret Ani	6–2, 6–2
Loss	8.	17 November 2003	ITF Deauville, France	Clay (i)	(Czech Republic) Eva Birnerová	4–6, 3–6
Win	9.	1 August 2004	Lexington Challenger, United States	Hard	(South Korea) Jeon Mi-ra	7–5, 6–3
Win	10.	10 April 2005	ITF College Park, United States	Hard	(United States) Ashley Harkleroad	2–6, 6–2, 6–3
Loss	11.	21 August 2005	Bronx Open, United States	Hard	(Austria) Sybille Bammer	6–3, 4–6, 4–6
Loss	12.	3 July 2006	ITF College Park, United States	Hard	(United States) Varvara Lepchenko	3–6, 5–7
Win	13.	30 July 2006	Lexington Challenger, United States	Hard	(United States) Abigail Spears	7–5, 7–5
Loss	14.	1 August 2006	ITF Washington, United States	Hard	(Israel) Tzipora Obziler	5–7, 5–2 ret.
Win	15.	9 March 2008	Las Vegas Open, United States	Hard	(United States) Asia Muhammad	6–4, 6–1

=== Doubles (2–1) ===
Result	No.	Date	Tournament	Surface	Partner	Opponents	Score
Win	1.	26 January 1998	ITF Dinan, France	Clay (i)	(France) Aurélie Védy	(Italy) Tathiana Garbin (Romania) Oana Elena Golimbioschi	w/o
Win	2.	7 September 1998	ITF Zadar, Croatia	Clay	(Croatia) Ivana Višić	(Czech Republic) Libuše Průšová (Poland) Anna Bieleń-Żarska	7–6^{(3)}, 7–6^{(4)}
Loss	3.	26 October 2003	Open Saint-Raphaël, France	Hard (i)	(Estonia) Maret Ani	(Bosnia and Herzegovina) Mervana Jugić-Salkić (Croatia) Darija Jurak	2–6, 1–6

== Grand Slam singles performance timeline ==
Key
W	F	SF	QF	#R	RR	Q#	DNQ	A	NH

(W) winner; (F) finalist; (SF) semifinalist; (QF) quarterfinalist; (#R) rounds 4, 3, 2, 1; (RR) round-robin stage; (Q#) qualification round; (DNQ) did not qualify; (A) absent; (NH) not held; (SR) strike rate (events won / competed); (W–L) win–loss record.

Tournament	2001	2002	2003	2004	2005	2006	2007	2008	2009	2010
Australian Open	LQ	LQ	1R	2R	1R	2R	1R	2R	1R	Q1
French Open	1R	1R	1R	1R	1R	1R	1R	1R	1R	
Wimbledon	LQ	LQ	LQ	LQ	LQ	1R	1R	1R	LQ	
US Open	LQ	LQ	LQ	1R	1R	1R	2R	1R	1R	
