= Justine Henin career statistics =

Career finals
Discipline	Type	Won	Lost	Total
Singles	Grand Slam	7	5	12
Singles	WTA Finals (Note: Formerly known as: Virginia Slims Championships (until 1995); WTA Tour Championships (until 2014))	2	0	2
Singles	WTA 1000 (Note: Formerly known as: Category 4 & 5 & 6 (until 1990); Tier I (until 2009); WTA Premier Mandatory and 5 (until 2021))	10	4	14
Singles	WTA 500 (Note: Formerly known as: Category 3 (until 1990); Tier II (until 2009); WTA Premier (until 2021))	18	5	23
Singles	WTA 250 (Note: Formerly known as: Category 1 & 2 (until 1990); Tier III & IV & V (until 2009); WTA International (until 2021))	5	4	9
Singles	Olympics	1	0	1
Singles	Total	43	18	61
Doubles	Grand Slam	–	–	–
Doubles	WTA Finals	–	–	–
Doubles	WTA 1000	1	0	1
Doubles	WTA 500	0	1	1
Doubles	WTA 250	1	0	1
Doubles	Olympics	–	–	–
Doubles	Total	2	1	3

This is a list of the main career statistics of professional Belgian tennis player Justine Henin.

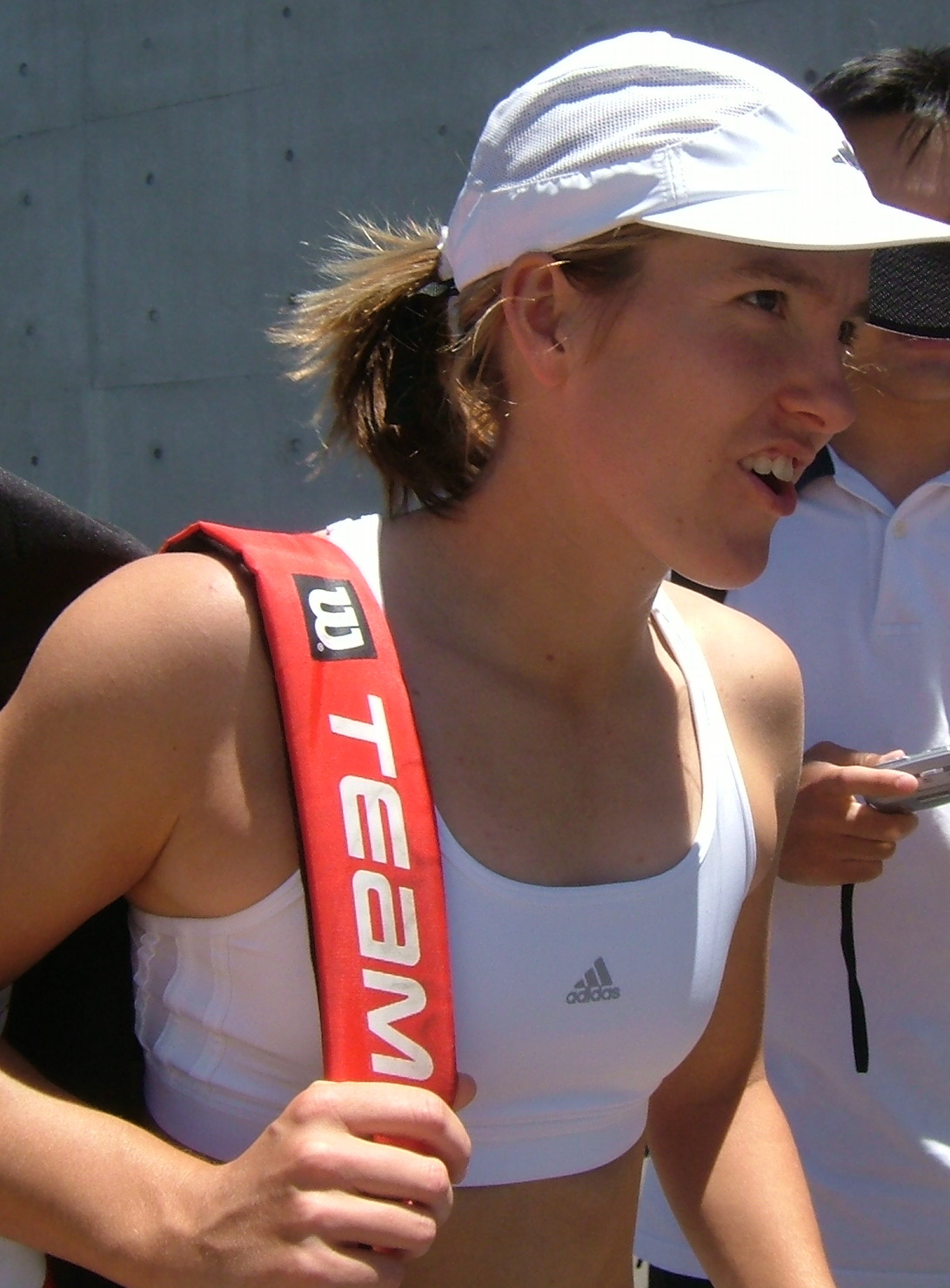
Henin in 2005

== Performance timelines ==
Key
W	F	SF	QF	#R	RR	Q#	P#	DNQ	A	Z#	PO	G	S	B	NMS	NTI	P	NH

(W) winner; (F) finalist; (SF) semifinalist; (QF) quarterfinalist; (#R) rounds 4, 3, 2, 1; (RR) round-robin stage; (Q#) qualification round; (P#) preliminary round; (DNQ) did not qualify; (A) absent; (Z#) Davis/Fed Cup Zonal Group (with number indication) or (PO) play-off; (G) gold, (S) silver or (B) bronze Olympic/Paralympic medal; (NMS) not a Masters tournament; (NTI) not a Tier I tournament; (P) postponed; (NH) not held; (SR) strike rate (events won / competed); (W–L) win–loss record.

=== Singles ===
Tournament	1999	2000	2001	2002	2003	2004	2005	2006	2007	2008	2009	2010	2011	SR	W–L	Win%
Grand Slam tournaments
Australian Open	A	2R	4R	QF	SF	W	A	F	A	QF	A	F	3R	1 / 9	38–8	83%
French Open	2R	A	SF	1R	W	2R	W	W	W	A	A	4R	A	4 / 9	38–5	88%
Wimbledon	A	1R	F	SF	SF	A	1R	F	SF	A	A	4R	A	0 / 8	30–8	79%
US Open	1R	4R	4R	4R	W	4R	4R	F	W	A	A	A	A	2 / 9	35–7	83%
Win–loss	1–2	4–3	17–4	12–4	24–2	11–2	10–2	25–3	19–1	4–1	0–0	12–3	2–1	7 / 35	141–28	83%
National representation
Summer Olympics	NH	A	not held			G	not held			A	not held			1 / 1	6–0	100%
Year-end championship
WTA Finals	DNQ		QF	QF	SF	A	A	W	W	DNQ		A/Alt	DNQ	2 / 5	13–5	72%
WTA 1000 + former^{†} tournaments
Indian Wells Open	A	A	3R	4R	A	W	A	SF	A	A	A	2R	A	1 / 5	14–4	78%
Miami Open	A	A	3R	2R	QF	A	QF	2R	F	QF	A	SF	A	0 / 8	20–8	71%
Berlin / Madrid Open^{1}	A	A	SF	W	W	A	W	F	SF	3R	A	1R	A	3 / 8	28–5	85%
Italian Open	A	A	A	F	A	A	A	A	A	A	A	A	A	0 / 1	4–1	80%
Canadian Open	A	2R	QF	QF	W	A	F	A	W	A	A	A	A	2 / 6	19–4	83%
Charleston Open^{2}	A	A	A	A	W	A	W	SF	A	A	Premier			2 / 3	14–1	93%
Kremlin Cup^{2}	A	A	2R	A	A	A	A	A	A	A	Premier			0 / 1	0–1	0%
Zurich Open^{2}	A	A	A	SF	W	A	A	A	W	T II	not held			2 / 3	10–1	91%
Win–loss	0–0	1–1	8–5	15–5	22–1	6–0	19–2	11–4	17–2	4–2	0–0	6–3	0–0	10 / 35	109–25	81%
Career statistics
	1999	2000	2001	2002	2003	2004	2005	2006	2007	2008	2009	2010	2011	SR	W–L	Win%
Tournaments	7	13	21	23	18	9	9	13	14	6	0	9	1	Career total: 143		
Titles	1	0	3	2	8	5	4	6	10	2	0	2	0	Career total: 43		
Finals	1	0	6	6	11	5	5	10	11	2	0	4	0	Career total: 61		
Hardcourt win–loss	7–4	13–10	32–13	29–15	47–8	31–2	10–4	34–5	40–2	15–3	0–0	16–4	6–1	26 / 94	280–71	80%
Clay win–loss	6–2	3–2	18–4	16–4	20–1	4–2	24–0	16–2	14–1	1–1	0–0	8–3	0–0	13 / 34	130–22	86%
Grass win–loss	0–0	1–2	10–1	7–2	8–2	0–0	0–1	10–1	9–1	0–0	0–0	8–1	0–0	4 / 15	53–11	83%
Overall win–loss^{3}	13–6	17–14	60–18	52–21	75–11	35–4	34–5	60–8	63–4	16–4	0–0	32–8	6–1	43 / 143	463–104	82%
Win (%)	68%	55%	77%	71%	87%	90%	87%	88%	94%	80%	–	80%	86%	Career total: 82%		
Year-end ranking (Note: 1998: WTA ranking–226.)	69	48	7	5	1	8	6	1	1	–	–	12	–	$20,863,335		

=== Doubles ===
Tournament	2001	2002	2003	SR	W–L	Win%
Grand Slam tournaments
Australian Open	2R	A	3R^{4}	0 / 2	3–1	75%
French Open	SF	A	A	0 / 1	4–1	80%
Wimbledon	3R^{4}	A	A	0 / 1	2–0	100%
US Open	2R	2R	A	0 / 2	2–2	50%
Win–loss	8–3	1–1	2–0	0 / 6	11–5	69%
WTA 1000 tournaments + former
Indian Wells Open	A	1R	A	0 / 1	0–1	0%
Miami Open	A	QF	A	0 / 1	2–1	67%
Italian Open	A	2R^{4}	A	0 / 1	1–0	100%
Canadian Open	QF	1R	A	0 / 2	2–2	50%
Zurich Open^{2}	A	W	A	1 / 1	4–0	100%

Notes

- ^{1} In 2009, the WTA German Open was abolished and replaced by the Madrid Open.
- ^{2} The WTA 1000 category was previously known as Premier Mandatory & Premier 5 (until 2021), and before that as Tier I (until 2009). This note covers tournaments that have since been downgraded to a lower category or are no longer held.
- ^{3} Only main-draw results in WTA Tour, Grand Slam tournaments, Billie Jean King Cup (Fed Cup), United Cup, Hopman Cup and Olympic Games are included in win–loss records.
- ^{4} Withdraw during the tournament. Not counted as a loss.

== Grand Slam tournament finals ==
=== Singles: 12 (7 titles, 5 runner-ups) ===
Result	Year	Championship	Surface	Opponent	Score
Loss	2001	Wimbledon	Grass	(United States) Venus Williams	1–6, 6–3, 0–6
Win	2003	French Open (1)	Clay	(Belgium) Kim Clijsters	6–0, 6–4
Win	2003	US Open (1)	Hard	(Belgium) Kim Clijsters	7–5, 6–1
Win	2004	Australian Open (1)	Hard	(Belgium) Kim Clijsters	6–3, 4–6, 6–3
Win	2005	French Open (2)	Clay	(France) Mary Pierce	6–1, 6–1
Loss	2006	Australian Open	Hard	(France) Amélie Mauresmo	1–6, 0–2 ret.
Win	2006	French Open (3)	Clay	(Russia) Svetlana Kuznetsova	6–4, 6–4
Loss	2006	Wimbledon	Grass	(France) Amélie Mauresmo	6–2, 3–6, 4–6
Loss	2006	US Open	Hard	(Russia) Maria Sharapova	4–6, 4–6
Win	2007	French Open (4)	Clay	(Serbia) Ana Ivanovic	6–1, 6–2
Win	2007	US Open (2)	Hard	(Russia) Svetlana Kuznetsova	6–1, 6–3
Loss	2010	Australian Open	Hard	(United States) Serena Williams	4–6, 6–3, 2–6

== Other significant finals ==
=== Summer Olympics ===
==== Singles: 1 (gold medal) ====
Result	Year	Tournament	Surface	Opponent	Score
Gold	2004	Athens Olympics	Hard	(France) Amélie Mauresmo	6–3, 6–3

=== WTA Finals ===
==== Singles: 2 (titles) ====
Result	Year	Tournament	Surface	Opponent	Score
Win	2006	WTA Tour Championships, Spain	Hard (i)	(France) Amélie Mauresmo	6–4, 6–3
Win	2007	WTA Tour Championships, Spain (2)	Hard (i)	(Russia) Maria Sharapova	5–7, 7–5, 6–3

=== WTA 1000 tournaments ===
==== Singles: 14 (10 titles, 4 runner-ups) ====
Result	Year	Tournament	Surface	Opponent	Score
Win	2002	German Open	Clay	(United States) Serena Williams	6–2, 1–6, 7–6^{(7–5)}
Loss	2002	Italian Open	Clay	(United States) Serena Williams (2)	6–7^{(6–8)}, 4–6
Win	2003	Charleston Open	Clay	(United States) Serena Williams (3)	6–3, 6–4
Win	2003	German Open (2)	Clay	(Belgium) Kim Clijsters	6–4, 4–6, 7–5
Win	2003	Canadian Open	Hard	(Russia) Lina Krasnoroutskaya	6–1, 6–0
Win	2003	Zurich Open	Hard (i)	(Serbia and Montenegro) Jelena Dokić	6–0, 6–4
Win	2004	Indian Wells Open	Hard	(United States) Lindsay Davenport	6–1, 6–4
Win	2005	Charleston Open (2)	Clay	(Russia) Elena Dementieva	7–5, 6–4
Win	2005	German Open (3)	Clay	(Russia) Nadia Petrova	6–3, 4–6, 6–3
Loss	2005	Canadian Open	Hard	(Belgium) Kim Clijsters (2)	5–7, 1–6
Loss	2006	German Open	Clay	(Russia) Nadia Petrova (2)	6–4, 4–6, 5–7
Loss	2007	Miami Open	Hard	(United States) Serena Williams (4)	6–0, 5–7, 3–6
Win	2007	Canadian Open (2)	Hard	(Serbia) Jelena Janković	7–6^{(7–3)}, 7–5
Win	2007	Zurich Open (2)	Hard (i)	(France) Tatiana Golovin	6–4, 6–4

==== Doubles: 1 (1 title) ====
Result	Year	Tournament	Surface	Partner	Opponents	Score
Win	2002	Zurich Open	Hard (i)	(Russia) Elena Bovina	(Serbia and Montenegro) Jelena Dokić (Russia) Nadia Petrova	6–2, 7–6^{(7–2)}

== WTA Tour finals ==
=== Singles: 61 (43 titles, 18 runner-ups) ===
Legend Grand Slam (7–5) Year-end (Finals) (2–0) Olympics (1–0) WTA 1000 (Tier I) (10–4) WTA 500 (Tier II / Premier) (18–5) WTA 250 (Tier III / Tier IV / International) (5–4)	Finals by surface Hard (25–10) Grass (4–3) Clay (13–3) Carpet (1–2)

Result	W–L	Date	Tournament	Tier	Surface	Opponent	Score
Win	1–0	May 1999	Belgian Open, Belgium	Tier IV	Clay	(France) Sarah Pitkowski	6–1, 6–2
Win	2–0	Jan 2001	Brisbane International, Australia	Tier III	Hard	(Italy) Silvia Farina Elia	7–6^{(7–5)}, 6–4
Win	3–0	Jan 2001	Canberra International, Australia	Tier III	Hard	(France) Sandrine Testud	6–2, 6–2
Win	4–0	Jun 2001	Rosmalen Championships, Netherlands	Tier III	Grass	(Belgium) Kim Clijsters	6–4, 3–6, 6–3
Loss	4–1	Jul 2001	Wimbledon, United Kingdom	Grand Slam	Grass	(United States) Venus Williams	1–6, 6–3, 0–6
Loss	4–2	Sep 2001	Waikoloa Championships, Hawaii	Tier IV	Hard	(France) Sandrine Testud (2)	3–6, 0–2 retired
Loss	4–3	Sep 2001	Stuttgart Open, Germany	Tier II	Hard (i)	(United States) Lindsay Davenport	5–7, 4–6
Loss	4–4	Jan 2002	Brisbane International, Australia	Tier III	Hard	(United States) Venus Williams (2)	5–7, 2–6
Loss	4–5	Feb 2002	Diamond Games, Belgium	Tier II	Carpet (i)	(United States) Venus Williams (3)	3–6, 7–5, 3–6
Loss	4–6	Apr 2002	Amelia Island Championships, United States	Tier II	Clay	(United States) Venus Williams (4)	6–2, 5–7, 6–7^{(5–7)}
Win	5–6	May 2002	German Open, Germany	Tier I	Clay	(United States) Serena Williams	6–2, 1–6, 7–6^{(7–5)}
Loss	5–7	May 2002	Italian Open, Italy	Tier I	Clay	(United States) Serena Williams (2)	6–7^{(6–8)}, 4–6
Win	6–7	Oct 2002	Linz Open, Austria	Tier II	Carpet (i)	(United States) Alexandra Stevenson	6–3, 6–0
Win	7–7	Feb 2003	Dubai Championships, United Arab Emirates	Tier II	Hard	(United States) Monica Seles	4–6, 7–6^{(7–4)}, 7–5
Win	8–7	Apr 2003	Charleston Open, United States	Tier I	Clay	(United States) Serena Williams (3)	6–3, 6–4
Win	9–7	May 2003	German Open, Germany (2)	Tier I	Clay	(Belgium) Kim Clijsters (2)	6–4, 4–6, 7–5
Win	10–7	May 2003	French Open, France	Grand Slam	Clay	(Belgium) Kim Clijsters (3)	6–0, 6–4
Loss	10–8	Jun 2003	Rosmalen Championships, Netherlands	Tier III	Grass	(Belgium) Kim Clijsters (4)	7–6^{(7–4)}, 0–3 ret.
Win	11–8	Jul 2003	Southern California Open, United States	Tier II	Hard	(Belgium) Kim Clijsters (5)	3–6, 6–2, 6–3
Win	12–8	Aug 2003	Canadian Open, Canada	Tier I	Hard	(Russia) Lina Krasnoroutskaya	6–1, 6–0
Win	13–8	Aug 2003	US Open, United States	Grand Slam	Hard	(Belgium) Kim Clijsters (6)	7–5, 6–1
Loss	13–9	Sep 2003	Sparkassen Cup, Germany	Tier II	Carpet (i)	(Russia) Anastasia Myskina	6–3, 3–6, 3–6
Loss	13–10	Oct 2003	Stuttgart Open, Germany	Tier II	Hard (i)	(Belgium) Kim Clijsters (7)	7–5, 4–6, 2–6
Win	14–10	Oct 2003	Zurich Open, Switzerland	Tier I	Hard (i)	(Serbia and Montenegro) Jelena Dokić	6–0, 6–4
Win	15–10	Jan 2004	Sydney International, Australia	Tier II	Hard	(France) Amélie Mauresmo	6–4, 6–4
Win	16–10	Jan 2004	Australian Open, Australia	Grand Slam	Hard	(Belgium) Kim Clijsters (8)	6–3, 4–6, 6–3
Win	17–10	Feb 2004	Dubai Championships, United Arab Emirates (2)	Tier II	Hard	(Russia) Svetlana Kuznetsova	6–3, 7–6^{(7–3)}
Win	18–10	Mar 2004	Indian Wells Open, United States	Tier I	Hard	(United States) Lindsay Davenport (2)	6–1, 6–4
Win	19–10	Aug 2004	Summer Olympics, Greece	Olympics	Hard	(France) Amélie Mauresmo (2)	6–3, 6–3
Win	20–10	Apr 2005	Charleston Open, United States (2)	Tier I	Clay	(Russia) Elena Dementieva	7–5, 6–4
Win	21–10	May 2005	Warsaw Open, Poland	Tier II	Clay	(Russia) Svetlana Kuznetsova (2)	3–6, 6–2, 7–5
Win	22–10	May 2005	German Open, Germany (3)	Tier I	Clay	(Russia) Nadia Petrova	6–3, 4–6, 6–3
Win	23–10	Jun 2005	French Open, France (2)	Grand Slam	Clay	(France) Mary Pierce	6–1, 6–1
Loss	23–11	Aug 2005	Canadian Open, Canada	Tier I	Hard	(Belgium) Kim Clijsters (9)	5–7, 1–6
Win	24–11	Jan 2006	Sydney International, Australia (2)	Tier II	Hard	(Italy) Francesca Schiavone	4–6, 7–5, 7–5
Loss	24–12	Jan 2006	Australian Open, Australia	Grand Slam	Hard	(France) Amélie Mauresmo (3)	1–6, 0–2 retired
Win	25–12	Feb 2006	Dubai Championships, United Arab Emirates (3)	Tier II	Hard	(Russia) Maria Sharapova	7–5, 6–2
Loss	25–13	May 2006	German Open, Germany	Tier I	Clay	(Russia) Nadia Petrova (2)	6–4, 4–6, 5–7
Win	26–13	Jun 2006	French Open, France (3)	Grand Slam	Clay	(Russia) Svetlana Kuznetsova (3)	6–4, 6–4
Win	27–13	Jun 2006	Eastbourne International, United Kingdom	Tier II	Grass	(Russia) Anastasia Myskina (2)	4–6, 6–1, 7–6^{(7–5)}
Loss	27–14	Jul 2006	Wimbledon, United Kingdom	Grand Slam	Grass	(France) Amélie Mauresmo (4)	6–2, 3–6, 4–6
Win	28–14	Aug 2006	Connecticut Open, United States	Tier II	Hard	(United States) Lindsay Davenport (3)	6–0, 1–0 retired
Loss	28–15	Sep 2006	US Open, United States	Grand Slam	Hard	(Russia) Maria Sharapova (2)	4–6, 4–6
Win	29–15	Nov 2006	WTA Tour Championships, Spain	Finals	Hard (i)	(France) Amélie Mauresmo (5)	6–4, 6–3
Win	30–15	Feb 2007	Dubai Championships, United Arab Emirates (4)	Tier II	Hard	(France) Amélie Mauresmo (6)	6–4, 7–5
Win	31–15	Mar 2007	Qatar Open, Qatar	Tier II	Hard	(Russia) Svetlana Kuznetsova (4)	6–4, 6–2
Loss	31–16	Apr 2007	Miami Open, United States	Tier I	Hard	(United States) Serena Williams (4)	6–0, 5–7, 3–6
Win	32–16	May 2007	Warsaw Open, Poland (2)	Tier II	Clay	(Ukraine) Alona Bondarenko	6–1, 6–3
Win	33–16	Jun 2007	French Open, France (4)	Grand Slam	Clay	(Serbia) Ana Ivanovic	6–1, 6–2
Win	34–16	Jun 2007	Eastbourne International, United Kingdom (2)	Tier II	Grass	(France) Amélie Mauresmo (7)	7–5, 6–7^{(4–7)}, 7–6^{(7–2)}
Win	35–16	Aug 2007	Canadian Open, Canada (2)	Tier I	Hard	(Serbia) Jelena Janković	7–6^{(7–3)}, 7–5
Win	36–16	Sep 2007	US Open, United States (2)	Grand Slam	Hard	(Russia) Svetlana Kuznetsova (5)	6–1, 6–3
Win	37–16	Oct 2007	Stuttgart Open, Germany (3)	Tier II	Hard (i)	(France) Tatiana Golovin	2–6, 6–2, 6–1
Win	38–16	Oct 2007	Zurich Open, Switzerland (2)	Tier I	Hard (i)	(France) Tatiana Golovin (2)	6–4, 6–4
Win	39–16	Nov 2007	WTA Tour Championships, Spain (2)	Finals	Hard (i)	(Russia) Maria Sharapova (3)	5–7, 7–5, 6–3
Win	40–16	Jan 2008	Sydney International, Australia (3)	Tier II	Hard	(Russia) Svetlana Kuznetsova (6)	4–6, 6–2, 6–4
Win	41–16	Feb 2008	Diamond Games, Belgium	Tier II	Hard (i)	(Italy) Karin Knapp	6–3, 6–3
Loss	41–17	Jan 2010	Brisbane International, Australia	International	Hard	(Belgium) Kim Clijsters (10)	3–6, 6–4, 6–7^{(6–8)}
Loss	41–18	Jan 2010	Australian Open, Australia	Grand Slam	Hard	(United States) Serena Williams (5)	4–6, 6–3, 2–6
Win	42–18	May 2010	Stuttgart Open, Germany (2)	Premier	Clay (i)	(Australia) Samantha Stosur	6–4, 2–6, 6–1
Win	43–18	Jun 2010	Rosmalen Championships, Netherlands (2)	International	Grass	(Germany) Andrea Petkovic	3–6, 6–3, 6–4

=== Doubles: 3 (2 titles, 1 runner–up) ===
Legend WTA 1000 (Tier I) (1–0) WTA 500 (Tier II) (0–1) WTA 250 (Tier III) (1–0)	Finals by surface Hard (1–1) Carpet (1–0)

Result	W–L	Date	Tournament	Tier	Surface	Partner	Opponents	Score
Loss	0–1	Oct 2001	Stuttgart Open, Germany	Tier II	Hard (i)	(United States) Meghann Shaughnessy	(United States) Lindsay Davenport (United States) Lisa Raymond	4–6, 7–6^{(7–4)}, 5–7
Win	1–1	Jan 2002	Brisbane International, Australia	Tier III	Hard	(United States) Meghann Shaughnessy (2)	(Sweden) Åsa Svensson (Netherlands) Miriam Oremans	6–1, 7–6^{(8–6)}
Win	2–1	Oct 2002	Zurich Open, Switzerland	Tier I	Carpet (i)	(Russia) Elena Bovina	(Federal Republic of Yugoslavia) Jelena Dokic (Russia) Nadia Petrova	6–2, 7–6^{(7–2)}

== ITF Circuit finals ==
=== Singles: 7 (7 titles) ===
Legend
50K tournaments (1–0)
25K tournaments (3–0)
10K tournaments (3–0)

Result	W–L	Date	Tournament	Tier	Surface	Opponent	Score
Win	1–0	May 1997	ITF Le Touquet, France	10K	Clay	(Germany) Camilla Kremer	6–2, 6–3
Win	2–0	Aug 1997	ITF Koksijde, Belgium	10K	Clay	(Spain) Noelia Serra	6–3, 7–6^{(7–4)}
Win	3–0	Apr 1998	ITF Gelos, France	10K	Clay	(France) Aurélie Védy	6–0, 6–0
Win	4–0	May 1998	ITF Grenelefe, United States	25K	Hard	(United States) Jane Chi	6–2, 6–3
Win	5–0	Nov 1998	ITF Ramat Hasharon, Israel	25K	Hard	(Austria) Patricia Wartusch	6–2, 6–4
Win	6–0	Mar 1999	ITF Reims, France	25K	Clay	(Belgium) Kim Clijsters	6–4, 6–4
Win	7–0	Jul 2000	ITF Liège, Belgium	50K	Clay	(Germany) Barbara Rittner	6–0, 3–1 ret.

=== Doubles: 3 (2 titles, 1 runner–up) ===
Legend
75K tournaments (1–0)
25K tournaments (1–0)
10K tournaments (0–1)

Result	W–L	Date	Tournament	Tier	Surface	Partner	Opponents	Score
Loss	0–1	Apr 1998	ITF Gelos, France	10K	Clay	(France) Aurélie Védy	(Netherlands) Yvette Basting (France) Emmanuelle Curutchet	6–0, 6–7^{(6–8)}, 5–7
Win	1–1	Nov 1998	ITF Ramat Hasharon, Israel	25K	Hard	(Belgium) Kim Clijsters	(Belarus) Olga Glouschenko (Belarus) Tatiana Poutchek	6–2, 6–0
Win	2–1	Dec 2000	ITF Cergy, France	75K	Hard (i)	(France) Virginie Razzano	(Slovenia) Maja Matevžič (Germany) Caroline Schneider	6–2, 6–4

== Billie Jean King Cup ==
=== Finals: 3 (1 title, 2 runner-ups) ===
Result	W–L	Date	Tournament	Surface	Partners	Opponents	Score
Win	1–0	Nov 2001	Fed Cup, Spain	Clay	(Belgium) Kim Clijsters (Belgium) Els Callens (Belgium) Laurence Courtois	(Russia) Nadia Petrova (Russia) Elena Dementieva (Russia) Elena Likhovtseva (Russia) Elena Bovina	2–1
Loss	1–1	Sep 2006	Fed Cup, Belgium	Hard (i)	(Belgium) Kirsten Flipkens (Belgium) Caroline Maes (Belgium) Leslie Butkiewicz	(Italy) Francesca Schiavone (Italy) Flavia Pennetta (Italy) Mara Santangelo (Italy) Roberta Vinci	2–3
Loss	1–2	Jan 2011	Hopman Cup, Australia	Hard	(Belgium) Ruben Bemelmans	(United States) Bethanie Mattek-Sands (United States) John Isner	1–2

== WTA Tour career earnings ==
Henin earned more than 20 million dollars during her career.

Year	Grand Slam singles titles	WTA singles titles	Total singles titles	Earnings ($)	Money list rank
2001	0	3	3	998,704	8
2002	0	2	2	1,213,093	6
2003	2	6	8	3,667,430	2
2004	1	4	5	1,570,656	8
2005	1	3	4	1,705,173	6
2006	1	5	6	4,204,810	1
2007	2	8	10	5,429,586	1
2008	0	2	2	458,470	37
2009	DNP				
2010	0	2	2	1,401,960	11
2011	0	0	0	n/a	n/a
Career	7	36	43	20,863,335	21

== Career Grand Slam statistics ==
=== Grand Slam tournament seedings ===
Legend (slams won / times seeded) seeded No. 1 (**3** / 7) seeded No. 2 (**1** / 2) seeded No. 4–10 (**3** / 13) seeded No. 11–32 (0 / 4) not seeded (0 / 5) qualifier (0 / 1) wild card (0 / 1)	Longest streak 4 1 8 2 3 1 1

Year	Australian Open	French Open	Wimbledon	US Open
1999	absent	qualifier	absent	not seeded
2000	not seeded	absent	not seeded	not seeded
2001	not seeded	14th	8th (1)	6th
2002	6th	5th	6th	8th
2003	5th	**4th (1)**	3rd	**2nd (2)**
2004	**1st (3)**	1st	absent	1st
2005	absent	**10th (4)**	7th	7th
2006	8th (2)	**5th (5)**	3rd (3)	2nd (4)
2007	absent	**1st (6)**	1st	**1st (7)**
2008	1st	absent	absent	absent
2009	absent	absent	absent	absent
2010	wild card (5)	22nd	17th	absent
2011	11th	absent	absent	absent

=== Best Grand Slam results details ===
**Australian Open**
**2004 Australian Open (1st)**
Round	Opponent	Rank	Score
1R	(Australia) Olivia Lukaszewicz (WC)	870	6–0, 6–0
2R	(France) Camille Pin (Q)	168	6–1, 6–4
3R	(Russia) Svetlana Kuznetsova (30)	33	6–2, 7–5
4R	(Italy) Mara Santangelo (Q)	129	6–1, 7–6^{(7–5)}
QF	(United States) Lindsay Davenport (5)	5	7–5, 6–3
SF	(Colombia) Fabiola Zuluaga (32)	36	6–2, 6–2
**W**	(Belgium) Kim Clijsters (2)	2	6–3, 4–6, 6–3

**Wimbledon Championships**
**2001 Wimbledon Championships (8th)**
Round	Opponent	Rank	Score
1R	(France) Sarah Pitkowski	106	6–1, 6–0
2R	(Netherlands) Kristie Boogert (Q)	125	5–7, 7–5, 6–2
3R	(United States) Lisa Raymond (28)	27	6–4, 7–6^{(8–6)}
4R	(Germany) Anke Huber (18)	21	4–6, 6–2, 6–2
QF	(Spain) Conchita Martínez (19)	20	6–1, 6–0
SF	(United States) Jennifer Capriati (8)	4	2–6, 6–4, 6–2
F	**(United States) Venus Williams (2)**	2	1–6, 6–3, 0–6
**2006 Wimbledon Championships (3rd)**
Round	Opponent	Rank	Score
1R	(China) Yuan Meng	99	6–0, 6–1
2R	(Russia) Ekaterina Bychkova	81	6–1, 6–2
3R	(Russia) Anna Chakvetadze (30)	34	6–2, 6–3
4R	(Slovakia) Daniela Hantuchová (15)	18	6–3, 6–1
QF	(France) Séverine Beltrame (Q)	129	6–4, 6–4
SF	(Belgium) Kim Clijsters (2)	2	6–4, 7–6^{(7–4)}
F	**(France) Amélie Mauresmo (1)**	**1**	6–2, 3–6, 4–6

**French Open**
**2003 French Open (4th)**
Round	Opponent	Rank	Score
1R	(Austria) Patricia Wartusch	82	6–3, 7–5
2R	(Croatia) Jelena Kostanić	109	6–2, 6–2
3R	(Madagascar) Dally Randriantefy	83	6–1, 6–1
4R	(Switzerland) Patty Schnyder (19)	18	6–3, 2–6, 6–2
QF	(United States) Chanda Rubin (8)	8	6–3, 6–2
SF	(United States) Serena Williams (1)	1	6–2, 4–6, 7–5
**W**	(Belgium) Kim Clijsters (2)	2	6–0, 6–4
**2005 French Open (10th)**
Round	Opponent	Rank	Score
1R	(Spain) Conchita Martínez	45	6–0, 4–6, 6–4
2R	(Spain) Virginia Ruano Pascual	66	6–1, 6–4
3R	(Spain) Anabel Medina Garrigues	34	4–6, 6–2, 6–3
4R	(Russia) Svetlana Kuznetsova (6)	7	7–6^{(8–6)}, 4–6, 7–5
QF	(Russia) Maria Sharapova (2)	2	6–4, 6–2
SF	(Russia) Nadia Petrova (7)	9	6–2, 6–3
**W**	(France) Mary Pierce (21)	23	6–1, 6–1
**2006 French Open (5th)**
Round	Opponent	Rank	Score
1R	(Estonia) Maret Ani	70	6–3, 6–0
2R	(Belarus) Anastasiya Yakimova	58	6–2, 7–5
3R	(Italy) Tathiana Garbin	72	6–4, 6–0
4R	(Russia) Anastasia Myskina (10)	11	6–1, 6–4
QF	(Germany) Anna-Lena Grönefeld (13)	14	7–5, 6–2
SF	(Belgium) Kim Clijsters (2)	2	6–3, 6–2
**W**	(Russia) Svetlana Kuznetsova (8)	10	6–4, 6–4
**2007 French Open (1st)**
Round	Opponent	Rank	Score
1R	(Russia) Elena Vesnina	65	6–4, 6–3
2R	(Austria) Tamira Paszek	72	7–5, 6–1
3R	(Italy) Mara Santangelo (28)	31	6–2, 6–3
4R	(Austria) Sybille Bammer (20)	25	6–2, 6–4
QF	(United States) Serena Williams (8)	8	6–4, 6–3
SF	(Serbia) Jelena Janković (4)	5	6–2, 6–2
**W**	(Serbia) Ana Ivanovic (7)	7	6–1, 6–2

**US Open**
**2003 US Open (2nd)**
Round	Opponent	Rank	Score
1R	(Hungary) Anikó Kapros (Q)	129	7–5, 6–3
2R	(Croatia) Silvija Talaja	70	6–1, 6–2
3R	(Japan) Saori Obata	75	6–1, 6–2
4R	(Russia) Dinara Safina	71	6–0, 6–3
QF	(Russia) Anastasia Myskina (7)	10	6–2, 6–3
SF	(United States) Jennifer Capriati (6)	7	4–6, 7–5, 7–6^{(7–4)}
**W**	(Belgium) Kim Clijsters (1)	1	7–5, 6–1
**2007 US Open (1st)**
Round	Opponent	Rank	Score
1R	(Germany) Julia Görges (Q)	145	6–0, 6–3
2R	(Bulgaria) Tsvetana Pironkova (Q)	130	6–4, 6–0
3R	(Russia) Ekaterina Makarova (Q)	156	6–0, 6–2
4R	(Russia) Dinara Safina (15)	16	6–0, 6–2
QF	(United States) Serena Williams (8)	9	7–6^{(7–3)}, 6–1
SF	(United States) Venus Williams (12)	14	7–6^{(7–2)}, 6–4
**W**	(Russia) Svetlana Kuznetsova (4)	4	6–1, 6–3

Notes

- Grand Slam winners are in **boldface**, and runner–ups are in italics.

== Wins against top 10 players ==
- She has a 86–56 (61%) record against players who were, at the time the match was played, ranked in the top 10.

#	Player	vsRank	Event	Surface	Round	Score	Rk	Years	Ref
1.	(United States) Venus Williams	2	German Open, Germany	Clay	3R	6–1, 6–4		2001	
2.	(Belgium) Kim Clijsters	7	Rosmalen Championships, Netherlands	Grass	F	6–4, 3–6, 6–3		2001	
3.	(United States) Jennifer Capriati	4	Wimbledon, United Kingdom	Grass	SF	2–6, 6–4, 6–2		2001	
4.	(Socialist Federal Republic of Yugoslavia) Jelena Dokić	8	Amelia Island Championships, United States	Clay (green)	SF	6–2, 4–1 RET		2002	
5.	(United States) Jennifer Capriati	2	German Open, Germany	Clay	SF	5–7, 6–2, 6–1		2002	
6.	(United States) Serena Williams	5	German Open, Germany	Clay	F	6–2, 1–6, 7–6^{(7–5)}		2002	
7.	(Belgium) Kim Clijsters	3	Italian Open, Italy	Clay	SF	7–5, 6–2		2002	
8.	(United States) Monica Seles	4	Wimbledon, United Kingdom	Grass	QF	7–5, 7–6^{(7–4)}		2002	
9.	(United States) Lindsay Davenport	10	Australian Open, Australia	Hard	4R	7–5, 5–7, 9–7		2003	
10.	(Russia) Anastasia Myskina	10	Dubai Championships, United Arab Emirates	Hard	QF	6–1, 6–4		2003	
11.	(United States) Jennifer Capriati	6	Dubai Championships, United Arab Emirates	Hard	SF	7–5, 4–6, 6–4		2003	
12.	(United States) Serena Williams	1	Charleston Open, United States	Clay (green)	F	6–3, 6–4		2003	
13.	(France) Amélie Mauresmo	6	German Open, Germany	Clay	SF	7–6^{(8–6)}, 6–4		2003	
14.	(Belgium) Kim Clijsters	3	German Open, Germany	Clay	F	6–4, 4–6, 7–5		2003	
15.	(United States) Chanda Rubin	8	French Open, France	Clay	QF	6–3, 6–2		2003	
16.	(United States) Serena Williams	1	French Open, France	Clay	SF	6–2, 4–6, 7–5		2003	
17.	(Belgium) Kim Clijsters	2	French Open, France	Clay	F	6–4, 6–0		2003	
18.	(Belgium) Kim Clijsters	2	Southern California Open, United States	Hard	F	3–6, 6–2, 6–3		2003	
19.	(Russia) Anastasia Myskina	10	US Open, United States	Hard	QF	6–2, 6–3		2003	
20.	(United States) Jennifer Capriati	7	US Open, United States	Hard	SF	4–6, 7–5, 7–6^{(7–4)}		2003	
21.	(Belgium) Kim Clijsters	1	US Open, United States	Hard	F	7–5, 6–1		2003	
22.	(Russia) Elena Dementieva	8	Stuttgart Open, Germany	Hard (i)	QF	7–5, 6–0		2003	
23.	(United States) Jennifer Capriati	5	WTA Tour Championships, United States	Hard (i)	RR	6–2, 6–1		2003	
24.	(Russia) Anastasia Myskina	8	WTA Tour Championships, United States	Hard (i)	RR	7–5, 5–7, 7–5		2003	
25.	(United States) Chanda Rubin	10	Sydney International, Australia	Hard	QF	6–3, 4–6, 6–4		2004	
26.	(France) Amélie Mauresmo	4	Sydney International, Australia	Hard	F	6–4, 6–4		2004	
27.	(United States) Lindsay Davenport	5	Australian Open, Australia	Hard	QF	7–5, 6–3		2004	
28.	(Belgium) Kim Clijsters	2	Australian Open, Australia	Hard	F	6–3, 4–6, 6–3		2004	
29.	(Russia) Anastasia Myskina	5	Indian Wells Open, United States	Hard	SF	6–1, 6–1		2004	
30.	(United States) Lindsay Davenport	4	Indian Wells Open, United States	Hard	F	6–1, 6–4		2004	
31.	(Russia) Anastasia Myskina	3	Olympics, Athens, Greece	Hard	SF	7–5, 5–7, 8–6		2004	
32.	(France) Amélie Mauresmo	2	Olympics, Athens, Greece	Hard	F	6–3, 6–3		2004	
33.	(Australia) Alicia Molik	8	Miami Open, United States	Hard	4R	6–4, 2–6, 6–2		2005	
34.	(United States) Lindsay Davenport	1	Charleston Open, United States	Clay (green)	QF	3–6, 6–3, 1–0 RET		2005	
35.	(Russia) Elena Dementieva	5	Charleston Open, United States	Clay (green)	F	7–5, 6–4		2005	
36.	(Russia) Svetlana Kuznetsova	7	Warsaw Open, Poland	Clay	F	3–6, 6–2, 7–5		2005	
37.	(Russia) Maria Sharapova	2	German Open, Germany	Clay	QF	6–2, 6–4		2005	
38.	(Russia) Svetlana Kuznetsova	7	French Open, France	Clay	4R	7–6^{(8–6)}, 4–6, 7–5		2005	
39.	(Russia) Maria Sharapova	2	French Open, France	Clay	QF	6–4, 6–2		2005	
40.	(Russia) Nadia Petrova	9	French Open, France	Clay	SF	6–2, 6–3		2005	
41.	(France) Amélie Mauresmo	3	Canadian Open, Canada	Hard	SF	7–5, 3–6, 6–1		2005	
42.	(United States) Lindsay Davenport	1	Australian Open, Australia	Hard	QF	2–6, 6–2, 6–3		2006	
43.	(Russia) Maria Sharapova	4	Australian Open, Australia	Hard	SF	4–6, 6–1, 6–4		2006	
44.	(Russia) Maria Sharapova	4	Dubai Championships, United Arab Emirates	Hard	F	7–5, 6–2		2006	
45.	(Russia) Nadia Petrova	5	Fed Cup, Liège, Belgium	Clay (i)	RR	6–7^{(2–7)}, 6–4, 6–3		2006	
46.	(Russia) Elena Dementieva	9	Fed Cup, Liège, Belgium	Clay (i)	RR	6–2, 6–0		2006	
47.	(Russia) Svetlana Kuznetsova	10	German Open, Germany	Clay	QF	6–4, 7–6^{(7–2)}		2006	
48.	(France) Amélie Mauresmo	1	German Open, Germany	Clay	SF	6–1, 6–2		2006	
49.	(Belgium) Kim Clijsters	2	French Open, France	Clay	SF	6–3, 6–2		2006	
50.	(Russia) Svetlana Kuznetsova	10	French Open, France	Clay	F	6–4, 6–4		2006	
51.	(Belgium) Kim Clijsters	2	Eastbourne International, United Kingdom	Grass	SF	6–3, 5–7, 6–1		2006	
52.	(Belgium) Kim Clijsters	2	Wimbledon, United Kingdom	Grass	SF	6–4, 6–3, 7–6^{(7–4)}		2006	
53.	(Russia) Svetlana Kuznetsova	7	Connecticut Open, United States	Hard	SF	6–3, 6–3		2006	
54.	(Switzerland) Martina Hingis	7	WTA Tour Championships, Spain	Hard (i)	RR	6–2, 6–7^{(5–7)}, 6–1		2006	
55.	(Russia) Nadia Petrova	5	WTA Tour Championships, Spain	Hard (i)	RR	6–4, 6–4		2006	
56.	(Russia) Maria Sharapova	2	WTA Tour Championships, Spain	Hard (i)	SF	6–2, 7–6^{(7–5)}		2006	
57.	(France) Amélie Mauresmo	1	WTA Tour Championships, Spain	Hard (i)	F	6–4, 6–3		2006	
58.	(Russia) Svetlana Kuznetsova	5	Dubai Championships, United Arab Emirates	Hard	SF	1–6, 6–4, 6–0		2007	
59.	(France) Amélie Mauresmo	3	Dubai Championships, United Arab Emirates	Hard	F	6–4, 7–5		2007	
60.	(Serbia) Jelena Janković	10	Qatar Open, Qatar	Hard	SF	6–7^{(7–5)}, 6–2, 6–4		2007	
61.	(Russia) Svetlana Kuznetsova	5	Qatar Open, Qatar	Hard	F	6–4, 6–2		2007	
62.	(Russia) Nadia Petrova	7	Miami Open, United States	Hard	QF	7–6^{(7–4)}, 7–6^{(7–4)}		2007	
63.	(Serbia) Jelena Janković	7	Warsaw Open, Poland	Clay	SF	7–5, 2–6, 6–4		2007	
64.	(Serbia) Jelena Janković	6	German Open, Germany	Clay	QF	3–6, 6–4, 6–4		2007	
65.	(United States) Serena Williams	8	French Open, France	Clay	QF	6–4, 6–3		2007	
66.	(Serbia) Jelena Janković	5	French Open, France	Clay	SF	6–2, 6–2		2007	
67.	(Serbia) Ana Ivanovic	7	French Open, France	Clay	F	6–1, 6–2		2007	
68.	(France) Amélie Mauresmo	4	Eastbourne International, United Kingdom	Grass	F	7–5, 6–7^{(4–7)}, 7–6^{(7–2)}		2007	
69.	(United States) Serena Williams	8	Wimbledon, United Kingdom	Grass	QF	6–4, 3–6, 6–3		2007	
70.	(Russia) Nadia Petrova	9	Canadian Open, Canada	Hard	QF	7–6^{(7–4)}, 6–3		2007	
71.	(Serbia) Jelena Janković	3	Canadian Open, Canada	Hard	F	7–6^{(7–3)}, 7–5		2007	
72.	(United States) Serena Williams	9	US Open, United States	Hard	QF	7–6^{(7–3)}, 6–1		2007	
73.	(Russia) Svetlana Kuznetsova	4	US Open, United States	Hard	F	6–1, 6–3		2007	
74.	(Serbia) Jelena Janković	3	Stuttgart Open, Germany	Hard	SF	7–6^{(7–2)}, 7–5		2007	
75.	(Russia) Anna Chakvetadze	7	WTA Tour Championships, Spain	Hard (i)	RR	6–1, 7–6^{(7–4)}		2007	
76.	(Serbia) Jelena Janković	3	WTA Tour Championships, Spain	Hard (i)	RR	6–2, 6–2		2007	
77.	(France) Marion Bartoli	10	WTA Tour Championships, Spain	Hard (i)	RR	6–0, 6–0		2007	
78.	(Serbia) Ana Ivanovic	4	WTA Tour Championships, Spain	Hard (i)	SF	6–4, 6–4		2007	
79.	(Russia) Maria Sharapova	6	WTA Tour Championships, Spain	Hard (i)	F	5–7, 7–5, 6–3		2007	
80.	(Serbia) Ana Ivanovic	4	Sydney International, Australia	Hard	SF	6–2, 2–6, 6–4		2008	
81.	(Russia) Svetlana Kuznetsova	2	Sydney International, Australia	Hard	F	4–6, 6–2, 6–4		2008	
82.	(Russia) Elena Dementieva	5	Australian Open, Australia	Hard	2R	7–5, 7–6^{(8–6)}		2010	
83.	(Russia) Elena Dementieva	6	Miami Open, United States	Hard	2R	6–3, 6–2		2010	
84.	(Denmark) Caroline Wozniacki	2	Miami Open, United States	Hard	QF	6–7^{(5–7)}, 6–3, 6–4		2010	
85.	(Serbia) Jelena Janković	7	Stuttgart Open, Germany	Clay	QF	3–6, 7–6^{(7–4)}, 6–3		2010	
86.	(Australia) Samantha Stosur	10	Stuttgart Open, Germany	Clay	F	6–4, 2–6, 6–1		2010	

== Longest winning streaks ==
=== 32-match win streak (2007–08) ===
#	Tournament	Category	Start date	Surface	Rd	Opponent	Rank	Score
–	Wimbledon Championships	Grand Slam	25 June 2007	Grass	SF	(France) Marion Bartoli (18)	19	6–1, 5–7, 1–6
1	Canadian Open	Tier I	13 August 2007	Hard	2R	(Slovenia) Andreja Klepač (Q)	141	6–3, 6–1
2	Canadian Open	Tier I	13 August 2007	Hard	3R	(China) Peng Shuai	58	7–5, 6–2
3	Canadian Open	Tier I	13 August 2007	Hard	QF	(Russia) Nadia Petrova (6)	9	7–6^{(7–4)}, 6–3
4	Canadian Open	Tier I	13 August 2007	Hard	SF	(China) Yan Zi (Q)	169	6–3, 6–0
5	Canadian Open	Tier I	13 August 2007	Hard	F	(Serbia) Jelena Janković (2)	3	7–6^{(7–3)}, 7–5
6	US Open	Grand Slam	27 August 2007	Hard	1R	(Germany) Julia Görges (Q)	145	6–0, 6–3
7	US Open	Grand Slam	27 August 2007	Hard	2R	(Bulgaria) Tsvetana Pironkova (Q)	130	6–4, 6–0
8	US Open	Grand Slam	27 August 2007	Hard	3R	(Russia) Ekaterina Makarova (Q)	156	6–0, 6–2
9	US Open	Grand Slam	27 August 2007	Hard	4R	(Russia) Dinara Safina (15)	16	6–0, 6–2
10	US Open	Grand Slam	27 August 2007	Hard	QF	(United States) Serena Williams (8)	9	7–6^{(7–3)}, 6–1
11	US Open	Grand Slam	27 August 2007	Hard	SF	(United States) Venus Williams (12)	14	7–6^{(7–2)}, 6–4
12	US Open	Grand Slam	27 August 2007	Hard	F	(Russia) Svetlana Kuznetsova (4)	4	6–1, 6–3
13	Stuttgart Open	Tier II	1 October 2007	Hard (i)	2R	(Russia) Dinara Safina	17	6–4, 6–1
14	Stuttgart Open	Tier II	1 October 2007	Hard (i)	QF	(Russia) Elena Dementieva	15	6–4, 6–4
15	Stuttgart Open	Tier II	1 October 2007	Hard (i)	SF	(Serbia) Jelena Janković (2)	3	7–6^{(7–2)}, 7–5
16	Stuttgart Open	Tier II	1 October 2007	Hard (i)	F	(France) Tatiana Golovin	19	2–6, 6–2, 6–1
17	Zürich Open	Tier I	15 October 2007	Hard (i)	2R	(Russia) Vera Zvonareva	23	6–3, 6–1
18	Zürich Open	Tier I	15 October 2007	Hard (i)	QF	(Poland) Agnieszka Radwańska (LL)	31	6–4, 6–2
19	Zürich Open	Tier I	15 October 2007	Hard (i)	SF	(Czech Republic) Nicole Vaidišová	15	3–6, 6–3, 7–5
20	Zürich Open	Tier I	15 October 2007	Hard (i)	F	(France) Tatiana Golovin	18	6–4, 6–4
21	WTA Tour Championships	WTA Tour Finals	6 November 2007	Hard (i)	RR	(France) Marion Bartoli (9/Alt)	10	6–0, 6–0
22	WTA Tour Championships	WTA Tour Finals	6 November 2007	Hard (i)	RR	(Serbia) Jelena Janković (3)	3	6–2, 6–2
23	WTA Tour Championships	WTA Tour Finals	6 November 2007	Hard (i)	RR	(Russia) Anna Chakvetadze (7)	7	6–1, 7–6^{(7–4)}
24	WTA Tour Championships	WTA Tour Finals	6 November 2007	Hard (i)	SF	(Serbia) Ana Ivanovic (4)	4	6–4, 6–4
25	WTA Tour Championships	WTA Tour Finals	6 November 2007	Hard (i)	F	(Russia) Maria Sharapova (6)	6	5–7, 7–5, 6–3
–	Sydney International	Tier II	7 January 2008	Hard	2R	(Czech Republic) Lucie Šafářová	22	w/o
26	Sydney International	Tier II	7 January 2008	Hard	QF	(Estonia) Kaia Kanepi (Q)	73	6–2, 6–0
27	Sydney International	Tier II	7 January 2008	Hard	SF	(Serbia) Ana Ivanovic (4)	4	6–2, 2–6, 6–4
28	Sydney International	Tier II	7 January 2008	Hard	F	(Russia) Svetlana Kuznetsova (2)	2	4–6, 6–2, 6–4
29	Australian Open	Grand Slam	14 January 2008	Hard	1R	(Japan) Aiko Nakamura	73	6–2, 6–2
30	Australian Open	Grand Slam	14 January 2008	Hard	2R	(Russia) Olga Puchkova	97	6–1, 7–5
31	Australian Open	Grand Slam	14 January 2008	Hard	3R	(Italy) Francesca Schiavone (25)	24	7–5, 6–4
32	Australian Open	Grand Slam	14 January 2008	Hard	4R	(Chinese Taipei) Hsieh Su-wei (Q)	158	6–2, 6–2
–	Australian Open	Grand Slam	14 January 2008	Hard	QF	(Russia) Maria Sharapova (5)	5	4–6, 0–6

== Comparison of the 2003–present year-end number ones ==
Comparisons between the WTA singles year-end number one ranked players from 2003, the year Henin was first ranked year-end number one.

=== Ranking points ===
Adjusted to reflect the raising of the points scale (2007 and 2009), reduction of tournaments counted (2009) and removal of quality points (2006). Not an exact figure but a good approximation of how they would have scored under the current system. Original total in brackets.

1. Serena Williams 2013 – 13,260
2. Justine Henin 2007 – 12310 (6155)
3. Justine Henin 2003 – 11514 (6628)
4. Justine Henin 2006 – 11423 (3998)
5. Victoria Azarenka 2012 10595
6. Lindsay Davenport 2005 – 9334 (4910)
7. Jelena Jankovic 2008 – 9120 (4710)
8. Serena Williams 2009 – 9075
9. Lindsay Davenport 2004 – 8317 (4760)
10. Caroline Wozniacki 2010 – 8035
11. Caroline Wozniacki 2011 – 7485

=== Tournaments won ===
1. Serena Williams 2013 – 11 (2 GS + YEC)
2. Justine Henin 2007 – 10 (2 GS + YEC)
3. Justine Henin 2003 – 8 (2 GS)
4. Lindsay Davenport 2004 – 7
5. Justine Henin 2006 – 6 (1 GS + YEC)
Victoria Azarenka 2012 – 6 (1 GS)
Lindsay Davenport 2005 – 6
Caroline Wozniacki 2010 – 6
Caroline Wozniacki 2011 – 6
10. Jelena Jankovic 2008 – 4
11. Serena Williams 2009 – 3 (2 GS + YEC)

=== Tournaments played ===
1. Jelena Jankovic 2008 – 22
Caroline Wozniacki 2010 – 22
Caroline Wozniacki 2011 – 22
4. Justine Henin 2003 – 18
5. Lindsay Davenport 2004 – 17
6. Lindsay Davenport 2005 – 16
Serena Williams 2009 – 16
8. Justine Henin 2007 – 15
9. Serena Williams 2013 – 14
10. Justine Henin 2006 – 13

=== Winning percentage ===
1. Serena Williams 2013 – 95.12%
2. Justine Henin 2007 – 94.0%
3. Justine Henin 2006 – 88.2%
4. Justine Henin 2003 – 87.4%
  Victoria Azarenka 2012 – 87.4%
5. Lindsay Davenport 2004 – 86.3%
6. Lindsay Davenport 2005 – 83.3%
7. Serena Williams 2009 – 79.4%
8. Caroline Wozniacki 2011 – 78.8%
  Caroline Wozniacki 2010 – 78.8%

=== Lead over #2 ranked player ===
Percentage of ranking points

1. Justine Henin 2007 – 39.5% (Kuznetsova)
2. Serena Williams 2013 – 39.3% (Azarenka)
3. Jelena Jankovic 2008 – 18.0% (S Williams)
4. Caroline Wozniacki 2010 – 15.0% (Zvonareva)
5. Serena Williams 2009 – 14.0% (Safina)
6. Justine Henin 2006 – 11.7% (Sharapova)
7. Lindsay Davenport 2004 – 4.5% (Mauresmo)
8. Lindsay Davenport 2005 – 1.7% (Clijsters)
9. Caroline Wozniacki 2011 – 1.5% (Kvitova)
10. Justine Henin 2003 – 1.1% (Clijsters)

=== Lead over #10 ranked player ===
Percentage of ranking points

1. Serena Williams 2013 – 73.5% (Wozniacki)
2. Justine Henin 2003 – 66.5% (Sugiyama)
3. Justine Henin 2006 – 65.2% (Vaidisova)
4. Justine Henin 2007 – 64.4% (Bartoli)
5. Serena Williams 2009 – 62.0% (Radwanska)
6. Jelena Jankovic 2008 – 61.5% (Radwanska)
7. Lindsay Davenport 2004 – 50.4% (Capriati)
8. Caroline Wozniacki 2010 – 47.0% (Azarenka)
9. Lindsay Davenport 2005 – 46.5% (V Williams)
10. Caroline Wozniacki 2011 – 38.8% (Petkovic)
