= 2007 WTA Tour Championships =

- Date: 6–11 November
- Edition: 37th
- Draw: 8S / 4D
- Location: Madrid, Spain
- Venue: Madrid Arena

Champions

Singles
- (Belgium) Justine Henin

Doubles
- (Zimbabwe) Cara Black / (United States) Liezel Huber
← 2006 ·	WTA Finals	· 2008 →

The 2007 WTA Tour Championships, officially Sony Ericsson Championships, is the thirty seventh season-ending WTA Tour Championships, the annual tennis tournament for the eight best female tennis players in singles, and four teams in doubles, on the 2007 WTA Tour. It was held from 6 November though 11 November 2007, in Madrid, Spain.

Since 2005, main tournament sponsor is Sony Ericsson; and for the second time, the final event in the Sony Ericsson WTA Tour calendar is held in Spain, on Casa de Campo grounds, in Madrid Arena.

Justine Henin from Belgium won the tournament and the check for $1 million, her second tournament title in a row, defeating Maria Sharapova in three sets. Cara Black and Liezel Huber defeated Ai Sugiyama and Katarina Srebotnik in the final of doubles competition.

== Finals ==
=== Singles ===
(Belgium) Justine Henin defeated (Russia) Maria Sharapova, 5–7, 7–5, 6–3.

=== Doubles ===
(Zimbabwe) Cara Black / (United States) Liezel Huber defeated (Slovenia) Katarina Srebotnik / (Japan) Ai Sugiyama, 5–7, 6–3, [10–8].

== Qualifying ==
=== Singles ===
Singles Qualifiers (29 October 2007)
Rk	Name	Points	Tour
1	Justine Henin (BEL)	5,405	13
2	Svetlana Kuznetsova (RUS)	3,690	18
3	Jelena Janković (SRB)	3,475	27
4	Ana Ivanovic (SRB)	3,161	19
5	Serena Williams (USA)	2,767	11
6	Anna Chakvetadze (RUS)	2,660	21
7	Venus Williams (USA)	2,470	13
8	Maria Sharapova (RUS)	2,431	12
9	Daniela Hantuchová (SVK)	2,242	26

On August 1, the first two players to qualify for the Championships were Justine Henin from Belgium and Jelena Janković from Serbia. Henin, last year's winner, leads the Sony Ericsson WTA Tour with nine singles titles already claimed in 2007, including French Open and US Open, and also titles in Dubai, Doha, Warsaw, Eastbourne, Toronto, Stuttgart and Zurich. Janković is the first Serbian woman representing her country to qualify for the season-ending event. This season, she has won four singles titles on the Sony Ericsson WTA Tour at Auckland, Charleston, Rome, and Birmingham. She also reached the semifinals at the French Open.

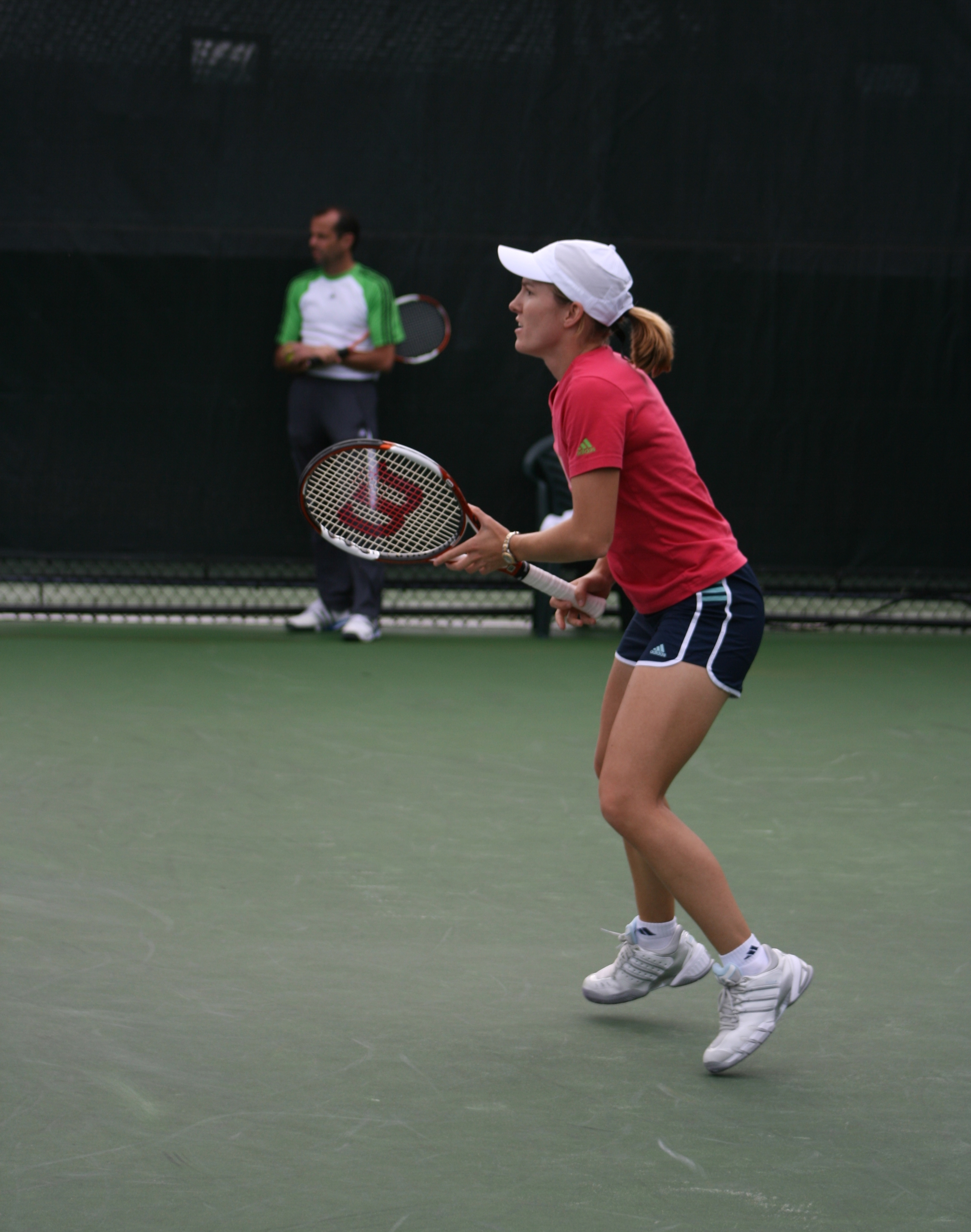
Justine Henin won two Grand Slam titles

By reaching the semifinals on September 7, and later the final of the US Open, Svetlana Kuznetsova from Russia moved up to third on the Sony Ericsson Points Standings, just behind Henin and Janković. Her season highlights include winning the New Haven tournament a week before the US Open, and four runner-up finishes in Doha, Indian Wells, Berlin and Rome.

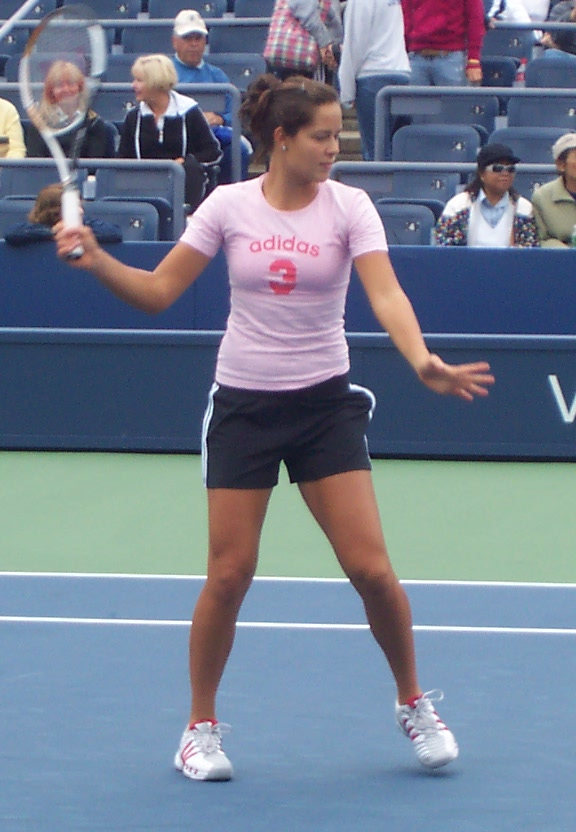
Ana Ivanovic reached her first Grand Slam final

Ana Ivanovic from Serbia was the fourth player to qualify, by reaching the semifinals on September 27 at Luxembourg. Ivanovic was this year's runner-up at the French Open, and a semifinalist at Wimbledon. This season Ivanovic has won tournaments in Berlin, Los Angeles and Luxembourg.

Serena Williams of the United States, and 8-time singles Grand Slam champion was the fifth player to qualify on October 15 by virtue of reaching the finals in Moscow. Williams was also this year's winner at the Australian Open and in Key Biscayne. She also reached the quarterfinals of the French Open, Wimbledon and the US Open.

Anna Chakvetadze from Russia became the sixth player to qualify on October 23, ensuring herself one of the eight berths by collecting 2,626 race points. Chakvetadze is having the best season of her career, having won four singles titles at Hobart, 's-Hertogenbosch, Cincinnati and Stanford. She has won over 50 singles matches, reached the semifinals of the US Open and the quarterfinals of the Australian Open and Roland Garros, in addition to winning over $1 million in prize money so far.

Wimbledon champion Venus Williams was forced to withdraw on October 28 due to severe dizziness. In 2007, the American won three titles, winning Memphis, Seoul and her sixth Grand Slam title at the Wimbledon Championships.

The last two places went to Daniela Hantuchová and, due to the withdrawal of Williams, Maria Sharapova. Both had exceptional seasons on the Tour, with Hantuchová winning her first title in five years at Indian Wells and following it up with a win at Linz, as well as runner-up finishes at Bali and Luxembourg. Sharapova was the runner-up at the first Grand Slam of the year, the Australian Open, and also won the title at San Diego. She also reached the semifinals of the French Open.

=== Doubles teams ===
Doubles Qualifiers (22 October 2007)
Rk	Name	Points	Tour
1	(Zimbabwe) Cara Black (ZIM) & Liezel Huber (United States)	6,375	21
2	Lisa Raymond (United States) & (Australia) Samantha Stosur (AUS)	3,628	13
3	(Chinese Taipei) Chan Yung-jan (TPE) & (Chinese Taipei) Chuang Chia-jung (TPE)	3,146	13
4	(Japan) Ai Sugiyama (JPN) & (Slovenia) Katarina Srebotnik (SLO)	2,622	10
5	(Czech Republic) Květa Peschke (CZE) & (Australia) Rennae Stubbs (AUS)	2,537	13

On August 16, Cara Black, from Zimbabwe, and Liezel Huber originally from South Africa, who became American citizen in August; were the first team to qualify for the Championships. In 2007 season, they won seven tournaments, including two Grand Slams, Australian Open and Wimbledon Championships, and also tournaments in Paris, Antwerp, Dubai, San Diego and Moscow.

The two-time defending champions in 2005 and 2006, Lisa Raymond and Samantha Stosur are unable to compete in this year's Championships, due to a viral illness from which Stosur is recuperating. In 2007, the American-Australian duo won four Tier-I tournaments in Tokyo, Indian Wells, Key Biscayne, Berlin, and also the tournament in Eastbourne.

Chan Yung-jan and Chuang Chia-jung, from Taiwan, have become the second team to qualify for Madrid, officials announced on October 22. Chan and Chung won three Tour doubles titles this year, including tournaments in Bangalore, Birmingham, and in 's-Hertogenbosch. They also holds runner-up trophies this year at the Australian Open, and the US Open.

Slovenian-Japanese duo, Katarina Srebotnik and Ai Sugiyama and the Czech-Australian duo of Květa Peschke and Rennae Stubbs are the third and fourth teams to qualify. Srebotnik and Sugiyama won only one title, in Toronto, and also runners-up at French Open and Wimbledon. It is Srebotnik's first individual trip, while Sugiyama makes her sixth. In 2007, Peschke and Stubbs won tournaments in Los Angeles, Stuttgart, and in Zurich.

== Prize money and points ==
From the 2001 WTA Tour, prize money for the Sony Ericsson Championships is three million United States dollars.

Stage	Singles	Doubles^{1}	Points
Winner(s)	$1,000,000	$250,000	750
Finalist(s)	$500,000	$125,000	525
Semifinalists	$250,000	$62,500	335
Round robin-3rd^{2}	$130,000	-	185
Round robin-4th	$100,000	-	105
Alternates	$20,000	-	0

- ^{1} Prize money for doubles is per team.
- ^{2} Third place points and prize money in the yellow group is divided into two parts, one third ($33,333 and 35 points) goes to Serena Williams, because she played one match, and two thirds ($96,666 + $20,000 as one of the alternates, and 150 points) to Marion Bartoli, the first alternate and who played two matches.

== Seeds and draw ==
The draw consisted of eight players in singles, and four teams in doubles. Players or teams were seeded based on the WTA Tour Rankings current the week prior to the Sony Ericsson Championships, on Monday, October 29.

=== Singles ===
The draw was conducted on Saturday, November 3 by retired Spanish tennis player, Arantxa Sánchez Vicario, Sony Ericsson WTA Tour CEO Larry Scott, and player representative to this tournament, Anna Chakvetadze. Players were divided into two groups, red and yellow, in honor of the colors of the Spanish flag.

Seed	Player	Rank
1	(Belgium) Justine Henin	1
3	(Serbia) Jelena Janković	3
5	(United States) Serena Williams (withdrew)	5
7	(Russia) Anna Chakvetadze	7
Alt.	(France) Marion Bartoli	10

Seed	Player	Rank
2	(Russia) Svetlana Kuznetsova	2
4	(Serbia) Ana Ivanovic	4
6	(Russia) Maria Sharapova	6
8	(Slovakia) Daniela Hantuchová	9

After the draw in singles had been determined, the next two players who would be accepted into the Sony Ericsson Championships, based on total WTA Tour Ranking points in 2007, became the alternates. The alternates were only in singles, and they were required to be in Madrid along with other players who competed. The two alternates on standby were Marion Bartoli and Elena Dementieva; with Bartoli entering the tournament on day 3 due to Serena William's withdrawal.

=== Doubles ===
Doubles teams started the tournament at the semifinal stage, with the winners of Saturday's opening round advancing to Sunday's final. The doubles draw was conducted on Thursday night, on November 8.

Seed	Teams	Rank
1	(Zimbabwe) Cara Black & (United States) Liezel Huber	3
2	(Japan) Ai Sugiyama & (Slovenia) Katarina Srebotnik	14
3	(Chinese Taipei) Chan Yung-jan & (Chinese Taipei) Chuang Chia-jung	16
4	(Czech Republic) Květa Peschke & (Australia) Rennae Stubbs	21

== Singles Championship Race ==
=== Singles ===
Players in gold have qualified for Madrid. Players in brown have qualified, but withdrawn. The low-ranked players in blue after them would be played as alternates in Madrid.

Rank	Player	Mandatory Events					Best Other Tournaments												Total points	Tourn
Rank	Player	AUS	FRA	WIM	USO	MIA	1	2	3	4	5	6	7	8	9	10	11	12	Total points	Tourn
1	(Belgium) Justine Henin	A 0	W 1000	SF; 450	W 1000	F 350	W 430	W 430	W 300	W 300	W 275	W 275	W 275	SF; 195	SF; 125				5,405	13
2	(Serbia) Jelena Janković	R16; 140	SF; 450	R16; 140	QF; 250	R32; 45	W 430	W 430	F 300	F 190	F 190	W 140	SF; 140	SF; 140	SF; 125	SF; 125	SF; 125	W 115	4,097	27
2	(Serbia) Jelena Janković						QF; 110	QF; 110	F 100	QF; 70	R16; 65	SF; 65	R16; 60	QF; 40	R32; 1	R16; 1			4,097	27
3	(Russia) Svetlana Kuznetsova	R16; 140	QF; 250	QF; 250	F 700	R16; 70	F 325	F 300	F 300	W 275	SF; 195	F 190	SF; 140	SF; 140	SF; 125	QF; 110	QF; 110	QF; 70	3,691	18
3	(Russia) Svetlana Kuznetsova						R16; 1												3,691	18
4	(Serbia) Ana Ivanovic	R32; 90	F 700	SF; 450	R16; 140	R64; 1	W 430	F 300	W 275	W 275	SF; 125	QF; 70	QF; 70	R16; 65	R16; 60	R16; 40	QF; 35	QF; 35	3,163	19
4	(Serbia) Ana Ivanovic						R32; 1	R16; 1											3,163	19
5	(United States) Serena Williams	W 1000	QF; 250	QF; 250	QF; 250	W 500	F 300	QF; 110	R32; 1	QF; 75	QF; 30	R32; 1							2,767	11
6	(Russia) Anna Chakvetadze	QF; 250	QF; 250	R32; 90	SF; 450	SF; 225	W 275	SF; 195	W 140	W 140	SF; 125	W 115	QF; 70	QF; 70	QF; 70	QF; 70	R16; 65	R16; 60	2,698	21
6	(Russia) Anna Chakvetadze						R32; 35	R32; 1	R16; 1	R16; 1									2,698	21
7	(United States) Venus Williams	A 0	R32; 90	W 1000	SF; 450	R32; 45	SF; 195	W 140	W 115	QF; 110	F 100	QF; 70	QF; 70	SF; 65	R16; 20				2,470	14
8	(Slovakia) Daniela Hantuchová	R16; 140	R32; 90	R16; 140	R128; 2	R32; 45	W 465	W 275	SF; 195	F 190	SF; 125	SF; 125	F 115	QF; 75	QF; 70	SF; 65	SF; 65	R16; 60	2,431	26
8	(Slovakia) Daniela Hantuchová						R16; 60	R16; 40	QF; 35	R16; 35	R16; 15	R32; 1	R32; 1	R64; 1	R16; 1				2,431	26
9	(Russia) Maria Sharapova	F 700	SF; 450	R16; 140	R32; 90	R16; 70	W 430	SF; 195	SF; 125	F 100	SF; 65	R16; 65	R16; 1						2,431	12
10	(France) Marion Bartoli	R64; 60	R16; 140	F 700	R16; 140	R64; 1	SF; 125	SF; 125	SF; 125	QF; 110	QF; 110	F 80	QF; 70	SF; 65	SF; 65	R16; 65	R16; 60	R16; 60	2,224	30
10	(France) Marion Bartoli						R32; 35	QF; 30	R16; 20	R16; 15	R16; 15	R32; 1	R32; 1	R32; 1	R64; 1	R16; 1	R32; 1	R32; 1	2,224	30
10	(France) Marion Bartoli						R32; 1												2,224	30
11	(Russia) Elena Dementieva	R16; 140	R32; 90	R32; 90	R32; 90	A 0	W 430	SF; 195	SF; 195	W 140	SF; 125	QF; 110	QF; 75	QF; 70	QF; 70	QF; 70	R16; 60	R16; 35	2,023	20
11	(Russia) Elena Dementieva						R16; 35	R16; 1	R32; 1	R32; 1									2,023	20

== See also ==
- 2007 in tennis
- 2007 Tennis Masters Cup
