= 2007 Dubai Tennis Championships =

- Date: February 19 – 24 (women); February 26 – March 4 (men)
- Edition: 15th (men) / 7th (women)
- Surface: Hard / Outdoor
- Location: Dubai, United Arab Emirates
- Venue: Aviation Club Tennis Centre

Champions

Men's singles
- (Switzerland) Roger Federer

Women's singles
- (Belgium) Justine Henin

Men's doubles
- (France) Fabrice Santoro / (Serbia) Nenad Zimonjić

Women's doubles
- (Zimbabwe) Cara Black / (South Africa) Liezel Huber
- Dubai Tennis Championships

The 2007 Dubai Duty Free Men's Championship and Dubai Duty Free Women's Championship were the 15th edition of this professional tennis tournament and was played on outdoor hard courts. The tournament was part of the International Series Gold of the 2007 ATP and the Tier II series of the 2007 WTA Tour. It took place in Dubai, United Arab Emirates from February 19 through 24 for the women, and from February 26 through March 4, 2007 for the men.

== Review ==
The event was won by Roger Federer in men's singles, Justine Henin in women's singles, Fabrice Santoro and Nenad Zimonjić in men's doubles, and Cara Black and Liezel Huber in women's doubles.

For both Federer and Henin, it was their fourth triumph in Dubai and both hold the record for most wins here. Defending champion Rafael Nadal lost in the quarterfinals to Mikhail Youzhny, with Youzhny also defeating Nadal in the 2006 US Open quarterfinals.

== Finals ==
=== Men's singles ===
(Switzerland) Roger Federer defeated (Russia) Mikhail Youzhny, 6–4, 6–3

=== Women's singles ===
(Belgium) Justine Henin defeated (France) Amélie Mauresmo, 6–4, 7–5

=== Men's doubles ===
(France) Fabrice Santoro / (Serbia) Nenad Zimonjić defeated (India) Mahesh Bhupathi / (Czech Republic) Radek Štěpánek, 7–5, 6–7^{(3–7)}, [10–7]

=== Women's doubles ===
(Zimbabwe) Cara Black / (South Africa) Liezel Huber defeated (Russia) Svetlana Kuznetsova / (Australia) Alicia Molik, 7–6^{(7–5)}, 6–4
