= 2007 Dubai Tennis Championships – Women's doubles =

Women's doubles
- 2007 Dubai Tennis Championships

Final
- Champions: (Zimbabwe) Cara Black (South Africa) Liezel Huber
- Runners-up: (Russia) Svetlana Kuznetsova (Australia) Alicia Molik
- Score: 7-6^{(8-6)}, 6-4

Events
Singles	men	women
Doubles	men	women
- Dubai Tennis Championships

Květa Peschke and Francesca Schiavone were the defending champions. They were both present but did not compete together.
Peschke partnered with Janette Husárová, but lost in the quarterfinals to Daniela Hantuchová and Ai Sugiyama.
Schiavone partnered with Katarina Srebotnik, but lost in the semifinals to Svetlana Kuznetsova and Alicia Molik.

Cara Black and Liezel Huber won in the final 7–6(6), 6–4, against Svetlana Kuznetsova and Alicia Molik.

== Seeds ==
1. (Zimbabwe) Cara Black
  (South Africa) Liezel Huber (champions)
2. (Italy) Francesca Schiavone
  (Slovenia) Katarina Srebotnik (semifinals)
3. (Slovakia) Daniela Hantuchová
  (Japan) Ai Sugiyama (semifinals)
4. (Germany) Anna-Lena Grönefeld
  (United States) Meghann Shaughnessy (first round)

== Draw ==
Key

- Q = Qualifier
- WC = Wild card
- LL = Lucky loser
- Alt = Alternate
- ITF = ITF entry
- PR = Protected ranking
- SR = Special ranking
- SE = Special exempt
- JE = Junior exempt
- JR = Junior Accelerator Programme entrant
- CO = College Accelerator Programme entrant
- NG = Next Gen Accelerator Program entrant
- w/o = Walkover
- r = Retired
- d = Defaulted

=== Draw ===
First round
1	(Zimbabwe) C Black (South Africa) L Huber	2	6	6
(Serbia) J Janković (China) N Li	6	4	4
(Ukraine) M Koryttseva (Germany) M Müller	4	2
(Italy) M Santangelo (Czech Republic) V Uhlířova	6	6
4	(Slovakia) D Hantuchová (Japan) A Sugiyama	6	6
(Croatia) J Kostanić Tošić (Ukraine) T Perebiynis	4	1
(Slovakia) J Husárová (Czech Republic) K Peschke	6	6
WC	(Switzerland) M Hingis (Russia) M Kirilenko	2	4
(Spain) A Medina Garrigues (Hungary) Á Szávay	6^{2}	6	1
(Ukraine) K Bondarenko (Russia) V Dushevina	7^{7}	4	6
WC	(Russia) S Kuznetsova (Australia) A Molik	6	6
4	(Germany) A-L Grönefeld (United States) M Shaughnessy	2	4
(Romania) A Ehritt-Vanc (Russia) A Rodionova	6
(Russia) E Likhovtseva (Russia) E Vesnina	1	r
(Greece) E Daniilidou (Germany) J Wöhr	3	3
2	(Italy) F Schiavone (Slovenia) K Srebotnik	6	6

Quarterfinals
1	(Zimbabwe) C Black (South Africa) L Huber	7	6
(Italy) M Santangelo (Czech Republic) V Uhlířova	5	3
4	(Slovakia) D Hantuchová (Japan) A Sugiyama	6	6
(Slovakia) J Husárová (Czech Republic) K Peschke	3	1
WC	(Russia) S Kuznetsova (Australia) A Molik	6	6
(Ukraine) K Bondarenko (Russia) V Dushevina	4	4
(Romania) A Ehritt-Vanc (Russia) A Rodionova	0	6^{2}
2	(Italy) F Schiavone (Slovenia) K Srebotnik	6	7^{7}

Semifinals
1	(Zimbabwe) C Black (South Africa) L Huber	6	6
4	(Slovakia) D Hantuchová (Japan) A Sugiyama	2	1
WC	(Russia) S Kuznetsova (Australia) A Molik	6	6^{3}	6
2	(Italy) F Schiavone (Slovenia) K Srebotnik	3	7^{7}	4

Final
1	(Zimbabwe) C Black (South Africa) L Huber	7^{8}	6
WC	(Russia) S Kuznetsova (Australia) A Molik	6^{6}	4
