= 2007 WTA Tour Championships – Doubles =

Doubles
- 2007 WTA Tour Championships

Final
- Champions: (Zimbabwe) Cara Black (United States) Liezel Huber
- Runners-up: (Slovenia) Katarina Srebotnik (Japan) Ai Sugiyama
- Score: 5–7, 6–3, [10–8]

Details
- Draw: 4
- Seeds: 4

Events
Singles	Doubles
- WTA Tour Championships

Cara Black and Liezel Huber defeated Katarina Srebotnik and Ai Sugiyama in the final, 5–7, 6–3, [10–8] to win the doubles tennis title at the 2007 WTA Tour Championships.

Lisa Raymond and Samantha Stosur were the reigning champions, but did not participate this year.

This was the first edition of the tournament to utilise a super tiebreak instead of a third set.

== Seeds ==
1. (Zimbabwe) Cara Black / (United States) Liezel Huber (champions)
2. (Slovenia) Katarina Srebotnik / (Japan) Ai Sugiyama (final)
3. (Chinese Taipei) Chan Yung-jan / (Chinese Taipei) Chuang Chia-jung (semifinals)
4. (Czech Republic) Květa Peschke / (Australia) Rennae Stubbs (semifinals)

== Draw ==
Key

- Q = Qualifier
- WC = Wild card
- LL = Lucky loser
- Alt = Alternate
- ITF = ITF entry
- PR = Protected ranking
- SR = Special ranking
- SE = Special exempt
- JE = Junior exempt
- JR = Junior Accelerator Programme entrant
- CO = College Accelerator Programme entrant
- NG = Next Gen Accelerator Program entrant
- w/o = Walkover
- r = Retired
- d = Defaulted

=== Finals ===
Semifinals
1	(Zimbabwe) Cara Black (United States) Liezel Huber	7^{7}	4	[10]
4	(Czech Republic) Květa Peschke (Australia) Rennae Stubbs	6^{3}	6	[6]
3	(Chinese Taipei) Chan Yung-jan (Chinese Taipei) Chuang Chia-jung	2	2
2	(Slovenia) Katarina Srebotnik (Japan) Ai Sugiyama	6	6

Final
1	(Zimbabwe) Cara Black (United States) Liezel Huber	5	6	[10]
2	(Slovenia) Katarina Srebotnik (Japan) Ai Sugiyama	7	3	[8]
