= 2008 Qatar Ladies Open – Singles =

Singles
- 2008 Qatar Ladies Open

Final
- Champion: (Russia) Maria Sharapova
- Runner-up: (Russia) Vera Zvonareva
- Score: 6–1, 2–6, 6–0

Details
- Draw: 56
- Seeds: 16

Events
Singles	Doubles
← 2007 ·	Qatar Ladies Open	· 2011 →

Maria Sharapova defeated Vera Zvonareva in the final, 6–1, 2–6, 6–0 to win the singles tennis title at the 2008 WTA Qatar Open.

Justine Henin was the reigning champion, but she chose not to participate that year.

== Seeds ==
The top eight seeds receive a bye into the second round.

1. (Serbia) Ana Ivanovic (third round, withdrew due to a left ankle sprain)
2. (Russia) Svetlana Kuznetsova (third round)
3. (Serbia) Jelena Janković (quarterfinals)
4. (Russia) Maria Sharapova (champion)
5. (Russia) Anna Chakvetadze (second round)
6. (United States) Venus Williams (third round)
7. (Slovakia) Daniela Hantuchová (withdrew due to a respiratory virus)
8. (France) Marion Bartoli (second round)
9. (Switzerland) Patty Schnyder (second round)
10. (Russia) Nadia Petrova (first round, retired due to an upset stomach)
11. (Russia) Dinara Safina (third round)
12. (Israel) Shahar Pe'er (third round)
13. (Hungary) Ágnes Szávay (first round)
14. (France) Amélie Mauresmo (second round)
15. (Austria) Sybille Bammer (quarterfinals)
16. (Poland) Agnieszka Radwańska (semifinals)
17. (Italy) Francesca Schiavone (second round)

== Draw ==
=== Key ===
- Q = Qualifier
- WC = Wild card
- LL = Lucky loser
- Alt = Alternate
- SE = Special exempt
- PR = Protected ranking
- ITF = ITF entry
- JE = Junior exempt
- w/o = Walkover
- r = Retired
- d = Defaulted
- SR = Special ranking

=== Finals ===
Quarterfinals
16	(Poland) Agnieszka Radwańska	6	6^{1}	6
(Slovakia) Dominika Cibulková	4	7^{7}	4
4	(Russia) Maria Sharapova	6	6
(Denmark) Caroline Wozniacki	0	1
(China) Li Na	6	6
3	(Serbia) Jelena Janković	3	4
(Russia) Vera Zvonareva	2	6	6
15	(Austria) Sybille Bammer	6	2	0

Semifinals
16	(Poland) Agnieszka Radwańska	4	3
4	(Russia) Maria Sharapova	6	6
(China) Li Na	6	3	3
(Russia) Vera Zvonareva	3	6	6

Final
4	(Russia) Maria Sharapova	6	2	6
(Russia) Vera Zvonareva	1	6	0

=== Top half ===
==== Section 1 ====
First round
(Belarus) O Govortsova	4	7^{7}	3
(India) S Mirza	6	6^{5}	2^{r}
(Italy) T Garbin	6	7
Q	(Poland) U Radwańska	2	5
(Japan) A Morigami	5	0
16	(Poland) A Radwańska	7	6
9	(Switzerland) P Schnyder	6	6
(Austria) T Paszek	4	0
(Czech Republic) L Šafářová	4	3
(Slovakia) D Cibulková	6	6
(Italy) K Knapp	6	6
WC	(Germany) J Görges	1	4

Second round
1	(Serbia) A Ivanovic	6	6
(Belarus) O Govortsova	3	1
(Italy) T Garbin	3	3
16	(Poland) A Radwańska	6	6
9	(Switzerland) P Schnyder	3	4
(Slovakia) D Cibulková	6	6
(Italy) K Knapp	2	3
6	(United States) V Williams	6	6

Third round
1	(Serbia) A Ivanovic
16	(Poland) A Radwańska	w/o
(Slovakia) D Cibulková	6	6
6	(United States) V Williams	3	3

Quarterfinals
16	(Poland) A Radwańska	6	6^{1}	6
(Slovakia) D Cibulková	4	7^{7}	4

==== Section 2 ====
First round
Q	(Russia) G Voskoboeva	6	7^{8}
(Greece) E Daniilidou	1	6^{6}
WC	(Germany) A Kerber	6^{3}	4
Q	(Thailand) T Tanasugarn	7^{7}	6
WC	(Germany) S Lisicki	6^{2}	3
14	(France) A Mauresmo	7^{7}	6
10	(Russia) N Petrova	2	2	r
(Spain) A Medina Garrigues	6	1
(Russia) M Kirilenko	6	5	6
LL	(Russia) E Makarova	3	7	0
(Chinese Taipei) Y-j Chan	6	2	3
(Denmark) C Wozniacki	3	6	6

Second round
4	(Russia) M Sharapova	6	4	6
Q	(Russia) G Voskoboeva	4	6	1
Q	(Thailand) T Tanasugarn	7^{9}	7
14	(France) A Mauresmo	6^{7}	5
(Spain) A Medina Garrigues	2	7	6
(Russia) M Kirilenko	6	5	1
(Denmark) C Wozniacki	6	6
8	(France) M Bartoli	2	3

Third round
4	(Russia) M Sharapova	6	6
Q	(Thailand) T Tanasugarn	2	2
(Spain) A Medina Garrigues	6	6^{3}	3
(Denmark) C Wozniacki	3	7^{7}	6

Quarterfinals
4	(Russia) M Sharapova	6	6
(Denmark) C Wozniacki	0	1

=== Bottom half ===
==== Section 3 ====
First round
(China) N Li	6	0	6
(Russia) E Likhovtseva	1	6	4
Q	(China) T Sun	7^{7}	6^{2}	3
(France) V Razzano	6^{5}	7^{7}	6
LL	(Slovenia) A Klepač	3	4
12	(Israel) S Pe'er	6	6
13	(Hungary) Á Szávay	6^{3}	0
(Japan) A Sugiyama	7^{7}	6
Q	(Japan) A Morita	6	6
(Russia) E Vesnina	3	4
Q	(China) J Zheng	4	6	1
Q	(Russia) Y Shvedova	6	4	6

Second round
5	(Russia) A Chakvetadze	6^{7}	4
(China) N Li	7^{9}	6
(France) V Razzano	1	6^{3}
12	(Israel) S Pe'er	6	7^{7}
(Japan) A Sugiyama	4	6	6
Q	(Japan) A Morita	6	4	0
Q	(Russia) Y Shvedova	1	6	3
3	(Serbia) J Janković	6	3	6

Third round
(China) N Li	6	6
12	(Israel) S Pe'er	1	3
(Japan) A Sugiyama	1	2
3	(Serbia) J Janković	6	6

Quarterfinals
(China) N Li	6	6
3	(Serbia) J Janković	3	4

==== Section 4 ====
First round
(Russia) V Zvonareva	6	6
(Russia) A Rodionova	0	3
(Russia) V Dushevina	3	6	2
(China) Z Yan	6	4	6
(Slovenia) K Srebotnik	2	4
11	(Russia) D Safina	6	6
15	(Austria) S Bammer	6	6
(Japan) A Nakamura	1	3
Q	(Romania) M Niculescu	6	6
LL	(United States) J Ditty	1	4
(France) N Dechy	1	6	6
(China) S Peng	6	4	1

Second round
17	(Italy) F Schiavone	6	3	4
(Russia) V Zvonareva	2	6	6
(China) Z Yan	2	1
11	(Russia) D Safina	6	6
15	(Austria) S Bammer	3	7	6
Q	(Romania) M Niculescu	6	5	4
(France) N Dechy	5	5
2	(Russia) S Kuznetsova	7	7

Third round
(Russia) V Zvonareva	7	6
11	(Russia) D Safina	5	3
15	(Austria) S Bammer	6	7^{10}
2	(Russia) S Kuznetsova	3	6^{8}

Quarterfinals
(Russia) V Zvonareva	2	6	6
15	(Austria) S Bammer	6	2	0
