= 2007 Porsche Tennis Grand Prix – Doubles =

Doubles
- 2007 Porsche Tennis Grand Prix

Final
- Champions: (Czech Republic) Květa Peschke (Australia) Rennae Stubbs
- Runners-up: (Chinese Taipei) Chan Yung-jan (Russia) Dinara Safina
- Score: 6–7^{(7–5)}, 7–6^{(7–4)}, [10–2]

Details
- Draw: 16
- Seeds: 4

Events
Singles	Doubles
← 2006 ·	Porsche Tennis Grand Prix	· 2008 →

The doubles Tournament at the 2007 Porsche Tennis Grand Prix took place between 1 and 7 October on the indoor hard courts of the Porsche-Arena in Stuttgart, Germany. Květa Peschke and Rennae Stubbs won the title, defeating Chan Yung-jan and Dinara Safina in the final.

== Seeds ==
1. (Czech Republic) Květa Peschke / (Australia) Rennae Stubbs (champions)
2. (Chinese Taipei) Chan Yung-jan / (Russia) Dinara Safina (final)
3. (Italy) Francesca Schiavone / (Slovenia) Katarina Srebotnik (quarterfinals)
4. (Slovakia) Janette Husárová / (Israel) Shahar Pe'er (first round)

== Draw ==
=== Key ===
- Q = Qualifier
- WC = Wild card
- LL = Lucky loser
- Alt = Alternate
- ITF = ITF entry
- PR = Protected ranking
- SR = Special ranking
- SE = Special exempt
- JE = Junior exempt
- JR = Junior Accelerator Programme entrant
- CO = College Accelerator Programme entrant
- NG = Next Gen Accelerator Program entrant
- w/o = Walkover
- r = Retired
- d = Defaulted

First round
1	(Czech Republic) K Peschke (Australia) R Stubbs	7	6
WC	(Germany) J Görges (Germany) T Malek	6^{5}	4
(Switzerland) E Gagliardi (Australia) N Pratt	0	1
(Netherlands) M Krajicek (Czech Republic) V Uhlířová	6	6
3	(Italy) F Schiavone (Slovenia) K Srebotnik	6	6
(Greece) E Daniilidou (Germany) J Wöhr	3	2
(Romania) A Ehritt-Vanc (Bosnia and Herzegovina) M Jugić-Salkić	4	6	8
(Germany) M Müller (Czech Republic) G Navrátilová	6	0	10
(Italy) ME Camerin (Argentina) G Dulko	6	6
(France) S Foretz (Tunisia) S Sfar	3	3
(Poland) A Radwańska (Czech Republic) B Záhlavová-Strýcová	6	2	10
4	(Slovakia) J Husárová (Israel) S Pe'er	3	6	5
(Ukraine) A Bondarenko (Ukraine) K Bondarenko	6	7
(Germany) V Henke (Czech Republic) A Hlaváčková	2	6^{2}
(Poland) K Jans (Poland) A Rosolska	2	4
2	(Chinese Taipei) Y-j Chan (Russia) D Safina	6	6

Quarterfinals
1	(Czech Republic) K Peschke (Australia) R Stubbs	6	6
(Netherlands) M Krajicek (Czech Republic) V Uhlířová	4	3
3	(Italy) F Schiavone (Slovenia) K Srebotnik
(Germany) M Müller (Czech Republic) G Navrátilová	w/o
(Italy) ME Camerin (Argentina) G Dulko	7	6
(Poland) A Radwańska (Czech Republic) B Záhlavová-Strýcová	6^{4}	4
(Ukraine) A Bondarenko (Ukraine) K Bondarenko	4	2
2	(Chinese Taipei) Y-j Chan (Russia) D Safina	6	6

Semifinals
1	(Czech Republic) K Peschke (Australia) R Stubbs	6	6
(Germany) M Müller (Czech Republic) G Navrátilová	2	1
(Italy) ME Camerin (Argentina) G Dulko	3	4
2	(Chinese Taipei) Y-j Chan (Russia) D Safina	6	6

Final
1	(Czech Republic) K Peschke (Australia) R Stubbs	6^{5}	7	[10]
2	(Chinese Taipei) Y-j Chan (Russia) D Safina	7	6^{4}	[2]
