= 2007 Qatar Ladies Open =

- Date: 26 February – 4 March
- Edition: 7th
- Surface: Hard / outdoor
- Location: Doha, Qatar
- Venue: Khalifa International Tennis and Squash Complex

Champions

Singles
- (Belgium) Justine Henin

Doubles
- (Switzerland) Martina Hingis / (Russia) Maria Kirilenko
- Qatar Ladies Open

The 2007 Qatar Ladies Open, known as the 2007 Qatar Total Open, for sponsorship reasons, was a tennis tournament played on outdoor hard courts. It was the 7th edition of the Qatar Total Open, and was part of the Tier II Series of the 2007 WTA Tour. It took place at the Khalifa International Tennis and Squash Complex in Doha, Qatar, from 26 February through 4 March 2007.

== Finals ==
=== Singles ===
(Belgium) Justine Henin defeated (Russia) Svetlana Kuznetsova, 6–4, 6–2

=== Doubles ===
(Switzerland) Martina Hingis / (Russia) Maria Kirilenko defeated (Hungary) Ágnes Szávay / (Czech Republic) Vladimíra Uhlířová, 6–1, 6–1
