= 2007 Dubai Tennis Championships – Men's doubles =

Men's doubles
- 2007 Dubai Tennis Championships

Final
- Champions: (France) Fabrice Santoro (Serbia) Nenad Zimonjić
- Runners-up: (India) Mahesh Bhupathi (Czech Republic) Radek Štěpánek
- Score: 7–5, 6–7^{(3–7)}, [10–7]

Details
- Draw: 16
- Seeds: 4

Events
Singles	men	women
Doubles	men	women
← 2006 ·	Dubai Tennis Championships	· 2008 →

Fabrice Santoro and Nenad Zimonjić defeated Mahesh Bhupathi and Radek Štěpánek to win men's doubles at the 2007 Dubai Tennis Championships.

== Seeds ==
1. (The Bahamas) Mark Knowles / (Canada) Daniel Nestor (semifinals)
2. (Australia) Paul Hanley / (Zimbabwe) Kevin Ullyett (semifinals)
3. (Czech Republic) Martin Damm / (India) Leander Paes (first round)
4. (France) Fabrice Santoro / (Serbia) Nenad Zimonjić (champions)

== Draw ==
=== Key ===
- Q = Qualifier
- WC = Wild card
- LL = Lucky loser
- Alt = Alternate
- SE = Special exempt
- PR = Protected ranking
- ITF = ITF entry
- JE = Junior exempt
- w/o = Walkover
- r = Retired
- d = Defaulted
- SR = Special ranking

=== Draw ===
First round
1	(The Bahamas) M Knowles (Canada) D Nestor	6	6^{8}	[10]
WC	(India) R Boppana (Morocco) Y El Aynaoui	2	7^{10}	[2]
(Russia) I Andreev (Spain) D Ferrer	5	4
(Cyprus) M Baghdatis (France) G Simon	7	6
(France) F Santoro (Serbia) N Zimonjić	6	7
(Sweden) J Björkman (Germany) T Haas	2	5
(Russia) N Davydenko (Russia) M Youzhny	7^{7}	4	[5]
(Switzerland) Y Allegro (Switzerland) R Federer	6^{4}	6	[10]
(India) M Bhupathi (Czech Republic) R Štěpánek	6	6
(Slovakia) D Hrbatý (Finland) J Nieminen	0	3
(Czech Republic) T Berdych (Czech Republic) P Pála	6	6
4	(India) L Paes (Czech Republic) M Damm	3	4
(Belgium) O Rochus (Belgium) K Vliegen	6	6
WC	(United Arab Emirates) O Bahrouzyan (United Arab Emirates) N Mohammed	2	1
(South Africa) J Coetzee (Netherlands) R Wassen	7	4	[4]
2	(Australia) P Hanley (Zimbabwe) K Ullyett	5	6	[10]

Quarterfinals
1	(The Bahamas) M Knowles (Canada) D Nestor	6	6
(Cyprus) M Baghdatis (France) G Simon	3	2
4	(France) F Santoro (Serbia) N Zimonjić	6	6
(Switzerland) Y Allegro (Switzerland) R Federer	4	4
(India) M Bhupathi (Czech Republic) R Štěpánek	6	6
(Czech Republic) T Berdych (Czech Republic) P Pála	3	4
(Belgium) O Rochus (Belgium) K Vliegen	2	4
2	(Australia) P Hanley (Zimbabwe) K Ullyett	6	6

Semifinals
1	(The Bahamas) M Knowles (Canada) D Nestor	3	6	[8]
4	(France) F Santoro (Serbia) N Zimonjić	6	2	[10]
(India) M Bhupathi (Czech Republic) R Štěpánek	4	6	[10]
2	(Australia) P Hanley (Zimbabwe) K Ullyett	6	3	[8]

Finals
4	(France) F Santoro (Serbia) N Zimonjić	7	6^{3}	[10]
(India) M Bhupathi (Czech Republic) R Štěpánek	5	7^{7}	[7]
