= 2007 Dubai Tennis Championships – Men's singles =

Men's singles
- 2007 Dubai Tennis Championships

Final
- Champion: (Switzerland) Roger Federer
- Runner-up: (Russia) Mikhail Youzhny
- Score: 6–4, 6–3

Details
- Draw: 32 (4Q / 3WC)
- Seeds: 8

Events
Singles	men	women
Doubles	men	women
- Dubai Tennis Championships

First-seeded Roger Federer defeated Mikhail Youzhny 6–4, 6–3 to win the 2007 Dubai Tennis Championships singles event.

Rafael Nadal was the defending champion, but lost to Youzhny in the quarterfinals.

== Seeds ==
1. (Switzerland) Roger Federer (champion)
2. (Spain) Rafael Nadal (quarterfinals)
3. (Russia) Nikolay Davydenko (second round)
4. (Spain) Tommy Robredo (first round)
5. (Germany) Tommy Haas (semifinals)
6. (Czech Republic) Tomáš Berdych (second round)
7. (Serbia) Novak Djokovic (quarterfinals)
8. (Spain) David Ferrer (first round)

== Draw ==
Key

- Q = Qualifier
- WC = Wild card
- LL = Lucky loser
- Alt = Alternate
- ITF = ITF entry
- PR = Protected ranking
- SR = Special ranking
- SE = Special exempt
- JE = Junior exempt
- JR = Junior Accelerator Programme entrant
- CO = College Accelerator Programme entrant
- NG = Next Gen Accelerator Program entrant
- w/o = Walkover
- r = Retired
- d = Defaulted

=== Finals ===
Semifinals
1	(Switzerland) Roger Federer	6	7
5	(Germany) Tommy Haas	4	5
(Sweden) Robin Söderling	5	2
(Russia) Mikhail Youzhny	7	6

Final
1	(Switzerland) Roger Federer	6	6
(Russia) Mikhail Youzhny	4	3

=== Section 1 ===
First round
1	(Switzerland) R Federer	7^{7}	3	6
(Denmark) K Pless	6^{2}	6	3
Q	(Austria) O Marach	4	3
(Italy) D Bracciali	6	6
Q	(Italy) A Seppi	0	6^{5}
Q	(Germany) R Schüttler	6	7^{7}
(Belgium) K Vliegen	6	4	3
7	(Serbia) N Djokovic	4	6	6
3	(Russia) N Davydenko	6^{2}	7	7
Q	(Morocco) Y El Aynaoui	7^{7}	5	5
(South Korea) L Hyung-Taik	6^{4}	2
(Belgium) O Rochus	7^{7}	6
(France) F Serra	5	6	6
(Sweden) J Björkman	7	3	2
WC	(Czech Republic) R Štěpánek	4	3
5	(Germany) T Haas	6	6

Second round
1	(Switzerland) R Federer	7	6
(Italy) D Bracciali	5	3
Q	(Germany) R Schüttler	6^{5}	3
7	(Serbia) N Djokovic	7^{7}	6
3	(Russia) N Davydenko	6	4	2
(Belgium) O Rochus	4	6	6
(France) F Serra	6^{5}	3
5	(Germany) T Haas	7^{7}	6

Quarterfinals
1	(Switzerland) R Federer	6	6^{6}	6
7	(Serbia) N Djokovic	3	7^{8}	3
(Belgium) O Rochus	0	2
5	(Germany) T Haas	6	6

Semifinals
1	(Switzerland) R Federer	6	7
5	(Germany) T Haas	4	5

=== Section 2 ===
First round
8	(Spain) D Ferrer	6^{13}	1
(Sweden) R Söderling	7^{15}	6
WC	(United Arab Emirates) O Bahrouzyan	1	2
(Slovakia) D Hrbatý	6	6
(Germany) P Kohlschreiber	4	4
(France) G Simon	6	6
(France) F Santoro	7^{8}	6
4	(Spain) T Robredo	6^{6}	4
6	(Czech Republic) T Berdych	3	6	6
WC	(Kuwait) M Ghareeb	6	3	2
(Russia) M Youzhny	3	6	6
(Finland) J Nieminen	6	3	3
(Russia) I Andreev	6^{4}	6	7
(France) M Gicquel	7^{7}	4	5
(Cyprus) M Baghdatis	6	2	3
2	(Spain) R Nadal	3	6	6

Second round
(Sweden) R Söderling	6	7
(Slovakia) D Hrbatý	3	5
(France) G Simon	4	2
(France) F Santoro	6	6
6	(Czech Republic) T Berdych	6^{6}	3
(Russia) M Youzhny	7^{8}	6
(Russia) I Andreev	2	6	6^{2}
2	(Spain) R Nadal	6	3	7^{7}

Quarterfinals
(Sweden) R Söderling	6	6^{2}	6
(France) F Santoro	1	7^{7}	0
(Russia) M Youzhny	7^{7}	6
2	(Spain) R Nadal	6^{5}	3

Semifinals
(Sweden) R Söderling	5	2
(Russia) M Youzhny	7	6
