= 2007 WTA Tour Championships – Singles =

Singles
- 2007 WTA Tour Championships

Final
- Champion: (Belgium) Justine Henin
- Runner-up: (Russia) Maria Sharapova
- Score: 5–7, 7–5, 6–3

Details
- Draw: 8 (RR + elimination)
- Seeds: 8

Events
Singles	Doubles
- WTA Tour Championships

Defending champion Justine Henin defeated Maria Sharapova in the final, 5–7, 7–5, 6–3 to win the singles tennis title at the 2007 WTA Tour Championships. The final lasted 3 hours and 23 minutes, the longest best-of-three-sets final in WTA Tour history.

Jelena Janković, Ana Ivanovic, Anna Chakvetadze and Marion Bartoli (as an alternate replacing Serena Williams) made their debuts at the event.

== Seeds ==
1. (Belgium) Justine Henin (champion)
2. (Russia) Svetlana Kuznetsova (round robin)
3. (Serbia) Jelena Janković (round robin)
4. (Serbia) Ana Ivanovic (semifinals)
5. (United States) Serena Williams (round robin, withdrew due to left patella femoral inflammation)
6. (Russia) Maria Sharapova (final)
7. (Russia) Anna Chakvetadze (semifinals)
8. (Slovakia) Daniela Hantuchová (round robin)

Notes:

- (United States) Venus Williams had qualified but pulled out due to severe dizziness

== Alternates ==
1. (France) Marion Bartoli (replaced S.Williams) (round robin)
2. (Russia) Elena Dementieva (not used)

== Draw ==
Key

- Q = Qualifier
- WC = Wild card
- LL = Lucky loser
- Alt = Alternate
- ITF = ITF entry
- PR = Protected ranking
- SR = Special ranking
- SE = Special exempt
- JE = Junior exempt
- JR = Junior Accelerator Programme entrant
- CO = College Accelerator Programme entrant
- NG = Next Gen Accelerator Program entrant
- w/o = Walkover
- r = Retired
- d = Defaulted

=== Finals ===
Semifinals
1	(Belgium) Justine Henin	6	6
4	(Serbia) Ana Ivanovic	4	4
7	(Russia) Anna Chakvetadze	2	2
6	(Russia) Maria Sharapova	6	6

Final
1	(Belgium) Justine Henin	5	7	6
6	(Russia) Maria Sharapova	7	5	3

=== Yellow group ===
		(Belgium) Henin	(Serbia) Janković	(United States) Williams^{1} (France) Bartoli	(Russia) Chakvetadze	RR; W–L	Set; W–L	Game; W–L	Standings
1	(Belgium) Justine Henin		6–2, 6–2	6–0, 6–0^{2} (w/ Bartoli)	6–1, 7–6^{(7–4)}	3–0	6–0 (100%)	37–11 (77%)	1
3	(Serbia) Jelena Janković	2–6, 2–6		1–6, 0–1 ret. (w/ Bartoli)	4–6, 6–0, 3–6	0–3	1–6 (14%)	18–31 (37%)	4
5 Alt	(United States) Serena Williams^{1} (France) Marion Bartoli	0–6, 0–6 (w/ Bartoli)	6–1, 1–0 ret. (w/ Bartoli)		4–6, ret. (w/ Williams)	0–1; 1–1	0–2 (0%); 2–2 (50%)	4–6 (40%); 7–13 (35%)	5; 3
7	(Russia) Anna Chakvetadze	1–6, 6–7^{(4–7)}	6–4, 0–6, 6–3	6–4, ret. (w/ Williams)		2–1	4–3 (57%)	25–30 (45%)	2

Standings are determined by: 1. number of wins; 2. number of matches; 3. in two-players-ties, head-to-head records; 4. in three-players-ties, percentage of sets won, or of games won; 5. steering-committee decision.

^{1} Serena Williams withdrew from the tournament after her first match (left patella femoral inflammation).

^{2} Bartoli's 6–0, 6–0 loss was the heaviest defeat in the tournament's history, and the only double bagel.

=== Red group ===
		(Russia) Kuznetsova	(Serbia) Ivanovic	(Russia) Sharapova	(Slovakia) Hantuchová	RR; W–L	Set; W–L	Game; W–L	Standings
2	(Russia) Svetlana Kuznetsova		1–6, 6–4, 5–7	7–5, 2–6, 2–6	6–7^{(7–9)}, 0–6	0–3	2–6 (25%)	29–47 (38%)	4
4	(Serbia) Ana Ivanovic	6–1, 4–6, 7–5		1–6, 2–6	6–2, 7–6^{(11–9)}	2–1	4–3 (57%)	33–32 (51%)	2
6	(Russia) Maria Sharapova	5–7, 6–2, 6–2	6–1, 6–2		6–4, 7–5	3–0	6–1 (86%)	44–23 (66%)	1
8	(Slovakia) Daniela Hantuchová	7–6^{(9–7)}, 6–0	2–6, 6–7^{(9–11)}	4–6, 5–7		1–2	2–4 (33%)	30–32 (48%)	3

Standings are determined by: 1. number of wins; 2. number of matches; 3. in two-players-ties, head-to-head records; 4. in three-players-ties, percentage of sets won, or of games won; 5. steering-committee decision.

== See also ==
- WTA Tour Championships appearances
