= 2007 Porsche Tennis Grand Prix =

- Date: 1–7 October
- Edition: 30th
- Category: Tier II Series
- Draw: 28S / 16D
- Prize money: $650,000
- Surface: Hard / Indoor
- Location: Stuttgart, Germany
- Venue: Porsche Arena

Champions

Singles
- (Belgium) Justine Henin

Doubles
- (Czech Republic) Květa Peschke / (Australia) Rennae Stubbs
← 2006 ·	Porsche Tennis Grand Prix	· 2008 →

The 2007 Porsche Tennis Grand Prix was a women's tennis tournament played on indoor hard courts. It was the 30th year of Porsche Tennis Grand Prix, and was part of the Tier II Series of the 2007 WTA Tour. It took place at the Porsche Arena in Stuttgart, Germany, from 1 October through 7 October 2007. First-seeded Justine Henin won the singles title.

== Finals ==
=== Singles ===
(Belgium) Justine Henin defeated (France) Tatiana Golovin, 2–6, 6–2, 6–1

=== Doubles ===
(Czech Republic) Květa Peschke / (Australia) Rennae Stubbs defeated (Chinese Taipei) Yung-Jan Chan / (Russia) Dinara Safina, 6–7^{(5–7)}, 7–6^{(7–4)}, [10–2]
