= 2007 Dubai Tennis Championships – Women's singles =

Women's singles
- 2007 Dubai Tennis Championships

Final
- Champion: (Belgium) Justine Henin
- Runner-up: (France) Amélie Mauresmo
- Score: 6–4, 7–5

Details
- Draw: 28
- Seeds: 8

Events
Singles	men	women
Doubles	men	women
- Dubai Tennis Championships

Justine Henin defended her title, beating Amélie Mauresmo in the final, 6–4, 7–5.

== Seeds ==
The top four seeds receive a bye into the second round.

1. (Belgium) Justine Henin (champion)
2. (France) Amélie Mauresmo (final)
3. (Russia) Svetlana Kuznetsova (semifinals)
4. (Switzerland) Martina Hingis (quarterfinals)
5. (Serbia) Jelena Janković (semifinals)
6. (Switzerland) Patty Schnyder (quarterfinals)
7. (China) Li Na (first round)
8. (Slovakia) Daniela Hantuchová (quarterfinals)

== Draw ==
=== Key ===
- WC – Wildcard
- Q – Qualifier
- r – Retired

=== Finals ===
Semifinals
1	(Belgium) Justine Henin	1	6	6
3	(Russia) Svetlana Kuznetsova	6	4	0
5	(Serbia) Jelena Janković	2	0^{r}
2	(France) Amélie Mauresmo	6	0

Finals
1	(Belgium) Justine Henin	6	7
2	(France) Amélie Mauresmo	4	5

=== Section 1 ===
First round
Q	(Austria) T Paszek	7	6
(Slovenia) K Srebotnik	5	3
WC	(Tunisia) S Sfar	4	7	3
(Japan) A Sugiyama	6	5	6
(Greece) E Daniilidou	6^{5}	7^{7}	6
7	(China) Li N	7^{7}	6^{5}	3
(United States) M Shaughnessy	6	6
Q	(Switzerland) E Gagliardi	3	4
(Germany) AL Grönefeld	3	4
(Australia) A Molik	6	6
(Italy) F Schiavone	7^{7}	3	3
6	(Switzerland) P Schnyder	6^{5}	6	6

Second round
1	(Belgium) J Henin	4	7	6
Q	(Austria) T Paszek	6	5	1
(Japan) A Sugiyama	7	1	5
(Greece) E Daniilidou	5	6	7
3	(Russia) S Kuznetsova	6	7^{7}
(United States) M Shaughnessy	1	6^{4}
(Australia) A Molik	6	2	4
6	(Switzerland) P Schnyder	4	6	6

Quarterfinals
1	(Belgium) J Henin	6	6
(Greece) E Daniilidou	0	2
3	(Russia) S Kuznetsova	6	6
6	(Switzerland) P Schnyder	3	4

Semifinals
1	(Belgium) J Henin	1	6	6
3	(Russia) S Kuznetsova	6	4	0

=== Section 2 ===
First round
5	(Serbia) J Janković	6	6
(France) A Rezaï	1	2
(Italy) M Santangelo	6	7^{7}
(Germany) M Müller	3	6^{4}
(Spain) A Medina Garrigues	6	6
Q	(Luxembourg) A Kremer	3	4
8	(Slovakia) D Hantuchová	6	6
(Russia) E Vesnina	1	3
WC	(Romania) M Niculescu	3	0
(Russia) M Kirilenko	6	6
(Russia) E Likhovtseva	2	0^{r}
Q	(Russia) V Dushevina	6	0

Second round
5	(Serbia) J Janković	6	7
(Italy) M Santangelo	3	5
(Spain) A Medina Garrigues	7	3	4
4	(Switzerland) M Hingis	5	6	6
8	(Slovakia) D Hantuchová	2	6	7^{7}
(Russia) M Kirilenko	6	4	6^{4}
Q	(Russia) V Dushevina	2	2
2	(France) A Mauresmo	6	6

Quarterfinals
5	(Serbia) J Janković	7^{7}	6
4	(Switzerland) M Hingis	6^{3}	2
8	(Slovakia) D Hantuchová	3	6	4
2	(France) A Mauresmo	6	3	6

Semifinals
5	(Serbia) J Janković	2	0^{r}
2	(France) A Mauresmo	6	0
