= 2007 Porsche Tennis Grand Prix – Singles =

Singles
- 2007 Porsche Tennis Grand Prix

Final
- Champion: (Belgium) Justine Henin
- Runner-up: (France) Tatiana Golovin
- Score: 2–6, 6–2, 6–1

Details
- Draw: 28
- Seeds: 8

Events
Singles	Doubles
- Porsche Tennis Grand Prix

Nadia Petrova was the defending champion, but retired in the quarterfinals against Jelena Janković.

Justine Henin won the title, defeating Tatiana Golovin in the final 2–6, 6–2, 6–1.

== Seeds ==
1. (Belgium) Justine Henin (champion)
2. (Russia) Svetlana Kuznetsova (semifinals)
3. (Serbia) Jelena Janković (semifinals)
4. (Russia) Anna Chakvetadze (second round)
5. (Serbia) Ana Ivanovic (second round)
6. (United States) Serena Williams (quarterfinals)
7. (Russia) Nadia Petrova (quarterfinals)
8. (Slovakia) Daniela Hantuchová (second round)

== Draw ==
Key

- Q = Qualifier
- WC = Wild card
- LL = Lucky loser
- Alt = Alternate
- ITF = ITF entry
- PR = Protected ranking
- SR = Special ranking
- SE = Special exempt
- JE = Junior exempt
- JR = Junior Accelerator Programme entrant
- CO = College Accelerator Programme entrant
- NG = Next Gen Accelerator Program entrant
- w/o = Walkover
- r = Retired
- d = Defaulted

=== Finals ===
Semifinals
1	(Belgium) Justine Henin	7	7
3	(Serbia) Jelena Janković	6^{2}	5
(France) Tatiana Golovin	6	6
2	(Russia) Svetlana Kuznetsova	2	4

Final
1	(Belgium) Justine Henin	2	6	6
(France) Tatiana Golovin	6	2	1

=== Top half ===
First round
(Slovenia) K Srebotnik	7	2	4
(Russia) D Safina	5	6	6
(France) A Mauresmo	2	5
(Russia) E Dementieva	6	7
(Czech Republic) L Šafářová	1	3
8	(Slovakia) D Hantuchová	6	6
(Italy) F Schiavone	1	6^{6}
(Israel) S Pe'er	6	7
(Ukraine) A Bondarenko	3	2
Q	(Netherlands) M Krajicek	6	6
WC	(Germany) T Malek	6	1	1
7	(Russia) N Petrova	2	6	6

Second round
1	(Belgium) J Henin	6	6
(Russia) D Safina	4	1
(Russia) E Dementieva	6	6
8	(Slovakia) D Hantuchová	4	4
3	(Serbia) J Janković	4	6	6
(Israel) S Pe'er	6	1	3
Q	(Netherlands) M Krajicek	1	3
7	(Russia) N Petrova	6	6

Quarterfinals
1	(Belgium) J Henin	6	6
(Russia) E Dementieva	4	4
3	(Serbia) J Janković	6^{5}	5
7	(Russia) N Petrova	7	1	r

Semifinals
1	(Belgium) J Henin	7	7
3	(Serbia) J Janković	6^{2}	5

=== Bottom half ===
First round
5	(Serbia) A Ivanovic	6	6
(Switzerland) P Schnyder	0	2
Q	(Italy) K Knapp	5	0
Q	(Ukraine) K Bondarenko	7	6
WC	(Germany) M Müller	1	1
(France) T Golovin	6	6
6	(United States) S Williams	6	6
LL	(Czech Republic) Z Ondrášková	0	0
Q	(Ukraine) J Vakulenko	6	6
WC	(Germany) J Görges	4	4
(France) M Bartoli	6	2	1
(Poland) A Radwańska	0	6	6

Second round
5	(Serbia) A Ivanovic	2	6	3
Q	(Ukraine) K Bondarenko	6	1	6
(France) T Golovin	7	6
4	(Russia) A Chakvetadze	6^{3}	1
6	(United States) S Williams	7	6
Q	(Ukraine) J Vakulenko	5	2
(Poland) A Radwańska	4	7	3
2	(Russia) S Kuznetsova	6	6^{5}	6

Quarterfinals
Q	(Ukraine) K Bondarenko	3	4
(France) T Golovin	6	6
6	(United States) S Williams	3	3
2	(Russia) S Kuznetsova	6	6

Semifinals
(France) T Golovin	6	6
2	(Russia) S Kuznetsova	2	4
