= 2007 Qatar Ladies Open – Singles =

Singles
- 2007 Qatar Ladies Open

Final
- Champion: (Belgium) Justine Henin
- Runner-up: (Russia) Svetlana Kuznetsova
- Score: 6–4, 6–2

Details
- Draw: 28
- Seeds: 8

Events
Singles	Doubles
← 2006 ·	Qatar Ladies Open	· 2008 →

Maria Sharapova was the defending champion, but chose not to participate that year.

== Seeds ==
The top four seeds receive a bye into the second round.

1. (Belgium) Justine Henin (champion)
2. (Russia) Svetlana Kuznetsova (final)
3. (Switzerland) Martina Hingis (quarterfinals)
4. (Serbia) Jelena Janković (semifinals)
5. (Switzerland) Patty Schnyder (quarterfinals)
6. (Slovakia) Daniela Hantuchová (semifinals)
7. (Germany) Anna-Lena Grönefeld (first round)
8. (Italy) Francesca Schiavone (quarterfinals)

== Draw ==
=== Key ===
- Q = Qualifier
- WC = Wild card
- LL = Lucky loser
- Alt = Alternate
- ITF = ITF entry
- PR = Protected ranking
- SR = Special ranking
- SE = Special exempt
- JE = Junior exempt
- JR = Junior Accelerator Programme entrant
- CO = College Accelerator Programme entrant
- NG = Next Gen Accelerator Program entrant
- w/o = Walkover
- r = Retired
- d = Defaulted

=== Finals ===
Semifinals
1	(Belgium) Justine Henin	6^{5}	6	6
4	(Serbia) Jelena Janković	7^{7}	2	4
6	(Slovakia) Daniela Hantuchová	4	2
2	(Russia) Svetlana Kuznetsova	6	6

Final
1	(Belgium) Justine Henin	6	6
2	(Russia) Svetlana Kuznetsova	4	2

=== Top half ===
First round
(Japan) A Sugiyama	6	2	1^{r}
(Australia) A Molik	0	6	3
(Spain) A Medina Garrigues	3	6	6
(United States) M Shaughnessy	6	3	2
(France) A Rezaï	2	6	2
5	(Switzerland) P Schnyder	6	2	6
(Italy) ME Camerin	6	6
(Ukraine) A Bondarenko	3	4
(Italy) R Oprandi	4	3
(India) S Mirza	6	6
Q	(Ukraine) K Bondarenko	7	4	6
7	(Germany) A-L Grönefeld	5	6	3

Second round
1	(Belgium) J Henin	6	7^{11}
(Australia) A Molik	2	6^{9}
(Spain) A Medina Garrigues	3	4
5	(Switzerland) P Schnyder	6	6
4	(Serbia) J Janković	6	6
(Italy) ME Camerin	0	1
(India) S Mirza
Q	(Ukraine) K Bondarenko	w/o

Quarterfinals
1	(Belgium) J Henin	3	6	7
5	(Switzerland) P Schnyder	6	4	5
4	(Serbia) J Janković	6	6
Q	(Ukraine) K Bondarenko	3	3

Semifinals
1	(Belgium) J Henin	6^{5}	6	6
4	(Serbia) J Janković	7^{7}	2	4

=== Bottom half ===
First round
6	(Slovakia) D Hantuchová	6	6
(Colombia) C Castaño	1	0
WC	(Tunisia) S Sfar	0	3
(Greece) E Daniilidou	6	6
(Russia) M Kirilenko	6	6
Q	(Luxembourg) A Kremer	1	2
8	(Italy) F Schiavone	6	6
(Bulgaria) T Pironkova	2	4
(Italy) M Santangelo	6	7^{7}
WC	(Germany) S Klösel	3	6^{4}
Q	(Hungary) Á Szávay	2	3
Q	(Germany) J Görges	6	6

Second round
6	(Slovakia) D Hantuchová	6^{4}	6	6
(Greece) E Daniilidou	7^{7}	3	3
(Russia) M Kirilenko	2	2
3	(Switzerland) M Hingis	6	6
8	(Italy) F Schiavone	4	7^{8}	1
(Italy) M Santangelo	6	6^{6}	0^{r}
Q	(Germany) J Görges	5	1
2	(Russia) S Kuznetsova	7	6

Quarterfinals
6	(Slovakia) D Hantuchová	1	6	6
3	(Switzerland) M Hingis	6	4	4
8	(Italy) F Schiavone	3	4
2	(Russia) S Kuznetsova	6	6

Semifinals
6	(Slovakia) D Hantuchová	4	2
2	(Russia) S Kuznetsova	6	6
