= Cara Black =

Zimbabwean tennis player (born 1979)

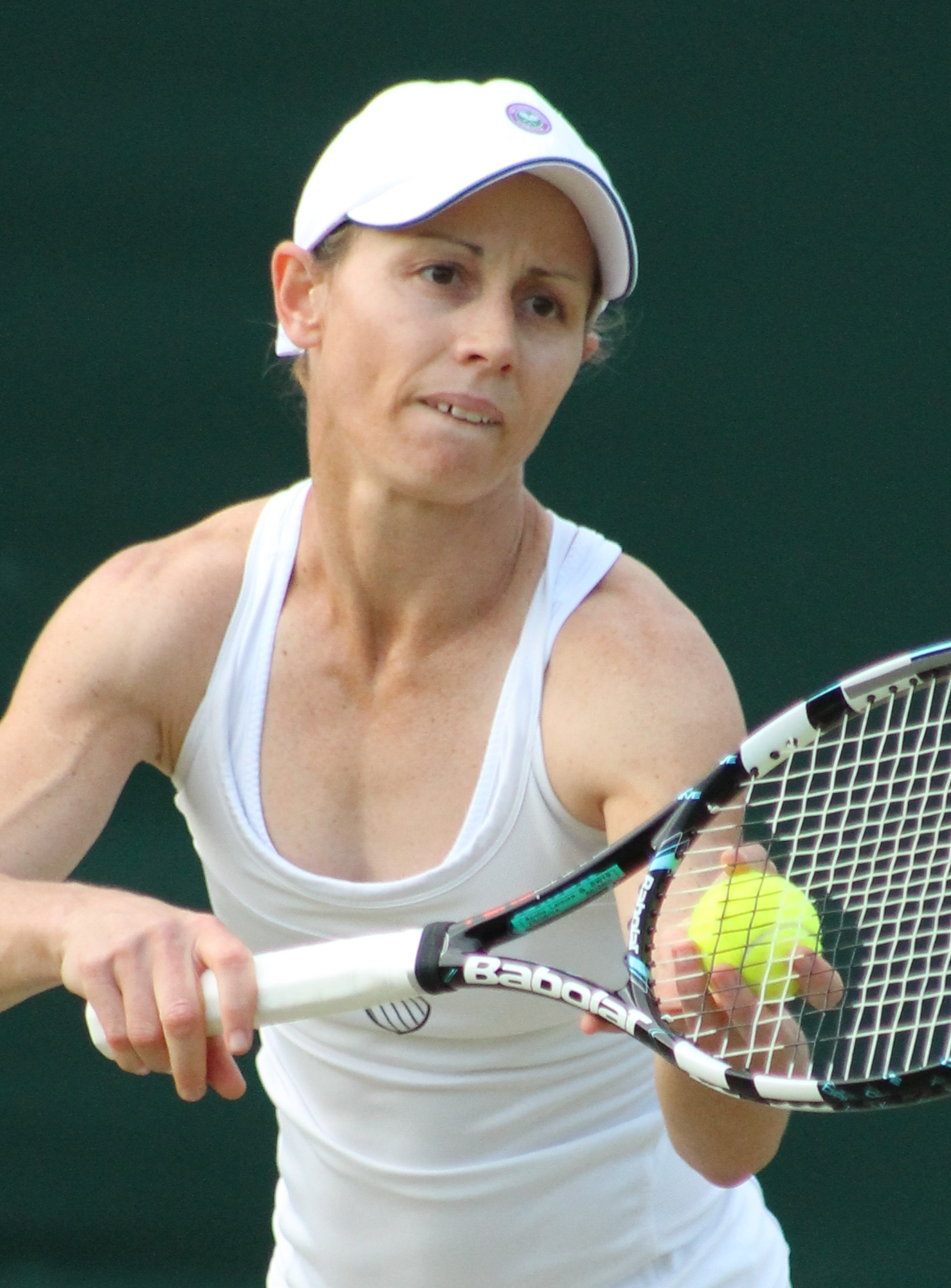
- Black at the 2014 Wimbledon Championships
- Country (sports): Zimbabwe
- Residence: London, England
- Born: 17 February 1979 (age 47) Harare, Zimbabwe
- Height: 5 ft 6 in (1.68 m)
- Turned pro: 1998
- Retired: 2015
- Plays: Right-handed (two-handed backhand)
- Prize money: US$7,730,800

Singles
- Career record: 312–241
- Career titles: 1 WTA, 6 ITF
- Highest ranking: No. 31 (15 March 1999)

Grand Slam singles results
- Australian Open: 2R (2000, 2001, 2002, 2004)
- French Open: 4R (2001)
- Wimbledon: 3R (1998, 2003, 2005)
- US Open: 2R (1998, 2002, 2004)

Other tournaments
- Olympic Games: 2R (2004)

Doubles
- Career record: 750–305
- Career titles: 60 WTA, 11 ITF
- Highest ranking: No. 1 (17 October 2005)

Grand Slam doubles results
- Australian Open: W (2007)
- French Open: F (2005)
- Wimbledon: W (2004, 2005, 2007)
- US Open: W (2008)

Other doubles tournaments
- Tour Finals: W (2007, 2008, 2014)

Mixed doubles
- Career record: 88–48
- Career titles: 5

Grand Slam mixed doubles results
- Australian Open: W (2010)
- French Open: W (2002)
- Wimbledon: W (2004, 2010)
- US Open: W (2008)

Cara Cavell Black (born 17 February 1979) is a Zimbabwean former professional tennis player. Black was primarily a doubles specialist, winning 60 WTA Tour and 11 ITF doubles titles. A former doubles world No. 1, she won ten major titles. By winning the 2010 Australian Open mixed doubles title, Black became the third woman in the Open Era to complete the career Grand Slam in mixed doubles (after Martina Navratilova and Daniela Hantuchová). Having also won one singles title on the WTA Tour, Black peaked at world No. 31 in the singles rankings in March 1999.

== Personal life ==
Black was born in Salisbury, Rhodesia (now Harare, Zimbabwe) to Donald and Velia Black. Her father and older brothers, Wayne and Byron Black, were all professional tennis players themselves. The siblings all competed mostly in doubles – Wayne was the 2001 US Open and 2005 Australian Open champion and Byron was the 1994 French Open winner and reached the number one position on the world rankings.

Black partnered with her brother Wayne to win the 2002 French Open and 2004 Wimbledon Championships mixed-doubles events. Black has also engaged in long-term partnerships with Irina Selyutina, Elena Likhovtseva, Rennae Stubbs, Liezel Huber, and most recently Sania Mirza.

In August 2005, Black announced that she would marry her longtime boyfriend, Australian mental and fitness trainer Brett Stephens. The couple's son was born in 2012 following her break from tennis after Wimbledon 2011.

== Career ==
=== 1996–2010 ===
Cara has won five Grand Slam women's doubles titles in her career: Wimbledon 2004, 2005, and 2007; Australian Open 2007; and US Open 2008. She reached the 2000 US Open doubles final with Elena Likhovtseva. She has also won five Grand Slam mixed doubles titles, two of them partnering with her brother Wayne: the 2002 French Open and the 2004 Wimbledon Championships (they reached the final of the 2004 French Open and the semifinals of the 2003 French Open and 2003 US Open). She won three further titles in partnership with Leander Paes: the 2008 US Open, the 2010 Australian Open and the 2010 Wimbledon Championships.

From 1996 through to 2000, Black's debut years, she won 8 ITF doubles titles, 1 WTA doubles title in Auckland, and 4 ITF singles titles.

Her only WTA singles title came at Waikoloa in 2002. She also won a big ITF doubles tournament in Santa Clara in 1999. In November 2005, Black was runner-up in the WTA Championships doubles title. Australian Samantha Stosur and American Lisa Raymond defeated Australian Rennae Stubbs and Black 6–7 (5–7), 7–5, 6–4.

In 2007, Black came back to partner Liezel Huber. They won the 2007 Australian Open and Wimbledon. The team ended the year as the number one team, winning the year-end championships over Katarina Srebotnik and Ai Sugiyama 5–7, 6–3, [10–8].

Black represented Zimbabwe at the 2008 Summer Olympics in Beijing. She lost to 2nd seeded Jelena Janković from Serbia in the first round on 11 August 2008. She teamed up with Leander Paes from India for the mixed doubles at the US Open, triumphing over Liezel Huber and Jamie Murray in the finals.

In 2009, she won five doubles titles leading to the year-end championships in Doha, Qatar.

Black started 2010 strongly by winning two tournaments leading up to the Australian Open, coming to the slam with an unbeaten record. Black made it to the finals in both the women's doubles and mixed doubles. She and Huber lost the women's doubles final to Venus and Serena Williams in straight sets, 4–6, 3–6. However, she and Leander Paes won the mixed doubles in straight sets. The victory marked Black's first mixed doubles victory at the Australian Open. The victory also completed a 'Career Grand Slam' in mixed doubles.

Black and Huber broke up as exclusive doubles partners in April 2010. Since then, Black has partnered with Shahar Pe'er, Elena Vesnina, Yan Zi, Lisa Raymond, Daniela Hantuchová, Marina Erakovic, and Anastasia Rodionova. Even though she made the final of Warsaw and won a small tournament in Birmingham, she mostly achieved modest results after the break-up. Partnering with Vesnina and Hantuchová respectively, she lost in the third round of the French Open and Wimbledon. Partnering with Rodionova, she lost in the semifinals of the US Open to eventual champions Vania King and Yaroslava Shvedova. Black then missed all tournaments following the US Open and did not qualify for the WTA Championships for the first time since 1999. Black ended 2010 ranked 13th in doubles, the first time she finished a year outside the top 10 since 2000.

However, Black continued her successful partnership with Paes in 2010 as the pair won the mixed-doubles title at Wimbledon and reached the quarterfinals at the US Open.

=== 2011 ===
Entering the 2011 season, Black continued her partnership with Australian Anastasia Rodionova where they reached the semifinal of the Brisbane International and lost in the first round of Sydney International.

During the Australian Open, Black and Rodionova were seeded fifth and reached the quarterfinals where they lost to Huber and Nadia Petrova. In mixed doubles, Black partnered with Leander Paes and they were seeded fourth. They were eliminated in the second round by Chan Yung-jan and Paul Hanley in a tight straight sets loss, 6–7, 6–7. Despite Black being eliminated from both doubles and mixed doubles, Black was a sideline commentator for Seven, including the grand final for ladies doubles, and was present for former doubles partner Rennae Stubbs's speech.

Then, Black did not play until June, where she returned at the ITF Nottingham. She paired-up with Russian Arina Rodionova. She was eliminated in the first round. Her next tournament was the Nottingham Challenge where she made it to the quarterfinals alongside British Sarah Borwell. Then, at the Eastbourne International, she and Israeli Shahar Pe'er were eliminated in the quarterfinals.

Going into the Wimbledon Championships, she lost in her third round match to eventual champions Květa Peschke and Katarina Srebotnik. In mixed doubles, she lost in the quarterfinals with Indian Leander Paes against Daniel Nestor and Yung-Jan Chan.

=== 2012 ===
Black did not compete on the WTA Tour during 2012, and began playing again in October on two $25k events in Australia with Arina Rodionova. The pair won the title in Traralgon, defeating Ashleigh Barty and Sally Peers in the final. However, Black and Rodionova lost to the same team in the finals of Bendigo the following week. She finished the year ranked outside the world's top 600.

=== 2013: Return to the top 20 ===
During the 2013 season, Black had a significant comeback, as she returned to the WTA Tour at the Auckland Open, partnering Anastasia Rodionova in doubles. The pair managed to defeat the top three seeds to win the doubles title, Black's first WTA doubles title with Rodionova, and her first doubles title since 2010. Black and Rodionova lost in the 3rd round of the Australian Open, and won only one match between Indian Wells and Miami, after which the two parted ways. During the clay court season, Black began playing alongside Marina Erakovic, and they made an immediate impact, reaching the finals of the Premier Mandatory tournament in Madrid, as well as in Strasbourg. At the French Open, the pair reached the quarterfinals before losing to second seeds Andrea Hlaváčková and Lucie Hradecká. Despite reaching the final of the Birmingham Classic, Black and Erakovic went out in the second round of Wimbledon. After losing their opening match in Cincinnati, the pair reached the third round of the US Open, losing to Ekaterina Makarova and Elena Vesnina of Russia.

Black began working with Sania Mirza in September, with whom she ended up winning back to back Premier-5 tournaments in the far east. In Tokyo, Black and Mirza defeated the top seeded team of Hsieh Su-wei and Peng Shuai in the semifinals before taking out Chan Hao-ching and Liezel Huber. It was Black's first Premier 5 title since 2009, and her second of the season. This was immediately followed by a win at the China Open, where en route to the final, they once again took out the top seeds of world number 1 team Sara Errani and Roberta Vinci in the semifinals, before defeating Vera Dushevina and Arantxa Parra Santonja in the final. It was the first time since 2010 that Black had won back-to-back doubles titles, and it took her back up into the world's top 20, finishing the year ranked number 13 in the world.

== Career statistics ==
=== Grand Slam tournament performance timelines ===
Key
W	F	SF	QF	#R	RR	Q#	P#	DNQ	A	Z#	PO	G	S	B	NMS	NTI	P	NH

(W) winner; (F) finalist; (SF) semifinalist; (QF) quarterfinalist; (#R) rounds 4, 3, 2, 1; (RR) round-robin stage; (Q#) qualification round; (P#) preliminary round; (DNQ) did not qualify; (A) absent; (Z#) Davis/Fed Cup Zonal Group (with number indication) or (PO) play-off; (G) gold, (S) silver or (B) bronze Olympic/Paralympic medal; (NMS) not a Masters tournament; (NTI) not a Tier I tournament; (P) postponed; (NH) not held; (SR) strike rate (events won / competed); (W–L) win–loss record.

==== Doubles ====
Tournament	1993	1994	1995	1996	1997	1998	1999	2000	2001	2002	2003	2004	2005	2006	2007	2008	2009	2010	2011	2012	2013	2014	SR	W–L
Grand Slam tournaments
Australian Open	Absent						1R	1R	2R	1R	3R	1R	2R	QF	W	QF	QF	F	QF	A	3R	QF	1 / 15	31–14
French Open	Absent						1R	2R	3R	3R	SF	3R	F	QF	SF	SF	SF	3R	A	A	QF	QF	0 / 14	38–14
Wimbledon	Absent					1R	2R	1R	2R	SF	3R	W	W	SF	W	SF	SF	3R	3R	A	2R	2R	3 / 16	43–13
US Open	Absent					1R	1R	F	SF	SF	SF	3R	QF	QF	2R	W	F	SF	A	A	3R	SF	1 / 15	46–14
Win–loss	0–0	0–0	0–0	0–0	0–0	0–2	1–4	5–4	8–4	10–4	12–4	10–3	15–3	12–4	17–2	17–3	14–4	13–4	5–2	0–0	8–4	11–4	5 / 60	158–55
Year-end championships
Tour Championships	Absent							QF	F	F	SF	F	F	F	W	W	F	A	A	A	A	W	3 / 11	15–8
Career statistics	1993	1994	1995	1996	1997	1998	1999	2000	2001	2002	2003	2004	2005	2006	2007	2008	2009	2010	2011	2012	2013	2014	No.	
Titles	0	1	1	3	4	1	0	1	7	2	2	7	6	2	9	10	5	3	0	1	3	3	71	
Finals reached	0	1	3	3	4	1	2	5	10	5	6	9	12	8	12	14	7	6	0	2	6	8	124	
Overall W–L	1–1	6–1	9–2	16–7	19–7	18–19	28–26	32–21	52–18	46–19	48–24	45–15	59–18	43–19	69–14	66–14	49–16	41–16	9–7	7–1	38–17	49–21	750–303	
Year-end ranking	–	–	479	306	159	78	30	14	3	9	9	3	1	5	1	1	1	13	77	497	13	4	No. 1	

==== Mixed doubles ====
Tournament	1998	1999	2000	2001	2002	2003	2004	2005	2006	2007	2008	2009	2010	2011	2013	2014	2015	Career SR	Career win–loss
Australian Open	A	A	2R	1R	1R	2R	2R	QF	1R	1R	QF	2R	W	2R	1R	1R	QF	1 / 15	16–14
French Open	A	3R	3R	1R	1R	W	SF	F	2R	1R	2R	2R	QF	A	SF	2R	A	1 / 14	23–13
Wimbledon	3R	3R	2R	3R	2R	3R	W	2R	SF	QF	3R	F	W	QF	3R	2R	3R	2 / 16	38–14
US Open	A	2R	2R	QF	QF	SF	2R	2R	1R	1R	W	F	QF	A	1R	QF	A	1 / 14	24–13
Grand Slam MDR	0 / 1	0 / 3	0 / 4	0 / 4	0 / 4	1 / 4	1 / 4	0 / 4	0 / 4	0 / 4	1 / 4	0 / 4	2 / 4	0 / 2	0 / 4	0 / 4	0 / 2	5 / 60	N / A
Grand Slam W–L	2–1	5–3	5–4	4–4	3–4	11–3	12–3	8–4	6–4	3–4	11–3	10–4	14–2	2–2	3–3	3–4	4–2	N / A	101–54

=== Grand Slam tournament finals ===
==== Doubles: 9 (5 titles, 4 runner-ups) ====
Result	Year	Tournament	Surface	Partner	Opponents	Score
Loss	2000	US Open	Hard	(Russia) Elena Likhovtseva	(France) Julie Halard-Decugis (Japan) Ai Sugiyama	0–6, 6–1, 1–6
Win	2004	Wimbledon	Grass	(Australia) Rennae Stubbs	(South Africa) Liezel Huber (Japan) Ai Sugiyama	6–3, 7–6^{(7–5)}
Loss	2005	French Open	Clay	(South Africa) Liezel Huber	(Spain) Virginia Ruano Pascual (Argentina) Paola Suárez	6–4, 3–6, 3–6
Win	2005	Wimbledon	Grass	(South Africa) Liezel Huber	(Russia) Svetlana Kuznetsova (France) Amélie Mauresmo	6–2, 6–1
Win	2007	Australian Open	Hard	(South Africa) Liezel Huber	(Chinese Taipei) Chan Yung-jan (Chinese Taipei) Chuang Chia-jung	6–4, 6–7^{(4–7)}, 6–1
Win	2007	Wimbledon	Grass	(South Africa) Liezel Huber	(Slovenia) Katarina Srebotnik (Japan) Ai Sugiyama	3–6, 6–3, 6–2
Win	2008	US Open	Hard	(United States) Liezel Huber	(United States) Lisa Raymond (Australia) Samantha Stosur	6–3, 7–6^{(10–8)}
Loss	2009	US Open	Hard	(United States) Liezel Huber	(United States) Serena Williams (United States) Venus Williams	2–6, 2–6
Loss	2010	Australian Open	Hard	(United States) Liezel Huber	(United States) Serena Williams (United States) Venus Williams	4–6, 3–6

==== Mixed doubles: 8 (5 titles, 3 runner-ups) ====
By winning the 2010 Australian Open title, Black completed the mixed doubles Career Grand Slam. She became the sixth female player in history to achieve this.

Result	Year	Championship	Surface	Partner	Opponents	Score
Win	2002	French Open	Clay	(Zimbabwe) Wayne Black	(Russia) Elena Bovina (The Bahamas) Mark Knowles	6–3, 6–3
Loss	2004	French Open	Clay	(Zimbabwe) Wayne Black	(France) Tatiana Golovin (France) Richard Gasquet	3–6, 4–6
Win	2004	Wimbledon	Grass	(Zimbabwe) Wayne Black	(Australia) Alicia Molik (Australia) Todd Woodbridge	3–6, 7–6^{(10–8)}, 6–4
Win	2008	US Open	Hard	(India) Leander Paes	(United States) Liezel Huber (United Kingdom) Jamie Murray	7–6^{(8–6)}, 6–4
Loss	2009	Wimbledon	Grass	(India) Leander Paes	(Germany) Anna-Lena Grönefeld (The Bahamas) Mark Knowles	5–7, 3–6
Loss	2009	US Open	Hard	(India) Leander Paes	(United States) Carly Gullickson (United States) Travis Parrot	2–6, 4–6
Win	2010	Australian Open	Hard	(India) Leander Paes	(Russia) Ekaterina Makarova (Czech Republic) Jaroslav Levinský	7–5, 6–3
Win	2010	Wimbledon	Grass	(India) Leander Paes	(United States) Lisa Raymond (South Africa) Wesley Moodie	6–4, 7–6^{(7–5)}

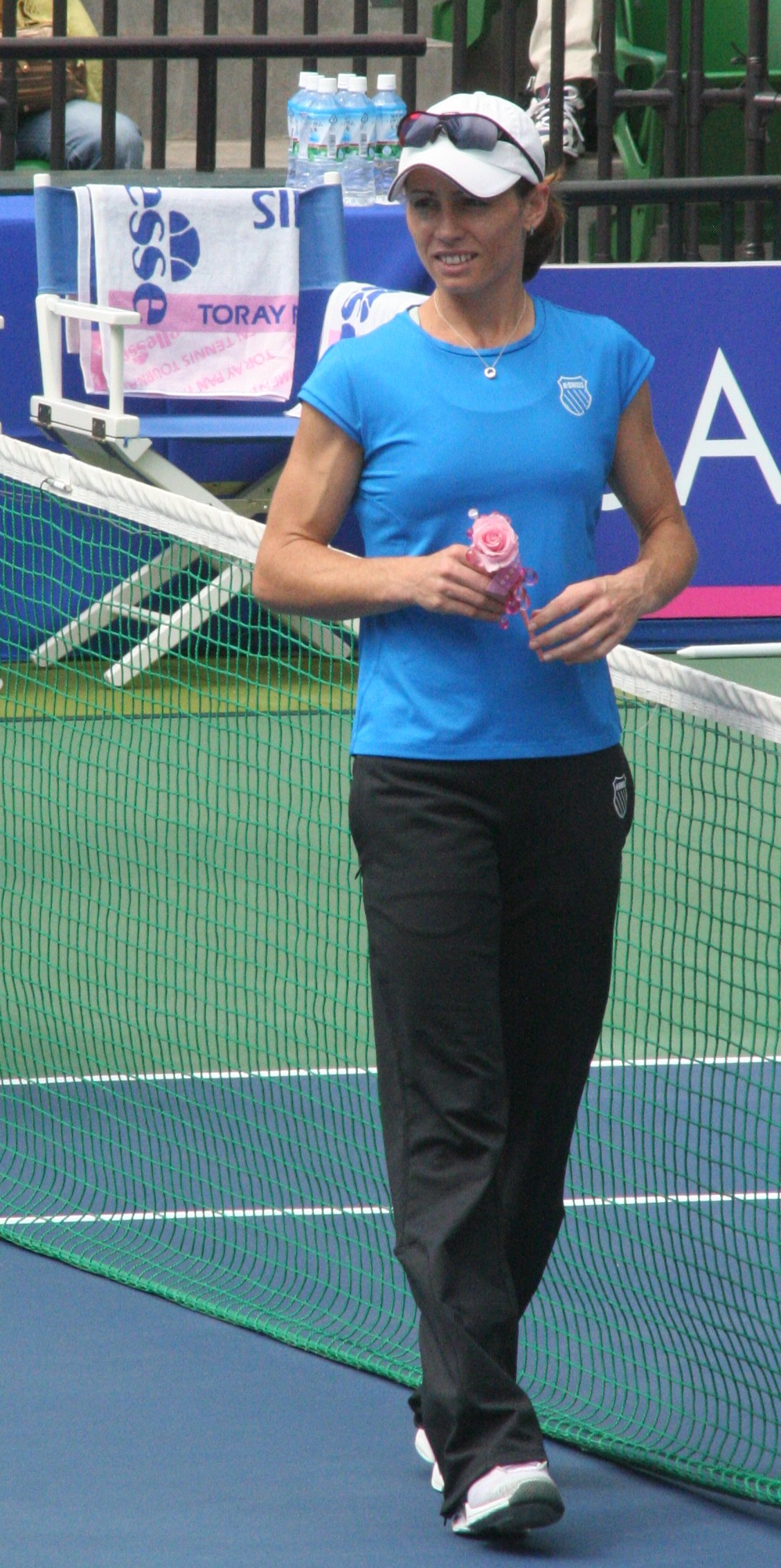
Cara Black in Tokyo 2009
