= 2007 WTA Tour =

Women's tennis circuit

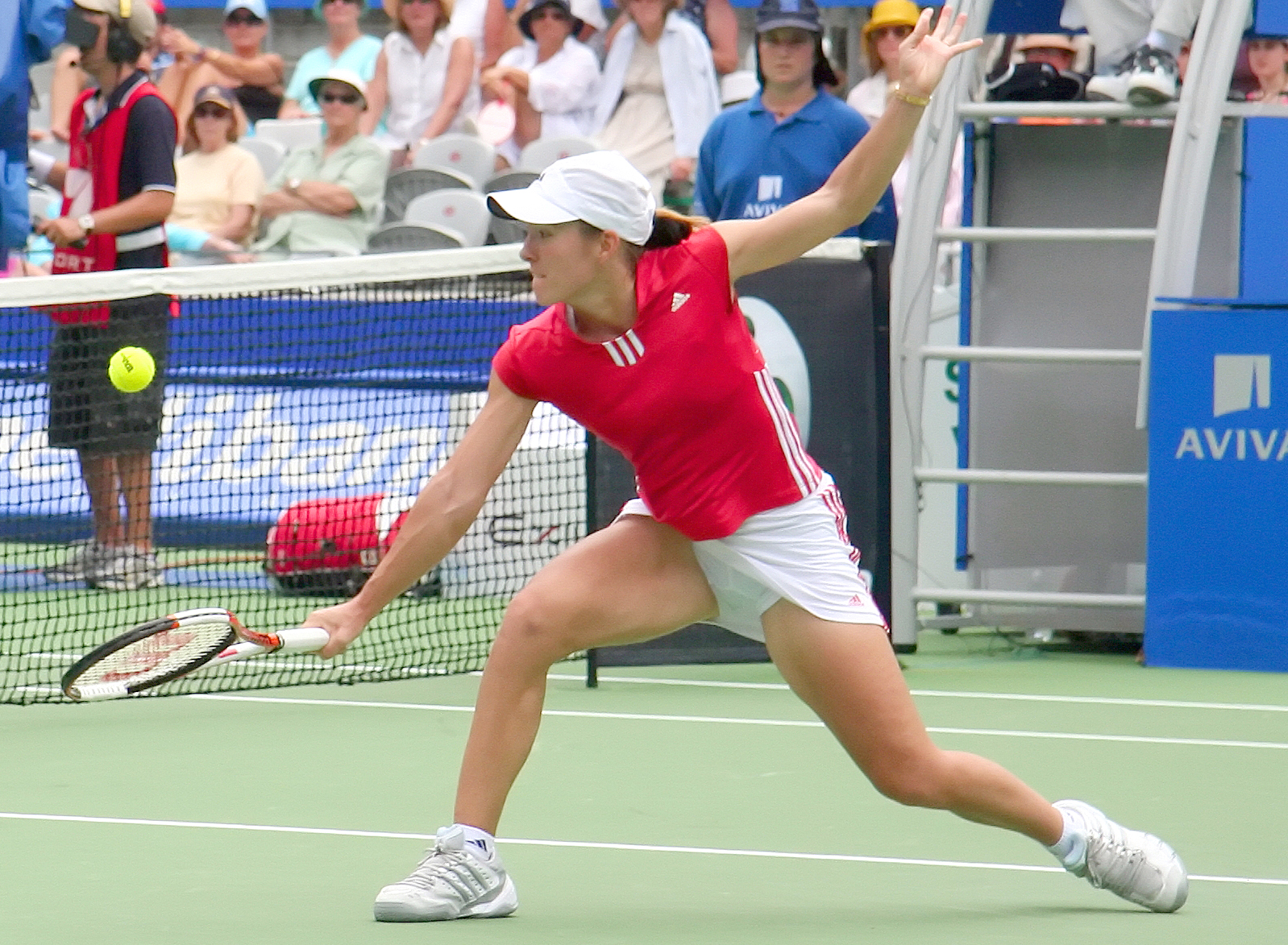
- Justine Henin finished the year as world No. 1 for the third time in her career. She won ten tournaments during the season, including two majors at the French Open and the US Open, as well as the WTA Tour Championships. She also won two Tier I events.

Details
- Duration: 30 December 2006 – 11 November 2007
- Edition: 37th
- Tournaments: 61
- Categories: Grand Slam (4); WTA Championships; WTA Tier I (10); WTA Tier II (15); WTA Tier III (17); WTA Tier IV (14)

Achievements (singles)
- Most titles: (Belgium) Justine Henin (10)
- Most finals: (Belgium) Justine Henin (11)
- Prize money leader: (Belgium) Justine Henin (US$5,429,586)
- Points leader: (Belgium) Justine Henin (5,405)

Awards
- Player of the year: (Belgium) Justine Henin
- Doubles team of the year: (Zimbabwe) Cara Black (United States) Liezel Huber
- Most improved player of the year: (Serbia) Ana Ivanovic
- Newcomer of the year: (Hungary) Ágnes Szávay
- Comeback player of the year: (United States) Lindsay Davenport

The 2007 Sony Ericsson WTA Tour was the elite professional tennis circuit organized by the Women's Tennis Association (WTA) for the 2007 tennis season. The calendar comprises the Grand Slam tournaments (supervised by the International Tennis Federation (ITF)), the WTA Tier I-IV Events, the Fed Cup (organized by the ITF) and the year-end championships.

Justine Henin put together an exceptional season, winning 10 out of the 14 events she entered. This included her sixth and seventh Grand Slam titles at the French Open and U.S. Open, whilst compiling a 63–4 win–loss record. Following her loss to Marion Bartoli in the Wimbledon semifinals she went undefeated for the rest of the year, in the process becoming the first woman to earn over $5 million in a single season.

Meanwhile, the Williams sisters returned to the forefront of tennis after years of injury struggles, with both finishing the season in the top ten, the first time since 2004 that Serena Williams finished in the upper elite in the rankings. Serena's emphatic victory at the Australian Open, ranked No. 81, surprised the tennis world. Venus Williams won her fourth Wimbledon title and sixth Grand Slam overall, becoming the lowest ranked woman to win at Wimbledon.

The season saw two former world No. 1s retire and another one make her return. Kim Clijsters cut her farewell tour short by retiring abruptly in May, having originally been due to play her last event in October. She later returned in 2009. Martina Hingis was forced to quit after she admitted that she had tested positive for cocaine. However, Lindsay Davenport made a successful return to the tour following her pregnancy and won two tournament titles in the latter half of the season.

== Season summary ==
=== Singles ===
Serena Williams started the season by unexpectedly winning her eighth singles Grand Slam title at the Australian Open. Many critics and commentators had already written her off, questioning her desire and fitness, especially after an early loss in her only warm-up tournament the week before. Williams won the title in emphatic fashion, thrashing Maria Sharapova in the final in a performance that BBC Sport called "arguably the most powerful display ever seen in women's tennis." In her earlier matches she was pushed by Nadia Petrova in round three and then by Shahar Pe'er in the quarterfinals. Defending champion Amélie Mauresmo suffered an early loss to Lucie Šafářová, allowing Nicole Vaidišová to reach her second Grand Slam semifinal. Despite losing in the final, Sharapova managed to return to the No. 1 ranking for the second time.

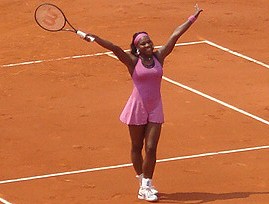
Serena Williams finished the season in the top 10 for the first time since 2004.

After withdrawing from the Australian Open due to marital problems, Justine Henin returned for Paris in February. She later won titles in Dubai and Doha that month. Kim Clijsters bade a tearful farewell to her home crowd in Belgium, playing Antwerp for the final time due to her planned retirement in October. She lost the final to Amélie Mauresmo, who won the unique diamond racket for winning the event three times. Martina Hingis won the title in Tokyo for her fifth win at that tournament, more than any other player. Venus Williams returned from missing the Australian Open with a wrist injury by winning a smaller tournament in Memphis.

In March, Daniela Hantuchová overcame a five-year hiatus between tour titles to win Indian Wells, the same event where she won her first title at in 2002. Sharapova lost to Vera Zvonareva in the fourth round and thus surrendered her No. 1 position back to Henin. Elsewhere Serena Williams backed up her Australian Open triumph with a win in Miami, saving match points against Henin in the final.

Serbians Jelena Janković and Ana Ivanovic dominated the clay season leading up to the French Open, winning the three biggest warm-up tournaments. Janković took the titles at Charleston and Rome, while Ivanovic won in Berlin. Svetlana Kuznetsova was the runner-up in the latter two events. Also during the clay court season Kim Clijsters announced her retirement, months earlier than anticipated, following an early loss in Warsaw. The finish to the clay season saw Henin pick up her fourth French Open title, and sixth Slam overall. She defeated a nervous Ana Ivanovic, in her maiden Grand Slam final, in only an hour and five minutes.

Wimbledon saw an unexpected final between Venus Williams and Marion Bartoli, the two lowest seeds to ever play in the final. Bartoli beat Janković in the fourth round and Henin in the semifinals, a win that was seen as "one of the biggest upsets ever". Williams was on the brink of losing in two of her early round matches, before beating Sharapova, Kuznetsova and Ivanovic back-to-back. In the final, Williams triumphed for her fourth Wimbledon title and sixth Slam overall. Other upsets included Vaidišová's win over the defending champion Mauresmo, who continued to struggle for form throughout the season aside from a run to the final in Eastbourne.

On the summer hardcourts Anna Chakvetadze produced some strong results, winning back-to-back titles in Cincinnati and Stanford, and then reaching the semifinals in San Diego, being stopped by eventual champion Sharapova. Ivanovic won the event in Los Angeles. Henin won her only warm-up tournament in Toronto, beating Janković in the final.

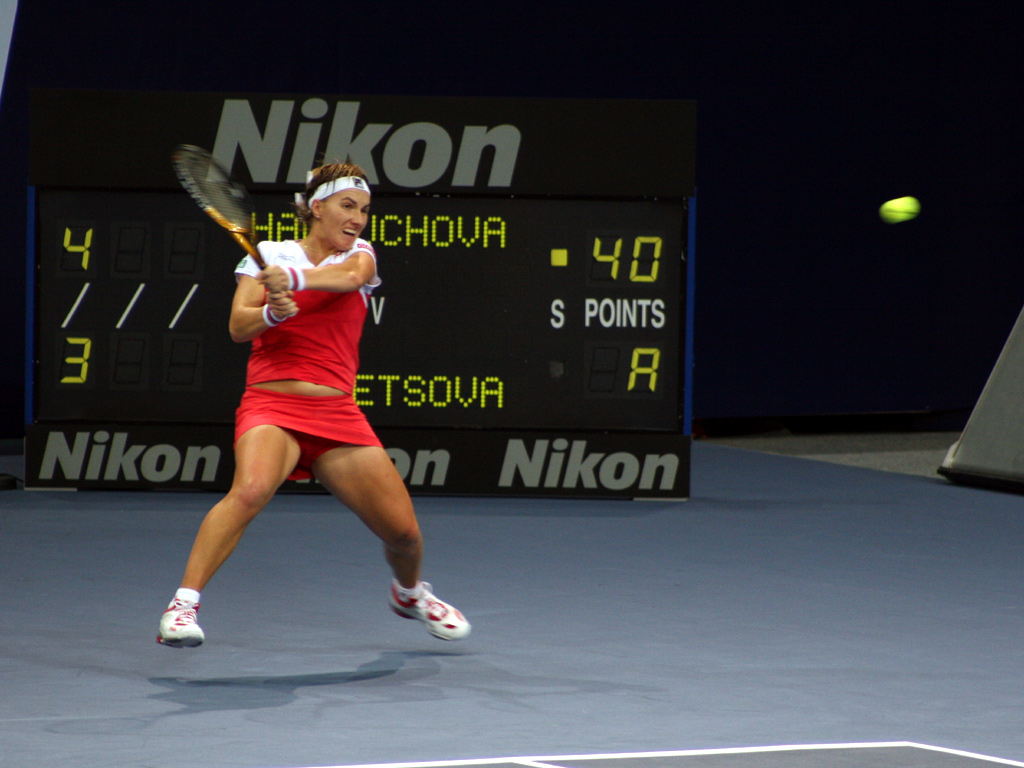
Svetlana Kuznetsova reached the U.S. Open final and won one title, finishing the season ranked at No. 2.

Henin then won her seventh Grand Slam trophy at the U.S. Open and second of the year. She beat both Serena and Venus Williams in the quarterfinal and semifinal respectively, becoming one of the few women to beat them back-to-back, and then Kuznetsova in the final. Venus Williams made it to the semifinals with wins over both Ivanovic and Janković. Chakvetadze backed up her successful results in the warm-ups by reaching her first Grand Slam semifinal, advancing from a quarter that saw defending champion Sharapova knocked out by Agnieszka Radwańska in the third round.

Lindsay Davenport made a return from her pregnancy in Bali, where she ended up winning the title. She followed that up by winning in Quebec. Henin won titles in Stuttgart and Zürich during the fall season, beating Tatiana Golovin in both finals. Elena Dementieva recorded her first ever win over Serena Williams to win her home event in Moscow. In November, Martina Hingis announced that she had tested positive for cocaine in a drugs test, and was hereby retiring from professional tennis.

The climax of the season was, as ever, the WTA Tour Championships. The eight qualifiers were Henin, Janković, Kuznetsova, Ivanovic, Serena Williams, Chakvetadze, Venus Williams and Hantuchová. Venus Williams later withdrew and Maria Sharapova replaced her. Also during round robin play Serena Williams withdrew, and Marion Bartoli was brought in as the alternate. The final saw Henin beat Sharapova to finish her career best year on a high note. She ended the season with a 63–4 win–loss record—the most impressive record in a single season since Steffi Graf in 1989, and won her last 25 matches of the year. She also became the first woman to earn over $5 million in a season.

== Schedule ==
The table below shows the 2007 WTA Tour schedule.

Key

Grand Slam events
Year-end championships
Tier I events
Tier II events
Tier III / IV events
Team events

=== January ===
Week	Tournament	Champions	Runners-up	Semifinalists	Quarterfinalists
1 Jan	Hopman Cup; Perth, Australia; Hopman Cup; Hard (i) – A$1,000,000 – 8 teams (RR)	Russia; 2–0	Spain	Round robin losers (Group A) France; Australia; United States	Round robin losers (Group B) India; Czech Republic; Croatia
1 Jan	Mondial Australian Women's Hardcourts; Gold Coast, Australia; Tier III event Hard – $175,000 – 32S/32Q/16D; Singles – Doubles	(Russia) Dinara Safina; 6–3, 3–6, 7–5	(Switzerland) Martina Hingis	(Italy) Tathiana Garbin (Israel) Shahar Pe'er	(Colombia) Catalina Castaño (Russia) Elena Vesnina (Serbia) Ana Ivanovic (Australia) Samantha Stosur
1 Jan	Mondial Australian Women's Hardcourts; Gold Coast, Australia; Tier III event Hard – $175,000 – 32S/32Q/16D; Singles – Doubles	(Russia) Dinara Safina (Slovenia) Katarina Srebotnik; 6–3, 6–4	(Czech Republic) Iveta Benešová (Russia) Galina Voskoboeva	(Italy) Tathiana Garbin (Israel) Shahar Pe'er	(Colombia) Catalina Castaño (Russia) Elena Vesnina (Serbia) Ana Ivanovic (Australia) Samantha Stosur
1 Jan	ASB Classic; Auckland, New Zealand; Tier IV event Hard – $145,000 – 32S/32Q/16D; Singles – Doubles	(Serbia) Jelena Janković; 7–6^{(9–7)}, 5–7, 6–3	(Russia) Vera Zvonareva	(France) Camille Pin (United States) Jill Craybas	(France) Émilie Loit (Argentina) Paola Suárez (Greece) Eleni Daniilidou (France) Virginie Razzano
1 Jan	ASB Classic; Auckland, New Zealand; Tier IV event Hard – $145,000 – 32S/32Q/16D; Singles – Doubles	(Slovakia) Janette Husárová (Argentina) Paola Suárez; 6–0, 6–2	(Chinese Taipei) Hsieh Su-wei (India) Shikha Uberoi	(France) Camille Pin (United States) Jill Craybas	(France) Émilie Loit (Argentina) Paola Suárez (Greece) Eleni Daniilidou (France) Virginie Razzano
8 Jan	Medibank International; Sydney, Australia; Tier II event Hard – $600,000 – 32S/32Q/16D; Singles – Doubles	(Belgium) Kim Clijsters; 4–6, 7–6^{(7–1)}, 6–4	(Serbia) Jelena Janković	(Czech Republic) Nicole Vaidišová (China) Li Na	(France) Amélie Mauresmo (Serbia) Ana Ivanovic (Israel) Shahar Pe'er (Slovenia) Katarina Srebotnik
8 Jan	Medibank International; Sydney, Australia; Tier II event Hard – $600,000 – 32S/32Q/16D; Singles – Doubles	(Germany) Anna-Lena Grönefeld (United States) Meghann Shaughnessy; 6–3, 3–6, 7–6^{(7–2)}	(France) Marion Bartoli (United States) Meilen Tu	(Czech Republic) Nicole Vaidišová (China) Li Na	(France) Amélie Mauresmo (Serbia) Ana Ivanovic (Israel) Shahar Pe'er (Slovenia) Katarina Srebotnik
8 Jan	Moorilla Hobart International; Hobart, Australia; Tier IV event Hard – $170,000 – 32S/32Q/16D; Singles – Doubles	(Russia) Anna Chakvetadze; 6–3, 7–6^{(7–3)}	(Russia) Vasilisa Bardina	(India) Sania Mirza (Austria) Sybille Bammer	(China) Zheng Jie (Australia) Alicia Molik (Colombia) Catalina Castaño (United States) Serena Williams
8 Jan	Moorilla Hobart International; Hobart, Australia; Tier IV event Hard – $170,000 – 32S/32Q/16D; Singles – Doubles	(Russia) Elena Likhovtseva (Russia) Elena Vesnina; 2–6, 6–1, 6–2	(Spain) Anabel Medina Garrigues (Spain) Virginia Ruano Pascual	(India) Sania Mirza (Austria) Sybille Bammer	(China) Zheng Jie (Australia) Alicia Molik (Colombia) Catalina Castaño (United States) Serena Williams
15 Jan; 22 Jan	Australian Open; Melbourne, Australia; Grand Slam; Hard – $6,737,973 – 128S/96Q/64D/32X; Singles – Doubles – Mixed doubles	(United States) Serena Williams; 6–1, 6–2	(Russia) Maria Sharapova	(Belgium) Kim Clijsters (Czech Republic) Nicole Vaidišová	(Israel) Shahar Pe'er (Czech Republic) Lucie Šafářová (Russia) Anna Chakvetadze (Switzerland) Martina Hingis
15 Jan; 22 Jan	Australian Open; Melbourne, Australia; Grand Slam; Hard – $6,737,973 – 128S/96Q/64D/32X; Singles – Doubles – Mixed doubles	(Zimbabwe) Cara Black (South Africa) Liezel Huber; 6–4, 6–7^{(4–7)}, 6–1	(Chinese Taipei) Chan Yung-jan (Chinese Taipei) Chuang Chia-jung	(Belgium) Kim Clijsters (Czech Republic) Nicole Vaidišová	(Israel) Shahar Pe'er (Czech Republic) Lucie Šafářová (Russia) Anna Chakvetadze (Switzerland) Martina Hingis
15 Jan; 22 Jan	Australian Open; Melbourne, Australia; Grand Slam; Hard – $6,737,973 – 128S/96Q/64D/32X; Singles – Doubles – Mixed doubles	(Canada) Daniel Nestor (Russia) Elena Likhovtseva; 6–4, 6–4	(Belarus) Max Mirnyi (Belarus) Victoria Azarenka	(Belgium) Kim Clijsters (Czech Republic) Nicole Vaidišová	(Israel) Shahar Pe'er (Czech Republic) Lucie Šafářová (Russia) Anna Chakvetadze (Switzerland) Martina Hingis
29 Jan	Toray Pan Pacific Open; Tokyo, Japan; Tier I event Carpet (i) – $1,340,000 – 28S/32Q/16D; Singles – Doubles	(Switzerland) Martina Hingis; 6–4, 6–2	(Serbia) Ana Ivanovic	(Russia) Elena Dementieva (Russia) Maria Sharapova	(Serbia) Jelena Janković (Australia) Samantha Stosur (Japan) Ai Sugiyama (Italy) Roberta Vinci
29 Jan	Toray Pan Pacific Open; Tokyo, Japan; Tier I event Carpet (i) – $1,340,000 – 28S/32Q/16D; Singles – Doubles	(United States) Lisa Raymond (Australia) Samantha Stosur; 7–6^{(8–6)}, 3–6, 7–5	(United States) Vania King (Australia) Rennae Stubbs	(Russia) Elena Dementieva (Russia) Maria Sharapova	(Serbia) Jelena Janković (Australia) Samantha Stosur (Japan) Ai Sugiyama (Italy) Roberta Vinci

=== February ===
Week	Tournament	Champions	Runners-up	Semifinalists	Quarterfinalists
5 Feb	Open Gaz de France; Paris, France; Tier II event Hard (i) – $600,000 – 28S/32Q/16D; Singles – Doubles	(Russia) Nadia Petrova; 4–6, 6–1, 6–4	(Czech Republic) Lucie Šafářová	(Belgium) Justine Henin (France) Amélie Mauresmo	(France) Tatiana Golovin (Russia) Svetlana Kuznetsova (Russia) Dinara Safina (Russia) Anna Chakvetadze
5 Feb	Open Gaz de France; Paris, France; Tier II event Hard (i) – $600,000 – 28S/32Q/16D; Singles – Doubles	(Zimbabwe) Cara Black (South Africa) Liezel Huber; 6–2, 6–0	(Czech Republic) Gabriela Navrátilová (Czech Republic) Vladimíra Uhlířová	(Belgium) Justine Henin (France) Amélie Mauresmo	(France) Tatiana Golovin (Russia) Svetlana Kuznetsova (Russia) Dinara Safina (Russia) Anna Chakvetadze
5 Feb	Pattaya Women's Open; Pattaya, Thailand; Tier IV event Hard – $170,000 – 32S/32Q/16D; Singles – Doubles	(Austria) Sybille Bammer; 7–5, 3–6, 7–5	(Argentina) Gisela Dulko	(India) Sania Mirza (China) Peng Shuai	(Italy) Mara Santangelo (Slovakia) Martina Suchá (Australia) Nicole Pratt (Israel) Tzipora Obziler
5 Feb	Pattaya Women's Open; Pattaya, Thailand; Tier IV event Hard – $170,000 – 32S/32Q/16D; Singles – Doubles	(Australia) Nicole Pratt (Italy) Mara Santangelo; 6–4, 7–6^{(7–4)}	(Chinese Taipei) Chan Yung-jan (Chinese Taipei) Chuang Chia-jung	(India) Sania Mirza (China) Peng Shuai	(Italy) Mara Santangelo (Slovakia) Martina Suchá (Australia) Nicole Pratt (Israel) Tzipora Obziler
12 Feb	Proximus Diamond Games; Antwerp, Belgium; Tier II event Hard (i) – $600,000 – 28S/32Q/16D; Singles – Doubles	(France) Amélie Mauresmo; 6–4, 7–6^{(7–4)}	(Belgium) Kim Clijsters	(Russia) Anna Chakvetadze (France) Tatiana Golovin	(Russia) Dinara Safina (Serbia) Ana Ivanovic (Russia) Nadia Petrova (Russia) Elena Likhovtseva
12 Feb	Proximus Diamond Games; Antwerp, Belgium; Tier II event Hard (i) – $600,000 – 28S/32Q/16D; Singles – Doubles	(Zimbabwe) Cara Black (South Africa) Liezel Huber; 7–5, 4–6, 6–1	(Russia) Elena Likhovtseva (Russia) Elena Vesnina	(Russia) Anna Chakvetadze (France) Tatiana Golovin	(Russia) Dinara Safina (Serbia) Ana Ivanovic (Russia) Nadia Petrova (Russia) Elena Likhovtseva
12 Feb	Sony Ericsson International; Bangalore, India; Tier III event Hard – $175,000 – 32S/27Q/16D; Singles – Doubles	(Russia) Yaroslava Shvedova; 6–4, 6–4	(Italy) Mara Santangelo	(Ukraine) Olga Savchuk (Israel) Tzipora Obziler	(Croatia) Jelena Kostanić Tošić (Hungary) Melinda Czink (India) Sania Mirza (Japan) Yurika Sema
12 Feb	Sony Ericsson International; Bangalore, India; Tier III event Hard – $175,000 – 32S/27Q/16D; Singles – Doubles	(Chinese Taipei) Chan Yung-jan (Chinese Taipei) Chuang Chia-jung; 6–7^{(4–7)}, 6–2, [11–9]	(Chinese Taipei) Hsieh Su-wei (Russia) Alla Kudryavtseva	(Ukraine) Olga Savchuk (Israel) Tzipora Obziler	(Croatia) Jelena Kostanić Tošić (Hungary) Melinda Czink (India) Sania Mirza (Japan) Yurika Sema
19 Feb	Dubai Tennis Championships; Dubai, United Arab Emirates; Tier II event Hard – $1,500,000 – 28S/32Q/16D; Singles – Doubles	(Belgium) Justine Henin; 6–4, 7–5	(France) Amélie Mauresmo	(Russia) Svetlana Kuznetsova (Serbia) Jelena Janković	(Greece) Eleni Daniilidou (Switzerland) Martina Hingis (Slovakia) Daniela Hantuchová (Switzerland) Patty Schnyder
19 Feb	Dubai Tennis Championships; Dubai, United Arab Emirates; Tier II event Hard – $1,500,000 – 28S/32Q/16D; Singles – Doubles	(Zimbabwe) Cara Black (South Africa) Liezel Huber; 7–6^{(7–5)}, 6–4	(Russia) Svetlana Kuznetsova (Australia) Alicia Molik	(Russia) Svetlana Kuznetsova (Serbia) Jelena Janković	(Greece) Eleni Daniilidou (Switzerland) Martina Hingis (Slovakia) Daniela Hantuchová (Switzerland) Patty Schnyder
19 Feb	Cellular South Cup; Memphis, United States; Tier III event Hard (i) – $175,000 – 32S/32Q/16D; Singles – Doubles	(United States) Venus Williams; 6–1, 6–1	(Israel) Shahar Pe'er	(United States) Meilen Tu (Romania) Ioana Raluca Olaru	(Sweden) Sofia Arvidsson (Australia) Samantha Stosur (United States) Bethanie Mattek (United States) Laura Granville
19 Feb	Cellular South Cup; Memphis, United States; Tier III event Hard (i) – $175,000 – 32S/32Q/16D; Singles – Doubles	(Australia) Nicole Pratt (Australia) Bryanne Stewart; 7–5, 4–6, [10–5]	(Slovakia) Jarmila Gajdošová (Japan) Akiko Morigami	(United States) Meilen Tu (Romania) Ioana Raluca Olaru	(Sweden) Sofia Arvidsson (Australia) Samantha Stosur (United States) Bethanie Mattek (United States) Laura Granville
19 Feb	XV Copa Colsanitas Santander; Bogotá, Colombia; Tier III event Clay – $175,000 – 32S/32Q/16D; Singles – Doubles	(Italy) Roberta Vinci; 6–7^{(5–7)}, 6–4, 0–3 ret.	(Italy) Tathiana Garbin	(Italy) Flavia Pennetta (Spain) Lourdes Domínguez Lino	(France) Émilie Loit (Czech Republic) Klára Zakopalová (Italy) Nathalie Viérin (Czech Republic) Barbora Záhlavová Strýcová
19 Feb	XV Copa Colsanitas Santander; Bogotá, Colombia; Tier III event Clay – $175,000 – 32S/32Q/16D; Singles – Doubles	(Spain) Lourdes Domínguez Lino (Argentina) Paola Suárez; 1–6, 6–3, [11–9]	(Italy) Flavia Pennetta (Italy) Roberta Vinci	(Italy) Flavia Pennetta (Spain) Lourdes Domínguez Lino	(France) Émilie Loit (Czech Republic) Klára Zakopalová (Italy) Nathalie Viérin (Czech Republic) Barbora Záhlavová Strýcová
26 Feb	Qatar Total Open; Doha, Qatar; Tier II event Hard – $1,340,000 – 28S/32Q/16D; Singles – Doubles	(Belgium) Justine Henin; 6–4, 6–2	(Russia) Svetlana Kuznetsova	(Serbia) Jelena Janković (Slovakia) Daniela Hantuchová	(Switzerland) Martina Hingis (Italy) Francesca Schiavone (Ukraine) Kateryna Bondarenko (Switzerland) Patty Schnyder
26 Feb	Qatar Total Open; Doha, Qatar; Tier II event Hard – $1,340,000 – 28S/32Q/16D; Singles – Doubles	(Switzerland) Martina Hingis (Russia) Maria Kirilenko; 6–1, 6–1	(Hungary) Ágnes Szávay (Czech Republic) Vladimíra Uhlířová	(Serbia) Jelena Janković (Slovakia) Daniela Hantuchová	(Switzerland) Martina Hingis (Italy) Francesca Schiavone (Ukraine) Kateryna Bondarenko (Switzerland) Patty Schnyder
26 Feb	Abierto Mexicano TELCEL; Acapulco, Mexico; Tier III event Clay – $180,000 – 32S/32Q/16D; Singles – Doubles	(France) Émilie Loit; 7–6(0), 6–4	(Italy) Flavia Pennetta	(Germany) Julia Schruff (Italy) Sara Errani	(France) Alizé Cornet (Argentina) Gisela Dulko (Mexico) Melissa Torres Sandoval (Italy) Tathiana Garbin
26 Feb	Abierto Mexicano TELCEL; Acapulco, Mexico; Tier III event Clay – $180,000 – 32S/32Q/16D; Singles – Doubles	(Spain) Lourdes Domínguez Lino (Spain) Arantxa Parra Santonja; 6–3, 6–3	(France) Émilie Loit (Australia) Nicole Pratt	(Germany) Julia Schruff (Italy) Sara Errani	(France) Alizé Cornet (Argentina) Gisela Dulko (Mexico) Melissa Torres Sandoval (Italy) Tathiana Garbin

=== March ===
Week	Tournament	Champions	Runners-up	Semifinalists	Quarterfinalists
5 Mar; 12 Mar	Pacific Life Open; Indian Wells, United States; Tier I event Hard – $2,100,000 – 96S/48Q/32D; Singles – Doubles	(Slovakia) Daniela Hantuchová; 6–3, 6–4	(Russia) Svetlana Kuznetsova	(China) Li Na (Austria) Sybille Bammer	(Russia) Vera Zvonareva (Israel) Shahar Pe'er (France) Tatiana Golovin (Czech Republic) Nicole Vaidišová
5 Mar; 12 Mar	Pacific Life Open; Indian Wells, United States; Tier I event Hard – $2,100,000 – 96S/48Q/32D; Singles – Doubles	(United States) Lisa Raymond (Australia) Samantha Stosur; 6–3, 7–5	(Chinese Taipei) Yung-Jan Chan (Chinese Taipei) Chuang Chia-jung	(China) Li Na (Austria) Sybille Bammer	(Russia) Vera Zvonareva (Israel) Shahar Pe'er (France) Tatiana Golovin (Czech Republic) Nicole Vaidišová
19 Mar; 26 Mar	Sony Ericsson Open; Key Biscayne, United States; Tier I event Hard – $3,450,000 – 96S/48Q/32D; Singles – Doubles	(United States) Serena Williams; 0–6, 7–5, 6–3	(Belgium) Justine Henin	(Israel) Shahar Pe'er (Russia) Anna Chakvetadze	(Czech Republic) Nicole Vaidišová (Italy) Tathiana Garbin (China) Li Na (Russia) Nadia Petrova
19 Mar; 26 Mar	Sony Ericsson Open; Key Biscayne, United States; Tier I event Hard – $3,450,000 – 96S/48Q/32D; Singles – Doubles	(United States) Lisa Raymond (Australia) Samantha Stosur; 6–4, 3–6, [10–2]	(Zimbabwe) Cara Black (South Africa) Liezel Huber	(Israel) Shahar Pe'er (Russia) Anna Chakvetadze	(Czech Republic) Nicole Vaidišová (Italy) Tathiana Garbin (China) Li Na (Russia) Nadia Petrova

=== April ===
Week	Tournament	Champions	Runners-up	Semifinalists	Quarterfinalists
2 Apr	Bausch & Lomb Championships; Amelia Island, United States; Tier II event Clay – $600,000 (Green) – 56S/32Q/16D; Singles – Doubles	(France) Tatiana Golovin; 6–2, 6–1	(Russia) Nadia Petrova	(Serbia) Ana Ivanovic (Austria) Sybille Bammer	(Russia) Dinara Safina (Slovakia) Daniela Hantuchová (United States) Venus Williams (Serbia) Jelena Janković
2 Apr	Bausch & Lomb Championships; Amelia Island, United States; Tier II event Clay – $600,000 (Green) – 56S/32Q/16D; Singles – Doubles	(Italy) Mara Santangelo (Slovenia) Katarina Srebotnik; 6–3, 7–6^{(7–4)}	(Spain) Anabel Medina Garrigues (Spain) Virginia Ruano Pascual	(Serbia) Ana Ivanovic (Austria) Sybille Bammer	(Russia) Dinara Safina (Slovakia) Daniela Hantuchová (United States) Venus Williams (Serbia) Jelena Janković
9 Apr	Family Circle Cup; Charleston, United States; Tier I event Clay – $1,340,000 (Green) – 56S/32Q/28D; Singles – Doubles	(Serbia) Jelena Janković; 6–2, 6–2	(Russia) Dinara Safina	(Russia) Vera Zvonareva (United States) Venus Williams	(Netherlands) Michaëlla Krajicek (France) Tatiana Golovin (Spain) Anabel Medina Garrigues (Slovenia) Katarina Srebotnik
9 Apr	Family Circle Cup; Charleston, United States; Tier I event Clay – $1,340,000 (Green) – 56S/32Q/28D; Singles – Doubles	(China) Yan Zi (China) Zheng Jie; 7–5, 6–0	(China) Peng Shuai (China) Sun Tiantian	(Russia) Vera Zvonareva (United States) Venus Williams	(Netherlands) Michaëlla Krajicek (France) Tatiana Golovin (Spain) Anabel Medina Garrigues (Slovenia) Katarina Srebotnik
16 April	Fed Cup: Quarterfinals; Castellaneta Marina, Italy, Clay; Limoges, France, Clay (i); Moscow, Russia, Clay (i); Delray Beach, Florida, United States, Hard	Quarterfinal winners Russia 4–1; United States 4–1; China 3–2; Spain 3–2	Quarterfinal losers Israel; Germany; France; Italy		
23 Apr	Budapest Grand Prix; Budapest, Hungary; Tier III event Clay – $175,000 – 32S/32Q/16D; Singles – Doubles	(Argentina) Gisela Dulko; 6–7^{(2–7)}, 6–2, 6–2	(Romania) Sorana Cîrstea	(Hungary) Ágnes Szávay (Italy) Karin Knapp	(Ukraine) Olga Savchuk (France) Émilie Loit (Luxembourg) Anne Kremer (Greece) Eleni Daniilidou
23 Apr	Budapest Grand Prix; Budapest, Hungary; Tier III event Clay – $175,000 – 32S/32Q/16D; Singles – Doubles	(Hungary) Ágnes Szávay (Czech Republic) Vladimíra Uhlířová; 7–5, 6–2	(Germany) Martina Müller (Czech Republic) Gabriela Navrátilová	(Hungary) Ágnes Szávay (Italy) Karin Knapp	(Ukraine) Olga Savchuk (France) Émilie Loit (Luxembourg) Anne Kremer (Greece) Eleni Daniilidou
30 Apr	J&S Cup; Warsaw, Poland; Tier II event Clay – $600,000 – 28S/32Q/16D; Singles – Doubles	(Belgium) Justine Henin; 6–1, 6–3	(Ukraine) Alona Bondarenko	(Serbia) Jelena Janković (Russia) Svetlana Kuznetsova	(Italy) Mara Santangelo (Russia) Anna Chakvetadze (United States) Venus Williams (Ukraine) Julia Vakulenko
30 Apr	J&S Cup; Warsaw, Poland; Tier II event Clay – $600,000 – 28S/32Q/16D; Singles – Doubles	(Russia) Vera Dushevina (Ukraine) Tatiana Perebiynis; 7–5, 3–6, [10–2]	(Russia) Elena Likhovtseva (Russia) Elena Vesnina	(Serbia) Jelena Janković (Russia) Svetlana Kuznetsova	(Italy) Mara Santangelo (Russia) Anna Chakvetadze (United States) Venus Williams (Ukraine) Julia Vakulenko
30 Apr	Estoril Open; Oeiras, Portugal; Tier IV event Clay – $145,000 – 32S/32Q/16D; Singles – Doubles	(Germany) Gréta Arn; 2–6, 6–1, 7–6^{(7–3)}	(Belarus) Victoria Azarenka	(Spain) Nuria Llagostera Vives (Czech Republic) Lucie Šafářová	(France) Marion Bartoli (Sweden) Sofia Arvidsson (Spain) Lourdes Domínguez Lino (Argentina) Gisela Dulko
30 Apr	Estoril Open; Oeiras, Portugal; Tier IV event Clay – $145,000 – 32S/32Q/16D; Singles – Doubles	(Romania) Andreea Ehritt-Vanc (Russia) Anastassia Rodionova; 6–3, 6–2	(Spain) Lourdes Domínguez Lino (Spain) Arantxa Parra Santonja	(Spain) Nuria Llagostera Vives (Czech Republic) Lucie Šafářová	(France) Marion Bartoli (Sweden) Sofia Arvidsson (Spain) Lourdes Domínguez Lino (Argentina) Gisela Dulko

=== May ===
Week	Tournament	Champions	Runners-up	Semifinalists	Quarterfinalists
7 May	Qatar Telecom German Open; Berlin, Germany; Tier I event Clay – $1,340,000 – 56S/32Q/28D; Singles – Doubles	(Serbia) Ana Ivanovic; 3–6, 6–4, 7–6^{(7–4)}	(Russia) Svetlana Kuznetsova	(Belgium) Justine Henin (Ukraine) Julia Vakulenko	(Serbia) Jelena Janković (Russia) Nadia Petrova (Switzerland) Patty Schnyder (Russia) Dinara Safina
7 May	Qatar Telecom German Open; Berlin, Germany; Tier I event Clay – $1,340,000 – 56S/32Q/28D; Singles – Doubles	(United States) Lisa Raymond (Australia) Samantha Stosur; 6–3, 6–4	(Italy) Tathiana Garbin (Italy) Roberta Vinci	(Belgium) Justine Henin (Ukraine) Julia Vakulenko	(Serbia) Jelena Janković (Russia) Nadia Petrova (Switzerland) Patty Schnyder (Russia) Dinara Safina
7 May	ECM Prague Open; Prague, Czech Republic; Tier IV event Clay – $145,000 – 32S/32Q/16D; Singles – Doubles	(Japan) Akiko Morigami; 6–1, 6–3	(France) Marion Bartoli	(Czech Republic) Klára Zakopalová (Belarus) Victoria Azarenka	(Slovakia) Jarmila Gajdošová (Germany) Julia Schruff (France) Camille Pin (Slovakia) Dominika Cibulková
7 May	ECM Prague Open; Prague, Czech Republic; Tier IV event Clay – $145,000 – 32S/32Q/16D; Singles – Doubles	(Czech Republic) Petra Cetkovská (Czech Republic) Andrea Hlaváčková; 7–6^{(9–7)}, 6–2	(China) Ji Chunmei (China) Sun Shengnan	(Czech Republic) Klára Zakopalová (Belarus) Victoria Azarenka	(Slovakia) Jarmila Gajdošová (Germany) Julia Schruff (France) Camille Pin (Slovakia) Dominika Cibulková
14 May	Internazionali BNL d'Italia; Rome, Italy; Tier I event Clay – $1,340,000 – 56S/32Q/28D; Singles – Doubles	(Serbia) Jelena Janković; 7–5, 6–1	(Russia) Svetlana Kuznetsova	(Switzerland) Patty Schnyder (Slovakia) Daniela Hantuchová	(United States) Serena Williams (Russia) Elena Dementieva (Spain) Anabel Medina Garrigues (Russia) Dinara Safina
14 May	Internazionali BNL d'Italia; Rome, Italy; Tier I event Clay – $1,340,000 – 56S/32Q/28D; Singles – Doubles	(France) Nathalie Dechy (Italy) Mara Santangelo; 6–4, 6–1	(Italy) Tathiana Garbin (Italy) Roberta Vinci	(Switzerland) Patty Schnyder (Slovakia) Daniela Hantuchová	(United States) Serena Williams (Russia) Elena Dementieva (Spain) Anabel Medina Garrigues (Russia) Dinara Safina
14 May	GP SAR La Princesse Lalla Meryem; Fez, Morocco; Tier IV event Clay – $145,000 – 32S/32Q/16D; Singles – Doubles	(Venezuela) Milagros Sequera; 6–1, 6–3	(Canada) Aleksandra Wozniak	(Argentina) María Emilia Salerni (Romania) Ioana Raluca Olaru	(Germany) Sandra Klösel (France) Alizé Cornet (Denmark) Caroline Wozniacki (France) Camille Pin
14 May	GP SAR La Princesse Lalla Meryem; Fez, Morocco; Tier IV event Clay – $145,000 – 32S/32Q/16D; Singles – Doubles	(United States) Vania King (India) Sania Mirza; 6–1, 6–2	(Romania) Andreea Ehritt-Vanc (Russia) Anastassia Rodionova	(Argentina) María Emilia Salerni (Romania) Ioana Raluca Olaru	(Germany) Sandra Klösel (France) Alizé Cornet (Denmark) Caroline Wozniacki (France) Camille Pin
21 May	İstanbul Cup; Istanbul, Turkey; Tier III event Clay – $200,000 – 30S/32Q/16D; Singles – Doubles	(Russia) Elena Dementieva; 7–6^{(7–5)}, 3–0 ret.	(France) Aravane Rezaï	(Russia) Maria Sharapova (Ukraine) Alona Bondarenko	(Poland) Agnieszka Radwańska (United States) Meghann Shaughnessy (Switzerland) Patty Schnyder (Colombia) Catalina Castaño
21 May	İstanbul Cup; Istanbul, Turkey; Tier III event Clay – $200,000 – 30S/32Q/16D; Singles – Doubles	(Poland) Agnieszka Radwańska (Poland) Urszula Radwańska; 6–1, 6–3	(Chinese Taipei) Chan Yung-jan (India) Sania Mirza	(Russia) Maria Sharapova (Ukraine) Alona Bondarenko	(Poland) Agnieszka Radwańska (United States) Meghann Shaughnessy (Switzerland) Patty Schnyder (Colombia) Catalina Castaño
21 May	Internationaux de Strasbourg; Strasbourg, France; Tier III event Clay – $175,000 – 30S/23Q/15D; Singles – Doubles	(Spain) Anabel Medina Garrigues; 6–4, 4–6, 6–4	(France) Amélie Mauresmo	(France) Marion Bartoli (Serbia) Jelena Janković	(France) Émilie Loit (Russia) Elena Vesnina (China) Li Na (Italy) Maria Elena Camerin
21 May	Internationaux de Strasbourg; Strasbourg, France; Tier III event Clay – $175,000 – 30S/23Q/15D; Singles – Doubles	(China) Yan Zi (China) Zheng Jie; 6–3, 6–4	(Australia) Alicia Molik (China) Sun Tiantian	(France) Marion Bartoli (Serbia) Jelena Janković	(France) Émilie Loit (Russia) Elena Vesnina (China) Li Na (Italy) Maria Elena Camerin
27 May; 4 Jun	French Open; Paris, France; Grand Slam; Clay – $8,978,567 – 128S/96Q/64D/32X; Singles – Doubles – Mixed doubles	(Belgium) Justine Henin; 6–1, 6–2	(Serbia) Ana Ivanovic	(Serbia) Jelena Janković (Russia) Maria Sharapova	(United States) Serena Williams (Czech Republic) Nicole Vaidišová (Russia) Svetlana Kuznetsova (Russia) Anna Chakvetadze
27 May; 4 Jun	French Open; Paris, France; Grand Slam; Clay – $8,978,567 – 128S/96Q/64D/32X; Singles – Doubles – Mixed doubles	(Australia) Alicia Molik (Italy) Mara Santangelo; 7–6^{(7–5)}, 6–4	(Slovenia) Katarina Srebotnik (Japan) Ai Sugiyama	(Serbia) Jelena Janković (Russia) Maria Sharapova	(United States) Serena Williams (Czech Republic) Nicole Vaidišová (Russia) Svetlana Kuznetsova (Russia) Anna Chakvetadze
27 May; 4 Jun	French Open; Paris, France; Grand Slam; Clay – $8,978,567 – 128S/96Q/64D/32X; Singles – Doubles – Mixed doubles	(Israel) Andy Ram (France) Nathalie Dechy; 7–5, 6–3	(Serbia) Nenad Zimonjić (Slovenia) Katarina Srebotnik	(Serbia) Jelena Janković (Russia) Maria Sharapova	(United States) Serena Williams (Czech Republic) Nicole Vaidišová (Russia) Svetlana Kuznetsova (Russia) Anna Chakvetadze

=== June ===
Week	Tournament	Champions	Runners-up	Semifinalists	Quarterfinalists
11 Jun	DFS Classic; Birmingham, Great Britain; Tier III event Grass – $200,000 – 56S/32Q/16D; Singles – Doubles	(Serbia) Jelena Janković; 4–6, 6–3, 7–5	(Russia) Maria Sharapova	(France) Marion Bartoli (Italy) Mara Santangelo	(Russia) Elena Likhovtseva (Slovakia) Daniela Hantuchová (China) Li Na (Ukraine) Alona Bondarenko
11 Jun	DFS Classic; Birmingham, Great Britain; Tier III event Grass – $200,000 – 56S/32Q/16D; Singles – Doubles	(Chinese Taipei) Chan Yung-jan (Chinese Taipei) Chuang Chia-jung; 7–6^{(7–3)}, 6–3	(China) Sun Tiantian (United States) Meilen Tu	(France) Marion Bartoli (Italy) Mara Santangelo	(Russia) Elena Likhovtseva (Slovakia) Daniela Hantuchová (China) Li Na (Ukraine) Alona Bondarenko
11 Jun	Barcelona KIA; Barcelona, Spain; Tier IV event Clay – $145,000 – 32S/32Q/16D; Singles – Doubles	(United States) Meghann Shaughnessy; 6–3, 6–2	(Romania) Edina Gallovits	(Italy) Flavia Pennetta (France) Virginie Razzano	(Hungary) Ágnes Szávay (France) Émilie Loit (Estonia) Kaia Kanepi (Russia) Alla Kudryavtseva
11 Jun	Barcelona KIA; Barcelona, Spain; Tier IV event Clay – $145,000 – 32S/32Q/16D; Singles – Doubles	(Spain) Arantxa Parra Santonja (Spain) Nuria Llagostera Vives; 7–6^{(7–3)}, 2–6, [12–10]	(Spain) Lourdes Domínguez Lino (Italy) Flavia Pennetta	(Italy) Flavia Pennetta (France) Virginie Razzano	(Hungary) Ágnes Szávay (France) Émilie Loit (Estonia) Kaia Kanepi (Russia) Alla Kudryavtseva
18 Jun	Hastings Direct International Championships; Eastbourne, Great Britain; Tier II event Grass – $600,000 – 28S/32Q/16D; Singles – Doubles	(Belgium) Justine Henin; 7–5, 6–7^{(4–7)}, 7–6^{(7–2)}	(France) Amélie Mauresmo	(France) Marion Bartoli (Russia) Nadia Petrova	(Czech Republic) Nicole Vaidišová (Russia) Elena Dementieva (Austria) Sybille Bammer (Israel) Shahar Pe'er
18 Jun	Hastings Direct International Championships; Eastbourne, Great Britain; Tier II event Grass – $600,000 – 28S/32Q/16D; Singles – Doubles	(United States) Lisa Raymond (Australia) Samantha Stosur; 6–7^{(5–7)}, 6–4, 6–3	(Czech Republic) Květa Peschke (Australia) Rennae Stubbs	(France) Marion Bartoli (Russia) Nadia Petrova	(Czech Republic) Nicole Vaidišová (Russia) Elena Dementieva (Austria) Sybille Bammer (Israel) Shahar Pe'er
18 Jun	Ordina Open 's-Hertogenbosch, Netherlands; Tier III event Grass – $175,000 – 32S/32Q/16D; Singles – Doubles	(Russia) Anna Chakvetadze; 7–6^{(7–2)}, 3–6, 6–3	(Serbia) Jelena Janković	(Russia) Dinara Safina (Slovakia) Daniela Hantuchová	(Ukraine) Alona Bondarenko (Italy) Flavia Pennetta (Germany) Angelique Kerber (Serbia) Ana Ivanovic
18 Jun	Ordina Open 's-Hertogenbosch, Netherlands; Tier III event Grass – $175,000 – 32S/32Q/16D; Singles – Doubles	(Chinese Taipei) Chan Yung-jan (Chinese Taipei) Chuang Chia-jung; 7–5, 6–2	(Spain) Anabel Medina Garrigues (Spain) Virginia Ruano Pascual	(Russia) Dinara Safina (Slovakia) Daniela Hantuchová	(Ukraine) Alona Bondarenko (Italy) Flavia Pennetta (Germany) Angelique Kerber (Serbia) Ana Ivanovic
25 Jun; 2 Jul	Wimbledon Championships; London, Great Britain; Grand Slam; Grass – $9,221,372 – 128S/96Q/64D/32X; Singles – Doubles – Mixed doubles	(United States) Venus Williams; 6–4, 6–1	(France) Marion Bartoli	(Belgium) Justine Henin (Serbia) Ana Ivanovic	(United States) Serena Williams (Netherlands) Michaëlla Krajicek (Czech Republic) Nicole Vaidišová (Russia) Svetlana Kuznetsova
25 Jun; 2 Jul	Wimbledon Championships; London, Great Britain; Grand Slam; Grass – $9,221,372 – 128S/96Q/64D/32X; Singles – Doubles – Mixed doubles	(Zimbabwe) Cara Black (South Africa) Liezel Huber; 3–6, 6–3, 6–2	(Slovenia) Katarina Srebotnik (Japan) Ai Sugiyama	(Belgium) Justine Henin (Serbia) Ana Ivanovic	(United States) Serena Williams (Netherlands) Michaëlla Krajicek (Czech Republic) Nicole Vaidišová (Russia) Svetlana Kuznetsova
25 Jun; 2 Jul	Wimbledon Championships; London, Great Britain; Grand Slam; Grass – $9,221,372 – 128S/96Q/64D/32X; Singles – Doubles – Mixed doubles	(United Kingdom) Jamie Murray (Serbia) Jelena Janković; 6–4, 3–6, 6–1	(Sweden) Jonas Björkman (Australia) Alicia Molik	(Belgium) Justine Henin (Serbia) Ana Ivanovic	(United States) Serena Williams (Netherlands) Michaëlla Krajicek (Czech Republic) Nicole Vaidišová (Russia) Svetlana Kuznetsova

=== July ===
Week	Tournament	Champions	Runners-up	Semifinalists	Quarterfinalists
9 July	Fed Cup: Semifinals; Castellaneta Marina, Italy, Clay; Stowe, Vermont, United States, Hard	Semifinal winners Italy 3–2; Russia 3–2	Semifinal losers France; United States		
16 Jul	W&S Financial Group Women's Open; Mason, United States; Tier III event Hard – $175,000 – 32S/16Q/16D; Singles – Doubles	(Russia) Anna Chakvetadze; 6–1, 6–3	(Japan) Akiko Morigami	(India) Sania Mirza (Uzbekistan) Akgul Amanmuradova	(Russia) Elena Vesnina (Belarus) Olga Govortsova (United States) Lilia Osterloh (Switzerland) Patty Schnyder
16 Jul	W&S Financial Group Women's Open; Mason, United States; Tier III event Hard – $175,000 – 32S/16Q/16D; Singles – Doubles	(United States) Bethanie Mattek (India) Sania Mirza; 7–6^{(7–4)}, 7–5	(Russia) Alina Jidkova (Belarus) Tatiana Poutchek	(India) Sania Mirza (Uzbekistan) Akgul Amanmuradova	(Russia) Elena Vesnina (Belarus) Olga Govortsova (United States) Lilia Osterloh (Switzerland) Patty Schnyder
16 Jul	Internazionali Femminili di Palermo; Palermo, Italy; Tier IV event Clay – $145,000 – 32S/32Q/16D; Singles – Doubles	(Hungary) Ágnes Szávay; 6–0, 6–1	(Germany) Martina Müller	(Italy) Sara Errani (Italy) Karin Knapp	(Spain) Lourdes Domínguez Lino (Poland) Agnieszka Radwańska (France) Émilie Loit (Italy) Flavia Pennetta
16 Jul	Internazionali Femminili di Palermo; Palermo, Italy; Tier IV event Clay – $145,000 – 32S/32Q/16D; Singles – Doubles	(Ukraine) Mariya Koryttseva (Belarus) Darya Kustova; 6–4, 6–1	(Italy) Alice Canepa (Italy) Karin Knapp	(Italy) Sara Errani (Italy) Karin Knapp	(Spain) Lourdes Domínguez Lino (Poland) Agnieszka Radwańska (France) Émilie Loit (Italy) Flavia Pennetta
23 Jul	Bank of the West Classic; Stanford, United States; Tier II event Hard – $600,000 – 28S/32Q/16D; Singles – Doubles	(Russia) Anna Chakvetadze; 6–3, 6–2	(India) Sania Mirza	(Slovakia) Daniela Hantuchová (Austria) Sybille Bammer	(Slovenia) Katarina Srebotnik (Belarus) Olga Govortsova (Switzerland) Patty Schnyder (United States) Lilia Osterloh
23 Jul	Bank of the West Classic; Stanford, United States; Tier II event Hard – $600,000 – 28S/32Q/16D; Singles – Doubles	(India) Sania Mirza (Israel) Shahar Pe'er; 6–4, 7–6^{(7–5)}	(Belarus) Victoria Azarenka (Russia) Anna Chakvetadze	(Slovakia) Daniela Hantuchová (Austria) Sybille Bammer	(Slovenia) Katarina Srebotnik (Belarus) Olga Govortsova (Switzerland) Patty Schnyder (United States) Lilia Osterloh
23 Jul	Gastein Ladies; Bad Gastein, Austria; Tier III event Clay – $175,000 – 32S/32Q/16D; Singles – Doubles	(Italy) Francesca Schiavone; 6–1, 6–4	(Austria) Yvonne Meusburger	(Estonia) Kaia Kanepi (Italy) Karin Knapp	(Hungary) Ágnes Szávay (Czech Republic) Renata Voráčová (Spain) María José Martínez Sánchez (Spain) Lourdes Domínguez Lino
23 Jul	Gastein Ladies; Bad Gastein, Austria; Tier III event Clay – $175,000 – 32S/32Q/16D; Singles – Doubles	(Czech Republic) Lucie Hradecká (Czech Republic) Renata Voráčová; 6–3, 7–5	(Hungary) Ágnes Szávay (Czech Republic) Vladimíra Uhlířová	(Estonia) Kaia Kanepi (Italy) Karin Knapp	(Hungary) Ágnes Szávay (Czech Republic) Renata Voráčová (Spain) María José Martínez Sánchez (Spain) Lourdes Domínguez Lino
30 Jul	Acura Classic; San Diego, United States; Tier I event Hard – $1,340,000 – 56S/32Q/28D; Singles – Doubles	(Russia) Maria Sharapova; 6–2, 3–6, 6–0	(Switzerland) Patty Schnyder	(Russia) Anna Chakvetadze (Russia) Elena Dementieva	(India) Sania Mirza (United States) Venus Williams (Russia) Nadia Petrova (Russia) Maria Kirilenko
30 Jul	Acura Classic; San Diego, United States; Tier I event Hard – $1,340,000 – 56S/32Q/28D; Singles – Doubles	(Zimbabwe) Cara Black (United States) Liezel Huber; 7–5, 6–4	(Belarus) Victoria Azarenka (Russia) Anna Chakvetadze	(Russia) Anna Chakvetadze (Russia) Elena Dementieva	(India) Sania Mirza (United States) Venus Williams (Russia) Nadia Petrova (Russia) Maria Kirilenko
30 Jul	Nordea Nordic Light Open; Stockholm, Sweden; Tier IV event Hard – $145,000 – 32S/16Q/16D; Singles – Doubles	(Poland) Agnieszka Radwańska; 6–1, 6–1	(Russia) Vera Dushevina	(Germany) Julia Görges (Bulgaria) Tsvetana Pironkova	(Slovakia) Dominika Cibulková (France) Émilie Loit (France) Stéphanie Cohen-Aloro (Denmark) Caroline Wozniacki
30 Jul	Nordea Nordic Light Open; Stockholm, Sweden; Tier IV event Hard – $145,000 – 32S/16Q/16D; Singles – Doubles	(Spain) Anabel Medina Garrigues (Spain) Virginia Ruano Pascual; 6–1, 5–7, [10–6]	(Chinese Taipei) Chan Chin-Wei (Ukraine) Tetiana Luzhanska	(Germany) Julia Görges (Bulgaria) Tsvetana Pironkova	(Slovakia) Dominika Cibulková (France) Émilie Loit (France) Stéphanie Cohen-Aloro (Denmark) Caroline Wozniacki

=== August ===
Week	Tournament	Champions	Runners-up	Semifinalists	Quarterfinalists
6 Aug	East West Bank Classic; Carson, United States; Tier II event Hard – $600,000 – 56S/32Q/16D; Singles – Doubles	(Serbia) Ana Ivanovic; 7–5, 6–4	(Russia) Nadia Petrova	(Russia) Maria Sharapova (Serbia) Jelena Janković	(Russia) Elena Dementieva (France) Virginie Razzano (Russia) Maria Kirilenko (Belarus) Victoria Azarenka
6 Aug	East West Bank Classic; Carson, United States; Tier II event Hard – $600,000 – 56S/32Q/16D; Singles – Doubles	(Czech Republic) Květa Peschke (Australia) Rennae Stubbs; 6–0, 6–1	(Australia) Alicia Molik (Italy) Mara Santangelo	(Russia) Maria Sharapova (Serbia) Jelena Janković	(Russia) Elena Dementieva (France) Virginie Razzano (Russia) Maria Kirilenko (Belarus) Victoria Azarenka
13 August	Rogers Cup; Toronto, Canada; Tier I event Hard – $1,340,000 – 56S/48Q/28D; Singles – Doubles	(Belgium) Justine Henin; 7–6^{(7–3)}, 7–5	(Serbia) Jelena Janković	(China) Yan Zi (France) Tatiana Golovin	(Russia) Nadia Petrova (France) Marion Bartoli (Russia) Svetlana Kuznetsova (France) Virginie Razzano
13 August	Rogers Cup; Toronto, Canada; Tier I event Hard – $1,340,000 – 56S/48Q/28D; Singles – Doubles	(Slovenia) Katarina Srebotnik (Japan) Ai Sugiyama; 6–4, 2–6, [10–5]	(Zimbabwe) Cara Black (United States) Liezel Huber	(China) Yan Zi (France) Tatiana Golovin	(Russia) Nadia Petrova (France) Marion Bartoli (Russia) Svetlana Kuznetsova (France) Virginie Razzano
20 Aug	Pilot Pen Tennis; New Haven, United States; Tier II event Hard – $600,000 – 28S/32Q/16D; Singles – Doubles	(Russia) Svetlana Kuznetsova; 4–6, 3–0 ret.	(Hungary) Ágnes Szávay	(Russia) Elena Dementieva (Greece) Eleni Daniilidou	(Italy) Francesca Schiavone (France) Marion Bartoli (Russia) Dinara Safina (Ukraine) Alona Bondarenko
20 Aug	Pilot Pen Tennis; New Haven, United States; Tier II event Hard – $600,000 – 28S/32Q/16D; Singles – Doubles	(India) Sania Mirza (Italy) Mara Santangelo; 6–1, 6–2	(Zimbabwe) Cara Black (United States) Liezel Huber	(Russia) Elena Dementieva (Greece) Eleni Daniilidou	(Italy) Francesca Schiavone (France) Marion Bartoli (Russia) Dinara Safina (Ukraine) Alona Bondarenko
20 Aug	Forest Hills Tennis Classic; Forest Hills, United States; Tier IV event Hard – $74,800 – 16S; Singles	(Argentina) Gisela Dulko; 6–2, 6–2	(France) Virginie Razzano	(Russia) Elena Vesnina (France) Nathalie Dechy	(Japan) Akiko Morigami (Japan) Aiko Nakamura (United States) Audra Cohen (United States) Meilen Tu
27 Aug; 3 Sep	U.S. Open; New York City, United States; Grand Slam; Hard – $9,098,000 – 128S/96Q/64D/32X; Singles – Doubles – Mixed doubles	(Belgium) Justine Henin; 6–1, 6–3	(Russia) Svetlana Kuznetsova	(United States) Venus Williams (Russia) Anna Chakvetadze	(United States) Serena Williams (Serbia) Jelena Janković (Hungary) Ágnes Szávay (Israel) Shahar Pe'er
27 Aug; 3 Sep	U.S. Open; New York City, United States; Grand Slam; Hard – $9,098,000 – 128S/96Q/64D/32X; Singles – Doubles – Mixed doubles	(France) Nathalie Dechy (Russia) Dinara Safina; 6–4, 6–2	(Chinese Taipei) Chan Yung-jan (Chinese Taipei) Chuang Chia-jung	(United States) Venus Williams (Russia) Anna Chakvetadze	(United States) Serena Williams (Serbia) Jelena Janković (Hungary) Ágnes Szávay (Israel) Shahar Pe'er
27 Aug; 3 Sep	U.S. Open; New York City, United States; Grand Slam; Hard – $9,098,000 – 128S/96Q/64D/32X; Singles – Doubles – Mixed doubles	(Belarus) Max Mirnyi (Belarus) Victoria Azarenka; 6–4, 7–6^{(8–6)}	(India) Leander Paes (United States) Meghann Shaughnessy	(United States) Venus Williams (Russia) Anna Chakvetadze	(United States) Serena Williams (Serbia) Jelena Janković (Hungary) Ágnes Szávay (Israel) Shahar Pe'er

=== September ===
Week	Tournament	Champions	Runners-up	Semifinalists	Quarterfinalists
10 Sep	Fed Cup: Final; Moscow, Russia, Clay	Russia; 4–0	Italy		
10 Sep	Commonwealth Bank Tennis Classic; Bali, Indonesia; Tier III event Hard – $225,000 – 30S/16Q/16D; Singles – Doubles	(United States) Lindsay Davenport; 6–4, 3–6, 6–2	(Slovakia) Daniela Hantuchová	(Italy) Sara Errani (Romania) Sorana Cîrstea	(Serbia) Jelena Janković (Japan) Aiko Nakamura (Romania) Edina Gallovits (Japan) Ayumi Morita
10 Sep	Commonwealth Bank Tennis Classic; Bali, Indonesia; Tier III event Hard – $225,000 – 30S/16Q/16D; Singles – Doubles	(China) Ji Chunmei (China) Sun Shengnan; 6–3, 6–2	(United States) Jill Craybas (South Africa) Natalie Grandin	(Italy) Sara Errani (Romania) Sorana Cîrstea	(Serbia) Jelena Janković (Japan) Aiko Nakamura (Romania) Edina Gallovits (Japan) Ayumi Morita
17 Sep	China Open; Beijing, China; Tier II event Hard – $600,000 – 28S/32Q/16D; Singles – Doubles	(Hungary) Ágnes Szávay; 6–7^{(7–9)}, 7–5, 6–2	(Serbia) Jelena Janković	(China) Peng Shuai (United States) Lindsay Davenport	(Argentina) María Emilia Salerni (France) Amélie Mauresmo (Russia) Elena Dementieva (Japan) Akiko Morigami
17 Sep	China Open; Beijing, China; Tier II event Hard – $600,000 – 28S/32Q/16D; Singles – Doubles	(Chinese Taipei) Chuang Chia-jung (Chinese Taipei) Hsieh Su-wei; 7–6^{(7–2)}, 6–3	(China) Han Xinyun (China) Xu Yifan	(China) Peng Shuai (United States) Lindsay Davenport	(Argentina) María Emilia Salerni (France) Amélie Mauresmo (Russia) Elena Dementieva (Japan) Akiko Morigami
17 Sep	Sunfeast Open; Kolkata, India; Tier III event Hard (i) – $175,000 – 32S/16Q/16D; Singles – Doubles	(Russia) Maria Kirilenko; 6–0, 6–2	(Ukraine) Mariya Koryttseva	(United Kingdom) Anne Keothavong (Slovakia) Daniela Hantuchová	(Belarus) Tatiana Poutchek (Israel) Tzipora Obziler (Italy) Flavia Pennetta (Chinese Taipei) Chan Yung-jan
17 Sep	Sunfeast Open; Kolkata, India; Tier III event Hard (i) – $175,000 – 32S/16Q/16D; Singles – Doubles	(United States) Vania King (Russia) Alla Kudryavtseva; 6–1, 6–4	(Italy) Alberta Brianti (Ukraine) Mariya Koryttseva	(United Kingdom) Anne Keothavong (Slovakia) Daniela Hantuchová	(Belarus) Tatiana Poutchek (Israel) Tzipora Obziler (Italy) Flavia Pennetta (Chinese Taipei) Chan Yung-jan
17 Sep	Banka Koper Slovenia Open; Portorož, Slovenia; Tier IV event Hard – $145,000 – 32S/32Q/16D; Singles – Doubles	(France) Tatiana Golovin; 2–6, 6–4, 6–4	(Slovenia) Katarina Srebotnik	(Russia) Vera Dushevina (Argentina) Gisela Dulko	(United States) Meilen Tu (Russia) Vera Zvonareva (France) Émilie Loit (Austria) Sybille Bammer
17 Sep	Banka Koper Slovenia Open; Portorož, Slovenia; Tier IV event Hard – $145,000 – 32S/32Q/16D; Singles – Doubles	(Czech Republic) Lucie Hradecká (Czech Republic) Renata Voráčová; 5–7, 6–4, [10–7]	(Slovenia) Andreja Klepač (Russia) Elena Likhovtseva	(Russia) Vera Dushevina (Argentina) Gisela Dulko	(United States) Meilen Tu (Russia) Vera Zvonareva (France) Émilie Loit (Austria) Sybille Bammer
24 Sep	Fortis Championships Luxembourg; Kockelscheuer, Luxembourg; Tier II event Hard (i) – $600,000 – 28S/32Q/16D; Singles – Doubles	(Serbia) Ana Ivanovic; 3–6, 6–4, 6–4	(Slovakia) Daniela Hantuchová	(France) Marion Bartoli (Russia) Vera Zvonareva	(Russia) Anna Chakvetadze (Switzerland) Patty Schnyder (Belarus) Victoria Azarenka (France) Tatiana Golovin
24 Sep	Fortis Championships Luxembourg; Kockelscheuer, Luxembourg; Tier II event Hard (i) – $600,000 – 28S/32Q/16D; Singles – Doubles	(Czech Republic) Iveta Benešová (Slovakia) Janette Husárová; 6–4, 6–2	(Belarus) Victoria Azarenka (Israel) Shahar Pe'er	(France) Marion Bartoli (Russia) Vera Zvonareva	(Russia) Anna Chakvetadze (Switzerland) Patty Schnyder (Belarus) Victoria Azarenka (France) Tatiana Golovin
24 Sep	Guangzhou International Women's Open; Guangzhou, China; Tier III event Hard – $175,000 – 32S/16Q/16D; Singles – Doubles	(France) Virginie Razzano; 6–0, 6–3	(Israel) Tzipora Obziler	(Russia) Anastasia Rodionova (Slovakia) Dominika Cibulková	(Spain) Anabel Medina Garrigues (Romania) Ioana Raluca Olaru (Australia) Alicia Molik (Spain) Virginia Ruano Pascual
24 Sep	Guangzhou International Women's Open; Guangzhou, China; Tier III event Hard – $175,000 – 32S/16Q/16D; Singles – Doubles	(China) Peng Shuai (China) Yan Zi; 6–3, 6–4	(United States) Vania King (China) Sun Tiantian	(Russia) Anastasia Rodionova (Slovakia) Dominika Cibulková	(Spain) Anabel Medina Garrigues (Romania) Ioana Raluca Olaru (Australia) Alicia Molik (Spain) Virginia Ruano Pascual
24 Sep	Hansol Korea Open; Seoul, South Korea; Tier IV event Hard – $145,000 – 32S/32Q/16D; Singles – Doubles	(United States) Venus Williams; 6–3, 1–6, 6–4	(Russia) Maria Kirilenko	(Italy) Flavia Pennetta (Greece) Eleni Daniilidou	(Poland) Marta Domachowska (Japan) Ayumi Morita (Colombia) Catalina Castaño (Hungary) Ágnes Szávay
24 Sep	Hansol Korea Open; Seoul, South Korea; Tier IV event Hard – $145,000 – 32S/32Q/16D; Singles – Doubles	(Chinese Taipei) Chuang Chia-jung (Chinese Taipei) Hsieh Su-wei; 6–2, 6–2	(Greece) Eleni Daniilidou (Germany) Jasmin Wöhr	(Italy) Flavia Pennetta (Greece) Eleni Daniilidou	(Poland) Marta Domachowska (Japan) Ayumi Morita (Colombia) Catalina Castaño (Hungary) Ágnes Szávay

=== October ===
Week	Tournament	Champions	Runners-up	Semifinalists	Quarterfinalists
1 Oct	Porsche Tennis Grand Prix; Stuttgart, Germany; Tier II event Hard (i) – $650,000 – 28S/32Q/16D; Singles – Doubles	(Belgium) Justine Henin; 2–6, 6–2, 6–1	(France) Tatiana Golovin	(Serbia) Jelena Janković (Russia) Svetlana Kuznetsova	(Russia) Elena Dementieva (Russia) Nadia Petrova (Ukraine) Kateryna Bondarenko (United States) Serena Williams
1 Oct	Porsche Tennis Grand Prix; Stuttgart, Germany; Tier II event Hard (i) – $650,000 – 28S/32Q/16D; Singles – Doubles	(Czech Republic) Květa Peschke (Australia) Rennae Stubbs; 6–7^{(5–7)}, 7–6^{(7–4)}, [10–2]	(Chinese Taipei) Chan Yung-jan (Russia) Dinara Safina	(Serbia) Jelena Janković (Russia) Svetlana Kuznetsova	(Russia) Elena Dementieva (Russia) Nadia Petrova (Ukraine) Kateryna Bondarenko (United States) Serena Williams
1 Oct	AIG Japan Open Tennis Championships; Tokyo, Japan; Tier III event Hard – $175,000 – 32S/32Q/16D; Singles – Doubles	(France) Virginie Razzano; 4–6, 7–6^{(9–7)}, 6–4	(United States) Venus Williams	(Denmark) Caroline Wozniacki (Italy) Flavia Pennetta	(Australia) Alicia Molik (Czech Republic) Klára Zakopalová (France) Camille Pin (India) Sania Mirza
1 Oct	AIG Japan Open Tennis Championships; Tokyo, Japan; Tier III event Hard – $175,000 – 32S/32Q/16D; Singles – Doubles	(China) Sun Tiantian (China) Yan Zi; 1–6, 6–2, [10–6]	(Chinese Taipei) Chuang Chia-jung (United States) Vania King	(Denmark) Caroline Wozniacki (Italy) Flavia Pennetta	(Australia) Alicia Molik (Czech Republic) Klára Zakopalová (France) Camille Pin (India) Sania Mirza
1 Oct	Tashkent Open; Tashkent, Uzbekistan; Tier IV event Hard – $145,000 – 32S/16Q/16D; Singles draw – Doubles draw	(France) Pauline Parmentier; 7–5, 6–2	(Belarus) Victoria Azarenka	(Russia) Elena Vesnina (Belarus) Olga Govortsova	(Kyrgyzstan) Ksenia Palkina (Romania) Ioana Raluca Olaru (United Kingdom) Katie O'Brien (Uzbekistan) Akgul Amanmuradova
1 Oct	Tashkent Open; Tashkent, Uzbekistan; Tier IV event Hard – $145,000 – 32S/16Q/16D; Singles draw – Doubles draw	(Belarus) Ekaterina Dzehalevich (Belarus) Anastasiya Yakimova; 2–6, 6–4, [10–7]	(Belarus) Tatiana Poutchek (Russia) Anastasia Rodionova	(Russia) Elena Vesnina (Belarus) Olga Govortsova	(Kyrgyzstan) Ksenia Palkina (Romania) Ioana Raluca Olaru (United Kingdom) Katie O'Brien (Uzbekistan) Akgul Amanmuradova
8 Oct	Kremlin Cup; Moscow, Russia; Tier I event Hard (i) – $1,340,000 – 28S/32Q/16D; Singles – Doubles	(Russia) Elena Dementieva; 5–7, 6–1, 6–1	(United States) Serena Williams	(Russia) Svetlana Kuznetsova (Russia) Dinara Safina	(Russia) Vera Dushevina (Czech Republic) Nicole Vaidišová (Russia) Vera Zvonareva (Belarus) Victoria Azarenka
8 Oct	Kremlin Cup; Moscow, Russia; Tier I event Hard (i) – $1,340,000 – 28S/32Q/16D; Singles – Doubles	(Zimbabwe) Cara Black (United States) Liezel Huber; 4–6, 6–1, [10–7]	(Belarus) Victoria Azarenka (Belarus) Tatiana Poutchek	(Russia) Svetlana Kuznetsova (Russia) Dinara Safina	(Russia) Vera Dushevina (Czech Republic) Nicole Vaidišová (Russia) Vera Zvonareva (Belarus) Victoria Azarenka
8 Oct	PTT Bangkok Open; Bangkok, Thailand; Tier III event Hard – $200,000 – 32S/32Q/16D; Singles – Doubles	(Italy) Flavia Pennetta; 6–1, 6–3	(Chinese Taipei) Chan Yung-jan	(China) Yan Zi (United States) Venus Williams	(United States) Vania King (Poland) Urszula Radwańska (Israel) Shahar Pe'er (France) Camille Pin
8 Oct	PTT Bangkok Open; Bangkok, Thailand; Tier III event Hard – $200,000 – 32S/32Q/16D; Singles – Doubles	(China) Sun Tiantian (China) Yan Zi; Walkover	(Japan) Ayumi Morita (Japan) Junri Namigata	(China) Yan Zi (United States) Venus Williams	(United States) Vania King (Poland) Urszula Radwańska (Israel) Shahar Pe'er (France) Camille Pin
15 Oct	Zürich Open; Zürich, Switzerland; Tier I event Hard (i) – $1,340,000 – 28S/32Q/16D; Singles – Doubles	(Belgium) Justine Henin; 6–4, 6–4	(France) Tatiana Golovin	(Czech Republic) Nicole Vaidišová (Italy) Francesca Schiavone	(Poland) Agnieszka Radwańska (Ukraine) Alona Bondarenko (France) Marion Bartoli (Russia) Svetlana Kuznetsova
15 Oct	Zürich Open; Zürich, Switzerland; Tier I event Hard (i) – $1,340,000 – 28S/32Q/16D; Singles – Doubles	(Czech Republic) Květa Peschke (Australia) Rennae Stubbs; 7–5, 7–6^{(7–1)}	(United States) Lisa Raymond (Italy) Francesca Schiavone	(Czech Republic) Nicole Vaidišová (Italy) Francesca Schiavone	(Poland) Agnieszka Radwańska (Ukraine) Alona Bondarenko (France) Marion Bartoli (Russia) Svetlana Kuznetsova
22 Oct	Generali Ladies Linz; Linz, Austria; Tier II event Hard (i) – $600,000 – 28S/29Q/16D; Singles – Doubles	(Slovakia) Daniela Hantuchová; 6–4, 6–2	(Switzerland) Patty Schnyder	(France) Marion Bartoli (Czech Republic) Nicole Vaidišová	(Russia) Anna Chakvetadze (Ukraine) Julia Vakulenko (Russia) Dinara Safina (Ukraine) Alona Bondarenko
22 Oct	Generali Ladies Linz; Linz, Austria; Tier II event Hard (i) – $600,000 – 28S/29Q/16D; Singles – Doubles	(Zimbabwe) Cara Black (United States) Liezel Huber; 6–2, 3–6, [10–8]	(Slovenia) Katarina Srebotnik (Japan) Ai Sugiyama	(France) Marion Bartoli (Czech Republic) Nicole Vaidišová	(Russia) Anna Chakvetadze (Ukraine) Julia Vakulenko (Russia) Dinara Safina (Ukraine) Alona Bondarenko
29 Oct	Challenge Bell; Quebec City, Canada; Tier III event Carpet (i) – $175,000 – 32S/32Q/16D; Singles – Doubles	(United States) Lindsay Davenport; 6–4, 6–1	(Ukraine) Julia Vakulenko	(United States) Julie Ditty (Russia) Vera Zvonareva	(United States) Vania King (Belarus) Olga Govortsova (France) Stéphanie Foretz (Russia) Olga Puchkova
29 Oct	Challenge Bell; Quebec City, Canada; Tier III event Carpet (i) – $175,000 – 32S/32Q/16D; Singles – Doubles	(United States) Christina Fusano (United States) Raquel Kops-Jones; 6–2, 7–6^{(8–6)}	(Canada) Stéphanie Dubois (Czech Republic) Renata Voráčová	(United States) Julie Ditty (Russia) Vera Zvonareva	(United States) Vania King (Belarus) Olga Govortsova (France) Stéphanie Foretz (Russia) Olga Puchkova

=== November ===
Week	Tournament	Champions	Runners-up	Semifinalists	Round robin
5 Nov	WTA Tour Championships; Madrid, Spain; Year-end Championship; Hard – $3,000,000 – 8S (round robin)/4D; Singles – Doubles	(Belgium) Justine Henin; 5–7, 7–5, 6–3	(Russia) Maria Sharapova	(Serbia) Ana Ivanovic (Russia) Anna Chakvetadze	(France) Marion Bartoli (Serbia) Jelena Janković (Slovakia) Daniela Hantuchová (Russia) Svetlana Kuznetsova
5 Nov	WTA Tour Championships; Madrid, Spain; Year-end Championship; Hard – $3,000,000 – 8S (round robin)/4D; Singles – Doubles	(Zimbabwe) Cara Black (United States) Liezel Huber; 5–7, 6–3, [10–8]	(Slovenia) Katarina Srebotnik (Japan) Ai Sugiyama	(Serbia) Ana Ivanovic (Russia) Anna Chakvetadze	(France) Marion Bartoli (Serbia) Jelena Janković (Slovakia) Daniela Hantuchová (Russia) Svetlana Kuznetsova

== Statistics ==
=== Titles information ===
List of players and titles won, last name alphabetically:

- (Belgium) Justine Henin – Dubai, Doha, Warsaw, French Open, Eastbourne, Toronto, U.S. Open, Stuttgart, Zürich and WTA Tour Championships (10)
- (Russia) Anna Chakvetadze – Hobart, 's-Hertogenbosch, Cincinnati and Stanford (4)
- (Serbia) Jelena Janković – Auckland, Charleston, Rome and Birmingham (4)
- (Serbia) Ana Ivanovic – Berlin, Los Angeles and Luxembourg (3)
- (United States) Venus Williams – Memphis, Wimbledon and Seoul (3)
- (United States) Lindsay Davenport – Bali and Quebec City (2)
- (Russia) Elena Dementieva – Istanbul and Moscow (2)
- (Argentina) Gisela Dulko – Budapest and Forest Hills (2)
- (France) Tatiana Golovin – Amelia Island and Portorož (2)
- (Slovakia) Daniela Hantuchová – Indian Wells and Linz (2)
- (France) Virginie Razzano – Guangzhou and Tokyo Japan Open (2)
- (Hungary) Ágnes Szávay – Palermo and Beijing (2)
- (United States) Serena Williams – Australian Open and Key Biscayne (2)
- (Germany) Gréta Arn – Estoril (1)
- (Austria) Sybille Bammer – Pattaya City (1)
- (Belgium) Kim Clijsters – Sydney (1)
- (Switzerland) Martina Hingis – Tokyo (1)
- (Russia) Maria Kirilenko – Kolkata (1)
- (Russia) Svetlana Kuznetsova – New Haven (1)
- (France) Émilie Loit – Acapulco (1)
- (France) Amélie Mauresmo – Antwerp (1)
- (Spain) Anabel Medina Garrigues – Strasbourg (1)
- (Japan) Akiko Morigami – Prague (1)
- (France) Pauline Parmentier – Tashkent (1)
- (Italy) Flavia Pennetta – Bangkok (1)
- (Russia) Nadia Petrova – Paris (1)
- (Poland) Agnieszka Radwańska – Stockholm (1)
- (Russia) Dinara Safina – Gold Coast (1)
- (Italy) Francesca Schiavone – Bad Gastein (1)
- (Venezuela) Milagros Sequera – Fes (1)
- (Russia) Maria Sharapova – San Diego (1)
- (United States) Meghann Shaughnessy – Barcelona (1)
- (Russia) Yaroslava Shvedova – Bangalore (1)
- (Italy) Roberta Vinci – Bogotá (1)

The following players won their first title:

- (Austria) Sybille Bammer – Pattaya City
- (Russia) Yaroslava Shvedova – Bangalore
- (Italy) Roberta Vinci – Bogotá
- (France) Tatiana Golovin – Amelia Island
- (Argentina) Gisela Dulko – Budapest
- (Germany) Gréta Arn – Estoril
- (Japan) Akiko Morigami – Prague
- (Venezuela) Milagros Sequera – Fes
- (Hungary) Ágnes Szávay – Palermo
- (Italy) Francesca Schiavone – Bad Gastein
- (Poland) Agnieszka Radwańska – Stockholm
- (France) Virginie Razzano – Guangzhou
- (France) Pauline Parmentier – Tashkent

Titles won by nation:

- Russia – 12 (Gold Coast, Hobart, Paris, Bangalore, Istanbul, 's-Hertogenbosch, Cincinnati, Stanford, San Diego, New Haven, Kolkata and Moscow)
- Belgium – 11 (Sydney, Dubai, Doha, Warsaw, French Open, Eastbourne, Toronto, U.S. Open, Stuttgart, Zürich and WTA Tour Championships)
- United States – 8 (Australian Open, Memphis, Key Biscayne, Barcelona, Wimbledon, Bali, Seoul and Quebec City)
- France – 7 (Antwerp, Acapulco, Amelia Island, Portorož, Guangzhou, Tokyo Japan Open and Tashkent)
- Serbia – 7 (Auckland, Charleston, Berlin, Rome, Birmingham, Los Angeles and Luxembourg)
- Italy – 3 (Bogotá, Bad Gastein and Bangkok)
- Argentina – 2 (Budapest and Forest Hills)
- Hungary – 2 (Palermo and Beijing)
- Slovakia – 2 (Indian Wells and Linz)
- Austria – 1 (Pattaya City)
- Germany – 1 (Estoril)
- Japan – 1 (Prague)
- Poland – 1 (Stockholm)
- Spain – 1 (Strasbourg)
- Switzerland – 1 (Tokyo)
- Venezuela – 1 (Fes)

=== Titles won by nation ===
Total titles	Country	Grand Slam			Year-end		Tier I		Tier II		Tier III		Tier IV		Total		
Total titles	Country	S	D	X	S	D	S	D	S	D	S	D	S	D	S	D	X
22	USA	2				1	1	6		3	3	3	2	1	8	14	
20	Russia		1	1			2	1	3	2	6	2	1	2	12	7	1
11	Belgium	2			1		2		6						11		
11	Australia		1					5		3		1		1		11	
10	France		1	1				1	2		3		2		7	2	1
8	Serbia			1			3		2		1		1		7		1
8	Italy		1					1		2	3			1	3	5	
8	Zimbabwe		2			1		2		4						8	
8	Czech Republic							1		3		1		3		8	
6	China							1				5				6	
5	Spain										1	2		2	1	4	
5	South Africa		2							3						5	
5	Chinese Taipei									1		3		1		5	
4	Slovakia						1		1	1				1	2	2	
4	Argentina											1	2	1	2	2	
4	India									2		1		1		4	
3	Hungary								1				1	1	2	1	
3	Belarus			1										2		2	1

== Rankings ==
Singles Championship Race (5 November 2007)
Rk	Name	Nation	Points	Tour
1	Justine Henin	BEL	5,405	13
2	Jelena Janković	SRB	4,097	27
3	Svetlana Kuznetsova	RUS	3,691	18
4	Ana Ivanovic	SRB	3,163	19
5	Serena Williams	USA	2,767	11
6	Anna Chakvetadze	RUS	2,698	21
7	Venus Williams	USA	2,623	13
8	Daniela Hantuchová	SVK	2,431	26
9	Maria Sharapova	RUS	2,431	12
10	Marion Bartoli	FRA	2,224	30
11	Elena Dementieva	RUS	2,023	20
12	Dinara Safina	RUS	1,973	24
13	Nicole Vaidišová	CZE	1,942	14
14	Patty Schnyder	SUI	1,936	26
15	Tatiana Golovin	FRA	1,919	19
16	Nadia Petrova	RUS	1,864	19
17	Shahar Pe'er	ISR	1,699	22
18	Amélie Mauresmo	FRA	1,538	15
19	Sybille Bammer	AUT	1,497	26
20	Martina Hingis	SUI	1,372	14

Singles Year-end Ranking
Rk	Name	Nation	Points	Change
1	Justine Henin	BEL	6,155	+/-
2	Svetlana Kuznetsova	RUS	3,725	+2
3	Jelena Janković	SRB	3,475	+9
4	Ana Ivanovic	SRB	3,461	+10
5	Maria Sharapova	RUS	2,956	-3
6	Anna Chakvetadze	RUS	2,935	+7
7	Serena Williams	USA	2,802	+88
8	Venus Williams	USA	2,470	+38
9	Daniela Hantuchová	SVK	2,367	+8
10	Marion Bartoli	FRA	2,191	+8
11	Elena Dementieva	RUS	1,985	-3
12	Nicole Vaidišová	CZE	1,942	-2
13	Tatiana Golovin	FRA	1,882	+9
14	Nadia Petrova	RUS	1,862	-8
15	Dinara Safina	RUS	1,830	-4
16	Patty Schnyder	SUI	1,806	-7
17	Shahar Pe'er	ISR	1,675	+3
18	Amélie Mauresmo	FRA	1,538	-15
19	Martina Hingis	SUI	1,372	-12
20	Ágnes Szávay	HUN	1,331.5	+169

=== Number 1 ranking ===
Holder	Date gained	Date forfeited
Justine Henin (BEL)	Year-End 2006	28 January 2007
Maria Sharapova (RUS)	29 January 2007	18 March 2007
Justine Henin (BEL)	19 March 2007	Year-End 2007

=== Points distribution ===
Category	W	F	SF	QF	R16	R32	R64	R128	Q	Q3	Q2	Q1
Grand Slam (S)	1000	700	450	250	140	90	60	2	31	25	15	2
Grand Slam (D)	1000	700	450	250	140	90	2	–	24	–	–	–
WTA Championships (S)	750	525	335	185	105	–	–	–	–	–	–	–
WTA Championships (D)	750	525	335	185	–	–	–	–	–	–	–	–
Tier I $3,000,000 (S)	500	350	225	125	70	45	30	1	20	–	10	1
Tier I $3,000,000 (D)	500	350	225	125	70	1	–	–	–	–	–	–
Tier I $2,000,000 (S)	465	325	210	115	65	40	25	1	15	–	10	1
Tier I $2,000,000 (D)	465	325	210	115	65	1	–	–	–	–	–	–
Tier I $1,340,000 (56S)	430	300	195	110	60	35	1	–	15	–	10	1
Tier I $1,340,000 (28S/32D)	430	300	195	110	60	1	–	–	20	15	10	1
Tier I $1,340,000 (16D)	430	300	195	110	1	–	–	–	–	–	–	–
Tier II $650,000 (28S)	300	215	140	75	40	1	–	–	15	10	5	1
Tier II $650,000 (16D)	300	215	140	75	1	–	–	–	–	–	–	–
Tier II $600,000 (56S)	275	190	125	70	35	20	1	–	10	–	5	1
Tier II $600,000 (28S)	275	190	125	70	35	1	–	–	15	10	5	1
Tier II $600,000 (16D)	275	190	125	70	1	–	–	–	–	–	–	–
Tier III $225,000 (32S)	165	115	75	40	20	1	–	–	5	–	3	1
Tier III $225,000 (16D)	165	115	75	40	1	–	–	–	–	–	–	–
Tier III $175,000 (56S)	140	100	65	35	20	10	1	–	4	–	3	1
Tier III $175,000 (30/32S, 32Q)	140	100	65	35	20	1	–	–	8	4	3	1
Tier III $175,000 (30/32S, 16Q)	140	100	65	35	20	1	–	–	4	–	3	1
Tier III $175,000 (16D)	140	100	65	35	1	–	–	–	–	–	–	–
Tier IV $145,000 (32S, 32Q)	115	80	50	30	15	1	–	–	7	3	2	1
Tier IV $145,000 (32S, 16Q)	115	80	50	30	15	1	–	–	3	–	2	1
Tier IV $145,000 (16S, 16D)	115	80	50	30	1	–	–	–	–	–	–	–

== See also ==
- 2007 in tennis
- 2007 ATP Tour
