= 2007 Pattaya Women's Open =

- Date: 5–12 February
- Edition: 16th
- Category: WTA Tier IV
- Draw: 32S / 16D
- Prize money: $170,000
- Surface: Hard
- Location: Pattaya, Thailand

Champions

Singles
- (Austria) Sybille Bammer

Doubles
- (Australia) Nicole Pratt / (Italy) Mara Santangelo
← 2006 ·	Pattaya Women's Open	· 2008 →

The 2007 Pattaya Women's Open was a women's tennis tournament played on outdoor hard courts. It was the 16th edition of the PTT Pattaya Open, and was part of the WTA Tier IV tournaments of the 2007 WTA Tour. It was held in Pattaya, Thailand, from 5 February through 12 February 2007. Unseeded Sybille Bammer won the singles title.

== Finals ==
=== Singles ===
(Austria) Sybille Bammer defeated (Argentina) Gisela Dulko, 7–5, 3–6, 7–5

=== Doubles ===
(Australia) Nicole Pratt / (Italy) Mara Santangelo defeated (Chinese Taipei) Chan Yung-jan / (Chinese Taipei) Chuang Chia-jung, 6–4, 7–6^{(7–4)}

== Points and prize money ==
=== Point distribution ===
Event	W	F	SF	QF	Round of 16	Round of 32	Q	Q3	Q2	Q1
Singles	115	80	50	30	15	1	7	3	2	1
Doubles	115	80	50	30	1	—	—	—	—	—

=== Prize money ===
Event	W	F	SF	QF	Round of 16	Round of 32	Q3	Q2	Q1
Singles	$23,700	$12,775	$6,890	$3,715	$2,005	$1,075	$580	$310	$175
Doubles *	$6,690	$3,740	$2,020	$1,085	$580	—	—	—	—

_{* per team}

== Singles main-draw entrants ==
=== Seeds ===
Country	Player	Rank	Seed
FRA	Marion Bartoli	24	1
RUS	Maria Kirilenko	30	2
ITA	Mara Santangelo	41	3
CHN	Peng Shuai	42	4
IND	Sania Mirza	48	5
ARG	Gisela Dulko	51	6
RUS	Vasilisa Bardina	55	7
JPN	Aiko Nakamura	56	8

=== Other entrants ===
The following players received wildcards into the singles main draw:

- (Thailand) Montinee Tangphong
- (Ukraine) Olga Savchuk
- (Australia) Alicia Molik

The following players received entry from the qualifying draw:

- (Slovenia) Andreja Klepač
- (Israel) Tzipora Obziler
- (Thailand) Noppawan Lertcheewakarn
- (China) Yuan Meng

=== Retirements ===
- (Australia) Alicia Molik (right hamstring)

== Doubles main-draw entrants ==
=== Seeds ===
Country	Player	Country	Player	Rank	Seed
TPE	Chan Yung-jan	TPE	Chuang Chia-jung	53	1
AUS	Nicole Pratt	ITA	Mara Santangelo	94	2
UKR	Yuliana Fedak	RUS	Anastasia Rodionova	99	3
SVK	Jarmila Gajdošová	CRO	Jelena Kostanić Tošić	121	4

=== Other entrants ===
The following pairs received wildcards into the doubles main draw:

- (Slovakia) Martina Suchá / (Thailand) Napaporn Tongsalee

=== Retirements ===
- (China) Peng Shuai
