= 2006 Pattaya Women's Open – Singles =

Singles
- 2006 Pattaya Women's Open

Final
- Champion: (Israel) Shahar Pe'er
- Runner-up: (Croatia) Jelena Kostanić
- Score: 6–3, 6–1

Details
- Draw: 32
- Seeds: 8

Events
Singles	Doubles
← 2005 ·	Thailand Open	· 2007 →

Conchita Martínez was the defending champion, but did not compete this year.

Shahar Pe'er won the title by defeating Jelena Kostanić 6–3, 6–1 in the final.

== Seeds ==
1. (Russia) Vera Zvonareva (first round)
2. (Japan) Shinobu Asagoe (first round)
3. (Colombia) Catalina Castaño (quarterfinals)
4. (Israel) Shahar Pe'er (champion)
5. (Spain) Nuria Llagostera Vives (semifinals)
6. (China) Zheng Jie (first round)
7. (Japan) Aiko Nakamura (second round)
8. (Italy) Mara Santangelo (second round)

== Draw ==
=== Key ===
- Q = Qualifier
- WC = Wild card
- LL = Lucky loser
- Alt = Alternate
- SE = Special exempt
- PR = Protected ranking
- ITF = ITF entry
- JE = Junior exempt
- w/o = Walkover
- r = Retired
- d = Defaulted
- SR = Special ranking

=== Finals ===
Semifinals
(Austria) Sybille Bammer	5	3
4	(Israel) Shahar Pe'er	7	6
5	(Spain) Nuria Llagostera Vives	3	3
(Croatia) Jelena Kostanić	6	6

Final
4	(Israel) Shahar Pe'er	6	6
(Croatia) Jelena Kostanić	3	1

=== Top half ===
First round
1	(Russia) V Zvonareva	1	3
WC	(Argentina) P Suárez	6	6
WC	(Thailand) S Viratprasert	3	3
(Austria) S Bammer	6	6
WC	(Slovakia) H Nagyová	6	7
(Russia) E Bychkova	1	5
(Hungary) M Czink	6	6
6	(China) J Zheng	0	2
4	(Israel) S Pe'er	6	6
(South Korea) S-j Kim	2	4
(Thailand) T Tanasugarn	6	4	2
(Spain) M Sánchez Lorenzo	3	6	6
(Ukraine) A Bondarenko	4	3
(Spain) L Domínguez Lino	6	6
(Estonia) K Kanepi	7^{10}	3	3
7	(Japan) A Nakamura	6^{8}	6	6

Second round
WC	(Argentina) P Suárez	6	1^{r}
(Austria) S Bammer	1	0
WC	(Slovakia) H Nagyová	6	3	6^{7}
(Hungary) M Czink	2	6	7^{9}
4	(Israel) S Pe'er	7^{7}	6
(Spain) M Sánchez Lorenzo	6^{4}	3
(Spain) L Domínguez Lino	6	6
7	(Japan) A Nakamura	2	0

Quarterfinals
(Austria) S Bammer	6	6
(Hungary) M Czink	4	3
4	(Israel) S Pe'er	6	6
(Spain) L Domínguez Lino	3	2

Semifinals
(Austria) S Bammer	5	3
4	(Israel) S Pe'er	7	6

=== Bottom half ===
First round
5	(Spain) N Llagostera Vives	6	6
(Japan) R Fujiwara	1	2
Q	(Canada) A Wozniak	6	6
(China) N Li	3	1
(China) T Sun	6	6
Q	(Russia) A Kudryavtseva	3	2
LL	(Russia) A Rodionova	6	2	2
3	(Colombia) C Castaño	3	6	6
8	(Italy) M Santangelo	6	6
Q	(United States) V King	3	1
(Finland) E Laine	6	3	6
(China) Z Yan	1	6	4
(Croatia) J Kostanić	6	6
Q	(Ukraine) K Bondarenko	1	3
(Italy) ME Camerin	6	6
2	(Japan) S Asagoe	3	2

Second round
5	(Spain) N Llagostera Vives	7	6
Q	(Canada) A Wozniak	5	2
(China) T Sun	3	2
3	(Colombia) C Castaño	6	6
8	(Italy) M Santangelo	1	5
(Finland) E Laine	6	7
(Croatia) J Kostanić	6	4	7
(Italy) ME Camerin	1	6	5

Quarterfinals
5	(Spain) N Llagostera Vives	1	6	6
3	(Colombia) C Castaño	6	4	3
(Finland) E Laine	0	6	3
(Croatia) J Kostanić	6	4	6

Semifinals
5	(Spain) N Llagostera Vives	3	3
(Croatia) J Kostanić	6	6
