= 2007 Pattaya Women's Open – Singles =

Singles
- 2007 Pattaya Women's Open

Final
- Champion: (Austria) Sybille Bammer
- Runner-up: (Argentina) Gisela Dulko
- Score: 7–5, 3–6, 7–5

Details
- Draw: 32
- Seeds: 8

Events
Singles	Doubles
← 2006 ·	Pattaya Women's Open	· 2008 →

The singles Tournament at the 2007 Pattaya Women's Open took place between 5 February and 12 February on hard courts in Pattaya City, Thailand. Sybille Bammer won the title, defeating Gisela Dulko in the final.

== Singles ==
=== Seeds ===
The seeded players are listed below. Players in bold are still in the competition. The players no longer in the tournament are listed with the round in which they exited.

1. (France) Marion Bartoli (second round)
2. (Russia) Maria Kirilenko (first round)
3. (Italy) Mara Santangelo (quarterfinals)
4. (China) Peng Shuai (semifinals)
5. (India) Sania Mirza (semifinals)
6. (Argentina) Gisela Dulko (final)
7. (Russia) Vasilisa Bardina (first round)
8. (Japan) Aiko Nakamura (second round)

== Draw ==
=== Key ===
- Q = Qualifier
- WC = Wild card
- LL = Lucky loser
- Alt = Alternate
- SE = Special exempt
- PR = Protected ranking
- ITF = ITF entry
- JE = Junior exempt
- w/o = Walkover
- r = Retired
- d = Defaulted
- SR = Special ranking

=== Finals ===
Semifinals
(Austria) **Bammer**	**6**	**6**
4	(China) Peng	4	2
5	(India) Mirza	4	5
6	(Argentina) **Dulko**	**6**	**7**

Finals
(Austria) **Bammer**	**7**	3	**7**
6	(Argentina) Dulko	5	**6**	5

=== Top half ===
First round
1	(France) **Bartoli**	**6**	**6**
(Spain) Llagostera Vives	3	4
Q	(Slovenia) Klepač	5	2
(Slovakia) **Suchá**	**7**	**6**
WC	(Thailand) Tangphong	5	6^{4}
(Russia) **Rodionova**	**7**	**7^{7}**
(Austria) **Bammer**	**6**	**6**
7	(Russia) Bardina	1	4
4	(China) **Peng**	**6**	**6**
(Chinese Taipei) Hsieh	1	2
(Italy) **Oprandi**	3	**6**	**7**
WC	(Ukraine) Savchuk	**6**	4	5
(Ukraine) Fedak	2	2
Q	(Israel) **Obziler**	**6**	**6**
Q	(Thailand) Lertcheewakarn	**6**	3	1
8	(Japan) **Nakamura**	3	**6**	**6**

Second round
1	(France) Bartoli	**6**	3	3
(Slovakia) **Suchá**	4	**6**	**6**
(Russia) Rodionova	2	5
(Austria) **Bammer**	**6**	**7**
4	(China) **Peng**	6	**6**	**6**
(Italy) Oprandi	**7**	1	3
Q	(Israel) **Obziler**	3	**6**	**6**
8	(Japan) Nakamura	**6**	1	1

Quarterfinals
(Slovakia) Suchá	**6**	3	3
(Austria) **Bammer**	3	**6**	**6**
4	(China) **Peng**	**6**	**6**
Q	(Israel) Obziler	3	2

Finals
(Austria) **Bammer**	**6**	**6**
4	(China) Peng	4	2

=== Bottom half ===
First round
5	(India) **Mirza**	**7^{7}**	**6**
(Colombia) Castaño	6^{1}	0
(Thailand) **Tanasugarn**	**6**	6^{4}	**6**
(Chinese Taipei) Chan	2	**7^{7}**	4
(Russia) **Kudryavtseva**	1	**6**	**6**
Q	(China) Yuan	**6**	1	3
(Slovakia) Gajdošová	4	**7**	2
3	(Italy) **Santangelo**	**6**	5	**6**
6	(Argentina) **Dulko**	**6**	**6**
(China) Sun	4	1
WC	(Australia) **Molik**	**6**	**6**
(Ukraine) Bondarenko	2	2
(United States) **King**	**6**	**6**
(Croatia) Kostanić Tošić	1	3
(Australia) **Pratt**	**7^{7}**	2	**7**
2	(Russia) Kirilenko	6^{1}	**6**	5

Second round
5	(India) **Mirza**	**6**	2	**6**
(Thailand) Tanasugarn	4	**6**	1
(Russia) Kudryavtseva	2	4
3	(Italy) **Santangelo**	**6**	**6**
6	(Argentina) **Dulko**	w/o
WC	(Australia) Molik
(United States) King	2	4
(Australia) **Pratt**	**6**	**6**

Quarterfinals
5	(India) **Mirza**	**6**	**7**
3	(Italy) Santangelo	4	6
6	(Argentina) **Dulko**	**6**	**6**
(Australia) Pratt	2	3

Finals
5	(India) Mirza	4	5
6	(Argentina) **Dulko**	**6**	**7**

== Qualifying ==
=== Seeds ===
The seeded players are listed below. Players in bold have qualified. The players no longer in the tournament are listed with the round in which they exited.

1. (Hungary) Melinda Czink (Qualifying)
2. (Japan) Erika Takao (second round)
3. (Israel) **Tzipora Obziler**
4. (China) **Meng Yuan**
5. (Chinese Taipei) Chan Chin-wei (second round)
6. (Australia) Sophie Ferguson (Qualifying)
7. (Slovenia) **Andreja Klepač**
8. (United States) Carly Gullickson (second round)

The four qualifiers were:

1. **(Thailand) Noppawan Lertcheewakarn**
2. **(Slovenia) Andreja Klepač**
3. **(Israel) Tzipora Obziler**
4. **(China) Meng Yuan**

=== Draw ===
==== Group 1 ====
First round
1	(Hungary) **Czink**	6^{5}	**6**	**6**
(Thailand) Tongsalee	**7^{7}**	3	3
WC	(Thailand) Vitayaviroj	4	3
(Uzbekistan) **Amanmuradova**	**6**	**6**
WC	(Thailand) **Lertcheewakarn**	1	**7^{7}**	**6**
(India) S. Uberoi	**6**	6^{3}	2
(India) Appineni	0	0
5	(Chinese Taipei) **Chan**	**6**	**6**

Second round
1	(Hungary) **Czink**	**6**	**6**
(Uzbekistan) Amanmuradova	2	4
WC	(Thailand) **Lertcheewakarn**	**6**	**6**
5	(Chinese Taipei) Chan	1	4

Qualifying
1	(Hungary) Czink	4	2
WC	(Thailand) **Lertcheewakarn**	**6**	**6**

==== Group 2 ====
First round
2	(Japan) **Takao**	**6**	**6**
(Indonesia) Damayanti	3	1
(China) **Sun**	**6**	**6**
WC	(Thailand) Rungtein	1	0
(Kazakhstan) **Rakhim**	**6**	**6**
(China) Zhang	4	2
(Indonesia) Gumulya	3	2
7	(Slovenia) **Klepač**	**6**	**6**

Second round
2	(Japan) Takao	**6**	1	6^{3}
(China) **Sun**	0	**6**	**7^{7}**
(Kazakhstan) Rakhim	5	1
7	(Slovenia) **Klepač**	**7**	**6**

Qualifying
(China) Sun	3	6^{4}
7	(Slovenia) **Klepač**	**6**	**7^{7}**

==== Group 3 ====
First round
3	(Israel) **Obziler**	**6**	**6**
WC	(Thailand) Wongteanchai	0	1
(China) **Ren**	**6**	6^{5}	**6**
WC	(Indonesia) Tananta	1	**7^{7}**	2
(China) Chen	2	3
(Thailand) **Luangnam**	**6**	**6**
(Japan) Yonemura	2	3
8	(United States) **Gullickson**	**6**	**6**

Second round
3	(Israel) **Obziler**	**6**	**6**
(China) Ren	2	1
(Thailand) **Luangnam**	**7**	4	**6**
8	(United States) Gullickson	5	**6**	4

Qualifying
3	(Israel) **Obziler**	**7^{7}**	**6**
(Thailand) Luangnam	6^{0}	1

==== Group 4 ====
First round
4	(China) **Yuan**	**6**	**6**
(Japan) Iijima	1	3
(United States) **N. Uberoi**	**7^{7}**	**6**
(Chinese Taipei) Hwang	6^{5}	4
(Japan) **Sema**	**6**	**7^{7}**
(China) Ji	4	6^{5}
(Japan) Yonemura	2	3
6	(Australia) **Ferguson**	**6**	**6**

Second round
4	(China) **Yuan**	**6**	**6**
(United States) N. Uberoi	1	2
(Japan) Sema	3	4
6	(Australia) **Ferguson**	**6**	**6**

Qualifying
4	(China) **Yuan**	**6**	**6**
6	(Australia) Ferguson	2	4
