= 2007 Pattaya Women's Open – Doubles =

Doubles
- 2007 Pattaya Women's Open

Final
- Champion: (Australia) Nicole Pratt (Italy) Mara Santangelo
- Runner-up: (Chinese Taipei) Chan Yung-jan (Chinese Taipei) Chuang Chia-jung
- Score: 6–4, 7–6^{(7–4)}

Details
- Draw: 16
- Seeds: 4

Events
Singles	Doubles
← 2006 ·	Pattaya Women's Open	· 2008 →

Li Ting and Sun Tiantian were the defending champions, but Li did not compete that year.

Sun partnering Ji Chunmei lost in the semifinals.

== Seeds ==
1. (Chinese Taipei) Chan Yung-jan
  (Chinese Taipei) Chuang Chia-jung (final)
2. (Australia) Nicole Pratt
  (Italy) Mara Santangelo (champions)
3. (Ukraine) Yuliana Fedak
  (Russia) Anastassia Rodionova (quarterfinals)
4. (Slovakia) Jarmila Gajdošová
  (Croatia) Jelena Kostanić Tošić (semifinals)

== Draw ==
=== Key ===
- Q = Qualifier
- WC = Wild card
- LL = Lucky loser
- Alt = Alternate
- SE = Special exempt
- PR = Protected ranking
- ITF = ITF entry
- JE = Junior exempt
- w/o = Walkover
- r = Retired
- d = Defaulted
- SR = Special ranking

=== Draw ===
First round
1	(Chinese Taipei) Y-j Chan (Chinese Taipei) C-j Chuang	6	6
WC	(Slovakia) M Suchá (Thailand) N Tongsalee	1	1
(Chinese Taipei) S-w Hsieh (Russia) A Kudryavtseva	4	6	[10]
(Ukraine) K Bondarenko (Thailand) T Tanasugarn	6	3	[12]
3	(Ukraine) Y Fedak (Russia) A Rodionova	7^{7}	4	[10]
(Chinese Taipei) C-w Chan (United States) C Gullickson	6^{4}	6	[8]
(China) C Ji (China) T Sun	6	3
(Colombia) C Castaño (China) S Peng	1	1^{r}
(United States) N Uberoi (India) S Uberoi	4	4
(Russia) V Bardina (Italy) R Oprandi	6	6
(Austria) S Bammer (Hungary) M Czink	0	6^{6}
4	(Slovakia) J Gajdošová (Croatia) J Kostanić Tošić	6	7^{8}
(China) S Sun (China) S Zhang	6	5	[11]
(Uzbekistan) A Amanmuradova (Slovenia) A Klepač	4	7	[9]
(Australia) A Molik (Australia) B Stewart	2	0
2	(Australia) N Pratt (Italy) M Santangelo	6	6

Quarterfinals
1	(Chinese Taipei) Y-j Chan (Chinese Taipei) C-j Chuang	7	4	[10]
(Ukraine) K Bondarenko (Thailand) T Tanasugarn	5	6	[7]
3	(Ukraine) Y Fedak (Russia) A Rodionova	2	1
(China) C Ji (China) T Sun	6	6
(Russia) V Bardina (Italy) R Oprandi	3	6	[9]
4	(Slovakia) J Gajdošová (Croatia) J Kostanić Tošić	6	3	[11]
(China) S Sun (China) S Zhang	3	3
2	(Australia) N Pratt (Italy) M Santangelo	6	6

Semifinals
1	(Chinese Taipei) Y-j Chan (Chinese Taipei) C-j Chuang	6	7^{7}
(China) C Ji (China) T Sun	2	6^{5}
4	(Slovakia) J Gajdošová (Croatia) J Kostanić Tošić	5	6	[4]
2	(Australia) N Pratt (Italy) M Santangelo	7	3	[10]

Finals
1	(Chinese Taipei) Y-j Chan (Chinese Taipei) C-j Chuang	4	6^{4}
2	(Australia) N Pratt (Italy) M Santangelo	6	7^{7}

=== Notes ===
- The winners will receive $6,960 and 115 ranking points.
- The runners-up will receive $3,740 and 80 ranking points.
- The last direct acceptance team was Vasilisa Bardina and Romina Oprandi (combined ranking of 390st).
- The player representative was Aiko Nakamura.
