= 2006 Pattaya Women's Open – Doubles =

Doubles
- 2006 Pattaya Women's Open

Final
- Champions: (China) Li Ting (China) Sun Tiantian
- Runners-up: (China) Yan Zi (China) Zheng Jie
- Score: 3–6, 6–1, 7–6^{(7–5)}

Details
- Draw: 16
- Seeds: 4

Events
| Singles | Doubles |
| ← 2005 · | Thailand Open | · 2007 → |

Marion Bartoli and Anna-Lena Grönefeld were the defending champions, but none competed this year as both were in Paris at the same week.

Li Ting and Sun Tiantian won the title by defeating Yan Zi and Zheng Jie 3–6, 6–1, 7–6^{(7–5)} in the final.

== Seeds ==
1. (China) Yan Zi / (China) Zheng Jie (final)
2. (China) Li Ting / (China) Sun Tiantian (champions)
3. (Ukraine) Mariya Koryttseva / (Spain) Nuria Llagostera Vives (quarterfinals)
4. (Israel) Shahar Pe'er / (Australia) Nicole Pratt (quarterfinals)

== Draw ==
=== Key ===
- Q = Qualifier
- WC = Wild card
- LL = Lucky loser
- Alt = Alternate
- SE = Special exempt
- PR = Protected ranking
- ITF = ITF entry
- JE = Junior exempt
- w/o = Walkover
- r = Retired
- d = Defaulted
- SR = Special ranking

=== Draw ===
First round
1 | (China) Z Yan (China) J Zheng | 6 | 6
(Uzbekistan) A Amanmuradova (Russia) A Rodionova | 2 | 2
(Indonesia) W Prakusya (Indonesia) A Widjaja | 4 | 2
(China) N Li (United States) B Mattek | 6 | 6
4 | (Israel) S Pe'er (Australia) N Pratt | 6 | 3 | 6
(Japan) R Fujiwara (Croatia) S Talaja | 3 | 6 | 1
Q | (Colombia) C Castaño (Hungary) M Czink | 6^{4} | 3
(Chinese Taipei) S-w Hsieh (Thailand) T Tanasugarn | 7^{7} | 6
(Italy) ME Camerin (Italy) M Santangelo | 6^{5} | 6 | 6
(Croatia) J Kostanić (Slovakia) H Nagyová | 7^{7} | 1 | 2
(Spain) L Domínguez Lino (Spain) M Sánchez Lorenzo | 3 | 7^{7} | 3
3 | (Ukraine) M Koryttseva (Spain) L Llagostera Vives | 6 | 6^{5} | 6
(Germany) M Müller (United States) L Osterloh | 2 | 4
(Japan) S Asagoe (Japan) A Nakamura | 6 | 6
WC | (Israel) T Obziler (Thailand) N Tongsalee | 4 | 3
2/PR | (China) T Li (China) T Sun | 6 | 6

Quarterfinals
1 | (China) Z Yan (China) J Zheng | 6 | 6
(China) N Li (United States) B Mattek | 4 | 2
4 | (Israel) S Pe'er (Australia) N Pratt | 1 | 1
(Chinese Taipei) S-w Hsieh (Thailand) T Tanasugarn | 6 | 6
(Italy) ME Camerin (Italy) M Santangelo | 5 | 6 | 6
3 | (Ukraine) M Koryttseva (Spain) L Llagostera Vives | 7 | 2 | 2
(Japan) S Asagoe (Japan) A Nakamura | 6 | 4 | 2
2/PR | (China) T Li (China) T Sun | 3 | 6 | 6

Semifinals
1 | (China) Z Yan (China) J Zheng | 6 | 7
(Chinese Taipei) S-w Hsieh (Thailand) T Tanasugarn | 2 | 5
(Italy) ME Camerin (Italy) M Santangelo | 5 | 3
2/PR | (China) T Li (China) T Sun | 7 | 6

Final
1 | (China) Z Yan (China) J Zheng | 6 | 1 | 6^{5}
2/PR | (China) T Li (China) T Sun | 3 | 6 | 7^{7}
