= 2006 Pattaya Women's Open =

- Date: 6–12 February
- Edition: 15th
- Category: WTA Tier IV
- Draw: 32S / 16D
- Prize money: US$170,000
- Surface: Hard
- Location: Pattaya, Thailand

Champions

Singles
- (Israel) Shahar Pe'er

Doubles
- (China) Li Ting / (China) Sun Tiantian
- Thailand Open

The 2006 Pattaya Women's Open was a women's tennis tournament played on outdoor hard courts. It was the 15th edition of the PTT Pattaya Open, and was part of the WTA Tier IV tournaments of the 2006 WTA Tour. It was held in Pattaya, Thailand, from 6 February until 12 February 2007. Fourth-seeded Shahar Pe'er won the singles title.

== Finals ==
=== Singles ===
(Israel) Shahar Pe'er defeated (Croatia) Jelena Kostanić, 6–3, 6–1.

- It was the 1st singles title of Pe'er in her career.

=== Doubles ===
(China) Li Ting / (China) Sun Tiantian defeated (China) Yan Zi / (China) Zheng Jie, 3–6, 6–1, 7–6^{(7–5)}

- It was the 8th title for Li and the 7th title for Sun in their respective doubles careers.

== Points and prize money ==
=== Point distribution ===
Event	W	F	SF	QF	Round of 16	Round of 32	Q	Q3	Q2	Q1
Singles	95	67	43	24	12	1	5.5	3.5	2	1
Doubles	95	67	43	24	1	—N/a	6.25	—N/a	—N/a	—N/a

=== Prize money ===
Event	W	F	SF	QF	Round of 16	Round of 32	Q3	Q2	Q1
Singles	$25,650	$13,825	$7,450	$4,015	$2,165	$1,165	$630	$340	$185
Doubles *	$7,530	$4,050	$2,180	$1,175	$630	—N/a	—N/a	—N/a	—N/a

_{* per team}

== Singles main draw entrants ==
=== Seeds ===
Country	Player	Rank	Seed
RUS	Vera Zvonareva	30	1
JPN	Shinobu Asagoe	38	2
COL	Catalina Castaño	41	3
ISR	Shahar Pe'er	43	4
ESP	Nuria Llagostera Vives	49	5
CHN	Zheng Jie	52	6
JPN	Aiko Nakamura	54	7
ITA	Mara Santangelo	57	8

=== Other entrants ===
The following players received wildcards into the singles main draw:

- (Slovakia) Henrieta Nagyová
- (Argentina) Paola Suárez
- (Thailand) Suchanun Viratprasert

The following players received entry from the qualifying draw:

- (Ukraine) Kateryna Bondarenko
- (United States) Vania King
- (Russia) Alla Kudryavtseva
- (Canada) Aleksandra Wozniak

The following player received entry as a lucky loser:

- (Russia) Anastasia Rodionova

=== Withdrawals ===
- (Australia) Samantha Stosur (right toe sprain) → replaced by Rodionova

=== Retirements ===
- (Argentina) Paola Suárez (right calf strain)

== Doubles main draw entrants ==
=== Seeds ===
Country	Player	Country	Player	Rank	Seed
CHN	Yan Zi	TPE	Zheng Jie	27	1
CHN	Li Ting	CHN	Sun Tiantian	77	2
UKR	Mariya Koryttseva	ESP	Nuria Llagostera Vives	112	3
ISR	Shahar Pe'er	AUS	Nicole Pratt	116	4

=== Other entrants ===
The following pair received wildcards into the doubles main draw:

- (Israel) Tzipora Obziler / (Thailand) Napaporn Tongsalee

The following pair received entry from the qualifying draw:

- (Colombia) Catalina Castaño / (Hungary) Melinda Czink
