= Sybille Bammer =

Austrian tennis player

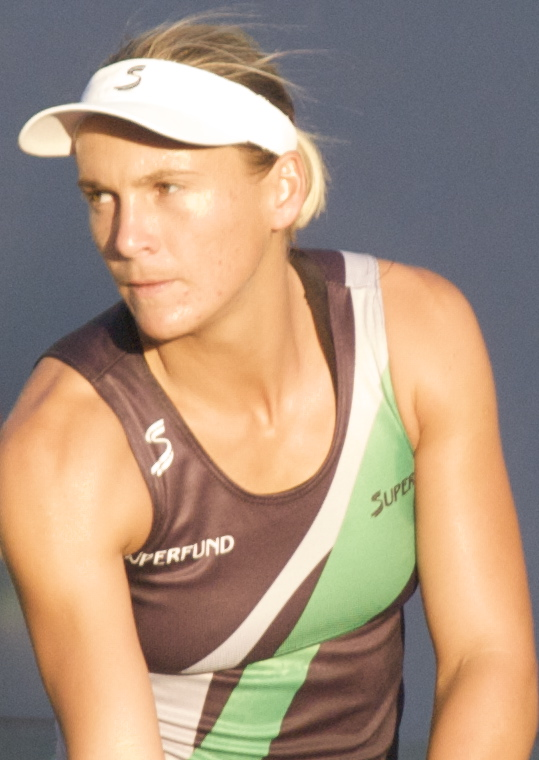
- Bammer at the 2009 US Open
- Country (sports): Austria
- Residence: Linz, Austria
- Born: 27 April 1980 (age 45) Linz
- Height: 1.74 m (5 ft 9 in)
- Turned pro: 1997
- Retired: 2011
- Plays: Left-handed (two-handed backhand)
- Prize money: $2,108,725

Singles
- Career record: 338–300
- Career titles: 2 WTA, 9 ITF
- Highest ranking: No. 19 (17 December 2007)

Grand Slam singles results
- Australian Open: 3R (2006)
- French Open: 4R (2007)
- Wimbledon: 3R (2006)
- US Open: QF (2008)

Doubles
- Career record: 31–88
- Career titles: 0 WTA, 1 ITF
- Highest ranking: No. 236 (15 January 2007)

Grand Slam doubles results
- Australian Open: 1R (2006, 2007, 2008)
- French Open: 2R (2006)
- Wimbledon: 1R (2006, 2007, 2008, 2009)
- US Open: 1R (2006, 2007, 2008)

Sybille Bammer (born 27 April 1980) is a former professional tennis player from Austria. Her career-high ranking is No. 19, which she achieved on 17 December 2007.

She was one of three mothers on the WTA Tour, having taken time off at age 21 to have her daughter Tina before returning to the tour. When she won the 2007 Pattaya Open, it was the first time in 18 years that a mother won on tour, after Laura Arraya in 1989.

== Tennis career ==
Born in Linz, Bammer made her WTA Tour main-draw debut as a wildcard in 2000 at the Klagenfurt event where she lost to German player Andrea Glass. She failed to qualify for Wimbledon, the US Open and her home tournament in Linz.

During 2001 she took a break from tennis to give birth to her daughter, Tina. Ranked No. 238 at the time of her retirement, she believed her tennis career was over. She stayed in the Austrian village of Ottensheim for a year to care for her daughter. The baby's father, boyfriend Christophe Gschwendtner, offered to take a break from his engineering career to take care of Tina so that Bammer could return to the tour.

Upon her post-pregnancy comeback in 2002 she cruised to win her first career singles title at the $10k event in Grenoble. She won another two in the same year at Mostar and Innsbruck, both $25k events on the ITF Circuit. During 2003, she picked up another four $25k singles titles. She also made her debut for Austria in their Fed Cup team.

Her daughter, Tina, was a frequent regular in the crowd. Bammer said of her daughter, "She is always telling other people to be quiet because mommy is concentrating."

In 2005, Bammer made her career breakthrough, soaring into the top 100 in the rankings, including making her Grand Slam main draw debut at the US Open, where she fell in the first round to Martina Suchá as a qualifier. At the Tier-III event in Kolkata, Bammer reached her first-ever WTA quarterfinal event, and then reached her second at the Tier-II event in Linz as a wildcard, defeating Virginie Razzano and Vera Dushevina. She was the first Austrian since Barbara Schett in 2000 to make it to the quarterfinals there. After her impressive run in Linz, she reached a new career-high of No. 77.

At the start of 2006, she achieved her best-ever Grand Slam performance in only her second-ever Grand Slam main draw, making the third round. Two weeks later, she reached her first WTA Tour semifinal at Pattaya City, falling to eventual champion Shahar Pe'er. She reached the third round in Indian Wells before losing to 19th seed Martina Hingis, and the second round in Charleston, losing to top seed Justine Henin-Hardenne. During the Fed Cup, she fell 0–3 in Austria's 5–0 defeat to Spain.

She made her top-50 debut at No. 42 following a third-round appearance at Berlin, losing to sixth seed Svetlana Kuznetsova. In her first Wimbledon main-draw showing, she reached the third round, notching her best career win thus far over Nathalie Dechy, then ranked No. 23. This was followed by a poor U.S. hardcourt season, falling in the first round at four events and reaching the second round in three, including the US Open. She then reached her third career quarterfinal in Bangkok, once again beating Nathalie Dechy before falling to Tamarine Tanasugarn, the eventual runner-up. She finished the season ranked No. 53, her best year-ending ranking thus far.

=== 2007 ===
After losing in the first round of Gold Coast to eventual runner-up Martina Hingis, 0–6, 2–6, the following week at Hobart, a Tier-IV event, she raised several eyebrows by issuing a quarterfinal defeat to then eight-time Grand Slam champion Serena Williams, who was playing her first tournament since the US Open. With this victory, she became one of the very small number of players that have a winning head-to-head record over Williams. She lost easily in the semifinals to Vasilisa Bardina, 3–6, 1–6. She then lost 4–6, 5–7 in the first round of the Australian Open to Anna Chakvetadze, after leading 5–2 in the second set.

In February 2007, she finally won her first WTA Tour title ten years after turning professional, beating Vasilisa Bardina in the first round to avenge her semifinal loss to her at Hobart, Anastasia Rodionova, Martina Suchá, Peng Shuai and topping it off with a victory over Gisela Dulko in the final, saving three match points en route to victory.

At Indian Wells, she became the No. 33 seed after Elena Dementieva withdrew. She made the most of her luck, stunning everyone by making the semifinals of the Tier I event, her first-ever semifinal at this level. In the fourth round, she stunned No. 10 seed Ana Ivanovic, and beat No. 13 seed Tatiana Golovin in the quarterfinals. Unfortunately, her fairytale came to an end in the semifinals losing to Svetlana Kuznetsova, the second seed, with a result of 7–6, 4–6, 1–6. Due to this amazing run, she rose to a new career high of No. 30.

She lost early in Miami to tricky French left-hander Émilie Loit, and then moved onto the green clay of Amelia Island. She had another brilliant run here, beating Daniela Hantuchová in the quarterfinals but then lost to the eventual runner-up Nadia Petrova in the semifinals. This meant that she reached another career high, moving up to No. 26 in the world. She reached the third round of Charleston, losing to surprise quarterfinalist Michaëlla Krajicek, but nevertheless made her top 25 debut at No. 25.

She played for Austria in the Fed Cup against Australia at the end of April. She ended with a 2–0 record after winning both of her singles matches against Samantha Stosur and Alicia Molik as Austria won 4–1. Her first tournament of May was the German Open, where she lost to Kuznetsova in the second round. She then went to the second round of the Rome Masters, losing to Hantuchová 1–6, 2–6.

At the time of the French Open, she was ranked 25 in the world and entered the tournament as the 20th seed. She beat Roberta Vinci (6–4, 6–4), Olga Savchuk (6–0, 6–3) and 16th seed Li Na (6–4, 6–3) to record her best performance at a Grand Slam to date. Unfortunately, she was defeated by top seed, world number one, and eventual champion Justine Henin 6–2, 6–4 in the French Open fourth round. Nonetheless, it capped a breakthrough Grand Slam for Sybille, and resulted in a new career high of world No. 22 for her.

In her first grass-court tournament, the Eastbourne International, she won through to the third round, only to be beaten in three tight sets by Nadia Petrova. At Wimbledon, Bammer lost in the second round to Laura Granville 1–6, 4–6.

Since her daughter was starting school in Austria in September 2007, Bammer decided to plan her season so that she would never be away from home for more than a month at any one time.

In the Stanford Classic, she was defeated in three sets by unseeded Sania Mirza in the semifinals.

In the final staging of the Acura Classic, she made it to round 2 before losing to Ai Sugiyama. Nevertheless, she made her top-20 debut afterwards.

At the 2007 US Open, Bammer made it all the way to the fourth round, equaling her best Grand Slam performance to date. Along the way, she defeated 2004 finalist Elena Dementieva handily 6–1, 6–2, before losing to Jelena Janković in three sets.

Bammer finished 2007 at No. 19 in the world and as the highest ranked Austrian woman.

=== 2008 ===
Bammer started the season by competing in the Mondial Australian Women's Hardcourts in the Gold Coast. She was the seventh seed but lost to eventual champion Li Na in a close match, 6–4, 4–6, 6–4. She then got her first win over Nadia Petrova in the first round of the Sydney International in straight sets, 7–5, 6–3, before losing to Katarina Srebotnik.

Sybille was the 19th seed at the Australian Open. She defeated Tamarine Tanasugarn 6–7, 6–4, 6–2 in the first round, before losing easily to Hsieh Su-wei 2–6, 0–6. She lost in the first round of the Proximus Diamond Games in Antwerp to Yaroslava Shvedova.

At the Qatar Open, Bammer made her first ever Tier-I quarterfinal and scored the biggest win of her career over world No. 2, Svetlana Kuznetsova. It was also her first ever top ten win. Her run was ended by eventual runner-up, Vera Zvonareva, 2–6, 6–2, 6–0. She followed it up by reaching the second round in Dubai, losing to Francesca Schiavone.

At the Bangalore Open, she lost in the second round to Anastasia Rodionova 7–6, 6–2, after holding a 5–2 lead in the first set.

Bammer reached the quarterfinals at the Beijing Olympics, where she lost in three sets to ninth seed Vera Zvonareva, 3–6, 6–3, 3–6.

At the US Open, Bammer was seeded 29th when she defeated No. 12, Marion Bartoli, 7–6, 0–6, 6–4 in the fourth round. She struggled with unforced errors in a loss to No. 2, Jelena Janković, in the quarterfinals.

=== 2009 ===
Was seeded at the Australian Open but lost in the first round.

At the French Open, as the 28th seed, she defeated Nathalie Dechy in the first round 3–6, 6–4, 6–1, before losing to Melinda Czink 6–4, 3–6, 8–10. Partnering Łukasz Kubot of Poland in the mixed doubles draw, she won two matches and they made it through to the quarterfinals.

At Wimbledon, she was the 29th seed but lost in the first round to Melanie Oudin, 6–7, 0–6.

At Cincinnati, she defeated No. 13 seed Agnieszka Radwańska 6–0, 7–5 and second seed Serena Williams en-route 7–5, 6–4 (now 2–0 lifetime against her), falling to No. 5 seed and eventual champion Janković.

At the US Open, as the 28th seed, she lost in the first round to Maria Martinez Sanchez, 2–6, 6–4, 1–6.

=== 2010–11 ===
Bammer reached the second round at the Australian Open, losing 2–6, 5–7 to Venus Williams. She reached semifinals at Kuala Lumpur but lost to top seed Elena Dementieva.

Bammer retired, after playing at the 2011 Gastein Ladies, her last professional tournament.

She has a 2–0 head-to-head record against Serena Williams, making her one of the few players to have a winning record against the Serena.

== WTA career finals ==
=== Singles: 2 (2 titles) ===
Legend: Before 2009	Legend: Starting in 2009
Grand Slam
Tier I	Premier Mandatory
Tier II	Premier 5
Tier III	Premier
Tier IV & V (1)	International (1)

Outcome	No.	Date	Tournament	Surface	Opponent	Score
Winner	1.	11 February 2007	Pattaya Open, Thailand	Hard	(Argentina) Gisela Dulko	7–5, 3–6, 7–5
Winner	2.	19 July 2009	Prague Open, Czech Republic	Clay	(Italy) Francesca Schiavone	7–6^{(4)}, 6–2

== ITF finals ==
$50,000 tournaments
$25,000 tournaments
$10,000 tournaments

=== Singles: 13 (9–4) ===
Outcome	No.	Date	Tournament	Surface	Opponent	Score
Runner-up	1.	4 October 1998	ITF Caracas, Venezuela	Hard	(Israel) Nataly Cahana	1–6, 6–3, 3–6
Runner-up	2.	17 October 1999	ITF Brisbane, Australia	Hard	(China) Yi Jing-Qian	4–6, 1–6
Winner	1.	27 January 2002	ITF Grenoble, France	Hard	(France) Virginie Pichet	6–4, 6–4
Winner	2.	2 June 2002	ITF Mostar, Bosnia and Herzegovina	Clay	(Slovakia) Zuzana Kučová	2–6, 6–4, 7–5
Winner	3.	18 August 2002	ITF Innsbruck, Austria	Clay	(Czech Republic) Barbora Strýcová	6–2, 6–3
Runner-up	3.	5 October 2003	ITF Porto, Portugal	Clay	(France) Séverine Beltrame	2–6, 3–6
Winner	4.	12 October 2003	ITF Jersey, Great Britain	Hard (i)	(Sweden) Sofia Arvidsson	7–6^{(1)}, 6–2
Winner	5.	19 October 2003	ITF Cardiff, Great Britain	Hard (i)	(Russia) Irina Bulykina	6–0, 6–2
Winner	6.	2 November 2003	ITF Nottingham, Great Britain	Hard (i)	(Belgium) Kirsten Flipkens	6–4, 3–6, 6–2
Winner	7.	21 December 2003	ITF Valašské Meziříčí, Czech Republic	Hard	(Czech Republic) Lucie Šafářová	6–4, 6–1
Runner-up	4.	10 October 2004	ITF Glasgow, Great Britain	Hard (i)	(Estonia) Margit Rüütel	6–3, 1–6, 5–7
Winner	8.	26 June 2005	ITF Fontanafredda, Italy	Clay	(Italy) Alice Canepa	7–6^{(3)}, 6–2
Winner	9.	21 August 2005	ITF Bronx, United States	Hard	(France) Camille Pin	3–6, 6–4, 6–4

=== Doubles: 2 (1–1) ===
Outcome	No.	Date	Tournament	Surface	Partner	Opponents	Score
Runner-up	1.	5 May 2002	ITF Warsaw, Poland	Clay (i)	(Austria) Isabella Mitterlehner	(Czech Republic) Iveta Gerlová (Germany) Christiane Hoppmann	4–6, 2–6
Winner	1.	5 October 2003	ITF Porto, Portugal	Clay	(Italy) Laura Dell'Angelo	(Czech Republic) Iveta Gerlová (Canada) Marie-Ève Pelletier	6–3, 7–5

== Grand Slam singles performance timeline ==
Key
W	F	SF	QF	#R	RR	Q#	DNQ	A	NH

(W) winner; (F) finalist; (SF) semifinalist; (QF) quarterfinalist; (#R) rounds 4, 3, 2, 1; (RR) round-robin stage; (Q#) qualification round; (DNQ) did not qualify; (A) absent; (NH) not held; (SR) strike rate (events won / competed); (W–L) win–loss record.

Tournament	2005	2006	2007	2008	2009	2010	2011	W–L
Australian Open	A	3R	1R	2R	1R	2R	1R	4–6
French Open	A	1R	4R	1R	2R	2R	1R	5–6
Wimbledon	A	3R	2R	2R	1R	1R	1R	4–6
US Open	1R	2R	4R	QF	1R	2R	A	9–6
Win–loss	0–1	5–4	7–4	6–4	1–4	3–4	0–3	22–24
