= Vasilisa Bardina =

Russian tennis player

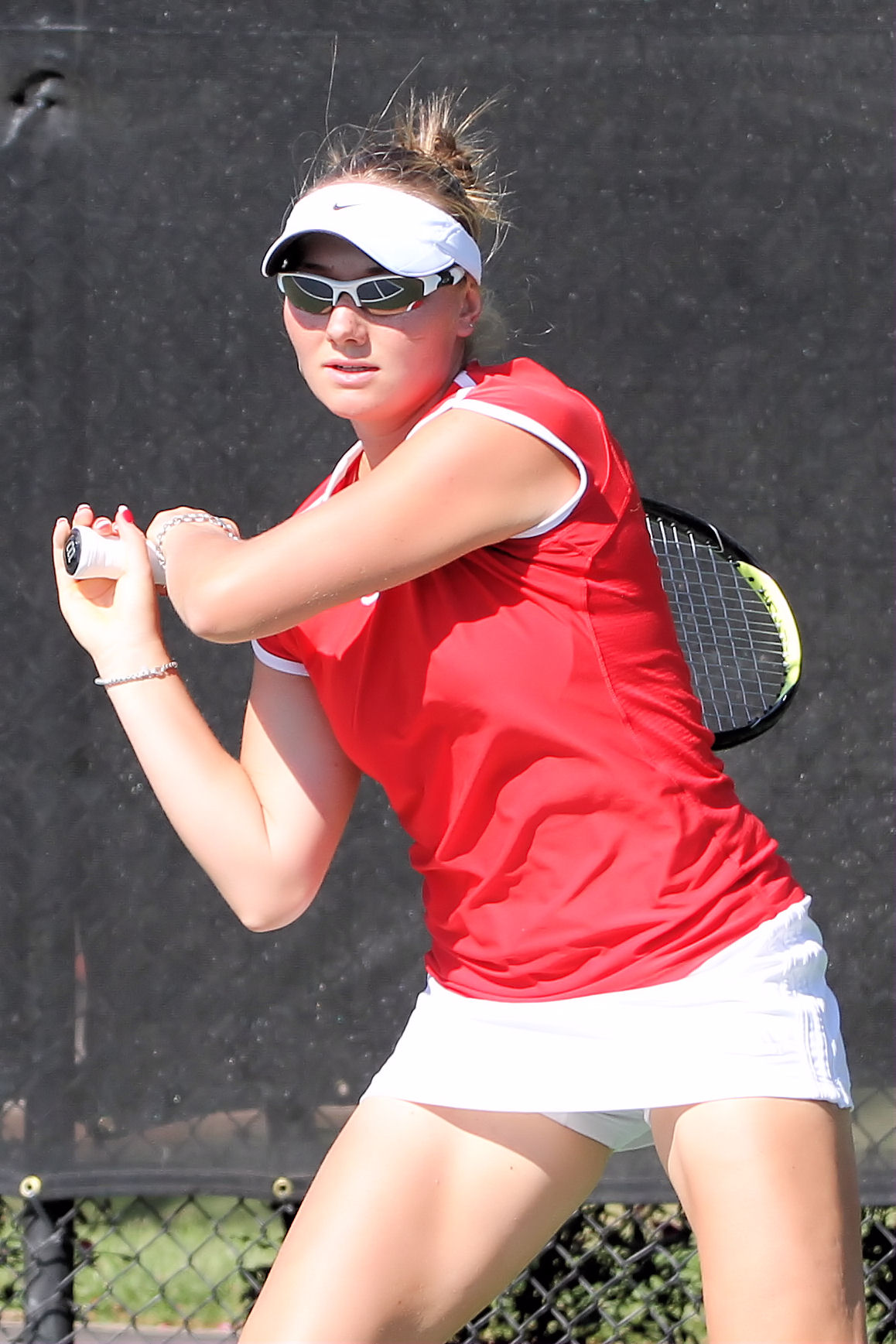
- Native name: Василиса Бардина
- Country (sports): Russia
- Residence: Denver, Colorado
- Born: 30 November 1987 (age 37); Moscow, Russian SFSR, Soviet Union
- Height: 1.69 m (5 ft 7 in)
- Turned pro: 2003
- Retired: 2012
- Plays: Right (two-handed backhand)
- Prize money: $236,661

Singles
- Career record: 149–83
- Career titles: 3 ITF
- Highest ranking: No. 48 (15 January 2007)

Grand Slam singles results
- Australian Open: 1R (2007)
- French Open: 1R (2007)
- Wimbledon: 1R (2007, 2006)
- US Open: 1R (2006)

Doubles
- Career record: 28–29
- Career titles: 3 ITF
- Highest ranking: No. 117 (25 June 2007)

Vasilisa Alekseyevna Bardina (Russian: Василиса Алексеевна Бардина, born 30 November 1987) is a Russian former professional tennis player.

Over her career, Bardina won three singles titles and three doubles titles on the ITF Women's Circuit, but not any WTA Tour titles in singles or doubles. On 15 January 2007, she achieved her highest ranking of world No. 48.

== Biography ==
Vasilisa was born to Alexey Bardin and mother Svetlana. Her goal is to reach the top 10.

== Tennis career ==
Bardina made the final of the Hobart International in 2007, before losing to Anna Chakvetadze.

She was forced off the tour after Wimbledon in 2007 due to injury, she had suffered a stress fracture in her right shin. She tried to come back at the Australian Open in 2008, but it was too soon after her injury and she had only been practicing for two weeks before the event. She lost in straight sets to Sandra Kloesel in qualifying. It was around this time that Bardina split from her coach, her father Alexey Bardin, whom she has described as a "pushy Dad". Bardina made a few tentative appearances at ITF events in North America in 2009 with limited success.

Bardina moved to Denver and worked as a coach at the Evergreen Sports Center, which is where she met former pro Jeff Salzenstein in 2011, who has starting coaching her. Under Salzenstein's guidance, Bardina won the US Open National Playoffs Intermountain Sectional Qualifying Tournament held at the Gates Tennis Center in Denver without dropping a set, which meant she could then play the US Open National Playoffs for a Wildcard into the qualifying draw of the main event.

== WTA Tour finals ==
=== Singles: 1 (runner-up) ===
Winner — Legend
Grand Slam tournaments
Premier M & Premier 5
Premier
International (0–1)

| Result | Date | Tournament | Surface | Opponent | Score |
|---|---|---|---|---|---|
| Loss | Jan 2007 | Hobart International, Australia | Hard | (Russia) Anna Chakvetadze | 3–6, 6–7^{(3–7)} |

== ITF Circuit finals ==
Legend
$75,000 tournaments
$50,000 tournaments
$25,000 tournaments
$10,000 tournaments

=== Singles (3–5) ===
| Result | No. | Date | Tournament | Surface | Opponent | Score |
|---|---|---|---|---|---|---|
| Loss | 1. | 27 June 2004 | Protvino, Russia | Hard | (Russia) Elena Chalova | 2–6, 1–6 |
| Win | 2. | 30 October 2004 | Lagos Open, Nigeria | Hard | (Austria) Jennifer Schmidt | 6–1, 6–3 |
| Loss | 3. | 28 August 2005 | Moscow, Russia | Clay | (Russia) Alisa Kleybanova | 2–6, 2–6 |
| Loss | 4. | 4 September 2005 | Balashikha, Russia | Clay | (Russia) Alla Kudryavtseva | 6–2, 5–7, 4–6 |
| Loss | 5. | 15 January 2006 | Tampa, United States | Hard | (United States) Tiffany Dabek | 7–5, 6–7^{(3–7)}, 3–6 |
| Loss | 6. | 12 February 2006 | Midland, United States | Hard | (Argentina) María Emilia Salerni | 3–6, 6–3, 4–6 |
| Win | 7. | 9 April 2006 | Pelham, United States | Clay | (Romania) Anda Perianu | 6–1, 6–4 |
| Win | 8. | 16 April 2006 | Jackson, United States | Clay | (Canada) Stéphanie Dubois | 4–6, 6–2, 6–0 |

=== Doubles (3–2) ===
| Result | No. | Date | Tournament | Surface | Partner | Opponents | Score |
|---|---|---|---|---|---|---|---|
| Win | 1. | 21 September 2003 | Sidi Fredj, Algeria | Clay | (Czech Republic) Eva Válková | (India) Liza Viplav (Austria) Jennifer Schmidt | 7–5, 6–2 |
| Win | 2. | 27 June 2004 | Protvino, Russia | Hard | (Russia) Julia Efremova | (Israel) Maria Gugel (Russia) Elena Chalova | 6–3, 6–2 |
| Loss | 3. | 4 July 2004 | Krasnoarmeisk, Russia | Hard | (Russia) Julia Efremova | (Russia) Ekaterina Bychkova (Russia) Vasilisa Davydova | 6–7^{(4–7)}, 0–6 |
| Loss | 4. | 10 July 2005 | Darmstadt, Germany | Clay | (Russia) Yaroslava Shvedova | (Germany) Vanessa Henke (Germany) Laura Siegemund | 4–6, 2–6 |
| Win | 5. | 25 March 2006 | Redding, United States | Hard | (United States) Ahsha Rolle | (United Kingdom) Elena Baltacha (Israel) Yevgenia Savransky | 7–5, 3–6, [8–10] |
