= Vera Zvonareva career statistics =

Career finals
Discipline	Type	Won	Lost	Total
Singles	Grand Slam	0	2	2
Singles	WTA Finals	0	1	1
Singles	WTA 1000 (Note: Formerly known as: Tier I (until 2009); Premier Mandatory and Premier 5 (until 2021))	1	6	7
Singles	WTA 500 (Note: Formerly known as: Tier II (until 2009); WTA Premier (until 2021))	1	4	5
Singles	WTA 250 (Note: Formerly known as: Tier III & IV & V (until 2009); WTA International (until 2021))	10	5	15
Singles	Olympics	–	–	–
Singles	Total	12	18	30
Doubles	Grand Slam	3	2	5
Doubles	WTA Finals	1	0	1
Doubles	WTA 1000	4	2	6
Doubles	WTA 500	3	3	5
Doubles	WTA 250	6	2	8
Doubles	Olympics	–	–	–
Doubles	Total	17	9	26
Mixed doubles	Grand Slam	2	0	2
Mixed doubles	Total	2	0	2

This is a list of the main career statistics of Russian professional tennis player Vera Zvonareva. She has won 12 WTA Tour singles titles and reached the finals of the 2008 WTA Tour Championships, 2010 Wimbledon Championships and 2010 US Open. She was also a bronze medalist at the 2008 Beijing Olympics.

== Performance timelines ==
Key
W	F	SF	QF	#R	RR	Q#	P#	DNQ	A	Z#	PO	G	S	B	NMS	NTI	P	NH

(W) winner; (F) finalist; (SF) semifinalist; (QF) quarterfinalist; (#R) rounds 4, 3, 2, 1; (RR) round-robin stage; (Q#) qualification round; (P#) preliminary round; (DNQ) did not qualify; (A) absent; (Z#) Davis/Fed Cup Zonal Group (with number indication) or (PO) play-off; (G) gold, (S) silver or (B) bronze Olympic/Paralympic medal; (NMS) not a Masters tournament; (NTI) not a Tier I tournament; (P) postponed; (NH) not held; (SR) strike rate (events won / competed); (W–L) win–loss record.

Only main-draw results in WTA Tour, Grand Slam tournaments, Billie Jean King Cup (Fed Cup), Hopman Cup, United Cup and Olympic Games are included in win–loss records.

=== Singles ===
Current through the 2026 WTA Tour.

Tournament	2000	2001	2002	2003	2004	2005	2006	2007	2008	2009	2010	2011	2012	2013	2014	2015	2016	2017	2018	2019	2020	2021	2022	2023	2024	2025	2026	SR	W–L	Win %
Grand Slam tournaments
Australian Open	A	A	A	1R	4R	2R	1R	4R	1R	SF	4R	SF	3R	A	1R	2R	A	A	Q1	Q1	A	1R	1R	A	A	A	A	0 / 14	23–14	62%
French Open	A	A	4R	QF	3R	3R	1R	A	4R	A	2R	4R	A	A	A	A	A	A	A	1R	Q3	Q3	A	A	A	A	A	0 / 9	18–9	67%
Wimbledon	A	A	2R	4R	4R	2R	1R	A	2R	3R	F	3R	3R	A	3R	A	A	A	1R	A	NH	2R	A	Q2	A	A	A	0 / 13	24–12	67%
US Open	A	A	3R	3R	4R	A	3R	3R	2R	4R	F	QF	A	A	A	A	A	Q2	2R	A	1R	1R	A	1R	A	A	A	0 / 13	26–13	67%
Win–loss	0–0	0–0	6–3	9–4	11–4	4–3	2–4	5–2	5–4	10–2	16–4	14–4	4–2	0–0	2–2	1–1	0–0	0–0	1–2	0–1	0–1	1–3	0–1	0–1	0–0	0–0	0–0	0 / 49	91–48	65%
Year-end championships
WTA Finals	DNQ				RR	DNQ			F	RR	SF	SF	DNQ								NH	DNQ						0 / 5	8–9	47%
Olympic Games
Olympics	A	not held			A	not held			SF-B	not held			3R	not held			A	not held				A	NH		A	NH		0 / 2	7–2	78%
WTA 1000 tournaments
Qatar Open	NH	not Tier I							F	not held		NTI	2R	A	A	NTI	A	NTI	Q2	NTI	2R	NTI	1R	NTI	A	A	2R	0 / 5	7–5	58%
Dubai Championships	NH	not Tier I								QF	QF	3R	not Tier I			1R	NTI	A	NTI	A	NTI	Q2	NTI	1R	A	A	Q1	0 / 5	6–5	55%
Indian Wells Open	A	A	A	QF	4R	A	A	QF	QF	W	4R	3R	3R	A	1R	1R	A	A	1R	Q2	NH	A	1R	A	A	A	A	1 / 12	22–10	69%
Miami Open	A	Q1	1R	1R	3R	2R	2R	4R	SF	3R	4R	SF	2R	A	A	1R	A	A	A	A	NH	A	3R	Q1	A	A	A	0 / 13	17–13	57%
Madrid Open	not held									A	2R	3R	1R	A	A	A	A	A	A	1R	NH	1R	A	A	A	A	A	0 / 5	3–5	38%
Italian Open	A	A	A	A	SF	SF	3R	A	3R	A	1R	A	A	A	A	A	A	A	A	Q1	1R	3R	A	A	A	A	A	0 / 7	12–7	63%
Canadian Open	A	A	Q2	QF	SF	A	A	A	2R	3R	F	3R	A	A	A	A	A	A	A	A	NH	A	A	A	A	A	A	0 / 6	13–6	68%
Cincinnati Open	not held				not Tier I					3R	3R	SF	A	A	A	A	A	A	A	A	3R	Q1	A	Q1	A	A	A	0 / 4	7–4	64%
China Open	not held				not Tier I					QF	F	3R	A	A	A	A	A	A	A	A	not held			1R	A	A	A	0 / 4	9–4	69%
Pan Pacific Open (Note: Former Tier I / WTA 1000 tournament.)	A	A	A	A	A	A	A	1R	A	2R	QF	F	A	A	not Tier I						not held		not Tier I					0 / 4	6–4	60%
Charleston Open	A	A	A	QF	QF	2R	2R	SF	F	not Tier I											NH	not Tier I						0 / 6	15–6	71%
German Open	A	A	A	QF	2R	2R	2R	A	A	not held												not Tier I						0 / 4	5–4	56%
San Diego Open	not Tier I				SF	2R	3R	A	not held		not Tier I				NH	NTI	not held						not Tier I			NH	NTI	0 / 3	5–3	63%
Kremlin Cup	2R	Q2	1R	QF	QF	2R	QF	QF	F	not Tier I											NH	NTI	not held					0 / 8	14–8	64%
Zurich Open	A	A	Q3	QF	2R	1R	A	2R	NTI	not held																		0 / 4	2–4	33%
Win–loss	1–1	0–0	0–2	17–7	18–9	4–7	9–6	11–6	23–7	14–6	20–9	17–8	1–3	0–0	0–1	0–3	0–0	0–0	0–1	0–1	3–3	2–2	2–3	0–2	0–0	0–0	1–1	1 / 90	143–88	62%
Career statistics
	2000	2001	2002	2003	2004	2005	2006	2007	2008	2009	2010	2011	2012	2013	2014	2015	2016	2017	2018	2019	2020	2021	2022	2023	2024	2025	2026	Career		
Tournaments	1	0	11	23	26	22	24	14	25	17	19	22	10	0	5	8	0	1	9	7	6	11	8	8	0	0	2	Career total: 279		
Titles	0	0	0	1	1	1	2	0	2	2	1	2	0	0	0	0	0	0	0	0	0	0	0	0	0	0	0	Career total: 12		
Finals	0	0	1	1	3	1	3	1	8	2	6	4	0	0	0	0	0	0	0	0	0	0	0	0	0	0	0	Career total: 30		
Hard win–loss	0–0	0–0	3–4	19–14	33–18	11–12	23–14	19–8	48–17	30–12	37–12	44–16	5–5	0–0	1–4	7–8	0–0	3–1	5–6	6–3	4–5	7–5	3–8	4–6	0–0	0–0	1–1	9 / 187	313–179	64%
Clay win–loss	0–0	0–0	15–5	22–6	13–6	7–6	5–5	4–1	15–3	1–1	6–4	8–4	2–2	0–0	0–0	0–0	0–0	0–0	1–2	0–4	0–1	3–3	0–0	0–1	0–0	0–0	0–1	2 / 57	102–55	65%
Grass win–loss	0–0	0–0	1–1	3–1	5–2	2–2	7–2	0–0	1–2	2–1	6–2	4–2	4–2	0–0	2–1	0–0	0–0	0–0	0–1	0–0	0–0	1–2	0–0	0–1	0–0	0–0	0–0	1 / 24	38–22	63%
Carpet win–loss	1–1	0–0	0–1	2–3	3–1	1–1	2–1	7–5	0–0	discontinued																		0 / 11	16–13	55%
Overall win–loss	1–1	0–0	19–11	46–24	54–27	21–21	37–22	30–14	64–22	33–14	49–18	56–22	11–9	0–0	3–5	7–8	0–0	3–1	6–9	6–7	4–6	11–10	3–8	4–8	0–0	0–0	1–2	12 / 279	469–269	64%
Win %	50%	–	63%	66%	67%	50%	63%	68%	74%	70%	73%	72%	55%	–	38%	47%	–	75%	40%	46%	40%	52%	27%	33%	–	–	33%	Career total: 64%		
Year-end ranking	357	365	45	13	11	42	24	23	7	9	2	7	98	N/A	251	182	N/A	204	123	141	163	87	273	256	1168	N/A	282	$17,004,806		

=== Doubles ===
Current through the 2026 WTA Tour.

Tournament	2000	2001	2002	2003	2004	2005	2006	2007	2008	2009	2010	2011	2012	2013	2014	2015	...	2018	2019	2020	2021	2022	2023	2024	2025	2026	SR	W–L	Win %
Grand Slam tournaments
Australian Open	A	A	A	A	1R	SF	QF	3R	A	3R	A	2R	W	A	1R	A		A	1R	A	3R	3R	A	A	A	SF	1 / 12	26–10	72%
French Open	A	A	A	A	3R	3R	QF	A	2R	A	2R	2R	A	A	A	A		A	2R	2R	1R	A	1R	QF	A	QF	0 / 12	16–11	59%
Wimbledon	A	A	A	A	2R	QF	2R	A	2R	1R	F	A	A	A	1R	A		2R	A	NH	3R	A	QF	A	A	3R	0 / 11	18–10	64%
US Open	A	A	A	A	A	A	W	2R	2R	2R	QF	2R	A	A	A	A		3R	A	W	A	A	F	A	A	A	2 / 9	25–5	83%
Win–loss	0–0	0–0	0–0	0–0	3–2	9–3	13–3	3–1	3–3	3–2	9–3	3–2	6–0	0–0	0–2	0–0		3–2	1–2	6–1	4–3	2–1	7–3	3–0	0–0	7–3	3 / 44	85–36	70%
Year-end championships
WTA Finals	DNQ					SF	DNQ													NH	DNQ		W	DNQ			1 / 2	4–2	67%
Olympic Games
Olympics	A	NH			A	NH			QF	NH			A	NH				NH			A	NH		A	NH		0 / 1	2–1	67%
WTA 1000 + former Tier I tournaments
Qatar Open	NH	NTI							SF	NH		NTI	A	A	A	NTI		1R	NTI	A	NTI	1R	NTI	2R	A	2R	0 / 5	5–5	50%
Dubai Open	NH	NTI								A	A	SF	NTI			A		NTI	A	NTI	2R	NTI	QF	1R	A	F	0 / 5	10–4	71%
Indian Wells Open	A	A	A	A	SF	A	A	SF	1R	W	1R	1R	1R	A	1R	QF		A	A	NH	A	2R	A	A	A	A	1 / 10	13–9	59%
Miami Open	A	A	A	A	1R	QF	1R	1R	1R	A	1R	2R	2R	A	A	A		A	A	NH	A	W	2R	A	A	1R	1 / 11	10–10	50%
Madrid Open	NH									A	A	2R	A	A	A	A		A	SF	NH	QF	A	1R	2R	A	SF	0 / 6	10–6	63%
Italian Open	A	A	A	A	A	SF	1R	A	A	A	1R	A	A	A	A	A		A	2R	1R	QF	A	1R	2R	A	2R	0 / 9	7–9	44%
Canadian Open	A	A	A	1R	QF	A	A	A	SF	1R	QF	A	A	A	A	A		A	A	NH	A	A	2R	A	A	A	0 / 6	7–5	58%
Cincinnati Open	NH				NT1					A	A	A	A	A	A	A		2R	A	2R	1R	A	1R	A	A	A	0 / 4	2–4	33%
China Open	NT1									1R	A	A	A	A	A	A		A	A	NH			QF	A	A	1R	0 / 3	2–3	40%
Pan Pacific Open	A	A	A	A	A	A	A	1R	A	A	A	A	A	A	NT1					NH		NT1					0 / 1	0–1	0%
Charleston Open	A	A	A	1R	QF	1R	2R	QF	A	NT1																	0 / 5	5–4	56%
German Open	A	A	A	A	SF	W	1R	A	A	NH											NT1						1 / 3	7–2	78%
So. California Open	NT1				SF	SF	2R	A	NH		NT1						NH										0 / 3	5–2	71%
Kremlin Cup	A	Q1	A	F	W	SF	1R	1R	A	NT1												NH					1 / 5	9–4	69%
Zurich Open	A	A	A	1R	A	A	A	1R	NT1	NH																	0 / 2	0–2	0%
Career statistics
	2000	2001	2002	2003	2004	2005	2006	2007	2008	2009	2010	2011	2012	2013	2014	2015	...	2018	2019	2020	2021	2022	2023	2024	2025	2026	Career		
Tournaments	0	0	3	14	21	16	17	11	11	6	8	9	5	0	5	5		10	10	8	13	7	20	8	0	14	Career total: 221		
Titles	0	0	0	0	1	1	2	0	0	1	0	0	1	0	0	0		2	1	1	0	2	4	0	0	1	Career total: 17		
Finals	0	0	0	1	2	3	2	0	1	1	1	0	1	0	0	0		2	1	1	0	2	5	0	0	3	Career total: 26		
Overall win–loss	0–0	0–0	0–3	9–14	29–18	31–15	24–13	11–9	15–10	8–4	13–7	8–7	8–4	0–0	2–5	5–3		14–8	11–8	12–7	18–13	14–5	35–17	7–7	0–0	23–13	17 / 221	297–190	61%
Year-end ranking	N/A	539	387	73	15	10	18	72	48	58	33	83	33	N/A	345	174		56	71	40	53	31	9	78	N/A	17			

=== Mixed doubles ===
Tournament	2003	2004	2005	2006	2007	...	2010	...	2012	...	2021	...	2023	2024	...	2026	SR	W–L	Win %
Grand Slam tournaments
Australian Open	A	A	QF	QF	1R		A		A		2R		A	A		1R	0 / 5	5–5	50%
French Open	A	A	A	SF	A		A		A		A		1R	1R		1R	0 / 4	3–4	43%
Wimbledon	A	A	A	W	A		2R		2R		2R		A	A		1R	1 / 5	8–3	73%
US Open	1R	W	A	1R	A		A		A		A		1R	A		A	1 / 4	5–3	63%
Win–loss	0–1	5–0	2–1	10–3	0–1		1–1		1–0		2–2		0–2	0–1		0–3	2 / 18	21–15	58%

== Grand Slam tournament finals ==
=== Singles: 2 (2 runner-ups) ===
Result	Year	Tournament	Surface	Opponent	Score
Loss	2010	Wimbledon	Grass	(United States) Serena Williams	3–6, 2–6
Loss	2010	US Open	Hard	(Belgium) Kim Clijsters	2–6, 1–6

=== Doubles: 5 (3 titles, 2 runner-ups) ===
Result	Year	Tournament	Surface	Partner	Opponents	Score
Win	2006	US Open	Hard	(France) Nathalie Dechy	(Russia) Dinara Safina (Slovenia) Katarina Srebotnik	7–6^{(7–5)}, 7–5
Loss	2010	Wimbledon	Grass	(Russia) Elena Vesnina	(United States) Vania King (Kazakhstan) Yaroslava Shvedova	6–7^{(6–8)}, 2–6
Win	2012	Australian Open	Hard	(Russia) Svetlana Kuznetsova	(Italy) Sara Errani (Italy) Roberta Vinci	5–7, 6–4, 6–3
Win	2020	US Open	Hard	(Germany) Laura Siegemund	(United States) Nicole Melichar (China) Xu Yifan	6–4, 6–4
Loss	2023	US Open	Hard	(Germany) Laura Siegemund	(Canada) Gabriela Dabrowski (New Zealand) Erin Routliffe	6–7^{(9–11)}, 3–6

=== Mixed doubles: 2 (2 titles) ===
Result	Year	Championship	Surface	Partner	Opponents	Score
Win	2004	US Open	Hard	(United States) Bob Bryan	(Australia) Alicia Molik (Australia) Todd Woodbridge	6–3, 6–4
Win	2006	Wimbledon	Grass	(Israel) Andy Ram	(United States) Venus Williams (United States) Bob Bryan	6–3, 6–2

== Other significant finals ==
=== Year-end championships ===
==== Singles: 1 (runner-up) ====
Result	Year	Championship	Surface	Opponent	Score
Loss	2008	WTA Championships, Doha	Hard	(United States) Venus Williams	7–6^{(7–5)}, 0–6, 2–6

==== Doubles: 1 (title) ====
Result	Year	Championship	Surface	Partner	Opponents	Score
Win	2023	WTA Finals, Cancún	Hard	(Germany) Laura Siegemund	(United States) Nicole Melichar-Martinez (Australia) Ellen Perez	6–4, 6–4

== WTA Tour finals ==
=== Singles: 30 (12 titles, 18 runner-ups) ===
Legend Grand Slam (0–2) WTA Tour Championships (0–1) Tier I / Premier M & Premier 5 (1–6) Tier II / Premier (1–4) Tier III, IV & V / International (10–5)	Finals by surface Hard (9–14) Grass (1–1) Clay (2–3)

Result	W–L	Date	Tournament	Tier	Surface	Opponent	Score
Loss	0–1	Jul 2002	Palermo Ladies Open, Italy	Tier V	Clay	(Argentina) Mariana Díaz Oliva	7–6^{(8–6)}, 1–6, 3–6
Win	1–1	May 2003	Bol Ladies Open, Croatia	Tier III	Clay	(Spain) Conchita Martínez Granados	6–1, 6–3
Win	2–1	Feb 2004	National Indoors, United States	Tier III	Hard (i)	(United States) Lisa Raymond	4–6, 6–4, 7–5
Loss	2–2	Aug 2004	Cincinnati Open, United States	Tier III	Hard	(United States) Lindsay Davenport	3–6, 2–6
Loss	2–3	Oct 2004	Philadelphia Championships, US	Tier II	Hard	(France) Amélie Mauresmo	6–3, 2–6, 2–6
Win	3–3	Feb 2005	National Indoors, United States (2)	Tier III	Hard (i)	(United States) Meghann Shaughnessy	7–6^{(7–3)}, 6–2
Loss	3–4	Jan 2006	Auckland Open, New Zealand	Tier IV	Hard	(France) Marion Bartoli	2–6, 2–6
Win	4–4	Jun 2006	Birmingham Classic, United Kingdom	Tier III	Grass	(United States) Jamea Jackson	7–6^{(12–10)}, 7–6^{(7–5)}
Win	5–4	Jul 2006	Cincinnati Open, United States	Tier III	Hard	(Slovenia) Katarina Srebotnik	6–2, 6–4
Loss	5–5	Jan 2007	Auckland Open, New Zealand	Tier IV	Hard	(Serbia) Jelena Janković	6–7^{(9–11)}, 7–5, 3–6
Loss	5–6	Jan 2008	Hobart International, Australia	Tier IV	Hard	(Greece) Eleni Daniilidou	w/o
Loss	5–7	Feb 2008	Qatar Open, Qatar	Tier I	Hard	(Russia) Maria Sharapova	1–6, 6–2, 0–6
Loss	5–8	Apr 2008	Charleston Open, United States	Tier I	Clay	(United States) Serena Williams	4–6, 6–3, 3–6
Win	6–8	May 2008	Prague Open, Czech Republic	Tier IV	Clay	(Belarus) Victoria Azarenka	7–6^{(7–2)}, 6–2
Win	7–8	Sep 2008	Guangzhou International, China	Tier III	Hard	(China) Peng Shuai	6–7^{(4–7)}, 6–0, 6–2
Loss	7–9	Oct 2008	Kremlin Cup, Russia	Tier I	Hard (i)	(Serbia) Jelena Janković	2–6, 4–6
Loss	7–10	Oct 2008	Ladies Linz, Austria	Tier II	Hard (i)	(Serbia) Ana Ivanovic	2–6, 1–6
Loss	7–11	Nov 2008	WTA Finals Doha, Qatar	Championships	Hard	(United States) Venus Williams	7–6^{(7–5)}, 0–6, 2–6
Win	8–11	Feb 2009	Pattaya Open, Thailand	International	Hard	(India) Sania Mirza	7–5, 6–1
Win	9–11	Mar 2009	Indian Wells Open, United States	Premier M	Hard	(Serbia) Ana Ivanovic	7–6^{(7–5)}, 6–2
Win	10–11	Feb 2010	Pattaya Open, Thailand (2)	International	Hard	(Thailand) Tamarine Tanasugarn	6–4, 6–4
Loss	10–12	Apr 2010	Charleston Open, United States	Premier	Clay	(Australia) Samantha Stosur	0–6, 3–6
Loss	10–13	Jul 2010	Wimbledon, United Kingdom	Grand Slam	Grass	(United States) Serena Williams	3–6, 2–6
Loss	10–14	Aug 2010	Canadian Open, Canada	Premier 5	Hard	(Denmark) Caroline Wozniacki	3–6, 2–6
Loss	10–15	Sep 2010	US Open, United States	Grand Slam	Hard	(Belgium) Kim Clijsters	2–6, 1–6
Loss	10–16	Oct 2010	China Open, China	Premier M	Hard	(Denmark) Caroline Wozniacki	3–6, 6–3, 3–6
Win	11–16	Feb 2011	Qatar Open, Qatar	Premier	Hard	(Denmark) Caroline Wozniacki	6–4, 6–4
Win	12–16	Jul 2011	Baku Cup, Azerbaijan	International	Hard	(Russia) Ksenia Pervak	6–1, 6–4
Loss	12–17	Aug 2011	San Diego Open, United States	Premier	Hard	(Poland) Agnieszka Radwańska	3–6, 4–6
Loss	12–18	Oct 2011	Pan Pacific Open, Japan	Premier 5	Hard	(Poland) Agnieszka Radwańska	3–6, 2–6

=== Doubles: 26 (17 titles, 9 runner-ups) ===
Legend Grand Slam (3–2) WTA Finals (1–0) Tier I / Premier M / WTA 1000 (4–2) WTA 500 (3–3) Tier III & IV / International / WTA 250 (6–2)	Finals by surface Hard (13–5) Grass (1–2) Clay (2–1) Carpet (1–1)

Result	W–L	Date	Tournament	Tier	Surface	Partner	Opponent	Score
Loss	0–1	Oct 2003	Kremlin Cup, Russia	Tier I	Carpet (i)	(Russia) Anastasia Myskina	(Russia) Nadia Petrova (United States) Meghann Shaughnessy	3–6, 4–6
Loss	0–2	Feb 2004	National Indoors, United States	Tier III	Hard (i)	(Russia) Maria Sharapova	(Sweden) Åsa Svensson (United States) Meilen Tu	4–6, 6–7^{(0–7)}
Win	1–2	Oct 2004	Kremlin Cup, Russia	Tier I	Carpet (i)	(Russia) Anastasia Myskina	(Spain) Virginia Ruano Pascual (Argentina) Paola Suárez	6–3, 4–6, 6–2
Win	2–2	May 2005	German Open, Germany	Tier I	Clay	(Russia) Elena Likhovtseva	(Zimbabwe) Cara Black (South Africa) Liezel Huber	4–6, 6–4, 6–3
Loss	2–3	Jun 2005	Eastbourne International, UK	Tier II	Grass	(Russia) Elena Likhovtseva	(United States) Lisa Raymond (Australia) Rennae Stubbs	3–6, 5–7
Loss	2–4	Jul 2005	Stanford Classic, United States	Tier II	Hard	(Russia) Elena Likhovtseva	(United States) Lisa Raymond (Australia) Rennae Stubbs	3–6, 5–7
Win	3–4	Jan 2006	Auckland Open, New Zealand	Tier IV	Hard	(Russia) Elena Likhovtseva	(France) Émilie Loit (Czech Republic) Barbora Strýcová	6–3, 6–4
Win	4–4	Aug 2006	US Open, United States	Grand Slam	Hard	(France) Nathalie Dechy	(Russia) Dinara Safina (Slovenia) Katarina Srebotnik	7–6^{(7–5)}, 7–5
Loss	4–5	Jul 2008	Stanford Classic, United States	Tier II	Hard	(Russia) Elena Vesnina	(Zimbabwe) Cara Black (United States) Liezel Huber	4–6, 3–6
Win	5–5	Mar 2009	Indian Wells Open, United States	Premier M	Hard	(Belarus) Victoria Azarenka	(Argentina) Gisela Dulko (Israel) Shahar Pe'er	6–4, 3–6, [10–5]
Loss	5–6	Jul 2010	Wimbledon, United Kingdom	Grand Slam	Grass	(Russia) Elena Vesnina	(United States) Vania King (Kazakhstan) Yaroslava Shvedova	6–7^{(6–8)}, 2–6
Win	6–6	Jan 2012	Australian Open, Australia	Grand Slam	Hard	(Russia) Svetlana Kuznetsova	(Italy) Sara Errani (Italy) Roberta Vinci	5–7, 6–4, 6–3
Win	7–6	Feb 2018	St. Petersburg Trophy, Russia	Premier	Hard (i)	(Switzerland) Timea Bacsinszky	(Russia) Alla Kudryavtseva (Slovenia) Katarina Srebotnik	2–6, 6–1, [10–3]
Win	8–6	Jul 2018	Moscow River Cup, Russia	International	Clay	(Russia) Anastasia Potapova	(Russia) Alexandra Panova (Kazakhstan) Galina Voskoboeva	6–0, 6–3
Win	9–6	Feb 2019	Hungarian Open, Hungary	International	Hard (i)	(Russia) Ekaterina Alexandrova	(Hungary) Fanny Stollár (United Kingdom) Heather Watson	6–4, 4–6, [10–7]
Win	10–6	Sep 2020	US Open, United States (2)	Grand Slam	Hard	(Germany) Laura Siegemund	(United States) Nicole Melichar (China) Xu Yifan	6–4, 6–4
Win	11–6	Mar 2022	Lyon Open, France	WTA 250	Hard (i)	(Germany) Laura Siegemund	(United Kingdom) Alicia Barnett (United Kingdom) Olivia Nicholls	7–5, 6–1
Win	12–6	Apr 2022	Miami Open, United States	WTA 1000	Hard	(Germany) Laura Siegemund	(Russia) Veronika Kudermetova (Belgium) Elise Mertens	7–6^{(7–3)}, 7–5
Win	13–6	Aug 2023	Washington Open, United States	WTA 500	Hard	(Germany) Laura Siegemund	(Chile) Alexa Guarachi (Romania) Monica Niculescu	6–4, 6–4
Loss	13–7	Sep 2023	US Open, United States	Grand Slam	Hard	(Germany) Laura Siegemund	(Canada) Gabriela Dabrowski (New Zealand) Erin Routliffe	6–7^{(9–11)}, 3–6
Win	14–7	Sep 2023	Ningbo International, China	WTA 250	Hard	(Germany) Laura Siegemund	(China) Guo Hanyu (China) Jiang Xinyu	4–6, 6–3, [10–5]
Win	15–7	Oct 2023	Jiangxi International, China	WTA 250	Hard	(Germany) Laura Siegemund	(Japan) Eri Hozumi (Japan) Makoto Ninomiya	6–4, 6–2
Win	16–7	Nov 2023	WTA Finals, Mexico	Finals	Hard	(Germany) Laura Siegemund	(United States) Nicole Melichar-Martinez (Australia) Ellen Perez	6–4, 6–4
Loss	16–8	Feb 2026	Dubai Open, UAE	WTA 1000	Hard	(Germany) Laura Siegemund	(Canada) Gabriela Dabrowski (Brazil) Luisa Stefani	1–6, 3–6
Loss	16–9	May 2026	Rabat Grand Prix, Morocco	WTA 250	Clay	(Indonesia) Aldila Sutjiadi	(Hong Kong) Eudice Chong (Belgium) Magali Kempen	3–6, 6–2, [6–10]
Win	17–9	Jun 2026	Bad Homburg Open, Germany	WTA 500	Grass	(Indonesia) Aldila Sutjiadi	(Australia) Ellen Perez (Netherlands) Demi Schuurs	6–1, 4–6, [10–5]

== WTA 125 finals ==
=== Singles: 1 (runner-up) ===
Result	Date	Tournament	Surface	Opponents	Score
Loss	Sep 2017	Dalian Open, China	Hard	(Ukraine) Kateryna Kozlova	4–6, 2–6

=== Doubles: 7 (3 titles, 4 runner-ups) ===
Result	W–L	Date	Tournament	Surface	Partner	Opponents	Score
Loss	0–1	Nov 2018	Open de Limoges, France	Hard (i)	(Switzerland) Timea Bacsinszky	(Russia) Veronika Kudermetova (Kazakhstan) Galina Voskoboeva	5–7, 4–6
Loss	0–2	Dec 2021	Open Angers, France	Hard (i)	(Romania) Monica Niculescu	(Slovakia) Tereza Mihalíková (Belgium) Greet Minnen	6–4, 1–6, [8–10]
Win	1–2	Dec 2021	Open de Limoges, France	Hard (i)	(Romania) Monica Niculescu	(France) Estelle Cascino (France) Jessika Ponchet	6–4, 6–4
Win	2–2	May 2023	Clarins Open Paris, France	Clay	(Kazakhstan) Anna Danilina	(Ukraine) Nadiia Kichenok (United States) Alycia Parks	5–7, 7–6^{(7–2)}, [14–12]
Loss	2–3	Mar 2024	Antalya Challenger, Turkey	Clay	(Hungary) Tímea Babos	(Italy) Angelica Moratelli (Italy) Camilla Rosatello	3–6, 6–3, [13–15]
Loss	2–4	Jan 2026	Canberra International, Australia	Hard	(Japan) Ena Shibahara	Maria Kozyreva; Iryna Shymanovich	7–6^{(11–9)}, 5–7, [8–10]
Win	3–4	Jul 2026	ENKA Open, Turkey	Hard	(Japan) Ena Shibahara	Tatiana Prozorova; Alexandra Shubladze	6–3, 3–6, [10–8]

== ITF Circuit finals ==
=== Singles: 5 (3 titles, 2 runner-ups) ===
Legend $100,000 tournaments (0–1) $50,000 tournaments (1–0) $25,000 tournaments (0–1) $10/15,000 tournaments (2–0)	Finals by surface Hard (0–2) Clay (2–0) Carpet (1–0)

Result	W–L	Date	Tournament	Tier	Surface	Opponent	Score
Win	1–0	Sep 2000	ITF Moscow, Russia	10,000	Carpet (i)	(Russia) Maria Goloviznina	6–4, 6–2
Win	2–0	Apr 2002	ITF Naples, United States	50,000	Clay	(Canada) Maureen Drake	6–1, 6–3
Win	3–0	Jul 2017	ITF Sharm El Sheikh, Egypt	15,000	Clay	(Slovakia) Tereza Mihalíková	1–6, 7–6^{(4)}, 7–5
Loss	3–1	Oct 2020	ITF Istanbul, Turkey	25,000	Hard (i)	(Estonia) Kaia Kanepi	3–6, 3–6
Loss	3–2	Dec 2025	Dubai Tennis Challenge, UAE	100,000	Hard	(Croatia) Petra Marčinko	3–6, 3–6

=== Doubles: 5 (2 titles, 3 runner-ups) ===
Legend $100,000 tournaments (1–1) $50,000 tournaments (0–1) $10/15,000 tournaments (1–1)	Finals by surface Hard (1–1) Clay (1–2)

Result	W–L	Date	Tournament	Tier	Surface	Partner	Opponents	Score
Loss	0–1	Apr 2001	ITF Cagliari, Italy	10,000	Clay	(Sweden) Aleksandra Srndovic	(Italy) Giulia Meruzzi (Romania) Andreea Ehritt-Vanc	1–6, 3–6
Loss	0–2	Apr 2002	ITF Naples, United States	50,000	Clay	(Argentina) Gisela Dulko	(Japan) Rika Hiraki (Japan) Nana Smith	5–7, 6–4, 5–7
Win	1–2	Apr 2019	ITF Antalya, Turkey	15,000	Clay	(Switzerland) Marie Mettraux	(Czech Republic) Karolína Kubáňová (Czech Republic) Nikola Tomanová	6–3, 0–6, [12–10]
Win	2–2	Dec 2023	Dubai Tennis Challenge, UAE	100,000	Hard	(Hungary) Tímea Babos	(United Kingdom) Olivia Nicholls (United Kingdom) Heather Watson	6–1, 2–6, [10–7]
Loss	2–3	Dec 2025	Dubai Tennis Challenge, UAE	100,000	Hard	Rada Zolotareva	(China) Gao Xinyu (Thailand) Mananchaya Sawangkaew	6–4, 5–7, [7–10]

=== Team competition (2 titles) ===
Results	Date	Tournament	Surface	Partners	Opponents	Score
Win	Nov 2004	Fed Cup, Russia	Carpet (i)	(Russia) Anastasia Myskina (Russia) Svetlana Kuznetsova	(France) Nathalie Dechy (France) Tatiana Golovin (France) Émilie Loit (France) Marion Bartoli	3–2
Win	Sep 2008	Fed Cup, Spain (2)	Clay	(Russia) Svetlana Kuznetsova (Russia) Ekaterina Makarova (Russia) Elena Vesnina	(Spain) Anabel Medina Garrigues (Spain) Carla Suárez Navarro (Spain) Nuria Llagostera Vives	4–0

== Grand Slam tournament seedings ==
- The tournaments won by Zvonareva are in **boldface**, and advanced into finals by Zvonareva are in italics.

Year	Australian Open	French Open	Wimbledon	US Open
2002	did not play	qualifier	not seeded	not seeded
2003	not seeded	22nd	16th	13th
2004	11th	10th	12th	10th
2005	9th	9th	11th	did not play
2006	30th	not seeded	not seeded	33rd
2007	22nd	did not play	did not play	27th
2008	23rd	11th	13th	8th
2009	7th	did not play	7th	7th
2010	9th	12th	16th (1)	7th (2)
2011	2nd	3rd	2nd	2nd
2012	7th	did not play	12th	did not play
2013	did not play	did not play	did not play	did not play
2014	not seeded	did not play	wild card	did not play
2015	not seeded	did not play	did not play	did not play
2016	did not play	did not play	did not play	did not play
2017	did not play	did not play	did not play	did not qualify
2018	did not qualify	did not play	not seeded	not seeded
2019	did not qualify	not seeded	did not play	did not play
2020	did not play	did not qualify	cancelled	not seeded
2021	protected ranking	did not qualify	not seeded	not seeded

== WTA Tour career earnings ==
Correct as of the end of the 2021

Year	Grand Slam titles (Note: Includes singles, doubles and mixed doubles titles.)	WTA titles	Total titles	Earnings ($)	Money list rank
2002	0	0	0	157,740	71
2003	0	1	1	502,712	19
2004	1	2	3	988,017	12
2005	0	2	2	491,914	26
2006	2	3	5	683,190	18
2007	0	0	0	383,139	42
2008	0	2	2	1,777,675	8
2009	0	3	3	1,642,145	9
2010	0	1	1	3,444,641	4
2011	0	2	2	2,673,018	7
2012	1	0	1	458,524	42
2013	0	0	0	N/A	N/A
2014	0	0	0	174,448	137
2015	0	0	0	126,920	167
2016	0	0	0	N/A	N/A
2017	0	0	0	42,942	293
2018	0	2	2	313,419	120
2019	0	1	1	340,170	120
2020	1	0	1	389,944	54
2021	0	0	0	479,977	87
Career	5	19	24	15,101,642	28

== Wins against top 10 players ==
Season	2003	2004	2005	2006	2007	2008	2009	2010	2011	...	2018	...	2021	...	Total
Wins	2	3	0	1	1	7	2	10	5		1		1		33

No.	Player	Rk	Event	Surface	Rd	Score	Rk	Years	Ref
1.	(Russia) Anastasia Myskina	10	German Open, Germany	Clay	2R	6–1, 6–2	25	2003	
2.	(United States) Venus Williams	3	French Open, France	Clay	4R	2–6, 6–2, 6–4	21	2003	
3.	(Russia) Svetlana Kuznetsova	9	Carlsbad Open, US	Hard	3R	6–2, 6–3	15	2004	
4.	(Russia) Maria Sharapova	8	Canadian Open, Canada	Hard	3R	4–6, 6–4, 6–4	14	2004	
5.	(United States) Jennifer Capriati	9	Philadelphia Championships, US	Hard (i)	QF	6–0, 6–1	11	2004	
6.	(Russia) Svetlana Kuznetsova	4	Kremlin Cup, Russia	Hard (i)	2R	6–1, 6–3	29	2006	
7.	(Russia) Maria Sharapova	1	Indian Wells Open, US	Hard	4R	4–6, 7–5, 6–1	20	2007	
8.	(Serbia) Jelena Janković	5	Charleston Open, US	Clay	QF	6–2, 3–6, 6–2	17	2008	
9.	(Russia) Elena Dementieva	8	Charleston Open, US	Clay	SF	6–3, 6–7^{(2)}, 6–3	17	2008	
10.	(Russia) Dinara Safina	3	Kremlin Cup, Russia	Hard (i)	SF	6–2, 7–6^{(5)}	9	2008	
11.	(Russia) Svetlana Kuznetsova	7	WTA Championships, Doha	Hard	RR	6–2, 6–3	9	2008	
12.	(Serbia) Ana Ivanovic	4	WTA Championships, Doha	Hard	RR	6–3, 6–7^{(5)}, 6–4	9	2008	
13.	(Serbia) Jelena Janković	1	WTA Championships, Doha	Hard	RR	2–6, 6–3, 6–4	9	2008	
14.	(Russia) Elena Dementieva	5	WTA Championships, Doha	Hard	SF	7–6^{(7)}, 3–6, 6–3	9	2008	
15.	(Serbia) Ana Ivanovic	7	Indian Wells Open, US	Hard	F	7–6^{(5)}, 6–2	6	2009	
16.	(Italy) Flavia Pennetta	10	China Open, China	Hard	3R	6–3, 5–7, 7–5	7	2009	
17.	(Serbia) Jelena Janković	8	Dubai Championships, UAE	Hard	3R	6–3, 6–2	14	2010	
18.	(Denmark) Caroline Wozniacki	2	Charleston Open, US	Clay	SF	5–2 ret.	22	2010	
19.	(Serbia) Jelena Janković	3	Wimbledon, UK	Grass	4R	6–1, 3–0 ret.	21	2010	
20.	(Belgium) Kim Clijsters	8	Wimbledon, UK	Grass	QF	3–6, 6–4, 6–2	21	2010	
21.	(Belgium) Kim Clijsters	4	Canadian Open, Canada	Hard	QF	2–6, 6–3, 6–2	11	2010	
22.	(Denmark) Caroline Wozniacki	2	US Open, US	Hard	SF	6–4, 6–3	8	2010	
23.	(Italy) Francesca Schiavone	6	China Open, China	Hard	QF	6–0, 6–2	4	2010	
24.	(Serbia) Jelena Janković	8	WTA Championships, Doha	Hard	RR	6–3, 6–0	2	2010	
25.	(Belarus) Victoria Azarenka	10	WTA Championships, Doha	Hard	RR	7–6^{(4)}, 6–4	2	2010	
26.	(Belgium) Kim Clijsters	4	WTA Championships, Doha	Hard	RR	6–4, 7–5	2	2010	
27.	(Serbia) Jelena Janković	6	Qatar Ladies Open	Hard	SF	6–1, 2–6, 6–4	3	2011	
28.	(Denmark) Caroline Wozniacki	1	Qatar Ladies Open	Hard	F	6–4, 6–4	3	2011	
29.	(France) Marion Bartoli	10	Miami Open, US	Hard	4R	2–6, 6–3, 6–2	3	2011	
30.	(Czech Republic) Petra Kvitová	6	Pan Pacific Open, Japan	Hard	SF	7–6^{(2)}, 6–0	4	2011	
31.	(Denmark) Caroline Wozniacki	1	WTA Championships, Turkey	Hard (i)	RR	6–2, 4–6, 6–3	6	2011	
32.	(Czech Republic) Karolína Plíšková	5	Kremlin Cup, Russia	Hard (i)	2R	6–1, 6–2	161	2018	
33.	(Czech Republic) Petra Kvitová	10	Italian Open, Italy	Clay	2R	6–4, 3–6, 6–4	113	2021	

- Key: (Rk) first use, opponent rank; (Rd) round; (Rk) 2nd use, player rank; (Ref) reference; (F) final; (SF) semifinal; (QF) quarterfinal; (#R) rounds 4, 3, 2, 1; (RR) round-robin stage; (Q#) qualifying rounds or stages (3), 2, 1.

== Best Grand Slam results details ==
=== Singles ===
Australian Open
2009 Australian Open (7th seed)
Round	Opponent	Rank	Score	VZR
1R	(Slovakia) Magdaléna Rybáriková	No. 50	7–6^{(7–2)}, 6–0	No. 7
2R	(Romania) Edina Gallovits	No. 76	6–0, 6–0	No. 7
3R	(Italy) Sara Errani	No. 39	6–4, 6–1	No. 7
4R	(Russia) Nadia Petrova (10)	No. 11	7–5, 6–4	No. 7
QF	(France) Marion Bartoli (16)	No. 17	6–3, 6–0	No. 7
SF	(Russia) Dinara Safina (3)	No. 3	3–6, 6–7^{(4–7)}	No. 7
2011 Australian Open (2nd seed)
Round	Opponent	Rank	Score	VZR
1R	(Austria) Sybille Bammer	No. 70	6–2, 6–1	No. 2
2R	(Serbia) Bojana Jovanovski	No. 58	2–6, 6–3, 6–1	No. 2
3R	(Czech Republic) Lucie Šafářová (31)	No. 35	6–3, 7–6^{(11–9)}	No. 2
4R	(Czech Republic) Iveta Benešová	No. 60	6–4, 6–1	No. 2
QF	(Czech Republic) Petra Kvitová (25)	No. 28	6–2, 6–4	No. 2
SF	(Belgium) Kim Clijsters (3)	No. 3	3–6, 3–6	No. 2

Wimbledon Championships
2010 Wimbledon (21st seed)
Round	Opponent	Rank	Score	VZR
1R	(Spain) Nuria Llagostera Vives (Q)	No. 177	6–4, 6–1	No. 21
2R	(Czech Republic) Andrea Hlaváčková (Q)	No. 147	6–1, 6–4	No. 21
3R	(Belgium) Yanina Wickmayer (15)	No. 18	6–4, 6–2	No. 21
4R	(Serbia) Jelena Janković (4)	No. 3	6–1, 3–0 ret.	No. 21
QF	(Belgium) Kim Clijsters (8)	No. 8	3–6, 6–4, 6–2	No. 21
SF	(Bulgaria) Tsvetana Pironkova	No. 82	3–6, 6–3, 6–2	No. 21
F	(United States) Serena Williams (1)	No. 1	3–6, 2–6	No. 21

French Open
2003 French Open (22nd seed)
Round	Opponent	Rank	Score	VZR
1R	(Germany) Martina Müller	No. 138	6–1, 6–3	No. 21
2R	(Czech Republic) Denisa Chládková	No. 38	6–2, 6–3	No. 21
3R	(Spain) María Sánchez Lorenzo	No. 60	6–3, 6–4	No. 21
4R	(United States) Venus Williams (3)	No. 3	2–6, 6–2, 6–4	No. 21
QF	(Russia) Nadia Petrova	No. 76	1–6, 6–4, 3–6	No. 21

US Open
2010 US Open (7th seed)
Round	Opponent	Rank	Score	VZR
1R	(Slovakia) Zuzana Kučová (Q)	No. 119	6–2, 6–1	No. 8
2R	(Germany) Sabine Lisicki	No. 94	6–1, 7–6^{(7–5)}	No. 8
3R	(Romania) Alexandra Dulgheru (25)	No. 27	6–2, 7–6^{(7–2)}	No. 8
4R	(Germany) Andrea Petkovic	No. 38	6–1, 6–2	No. 8
QF	(Estonia) Kaia Kanepi (31)	No. 32	6–3, 7–5	No. 8
SF	(Denmark) Caroline Wozniacki (1)	No. 2	6–4, 6–3	No. 8
F	(Belgium) Kim Clijsters (2)	No. 3	2–6, 1–6	No. 8
