= 2016 Bol Open – Doubles =

Doubles
- 2016 Bol Open

Final
- Champion: (Switzerland) Xenia Knoll (Croatia) Petra Martić
- Runner-up: (Romania) Raluca Olaru (Turkey) İpek Soylu
- Score: 6–3, 6–2

Events
Singles	Doubles
← 2003 ·	Bol Open	· 2017 →

This was the first edition of the tournament as a 125K event. Petra Mandula and Patricia Wartusch were the champions when it was last held as a Tier III event in 2003, but both have since retired from the sport.

Xenia Knoll and Petra Martić won the title, defeating Raluca Olaru and İpek Soylu in the final, 6–3, 6–2.

== Seeds ==
All seeds received a bye into the quarterfinals.

1. (Romania) Raluca Olaru / (Turkey) İpek Soylu (final)
2. (Chinese Taipei) Chan Chin-wei / (Czech Republic) Renata Voráčová (quarterfinals)
3. (Israel) Julia Glushko / (Poland) Paula Kania (semifinals)
4. (Switzerland) Xenia Knoll / (Croatia) Petra Martić (champions)

== Draw ==
=== Key ===
- Q = Qualifier
- WC = Wild card
- LL = Lucky loser
- Alt = Alternate
- SE = Special exempt
- PR = Protected ranking
- ITF = ITF entry
- JE = Junior exempt
- w/o = Walkover
- r = Retired
- d = Defaulted
- SR = Special ranking

First round
WC	(Croatia) T Lukas (India) P Thombare	6	6
(Croatia) T Mrdeža (Bulgaria) I Shinikova	2	3
(Czech Republic) L Kunčíková (Czech Republic) K Stuchlá	6	0	[5]
(Belgium) Y Bonaventure (Sweden) R Peterson	3	6	[10]
(Serbia) I Jorović (Croatia) A Vrljić	2	6^{3}
(Bulgaria) E Kostova (United States) S Vickery	6	7^{7}
WC	(Croatia) A Mijačika (France) M Partaud	4	3
(Romania) A Mitu (Romania) PM Țig	6	6

Quarterfinals
1	(Romania) R Olaru (Turkey) İ Soylu	6	7
WC	(Croatia) T Lukas (India) P Thombare	2	5
3	(Israel) J Glushko (Poland) P Kania	w/o
(Belgium) Y Bonaventure (Sweden) R Peterson
(Bulgaria) E Kostova (United States) S Vickery
4	(Switzerland) X Knoll (Croatia) P Martić	w/o
(Romania) A Mitu (Romania) PM Țig	6	6
2	(Chinese Taipei) C-w Chan (Czech Republic) R Voráčová	3	3

Semifinals
1	(Romania) R Olaru (Turkey) İ Soylu	6	6
3	(Israel) J Glushko (Poland) P Kania	3	3
4	(Switzerland) X Knoll (Croatia) P Martić	6	6
(Romania) A Mitu (Romania) PM Țig	1	2

Final
1	(Romania) R Olaru (Turkey) İ Soylu	3	2
4	(Switzerland) X Knoll (Croatia) P Martić	6	6
