= 2003 Croatian Bol Ladies Open =

- Date: 28 April – 4 May
- Edition: 10th
- Category: Tier III
- Draw: 30S / 16D
- Prize money: $170,000
- Surface: Clay / outdoor
- Location: Bol, Croatia

Champions

Singles
- (Russia) Vera Zvonareva

Doubles
- (Hungary) Petra Mandula / (Austria) Patricia Wartusch
← 2002 ·	Croatian Bol Ladies Open	· 2016 →

The 2003 Croatian Bol Ladies Open was a women's tennis tournament played on outdoor clay courts in Bol, Croatia and was part of the Tier III category of the 2003 WTA Tour. It was the tenth edition of the tournament and was held from 28 April until 4 May 2003. Third-seeded Vera Zvonareva won the singles title and earned $27,000 first-prize money.

== Finals ==
=== Singles ===
(Russia) Vera Zvonareva defeated (Spain) Conchita Martínez Granados 6–1, 6–3

- It was Zvonareva's first singles title of her career.

=== Doubles ===
(Hungary) Petra Mandula / (Austria) Patricia Wartusch defeated (Switzerland) Emmanuelle Gagliardi / (Switzerland) Patty Schnyder 6–3, 6–2
