= 2008 Kremlin Cup – Women's doubles =

Women's doubles
- 2008 Kremlin Cup

Final
- Champions: (Russia) Nadia Petrova (Slovenia) Katarina Srebotnik
- Runners-up: (Zimbabwe) Cara Black (United States) Liezel Huber
- Score: 6–4, 6–4

Details
- Seeds: 4

Events
Singles	men	women
Doubles	men	women
← 2007 ·	Kremlin Cup	· 2009 →

Cara Black and Liezel Huber were the defending champions, but Nadia Petrova and Katarina Srebotnik defeated them 6–4, 6–4, in the final.

== Seeds ==
1. (Zimbabwe) Cara Black / (United States) Liezel Huber (final)
2. (Czech Republic) Květa Peschke / (Australia) Rennae Stubbs (quarterfinals)
3. (Ukraine) Alyona Bondarenko / (Ukraine) Kateryna Bondarenko (first round)
4. (Russia) Nadia Petrova / (Slovenia) Katarina Srebotnik (champions)

== Draw ==
=== Key ===
- Q = Qualifier
- WC = Wild card
- LL = Lucky loser
- Alt = Alternate
- SE = Special exempt
- PR = Protected ranking
- ITF = ITF entry
- JE = Junior exempt
- w/o = Walkover
- r = Retired
- d = Defaulted
- SR = Special ranking

=== Draw ===
First round
1	(Zimbabwe) C Black (United States) L Huber	6	6
(Uzbekistan) A Amanmuradova (Belarus) D Kustova	2	4
WC	(Serbia) A Ivanovic (Italy) F Schiavone	7	6^{7}	[10]
(Spain) N Llagostera Vives (Russia) E Vesnina	6^{1}	7	[5]
3	(Ukraine) A Bondarenko (Ukraine) K Bondarenko	4	4
(Russia) M Kirilenko (Italy) F Pennetta	6	6
(Russia) E Makarova (Russia) G Voskoboeva	6	2	[10]
(Ukraine) M Koryttseva (Belarus) T Perebiynis	3	6	[7]
(Czech Republic) E Hrdinová (Czech Republic) V Uhlířová	1	5
(Russia) V Dushevina (Russia) A Kudryavtseva	6	7
(Belarus) E Dzehalevich (Ukraine) O Savchuk	4	1
4	(Russia) N Petrova (Slovenia) K Srebotnik	6	6
(Romania) M Niculescu (Kazakhstan) Y Shvedova	6^{3}	6	[10]
WC	(Russia) A Chakvetadze (Slovakia) D Cibulková	7	1	[4]
(Poland) K Jans (Poland) A Rosolska	3	3
2	(Czech Republic) K Peschke (Australia) R Stubbs	6	6

Quarterfinals
1	(Zimbabwe) C Black (United States) L Huber	6	4	[10]
WC	(Serbia) A Ivanovic (Italy) F Schiavone	2	6	[7]
(Russia) M Kirilenko (Italy) F Pennetta	6^{1}	6	[10]
(Russia) E Makarova (Russia) G Voskoboeva	7	1	[5]
(Russia) V Dushevina (Russia) A Kudryavtseva	0	5
4	(Russia) N Petrova (Slovenia) K Srebotnik	6	7
(Romania) M Niculescu (Kazakhstan) Y Shvedova	4	6	[10]
2	(Czech Republic) K Peschke (Australia) R Stubbs	6	0	[7]

Semifinals
1	(Zimbabwe) C Black (United States) L Huber	6	6
(Russia) M Kirilenko (Italy) F Pennetta	1	0
4	(Russia) N Petrova (Slovenia) K Srebotnik	6	6
(Romania) M Niculescu (Kazakhstan) Y Shvedova	3	2

Final
1	(Zimbabwe) C Black (United States) L Huber	4	4
4	(Russia) N Petrova (Slovenia) K Srebotnik	6	6
