= 2008 Kremlin Cup – Men's doubles =

Men's doubles
- 2008 Kremlin Cup

Final
- Champions: (Ukraine) Sergiy Stakhovsky (Italy) Potito Starace
- Runners-up: (Australia) Stephen Huss (United Kingdom) Ross Hutchins
- Score: 7–6^{(7–4)}, 2–6, [10–6]

Details
- Draw: 16
- Seeds: 4

Events
Singles	men	women
Doubles	men	women
← 2007 ·	Kremlin Cup	· 2009 →

In the 2008 Kremlin Cup - Men's doubles, Marat Safin and Dmitry Tursunov were the defending champions. They were both present but did not compete together. Safin partnered with Teymuraz Gabashvili, but lost in the first round to Stephen Huss and Ross Hutchins. Tursunov partnered with Igor Kunitsyn, but they were forced to withdraw due to a shoulder injury for Tursunov before their quarterfinals match against Sergiy Stakhovsky and Potito Starace.

Stakhovsky and Starace won in the final 7–6^{(7–4)}, 2–6, [10–6], against Stephen Huss and Ross Hutchins.

== Seeds ==
1. (Australia) Jordan Kerr / (United Kingdom) Jamie Murray (first round)
2. (Czech Republic) František Čermák / (Netherlands) Rogier Wassen (quarterfinals)
3. (France) Michaël Llodra / (France) Fabrice Santoro (semifinals)
4. (Russia) Igor Kunitsyn / (Russia) Dmitry Tursunov (quarterfinals, withdrew due to a shoulder injury for Tursunov)

== Draw ==
Key

- Q = Qualifier
- WC = Wild card
- LL = Lucky loser
- Alt = Alternate
- ITF = ITF entry
- PR = Protected ranking
- SR = Special ranking
- SE = Special exempt
- JE = Junior exempt
- JR = Junior Accelerator Programme entrant
- CO = College Accelerator Programme entrant
- NG = Next Gen Accelerator Program entrant
- w/o = Walkover
- r = Retired
- d = Defaulted

=== Draw ===
First round
1	(Australia) J Kerr (United Kingdom) J Murray	7^{7}	5	[8]
(Russia) M Youzhny (Germany) M Zverev	6^{3}	7	[10]
(Australia) S Huss (United Kingdom) R Hutchins	6	6
(Russia) T Gabashvili (Russia) M Safin	4	2
3	(France) M Llodra (France) F Santoro	6	6
(France) J Chardy (France) F Serra	3	4
(Serbia) J Tipsarević (Serbia) V Troicki	6^{5}	6	[10]
(Slovakia) M Mertiňák (Croatia) L Zovko	7^{7}	3	[8]
WC	(Russia) S Demekhine (Russia) K Kravchuk	6^{4}	6	[7]
(Ukraine) S Stakhovsky (Italy) P Starace	7^{7}	1	[10]
WC	(Russia) E Donskoy (Austria) S Vovk	3	3
4	(Russia) I Kunitsyn (Russia) D Tursunov	6	6
(Czech Republic) D Škoch (Slovakia) I Zelenay	6	6
(Germany) F Moser (Israel) D Sela	3	4
(Germany) D Gremelmayr (Chinese Taipei) Y-h Lu	1	4
2	(Czech Republic) F Čermák (Netherlands) R Wassen	6	6

Quarterfinals
(Russia) M Youzhny (Germany) M Zverev	6^{5}	6^{4}
(Australia) S Huss (United Kingdom) R Hutchins	7^{7}	7^{7}
3	(France) M Llodra (France) F Santoro	6	6
(Serbia) J Tipsarević (Serbia) V Troicki	0	1
(Ukraine) S Stakhovsky (Italy) P Starace	w/o
4	(Russia) I Kunitsyn (Russia) D Tursunov
(Czech Republic) D Škoch (Slovakia) I Zelenay	6	6
2	(Czech Republic) F Čermák (Netherlands) R Wassen	2	4

Semifinals
(Australia) S Huss (United Kingdom) R Hutchins	6^{4}	6	[10]
3	(France) M Llodra (France) F Santoro	7^{7}	2	[7]
(Ukraine) S Stakhovsky (Italy) P Starace	6	6^{5}	[16]
(Czech Republic) D Škoch (Slovakia) I Zelenay	3	7^{7}	[14]

Final
(Australia) S Huss (United Kingdom) R Hutchins	6^{4}	6	[6]
(Ukraine) S Stakhovsky (Italy) P Starace	7^{7}	2	[10]
