= 2016 Bol Open – Singles =

Singles
- 2016 Bol Open

Final
- Champion: (Luxembourg) Mandy Minella
- Runner-up: (Slovenia) Polona Hercog
- Score: 6–2, 6–3

Events
Singles	Doubles
← 2003 ·	Bol Open	· 2017 →

This was the first edition of the tournament as a 125K event. Vera Zvonareva was the champion when it was last held as a Tier III event in 2003, but chose not to participate.

Mandy Minella won the title, defeating Polona Hercog in the final, 6–2, 6–3.

== Seeds ==
1. (Slovakia) Anna Karolína Schmiedlová (first round)
2. (United States) Varvara Lepchenko (second round)
3. (China) Zhang Shuai (first round)
4. (Japan) Nao Hibino (semifinals)
5. (Croatia) Ana Konjuh (semifinals, retired)
6. (Japan) Kurumi Nara (first round, retired)
7. (Slovenia) Polona Hercog (final)
8. (Romania) Patricia Maria Țig (first round)

== Draw ==
=== Key ===
- Q = Qualifier
- WC = Wild card
- LL = Lucky loser
- Alt = Alternate
- SE = Special exempt
- PR = Protected ranking
- ITF = ITF entry
- JE = Junior exempt
- w/o = Walkover
- r = Retired
- d = Defaulted
- SR = Special ranking

=== Finals ===
Semifinals
7	(Slovenia) Polona Hercog	6	6
4	(Japan) Nao Hibino	0	2
5	(Croatia) Ana Konjuh	3	1^{r}
(Luxembourg) Mandy Minella	6	2

Final
7	(Slovenia) Polona Hercog	2	3
(Luxembourg) Mandy Minella	6	6

=== Top half ===
First round
1/WC	(Slovakia) AK Schmiedlová	4	0
(Slovakia) K Kučová	6	6
(United States) A Tatishvili	6	6^{4}	7
(Poland) P Kania	4	7^{7}	5
Q	(Bulgaria) E Kostova	6	7^{7}
Q	(Russia) E Alexandrova	1	6^{4}
(Croatia) P Martić	2	6	1
7	(Slovenia) P Hercog	6	4	6
4	(Japan) N Hibino	6	6
Q	(France) M Partaud	2	1
Q	(Bulgaria) I Shinikova	5	2
(Serbia) I Jorović	7	6
(Switzerland) S Vögele	6	6
(Romania) A Mitu	3	2
(United States) J Brady	6	6
8	(Romania) PM Țig	2	1

Second round
(Slovakia) K Kučová	6^{1}	6	6
(United States) A Tatishvili	7^{7}	2	4
Q	(Bulgaria) E Kostova	1	0
7	(Slovenia) P Hercog	6	6
4	(Japan) N Hibino	6	7^{7}
(Serbia) I Jorović	2	6^{5}
(Switzerland) S Vögele	6	4	7
(United States) J Brady	4	6	5

Quarterfinals
(Slovakia) K Kučová	4	1
7	(Slovenia) P Hercog	6	6
4	(Japan) N Hibino	6	6
(Switzerland) S Vögele	2	2

Semifinals
7	(Slovenia) P Hercog	6	6
4	(Japan) N Hibino	0	2

=== Bottom half ===
First round
5	(Croatia) A Konjuh	6	6
(United States) G Min	1	3
WC	(Turkey) İ Soylu	6	0	6
(Israel) J Glushko	3	6	1
LL	(Croatia) A Mijačika	3	4
WC	(Croatia) T Mrdeža	6	6
(Belgium) Y Bonaventure	6	7^{7}
3	(China) S Zhang	4	6^{2}
6	(Japan) K Nara	3^{r}
(New Zealand) M Erakovic	3
WC	(Croatia) T Lukas	2	5
(United States) S Vickery	6	7
(Russia) E Rodina	3	6	5
(Luxembourg) M Minella	6	1	7
WC	(Croatia) A Vrljić	1	5
2	(United States) V Lepchenko	6	7

Second round
5	(Croatia) A Konjuh	6	6
WC	(Turkey) İ Soylu	2	1
WC	(Croatia) T Mrdeža	6	6
(Belgium) Y Bonaventure	3	3
(New Zealand) M Erakovic	6	6
(United States) S Vickery	4	4
(Luxembourg) M Minella	6	6^{4}	6
2	(United States) V Lepchenko	1	7^{7}	4

Quarterfinals
5	(Croatia) A Konjuh	6	7^{7}
WC	(Croatia) T Mrdeža	3	6^{5}
(New Zealand) M Erakovic	5	4
(Luxembourg) M Minella	7	6

Semifinals
5	(Croatia) A Konjuh	3	1^{r}
(Luxembourg) M Minella	6	2
