= 2007 Kremlin Cup – Men's singles =

Men's singles
- 2007 Kremlin Cup

Final
- Champion: (Russia) Nikolay Davydenko
- Runner-up: (France) Paul-Henri Mathieu
- Score: 7–5, 7–6^{(11–9)}

Details
- Draw: 32 (4 Q / 3 WC )
- Seeds: 8

Events
Singles	men	women
Doubles	men	women
← 2006 ·	Kremlin Cup	· 2008 →

Nikolay Davydenko was the defending champion, and won in the final 7–5, 7–6^{(11–9)}, against Paul-Henri Mathieu.

== Seeds ==
1. (Russia) Nikolay Davydenko (champion)
2. (Russia) Mikhail Youzhny (second round)
3. (United Kingdom) Andy Murray (second round)
4. (France) Paul-Henri Mathieu (final)
5. (Russia) Marat Safin (second round)
6. (Italy) Potito Starace (first round)
7. (Russia) Dmitry Tursunov (second round)
8. (Germany) Philipp Kohlschreiber (quarterfinals, retired due to a back injury)

== Draw ==
=== Key ===
- Q = Qualifier
- WC = Wild card
- LL = Lucky loser
- Alt = Alternate
- SE = Special exempt
- PR = Protected ranking
- ITF = ITF entry
- JE = Junior exempt
- w/o = Walkover
- r = Retired
- d = Defaulted
- SR = Special ranking

=== Finals ===
Semifinals
1	(Russia) Nikolay Davydenko	7^{8}	6
(Serbia) Janko Tipsarević	6^{6}	1
4	(France) Paul-Henri Mathieu	7	6
(Germany) Michael Berrer	5	3

Final
1	(Russia) Nikolay Davydenko	7	7^{11}
4	(France) Paul-Henri Mathieu	5	6^{9}

=== Top half ===
First round
1	(Russia) N Davydenko	7^{7}	6
(France) J-W Tsonga	6^{0}	2
(France) F Santoro	6	3	2
(Ecuador) N Lapentti	3	6	6
(France) N Mahut	3	4
(Russia) I Andreev	6	6
Q	(Russia) D Matsukevich	6^{2}	5
5/WC	(Russia) M Safin	7^{7}	7
3	(United Kingdom) A Murray	6	6
(Russia) E Korolev	2	4
(Argentina) S Roitman	6	4	4
(Serbia) J Tipsarević	3	6	6
(Czech Republic) R Štěpánek	7	6
WC	(Russia) T Gabashvili	5	3
Q	(Germany) M Zverev	4	6	4
7	(Russia) D Tursunov	6	3	6

Second round
1	(Russia) N Davydenko	6	6
(Ecuador) N Lapentti	4	4
(Russia) I Andreev	6	6
5/WC	(Russia) M Safin	4	4
3	(United Kingdom) A Murray	4	5
(Serbia) J Tipsarević	6	7
(Czech Republic) R Štěpánek	3	6	6
7	(Russia) D Tursunov	6	3	1

Quarterfinals
1	(Russia) N Davydenko	7	7
(Russia) I Andreev	5	5
(Serbia) J Tipsarević	6	3	6
(Czech Republic) R Štěpánek	4	6	3

Semifinals
1	(Russia) N Davydenko	7^{8}	6
(Serbia) J Tipsarević	6^{6}	1

=== Bottom half ===
First round
6	(Italy) P Starace	6	4	3
(France) F Serra	4	6	6
(Belgium) K Vliegen	6	2
Q	(Serbia) V Troicki	3	2^{r}
WC	(Russia) I Kunitsyn	7^{7}	1	6
(Argentina) D Hartfield	6^{1}	6	1
(France) S Grosjean	2	2
4	(France) P-H Mathieu	6	6
8	(Germany) P Kohlschreiber	6	6
(United States) J Gimelstob	1	3
Q	(Croatia) M Čilić	6	6
(Italy) S Bolelli	3	4
(Germany) M Berrer	6^{5}	7	6
(Argentina) J Acasuso	7^{7}	5	4
(Latvia) E Gulbis	3	2
2	(Russia) M Youzhny	6	6

Second round
(France) F Serra	6^{2}	6	6
(Belgium) K Vliegen	7^{7}	4	2
WC	(Russia) I Kunitsyn	3	4
4	(France) P-H Mathieu	6	6
8	(Germany) P Kohlschreiber	7^{10}	1	6
Q	(Croatia) M Čilić	6^{8}	6	4
(Germany) M Berrer	7	6
2	(Russia) M Youzhny	5	4

Quarterfinals
(France) F Serra	3	3
4	(France) P-H Mathieu	6	6
8	(Germany) P Kohlschreiber	3	0^{r}
(Germany) M Berrer	6	0

Semifinals
4	(France) P-H Mathieu	7	6
(Germany) M Berrer	5	3
