= 2008 Kremlin Cup =

- Date: 6–12 October
- Edition: 19th (men) / 13th (women)
- Surface: Hard / indoor
- Location: Moscow, Russia
- Venue: Olympic Stadium

Champions

Men's singles
- (Russia) Igor Kunitsyn

Women's singles
- (Serbia) Jelena Janković

Men's doubles
- (Ukraine) Sergiy Stakhovsky / (Italy) Potito Starace

Women's doubles
- (Russia) Nadia Petrova / (Slovenia) Katarina Srebotnik
← 2007 ·	Kremlin Cup	· 2009 →

The 2008 Kremlin Cup was a tennis tournament played on indoor hard courts. It was the 19th edition of the Kremlin Cup, and was part of the International Series of the 2008 ATP Tour, and of the Tier I Series of the 2008 WTA Tour. It took place at the Olympic Stadium in Moscow, Russia, from 6 October through 12 October 2008.

The men's field was headlined by ATP No. 6, Miami Masters, Portschach, Warsaw champion, and Moscow three-time winner, defending champion Nikolay Davydenko, Gstaad and Umag runner-up Igor Andreev, and Australian Open quarterfinalist, Chennai champion Mikhail Youzhny. Also lined up were Metz finalist, 2002 Moscow champion Paul-Henri Mathieu, Sydney and Metz titlist Dmitry Tursunov, Michaël Llodra, Marat Safin and Janko Tipsarević.

The women's draw –the strongest in nineteen years– was led by World No. 1, US Open runner-up, Rome, Beijing, Stuttgart titlist Jelena Janković, French Open finalist, Berlin, Los Angeles, Montreal, Tokyo titlist Dinara Safina, and Olympic gold, Dubai winner, defending champion Elena Dementieva. Other seeds included French Open champion and Australian Open finalist Ana Ivanovic, Indian Wells, Tokyo, and Beijing runner-up Svetlana Kuznetsova, Venus Williams, Vera Zvonareva and Anna Chakvetadze. First-seeded Jelena Janković won the singles title.

== Finals ==
=== Men's singles ===
(Russia) Igor Kunitsyn defeated (Russia) Marat Safin, 7–6^{(8–6)}, 6–7^{(4–7)}, 6–3

- It was Igor Kunitsyn's 1st career title, and proved to be Marat Safin's last final before his retirement in 2009.

=== Women's singles ===
(Serbia) Jelena Janković defeated (Russia) Vera Zvonareva, 6–2, 6–4

- It was Jelena Janković's 4th title of the year, and her 9th overall. It was her 2nd Tier I title of the year, and her 4th overall.

=== Men's doubles ===
(Ukraine) Sergiy Stakhovsky / (Italy) Potito Starace defeated (Australia) Stephen Huss / (United Kingdom) Ross Hutchins, 7–6^{(7–4)}, 2–6, [10–6]

- It was Stakhovsky's 1st title of the year and the 1st of his career. It was Starace's 1st title of the year and the 3rd of his career.

=== Women's doubles ===
(Russia) Nadia Petrova / (Slovenia) Katarina Srebotnik defeated (Zimbabwe) Cara Black / (United States) Liezel Huber, 6–4, 6–4

- It was Petrova's 3rd title of the year and the 15th of his career. It was Srebotnik's 3rd title of the year and the 19th of his career.
