= 2005 Qatar Total German Open =

- Date: 2–8 May
- Edition: 94th
- Category: Tier I
- Draw: 56S / 28D
- Prize money: $1,300,000
- Surface: Clay / outdoor
- Location: Berlin, Germany
- Venue: Rot-Weiss Tennis Club

Champions

Singles
- (Belgium) Justine Henin-Hardenne

Doubles
- (Russia) Elena Likhovtseva / (Russia) Vera Zvonareva
- WTA German Open

The 2005 Qatar Total German Open was a women's tennis event that was played in Berlin, Germany from 2 May until 8 May 2005. It was one of two Tier I events that took place on red clay in the build-up to the second Grand Slam of the year, the French Open. It was the 94th edition of the tournament. Justine Henin-Hardenne, who was seeded 12th, won her third singles title at the event.

== Finals ==
=== Singles ===
(Belgium) Justine Henin-Hardenne defeated (Russia) Nadia Petrova, 6–3, 4–6, 6–3

- It was Henin's 3rd singles title of the year and the 22nd of her career.

=== Doubles ===
(Russia) Elena Likhovtseva / (Russia) Vera Zvonareva defeated (Zimbabwe) Cara Black / (South Africa) Liezel Huber, 4–6, 6–4, 6–3

== Prize money ==
Event	W	F	SF	QF	Round of 16	Round of 32	Round of 64
Singles	$189,000	$96,000	$49,125	$25,050	$12,775	$6,500	$3,325
