= 2008 Kremlin Cup – Men's singles =

Men's singles
- 2008 Kremlin Cup

Final
- Champion: (Russia) Igor Kunitsyn
- Runner-up: (Russia) Marat Safin
- Score: 7–6^{(8–6)}, 6–7^{(4–7)}, 6–3

Details
- Draw: 32 (4 Q / 3 WC )
- Seeds: 8

Events
Singles	men	women
Doubles	men	women
← 2007 ·	Kremlin Cup	· 2009 →

Nikolay Davydenko was the defending champion, but lost in the quarterfinals to Marat Safin.

Unseeded Igor Kunitsyn won in the final 7–6^{(8–6)}, 6–7^{(4–7)}, 6–3, against first-seeded Marat Safin.

== Seeds ==
1. (Russia) Nikolay Davydenko (quarterfinals)
2. (Russia) Igor Andreev (second round)
3. (Russia) Mikhail Youzhny (first round)
4. (France) Paul-Henri Mathieu (quarterfinals, retired)
5. (Russia) Dmitry Tursunov (withdrew due to a shoulder injury)
6. (France) Michaël Llodra (first round)
7. (Russia) Marat Safin (final)
8. (Serbia) Janko Tipsarević (second round)

== Draw ==
=== Key ===
- Q = Qualifier
- WC = Wild card
- LL = Lucky loser
- Alt = Alternate
- SE = Special exempt
- PR = Protected ranking
- ITF = ITF entry
- JE = Junior exempt
- w/o = Walkover
- r = Retired
- d = Defaulted
- SR = Special ranking

=== Finals ===
Semifinals
7	(Russia) Marat Safin	w/o
(Germany) Mischa Zverev
(France) Fabrice Santoro	4	3
(Russia) Igor Kunitsyn	6	6

Final
7	(Russia) Marat Safin	6^{6}	7^{7}	3
(Russia) Igor Kunitsyn	7^{8}	6^{4}	6

=== Top half ===
First round
1	(Russia) N Davydenko	6	7
(France) F Serra	1	5
(France) N Devilder	2	4
(Spain) G García López	6	6
Q	(Israel) H Levy	4	3
(France) J Benneteau	6	6
Q	(Israel) N Okun	6^{5}	6	4
7	(Russia) M Safin	7^{7}	3	6
3	(Russia) M Youzhny	5	6	6^{1}
(Russia) T Gabashvili	7	4	7^{7}
(Germany) M Zverev	6	7^{9}
(Germany) D Gremelmayr	3	6^{7}
(Serbia) V Troicki	6	6
WC	(Russia) E Donskoy	1	3
WC	(Russia) A Kudryavtsev	6	3	6^{6}
8	(Serbia) J Tipsarević	4	6	7^{8}

Second round
1	(Russia) N Davydenko	6	6
(Spain) G García López	1	1
(France) J Benneteau	4	6	2
7	(Russia) M Safin	6	0	6
(Russia) T Gabashvili	2	6	1
(Germany) M Zverev	6	2	6
(Serbia) V Troicki	6	6
8	(Serbia) J Tipsarević	3	4

Quarterfinals
1	(Russia) N Davydenko	6^{5}	6	4
7	(Russia) M Safin	7^{7}	4	6
(Germany) M Zverev	6	3	7
(Serbia) V Troicki	4	6	5

Semifinals
7	(Russia) M Safin	w/o
(Germany) M Zverev

=== Bottom half ===
First round
6	(France) M Llodra	6^{2}	3
Q	(Uzbekistan) D Istomin	7^{7}	6
(France) F Santoro	4	7^{7}	6
WC	(Kazakhstan) Y Schukin	6	6^{2}	4
(Israel) D Sela	6	3	6
(Romania) V Hănescu	3	6	2
(Ukraine) S Stakhovsky	3	2
4	(France) P-H Mathieu	6	6
LL	(Kazakhstan) M Kukushkin	1	6	1
(Russia) I Kunitsyn	6	4	6
(United States) R Ginepri	6	6
Q	(Czech Republic) J Vaněk	3	4
(Italy) P Starace	6	1	4
(France) J Chardy	3	6	6
(Chinese Taipei) Y-h Lu	2	r
2	(Russia) I Andreev	6

Second round
Q	(Uzbekistan) D Istomin	2	4
(France) F Santoro	6	6
(Israel) D Sela	7	5	6^{0}
4	(France) P-H Mathieu	6^{3}	7	7^{7}
(Russia) I Kunitsyn	6	6
(United States) R Ginepri	4	3
(France) J Chardy	3	7	6
2	(Russia) I Andreev	6	5	4

Quarterfinals
(France) F Santoro	6	2
4	(France) P-H Mathieu	3	0^{r}
(Russia) I Kunitsyn	6	6
(France) J Chardy	4	2

Semifinals
(France) F Santoro	4	3
(Russia) I Kunitsyn	6	6
