= 2016 Bol Open =

Croatian tennis tournament

- Date: 31 May – 5 June
- Edition: 11th
- Category: WTA 125K series
- Prize money: $125,000
- Surface: Clay
- Location: Bol, Croatia
- Venue: Bluesun Tennis Center Zlatni rat

Champions

Singles
- (Luxembourg) Mandy Minella

Doubles
- (Switzerland) Xenia Knoll / (Croatia) Petra Martić
| ← 2003 · | Bol Open | · 2017 → |

The 2016 Bol Open was a professional tennis tournament played on outdoor clay courts in Bol, Croatia. The tournament's first edition was held in late April 1991, and then again every year from 1996 to 2003. The tournament returned for 2016 as part of the WTA 125K series.

== Singles entrants ==
=== Seeds ===
| Country | Player | Rank^{1} | Seed |
|---|---|---|---|
| SVK | Anna Karolína Schmiedlová | 38 | 1 |
| USA | Varvara Lepchenko | 64 | 2 |
| CHN | Zhang Shuai | 69 | 3 |
| JPN | Nao Hibino | 71 | 4 |
| CRO | Ana Konjuh | 76 | 5 |
| JPN | Kurumi Nara | 91 | 6 |
| SLO | Polona Hercog | 94 | 7 |
| ROU | Patricia Maria Țig | 99 | 8 |

- ^{1} Rankings as of 23 May 2016.

=== Other entrants ===
The following players received wildcards into the singles main draw:

- (Croatia) Tereza Mrdeža
- (Croatia) Tena Lukas
- (Slovakia) Anna Karolína Schmiedlová
- (Turkey) İpek Soylu
- (Croatia) Ana Vrljić

The following players received entry from the qualifying draw:

- (Russia) Ekaterina Alexandrova
- (Bulgaria) Elitsa Kostova
- (France) Marine Partaud
- (Bulgaria) Isabella Shinikova

The following players received entry as a lucky loser:

- (Croatia) Ani Mijačika

=== Withdrawals ===
Before the tournament

- (Czech Republic) Denisa Allertová→replaced by Rebecca Peterson
- (Netherlands) Kiki Bertens→replaced by Jennifer Brady
- (Turkey) Çağla Büyükakçay→replaced by Ysaline Bonaventure
- (Romania) Sorana Cîrstea→replaced by Marina Erakovic
- (Colombia) Mariana Duque Mariño→replaced by Julia Glushko
- (Belgium) Kirsten Flipkens →replaced by Ivana Jorović
- (Kazakhstan) Yulia Putintseva →replaced by Paula Kania
- (Sweden) Johanna Larsson →replaced by Petra Martić
- (Poland) Magda Linette →replaced by Sachia Vickery
- (Brazil) Teliana Pereira →replaced by Kristína Kučová
- (Bulgaria) Tsvetana Pironkova →replaced by Grace Min

During the tournament

- (Sweden) Rebecca Peterson→replaced by Ani Mijačika

== Doubles entrants ==
=== Seeds ===
| Country | Player | Country | Player | Rank^{1} | Seed |
|---|---|---|---|---|---|
| ROU | Raluca Olaru | TUR | İpek Soylu | 170 | 1 |
| TPE | Chan Chin-wei | CZE | Renata Voráčová | 180 | 2 |
| ISR | Julia Glushko | POL | Paula Kania | 214 | 3 |
| SUI | Xenia Knoll | CRO | Petra Martić | 219 | 4 |

- ^{1} Rankings as of May 23, 2016 .

=== Other entrants ===
The following pairs received a wildcard into the doubles main draw:

- (Croatia) Tena Lukas / (India) Prarthana Thombare
- (Croatia) Ani Mijačika / (France) Marine Partaud

== Champions ==
=== Singles ===
- (Luxembourg) Mandy Minella def. (Slovenia) Polona Hercog, 6–2, 6–3

=== Doubles ===
- (Switzerland) Xenia Knoll / (Croatia) Petra Martić def. (Romania) Raluca Olaru / (Turkey) İpek Soylu, 6–3, 6–2
