= 2007 Kremlin Cup =

- Date: 8–14 October
- Edition: 18th (men) / 12th (women)
- Surface: Hard / indoor
- Location: Moscow, Russia
- Venue: Olympic Stadium

Champions

Men's singles
- (Russia) Nikolay Davydenko

Women's singles
- (Russia) Elena Dementieva

Men's doubles
- (Russia) Marat Safin / (Russia) Dmitry Tursunov

Women's doubles
- (Zimbabwe) Cara Black / (United States) Liezel Huber
← 2006 ·	Kremlin Cup	· 2008 →

The 2007 Kremlin Cup was a tennis tournament played on indoor hard courts. It was the 18th edition of the Kremlin Cup, and was part of the International Series of the 2007 ATP Tour, and of the Tier I Series of the 2007 WTA Tour. It took place at the Olympic Stadium in Moscow, Russia, from 8 October through 14 October 2007.

The men's field featured ATP No. 4, French Open and US Open semifinalist, Moscow two-time winner, defending champion Nikolay Davydenko, Dubai and Munich finalist, Rotterdam titlist Mikhail Youzhny, and Doha and Metz runner-up, San Jose champion Andy Murray. Also present were Casablanca and Gstaad winner, 2002 Moscow champion Paul-Henri Mathieu, former World No. 1 Marat Safin, Potito Starace, Dmitry Tursunov and Philipp Kohlschreiber.

The women's draw was led by WTA No. 2, US Open, Indian Wells, Berlin and Rome runner-up, New Haven titlist Svetlana Kuznetsova, Australian Open finalist, San Diego winner Maria Sharapova, and Hobart, 's-Hertogenbosch, Cincinnati, Stanford winner, defending champion Anna Chakvetadze. Other seeds were Australian Open champion Serena Williams, Wimbledon runner-up Marion Bartoli, Amélie Mauresmo, Patty Schnyder and Nicole Vaidišová. Unseeded Elena Dementieva won the singles title.

== Finals ==
=== Men's singles ===
(Russia) Nikolay Davydenko defeated (France) Paul-Henri Mathieu, 7–5, 7–6^{(11–9)}

- It was Nikolay Davydenko's 1st title of the year, and his 11th overall. It was his 3rd win at the event, and his 2nd consecutive one.

=== Women's singles ===
(Russia) Elena Dementieva defeated (United States) Serena Williams, 5–7, 6–1, 6–1

- It was Elena Dementieva's 2nd title of the year, and her 8th overall. It was her 1st Tier I title of the year, and her 2nd overall.

=== Men's doubles ===
(Russia) Marat Safin / (Russia) Dmitry Tursunov defeated (Czech Republic) Tomáš Cibulec / (Croatia) Lovro Zovko, 6–4, 6–2

- It was Safin's 1st title of the year and the 2nd of his career. It was Tursunov's 1st title of the year and the 1st of his career.

=== Women's doubles ===
(Zimbabwe) Cara Black / (United States) Liezel Huber defeated (Belarus) Victoria Azarenka / (Belarus) Tatiana Poutchek, 4–6, 6–1, [10–7]

- It was Black's 7th title of the year and the 44th of his career. It was Huber's 7th title of the year and the 22nd of his career.
