= 2007 Kremlin Cup – Men's doubles =

Men's doubles
- 2007 Kremlin Cup

Final
- Champions: (Russia) Marat Safin (Russia) Dmitry Tursunov
- Runners-up: (Czech Republic) Tomáš Cibulec (Croatia) Lovro Zovko
- Score: 6–4, 6–2

Details
- Draw: 16
- Seeds: 4

Events
Singles	men	women
Doubles	men	women
← 2006 ·	Kremlin Cup	· 2008 →

Fabrice Santoro and Nenad Zimonjić were the defending champions, but Santoro chose not to participate, and only Zimonjic competed that year.
Zimonjic partnered with Daniel Nestor, but lost in the quarterfinals to Sébastien Grosjean and Jo-Wilfried Tsonga.

Marat Safin and Dmitry Tursunov won in the final 6–4, 6–2, against Tomáš Cibulec and Lovro Zovko.

== Seeds ==
1. (Canada) Daniel Nestor / (Serbia) Nenad Zimonjić (quarterfinals)
2. (Czech Republic) Lukáš Dlouhý / (Czech Republic) Pavel Vízner (quarterfinals)
3. (Czech Republic) František Čermák / (Czech Republic) Leoš Friedl (semifinals)
4. (Austria) Oliver Marach / (Slovakia) Michal Mertiňák (quarterfinals)

== Draw ==
=== Key ===
- Q = Qualifier
- WC = Wild card
- LL = Lucky loser
- Alt = Alternate
- SE = Special exempt
- PR = Protected ranking
- ITF = ITF entry
- JE = Junior exempt
- w/o = Walkover
- r = Retired
- d = Defaulted
- SR = Special ranking

=== Draw ===
First round
1	(Canada) D Nestor (Serbia) N Zimonjić	4	6	[10]
WC	(Russia) I Andreev (Russia) Y Schukin	6	1	[6]
(Germany) M Berrer (Germany) P Kohlschreiber	3	7	[4]
(France) S Grosjean (France) J-W Tsonga	6	5	[10]
4	(Austria) O Marach (Slovakia) M Mertiňák	3	6	[10]
(Argentina) S Roitman (Italy) P Starace	6	4	[8]
(Russia) E Korolev (Russia) I Kunitsyn	5	3
(Russia) M Safin (Russia) D Tursunov	7	6
WC	(Russia) T Gabashvili (Germany) M Zverev	6	3	[5]
(Argentina) J Acasuso (Argentina) D Hartfield	3	6	[10]
(Switzerland) Y Allegro (Belgium) K Vliegen	3	4
3	(Czech Republic) F Čermák (Czech Republic) L Friedl	6	6
(United States) J Gimelstob (Australia) S Huss	6^{3}	1
(Czech Republic) T Cibulec (Croatia) L Zovko	7^{7}	6
(Serbia) J Tipsarević (Russia) M Youzhny	3	6^{7}
2	(Czech Republic) L Dlouhý (Czech Republic) P Vízner	6	7^{9}

Quarterfinals
1	(Canada) D Nestor (Serbia) N Zimonjić	7	4	[8]
(France) S Grosjean (France) J-W Tsonga	5	6	[10]
4	(Austria) O Marach (Slovakia) M Mertiňák	3	4
(Russia) M Safin (Russia) D Tursunov	6	6
(Argentina) J Acasuso (Argentina) D Hartfield	2	3
3	(Czech Republic) F Čermák (Czech Republic) L Friedl	6	6
(Czech Republic) T Cibulec (Croatia) L Zovko	6	6
2	(Czech Republic) L Dlouhý (Czech Republic) P Vízner	2	2

Semifinals
(France) S Grosjean (France) J-W Tsonga	6^{5}	4
(Russia) M Safin (Russia) D Tursunov	7^{7}	6
3	(Czech Republic) F Čermák (Czech Republic) L Friedl	6	4	[3]
(Czech Republic) T Cibulec (Croatia) L Zovko	4	6	[10]

Final
(Russia) M Safin (Russia) D Tursunov	6	6
(Czech Republic) T Cibulec (Croatia) L Zovko	4	2
