= 2004 Acura Classic – Singles =

Singles
- 2004 Acura Classic

Final
- Champion: (United States) Lindsay Davenport
- Runner-up: (Russia) Anastasia Myskina
- Score: 6–1, 6–1

Details
- Draw: 56
- Seeds: 16

Events
| Singles | Doubles |
- San Diego Open

Lindsay Davenport defeated Anastasia Myskina in the final, 6–1, 6–1 to win the singles tennis title at the 2004 Southern California Open.

Justine Henin was the reigning champion, but withdrew due to a virus.

== Seeds ==
The first eight seeds received a bye into the second round.

1. (United States) Serena Williams (quarterfinals, withdrew due to a left knee inflammation)
2. (France) Amélie Mauresmo (second round)
3. (Russia) Anastasia Myskina (final)
4. (United States) Lindsay Davenport (champion)
5. (Russia) Elena Dementieva (semifinals)
6. (Russia) Maria Sharapova (quarterfinals)
7. (Russia) Svetlana Kuznetsova (third round)
8. (Japan) Ai Sugiyama (quarterfinals)
9. (Argentina) Paola Suárez (second round)
10. (Russia) Nadia Petrova (first round)
11. (United States) ~~Venus Williams~~ (withdrew due to a right wrist sprain)
12. (Russia) Vera Zvonareva (semifinals)
13. (Switzerland) Patty Schnyder (first round)
14. (Israel) Anna Smashnova-Pistolesi (first round)
15. (Italy) Francesca Schiavone (first round)
16. (Italy) Silvia Farina Elia (first round)

== Draw ==
Key

- Q = Qualifier
- WC = Wild card
- LL = Lucky loser
- Alt = Alternate
- ITF = ITF entry
- PR = Protected ranking
- SR = Special ranking
- SE = Special exempt
- JE = Junior exempt
- JR = Junior Accelerator Programme entrant
- CO = College Accelerator Programme entrant
- NG = Next Gen Accelerator Program entrant
- w/o = Walkover
- r = Retired
- d = Defaulted

=== Finals ===
Quarterfinals
1/PR | (United States) Serena Williams
12 | (Russia) Vera Zvonareva | w/o
3 | (Russia) Anastasia Myskina | 7 | 6
6 | (Russia) Maria Sharapova | 5 | 2
8 | (Japan) Ai Sugiyama | 1 | 3
4 | (United States) Lindsay Davenport | 6 | 6
5 | (Russia) Elena Dementieva | 6 | 6
(United States) Amy Frazier | 2 | 1

Semifinals
12 | (Russia) Vera Zvonareva | 2 | 7^{7} | 6^{15}
3 | (Russia) Anastasia Myskina | 6 | 6^{4} | 7^{17}
4 | (United States) Lindsay Davenport | 6 | 6
5 | (Russia) Elena Dementieva | 2 | 4

Final
3 | (Russia) Anastasia Myskina | 1 | 1
4 | (United States) Lindsay Davenport | 6 | 6

=== Top half ===
==== Section 1 ====
First round
WC | (United States) A Liu | 6^{4} | 0
(Serbia and Montenegro) J Janković | 7^{7} | 6
(United States) L Raymond | 5 | 0
(Greece) E Daniilidou | 7 | 6
(Russia) E Bovina | 6 | 3 | 6
15 | (Italy) F Schiavone | 3 | 6 | 4
12 | (Russia) V Zvonareva | 6 | 7^{7}
(France) N Dechy | 4 | 6^{5}
(Japan) S Obata | 6 | 5 | 5
(Spain) M Sánchez Lorenzo | 4 | 7 | 7
(Slovakia) D Hantuchová | 7^{7} | 6
Q | (United States) M Irvin | 6^{3} | 3

Second round
1/PR | (United States) S Williams | 6^{3} | 6 | 6
(Serbia and Montenegro) J Janković | 7^{7} | 3 | 2
(Greece) E Daniilidou | 1 | 4
(Russia) E Bovina | 6 | 6
12 | (Russia) V Zvonareva | 6 | 6
(Spain) M Sánchez Lorenzo | 0 | 3
(Slovakia) D Hantuchová | 1 | 2
7 | (Russia) S Kuznetsova | 6 | 6

Third round
1/PR | (United States) S Williams | 6 | 6
(Russia) E Bovina | 4 | 2
12 | (Russia) V Zvonareva | 6 | 6
7 | (Russia) S Kuznetsova | 2 | 3

Quarterfinals
1/PR | (United States) S Williams
12 | (Russia) V Zvonareva | w/o

==== Section 2 ====
First round
WC | (Austria) B Schett | 7 | 6^{8} | 6
Q | (United States) J Craybas | 5 | 7^{10} | 2
(Croatia) J Kostanić | 6 | 6
(Germany) A Barna | 2 | 1
(United States) C Rubin | 6 | 6
14 | (Israel) A Smashnova-Pistolesi | 0 | 3
LL | (Thailand) T Tanasugarn | 3 | 4
(Argentina) G Dulko | 6 | 6
(France) M Pierce | 6 | 6
(Luxembourg) C Schaul | 4 | 2
(Venezuela) M Vento-Kabchi | 6^{5} | 2
Q | (United States) L Osterloh | 7^{7} | 6

Second round
3 | (Russia) A Myskina | 6 | 6
WC | (Austria) B Schett | 3 | 4
(Croatia) J Kostanić | 4 | 3
(United States) C Rubin | 6 | 6
(Argentina) G Dulko | 6 | 7^{7}
(France) M Pierce | 3 | 6^{1}
Q | (United States) L Osterloh | 3 | 3
6 | (Russia) M Sharapova | 6 | 6

Third round
3 | (Russia) A Myskina | 6 | 6
(United States) C Rubin | 1 | 2
(Argentina) G Dulko | 0 | 1
6 | (Russia) M Sharapova | 6 | 6

Quarterfinals
3 | (Russia) A Myskina | 7 | 6
6 | (Russia) M Sharapova | 5 | 2

=== Bottom half ===
==== Section 3 ====
First round
(Japan) S Asagoe | 6 | 0
(United States) M Shaughnessy | 2 | 0^{r}
Q | (France) M Bartoli | 6 | 6
(Colombia) F Zuluaga | 3 | 4
(Hungary) A Kapros | 1 | 3
9 | (Argentina) P Suárez | 6 | 6
16 | (Italy) S Farina Elia | 2 | 4
(Czech Republic) I Benešová | 6 | 6
(France) É Loit | 1 | 2
(Spain) C Martínez | 6 | 6
(Spain) M Marrero | 3 | 2
(Croatia) K Šprem | 6 | 6

Second round
8 | (Japan) A Sugiyama | 6 | 6
(Japan) S Asagoe | 2 | 2
Q | (France) M Bartoli | 6 | 6
9 | (Argentina) P Suárez | 3 | 0
(Czech Republic) I Benešová | 3 | 4
(Spain) C Martínez | 6 | 6
(Croatia) K Šprem | 4 | 0
4 | (United States) L Davenport | 6 | 6

Third round
8 | (Japan) A Sugiyama | 6 | 6
Q | (France) M Bartoli | 3 | 2
(Spain) C Martínez | 1 | 2
4 | (United States) L Davenport | 6 | 6

Quarterfinals
8 | (Japan) A Sugiyama | 1 | 3
4 | (United States) L Davenport | 6 | 6

==== Section 4 ====
First round
(Puerto Rico) K Brandi | 6 | 1 | 7
(Japan) A Morigami | 3 | 6 | 5
(Czech Republic) B Strýcová | 6 | 5 | 7
WC | (Spain) V Ruano Pascual | 4 | 7 | 5
(Russia) E Likhovtseva | 6 | 1 | 6
10 | (Russia) N Petrova | 4 | 6 | 4
13 | (Switzerland) P Schnyder | 4 | 6 | 5
WC | (United States) A Harkleroad | 6 | 3 | 7
(Hungary) P Mandula | 4 | 4
(United States) A Frazier | 6 | 6
(Australia) A Molik | 6 | 6
(Australia) N Pratt | 3 | 4

Second round
5 | (Russia) E Dementieva | 6 | 6
(Puerto Rico) K Brandi | 1 | 1
(Czech Republic) B Strýcová | 4 | 3
(Russia) E Likhovtseva | 6 | 6
WC | (United States) A Harkleroad | 2 | 0
(United States) A Frazier | 6 | 6
(Australia) A Molik | 7 | 3 | 6
2 | (France) A Mauresmo | 5 | 6 | 3

Third round
5 | (Russia) E Dementieva | 6 | 7^{7}
(Russia) E Likhovtseva | 2 | 6^{2}
(United States) A Frazier | 3 | 6 | 6
(Australia) A Molik | 6 | 3 | 4

Quarterfinals
5 | (Russia) E Dementieva | 6 | 6
(United States) A Frazier | 2 | 1
