= 2007 Kremlin Cup – Women's doubles =

Women's doubles
- 2007 Kremlin Cup

Final
- Champions: (Zimbabwe) Cara Black (United States) Liezel Huber
- Runners-up: (Belarus) Victoria Azarenka (Belarus) Tatiana Poutchek
- Score: 4–6, 6–1, 10–7

Details
- Seeds: 4

Events
Singles	men	women
Doubles	men	women
← 2006 ·	Kremlin Cup	· 2008 →

Květa Peschke and Francesca Schiavone were the defending champions, but Schiavone chose not to participate, and only Peschke competed that year.
Peschke partnered with Rennae Stubbs, but lost in the quarterfinals to Iveta Benešová and Galina Voskoboeva.

Cara Black and Liezel Huber won in the final 4–6, 6–1, 10–7, against Victoria Azarenka and Tatiana Poutchek.

== Seeds ==
1. (Zimbabwe) Cara Black / (United States) Liezel Huber (champions)
2. (Czech Republic) Květa Peschke / (Australia) Rennae Stubbs (quarterfinals)
3. (Russia) Elena Likhovtseva / (Russia) Dinara Safina (semifinals)
4. (Netherlands) Michaëlla Krajicek / (Czech Republic) Vladimíra Uhlířová (first round)

== Draw ==
=== Key ===
- Q = Qualifier
- WC = Wild card
- LL = Lucky loser
- Alt = Alternate
- SE = Special exempt
- PR = Protected ranking
- ITF = ITF entry
- JE = Junior exempt
- w/o = Walkover
- r = Retired
- d = Defaulted
- SR = Special ranking

First round
1	(Zimbabwe) C Black (United States) L Huber	6	6
(Russia) M Kirilenko (Russia) E Vesnina	2	3
(Russia) V Dushevina (Ukraine) T Perebiynis	1	3
(India) S Mirza (Switzerland) P Schnyder	6	6
3	(Russia) E Likhovtseva (Russia) D Safina	6	6
(Russia) A Chakvetadze (Russia) V Zvonareva	3	3
(Russia) A Jidkova (Belarus) D Kustova	4	6	[10]
WC	(Russia) E Makarova (Russia) E Rodina	6	2	[3]
(Belarus) V Azarenka (Belarus) T Poutchek	6	6
(Australia) A Molik (Poland) A Radwańska	2	3
(France) É Loit (United States) M Tu	6	6
4	(Netherlands) M Krajicek (Czech Republic) V Uhlířová	4	4
(Czech Republic) I Benešová (Russia) G Voskoboeva	6	6
(Greece) E Daniilidou (Germany) J Wöhr	3	2
(Russia) A Kudryavtseva (Germany) M Müller	1	5
2	(Czech Republic) K Peschke (Australia) R Stubbs	6	7

Quarterfinals
1	(Zimbabwe) C Black (United States) L Huber	6	5	[10]
(India) S Mirza (Switzerland) P Schnyder	3	7	[7]
3	(Russia) E Likhovtseva (Russia) D Safina	6	6
(Russia) A Jidkova (Belarus) D Kustova	2	2
(Belarus) V Azarenka (Belarus) T Poutchek	6	6
(France) É Loit (United States) M Tu	3	3
(Czech Republic) I Benešová (Russia) G Voskoboeva	2	7	[10]
2	(Czech Republic) K Peschke (Australia) R Stubbs	6	6^{1}	[8]

Semifinals
1	(Zimbabwe) C Black (United States) L Huber	6	6
3	(Russia) E Likhovtseva (Russia) D Safina	4	1
(Belarus) V Azarenka (Belarus) T Poutchek	6	1	[10]
(Czech Republic) I Benešová (Russia) G Voskoboeva	1	6	[8]

Final
1	(Zimbabwe) C Black (United States) L Huber	4	6	[10]
(Belarus) V Azarenka (Belarus) T Poutchek	6	1	[7]
