= 2005 Qatar Total German Open – Singles =

Singles
- 2005 Qatar Total German Open

Final
- Champion: (Belgium) Justine Henin-Hardenne
- Runner-up: (Russia) Nadia Petrova
- Score: 6–3, 4–6, 6–3

Details
- Draw: 56
- Seeds: 16

Events
Singles	Doubles
← 2004 ·	WTA German Open	· 2006 →

Justine Henin-Hardenne defeated Nadia Petrova in the final, 6–3, 4–6, 6–3 to win the singles tennis title at the 2005 WTA German Open.

Amélie Mauresmo was the defending champion, but lost in the quarterfinals to Petrova.

== Seeds ==
1. (Russia) Maria Sharapova (quarterfinals)
2. (France) Amélie Mauresmo (quarterfinals)
3. (Russia) Anastasia Myskina (second round)
4. (Russia) Svetlana Kuznetsova (quarterfinals)
5. (Russia) Vera Zvonareva (second round)
6. (Russia) Nadia Petrova (final)
7. (Switzerland) Patty Schnyder (semifinals)
8. (Russia) Elena Bovina (quarterfinals)
9. (France) Nathalie Dechy (first round)
10. (Russia) Elena Likhovtseva (second round)
11. (Belgium) Kim Clijsters (third round)
12. (Belgium) Justine Henin-Hardenne (champion)
13. (Serbia and Montenegro) Jelena Janković (semifinals)
14. (Japan) Ai Sugiyama (first round)
15. (Slovakia) Daniela Hantuchová (first round)
16. (Croatia) Karolina Šprem (first round)

== Draw ==
=== Key ===
- Q = Qualifier
- WC = Wild card
- LL = Lucky loser
- Alt = Alternate
- SE = Special exempt
- PR = Protected ranking
- ITF = ITF entry
- JE = Junior exempt
- w/o = Walkover
- r = Retired
- d = Defaulted
- SR = Special ranking

=== Finals ===
Quarterfinals
1	(Russia) Maria Sharapova	2	4
12	(Belgium) Justine Henin-Hardenne	6	6
4	(Russia) Svetlana Kuznetsova	2	2
7	(Switzerland) Patty Schnyder	6	6
8	(Russia) Elena Bovina	3	6	3
13	(Serbia and Montenegro) Jelena Janković	6	3	6
6	(Russia) Nadia Petrova	6	6
2	(France) Amélie Mauresmo	2	3

Semifinals
12	(Belgium) Justine Henin-Hardenne	6	6
7	(Switzerland) Patty Schnyder	0	1
13	(Serbia and Montenegro) Jelena Janković	4	7	3
6	(Russia) Nadia Petrova	6	6^{5}	6

Finals
12	(Belgium) Justine Henin-Hardenne	6	4	6
6	(Russia) Nadia Petrova	3	6	3

=== Top half ===
==== Section 1 ====
First round
(Germany) AL Grönefeld	6	6
(Russia) E Linetskaya	1	2
(Russia) A Jidkova	3	1
(Venezuela) M Vento-Kabchi	6	6
(China) S Peng	7	6
14	(Japan) A Sugiyama	5	4
12	(Belgium) J Henin-Hardenne	7	4	6
(Czech Republic) I Benešová	5	6	1
(Colombia) F Zuluaga	3	1
(Russia) M Kirilenko	6	6
Q	(Czech Republic) K Peschke	6	7
LL	(United States) A Haynes	2	6^{4}

Second round
1	(Russia) M Sharapova	6	6
(Germany) AL Grönefeld	2	2
(Venezuela) M Vento-Kabchi	1	2
(China) S Peng	6	6
12	(Belgium) J Henin-Hardenne	2	6	6
(Russia) M Kirilenko	6	1	3
Q	(Czech Republic) K Peschke	6	6
5	(Russia) V Zvonareva	2	0

Third round
1	(Russia) M Sharapova	6	6
(China) S Peng	2	1
12	(Belgium) J Henin-Hardenne	4	6	6
Q	(Czech Republic) K Peschke	6	4	2

Quarterfinals
1	(Russia) M Sharapova	4	2
12	(Belgium) J Henin-Hardenne	6	6

==== Section 2 ====
First round
(Bulgaria) M Maleeva	6	6
(Russia) V Dushevina	3	1
Q	(Germany) M Müller	0	6^{5}
(Spain) C Martínez	6	7
(Argentina) G Dulko	6	6
15	(Slovakia) D Hantuchová	4	4
11	(Belgium) K Clijsters	6	6
Q	(Ukraine) Y Fedak	1	0
(Russia) D Safina	6	6
(Serbia and Montenegro) A Ivanovic	1	4
Q	(Russia) T Panova	6^{4}	2
(Spain) A Medina Garrigues	7	6

Second round
4	(Russia) S Kuznetsova	6	6
(Bulgaria) M Maleeva	2	1
(Spain) C Martínez	6	6
(Argentina) G Dulko	1	3
11	(Belgium) K Clijsters	7	6
(Russia) D Safina	5	2
(Spain) A Medina Garrigues	6^{2}	4
7	(Switzerland) P Schnyder	7	6

Third round
4	(Russia) S Kuznetsova	5	6	6
(Spain) C Martínez	7	4	4
11	(Belgium) K Clijsters	7	5^{r}
7	(Switzerland) P Schnyder	6^{4}	6

Quarterfinals
4	(Russia) S Kuznetsova	2	2
7	(Switzerland) P Schnyder	6	6

=== Bottom half ===
==== Section 3 ====
First round
Q	(Czech Republic) K Böhmová	7	3	6^{5}
(Greece) E Daniilidou	6^{5}	6	7
(United States) M Shaughnessy	4	6	7
Q	(Czech Republic) L Průšová	6	3	6^{0}
(Madagascar) D Randriantefy	7	6
9	(France) N Dechy	5	1
13	(Serbia and Montenegro) J Janković	6	6
Q	(Israel) T Obziler	3	3
WC	(Germany) A Barna	1	2
(Italy) F Pennetta	6	6
(Czech Republic) D Chládková	6	5	4
WC	(Germany) J Schruff	3	7	6

Second round
8	(Russia) E Bovina	7	5	6
(Greece) E Daniilidou	5	7	1
(United States) M Shaughnessy	7	6
(Madagascar) D Randriantefy	5	3
13	(Serbia and Montenegro) J Janković	2	6	7
(Italy) F Pennetta	6	4	6^{1}
WC	(Germany) J Schruff	6	1	6
3	(Russia) A Myskina	2	6	4

Third round
8	(Russia) E Bovina	6	6
(United States) M Shaughnessy	4	2
13	(Serbia and Montenegro) J Janković	6	6
WC	(Germany) J Schruff	3	2

Quarterfinals
8	(Russia) E Bovina	3	6	3
13	(Serbia and Montenegro) J Janković	6	3	6

==== Section 4 ====
First round
(Spain) M Marrero	4	1
(Czech Republic) K Koukalová	6	6
(Russia) A Chakvetadze	4	3
(France) M Pierce	6	6
WC	(Germany) S Klösel	5	6^{0}
10	(Russia) E Likhovtseva	7	7
16	(Croatia) K Šprem	6	1	2
(France) V Razzano	4	6	6
(United States) J Craybas	4	6	6
Q	(Germany) S Gehrlein	6	3	4
(Israel) A Smashnova	6	6
(Croatia) J Kostanić	3	2

Second round
6	(Russia) N Petrova	7	6
(Czech Republic) K Koukalová	5	4
(France) M Pierce	6	6
10	(Russia) E Likhovtseva	2	2
(France) V Razzano	7	3	7
(United States) J Craybas	6^{8}	6	5
(Israel) A Smashnova	4	1
2	(France) A Mauresmo	6	6

Third round
6	(Russia) N Petrova	6	7
(France) M Pierce	2	5
(France) V Razzano	4	2
2	(France) A Mauresmo	6	6

Quarterfinals
6	(Russia) N Petrova	6	6
2	(France) A Mauresmo	2	3
