= 2007 Kremlin Cup – Women's singles =

Women's singles
- 2007 Kremlin Cup

Final
- Champion: (Russia) Elena Dementieva
- Runner-up: (United States) Serena Williams
- Score: 5–7, 6–1, 6–1

Details
- Draw: 28
- Seeds: 8

Events
Singles	men	women
Doubles	men	women
- Kremlin Cup

Elena Dementieva defeated Serena Williams in the final, 5–7, 6–1, 6–1 to win the women's singles tennis title at the 2007 Kremlin Cup.

Anna Chakvetadze was the defending champion, but lost in the second round to Dinara Safina.

== Seeds ==
The top four seeds received a bye into the second round.

1. (Russia) Svetlana Kuznetsova (semifinals)
2. (Russia) Maria Sharapova (second round)
3. (Russia) Anna Chakvetadze (second round)
4. (United States) Serena Williams (final)
5. (France) Marion Bartoli (second round)
6. (France) Amélie Mauresmo (first round)
7. (Switzerland) Patty Schnyder (second round)
8. (Czech Republic) Nicole Vaidišová (quarterfinals)

== Draw ==
Key

- Q = Qualifier
- WC = Wild card
- LL = Lucky loser
- Alt = Alternate
- ITF = ITF entry
- PR = Protected ranking
- SR = Special ranking
- SE = Special exempt
- JE = Junior exempt
- JR = Junior Accelerator Programme entrant
- CO = College Accelerator Programme entrant
- NG = Next Gen Accelerator Program entrant
- w/o = Walkover
- r = Retired
- d = Defaulted

=== Finals ===
Semifinals
1	(Russia) Svetlana Kuznetsova	6^{2}	1
4	(United States) Serena Williams	7^{7}	6
(Russia) Dinara Safina	1	0
(Russia) Elena Dementieva	6	6

Final
4	(United States) Serena Williams	7	1	1
(Russia) Elena Dementieva	5	6	6

=== Top half ===
First round
(Argentina) G Dulko	6	6
(India) S Mirza	3	4
(Greece) E Daniilidou	5	1
WC	(Russia) V Dushevina	7	6
(Ukraine) A Bondarenko	2	5
5	(France) M Bartoli	6	7
Q	(Ukraine) T Perebiynis	6	1	7
(Netherlands) M Krajicek	4	6	5
Q	(Switzerland) E Gagliardi	2	4
WC	(Russia) E Vesnina	6	6
Q	(Russia) Y Shvedova	6^{3}	3
8	(Czech Republic) N Vaidišová	7^{7}	6

Second round
1	(Russia) S Kuznetsova	3	6	6
(Argentina) G Dulko	6	2	4
WC	(Russia) V Dushevina	2	6	6
5	(France) M Bartoli	6	0	4
4	(United States) S Williams	7	6
Q	(Ukraine) T Perebiynis	5	4
WC	(Russia) E Vesnina	3	4
8	(Czech Republic) N Vaidišová	6	6

Quarterfinals
1	(Russia) S Kuznetsova	6	6
WC	(Russia) V Dushevina	2	2
4	(United States) S Williams	6	7^{9}
8	(Czech Republic) N Vaidišová	4	6^{7}

Semifinals
1	(Russia) S Kuznetsova	6^{2}	1
4	(United States) S Williams	7^{7}	6

=== Bottom half ===
First round
6	(France) A Mauresmo	6	3	4
(Russia) V Zvonareva	4	6	6
(Russia) M Kirilenko	4	6	1
(Poland) A Radwańska	6	4	6
(Germany) M Müller	1	3
(Russia) D Safina	6	6
7	(Switzerland) P Schnyder	6	6
(France) É Loit	4	1
Q	(Australia) A Molik	2	6	3
(Russia) E Dementieva	6	4	6
(Belarus) V Azarenka	6	6
(Austria) S Bammer	3	4

Second round
(Russia) V Zvonareva	6	6
(Poland) A Radwańska	2	2
(Russia) D Safina	7^{8}	6
3	(Russia) A Chakvetadze	6^{6}	2
7	(Switzerland) P Schnyder	3	4
(Russia) E Dementieva	6	6
(Belarus) V Azarenka	7^{11}	6
2/WC	(Russia) M Sharapova	6^{9}	2

Quarterfinals
(Russia) V Zvonareva	2	6	3
(Russia) D Safina	6	3	6
(Russia) E Dementieva	7^{7}	6
(Belarus) V Azarenka	6^{4}	2

Semifinals
(Russia) D Safina	1	0
(Russia) E Dementieva	6	6
