= 2003 Croatian Bol Ladies Open – Doubles =

Doubles
- 2003 Croatian Bol Ladies Open

Final
- Champions: (Hungary) Petra Mandula (Austria) Patricia Wartusch
- Runners-up: (Switzerland) Emmanuelle Gagliardi (Switzerland) Patty Schnyder
- Score: 6–3, 6–2

Details
- Draw: 16 (1WC/1Q)
- Seeds: 4

Events
Singles	Doubles
- Croatian Bol Ladies Open

Tathiana Garbin and Angelique Widjaja were the defending champions, but Widjaja did not compete this year. Garbin teamed up with Caroline Schneider and lost in quarterfinals to tournament winners Petra Mandula and Patricia Wartusch.

Petra Mandula and Patricia Wartusch won the title by defeating Emmanuelle Gagliardi and Patty Schnyder 6–3, 6–2 in the final.

== Seeds ==
1. (Hungary) Petra Mandula / (Austria) Patricia Wartusch (champions)
2. (Switzerland) Emmanuelle Gagliardi / (Switzerland) Patty Schnyder (final)
3. (Australia) Nicole Pratt / (Germany) Barbara Rittner (semifinals)
4. (Australia) Trudi Musgrave / (United States) Samantha Reeves (first round)

== Draw ==
Key

- Q = Qualifier
- WC = Wild card
- LL = Lucky loser
- Alt = Alternate
- ITF = ITF entry
- PR = Protected ranking
- SR = Special ranking
- SE = Special exempt
- JE = Junior exempt
- JR = Junior Accelerator Programme entrant
- CO = College Accelerator Programme entrant
- NG = Next Gen Accelerator Program entrant
- w/o = Walkover
- r = Retired
- d = Defaulted

=== Draw ===
First round
1	(Hungary) P Mandula (Austria) P Wartusch	6	6
(Belarus) T Poutchek (Russia) A Rodionova	1	2
(Italy) T Garbin (Germany) C Schneider	6	6
(Czech Republic) O Blahotová (Czech Republic) G Navrátilová	1	4
4	(Australia) T Musgrave (United States) S Reeves	2	6	0
(Russia) M Kondratieva (Russia) E Kozhokina	6	3	6
(Italy) R Grande (South Africa) K Grant	1	5
(Russia) G Fattakhetdinova (Croatia) S Talaja	6	7
(Czech Republic) E Birnerová (Sweden) H Ejeson	1	1
(Croatia) I Abramović (Czech Republic) Z Hejdová	6	6
WC	(Croatia) D Jurak (Croatia) K Šprem	0	3
3	(Australia) N Pratt (Germany) B Rittner	6	6
(South Africa) S De Beer (Germany) K Freye	4	3
Q	(Russia) M Kirilenko (Russia) V Zvonareva	6	6
(Spain) G León García (Spain) C Martínez Granados	1	3
2	(Switzerland) E Gagliardi (Switzerland) P Schnyder	6	6

Quarterfinals
1	(Hungary) P Mandula (Austria) P Wartusch	6	6
(Italy) T Garbin (Germany) C Schneider	2	3
(Russia) M Kondratieva (Russia) E Kozhokina	6	3	0
(Russia) G Fattakhetdinova (Croatia) S Talaja	4	6	6
(Croatia) I Abramović (Czech Republic) Z Hejdová	7^{11}	1	2
3	(Australia) N Pratt (Germany) B Rittner	6^{9}	6	6
Q	(Russia) M Kirilenko (Russia) V Zvonareva	5	6	3
2	(Switzerland) E Gagliardi (Switzerland) P Schnyder	7	3	6

Semifinals
1	(Hungary) P Mandula (Austria) P Wartusch	6	6
(Russia) G Fattakhetdinova (Croatia) S Talaja	3	3
3	(Australia) N Pratt (Germany) B Rittner	1	6^{3}
2	(Switzerland) E Gagliardi (Switzerland) P Schnyder	6	7^{7}

Final
1	(Hungary) P Mandula (Austria) P Wartusch	6	6
2	(Switzerland) E Gagliardi (Switzerland) P Schnyder	3	2
