= 2008 Kremlin Cup – Women's singles =

Women's singles
- 2008 Kremlin Cup

Final
- Champion: (Serbia) Jelena Janković
- Runner-up: (Russia) Vera Zvonareva
- Score: 6–2, 6–4

Details
- Draw: 28
- Seeds: 8

Events
Singles	men	women
Doubles	men	women
- Kremlin Cup

Jelena Janković defeated Vera Zvonareva in the final, 6–2, 6–4 to win the women's singles tennis title at the 2008 Kremlin Cup.

Elena Dementieva was the defending champion, but lost in the semifinals to Janković.

== Seeds ==
The top four seeds received a bye into the second round.

1. (Serbia) Jelena Janković (champion)
2. (Russia) Dinara Safina (semifinals)
3. (Russia) Elena Dementieva (semifinals)
4. (Serbia) Ana Ivanovic (second round)
5. (Russia) Svetlana Kuznetsova (quarterfinals)
6. (United States) Venus Williams (first round)
7. (Russia) Vera Zvonareva (final)
8. (Russia) Anna Chakvetadze (first round)

== Draw ==
Key

- Q = Qualifier
- WC = Wild card
- LL = Lucky loser
- Alt = Alternate
- ITF = ITF entry
- PR = Protected ranking
- SR = Special ranking
- SE = Special exempt
- JE = Junior exempt
- JR = Junior Accelerator Programme entrant
- CO = College Accelerator Programme entrant
- NG = Next Gen Accelerator Program entrant
- w/o = Walkover
- r = Retired
- d = Defaulted

=== Finals ===
Semifinals
1	(Serbia) Jelena Janković	0	6	6
3	(Russia) Elena Dementieva	6	1	0
7	(Russia) Vera Zvonareva	6	7^{7}
2	(Russia) Dinara Safina	2	6^{5}

Final
1	(Serbia) Jelena Janković	6	6
7	(Russia) Vera Zvonareva	2	4

=== Top half ===
First round
WC	(Russia) V Dushevina	6	3	6
(Czech Republic) N Vaidišová	1	6	3
WC	(Russia) E Makarova	7^{7}	7^{7}
WC	(Russia) E Vesnina	6^{4}	6^{1}
(Italy) F Pennetta	6	2	6
6	(United States) V Williams	4	6	4
(Ukraine) A Bondarenko	2	1
Q	(Slovenia) K Srebotnik	6	6
(Russia) N Petrova	6	6
Q	(Russia) A Lapushchenkova	2	1
(Denmark) C Wozniacki	2	6	6
8	(Russia) A Chakvetadze	6	1	4

Second round
1	(Serbia) J Janković	6^{6}	6	6
WC	(Russia) V Dushevina	7^{8}	3	2
WC	(Russia) E Makarova	6	4	4
(Italy) F Pennetta	3	6	6
3	(Russia) E Dementieva	6	4	7^{7}
Q	(Slovenia) K Srebotnik	3	6	6^{2}
(Russia) N Petrova	6	3
(Denmark) C Wozniacki	4	2^{r}

Quarterfinals
1	(Serbia) J Janković	7^{8}	6
(Italy) F Pennetta	6^{6}	3
3	(Russia) E Dementieva	6	4	7^{8}
(Russia) N Petrova	4	6	6^{6}

Semifinals
1	(Serbia) J Janković	0	6	6
3	(Russia) E Dementieva	6	1	0

=== Bottom half ===
First round
7	(Russia) V Zvonareva	6	6
(Russia) M Kirilenko	4	4
Q	(Italy) F Schiavone	3	2
(Slovakia) D Hantuchová	6	6
(Slovakia) D Cibulková	6	4
(France) M Bartoli	1	1^{r}
5	(Russia) S Kuznetsova	6	7
(China) N Li	4	5
Q	(Italy) S Errani	1	6	6
(Belarus) V Azarenka	6	4	3
(France) A Mauresmo	6^{3}	6	6
(France) A Cornet	7^{7}	3	4

Second round
7	(Russia) V Zvonareva	6	6
(Slovakia) D Hantuchová	1	0
(Slovakia) D Cibulková	3	6	7^{7}
4	(Serbia) A Ivanovic	6	2	6^{4}
5	(Russia) S Kuznetsova	7^{7}	6
Q	(Italy) S Errani	6^{0}	1
(France) A Mauresmo	7^{7}	4	4
2	(Russia) D Safina	6^{2}	6	6

Quarterfinals
7	(Russia) V Zvonareva	7	6
(Slovakia) D Cibulková	5	4
5	(Russia) S Kuznetsova	4	5
2	(Russia) D Safina	6	7

Semifinals
7	(Russia) V Zvonareva	6	7^{7}
2	(Russia) D Safina	2	6^{5}
