= 2003 Croatian Bol Ladies Open – Singles =

Singles
- 2003 Croatian Bol Ladies Open

Final
- Champion: (Russia) Vera Zvonareva
- Runner-up: (Spain) Conchita Martínez Granados
- Score: 6–1, 6–3

Details
- Draw: 30 (4WC/2Q/1LL)
- Seeds: 8

Events
Singles	Doubles
← 2002 ·	Croatian Bol Ladies Open	· 2016 →

Åsa Svensson was the defending champion, but did not compete this year.

Vera Zvonareva won the title by defeating Conchita Martínez Granados 6–1, 6–3 in the final.

== Seeds ==
The first two seeds received a bye into the second round.

1. (Switzerland) Patty Schnyder (second round)
2. (Italy) Silvia Farina Elia (second round)
3. (Russia) Vera Zvonareva (champion)
4. (Australia) Nicole Pratt (first round)
5. (Italy) Rita Grande (first round)
6. (Slovakia) Henrieta Nagyová (second round)
7. (Italy) Flavia Pennetta (first round)
8. (Hungary) Petra Mandula (first round)

== Draw ==
=== Key ===
- Q = Qualifier
- WC = Wild card
- LL = Lucky loser
- Alt = Alternate
- SE = Special exempt
- PR = Protected ranking
- ITF = ITF entry
- JE = Junior exempt
- w/o = Walkover
- r = Retired
- d = Defaulted
- SR = Special ranking

=== Finals ===
Semifinals
(United States) Samantha Reeves	3	4
3	(Russia) Vera Zvonareva	6	6
(Spain) Conchita Martínez Granados	6	1	6
(Spain) María Sánchez Lorenzo	0	6	4

Final
3	(Russia) Vera Zvonareva	6	6
(Spain) Conchita Martínez Granados	1	3

=== Top half ===
First round
(United States) M Tu	1	3
Q	(Spain) G León García	6	6
(United States) S Reeves	7^{7}	6
WC	(Croatia) K Šprem	6^{4}	3
(Austria) P Wartusch	6	7^{7}
7	(Italy) F Pennetta	4	6^{4}
3	(Russia) V Zvonareva	6	6
Q	(Croatia) Petra Dizdar	0	3
Q	(Germany) AL Grönefeld	6	6
(Czech Republic) E Birnerová	2	1
LL	(Czech Republic) O Blahotová	4	6	3
(Germany) A Rösch	6	3	6
(Slovakia) Ľ Cervanová	7	6
8	(Hungary) P Mandula	5	1

Second round
1	(Switzerland) P Schnyder	6^{4}	4
Q	(Spain) G León García	7^{7}	6
(United States) S Reeves	6	4	6
(Austria) P Wartusch	1	6	3
3	(Russia) V Zvonareva	2	6	7^{10}
Q	(Germany) AL Grönefeld	6	3	6^{8}
(Germany) A Rösch	7^{7}	3	1
(Slovakia) Ľ Cervanová	6^{2}	6	6

Quarterfinals
Q	(Spain) G León García	6^{3}	0^{r}
(United States) S Reeves	7^{7}	3
3	(Russia) V Zvonareva	6	6
(Slovakia) Ľ Cervanová	1	1

Semifinals
(United States) S Reeves	3	4
3	(Russia) V Zvonareva	6	6

=== Bottom half ===
First round
5	(Italy) R Grande	2	6	2
(Italy) T Garbin	6	4	6
(Spain) C Torrens Valero	3	1
(Switzerland) E Gagliardi	6	6
(Croatia) J Kostanić	6	5	3
(Belarus) T Poutchek	1	7	6
(Spain) C Martínez Granados	6	6
4	(Australia) N Pratt	4	3
6	(Slovakia) H Nagyová	6	6
WC	(Croatia) D Jurak	3	2
Q	(Germany) J Schruff	3	4
(Spain) M Sánchez Lorenzo	6	6
(Croatia) S Talaja	6	6
(Germany) B Rittner	1	1

Second round
(Italy) T Garbin	5	6	7
(Switzerland) E Gagliardi	7	4	5
(Belarus) T Poutchek	1	4
(Spain) C Martínez Granados	6	6
6	(Slovakia) H Nagyová	6	0	4
(Spain) M Sánchez Lorenzo	2	6	6
(Croatia) S Talaja	1	6	6
2	(Italy) S Farina Elia	6	3	2

Quarterfinals
(Italy) T Garbin	5	6^{4}
(Spain) C Martínez Granados	7	7^{7}
(Spain) M Sánchez Lorenzo	7	7^{8}
(Croatia) S Talaja	5	6^{6}

Semifinals
(Spain) C Martínez Granados	6	1	6
(Spain) M Sánchez Lorenzo	0	6	4
