= 2004 Acura Classic =

- Date: July 25 – August 1
- Edition: 26th
- Category: Tier I
- Draw: 56S / 24D
- Prize money: USD 1,300,000
- Surface: Hard / outdoor
- Location: San Diego, California, U.S.
- Venue: La Costa Resort and Spa

Champions

Singles
- (United States) Lindsay Davenport

Doubles
- (Zimbabwe) Cara Black / (Australia) Rennae Stubbs
- Southern California Open

The 2004 Acura Classic was a tennis tournament played on outdoor hard courts at the La Costa Resort and Spa in San Diego, California, United States. It was part of Tier I of the 2004 WTA Tour. It was the 26th edition of the tournament was held from July 25 through August 1, 2004. Fourth-seeded Lindsay Davenport won the singles title and earned $189,000 first-prize money.

== Finals ==
=== Singles ===
(United States) Lindsay Davenport defeated (Russia) Anastasia Myskina 6–1, 6–1

- It was Davenport's 5th title of the year and the 78th of her career.

=== Doubles ===
(Zimbabwe) Cara Black / (Australia) Rennae Stubbs defeated (Spain) Virginia Ruano Pascual / (Argentina) Paola Suárez 4–6, 6–1, 6–4

- It was Black's 5th title of the year and the 34th of her career. It was Stubbs's 4th title of the year and the 46th of her career.
