= 2005 Qatar Total German Open – Doubles =

Doubles
- 2005 Qatar Total German Open

Final
- Champions: (Russia) Elena Likhovtseva (Russia) Vera Zvonareva
- Runners-up: (Zimbabwe) Cara Black (South Africa) Liezel Huber
- Score: 4–6, 6–4, 6–3

Details
- Draw: 28
- Seeds: 8

Events
Singles	Doubles
- WTA German Open

The doubles Tournament at the 2005 Qatar Total German Open took place between 2 May and 8 May 2005 on the outdoor clay courts of the Rot-Weiss Tennis Club in Berlin, Germany. Elena Likhovtseva and Vera Zvonareva won the title, defeating Cara Black and Liezel Huber in the final.

== Seeds ==
1. (Russia) Nadia Petrova / (United States) Meghann Shaughnessy (quarterfinals)
2. (Zimbabwe) Cara Black / (South Africa) Liezel Huber (final)
3. (Russia) Elena Likhovtseva / (Russia) Vera Zvonareva (champions)
4. (Slovakia) Janette Husárová / (Spain) Conchita Martínez (quarterfinals)
5. (Slovakia) Daniela Hantuchová / (Japan) Ai Sugiyama (semifinals)
6. (Spain) Anabel Medina Garrigues / (Russia) Dinara Safina (second round)
7. (Argentina) Gisela Dulko / (Venezuela) María Vento-Kabchi (semifinals)
8. (Czech Republic) Iveta Benešová / (Slovenia) Tina Križan (first round)

== Draw ==
Key

- Q = Qualifier
- WC = Wild card
- LL = Lucky loser
- Alt = Alternate
- ITF = ITF entry
- PR = Protected ranking
- SR = Special ranking
- SE = Special exempt
- JE = Junior exempt
- JR = Junior Accelerator Programme entrant
- CO = College Accelerator Programme entrant
- NG = Next Gen Accelerator Program entrant
- w/o = Walkover
- r = Retired
- d = Defaulted

=== Finals ===
Semifinals
7	(Argentina) Gisela Dulko (Venezuela) María Vento-Kabchi	5	6	2
3	(Russia) Elena Likhovtseva (Russia) Vera Zvonareva	7	3	6
5	(Slovakia) Daniela Hantuchová (Japan) Ai Sugiyama	2	3
2	(Zimbabwe) Cara Black (South Africa) Liezel Huber	6	6

Final
3	(Russia) Elena Likhovtseva (Russia) Vera Zvonareva	4	6	6
2	(Zimbabwe) Cara Black (South Africa) Liezel Huber	6	4	3

=== Top half ===
First round
(Russia) E Bovina (France) N Dechy	6	6
WC	(Germany) V Henke (Germany) S Klösel	2	3
Q	(Germany) A Kerber (Germany) T Malek	1	3
(Spain) M Marrero (Croatia) S Talaja	6	6
(Czech Republic) D Chládková (Czech Republic) G Navrátilová	4	4
7	(Argentina) G Dulko (Venezuela) M Vento-Kabchi	6	6
WC	(Germany) S Klaschka (Germany) A Roesch	2	1
(Germany) M Müller (Germany) J Wöhr	6	6
(Russia) M Kirilenko (Australia) L McShea	2	2
(Croatia) J Kostanić (China) S Peng	6	6
(Belgium) E Callens (United States) M Tu	1	3
6	(Spain) A Medina Garrigues (Russia) D Safina	6	6

Second round
1	(Russia) N Petrova (United States) M Shaughnessy	6	7
(Russia) E Bovina (France) N Dechy	2	5
(Spain) M Marrero (Croatia) S Talaja	6	1	2
7	(Argentina) G Dulko (Venezuela) M Vento-Kabchi	2	6	6
3	(Russia) E Likhovtseva (Russia) V Zvonareva	6	6
(Germany) M Müller (Germany) J Wöhr	1	2
(Croatia) J Kostanić (China) S Peng	6	7
6	(Spain) A Medina Garrigues (Russia) D Safina	1	5

Quarterfinals
1	(Russia) N Petrova (United States) M Shaughnessy	6^{2}	1
7	(Argentina) G Dulko (Venezuela) M Vento-Kabchi	7	6
3	(Russia) E Likhovtseva (Russia) V Zvonareva	6	6
(Croatia) J Kostanić (China) S Peng	1	2

Semifinals
7	(Argentina) G Dulko (Venezuela) M Vento-Kabchi	5	6	2
3	(Russia) E Likhovtseva (Russia) V Zvonareva	7	3	6

=== Bottom half ===
First round
5	(Slovakia) D Hantuchová (Japan) A Sugiyama	7	6
(Germany) B Rittner (Czech Republic) K Peschke	5	3
(Greece) E Daniilidou (Tunisia) S Sfar	2	7	2
(Russia) A Jidkova (Ukraine) T Perebiynis	6	5	6
(Ukraine) Y Fedak (United States) L Osterloh	6	2	1
(Serbia and Montenegro) A Ivanovic (United States) A Myskina	4	6	6
8	(Czech Republic) I Benešová (Slovenia) T Križan	2	5
(United States) J Craybas (United States) J Russell	6	7
(Latvia) L Dekmeijere (Japan) N Miyagi	3	5
(Romania) R Dragomir-Ilie (Switzerland) P Schnyder	6	7
(Germany) AL Grönefeld (Germany) J Schruff	2	2
(Italy) F Pennetta (France) M Pierce	6	6

Second round
5	(Slovakia) D Hantuchová (Japan) A Sugiyama	7	6
(Russia) A Jidkova (Ukraine) T Perebiynis	5	2
(Serbia and Montenegro) A Ivanovic (United States) A Myskina	4	0
4	(Slovakia) J Husárová (Spain) C Martínez	6	6
(United States) J Craybas (United States) J Russell	5	4
(Romania) R Dragomir-Ilie (Switzerland) P Schnyder	7	6
(Italy) F Pennetta (France) M Pierce	3	2
2	(Zimbabwe) C Black (South Africa) L Huber	6	6

Quarterfinals
5	(Slovakia) D Hantuchová (Japan) A Sugiyama	6	6
4	(Slovakia) J Husárová (Spain) C Martínez	1	4
(Romania) R Dragomir-Ilie (Switzerland) P Schnyder	6	5	1
2	(Zimbabwe) C Black (South Africa) L Huber	2	7	6

Semifinals
5	(Slovakia) D Hantuchová (Japan) A Sugiyama	2	3
2	(Zimbabwe) C Black (South Africa) L Huber	6	6
