= 2004 Acura Classic – Doubles =

Doubles
- 2004 Acura Classic

Final
- Champions: (Zimbabwe) Cara Black (Australia) Rennae Stubbs
- Runners-up: (Spain) Virginia Ruano Pascual (Argentina) Paola Suárez
- Score: 4–6, 6–1, 6–4

Details
- Draw: 24
- Seeds: 8

Events
Singles	Doubles
- San Diego Open

At the 2004 Acura Classic doubles tennis competition, Kim Clijsters and Ai Sugiyama were the defending champions, but Clijsters chose not to participate, and only Sugiyama competed that year. Sugiyama partnered with Shinobu Asagoe, but lost in the first round to Amélie Mauresmo and Mary Pierce.

Cara Black and Rennae Stubbs won in the final 4–6, 6–1, 6–4, against Virginia Ruano Pascual and Paola Suárez.

== Seeds ==
All eight seeded pairs received a bye to the second round. Text in italics indicates the round those seeds were eliminated, while champion seeds are indicated in bold.

1. (Spain) Virginia Ruano Pascual / (Argentina) Paola Suárez (final)
2. (Zimbabwe) **Cara Black / (Australia) Rennae Stubbs (champions)**
3. (Russia) Nadia Petrova / (United States) Meghann Shaughnessy (second round)
4. (United States) Martina Navratilova / (United States) Lisa Raymond (semifinals)
5. (Russia) Elena Likhovtseva / (Russia) Vera Zvonareva (semifinals)
6. (France) Émilie Loit / (Australia) Nicole Pratt (second round)
7. (Thailand) Tamarine Tanasugarn / (Venezuela) María Vento-Kabchi (second round)
8. (Greece) Eleni Daniilidou / (South Africa) Liezel Huber (quarterfinals)

== Draw ==
Key

- Q = Qualifier
- WC = Wild card
- LL = Lucky loser
- Alt = Alternate
- ITF = ITF entry
- PR = Protected ranking
- SR = Special ranking
- SE = Special exempt
- JE = Junior exempt
- JR = Junior Accelerator Programme entrant
- CO = College Accelerator Programme entrant
- NG = Next Gen Accelerator Program entrant
- w/o = Walkover
- r = Retired
- d = Defaulted

=== Finals ===
Semifinals
1	(Spain) **Virginia Ruano Pascual** (Argentina) **Paola Suárez**	2	**6**	**7**
5	(Russia) Elena Likhovtseva (Russia) Vera Zvonareva	**6**	4	6^{6}
4	(United States) Martina Navratilova (United States) Lisa Raymond	5	6^{4}
2	(Zimbabwe) **Cara Black** (Australia) **Rennae Stubbs**	**7**	**7**

Final
1	(Spain) Virginia Ruano Pascual (Argentina) Paola Suárez	**6**	4	1
2	(Zimbabwe) **Cara Black** **(Australia) Rennae Stubbs**	4	**6**	**6**

=== Top half ===
First round
WC	(Puerto Rico) K Brandi (Puerto Rico) V Castellvi	0	2
(United States) **A Augustus** **(United States) J Russell**	**6**	**6**
(United States) **J Craybas** **(Spain) M Marrero**	**6**	**6**
WC	(United States) A Bradshaw (United States) L Nelson	2	3
(Russia) E Bovina (France) N Dechy	**6**	3	3
(Russia) **E Dementieva** **(Russia) A Myskina**	2	**6**	**6**
(Italy) S Farina Elia (Italy) F Schiavone	**6**	1	1
(United States) **A Frazier** **(United States) C Martínez**	3	**6**	**6**

Second round
1	(Spain) **V Ruano Pascual** **(Argentina) P Suárez**	**6**	**6**
(United States) A Augustus (United States) J Russell	0	3
(United States) **J Craybas** **(Spain) M Marrero**	**6**	6^{1}	**7**
7	(Thailand) T Tanasugarn (Venezuela) M Vento-Kabchi	3	**7**	5
3	(Russia) N Petrova (United States) M Shaughnessy
(Russia) **Elena Dementieva** **(Russia) A Myskina**	w/o
(United States) Amy Frazier (United States) C Martínez	3	3
5	(Russia) **E Likhovtseva** **(Russia) Vera Zvonareva**	**6**	**6**

Quarterfinals
1	(Spain) **V Ruano Pascual** **(Argentina) P Suárez**	**6**	**6**
(Canada) J Craybas (Spain) M Marrero	2	2
(Russia) E Dementieva (Russia) A Myskina	5	**6**	3
5	(Russia) **E Likhovtseva** **(Russia) V Zvonareva**	**7**	4	**6**

Semifinals
1	(Spain) **V Ruano Pascual** **(Argentina) P Suárez**	2	**6**	**7**
5	(Russia) E Likhovtseva (Russia) V Zvonareva	**6**	4	6^{6}

=== Bottom half ===
First round
WC	(France) **A Mauresmo** **(France) M Pierce**	**6**	**6**
(Japan) S Asagoe (Japan) A Sugiyama	3	3
(Spain) A Parra Santonja (Czech Republic) B Strýcová	2	6^{5}
(Argentina) **G Dulko** **(Argentina) Patricia Tarabini**	**6**	**7**
Q	(Germany) Adriana Barna (Germany) Anca Barna	1	1
(Hungary) **P Mandula** **(Austria) B Schett**	**6**	**6**
(Czech Republic) I Benešová (Luxembourg) C Schaul	3	1
(France) **M Bartoli** **(Slovakia) Daniela Hantuchová**	**6**	**6**

Second round
8	(Greece) **E Daniilidou** **(South Africa) L Huber**	**7**	6^{2}	**6**
WC	(France) A Mauresmo (France) M Pierce	6^{5}	**7**	1
(Argentina) G Dulko (Argentina) Patricia Tarabini	3	4
4	(United States) **M Navratilova** **(United States) L Raymond**	**6**	**6**
6	(France) É Loit (Australia) N Pratt	6^{4}	1
(Hungary) **P Mandula** **(Austria) B Schett**	**7**	**6**
(France) M Bartoli (Slovakia) D Hantuchová	4	6^{2}
5	(Zimbabwe) **C Black** **(Australia) R Stubbs**	**6**	**7**

Quarterfinals
8	(Greece) E Daniilidou (South Africa) L Huber	4	**7**	4
4	(United States) **M Navratilova** **(United States) L Raymond**	**6**	6^{5}	**6**
(Hungary) P Mandula (Austria) B Schett	5	0
2	(Zimbabwe) **C Black** **(Australia) R Stubbs**	**7**	**6**

Semifinals
4	(United States) M Navratilova (United States) L Raymond	5	6^{4}
2	(Zimbabwe) **C Black** **(Australia) R Stubbs**	**7**	**7**
