= Nadia Petrova career statistics =

Career finals
Discipline	Type	Won	Lost	Total
Singles	Grand Slam	–	–	–
Singles	Summer Olympics	–	–	–
Singles	WTA Finals (Note: Formerly known as: Virginia Slims Championships (until 1995); WTA Tour Championships (until 2014))	1	–	1
Singles	WTA Elite (Note: Elite tier: WTA Tournament of Champions (2009–14); WTA Elite Trophy (2015–present))	–	–	–
Singles	WTA 1000 (Note: Formerly known as: Category 4 & 5 & 6 (until 1990); Tier I (until 2009); WTA Premier Mandatory and 5 (until 2021))	3	2	5
Singles	WTA 500 (Note: Formerly known as: Category 3 (until 1990); Tier II (until 2009); WTA Premier (until 2021))	5	7	12
Singles	WTA 250 (Note: Formerly known as: Category 1 & 2 (until 1990); Tier III & IV & V (until 2009); WTA International (until 2021))	4	2	6
Singles	Total	13	11	24
Doubles	Grand Slam	–	2	2
Doubles	Summer Olympics	–	–	–
Doubles	WTA Finals	2	–	2
Doubles	WTA Elite	–	–	–
Doubles	WTA 1000	9	10	19
Doubles	WTA 500	11	8	19
Doubles	WTA 250	2	4	6
Doubles	Total	24	24	48
Total		37	35	72

This is a list of the main career statistics of Russian professional tennis player Nadia Petrova.

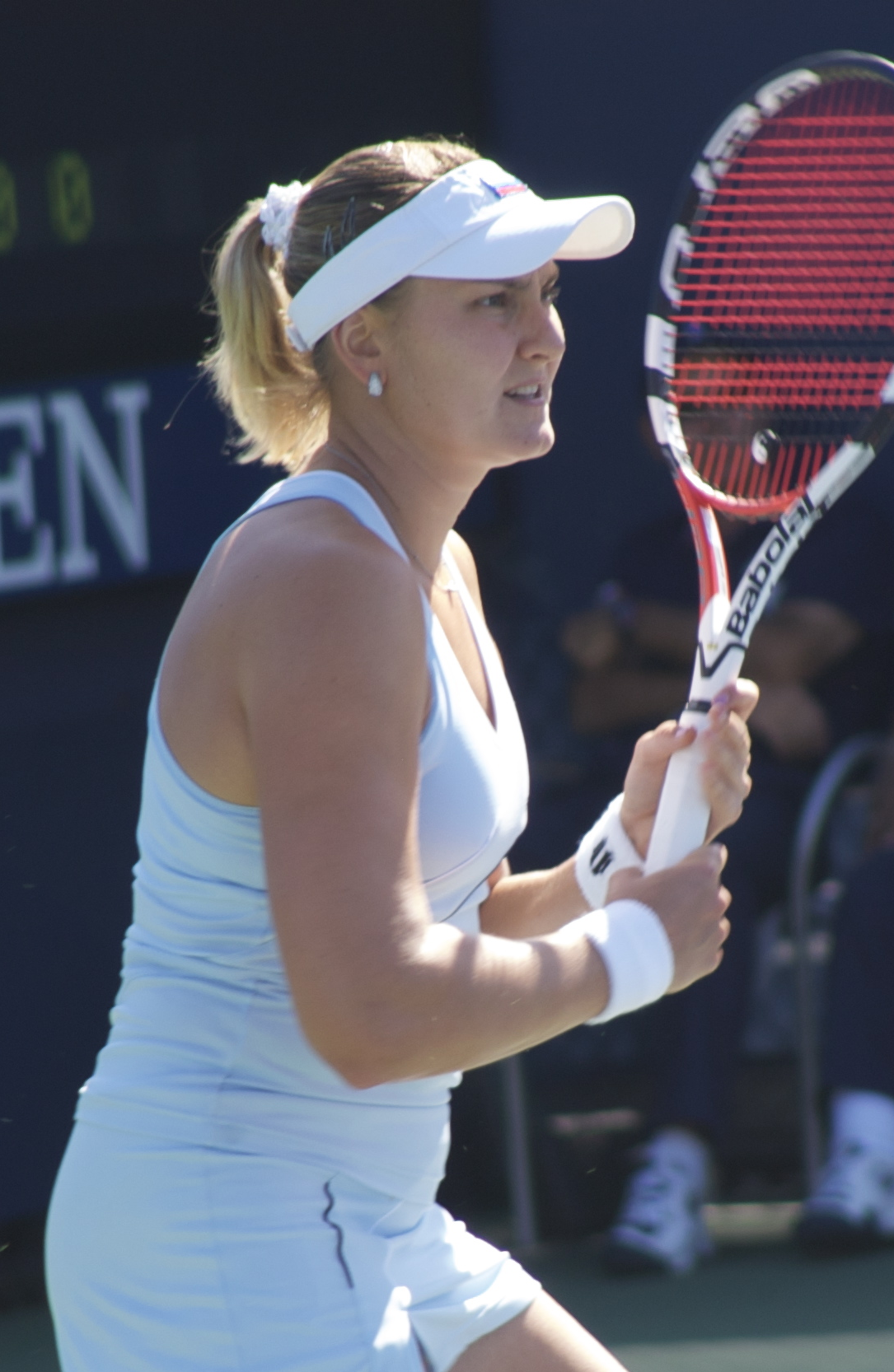
Petrova at the 2008 US Open.

== Performance timelines ==
Key
W	F	SF	QF	#R	RR	Q#	P#	DNQ	A	Z#	PO	G	S	B	NMS	NTI	P	NH

(W) winner; (F) finalist; (SF) semifinalist; (QF) quarterfinalist; (#R) rounds 4, 3, 2, 1; (RR) round-robin stage; (Q#) qualification round; (P#) preliminary round; (DNQ) did not qualify; (A) absent; (Z#) Davis/Fed Cup Zonal Group (with number indication) or (PO) play-off; (G) gold, (S) silver or (B) bronze Olympic/Paralympic medal; (NMS) not a Masters tournament; (NTI) not a Tier I tournament; (P) postponed; (NH) not held; (SR) strike rate (events won / competed); (W–L) win–loss record.

Only main-draw results in WTA Tour, Grand Slam tournaments, Billie Jean King Cup (Fed Cup), Hopman Cup and Olympic Games are included in win–loss records.

=== Singles ===
Tournament	1998	1999	2000	2001	2002	2003	2004	2005	2006	2007	2008	2009	2010	2011	2012	2013	2014	SR	W–L	Win%
Grand Slam tournaments
Australian Open	A	1R	3R	2R	A	3R	1R	4R	QF	3R	4R	4R	QF	3R	2R	1R	A	0 / 14	27–14	66%
French Open	A	Q1	1R	4R	A	SF	3R	SF	1R	1R	3R	2R	QF	1R	3R	1R	A	0 / 13	24–13	65%
Wimbledon	A	2R	2R	4R	A	3R	4R	QF	A	4R	QF	4R	3R	4R	3R	1R	A	0 / 13	31–13	70%
US Open	Q3	Q2	2R	2R	1R	4R	QF	QF	3R	3R	3R	4R	1R	3R	4R	1R	A	0 / 14	27–14	66%
Win-Loss	0–0	1–2	4–4	8–4	0–1	12–4	9–4	16–4	6–3	7–4	11–4	10–4	10–4	7–4	8–4	0–4	0–0	0 / 54	109–54	67%
National representation
Summer Olympics	NH		A	NH			2R	NH			A	NH			3R	NH		0 / 2	3–2	60%
Year-end championships
WTA Finals	DNQ							RR	RR	DNQ	RR	DNQ						0 / 3	2–5	29%
Tournament of Champions	NH											DNQ		3rd	W	DNQ		1 / 2	6–1	86%
WTA 1000 + former^{†} tournaments
Dubai / Qatar Open (Note: The first Premier 5 event of the year has switched back and forth between the Dubai Tennis Championships and the Qatar Ladies Open since 2009. Dubai was classified as a Premier 5 event from 2009 to 2011 before being succeeded by Doha for the 2012–2014 period. In 2015, Dubai regained its Premier 5 status while Doha was demoted to Premier status. The Premier 5 tournaments were reclassified as WTA 1000 tournaments in 2021.)	NMS										1R	A	1R	A	A	3R	1R	0 / 4	2–4	33%
Indian Wells Open	A	A	A	3R	A	Q2	3R	4R	A	4R	A	A	4R	4R	4R	4R	1R	0 / 9	15–9	63%
Miami Open	A	Q3	QF	1R	A	Q2	SF	2R	QF	QF	2R	3R	3R	2R	2R	3R	2R	0 / 13	18–13	58%
Berlin / Madrid Open (Note: In 2009, the German Open was replaced by the Madrid Open. The Premier Mandatory tournaments were reclassified as WTA 1000 tournaments in 2021.)	A	A	A	A	A	2R	3R	F	W	QF	2R	3R	QF	1R	2R	2R	A	1 / 11	21–10	68%
Italian Open	A	Q2	A	3R	A	3R	2R	3R (Note: Withdrew during the tournament. Not counted as a loss.)	A	3R	1R	3R	QF	1R	2R	1R	A	0 / 11	11–10	52%
Canadian Open	A	A	2R	1R	A	3R	2R	QF	2R	QF	3R	1R	2R	2R	1R	A	A	0 / 12	11–12	48%
Cincinnati Open	NH						NMS					1R	1R	QF	1R	A	A	0 / 4	3–4	43%
Pan Pacific / Wuhan Open (Note: In 2014, the Pan Pacific Open was downgraded to a Premier event and replaced by the Wuhan Open. The Premier 5 tournaments were reclassified as WTA 1000 tournaments in 2021.)	A	A	1R	A	A	1R	A	A	A	A	SF	2R	1R	A	W	A	A	1 / 6	10–5	67%
China Open	NH		NMS									SF	3R	1R	2R	A	A	0 / 4	6–3	67%
Charleston Open^{†}	A	Q2	A	1R	A	A	QF	QF	W	A	A	NMS						1 / 4	9–3	75%
Southern California Open^{†}	NMS						1R	2R	2R	QF	NH/NMS							0 / 4	2–4	33%
Kremlin Cup^{†}	2R	2R	A	1R	QF	1R	2R	A	F	A	QF	NMS						0 / 8	10–8	56%
Zurich Open^{†}	A	Q3	A	2R	A	SF	QF	2R	A	A	NH/NMS							0 / 4	7–4	64%
Win-Loss	1–1	1–1	5–3	5–7	1–1	8–6	11–9	12–7	17–4	12–6	8–7	9–7	12–8	6–7	10–7	6–5	1–3	3 / 94	125–89	58%
Career statistics
	1998	1999	2000	2001	2002	2003	2004	2005	2006	2007	2008	2009	2010	2011	2012	2013	2014	SR	W–L	Win%
Tournaments	2	5	15	21	5	20	25	25	23	19	26	21	20	22	22	13	5	Career total: 289		
Titles	0	0	0	0	0	0	0	1	5	1	2	0	0	1	3	0	0	Career total: 13		
Finals	0	0	0	0	0	1	1	3	7	3	4	0	1	1	3	0	0	Career total: 24		
Hard win–loss	1–1	2–3	9–7	8–13	6–5	22–14	29–17	36–16	33–17	27–13	34–18	17–13	17–13	19–14	20–11	7–7	1–4	9 / 195	288–186	61%
Clay win–loss	1–1	0–1	1–5	11–6	0–0	9–4	8–5	15–4	15–2	9–5	5–4	9–6	12–4	3–5	10–6	2–4	0–1	3 / 65	110–63	64%
Grass win–loss	0–0	1–1	2–3	3–3	0–0	5–2	3–3	5–2	0–0	5–2	8–2	4–2	3–2	3–2	9–2	0–2	0–0	1 / 29	51–28	65%
Overall win–loss	2–2	3–5	12–15	22–22	6–5	36–20	40–25	56–22	48–19	41–20	47–24	30–21	32–19	25–21	39–19	9–13	1–5	13 / 289	449–277	62%
Year-end ranking (Note: 1997: WTA ranking–589.)	142	95	62	39	111	12	12	9	6	14	11	20	15	29	12	102	374	$12,466,924		

=== Doubles ===
	1998	1999	2000	2001	2002	2003	2004	2005	2006	2007	2008	2009	2010	2011	2012	2013	2014	SR	W–L	Win%
Grand Slam tournaments
Australian Open	A	A	A	1R	A	QF	3R	A	A	A	2R	1R	1R	SF	3R	3R	A	0 / 9	14–9	61%
French Open	A	A	2R	2R	A	3R	QF	SF	A	A	1R	QF	3R	QF	F	SF	A	0 / 11	28–11	72%
Wimbledon	A	2R	A	3R	A	2R	QF	QF	A	QF	A	3R	3R	QF	2R	QF	A	0 / 11	24–11	69%
US Open	A	A	2R	2R	SF	3R	2R	3R	QF	A	2R	QF	F	SF	QF	QF	A	0 / 13	32–13	71%
Win–loss	0–0	1–1	2–2	4–4	4–1	8–4	9–4	9–3	3–1	3–1	2–3	8–4	9–4	13–4	11–4	12–4	0-0	0 / 44	98–44	69%
National representation
Summer Olympics	NH		A	NH			A	NH			A	NH			SF-B	NH		0 / 1	4–1	80%
Year-end championships
WTA Finals	DNQ						W	DNQ							W	SF	DNQ	2 / 3	4–1	80%
WTA 1000 + former^{†} tournaments
Dubai / Qatar Open	NMS										1R	A	SF	A	A	F	SF	0 / 4	6–4	60%
Indian Wells Open	A	A	A	A	A	SF	QF	F	A	1R	A	A	F	QF	2R	F	A	0 / 8	19–8	70%
Miami Open	A	A	A	A	A	2R	W	QF	1R	2R	A	2R	F	F	W	W	A	3 / 10	27–7	79%
Berlin / Madrid Open	A	A	A	A	A	QF	W	QF	SF	QF	SF	2R	2R	2R	SF	2R	A	1 / 11	13–9	59%
Italian Open	A	Q2	A	A	A	F	W	A	A	2R	1R	QF	SF	QF	QF	SF	A	1 / 9	18–6	75%
Canadian Open	A	A	Q3	QF	A	SF	A	A (Note: Was part of the draw but did not play any match.)	W	QF	2R	1R	2R	1R	F	A	A	1 / 9	16–7	70%
Cincinnati Open	NH/NMS											QF	SF	QF	A	A	A	0 / 3	5–3	63%
Pan Pacific / Wuhan Open	A	A	Q3	A	A	QF	A	A	A	A	W	SF	1R	A	A	A	A	1 / 4	7–3	70%
China Open	NH/NMS											1R	QF	A	SF	A	A	0 / 3	3–2	60%
Charleston Open^{†}	A	A	A	A	A	2R	A	A	SF	A	A	NMS						0 / 2	3–1	75%
San Diego Open^{†}	NMS						A	A	A	2R	NH/NMS							0 / 1	1–1	50%
Kremlin Cup^{†}	1R	1R	A	A	F	W	SF	A	QF	A	W	NMS						2 / 7	14–5	74%
Zurich Open^{†}	A	1R	A	1R	F	1R	QF	A	A	A	NH/NMS							0 / 5	4–5	44%
Win–loss	0–1	0–2	0–0	2–2	6–2	17–8	16–3	7–3	10–3	6–3	9–4	8–6	14–8	10–6	15–5	14–4	2–1	9 / 76	136–61	69%
Career statistics
	1998	1999	2000	2001	2002	2003	2004	2005	2006	2007	2008	2009	2010	2011	2012	2013	2014	SR	W–L	Win%
Tournaments	2	7	9	13	8	21	15	8	9	10	17	18	17	15	18	15	4	Career total: 206		
Titles	0	0	0	2	1	1	7	0	1	0	3	3	1	0	2	3	0	Career total: 24		
Finals	0	0	0	4	3	4	7	1	2	0	4	3	5	2	7	6	0	Career total: 48		
Hard win–loss	0–0	0–1	1–4	10–6	14–4	18–9	20–5	8–4	13–4	5–4	22–10	14–9	20–10	19–8	28–10	26–7	2–2	13 / 117	220–97	69%
Clay win–loss	0–1	3–4	4–4	6–2	0–0	8–4	15–1	5–2	4–2	4–1	0–3	15–4	8–3	7–4	9–4	6–4	0–1	5 / 54	94–44	68%
Grass win–loss	0–0	1–1	0–1	8–2	0–0	4–2	3–1	5–1	0–0	3–1	0–0	3–1	2–2	3–2	7–3	7–1	0–0	2 / 22	46–18	72%
Carpet win–loss	0–1	0–1	0–0	0–1	4–2	9–2	2–1	0–0	1–1	2–0	0–0	0–0	0–0	0–1	0–0	0–0	0–1	4 / 13	18–11	62%
Overall win–loss	0–2	4–7	5–9	24–11	18–6	39–17	40–8	18–7	18–7	14–6	22–13	32–14	30–15	29–15	44–17	39–12	2–4	24 / 206	378–170	69%
Year-end ranking	151	151	140	41	21	13	7	33	23	57	20	16	8	13	5	8	174			

== Grand Slam tournament finals ==
=== Doubles: 2 (2 runner-ups) ===
Result	Year	Championship	Surface	Partner	Opponents	Score
Loss	2010	US Open	Hard	(United States) Liezel Huber	(United States) Vania King (Kazakhstan) Yaroslava Shvedova	6–2, 4–6, 6–7^{(4–7)}
Loss	2012	French Open	Clay	(Russia) Maria Kirilenko	(Italy) Sara Errani (Italy) Roberta Vinci	6–4, 4–6, 2–6

== Other significant finals ==
=== Year-end championships ===
==== Doubles: 2 (2 titles) ====
Result	Year	Tournament	Surface	Partner	Opponents	Score
Win	2004	WTA Championships, Los Angeles	Hard (i)	(United States) Meghann Shaughnessy	(Zimbabwe) Cara Black (Australia) Rennae Stubbs	7–5, 6–2
Win	2012	Tour Championships, Istanbul	Hard (i)	(Russia) Maria Kirilenko	(Czech Republic) Andrea Hlaváčková (Czech Republic) Lucie Hradecká	6–1, 6–4

=== WTA Elite ===
==== Singles: 1 (title) ====
Result	Year	Tournament	Surface	Opponent	Score
Win	2012	WTA Tournament of Champions, Bulgaria	Hard (i)	(Denmark) Caroline Wozniacki	6–2, 6–1

=== WTA 1000 ===
==== Singles: 5 (3 titles, 2 runner-ups) ====
Result	Year	Tournament	Surface	Opponent	Score
Loss	2005	German Open	Clay	(Belgium) Justine Henin	3–6, 6–4, 3–6
Win	2006	Charleston Open	Clay	(Switzerland) Patty Schnyder	6–3, 4–6, 6–1
Win	2006	German Open	Clay	(Belgium) Justine Henin	4–6, 6–4, 7–5
Loss	2006	Kremlin Cup	Carpet (i)	(Russia) Anna Chakvetadze	4–6, 4–6
Win	2012	Pan Pacific Open	Hard	(Poland) Agnieszka Radwańska	6–0, 1–6, 6–3

==== Doubles: 19 (9 titles, 10 runner-ups) ====
Result	Year	Tournament	Surface	Partner	Opponents	Score
Loss	2002	Kremlin Cup	Carpet (i)	(Federal Republic of Yugoslavia) Jelena Dokic	(Russia) Elena Dementieva (Slovakia) Janette Husárová	6–2, 3–6, 6–7^{(7-9)}
Loss	2002	Zürich Open	Hard (i)	(Federal Republic of Yugoslavia) Jelena Dokic	(Russia) Elena Bovina (Belgium) Justine Henin	2–6, 6–7^{(2-7)}
Loss	2003	Italian Open	Clay	(Federal Republic of Yugoslavia) Jelena Dokic	(Russia) Svetlana Kuznetsova (United States) Martina Navratilova	4–6, 7–5, 2–6
Win	2003	Kremlin Cup	Carpet (i)	(United States) Meghann Shaughnessy	(Russia) Anastasia Myskina (Russia) Vera Zvonareva	6–3, 6–4
Win	2004	Miami Open	Hard	(United States) Meghann Shaughnessy	(Russia) Svetlana Kuznetsova (Russia) Elena Likhovtseva	6-2, 6-3
Win	2004	German Open	Clay	(United States) Meghann Shaughnessy	(Slovakia) Janette Husárová (Spain) Conchita Martínez	6–2, 2–6, 6–1
Win	2004	Italian Open	Clay	(United States) Meghann Shaughnessy	(Spain) Virginia Ruano Pascual (Argentina) Paola Suárez	2–6, 6–3, 6–3
Loss	2005	Indian Wells Open	Hard	(United States) Meghann Shaughnessy	(Spain) Virginia Ruano Pascual (Argentina) Paola Suárez	6–7^{(3-7), 1–6}
Win	2006	Canadian Open (Montreal)	Hard	(United States) Martina Navratilova	(Zimbabwe) Cara Black (Germany) Anna-Lena Grönefeld	6-1, 6-2
Win	2008	Pan Pacific Open	Hard	(United States) Vania King	(United States) Lisa Raymond (Australia) Samantha Stosur	6–1, 6–4
Win	2008	Kremlin Cup (2)	Hard	(Slovenia) Katarina Srebotnik	(Zimbabwe) Cara Black (United States) Liezel Huber	6–4, 6–4
Loss	2010	Indian Wells Open	Hard	(Australia) Samantha Stosur	(Czech Republic) Květa Peschke (Slovenia) Katarina Srebotnik	6–4, 2–6, [5–10]
Loss	2010	Miami Open	Hard	(Australia) Samantha Stosur	(Argentina) Gisela Dulko (Italy) Flavia Pennetta	3–6, 6–4, [7–10]
Loss	2011	Miami Open	Hard	(United States) Liezel Huber	(Slovakia) Daniela Hantuchová (Poland) Agnieszka Radwańska	6–7^{(5-7)}, 6–2, [8–10]
Win	2012	Miami Open (2)	Hard	(Russia) Maria Kirilenko	(Italy) Sara Errani (Italy) Roberta Vinci	7–6^{(7–0)}, 4–6, [10–4]
Loss	2012	Canadian Open (Montreal)	Hard	(Slovenia) Katarina Srebotnik	(Poland) Klaudia Jans-Ignacik (France) Kristina Mladenovic	5–7, 6–2, [7–10]
Loss	2013	Qatar Ladies Open	Hard	(Slovenia) Katarina Srebotnik	(Italy) Sara Errani; (Italy) Roberta Vinci	6-2, 3–6, [6-10]
Loss	2013	Indian Wells Open	Hard	(Slovenia) Katarina Srebotnik	(Russia) Ekaterina Makarova; (Russia) Elena Vesnina	0-6, 7–5, [6-10]
Win	2013	Miami Open (3)	Hard	(Slovenia) Katarina Srebotnik	(United States) Lisa Raymond; (United Kingdom) Laura Robson	6-1, 7-6^{(7–2)}

=== Olympic medal matches ===
==== Doubles: 1 (bronze) ====
Result	Year	Tournament	Surface	Partner	Opponents	Score
Bronze	2012	London Olympics	Grass	(Russia) Maria Kirilenko	(United States) Liezel Huber; (United States) Lisa Raymond	4–6, 6–4, 6–1

== WTA Tour finals ==
=== Singles: 24 (13 titles, 11 runner-ups) ===
Legend
Tournament of Champions/Elite (1–0)
WTA 1000 (Tier I) (3–2)
WTA 500 (Tier II / Premier) (5–7)
WTA 250 (Tier III / International) (4–2)

Result	W–L	Date	Tournament	Tier	Surface	Opponent	Score
Loss	0–1	Oct 2003	Linz Open, Austria	Tier II	Hard (i)	(Japan) Ai Sugiyama	5–7, 4–6
Loss	0–2	Jan 2004	Australian Hard Court Championships	Tier III	Hard	(Japan) Ai Sugiyama	6–1, 1–6, 4–6
Loss	0–3	May 2005	German Open	Tier I	Clay	(Belgium) Justine Henin	3–6, 6–4, 3–6
Loss	0–4	Oct 2005	Bangkok Open, Thailand	Tier III	Hard	(Czech Republic) Nicole Vaidišová	1–6, 7–6^{(7–5)}, 5–7
Win	1–4	Oct 2005	Linz Open, Austria	Tier II	Hard (i)	(Switzerland) Patty Schnyder	4–6, 6–3, 6–1
Win	2–4	Mar 2006	Qatar Ladies Open	Tier II	Hard	(France) Amélie Mauresmo	6–3, 7–5
Win	3–4	Apr 2006	Amelia Island Championships, U.S.	Tier II	Clay	(Italy) Francesca Schiavone	6–4, 6–4
Win	4–4	Apr 2006	Charleston Open, U.S.	Tier I	Clay	(Switzerland) Patty Schnyder	6–3, 4–6, 6–1
Win	5–4	May 2006	German Open	Tier I	Clay	(Belgium) Justine Henin	4–6, 6–4, 7–5
Win	6–4	Oct 2006	Stuttgart Open, Germany	Tier II	Hard (i)	(France) Tatiana Golovin	6–3, 7–6^{(7–4)}
Loss	6–5	Oct 2006	Kremlin Cup, Russia	Tier I	Carpet (i)	(Russia) Anna Chakvetadze	4–6, 4–6
Loss	6–6	Oct 2006	Linz Open, Austria	Tier II	Hard (i)	(Russia) Maria Sharapova	5–7, 2–6
Win	7–6	Feb 2007	Open Gaz de France, France	Tier II	Carpet (i)	(Czech Republic) Lucie Šafářová	4–6, 6–1, 6–4
Loss	7–7	Apr 2007	Amelia Island Championships, U.S.	Tier II	Clay	(France) Tatiana Golovin	2–6, 1–6
Loss	7–8	Aug 2007	LA Championships, U.S.	Tier II	Hard	(Serbia) Ana Ivanovic	5–7, 4–6
Loss	7–9	Jun 2008	Eastbourne International, UK	Tier II	Grass	(Poland) Agnieszka Radwańska	4–6, 7–6^{(13–11)}, 4–6
Win	8–9	Aug 2008	Cincinnati Open, U.S.	International	Hard	(France) Nathalie Dechy	6–2, 6–1
Loss	8–10	Oct 2008	Stuttgart Open, Germany	Tier II	Hard	(Serbia) Jelena Janković	4–6, 3–6
Win	9–10	Nov 2008	Tournoi de Québec, Canada	International	Carpet (i)	(United States) Bethanie Mattek	4–6, 6–4, 6–1
Loss	9–11	Aug 2010	Connecticut Open, U.S.	Premier	Hard	(Denmark) Caroline Wozniacki	3–6, 6–3, 3–6
Win	10–11	Jul 2011	Washington Open, U.S.	International	Hard	(Israel) Shahar Pe'er	7–5, 6–2
Win	11–11	Jun 2012	Rosmalen Open, Netherlands	International	Grass	(Poland) Urszula Radwańska	6–4, 6–3
Win	12–11	Sep 2012	Pan Pacific Open, Japan	Tier I	Hard	(Poland) Agnieszka Radwańska	6–0, 1–6, 6–3
Win	13–11	Nov 2012	WTA Tournament of Champions, Sofia	Elite	Hard (i)	(Denmark) Caroline Wozniacki	6–2, 6–1

=== Doubles: 48 (24 titles, 24 runner–ups) ===
Legend
Grand Slam tournaments (0–2)
Finals (2–0)
WTA 1000 (Tier I / Premier 5 / Premier M) (9–10)
WTA 500 (Tier II / Premier) (11–8)
WTA 250 (Tier III / International) (2–4)

Result	W–L	Date	Tournament	Tier	Surface	Partner	Opponents	Score
Loss	0–1	May 2001	Bol Ladies Open, Croatia	Tier III	Clay	(Slovenia) Tina Pisnik	(Spain) Conchita Martínez; (Spain) Anabel Medina Garrigues	7–5, 6–4
Win	1–1	Jun 2001	Rosmalen Open, Netherlands	Tier III	Grass	(Romania) Ruxandra Dragomir	(Belgium) Kim Clijsters; (Netherlands) Miriam Oremans	7–6^{(7–5)}, 6–7^{(5–7)}, 6–4
Loss	1–2	Aug 2001	Connecticut Open, U.S.	Tier II	Hard	(Federal Republic of Yugoslavia) Jelena Dokic	(Zimbabwe) Cara Black; (Russia) Elena Likhovtseva	6–0, 3–6, 6–2
Win	2–2	Oct 2001	Linz Open, Austria	Tier II	Carpet	(Federal Republic of Yugoslavia) Jelena Dokic	(Belgium) Els Callens; (United States) Chanda Rubin	6–1, 6–4
Loss	2–3	Sep 2002	Kremlin Cup, Russia	Tier I	Carpet (I)	(Federal Republic of Yugoslavia) Jelena Dokic	(Russia) Elena Dementieva; (Slovakia) Janette Husárová	2–6, 6–3, 7–6^{(9–7)}
Loss	2–4	Oct 2002	Zürich Open, Switzerland	Tier I	Hard (I)	(Federal Republic of Yugoslavia) Jelena Dokic	(Russia) Elena Bovina; (Belgium) Justine Henin	6–2, 7–6^{(7–2)}
Win	3–4	Oct 2002	Linz Open, Austria (2)	Tier II	Carpet	(Federal Republic of Yugoslavia) Jelena Dokic	(Japan) Rika Fujiwara; (Japan) Ai Sugiyama	6–3, 6–2
Loss	3–5	Jun 2003	Rosmalen Open, Netherlands	Tier III	Grass	(France) Mary Pierce	(Russia) Elena Dementieva (Russia) Lina Krasnoroutskaya	2–6, 6–3, 6–4
Loss	3–6	May 2003	Italian Open	Tier I	Clay	(Serbia and Montenegro) Jelena Dokic	(Russia) Svetlana Kuznetsova; (United States) Martina Navratilova	6–4, 5–7, 6–2
Loss	3–7	Sep 2003	Sparkassen Cup, Germany	Tier II	Carpet	(Russia) Elena Likhovtseva	(United States) Martina Navratilova (Russia) Svetlana Kuznetsova	3–6, 6–1, 6–3
Win	4–7	Sep 2003	Kremlin Cup, Russia	Tier I	Carpet	(United States) Meghann Shaughnessy	(Russia) Anastasia Myskina; (Russia) Vera Zvonareva	6–3, 6–4
Win	5–7	Mar 2004	Miami Open, U.S.	Tier I	Hard	(United States) Meghann Shaughnessy	(Russia) Svetlana Kuznetsova (Russia) Elena Likhovtseva	6–2, 6–3
Win	6–7	Apr 2004	Amelia Island Championships, U.S.	Tier II	Hard	(United States) Meghann Shaughnessy	(Switzerland) Myriam Casanova; (Australia) Alicia Molik	3–6, 6–2, 7–5
Win	7–7	May 2004	German Open	Tier I	Clay	(United States) Meghann Shaughnessy	(Slovakia) Janette Husárová (Spain) Conchita Martínez	6–2, 2–6, 6–1
Win	8–7	May 2004	Italian Open	Tier I	Clay	(United States) Meghann Shaughnessy	(Argentina) Paola Suárez; (Spain) Virginia Ruano Pascual	2–6, 6–3, 6–3
Win	9–7	Jul 2004	LA Championships, U.S.	Tier II	Hard	(United States) Meghann Shaughnessy	(Spain) Conchita Martínez (Spain) Virginia Ruano Pascual	6–7^{(2–7)}, 6–4, 6–3
Win	10–7	Aug 2004	Connecticut Open, U.S.	Tier II	Hard	(United States) Meghann Shaughnessy	(United States) Martina Navrátilová (United States) Lisa Raymond	6–1, 1–6, 7–6^{(7–4)}
Win	11–7	Nov 2004	WTA Tour Championships, Los Angeles	Finals	Hard	(United States) Meghann Shaughnessy	(Zimbabwe) Cara Black (Australia) Rennae Stubbs	7–5, 6–2
Loss	11–8	Mar 2005	Indian Wells Open, U.S.	Tier I	Hard	(United States) Meghann Shaughnessy	(Spain) Virginia Ruano Pascual (Argentina) Paola Suárez	7–6^{(7–3)}, 6–1
Loss	11–9	Feb 2006	Dubai Championships, UAE	Tier II	Hard	(Russia) Svetlana Kuznetsova	(Czech Republic) Květa Peschke; (Italy) Francesca Schiavone	3–6, 7–6^{(7–1)}, 6–3
Win	12–9	Aug 2006	Canadian Open	Tier I	Hard	(United States) Martina Navrátilová	(Zimbabwe) Cara Black (Germany) Anna-Lena Grönefeld	6–1, 6–2
Win	13–9	Aug 2008	Cincinnati Open, U.S.	Tier III	Hard	(Russia) Maria Kirilenko	(Chinese Taipei) Hsieh Su-wei; (Russia) Yaroslava Shvedova	6–3, 4–6, [10–8]
Loss	13–10	Sep 2008	Bali Classic, Indonesia	Tier III	Hard	(Poland) Marta Domachowska	(Chinese Taipei) Hsieh Su-wei; (China) Peng Shuai	6–7^{(4–7)}, 7–6^{(7–3)}, 10–7
Win	14–10	Sep 2008	Pan Pacific Open, Japan	Tier I	Hard	(United States) Vania King	(United States) Lisa Raymond (Australia) Samantha Stosur	6–1, 6–4
Win	15–10	Oct 2008	Kremlin Cup, Russia (2)	Tier I	Carpet	(Slovenia) Katarina Srebotnik	(Zimbabwe) Cara Black (United States) Liezel Huber	6–4, 6–4
Win	16–10	Apr 2009	Charleston Open, U.S.	Premier	Clay	(United States) Bethanie Mattek-Sands	(Switzerland) Patty Schnyder; (Latvia) Līga Dekmeijere	6–7^{(5–7)}, 6–2, [11–9]
Win	17–10	May 2009	Stuttgart Open, Germany	Premier	Clay	(United States) Bethanie Mattek-Sands	(Italy) Flavia Pennetta; (Argentina) Gisela Dulko	5–7, 6–3, [10–7]
Win	18–10	Oct 2009	Kremlin Cup, Russia (3)	Premier	Hard(I)	(Russia) Maria Kirilenko	(Russia) Maria Kondratieva; (Czech Republic) Klára Zakopalová	6–2, 6–2
Loss	18–11	Jan 2010	Sydney International, Australia	Premier	Hard	(Italy) Tathiana Garbin	(Zimbabwe) Cara Black (United States) Liezel Huber	6–1, 3–6, 10–3
Loss	18–12	Mar 2010	Indian Wells Open, U.S.	Premier M	Hard	(Australia) Samantha Stosur	(Czech Republic) Květa Peschke (Slovenia) Katarina Srebotnik	4–6, 6–2, [10–5]
Loss	18–13	Apr 2010	Miami Open, U.S.	Premier M	Hard	(Australia) Samantha Stosur	(Argentina) Gisela Dulko (Italy) Flavia Pennetta	6–3, 4–6, [10–7]
Win	19–13	Apr 2010	Charleston Open, U.S. (2)	Premier	Clay	(United States) Liezel Huber	(United States) Vania King (Netherlands) Michaëlla Krajicek	6–3, 6–4
Loss	19–14	Sep 2010	US Open, U.S.	Grand Slam	Hard	(United States) Liezel Huber	(Kazakhstan) Yaroslava Shvedova (United States) Vania King	2–6, 6–4, 7–6^{(7–4)}
Loss	19–15	Feb 2011	Qatar Ladies Open	Premier	Hard	(United States) Liezel Huber	(Czech Republic) Květa Peschke (Slovenia) Katarina Srebotnik	7–5, 6–7^{(2–7)}, [10–8]
Loss	19–16	Apr 2011	Miami Open, U.S.	Premier M	Hard	(United States) Liezel Huber	(Slovakia) Daniela Hantuchová; (Poland) Agnieszka Radwańska	7–6^{(7–5)}, 2–6, [10–8]
Win	20–16	Mar 2012	Miami Open, U.S. (2)	Premier M	Hard	(Russia) Maria Kirilenko	(Italy) Sara Errani (Italy) Roberta Vinci	7–6^{(7–0)}, 4–6, [10–4]
Loss	20–17	Jun 2012	French Open, France	Grand Slam	Clay	(Russia) Maria Kirilenko	(Italy) Sara Errani (Italy) Roberta Vinci	6–4, 4–6, 2–6
Loss	20–18	Jun 2012	Rosmalen Open, Netherlands	International	Grass	(Russia) Maria Kirilenko	(Italy) Sara Errani (Italy) Roberta Vinci	4–6, 6–3, [9–11]
Loss	20–19	Jul 2012	Southern California Open, U.S.	Premier	Hard	(United States) Vania King	(United States) Raquel Kops-Jones; (United States) Abigail Spears	2–6, 4–6
Loss	20–20	Aug 2012	Canadian Open	Premier 5	Hard	(Slovenia) Katarina Srebotnik	(Poland) Klaudia Jans-Ignacik; (France) Kristina Mladenovic	5–7, 6–2, [7–10]
Loss	20–21	Oct 2012	Kremlin Cup, Russia	Premier	Hard (i)	(Russia) Maria Kirilenko	(Russia) Ekaterina Makarova; (Russia) Elena Vesnina	3–6, 6–1, [8–10]
Win	21–21	Oct 2012	Tour Championships, Istanbul (2)	Finals	Hard (i)	(Russia) Maria Kirilenko	(Czech Republic) Andrea Hlaváčková (Czech Republic) Lucie Hradecká	6–1, 6–4
Win	22–21	Jan 2013	Sydney International, Australia	Premier	Hard	(Slovenia) Katarina Srebotnik	(Italy) Sara Errani (Italy) Roberta Vinci	6–3, 6–4
Loss	22–22	Feb 2013	Qatar Ladies Open	Premier 5	Hard	(Slovenia) Katarina Srebotnik	(Italy) Sara Errani (Italy) Roberta Vinci	6–2, 3–6, [6–10]
Loss	22–23	Feb 2013	Dubai Championships, UAE	Premier	Hard	(Slovenia) Katarina Srebotnik	(United States) Bethanie Mattek-Sands (India) Sania Mirza	4–6, 6–2, [7–10]
Loss	22–24	Mar 2013	Indian Wells Open, U.S.	Premier M	Hard	(Slovenia) Katarina Srebotnik	(Russia) Ekaterina Makarova (Russia) Elena Vesnina	0–6, 7–5, [6–10]
Win	23–24	Mar 2013	Miami Open, U.S. (3)	Premier M	Hard	(Slovenia) Katarina Srebotnik	(United States) Lisa Raymond (United Kingdom) Laura Robson	6–1, 7–6^{(7–2)}
Win	24–24	Jun 2013	Eastbourne International, UK	Premier	Grass	(Slovenia) Katarina Srebotnik	(Romania) Monica Niculescu (Czech Republic) Klára Zakopalová	6–3, 6–3

== ITF Junior Circuit ==
=== Singles: 11 (7 titles, 4 runner–ups) ===
Legend
Category GA (1–2)
Category G1 (1–0)
Category G2
Category G3
Category G4 (0–1)
Category G5 (5–1)

Result	W–L	Date	Tournament	Tier	Surface	Opponent	Score
Loss	0–1	Aug 1995	ITF Giza, Egypt	Grade 5	Hard	(Morocco) Habiba Ifrakh	7–5, 6–3
Win	1–1	Sep 1996	ITF Giza, Egypt	Grade 5	Clay	(Eritrea) Seghen Habte-Alemayo	6–3, 6–2
Win	2–1	Sep 1996	ITF Larnaca, Cyprus	Grade 5	Clay	(Russia) Natalia Romashina	7–5, 6–1
Loss	2–2	Apr 1997	ITF Bay Yam, Israel	Grade 4	Hard	(Israel) Rotem Teperberg	6–1, 7–6
Win	3–2	Aug 1997	ITF Egypt	Grade 5	Clay	(Morocco) Meriem Addou	6–1, 6–1
Win	4–2	Aug 1997	ITF Egypt	Grade 5	Clay	(South Africa) Inge Weirich	6–1, 6–0
Win	5–2	Aug 1997	ITF Giza, Egypt	Grade 5	Clay	(Algeria) Sihem Ben Youcef	6–1, 6–1
Win	6–2	Jan 1998	ITF Tlalnepantla, Mexico	Grade 1	Hard	(Venezuela) Milagros Sequera	7–6, 6–1
Win	7–2	Jun 1998	French Open	Grade A	Clay	(Australia) Jelena Dokic	6–2, 6–3
Loss	7–3	Dec 1998	Orange Bowl, U.S.	Grade A	Hard	(Russia) Elena Dementieva	3–6, 6–4, 6–0
Loss	7–4	Sep 1999	US Open	Grade A	Hard	(Russia) Lina Krasnoroutskaya	6–3, 6–2,

=== Doubles: 5 (3 titles, 2 runner–ups) ===
Legend
Category GA (1–1)
Category G1
Category G2
Category G3
Category G4 (1–0)
Category G5 (1–1)

Result	W–L	Date	Tournament	Tier	Surface	Partner	Opponents	Score
Loss	0–1	Sep 1996	ITF Agrinio Tennis Club, Greece	Grade 5	Carpet	(Israel) Anat Katz	(Greece) Eleni Daniilidou (Greece) Daniella Kastamoniti	0–6, 2–6
Win	1–1	Apr 1997	ITF Bat Yam, Israel	Grade 4	Hard	(Portugal) Helga Vieira	(Denmark) Louise Lilleso; (Denmark) Rikke Faurfelt	7–6, 5–7, 6–2
Win	2–1	Aug 1997	ITF Giza, Egypt	Grade 5	Clay	(Egypt) Dina Khalil	(South Africa) Carien Venter; (South Africa) Inge Weirich	6–1, 6–0
Win	3–1	Dec 1998	ITF Bollettieri Sports & Tennis Academy, U.S.	Grade A	Hard	(Hungary) Zsófia Gubacsi	(Belgium) Kim Clijsters; (Slovakia) Daniela Hantuchová	3–6, 6–4, 6–3
Loss	3–2	May 1998	French Open	Grade A	Clay	(Russia) Elena Dementieva	(Belgium) Kim Clijsters; (Australia) Jelena Dokic	4–6, 6–7

== WTA Tour career earnings ==
Petrova earned more than 12 million dollars during her career.

Year	Grand Slam titles (Note: Includes singles, doubles and mixed doubles titles.)	WTA titles	Total titles	Earnings ($)	Money list rank
2001	0	2	2	273,859	36
2002	0	1	1	153,864	73
2003	0	1	1	686,794	15
2004	0	7	7	965,969	13
2005	0	1	1	1,305,000	9
2006	0	6	6	1,559,514	5
2007	0	1	1	810,962	17
2008	0	5	5	1,075,795	11
2009	0	3	3	821,742	19
2010	0	1	1	1,090,595	18
2011	0	1	1	818,993	23
2012	0	5	5	1,769,993	11
2013	0	3	3	811,626	29
2014	0	0	0	69,900	210
Career	0	37	37	12,466,924	42

== Record against other players ==
=== No. 1 wins ===
#	Player	Event	Surface	Round	Score	Outcome
1	(Belgium) Justine Henin	2004 US Open	Hard	4R	6–3, 6–2	QF
2	(France) Amélie Mauresmo	2006 WTA Tour Championships	Hard (i)	RR	6–2, 6–2	RR
3	(United States) Serena Williams	2010 Madrid Open	Clay	3R	4–6, 6–2, 6–3	QF

=== Top 10 wins ===
Season	2000	2001	2002	2003	2004	2005	2006	2007	2008	2009	2010	2011	2012	Total
Wins	1	0	1	4	3	3	5	1	2	1	4	0	4	29

#	Player	vsRank	Event	Surface	Round	Score
2000
1.	(France) Julie Halard-Decugis	9	Miami Open, U.S.	Hard	2R	6–2, 6–3
2002
2.	(Switzerland) Martina Hingis	10	Kremlin Cup, Russia	Carpet (i)	1R	6–2, 6–2
2003
3.	(United States) Jennifer Capriati	7	French Open	Clay	4R	6–3, 4–6, 6–3
4.	(Slovakia) Daniela Hantuchová	9	Southern California Open, U.S.	Hard	3R	6–1, 6–3
5.	(Russia) Elena Dementieva	8	Zurich Open, Switzerland	Hard (i)	2R	7–6^{(7–3)}, 6–3
6.	(United States) Chanda Rubin	10	Advanta Championships, United States	Hard (i)	QF	7–6^{(7–5)}, 7–5
2004
7.	(United States) Serena Williams	7	Amelia Island Championships, U.S.	Clay (green)	QF	6–2, 6–3
8.	(Belgium) Justine Henin	1	US Open	Hard	4R	6–2, 6–3
9.	(Russia) Anastasia Myskina	3	Advanta Championships, United States	Hard (i)	QF	6–3, 4–6, 6–4
2005
10.	(France) Amélie Mauresmo	3	German Open	Clay	QF	6–2, 6–3
11.	(Switzerland) Patty Schnyder	9	Linz Open, Austria	Hard (i)	F	4–6, 6–3, 6–2
12.	(Russia) Maria Sharapova	3	WTA Tour Championships, Los Angeles, USA	Hard (i)	RR	6–1, 6–2
2006
13.	(France) Amélie Mauresmo	2	Qatar Open	Hard	F	6–3, 7–5
14.	(Switzerland) Patty Schnyder	9	Charleston Open, U.S.	Clay (green)	F	6–3, 4–6, 6–1
15.	(Belgium) Justine Henin	7	German Open	Clay	F	4–6, 6–4, 7–5
16.	(Russia) Svetlana Kuznetsova	4	Stuttgart Open, Germany	Hard (i)	SF	6–4, 1–6, 6–4
17.	(France) Amélie Mauresmo	1	WTA Tour Championships, Madrid, Spain	Hard (i)	RR	6–2, 6–2
2007
18.	(France) Amélie Mauresmo	3	Open GDF Suez, France	Hard (i)	SF	5–7, 6–4, 7–6^{(9–7)}
2008
19.	(Serbia) Ana Ivanovic	3	Pan Pacific Open, Japan	Hard	2R	6–1, 1–6, 6–2
20.	(Poland) Agnieszka Radwańska	10	Pan Pacific Open, Japan	Hard	QF	6–3, 6–0
2009
21.	(United States) Serena Williams	2	China Open	Hard	3R	6–4, 3–6, 7–6^{(7–5)}
2010
22.	(Russia) Svetlana Kuznetsova	3	Australian Open	Hard	4R	6–3, 3–6, 6–1
23.	(United States) Serena Williams	1	Madrid Open, Spain	Clay	3R	4–6, 6–2, 6–3
24.	(United States) Venus Williams	2	French Open	Clay	4R	6–4, 6–3
25.	(Australia) Samantha Stosur	6	Connecticut Open, U.S.	Hard	QF	6–2, 6–1
2012
26.	(Australia) Samantha Stosur	6	Miami Open, U.S.	Hard	3R	6–1, 6–7^{(6–8)}, 7–6^{(7–5)}
27.	(Italy) Sara Errani	7	Pan Pacific Open, Japan	Hard	QF	3–6, 7–5, 6–3
28.	(Australia) Samantha Stosur	9	Pan Pacific Open, Japan	Hard	SF	6–4, 6–2
29.	(Poland) Agnieszka Radwańska	3	Pan Pacific Open, Japan	Hard	F	6–0, 1–6, 6–3
