= 2006 Qatar Telecom German Open – Doubles =

Doubles
- 2006 Qatar Telecom German Open

Final
- Champions: (China) Yan Zi (China) Zheng Jie
- Runners-up: (Russia) Elena Dementieva (Italy) Flavia Pennetta
- Score: 6–2, 6–3

Details
- Draw: 28 (2WC/1Q)
- Seeds: 8

Events
Singles	Doubles
- WTA German Open

The doubles Tournament at the 2006 Qatar Telecom German Open took place between 5 May and 13 May 2006 on the outdoor clay courts of the Rot-Weiss Tennis Club in Berlin, Germany. Yan Zi and Zheng Jie won the title, defeating Elena Dementieva and Flavia Pennetta in the final.

== Seeds ==
1. (South Africa) Liezel Huber / (Russia) Elena Likhovtseva (second round)
2. (Slovakia) Daniela Hantuchová / (Japan) Ai Sugiyama (quarterfinals)
3. (China) Yan Zi / (China) Zheng Jie (champions)
4. (Germany) Anna-Lena Grönefeld / (Russia) Nadia Petrova (semifinals)
5. (Russia) Elena Dementieva / (Italy) Flavia Pennetta (final)
6. (Argentina) Gisela Dulko / (Russia) Maria Kirilenko (second round)
7. (China) Li Ting / (China) Sun Tiantian (first round)
8. (Greece) Eleni Daniilidou / (Spain) Anabel Medina Garrigues (quarterfinals)

== Draw ==
Key

- Q = Qualifier
- WC = Wild card
- LL = Lucky loser
- Alt = Alternate
- ITF = ITF entry
- PR = Protected ranking
- SR = Special ranking
- SE = Special exempt
- JE = Junior exempt
- JR = Junior Accelerator Programme entrant
- CO = College Accelerator Programme entrant
- NG = Next Gen Accelerator Program entrant
- w/o = Walkover
- r = Retired
- d = Defaulted

=== Finals ===
Semifinals
(Russia) Dinara Safina (Italy) Roberta Vinci	2	0
3	(China) Yan Zi (China) Zheng Jie	6	6
4	(Germany) Anna-Lena Grönefeld (Russia) Nadia Petrova	3	3
5	(Russia) Elena Dementieva (Italy) Flavia Pennetta	6	6

Final
3	(China) Yan Zi (China) Zheng Jie	6	6
5	(Russia) Elena Dementieva (Italy) Flavia Pennetta	2	3

=== Top half ===
First round
(France) S Brémond (France) S Cohen-Aloro	1	5
(Russia) D Safina (Italy) R Vinci	6	7
(Serbia and Montenegro) J Janković (Slovenia) T Križan	3	3
WC	(Germany) A Bachmann (Germany) V Henke	6	6
(Russia) V Dushevina (Russia) G Voskoboeva	7	6
7	(China) T Li (China) T Sun	5	0
(Italy) T Garbin (Italy) M Santangelo	7	6
WC	(Germany) S Klösel (Germany) K Wörle	5	3
(Poland) K Jans (Bosnia and Herzegovina) M Jugić-Salkić	6	3	3
(Russia) A Rodionova (Romania) A Vanc	4	6	6
(United States) M Tu (Russia) V Zvonareva	4	4
8	(Greece) E Daniilidou (Spain) A Medina Garrigues	6	6

Second round
1	(South Africa) L Huber (Russia) E Likhovtseva	4	6^{6}
(Russia) D Safina (Italy) R Vinci	6	7
(Germany) A Bachmann (Germany) V Henke	1	5
(Russia) V Dushevina (Russia) G Voskoboeva	6	7
3	(China) Z Yan (China) J Zheng	6	6
(Italy) T Garbin (Italy) M Santangelo	4	2
(Russia) A Rodionova (Romania) A Vanc	3	6	1
8	(Greece) E Daniilidou (Spain) A Medina Garrigues	6	0	6

Quarterfinals
(Russia) D Safina (Italy) R Vinci	6	7
(Russia) V Dushevina (Russia) G Voskoboeva	3	5
3	(China) Z Yan (China) J Zheng	7	6
8	(Greece) E Daniilidou (Spain) A Medina Garrigues	5	4

Semifinals
(Russia) D Safina (Italy) R Vinci	2	0
3	(China) Z Yan (China) J Zheng	6	6

=== Bottom half ===
First round
6	(Argentina) G Dulko (Russia) M Kirilenko	6	6
(Austria) D Klemenschits (Austria) S Klemenschits	1	1
(Czech Republic) I Benešová (Netherlands) M Krajicek	6	6
(Slovenia) K Srebotnik (Germany) J Wöhr	2	2
(Zimbabwe) C Black (France) N Dechy	7	3	7
(Russia) A Chakvetadze (Russia) E Vesnina	5	6	5
5	(Russia) E Dementieva (Italy) F Pennetta	6	6
(Ukraine) K Bondarenko (Czech Republic) H Šromová	2	3
Q	(Finland) E Laine (Germany) L Siegemund	6^{4}	3
(Argentina) ME Salerni (Australia) B Stewart	7	6
(Colombia) C Castaño (United States) J Craybas	4	6	7
(Germany) M Müller (Germany) J Schruff	6	4	5

Second round
6	(Argentina) G Dulko (Russia) M Kirilenko	6	6
(Czech Republic) I Benešová (Netherlands) M Krajicek	3	2
(Zimbabwe) C Black (France) N Dechy	5	3
4	(Germany) AL Grönefeld (Russia) N Petrova	7	6
5	(Russia) E Dementieva (Italy) F Pennetta	6	4	6
(Argentina) ME Salerni (Australia) B Stewart	4	6	2
(Colombia) C Castaño (United States) J Craybas	6^{1}	1
2	(Slovakia) D Hantuchová (Japan) A Sugiyama	7	6

Quarterfinals
(Czech Republic) I Benešová (Netherlands) M Krajicek	2	1
4	(Germany) AL Grönefeld (Russia) N Petrova	6	6
5	(Russia) E Dementieva (Italy) F Pennetta	6	5	3
2	(Slovakia) D Hantuchová (Japan) A Sugiyama	0	7	6

Semifinals
4	(Germany) AL Grönefeld (Russia) N Petrova	3	3
5	(Russia) E Dementieva (Italy) F Pennetta	6	6

== Qualifying ==
=== Qualifying seeds ===
1. (Slovakia) Jarmila Gajdošová / (Germany) Caroline Schneider (qualifying competition)
2. (Finland) Emma Laine / (Germany) Laura Siegemund (qualified)

=== Qualifiers ===
1. (Finland) Emma Laine / (Germany) Laura Siegemund

=== Qualifying draw ===
First round
1	(Slovakia) Jarmila Gajdošová (Germany) Caroline Schneider	9
(Germany) Sabine Lisicki (Germany) Angelika Rösch	7
(Germany) Tatjana Malek (Germany) Andrea Petkovic	2
2/WC	(Finland) Emma Laine (Germany) Laura Siegemund	8

Qualifying competition
1	(Slovakia) Jarmila Gajdošová (Germany) Caroline Schneider	5	6	1
2/WC	(Finland) Emma Laine (Germany) Laura Siegemund	7	4	6
