= 2004 Ladies German Open – Singles =

Singles
- 2004 Ladies German Open

Final
- Champion: (France) Amélie Mauresmo
- Runner-up: (United States) Venus Williams
- Score: Walkover

Details
- Draw: 56 (4WC/12Q/2LL)
- Seeds: 17

Events
Singles	Doubles
← 2003 ·	WTA German Open	· 2005 →

Amélie Mauresmo won the singles tennis title at the 2004 WTA German Open by walkover, as her opponent Venus Williams withdrew due to a left ankle strain. It was the first title of the year for Mauresmo, and the 11th title of her career.

Justine Henin-Hardenne was the two-time reigning champion, but did not compete this year due to a cytomegalovirus.

== Seeds ==
The first eight seeds received a bye into the second round.

1. (Belgium) Kim Clijsters (third round, withdrew due to a left wrist tendonitis)
2. (France) Amélie Mauresmo (champion)
3. (United States) Venus Williams (final, withdrew due to a left ankle strain)
4. (Russia) Anastasia Myskina (quarterfinals)
5. (Russia) Nadia Petrova (third round)
6. (United States) Jennifer Capriati (semifinals)
7. (Russia) Elena Dementieva (third round)
8. (Japan) Ai Sugiyama (third round)
9. (Russia) Vera Zvonareva (second round)
10. (Russia) Svetlana Kuznetsova (quarterfinals)
11. (Argentina) Paola Suárez (quarterfinals)
12. (Italy) ~~Silvia Farina Elia~~ (withdrew due to a left adductor strain)
13. (Switzerland) Patty Schnyder (third round, withdrew due to a left upper arm strain)
14. (Spain) Conchita Martínez (first round)
15. (Serbia and Montenegro) Jelena Dokic (first round)
16. (Israel) Anna Smashnova-Pistolesi (third round)
17. (Russia) Maria Sharapova (third round)

== Draw ==
=== Key ===
- Q = Qualifier
- WC = Wild card
- LL = Lucky loser
- Alt = Alternate
- ITF = ITF entry
- PR = Protected ranking
- SR = Special ranking
- SE = Special exempt
- JE = Junior exempt
- JR = Junior Accelerator Programme entrant
- CO = College Accelerator Programme entrant
- NG = Next Gen Accelerator Program entrant
- w/o = Walkover
- r = Retired
- d = Defaulted

=== Finals ===
Quarterfinals
(Croatia) Karolina Šprem	6	6
(Colombia) Fabiola Zuluaga	3	3
PR/3	(United States) Venus Williams	7^{7}	5	6
11	(Argentina) Paola Suárez	6^{5}	7	2
6	(United States) Jennifer Capriati	6	6
4	(Russia) Anastasia Myskina	3	2
10	(Russia) Svetlana Kuznetsova	7^{7}	3	1
2	(France) Amélie Mauresmo	6^{5}	6	6

Semifinals
(Croatia) Karolina Šprem	6	3	4
PR/3	(United States) Venus Williams	2	6	6
6	(United States) Jennifer Capriati	2	0
2	(France) Amélie Mauresmo	6	6

Final
PR/3	(United States) Venus Williams
2	(France) Amélie Mauresmo	w/o

=== Top half ===
==== Section 1 ====
First round
Q	(Italy) ME Camerin	2	3
Q	(Spain) M Marrero	6	6
WC	(Germany) A-L Grönefeld	4	2
(Croatia) K Šprem	6	6
(United States) M Shaughnessy	6	6
15	(Serbia and Montenegro) J Dokic	0	3
9	(Russia) V Zvonareva	6	6
Q	(Ukraine) T Perebiynis	3	4
(Colombia) F Zuluaga	7	6
PR	(France) S Testud	5	1
(France) M Pierce	7^{7}	5	6^{3}
(Russia) E Likhovtseva	6^{3}	7	7^{7}

Second round
1	(Belgium) K Clijsters	6	2	6
Q	(Spain) M Marrero	3	6	4
(Croatia) K Šprem	6	7^{7}
(United States) M Shaughnessy	2	6^{3}
9	(Russia) V Zvonareva	1	7^{7}	1
(Colombia) F Zuluaga	6	6^{2}	6
(Russia) E Likhovtseva	1	2
8	(Japan) A Sugiyama	6	6

Third round
1	(Belgium) K Clijsters
(Croatia) K Šprem	w/o
(Colombia) F Zuluaga	7^{7}	3	6
8	(Japan) A Sugiyama	6^{4}	6	4

Quarterfinals
(Croatia) K Šprem	6	6
(Colombia) F Zuluaga	3	3

==== Section 2 ====
First round
Q	(France) T Golovin	5	6	3
(Greece) E Daniilidou	7	3	6
(France) N Dechy	6	7^{7}
Q	(Czech Republic) B Strýcová	4	6^{4}
(Bulgaria) M Maleeva	3	1
16	(Israel) A Smashnova-Pistolesi	6	6
11	(Argentina) P Suárez	6	7
Q	(Spain) A Medina Garrigues	2	5
(Austria) B Schett	6	6
LL	(Slovenia) K Srebotnik	3	3
(Germany) A Barna	4	7^{9}	6
(Australia) N Pratt	6	6^{7}	4

Second round
PR/3	(United States) V Williams	7	6
(Greece) E Daniilidou	5	3
(France) N Dechy	6	4	1
16	(Israel) A Smashnova-Pistolesi	1	6	6
11	(Argentina) P Suárez	6	6
(Austria) B Schett	4	3
(Germany) A Barna	4	3
5	(Russia) N Petrova	6	6

Third round
PR/3	(United States) V Williams	6	6
16	(Israel) A Smashnova-Pistolesi	3	1
11	(Argentina) P Suárez	6	7^{8}
5	(Russia) N Petrova	1	6^{6}

Quarterfinals
PR/3	(United States) V Williams	7^{7}	5	6
11	(Argentina) P Suárez	6^{5}	7	2

=== Bottom half ===
==== Section 3 ====
First round
WC	(Germany) J Schruff	6	6
Q	(United States) M Tu	1	1
LL	(Ukraine) J Vakulenko	3	3
(Hungary) P Mandula	6	6
(Russia) D Safina	1	6	3
17	(Russia) M Sharapova	6	1	6
13	(Switzerland) P Schnyder	6	6
(Slovakia) D Hantuchová	2	2
Q	(Switzerland) E Gagliardi	6	6
(Zimbabwe) C Black	1	3
Q	(Croatia) J Kostanić	7^{7}	6
(Slovenia) T Pisnik	6^{4}	3

Second round
6	(United States) J Capriati	6	6
WC	(Germany) J Schruff	3	1
(Hungary) P Mandula	4^{r}
17	(Russia) M Sharapova	5
13	(Switzerland) P Schnyder	6	6
Q	(Switzerland) E Gagliardi	3	4
Q	(Croatia) J Kostanić	2	4
4	(Russia) A Myskina	6	6

Third round
6	(United States) J Capriati	5	6	6
17	(Russia) M Sharapova	7	4	1
13	(Switzerland) P Schnyder
4	(Russia) A Myskina	w/o

Quarterfinals
6	(United States) J Capriati	6	6
4	(Russia) A Myskina	3	2

==== Section 4 ====
First round
WC	(Germany) S Gehrlein	3	5
Q	(France) S Cohen-Aloro	6	7
Q	(China) Z Yan	7^{7}	5	2
(Russia) E Bovina	6^{5}	7	6
WC	(Switzerland) M-G Mikaelian	3	1
10	(Russia) S Kuznetsova	6	6
14	(Spain) C Martínez	3	6	4
(Spain) M Sánchez Lorenzo	6	3	6
(Spain) A Parra Santonja	4	0
(Czech Republic) D Chládková	6	6
Q	(Czech Republic) M Paštiková	4	3
(Argentina) G Dulko	6	6

Second round
7	(Russia) E Dementieva	6	3	6
Q	(France) S Cohen-Aloro	4	6	2
(Russia) E Bovina	2	0
10	(Russia) S Kuznetsova	6	6
(Spain) M Sánchez Lorenzo	6	4	3
(Czech Republic) D Chládková	2	6	6
(Argentina) G Dulko	1	2
2	(France) A Mauresmo	6	6

Third round
7	(Russia) E Dementieva	2	7^{7}	4
10	(Russia) S Kuznetsova	6	6^{5}	6
(Czech Republic) D Chládková	1	2
2	(France) A Mauresmo	6	6

Quarterfinals
10	(Russia) S Kuznetsova	7^{7}	3	1
2	(France) A Mauresmo	6^{5}	6	6

== Qualifying ==
=== Qualifying seeds ===
1. (Croatia) Jelena Kostanić (qualified)
2. (China) Zheng Jie (first round)
3. (Slovenia) Katarina Srebotnik (qualifying competition, lucky loser)
4. (Slovakia) Ľubomíra Kurhajcová (first round)
5. (Spain) Anabel Medina Garrigues (qualified)
6. (China) Yan Zi (qualified)
7. (Czech Republic) Barbora Strýcová (qualified)
8. (n/a)
9. (France) Marion Bartoli (qualifying competition)
10. (Italy) Maria Elena Camerin (qualified)
11. (Ukraine) Julia Vakulenko (qualifying competition, lucky loser)
12. (France) Tatiana Golovin (qualified)
13. (Spain) Marta Marrero (qualified)
14. (Spain) Virginia Ruano Pascual (qualifying competition)
15. (Italy) Tathiana Garbin (qualifying competition)
16. (Belgium) Els Callens (qualifying competition)
17. (Italy) Rita Grande (first round)
18. (Russia) Alina Jidkova (first round)
19. (France) Stéphanie Cohen-Aloro (qualified)
20. (Ukraine) Tatiana Perebiynis (qualified)
21. (Spain) Gala León García (qualifying competition)
22. (Czech Republic) Sandra Kleinová (first round)
23. (Switzerland) Emmanuelle Gagliardi (qualified)
24. (n/a)
25. (Madagascar) Dally Randriantefy (qualifying competition)
26. (Spain) Conchita Martínez Granados (qualifying competition)

=== Qualifiers ===
1. (Croatia) Jelena Kostanić
2. (Switzerland) Emmanuelle Gagliardi
3. (United States) Meilen Tu
4. (Ukraine) Tatiana Perebiynis
5. (Spain) Anabel Medina Garrigues
6. (China) Yan Zi
7. (Czech Republic) Barbora Strýcová
8. (France) Stéphanie Cohen-Aloro
9. (Czech Republic) Michaela Paštiková
10. (Italy) Maria Elena Camerin
11. (Spain) Marta Marrero
12. (France) Tatiana Golovin

=== Lucky losers ===
1. (Slovenia) Katarina Srebotnik
2. (Ukraine) Julia Vakulenko

=== Qualifying draw ===
==== First qualifier ====
First round
1	(Croatia) Jelena Kostanić	6	6
(Australia) Samantha Stosur	2	0
(Bosnia and Herzegovina) Mervana Jugić-Salkić	3	4
21	(Spain) Gala León García	6	6

Qualifying competition
1	(Croatia) Jelena Kostanić	6	6
21	(Spain) Gala León García	3	1

==== Second qualifier ====
First round
2	(China) Zheng Jie	4	1
(Italy) Roberta Vinci	6	6
(Germany) Barbara Rittner	6^{0}	4
23	(Switzerland) Emmanuelle Gagliardi	7^{7}	6

Qualifying competition
(Italy) Roberta Vinci	6	4	1
23	(Switzerland) Emmanuelle Gagliardi	2	6	6

==== Third qualifier ====
First round
3	(Slovenia) Katarina Srebotnik	7	2	6
(Italy) Antonella Serra Zanetti	5	6	4
(United States) Meilen Tu	6	6
22	(Czech Republic) Sandra Kleinová	1	0

Qualifying competition
3	(Slovenia) Katarina Srebotnik	2	2
(United States) Meilen Tu	6	6

==== Fourth qualifier ====
First round
4	(Slovakia) Ľubomíra Kurhajcová	6^{4}	6	1
(Croatia) Silvija Talaja	7^{7}	3	6
WC	(Germany) Angelique Kerber	1	1
20	(Ukraine) Tatiana Perebiynis	6	6

Qualifying competition
(Croatia) Silvija Talaja	3	7^{7}	3
20	(Ukraine) Tatiana Perebiynis	6	6^{2}	6

==== Fifth qualifier ====
First round
5	(Spain) Anabel Medina Garrigues	6	6
(France) Camille Pin	1	2
WC	(Germany) Angelika Bachmann	6	4	4
16	(Belgium) Els Callens	3	6	6

Qualifying competition
5	(Spain) Anabel Medina Garrigues	6	6
16	(Belgium) Els Callens	0	1

==== Sixth qualifier ====
First round
Alt	(China) Yan Zi	7	6
(Russia) Galina Voskoboeva	5	4
WC	(Germany) Syna Schreiber	6	6
17	(Italy) Rita Grande	0	0

Qualifying competition
Alt	(China) Yan Zi	6	6
WC	(Germany) Syna Schreiber	0	3

==== Seventh qualifier ====
First round
7	(Czech Republic) Barbora Strýcová	7	6
(China) Sun Tiantian	5	3
SR	(Czech Republic) Květa Peschke	2	6	6^{3}
25	(Madagascar) Dally Randriantefy	6	1	7^{7}

Qualifying competition
7	(Czech Republic) Barbora Strýcová	6	6
25	(Madagascar) Dally Randriantefy	4	3

==== Eighth qualifier ====
First round
26	(Spain) Conchita Martínez Granados	6	6
(Estonia) Maret Ani	4	2
(Sweden) Sofia Arvidsson	2	1
19	(France) Stéphanie Cohen-Aloro	6	6

Qualifying competition
26	(Spain) Conchita Martínez Granados	3	7^{10}	4
19	(France) Stéphanie Cohen-Aloro	6	6^{8}	6

==== Ninth qualifier ====
First round
9	(France) Marion Bartoli	6	6
(Italy) Adriana Serra Zanetti	1	4
(Czech Republic) Michaela Paštiková	7	6
18	(Russia) Alina Jidkova	5	2

Qualifying competition
9	(France) Marion Bartoli	2	3
(Czech Republic) Michaela Paštiková	6	6

==== Tenth qualifier ====
First round
10	(Italy) Maria Elena Camerin	6	6
Alt	(Ukraine) Elena Tatarkova	4	1
WC	(Germany) Vanessa Henke	2	3
14	(Spain) Virginia Ruano Pascual	6	6

Qualifying competition
10	(Italy) Maria Elena Camerin	6	2	6
14	(Spain) Virginia Ruano Pascual	2	6	2

==== Eleventh qualifier ====
First round
11	(Ukraine) Julia Vakulenko	6	6
WC	(Germany) Angelika Rösch	1	4
(Czech Republic) Zuzana Ondrášková	2	2
13	(Spain) Marta Marrero	6	6

Qualifying competition
11	(Ukraine) Julia Vakulenko	2	2
13	(Spain) Marta Marrero	6	6

==== Twelfth qualifier ====
First round
12	(France) Tatiana Golovin	6	6
(Tunisia) Selima Sfar	3	4
WC	(Germany) Sandra Klösel	4	6	4
15	(Italy) Tathiana Garbin	6	4	6

Qualifying competition
12	(France) Tatiana Golovin	6	6
15	(Italy) Tathiana Garbin	2	0
