= 2006 Qatar Telecom German Open =

- Date: 5–13 May
- Edition: 95th
- Category: Tier I
- Draw: 56S / 28D
- Prize money: $1,340,000
- Surface: Clay / outdoor
- Location: Berlin, Germany
- Venue: Rot-Weiss Tennis Club

Champions

Singles
- (Russia) Nadia Petrova

Doubles
- (China) Yan Zi / (China) Zheng Jie
- WTA German Open

The 2006 Qatar Telecom German Open was a women's tennis event that was played at the Rot-Weiss Tennis Club in Berlin, Germany from 5 May until 13 May 2006. It was the 95th edition of the tournament. It was one of two Tier I events that took place on red clay courts in the build-up to the second Grand Slam of the year, the French Open. Second-seeded Nadia Petrova won the singles title.

== Finals ==
=== Singles ===
(Russia) Nadia Petrova defeated (Belgium) Justine Henin-Hardenne 4–6, 6–4, 7–5

- It was Petrovas's 4th singles title of the year and the 5th of her career.

=== Doubles ===
(China) Yan Zi / (China) Zheng Jie defeated (Russia) Elena Dementieva / (Italy) Flavia Pennetta 6–2, 6–3
