= 2006 Family Circle Cup =

- Date: April 10–16
- Edition: 34th
- Category: WTA Tier I
- Draw: 56S / 28D
- Surface: Clay / outdoor
- Location: Charleston, South Carolina, U.S.
- Venue: Family Circle Tennis Center
- Attendance: 92,375

Champions

Singles
- (Russia) Nadia Petrova

Doubles
- (United States) Lisa Raymond / (Australia) Samantha Stosur
- Family Circle Cup

The 2006 Family Circle Cup was the 34th edition of the Family Circle Cup women's tennis tournament. This WTA Tier I event was held at the Family Circle Tennis Center in Charleston, South Carolina, United States and played on outdoor clay courts. Second-seeded Nadia Petrova won the singles title.

== Finals ==
=== Singles ===
(Russia) Nadia Petrova defeated (Switzerland) Patty Schnyder, 6–3, 4–6, 6–1

- It was Petrova's 3rd singles title of the year and the 4th of her career.

=== Doubles ===
(United States) Lisa Raymond / (Australia) Samantha Stosur defeated (Spain) Virginia Ruano Pascual / (United States) Meghann Shaughnessy, 3–6, 6–1, 6–1
