= 2006 Family Circle Cup – Doubles =

Doubles
- 2006 Family Circle Cup

Final
- Champions: (United States) Lisa Raymond (Australia) Samantha Stosur
- Runners-up: (Spain) Virginia Ruano Pascual (United States) Meghann Shaughnessy
- Score: 3–6, 6–1, 6–1

Details
- Draw: 16
- Seeds: 8

Events
Singles	Doubles
- Family Circle Cup

The doubles Tournament at the 2006 Family Circle Cup took place between April 10 and April 16 on the outdoor hard clay of the Family Circle Tennis Center in Charleston, United States. The first-seeded team of Lisa Raymond and Samantha Stosur won the title, defeating Virginia Ruano Pascual and Meghann Shaughnessy in the final.

== Seeds ==
1. (United States) Lisa Raymond / (Australia) Samantha Stosur (champions)
2. (Spain) Virginia Ruano Pascual / (United States) Meghann Shaughnessy (final)
3. (South Africa) Liezel Huber / (Czech Republic) Květa Peschke (quarterfinals)
4. (United States) Corina Morariu / (Australia) Rennae Stubbs (second round)
5. (Japan) Shinobu Asagoe / (Slovenia) Katarina Srebotnik (semifinals)
6. (Germany) Anna-Lena Grönefeld / (Russia) Nadia Petrova (semifinals)
7. (United States) Meilen Tu / (Russia) Vera Zvonareva (second round)
8. (Spain) Lourdes Domínguez Lino / (Venezuela) María Vento-Kabchi (quarterfinals)

== Draw ==
Key

- Q = Qualifier
- WC = Wild card
- LL = Lucky loser
- Alt = Alternate
- ITF = ITF entry
- PR = Protected ranking
- SR = Special ranking
- SE = Special exempt
- JE = Junior exempt
- JR = Junior Accelerator Programme entrant
- CO = College Accelerator Programme entrant
- NG = Next Gen Accelerator Program entrant
- w/o = Walkover
- r = Retired
- d = Defaulted

=== Finals ===
Semifinals					Final
1	(United States) Lisa Raymond (Australia) Samantha Stosur	w/o
6	(Germany) Anna-Lena Grönefeld (Russia) Nadia Petrova				1	(United States) Lisa Raymond (Australia) Samantha Stosur	3	6	6
5	(Japan) Shinobu Asagoe (Slovenia) Katarina Srebotnik	3	7	3	2	(Spain) Virginia Ruano Pascual (United States) Meghann Shaughnessy	6	1	1
2	(Spain) Virginia Ruano Pascual (United States) Meghann Shaughnessy	6	6^{4}	6

=== Top half ===
First round
WC	(United States) CA Avants (United States) S Fonseca	3	4
(France) M Bartoli (Australia) N Pratt	6	6
WC	(United States) J Jackson (United States) S Perry	6	4	3
(Ukraine) A Bondarenko (Ukraine) K Bondarenko	4	6	6
(Latvia) L Dekmeijere (Czech Republic) H Šromová	6	4	2
8	(Spain) L Domínguez Lino (Venezuela) M Vento-Kabchi	2	6	6
Q	(Germany) A Bachmann (Germany) V Henke	7	7
(United States) J Craybas (United States) L Granville	5	6^{1}
(Argentina) ME Salerni (Australia) B Stewart	7	3	3
(Serbia and Montenegro) J Janković (China) S Peng	6^{3}	6	6
(Ukraine) Y Fedak (United States) N Uberoi	3	2
6	(Germany) AL Grönefeld (Russia) N Petrova	6	6

Second round
1	(United States) L Raymond (Australia) S Stosur	w/o
(France) M Bartoli (Australia) N Pratt
(Ukraine) A Bondarenko (Ukraine) K Bondarenko	2	4
8	(Spain) L Domínguez Lino (Venezuela) M Vento-Kabchi	6	6
3	(South Africa) L Huber (Czech Republic) K Peschke	6	6
Q	(Germany) A Bachmann (Germany) V Henke	1	4
(Serbia and Montenegro) J Janković (China) S Peng
6	(Germany) AL Grönefeld (Russia) N Petrova	w/o

Quarterfinals
1	(United States) L Raymond (Australia) S Stosur	6	6
8	(Spain) L Domínguez Lino (Venezuela) M Vento-Kabchi	2	1
3	(South Africa) L Huber (Czech Republic) K Peschke	6	4	5
6	(Germany) AL Grönefeld (Russia) N Petrova	4	6	7

Semifinals
1	(United States) L Raymond (Australia) S Stosur	w/o
(Germany) AL Grönefeld (Russia) N Petrova

=== Bottom half ===
First round
5	(Japan) S Asagoe (Slovenia) K Srebotnik	6	6
(Australia) L McShea (United States) J Russell	3	0
WC	(Canada) M Drake (Czech Republic) N Vaidišová	4	6	6
(Czech Republic) I Benešová (Czech Republic) E Birnerová	6	0	4
(Spain) C Martínez Granados (Venezuela) M Sequera	1	4
(United States) A Harkleroad (Russia) G Voskoboeva	6	6
7	(United States) M Tu (Russia) V Zvonareva	7	6
(Czech Republic) G Navrátilová (Czech Republic) V Uhlířová	6^{4}	4
(France) S Foretz (France) A Serra Zanetti	3	4
(Italy) M Santangelo (United States) M Washington	6	6
(Russia) D Safina (Russia) E Vesnina	6	5	2
(Italy) ME Camerin (Spain) A Parra Santonja	1	7	6

Second round
5	(Japan) S Asagoe (Slovenia) K Srebotnik	6	6
WC	(Canada) M Drake (Czech Republic) N Vaidišová	3	4
(United States) A Harkleroad (Russia) G Voskoboeva	6	6
4	(United States) C Morariu (Australia) R Stubbs	1	2
7	(United States) M Tu (Russia) V Zvonareva	7	0^{r}
(Italy) M Santangelo (United States) M Washington	6^{4}	0
(Italy) ME Camerin (Spain) A Parra Santonja
2	(Spain) V Ruano Pascual (United States) M Shaughnessy	w/o

Quarterfinals
5	(Japan) S Asagoe (Slovenia) K Srebotnik	6	6
(United States) A Harkleroad (Russia) G Voskoboeva	1	3
(Italy) M Santangelo (United States) M Washington	0	6	2
2	(Spain) V Ruano Pascual (United States) M Shaughnessy	6	4	6

Semifinals
5	(Japan) S Asagoe (Slovenia) K Srebotnik	3	7	3
2	(Spain) V Ruano Pascual (United States) M Shaughnessy	6	6^{4}	6
