= 2013 Qatar Total Open – Singles =

Singles
- 2013 Qatar Total Open

Final
- Champion: (Belarus) Victoria Azarenka
- Runner-up: (United States) Serena Williams
- Score: 7–6^{(8–6)}, 2–6, 6–3

Details
- Draw: 56
- Seeds: 16

Events
Singles	Doubles
← 2012 ·	Qatar Total Open	· 2014 →

Defending champion Victoria Azarenka defeated Serena Williams in the final, 7–6^{(8–6)}, 2–6, 6–3 to win the singles tennis title at the 2013 WTA Qatar Open.

All of the top three seeds (Azarenka, Williams and Maria Sharapova) were in contention for the world No. 1 ranking at the start of the tournament. Williams regained the World No. 1 ranking for the first time since October 2010, becoming the oldest No. 1 player in the history of the WTA, after she beat Petra Kvitová in the quarterfinals. She would remain the world No. 1 for a further 186 weeks until 12 September 2016, when she was replaced by Angelique Kerber, tying Steffi Graf's record for longest consecutive spell at No. 1.

== Seeds ==
The top eight seeds receive a bye into the second round.

1. (Belarus) Victoria Azarenka (champion)
2. (United States) Serena Williams (final)
3. (Russia) Maria Sharapova (semifinals)
4. (Poland) Agnieszka Radwańska (semifinals)
5. (Germany) Angelique Kerber (second round)
6. (Italy) Sara Errani (quarterfinals)
7. (Czech Republic) Petra Kvitová (quarterfinals)
8. (Australia) Samantha Stosur (quarterfinals)
9. (France) Marion Bartoli (second round)
10. (Denmark) Caroline Wozniacki (quarterfinals)
11. (Russia) Nadia Petrova (third round)
12. (Russia) Maria Kirilenko (first round, retired because of a shoulder injury)
13. (Serbia) Ana Ivanovic (third round)
14. (Slovakia) Dominika Cibulková (withdrew)
15. (Italy) Roberta Vinci (second round)
16. (United States) Sloane Stephens (second round)
17. (Czech Republic) Lucie Šafářová (second round)

== Draw ==
=== Key ===
- Q = Qualifier
- WC = Wild card
- LL = Lucky loser
- Alt = Alternate
- SE = Special exempt
- PR = Protected ranking
- ITF = ITF entry
- JE = Junior exempt
- w/o = Walkover
- r = Retired
- d = Defaulted
- SR = Special ranking

=== Finals ===
Quarterfinals
1	(Belarus) Victoria Azarenka	6	6
6	(Italy) Sara Errani	2	2
4	(Poland) Agnieszka Radwańska	6	7
10	(Denmark) Caroline Wozniacki	2	5
8	(Australia) Samantha Stosur	2	4
3	(Russia) Maria Sharapova	6	6
7	(Czech Republic) Petra Kvitová	6	3	5
2	(United States) Serena Williams	3	6	7

Semifinals
1	(Belarus) Victoria Azarenka	6	6
4	(Poland) Agnieszka Radwańska	3	3
3	(Russia) Maria Sharapova	3	2
2	(United States) Serena Williams	6	6

Final
1	(Belarus) Victoria Azarenka	7^{8}	2	6
2	(United States) Serena Williams	6^{6}	6	3

=== Top half ===
==== Section 1 ====
First round
(Bulgaria) T Pironkova	6^{2}	5
(Switzerland) R Oprandi	7^{7}	7
(United States) C McHale	6	6
Q	(Russia) V Dushevina	1	2
(Greece) E Daniilidou	2	3
17	(Czech Republic) L Šafářová	6	6
12	(Russia) M Kirilenko	0^{r}
Q	(Russia) E Bychkova	3
(United Kingdom) L Robson	4	1
(Slovakia) D Hantuchová	6	6
WC	(Canada) H El Tabakh	2	3
(Hungary) T Babos	6	6

Second round
1	(Belarus) V Azarenka	6	6
(Switzerland) R Oprandi	2	3
(United States) C McHale	6	6
17	(Czech Republic) L Šafářová	4	2
Q	(Russia) E Bychkova	3	6	3
(Slovakia) D Hantuchová	6	1	6
(Hungary) T Babos	4	0
6	(Italy) S Errani	6	6

Third round
1	(Belarus) V Azarenka	6	6
(United States) C McHale	0	0
(Slovakia) D Hantuchová	5	7	2
6	(Italy) S Errani	7	5	6

Quarterfinals
1	(Belarus) V Azarenka	6	6
6	(Italy) S Errani	2	2

==== Section 2 ====
First round
(China) J Zheng	2	3
Q	(Australia) A Rodionova	6	6
(Romania) S Halep	6	6
(Belarus) O Govortsova	1	0
(Austria) T Paszek	1	2
13	(Serbia) A Ivanovic	6	6
10	(Denmark) C Wozniacki	6	6
LL	(Bosnia and Herzegovina) M Jugić-Salkić	1	2
(Romania) S Cîrstea	2	6	6
WC	(Tunisia) O Jabeur	6	3	0
(Germany) M Barthel	6	6
Q	(Kazakhstan) Y Putintseva	4	2

Second round
4	(Poland) A Radwańska	6	6
Q	(Australia) A Rodionova	3	2
(Romania) S Halep	3	0^{r}
13	(Serbia) A Ivanovic	6	0
10	(Denmark) C Wozniacki	7^{9}	6
(Romania) S Cîrstea	6^{7}	0
(Germany) M Barthel	6	6
5	(Germany) A Kerber	1	2

Third round
4	(Poland) A Radwańska	6	7^{8}
13	(Serbia) A Ivanovic	1	6^{6}
10	(Denmark) C Wozniacki	7^{8}	6
(Germany) M Barthel	6^{6}	3

Quarterfinals
4	(Poland) A Radwańska	6	7
10	(Denmark) C Wozniacki	2	5

=== Bottom half ===
==== Section 3 ====
First round
(Romania) M Niculescu	6	6
(Serbia) J Janković	4	1
(Russia) S Kuznetsova	7^{7}	6
Q	(United States) B Mattek-Sands	6^{1}	4
(Italy) F Schiavone	6^{5}	3
9	(France) M Bartoli	7^{7}	6
16	(United States) S Stephens	6	6
(Georgia (country)) A Tatishvili	2	2
(Czech Republic) K Zakopalová	7^{10}	3
(United States) V Lepchenko	6^{8}	0^{r}
Q	(France) C Garcia	6	6
WC	(Oman) F Al Nabhani	2	3

Second round
8	(Australia) S Stosur	6	1	6
(Romania) M Niculescu	4	6	3
(Russia) S Kuznetsova	6	6
9	(France) M Bartoli	4	4
16	(United States) S Stephens	6	6^{5}	6^{5}
(Czech Republic) K Zakopalová	4	7^{7}	7^{7}
Q	(France) C Garcia	3	2
3	(Russia) M Sharapova	6	6

Third round
8	(Australia) S Stosur	6	7
(Russia) S Kuznetsova	4	5
(Czech Republic) K Zakopalová	3	3
3	(Russia) M Sharapova	6	6

Quarterfinals
8	(Australia) S Stosur	2	4
3	(Russia) M Sharapova	6	6

==== Section 4 ====
First round
(Spain) C Suárez Navarro	1	2
(Russia) E Makarova	6	6
Q	(Slovenia) T Majerič	4	4
(Chinese Taipei) S-w Hsieh	6	6
(Czech Republic) A Hlaváčková	2	3
11	(Russia) N Petrova	6	6
15	(Italy) R Vinci	6	2
(Belgium) Y Wickmayer	2	1^{r}
(Poland) U Radwańska	6	6
Q	(Ukraine) N Kichenok	1	0
(Spain) A Medina Garrigues	6	3	3
LL	(Russia) D Gavrilova	4	6	6

Second round
7	(Czech Republic) P Kvitová	6	0
(Russia) E Makarova	4	0^{r}
(Chinese Taipei) S-w Hsieh	6	2	4
11	(Russia) N Petrova	3	6	6
15	(Italy) R Vinci	2	7	0
(Poland) U Radwańska	6	5	6
LL	(Russia) D Gavrilova	2	1
2	(United States) S Williams	6	6

Third round
7	(Czech Republic) P Kvitová	4	6	6
11	(Russia) N Petrova	6	4	3
(Poland) U Radwańska	0	3
2	(United States) S Williams	6	6

Quarterfinals
7	(Czech Republic) P Kvitová	6	3	5
2	(United States) S Williams	3	6	7

== Qualifying ==
=== Seeds ===
1. (Kazakhstan) Yulia Putintseva (qualified)
2. (Australia) Anastasia Rodionova (qualified)
3. (China) Zhang Shuai (first round)
4. (Russia) Vera Dushevina (qualified)
5. (Russia) Daria Gavrilova (qualifying completion, lucky loser)
6. (Italy) Maria Elena Camerin (first round)
7. (Russia) Valeria Solovyeva (first round)
8. (France) Caroline Garcia (qualified)
9. (United States) Bethanie Mattek-Sands (qualified)
10. (Slovenia) Tadeja Majerič (qualified)
11. (Germany) Kathrin Wörle (first round)
12. (Ukraine) Lyudmyla Kichenok (first round)
13. (Bosnia and Herzegovina) Mervana Jugić-Salkić (qualifying completion, lucky loser)
14. (Russia) Ekaterina Bychkova (qualified)
15. (Ukraine) Nadiia Kichenok (qualified)
16. (Ukraine) Valentyna Ivakhnenko (qualifying completion)

=== Qualifiers ===
1. (Kazakhstan) Yulia Putintseva
2. (Australia) Anastasia Rodionova
3. (United States) Bethanie Mattek-Sands
4. (Russia) Vera Dushevina
5. (Slovenia) Tadeja Majerič
6. (Ukraine) Nadiia Kichenok
7. (Russia) Ekaterina Bychkova
8. (France) Caroline Garcia

=== Lucky losers ===
1. (Russia) Daria Gavrilova
2. (Bosnia and Herzegovina) Mervana Jugić-Salkić

=== Draw ===
==== First qualifier ====
First round
1	(Kazakhstan) Yulia Putintseva	6	2	7
(Poland) Marta Domachowska	0	6	5
(Ukraine) Irina Buryachok	6	6
12	(Ukraine) Lyudmyla Kichenok	3	0

Qualifying competition
1	(Kazakhstan) Yulia Putintseva	3	6	6
(Ukraine) Irina Buryachok	6	1	4

==== Second qualifier ====
First round
2	(Australia) Anastasia Rodionova	6	6
WC	(Greece) Maria Sakkari	2	2
(Slovakia) Michaela Hončová	6	2	6
11	(Germany) Kathrin Wörle	3	6	4

Qualifying competition
2	(Australia) Anastasia Rodionova	6	6
(Slovakia) Michaela Hončová	2	4

==== Third qualifier ====
First round
3	(China) Zhang Shuai	4	5
(United States) Abigail Spears	6	7
WC	(Slovakia) Janette Husárová	0	0
9	(United States) Bethanie Mattek-Sands	6	6

Qualifying competition
(United States) Abigail Spears	3	4
9	(United States) Bethanie Mattek-Sands	6	6

==== Fourth qualifier ====
First round
4	(Russia) Vera Dushevina	6	6
(Ukraine) Anastasiya Vasylyeva	0	3
WC	(Poland) Justyna Jegiołka	3	1
13	(Bosnia and Herzegovina) Mervana Jugić-Salkić	6	6

Qualifying competition
4	(Russia) Vera Dushevina	6	6
13	(Bosnia and Herzegovina) Mervana Jugić-Salkić	0	1

==== Fifth qualifier ====
First round
5	(Russia) Daria Gavrilova	7^{7}	6
(Germany) Kristina Barrois	6^{5}	2
(Czech Republic) Vladimíra Uhlířová	1	2
10	(Slovenia) Tadeja Majerič	6	6

Qualifying competition
5	(Russia) Daria Gavrilova	2	4
10	(Slovenia) Tadeja Majerič	6	6

==== Sixth qualifier ====
First round
6	(Italy) Maria Elena Camerin	6^{4}	6	4
(Ukraine) Veronika Kapshay	7^{7}	1	6
WC	(United States) Alexandra Riley	0	1
15	(Ukraine) Nadiia Kichenok	6	6

Qualifying competition
(Ukraine) Veronika Kapshay	4	6^{2}
15	(Ukraine) Nadiia Kichenok	6	7^{7}

==== Seventh qualifier ====
First round
7	(Russia) Valeria Solovyeva	3	1
(Kazakhstan) Zarina Diyas	6	6
WC	(Zimbabwe) Cara Black	2	2
14	(Russia) Ekaterina Bychkova	6	6

Qualifying competition
(Kazakhstan) Zarina Diyas	1	3
14	(Russia) Ekaterina Bychkova	6	6

==== Eighth qualifier ====
First round
8	(France) Caroline Garcia	6	6
(South Africa) Natalie Grandin	2	3
(Bulgaria) Aleksandrina Naydenova	1	7^{8}	5
16	(Ukraine) Valentyna Ivakhnenko	6	6^{6}	7

Qualifying competition
8	(France) Caroline Garcia	6	6
16	(Ukraine) Valentyna Ivakhnenko	1	4
