= 2006 Family Circle Cup – Singles =

Singles
- 2006 Family Circle Cup

Final
- Champion: (Russia) Nadia Petrova
- Runner-up: (Switzerland) Patty Schnyder
- Score: 6–3, 4–6, 6–1

Details
- Draw: 56
- Seeds: 16

Events
Singles	Doubles
- Family Circle Cup

Nadia Petrova defeated Patty Schnyder in the final, 6–3, 4–6, 6–1 to win the singles tennis title at the 2006 Family Circle Cup.

Justine Henin-Hardenne was the defending champion, but lost to Schnyder in the semifinals.

== Seeds ==
1. (Belgium) Justine Henin-Hardenne (semifinals)
2. (Russia) Nadia Petrova (champion)
3. (Switzerland) Patty Schnyder (final)
4. (Russia) Svetlana Kuznetsova (quarterfinals)
5. (Czech Republic) Nicole Vaidišová (second round)
6. (Germany) Anna-Lena Grönefeld (semifinals)
7. (Russia) Dinara Safina (quarterfinals)
8. (France) Nathalie Dechy (quarterfinals)
9. (Spain) Anabel Medina Garrigues (third round)
10. (Serbia and Montenegro) Jelena Janković (first round)
11. (Slovenia) Katarina Srebotnik (third round)
12. (France) Marion Bartoli (third round)
13. (Sweden) Sofia Arvidsson (first round)
14. (Czech Republic) Lucie Šafářová (third round)
15. (Czech Republic) Květa Peschke (first round)
16. (Italy) Mara Santangelo (third round)

== Draw ==
Key

- Q = Qualifier
- WC = Wild card
- LL = Lucky loser
- Alt = Alternate
- ITF = ITF entry
- PR = Protected ranking
- SR = Special ranking
- SE = Special exempt
- JE = Junior exempt
- JR = Junior Accelerator Programme entrant
- CO = College Accelerator Programme entrant
- NG = Next Gen Accelerator Program entrant
- w/o = Walkover
- r = Retired
- d = Defaulted

=== Finals ===
Quarterfinals
1	(Belgium) Justine Henin-Hardenne	6	6
7	(Russia) Dinara Safina	4	1
3	(Switzerland) Patty Schnyder	6	6
8	(France) Nathalie Dechy	0	3
6	(Germany) Anna-Lena Grönefeld	6	7
4	(Russia) Svetlana Kuznetsova	3	6^{4}
(Colombia) Catalina Castaño	2	0
2	(Russia) Nadia Petrova	6	6

Semifinals
1	(Belgium) Justine Henin-Hardenne	6	3	2
3	(Switzerland) Patty Schnyder	2	6	6
6	(Germany) Anna-Lena Grönefeld	1	3
2	(Russia) Nadia Petrova	6	6

Final
3	(Switzerland) Patty Schnyder	3	6	1
2	(Russia) Nadia Petrova	6	4	6

=== Top half ===
==== Section 1 ====
First round
(Czech Republic) I Benešová	4	1
(Austria) S Bammer	6	6
Q	(Ukraine) K Bondarenko	5	4
(Croatia) K Šprem	6	7
(United States) J Jackson	6	6
15	(Czech Republic) K Peschke	4	3
10	(Serbia and Montenegro) J Janković	6^{5}	5
Q	(Ukraine) J Vakulenko	7	7
(Venezuela) M Vento-Kabchi	6	5	4
(Italy) A Serra Zanetti	4	7	6
(Russia) E Vesnina	4	7	2
(Russia) V Zvonareva	6	5	6

Second round
1	(Belgium) J Henin-Hardenne	6	6
(Austria) S Bammer	2	3
(Croatia) K Šprem	2	6	6
(United States) J Jackson	6	3	2
Q	(Ukraine) J Vakulenko	6	6
(Italy) A Serra Zanetti	1	2
(Russia) V Zvonareva	5	5
7	(Russia) D Safina	7	7

Third round
1	(Belgium) J Henin-Hardenne	6	6
(Croatia) K Šprem	4	4
Q	(Ukraine) J Vakulenko	7	2	2
7	(Russia) D Safina	6^{6}	6	6

Quarterfinals
1	(Belgium) J Henin-Hardenne	6	6
7	(Russia) D Safina	4	1

==== Section 2 ====
First round
(United States) A Frazier	3	4
Q	(United States) M Tu	6	6
(United States) J Craybas	6	6
(Italy) ME Camerin	4	2
(France) S Foretz	2	4
16	(Italy) M Santangelo	6	6
11	(Slovenia) K Srebotnik	6	6
(France) V Razzano	3	3
(United States) L Granville	4	1
Q	(Slovakia) M Suchá	6	6
WC	(Georgia (country)) A Tatishvili	3	6	7
(Spain) L Pous Tió	6	3	5

Second round
3	(Switzerland) P Schnyder	6	7
Q	(United States) M Tu	4	5
(United States) J Craybas	4	6^{5}
16	(Italy) M Santangelo	6	7
11	(Slovenia) K Srebotnik	7	6
Q	(Slovakia) M Suchá	5	4
WC	(Georgia (country)) A Tatishvili	5	4
8	(France) N Dechy	7	6

Third round
3	(Switzerland) P Schnyder	3	7	6
16	(Italy) M Santangelo	6	6^{2}	3
11	(Slovenia) K Srebotnik	2	3
8	(France) N Dechy	6	6

Quarterfinals
3	(Switzerland) P Schnyder	6	6
8	(France) N Dechy	0	3

=== Bottom half ===
==== Section 3 ====
First round
WC	(United States) S Perry	0	5
(Spain) V Ruano Pascual	6	7
(United States) L Raymond	3	6	1
WC	(United States) N Uberoi	6	3	6
(Argentina) M Díaz Oliva	6	5	2
9	(Spain) A Medina Garrigues	3	7	6
13	(Sweden) S Arvidsson	5	3
(Puerto Rico) K Brandi	7	6
(Ukraine) V Kutuzova	3	5
(Spain) L Domínguez Lino	6	7
WC	(United States) M Shaughnessy	6	6
Q	(Germany) V Henke	3	3

Second round
6	(Germany) AL Grönefeld	6	6
(Spain) V Ruano Pascual	1	4
WC	(United States) N Uberoi	3	4
9	(Spain) A Medina Garrigues	6	6
(Puerto Rico) K Brandi	4	4
(Spain) L Domínguez Lino	6	6
WC	(United States) M Shaughnessy	0	1
4	(Russia) S Kuznetsova	6	6

Third round
6	(Germany) AL Grönefeld	6	6
9	(Spain) A Medina Garrigues	3	4
(Spain) L Domínguez Lino	2	1
4	(Russia) S Kuznetsova	6	6

Quarterfinals
6	(Germany) AL Grönefeld	6	7
4	(Russia) S Kuznetsova	3	6^{4}

==== Section 4 ====
First round
(Colombia) C Castaño	6	6
(United States) A Harkleroad	2	0
Q	(Spain) C Martínez Granados	5	3
Q	(Ukraine) Y Fedak	7	6
(China) S Peng	4	3
12	(France) M Bartoli	6	6
14	(Czech Republic) L Šafářová	5	6	6
(Australia) S Stosur	7	1	4
(Germany) J Schruff	5	6	6
(Japan) S Asagoe	7	2	4
Q	(Ukraine) A Bondarenko	6	7
(Russia) E Bychkova	1	5

Second round
5	(Czech Republic) N Vaidišová	5	2
(Colombia) C Castaño	7	6
Q	(Ukraine) Y Fedak	4	3
12	(France) M Bartoli	6	6
14	(Czech Republic) L Šafářová	6	6
(Germany) J Schruff	4	0
Q	(Ukraine) A Bondarenko	1	6	2
2	(Russia) N Petrova	6	0	6

Third round
(Colombia) C Castaño	5
12	(France) M Bartoli	4^{r}
14	(Czech Republic) L Šafářová	1	3
2	(Russia) N Petrova	6	6

Quarterfinals
(Colombia) C Castaño	2	0
2	(Russia) N Petrova	6	6
