= 2010 BNP Paribas Open – Women's doubles =

Women's doubles
- 2010 BNP Paribas Open

Final
- Champions: (Czech Republic) Květa Peschke (Slovenia) Katarina Srebotnik
- Runners-up: (Russia) Nadia Petrova (Australia) Samantha Stosur
- Score: 6–4, 2–6, [10–5]

Events
Singles	men	women
Doubles	men	women
← 2009 ·	BNP Paribas Open	· 2011 →

Victoria Azarenka and Vera Zvonareva were the defending champions. Azarenka chose not to compete and Zvonareva partnered with Lucie Šafářová.
Zvonareva lost in the first round to the wildcard team of Jelena Janković and Tathiana Garbin.
The unseeded pair Květa Peschke and Katarina Srebotnik won in the final 6–4, 2–6, [10–5], against Nadia Petrova and Samantha Stosur.

== Seeds ==
1. (Zimbabwe) Cara Black / (United States) Liezel Huber (quarterfinals)
2. (Spain) Nuria Llagostera Vives / (Spain) María José Martínez Sánchez (quarterfinals)
3. (Russia) Nadia Petrova / (Australia) Samantha Stosur (final)
4. (United States) Lisa Raymond / (Australia) Rennae Stubbs (first round)
5. (Russia) Alisa Kleybanova / (Italy) Francesca Schiavone (second round)
6. (United States) Bethanie Mattek-Sands / (China) Yan Zi (semifinals)
7. (Chinese Taipei) Chuang Chia-jung / (Chinese Taipei) Hsieh Su-wei (first round)
8. (Russia) Ekaterina Makarova / (China) Peng Shuai (first round)

== Draw ==
=== Key ===
- Q = Qualifier
- WC = Wild card
- LL = Lucky loser
- Alt = Alternate
- SE = Special exempt
- PR = Protected ranking
- ITF = ITF entry
- JE = Junior exempt
- w/o = Walkover
- r = Retired
- d = Defaulted
- SR = Special ranking

=== Finals ===
Semifinals
(Chinese Taipei) Chan Yung-jan (China) Zheng Jie	6	3	[4]
(Czech Republic) Květa Peschke (Slovenia) Katarina Srebotnik	1	6	[10]
3	(Russia) Nadia Petrova (Australia) Samantha Stosur	6	6
6	(United States) Bethanie Mattek-Sands (China) Yan Zi	3	2

Final
(Czech Republic) Květa Peschke (Slovenia) Katarina Srebotnik	6	2	[10]
3	(Russia) Nadia Petrova (Australia) Samantha Stosur	4	6	[5]

=== Top half ===
First round
1	(Zimbabwe) C Black (United States) L Huber	3	6	[11]
(Italy) S Errani (Israel) S Pe'er	6	2	[9]
(Uzbekistan) A Amanmuradova (Belarus) D Kustova	6	1	[10]
(Belarus) O Govortsova (Belarus) T Poutchek	1	6	[5]
(United Kingdom) S Borwell (United States) R Kops-Jones	7	4	[10]
(Spain) A Medina Garrigues (Denmark) C Wozniacki	6^{4}	6	[2]
(Chinese Taipei) Y-j Chan (China) J Zheng	6	6
7	(Chinese Taipei) C-j Chuang (Chinese Taipei) S-w Hsieh	3	3
4	(United States) L Raymond (Australia) R Stubbs	4	6	[3]
(Russia) M Kirilenko (Poland) A Radwańska	6	4	[10]
(Russia) V Dushevina (Australia) A Rodionova	7	3	[10]
(Spain) V Ruano Pascual (United States) M Shaughnessy	5	6	[4]
(Ukraine) A Bondarenko (Kazakhstan) G Voskoboeva	4	1
(Czech Republic) K Peschke (Slovenia) K Srebotnik	6	6
(South Africa) N Grandin (United States) A Spears	6	6
8	(Russia) E Makarova (China) S Peng	0	4

Second round
1	(Zimbabwe) C Black (United States) L Huber	6	6
(Uzbekistan) A Amanmuradova (Belarus) D Kustova	2	2
(United Kingdom) S Borwell (United States) R Kops-Jones	1	2
(Chinese Taipei) Y-j Chan (China) J Zheng	6	6
(Russia) M Kirilenko (Poland) A Radwańska	6	6
(Russia) V Dushevina (Australia) A Rodionova	0	3
(Czech Republic) K Peschke (Slovenia) K Srebotnik	6	6
(South Africa) N Grandin (United States) A Spears	1	2

Quarterfinals
1	(Zimbabwe) C Black (United States) L Huber	6^{5}	2
(Chinese Taipei) Y-j Chan (China) J Zheng	7	6
(Russia) M Kirilenko (Poland) A Radwańska	6	6^{4}	[5]
(Czech Republic) K Peschke (Slovenia) K Srebotnik	4	7	[10]

Semifinals
(Chinese Taipei) Y-j Chan (China) J Zheng	6	3	[4]
(Czech Republic) K Peschke (Slovenia) K Srebotnik	1	6	[10]

=== Bottom half ===
First round
5	(Russia) A Kleybanova (Italy) F Schiavone	6	7
WC	(United States) M Oudin (United States) S Perry	4	5
(Poland) K Jans (Poland) A Rosolska	4	3
(Czech Republic) I Benešová (Czech Republic) B Záhlavová-Strýcová	6	6
(Czech Republic) A Hlaváčková (Czech Republic) L Hradecká	6	7
(Ukraine) M Koryttseva (Kazakhstan) Y Shvedova	3	6^{5}
ALT	(France) J Coin (Canada) M-È Pelletier	4	2
3	(Russia) N Petrova (Australia) S Stosur	6	6
6	(United States) B Mattek-Sands (China) Z Yan	7	6
(Netherlands) M Krajicek (Romania) M Niculescu	6^{2}	2
WC	(Czech Republic) L Šafářová (Russia) V Zvonareva	6^{4}	3
WC	(Italy) T Garbin (Serbia) J Janković	7	6
(Argentina) G Dulko (Italy) F Pennetta	1	6	[10]
(Czech Republic) V Uhlířová (Czech Republic) R Voráčová	6	4	[5]
(Latvia) L Dekmeijere (Switzerland) P Schnyder	2	4
2	(Spain) N Llagostera Vives (Spain) MJ Martínez Sánchez	6	6

Second round
5	(Russia) A Kleybanova (Italy) F Schiavone	7	5	[1]
(Czech Republic) I Benešová (Czech Republic) B Záhlavová-Strýcová	5	7	[10]
(Czech Republic) A Hlaváčková (Czech Republic) L Hradecká	4	0
3	(Russia) N Petrova (Australia) S Stosur	6	6
6	(United States) B Mattek-Sands (China) Z Yan	6	4	[10]
WC	(Italy) T Garbin (Serbia) J Janković	4	6	[5]
(Argentina) G Dulko (Italy) F Pennetta	5	6^{4}
2	(Spain) N Llagostera Vives (Spain) MJ Martínez Sánchez	7	7

Quarterfinals
(Czech Republic) I Benešová (Czech Republic) B Záhlavová-Strýcová	6	2	[7]
3	(Russia) N Petrova (Australia) S Stosur	2	6	[10]
6	(United States) B Mattek-Sands (China) Z Yan	7	1	[10]
2	(Spain) N Llagostera Vives (Spain) MJ Martínez Sánchez	6^{3}	6	[4]

Semifinals
3	(Russia) N Petrova (Australia) S Stosur	6	6
6	(United States) B Mattek-Sands (China) Z Yan	3	2
