= 2004 Ladies German Open – Doubles =

Doubles
- 2004 Ladies German Open

Final
- Champions: (Russia) Nadia Petrova (United States) Meghann Shaughnessy
- Runners-up: (Slovakia) Janette Husárová (Spain) Conchita Martínez
- Score: 6–2, 2–6, 6–1

Details
- Draw: 28
- Seeds: 8

Events
Singles	Doubles
← 2003 ·	WTA German Open	· 2005 →

Virginia Ruano Pascual and Paola Suárez were the defending champions, but lost in semifinals to Nadia Petrova and Meghann Shaughnessy. The latter pair eventually won the title, by defeating Janette Husárová and Conchita Martínez 6–2, 2–6, 6–1 in the final.

It was the 7th doubles title for both Petrova and Shaughnessy in their respective careers. It was also the 3rd title for the pair during this season, after their wins in Miami and Amelia Island.

== Seeds ==
The first four seeds received a bye into the second round.

1. (Spain) Virginia Ruano Pascual / (Argentina) Paola Suárez (semifinals)
2. (Russia) Svetlana Kuznetsova / (Russia) Elena Likhovtseva (second round)
3. (Zimbabwe) Cara Black / (South Africa) Liezel Huber (quarterfinals)
4. (Russia) Nadia Petrova / (United States) Meghann Shaughnessy (champions)
5. (Slovakia) Janette Husárová / (Spain) Conchita Martínez (final)
6. (Belgium) Els Callens / (Hungary) Petra Mandula (second round, withdrew due to a right shoulder strain on Mandula)
7. (China) Li Ting / (China) Sun Tiantian (first round)
8. (Greece) ~~Eleni Daniilidou~~ / (Venezuela) ~~María Vento-Kabchi~~ (withdrew)
9. (Austria) Barbara Schett / (Switzerland) Patty Schnyder (first round)

== Draw ==
=== Key ===
- Q = Qualifier
- WC = Wild card
- LL = Lucky loser
- Alt = Alternate
- SE = Special exempt
- PR = Protected ranking
- ITF = ITF entry
- JE = Junior exempt
- w/o = Walkover
- r = Retired
- d = Defaulted
- SR = Special ranking

=== Finals ===
Semifinals
1	(Spain) Virginia Ruano Pascual (Argentina) Paola Suárez	1	2
4	(Russia) Nadia Petrova (United States) Meghann Shaughnessy	6	6
(Russia) Anastasia Myskina (Russia) Vera Zvonareva	6	3	4
5	(Slovakia) Janette Husárová (Spain) Conchita Martínez	3	6	6

Final
4	(Russia) Nadia Petrova (United States) Meghann Shaughnessy	6	2	6
5	(Slovakia) Janette Husárová (Spain) Conchita Martínez	2	6	1

=== Top half ===
First round
PR	(Czech Republic) K Peschke (Germany) B Rittner	7^{7}	7^{9}
WC	(Russia) E Dementieva (Croatia) K Šprem	6^{2}	6^{7}
(Australia) N Pratt (Russia) M Sharapova	7	6
(Argentina) P Tarabini (United States) M Tu	5	3
(Russia) E Bovina (Czech Republic) D Chládková	3	6^{6}
6	(Belgium) E Callens (Hungary) P Mandula	6	7^{8}
Q	(Australia) B Stewart (Australia) S Stosur	0	6	6
(Slovakia) D Hantuchová (Russia) D Safina	6	1	4
(France) C Dhenin (Spain) A Parra Santonja	6	5	0
(Estonia) M Ani (Switzerland) E Gagliardi	2	7	6
(China) Z Yan (China) J Zheng	2	6	6
9	(Austria) B Schett (Switzerland) P Schnyder	6	4	2

Second round
1	(Spain) V Ruano Pascual (Argentina) P Suárez	6	6
PR	(Czech Republic) K Peschke (Germany) B Rittner	2	2
(Australia) N Pratt (Russia) M Sharapova	w/o
6	(Belgium) E Callens (Hungary) P Mandula
4	(Russia) N Petrova (United States) M Shaughnessy	6	4	6
Q	(Australia) B Stewart (Australia) S Stosur	2	6	3
(Estonia) M Ani (Switzerland) E Gagliardi	5	6	0
(China) Z Yan (China) J Zheng	7	3	6

Quarterfinals
1	(Spain) V Ruano Pascual (Argentina) P Suárez	6	6
(Australia) N Pratt (Russia) M Sharapova	2	2
4	(Russia) N Petrova (United States) M Shaughnessy	2	6	7
(China) Z Yan (China) J Zheng	6	1	5

Semifinals
1	(Spain) V Ruano Pascual (Argentina) P Suárez	1	2
4	(Russia) N Petrova (United States) M Shaughnessy	6	6

=== Bottom half ===
First round
7	(China) T Li (China) T Sun	4	4
(Russia) A Myskina (Russia) V Zvonareva	6	6
(Slovenia) T Križan (Slovenia) K Srebotnik	2	6	1
(Croatia) J Kostanić (Ukraine) E Tatarkova	6	4	6
PR	(France) S Testud (Italy) R Vinci	7^{7}	7
LL	(Czech Republic) I Benešová (Czech Republic) M Paštiková	6^{1}	5
5	(Slovakia) J Husárová (Spain) C Martínez	6	6
(Ukraine) T Perebiynis (Croatia) S Talaja	3	0
WC	(Germany) AL Grönefeld (Germany) A Roesch	6	1	1
(Argentina) G Dulko (Italy) R Grande	4	6	6
(Italy) T Garbin (Russia) A Jidkova	4	1
WC	(France) M Pierce (Spain) A Sánchez Vicario	6	6

Second round
(Russia) A Myskina (Russia) V Zvonareva	6	6
(Croatia) J Kostanić (Ukraine) E Tatarkova	2	4
PR	(France) S Testud (Italy) R Vinci	4	4
3	(Zimbabwe) C Black (South Africa) L Huber	6	6
5	(Slovakia) J Husárová (Spain) C Martínez	7^{7}	6
(Argentina) G Dulko (Italy) R Grande	6^{4}	0
WC	(France) M Pierce (Spain) A Sánchez Vicario	2	7^{7}	6
2	(Russia) S Kuznetsova (Russia) E Likhovtseva	6	6^{3}	4

Quarterfinals
(Russia) A Myskina (Russia) V Zvonareva	6	6
3	(Zimbabwe) C Black (South Africa) L Huber	1	0
5	(Slovakia) J Husárová (Spain) C Martínez	6	6
WC	(France) M Pierce (Spain) A Sánchez Vicario	2	4

Semifinals
(Russia) A Myskina (Russia) V Zvonareva	6	3	4
5	(Slovakia) J Husárová (Spain) C Martínez	3	6	6
