= 2013 Qatar Total Open – Doubles =

Doubles
- 2013 Qatar Total Open

Final
- Champions: (Italy) Sara Errani (Italy) Roberta Vinci
- Runners-up: (Russia) Nadia Petrova (Slovenia) Katarina Srebotnik
- Score: 2–6, 6–3, [10–6]

Events
Singles	Doubles
← 2012 ·	Qatar Total Open	· 2014 →

Liezel Huber and Lisa Raymond were the defending champions but decided not to participate together this year.
Huber played alongside Hsieh Su-wei, but lost to Daniela Hantuchová and Anabel Medina Garrigues in the first round while Raymond partnered up with Samantha Stosur, but lost to Raquel Kops-Jones and Abigail Spears in the quarterfinals.
Sara Errani and Roberta Vinci won the title, defeating Nadia Petrova and Katarina Srebotnik in the final 2–6, 6–3, [10–6].

== Seeds ==
The first four seeds received byes into the second round.

1. (Italy) Sara Errani / (Italy) Roberta Vinci (champions)
2. (Russia) Nadia Petrova / (Slovenia) Katarina Srebotnik (final)
3. (United States) Raquel Kops-Jones / (United States) Abigail Spears (semifinals)
4. (Spain) Nuria Llagostera Vives / (China) Zheng Jie (quarterfinals)
5. (Chinese Taipei) Hsieh Su-wei / (United States) Liezel Huber (first round)
6. (Germany) Anna-Lena Grönefeld / (Czech Republic) Květa Peschke (semifinals)
7. (Czech Republic) Andrea Hlaváčková / (Czech Republic) Lucie Šafářová (quarterfinals)
8. (United States) Bethanie Mattek-Sands / (India) Sania Mirza (first round)

== Draw ==
=== Key ===
- Q = Qualifier
- WC = Wild card
- LL = Lucky loser
- Alt = Alternate
- SE = Special exempt
- PR = Protected ranking
- ITF = ITF entry
- JE = Junior exempt
- w/o = Walkover
- r = Retired
- d = Defaulted
- SR = Special ranking

=== Finals ===
Semifinals
1	(Italy) Sara Errani (Italy) Roberta Vinci	1	7^{7}	[11]
6	(Germany) Anna-Lena Grönefeld (Czech Republic) Květa Peschke	6	6^{3}	[9]
3	(United States) Raquel Kops-Jones (United States) Abigail Spears	6	3	[10]
2	(Russia) Nadia Petrova (Slovenia) Katarina Srebotnik	3	6	[12]

Final
1	(Italy) Sara Errani (Italy) Roberta Vinci	2	6	[10]
2	(Russia) Nadia Petrova (Slovenia) Katarina Srebotnik	6	3	[6]

=== Top half ===
First round
Alt	(Ukraine) L Kichenok (Ukraine) N Kichenok	3	1
(Germany) K Barrois (Greece) E Daniilidou	6	6
(Russia) V Dushevina (Serbia) J Janković	3	5
WC	(France) C Garcia (United States) C McHale	6	7
(Slovakia) D Hantuchová (Spain) A Medina Garrigues	6	6
5	(Chinese Taipei) S-w Hsieh (United States) L Huber	2	3
(Bosnia and Herzegovina) M Jugić-Salkić (Austria) S Klemenschits	3	1
WC	(Bulgaria) A Naydenova (Italy) F Schiavone	6	6
(Croatia) D Jurak (Hungary) K Marosi	6	6
(Ukraine) I Buryachok (Russia) V Solovyeva	2	2
(Poland) A Rosolska (Spain) C Suárez Navarro	1	4
6	(Germany) A-L Grönefeld (Czech Republic) K Peschke	6	6

Second round
1	(Italy) S Errani (Italy) R Vinci	6	6
(Germany) K Barrois (Greece) E Daniilidou	2	2
WC	(France) C Garcia (United States) C McHale	1	2
(Slovakia) D Hantuchová (Spain) A Medina Garrigues	6	6
4	(Spain) N Llagostera Vives (China) J Zheng	7	6
WC	(Bulgaria) A Naydenova (Italy) F Schiavone	5	0
(Croatia) D Jurak (Hungary) K Marosi	6	5	[6]
6	(Germany) A-L Grönefeld (Czech Republic) K Peschke	1	7	[10]

Quarterfinals
1	(Italy) S Errani (Italy) R Vinci	6	4	[13]
(Slovakia) D Hantuchová (Spain) A Medina Garrigues	3	6	[11]
4	(Spain) N Llagostera Vives (China) J Zheng	3	0
6	(Germany) A-L Grönefeld (Czech Republic) K Peschke	6	6

Semifinals
1	(Italy) S Errani (Italy) R Vinci	1	7^{7}	[11]
6	(Germany) A-L Grönefeld (Czech Republic) K Peschke	6	6^{3}	[9]

=== Bottom half ===
First round
8	(United States) B Mattek-Sands (India) S Mirza	4	2
(United States) L Raymond (Australia) S Stosur	6	6
(South Africa) N Grandin (Czech Republic) V Uhlířová	3	6	[7]
(Slovakia) J Husárová (China) S Zhang	6	2	[10]
Alt	(Poland) J Jegiołka (Ukraine) V Kapshay	6^{4}	4
(Japan) S Aoyama (United States) M Moulton-Levy	7^{7}	6
7	(Czech Republic) A Hlaváčková (Czech Republic) L Šafářová	6	6
(Belarus) O Govortsova (Slovenia) A Klepač	2	4
WC	(Oman) F Al Nabhani (Germany) K Wörle	2	4
(Zimbabwe) C Black (Australia) A Rodionova	6	6
Alt	(Italy) ME Camerin (Romania) S Halep	2	2
(Austria) T Paszek (Czech Republic) K Zakopalová	6	6

Second round
(United States) L Raymond (Australia) S Stosur	6	4	[10]
(Slovakia) J Husárová (China) S Zhang	4	6	[6]
(Japan) S Aoyama (United States) M Moulton-Levy	2	6	[5]
3	(United States) R Kops-Jones (United States) A Spears	6	4	[10]
7	(Czech Republic) A Hlaváčková (Czech Republic) L Šafářová	6	3	[10]
(Zimbabwe) C Black (Australia) A Rodionova	3	6	[5]
(Austria) T Paszek (Czech Republic) K Zakopalová	3	2
2	(Russia) N Petrova (Slovenia) K Srebotnik	6	6

Quarterfinals
(United States) L Raymond (Australia) S Stosur	2	4
3	(United States) R Kops-Jones (United States) A Spears	6	6
7	(Czech Republic) A Hlaváčková (Czech Republic) L Šafářová	1	1
2	(Russia) N Petrova (Slovenia) K Srebotnik	6	6

Semifinals
3	(United States) R Kops-Jones (United States) A Spears	6	3	[10]
2	(Russia) N Petrova (Slovenia) K Srebotnik	3	6	[12]
