= 2006 Qatar Telecom German Open – Singles =

Singles
- 2006 Qatar Telecom German Open

Final
- Champion: (Russia) Nadia Petrova
- Runner-up: (Belgium) Justine Henin-Hardenne
- Score: 4–6, 6–4, 7–5

Details
- Draw: 56
- Seeds: 16

Events
Singles	Doubles
- WTA German Open

Nadia Petrova defeated the defending champion Justine Henin-Hardenne in the final, 4–6, 6–4, 7–5 to win the singles tennis title at the 2006 WTA German Open. This was the third consecutive title for Petrova over a span of a month, extending her winning streak to a career-high 15 matches.

== Seeds ==
1. (France) Amélie Mauresmo (semifinals)
2. (Russia) Nadia Petrova (champion)
3. (Belgium) Justine Henin-Hardenne (final)
4. (Switzerland) Patty Schnyder (quarterfinals)
5. (Russia) Elena Dementieva (third round)
6. (Russia) Svetlana Kuznetsova (quarterfinals)
7. (Germany) Anna-Lena Grönefeld (second round)
8. (Slovakia) Daniela Hantuchová (third round)
9. (Russia) Elena Likhovtseva (first round)
10. (Russia) Dinara Safina (quarterfinals)
11. (Italy) Flavia Pennetta (first round)
12. (Serbia and Montenegro) Ana Ivanovic (first round)
13. (France) Nathalie Dechy (first round)
14. (Japan) Ai Sugiyama (first round)
15. (Russia) Maria Kirilenko (third round)
16. (Spain) Anabel Medina Garrigues (second round)

== Draw ==
Key

- Q = Qualifier
- WC = Wild card
- LL = Lucky loser
- Alt = Alternate
- ITF = ITF entry
- PR = Protected ranking
- SR = Special ranking
- SE = Special exempt
- JE = Junior exempt
- JR = Junior Accelerator Programme entrant
- CO = College Accelerator Programme entrant
- NG = Next Gen Accelerator Program entrant
- w/o = Walkover
- r = Retired
- d = Defaulted

=== Finals ===
Quarterfinals
1	(France) Amélie Mauresmo	4	6	6
(Switzerland) Martina Hingis	6	4	4
3	(Belgium) Justine Henin-Hardenne	6	7
6	(Russia) Svetlana Kuznetsova	4	6^{2}
(China) Li Na	2	7	7
4	(Switzerland) Patty Schnyder	6	6^{3}	6^{1}
10	(Russia) Dinara Safina	6	4	3
2	(Russia) Nadia Petrova	3	6	6

Semifinals
1	(France) Amélie Mauresmo	1	2
3	(Belgium) Justine Henin-Hardenne	6	6
(China) Li Na	1	0
2	(Russia) Nadia Petrova	6	6

Final
3	(Belgium) Justine Henin-Hardenne	6	4	5
2	(Russia) Nadia Petrova	4	6	7

=== Top half ===
==== Section 1 ====
First round
Q	(Italy) T Garbin	6	6^{3}	2
(Russia) V Dushevina	2	7	6
(Czech Republic) I Benešová	1	3
(Russia) A Chakvetadze	6	6
Q	(Russia) T Panova	1	2
16	(Spain) A Medina Garrigues	6	6
11	(Italy) F Pennetta	5	3
(Switzerland) M Hingis	7	6
(Finland) E Laine	1	4
(Germany) J Schruff	6	6
Q	(Ukraine) J Vakulenko	6	6
(Poland) M Domachowska	4	3

Second round
1	(France) A Mauresmo	6	6
(Russia) V Dushevina	1	2
(Russia) A Chakvetadze	6	6
(Spain) A Medina Garrigues	3	4
(Switzerland) M Hingis	6	6
(Germany) J Schruff	4	3
Q	(Ukraine) J Vakulenko	2	0^{r}
5	(Russia) E Dementieva	6	3

Third round
1	(France) A Mauresmo	6	6
(Russia) A Chakvetadze	4	2
(Switzerland) M Hingis	6	6
5	(Russia) E Dementieva	3	2

Quarterfinals
1	(France) A Mauresmo	4	6	6
(Switzerland) M Hingis	6	4	4

==== Section 2 ====
First round
WC	(Germany) S Lisicki	6	2	1
(Italy) M Santangelo	3	6	6
(Greece) E Daniilidou	5	5
(Czech Republic) K Koukalová	7	7
(Italy) R Vinci	4	3
15	(Russia) M Kirilenko	6	6
9	(Russia) E Likhovtseva	4	3
Q	(Spain) L Pous Tió	6	6
(Netherlands) M Krajicek	3	2
(Austria) S Bammer	6	6
WC	(Germany) M Müller	1	6	6
(United States) J Craybas	6	2	2

Second round
3	(Belgium) J Henin-Hardenne	6	6
(Italy) M Santangelo	4	1
(Czech Republic) K Koukalová	4	3
15	(Russia) M Kirilenko	6	6
Q	(Spain) L Pous Tió	4	6	5
(Austria) S Bammer	6	4	7
WC	(Germany) M Müller	3	6	0
6	(Russia) S Kuznetsova	6	3	6

Third round
3	(Belgium) J Henin-Hardenne	6	6
15	(Russia) M Kirilenko	1	0
(Austria) S Bammer	2	4
6	(Russia) S Kuznetsova	6	6

Quarterfinals
3	(Belgium) J Henin-Hardenne	6	7
6	(Russia) S Kuznetsova	4	6^{2}

=== Bottom half ===
==== Section 3 ====
First round
WC	(Germany) S Klösel	6	1	1
(Colombia) C Castaño	2	6	6
Q	(Italy) N Viérin	6	6
(Sweden) S Arvidsson	2	2
(China) N Li	1
12	(Serbia and Montenegro) A Ivanovic	6	^{r}
14	(Japan) A Sugiyama	1	6	2
(France) V Razzano	6	4	6
(Russia) E Bychkova	4	6	4
(Israel) A Smashnova	6	4	6
(Estonia) M Ani	6^{9}	6	6
(Argentina) P Suárez	7	2	0

Second round
7	(Germany) AL Grönefeld	3	6	3
(Colombia) C Castaño	6	2	6
Q	(Italy) N Viérin	1	0
(China) N Li	6	6
(France) V Razzano	6	5	3
(Israel) A Smashnova	4	7	6
WC	(Estonia) M Ani	1	4
4	(Switzerland) P Schnyder	6	6

Third round
(Colombia) C Castaño	1	0
(China) N Li	6	6
(Israel) A Smashnova	3	3
4	(Switzerland) P Schnyder	6	6

Quarterfinals
(China) N Li	2	7	7
4	(Switzerland) P Schnyder	6	6^{3}	6^{1}

==== Section 4 ====
First round
(Slovenia) K Srebotnik	1	6	6
(Serbia and Montenegro) J Janković	6	3	2
(Czech Republic) K Peschke	6	6
Q	(Russia) E Vesnina	4	3
(Spain) M Sánchez Lorenzo	1	4
10	(Russia) D Safina	6	6
13	(France) N Dechy	6^{4}	2
(China) J Zheng	7	6
Q	(Croatia) I Lisjak	6	7
Q	(Luxembourg) A Kremer	0	6^{4}
(Russia) V Zvonareva	3	6	6
(Argentina) G Dulko	6	2	2

Second round
8	(Slovakia) D Hantuchová	6	0	6
(Slovenia) K Srebotnik	4	6	1
(Czech Republic) K Peschke	1	4
10	(Russia) D Safina	6	6
(China) J Zheng	7	6
Q	(Croatia) I Lisjak	6^{4}	3
Q	(Russia) V Zvonareva	1	6^{3}
2	(Russia) N Petrova	6	7

Third round
8	(Slovakia) D Hantuchová	3	2
10	(Russia) D Safina	6	6
(China) J Zheng	6^{3}	6	4
2	(Russia) N Petrova	7	4	6

Quarterfinals
10	(Russia) D Safina	6	4	3
2	(Russia) N Petrova	3	6	6

== Qualifying ==
=== Seeds ===
1. (Russia) Elena Vesnina (qualified)
2. (Italy) Tathiana Garbin (qualified)
3. (China) Yan Zi (first round)
4. (Bulgaria) Tsvetana Pironkova (second round)
5. (Slovakia) Jarmila Gajdošová (second round)
6. (China) Yuan Meng (second round)
7. (Spain) Laura Pous Tió (qualified)
8. (France) Camille Pin (first round)
9. (China) Sun Tiantian (first round)
10. (Russia) Anastassia Rodionova (first round)
11. (Czech Republic) Hana Šromová (first round)
12. (Ukraine) Kateryna Bondarenko (first round)
13. (Argentina) María Emilia Salerni (first round)
14. (United States) Meilen Tu (first round)
15. (Croatia) Ivana Lisjak (qualified)
16. (Italy) Nathalie Viérin (qualified)

=== Qualifiers ===
1. (Russia) Elena Vesnina
2. (Italy) Tathiana Garbin
3. (Croatia) Ivana Lisjak
4. (Luxembourg) Anne Kremer
5. (Ukraine) Julia Vakulenko
6. (Italy) Nathalie Viérin
7. (Spain) Laura Pous Tió
8. (Russia) Tatiana Panova

=== Qualifying draw ===
==== First qualifier ====
First round
1	(Russia) Elena Vesnina	6	6
(Hungary) Kyra Nagy	1	1
WC	(Germany) Andrea Petkovic	1	7	6
12	(Ukraine) Kateryna Bondarenko	6	5	1

Qualifying competition
1	(Russia) Elena Vesnina	6	6
12	(Ukraine) Kateryna Bondarenko	2	4

==== Second qualifier ====
First round
2	(Italy) Tathiana Garbin	6	6
(France) Séverine Brémond	4	2
(France) Stéphanie Cohen-Aloro	3	6	6
9	(China) Sun Tiantian	6	1	0

Qualifying competition
2	(Italy) Tathiana Garbin	6	6
(France) Stéphanie Cohen-Aloro	0	1

==== Third qualifier ====
First round
3	(China) Yan Zi	7	0	1
(Germany) Kathrin Wörle	5	6	6
(Germany) Vanessa Henke	6^{2}	4
15	(Croatia) Ivana Lisjak	7	6

Qualifying competition
(Germany) Kathrin Wörle	1	2
15	(Croatia) Ivana Lisjak	6	6

==== Fourth qualifier ====
First round
4	(Bulgaria) Tsvetana Pironkova	6	7
WC	(Germany) Angelika Rösch	2	5
WC	(Luxembourg) Anne Kremer	6	6
10	(Russia) Anastasia Rodionova	1	3

Qualifying competition
4	(Bulgaria) Tsvetana Pironkova	4	5
(Luxembourg) Anne Kremer	6	7

==== Fifth qualifier ====
First round
5	(Slovakia) Jarmila Gajdošová	6	6
(Germany) Laura Siegemund	4	4
(Ukraine) Julia Vakulenko	6^{4}	6	6
13	(Argentina) María Emilia Salerni	7	3	1

Qualifying competition
5	(Slovakia) Jarmila Gajdošová	6	6^{5}	3
(Ukraine) Julia Vakulenko	3	7	6

==== Sixth qualifier ====
First round
6	(China) Yuan Meng	6^{6}	6	6
(Germany) Angelika Bachmann	7	3	2
(Slovakia) Ľudmila Cervanová	3	1
16	(Italy) Nathalie Viérin	6	6

Qualifying competition
6	(China) Yuan Meng	5	1
16	(Italy) Nathalie Viérin	7	6

==== Seventh qualifier ====
First round
7	(Spain) Laura Pous Tió	6	6
WC	(Germany) Tatjana Malek	1	2
(Russia) Galina Voskoboeva	6	7
14	(United States) Meilen Tu	1	6^{5}

Qualifying competition
7	(Spain) Laura Pous Tió	6	6
(Russia) Galina Voskoboeva	2	3

==== Eighth qualifier ====
First round
8	(France) Camille Pin	6	1	4
(Russia) Tatiana Panova	2	6	6
(China) Li Ting	6	7
11	(Czech Republic) Hana Šromová	3	6^{1}

Qualifying competition
(Russia) Tatiana Panova	7	1	2
(China) Li Ting	6^{8}	6	6
