= 2014 Qatar Total Open – Doubles =

Doubles
- 2014 Qatar Total Open

Final
- Champions: (Chinese Taipei) Hsieh Su-wei (China) Peng Shuai
- Runners-up: (Czech Republic) Květa Peschke (Slovenia) Katarina Srebotnik
- Score: 6–4, 6–0

Events
Singles	Doubles
← 2013 ·	Qatar Total Open	· 2015 →

Sara Errani and Roberta Vinci were the defending champions, but lost in the semifinals to Květa Peschke and Katarina Srebotnik.
Hsieh Su-wei and Peng Shuai won the title, defeating Peschke and Srebotnik in the final, 6–4, 6–0. By winning her second round match, Peng replaced Errani and Vinci as the world No. 1 in doubles.

== Seeds ==
1. (Italy) Sara Errani / (Italy) Roberta Vinci (semifinals)
2. (Chinese Taipei) Hsieh Su-wei / (China) Peng Shuai (champions)
3. (Czech Republic) Květa Peschke / (Slovenia) Katarina Srebotnik (final)
4. (Zimbabwe) Cara Black / (India) Sania Mirza (quarterfinals)
5. (Czech Republic) Andrea Hlaváčková / (Czech Republic) Lucie Šafářová (first round)
6. (United States) Raquel Kops-Jones / (United States) Abigail Spears (second round)
7. (Russia) Nadia Petrova / (Russia) Anastasia Pavlyuchenkova (semifinals)
8. (France) Kristina Mladenovic / (Italy) Flavia Pennetta (first round)

== Draw ==
=== Key ===
- Q = Qualifier
- WC = Wild card
- LL = Lucky loser
- Alt = Alternate
- SE = Special exempt
- PR = Protected ranking
- ITF = ITF entry
- JE = Junior exempt
- w/o = Walkover
- r = Retired
- d = Defaulted
- SR = Special ranking

=== Finals ===
Semifinals
1	(Italy) Sara Errani (Italy) Roberta Vinci	2	6	[7]
3	(Czech Republic) Květa Peschke (Slovenia) Katarina Srebotnik	6	3	[10]
7	(Russia) Anastasia Pavlyuchenkova (Russia) Nadia Petrova	3	2
2	(Chinese Taipei) Hsieh Su-wei (China) Peng Shuai	6	6

Final
3	(Czech Republic) Květa Peschke (Slovenia) Katarina Srebotnik	4	0
2	(Chinese Taipei) Hsieh Su-wei (China) Peng Shuai	6	6

=== Top half ===
First round
(Slovakia) J Husárová (Poland) A Rosolska	2	4
(United States) L Raymond (China) S Zhang	6	6
(United States) V Lepchenko (Russia) A Panova	6^{5}	6	[2]
WC	(Serbia) J Janković (Russia) A Kleybanova	7^{7}	0	[10]
(Germany) M Barthel (United States) M Moulton-Levy	4	6^{5}
6	(United States) R Kops-Jones (United States) A Spears	6	7^{7}
(Germany) K Barrois (France) L Thorpe	6^{5}	6^{7}
(France) C Garcia (Georgia (country)) O Kalashnikova	7^{7}	7^{9}
(Croatia) D Jurak (Slovenia) A Klepač	6	6
WC	(Belgium) K Flipkens (Italy) F Schiavone	4	3
(Russia) A Kudryavtseva (Australia) A Rodionova	6	6
5	(Czech Republic) A Hlaváčková (Czech Republic) L Šafářová	4	1

Second round
1	(Italy) S Errani (Italy) R Vinci	6	7^{8}
(United States) L Raymond (China) S Zhang	4	6^{6}
WC	(Serbia) J Janković (Russia) A Kleybanova	6	6
6	(United States) R Kops-Jones (United States) A Spears	4	4
3	(Czech Republic) K Peschke (Slovenia) K Srebotnik	7^{7}	7^{8}
(France) C Garcia (Georgia (country)) O Kalashnikova	6^{1}	6^{6}
(Croatia) D Jurak (Slovenia) A Klepač	3	4
(Russia) A Kudryavtseva (Australia) A Rodionova	6	6

Quarterfinals
1	(Italy) S Errani (Italy) R Vinci	4	6	[15]
WC	(Serbia) J Janković (Russia) A Kleybanova	6	2	[13]
3	(Czech Republic) K Peschke (Slovenia) K Srebotnik	7	6
(Russia) A Kudryavtseva (Australia) A Rodionova	5	2

Semifinals
1	(Italy) S Errani (Italy) R Vinci	2	6	[7]
3	(Czech Republic) K Peschke (Slovenia) K Srebotnik	6	3	[10]

=== Bottom half ===
First round
7	(Russia) A Pavlyuchenkova (Russia) N Petrova	3	6	[10]
WC	(Ukraine) Y Beygelzimer (Ukraine) O Savchuk	6	4	[5]
(New Zealand) M Erakovic (Croatia) P Martić	2	6	[6]
(Germany) A-L Grönefeld (Croatia) M Lučić-Baroni	6	4	[10]
WC	(Oman) F Al Nabhani (Slovakia) M Hončová	3	2
(Czech Republic) Ka Plíšková (Czech Republic) Kr Plíšková	6	6
8	(France) K Mladenovic (Italy) F Pennetta	6	4	[2]
(Romania) M Niculescu (Czech Republic) K Zakopalová	4	6	[10]
(Chinese Taipei) H-c Chan (United States) L Huber	6	6
(Austria) S Klemenschits (Romania) R Olaru	2	3
(Russia) V Dushevina (Spain) A Parra Santonja	3	6	[3]
(Ukraine) I Buryachok (Russia) V Diatchenko	6	2	[10]

Second round
7	(Russia) A Pavlyuchenkova (Russia) N Petrova	w/o
(Germany) A-L Grönefeld (Croatia) M Lučić-Baroni
(Czech Republic) Ka Plíšková (Czech Republic) Kr Plíšková	6	2	[4]
4	(Zimbabwe) C Black (India) S Mirza	4	6	[10]
(Romania) M Niculescu (Czech Republic) K Zakopalová	6	6
(Chinese Taipei) H-c Chan (United States) L Huber	3	3
(Ukraine) I Buryachok (Russia) V Diatchenko	2	4
2	(Chinese Taipei) S-w Hsieh (China) S Peng	6	6

Quarterfinals
7	(Russia) A Pavlyuchenkova (Russia) N Petrova	4	6	[14]
4	(Zimbabwe) C Black (India) S Mirza	6	4	[12]
(Romania) M Niculescu (Czech Republic) K Zakopalová	1	1
2	(Chinese Taipei) S-w Hsieh (China) S Peng	6	6

Semifinals
7	(Russia) A Pavlyuchenkova (Russia) N Petrova	3	2
2	(Chinese Taipei) S-w Hsieh (China) S Peng	6	6
