= 2010 BNP Paribas Open – Women's singles =

Women's singles
- 2010 BNP Paribas Open

Final
- Champion: (Serbia) Jelena Janković
- Runner-up: (Denmark) Caroline Wozniacki
- Score: 6–2, 6–4

Details
- Draw: 96
- Seeds: 32

Events
Singles	men	women
Doubles	men	women
← 2009 ·	BNP Paribas Open	· 2011 →

Jelena Janković defeated Caroline Wozniacki in the final, 6–2, 6–4 to win the women's singles tennis title at the 2010 Indian Wells Masters.

Vera Zvonareva was the defending champion, but lost in the fourth round to Samantha Stosur.

This tournament marked the first WTA Tour main draw appearance of future World No. 3 and US Open Champion Sloane Stephens, who advanced to the second round before losing to Zvonareva.

== Seeds ==
All seeds receive a bye into the second round.

1. (Russia) Svetlana Kuznetsova (second round)
2. (Denmark) Caroline Wozniacki (final)
3. (Belarus) Victoria Azarenka (third round)
4. (Russia) Elena Dementieva (quarterfinals)
5. (Poland) Agnieszka Radwańska (semifinals)
6. (Serbia) Jelena Janković (champion)
7. (China) Li Na (second round)
8. (Australia) Samantha Stosur (semifinals)
9. (Italy) Flavia Pennetta (third round)
10. (Russia) Maria Sharapova (third round)
11. (France) Marion Bartoli (fourth round)
12. (Russia) Vera Zvonareva (fourth round)
13. (Belgium) Yanina Wickmayer (fourth round)
14. (Belgium) Kim Clijsters (third round)
15. (Italy) Francesca Schiavone (third round)
16. (Russia) Nadia Petrova (fourth round)
17. (Israel) Shahar Pe'er (fourth round)
18. (China) Zheng Jie (quarterfinals)
19. (France) Aravane Rezaï (fourth round)
20. (Ukraine) Alona Bondarenko (second round)
21. (Slovakia) Daniela Hantuchová (second round)
22. (Germany) Sabine Lisicki (second round, retired due to a left ankle injury)
23. (Russia) Alisa Kleybanova (quarterfinals)
24. (Serbia) Ana Ivanovic (second round)
25. (Russia) Anastasia Pavlyuchenkova (third round)
26. (Slovakia) Dominika Cibulková (second round)
27. (Hungary) Ágnes Szávay (third round)
28. (Spain) María José Martínez Sánchez (quarterfinals)
29. (Spain) Anabel Medina Garrigues (second round)
30. (Canada) Aleksandra Wozniak (second round)
31. (Argentina) Gisela Dulko (third round)
32. (Russia) Maria Kirilenko (third round)

== Draw ==
=== Key ===
- Q = Qualifier
- WC = Wild card
- LL = Lucky loser
- Alt = Alternate
- SE = Special exempt
- PR = Protected ranking
- ITF = ITF entry
- JE = Junior exempt
- w/o = Walkover
- r = Retired
- d = Defaulted
- SR = Special ranking

=== Finals ===
Quarterfinals
23	(Russia) Alisa Kleybanova	4	4
6	(Serbia) Jelena Janković	6	6
28	(Spain) María José Martínez Sánchez	3	6^{7}
8	(Australia) Samantha Stosur	6	7^{9}
5	(Poland) Agnieszka Radwańska	6	6
4	(Russia) Elena Dementieva	3	4
18	(China) Zheng Jie	4	6	1
2	(Denmark) Caroline Wozniacki	6	4	6

Semifinals
6	(Serbia) Jelena Janković	6	6
8	(Australia) Samantha Stosur	2	4
5	(Poland) Agnieszka Radwańska	2	3
2	(Denmark) Caroline Wozniacki	6	6

Final
6	(Serbia) Jelena Janković	6	6
2	(Denmark) Caroline Wozniacki	2	4

=== Top half ===
==== Section 1 ====
First round
(France) A Cornet	4	6	2
(Spain) C Suárez Navarro	6	1	6
Q	(Chinese Taipei) YJ Chan	6	7
(Switzerland) S Vögele	0	5
Q	(Bulgaria) T Pironkova	6	6
Q	(Uzbekistan) A Amanmuradova	3	2
(Czech Republic) B Záhlavová-Strýcová	6	6
(Germany) A Petkovic	3	3

Second round
1	(Russia) S Kuznetsova	4	6	1
(Spain) C Suárez Navarro	6	4	6
Q	(Chinese Taipei) YJ Chan	3	2
27	(Hungary) Á Szávay	6	6
23	(Russia) A Kleybanova	6^{5}	6	6
Q	(Bulgaria) T Pironkova	7^{7}	3	1
(Czech Republic) B Záhlavová-Strýcova	2	1
14	(Belgium) K Clijsters	6	6

Third round
(Spain) C Suárez Navarro	6	3	6
27	(Hungary) Á Szávay	4	6	1
23	(Russia) A Kleybanova	6	1	7^{7}
14	(Belgium) K Clijsters	4	6	6^{4}

Fourth round
(Spain) C Suárez Navarro	6	6^{2}	4
23	(Russia) A Kleybanova	2	7^{7}	6

==== Section 2 ====
First round
(Czech Republic) P Kvitová	6	6
(Italy) A Brianti	3	4
(Kazakhstan) Y Shvedova	5	5
WC	(United States) B Mattek-Sands	7	7
Q	(Ukraine) V Kutuzova	5	2
(Italy) S Errani	7	6
WC	(Croatia) A Tomljanović	6^{4}	1
Q	(Croatia) P Martić	7^{7}	6

Second round
9	(Italy) F Pennetta	6	6
(Czech Republic) P Kvitová	3	3
WC	(United States) B Mattek-Sands	2	3
17	(Israel) S Pe'er	6	6
26	(Slovakia) D Cibulková	5	4
(Italy) S Errani	7	6
Q	(Croatia) P Martić	3	6^{2}
6	(Serbia) J Janković	6	7^{7}

Third round
9	(Italy) F Pennetta	4	7^{7}	1
17	(Israel) S Pe'er	6	6^{4}	6
(Italy) S Errani	6	6^{6}	4
6	(Serbia) J Janković	2	7^{8}	6

Fourth round
17	(Israel) S Pe'er	2	2
6	(Serbia) J Janković	6	6

==== Section 3 ====
First round
(Slovenia) K Srebotnik	6	5	1
(Austria) S Bammer	3	7	6
(Romania) A Dulgheru	6	6
Q	(Portugal) M Larcher de Brito	2	2
(Italy) R Vinci	3	6	6
(United States) M Oudin	6	3	0
(Czech Republic) L Šafářová	5	6	3
(Germany) J Görges	7	3	6

Second round
3	(Belarus) V Azarenka	6	7
(Austria) S Bammer	1	5
(Romania) A Dulgheru	6	3	1
28	(Spain) MJ Martínez Sánchez	2	6	6
21	(Slovakia) D Hantuchová	3	5
(Italy) R Vinci	6	7
(Germany) J Görges	2	4
13	(Belgium) Y Wickmayer	6	6

Third round
3	(Belarus) V Azarenka	6^{4}	2
28	(Spain) MJ Martínez Sánchez	7^{7}	6
(Italy) R Vinci	1	6	3
13	(Belgium) Y Wickmayer	6	3	6

Fourth round
28	(Spain) MJ Martínez Sánchez	6	6
13	(Belgium) Y Wickmayer	4	4

==== Section 4 ====
First round
(Czech Republic) L Hradecká	6^{5}	6^{7}
Q	(United States) S Stephens	7^{7}	7^{9}
(Latvia) A Sevastova	6	3	6
Q	(Spain) N Llagostera Vives	2	6	1
Q	(Croatia) K Šprem	6	4	6
Q	(United States) S Perry	2	6	3
(France) J Coin	6	6
WC	(Austria) T Paszek	4	3

Second round
12	(Russia) V Zvonareva	6	7
Q	(United States) S Stephens	4	5
(Latvia) A Sevastova	6	6
24	(Serbia) A Ivanovic	2	4
25	(Russia) A Pavlyuchenkova	6	6
Q	(Croatia) K Šprem	3	1
(France) J Coin	3	4
8	(Australia) S Stosur	6	6

Third round
12	(Russia) V Zvonareva	6	6
(Latvia) A Sevastova	2	3
25	(Russia) A Pavlyuchenkova	0	3
8	(Australia) S Stosur	6	6

Fourth round
12	(Russia) V Zvonareva	2	5
8	(Australia) S Stosur	6	7

=== Bottom half ===
==== Section 5 ====
First round
(Russia) A Chakvetadze	2	6	6
(United Kingdom) A Keothavong	6	3	1
(Slovakia) M Rybariková	2	2
WC	(Belgium) J Henin	6	6
(United States) J Craybas	6	7
WC	(Greece) E Daniilidou	0	5
(Romania) IR Olaru	5	4
(Slovenia) P Hercog	7	6

Second round
5	(Poland) A Radwańska	6	5
(Russia) A Chakvetadze	2	3	r
WC	(Belgium) J Henin	2	6	4
31	(Argentina) G Dulko	6	1	6
22	(Germany) S Lisicki	4	7	0^{r}
(United States) J Craybas	6	5	2
(Slovenia) P Hercog	4	2
11	(France) M Bartoli	6	6

Third round
5	(Poland) A Radwańska	6	6
31	(Argentina) G Dulko	1	0
(United States) J Craybas	2	0
11	(France) M Bartoli	6	6

Fourth round
5	(Poland) A Radwańska	6	6
11	(France) M Bartoli	3	2

==== Section 6 ====
First round
(Hungary) M Czink	2	2
(Japan) K Date-Krumm	6	6
LL	(Thailand) T Tanasugarn	6	6
Q	(Romania) E Gallovits	2	3
(Switzerland) T Bacsinszky	6^{4}	7^{7}	1
(Belgium) K Flipkens	7^{7}	6^{5}	6
(Belarus) O Govortsova	6	4	7^{10}
(Czech Republic) I Benešová	0	6	6^{8}

Second round
15	(Italy) F Schiavone	6	6
(Japan) K Date-Krumm	3	4
LL	(Thailand) T Tanasugarn	4	5
19	(France) A Rezaï	6	7
30	(Canada) A Wozniak	1	2
(Belgium) K Flipkens	6	6
(Belarus) O Govortsova	4	6	0
4	(Russia) E Dementieva	6	4	6

Third round
15	(Italy) F Schiavone	7^{7}	6^{2}	4
19	(France) A Rezaï	6^{4}	7^{7}	6
(Belgium) K Flipkens	4	2
4	(Russia) E Dementieva	6	6

Fourth round
19	(France) A Rezaï	3	3
4	(Russia) E Dementieva	6	6

==== Section 7 ====
First round
WC	(United States) A Glatch	3	7^{7}	4
Q	(United Kingdom) E Baltacha	6	6^{3}	6
WC	(Australia) A Molik	6	6
(Germany) T Malek	1	3
(Romania) S Cîrstea	6^{1}	6	6
(Estonia) K Kanepi	7^{7}	3	4
(Australia) J Dokić	0	3
(Russia) V Dushevina	6	6

Second round
7	(China) N Li	6^{6}	6	6^{7}
Q	(United Kingdom) E Baltacha	7^{8}	2	7^{9}
WC	(Australia) A Molik	6	5	7^{7}
29	(Spain) A Medina Garrigues	4	7	6^{3}
18	(China) J Zheng	6	7
(Romania) S Cîrstea	3	5
(Russia) V Dushevina	6	5	2
10	(Russia) M Sharapova	4	7	6

Third round
Q	(United Kingdom) E Baltacha	0	2
WC	(Australia) A Molik	6	6
18	(China) J Zheng	6	2	6
10	(Russia) M Sharapova	3	6	3

Fourth round
WC	(Australia) A Molik	3	6	6^{1}
18	(China) J Zheng	6	4	7^{7}

==== Section 8 ====
First round
(Switzerland) P Schnyder	6	6
(Italy) T Garbin	1	2
(China) S Peng	6	2	6
(Russia) E Makarova	1	6	4
(France) V Razzano	6	6
(Germany) K Barrois	3	4
(United States) V King	7	6
WC	(United States) C McHale	5	3

Second round
16	(Russia) N Petrova	6	5	6
(Switzerland) P Schnyder	3	7	4
(China) S Peng	6	6
20	(Ukraine) A Bondarenko	1	4
32	(Russia) M Kirilenko	7	6
(France) V Razzano	5	3
(United States) V King	7	2	4
2	(Denmark) C Wozniacki	5	6	6

Third round
16	(Russia) N Petrova	6	7
(China) S Peng	1	5
32	(Russia) M Kirilenko	0	3
2	(Denmark) C Wozniacki	6	6

Fourth round
16	(Russia) N Petrova	3	6	0
2	(Denmark) C Wozniacki	6	3	6
