= 2004 Ladies German Open =

- Date: 3–9 May
- Edition: 93rd
- Category: Tier I
- Draw: 56S / 28D
- Prize money: $1,300,000
- Surface: Clay / outdoor
- Location: Berlin, Germany
- Venue: Rot-Weiss Tennis Club

Champions

Singles
- (France) Amélie Mauresmo

Doubles
- (Russia) Nadia Petrova (United States) Meghann Shaughnessy
- WTA German Open

The 2004 Ladies German Open was a women's tennis event that was played in Berlin, Germany from 3 May to 9 May 2004. It was one of two Tier I events that took place on red clay in the build-up to the second Grand Slam of the year, the French Open. It was the 93rd edition of the tournament. Second-seeded Amélie Mauresmo won the singles title and earned $189,000 first-prize money.

== Finals ==
=== Singles ===
(France) Amélie Mauresmo defeated (United States) Venus Williams, walkover

- It was Mauresmo's 1st singles title of the year and the 11th of her career.

=== Doubles ===
(Russia) Nadia Petrova / (United States) Meghann Shaughnessy defeated (Slovakia) Janette Husárová / (Spain) Conchita Martínez, 6–2, 2–6, 6–1

== Prize money ==
Event	W	F	SF	QF	Round of 16	Round of 32	Round of 64
Singles	$189,000	$95,900	$48,600	$24,600	$12,450	$6,300	$3,200
