= 2006 WTA Tour =

Women's tennis circuit

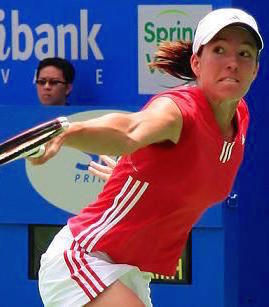
- Justine Henin-Hardenne finished the year as WTA world No. 1 for the second time in her career, though Amélie Mauresmo was named the Player of the Year. Henin-Hardenne won six tournaments during the season, including a major at the French Open, as well as the WTA Tour Championships; she also finished runner-up at the three other majors, the Australian Open, the Wimbledon Championships, and the US Open. Mauresmo won four tournaments during the season, including two majors at the Australian Open and the Wimbledon Championships.

Details
- Duration: 30 December 2005 – 6 November 2006
- Edition: 36th
- Tournaments: 61
- Categories: Grand Slam (4); WTA Championships; WTA Tier I (10); WTA Tier II (15); WTA Tier III (17); WTA Tier IV (14)

Achievements (singles)
- Most titles: (Belgium) Justine Henin (6)
- Most finals: (Belgium) Justine Henin (9)
- Prize money leader: (Belgium) Justine Henin (US$4,204,810)
- Points leader: (Belgium) Justine Henin (3,998)

Awards
- Player of the year: (France) Amélie Mauresmo
- Doubles team of the year: (United States) Lisa Raymond (Australia) Samantha Stosur
- Most improved player of the year: (Serbia) Jelena Janković
- Newcomer of the year: (Poland) Agnieszka Radwańska
- Comeback player of the year: (Switzerland) Martina Hingis

The 2006 Sony Ericsson WTA Tour was the 36th season since the founding of the Women's Tennis Association. It commenced on January 2, 2006, and concluded on November 12, 2006, after 61 events.

Justine Henin-Hardenne came out as the winner in a historic three-way battle for the No. 1 ranking at the season-ending WTA Tour Championships, beating out Sharapova and Mauresmo. The Belgian successfully defended her French Open title for her fifth Grand Slam title, and became the first woman since Steffi Graf in 1993 to reach the finals of all four Grand Slams and the WTA Tour Championships. Maria Sharapova won her second Grand Slam title at the U.S. Open, to add to her Wimbledon trophy from 2004. Amélie Mauresmo won her maiden Grand Slam at the Australian Open after a controversial retirement from Henin-Hardenne in the final. However, she later backed it up by winning a rematch with Henin-Hardenne in the Wimbledon final. She was the number one player in the world from March until the final event of the season.

Martina Hingis also made a successful return to the Tour, beginning her comeback at the Gold Coast event in January. She finished the season at No. 6 in the world and won the Tier I title at the Internazionali BNL d'Italia in Rome.

== Summary ==
Shortly before the beginning of the season former No. 1 Martina Hingis announced that she would return full-time to the tour for the start of the 2006 season, having already made an unsuccessful comeback attempt at an event in 2005.

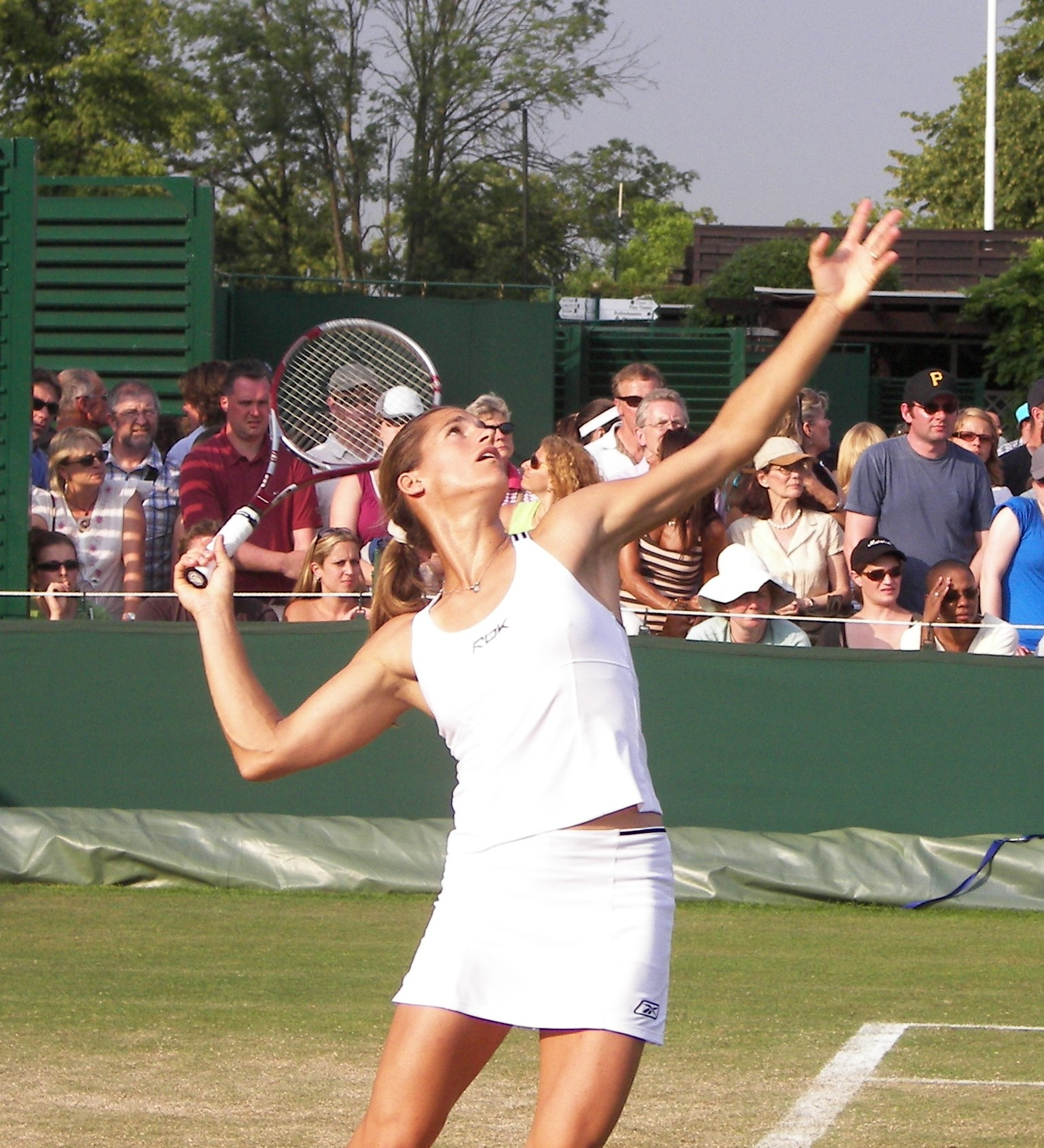
Amélie Mauresmo won her first Grand Slam title at the Australian Open, and followed it with her second at Wimbledon.

Amélie Mauresmo won her first Grand Slam title at the Australian Open after years of questions about her nerves and mental strength. However, her victory was marred by Henin-Hardenne's controversial retirement in the final due to stomach cramps. Defending champion Serena Williams lost in the third round to Daniela Hantuchová, with some commenting on the "extra weight" that she was carrying. The loss was the beginning of a season of injury struggles for the American, which saw her at one point drop out of the top 100. In the doubles tournament, Yan Zi and Zheng Jie produced a historic win for Chinese tennis by becoming the first players to win a Grand Slam of any kind for the nation. Martina Hingis won her first mixed doubles title with Mahesh Bhupathi.

Following the Australian Open Kim Clijsters ascended to the No. 1 position after Lindsay Davenport lost her finalist points. She held it until March when she lost her Indian Wells champion points, allowing Mauresmo to return to the position. The Frenchwoman held it until the final event of the season. Mauresmo had continued her strong start to the season with titles in Paris and Antwerp. Elena Dementieva won her biggest career title to that point in Tokyo. Meanwhile, Henin-Hardenne and Nadia Petrova won the Middle Eastern events in Dubai and Doha.

Maria Sharapova picked up her first title of the season in Indian Wells, beating Dementieva in the final. Svetlana Kuznetsova then won in Miami, her first Tier I title and second biggest overall, after a difficult 2005 season where she failed to back up her breakthrough in 2004 and dropped out the top 10.

The clay court season saw Hingis win in Rome for the biggest title of her comeback, but overall the period was dominated by Nadia Petrova, who went on an impressive 15-match winning streak, leading to titles in Amelia Island, Charleston and Berlin, beating Henin-Hardenne in the final of the latter. Her streak led to her being considered the favourite for the French Open title, but she suffered an injury and thus bowed out in the first round. Henin-Hardenne eventually defended her title and won her fifth Grand Slam by beating Kuznetsova in the final. Czech teenager Nicole Vaidišová made headlines by reaching her first Grand Slam semifinal with victories over Amélie Mauresmo and Venus Williams. The doubles event was won by Lisa Raymond and Samantha Stosur, while Katarina Srebotnik took home the mixed doubles trophy with Nenad Zimonjić.

The third Grand Slam of the year at Wimbledon saw all top four seeds reach the semifinals for only the fifth time in 25 years. Mauresmo and Henin advanced to the final, a rematch of their Australian Open final earlier in the season, with Mauresmo triumphant once more, becoming the first Frenchwoman in 81 years to win Wimbledon. Defending champion Venus Williams fell to Jelena Janković, making this year the first since 1999 neither Williams sister featured in the Wimbledon women's singles final. Williams did however make the mixed doubles final, losing to Vera Zvonareva who won her second Grand Slam in mixed doubles, partnering Bob Bryan. Yan Zi and Zheng Jie also won their second Grand Slam titles in the women's doubles event.

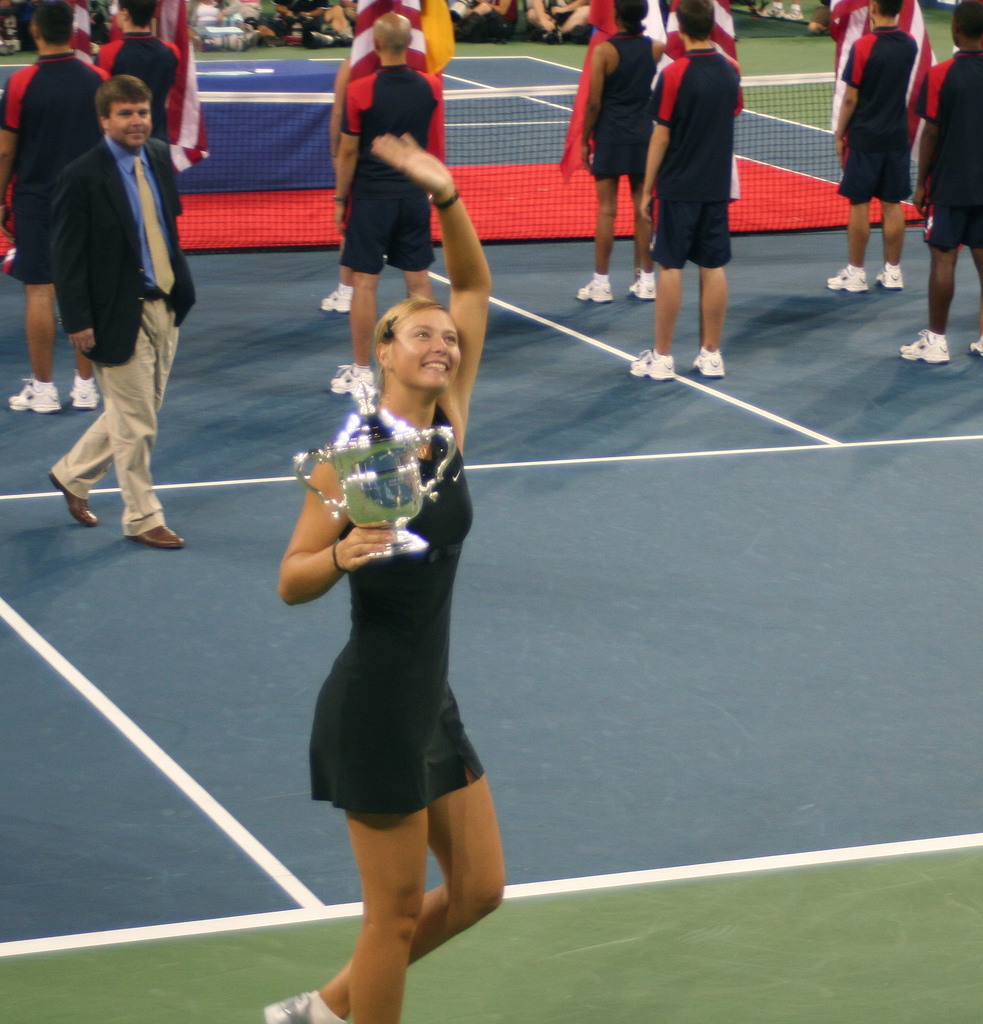
Maria Sharapova won her second Grand Slam at the U.S. Open, and four other events throughout the year.

Serena Williams, Mary Pierce, Lindsay Davenport and Nadia Petrova all returned from injuries during the summer hardcourt season. Clijsters won her fourth Stanford title, before losing to Sharapova in the final of San Diego—the Russian's first ever victory over Clijsters. Dementieva won the title in Los Angeles, beating Janković in the final. Janković's compatriot Ana Ivanovic went one further the next week in Montréal, and by winning the event over Hingis she became the U.S. Open Series champion for that year. Sharapova eventually picked up the grand prize, taking the U.S. Open title over Henin-Hardenne in the final. Janković backed up her strong result in Los Angeles with her first Grand Slam semifinal. In the doubles tournament Nathalie Dechy and Vera Zvonareva won the title in only their fourth tournament as a team. Tennis legend Martina Navratilova won the mixed doubles title and then announced her retirement from professional tennis.

Sharapova continued her strong results following her U.S. Open title in the fall season, winning events in Zurich and Linz. Nadia Petrova won her fifth title of the season in Stuttgart, but lost to the Russian teenager Anna Chakvetadze in the Moscow final. Kuznetsova also enjoyed a successful fall, winning titles in Bali and Beijing, beating Mauresmo in the final of the latter. Kim Clijsters returned at the end of the season, having missed her title defence at the U.S. Open, and won the smaller event in Hasselt.

The season climaxed at the WTA Tour Championships with Mauresmo, Sharapova, Henin-Hardenne, Kuznetsova, Petrova, Clijsters, Dementieva and Hingis all qualifying for the event. The tournament saw a three-way battle for the No. 1 position between Mauresmo, Sharapova and Henin-Hardenne, which was eventually decided when Henin-Hardenne beat Sharapova in the semifinal. The Belgian went on to defeat Mauresmo in the final. In the doubles event French Open champions Lisa Raymond and Samantha Stosur triumphed, consolidating their position as the year-end No. 1 in women's doubles.

== Schedule ==
The table below shows the 2006 WTA Tour schedule.

=== Key ===
Grand Slam events
Year-end championships
Tier I events
Tier II events
Tier III / IV events
Team events

=== January ===
Week	Tournament	Champions	Runners-up	Semifinalists	Quarterfinalists
2 Jan	Hopman Cup; Perth, Australia; Hopman Cup; Hard (i) – 8 teams (RR)	United States; 2–1	Netherlands	Round robin losers (Group A) Serbia and Montenegro; Sweden; Russia	Round robin losers (Group B) Australia; Argentina; Germany
2 Jan	MAW Hardcourts; Gold Coast, Australia; Tier III event Hard – $175,000 – 32S/32Q/16D; Singles – Doubles	(Czech Republic) Lucie Šafářová; 6–3, 6–4	(Italy) Flavia Pennetta	(Russia) Dinara Safina (Switzerland) Martina Hingis	(Switzerland) Patty Schnyder (Spain) Anabel Medina Garrigues (France) Tatiana Golovin (Spain) Nuria Llagostera Vives
2 Jan	MAW Hardcourts; Gold Coast, Australia; Tier III event Hard – $175,000 – 32S/32Q/16D; Singles – Doubles	(Russia) Dinara Safina (United States) Meghann Shaughnessy; 6–2, 6–3	(Zimbabwe) Cara Black (Australia) Rennae Stubbs	(Russia) Dinara Safina (Switzerland) Martina Hingis	(Switzerland) Patty Schnyder (Spain) Anabel Medina Garrigues (France) Tatiana Golovin (Spain) Nuria Llagostera Vives
2 Jan	ASB Classic; Auckland, New Zealand; Tier IV event Hard – $145,000 – 32S/32Q/16D; Singles – Doubles	(France) Marion Bartoli; 6–2, 6–2	(Russia) Vera Zvonareva	(Russia) Nadia Petrova (Slovakia) Daniela Hantuchová	(Puerto Rico) Kristina Brandi (Germany) Julia Schruff (Russia) Maria Kirilenko (Israel) Tzipora Obziler
2 Jan	ASB Classic; Auckland, New Zealand; Tier IV event Hard – $145,000 – 32S/32Q/16D; Singles – Doubles	(Russia) Elena Likhovtseva (Russia) Vera Zvonareva; 6–3, 6–4	(France) Émilie Loit (Czech Republic) Barbora Strýcová	(Russia) Nadia Petrova (Slovakia) Daniela Hantuchová	(Puerto Rico) Kristina Brandi (Germany) Julia Schruff (Russia) Maria Kirilenko (Israel) Tzipora Obziler
9 Jan	Medibank International; Sydney, Australia; Tier II event Hard – $600,000 – 32S/32Q/16D; Singles – Doubles	(Belgium) Justine Henin-Hardenne; 4–6, 7–5, 7–5	(Italy) Francesca Schiavone	(Czech Republic) Nicole Vaidišová (Russia) Svetlana Kuznetsova	(Belgium) Kim Clijsters (Slovakia) Daniela Hantuchová (Russia) Nadia Petrova (Serbia and Montenegro) Ana Ivanovic
9 Jan	Medibank International; Sydney, Australia; Tier II event Hard – $600,000 – 32S/32Q/16D; Singles – Doubles	(United States) Corina Morariu (Australia) Rennae Stubbs; 6–3, 5–7, 6–2	(Spain) Virginia Ruano Pascual (Argentina) Paola Suárez	(Czech Republic) Nicole Vaidišová (Russia) Svetlana Kuznetsova	(Belgium) Kim Clijsters (Slovakia) Daniela Hantuchová (Russia) Nadia Petrova (Serbia and Montenegro) Ana Ivanovic
9 Jan	Richard Luton Properties International; Canberra, Australia; Tier IV event Hard – $145,000 – 32S/30Q/16D; Singles – Doubles	(Spain) Anabel Medina Garrigues; 6–4, 0–6, 6–4	(South Korea) Cho Yoon-jeong	(Israel) Shahar Pe'er (Colombia) Catalina Castaño	(Russia) Ekaterina Bychkova (Japan) Aiko Nakamura (Germany) Julia Schruff (Hungary) Melinda Czink
9 Jan	Richard Luton Properties International; Canberra, Australia; Tier IV event Hard – $145,000 – 32S/30Q/16D; Singles – Doubles	(Poland) Marta Domachowska (Italy) Roberta Vinci; 7–6^{(7–5)}, 6–3	(United Kingdom) Claire Curran (Latvia) Līga Dekmeijere	(Israel) Shahar Pe'er (Colombia) Catalina Castaño	(Russia) Ekaterina Bychkova (Japan) Aiko Nakamura (Germany) Julia Schruff (Hungary) Melinda Czink
9 Jan	Moorilla Hobart International; Hobart, Australia; Tier IV event Hard – $145,000 – 32S/32Q/16D; Singles – Doubles	(Netherlands) Michaëlla Krajicek; 6–2, 6–1	(Czech Republic) Iveta Benešová	(Croatia) Jelena Kostanić (Italy) Mara Santangelo	(Ukraine) Alona Bondarenko (United States) Laura Granville (United States) Amy Frazier (United States) Jill Craybas
9 Jan	Moorilla Hobart International; Hobart, Australia; Tier IV event Hard – $145,000 – 32S/32Q/16D; Singles – Doubles	(France) Émilie Loit (Australia) Nicole Pratt; 6–2, 6–1	(United States) Jill Craybas (Croatia) Jelena Kostanić	(Croatia) Jelena Kostanić (Italy) Mara Santangelo	(Ukraine) Alona Bondarenko (United States) Laura Granville (United States) Amy Frazier (United States) Jill Craybas
16 Jan; 23 Jan	Australian Open; Melbourne, Australia; Grand Slam; Hard – $6,137,580 – 128S/96Q/64D/32X; Singles – Doubles – Mixed doubles	(France) Amélie Mauresmo; 6–1, 2–0 ret.	(Belgium) Justine Henin-Hardenne	(Russia) Maria Sharapova (Belgium) Kim Clijsters	(United States) Lindsay Davenport (Russia) Nadia Petrova (Switzerland) Patty Schnyder (Switzerland) Martina Hingis
16 Jan; 23 Jan	Australian Open; Melbourne, Australia; Grand Slam; Hard – $6,137,580 – 128S/96Q/64D/32X; Singles – Doubles – Mixed doubles	(China) Yan Zi (China) Zheng Jie; 2–6,7–6^{(9–7)}, 6–3	(United States) Lisa Raymond (Australia) Samantha Stosur	(Russia) Maria Sharapova (Belgium) Kim Clijsters	(United States) Lindsay Davenport (Russia) Nadia Petrova (Switzerland) Patty Schnyder (Switzerland) Martina Hingis
16 Jan; 23 Jan	Australian Open; Melbourne, Australia; Grand Slam; Hard – $6,137,580 – 128S/96Q/64D/32X; Singles – Doubles – Mixed doubles	(India) Mahesh Bhupathi (Switzerland) Martina Hingis; 6–3, 6–3	(Canada) Daniel Nestor (Russia) Elena Likhovtseva	(Russia) Maria Sharapova (Belgium) Kim Clijsters	(United States) Lindsay Davenport (Russia) Nadia Petrova (Switzerland) Patty Schnyder (Switzerland) Martina Hingis
30 Jan	Toray Pan Pacific Open; Tokyo, Japan; Tier I event Carpet (i) – $1,340,000 – 28S/32Q/16D; Singles – Doubles	(Russia) Elena Dementieva; 6–2, 6–0	(Switzerland) Martina Hingis	(Russia) Maria Sharapova (Russia) Anastasia Myskina	(Australia) Samantha Stosur (Russia) Maria Kirilenko (Russia) Elena Likhovtseva (Czech Republic) Nicole Vaidišová
30 Jan	Toray Pan Pacific Open; Tokyo, Japan; Tier I event Carpet (i) – $1,340,000 – 28S/32Q/16D; Singles – Doubles	(United States) Lisa Raymond (Australia) Samantha Stosur; 6–2, 6–1	(Zimbabwe) Cara Black (Australia) Rennae Stubbs	(Russia) Maria Sharapova (Russia) Anastasia Myskina	(Australia) Samantha Stosur (Russia) Maria Kirilenko (Russia) Elena Likhovtseva (Czech Republic) Nicole Vaidišová

=== February ===
Week	Tournament	Champions	Runners-up	Semifinalists	Quarterfinalists
6 Feb	Open Gaz de France; Paris, France; Tier II event Hard (i) – $600,000 – 28S/32Q/16D; Singles – Doubles	(France) Amélie Mauresmo; 6–1,7–6^{(7–2)}	(France) Mary Pierce	(France) Tatiana Golovin (Switzerland) Patty Schnyder	(Russia) Dinara Safina (Russia) Nadia Petrova (Russia) Elena Dementieva (France) Émilie Loit
6 Feb	Open Gaz de France; Paris, France; Tier II event Hard (i) – $600,000 – 28S/32Q/16D; Singles – Doubles	(France) Émilie Loit (Czech Republic) Květa Peschke; 7–6^{(7–5)}, 6–4	(Zimbabwe) Cara Black (Australia) Rennae Stubbs	(France) Tatiana Golovin (Switzerland) Patty Schnyder	(Russia) Dinara Safina (Russia) Nadia Petrova (Russia) Elena Dementieva (France) Émilie Loit
6 Feb	Pattaya Women's Open; Pattaya, Thailand; Tier IV event Hard – $170,000 – 32S/32Q/16D; Singles – Doubles	(Israel) Shahar Pe'er; 6–3, 6–1	(Croatia) Jelena Kostanić	(Austria) Sybille Bammer (Spain) Nuria Llagostera Vives	(Hungary) Melinda Czink (Spain) Lourdes Domínguez Lino (Colombia) Catalina Castaño (Finland) Emma Laine
6 Feb	Pattaya Women's Open; Pattaya, Thailand; Tier IV event Hard – $170,000 – 32S/32Q/16D; Singles – Doubles	(China) Li Ting (China) Sun Tiantian; 3–6, 6–1,7–6^{(7–5)}	(China) Yan Zi (China) Zheng Jie	(Austria) Sybille Bammer (Spain) Nuria Llagostera Vives	(Hungary) Melinda Czink (Spain) Lourdes Domínguez Lino (Colombia) Catalina Castaño (Finland) Emma Laine
13 Feb	Proximus Diamond Games; Antwerp, Belgium; Tier II event Hard (i) – $600,000 – 28S/32Q/16D; Singles – Doubles	(France) Amélie Mauresmo; 3–6, 6–3, 6–3	(Belgium) Kim Clijsters	(Russia) Elena Dementieva (Russia) Nadia Petrova	(Russia) Dinara Safina (Greece) Eleni Daniilidou (Ukraine) Olga Savchuk (Switzerland) Patty Schnyder
13 Feb	Proximus Diamond Games; Antwerp, Belgium; Tier II event Hard (i) – $600,000 – 28S/32Q/16D; Singles – Doubles	(Russia) Dinara Safina (Slovenia) Katarina Srebotnik; 6–1, 6–1	(France) Stéphanie Foretz (Netherlands) Michaëlla Krajicek	(Russia) Elena Dementieva (Russia) Nadia Petrova	(Russia) Dinara Safina (Greece) Eleni Daniilidou (Ukraine) Olga Savchuk (Switzerland) Patty Schnyder
13 Feb	Sony Ericsson Bangalore Open; Bangalore, India; Tier III event Hard – $175,000 – 32S/32Q/16D; Singles – Doubles	(Italy) Mara Santangelo; 3–6,7–6^{(7–5)}, 6–3	(Croatia) Jelena Kostanić	(United States) Vania King (Hungary) Melinda Czink	(France) Camille Pin (Ukraine) Yuliana Fedak (Ukraine) Alona Bondarenko (Italy) Maria Elena Camerin
13 Feb	Sony Ericsson Bangalore Open; Bangalore, India; Tier III event Hard – $175,000 – 32S/32Q/16D; Singles – Doubles	(South Africa) Liezel Huber (India) Sania Mirza; 6–3, 6–3	(Russia) Anastasia Rodionova (Russia) Elena Vesnina	(United States) Vania King (Hungary) Melinda Czink	(France) Camille Pin (Ukraine) Yuliana Fedak (Ukraine) Alona Bondarenko (Italy) Maria Elena Camerin
20 Feb	Dubai Duty Free Women's Open; Dubai, United Arab Emirates; Tier II event Hard – $1,000,000 – 28S/32Q/16D; Singles – Doubles	(Belgium) Justine Henin-Hardenne; 7–5, 6–2	(Russia) Maria Sharapova	(Russia) Svetlana Kuznetsova (United States) Lindsay Davenport	(France) Amélie Mauresmo (Italy) Francesca Schiavone (Switzerland) Martina Hingis (Russia) Maria Kirilenko
20 Feb	Dubai Duty Free Women's Open; Dubai, United Arab Emirates; Tier II event Hard – $1,000,000 – 28S/32Q/16D; Singles – Doubles	(Czech Republic) Květa Peschke (Italy) Francesca Schiavone; 3–6,7–6^{(7–1)}, 6–3	(Russia) Svetlana Kuznetsova (Russia) Nadia Petrova	(Russia) Svetlana Kuznetsova (United States) Lindsay Davenport	(France) Amélie Mauresmo (Italy) Francesca Schiavone (Switzerland) Martina Hingis (Russia) Maria Kirilenko
20 Feb	Cellular South Cup; Memphis, United States; Tier III event Hard (i) – $175,000 – 32S/32Q/16D; Singles – Doubles	(Sweden) Sofia Arvidsson; 6–2, 2–6, 6–3	(Poland) Marta Domachowska	(United States) Jill Craybas (United States) Amy Frazier	(United States) Lilia Osterloh (United States) Laura Granville (Denmark) Caroline Wozniacki (United States) Shenay Perry
20 Feb	Cellular South Cup; Memphis, United States; Tier III event Hard (i) – $175,000 – 32S/32Q/16D; Singles – Doubles	(United States) Lisa Raymond (Australia) Samantha Stosur; 7–6^{(7–2)}, 6–3	(Belarus) Victoria Azarenka (Denmark) Caroline Wozniacki	(United States) Jill Craybas (United States) Amy Frazier	(United States) Lilia Osterloh (United States) Laura Granville (Denmark) Caroline Wozniacki (United States) Shenay Perry
20 Feb	Copa Colsanitas Seguros Bolívar; Bogotá, Colombia; Tier III event Clay – $175,000 – 32S/32Q/16D; Singles – Doubles	(Spain) Lourdes Domínguez Lino; 7–6^{(7–3)}, 6–4	(Italy) Flavia Pennetta	(Spain) María Sánchez Lorenzo (Slovakia) Ľudmila Cervanová	(United States) Bethanie Mattek (Colombia) Catalina Castaño (France) Émilie Loit (Argentina) Gisela Dulko
20 Feb	Copa Colsanitas Seguros Bolívar; Bogotá, Colombia; Tier III event Clay – $175,000 – 32S/32Q/16D; Singles – Doubles	(Argentina) Gisela Dulko (Italy) Flavia Pennetta; 7–6^{(7–1)}, 6–1	(Hungary) Ágnes Szávay (Germany) Jasmin Wöhr	(Spain) María Sánchez Lorenzo (Slovakia) Ľudmila Cervanová	(United States) Bethanie Mattek (Colombia) Catalina Castaño (France) Émilie Loit (Argentina) Gisela Dulko
27 Feb	Qatar Ladies Open; Doha, Qatar; Tier II event Hard – $600,000 – 28S/32Q/16D; Singles – Doubles	(Russia) Nadia Petrova; 6–3, 7–5	(France) Amélie Mauresmo	(Switzerland) Martina Hingis (Japan) Ai Sugiyama	(Italy) Roberta Vinci (Russia) Svetlana Kuznetsova (Germany) Julia Schruff (China) Li Na
27 Feb	Qatar Ladies Open; Doha, Qatar; Tier II event Hard – $600,000 – 28S/32Q/16D; Singles – Doubles	(Slovakia) Daniela Hantuchová (Japan) Ai Sugiyama; 6–4, 6–4	(China) Li Ting (China) Sun Tiantian	(Switzerland) Martina Hingis (Japan) Ai Sugiyama	(Italy) Roberta Vinci (Russia) Svetlana Kuznetsova (Germany) Julia Schruff (China) Li Na
27 Feb	Abierto Mexicano Telcel; Acapulco, Mexico; Tier III event Clay – $180,000 – 32S/26Q/16D; Singles – Doubles	(Germany) Anna-Lena Grönefeld; 6–1, 4–6, 6–2	(Italy) Flavia Pennetta	(Estonia) Maret Ani (France) Émilie Loit	(Spain) María José Martínez (Spain) Laura Pous Tió (Argentina) Natalia Gussoni (United States) Meghann Shaughnessy
27 Feb	Abierto Mexicano Telcel; Acapulco, Mexico; Tier III event Clay – $180,000 – 32S/26Q/16D; Singles – Doubles	(Germany) Anna-Lena Grönefeld (United States) Meghann Shaughnessy; 6–1, 6–3	(Japan) Shinobu Asagoe (France) Émilie Loit	(Estonia) Maret Ani (France) Émilie Loit	(Spain) María José Martínez (Spain) Laura Pous Tió (Argentina) Natalia Gussoni (United States) Meghann Shaughnessy

=== March ===
Week	Tournament	Champions	Runners-up	Semifinalists	Quarterfinalists
6 Mar; 13 Mar	Pacific Life Open; Indian Wells, United States; Tier I event Hard – $2,100,000 – 96S/48Q/32D; Singles – Doubles	(Russia) Maria Sharapova; 6–1, 6–2	(Russia) Elena Dementieva	(Belgium) Justine Henin-Hardenne (Switzerland) Martina Hingis	(Argentina) Gisela Dulko (Serbia and Montenegro) Ana Ivanovic (Germany) Anna-Lena Grönefeld (Russia) Dinara Safina
6 Mar; 13 Mar	Pacific Life Open; Indian Wells, United States; Tier I event Hard – $2,100,000 – 96S/48Q/32D; Singles – Doubles	(United States) Lisa Raymond (Australia) Samantha Stosur; 6–2, 7–5	(Spain) Virginia Ruano Pascual (United States) Meghann Shaughnessy	(Belgium) Justine Henin-Hardenne (Switzerland) Martina Hingis	(Argentina) Gisela Dulko (Serbia and Montenegro) Ana Ivanovic (Germany) Anna-Lena Grönefeld (Russia) Dinara Safina
20 Mar; 27 Mar	NASDAQ-100 Open; Key Biscayne, United States; Tier I event Hard – $3,450,000 – 96S/48Q/32D; Singles – Doubles	(Russia) Svetlana Kuznetsova; 6–4, 6–3	(Russia) Maria Sharapova	(France) Amélie Mauresmo (France) Tatiana Golovin	(Russia) Nadia Petrova (Japan) Ai Sugiyama (Russia) Anastasia Myskina (China) Zheng Jie
20 Mar; 27 Mar	NASDAQ-100 Open; Key Biscayne, United States; Tier I event Hard – $3,450,000 – 96S/48Q/32D; Singles – Doubles	(United States) Lisa Raymond (Australia) Samantha Stosur; 6–4, 7–5	(South Africa) Liezel Huber (United States) Martina Navratilova	(France) Amélie Mauresmo (France) Tatiana Golovin	(Russia) Nadia Petrova (Japan) Ai Sugiyama (Russia) Anastasia Myskina (China) Zheng Jie

=== April ===
Week	Tournament	Champions	Runners-up	Semifinalists	Quarterfinalists
3 Apr	Bausch & Lomb Championships; Amelia Island, United States; Tier II event Clay – $600,000 (Green) – 56S/32Q/16D; Singles – Doubles	(Russia) Nadia Petrova; 6–4, 6–4	(Italy) Francesca Schiavone	(Czech Republic) Lucie Šafářová (Russia) Svetlana Kuznetsova	(Spain) Virginia Ruano Pascual (United States) Jill Craybas (Germany) Anna-Lena Grönefeld (Switzerland) Patty Schnyder
3 Apr	Bausch & Lomb Championships; Amelia Island, United States; Tier II event Clay – $600,000 (Green) – 56S/32Q/16D; Singles – Doubles	(Japan) Shinobu Asagoe (Slovenia) Katarina Srebotnik; 6–2, 6–4	(South Africa) Liezel Huber (India) Sania Mirza	(Czech Republic) Lucie Šafářová (Russia) Svetlana Kuznetsova	(Spain) Virginia Ruano Pascual (United States) Jill Craybas (Germany) Anna-Lena Grönefeld (Switzerland) Patty Schnyder
10 Apr	Family Circle Cup; Charleston, United States; Tier I event Clay – $1,340,000 (Green) – 56S/32Q/28D; Singles – Doubles	(Russia) Nadia Petrova; 6–3, 4–6, 6–1	(Switzerland) Patty Schnyder	(Belgium) Justine Henin-Hardenne (Germany) Anna-Lena Grönefeld	(Russia) Dinara Safina (France) Nathalie Dechy (Russia) Svetlana Kuznetsova (Colombia) Catalina Castaño
10 Apr	Family Circle Cup; Charleston, United States; Tier I event Clay – $1,340,000 (Green) – 56S/32Q/28D; Singles – Doubles	(United States) Lisa Raymond (Australia) Samantha Stosur; 3–6, 6–1, 6–1	(Spain) Virginia Ruano Pascual (United States) Meghann Shaughnessy	(Belgium) Justine Henin-Hardenne (Germany) Anna-Lena Grönefeld	(Russia) Dinara Safina (France) Nathalie Dechy (Russia) Svetlana Kuznetsova (Colombia) Catalina Castaño
17 Apr	Fed Cup: Quarterfinals; Liège, Belgium, Hard (i); Ettenheim, Germany, Clay; Valencia, Spain, Clay; Nancy, France, Clay (i)	Quarterfinal winners Belgium 3–2; United States 3–2; Spain 5–0; Italy 4–1	Quarterfinal losers Russia; Germany; Austria; France		

=== May ===
Week	Tournament	Champions	Runners-up	Semifinalists	Quarterfinalists
1 May	J&S Cup; Warsaw, Poland; Tier II event Clay – $600,000 – 28S/32Q/16D; Singles – Doubles	(Belgium) Kim Clijsters; 7–5, 6–2	(Russia) Svetlana Kuznetsova	(Russia) Elena Dementieva (Russia) Anna Chakvetadze	(Italy) Francesca Schiavone (Poland) Agnieszka Radwańska (United States) Venus Williams (Serbia and Montenegro) Ana Ivanovic
1 May	J&S Cup; Warsaw, Poland; Tier II event Clay – $600,000 – 28S/32Q/16D; Singles – Doubles	(Russia) Elena Likhovtseva (Russia) Anastasia Myskina; 6–3, 6–4	(Spain) Anabel Medina Garrigues (Slovenia) Katarina Srebotnik	(Russia) Elena Dementieva (Russia) Anna Chakvetadze	(Italy) Francesca Schiavone (Poland) Agnieszka Radwańska (United States) Venus Williams (Serbia and Montenegro) Ana Ivanovic
1 May	Estoril Open; Oeiras, Portugal; Tier IV event Clay – $145,000 – 32S/32Q/16D; Singles – Doubles	(China) Zheng Jie; 6–7^{(5–7)}, 7–5 ret.	(China) Li Na	(Italy) Flavia Pennetta (France) Émilie Loit	(Greece) Eleni Daniilidou (Czech Republic) Zuzana Ondrášková (Spain) Lourdes Domínguez Lino (Argentina) Gisela Dulko
1 May	Estoril Open; Oeiras, Portugal; Tier IV event Clay – $145,000 – 32S/32Q/16D; Singles – Doubles	(China) Li Ting (China) Sun Tiantian; 6–2, 6–2	(Argentina) Gisela Dulko (Spain) María Sánchez Lorenzo	(Italy) Flavia Pennetta (France) Émilie Loit	(Greece) Eleni Daniilidou (Czech Republic) Zuzana Ondrášková (Spain) Lourdes Domínguez Lino (Argentina) Gisela Dulko
8 May	Qatar Telecom German Open; Berlin, Germany; Tier I event Clay – $1,340,000 – 56S/32Q/28D; Singles – Doubles	(Russia) Nadia Petrova; 4–6, 6–4, 7–5	(Belgium) Justine Henin-Hardenne	(France) Amélie Mauresmo (China) Li Na	(Switzerland) Martina Hingis (Russia) Svetlana Kuznetsova (Switzerland) Patty Schnyder (Russia) Dinara Safina
8 May	Qatar Telecom German Open; Berlin, Germany; Tier I event Clay – $1,340,000 – 56S/32Q/28D; Singles – Doubles	(China) Yan Zi (China) Zheng Jie; 6–2, 6–3	(Russia) Elena Dementieva (Italy) Flavia Pennetta	(France) Amélie Mauresmo (China) Li Na	(Switzerland) Martina Hingis (Russia) Svetlana Kuznetsova (Switzerland) Patty Schnyder (Russia) Dinara Safina
8 May	ECM Prague Open; Prague, Czech Republic; Tier IV event Clay – $145,000 – 32S/32Q/16D; Singles – Doubles	(Israel) Shahar Pe'er; 4–6, 6–2, 6–1	(Australia) Samantha Stosur	(Estonia) Kaia Kanepi (China) Peng Shuai	(Italy) Maria Elena Camerin (Ukraine) Alona Bondarenko (France) Émilie Loit (Slovakia) Magdaléna Rybáriková
8 May	ECM Prague Open; Prague, Czech Republic; Tier IV event Clay – $145,000 – 32S/32Q/16D; Singles – Doubles	(France) Marion Bartoli (Israel) Shahar Pe'er; 6–4, 6–4	(United States) Ashley Harkleroad (United States) Bethanie Mattek	(Estonia) Kaia Kanepi (China) Peng Shuai	(Italy) Maria Elena Camerin (Ukraine) Alona Bondarenko (France) Émilie Loit (Slovakia) Magdaléna Rybáriková
15 May	Telecom Italia Masters; Rome, Italy; Tier I event Clay – $1,340,000 – 56S/32Q/28D; Singles – Doubles	(Switzerland) Martina Hingis; 6–2, 7–5	(Russia) Dinara Safina	(United States) Venus Williams (Russia) Svetlana Kuznetsova	(Italy) Flavia Pennetta (Serbia and Montenegro) Jelena Janković (Italy) Romina Oprandi (Russia) Elena Dementieva
15 May	Telecom Italia Masters; Rome, Italy; Tier I event Clay – $1,340,000 – 56S/32Q/28D; Singles – Doubles	(Slovakia) Daniela Hantuchová (Japan) Ai Sugiyama; 3–6, 6–3, 6–1	(Czech Republic) Květa Peschke (Italy) Francesca Schiavone	(United States) Venus Williams (Russia) Svetlana Kuznetsova	(Italy) Flavia Pennetta (Serbia and Montenegro) Jelena Janković (Italy) Romina Oprandi (Russia) Elena Dementieva
15 May	GP de SAR La Princess Lalla Meryem; Rabat, Morocco; Tier IV event Clay – $145,000 – 32S/26Q/14D; Singles – Doubles	(United States) Meghann Shaughnessy; 6–2, 3–6, 6–3	(Slovakia) Martina Suchá	(China) Yan Zi (Ukraine) Alona Bondarenko	(Hungary) Melinda Czink (France) Émilie Loit (Czech Republic) Hana Šromová (Luxembourg) Anne Kremer
15 May	GP de SAR La Princess Lalla Meryem; Rabat, Morocco; Tier IV event Clay – $145,000 – 32S/26Q/14D; Singles – Doubles	(China) Yan Zi (China) Zheng Jie; 6–1, 6–3	(United States) Ashley Harkleroad (United States) Bethanie Mattek	(China) Yan Zi (Ukraine) Alona Bondarenko	(Hungary) Melinda Czink (France) Émilie Loit (Czech Republic) Hana Šromová (Luxembourg) Anne Kremer
22 May	İstanbul Cup; Istanbul, Turkey; Tier III event Clay – $200,000 – 30S/32Q/16D; Singles – Doubles	(Israel) Shahar Pe'er; 1–6, 6–3, 7–6^{(7–3)}	(Russia) Anastasia Myskina	(Netherlands) Michaëlla Krajicek (Germany) Anna-Lena Grönefeld	(Colombia) Catalina Castaño (Belarus) Anastasiya Yakimova (Italy) Mara Santangelo (Croatia) Karolina Šprem
22 May	İstanbul Cup; Istanbul, Turkey; Tier III event Clay – $200,000 – 30S/32Q/16D; Singles – Doubles	(Ukraine) Alona Bondarenko (Belarus) Anastasiya Yakimova; 6–2, 6–4	(India) Sania Mirza (Australia) Alicia Molik	(Netherlands) Michaëlla Krajicek (Germany) Anna-Lena Grönefeld	(Colombia) Catalina Castaño (Belarus) Anastasiya Yakimova (Italy) Mara Santangelo (Croatia) Karolina Šprem
22 May	Internationaux de Strasbourg; Strasbourg, France; Tier III event Clay – $175,000 – 30S/30Q/16D; Singles – Doubles	(Czech Republic) Nicole Vaidišová; 7–6^{(9–7)}, 6–3	(China) Peng Shuai	(Serbia and Montenegro) Jelena Janković (Spain) Anabel Medina Garrigues	(Germany) Martina Müller (Russia) Elena Vesnina (China) Li Na (China) Zheng Jie
22 May	Internationaux de Strasbourg; Strasbourg, France; Tier III event Clay – $175,000 – 30S/30Q/16D; Singles – Doubles	(South Africa) Liezel Huber (United States) Martina Navratilova; 6–2,7–6^{(7–1)}	(Germany) Martina Müller (Romania) Andreea Ehritt-Vanc	(Serbia and Montenegro) Jelena Janković (Spain) Anabel Medina Garrigues	(Germany) Martina Müller (Russia) Elena Vesnina (China) Li Na (China) Zheng Jie
29 May; 5 Jun	French Open; Paris, France; Grand Slam; Clay – $6,747,626 – 128S/96Q/64D/32X; Singles – Doubles – Mixed doubles	(Belgium) Justine Henin-Hardenne; 6–4, 6–4	(Russia) Svetlana Kuznetsova	(Czech Republic) Nicole Vaidišová (Belgium) Kim Clijsters	(United States) Venus Williams (Russia) Dinara Safina (Germany) Anna-Lena Grönefeld (Switzerland) Martina Hingis
29 May; 5 Jun	French Open; Paris, France; Grand Slam; Clay – $6,747,626 – 128S/96Q/64D/32X; Singles – Doubles – Mixed doubles	(United States) Lisa Raymond (Australia) Samantha Stosur; 6–3, 6–2	(Slovakia) Daniela Hantuchová (Japan) Ai Sugiyama	(Czech Republic) Nicole Vaidišová (Belgium) Kim Clijsters	(United States) Venus Williams (Russia) Dinara Safina (Germany) Anna-Lena Grönefeld (Switzerland) Martina Hingis
29 May; 5 Jun	French Open; Paris, France; Grand Slam; Clay – $6,747,626 – 128S/96Q/64D/32X; Singles – Doubles – Mixed doubles	(Serbia and Montenegro) Nenad Zimonjić (Slovenia) Katarina Srebotnik; 6–3, 6–4	(Canada) Daniel Nestor (Russia) Elena Likhovtseva	(Czech Republic) Nicole Vaidišová (Belgium) Kim Clijsters	(United States) Venus Williams (Russia) Dinara Safina (Germany) Anna-Lena Grönefeld (Switzerland) Martina Hingis

=== June ===
Week	Tournament	Champions	Runners-up	Semifinalists	Quarterfinalists
12 Jun	DFS Classic; Birmingham, Great Britain; Tier III event Grass – $200,000 – 56S/32Q/16D; Singles – Doubles	(Russia) Vera Zvonareva; 7–6^{(14–12)}, 7–6^{(7–5)}	(United States) Jamea Jackson	(Russia) Maria Sharapova (United States) Meilen Tu	(Italy) Mara Santangelo (Russia) Elena Likhovtseva (France) Marion Bartoli (Italy) Francesca Schiavone
12 Jun	DFS Classic; Birmingham, Great Britain; Tier III event Grass – $200,000 – 56S/32Q/16D; Singles – Doubles	(Serbia and Montenegro) Jelena Janković (China) Li Na; 6–2, 6–4	(United States) Jill Craybas (South Africa) Liezel Huber	(Russia) Maria Sharapova (United States) Meilen Tu	(Italy) Mara Santangelo (Russia) Elena Likhovtseva (France) Marion Bartoli (Italy) Francesca Schiavone
19 Jun	Hastings Direct Int'l Championships; Eastbourne, Great Britain; Tier II event Grass – $600,000 – 28S/32Q/16D; Singles – Doubles	(Belgium) Justine Henin-Hardenne; 4–6, 6–1, 7–6^{(7–5)}	(Russia) Anastasia Myskina	(Russia) Svetlana Kuznetsova (Belgium) Kim Clijsters	(France) Nathalie Dechy (Germany) Anna-Lena Grönefeld (Russia) Elena Likhovtseva (Italy) Francesca Schiavone
19 Jun	Hastings Direct Int'l Championships; Eastbourne, Great Britain; Tier II event Grass – $600,000 – 28S/32Q/16D; Singles – Doubles	(Russia) Svetlana Kuznetsova (France) Amélie Mauresmo; 6–2, 6–4	(South Africa) Liezel Huber (United States) Martina Navratilova	(Russia) Svetlana Kuznetsova (Belgium) Kim Clijsters	(France) Nathalie Dechy (Germany) Anna-Lena Grönefeld (Russia) Elena Likhovtseva (Italy) Francesca Schiavone
19 Jun	Ordina Open 's-Hertogenbosch, Netherlands; Tier III event Grass – $175,000 – 32S/32Q/16D; Singles – Doubles	(Netherlands) Michaëlla Krajicek; 6–3, 6–4	(Russia) Dinara Safina	(Russia) Elena Dementieva (Greece) Eleni Daniilidou	(Serbia) Ana Ivanovic (Serbia) Jelena Janković (Argentina) Paola Suárez (Netherlands) Brenda Schultz-McCarthy
19 Jun	Ordina Open 's-Hertogenbosch, Netherlands; Tier III event Grass – $175,000 – 32S/32Q/16D; Singles – Doubles	(China) Yan Zi (China) Zheng Jie; 3–6, 6–2, 6–2	(Serbia) Ana Ivanovic (Russia) Maria Kirilenko	(Russia) Elena Dementieva (Greece) Eleni Daniilidou	(Serbia) Ana Ivanovic (Serbia) Jelena Janković (Argentina) Paola Suárez (Netherlands) Brenda Schultz-McCarthy
26 Jun; 3 Jul	Wimbledon Championships; London, Great Britain; Grand Slam; Grass – $6,743,737 – 128S/96Q/64D/32X; Singles – Doubles – Mixed doubles	(France) Amélie Mauresmo; 2–6, 6–3, 6–4	(Belgium) Justine Henin-Hardenne	(Russia) Maria Sharapova (Belgium) Kim Clijsters	(Russia) Anastasia Myskina (Russia) Elena Dementieva (France) Séverine Brémond (China) Li Na
26 Jun; 3 Jul	Wimbledon Championships; London, Great Britain; Grand Slam; Grass – $6,743,737 – 128S/96Q/64D/32X; Singles – Doubles – Mixed doubles	(China) Yan Zi (China) Zheng Jie; 6–3, 3–6, 6–2	(Spain) Virginia Ruano Pascual (Argentina) Paola Suárez	(Russia) Maria Sharapova (Belgium) Kim Clijsters	(Russia) Anastasia Myskina (Russia) Elena Dementieva (France) Séverine Brémond (China) Li Na
26 Jun; 3 Jul	Wimbledon Championships; London, Great Britain; Grand Slam; Grass – $6,743,737 – 128S/96Q/64D/32X; Singles – Doubles – Mixed doubles	(Israel) Andy Ram (Russia) Vera Zvonareva; 6–3, 6–2	(United States) Bob Bryan (United States) Venus Williams	(Russia) Maria Sharapova (Belgium) Kim Clijsters	(Russia) Anastasia Myskina (Russia) Elena Dementieva (France) Séverine Brémond (China) Li Na

=== July ===
Week	Tournament	Champions	Runners-up	Semifinalists	Quarterfinalists
10 Jul	Fed Cup: Semifinals; Ostend, Belgium, Hard (i); Zaragoza, Spain, Clay	Semifinal winners Belgium 4–1; Italy 4–0	Semifinal losers United States; Spain		
17 Jul	W&S Financial Group Women's Open; Mason, United States; Tier III event Hard – $175,000 – 32S/16Q/16D; Singles – Doubles	(Russia) Vera Zvonareva; 6–2, 6–4	(Slovenia) Katarina Srebotnik	(Switzerland) Patty Schnyder (United States) Serena Williams	(India) Sania Mirza (France) Marion Bartoli (Serbia) Jelena Janković (United States) Amy Frazier
17 Jul	W&S Financial Group Women's Open; Mason, United States; Tier III event Hard – $175,000 – 32S/16Q/16D; Singles – Doubles	(Italy) Maria Elena Camerin (Argentina) Gisela Dulko; 6–4, 3–6, 6–2	(Poland) Marta Domachowska (India) Sania Mirza	(Switzerland) Patty Schnyder (United States) Serena Williams	(India) Sania Mirza (France) Marion Bartoli (Serbia) Jelena Janković (United States) Amy Frazier
17 Jul	Internazionali Femminili di Palermo; Palermo, Italy; Tier IV event Clay – $145,000 – 32S/26Q/16D; Singles – Doubles	(Spain) Anabel Medina Garrigues; 6–4, 6–4	(Italy) Tathiana Garbin	(Italy) Roberta Vinci (Czech Republic) Lucie Šafářová	(Germany) Julia Schruff (France) Aravane Rezaï (Spain) María José Martínez Sánchez (Italy) Karin Knapp
17 Jul	Internazionali Femminili di Palermo; Palermo, Italy; Tier IV event Clay – $145,000 – 32S/26Q/16D; Singles – Doubles	(Slovakia) Janette Husárová (Netherlands) Michaëlla Krajicek; 6–0, 6–0	(Italy) Alice Canepa (Italy) Giulia Gabba	(Italy) Roberta Vinci (Czech Republic) Lucie Šafářová	(Germany) Julia Schruff (France) Aravane Rezaï (Spain) María José Martínez Sánchez (Italy) Karin Knapp
24 Jul	Bank of the West Classic; Stanford, United States; Tier II event Hard – $600,000 – 28S/32Q/16D; Singles – Doubles	(Belgium) Kim Clijsters; 6–4, 6–2	(Switzerland) Patty Schnyder	(Czech Republic) Nicole Vaidišová (France) Tatiana Golovin	(Russia) Vera Zvonareva (Australia) Samantha Stosur (Germany) Anna-Lena Grönefeld (United States) Jill Craybas
24 Jul	Bank of the West Classic; Stanford, United States; Tier II event Hard – $600,000 – 28S/32Q/16D; Singles – Doubles	(Germany) Anna-Lena Grönefeld (Israel) Shahar Pe'er; 6–1, 6–4	(Italy) Maria Elena Camerin (Argentina) Gisela Dulko	(Czech Republic) Nicole Vaidišová (France) Tatiana Golovin	(Russia) Vera Zvonareva (Australia) Samantha Stosur (Germany) Anna-Lena Grönefeld (United States) Jill Craybas
24 Jul	Budapest Grand Prix; Budapest, Hungary; Tier IV event Clay – $145,000 – 32S/27Q/16D; Singles – Doubles	(Israel) Anna Smashnova; 6–1, 6–3	(Spain) Lourdes Domínguez Lino	(Germany) Martina Müller (Netherlands) Michaëlla Krajicek	(Colombia) Catalina Castaño (Czech Republic) Eva Birnerová (Italy) Romina Oprandi (Italy) Sara Errani
24 Jul	Budapest Grand Prix; Budapest, Hungary; Tier IV event Clay – $145,000 – 32S/27Q/16D; Singles – Doubles	(Slovakia) Janette Husárová (Netherlands) Michaëlla Krajicek; 4–6, 6–4, 6–4	(Czech Republic) Lucie Hradecká (Czech Republic) Renata Voráčová	(Germany) Martina Müller (Netherlands) Michaëlla Krajicek	(Colombia) Catalina Castaño (Czech Republic) Eva Birnerová (Italy) Romina Oprandi (Italy) Sara Errani
31 Jul	Acura Classic; San Diego, United States; Tier I event Hard – $1,340,000 – 56S/27Q/28D; Singles – Doubles	(Russia) Maria Sharapova; 7–5, 7–5	(Belgium) Kim Clijsters	(Czech Republic) Nicole Vaidišová (Switzerland) Patty Schnyder	(Switzerland) Martina Hingis (Russia) Anna Chakvetadze (Russia) Elena Dementieva (France) Mary Pierce
31 Jul	Acura Classic; San Diego, United States; Tier I event Hard – $1,340,000 – 56S/27Q/28D; Singles – Doubles	(Zimbabwe) Cara Black (Australia) Rennae Stubbs; 6–2, 6–2	(Germany) Anna-Lena Grönefeld (United States) Meghann Shaughnessy	(Czech Republic) Nicole Vaidišová (Switzerland) Patty Schnyder	(Switzerland) Martina Hingis (Russia) Anna Chakvetadze (Russia) Elena Dementieva (France) Mary Pierce

=== August ===
Week	Tournament	Champions	Runners-up	Semifinalists	Quarterfinalists
7 Aug	JPMorgan Chase Open; Carson, United States; Tier II event Hard – $600,000 – 56S/32Q/16D; Singles – Doubles	(Russia) Elena Dementieva; 6–3, 4–6, 6–4	(Serbia) Jelena Janković	(Russia) Maria Sharapova (United States) Serena Williams	(Russia) Dinara Safina (United States) Bethanie Mattek (Serbia) Ana Ivanovic (United States) Meghann Shaughnessy
7 Aug	JPMorgan Chase Open; Carson, United States; Tier II event Hard – $600,000 – 56S/32Q/16D; Singles – Doubles	(Spain) Virginia Ruano Pascual (Argentina) Paola Suárez; 6–3, 6–4	(Slovakia) Daniela Hantuchová (Japan) Ai Sugiyama	(Russia) Maria Sharapova (United States) Serena Williams	(Russia) Dinara Safina (United States) Bethanie Mattek (Serbia) Ana Ivanovic (United States) Meghann Shaughnessy
7 Aug	Nordea Nordic Light Open; Stockholm, Sweden; Tier IV event Hard – $145,000 – 32S/32Q/16D; Singles – Doubles	(China) Zheng Jie; 6–4, 6–1	(Russia) Anastasia Myskina	(Sweden) Sofia Arvidsson (Bulgaria) Tsvetana Pironkova	(Slovakia) Martina Suchá (Czech Republic) Eva Birnerová (Denmark) Caroline Wozniacki (China) Li Na
7 Aug	Nordea Nordic Light Open; Stockholm, Sweden; Tier IV event Hard – $145,000 – 32S/32Q/16D; Singles – Doubles	(Czech Republic) Eva Birnerová (Slovakia) Jarmila Gajdošová; 0–6, 6–4, 6–2	(China) Yan Zi (China) Zheng Jie	(Sweden) Sofia Arvidsson (Bulgaria) Tsvetana Pironkova	(Slovakia) Martina Suchá (Czech Republic) Eva Birnerová (Denmark) Caroline Wozniacki (China) Li Na
14 Aug	Rogers Cup; Montreal, Canada; Tier I event Hard – $1,340,000 – 56S/48Q/28D; Singles – Doubles	(Serbia) Ana Ivanovic; 6–2, 6–3	(Switzerland) Martina Hingis	(Russia) Dinara Safina (Russia) Anna Chakvetadze	(Slovenia) Katarina Srebotnik (Australia) Nicole Pratt (Russia) Svetlana Kuznetsova (Israel) Shahar Pe'er
14 Aug	Rogers Cup; Montreal, Canada; Tier I event Hard – $1,340,000 – 56S/48Q/28D; Singles – Doubles	(United States) Martina Navratilova (Russia) Nadia Petrova; 6–1, 6–2	(Zimbabwe) Cara Black (Germany) Anna-Lena Grönefeld	(Russia) Dinara Safina (Russia) Anna Chakvetadze	(Slovenia) Katarina Srebotnik (Australia) Nicole Pratt (Russia) Svetlana Kuznetsova (Israel) Shahar Pe'er
21 Aug	Pilot Pen Tennis; New Haven, United States; Tier II event Hard – $600,000 – 28S/32Q/16D; Singles – Doubles	(Belgium) Justine Henin-Hardenne; 6–0, 1–0 ret.	(United States) Lindsay Davenport	(Australia) Samantha Stosur (Russia) Svetlana Kuznetsova	(France) Amélie Mauresmo (France) Marion Bartoli (Russia) Elena Dementieva (Italy) Mara Santangelo
21 Aug	Pilot Pen Tennis; New Haven, United States; Tier II event Hard – $600,000 – 28S/32Q/16D; Singles – Doubles	(China) Yan Zi (China) Zheng Jie; 6–4, 6–2	(United States) Lisa Raymond (Australia) Samantha Stosur	(Australia) Samantha Stosur (Russia) Svetlana Kuznetsova	(France) Amélie Mauresmo (France) Marion Bartoli (Russia) Elena Dementieva (Italy) Mara Santangelo
21 Aug	Forest Hills Tennis Classic; Forest Hills, United States; Tier IV event Hard – $74,800 – 16S; Singles	(United States) Meghann Shaughnessy; 1–6, 6–0, 6–4	(Israel) Anna Smashnova	(Spain) Lourdes Domínguez Lino (Italy) Maria Elena Camerin	(Russia) Elena Vesnina (India) Sania Mirza (Slovakia) Martina Suchá (France) Séverine Brémond
28 Aug; 4 Sep	U.S. Open; New York City, United States; Grand Slam; Hard – $8,332,000 – 128S/96Q/64D/32X; Singles – Doubles – Mixed doubles	(Russia) Maria Sharapova; 6–4, 6–4	(Belgium) Justine Henin-Hardenne	(France) Amélie Mauresmo (Serbia) Jelena Janković	(Russia) Dinara Safina (France) Tatiana Golovin (Russia) Elena Dementieva (United States) Lindsay Davenport
28 Aug; 4 Sep	U.S. Open; New York City, United States; Grand Slam; Hard – $8,332,000 – 128S/96Q/64D/32X; Singles – Doubles – Mixed doubles	(France) Nathalie Dechy (Russia) Vera Zvonareva; 7–6^{(7–5)}, 7–5	(Russia) Dinara Safina (Slovenia) Katarina Srebotnik	(France) Amélie Mauresmo (Serbia) Jelena Janković	(Russia) Dinara Safina (France) Tatiana Golovin (Russia) Elena Dementieva (United States) Lindsay Davenport
28 Aug; 4 Sep	U.S. Open; New York City, United States; Grand Slam; Hard – $8,332,000 – 128S/96Q/64D/32X; Singles – Doubles – Mixed doubles	(United States) Bob Bryan (United States) Martina Navratilova; 6–2, 6–3	(Czech Republic) Martin Damm (Czech Republic) Květa Peschke	(France) Amélie Mauresmo (Serbia) Jelena Janković	(Russia) Dinara Safina (France) Tatiana Golovin (Russia) Elena Dementieva (United States) Lindsay Davenport

=== September ===
Week	Tournament	Champions	Runners-up	Semifinalists	Quarterfinalists
11 Sep	Fed Cup: Final; Charleroi, Belgium, Hard (i)	Italy; 3–2	Belgium		
11 Sep	Wismilak International; Bali, Indonesia; Tier III event Hard – $225,000 – 30S/11Q/13D; Singles – Doubles	(Russia) Svetlana Kuznetsova; 7–5, 6–2	(France) Marion Bartoli	(United States) Lindsay Davenport (Switzerland) Patty Schnyder	(France) Séverine Brémond (Czech Republic) Hana Šromová (Russia) Olga Puchkova (Hungary) Melinda Czink
11 Sep	Wismilak International; Bali, Indonesia; Tier III event Hard – $225,000 – 30S/11Q/13D; Singles – Doubles	(United States) Lindsay Davenport (United States) Corina Morariu; 6–3, 6–4	(South Africa) Natalie Grandin (Australia) Trudi Musgrave	(United States) Lindsay Davenport (Switzerland) Patty Schnyder	(France) Séverine Brémond (Czech Republic) Hana Šromová (Russia) Olga Puchkova (Hungary) Melinda Czink
18 Sep	China Open; Beijing, China; Tier II event Hard – $600,000 – 28S/32Q/16D; Singles – Doubles	(Russia) Svetlana Kuznetsova; 6–4, 6–0	(France) Amélie Mauresmo	(Serbia) Jelena Janković (China) Peng Shuai	(United States) Lindsay Davenport (Russia) Nadia Petrova (Japan) Ai Sugiyama (China) Li Na
18 Sep	China Open; Beijing, China; Tier II event Hard – $600,000 – 28S/32Q/16D; Singles – Doubles	(Spain) Virginia Ruano Pascual (Argentina) Paola Suárez; 6–2, 6–4	(Russia) Anna Chakvetadze (Russia) Elena Vesnina	(Serbia) Jelena Janković (China) Peng Shuai	(United States) Lindsay Davenport (Russia) Nadia Petrova (Japan) Ai Sugiyama (China) Li Na
18 Sep	Sunfeast Open; Kolkata, India; Tier III event Hard (i) – $175,000 – 32S/16Q/16D; Singles – Doubles	(Switzerland) Martina Hingis; 6–0, 6–4	(Russia) Olga Puchkova	(India) Sania Mirza (Uzbekistan) Iroda Tulyaganova	(Thailand) Tamarine Tanasugarn (France) Aravane Rezaï (Italy) Alberta Brianti (Russia) Alla Kudryavtseva
18 Sep	Sunfeast Open; Kolkata, India; Tier III event Hard (i) – $175,000 – 32S/16Q/16D; Singles – Doubles	(South Africa) Liezel Huber (India) Sania Mirza; 6–4, 6–0	(Ukraine) Yuliya Beygelzimer (Ukraine) Yuliana Fedak	(India) Sania Mirza (Uzbekistan) Iroda Tulyaganova	(Thailand) Tamarine Tanasugarn (France) Aravane Rezaï (Italy) Alberta Brianti (Russia) Alla Kudryavtseva
18 Sep	Banka Koper Slovenia Open; Portorož, Slovenia; Tier IV event Hard – $145,000 – 32S/32Q/16D; Singles draw – Doubles draw	(Austria) Tamira Paszek; 7–5, 6–1	(Italy) Maria Elena Camerin	(Italy) Tathiana Garbin (France) Émilie Loit	(Slovakia) Martina Suchá (Germany) Martina Müller (Slovenia) Andreja Klepač (Slovakia) Jarmila Gajdošová
18 Sep	Banka Koper Slovenia Open; Portorož, Slovenia; Tier IV event Hard – $145,000 – 32S/32Q/16D; Singles draw – Doubles draw	(Czech Republic) Lucie Hradecká (Czech Republic) Renata Voráčová; Walkover	(Czech Republic) Eva Birnerová (France) Émilie Loit	(Italy) Tathiana Garbin (France) Émilie Loit	(Slovakia) Martina Suchá (Germany) Martina Müller (Slovenia) Andreja Klepač (Slovakia) Jarmila Gajdošová
25 Sep	Fortis Championships Luxembourg; Kockelscheuer, Luxembourg; Tier II event Hard (i) – $600,000 – 28S/32Q/16D; Singles – Doubles	(Ukraine) Alona Bondarenko; 6–3, 6–2	(Italy) Francesca Schiavone	(Poland) Agnieszka Radwańska (Czech Republic) Květa Peschke	(Russia) Elena Dementieva (Switzerland) Patty Schnyder (Russia) Dinara Safina (France) Nathalie Dechy
25 Sep	Fortis Championships Luxembourg; Kockelscheuer, Luxembourg; Tier II event Hard (i) – $600,000 – 28S/32Q/16D; Singles – Doubles	(Czech Republic) Květa Peschke (Italy) Francesca Schiavone; 2–6, 6–4, 6–1	(Germany) Anna-Lena Grönefeld (South Africa) Liezel Huber	(Poland) Agnieszka Radwańska (Czech Republic) Květa Peschke	(Russia) Elena Dementieva (Switzerland) Patty Schnyder (Russia) Dinara Safina (France) Nathalie Dechy
25 Sep	Guangzhou International; Guangzhou, China; Tier III event Hard – $175,000 – 32S/16Q/16D; Singles – Doubles	(Russia) Anna Chakvetadze; 6–1, 6–4	(Spain) Anabel Medina Garrigues	(Serbia) Jelena Janković (Israel) Tzipora Obziler	(Australia) Alicia Molik (Russia) Olga Puchkova (China) Chen Yanchong (China) Li Na
25 Sep	Guangzhou International; Guangzhou, China; Tier III event Hard – $175,000 – 32S/16Q/16D; Singles – Doubles	(China) Li Na (China) Sun Tiantian; 6–4, 2–6, 7–5	(United States) Vania King (Croatia) Jelena Kostanić	(Serbia) Jelena Janković (Israel) Tzipora Obziler	(Australia) Alicia Molik (Russia) Olga Puchkova (China) Chen Yanchong (China) Li Na
25 Sep	Hansol Korea Open Tennis Championships; Seoul, South Korea; Tier IV event Hard – $145,000 – 32S/27Q/16D; Singles – Doubles	(Greece) Eleni Daniilidou; 6–3, 2–6, 7–6^{(7–3)}	(Japan) Ai Sugiyama	(Spain) Virginia Ruano Pascual (France) Marion Bartoli	(India) Sania Mirza (Argentina) Paola Suárez (Japan) Akiko Morigami (Russia) Vera Zvonareva
25 Sep	Hansol Korea Open Tennis Championships; Seoul, South Korea; Tier IV event Hard – $145,000 – 32S/27Q/16D; Singles – Doubles	(Spain) Virginia Ruano Pascual (Argentina) Paola Suárez; 6–2, 6–3	(Chinese Taipei) Chuang Chia-jung (Argentina) Mariana Díaz Oliva	(Spain) Virginia Ruano Pascual (France) Marion Bartoli	(India) Sania Mirza (Argentina) Paola Suárez (Japan) Akiko Morigami (Russia) Vera Zvonareva

=== October ===
Week	Tournament	Champions	Runners-up	Semifinalists	Quarterfinalists
2 Oct	Porsche Tennis Grand Prix; Stuttgart, Germany; Tier II event Hard (i) – $650,000 – 28S/32Q/16D; Singles – Doubles	(Russia) Nadia Petrova; 6–3,7–6^{(7–4)}	(France) Tatiana Golovin	(Switzerland) Patty Schnyder (Russia) Svetlana Kuznetsova	(Netherlands) Michaëlla Krajicek (Russia) Elena Dementieva (Slovakia) Daniela Hantuchová (Serbia) Jelena Janković
2 Oct	Porsche Tennis Grand Prix; Stuttgart, Germany; Tier II event Hard (i) – $650,000 – 28S/32Q/16D; Singles – Doubles	(United States) Lisa Raymond (Australia) Samantha Stosur; 6–3, 6–4	(Zimbabwe) Cara Black (Australia) Rennae Stubbs	(Switzerland) Patty Schnyder (Russia) Svetlana Kuznetsova	(Netherlands) Michaëlla Krajicek (Russia) Elena Dementieva (Slovakia) Daniela Hantuchová (Serbia) Jelena Janković
2 Oct	Japan Open Tennis Championships; Tokyo, Japan; Tier III event Hard – $175,000 – 32S/32Q/16D; Singles – Doubles	(France) Marion Bartoli; 2–6, 6–2, 6–2	(Japan) Aiko Nakamura	(France) Camille Pin (Chinese Taipei) Chan Yung-jan	(Japan) Junri Namigata (France) Youlia Fedossova (United States) Jamea Jackson (Japan) Ai Sugiyama
2 Oct	Japan Open Tennis Championships; Tokyo, Japan; Tier III event Hard – $175,000 – 32S/32Q/16D; Singles – Doubles	(United States) Vania King (Croatia) Jelena Kostanić; 7–6^{(7–2)}, 5–7, 6–2	(Chinese Taipei) Chan Yung-jan (Chinese Taipei) Chuang Chia-jung	(France) Camille Pin (Chinese Taipei) Chan Yung-jan	(Japan) Junri Namigata (France) Youlia Fedossova (United States) Jamea Jackson (Japan) Ai Sugiyama
2 Oct	Tashkent Open; Tashkent, Uzbekistan; Tier IV event Hard – $145,000 – 32S/16Q/16D; Singles – Doubles	(China) Sun Tiantian; 6–2, 6–4	(Uzbekistan) Iroda Tulyaganova	(Belarus) Victoria Azarenka (Russia) Olga Puchkova	(Italy) Maria Elena Camerin (Russia) Anastasia Rodionova (India) Sania Mirza (Ukraine) Kateryna Bondarenko
2 Oct	Tashkent Open; Tashkent, Uzbekistan; Tier IV event Hard – $145,000 – 32S/16Q/16D; Singles – Doubles	(Belarus) Victoria Azarenka (Belarus) Tatiana Poutchek; Walkover	(Italy) Maria Elena Camerin (Switzerland) Emmanuelle Gagliardi	(Belarus) Victoria Azarenka (Russia) Olga Puchkova	(Italy) Maria Elena Camerin (Russia) Anastasia Rodionova (India) Sania Mirza (Ukraine) Kateryna Bondarenko
9 Oct	Kremlin Cup; Moscow, Russia; Tier I event Carpet (i) – $1,340,000 – 28S/32Q/16D; Singles – Doubles	(Russia) Anna Chakvetadze; 6–4, 6–4	(Russia) Nadia Petrova	(Czech Republic) Nicole Vaidišová (Russia) Elena Dementieva	(France) Amélie Mauresmo (Russia) Vera Zvonareva (Switzerland) Patty Schnyder (Russia) Maria Sharapova
9 Oct	Kremlin Cup; Moscow, Russia; Tier I event Carpet (i) – $1,340,000 – 28S/32Q/16D; Singles – Doubles	(Czech Republic) Květa Peschke (Italy) Francesca Schiavone; 6–4,6–7^{(4–7)}, 6–1	(Czech Republic) Iveta Benešová (Russia) Galina Voskoboeva	(Czech Republic) Nicole Vaidišová (Russia) Elena Dementieva	(France) Amélie Mauresmo (Russia) Vera Zvonareva (Switzerland) Patty Schnyder (Russia) Maria Sharapova
9 Oct	PTT Bangkok Open; Bangkok, Thailand; Tier III event Hard – $200,000 – 32S/32Q/16D; Singles – Doubles	(United States) Vania King; 2–6, 6–4, 6–4	(Thailand) Tamarine Tanasugarn	(France) Séverine Brémond (United States) Meghann Shaughnessy	(Austria) Sybille Bammer (Greece) Eleni Daniilidou (Croatia) Jelena Kostanić (Japan) Aiko Nakamura
9 Oct	PTT Bangkok Open; Bangkok, Thailand; Tier III event Hard – $200,000 – 32S/32Q/16D; Singles – Doubles	(United States) Vania King (Croatia) Jelena Kostanić; 7–5, 2–6, 7–5	(Argentina) Mariana Díaz Oliva (South Africa) Natalie Grandin	(France) Séverine Brémond (United States) Meghann Shaughnessy	(Austria) Sybille Bammer (Greece) Eleni Daniilidou (Croatia) Jelena Kostanić (Japan) Aiko Nakamura
16 Oct	Zurich Open; Zürich, Switzerland; Tier I event Hard (i) – $1,340,000 – 28S/32Q/16D; Singles – Doubles	(Russia) Maria Sharapova; 6–1, 4–6, 6–3	(Slovakia) Daniela Hantuchová	(Russia) Svetlana Kuznetsova (Slovenia) Katarina Srebotnik	(France) Amélie Mauresmo (Switzerland) Martina Hingis (Russia) Maria Kirilenko (Switzerland) Timea Bacsinszky
16 Oct	Zurich Open; Zürich, Switzerland; Tier I event Hard (i) – $1,340,000 – 28S/32Q/16D; Singles – Doubles	(Zimbabwe) Cara Black (Australia) Rennae Stubbs; 7–5, 7–5	(South Africa) Liezel Huber (Slovenia) Katarina Srebotnik	(Russia) Svetlana Kuznetsova (Slovenia) Katarina Srebotnik	(France) Amélie Mauresmo (Switzerland) Martina Hingis (Russia) Maria Kirilenko (Switzerland) Timea Bacsinszky
23 Oct	Generali Ladies Linz; Linz, Austria; Tier II event Hard (i) – $600,000 – 28S/32Q/16D; Singles – Doubles	(Russia) Maria Sharapova; 7–5, 6–2	(Russia) Nadia Petrova	(Switzerland) Patty Schnyder (Czech Republic) Nicole Vaidišová	(Serbia) Ana Ivanovic (Russia) Vera Zvonareva (Serbia) Jelena Janković (Australia) Samantha Stosur
23 Oct	Generali Ladies Linz; Linz, Austria; Tier II event Hard (i) – $600,000 – 28S/32Q/16D; Singles – Doubles	(United States) Lisa Raymond (Australia) Samantha Stosur; 6–3, 6–0	(United States) Corina Morariu (Slovenia) Katarina Srebotnik	(Switzerland) Patty Schnyder (Czech Republic) Nicole Vaidišová	(Serbia) Ana Ivanovic (Russia) Vera Zvonareva (Serbia) Jelena Janković (Australia) Samantha Stosur
30 Oct	Bell Challenge; Quebec City, Canada; Tier III event Carpet (i) – $175,000 – 32S/32Q/16D; Singles – Doubles	(France) Marion Bartoli; 6–0, 6–0	(Russia) Olga Puchkova	(France) Séverine Brémond (United States) Lilia Osterloh	(Serbia) Jelena Janković (Slovakia) Martina Suchá (Canada) Aleksandra Wozniak (United States) Shenay Perry
30 Oct	Bell Challenge; Quebec City, Canada; Tier III event Carpet (i) – $175,000 – 32S/32Q/16D; Singles – Doubles	(United States) Laura Granville (United States) Carly Gullickson; 6–3, 6–4	(United States) Jill Craybas (Russia) Alina Jidkova	(France) Séverine Brémond (United States) Lilia Osterloh	(Serbia) Jelena Janković (Slovakia) Martina Suchá (Canada) Aleksandra Wozniak (United States) Shenay Perry
30 Oct	Gaz de France Stars; Hasselt, Belgium; Tier III event Hard (i) – $175,000 – 32S/32Q/16D; Singles draw – Doubles draw	(Belgium) Kim Clijsters; 6–3, 3–6, 6–4	(Estonia) Kaia Kanepi	(Russia) Vera Zvonareva (Netherlands) Michaëlla Krajicek	(Germany) Sandra Klösel (France) Aravane Rezaï (Serbia) Ana Ivanovic (Italy) Francesca Schiavone
30 Oct	Gaz de France Stars; Hasselt, Belgium; Tier III event Hard (i) – $175,000 – 32S/32Q/16D; Singles draw – Doubles draw	(United States) Lisa Raymond (Australia) Samantha Stosur; 6–2, 6–3	(Greece) Eleni Daniilidou (Germany) Jasmin Wöhr	(Russia) Vera Zvonareva (Netherlands) Michaëlla Krajicek	(Germany) Sandra Klösel (France) Aravane Rezaï (Serbia) Ana Ivanovic (Italy) Francesca Schiavone

=== November ===
Week	Tournament	Champions	Runners-up	Semifinalists	Quarterfinalists
6 Nov	WTA Tour Championships; Madrid, Spain; Year-end Championship; Hard – $3,000,000 – 8S (round robin)/4D; Singles – Doubles	(Belgium) Justine Henin-Hardenne; 6–4, 6–3	(France) Amélie Mauresmo	(Belgium) Kim Clijsters (Russia) Maria Sharapova	(Switzerland) Martina Hingis (Russia) Nadia Petrova (Russia) Svetlana Kuznetsova (Russia) Elena Dementieva
6 Nov	WTA Tour Championships; Madrid, Spain; Year-end Championship; Hard – $3,000,000 – 8S (round robin)/4D; Singles – Doubles	(United States) Lisa Raymond (Australia) Samantha Stosur; 3–6, 6–3, 6–3	(Zimbabwe) Cara Black (Australia) Rennae Stubbs	(Belgium) Kim Clijsters (Russia) Maria Sharapova	(Switzerland) Martina Hingis (Russia) Nadia Petrova (Russia) Svetlana Kuznetsova (Russia) Elena Dementieva

=== Calendar and other changes ===
- The French Open main draw began play on Sunday rather than the traditional Monday start, making it a 15-day tournament. Prize money between the men and women was also made equal for the first time.
- Two new events were created: the Bangalore Open in Bangalore, India, replacing the previous event held in Hyderabad; and the Anda Open in Tel Aviv, Israel—later cancelled due to the 2006 Lebanon War.
- The Advanta Championships was removed from the calendar.
- The Porsche Tennis Grand Prix was moved from its previous home of Filderstadt to Stuttgart.
- The WTA Tour Championships were held in Madrid, Spain for the first time, having spent several years in Los Angeles. It stayed there for the 2007 season.
- The four Grand Slam tournaments and Miami were made into mandatory events, meaning all players that qualified by ranking had to play them or they received a "zero-pointer" on their ranking.
- Prize money of the standard Tiers was raised slightly: Tier I was now $40,000 higher, Tier II was $15,000 higher, and Tier III and IV both $5,000 higher.
- The previous Tier V category was completely abolished.
- Bonus points, where previously a player could receive extra points in addition to their round points depending on the ranking of the opponent they beat, were also abolished.
- Also in 2006, the WTA began experimenting with on-court coaching, allowing players to call their coach onto the court for advice between sets. It was tested in five events during 2006, and continued in the 2007 season.
- Electronic line calling, or "Hawk-Eye", was premiered during the season. The Sony Ericsson Open was the first event to utilise the new technology. Later that year, the U.S. Open became the first Grand Slam to use it. It has since been used in every Grand Slam tournament except the French Open (the ball leaves a mark on the clay, therefore it is not thought to be necessary.)

== Statistics ==
List of players and titles won, last name alphabetically:

- (Belgium) Justine Henin-Hardenne – Sydney, Dubai, French Open, Eastbourne, New Haven and WTA Tour Championships (6)
- (Russia) Nadia Petrova – Doha, Amelia Island, Charleston, Berlin and Stuttgart (5)
- (Russia) Maria Sharapova – Indian Wells, San Diego, U.S. Open, Zurich and Linz (5)
- (France) Amélie Mauresmo – Australian Open, Paris, Antwerp and Wimbledon (4)
- (France) Marion Bartoli – Auckland, Tokyo and Quebec City (3)
- (Belgium) Kim Clijsters – Warsaw, Stanford and Hasselt (3)
- (Russia) Svetlana Kuznetsova – Miami, Bali and Beijing (3)
- (Israel) Shahar Pe'er – Pattaya City, Prague and Istanbul (3)
- (Russia) Anna Chakvetadze – Guangzhou and Moscow (2)
- (Russia) Elena Dementieva – Tokyo and Los Angeles (2)
- (Switzerland) Martina Hingis – Rome and Kolkata (2)
- (Netherlands) Michaëlla Krajicek – Hobart and 's-Hertogenbosch (2)
- (Spain) Anabel Medina Garrigues – Canberra and Palermo (2)
- (United States) Meghann Shaughnessy – Rabat and Forest Hills (2)
- (China) Zheng Jie – Estoril and Stockholm (2)
- (Russia) Vera Zvonareva – Birmingham and Cincinnati (2)
- (Sweden) Sofia Arvidsson – Memphis (1)
- (Ukraine) Alona Bondarenko – Luxembourg (1)
- (Greece) Eleni Daniilidou – Seoul (1)
- (Spain) Lourdes Domínguez Lino – Bogotá (1)
- (Germany) Anna-Lena Grönefeld – Acapulco (1)
- (Serbia) Ana Ivanovic – Montréal (1)
- (United States) Vania King – Bangkok (1)
- (Austria) Tamira Paszek – Portorož (1)
- (Czech Republic) Lucie Šafářová – Gold Coast (1)
- (Italy) Mara Santangelo – Bangalore (1)
- (Israel) Anna Smashnova – Budapest (1)
- (China) Sun Tiantian – Tashkent (1)
- (Czech Republic) Nicole Vaidišová – Strasbourg (1)

The following players won their first title:

- (France) Marion Bartoli – Auckland
- (Israel) Shahar Pe'er – Pattaya City
- (Italy) Mara Santangelo – Bangalore
- (Sweden) Sofia Arvidsson – Memphis
- (Spain) Lourdes Domínguez Lino – Bogotá
- (Germany) Anna-Lena Grönefeld – Acapulco
- (Austria) Tamira Paszek – Portorož
- (Ukraine) Alona Bondarenko – Luxembourg
- (Russia) Anna Chakvetadze – Guangzhou
- (China) Sun Tiantian – Tashkent
- (United States) Vania King – Bangkok

Titles won by nation:

- Russia – 18 (Tokyo, Indian Wells, Miami, Amelia Island, Charleston, Berlin, Birmingham, Cincinnati, San Diego, Los Angeles, U.S. Open, Bali, Beijing, Guangzhou, Stuttgart, Moscow, Zurich and Linz)
- Belgium – 9 (Sydney, Dubai, Warsaw, French Open, Eastbourne, Stanford, New Haven, Hasselt and WTA Tour Championships)
- France – 7 (Auckland, Australian Open, Paris, Antwerp, Wimbledon, Tokyo and Quebec City)
- Israel – 4 (Pattaya City, Prague, Istanbul and Budapest)
- China – 3 (Estoril, Stockholm and Tashkent)
- Spain – 3 (Canberra, Bogotá and Palermo)
- United States – 3 (Rabat, Forest Hills and Bangkok)
- Czech Republic – 2 (Gold Coast and Strasbourg)
- Netherlands – 2 (Hobart and 's-Hertogenbosch)
- Switzerland – 2 (Rome and Kolkata)
- Austria – 1 (Portorož)
- Germany – 1 (Acapulco)
- Greece – 1 (Seoul)
- Italy – 1 (Bangalore)
- Serbia – 1 (Montréal)
- Sweden – 1 (Memphis)
- Ukraine – 1 (Luxembourg)

== Rankings ==
Below are the 2006 WTA year-end rankings in both singles and doubles competition:

Singles Year-end Ranking
No	Player Name	Points	2005	Change
1	Justine Henin-Hardenne (BEL)	3,998	6	+5
2	Maria Sharapova (RUS)	3,532	4	+2
3	Amélie Mauresmo (FRA)	3,391	3	=
4	Svetlana Kuznetsova (RUS)	2,523	18	+14
5	Kim Clijsters (BEL)	2,215	2	-3
6	Nadia Petrova (RUS)	2,189	9	+3
7	Martina Hingis (SUI)	2,018	NR	N/A
8	Elena Dementieva (RUS)	1,875	8	=
9	Patty Schnyder (SUI)	1,578	7	-2
10	Nicole Vaidišová (CZE)	1,391	15	+5
11	Dinara Safina (RUS)	1,390	20	+9
12	Jelena Janković (SRB)	1,211	22	+10
13	Anna Chakvetadze (RUS)	1,144	33	+20
14	Ana Ivanovic (SRB)	1,053	16	+2
15	Francesca Schiavone (ITA)	1,032	13	-2
16	Anastasia Myskina (RUS)	1,000	14	-2
17	Daniela Hantuchová (SVK)	986	19	+2
18	Marion Bartoli (FRA)	951	40	+22
19	Anna-Lena Grönefeld (GER)	922	21	+2
20	Shahar Pe'er (ISR)	894	45	+25

Doubles Year-end Ranking
No	Player Name	Points	2005	Change
1	Lisa Raymond (USA)	3,858	3	+2
1	Samantha Stosur (AUS)	3,858	2	+1
3	Zheng Jie (CHN)	2,996	30	+27
4	Yan Zi (CHN)	2,996	31	+27
5	Cara Black (ZIM)	2,516	1	-4
6	Rennae Stubbs (AUS)	2,501	5	-1
7	Katarina Srebotnik (SLO)	2,242	25	+18
8	Květa Peschke (CZE)	2,193	16	+8
9	Francesca Schiavone (ITA)	2,094	34	+25
10	Virginia Ruano Pascual (ESP)	2,076	4	-6
11	Anna-Lena Grönefeld (GER)	1,799	11	=
12	Ai Sugiyama (JPN)	1,772	14	+2
13	Daniela Hantuchová (SVK)	1,766	13	=
14	Paola Suárez (ARG)	1,742	17	+3
15	Meghann Shaughnessy (USA)	1,663	19	+4
16	Dinara Safina (RUS)	1,632	28	+12
17	Liezel Huber (RSA)	1,593	6	-11
18	Vera Zvonareva (RUS)	1,524	10	-8
19	Anabel Medina Garrigues (ESP)	1,315	20	+1
20	Nathalie Dechy (FRA)	1,277	103	+83

=== Singles number 1 ranking ===
Holder	Date gained	Date forfeited
Lindsay Davenport (USA)	Year-End 2005	29 January 2006
Kim Clijsters (BEL)	30 January 2006	19 March 2006
Amélie Mauresmo (FRA)	20 March 2006	12 November 2006
Justine Henin-Hardenne (BEL)	13 November 2006	Year-End 2006

=== Points distribution ===
Category	W	F	SF	QF	R16	R32	R64	R128	Q	Q3	Q2	Q1
Grand Slam (S)	700	492	314	174	96	62	38	2	31	25	15	2
Grand Slam (D)	700	492	314	174	96	62	2	–	24	–	–	–
WTA Championships (S)	525	369	235	130	72	–	–	–	–	–	–	–
WTA Championships (D)	525	369	235	130	–	–	–	–	–	–	–	–
Tier I $3,000,000 (S)	350	246	157	87	48	31	19	1	15.5	–	7.5	1
Tier I $3,000,000 (D)	350	246	157	87	48	1	–	–	21.5	–	–	–
Tier I $2,000,000 (S)	325	228	146	81	45	28	16	1	11	–	6.25	1
Tier I $2,000,000 (D)	325	228	146	81	45	1	–	–	20	–	–	–
Tier I $1,340,000 (56S)	300	210	135	75	42	25	1	–	10.5	–	5.75	1
Tier I $1,340,000 (28S)	300	210	135	75	42	1	–	–	18.5	10.5	5.75	1
Tier I $1,340,000 (28D)	300	210	135	75	42	1	–	–	18.5	–	–	–
Tier I $1,340,000 (16D)	300	210	135	75	1	–	–	–	19	–	–	–
Tier II $650,000 (28S)	220	154	99	55	29	1	–	–	13.25	7.75	4.5	1
Tier II $650,000 (16D)	220	154	99	55	1	–	–	–	13	–	–	–
Tier II $600,000 (56S)	195	137	88	49	25	14	1	–	6.75	–	4	1
Tier II $600,000 (28/32S)	195	137	88	49	25	1	–	–	11.75	6.75	4	1
Tier II $600,000 (16D)	195	137	88	49	1	–	–	–	11.75	–	–	–
Tier III $225,000 (30S)	145	103	66	37	19	1	–	–	4.5	–	2.75	1
Tier III $225,000 (13D)	145	103	66	37	1	–	–	–	–	–	–	–
Tier III $175,000 (56S)	120	85	55	30	16	9	1	–	3.75	–	2.25	1
Tier III $175,000 (30/32S, 32Q)	120	85	55	30	16	1	–	–	7.25	3.75	2.25	1
Tier III $175,000 (30/32S, 16Q)	120	85	55	30	16	1	–	–	3.75	–	2.25	1
Tier III $175,000 (16D)	120	85	55	30	1	–	–	–	7.5	–	–	–
Tier IV $145,000 (32S, 32Q)	95	67	43	24	12	1	–	–	5.5	3.5	2	1
Tier IV $145,000 (32S, 16Q)	95	67	43	24	12	1	–	–	3.5	–	2	1
Tier IV $145,000 (16S, 16D)	95	67	43	24	1	–	–	–	6.25	–	–	–

== See also ==
- 2006 ATP Tour
- WTA Tour
- List of female tennis players
- List of tennis tournaments
