= 2006 Richard Luton Properties Canberra International =

Tennis tournament in Canberra, Australia

- Date: 9–15 January
- Edition: 6th
- Category: WTA Tier IV
- Draw: 32S / 16D
- Prize money: US$145,000
- Surface: Hard (Rebound Ace)
- Location: Canberra, Australia
- Venue: Domain Tennis Centre

Champions

Singles
- (Spain) Anabel Medina Garrigues

Doubles
- (Poland) Marta Domachowska / (Italy) Roberta Vinci
- Canberra International

The 2006 Richard Luton Properties Canberra International was a women's tennis tournament played on outdoor hard courts. It was the sixth edition of the tournament, and part of the WTA Tier IV tournaments of the 2006 WTA Tour. It took place at the Domain Tennis Centre in Canberra, Australia, from 9 to 15 January 2006. First-seeded Anabel Medina Garrigues won the singles title.

== Finals ==
=== Singles ===
(Spain) Anabel Medina Garrigues defeated (South Korea) Cho Yoon-jeong, 6–4, 0–6, 6–4

- It was Medina Garrigues' 1st WTA singles title of the year and the 5th of her career.

=== Doubles ===
(Poland) Marta Domachowska / (Italy) Roberta Vinci defeated (United Kingdom) Claire Curran / (Latvia) Līga Dekmeijere, 7–6^{(7–5)}, 6–3

- It was the 1st career WTA doubles title for Domachowska, while Vinci won her third title in the category.

== Singles main-draw entrants ==
=== Seeds ===
Country	Player	Rank^{1}	Seed
ESP	Anabel Medina Garrigues	32	1
FRA	~~Marion Bartoli~~	33	2
CZE	~~Lucie Šafářová~~	42	3
ISR	Shahar Pe'er	45	4
ITA	Roberta Vinci	51	5
COL	Catalina Castaño	54	6
POL	Marta Domachowska	56	7
SWE	Sofia Arvidsson	58	8
FRA	Virginie Razzano	59	9

- ^{1} Rankings are as of 2 January 2006

=== Other entrants ===
The following players received wildcards into the singles main draw:

- (Australia) Sophie Ferguson
- (Australia) Shayna McDowell

The following players received entry from the qualifying draw:

- (Czech Republic) Eva Hrdinová
- (Finland) Emma Laine
- (Belarus) Tatiana Poutchek
- (Russia) Anastasia Rodionova

The following players received entry as a lucky loser:

- (Switzerland) Emmanuelle Gagliardi
- (Austria) Yvonne Meusburger

=== Withdrawals ===
Before the tournament

- (France) Marion Bartoli
- (Australia) Jelena Dokic
- (Czech Republic) Lucie Šafářová
