= 2006 Internationaux de Strasbourg =

- Date: 22–28 May
- Edition: 20st
- Category: Tier III
- Draw: 30S / 16D
- Prize money: $175,000
- Surface: Clay / outdoor
- Location: Strasbourg, France
- Venue: Centre Sportif de Hautepierre

Champions

Singles
- (Czech Republic) Nicole Vaidišová

Doubles
- (South Africa) Liezel Huber / (United States) Martina Navratilova
- Internationaux de Strasbourg

The 2006 Internationaux de Strasbourg was a women's tennis tournament played on outdoor clay courts. It was the 20th edition of the Internationaux de Strasbourg, and was part of the Tier III category of the 2006 WTA Tour. The tournament took place at the Centre Sportif de Hautepierre in Strasbourg, France, from 22 May until 28 May 2006. Second-seeded Nicole Vaidišová won the singles title and earned $28,000 first-prize money.

== Finals ==
=== Singles ===
(Czech Republic) Nicole Vaidišová defeated (China) Peng Shuai 7–6^{(9–7)}, 6–3

- It was Vaidišová's only singles title of the year and the 6th and last of her career.

=== Doubles ===
(South Africa) Liezel Huber / (United States) Martina Navratilova defeated (Germany) Martina Müller / (Romania) Andreea Vanc 6–2, 7–6^{(7–1)}
