= 2006 Porsche Tennis Grand Prix =

- Date: 2–8 October
- Edition: 29th
- Category: Tier II
- Draw: 28S / 16D
- Prize money: $650,000
- Surface: Hard (Greenset) / indoor
- Location: Stuttgart, Germany
- Venue: Porsche-Arena

Champions

Singles
- (Russia) Nadia Petrova

Doubles
- (United States) Lisa Raymond / (Australia) Samantha Stosur
- Porsche Tennis Grand Prix

The 2006 Porsche Tennis Grand Prix was a women's tennis tournament played on indoor hard courts that was part of the Tier II category of the 2006 WTA Tour. The event was relocated to the Porsche-Arena in Stuttgart, Germany after having held all previous editions in Filderstadt. It was the 29th edition of the tournament and was played from 2 October until 8 October 2006. Fourth-seeded Nadia Petrova won the singles title and earned $100,000 first-prize money.

== Finals ==
=== Singles ===
(Russia) Nadia Petrova defeated (France) Tatiana Golovin 6–3, 7–6^{(7–4)}

- It was Petrova's 5th singles title of the year and the 6th of her career.

=== Doubles ===
(United States) Lisa Raymond / (Australia) Samantha Stosur defeated (Zimbabwe) Cara Black / (Russia) Rennae Stubbs 6–3, 6–4

== Prize money ==
Event	W	F	SF	QF	Round of 16	Round of 32
Singles	$100,000	$53,560	$28,750	$15,400	$8,230	$4,400
