= 2006 Gaz de France Stars =

- Date: 30 October – 5 November
- Edition: 3rd
- Category: Tier III
- Draw: 32S / 16D
- Prize money: $175,000
- Surface: Hard / indoor
- Location: Hasselt, Belgium

Champions

Singles
- (Belgium) Kim Clijsters

Doubles
- (United States) Lisa Raymond / (Australia) Samantha Stosur
← 2005 ·	Gaz de France Stars

The 2006 Gaz de France Stars, also known as the Hasselt Cup, was a women's tennis tournament played on indoor hard courts. It was the 3rd edition of the Gaz de France Stars, and was part of the Tier III category of the 2006 WTA Tour. It took place in Hasselt, Belgium, in late October and early November, 2006. First-seeded Kim Clijsters won the singles title.

== Finals ==
=== Singles ===
(Belgium) Kim Clijsters defeated (Estonia) Kaia Kanepi, 6–3, 3–6, 6–4

- It was Clijsters' 3rd and last singles title of the year and the 33rd of her career.

=== Doubles ===
(United States) Lisa Raymond / (Australia) Samantha Stosur defeated (Greece) Eleni Daniilidou / (Germany) Jasmin Wöhr, 6–2, 6–3

- It was Raymond's 9th doubles title of the year and the 59th of her career. It was Stosur's 9th doubles title of the year and the 16th of her career.
