= Soetkin Van Deun =

Belgian tennis player

- Country (sports): Belgium
- Born: 6 August 1988 (age 37) Antwerp, Belgium
- Plays: Right-handed
- Prize money: US$ 12,376

Singles
- Highest ranking: No. 528 (28 July 2008)

Doubles
- Highest ranking: No. 770 (23 June 2008)

Soetkin Van Deun (born 6 September 1988) is a former professional tennis player from Belgium. On 28 July 2008, she reached her highest WTA singles ranking of 528.

Her only WTA Tour main-draw appearance came at the Gaz de France Stars where she partnered Jessie de Vries in the doubles event. They lost in the first round to Luxembourgish Anne Kremer and French Virginie Razzano.

Received a degree in economics from KU Leuven university. She works in the accounting department of Ravago in Arendonk.
