= 2006 Richard Luton Properties Canberra International – Doubles =

Women's tennis tournament in Canberra, Australia

Doubles
- 2006 Richard Luton Properties Canberra International

Final
- Champions: (Poland) Marta Domachowska (Italy) Roberta Vinci
- Runners-up: (United Kingdom) Claire Curran (Latvia) Līga Dekmeijere
- Score: 7–6^{(7–5)}, 6–3

Details
- Draw: 16
- Seeds: 4

Events
Singles	Doubles
- Canberra International

Tathiana Garbin and Tina Križan were the defending champions, but Križan decided to play at the 2006 Medibank International instead, which was held during the same week. Garbin played with Emmanuelle Gagliardi, but the team lost in the semifinals.

The third-seeded team of Marta Domachowska and Roberta Vinci won the title, defeating Claire Curran and Līga Dekmeijere in the final in straight sets.

== Seeds ==
1. (Greece) Eleni Daniilidou / (Spain) Anabel Medina Garrigues (quarterfinals, retired)
2. (Switzerland) Emmanuelle Gagliardi / (Italy) Tathiana Garbin (semifinals)
3. (Poland) Marta Domachowska / (Italy) Roberta Vinci (champions)
4. (United Kingdom) Claire Curran / (Latvia) Līga Dekmeijere (finals, runners-up)

== Draw ==
Key

- Q = Qualifier
- WC = Wild card
- LL = Lucky loser
- Alt = Alternate
- ITF = ITF entry
- PR = Protected ranking
- SR = Special ranking
- SE = Special exempt
- JE = Junior exempt
- JR = Junior Accelerator Programme entrant
- CO = College Accelerator Programme entrant
- NG = Next Gen Accelerator Program entrant
- w/o = Walkover
- r = Retired
- d = Defaulted

=== Draw ===
First round
1	(Greece) E Daniilidou (Spain) A Medina Garrigues	6	6
(Colombia) C Castaño (Hungary) M Czink	4	4
WC	(Australia) M Adamczak (Australia) C Horiatopoulos	2	6	5
(France) V Razzano (Italy) An Serra Zanetti	6	4	7
4	(United Kingdom) C Curran (Latvia) L Dekmeijere	7	7
(Croatia) I Abramović (Belarus) T Poutchek	5	6^{3}
(Japan) A Nakamura (Japan) S Obata	4	7	7
Q	(Sweden) S Arvidsson (Austria) S Bammer	6	5	6^{3}
(Australia) S Ferguson (Australia) T Musgrave	2	2
(Japan) R Fuda (Japan) S Okamoto	6	6
(Brazil) MF Alves (Portugal) F Piedade	1	0
3	(Poland) M Domachowska (Italy) R Vinci	6	6
(Finland) E Laine (Tunisia) S Sfar	6	4	3
(Germany) J Schruff (Germany) J Wöhr	3	6	6
(United States) V King (Romania) A Perianu	4	1	r
2	(Switzerland) E Gagliardi (Italy) T Garbin	6	0

Quarterfinals
1	(Greece) E Daniilidou (Spain) A Medina Garrigues	2	0	r
(France) V Razzano (Italy) An Serra Zanetti	6	1
4	(United Kingdom) C Curran (Latvia) L Dekmeijere	4	6	6
(Japan) A Nakamura (Japan) S Obata	6	3	4
(Japan) R Fuda (Japan) S Okamoto	2	1
3	(Poland) M Domachowska (Italy) R Vinci	6	6
(Germany) J Schruff (Germany) J Wöhr
2	(Switzerland) E Gagliardi (Italy) T Garbin	w/o

Semifinals
(France) V Razzano (Italy) An Serra Zanetti	1	4
4	(United Kingdom) C Curran (Latvia) L Dekmeijere	6	6
3	(Poland) M Domachowska (Italy) R Vinci	7	0	6
2	(Switzerland) E Gagliardi (Italy) T Garbin	5	6	4

Final
4	(United Kingdom) C Curran (Latvia) L Dekmeijere	6^{5}	3
3	(Poland) M Domachowska (Italy) R Vinci	7	6

== Qualifying ==
=== Seeds ===
1. (Russia) Ekaterina Bychkova / (Russia) Tatiana Panova (qualifying competition)
2. (Ukraine) Viktoria Kutuzova / (India) Shikha Uberoi (first round)

=== Qualifiers ===
1. (Sweden) Sofia Arvidsson / (Austria) Sybille Bammer

=== Qualifying draw ===
Semifinals			Final
			1	(Russia) Ekaterina Bychkova (Russia) Tatiana Panova	6
				(Sweden) Sofia Arvidsson (Austria) Sybille Bammer	8
	(Sweden) Sofia Arvidsson (Austria) Sybille Bammer	8		(Sweden) Sofia Arvidsson (Austria) Sybille Bammer	8
2	(Ukraine) Viktoria Kutuzova (India) Shikha Uberoi	6
