= 2006 Internationaux de Strasbourg – Doubles =

Doubles
- 2006 Internationaux de Strasbourg

Final
- Champions: (South Africa) Liezel Huber (United States) Martina Navratilova
- Runners-up: (Germany) Martina Müller (Romania) Andreea Vanc
- Score: 6–2, 7–6^{(7–1)}

Events
Singles	Doubles
- Internationaux de Strasbourg

Liezel Huber and Martina Navratilova defeated Martina Müller and Andreea Vanc in the final, 6–2, 7–6 [7–1] to win the doubles tennis title at the 2024 Internationaux de Strasbourg, a professional women's tennis tournament held in Strasbourg, France. Rosa María Andrés / Andreea Vanc were the defending champions.

== Seeds ==
1. (South Africa) Liezel Huber / (United States) Martina Navratilova (champions)
2. (Czech Republic) Gabriela Navrátilová / (Czech Republic) Vladimíra Uhlířová (semifinals)
3. (Germany) Martina Müller / (Romania) Andreea Vanc (final)
4. (United States) Jill Craybas / (Italy) Roberta Vinci (first round)

== Draw ==
Key

- Q = Qualifier
- WC = Wild card
- LL = Lucky loser
- Alt = Alternate
- ITF = ITF entry
- PR = Protected ranking
- SR = Special ranking
- SE = Special exempt
- JE = Junior exempt
- JR = Junior Accelerator Programme entrant
- CO = College Accelerator Programme entrant
- NG = Next Gen Accelerator Program entrant
- w/o = Walkover
- r = Retired
- d = Defaulted

First round
1	(South Africa) L Huber (United States) M Navratilova	w/o
(Austria) S Bammer (Germany) J Schruff
(Poland) M Domachowska (Poland) A Rosolska	7	6
(Japan) A Nakamura (China) T Sun	5	3
4	(United States) J Craybas (Italy) R Vinci	4	3
(Slovakia) J Gajdošová (Australia) B Stewart	6	6
(France) P Parmentier (France) C Pin	2r
(Russia) E Bychkova (Poland) K Jans	5
(Finland) E Laine (Russia) E Vesnina	6	6
(Poland) J Dobrowolska (Poland) A Mydlowska	1	0
(Serbia and Montenegro) J Janković (Slovenia) T Križan	6	3	3
3	(Germany) M Müller (Romania) A Vanc	2	6	6
WC	(France) A-L Heitz (France) E Le Bescond	0	6	2
(Switzerland) T Bacsinszky (Germany) C Schneider	6	2	6
(United States) A Frazier (United States) V King	3	1
2	(Czech Republic) G Navrátilová (Czech Republic) V Uhlířová	6	6

Quarterfinals
1	(South Africa) L Huber (United States) M Navratilova	6	6
(Poland) M Domachowska (Poland) A Rosolska	2	2
(Slovakia) J Gajdošová (Australia) B Stewart	6^{1}	6	6
(Russia) E Bychkova (Poland) K Jans	7^{7}	3	4
(Finland) E Laine (Russia) E Vesnina	2	0
3	(Germany) M Müller (Romania) A Vanc	6	6
(Switzerland) T Bacsinszky (Germany) C Schneider
2	(Czech Republic) G Navrátilová (Czech Republic) V Uhlířová	w/o

Semifinals
1	(South Africa) L Huber (United States) M Navratilova	3	6	6
(Slovakia) J Gajdošová (Australia) B Stewart	6	4	4
3	(Germany) M Müller (Romania) A Vanc	6	6
2	(Czech Republic) G Navrátilová (Czech Republic) V Uhlířová	3	3

Final
1	(South Africa) L Huber (United States) M Navratilova	6	7^{7}
3	(Germany) M Müller (Romania) A Vanc	2	6^{1}
