= 2006 Richard Luton Properties Canberra International – Singles =

Women's tennis tournament in Canberra, Australia

Singles
- 2006 Richard Luton Properties Canberra International

Final
- Champion: (Spain) Anabel Medina Garrigues
- Runner-up: (South Korea) Cho Yoon-jeong
- Score: 6–4, 0–6, 6–4

Details
- Draw: 32
- Seeds: 8

Events
| Singles | Doubles |
- Canberra International

Ana Ivanovic was the defending champion, but decided to compete at the 2006 Medibank International instead, which was held in the same week.

Spanish player Anabel Medina Garrigues won the title, defeating South Korea's Cho Yoon-jeong in the final in three sets, in the last edition of the tournament.

== Seeds ==
1. (Spain) Anabel Medina Garrigues (champion)
2. (France) Marion Bartoli (withdrew because of a left hip flexor strain)
3. (Czech Republic) Lucie Šafářová (withdrew because of a right adductor strain)
4. (Israel) Shahar Pe'er (semifinals)
5. (Italy) Roberta Vinci (second round)
6. (Colombia) Catalina Castaño (semifinals)
7. (Poland) Marta Domachowska (first round)
8. (Sweden) Sofia Arvidsson (first round)
9. (France) Virginie Razzano (second round)

== Draw ==
Key

- Q = Qualifier
- WC = Wild card
- LL = Lucky loser
- Alt = Alternate
- ITF = ITF entry
- PR = Protected ranking
- SR = Special ranking
- SE = Special exempt
- JE = Junior exempt
- JR = Junior Accelerator Programme entrant
- CO = College Accelerator Programme entrant
- NG = Next Gen Accelerator Program entrant
- w/o = Walkover
- r = Retired
- d = Defaulted

=== Finals ===
Semifinals
1 | (Spain) Anabel Medina Garrigues | 6^{4} | 7 | 6
4 | (Israel) Shahar Pe'er | 7 | 5 | 4
6 | (Colombia) Catalina Castaño | 3 | 6 | 3
(South Korea) Cho Yoon-jeong | 6 | 2 | 6

Final
1 | (Spain) Anabel Medina Garrigues | 6 | 0 | 6
(South Korea) Cho Yoon-jeong | 4 | 6 | 4

=== Top half ===
First round
1 | (Spain) A Medina Garrigues | 4 | 7 | 6
LL | (Switzerland) E Gagliardi | 6 | 6^{4} | 1
Q | (Belarus) T Poutchek | 6 | 6
WC | (Australia) S Ferguson | 0 | 2
(Czech Republic) Z Ondrášková | 1 | 4
(Russia) E Bychkova | 6 | 6
Q | (Russia) A Rodionova | 6 | 6
7 | (Poland) M Domachowska | 4 | 0
4 | (Israel) S Pe'er | 7 | 6
(Croatia) K Šprem | 5 | 3
(Greece) E Daniilidou | 6 | 6
(United States) M Shaughnessy | 3 | 3
Q | (Czech Republic) E Hrdinová | 2 | 2
(Japan) A Nakamura | 6 | 6
(Venezuela) M Vento-Kabchi | 4 | 4
5 | (Italy) R Vinci | 6 | 6

Second round
1 | (Spain) A Medina Garrigues | 6 | 6
Q | (Belarus) T Poutchek | 0 | 1
(Russia) E Bychkova | w/o
Q | (Russia) A Rodionova
4 | (Israel) S Pe'er | 7 | 6
(Greece) E Daniilidou | 6^{0} | 2
(Japan) A Nakamura | 7 | 6
5 | (Italy) R Vinci | 5 | 0

Quarterfinals
1 | (Spain) A Medina Garrigues | 6 | 6
(Russia) E Bychkova | 3 | 4
4 | (Israel) S Pe'er | 2 | 6 | 6
(Japan) A Nakamura | 6 | 3 | 0

Semifinals
1 | (Spain) A Medina Garrigues | 6^{4} | 7 | 6
4 | (Israel) S Pe'er | 7 | 5 | 4

=== Bottom half ===
First round
6 | (Colombia) C Castaño | 6 | 7
(Austria) S Bammer | 0 | 5
(Romania) A Perianu | 1 | 6^{5}
(Italy) T Garbin | 6 | 7
(Russia) T Panova | 5 | 3
(Germany) J Schruff | 7 | 6
WC | (Australia) S McDowell | 3 | 1
LL | (Austria) Y Meusburger | 6 | 6
8 | (Sweden) S Arvidsson | 4 | 4
(South Korea) Y-j Cho | 6 | 6
(Bulgaria) T Pironkova | 0 | 4
Q | (Finland) E Laine | 6 | 6
(Hungary) M Czink | 6 | 6
(Italy) An Serra Zanetti | 2 | 2
(Ukraine) V Kutuzova | 7 | 4 | 1
9 | (France) V Razzano | 6^{5} | 6 | 6

Second round
6 | (Colombia) C Castaño | 7 | 7
(Italy) T Garbin | 6^{4} | 5
(Germany) J Schruff | 6^{0} | 6 | 6
LL | (Austria) Y Meusburger | 7 | 4 | 1
(South Korea) Y-j Cho | 6 | 6
Q | (Finland) E Laine | 4 | 4
(Hungary) M Czink | 5 | 7 | 6
9 | (France) V Razzano | 7 | 5 | 3

Quarterfinals
6 | (Colombia) C Castaño | 5
(Germany) J Schruff | 2 | r
(South Korea) Y-j Cho | 4 | 6 | 6
(Hungary) M Czink | 6 | 3 | 3

Semifinals
6 | (Colombia) C Castaño | 3 | 6 | 3
(South Korea) Y-j Cho | 6 | 2 | 6

== Qualifying ==
=== Seeds ===
1. (Switzerland) Emmanuelle Gagliardi (Qualifying competition, lucky loser)
2. (Finland) Emma Laine (qualified)
3. (Japan) Saori Obata (first round)
4. (Uzbekistan) Varvara Lepchenko (first round)
5. (Austria) Yvonne Meusburger (Qualifying competition, lucky loser)
6. (Russia) Anastasia Rodionova (qualified)
7. (Italy) Nathalie Viérin (second round)
8. (Brazil) Maria Fernanda Alves (first round)

=== Qualifiers ===
1. (Russia) Anastasia Rodionova
2. (Finland) Emma Laine
3. (Belarus) Tatiana Poutchek
4. (Czech Republic) Eva Hrdinová

=== Lucky losers ===
1. (Switzerland) Emmanuelle Gagliardi
2. (Austria) Yvonne Meusburger

=== Qualifying draw ===
==== First qualifier ====
First round
(Japan) Seiko Okamoto | 3 | 7 | 6
(Ukraine) Olena Schmelzer | 6 | 6^{3} | 3
(Latvia) Līga Dekmeijere | 3 | 3
(France) Aravane Rezaï | 6 | 6
(United States) Vania King | 3 | 6^{3}
6 | (Russia) Anastasia Rodionova | 6 | 7

Second round
1 | (Switzerland) Emmanuelle Gagliardi | 7 | 6
(Japan) Seiko Okamoto | 6^{3} | 2
(France) Aravane Rezaï | 4 | 3
6 | (Russia) Anastasia Rodionova | 6 | 6

Qualifying competition
1 | (Switzerland) Emmanuelle Gagliardi | 5 | 6 | 3
6 | (Russia) Anastasia Rodionova | 7 | 3 | 6

==== Second qualifier ====
First round
(India) Shikha Uberoi | 7 | 6
(Croatia) Ivana Abramović | 6^{5} | 1
(Portugal) Frederica Piedade | 6^{6} | 7 | 2
(Japan) Ryōko Fuda | 7 | 6^{6} | 6
(Japan) Miho Saeki | 6 | 7
8 | (Brazil) Maria Fernanda Alves | 3 | 6^{5}

Second round
2 | (Finland) Emma Laine | 7 | 6
(India) Shikha Uberoi | 6^{4} | 4
(Japan) Ryōko Fuda | 6 | 6
(Japan) Miho Saeki | 2 | 2

Qualifying competition
2 | (Finland) Emma Laine | 4 | 6 | 7
(Japan) Ryōko Fuda | 6 | 1 | 5

==== Third qualifier ====
First round
3 | (Japan) Saori Obata | 4 | 4
(Belarus) Tatiana Poutchek | 6 | 6
WC | (Australia) Evie Dominikovic | 2 | 3
WC | (Australia) Monique Adamczak | 6 | 6
(Ukraine) Yuliya Beygelzimer
WC | (Australia) Sarah Benad | w/o
(Tunisia) Selima Sfar | 2 | 5
5 | (Austria) Yvonne Meusburger | 6 | 7

Second round
(Belarus) Tatiana Poutchek | 6 | 6
WC | (Australia) Monique Adamczak | 3 | 3
WC | (Australia) Sarah Benad | 0 | 0
5 | (Austria) Yvonne Meusburger | 6 | 6

Qualifying competition
(Belarus) Tatiana Poutchek | 6 | 6
5 | (Austria) Yvonne Meusburger | 2 | 1

==== Fourth qualifier ====
First round
4 | (Uzbekistan) Varvara Lepchenko | 3 | 2
(Luxembourg) Claudine Schaul | 6 | 6
(Ukraine) Olga Savchuk | 2 | 4
WC | (Australia) Christina Horiatopoulos | 6 | 6
(Czech Republic) Eva Hrdinová | 6 | 6
WC | (Australia) Olivia Lukaszewicz | 4 | 0
(France) Mathilde Johansson | 3 | 2
7 | (Italy) Nathalie Viérin | 6 | 6

Second round
(Luxembourg) Claudine Schaul | 4 | 6 | 5
WC | (Australia) Christina Horiatopoulos | 6 | 1 | 7
(Czech Republic) Eva Hrdinová | 6 | 7
7 | (Italy) Nathalie Viérin | 2 | 5

Qualifying competition
WC | (Australia) Christina Horiatopoulos | 1 | 2
(Czech Republic) Eva Hrdinová | 6 | 6
