= 2006 Internationaux de Strasbourg – Singles =

Singles
- 2006 Internationaux de Strasbourg

Final
- Champion: (Czech Republic) Nicole Vaidišová
- Runner-up: (China) Peng Shuai
- Score: 7–6^{(9–7)}, 6–3

Details
- Seeds: 8

Events
Singles	Doubles
- Internationaux de Strasbourg

In the 2006 singles match, Anabel Medina Garrigues was the defending champion, but was defeated in the semifinals by Peng Shuai. Nicole Vaidišová won the title, defeating Peng in the final 7–6^{(9–7)}, 6–3.

== Seeds ==
1. (Switzerland) Patty Schnyder (second round)
2. (Czech Republic) Nicole Vaidišová (champion)
3. (France) Nathalie Dechy (second round)
4. (Spain) Anabel Medina Garrigues (semifinals)
5. (France) Marion Bartoli (second round)
6. (Argentina) Gisela Dulko (first round)
7. (China) Zheng Jie (quarterfinals)
8. (Serbia and Montenegro) Jelena Janković (semifinals)

== Draw ==
Key

- Q = Qualifier
- WC = Wild card
- LL = Lucky loser
- Alt = Alternate
- ITF = ITF entry
- PR = Protected ranking
- SR = Special ranking
- SE = Special exempt
- JE = Junior exempt
- JR = Junior Accelerator Programme entrant
- CO = College Accelerator Programme entrant
- NG = Next Gen Accelerator Program entrant
- w/o = Walkover
- r = Retired
- d = Defaulted

=== Finals ===
Semifinals
(China) Peng Shuai	3	6	6
4	(Spain) Anabel Medina Garrigues	6	3	1
8	(Serbia and Montenegro) Jelena Janković	2	0^{r}
2	(Czech Republic) Nicole Vaidišová	6	1

Final
(China) Peng Shuai	6^{7}	3
2	(Czech Republic) Nicole Vaidišová	7^{9}	6

=== Top half ===
First round
(Germany) M Müller	6	6
(Italy) R Vinci	3	1
(Finland) E Laine	2	4
(Germany) J Schruff	6	6
(China) S Peng	6	6
6	(Argentina) G Dulko	2	3
4	(Spain) A Medina Garrigues	6	6
(United States) A Frazier	1	1
(Japan) A Nakamura	6	7
(Japan) S Asagoe	1	5
Q	(Italy) K Knapp	6	3	6^{3}
(Russia) E Vesnina	1	6	7^{7}
Q	(Slovakia) J Gajdošová	0	6^{1}
5	(France) M Bartoli	6	7^{7}

Second round
1	(Switzerland) P Schnyder	4	3
(Germany) M Müller	6	6
(Germany) J Schruff	5	3
(China) S Peng	7	6
4	(Spain) A Medina Garrigues	6	6
(Japan) A Nakamura	1	0
(Russia) E Vesnina	6	6
5	(France) M Bartoli	1	1

Quarterfinals
(Germany) M Müller	5	4
(China) S Peng	7	6
4	(Spain) A Medina Garrigues	6	6
(Russia) E Vesnina	2	4

Semifinals
(China) S Peng	3	6	6
4	(Spain) A Medina Garrigues	6	3	1

=== Bottom half ===
First round
8	(Serbia and Montenegro) J Janković	6
(Austria) S Bammer	5^{r}
Q	(United Kingdom) A Keothavong	3	1
(Israel) A Smashnova	6	6
(China) N Li	6	6
(Russia) E Bychkova	2	2
(China) Z Yan	2	1
3	(France) N Dechy	6	6
7	(China) J Zheng	4	6	6
Q	(China) M Yuan	6	4	2
(Poland) M Domachowska	7^{7}	6
(United States) J Craybas	6^{0}	2
SE	(Switzerland) T Bacsinszky	5	6	6
(United States) L Raymond	7	2	1

Second round
8	(Serbia and Montenegro) J Janković	6	5	6
(Israel) A Smashnova	1	7	2
(China) N Li	6	7^{7}
3	(France) N Dechy	3	6^{4}
7	(China) J Zheng	6	6
(Poland) M Domachowska	4	4
SE	(Switzerland) T Bacsinszky	3	2
2	(Czech Republic) N Vaidišová	6	6

Quarterfinals
8	(Serbia and Montenegro) J Janković	7	6
(China) N Li	5	1
7	(China) J Zheng	4	6	2
2	(Czech Republic) N Vaidišová	6	4	6

Semifinals
8	(Serbia and Montenegro) J Janković	2	0^{r}
2	(Czech Republic) N Vaidišová	6	1
