= 2006 Fed Cup World Group =

Part of tennis tournament

- Date: 22 April – 17 September
- Edition: 16th

Champions
- Italy
- Fed Cup

The World Group was the highest level of Fed Cup competition in 2006. Eight nations competed in a three-round knockout competition. Russia was the defending champion, but they were upset in the first round by Belgium. The Belgians made the final, but they were defeated in the final by Italy.

== Participating teams ==
Participating teams
| Austria | Belgium | France | Germany |
| Italy | Russia | Spain | United States |

== Draw ==
Quarterfinals; 22–23 April
Liège, Belgium (Indoor hard)
1 | Russia | 2
Belgium | 3
Ettenheim, Germany (Outdoor clay)
Germany | 2
4 | United States | 3
Valencia, Spain (Outdoor clay)
3 | Spain | 5
Austria | 0
Nancy, France (Indoor clay)
Italy | 4
2 | France | 1

Semifinals; 15–16 July
Ostend, Belgium (Indoor hard)
Belgium | 4
4 | United States | 1
Zaragoza, Spain (Outdoor clay)
3 | Spain | 1
Italy | 3

Final; 16–17 September
Charleroi, Belgium (Indoor hard)
Belgium | 2
Italy | 3

== First round ==
=== Russia vs. Belgium ===
Russia
2
Country Hall Ethias Liège, Liège, Belgium
22–23 April 2006
Red clay (indoors)

Belgium
3

| | | | 1 | 2 | 3 |
|---|---|---|---|---|---|
| 1 | (Russia) (Belgium) | Elena Dementieva; Kim Clijsters | 6; 4 | 6; 3 |
| 2 | (Russia) (Belgium) | Nadia Petrova; Justine Henin-Hardenne | 7^{7} 6^{2} | 4; 6 | 3; 6 |
| 3 | (Russia) (Belgium) | Maria Kirilenko; Kim Clijsters | 1; 6 | 4; 6 |
| 4 | (Russia) (Belgium) | Elena Dementieva; Justine Henin-Hardenne | 2; 6 | 0; 6 |
| 5 | (Russia) (Belgium) | Maria Kirilenko / Dinara Safina; Kim Clijsters / Justine Henin-Hardenne | 7^{7} 6^{4} | 7; 5 |

=== Germany vs. United States ===
Germany
2
Tennis Center Ettenheim, Ettenheim, Germany
22–23 April 2006
Red clay (outdoors)

United States
3

| | | | 1 | 2 | 3 |
|---|---|---|---|---|---|
| 1 | (Germany) (United States) | Anna-Lena Grönefeld; Jamea Jackson | 2; 6 | 6; 3 | 5; 7 |
| 2 | (Germany) (United States) | Julia Schruff; Jill Craybas | 6; 4 | 2; 6 | 5; 7 |
| 3 | (Germany) (United States) | Anna-Lena Grönefeld; Jill Craybas | 6; 2 | 7; 5 |
| 4 | (Germany) (United States) | Martina Müller; Jamea Jackson | 6^{2} 7^{7} | 2; 6 |
| 5 | (Germany) (United States) | Anna-Lena Grönefeld / Jasmin Wöhr; Vania King / Shenay Perry | 2; 6 | 6; 4 | 6; 2 |

=== Spain vs. Austria ===
Spain
5
Club Español de Tenis, Valencia, Spain
22–23 April 2006
Red clay (outdoors)

Austria
0

| | | | 1 | 2 | 3 |
|---|---|---|---|---|---|
| 1 | (Spain) (Austria) | Lourdes Domínguez Lino; Sybille Bammer | 7^{7} 6^{5} | 3; 6 | 6; 3 |
| 2 | (Spain) (Austria) | Anabel Medina Garrigues; Yvonne Meusburger | 6; 3 | 7; 5 |
| 3 | (Spain) (Austria) | Anabel Medina Garrigues; Sybille Bammer | 6; 0 | 6; 3 |
| 4 | (Spain) (Austria) | María Sánchez Lorenzo; Tamira Paszek | 6; 4 | 6^{5} 7^{7} | 7; 5 |
| 5 | (Spain) (Austria) | Virginia Ruano Pascual / Lourdes Domínguez Lino; Sybille Bammer / Yvonne Meusburger | 6; 4 | 6; 2 |

=== Italy vs. France ===
Italy
4
Palais des Sports Jean Weille, Nancy, France
22–23 April 2006
Red clay (outdoors)

France
1

| | | | 1 | 2 | 3 |
|---|---|---|---|---|---|
| 1 | (Italy) (France) | Francesca Schiavone; Nathalie Dechy | 6^{5} 7^{7} | 6; 3 | 6; 3 |
| 2 | (Italy) (France) | Flavia Pennetta; Amélie Mauresmo | 1; 6 | 1; 6 |
| 3 | (Italy) (France) | Francesca Schiavone; Amélie Mauresmo | 4; 6 | 7^{7} 6^{4} | 6; 4 |
| 4 | (Italy) (France) | Flavia Pennetta; Nathalie Dechy | 6; 4 | 6; 2 |
| 5 | (Italy) (France) | Mara Santangelo / Roberta Vinci; Émilie Loit / Virginie Razzano | 6; 1 | 6; 4 |

== Semifinals ==
=== Belgium vs. United States ===
Belgium
4
Sea'rena, Ostend, Belgium
15–16 July
Decoturf (indoors)

United States
1

| | | | 1 | 2 | 3 |
|---|---|---|---|---|---|---|
| 1 | (Belgium) (United States) | Kirsten Flipkens; Jill Craybas | 5; 7 | 6; 2 | 6; 4 |
| 2 | (Belgium) (United States) | Kim Clijsters; Jamea Jackson | 4; 6 | 6; 2 | 6; 1 |
| 3 | (Belgium) (United States) | Kim Clijsters; Vania King | 6; 0 | 6; 1 |
| 4 | (Belgium) (United States) | Kirsten Flipkens; Mashona Washington | 2; 6 | 3; 1 | | retired |
| 5 | (Belgium) (United States) | Leslie Butkiewicz / Caroline Maes; Jill Craybas / Vania King | 1; 6 | 2; 6 |

=== Spain vs. Italy ===
Spain
1
Stadium Casablanca, Zaragoza, Spain
15–16 July
Decoturf (indoors)

Italy
3

| | | | 1 | 2 | 3 |
|---|---|---|---|---|---|---|
| 1 | (Spain) (Italy) | Anabel Medina Garrigues; Flavia Pennetta | 3; 6 | 0; 6 |
| 2 | (Spain) (Italy) | Lourdes Domínguez Lino; Francesca Schiavone | 4; 6 | 5; 7 |
| 3 | (Spain) (Italy) | Anabel Medina Garrigues; Francesca Schiavone | 6; 2 | 6; 2 |
| 4 | (Spain) (Italy) | Lourdes Domínguez Lino; Flavia Pennetta | 2; 6 | 4; 6 |
| 5 | (Spain) (Italy) | Virginia Ruano Pascual / María Sánchez Lorenzo; Romina Oprandi / Mara Santangelo | | | | not played |

== Final ==
=== Belgium vs. Italy ===
Belgium
2
Spiroudome, Charleroi, Belgium
16–17 September
Decoturf (indoors)

Italy
3

| | | | 1 | 2 | 3 |
|---|---|---|---|---|---|---|
| 1 | (Belgium) (Italy) | Kirsten Flipkens; Francesca Schiavone | 1; 6 | 3; 6 |
| 2 | (Belgium) (Italy) | Justine Henin-Hardenne; Flavia Pennetta | 6; 4 | 7; 5 |
| 3 | (Belgium) (Italy) | Justine Henin-Hardenne; Francesca Schiavone | 6; 4 | 7; 5 |
| 4 | (Belgium) (Italy) | Kirsten Flipkens; Mara Santangelo | 7^{7} 6^{3} | 3; 6 | 0; 6 |
| 5 | (Belgium) (Italy) | Kirsten Flipkens / Justine Henin-Hardenne; Francesca Schiavone / Roberta Vinci | 6; 3 | 2; 6 | 0; 2 | retired |

2006 Fed Cup champions

Italy
First title

== See also ==
- Fed Cup structure
