= 2006 Porsche Tennis Grand Prix – Doubles =

Doubles
- 2006 Porsche Tennis Grand Prix

Final
- Champions: (United States) Lisa Raymond (Australia) Samantha Stosur
- Runners-up: (Zimbabwe) Cara Black (Australia) Rennae Stubbs
- Score: 6–3, 6–4

Events
Singles	Doubles
← 2005 ·	Porsche Tennis Grand Prix	· 2007 →

Daniela Hantuchová and Anastasia Myskina were the defending champions, but Myskina withdrew before the tournament began due to a left big toe inflammation. Hantuchová teamed up with Shahar Pe'er, but lost in the first round.

Lisa Raymond and Samantha Stosur won the title, winning in straight sets against their rivals Cara Black and Rennae Stubbs in the final.

== Seeds ==
1. (United States) Lisa Raymond / (Australia) Samantha Stosur (champions)
2. (Zimbabwe) Cara Black / (Australia) Rennae Stubbs (final)
3. (Russia) Dinara Safina / (Slovenia) Katarina Srebotnik (semifinals)
4. (Czech Republic) Květa Peschke / (Italy) Francesca Schiavone (quarterfinals, withdrew because of Schiavone's right wrist injury)

== Draw ==
=== Key ===
- Q = Qualifier
- WC = Wild card
- LL = Lucky loser
- Alt = Alternate
- SE = Special exempt
- PR = Protected ranking
- ITF = ITF entry
- JE = Junior exempt
- w/o = Walkover
- r = Retired
- d = Defaulted
- SR = Special ranking

First round
1	(United States) L Raymond (Australia) S Stosur	6	7
Q	(Slovenia) A Klepač (Poland) K Kosińska	0	5
(Serbia and Montenegro) J Janković (Netherlands) M Krajicek	6	7
(Czech Republic) I Benešová (Czech Republic) B Strýcová	2	5
4	(Czech Republic) K Peschke (Italy) F Schiavone	6	6
(Germany) A-L Grönefeld (South Africa) L Huber	2	3
(Germany) K Barrois (Germany) J Wöhr	2	6	5
(Czech Republic) L Hradecká (Czech Republic) G Navrátilová	6	3	7
(Russia) E Bychkova (Germany) M Müller	6	6
(Ukraine) Y Fedak (Romania) A Vanc	2	4
(Slovakia) D Hantuchová (Israel) S Pe'er	6	2	2
3	(Russia) D Safina (Slovenia) K Srebotnik	3	6	6
(Slovakia) J Husárová (Russia) E Likhovtseva	6	6
(Czech Republic) O Blahotová (Italy) M Santangelo	4	0
(Slovakia) J Gajdošová (Australia) B Stewart	4	3
2	(Zimbabwe) C Black (Australia) R Stubbs	6	6

Quarterfinals
1	(United States) L Raymond (Australia) S Stosur	7	6
(Serbia and Montenegro) J Janković (Netherlands) M Krajicek	6^{4}	4
4	(Czech Republic) K Peschke (Italy) F Schiavone
(Czech Republic) L Hradecká (Czech Republic) G Navrátilová	w/o
(Russia) E Bychkova (Germany) M Müller	1	2
3	(Russia) D Safina (Slovenia) K Srebotnik	6	6
(Slovakia) J Husárová (Russia) E Likhovtseva	3	7	6^{5}
2	(Zimbabwe) C Black (Australia) R Stubbs	6	6^{5}	7

Semifinals
1	(United States) L Raymond (Australia) S Stosur	w/o
(Czech Republic) L Hradecká (Czech Republic) G Navrátilová
3	(Russia) D Safina (Slovenia) K Srebotnik	4	4
2	(Zimbabwe) C Black (Australia) R Stubbs	6	6

Final
1	(United States) L Raymond (Australia) S Stosur	6	6
2	(Zimbabwe) C Black (Australia) R Stubbs	3	4
