= 2006 Porsche Tennis Grand Prix – Singles =

Singles
- 2006 Porsche Tennis Grand Prix

Final
- Champion: (Russia) Nadia Petrova
- Runner-up: (France) Tatiana Golovin
- Score: 6–3, 7–6^{(7–4)}

Details
- Draw: 28
- Seeds: 8

Events
| Singles | Doubles |
- Porsche Tennis Grand Prix

Lindsay Davenport was the two-time defending champion, but chose not to participate that year.

Nadia Petrova won the title, defeating Tatiana Golovin in straight sets in the finals match.

== Seeds ==
1. (France) Amélie Mauresmo (withdrew because of a right shoulder injury)
2. (Russia) Svetlana Kuznetsova (semifinals)
3. (Russia) Elena Dementieva (quarterfinals, withdrew because of a left thigh injury)
4. (Russia) Nadia Petrova (champion)
5. (Switzerland) Patty Schnyder (semifinals)
6. (Russia) Dinara Safina (second round)
7. (Italy) Francesca Schiavone (first round, retired because of a right wrist injury)
8. (Serbia and Montenegro) Jelena Janković (quarterfinals)

== Draw ==
Key

- Q = Qualifier
- WC = Wild card
- LL = Lucky loser
- Alt = Alternate
- ITF = ITF entry
- PR = Protected ranking
- SR = Special ranking
- SE = Special exempt
- JE = Junior exempt
- JR = Junior Accelerator Programme entrant
- CO = College Accelerator Programme entrant
- NG = Next Gen Accelerator Program entrant
- w/o = Walkover
- r = Retired
- d = Defaulted

=== Finals ===
Semifinals
(France) Tatiana Golovin | 6 | 5 | 7
5 | (Switzerland) Patty Schnyder | 1 | 7 | 5
4 | (Russia) Nadia Petrova | 6 | 1 | 6
2 | (Russia) Svetlana Kuznetsova | 2 | 6 | 4

Final
(France) Tatiana Golovin | 3 | 6^{4}
4 | (Russia) Nadia Petrova | 6 | 7

=== Top half ===
First round
(Netherlands) M Krajicek | 6 | 6^{2} | 6
(Australia) S Stosur | 2 | 7 | 1
(Russia) E Likhovtseva | 6 | 0 | 3
(France) T Golovin | 4 | 6 | 6
LL | (Czech Republic) I Benešová | 6 | 6^{5} | 3
7 | (Italy) F Schiavone | 3 | 7 | 0^{r}
(Slovenia) K Srebotnik | 6 | 6
(France) N Dechy | 1 | 4
Q | (Russia) E Bychkova | 3 | 3
(Israel) S Pe'er | 6 | 6
(United States) C Rubin | 2 | 2
5 | (Switzerland) P Schnyder | 6 | 6

Second round
LL | (United States) L Raymond | 4 | 2
(Netherlands) M Krajicek | 6 | 6
(France) T Golovin | 6 | 6
LL | (Czech Republic) I Benešová | 4 | 3
3 | (Russia) E Dementieva | 4 | 7 | 7
(Slovenia) K Srebotnik | 6 | 5 | 5
(Israel) S Pe'er | 6^{3} | 6 | 4
5 | (Switzerland) P Schnyder | 7 | 2 | 6

Quarterfinals
(Netherlands) M Krajicek | 1 | 2
(France) T Golovin | 6 | 6
3 | (Russia) E Dementieva
5 | (Switzerland) P Schnyder | w/o

Semifinals
(France) T Golovin | 6 | 5 | 7
5 | (Switzerland) P Schnyder | 1 | 7 | 5

=== Bottom half ===
First round
6 | (Russia) D Safina | 6 | 5 | 7
(Italy) M Santangelo | 1 | 7 | 6^{9}
(Slovakia) D Hantuchová | 6 | 5 | 7
Q | (Austria) S Bammer | 3 | 7 | 3
(Germany) A-L Grönefeld | 6 | 2 | 6
WC | (Germany) T Malek | 3 | 6 | 0
8 | (Serbia and Montenegro) J Janković | 7 | 6
(France) M Pierce | 6^{7} | 3
Q | (Bulgaria) T Pironkova | 6 | 6
Q | (Croatia) K Šprem | 1 | 4
WC | (Germany) M Müller | 6 | 7
WC | (Czech Republic) K Peschke | 0 | 6^{4}

Second round
6 | (Russia) D Safina | 2 | 2
(Slovakia) D Hantuchová | 6 | 6
(Germany) A-L Grönefeld | 3 | 4
4 | (Russia) N Petrova | 6 | 6
8 | (Serbia and Montenegro) J Janković | 4 | 6 | 7
Q | (Bulgaria) T Pironkova | 6 | 2 | 5
WC | (Germany) M Müller | 1 | 4
2 | (Russia) S Kuznetsova | 6 | 6

Quarterfinals
(Slovakia) D Hantuchová | 2 | 4
4 | (Russia) N Petrova | 6 | 6
8 | (Serbia and Montenegro) J Janković | 4 | 1
2 | (Russia) S Kuznetsova | 6 | 6

Semifinals
4 | (Russia) N Petrova | 6 | 1 | 6
2 | (Russia) S Kuznetsova | 2 | 6 | 4
