= 2006 Gaz de France Stars – Singles =

Singles
- 2006 Gaz de France Stars

Final
- Champion: (Belgium) Kim Clijsters
- Runner-up: (Estonia) Kaia Kanepi
- Score: 6–3, 3–6, 6–4

Details
- Draw: 32
- Seeds: 8

Events
Singles	Doubles
← 2005 ·	Gaz de France Stars

The singles event at the 2006 Gaz de France Stars took place between October 30 and November 5 on indoor hard courts in Hasselt, Belgium.

Kim Clijsters was the home crowd favourite; and emerged as the winner.

== Seeds ==
1. (Belgium) Kim Clijsters (champion)
2. (Italy) Francesca Schiavone (quarterfinals)
3. (Serbia and Montenegro) Ana Ivanovic (quarterfinals)
4. (Germany) Anna-Lena Grönefeld (first round)
5. (Japan) Ai Sugiyama (first round)
6. (Russia) Vera Zvonareva (semifinals)
7. (Australia) Samantha Stosur (second round)
8. (Italy) Mara Santangelo (first round, retired due to a left wrist tendon injury)

== Draw ==
=== Key ===
- Q = Qualifier
- WC = Wild card
- LL = Lucky loser
- Alt = Alternate
- ITF = ITF entry
- PR = Protected ranking
- SR = Special ranking
- SE = Special exempt
- JE = Junior exempt
- JR = Junior Accelerator Programme entrant
- CO = College Accelerator Programme entrant
- NG = Next Gen Accelerator Program entrant
- w/o = Walkover
- r = Retired
- d = Defaulted

=== Finals ===
Semifinals
1	(Belgium) Kim Clijsters	6	3	6
6	(Russia) Vera Zvonareva	4	6	4
(Netherlands) Michaëlla Krajicek	4	4
Q	(Estonia) Kaia Kanepi	6	6

Final
1	(Belgium) Kim Clijsters	6	3	6
Q	(Estonia) Kaia Kanepi	3	6	4

=== Top half ===
First round
1	(Belgium) K Clijsters	6	6
LL	(Luxembourg) A Kremer	3	2
(Germany) M Müller	2	6	6
LL	(Ukraine) K Bondarenko	6	4	4
Q	(Italy) R Vinci	1	7	4
(Germany) S Klösel	6	6^{4}	6
LL	(Ukraine) O Savchuk	4	1
7	(Australia) S Stosur	6	6
4	(Germany) A-L Grönefeld	1	3
Q	(France) A Rezaï	6	6
(Czech Republic) L Šafářová	4	2
(Croatia) K Šprem	6	6
WC	(Belgium) K Flipkens	4
(Russia) E Vesnina	0	r
WC	(Russia) V Dushevina	6^{3}	1
6	(Russia) V Zvonareva	7	6

Second round
1	(Belgium) K Clijsters	6	6
(Germany) M Müller	3	2
(Germany) S Klösel	7	2	6
7	(Australia) S Stosur	6^{2}	6	3
Q	(France) A Rezaï	5	7	6
(Croatia) K Šprem	7	6^{7}	1
WC	(Belgium) K Flipkens	3	4
6	(Russia) V Zvonareva	6	6

Quarterfinals
1	(Belgium) K Clijsters	6	6
(Germany) S Klösel	1	0
Q	(France) A Rezaï	6^{5}	2
6	(Russia) V Zvonareva	7	6

Semifinals
1	(Belgium) K Clijsters	6	3	6
6	(Russia) V Zvonareva	4	6	4

=== Bottom half ===
First round
8	(Italy) M Santangelo	2	r
(Netherlands) M Krajicek	5
LL	(Ukraine) Y Fedak	6	2	5
WC	(Belgium) C Maes	3	6	7
Q	(Germany) A Kerber	6	4	4
(Italy) R Oprandi	1	6	1^{r}
LL	(Germany) A Petkovic	3	5
3	(Serbia and Montenegro) A Ivanovic	6	7
5	(Japan) A Sugiyama	6	3	4
(Greece) E Daniilidou	0	6	6
Q	(Estonia) K Kanepi	6	6
(France) N Dechy	4	4
(Russia) E Bovina	4	2
LL	(Poland) A Radwańska	6	6
(United States) M Shaughnessy	2	1
2	(Italy) F Schiavone	6	6

Second round
(Netherlands) M Krajicek	7	2	6
WC	(Belgium) C Maes	6^{3}	6	3
Q	(Germany) A Kerber	3	7	3
3	(Serbia and Montenegro) A Ivanovic	6	6^{3}	6
(Greece) E Daniilidou	3	4
Q	(Estonia) K Kanepi	6	6
LL	(Poland) A Radwańska	3	4
2	(Italy) F Schiavone	6	6

Quarterfinals
(Netherlands) M Krajicek	6	6
3	(Serbia and Montenegro) A Ivanovic	3	4
Q	(Estonia) K Kanepi	6	7
2	(Italy) F Schiavone	2	5

Semifinals
(Netherlands) M Krajicek	4	4
Q	(Estonia) K Kanepi	6	6
