= 2006 Gaz de France Stars – Doubles =

Doubles
- 2006 Gaz de France Stars

Final
- Champion: (United States) Lisa Raymond (Australia) Samantha Stosur
- Runner-up: (Greece) Eleni Daniilidou (Germany) Jasmin Wöhr
- Score: 6–2, 6–3

Details
- Draw: 16
- Seeds: 4

Events
Singles	Doubles
← 2005 ·	Gaz de France Stars

The doubles Tournament at the 2006 Gaz de France Stars took place between October 30 and November 5 on indoor hard courts in Hasselt, Belgium.

Émilie Loit and Katarina Srebotnik were the defending champions, but both chose not to compete in 2006.

Lisa Raymond and Samantha Stosur won the title.

== Seeds ==
1. (United States) Lisa Raymond / (Australia) Samantha Stosur (champions)
2. (Russia) Vera Douchevina / (Italy) Mara Santangelo (first round)
3. (Czech Republic) Barbora Strýcová / (Romania) Andreea Vanc (semifinals)
4. (Ukraine) Kateryna Bondarenko / (Ukraine) Yuliana Fedak (semifinals)

== Draw ==
=== Key ===
- Q = Qualifier
- WC = Wild card
- LL = Lucky loser
- Alt = Alternate
- ITF = ITF entry
- PR = Protected ranking
- SR = Special ranking
- SE = Special exempt
- JE = Junior exempt
- JR = Junior Accelerator Programme entrant
- CO = College Accelerator Programme entrant
- NG = Next Gen Accelerator Program entrant
- w/o = Walkover
- r = Retired
- d = Defaulted

=== Results ===
First round
1	(United States) L Raymond (Australia) S Stosur	6	6
(Poland) A Radwańska (Lithuania) L Stančiūtė	0	3
(Belgium) K Flipkens (Netherlands) M Krajicek	2	6	3
(Germany) V Henke (Serbia and Montenegro) D Krstajić	6	3	6
3	(Czech Republic) B Strýcová (Romania) A Vanc	3	6	7
(Poland) K Jans (Poland) A Rosolska	6	3	5
WC	(Belgium) L Butkiewicz (Belgium) C Maes	6	0	3
(Latvia) L Dekmeijere (Germany) M Müller	2	6	6
Q	(Belgium) J de Vries (Belgium) S Van Deun	0	0
(Luxembourg) A Kremer (France) V Razzano	6	6
(Germany) S Klösel (Czech Republic) V Uhlířová	4	4
4	(Ukraine) K Bondarenko (Ukraine) Y Fedak	6	6
(Netherlands) K Kilsdonk (Netherlands) E Tamaëla	6	4	6
(France) S Lefèvre (France) A Védy	4	6	3
(Greece) E Daniilidou (Germany) J Wöhr	w/o
2	(Russia) V Douchevina (Italy) M Santangelo

Quarterfinals
1	(United States) L Raymond (Australia) S Stosur	6	6
(Germany) V Henke (Serbia and Montenegro) D Krstajić	2	2
3	(Czech Republic) B Strýcová (Romania) A Vanc	7	6
(Latvia) L Dekmeijere (Germany) M Müller	5	2
(Luxembourg) A Kremer (France) V Razzano	1	1
4	(Ukraine) K Bondarenko (Ukraine) Y Fedak	6	6
(Netherlands) K Kilsdonk (Netherlands) E Tamaëla	5	0
(Greece) E Daniilidou (Germany) J Wöhr	7	6

Semifinals
1	(United States) L Raymond (Australia) S Stosur	7	6
3	(Czech Republic) B Strýcová (Romania) A Vanc	5	1
4	(Ukraine) K Bondarenko (Ukraine) Y Fedak	2	2
(Greece) E Daniilidou (Germany) J Wöhr	6	6

Final
1	(United States) L Raymond (Australia) S Stosur	6	6
(Greece) E Daniilidou (Germany) J Wöhr	2	3
