= Nikolay Davydenko career statistics =

Career finals
Discipline	Type	Won	Lost	Total	WR
Singles	Grand Slam tournaments	–	–	–	–
Singles	Year-end championships	1	1	2	0.50
Singles	ATP Masters 1000*	3	0	3	1.00
Singles	Olympic Games	–	–	–	–
Singles	ATP Tour 500	1	0	1	1.00
Singles	ATP Tour 250	16	6	22	0.73
Singles	Total	21	7	28	0.75
Doubles	Grand Slam tournaments	–	–	–	–
Doubles	Year-end championships	–	–	–	–
Doubles	ATP Masters 1000*	–	–	–	–
Doubles	Olympic Games	–	–	–	–
Doubles	ATP Tour 500	–	–	–	–
Doubles	ATP Tour 250	2	2	4	0.50
Doubles	Total	2	2	4	0.50
Total		23	9	32	0.72
1) WR = Winning Rate; 2) * formerly known as "Super 9" (1996–1999), "Tennis Masters Series" (2000–2003) or "ATP Masters Series" (2004–2008).

This is a list of the main career statistics of tennis player Nikolay Davydenko.

== Significant finals ==
=== Year-end championship finals ===
==== Singles: 2 (1 title, 1 runner-up) ====
Result	Date	Championship	Surface	Opponent	Score
Loss	2008	Shanghai	Hard (i)	(Serbia) Novak Djokovic	1–6, 5–7
Win	2009	London	Hard (i)	(Argentina) Juan Martín del Potro	6–3, 6–4

=== Masters 1000 finals ===
==== Singles: 3 (3 titles) ====
Result	Date	Tournament	Surface	Opponent	Score
Win	2006	Paris	Carpet (i)	(Slovakia) Dominik Hrbatý	6–1, 6–2, 6–2
Win	2008	Miami	Hard	(Spain) Rafael Nadal	6–4, 6–2
Win	2009	Shanghai	Hard	(Spain) Rafael Nadal	7–6^{(7–3)}, 6–3

== ATP career finals ==
=== Singles: 28 (21 titles / 7 runner-ups) ===
Legend (pre/post 2009) Grand Slam tournaments (0–0) Tennis Masters Cup / ATP World Tour Finals (1–1) ATP Masters Series / ATP World Tour Masters 1000 (3–0) ATP International Series Gold / ATP World Tour 500 Series (1–0) ATP International Series / ATP World Tour 250 Series (16–6)	Titles by surface Hard (8–3) Clay (10–4) Grass (0–0) Carpet (3–0)	Titles by setting Outdoor (15–6) Indoor (6–1)

Result	W–L	Date	Tournament	Tier	Surface	Opponent	Score
Win	1–0	Jan 2003	Adelaide International, Australia	International	Hard	(Belgium) Kristof Vliegen	6–2, 7–6^{(7–3)}
Win	2–0	Apr 2003	Estoril Open, Portugal	International	Clay	(Argentina) Agustín Calleri	6–4, 6–3
Loss	2–1	May 2003	St. Pölten International, Austria	International	Clay	(United States) Andy Roddick	3–6, 2–6
Win	3–1	May 2004	Bavarian Championships, Germany	International	Clay	(Netherlands) Martin Verkerk	6–4, 7–5
Win	4–1	Oct 2004	Kremlin Cup, Russia	International	Carpet (i)	(United Kingdom) Greg Rusedski	3–6, 6–3, 7–5
Win	5–1	May 2005	St. Pölten International, Austria	International	Clay	(Austria) Jürgen Melzer	6–3, 2–6, 6–4
Loss	5–2	May 2006	Estoril Open, Portugal	International	Clay	(Argentina) David Nalbandian	3–6, 4–6
Win	6–2	May 2006	Pörtschach International, Austria (2)	International	Clay	(Romania) Andrei Pavel	6–3, 6–0
Loss	6–3	Jul 2006	Swedish Open, Sweden	International	Clay	(Spain) Tommy Robredo	2–6, 1–6
Win	7–3	Aug 2006	Sopot Open, Poland	International	Clay	(Germany) Florian Mayer	7–6^{(8–6)}, 5–7, 6–4
Win	8–3	Aug 2006	Connecticut Open, United States	International	Hard	(Argentina) Agustín Calleri	6–4, 6–3
Win	9–3	Oct 2006	Kremlin Cup, Russia (2)	International	Carpet (i)	(Russia) Marat Safin	6–4, 5–7, 6–4
Win	10–3	Nov 2006	Paris Masters, France	Masters	Carpet (i)	(Slovakia) Dominik Hrbatý	6–1, 6–2, 6–2
Win	11–3	Oct 2007	Kremlin Cup, Russia (3)	International	Hard (i)	(France) Paul-Henri Mathieu	7–5, 7–6^{(11–9)}
Win	12–3	Apr 2008	Miami Open, United States	Masters	Hard	(Spain) Rafael Nadal	6–4, 6–2
Loss	12–4	Apr 2008	Estoril Open, Portugal	International	Clay	(Switzerland) Roger Federer	6–7^{(5–7)}, 1–2 ret.
Win	13–4	May 2008	Pörtschach International, Austria (3)	International	Clay	(Argentina) Juan Mónaco	6–2, 2–6, 6–2
Win	14–4	Jun 2008	Warsaw Open, Poland	International	Clay	(Spain) Tommy Robredo	6–3, 6–3
Loss	14–5	Nov 2008	Tennis Masters Cup, China	Tour Finals	Hard (i)	(Serbia) Novak Djokovic	1–6, 5–7
Win	15–5	Jul 2009	German Open, Germany	500 Series	Clay	(France) Paul-Henri Mathieu	6–4, 6–2
Win	16–5	Aug 2009	Croatia Open, Croatia	250 Series	Clay	(Spain) Juan Carlos Ferrero	6–3, 6–0
Win	17–5	Oct 2009	Malaysian Open, Malaysia	250 Series	Hard (i)	(Spain) Fernando Verdasco	6–4, 7–5
Win	18–5	Oct 2009	Shanghai Masters, China	Masters 1000	Hard	(Spain) Rafael Nadal	7–6^{(7–3)}, 6–3
Win	19–5	Nov 2009	ATP World Tour Finals, United Kingdom	Tour Finals	Hard (i)	(Argentina) Juan Martín del Potro	6–3, 6–4
Win	20–5	Jan 2010	Qatar Open, Qatar	250 Series	Hard	(Spain) Rafael Nadal	0–6, 7–6^{(10–8)}, 6–4
Loss	20–6	Jan 2011	Qatar Open, Qatar	250 Series	Hard	(Switzerland) Roger Federer	3–6, 4–6
Win	21–6	May 2011	Bavarian Championships, Germany (2)	250 Series	Clay	(Germany) Florian Mayer	6–3, 3–6, 6–1
Loss	21–7	Jan 2013	Qatar Open, Qatar	250 Series	Hard	(France) Richard Gasquet	6–3, 6–7^{(4–7)}, 3–6

=== Doubles: 4 (2 titles / 2 runner-ups) ===
Legend (pre/post 2009) Grand Slam tournaments (0–0) Tennis Masters Cup / ATP World Tour Finals (0–0) ATP Masters Series / ATP World Tour Masters 1000 (0–0) ATP International Series Gold / ATP World Tour 500 Series (0–0) ATP International Series / ATP World Tour 250 Series (2–2)	Titles by surface Hard (1–0) Clay (0–1) Grass (0–0) Carpet (1–1)	Titles by setting Outdoor (0–1) Indoor (2–1)

Result	W–L	Date	Tournament	Tier	Surface	Partner	Opponents	Score
Win	1–0	Oct 2004	Kremlin Cup, Russia	International	Carpet (i)	(Russia) Igor Andreev	(India) Mahesh Bhupathi (Sweden) Jonas Björkman	3–6, 6–3, 6–4
Loss	1–1	Oct 2005	Kremlin Cup, Russia	International	Carpet (i)	(Russia) Igor Andreev	(Belarus) Max Mirnyi (Russia) Mikhail Youzhny	1–6, 1–6
Loss	1–2	Jun 2008	Warsaw Open, Poland	International	Clay	(Kazakhstan) Yuri Schukin	(Poland) Mariusz Fyrstenberg (Poland) Mariusz Fyrstenberg	0–6, 6–3, [4–10]
Win	2–2	Feb 2014	Open Sud de France, France	250 Series	Hard (i)	(Uzbekistan) Denis Istomin	(France) Marc Gicquel (France) Nicolas Mahut	6–4, 1–6, [10–7]

=== Team competition: 2 (1–1) ===
Result	No.	Date	Tournament	Surface	Partner	Opponents	Score
Win	1.	December 1–3, 2006	Davis Cup, Moscow, Russia	Carpet (i)	(Russia) Marat Safin (Russia) Mikhail Youzhny (Russia) Dmitry Tursunov	(Argentina) David Nalbandian (Argentina) José Acasuso (Argentina) Agustín Calleri (Argentina) Juan Ignacio Chela	3–2
Loss	1.	November 30 – December 2, 2007	Davis Cup, Portland, United States	Hard (i)	(Russia) Mikhail Youzhny (Russia) Igor Andreev (Russia) Dmitry Tursunov	(United States) Andy Roddick (United States) James Blake (United States) Bob Bryan (United States) Mike Bryan	1–4

== Singles performance timeline ==
Key
W	F	SF	QF	#R	RR	Q#	P#	DNQ	A	Z#	PO	G	S	B	NMS	NTI	P	NH

(W) winner; (F) finalist; (SF) semifinalist; (QF) quarterfinalist; (#R) rounds 4, 3, 2, 1; (RR) round-robin stage; (Q#) qualification round; (P#) preliminary round; (DNQ) did not qualify; (A) absent; (Z#) Davis/Fed Cup Zonal Group (with number indication) or (PO) play-off; (G) gold, (S) silver or (B) bronze Olympic/Paralympic medal; (NMS) not a Masters tournament; (NTI) not a Tier I tournament; (P) postponed; (NH) not held; (SR) strike rate (events won / competed); (W–L) win–loss record.

Tournament	2000	2001	2002	2003	2004	2005	2006	2007	2008	2009	2010	2011	2012	2013	2014	SR	W–L
Grand Slam Tournaments
Australian Open	A	2R	1R	1R	2R	QF	QF	QF	4R	A	QF	1R	1R	2R	2R	0 / 13	23–13
French Open	A	2R	2R	2R	1R	SF	QF	SF	3R	QF	A	2R	1R	3R	1R	0 / 13	26–13
Wimbledon	A	A	1R	1R	1R	2R	1R	4R	1R	3R	2R	1R	1R	A	A	0 / 11	7–11
US Open	A	1R	2R	2R	3R	2R	SF	SF	4R	4R	2R	3R	2R	2R	A	0 / 13	26–13
Win–loss	0–0	2–3	2–4	2–4	3–4	11–4	13–4	17–4	8–4	9–3	6–3	3–4	1–4	4–3	1–2	0 / 50	82–50
Year-end championship
ATP World Tour Finals	did not qualify					SF	RR	RR	F	W	did not qualify					1 / 5	12–8
Davis Cup
Singles	A	A	A	QF	PO	SF	W	F	SF	A	QF	A	A	A	A	1 / 7	14–9
Olympic Games
Summer Olympics	A	not held			1R	not held			2R	not held			2R	not held		0 / 3	2–3
ATP World Tour Masters 1000
Indian Wells Masters	A	A	LQ	A	1R	2R	3R	4R	3R	A	3R	2R	3R	2R	2R	0 / 10	10–8
Miami Masters	A	A	2R	1R	2R	2R	4R	3R	W	A	A	1R	2R	2R	1R	1 / 11	13–10
Monte Carlo Masters	A	LQ	LQ	1R	QF	3R	1R	2R	SF	QF	A	1R	A	2R	A	0 / 9	11–9
Rome Masters	A	LQ	1R	2R	3R	1R	3R	SF	3R	2R	A	1R	1R	1R	A	0 / 11	9–11
Madrid Masters	not held		A	1R	A	3R	2R	A	2R	3R	A	1R	2R	1R	A	0 / 8	4–7
Hamburg Masters	A	A	A	2R	1R	SF	QF	3R	3R	ATP Tour 500						0 / 6	10–6
Canada Masters	A	A	A	2R	A	3R	1R	QF	3R	QF	3R	2R	A	QF	A	0 / 9	13–9
Cincinnati Masters	A	A	A	1R	A	QF	1R	SF	2R	3R	QF	2R	3R	2R	A	0 / 10	13–10
Shanghai Masters	not held									W	2R	A	A	A	A	1 / 2	5–1
Eurocard Open	A	LQ	not held													0 / 0	0–0
Paris Masters	A	A	A	1R	2R	QF	W	3R	SF	3R	QF	1R	A	A	A	1 / 9	15–8
Win–loss	0–0	0–0	1–2	3–8	7–6	14–9	13–8	13–8	16–8	13–5	6–4	3–8	6–4	7–7	1–2	3 / 85	103–79
Career statistics
Tournaments played	1	15	24	33	31	30	32	30	23	23	20	26	25	23	10	346	
Titles–finals	0–0	0–0	0–0	2–3	2–2	1–1	5–7	1–1	3–5	5–5	1–1	1–2	0–0	0–1	0–0	21–28	
Overall W–L	3–1	6–15	12–24	30–33	33–29	56–30	69–29	53–31	56–21	57–17	30–19	25–25	24–23	22–22	6–10	21 / 336	482–329
Win %	75%	29%	33%	48%	53%	65%	70%	63%	73%	77%	61%	50%	51%	50%	38%	59.43%	
Year-end ranking	134	79	85	44	28	5	3	4	5	6	22	41	44	53	251	16,186,480	

== Doubles performance timeline ==
Key
W	F	SF	QF	#R	RR	Q#	DNQ	A	NH

(W) winner; (F) finalist; (SF) semifinalist; (QF) quarterfinalist; (#R) rounds 4, 3, 2, 1; (RR) round-robin stage; (Q#) qualification round; (DNQ) did not qualify; (A) absent; (NH) not held; (SR) strike rate (events won / competed); (W–L) win–loss record.

Tournament	2003	2004	2005	2006	...	2013	2014	SR	W–L
Grand Slam Tournaments
Australian Open	A	1R	2R	1R	A	A	1R	0 / 4	1–4
French Open	A	2R	3R	A	A	A	A	0 / 2	3–2
Wimbledon	1R	QF	A	A	A	A	A	0 / 2	3–2
US Open	1R	2R	2R	A	A	2R	A	0 / 3	3–4
Win–loss	0–2	5–4	4–3	0–1	0-0	1–1	0–1	0 / 11	10–12

== Head-to-head against other players ==
Davydenko's win-loss record against certain players who have been ranked World No. 10 or better is as follows:

Players who have been ranked World No. 1 are in boldface.

- (Czech Republic) Tomáš Berdych 9–3
- (Spain) Fernando Verdasco 7–2
- (Chile) Fernando González 6–0
- (Austria) Jürgen Melzer 6–1
- (Czech Republic) Radek Štěpánek 6–4
- (Spain) **Rafael Nadal** 6–5
- (Spain) Tommy Robredo 5–2
- (Croatia) Mario Ančić 5–2
- (Argentina) David Nalbandian 5–7
- (Canada) / (United Kingdom) Greg Rusedski 4–0
- (France) Arnaud Clément 4–0
- (Germany) Tommy Haas 4–1
- (Slovakia) Dominik Hrbatý 4–1
- (Spain) David Ferrer 4–2
- (Russia) Mikhail Youzhny 4–2
- (Russia) **Marat Safin** 4–4
- (Croatia) Ivan Ljubičić 4–4
- (United Kingdom) **Andy Murray** 4–6
- (Sweden) Robin Söderling 4–7
- (Germany) Rainer Schüttler 3–1
- (Spain) **Juan Carlos Ferrero** 3–2
- (Sweden) Thomas Johansson 3–2
- (Serbia and Montenegro) / (Serbia) Janko Tipsarević 3–2
- (United States) John Isner 3–3
- (Argentina) Juan Martín del Potro 3–4
- (France) Sébastien Grosjean 2–0
- (Chile) Nicolás Massú 2–0
- (Sweden) Jonas Björkman 2–1
- (Argentina) Mariano Puerta 2–1
- (Switzerland) Stanislas Wawrinka 2–1
- (France) Gaël Monfils 2–2
- (Cyprus) Marcos Baghdatis 2–2
- (United States) Mardy Fish 2–3
- (Croatia) Marin Čilić 2–3
- (Argentina) Guillermo Cañas 2–3
- (Thailand) Paradorn Srichaphan 2–3
- (Ecuador) Nicolás Lapentti 2–3
- (Spain) Albert Costa 2–3
- (France) Jo-Wilfried Tsonga 2–4
- (Spain) **Carlos Moyá** 2–5
- (France) Gilles Simon 2–5
- (Argentina) Gastón Gaudio 2–5
- (Serbia and Montenegro) / (Serbia) **Novak Djokovic** 2–6
- (France) Richard Gasquet 2–6
- (Switzerland) **Roger Federer** 2–19
- (Spain) Àlex Corretja 1–0
- (Belgium) David Goffin 1–0
- (Australia) Mark Philippoussis 1–0
- (Switzerland) Marc Rosset 1–0
- (Russia) **Yevgeny Kafelnikov** 1–1
- (Czech Republic) Jiří Novák 1–1
- (Slovakia) Karol Kučera 1–1
- (Spain) Félix Mantilla 1–1
- (United States) **Andre Agassi** 1–2
- (United Kingdom) Tim Henman 1–2
- (Argentina) Guillermo Coria 1–2
- (Spain) Nicolás Almagro 1–3
- (Germany) Nicolas Kiefer 1–3
- (United States) **Andy Roddick** 1–5
- (United States) James Blake 1–7
- (Bulgaria) Grigor Dimitrov 0–1
- (Netherlands) Richard Krajicek 0–1
- (Sweden) Joachim Johansson 0–1
- (United States) Todd Martin 0–1
- (Australia) **Patrick Rafter** 0–1
- (Canada) Milos Raonic 0–1
- (Brazil) **Gustavo Kuerten** 0–2
- (Japan) Kei Nishikori 0–2
- (Australia) **Lleyton Hewitt** 0–4

*As of March 19, 2017.

== Top 10 wins per season ==
Season	2002	2003	2004	2005	2006	2007	2008	2009	2010	2011	2012	2013	Total
Wins	0	0	2	5	3	3	9	9	4	1	0	2	38

=== Wins over top 10s per season ===
#	Player	Rank	Event	Surface	Rd	Score
2004
1.	(Thailand) Paradorn Srichaphan	10	Rotterdam, Netherlands	Hard (i)	1R	6–4, 6–3
2.	(Germany) Rainer Schüttler	5	Munich, Germany	Clay	QF	6–1, 7–6^{(7–4)}
2005
3.	(United Kingdom) Tim Henman	7	Australian Open, Melbourne, Australia	Hard	3R	6–4, 6–2, 6–2
4.	(Argentina) Guillermo Coria	9	French Open, Paris, France	Clay	4R	2–6, 6–3, 7–6^{(7–1)}, 6–2
5.	(United States) Andre Agassi	5	Tennis Masters Cup, Shanghai, China	Carpet (i)	RR	6–4, 6–2
6.	(Argentina) Gastón Gaudio	9	Tennis Masters Cup, Shanghai, China	Carpet (i)	RR	6–3, 6–4
7.	(Argentina) Mariano Puerta	10	Tennis Masters Cup, Shanghai, China	Carpet (i)	RR	6–3, 6–2
2006
8.	(Argentina) Gastón Gaudio	10	French Open, Paris, France	Clay	4R	6–3, 6–4, 3–6, 6–3
9.	(Spain) Tommy Robredo	7	Paris, France	Carpet (i)	SF	6–3, 5–7, 6–2
10.	(Spain) Tommy Robredo	6	Tennis Masters Cup, Shanghai, China	Hard (i)	RR	7–6^{(8–6)}, 3–6, 6–1
2007
11.	(Spain) Tommy Robredo	7	Rome, Italy	Clay	QF	1–6, 6–3, 6–3
12.	(Germany) Tommy Haas	10	US Open, New York, United States	Hard	QF	6–3, 6–3, 6–4
13.	(Chile) Fernando González	7	Tennis Masters Cup, Shanghai, China	Hard (i)	RR	6–4, 6–3
2008
14.	(Serbia) Novak Djokovic	3	Davis Cup, Moscow, Russia	Hard (i)	RR	4–6, 3–6, 6–4, ret.
15.	(United States) Andy Roddick	6	Miami, United States	Hard	SF	7–6^{(7–5)}, 6–2
16.	(Spain) Rafael Nadal	2	Miami, United States	Hard	F	6–4, 6–2
17.	(Czech Republic) Tomáš Berdych	9	Davis Cup, Moscow, Russia	Clay (i)	RR	6–3, 2–6, 6–7^{(5–7)}, 6–3, 1–2, ret.
18.	(Argentina) David Nalbandian	7	Davis Cup, Moscow, Russia	Clay	RR	3–6, 6–3, 7–6^{(7–2)}, 6–0
19.	(Spain) Rafael Nadal	1	Paris, France	Hard (i)	QF	6–1, ret.
20.	(France) Jo-Wilfried Tsonga	7	Tennis Masters Cup, Shanghai, China	Hard (i)	RR	6–7^{(6–8)}, 6–4, 7–6^{(7–0)}
21.	(Argentina) Juan Martín del Potro	8	Tennis Masters Cup, Shanghai, China	Hard (i)	RR	6–3, 6–2
22.	(United Kingdom) Andy Murray	4	Tennis Masters Cup, Shanghai, China	Hard (i)	SF	7–5, 6–2
2009
23.	(Spain) Fernando Verdasco	8	French Open, Paris, France	Clay	4R	6–2, 6–2, 6–4
24.	(Chile) Fernando González	10	Montreal, Canada	Hard	3R	7–6^{(7–2)}, 7–5
25.	(Spain) Fernando Verdasco	9	Kuala Lumpur, Malaysia	Hard (i)	F	6–4, 7–5
26.	(Serbia) Novak Djokovic	4	Shanghai, China	Hard	SF	4–6, 6–4, 7–6^{(7–1)}
27.	(Spain) Rafael Nadal	2	Shanghai, China	Hard	F	7–6^{(7–3)}, 6–3
28.	(Spain) Rafael Nadal	2	World Tour Finals, London, England	Hard	RR	6–1,7–6^{(7–4)}
29.	(Sweden) Robin Söderling	9	World Tour Finals, London, England	Hard (i)	RR	7–6^{(7–4)}, 4–6, 6–3
30.	(Switzerland) Roger Federer	1	World Tour Finals, London, England	Hard (i)	SF	6–2, 4–6, 7–5
31.	(Argentina) Juan Martín del Potro	5	World Tour Finals, London, England	Hard (i)	F	6–3, 6–4
2010
32.	(Switzerland) Roger Federer	1	Doha, Qatar	Hard	SF	6–4, 6–4
33.	(Spain) Rafael Nadal	2	Doha, Qatar	Hard	F	0–6, 7–6^{(10–8)}, 6–4
34.	(Spain) Fernando Verdasco	9	Australian Open, Melbourne, Australia	Hard	4R	6–2, 7–5, 4–6, 6–7^{(5–7)}, 6–3
35.	(Czech Republic) Tomáš Berdych	6	Paris, France	Hard (i)	3R	4–6, 7–6^{(7–5)}, 6–0
2011
36.	(Spain) Rafael Nadal	1	Doha, Qatar	Hard	SF	6–3, 6–2
2013
37.	(Spain) David Ferrer	5	Doha, Qatar	Hard	SF	6–2, 6–3
38.	(Serbia) Janko Tipsarević	9	Dubai, United Arab Emirates	Hard	1R	6–0, 7–5

== ATP Tour career earnings ==
Year	Grand Slam singles titles	ATP singles titles	Total singles titles	Earnings ($)	Money list rank
1999	0	0	0	3,137
2000	0	0	0	41,328
2001	0	0	0	153,267
2002	0	0	0	235,304	93
2003	0	2	2	466,384	51
2004	0	2	2	651,372	30
2005	0	1	1	1,628,299	6
2006	0	5	5	2,026,845	4
2007	0	1	1	2,051,775	4
2008	0	3	3	2,317,082	5
2009	0	5	5	3,659,160	6
2010	0	1	1	948,392	21
2011	0	1	1	645,058	47
2012	0	0	0	506,247	57
2013	0	0	0	253,153	23
Career	0	21	21	15,592,351	16

* As of March 18, 2013.

== Russian tournament timeline ==
Tournament	2000	2001	2002	2003	2004	2005	2006	2007	2008	2009	2010	2011	2012	2013	2014	SR	W–L
Russian Tournaments
Moscow				1R	W	1R	W	W	QF	1R	2R	SF	1R			3 / 10	19–7
St. Petersburg				1R	2R	QF	2R	2R	2R							0 / 6	6–5
