= Vera Dushevina =

Russian tennis player

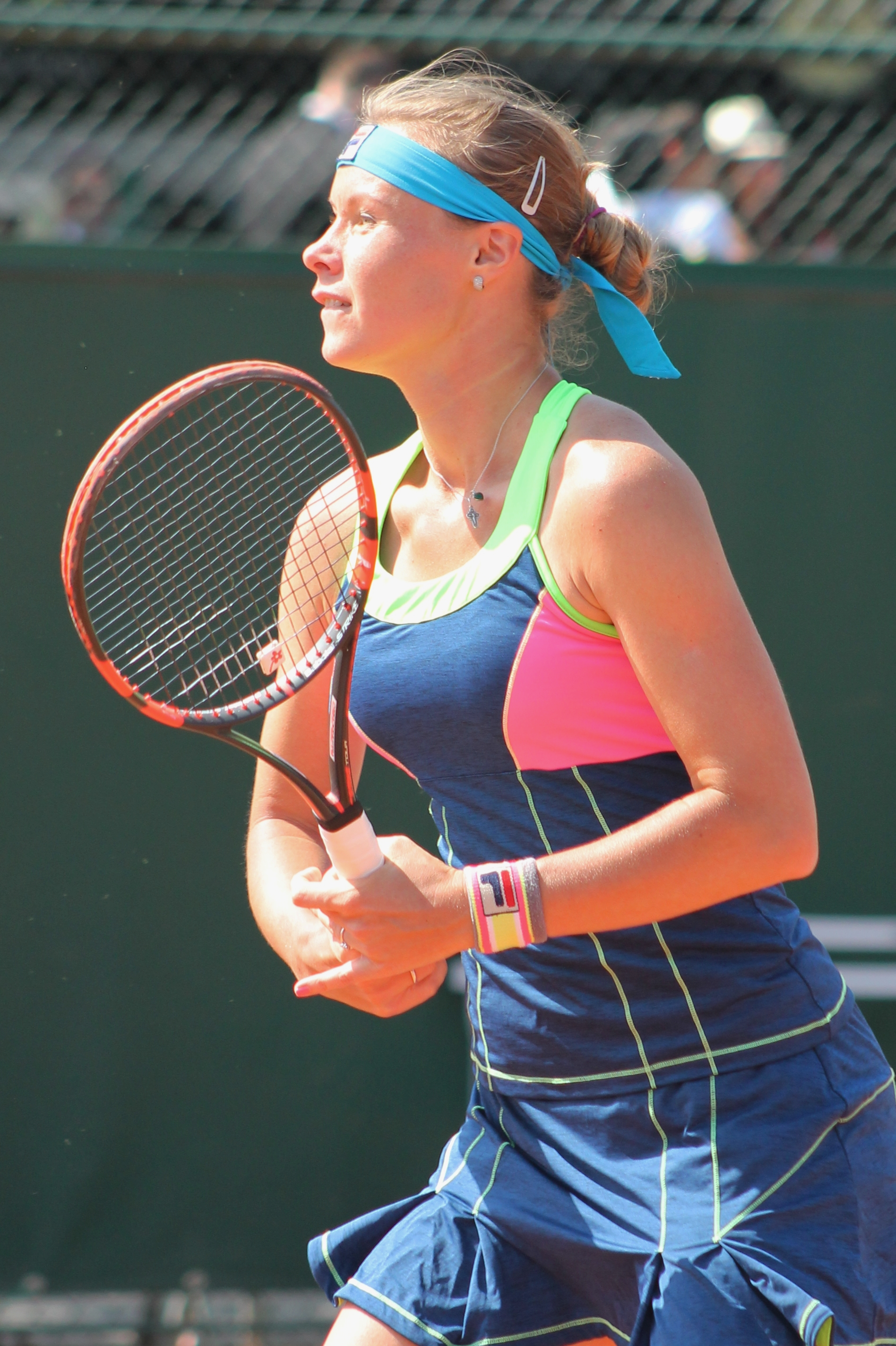
- Dushevina at the 2015 French Open
- Native name: Вера Душевина
- Country (sports): Russia
- Residence: Khimki, Russia
- Born: 6 October 1986 (age 39) Moscow, Soviet Union
- Height: 1.80 m (5 ft 11 in)
- Turned pro: 2003
- Retired: 2017
- Plays: Right-handed (two-handed backhand)
- Prize money: US$ 3,204,753

Singles
- Career record: 329–251
- Career titles: 1
- Highest ranking: No. 31 (4 July 2005)

Grand Slam singles results
- Australian Open: 4R (2005)
- French Open: 2R (2004, 2006, 2007, 2011)
- Wimbledon: 2R (2007, 2008, 2009, 2010)
- US Open: 3R (2004, 2007)

Doubles
- Career record: 196–190
- Career titles: 2
- Highest ranking: No. 27 (25 June 2007)

Grand Slam doubles results
- Australian Open: 3R (2010, 2014)
- French Open: 3R (2007, 2009)
- Wimbledon: QF (2005)
- US Open: 2R (2005, 2007, 2008, 2012)

Grand Slam mixed doubles results
- Wimbledon: SF (2014)

Team competitions
- Fed Cup: W (2005), record 2–1

Vera Yevgenyevna Dushevina (Russian: Вера Евгеньевна Душевина; born 6 October 1986) is a Russian former professional tennis player.

She won one singles title and two doubles titles on the WTA Tour. As a junior, she won the Wimbledon Championships, beating Maria Sharapova in the final, while she reached the final of the French Open losing to Anna-Lena Grönefeld.

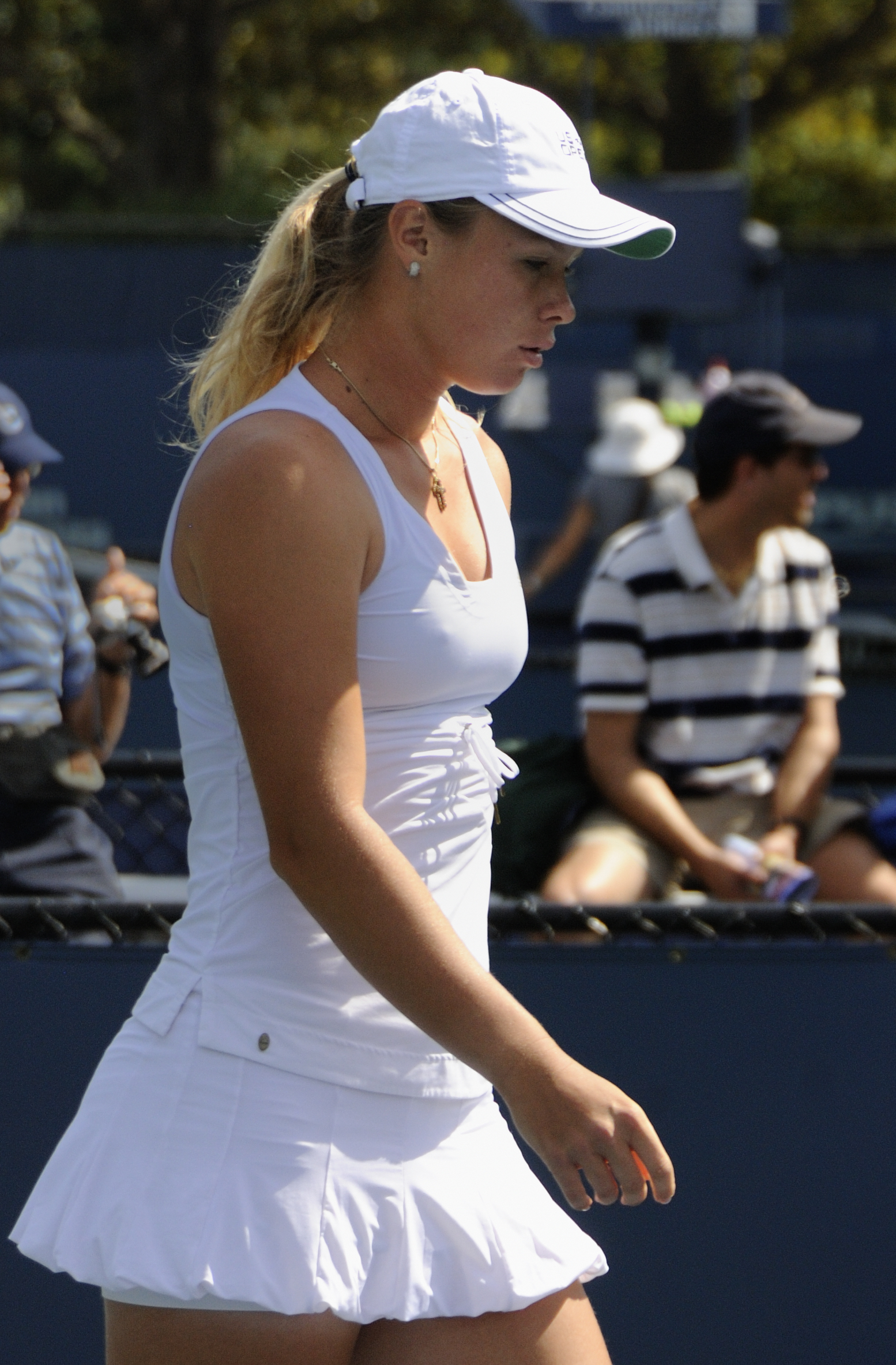
Vera Dushevina at the 2008 US Open

== Personal life ==
Dushevina was born in Moscow. Beside tennis, Vera also played football and basketball.

== Tennis career ==
=== Early years ===
She played her first main-draw match at the 2002 Warsaw Open by qualifying, but lost to Virginia Ruano Pascual 1–6, 6–7. Her first WTA Tour match she won at the 2003 Miami Open. After qualifying, she defeated Patricia Wartusch 6–0, 6–3 but lost to fourth seed Justine Henin 3–6, 2–6 in the second round. She then won her first professional title at the ITF event in Innsbruck, Austria coming through the qualifying draw and defeating Melinda Czink in the final. In her next tournament, she reached her first WTA Tour semifinals at the Nordic Light Open, defeating her first top-50 player, then-world No. 35 Denisa Chládková, 6–2, 6–3 but losing to Jelena Kostanić in the semifinals. She then played her first Grand Slam main-draw match after qualifying but she lost to Ashley Harkleroad in the first round, in straight sets. At the Kremlin Cup, she upset then-world No. 28, Lisa Raymond, 6–2, 7–6, but lost to seventh seed Vera Zvonareva, 2–6, 1–6.

=== 2005–2009 ===
Dushevina began her 2005 campaign by losing in the first round at the Canberra International to Anna-Lena Grönefeld. At the Australian Open, she reached the fourth round of a Grand Slam tournament for the first time, before losing to fifth seed Svetlana Kuznetsova. Along the way, she realized her first top-20 victory over then-world No. 11 Vera Zvonareva, 6–3, 6–3 in the second round. She qualified for the Open Gaz de France and Dubai Championships but fell to Dinara Safina 2–6, 4–6 in the second round and to Nathalie Dechy, 7–6, 4–6, 6–7 in the first round, respectively. She then lost four straight matches in the second round of the Miami Open and the first rounds of Amelia Island, Warsaw and Berlin. However, she bounced back by reaching the quarterfinals of the Internationaux de Strasbourg losing to eventual champion Anabel Medina Garrigues in three sets. At the French Open, she lost to 21st seed Mary Pierce. Dushevina reached her first WTA Tour singles final at the Eastbourne International as a qualifier where she finished runner-up to former world No. 1, Kim Clijsters. In the said tournament, she realized her first top-5 victory over then-world No. 3, Amélie Mauresmo, 6–4, 6–4 in the second round. However, she fell in the first round of Wimbledon to Ana Ivanovic, in straight sets. She then bounced back to reach the semifinals of the Nordic Light Open, losing to Katarina Srebotnik in two. She reached the second round of the Connecticut Open losing to Elena Dementieva. Dushevina then suffered back-to-back to losses to Shahar Pe'er at the second round of the US Open and first round of the China Open. At the quarterfinals of the Korea Open, she fell to top seed Jelena Janković, followed by a first-round loss at the Kremlin Cup to Elena Likhovtseva in three sets, respectively. She then avenged her loss to Janković at the Linz Open, defeating her 7–6, 3–6, 6–0 in the first round, but fell to Sybille Bammer in the next.

Dushevina had a poor 2006 season. She reached the second rounds of the Auckland Open and the Sydney International losing to top-ten players Nadia Petrova and Justine Henin, respectively. She then fell in the first round of the Australian Open to Catalina Castaño in straight sets, and also fell in the second rounds of the WTA indoor event in Paris and the Dubai Tennis Championships to then-world No. 2, Amélie Mauresmo, and then-world No. 4, Maria Sharapova, respectively. She suffered a back-to-back first-round loss at the Qatar Ladies Open and Miami Open. Later, earned her best performance of the year by reaching the third round of the Amelia Island Championships, losing to Patty Schnyder 3–6, 5–7. At the Estoril Open, she was upset by Antonella Serra Zanetti 6–4, 6–4 in the first round. She then suffered four consecutive second-round exits at the German Open and French Open to then-world No. 1, Amélie Mauresmo, at the Italian Open to Patty Schnyder, and the Eastbourne International to Anna-Lena Grönefeld. She then fell five consecutive first-round main-draw matches, at Wimbledon, at the LA Championships, Rogers Cup, US Open, and the China Open. She reached the second rounds of the Korea Open and Japan Open, and then suffered back-to-back main-draw match to compatriot Vera Zvonareva at the Kremlin Cup and Hasselt Cup.

Two years later, she reached her second final at the Nordic Light Open, losing in straight sets to Agnieszka Radwańska. Dushevina reached the final of the Stockholm event again in 2007, losing to Caroline Wozniacki. Dushevina has won one doubles title, the Warsaw Open, playing with Tatiana Perebiynis in 2007. She was also a part of the winning Russian team in the 2005 Fed Cup, winning doubles ties in the quarterfinals and semifinals partnering Dinara Safina. Dushevina began writing a blog for Eurosport about her time on the tour in 2009.

In June 2009 at the Eastbourne International, she lost in 45 minutes to Canadian Aleksandra Wozniak in the quarterfinals, 1–6, 0–6, winning only 17 of the 69 points in the match, and losing every one of her service games.. Dushevina upset world No. 22, Alizé Cornet, in the first round at Wimbledon, but fell to Elena Vesnina in the second. Dushevina won her first WTA Tour career title at the İstanbul Cup, defeating Lucie Hradecká 6–0, 6–1 in the final.

=== 2010–2011 ===
Dushevina started 2010 by qualifying for the Sydney International where she reached the quarterfinals with wins over Casey Dellacqua and Elena Vesnina, but lost to then world No. 1, Serena Williams, in the quarterfinals. She then fell in the first round of the Australian Open to compatriot and fifth seed Elena Dementieva, 2–6, 1–6. At the Pattaya Open, she was upset in the second round by world No. 121, Ekaterina Bychkova, 6–4, 6–1. She then fell in the first rounds of the Dubai Tennis Championships and Miami Open and the second round of the Indian Wells Open.

She reached the third round of the Charleston Open losing to eventual champion, Samantha Stosur, 1–6, 6–3, 1–6, but fell early in the Italian Open to Andrea Petkovic, 3–6, 0–6. In the second round of the Madrid Open, Dushevina lost the most competitive match of her career against world No. 1, Serena Williams. Williams finally won 6–7, 7–6, 7–6, after 3 hours and 26 minutes despite being 5–2 up in the final set. Dushevina had match point at 7–6, 6–5 but could not close out the match. She was also 4–0 up in the final set tie-break before losing. It was also Williams' longest match. She then fell in the first rounds of the French Open and Eastbourne International. At Wimbledon, she upset French Open champion Francesca Schiavone in the first round in three sets, but fell to eventual semifinalist Tsvetana Pironkova in the following round.

She reached the back-to-back quarterfinals in the Slovenia Open and İstanbul Cup, losing to Anna Chakvetadze 6–2, 3–6, 5–7 and Jarmila Groth 5–7, 2–6, respectively. She then fell in the second round of the Cincinnati Open to Jelena Janković 4–6, 6–3, 1–6, and in the qualifying rounds of Rogers Cup and Connecticut Open. In the US Open, she lost in the first round to Alona Bondarenko. In the Korea Open, she upset former world No. 1, Ana Ivanovic, 2–6, 6–4, 6–2 but was beaten in the next round by Klára Zakopalová. She then reached the third round of the China Open as a qualifier losing to Francesca Schiavone. In her final tournament of the year, at the Kremlin Cup, she was able to reach her first semifinal since winning in the 2009 İstanbul Cup, after defeating three consecutive compatriots, Ekaterina Makarova, Elena Vesnina and Anna Chakvetadze, before falling to another, Maria Kirilenko, 1–6, 1–6.

Vera started 2011 by losing in the qualifying draw of the Sydney International. At the Australian Open, she was able to pick up her first win in six years by defeating Maria Elena Camerin 6–3, 3–6, 6–1 but lost to fifth seed Sam Stosur in the next round. She also fell in the first rounds of Paris and Dubai. At Doha, she qualified and defeated María José Martínez Sánchez before losing to Daniela Hantuchová.

=== 2017: Retirement ===
Dushevina announced her retirement from professional tour on 15 August 2017 due to several injuries. She said she would like to concentrate on coaching.

== Performance timelines ==
Key
W	F	SF	QF	#R	RR	Q#	P#	DNQ	A	Z#	PO	G	S	B	NMS	NTI	P	NH

(W) winner; (F) finalist; (SF) semifinalist; (QF) quarterfinalist; (#R) rounds 4, 3, 2, 1; (RR) round-robin stage; (Q#) qualification round; (P#) preliminary round; (DNQ) did not qualify; (A) absent; (Z#) Davis/Fed Cup Zonal Group (with number indication) or (PO) play-off; (G) gold, (S) silver or (B) bronze Olympic/Paralympic medal; (NMS) not a Masters tournament; (NTI) not a Tier I tournament; (P) postponed; (NH) not held; (SR) strike rate (events won / competed); (W–L) win–loss record.
To avoid confusion and double counting, these charts are updated at the conclusion of a tournament or when the player's participation has ended.

Only main-draw results in WTA Tour, Grand Slam tournaments, Fed Cup and Olympic Games are included in win–loss records.

=== Singles ===
Tournament	2002	2003	2004	2005	2006	2007	2008	2009	2010	2011	2012	2013	2014	2015	2016	SR	W–L	Win%
Grand Slam tournaments
Australian Open	A	A	2R	4R	1R	1R	A	1R	1R	2R	1R	1R	Q3	A	Q2	0 / 9	5–9	36%
French Open	A	A	2R	1R	2R	2R	1R	1R	1R	2R	1R	Q3	Q1	Q3	A	0 / 9	4–9	31%
Wimbledon	A	Q1	1R	1R	1R	2R	2R	2R	2R	1R	1R	Q2	Q1	A	A	0 / 9	4–9	31%
US Open	A	1R	3R	2R	1R	3R	1R	1R	1R	2R	2R	1R	A	A	A	0 /11	7–11	39%
Win–loss	0–0	0–1	4–4	4–4	1–4	4–4	1–3	1–4	1–4	3–4	1–4	0–2	0–0	0–0	0–0	0 / 38	20–38	34%
Year-end championships
WTA Elite Trophy	NH							RR	DNQ							0 / 1	1–0	100%
Premier Mandatory & 5 + former
Dubai / Qatar Open (Note: The first Premier 5 event of the year has switched back and forth between the Dubai Tennis Championships and the Qatar Ladies Open since 2009. Dubai was classified as a Premier 5 event from 2009 to 2011 before being succeeded by Doha for the 2012–2014 period. In 2015, Dubai regained its Premier 5 status while Doha was demoted to Premier status. The Premier 5 tournaments were reclassified as WTA 1000 tournaments in 2021.)	NMS						1R	2R	1R	1R	1R	1R	Q1	A	Q1	0 / 6	1–6	14%
Indian Wells Open	A	A	A	A	A	A	A	3R	2R	1R	Q1	Q1	Q1	A	A	0 / 3	3–3	50%
Miami Open	A	2R	3R	2R	1R	4R	A	1R	1R	1R	1R	A	A	A	A	0 / 9	7–9	44%
Berlin / Madrid Open (Note: In 2009, the German Open was replaced by the Madrid Open. The Premier Mandatory tournaments were reclassified as WTA 1000 tournaments in 2021.)	A	A	A	1R	2R	A	3R	QF	2R	1R	Q1	A	A	A	A	0 / 6	7–6	54%
Italian Open	A	A	2R	A	2R	A	1R	1R	1R	2R	Q2	A	A	A	A	0 / 6	3–6	33%
Canadian Open	A	A	A	A	1R	A	A	1R	Q3	A	Q3	A	A	A	A	0 / 2	0–2	0%
Cincinnati Open	NMS							1R	2R	A	Q1	A	A	A	A	0 / 2	1–2	33%
Pan Pacific / Wuhan Open (Note: In 2014, the Pan Pacific Open was downgraded to a Premier event and replaced by the Wuhan Open. The Premier 5 tournaments were reclassified as WTA 1000 tournaments in 2021.)	A	A	A	A	A	Q2	Q3	2R	Q2	A	A	A	A	A	A	0 / 1	1–1	50%
China Open	NMS							1R	3R	Q2	Q2	A	A	A	A	0 / 2	2–2	50%
Charleston Open (former)	A	A	A	A	A	1R	A	NMS								0 / 1	0–1	0%
Kremlin Cup (former)	Q1	2R	2R	1R	1R	QF	2R	NMS								0 / 6	5–6	45%
Zurich Open (former)	A	A	1R	A	A	Q1	NH/NMS									0 / 1	0–1	0%
Win–loss	0–0	2–2	4–4	1–3	2–5	5–3	3–4	7–9	5–7	1–5	0–2	0–1	0–0	0–0	0–0	0 / 45	30–45	40%
Career statistics
	2002	2003	2004	2005	2006	2007	2008	2009	2010	2011	2012	2013	2014	2015	2016	SR	W–L	Win%
Tournaments	1	4	16	19	22	15	17	19	19	17	15	9	1	0	0	Career total: 174		
Titles	0	0	0	0	0	0	0	1	0	0	0	0	0	0	0	Career total: 1		
Finals	0	0	0	1	0	1	1	1	0	0	0	0	0	0	0	Career total: 4		
Hard win–loss	0–0	1–2	7–10	12–10	5–13	15–10	8–10	18–13	15–13	9–10	4–9	4–9	0-1	0–0	0–0	1 / 111	98–110	47%
Clay win–loss	0–1	3–1	4–4	2–5	5–6	3–4	3–5	3–3	3–4	3–5	1–4	0–0	0–0	0–0	0–0	0 / 41	30–42	42%
Grass win–loss	0–0	0–0	0–1	4–2	1–2	1–1	1–2	3–2	1–2	0–1	0–2	0–0	0–0	0–0	0–0	0 / 15	11–15	42%
Carpet win–loss	0–0	1–1	1–1	1–2	1–2	0–0	0–0	0–0	0–0	0–1	0–0	0–0	0–0	0–0	0–0	0 / 7	4–7	36%
Overall win–loss	0–1	5–4	12–16	19–19	12–23	19–15	12–17	24–18	19–19	12–17	5–15	4–9	0–1	0–0	0–0	1 / 174	143–174	45%
Year-end ranking		108	63	39	97	41	88	44	54	86	141	120	478	522		$3,204,753		

=== Doubles ===
Tournament	2002	2003	2004	2005	2006	2007	2008	2009	2010	2011	2012	2013	2014	2015	2016	SR	W–L	Win%
Grand Slam tournaments
Australian Open	A	A	A	A	1R	A	A	2R	3R	1R	2R	2R	3R	A	1R	0 / 8	7–8	47%
French Open	A	A	A	2R	1R	3R	1R	3R	2R	1R	2R	1R	2R	1R	1R	0 / 12	8–12	40%
Wimbledon	A	A	A	QF	2R	1R	2R	2R	2R	3R	1R	1R	2R	2R	Q1	0 / 11	11–11	50%
US Open	A	A	A	2R	1R	2R	2R	2R	1R	2R	2R	1R	A	A	A	0 / 9	6–9	40%
Win–loss	0–0	0–0	0–0	5–3	1–4	3–3	2–3	5–4	4–4	3–4	3–4	1–4	4–3	1–2	0–2	0 / 40	32–40	44%
Premier Mandatory & 5 + former
Dubai / Qatar Open	NMS						1R	1R	2R	2R	QF	1R	1R	A	1R	0 / 8	4–8	33%
Indian Wells Open	A	A	A	A	A	A	A	1R	2R	1R	1R	QF	2R	A	1R	0 / 7	4–7	36%
Miami Open	A	A	A	A	1R	1R	A	2R	1R	1R	QF	1R	A	QF	A	0 / 8	5–8	38%
Berlin / Madrid Open	A	A	A	A	QF	1R	2R	1R	1R	1R	A	A	A	2R	A	0 / 7	4–7	36%
Italian Open	A	A	A	A	1R	A	2R	QF	QF	2R	QF	A	2R	2R	A	0 / 8	10–8	56%
Canadian Open	A	A	A	A	2R	A	A	QF	1R	QF (Note: Withdrew during the tournament. Not counted as a loss.)	2R	A	A	A	A	0 / 5	6–4	60%
Cincinnati Open	NMS							QF	1R	A	2R	2R	A	A	A	0 / 4	4–4	50%
Pan Pacific / Wuhan Open	A	A	A	A	A	QF	1R	1R	A	A	A	A	A	A	A	0 / 3	1–3	25%
China Open	NMS							1R	SF	1R	QF	F	A	A	A	0 / 5	9–5	64%
Charleston Open (former)	A	A	A	A	A	2R	A	NMS								0 / 1	1–1	50%
Kremlin Cup (former)	Q1	A	1R	SF	SF	1R	QF	NMS								0 / 5	5–5	50%
Zurich Open (former)	A	A	1R	A	A	1R	NH/NMS									0 / 2	0–2	0%
Win–loss	0–0	0–0	0–2	2–1	5–5	2–6	3–5	7–9	7–8	4–6	10–7	7–5	2–3	4–3	0–2	0 / 63	53–62	46%
Career statistics
	2002	2003	2004	2005	2006	2007	2008	2009	2010	2011	2012	2013	2014	2015	2016	SR	W–L	Win%
Tournaments	1	1	2	8	22	20	14	19	16	21	22	17	9	9	12	Career total: 193		

== Significant finals ==
=== Premier Mandatory & 5 tournaments ===
==== Doubles: 1 (runner-up) ====
Result	Year	Tournament	Surface	Partner	Opponents	Score
Loss	2013	China Open	Hard	(Spain) Arantxa Parra Santonja	(Zimbabwe) Cara Black (India) Sania Mirza	2–6, 2–6

== WTA Tour finals ==
=== Singles: 4 (1 title, 3 runner-ups) ===
Legend Grand Slam Premier M & Premier 5 Premier (0–1) International (1–2)	Finals by surface Hard (1–2) Clay (0–0) Grass (0–1) Carpet (0–0)

Result	W–L	Date	Tournament	Tier	Surface	Opponent	Score
Loss	0–1	Jun 2005	Eastbourne International, UK	Tier II (Note: Includes WTA Premier and WTA International tournaments. The WTA Tier II tournaments were reclassified as WTA Premier tournaments in 2009, while the WTA Tier III tournaments, WTA Tier IV tournaments and WTA Tier V tournaments were reclassified as WTA International tournaments the same year .)	Grass	(Belgium) Kim Clijsters	5–7, 0–6
Loss	0–2	Jul 2007	Nordic Light Open, Sweden	Tier IV	Hard	(Poland) Agnieszka Radwańska	1–6, 1–6
Loss	0–3	Aug 2008	Nordic Light Open, Sweden	Tier IV	Hard	(Denmark) Caroline Wozniacki	0–6, 2–6
Win	1–3	Aug 2009	İstanbul Cup, Turkey	International	Hard	(Czech Republic) Lucie Hradecká	6–0, 6–1

=== Doubles: 11 (2 titles, 9 runner-ups) ===
Legend Grand Slam tournaments Premier M & Premier 5 (0–1) Premier (1–2) International (1–6)	Finals by surface Hard (1–9) Clay (1–0) Grass (0–0) Carpet (0–0)

Result	W–L	Date	Tournament	Tier	Surface	Partner	Opponents	Score
Win	1–0	Apr 2007	Warsaw Open, Poland	Tier II	Clay	(Ukraine) Tatiana Perebiynis	(Russia) Elena Likhovtseva (Russia) Elena Vesnina	7–5, 3–6, [10–2]
Loss	1–1	Jul 2008	Slovenia Open	Tier IV	Hard	(Russia) Ekaterina Makarova	(Spain) Anabel Medina Garrigues (Spain) Virginia Ruano Pascual	4–6, 1–6
Loss	1–2	Sep 2008	Korea Open	Tier IV	Hard	(Russia) Maria Kirilenko	(Chinese Taipei) Chuang Chia-jung (Chinese Taipei) Hsieh Su-wei	3–6, 0–6
Loss	1–3	Oct 2008	Luxembourg Open	Tier III	Hard (i)	(Ukraine) Mariya Koryttseva	(Romania) Sorana Cîrstea (New Zealand) Marina Eraković	6–2, 3–6, [8–10]
Loss	1–4	Feb 2011	Paris Indoor, France	Premier	Hard (i)	(Russia) Ekaterina Makarova	(United States) Bethanie Mattek-Sands (United States) Meghann Shaughnessy	4–6, 2–6
Loss	1–5	Sep 2011	Korea Open	International	Hard	(Kazakhstan) Galina Voskoboeva	(South Africa) Natalie Grandin (Czech Republic) Vladimíra Uhlířová	6–7^{(5–7)}, 4–6
Loss	1–6	Feb 2012	U.S. National Indoor Championships	International	Hard (i)	(Belarus) Olga Govortsova	(Czech Republic) Andrea Hlaváčková (Czech Republic) Lucie Hradecká	3–6, 4–6
Win	2–6	Aug 2013	Washington Open, U.S.	International	Hard	(Japan) Shuko Aoyama	(Canada) Eugenie Bouchard (United States) Taylor Townsend	6–3, 6–3
Loss	2–7	Oct 2013	China Open	Premier M	Hard	(Spain) Arantxa Parra Santonja	(Zimbabwe) Cara Black (India) Sania Mirza	2–6, 2–6
Loss	2–8	Oct 2015	Tashkent Open, Uzbekistan	International	Hard	(Czech Republic) Kateřina Siniaková	(Russia) Margarita Gasparyan (Russia) Alexandra Panova	1–6, 6–3, [3–10]
Loss	2–9	Feb 2016	St. Petersburg Trophy, Russia	Premier	Hard (i)	(Czech Republic) Barbora Krejčíková	(Switzerland) Martina Hingis (India) Sania Mirza	3–6, 1–6

== ITF finals ==
Legend
$100,000 tournaments
$75,000 tournaments
$50,000 tournaments
$25,000 tournaments
$10,000 tournaments

=== Singles: 1 (title) ===
Result	W–L	Date	Tournament	Tier	Surface	Opponent	Score
Win	1–0	Jul 2003	ITF Innsbruck, Austria	50,000	Clay	(Hungary) Melinda Czink	7–6, 6–2

=== Doubles: 6 (5 titles, 1 runner-up) ===
Result	W–L	Date	Tournament	Tier	Surface	Partner	Opponents	Score
Win	1–0	Oct 2001	ITF Minsk, Belarus	10,000	Carpet (i)	(Russia) Anna Bastrikova	(Belarus) Darya Kustova (Belarus) Tatsiana Uvarova	7–5, 3–6, 6–0
Win	2–0	Sep 2002	ITF Sofia, Bulgaria	25,000	Clay	(Kazakhstan) Galina Voskoboeva	(Italy) Laura Dell'Angelo (Italy) Nathalie Viérin	3–6, 6–4, 6–2
Win	3–0	Oct 2002	ITF Minsk, Belarus	10,000	Carpet (i)	(Russia) Daria Chemarda	(Russia) Olga Puchkova (Belarus) Tatsiana Uvarova	6–1, 6–4
Win	4–0	May 2003	Open de Cagnes-sur-Mer, France	75,000	Clay	(Kazakhstan) Galina Voskoboeva	(Ukraine) Yuliya Beygelzimer (Ukraine) Anna Zaporozhanova	6–3, 6–4
Win	5–0	Nov 2012	Dubai Tennis Challenge, U.A.E.	75,000	Hard	(Italy) Maria Elena Camerin	(Czech Republic) Eva Hrdinová (Czech Republic) Karolína Plíšková	7–5, 6–3
Loss	5–1	Jul 2013	Open de Biarritz, France	100,000	Clay	(Croatia) Ana Vrljić	(Ukraine) Olga Savchuk (Ukraine) Yuliya Beygelzimer	6–2, 4–6, [8–10]

== Junior Grand Slam finals ==
=== Singles: 2 (1 title, 1 runner-up) ===
Result	Year	Tournament	Surface	Opponent	Score
Win	2002	Wimbledon	Grass	(Russia) Maria Sharapova	4–6, 6–1, 6–2
Loss	2003	French Open	Clay	(Germany) Anna-Lena Grönefeld	4–6, 4–6

== Head-to-head record ==
=== Top 10 wins ===
Season	2005	...	2009	...	2010	...	2011	Total
Wins	1		1		1		1	4

#	Player	Rank	Tournament	Surface	Round	Score	VDR
2005
1.	(France) Amélie Mauresmo	No. 3	Eastbourne International, UK	Grass	2R	6–4, 6–4	No. 54
2009
2.	(Russia) Nadia Petrova	No. 10	Eastbourne International, UK	Grass	2R	5–7, 1–0 ret.	No. 52
2010
3.	(Italy) Francesca Schiavone	No. 7	Wimbledon Championships, UK	Grass	1R	6–7^{(0–7)}, 7–5, 6–1	No. 56
2011
4.	(Italy) Francesca Schiavone	No. 8	Korea Open, South Korea	Hard	1R	7–6^{(7–4)}, 6–2	No. 65

== Notes ==
Sporting positions
Preceded by (Russia) Vera Zvonareva	Orange Bowl Girls' Singles Champion; Category: 18 and under 2002	Succeeded by (Czech Republic) Nicole Vaidišová
