= 2006 Hypo Group Tennis International =

- Date: 22–28 May
- Edition: 26th
- Category: International Series
- Draw: 32S / 16D
- Prize money: $380,000
- Surface: Clay / outdoor
- Location: Pörtschach am Wörthersee, Austria
- Venue: Werzer Arena

Champions

Singles
- (Russia) Nikolay Davydenko

Doubles
- (Australia) Paul Hanley / (United States) Jim Thomas
- Hypo Group Tennis International

The 2006 Hypo Group Tennis International was a men's tennis tournament played on outdoor clay courts at the Werzer Arena in Pörtschach am Wörthersee, Austria that was part of the 2006 ATP Tour. It was the 26th edition of the tournament and was won by Nikolay Davydenko in singles and Paul Hanley and Jim Thomas in doubles.

== Finals ==
=== Singles ===
(Russia) Nikolay Davydenko defeated (Romania) Andrei Pavel, 6–3, 6–0

- It was Davydenko's 1st singles title of the year and the 6th of his career.

=== Doubles ===
(Australia) Paul Hanley / (United States) Jim Thomas defeated (Austria) Oliver Marach / (Czech Republic) Cyril Suk, 6–3, 4–6, [10–5]
