= 2004 Kremlin Cup – Women's singles =

Women's singles
- 2004 Kremlin Cup

Final
- Champion: (Russia) Anastasia Myskina
- Runner-up: (Russia) Elena Dementieva
- Score: 7–5, 6–0

Details
- Draw: 28 (2WC/4Q/1LL)
- Seeds: 8

Events
Singles	men	women
Doubles	men	women
← 2003 ·	Kremlin Cup	· 2005 →

Defending champion Anastasia Myskina defeated Elena Dementieva in the final, 7–5, 6–0 to win the women's singles tennis title at the 2004 Kremlin Cup.

== Seeds ==
A champion seed is indicated in bold text while text in italics indicates the round in which that seed was eliminated. The top four seeds received a bye to the second round.

1. (France) ~~Amélie Mauresmo~~ (withdrew due to a left adductor strain)
2. (United States) Lindsay Davenport (semifinals)
3. **(Russia) Anastasia Myskina (champion)**
4. (Russia) Svetlana Kuznetsova (quarterfinals)
5. (Russia) Elena Dementieva (final)
6. (Russia) Vera Zvonareva (quarterfinals)
7. (United States) Venus Williams (quarterfinals)
8. (Russia) Nadia Petrova (second round)

== Draw ==
=== Finals ===
Semifinals
(Russia) Elena Bovina	4	5
5	(Russia) **Elena Dementieva**	**6**	**7**
3	(Russia) **Anastasia Myskina**	**6**	**7^{7}**
2	(United States) Lindsay Davenport	4	6^{1}

Final
5	(Russia) Elena Dementieva	5	0
3	(Russia) **Anastasia Myskina**	**7**	**6**

=== Top half ===
First round
(Russia) **E Bovina**	**6**	**6**
(Slovakia) D Hantuchová	2	3
(Bulgaria) M Maleeva	**7**	4	4
WC	(Russia) **V Dushevina**	5	**6**	**6**
Q	(Russia) A Jidkova	4	4
7	(United States) **V Williams**	**6**	**6**
(Japan) A Sugiyama	2	5
Q	(Czech Republic) **M Paštiková**	**6**	**7**
Q	(Croatia) **S Mamić**	**6**	**6**
(France) M Pierce	0	4
(Switzerland) P Schnyder	2	3
5	(Russia) **E Dementieva**	**6**	**6**

Second round
LL	(Luxembourg) C Schaul	5	3
(Russia) **E Bovina**	**7**	**6**
WC	(Russia) V Dushevina	0	4
7	(United States) **V Williams**	**6**	**6**
4	(Russia) **S Kuznetsova**	**6**	**6**
Q	(Czech Republic) M Paštiková	2	4
Q	(Croatia) S Mamić	3	3
5	(Russia) **E Dementieva**	**6**	**6**

Quarterfinals
(Russia) **E Bovina**	**6**	**6**
7	(United States) V Williams	3	2
4	(Russia) S Kuznetsova	1	3
5	(Russia) **E Dementieva**	**6**	**6**

Semifinals
(Russia) E Bovina	4	5
5	(Russia) **E Dementieva**	**6**	**7**

=== Bottom half ===
First round
6	(Russia) **V Zvonareva**	**6**	**6**
(France) N Dechy	0	2
(Israel) A Smashnova	1	3
(Croatia) **K Šprem**	**6**	**6**
(Colombia) F Zuluaga	1	2
(Russia) **E Likhovtseva**	**6**	**6**
8	(Russia) **N Petrova**	**7**	**6**
(Argentina) P Suárez	5	4
(Italy) S Farina Elia	**7^{7}**	2	5
(Italy) **F Schiavone**	6^{5}	**6**	**7**
Q	(Russia) A Chakvetadze	4	**6**	3
WC	(Russia) **D Safina**	**6**	1	**6**

Second round
6	(Russia) **V Zvonareva**	4	**6**	**6**
(Croatia) K Šprem	**6**	2	3
(Russia) E Likhovtseva	**6**	1	0
3	(Russia) **A Myskina**	2	**6**	**6**
8	(Russia) N Petrova	**6**	3	4
(Italy) **F Schiavone**	0	**6**	**6**
WC	(Russia) D Safina	4	2
2	(United States) **L Davenport**	**6**	**6**

Quarterfinals
6	(Russia) V Zvonareva	**6**	0	5
3	(Russia) **A Myskina**	4	**6**	**7**
(Italy) F Schiavone	4	1
2	(United States) **L Davenport**	**6**	**6**

Semifinals
3	(Russia) **A Myskina**	**6**	**7^{7}**
2	(United States) L Davenport	4	6^{1}

== Qualifying ==
=== Qualifying seeds ===
1. (Greece) Eleni Daniilidou (second round)
2. (Czech Republic) Iveta Benešová (second round)
3. (Spain) Anabel Medina Garrigues (second round)
4. (Spain) Virginia Ruano Pascual (first round)
5. (Luxembourg) Claudine Schaul (qualifying competition, Lucky loser)
6. (Slovakia) Martina Suchá (second round)
7. (Russia) **Alina Jidkova (qualifiers)**
8. (Poland) Marta Domachowska (second round)

=== Qualifiers ===
1. **(Czech Republic) Michaela Paštiková**
2. **(Russia) Alina Jidkova**
3. **(Russia) Anna Chakvetadze**
4. **(Croatia) Sanda Mamić**

=== Lucky loser ===
1. **(Luxembourg) Claudine Schaul**

=== Qualifying draw ===
==== First qualifier ====
First round
1	**(Greece) Eleni Daniilidou**	**6**	**6**
WC	(Russia) Alla Kudryavtseva	4	1
(Ukraine) Olga Lazarchuk	3	0
**(Czech Republic) Michaela Paštiková**	**6**	**6**
**(Russia) Galina Voskoboeva**	3	**6**	**6**
(Russia) Tatiana Panova	**6**	1	4
(Russia) Lioudmila Skavronskaia	3	2
6	**(Slovakia) Martina Suchá**	**6**	**6**

Second round
1	(Greece) Eleni Daniilidou	3	5
**(Czech Republic) Michaela Paštiková**	**6**	**7**
**(Russia) Galina Voskoboeva**	**6**	5	**6**
6	(Slovakia) Martina Suchá	1	**7**	1

Qualifying competition
**(Czech Republic) Michaela Paštiková**	**6**	**6**
(Russia) Galina Voskoboeva	3	4

==== Second qualifier ====
First round
2	**(Czech Republic) Iveta Benešová**	**6**	**6**
WC	(Russia) Ekaterina Kosminskaya	0	2
(Ukraine) Yuliana Fedak	1	0
**(Ukraine) Alona Bondarenko**	**6**	**6**
(Czech Republic) Eva Birnerová	5	**6**	2
**(Slovakia) Janette Husárová**	**7**	1	**6**
(Russia) Irina Bulykina	2	1
7	**(Russia) Alina Jidkova**	**6**	**6**

Second round
2	(Czech Republic) Iveta Benešová	4	3
**(Ukraine) Alona Bondarenko**	**6**	**6**
(Slovakia) Janette Husárová	4	5
7	**(Russia) Alina Jidkova**	**6**	**7**

Qualifying competition
(Ukraine) Alona Bondarenko	1	1
7	**(Russia) Alina Jidkova**	**6**	**6**

==== Third qualifier ====
First round
3	**(Spain) Anabel Medina Garrigues**	**6**	**6**
(Russia) Anastasia Rodionova	1	4
**(Russia) Anna Chakvetadze**	**6**	**6**
(Sweden) Åsa Svensson	4	1
(Ukraine) Tatiana Perebiynis	**6**	4	0^{r}
WC	**(Russia) Ekaterina Makarova**	2	**6**	4
(Spain) Magüi Serna	4	6^{4}
8	**(Poland) Marta Domachowska**	**6**	**7^{7}**

Second round
3	(Spain) Anabel Medina Garrigues	2	1
**(Russia) Anna Chakvetadze**	**6**	**6**
WC	**(Russia) Ekaterina Makarova**	**7^{7}**	**6**
8	(Poland) Marta Domachowska	6^{1}	4

Qualifying competition
**(Russia) Anna Chakvetadze**	**6**	**6**
WC	(Russia) Ekaterina Makarova	4	0

==== Fourth qualifier ====
First round
4	(Spain) Virginia Ruano Pascual	3	1
**(Croatia) Sanda Mamić**	**6**	**6**
**(Czech Republic) Libuše Průšová**	**7**	**7**
(Czech Republic) Sandra Kleinová	5	5
WC	**(Russia) Elena Vesnina**	5	**6**	**6**
(Russia) Nina Bratchikova	**7**	3	2
(Germany) Stephanie Gehrlein	5	1
5	**(Luxembourg) Claudine Schaul**	**7**	**6**

Second round
**(Croatia) Sanda Mamić**	**6**	**6**
(Czech Republic) Libuše Průšová	3	2
WC	(Russia) Elena Vesnina	**7**	1	0
5	**(Luxembourg) Claudine Schaul**	5	**6**	**6**

Qualifying competition
**(Croatia) Sanda Mamić**	**6**	1	**6**
5	(Luxembourg) Claudine Schaul	3	**6**	2
