= 2008 Orange Warsaw Open =

- Date: 9–15 June
- Edition: 8th
- Category: International Series
- Draw: 32S / 16D
- Prize money: € 425,250
- Surface: Clay / outdoor
- Location: Warsaw, Poland
- Venue: Warszawianka Courts

Champions

Singles
- (Russia) Nikolay Davydenko

Doubles
- (Poland) Mariusz Fyrstenberg / (Poland) Marcin Matkowski
← 2007 ·	Orange Warsaw Open

The 2008 Orange Warsaw Open was a men's tennis tournament played on outdoor clay court. It was the 8th edition of the Orange Warsaw Open, and was part of the International Series of the 2008 ATP Tour. It took place at the Warszawianka Courts in Warsaw, Poland, from 9 June through 15 June 2008.

The singles field was led by ATP No. 4, Miami Masters and Pörtschach winner Nikolay Davydenko, defending champion Tommy Robredo, and Viña del Mar and Pörtschach runner-up Juan Mónaco. Also competing were recent Casablanca titlist Gilles Simon, Las Vegas semifinalist Guillermo Cañas, Potito Starace, Marcel Granollers and Albert Montañés.

== Finals ==
=== Singles ===
(Russia) Nikolay Davydenko defeated (Spain) Tommy Robredo, 6–3, 6–3

- It was Nikolay Davydenko's 3rd title of the year, and his 14th overall. It was his 2nd win at the event.

=== Doubles ===
(Poland) Mariusz Fyrstenberg / (Poland) Marcin Matkowski defeated (Russia) Nikolay Davydenko / (Kazakhstan) Yuri Schukin, 6–0, 3–6, 10–4
