= 2005 Kremlin Cup =

- Date: 10–16 October
- Edition: 16th (men) / 10th (women)
- Location: Moscow, Russia
- Venue: Olympic Stadium

Champions

Men's singles
- (Russia) Igor Andreev

Women's singles
- (France) Mary Pierce

Men's doubles
- (Belarus) Max Mirnyi / (Russia) Mikhail Youzhny

Women's doubles
- (United States) Lisa Raymond / (Australia) Samantha Stosur
← 2004 ·	Kremlin Cup	· 2006 →

The 2006 Kremlin Cup was a tennis tournament played on indoor carpet courts. It was the 16th edition of the Kremlin Cup, and was part of the International Series of the 2005 ATP Tour, and of the Tier I Series of the 2005 WTA Tour. It took place at the Olympic Stadium in Moscow, Russia, from 10 October through 16 October 2005.

== Finals ==
=== Men's singles ===
(Russia) Igor Andreev defeated (Germany) Nicolas Kiefer, 5–7, 7–6^{(7–3)}, 6–2

- It was Igor Andreev's 3rd title of the year, and his 3rd overall.

=== Women's singles ===
(France) Mary Pierce defeated (Italy) Francesca Schiavone, 6–4, 6–3

- It was Mary Pierce's 2nd title of the year, and her 18th and final career title overall. It was her 2nd Tier I title of the year and her 5th overall.

=== Men's doubles ===
(Belarus) Max Mirnyi / (Russia) Mikhail Youzhny defeated (Russia) Igor Andreev / (Russia) Nikolay Davydenko, 5–1, 5–1

- It was Mirnyi's 5th title of the year and the 25th of his career. It was Youzhny's 1st title of the year and the 1st of his career.

=== Women's doubles ===
(United States) Lisa Raymond / (Australia) Samantha Stosur defeated (Zimbabwe) Cara Black / (Australia) Rennae Stubbs, 6–2, 6–4

- It was Raymond's 5th title of the year and the 49th of his career. It was Stosur's 6th title of the year and the 6th of his career.
