= 2006 Kremlin Cup – Women's doubles =

Women's doubles
- 2006 Kremlin Cup

Final
- Champions: (Czech Republic) Květa Peschke (Italy) Francesca Schiavone
- Runners-up: (Czech Republic) Iveta Benešová (Russia) Galina Voskoboeva
- Score: 6–4, 6–7^{4}, 6–1

Details
- Seeds: 4

Events
Singles	men	women
Doubles	men	women
← 2005 ·	Kremlin Cup	· 2007 →

The 2006 Kremlin Cup women's doubles took place the week of October 9, 2006 in Moscow, Russia.

== Seeds ==
1. (United States) Lisa Raymond / (Australia) Samantha Stosur (first round)
2. (Zimbabwe) Cara Black / (Australia) Rennae Stubbs (first round)
3. (Czech Republic) Květa Peschke / (Italy) Francesca Schiavone (champions)
4. (Germany) Anna-Lena Grönefeld / (South Africa) Liezel Huber (quarterfinals)

== Draw ==
=== Key ===
- Q = Qualifier
- WC = Wild card
- LL = Lucky loser
- Alt = Alternate
- SE = Special exempt
- PR = Protected ranking
- ITF = ITF entry
- JE = Junior exempt
- w/o = Walkover
- r = Retired
- d = Defaulted
- SR = Special ranking

First round
1	(United States) L Raymond (Australia) S Stosur	2	1
(Russia) S Kuznetsova (Russia) N Petrova	6	6
(Russia) V Dushevina (Russia) M Kirilenko	1	6	6
(Russia) A Chakvetadze (Russia) E Vesnina	6	4	1
3	(Czech Republic) K Peschke (Italy) F Schiavone	6	6
(Ukraine) Y Fedak (Ukraine) M Koryttseva	0	4
Q	(Russia) A Kudryavtseva (Belarus) T Poutchek	6	2	2
WC	(Russia) A Kleybanova (Russia) A Pavlyuchenkova	3	6	6
(United States) M Tu (Russia) V Zvonareva	5	3
(Czech Republic) I Benešová (Russia) G Voskoboeva	7	6
WC	(China) N Li (Czech Republic) N Vaidišová	6^{4}	6	6^{2}
4	(Germany) A-L Grönefeld (South Africa) L Huber	7	4	7
(Russia) A Rodionova (Romania) A Vanc	3	4
(Israel) S Pe'er (Italy) M Santangelo	6	6
(Slovakia) J Husárová (Russia) E Likhovtseva	6	4	6
2	(Zimbabwe) C Black (Australia) R Stubbs	4	6	3

Quarterfinals
(Russia) S Kuznetsova (Russia) N Petrova	3	1	r
(Russia) V Dushevina (Russia) M Kirilenko	6	3
3	(Czech Republic) K Peschke (Italy) F Schiavone	6	2	6
WC	(Russia) A Kleybanova (Russia) A Pavlyuchenkova	4	6	4
(Czech Republic) I Benešová (Russia) G Voskoboeva	6	2	6
4	(Germany) A-L Grönefeld (South Africa) L Huber	2	6	3
(Israel) S Pe'er (Italy) M Santangelo	6	7
(Slovakia) J Husárová (Russia) E Likhovtseva	4	6^{3}

Semifinals
(Russia) V Dushevina (Russia) M Kirilenko	5	5
3	(Czech Republic) K Peschke (Italy) F Schiavone	7	7
(Czech Republic) I Benešová (Russia) G Voskoboeva	6	6
(Israel) S Pe'er (Italy) M Santangelo	4	4

Final
3	(Czech Republic) K Peschke (Italy) F Schiavone	6	6^{4}	6
(Czech Republic) I Benešová (Russia) G Voskoboeva	4	7	1
