= 2006 Hypo Group Tennis International – Doubles =

Doubles
- 2006 Hypo Group Tennis International

Final
- Champions: (Australia) Paul Hanley (United States) Jim Thomas
- Runners-up: (Austria) Oliver Marach (Czech Republic) Cyril Suk
- Score: 6–3, 4–6, [10–5]

Details
- Draw: 16
- Seeds: 4

Events
Singles	Doubles
- Hypo Group Tennis International

Lucas Arnold and Paul Hanley were the defending champions, but did not participate together this year. Arnold partnered Martín García, losing in the semifinals. Hanley partnered Jim Thomas, winning the title.

Hanley and Thomas defeated Oliver Marach and Cyril Suk 6–3, 4–6, [10–5] in the final.

== Seeds ==
1. (Australia) Paul Hanley / (United States) Jim Thomas (champions)
2. (India) Mahesh Bhupathi / (Austria) Julian Knowle (semifinals)
3. (Czech Republic) Lukáš Dlouhý / (Czech Republic) Pavel Vízner (quarterfinals, withdrew)
4. (South Africa) Chris Haggard / (Sweden) Robert Lindstedt (first round)

== Draw ==
Key

- Q = Qualifier
- WC = Wild card
- LL = Lucky loser
- Alt = Alternate
- ITF = ITF entry
- PR = Protected ranking
- SR = Special ranking
- SE = Special exempt
- JE = Junior exempt
- JR = Junior Accelerator Programme entrant
- CO = College Accelerator Programme entrant
- NG = Next Gen Accelerator Program entrant
- w/o = Walkover
- r = Retired
- d = Defaulted

=== Draw ===
First round
1	(Australia) P Hanley (United States) J Thomas	2	6	[10]
(Czech Republic) P Pála (Czech Republic) D Škoch	6	3	[8]
(Czech Republic) F Čermák (Czech Republic) T Zíb	6^{5}	6	[12]
(Czech Republic) T Cibulec (Czech Republic) J Novák	7^{7}	3	[14]
3	(Czech Republic) L Dlouhý (Czech Republic) P Vízner	6	7
WC	(Austria) A Peya (Netherlands) R Wassen	2	5
(Argentina) L Arnold (Argentina) M García	7^{7}	6
(South Africa) J Coetzee (United States) T Parrott	6^{3}	3
(United States) V Spadea (Russia) D Tursunov	6	6^{2}	[10]
(Slovakia) D Hrbatý (Czech Republic) J Levinský	2	7^{7}	[5]
(Austria) O Marach (Czech Republic) C Suk	5	6	[12]
4	(South Africa) C Haggard (Sweden) R Lindstedt	7	4	[10]
Alt	(Argentina) C Berlocq (Brazil) M Daniel	5	3
(Argentina) JI Chela (Peru) L Horna	7	6
(Switzerland) Y Allegro (Australia) J Kerr	5	6	[7]
2	(India) M Bhupathi (Austria) J Knowle	7	4	[10]

Quarterfinals
1	(Australia) P Hanley (United States) J Thomas	6	6
(Czech Republic) T Cibulec (Czech Republic) J Novák	1	2
3	(Czech Republic) L Dlouhý (Czech Republic) P Vízner
(Argentina) L Arnold (Argentina) M García	w/o
(United States) V Spadea (Russia) D Tursunov	4	6	[3]
(Austria) O Marach (Czech Republic) C Suk	6	2	[10]
(Argentina) JI Chela (Peru) L Horna
2	(India) M Bhupathi (Austria) J Knowle	w/o

Semifinals
1	(Australia) P Hanley (United States) J Thomas	6	6
(Argentina) L Arnold (Argentina) M García	3	2
(Austria) O Marach (Czech Republic) C Suk	6	5	[10]
2	(India) M Bhupathi (Austria) J Knowle	1	7	[5]

Final
1	(Australia) P Hanley (United States) J Thomas	6	4	[10]
(Austria) O Marach (Czech Republic) C Suk	3	6	[5]
