= 2005 Kremlin Cup – Women's doubles =

Women's doubles
- 2005 Kremlin Cup

Final
- Champions: (United States) Lisa Raymond (Australia) Samantha Stosur
- Runners-up: (Zimbabwe) Cara Black (Australia) Rennae Stubbs
- Score: 6–2, 6–4

Details
- Seeds: 4

Events
Singles	men	women
Doubles	men	women
← 2004 ·	Kremlin Cup	· 2006 →

== Seeds ==
1. (Zimbabwe) Cara Black / (Australia) Rennae Stubbs (final)
2. (United States) Lisa Raymond / (Australia) Samantha Stosur (champions)
3. (Russia) Svetlana Kuznetsova / (Australia) Alicia Molik (first round)
4. (Russia) Elena Likhovtseva / (Russia) Vera Zvonareva (semifinals)

== Draw ==
=== Key ===
- Q = Qualifier
- WC = Wild card
- LL = Lucky loser
- Alt = Alternate
- SE = Special exempt
- PR = Protected ranking
- ITF = ITF entry
- JE = Junior exempt
- w/o = Walkover
- r = Retired
- d = Defaulted
- SR = Special ranking

First round
1	(Zimbabwe) C Black (Australia) R Stubbs	7	7
(Czech Republic) I Benešová (United States) M Tu	5	6^{5}
(Slovenia) T Križan (United States) J Russell	5	4
(Czech Republic) E Birnerová (Romania) A Vanc	7	6
4	(Russia) E Likhovtseva (Russia) V Zvonareva	6	7
(United States) C Morariu (Switzerland) P Schnyder	3	5
(Russia) A Myskina (Italy) F Pennetta	6	1	1
(Czech Republic) K Peschke (Italy) F Schiavone	2	6	6
(Russia) V Dushevina (Russia) D Safina	6	7
WC	(Russia) E Dementieva (Netherlands) M Krajicek	2	5
Q	(Ukraine) M Koryttseva (Russia) G Voskoboeva	6	6
3	(Russia) S Kuznetsova (Australia) A Molik	4	0
(Switzerland) E Gagliardi (Argentina) ME Salerni	w/o
(Germany) A-L Grönefeld (Bulgaria) M Maleeva
WC	(Russia) A Chakvetadze (Russia) E Vesnina	4	7	2
2	(United States) L Raymond (Australia) S Stosur	6	6^{5}	6

Quarterfinals
1	(Zimbabwe) C Black (Australia) R Stubbs	3	6	6
(Czech Republic) E Birnerová (Romania) A Vanc	6	2	1
4	(Russia) E Likhovtseva (Russia) V Zvonareva	6	6
(Czech Republic) K Peschke (Italy) F Schiavone	1	4
(Russia) V Dushevina (Russia) D Safina	6	1	7
Q	(Ukraine) M Koryttseva (Russia) G Voskoboeva	3	6	6^{5}
(Switzerland) E Gagliardi (Argentina) ME Salerni	6	3	1
2	(United States) L Raymond (Australia) S Stosur	4	6	6

Semifinals
1	(Zimbabwe) C Black (Australia) R Stubbs	3	6	6
4	(Russia) E Likhovtseva (Russia) V Zvonareva	6	3	3
(Russia) V Dushevina (Russia) D Safina	0	6	5
2	(United States) L Raymond (Australia) S Stosur	6	3	7

Final
1	(Zimbabwe) C Black (Australia) R Stubbs	2	4
2	(United States) L Raymond (Australia) S Stosur	6	6
