= 2006 Kremlin Cup – Men's doubles =

Men's doubles
- 2006 Kremlin Cup

Final
- Champions: (France) Fabrice Santoro (Serbia) Nenad Zimonjić
- Runners-up: (Czech Republic) František Čermák (Czech Republic) Jaroslav Levinský
- Score: 6–1, 7–5

Details
- Draw: 16
- Seeds: 4

Events
Singles	men	women
Doubles	men	women
← 2005 ·	Kremlin Cup	· 2007 →

Max Mirnyi and Mikhail Youzhny were the defending champions, but Mirnyi did not participate this year. Youzhny partnered Marat Safin, losing in the first round.

Fabrice Santoro and Nenad Zimonjić won the title, defeating František Čermák and Jaroslav Levinský 6–1, 7–5 in the final.

== Seeds ==
1. (France) Fabrice Santoro / (Serbia) Nenad Zimonjić (champions)
2. (Czech Republic) František Čermák / (Czech Republic) Jaroslav Levinský (final)
3. (South Africa) Chris Haggard / (South Africa) Wesley Moodie (semifinals)
4. (Australia) Jordan Kerr / (Czech Republic) David Škoch (first round)

== Draw ==
=== Key ===
- Q = Qualifier
- WC = Wild card
- LL = Lucky loser
- Alt = Alternate
- SE = Special exempt
- PR = Protected ranking
- ITF = ITF entry
- JE = Junior exempt
- w/o = Walkover
- r = Retired
- d = Defaulted
- SR = Special ranking

First round
1	(France) F Santoro (Serbia) N Zimonjić	6	7^{7}
(Switzerland) Y Allegro (Italy) D Bracciali	3	6^{1}
WC	(Russia) E Kirillov (Russia) D Matsukevich	3	6^{4}
(United States) K Kim (South Korea) H-t Lee	6	7^{7}
3	(South Africa) C Haggard (South Africa) W Moodie	6	6
(France) A Clément (France) P-H Mathieu	3	3
Alt	(Kazakhstan) A Kedryuk (Ukraine) O Tereshchuk	2	3
(Czech Republic) T Cibulec (Czech Republic) J Novák	6	6
(Russia) M Safin (Russia) M Youzhny	3	4
(Russia) I Kunitsyn (Russia) D Tursunov	6	6
(Germany) P Kohlschreiber (Czech Republic) R Vik	6	6
4	(Australia) J Kerr (Czech Republic) D Škoch	4	2
WC	(Russia) T Gabashvili (Russia) E Korolev	3	7	[10]
(United States) E Butoracv (United States) T Parrott	6	5	[3]
(Germany) R Schüttler (Serbia) J Tipsarević	4	3
2	(Czech Republic) F Čermák (Czech Republic) J Levinský	6	6

Quarterfinals
1	(France) F Santoro (Serbia) N Zimonjić	w/o
(United States) K Kim (South Korea) H-t Lee
3	(South Africa) C Haggard (South Africa) W Moodie	4	6	[10]
(Czech Republic) T Cibulec (Czech Republic) J Novák	6	2	[3]
(Russia) I Kunitsyn (Russia) D Tursunov	w/o
(Germany) P Kohlschreiber (Czech Republic) R Vik
WC	(Russia) T Gabashvili (Russia) E Korolev	3	4
2	(Czech Republic) F Čermák (Czech Republic) J Levinský	6	6

Semifinals
1	(France) F Santoro (Serbia) N Zimonjić	6^{3}	6	[10]
3	(South Africa) C Haggard (South Africa) W Moodie	7^{7}	4	[6]
(Russia) I Kunitsyn (Russia) D Tursunov	5	5
2	(Czech Republic) F Čermák (Czech Republic) J Levinský	7	7

Final
1	(France) F Santoro (Serbia) N Zimonjić	6	7
2	(Czech Republic) F Čermák (Czech Republic) J Levinský	1	5
