= 2004 Kremlin Cup – Women's doubles =

Women's doubles
- 2004 Kremlin Cup

Final
- Champions: (Russia) Anastasia Myskina (Russia) Vera Zvonareva
- Runners-up: (Spain) Virginia Ruano Pascual (Argentina) Paola Suárez
- Score: 6–3, 4–6, 6–2

Details
- Draw: 16 (1WC/1Q)
- Seeds: 4

Events
Singles	men	women
Doubles	men	women
← 2003 ·	Kremlin Cup	· 2005 →

Nadia Petrova and Meghann Shaughnessy were the defending champions, but Shaughnessy did not compete this year. Petrova teamed up with Elena Bovina and lost in semifinals to tournament winners Anastasia Myskina and Vera Zvonareva.

Myskina and Zvonareva won the title by defeating Virginia Ruano Pascual and Paola Suárez 6–3, 4–6, 6–2 in the final.

== Seeds ==
1. (Spain) Virginia Ruano Pascual / (Argentina) Paola Suárez (final)
2. (Russia) Svetlana Kuznetsova / (Russia) Elena Likhovtseva (first round)
3. (Russia) Elena Dementieva / (Japan) Ai Sugiyama (semifinals)
4. (Russia) Anastasia Myskina / (Russia) Vera Zvonareva (champions)

== Draw ==
=== Key ===
- Q = Qualifier
- WC = Wild card
- LL = Lucky loser
- Alt = Alternate
- SE = Special exempt
- PR = Protected ranking
- ITF = ITF entry
- JE = Junior exempt
- w/o = Walkover
- r = Retired
- d = Defaulted
- SR = Special ranking

=== Draw ===
First round
1	(Spain) V Ruano Pascual (Argentina) P Suárez	6	6
WC	(Russia) V Dushevina (Russia) G Voskoboeva	2	2
(Ukraine) T Perebiynis (Spain) M Serna	3	4
(Russia) A Rodionova (Russia) D Safina	6	6
3	(Russia) E Dementieva (Japan) A Sugiyama	6	4	6
Q	(Ukraine) Y Fedak (Ukraine) M Koryttseva	3	6	1
(United States) L Davenport (United States) C Morariu	6	6
(Czech Republic) E Birnerová (Czech Republic) L Prusová	1	2
(Czech Republic) G Navrátilová (Czech Republic) M Paštiková	4	1
(Slovakia) J Husárová (Bulgaria) M Maleeva	6	6
(Slovakia) D Hantuchová (Switzerland) P Schnyder	5	3
4	(Russia) A Myskina (Russia) V Zvonareva	7	6
(Czech Republic) I Benešová (Luxembourg) C Schaul	6^{4}	4
(Australia) L McShea (Sweden) Å Svensson	7	6
(Russia) E Bovina (Russia) N Petrova	2	6	6
2	(Russia) S Kuznetsova (Russia) E Likhovtseva	6	3	2

Quarterfinals
1	(Spain) V Ruano Pascual (Argentina) P Suárez	6	7
(Russia) A Rodionova (Russia) D Safina	2	6^{5}
3	(Russia) E Dementieva (Japan) A Sugiyama	2	7	6
(United States) L Davenport (United States) C Morariu	6	5	1
(Slovakia) J Husárová (Bulgaria) M Maleeva	1	4
4	(Russia) A Myskina (Russia) V Zvonareva	6	7
(Australia) L McShea (Sweden) Å Svensson	0	1
(Russia) E Bovina (Russia) N Petrova	6	6

Semifinals
1	(Spain) V Ruano Pascual (Argentina) P Suárez	6	6
3	(Russia) E Dementieva (Japan) A Sugiyama	2	1
4	(Russia) A Myskina (Russia) V Zvonareva	6	6^{7}	6
(Russia) E Bovina (Russia) N Petrova	4	7	4

Final
1	(Spain) V Ruano Pascual (Argentina) P Suárez	3	6	2
4	(Russia) A Myskina (Russia) V Zvonareva	6	4	6

== Qualifying ==
=== Qualifying seeds ===
1. (Ukraine) Alona Bondarenko / (Russia) Galina Fokina (qualifying competition)
2. (Ukraine) Yuliana Fedak / (Ukraine) Mariya Koryttseva (qualified)

=== Qualifiers ===
1. (Ukraine) Yuliana Fedak / (Ukraine) Mariya Koryttseva

=== Qualifying draw ===
First round
1	(Ukraine) Alona Bondarenko (Russia) Galina Fokina	8
(Russia) Alina Jidkova (Russia) Tatiana Panova	2
WC	(Russia) Ekaterina Kosminskaya (Russia) Ekaterina Makarova	3
2	(Ukraine) Yuliana Fedak (Ukraine) Mariya Koryttseva	8

Qualifying competition
1	(Ukraine) Alona Bondarenko (Russia) Galina Fokina	3	7^{7}	5
2	(Ukraine) Yuliana Fedak (Ukraine) Mariya Koryttseva	6	6^{3}	7
