= 2006 Kremlin Cup =

- Date: 9–15 October
- Edition: 17th (men) / 11th (women)
- Surface: carpet / indoor
- Location: Moscow, Russia
- Venue: Olympic Stadium

Champions

Men's singles
- (Russia) Nikolay Davydenko

Women's singles
- (Russia) Anna Chakvetadze

Men's doubles
- (France) Fabrice Santoro / (Serbia) Nenad Zimonjić

Women's doubles
- (Czech Republic) Květa Peschke / (Italy) Francesca Schiavone
← 2005 ·	Kremlin Cup	· 2007 →

The 2006 Kremlin Cup was a tennis tournament played on indoor carpet courts. It was the 17th edition of the Kremlin Cup, and was part of the International Series of the 2006 ATP Tour, and of the Tier I Series of the 2006 WTA Tour. It took place at the Olympic Stadium in Moscow, Russia from 9 October through 15 October 2006.

== Finals ==
=== Men's singles ===
(Russia) Nikolay Davydenko defeated (Russia) Marat Safin, 6–4, 5–7, 6–4

- It was Nikolay Davydenko's 4th title of the year, and his 9th overall. It was his 2nd win at the event after winning in 2004.

=== Women's singles ===
(Russia) Anna Chakvetadze defeated (Russia) Nadia Petrova, 6–4, 6–4

- It was Anna Chakvetadze's 2nd title of the year, and her 2nd overall. It was her 1st Tier I title of the year, and her 1st overall.

=== Men's doubles ===
(France) Fabrice Santoro / (Serbia) Nenad Zimonjić defeated (Czech Republic) František Čermák / (Czech Republic) Jaroslav Levinský, 6–1, 7–5

- It was Santoro's 4th title of the year and the 22nd of his career. It was Zimonjić's 3rd title of the year and the 13th of his career.

=== Women's doubles ===
(Czech Republic) Květa Peschke / (Italy) Francesca Schiavone defeated (Czech Republic) Iveta Benešová / (Russia) Galina Voskoboeva, 6–4, 6–7^{(4–7)}, 6–1

- It was Peschke's 4th title of the year and the 8th of his career. It was Schiavone's 3rd title of the year and the 7th of his career.
