= 2006 Kremlin Cup – Women's singles =

Women's singles
- 2006 Kremlin Cup

Final
- Champion: (Russia) Anna Chakvetadze
- Runner-up: (Russia) Nadia Petrova
- Score: 6–4, 6–4

Details
- Draw: 28
- Seeds: 8

Events
Singles	men	women
Doubles	men	women
- Kremlin Cup

Anna Chakvetadze defeated Nadia Petrova in the final, 6–4, 6–4 to win the women's singles tennis title at the 2006 Kremlin Cup.

Mary Pierce was the reigning champion, but did not compete this year.

== Seeds ==
A champion seed is indicated in bold text while text in italics indicates the round in which that seed was eliminated. The top four seeds received a bye to the second round.

1. (France) Amélie Mauresmo (quarterfinals)
2. (Russia) Maria Sharapova (quarterfinals, withdrew due to right foot strain)
3. (Russia) Svetlana Kuznetsova (second round)
4. (Russia) Elena Dementieva (semifinals)
5. (Russia) Nadia Petrova (final)
6. (Switzerland) Patty Schnyder (quarterfinals)
7. (Russia) Dinara Safina (first round)
8. (Czech Republic) Nicole Vaidišová (semifinals)

== Draw ==
=== Finals ===
Semifinals
8	(Czech Republic) Nicole Vaidišová	0	**6**	6^{3}
5	(Russia) **Nadia Petrova**	**6**	4	**7^{7}**
4	(Russia) Elena Dementieva	5	**6**	0
(Russia) **Anna Chakvetadze**	**7**	3	**6**

Final
5	(Russia) Nadia Petrova	4	4
(Russia) **Anna Chakvetadze**	**6**	**6**

=== Top half ===
First round
(Russia) **E Vesnina**	**6**	1	**7^{13}**
(China) N Li	2	**6**	6^{11}
(Australia) **S Stosur**	4	**6**	**6**
Q	(Switzerland) E Gagliardi	**6**	3	2
WC	(Russia) A Pavlyuchenkova	3	3
8	(Czech Republic) **N Vaidišová**	**6**	**6**
WC	(Russia) V Dushevina	3	2
(Russia) **V Zvonareva**	**6**	**6**
(Russia) **E Likhovtseva**	**6**	**6**
(Italy) ME Camerin	0	1
(Germany) A-L Grönefeld	2	2
5	(Russia) **N Petrova**	**6**	**6**

Second round
1	(France) **A Mauresmo**	5	**6**	**7^{7}**
(Russia) E Vesnina	**7**	3	6^{3}
(Australia) S Stosur	4	1
8	(Czech Republic) **N Vaidišová**	**6**	**6**
3	(Russia) S Kuznetsova	1	3
(Russia) **V Zvonareva**	**6**	**6**
(Russia) E Likhovtseva	3	5
5	(Russia) **N Petrova**	**6**	**7**

Quarterfinals
1	(France) A Mauresmo	**6**	5	6^{3}
8	(Czech Republic) **N Vaidišová**	1	**7**	**7^{7}**
(Russia) V Zvonareva	5	1
5	(Russia) **N Petrova**	**7**	**6**

Semifinals
8	(Czech Republic) N Vaidišová	0	**6**	6^{3}
5	(Russia) **N Petrova**	**6**	4	**7^{7}**

=== Bottom half ===
First round
6	(Switzerland) **P Schnyder**	**6**	**6**
(United States) C Rubin	3	0
Q	(Czech Republic) **I Benešová**	3	**6**	**7**
(Italy) M Santangelo	**6**	3	5
(Israel) **S Pe'er**	**6**	**6**
WC	(Russia) E Bovina	0	2
7	(Russia) D Safina	1	2
(Russia) **A Chakvetadze**	**6**	**6**
(Italy) **F Schiavone**	3	**7**	**7^{7}**
(Russia) M Kirilenko	**6**	5	6^{3}
Q	(Russia) **E Bychkova**	**6**	**6**
Q	(Russia) A Rodionova	3	4

Second round
6	(Switzerland) **P Schnyder**	**7^{7}**	1	**6**
Q	(Czech Republic) I Benešová	6^{3}	**6**	1
(Israel) S Pe'er	**6**	6^{3}	3
4	(Russia) **E Dementieva**	4	**7^{7}**	**6**
(Russia) **A Chakvetadze**	**7^{7}**	**6**
(Italy) F Schiavone	6^{3}	4
Q	(Russia) E Bychkova	4	5
2	(Russia) **M Sharapova**	**6**	**7**

Quarterfinals
6	(Switzerland) P Schnyder	6^{6}	6^{1}
4	(Russia) **E Dementieva**	**7^{8}**	**7^{7}**
(Russia) **A Chakvetadze**	w/o
2	(Russia) M Sharapova

Semifinals
4	(Russia) E Dementieva	5	**6**	0
(Russia) **A Chakvetadze**	**7**	3	**6**
