= 2005 Kremlin Cup – Men's singles =

Men's singles
- 2005 Kremlin Cup

Final
- Champion: (Russia) Igor Andreev
- Runner-up: (Germany) Nicolas Kiefer
- Score: 5–7, 7–6^{(7–3)}, 6–2

Details
- Draw: 32 (4 Q / 3 WC )
- Seeds: 8

Events
Singles	men	women
Doubles	men	women
← 2004 ·	Kremlin Cup	· 2006 →

Nikolay Davydenko was the defending champion, but lost in the first round to Daniele Bracciali

Igor Andreev won in the final 5–7, 7–6^{(7–3)}, 6–2 against Nicolas Kiefer.

== Seeds ==
1. (Russia) Nikolay Davydenko (first round)
2. (Slovakia) Dominik Hrbatý (first round)
3. (Russia) Mikhail Youzhny (quarterfinals)
4. (Belarus) Max Mirnyi (quarterfinals)
5. (United Kingdom) Greg Rusedski (second round)
6. (Germany) Nicolas Kiefer (final)
7. (Russia) Igor Andreev (champion)
8. (Italy) Filippo Volandri (second round)

== Draw ==
Key

- Q = Qualifier
- WC = Wild card
- LL = Lucky loser
- Alt = Alternate
- ITF = ITF entry
- PR = Protected ranking
- SR = Special ranking
- SE = Special exempt
- JE = Junior exempt
- JR = Junior Accelerator Programme entrant
- CO = College Accelerator Programme entrant
- NG = Next Gen Accelerator Program entrant
- w/o = Walkover
- r = Retired
- d = Defaulted

=== Finals ===
Semifinals
7	(Russia) Igor Andreev	5	7	6
WC	(Russia) Dmitry Tursunov	7	5	2
6	(Germany) Nicolas Kiefer	6	6
Q	(Russia) Igor Kunitsyn	2	4

Final
7	(Russia) Igor Andreev	5	7^{7}	6
6	(Germany) Nicolas Kiefer	7	6^{3}	2

=== Top half ===
First round
1	(Russia) N Davydenko	6	4	4
(Italy) D Bracciali	3	6	6
(Czech Republic) J Hernych	6	6
(France) F Serra	4	4
(Czech Republic) R Vik	5	2
(France) A Clément	7	6
(Germany) P Kohlschreiber	4	2
7	(Russia) I Andreev	6	6
3	(Russia) M Youzhny	6	6
Q	(Czech Republic) L Dlouhý	4	3
(United States) P Goldstein	6	6
Q	(Russia) M Ledovskikhn	2	4
(Denmark) K Carlsen	1	0^{r}
WC	(Russia) D Tursunov	6	1
(Romania) R Sabău	0	1
8	(Italy) F Volandri	6	6

Second round
(Italy) D Bracciali	6	7^{8}
(Czech Republic) J Hernych	3	6^{6}
(France) A Clément	2	4
7	(Russia) I Andreev	6	6
3	(Russia) M Youzhny	7	4	6
(United States) P Goldstein	5	6	3
WC	(Russia) D Tursunov	6	7^{8}
8	(Italy) F Volandri	1	6^{6}

Quarterfinals
(Italy) D Bracciali	4	1
7	(Russia) I Andreev	6	6
3	(Russia) M Youzhny	2	6	2
WC	(Russia) D Tursunov	6	4	6

Semifinals
7	(Russia) I Andreev	5	7	6
WC	(Russia) D Tursunov	7	5	2

=== Bottom half ===
First round
6	(Germany) N Kiefer	6	6
(Germany) A Popp	4	1
(Germany) F Mayer	6	6
(Germany) L Burgsmüller	3	2
WC	(Russia) T Gabashvili	6	6
(Luxembourg) G Müller	3	1
WC	(Russia) E Kirillov	1	3
4	(Belarus) M Mirnyi	6	6
5	(United Kingdom) G Rusedski	6	6
(France) M Llodra	3	1
Q	(Russia) I Kunitsyn	6	6
(France) F Santoro	4	4
(Romania) A Pavel	6	6
Q	(Switzerland) S Bohli	4	4
(France) C Saulnier	4	6	6
2	(Slovakia) D Hrbatý	6	3	3

Second round
6	(Germany) N Kiefer	6	6
(Germany) F Mayer	4	3
WC	(Russia) T Gabashvili	6	3	1
4	(Belarus) M Mirnyi	4	6	6
5	(United Kingdom) G Rusedski	6^{5}	3
Q	(Russia) I Kunitsyn	7^{7}	6
(Romania) A Pavel	7^{7}	2	7
(France) C Saulnier	6^{3}	6	5

Quarterfinals
6	(Germany) N Kiefer	6	6
4	(Belarus) M Mirnyi	3	4
Q	(Russia) I Kunitsyn	6	6
(Romania) A Pavel	3	2

Semifinals
6	(Germany) N Kiefer	6	6
Q	(Russia) I Kunitsyn	2	4
