= 2005 Kremlin Cup – Men's doubles =

Men's doubles
- 2005 Kremlin Cup

Final
- Champions: (Belarus) Max Mirnyi (Russia) Mikhail Youzhny
- Runners-up: (Russia) Igor Andreev (Russia) Nikolay Davydenko
- Score: 5–1, 5–1

Details
- Draw: 16
- Seeds: 4

Events
Singles	men	women
Doubles	men	women
← 2004 ·	Kremlin Cup	· 2006 →

Igor Andreev and Nikolay Davydenko were the defending champions, but lost in the final this year.

Max Mirnyi and Mikhail Youzhny won the title, defeating Andreev and Davydenko 5–1, 5–1 in the final.

== Seeds ==
1. (France) Michaël Llodra / (France) Fabrice Santoro (first round)
2. (India) Mahesh Bhupathi / (Czech Republic) Martin Damm (semifinals, withdrew)
3. (Belarus) Max Mirnyi / (Russia) Mikhail Youzhny (champions)
4. (Slovakia) Dominik Hrbatý / (Czech Republic) Jaroslav Levinský (semifinals)

== Draw ==
=== Key ===
- Q = Qualifier
- WC = Wild card
- LL = Lucky loser
- Alt = Alternate
- SE = Special exempt
- PR = Protected ranking
- ITF = ITF entry
- JE = Junior exempt
- w/o = Walkover
- r = Retired
- d = Defaulted
- SR = Special ranking

First round
1	(France) M Llodra (France) F Santoro	5^{7}	4^{6}	2
(Russia) I Andreev (Russia) N Davydenko	4^{3}	5^{8}	5
WC	(Russia) S Demekhine (Russia) I Kunitsyn	3	4^{6}
(Poland) M Fyrstenberg (Romania) R Sabău	5	5^{8}
4	(Slovakia) D Hrbatý (Czech Republic) J Levinský	5	5
(Luxembourg) G Müller (Russia) D Tursunov	3	3
(Germany) N Kiefer (Romania) A Pavel	5	5^{9}
(United States) P Goldstein (United States) J Thomas	2	4^{7}
(Italy) D Bracciali (Italy) F Volandri	5^{7}	5
(Australia) J Kerr (United States) T Parrott	4^{2}	0
(Czech Republic) R Vik (Czech Republic) L Dlouhý	3	4^{5}
3	(Belarus) M Mirnyi (Russia) M Youzhny	5	5^{7}
WC	(Russia) A Sitak (Russia) D Sitak	2	3
Alt	(Russia) P Mukhometov (Russia) E Smirnov	5	5
(South Africa) J Coetzee (Netherlands) R Wassen	5	1	3
2	(India) M Bhupathi (Czech Republic) M Damm	3	5	5

Quarterfinals
(Russia) I Andreev (Russia) N Davydenko	5	5
(Poland) M Fyrstenberg (Romania) R Sabău	2	1
4	(Slovakia) D Hrbatý (Czech Republic) J Levinský	0	5^{7}	5^{7}
(Germany) N Kiefer (Romania) A Pavel	5	4^{3}	4^{5}
(Italy) D Bracciali (Italy) F Volandri	2	1
3	(Belarus) M Mirnyi (Russia) M Youzhny	5	5
Alt	(Russia) P Mukhometov (Russia) E Smirnov	5^{7}	3	1
2	(India) M Bhupathi (Czech Republic) M Damm	4^{4}	5	5

Semifinals
(Russia) I Andreev (Russia) N Davydenko	4^{2}	5^{8}	5^{7}
4	(Slovakia) D Hrbatý (Czech Republic) J Levinský	5	4^{6}	4^{4}
3	(Belarus) M Mirnyi (Russia) M Youzhny	w/o
2	(India) M Bhupathi (Czech Republic) M Damm

Final
(Russia) I Andreev (Russia) N Davydenko	1	1
3	(Belarus) M Mirnyi (Russia) M Youzhny	5	5
