= 2004 Kremlin Cup – Men's doubles =

Men's doubles
- 2004 Kremlin Cup

Final
- Champions: (Russia) Igor Andreev (Russia) Nikolay Davydenko
- Runners-up: (India) Mahesh Bhupathi (Sweden) Jonas Björkman
- Score: 3–6, 6–3, 6–4

Details
- Draw: 16
- Seeds: 4

Events
Singles	men	women
Doubles	men	women
← 2003 ·	Kremlin Cup	· 2005 →

Mahesh Bhupathi and Max Mirnyi were the defending champions, but did not play together this year. Bhupathi partnered Jonas Björkman, losing in the final. Mirnyi partnered Marat Safin, withdrawing from the quarterfinals.

Igor Andreev and Nikolay Davydenko won the title, defeating Bhupathi and Björkman 3–6, 6–3, 6–4 in the final.

== Seeds ==
1. (India) Mahesh Bhupathi / (Sweden) Jonas Björkman (final)
2. (United States) Bob Bryan / (United States) Mike Bryan (first round)
3. (Zimbabwe) Wayne Black / (Zimbabwe) Kevin Ullyett (semifinals)
4. (Israel) Jonathan Erlich / (Israel) Andy Ram (quarterfinals)

== Draw ==
=== Key ===
- Q = Qualifier
- WC = Wild card
- LL = Lucky loser
- Alt = Alternate
- SE = Special exempt
- PR = Protected ranking
- ITF = ITF entry
- JE = Junior exempt
- w/o = Walkover
- r = Retired
- d = Defaulted
- SR = Special ranking

First round
1	(India) M Bhupathi (Sweden) J Björkman	6	4	6
(Sweden) S Aspelin (United States) J Thomas)	4	6	4
(Switzerland) Y Allegrov (Germany) M Kohlmann	w/o
(Sweden) T Johansson (Sweden) R Söderling
4	(Zimbabwe) W Black (Zimbabwe) K Ullyett	6	6
(Slovakia) K Beck (United States) G Oliver	4	1
(Czech Republic) T Berdych (Russia) M Youzhny	1	4
(Poland) M Fyrstenberg (Poland) M Matkowski	6	6
WC	(Russia) T Gabashvili (Belarus) V Voltchkov	3	2
(Russia) I Andreev (Russia) N Davydenko	6	6
(Slovakia) D Hrbatý (Czech Republic) J Levinský	4	3
3	(Israel) J Erlich (Israel) A Ram	6	6
(Argentina) M García (Argentina) S Prieto	5	2
(Czech Republic) L Friedl (Czech Republic) R Štěpánek	7	6
(Belarus) M Mirnyi (Russia) M Safin	7	6^{8}	7^{7}
2	(United States) B Bryan (United States) M Bryan	5	7^{10}	6^{4}

Quarterfinals
1	(India) M Bhupathi (Sweden) J Björkman	7	6
(Switzerland) Y Allegrov (Germany) M Kohlmann	5	4
4	(Zimbabwe) W Black (Zimbabwe) K Ullyett	3	7^{7}	6
(Poland) M Fyrstenberg (Poland) M Matkowski	6	6^{4}	3
(Russia) I Andreev (Russia) N Davydenko	7	6
3	(Israel) J Erlich (Israel) A Ram	5	4
(Czech Republic) L Friedl (Czech Republic) R Štěpánek	w/o
(Belarus) M Mirnyi (Russia) M Safin

Semifinals
1	(India) M Bhupathi (Sweden) J Björkman	6	7^{10}
4	(Zimbabwe) W Black (Zimbabwe) K Ullyett	2	6^{8}
(Russia) I Andreev (Russia) N Davydenko	0	7^{7}	6
(Czech Republic) L Friedl (Czech Republic) R Štěpánek	6	6^{5}	3

Final
1	(India) M Bhupathi (Sweden) J Björkman	6	3	4
(Russia) I Andreev (Russia) N Davydenko	3	6	6
