= 2004 Kremlin Cup – Men's singles =

Men's singles
- 2004 Kremlin Cup

Final
- Champion: (Russia) Nikolay Davydenko
- Runner-up: (United Kingdom) Greg Rusedski
- Score: 3–6, 6–3, 7–5

Details
- Draw: 32 (4 Q / 3 WC )
- Seeds: 8

Events
Singles	men	women
Doubles	men	women
← 2003 ·	Kremlin Cup	· 2005 →

The 2004 Kremlin Cup - Men's Singles was a male tennis tournament which took place at the Olympic Stadium in Moscow. Taylor Dent did not return to defend his title from the 2003 Cup. Nikolay Davydenko won in the final 3–6, 6–3, 7–5 against Greg Rusedski. It was Davydenko's 2nd title of the year and 4th title overall.

== Seeds ==
1. (Russia) Marat Safin (second round)
2. (Sweden) Joachim Johansson (quarterfinals)
3. (Slovakia) Dominik Hrbatý (semifinals)
4. (United States) Vince Spadea (first round)
5. (Russia) Mikhail Youzhny (semifinals)
6. (Czech Republic) Tomáš Berdych (first round)
7. (Italy) Filippo Volandri (second round)
8. (Russia) Nikolay Davydenko (champion)

== Draw ==
=== Key ===
- Q = Qualifier
- WC = Wild card
- LL = Lucky loser
- Alt = Alternate
- SE = Special exempt
- PR = Protected ranking
- ITF = ITF entry
- JE = Junior exempt
- w/o = Walkover
- r = Retired
- d = Defaulted
- SR = Special ranking

=== Finals ===
Semifinals
8	(Russia) Nikolay Davydenko	7	6^{5}	6
5	(Russia) Mikhail Youzhny	5	7^{7}	1
3	(Slovakia) Dominik Hrbatý	4	3
(United Kingdom) Greg Rusedski	6	6

Final
8	(Russia) Nikolay Davydenko	3	6	7
(United Kingdom) Greg Rusedski	6	3	5

=== Top half ===
First round
1	(Russia) M Safin	6^{8}	7^{7}	7^{7}
(Belarus) M Mirnyi	7^{10}	6^{2}	6^{1}
(Czech Republic) R Štěpánek	6	6
(Georgia (country)) I Labadze	2	1
WC	(Russia) T Gabashvili	2	1
(Armenia) S Sargsian	6	6
Q	(Ukraine) S Stakhovsky	0	3
8	(Russia) N Davydenko	6	6
4	(United States) V Spadea	4	6	4
(Russia) I Andreev	6	4	6
(Denmark) K Pless	0	4
(Denmark) K Carlsen	6	6
(Spain) D Sánchez	6	1	2
(Sweden) J Björkman	4	6	6
Q	(Switzerland) M Rosset	6	3	2
5	(Russia) M Youzhny	4	6	6

Second round
1	(Russia) M Safin	6^{8}	6	3
(Czech Republic) R Štěpánek	7^{10}	4	6
(Armenia) S Sargsian	2	4
8	(Russia) N Davydenko	6	6
(Russia) I Andreev	6^{4}	6	1
(Denmark) K Carlsen	7^{7}	4	6
(Sweden) J Björkman	4	2
5	(Russia) M Youzhny	6	6

Quarterfinals
(Czech Republic) R Štěpánek	6^{2}	7	1
8	(Russia) N Davydenko	7^{7}	5	6
(Denmark) K Carlsen	2	6^{5}
5	(Russia) M Youzhny	6	7^{7}

Semifinals
8	(Russia) N Davydenko	7	6^{5}	7
5	(Russia) M Youzhny	5	7^{7}	5

=== Bottom half ===
First round
6	(Czech Republic) T Berdych	3	4
WC	(Russia) I Kunitsyn	6	6
Q	(Switzerland) I Heuberger	4	4
(Slovakia) K Beck	6	6
(Belgium) G Elseneer	2	6^{1}
Q	(Belarus) V Voltchkov	6	7^{7}
(Sweden) T Johansson	4	6	3
3	(Slovakia) D Hrbatý	6	4	6
7	(Italy) F Volandri	3	6	7^{8}
(Sweden) R Söderling	6	1	6^{6}
(Croatia) I Karlović	6^{14}	2
(United Kingdom) G Rusedski	7^{16}	6
(France) C Saulnier	6	5	7^{8}
WC	(Russia) A Stoliarov	4	7	6^{6}
(Czech Republic) J Hernych	4	2
2	(Sweden) J Johansson	6	6

Second round
WC	(Russia) I Kunitsyn	7^{7}	7
(Slovakia) K Beck	6^{5}	5
Q	(Belarus) V Voltchkov	6	5	6^{1}
3	(Slovakia) D Hrbatý	4	7	7^{7}
7	(Italy) F Volandri	2	4
(United Kingdom) G Rusedski	6	6
(France) C Saulnier	2	4
2	(Sweden) J Johansson	6	6

Quarterfinals
WC	(Russia) I Kunitsyn	6^{2}	4
3	(Slovakia) D Hrbatý	7^{7}	6
(United Kingdom) G Rusedski	7^{7}	6^{1}	7^{9}
2	(Sweden) J Johansson	6^{5}	7^{7}	6^{7}

Semifinals
3	(Slovakia) D Hrbatý	4	3
(United Kingdom) G Rusedski	6	6
