= 2005 Kremlin Cup – Women's singles =

Women's singles
- 2005 Kremlin Cup

Final
- Champion: (France) Mary Pierce
- Runner-up: (Italy) Francesca Schiavone
- Score: 6–4, 6–3

Details
- Draw: 28 (3WC/4Q/1LL)
- Seeds: 8

Events
| Singles | men | women |
| Doubles | men | women |
- Kremlin Cup

Mary Pierce defeated Francesca Schiavone in the final, 6–4, 6–3 to win the women's singles tennis title at the 2005 Kremlin Cup. It was Pierce's final career WTA Tour title.

Anastasia Myskina was the two-time defending champion, but lost in the quarterfinals to Elena Dementieva in a rematch of the previous year's final.

== Seeds ==
A champion seed is indicated in bold text while text in italics indicates the round in which that seed was eliminated. The top four seeds received a bye to the second round.

1. (Russia) Maria Sharapova (quarterfinals)
2. (France) Amélie Mauresmo (second round)
3. **(France) Mary Pierce (champion)**
4. (Russia) Elena Dementieva (semifinals)
5. (Switzerland) Patty Schnyder (second round)
6. (Russia) Anastasia Myskina (quarterfinals)
7. (Australia) Alicia Molik (first round)
8. (Russia) Svetlana Kuznetsova (quarterfinals)

== Draw ==
=== Finals ===
Semifinals
(Russia) Dinara Safina | 6^{2} | 3
3 | (France) **Mary Pierce** | **7^{7}** | **6**
4 | (Russia) Elena Dementieva | 3 | 1
(Italy) **Francesca Schiavone** | **6** | **6**

Final
3 | (France) **Mary Pierce** | **6** | **6**
(Italy) Francesca Schiavone | 4 | 3

=== Top half ===
First round
(Germany) **A-L Grönefeld** | 3 | **7** | **6**
LL | (France) V Razzano | **6** | 5 | 1
(Italy) S Farina Elia | 1 | 5
(Russia) **D Safina** | **6** | **7**
Q | (Australia) **S Stosur** | **6** | **6**
7 | (Australia) A Molik | 3 | 2
(Italy) **F Pennetta** | **6** | **7**
(France) N Dechy | 3 | 5
(Russia) V Dushevina | **6** | 2 | 5
(Russia) **E Likhovtseva** | 3 | **6** | **7**
(Russia) A Chakvetadze | **6** | 2 | 5
5 | (Switzerland) **P Schnyder** | 2 | **6** | **7**

Second round
1 | (Russia) **M Sharapova** | 1 | 2
(Germany) A-L Grönefeld | **6** | 4^{r}
(Russia) **D Safina** | 4 | **7^{7}** | **6**
Q | (Australia) S Stosur | **6** | 6^{5} | 4
3 | (France) **M Pierce** | 4 | **6** | **6**
(Italy) F Pennetta | **6** | 2 | 3
(Russia) **E Likhovtseva** | 1 | **6** | **6**
5 | (Switzerland) P Schnyder | **6** | 4 | 3

Quarterfinals
1 | (Russia) M Sharapova | **6** | 4 | 5
(Russia) **D Safina** | 1 | **6** | **7**
3 | (France) **M Pierce** | **7** | 4 | **7^{8}**
(Russia) E Likhovtseva | 5 | **6** | 6^{6}

Semifinals
(Russia) D Safina | 6^{2} | 3
3 | (France) **M Pierce** | **7^{7}** | **6**

=== Bottom half ===
First round
6 | (Russia) **A Myskina** | 2 | **6** | **6**
WC | (Bulgaria) M Maleeva | **6** | 4 | 2
WC | (Russia) E Linetskaya | 2 | 2
(Czech Republic) **K Peschke** | **6** | **6**
Q | (Bulgaria) **S Karatantcheva** | **6** | **6**
(Serbia and Montenegro) J Janković | 2 | 1
8 | (Russia) **S Kuznetsova** | **6** | **6**
Q | (Switzerland) E Gagliardi | 0 | 4
WC | (Russia) M Kirilenko | 2 | 3
(Russia) **V Zvonareva** | **6** | **6**
(Italy) **F Schiavone** | **6** | **6**
Q | (Czech Republic) I Benešová | 3 | 2

Second round
6 | (Russia) **A Myskina** | **6** | 4 | **6**
(Czech Republic) K Peschke | 4 | **6** | 3
Q | (Bulgaria) S Karatantcheva | 0 | 1
4 | (Russia) **E Dementieva** | **6** | **6**
8 | (Russia) **S Kuznetsova** | 3 | **7** | **6**
(Russia) V Zvonareva | **6** | 5 | 2
(Italy) **F Schiavone** | **6** | **6**
2 | (France) A Mauresmo | 1 | 1

Quarterfinals
6 | (Russia) A Myskina | 2 | 3
4 | (Russia) **E Dementieva** | **6** | **6**
8 | (Russia) S Kuznetsova | 3 | 1
(Italy) **F Schiavone** | **6** | **6**

Semifinals
4 | (Russia) E Dementieva | 3 | 1
(Italy) **F Schiavone** | **6** | **6**

== Qualifying ==
=== Qualifying seeds ===
1. (Czech Republic) Klára Koukalová (first round)
2. (Bulgaria) **Sesil Karatantcheva (qualified)**
3. (Slovenia) Katarina Srebotnik (second round)
4. (France) Virginie Razzano (qualifying competition, **lucky loser**)
5. (Czech Republic) Lucie Šafářová (first round)
6. (Czech Republic) **Iveta Benešová (qualified)**
7. (Poland) Marta Domachowska (first round)
8. (Australia) **Samantha Stosur (qualified)**

=== Qualifiers ===
1. (Australia) **Samantha Stosur**
2. (Bulgaria) **Sesil Karatantcheva**
3. (Czech Republic) **Iveta Benešová**
4. (Switzerland) **Emmanuelle Gagliardi**

=== Lucky loser ===
1. (France) **Virginie Razzano**

=== Qualifying draw ===
==== First qualifier ====
First round
1 | (Czech Republic) Klára Koukalová | 2 | 4
**(Bulgaria) Tsvetana Pironkova** | **6** | **6**
**(Zimbabwe) Cara Black** | **6** | **6**
(Ukraine) Kateryna Bondarenko | 4 | 1
WC | (Russia) Elena Vesnina | 1 | 6^{5}
**(Ukraine) Alona Bondarenko** | **6** | **7^{7}**
(Belarus) Anastasiya Yakimova | 0 | 2
8 | **(Australia) Samantha Stosur** | **6** | **6**

Second round
**(Bulgaria) Tsvetana Pironkova** | **6** | **6**
(Zimbabwe) Cara Black | 2 | 3
(Ukraine) Alona Bondarenko | 2 | 4
8 | **(Australia) Samantha Stosur** | **6** | **6**

Qualifying competition
(Bulgaria) Tsvetana Pironkova | 3 | 5
8 | **(Australia) Samantha Stosur** | **6** | **7**

==== Second qualifier ====
First round
2/WC | **(Bulgaria) Sesil Karatantcheva** | **6** | **6**
(Argentina) María Emilia Salerni | 3 | 3
WC | **(Russia) Alisa Kleybanova** | **6** | **6**
(United States) Alexandra Stevenson | 0 | 0
(Luxembourg) Anne Kremer | 5 | 3
**(Russia) Galina Voskoboeva** | **7** | **6**
**(United States) Lisa Raymond** | **6** | **6**
5 | (Czech Republic) Lucie Šafářová | 3 | 3

Second round
2/WC | **(Bulgaria) Sesil Karatantcheva** | 1 | **6** | **6**
WC | (Russia) Alisa Kleybanova | **6** | 1 | 3
(Russia) Galina Voskoboeva | 3 | 0
**(United States) Lisa Raymond** | **6** | **6**

Qualifying competition
2/WC | **(Bulgaria) Sesil Karatantcheva** | 4 | **6** | **6**
(United States) Lisa Raymond | **6** | 2 | 1

==== Third qualifier ====
First round
3 | **(Slovenia) Katarina Srebotnik** | **6** | **7**
(Finland) Emma Laine | 3 | 5
**(Czech Republic) Eva Birnerová** | **6** | **6**
(Russia) Ekaterina Bychkova | 4 | 1
(Czech Republic) Michaela Paštiková | 2 | 1
WC | **(Russia) Ekaterina Makarova** | **6** | **6**
(United States) Meilen Tu | 0 | 1
6 | **(Czech Republic) Iveta Benešová** | **6** | **6**

Second round
3 | (Slovenia) Katarina Srebotnik | 3 | 2
**(Czech Republic) Eva Birnerová** | **6** | **6**
WC | (Russia) Ekaterina Makarova | 4 | 1
6 | **(Czech Republic) Iveta Benešová** | **6** | **6**

Qualifying competition
(Czech Republic) Eva Birnerová | 2 | 1
6 | **(Czech Republic) Iveta Benešová** | **6** | **6**

==== Fourth qualifier ====
First round
4 | **(France) Virginie Razzano** | 5
(Russia) Alina Jidkova | 6^{r}
**(Ukraine) Olga Savchuk** | **6** | **6**
(Ukraine) Viktoriya Kutuzova | 1 | 4
**(Switzerland) Emmanuelle Gagliardi** | **6** | **6**
Alt | (Germany) Vanessa Henke | 1 | 1
**(Russia) Tatiana Panova** | **7^{7}** | 5 | **6**
7 | (Poland) Marta Domachowska | 6^{4} | **7** | 2

Second round
4 | **(France) Virginie Razzano** | **7** | 4 | **6**
(Ukraine) Olga Savchuk | 5 | **6** | 4
**(Switzerland) Emmanuelle Gagliardi** | **6** | **6**
(Russia) Tatiana Panova | 2 | 3

Qualifying competition
4 | (France) Virginie Razzano | 3 | 1
**(Switzerland) Emmanuelle Gagliardi** | **6** | **6**
