= 2006 Kremlin Cup – Men's singles =

Men's singles
- 2006 Kremlin Cup

Final
- Champion: (Russia) Nikolay Davydenko
- Runner-up: (Russia) Marat Safin
- Score: 6–4, 5–7, 6–4

Details
- Draw: 32 (4 Q / 3 WC )
- Seeds: 8

Events
Singles	men	women
Doubles	men	women
← 2005 ·	Kremlin Cup	· 2007 →

Igor Andreev was the defending champion, but did not compete this year.

Nikolay Davydenko won in the final 6–4, 5–7, 6–4 against Marat Safin.

== Seeds ==
1. (Russia) Nikolay Davydenko (champion)
2. (Russia) Dmitry Tursunov (first round)
3. (Russia) Mikhail Youzhny (first round)
4. (Spain) Fernando Verdasco (first round, retired due to illness)
5. (Italy) Filippo Volandri (first round)
6. (France) Julien Benneteau (second round)
7. (France) Fabrice Santoro (semifinals)
8. (France) Paul-Henri Mathieu (first round)

== Draw ==
=== Key ===
- Q = Qualifier
- WC = Wild card
- LL = Lucky loser
- Alt = Alternate
- SE = Special exempt
- PR = Protected ranking
- ITF = ITF entry
- JE = Junior exempt
- w/o = Walkover
- r = Retired
- d = Defaulted
- SR = Special ranking

=== Finals ===
Semifinals
1	(Russia) Nikolay Davydenko	6	6
7	(France) Fabrice Santoro	4	1
(Russia) Marat Safin	6	6
WC	(Russia) Igor Kunitsyn	4	3

Final
1	(Russia) Nikolay Davydenko	6	5	6
(Russia) Marat Safin	4	7	4

=== Top half ===
First round
1	(Russia) N Davydenko	6	6
(Czech Republic) J Vaněk	0	0
(Luxembourg) G Müller	6^{3}	3
WC	(Russia) T Gabashvili	7^{7}	6
(United States) K Kim	0	r
(Belarus) M Mirnyi	6
(Argentina) S Roitman	3	0
6	(France) J Benneteau	6	6
3	(Russia) M Youzhny	2	5
(Germany) P Kohlschreiber	6	7
WC	(Russia) E Korolev	7^{7}	6^{5}	6
Q	(Uzbekistan) D Istomin	6^{2}	7^{7}	3
(South Korea) H-t Lee	4	4
Q	(Russia) K Kravchuk	6	6
(South Africa) W Moodie	3	2
7	(France) F Santoro	6	6

Second round
1	(Russia) N Davydenko	6	6
WC	(Russia) T Gabashvili	4	2
(Belarus) M Mirnyi	6	2	7^{7}
6	(France) J Benneteau	2	6	6^{2}
(Germany) P Kohlschreiber	6	6
WC	(Russia) E Korolev	3	2
Q	(Russia) K Kravchuk	1	1
7	(France) F Santoro	6	6

Quarterfinals
1	(Russia) N Davydenko	6	7
(Belarus) M Mirnyi	3	5
(Germany) P Kohlschreiber	3	5
7	(France) F Santoro	6	7

Semifinals
1	(Russia) N Davydenko	6	6
7	(France) F Santoro	4	1

=== Bottom half ===
First round
8	(France) P-H Mathieu	6^{8}	3
(Serbia) J Tipsarević	7^{10}	6
(Czech Republic) R Vik	6	6
(Czech Republic) J Novák	4	3
(Russia) M Safin	6	6
(France) N Mahut	3	4
(Italy) D Bracciali	6^{4}	6
4	(Spain) F Verdasco	7^{7}	4	r
5	(Italy) F Volandri	1	4
(Czech Republic) J Hernych	6	6
WC	(Russia) I Kunitsyn	6	6
(Germany) R Schüttler	3	2
(France) A Clément	4	6	6
Q	(Germany) M Zverev	6	3	2
Q	(Ukraine) S Stakhovsky	7	4	7^{7}
2	(Russia) D Tursunov	4	6	6^{4}

Second round
(Serbia) J Tipsarević	6	6
(Czech Republic) R Vik	4	4
(Russia) M Safin	3	6	6
(Italy) D Bracciali	6	1	4
(Czech Republic) J Hernych	4	6	2
WC	(Russia) I Kunitsyn	6	4	6
(France) A Clément	6	5	6
Q	(Ukraine) S Stakhovsky	3	7	4

Quarterfinals
(Serbia) J Tipsarević	6^{5}	6	4
(Russia) M Safin	7^{7}	3	6
WC	(Russia) I Kunitsyn	6	6
(France) A Clément	4	2

Semifinals
(Russia) M Safin	6	6
WC	(Russia) I Kunitsyn	4	3
