= 2006 Hypo Group Tennis International – Singles =

Singles
- 2006 Hypo Group Tennis International

Final
- Champion: (Russia) Nikolay Davydenko
- Runner-up: (Romania) Andrei Pavel
- Score: 6–3, 6–0

Details
- Draw: 32
- Seeds: 8

Events
Singles	Doubles
- Hypo Group Tennis International

Defending champion Nikolay Davydenko defeated Andrei Pavel 6–3, 6–0 to win the 2006 Hypo Group Tennis International singles event.

== Seeds ==
1. (Russia) Nikolay Davydenko (champion)
2. (Australia) Lleyton Hewitt (first round)
3. (Slovakia) Dominik Hrbatý (first round)
4. (Russia) Dmitry Tursunov (first round)
5. (Argentina) Juan Ignacio Chela (second round)
6. (Spain) Nicolás Almagro (second round)
7. (Peru) Luis Horna (semifinals, withdrew due to a back injury)
8. (France) Gilles Simon (second round)

== Draws ==
Key

- Q = Qualifier
- WC = Wild card
- LL = Lucky loser
- Alt = Alternate
- ITF = ITF entry
- PR = Protected ranking
- SR = Special ranking
- SE = Special exempt
- JE = Junior exempt
- JR = Junior Accelerator Programme entrant
- CO = College Accelerator Programme entrant
- NG = Next Gen Accelerator Program entrant
- w/o = Walkover
- r = Retired
- d = Defaulted

=== Finals ===
Semifinals
1	(Russia) Nikolay Davydenko	6	6
(Czech Republic) Jiří Novák	2	2
7	(Peru) Luis Horna
(Romania) Andrei Pavel	w/o

Finals
1	(Russia) Nikolay Davydenko	6	6
(Romania) Andrei Pavel	3	0

=== Top half ===
First round
1	(Russia) N Davydenko	6	6
(Czech Republic) T Zíb	3	0
WC	(Ecuador) N Lapentti	6	4	3
Q	(Spain) R Ramírez Hidalgo	4	6	6
(Spain) A Martín	5	6^{5}
(Italy) P Starace	7	7
(Belgium) C Rochus	3	4
6	(Spain) N Almagro	6	6
3	(Slovakia) D Hrbatý	0	6	3
LL	(France) R Gasquet	6	4	6
(Austria) J Melzer	6	7
WC	(Austria) S Koubek	4	5
(Germany) B Phau	3	3
(Czech Republic) J Novák	6	6
(Chinese Taipei) Y-T Wang	3	1
5	(Argentina) JI Chela	6	6

Second round
1	(Russia) N Davydenko	6	6
Q	(Spain) R Ramírez Hidalgo	2	4
(Italy) P Starace	4	6	6
6	(Spain) N Almagro	6	4	1
LL	(France) R Gasquet	0	1
(Austria) J Melzer	6	1	r
(Czech Republic) J Novák	6	3	6
5	(Argentina) JI Chela	1	6	2

Quarterfinals
1	(Russia) N Davydenko	6	6
(Italy) P Starace	2	1
(Austria) J Melzer	7	4	4
(Czech Republic) J Novák	6^{7}	6	6

Semifinals
1	(Russia) N Davydenko	6	6
(Czech Republic) J Novák	2	2

=== Bottom half ===
First round
7	(Peru) L Horna	7	6
(South Africa) W Moodie	6^{3}	3
(Italy) A Seppi	6	6
(Czech Republic) L Dlouhý	3	4
Q	(Italy) L Azzaro	3	6^{6}
(Luxembourg) G Müller	6	7
Q	(Argentina) J Mónaco	7	6
4	(Russia) D Tursunov	6^{4}	2
8	(France) G Simon	7	6
Q	(Germany) T Popp	5	4
WC	(Austria) O Marach	6	6
(United States) V Spadea	4	3
(Romania) A Pavel	7	6
(Argentina) C Berlocq	5	2
(Brazil) M Daniel	3	6	7
2	(Australia) L Hewitt	6	3	6^{3}

Second round
7	(Peru) L Horna	6	6
(Italy) A Seppi	1	1
(Luxembourg) G Müller	2	0
Q	(Argentina) J Mónaco	6	6
8	(France) G Simon	6^{3}	1
WC	(Austria) O Marach	7	6
(Romania) A Pavel	7	6
(Brazil) M Daniel	5	0

Quarterfinals
7	(Peru) L Horna	6	6
Q	(Argentina) J Mónaco	3	4
WC	(Austria) O Marach	4	2
(Romania) A Pavel	6	6

Semifinals
7	(Peru) L Horna
(Romania) A Pavel	w/o
