= 2008 Orange Warsaw Open – Singles =

Singles
- 2008 Orange Warsaw Open

Final
- Champion: (Russia) Nikolay Davydenko
- Runner-up: (Spain) Tommy Robredo
- Score: 6–3, 6–3

Details
- Draw: 32 (4Q / 3WC)
- Seeds: 8

Events
Singles	Doubles
- Orange Warsaw Open

Second-seeded Tommy Robredo was the defending champion, but first-seeded Nikolay Davydenko defeated him 6–3, 6–3, in the final.

== Seeds ==
1. (Russia) Nikolay Davydenko (champion)
2. (Spain) Tommy Robredo (final)
3. (Argentina) Juan Mónaco (semifinals)
4. (France) Gilles Simon (first round)
5. (Argentina) Guillermo Cañas (quarterfinals)
6. (Italy) Potito Starace (second round, retired due to a headache)
7. (Spain) Marcel Granollers (quarterfinals)
8. (Spain) Albert Montañés (second round)

== Draw ==
Key

- Q = Qualifier
- WC = Wild card
- LL = Lucky loser
- Alt = Alternate
- ITF = ITF entry
- PR = Protected ranking
- SR = Special ranking
- SE = Special exempt
- JE = Junior exempt
- JR = Junior Accelerator Programme entrant
- CO = College Accelerator Programme entrant
- NG = Next Gen Accelerator Program entrant
- w/o = Walkover
- r = Retired
- d = Defaulted

=== Finals ===
Semifinals
1	(Russia) Nikolay Davydenko	6	6
(Italy) Fabio Fognini	2	3
3	(Argentina) Juan Mónaco	4	4
2	(Spain) Tommy Robredo	6	6

Final
1	(Russia) Nikolay Davydenko	6	6
2	(Spain) Tommy Robredo	3	3

=== Top half ===
First round
1	(Russia) N Davydenko	6	6
(Uruguay) P Cuevas	3	2
(Argentina) C Berlocq	6	2	6^{5}
(Czech Republic) J Vaněk	1	6	7
(Russia) E Korolev	6	6
(Romania) V Hănescu	4	2
WC	(Poland) D Olejniczak	2	3
6	(Italy) P Starace	6	6
4	(France) G Simon	1	6	3
Q	(Belgium) C Rochus	6	3	6
(Spain) G García López	5	6	4
(Italy) F Fognini	7	0	6
(Spain) S Ventura	6	6
(Serbia) B Pašanski	4	2
(Peru) L Horna	2	7	4
5	(Argentina) G Cañas	6	6^{5}	6

Second round
1	(Russia) N Davydenko	4	7	6
(Czech Republic) J Vaněk	6	5	1
(Russia) E Korolev	7	4
6	(Italy) P Starace	5	0	r
Q	(Belgium) C Rochus	4	r
(Italy) F Fognini	5
(Spain) S Ventura	2	6	3
5	(Argentina) G Cañas	6	1	6

Quarterfinals
1	(Russia) N Davydenko	6	6
(Russia) E Korolev	4	2
(Italy) F Fognini	7	7
5	(Argentina) G Cañas	5	5

Semifinals
1	(Russia) N Davydenko	6	6
(Italy) F Fognini	2	3

=== Bottom half ===
First round
7	(Spain) M Granollers	7	6
Q	(Slovakia) M Mertiňák	6^{2}	4
(Italy) F Volandri	3	4
(Brazil) M Daniel	6	6
(France) F Serra	6
(Argentina) G Coria	3	r
WC	(Poland) J Janowicz	4	3
3	(Argentina) J Mónaco	6	6
8	(Spain) Montañés	7	6
Q	(Czech Republic) D Škoch	6^{4}	4
(Spain) Ó Hernández	3	6	6
(Argentina) S Roitman	6	4	0
Q	(Lithuania) R Berankis	4	3
(United States) W Odesnik	6	6
WC	(Poland) M Przysiężny	5	2
2	(Spain) T Robredo	7	6

Second round
7	(Spain) M Granollers	6	6
(Brazil) M Daniel	2	4
(France) F Serra	5	3
3	(Argentina) J Mónaco	7	6
8	(Spain) Montañés	3	2
(Spain) Ó Hernández	6	6
(United States) W Odesnik	4	1	r
2	(Spain) T Robredo	5	1

Quarterfinals
7	(Spain) M Granollers	4	3
3	(Argentina) J Mónaco	6	6
(Spain) Ó Hernández	6	2	2
2	(Spain) T Robredo	4	6	6

Semifinals
3	(Argentina) J Mónaco	4	4
2	(Spain) T Robredo	6	6
