= 2008 Orange Warsaw Open – Doubles =

Doubles
- 2008 Orange Warsaw Open

Final
- Champions: (Poland) Mariusz Fyrstenberg (Poland) Marcin Matkowski
- Runners-up: (Russia) Nikolay Davydenko (Kazakhstan) Yuri Schukin
- Score: 6–0, 3–6, 10–4

Details
- Draw: 16
- Seeds: 4

Events
Singles	Doubles
- Orange Warsaw Open

Mariusz Fyrstenberg and Marcin Matkowski were the defending champions, and won in the final 6–0, 3–6, 10–4, against Nikolay Davydenko and Yuri Schukin.

== Seeds ==
1. (Poland) Mariusz Fyrstenberg / (Poland) Marcin Matkowski (champions)
2. (Brazil) Marcos Daniel / (Australia) Stephen Huss (quarterfinals)
3. (Slovakia) Michal Mertiňák / (Croatia) Lovro Zovko (quarterfinals)
4. (Spain) Marcel Granollers / (Spain) Santiago Ventura (semifinals)

== Draw ==
Key

- Q = Qualifier
- WC = Wild card
- LL = Lucky loser
- Alt = Alternate
- ITF = ITF entry
- PR = Protected ranking
- SR = Special ranking
- SE = Special exempt
- JE = Junior exempt
- JR = Junior Accelerator Programme entrant
- CO = College Accelerator Programme entrant
- NG = Next Gen Accelerator Program entrant
- w/o = Walkover
- r = Retired
- d = Defaulted

=== Draw ===
First round
1	(Poland) M Fyrstenberg (Poland) M Matkowski	6	6
WC	(Poland) M Gawron (Poland) B Koniusz	2	1
(Argentina) L Arnold Ker (Argentina) G Cañas	5	4
(Czech Republic) J Levinský (Czech Republic) D Škoch	7	6
4	(Spain) M Granollers (Spain) S Ventura	6	6
WC	(Poland) D Olejniczak (Poland) M Przysiężny	4	0
(Czech Republic) T Cibulec (Argentina) S Roitman	3	3
(United States) T Parrott (Slovakia) F Polášek	6	6
(United States) J Cerretani (United Kingdom) R Hutchins	3	1
(Spain) Ó Hernández (Spain) Montañés	6	6
(Switzerland) J-C Scherrer (Netherlands) R Wassen	3	3
3	(Slovakia) M Mertiňák (Croatia) L Zovko	6	6
ALT	(Spain) J Clavet (Spain) T Robredo	1	6	[8]
(Russia) N Davydenko (Kazakhstan) Y Schukin	6	4	[10]
(Australia) A Fisher (United States) J Thomas	3	7	[6]
ALT 2	(Brazil) M Daniel (Australia) S Huss	6	6^{5}	[10]

Quarterfinals
1	(Poland) M Fyrstenberg (Poland) M Matkowski	6	6
(Czech Republic) J Levinský (Czech Republic) D Škoch	3	2
4	(Spain) M Granollers (Spain) S Ventura	6	7
(United States) T Parrott (Slovakia) F Polášek	2	6^{7}
(Spain) Ó Hernández (Spain) Montañés	6	7
3	(Slovakia) M Mertiňák (Croatia) L Zovko	4	5
(Russia) N Davydenko (Kazakhstan) Y Schukin	7	6^{4}	[10]
ALT 2	(Brazil) M Daniel (Australia) S Huss	6^{3}	7	[4]

Semifinals
1	(Poland) M Fyrstenberg (Poland) M Matkowski	2	6	[10]
4	(Spain) M Granollers (Spain) S Ventura	6	1	[8]
(Spain) Ó Hernández (Spain) Montañés	2	1
(Russia) N Davydenko (Kazakhstan) Y Schukin	6	6

Final
1	(Poland) M Fyrstenberg (Poland) M Matkowski	6	3	[10]
(Russia) N Davydenko (Kazakhstan) Y Schukin	0	6	[4]
