= 2004 Kremlin Cup =

- Date: 11–17 October
- Edition: 15th (men) / 9th (women)
- Location: Moscow, Russia
- Venue: Olympic Stadium

Champions

Men's singles
- (Russia) Nikolay Davydenko

Women's singles
- (Russia) Anastasia Myskina

Men's doubles
- (Russia) Igor Andreev / (Russia) Nikolay Davydenko

Women's doubles
- (Russia) Anastasia Myskina / (Russia) Vera Zvonareva
- Kremlin Cup

The 2004 Kremlin Cup was a tennis tournament played on indoor carpet courts. It was the 14th edition of the Kremlin Cup, and was part of the International Series of the 2004 ATP Tour, and of the Tier I Series of the 2004 WTA Tour. It took place at the Olympic Stadium in Moscow, Russia, from 11 October through 17 October 2004. The tournament ended up with victories by Russian players in both male and female singles/doubles competitions and Elena Dementieva additionally finished runner-up in the women's singles. Anastasia Myskina won the ladies singles and the doubles with Vera Zvonareva.

== Finals ==
=== Men's singles ===
(Russia) Nikolay Davydenko defeated (United Kingdom) Greg Rusedski, 3–6, 6–3, 7–5

- It was Nikolay Davydenko's 2nd title of the year, and his 4th overall.

=== Women's singles ===
(Russia) Anastasia Myskina defeated (Russia) Elena Dementieva, 7–5, 6–0

- It was Anastasia Myskina's 3rd title of the year, and her 9th overall. It was her 1st Tier I title of the year and her 2nd overall. This was her second victory at the event after winning the previous year.

=== Men's doubles ===
(Russia) Igor Andreev / (Russia) Nikolay Davydenko defeated (India) Mahesh Bhupati / (Sweden) Jonas Björkman, 3–6, 6–3, 6–4

- It was Andreev's 1st title of the year and the 1st of his career. It was Davydenko's 1st title of the year and the 1st of his career.

=== Women's doubles ===
(Russia) Anastasia Myskina / (Russia) Vera Zvonareva defeated (Spain) Virginia Ruano Pascual / (Argentina) Paola Suárez, 6–3, 4–6, 6–2

- It was Myskina's 2nd title of the year and the 2nd of his career. It was Davydenko's 1st title of the year and the 1st of his career.
