= Francesca Schiavone career statistics =

Career finals
| Discipline | Type | Won | Lost | Total |
|---|---|---|---|---|
| Singles | Grand Slam | 1 | 1 | 2 |
| Singles | Summer Olympics | – | – | – |
| Singles | WTA Finals (Note: Formerly known as: Virginia Slims Championships (until 1995); WTA Tour Championships (until 2014)) | – | – | – |
| Singles | WTA Elite (Note: Elite tier: WTA Tournament of Champions (2009–14); WTA Elite Trophy (2015–present)) | – | – | – |
| Singles | WTA 1000 (Note: Formerly known as: Category 4 & 5 & 6 (until 1990); Tier I (until 2009); WTA Premier Mandatory and 5 (until 2021)) | – | 1 | 1 |
| Singles | WTA 500 (Note: Formerly known as: Category 3 (until 1990); Tier II (until 2009); WTA Premier (until 2021)) | 1 | 3 | 4 |
| Singles | WTA 250 (Note: Formerly known as: Category 1 & 2 (until 1990); Tier III & IV & V (until 2009); WTA International (until 2021)) | 6 | 7 | 13 |
| Singles | Total | 8 | 12 | 20 |
| Doubles | Grand Slam | – | 1 | 1 |
| Doubles | Summer Olympics | – | – | – |
| Doubles | WTA Finals | – | – | – |
| Doubles | WTA Elite | – | – | – |
| Doubles | WTA 1000 | 2 | 2 | 4 |
| Doubles | WTA 500 | 4 | 4 | 8 |
| Doubles | WTA 250 | 1 | 2 | 3 |
| Doubles | Total | 7 | 9 | 16 |
| Total | | 15 | 21 | 36 |

This is a list of the main career statistics of professional Italian tennis player Francesca Schiavone.

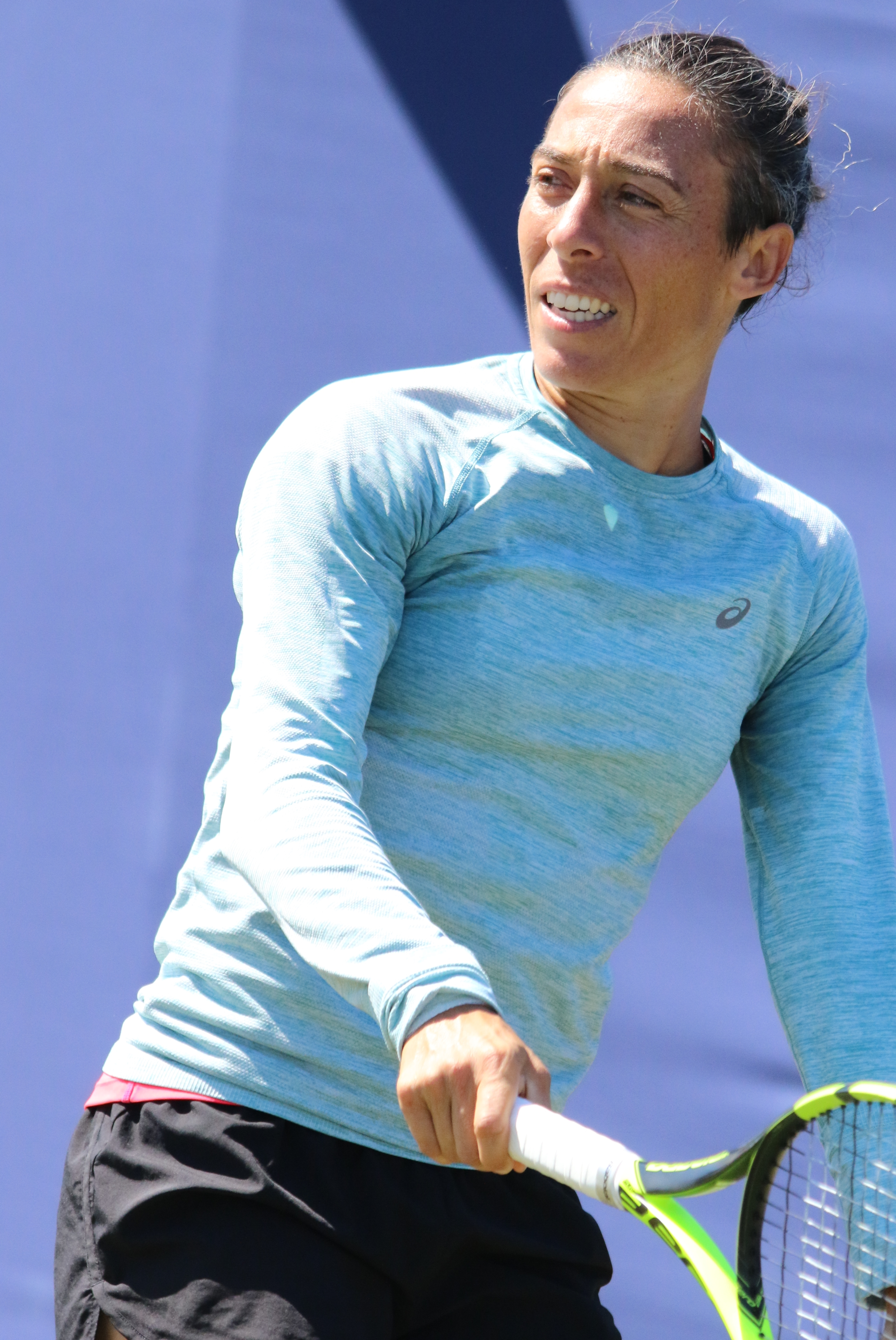
Schiavone at the 2017 Aegon International.

== Performance timelines ==
Key
| W | F | SF | QF | #R | RR | Q# | P# | DNQ | A | Z# | PO | G | S | B | NMS | NTI | P | NH |

(W) winner; (F) finalist; (SF) semifinalist; (QF) quarterfinalist; (#R) rounds 4, 3, 2, 1; (RR) round-robin stage; (Q#) qualification round; (P#) preliminary round; (DNQ) did not qualify; (A) absent; (Z#) Davis/Fed Cup Zonal Group (with number indication) or (PO) play-off; (G) gold, (S) silver or (B) bronze Olympic/Paralympic medal; (NMS) not a Masters tournament; (NTI) not a Tier I tournament; (P) postponed; (NH) not held; (SR) strike rate (events won / competed); (W–L) win–loss record.

Only main-draw results in WTA Tour, Grand Slam tournaments, Billie Jean King Cup (Fed Cup), Hopman Cup and Olympic Games are included in win–loss records.

=== Singles ===
| Tournament | 1998 | 1999 | 2000 | 2001 | 2002 | 2003 | 2004 | 2005 | 2006 | 2007 | 2008 | 2009 | 2010 | 2011 | 2012 | 2013 | 2014 | 2015 | 2016 | 2017 | 2018 | SR | W–L | Win% |
|---|---|---|---|---|---|---|---|---|---|---|---|---|---|---|---|---|---|---|---|---|---|---|---|---|
Grand Slam tournaments
| Australian Open | A | A | A | 1R | 3R | 1R | 2R | 3R | 4R | 2R | 3R | 1R | 4R | QF | 2R | 1R | 1R | 1R | Q2 | 1R | 1R | 0 / 17 | 19–17 | 53% |
| French Open | A | A | Q3 | QF | 3R | 2R | 4R | 4R | 4R | 3R | 3R | 1R | W | F | 3R | 4R | 1R | 3R | 1R | 1R | 1R | 1 / 18 | 40–17 | 70% |
| Wimbledon | A | A | Q1 | 2R | 2R | 3R | 2R | 1R | 1R | 2R | 2R | QF | 1R | 3R | 4R | 1R | 1R | 1R | 2R | 2R | A | 0 / 17 | 18–17 | 51% |
| US Open | A | Q1 | 3R | 1R | 4R | QF | 4R | 3R | 3R | 2R | 2R | 4R | QF | 4R | 1R | 1R | 1R | 1R | 1R | 1R | A | 0 / 18 | 28–18 | 61% |
| Win–loss | 0–0 | 0–0 | 2–1 | 5–4 | 8–4 | 7–4 | 8–4 | 7–4 | 8–4 | 5–4 | 6–4 | 7–4 | 14–3 | 15–4 | 6–4 | 3–4 | 0–4 | 2–4 | 1–3 | 1–4 | 0–2 | 1 / 70 | 105–69 | 60% |
Year-end championship
| WTA Finals | DNQ | | | | | | | | | | | | RR | DNQ | | | | | | | | 0 / 1 | 1–2 | 33% |
National representation
| Summer Olympics | NH | | A | NH | | | QF | NH | | | 3R | NH | | | 2R | NH | | | A | NH | | 0 / 3 | 6–3 | 67% |
| Billie Jean King Cup | A | A | A | A | SF | QF | QF | QF | W | F | QF | W | W | SF | SF | A | A | A | QF | WG2 | A | 3 / 12 | 23–21 | 52% |
WTA 1000 + former^{†} tournaments
| Dubai / Qatar Open (Note: The first Premier 5 event of the year has switched back and forth between the Dubai Tennis Championships and the Qatar Total Open since 2009. Dubai was classified as a Premier 5 event from 2009 to 2011 before being succeeded by Doha for the 2012–2014 period. In 2015, Dubai regained its Premier 5 status while Doha was demoted to Premier status. The Premier 5 tournaments were reclassified as WTA 1000 tournaments in 2021.) | NMS | | | | | | | | | | 2R | 2R | 2R | 3R | 2R | 1R | 1R | A | A | A | Q1 | 0 / 7 | 3–7 | 30% |
| Indian Wells Open | A | A | A | 3R | 2R | 3R | 2R | 2R | A | 3R | 4R | 1R | 3R | 4R | 3R | 2R | 2R | 1R | A | 1R | Q1 | 0 / 15 | 12–15 | 44% |
| Miami Open | A | A | Q3 | 1R | 2R | 2R | 4R | 3R | 2R | 2R | 2R | 2R | 3R | 4R | 2R | 2R | 1R | Q1 | 1R | Q2 | A | 0 / 15 | 9–15 | 38% |
| Berlin / Madrid Open (Note: In 2009, the Berlin Open was replaced by the Madrid Open. The Premier Mandatory tournaments were reclassified as WTA 1000 tournaments in 2021.) | A | A | A | 1R | 1R | 2R | A | A | A | 1R | 2R | 3R | 3R | 3R | 1R | 1R | 2R | 1R | A | 1R | A | 0 / 13 | 9–13 | 47% |
| Italian Open | Q1 | 1R | 1R | QF | 2R | 1R | QF | QF | 3R | 1R | 2R | 2R | 2R | QF | 1R | 1R | 3R | 1R | 1R | A | 1R | 0 / 19 | 18–19 | 49% |
| Canadian Open | A | A | A | A | 3R | 2R | 3R | A | 2R | 3R | 1R | 2R | QF | 3R | A | 2R | A | A | A | A | A | 0 / 10 | 12–10 | 55% |
| Cincinnati Open | NH | | | | | | NMS | | | | | 1R | 2R | 3R | 1R | Q1 | Q2 | A | A | Q2 | A | 0 / 4 | 1–4 | 20% |
| Pan Pacific / Wuhan Open (Note: In 2014, the Toray Pan Pacific Open was downgraded to a Premier event and replaced by the Wuhan Open. The Premier 5 tournaments were reclassified as WTA 1000 tournaments in 2021.) | A | A | A | A | A | A | A | A | A | 2R | 2R | 1R | SF | A | 2R | 1R | 1R | Q1 | A | A | A | 0 / 7 | 6–7 | 46% |
| China Open | NH | | NMS | | | | | | | | | 2R | QF | 2R | 1R | 2R | 1R | A | A | A | A | 0 / 6 | 5–6 | 45% |
| Family Circle Cup^{†} | A | A | A | A | 1R | A | A | A | A | 2R | A | NMS | | | | | | | | | | 0 / 2 | 1–2 | 33% |
| Southern California Open^{†} | NMS | | | | | | 1R | 3R | A | A | NH | | NMS | | | | | | | | | 0 / 2 | 2–2 | 50% |
| Kremlin Cup^{†} | A | A | Q1 | QF | A | QF | QF | F | 2R | A | 1R | NMS | | | | | | | | | | 0 / 6 | 11–6 | 65% |
| Zurich Open^{†} | A | A | A | A | A | A | 1R | QF | 2R | SF | NMS | NH | | | | | | | | | | 0 / 4 | 6–4 | 60% |
| Win–loss | 0–0 | 0–1 | 0–1 | 7–5 | 3–6 | 6–6 | 9–7 | 12–6 | 3–5 | 8–8 | 5–8 | 7–9 | 13–9 | 12–8 | 2–8 | 4–8 | 4–7 | 0–3 | 0–2 | 0–2 | 0–1 | 0 / 110 | 95–110 | 46% |
Career statistics
| | 1998 | 1999 | 2000 | 2001 | 2002 | 2003 | 2004 | 2005 | 2006 | 2007 | 2008 | 2009 | 2010 | 2011 | 2012 | 2013 | 2014 | 2015 | 2016 | 2017 | 2018 | Career | | |
| Tournaments | 0 | 1 | 4 | 22 | 22 | 23 | 23 | 21 | 23 | 23 | 22 | 26 | 22 | 21 | 23 | 25 | 25 | 17 | 14 | 15 | 5 | Career total: 377 | | |
| Titles | 0 | 0 | 0 | 0 | 0 | 0 | 0 | 0 | 0 | 1 | 0 | 1 | 2 | 0 | 1 | 1 | 0 | 0 | 1 | 1 | 0 | Career total: 8 | | |
| Finals | 0 | 0 | 1 | 0 | 0 | 1 | 0 | 3 | 3 | 1 | 0 | 3 | 2 | 1 | 1 | 1 | 0 | 0 | 1 | 2 | 0 | Career total: 20 | | |
| Overall win–loss | 0–0 | 0–1 | 7–4 | 26–22 | 25–23 | 32–25 | 37–25 | 43–24 | 38–25 | 29–24 | 26–24 | 38–25 | 41–23 | 35–24 | 22–25 | 26–26 | 14–25 | 9–17 | 13–14 | 12–15 | 0–5 | 8 / 377 | 473–396 | 54% |
| Win % | – | 0% | 64% | 54% | 52% | 56% | 60% | 64% | 60% | 55% | 52% | 60% | 64% | 59% | 47% | 50% | 36% | 35% | 48% | 44% | 0% | Career total: 54% | | |
| Year-end ranking (Note: 1996: WTA ranking–945, 1997: WTA ranking–496.) | 295 | 184 | 80 | 31 | 41 | 20 | 19 | 13 | 15 | 25 | 30 | 17 | 7 | 11 | 35 | 42 | 82 | 121 | 91 | 90 | | $11,324,245 | | |

=== Doubles ===
| Tournament | 1998 | 1999 | 2000 | 2001 | 2002 | 2003 | 2004 | 2005 | 2006 | 2007 | 2008 | 2009 | 2010 | 2011 | 2012 | 2013 | 2014 | 2015 | 2016 | 2017 | 2018 | SR | W–L | Win% |
|---|---|---|---|---|---|---|---|---|---|---|---|---|---|---|---|---|---|---|---|---|---|---|---|---|
Grand Slam tournaments
| Australian Open | A | A | A | A | 1R | A | 1R | 1R | 3R | 3R | 1R | SF | QF | 1R | 1R | 1R | A | A | A | A | 1R | 0 / 12 | 11–12 | 48% |
| French Open | A | A | A | A | 1R | A | QF | A | QF | 3R | F | 3R | 2R | A | 3R | 3R | 1R | 2R | A | QF | A | 0 / 12 | 24–12 | 67% |
| Wimbledon | A | A | A | A | 1R | 1R | 2R | 1R | QF | 1R | 2R | 2R | A | 1R | SF | 1R | 1R | 2R | A | 1R | A | 0 / 14 | 11–14 | 44% |
| US Open | A | A | A | A | 1R | 2R | 2R | 1R | SF | 1R | 2R | 2R | 1R | 2R | A | 2R | 1R | A | A | 1R | A | 0 / 13 | 10–13 | 43% |
| Win–loss | 0–0 | 0–0 | 0–0 | 0–0 | 0–4 | 1–2 | 5–4 | 0–3 | 12–4 | 4–4 | 7–4 | 8–4 | 4–3 | 1–3 | 6–3 | 3–4 | 0–3 | 2–2 | 0–0 | 3–3 | 0–1 | 0 / 51 | 56–51 | 52% |
Year-end championship
| WTA Finals | DNQ | | | | | | | | SF | DNQ | | | | | | | | | | | | 0 / 1 | 0–1 | 0% |
National representation
| Summer Olympics | NH | | A | NH | | | 2R | NH | | | QF | NH | | | 2R | NH | | | A | NH | | 0 / 3 | 4–3 | 57% |
WTA 1000 + former^{†} tournaments
| Dubai / Qatar Open | NMS | | | | | | | | | | A | SF | QF | 2R | 1R | 2R | 1R | A | A | A | A | 0 / 6 | 6–5 | 55% |
| Indian Wells Open | A | A | A | A | A | A | 1R | 2R | A | 1R | 2R | 1R | 2R | 2R | A | 1R | A | A | A | A | A | 0 / 8 | 4–8 | 33% |
| Miami Open | A | A | A | A | A | A | 2R | 1R | 2R | 2R | 1R | A | QF | A | A | 1R | A | A | A | A | A | 0 / 7 | 5–7 | 42% |
| Berlin / Madrid Open | A | A | A | A | QF | A | A | A | A | A | A | 1R | SF | 2R | A | 1R | 2R | A | A | A | A | 0 / 6 | 7–6 | 50% |
| Italian Open | A | 1R | 1R | A | A | A | 1R | 1R | F | 1R | A | A | A | A | QF | 2R | A | 2R | 1R | A | A | 0 / 10 | 8–9 | 47% |
| Canadian Open | A | A | A | A | A | 1R | A | A | 2R | 2R | A | A | 1R | A | A | A | A | A | A | A | A | 0 / 4 | 2–4 | 33% |
| Cincinnati Open | NH | | | | | | NMS | | | | | 2R | A | 1R | 1R | A | A | A | A | A | A | 0 / 3 | 1–3 | 25% |
| Pan Pacific / Wuhan Open | A | A | A | A | A | A | A | A | A | 1R | SF | W | QF | A | A | A | A | 1R | A | A | A | 1 / 5 | 6–3 | 67% |
| China Open | NH | | NMS | | | | | | | | | SF | A | A | A | A | A | A | A | A | A | 0 / 1 | 3–1 | 75% |
| Southern California Open^{†} | NMS | | | | | | 1R | 2R | A | A | NH | | NMS | | | | | | | | | 0 / 2 | 1–2 | 33% |
| Kremlin Cup^{†} | A | A | A | QF | A | QF | A | QF | W | A | QF | NMS | | | | | | | | | | 1 / 5 | 8–4 | 67% |
| Zurich Open^{†} | A | A | A | A | A | A | 1R | 1R | QF | F | NMS | NH | | | | | | | | | | 0 / 3 | 4–2 | 67% |
Career statistics
| Titles | 0 | 0 | 0 | 1 | 0 | 0 | 1 | 1 | 3 | 0 | 0 | 1 | 0 | 0 | 0 | 0 | 0 | 0 | 0 | 0 | 0 | Career total: 7 | | |
| Finals | 0 | 0 | 0 | 1 | 0 | 1 | 2 | 2 | 5 | 1 | 1 | 1 | 0 | 0 | 1 | 0 | 1 | 0 | 0 | 0 | 0 | Career total: 16 | | |
| Year-end ranking | 383 | 324 | 427 | 121 | 143 | 77 | 40 | 34 | 9 | 48 | 32 | 19 | 43 | 131 | 51 | 100 | 144 | 170 | 430 | 163 | | | | |

== Significant finals ==
=== Grand Slams ===
==== Singles: 2 (1 title, 1 runner-up) ====
| Result | Year | Championship | Surface | Opponent | Score |
|---|---|---|---|---|---|
| Win | 2010 | French Open | Clay | (Australia) Samantha Stosur | 6–4, 7–6^{(7–2)} |
| Loss | 2011 | French Open | Clay | (China) Li Na | 4–6, 6–7^{(0–7)} |

==== Doubles: 1 (1 runner-up) ====
| Result | Year | Championship | Surface | partner | Opponents | Score |
|---|---|---|---|---|---|---|
| Loss | 2008 | French Open | Clay | (Australia) Casey Dellacqua | (Spain) Anabel Medina Garrigues (Spain) Virginia Ruano Pascual | 6–2, 5–7, 4–6 |

=== WTA 1000 ===
==== Singles: 1 runner-up ====
| Result | Year | Tournament | Surface | Opponent | Score |
|---|---|---|---|---|---|
| Loss | 2005 | Kremlin Cup | Carpet (i) | (France) Mary Pierce | 4–6, 3–6 |

==== Doubles: 4 (2 titles, 2 runners-up) ====
| Result | Year | Tournament | Surface | Partner | Opponents | Score |
|---|---|---|---|---|---|---|
| Loss | 2006 | Italian Open | Clay | (Czech Republic) Květa Peschke | (Slovakia) Daniela Hantuchová; (Japan) Ai Sugiyama | 6–3, 3–6, 1–6 |
| Win | 2006 | Kremlin Cup | Carpet (i) | (Czech Republic) Květa Peschke | (Czech Republic) Iveta Benešová; (Russia) Galina Voskoboeva | 6–4, 6–7^{(4–7)}, 6–1 |
| Loss | 2007 | Zurich Open | Hard (i) | (United States) Lisa Raymond | (Czech Republic) Květa Peschke (Australia) Rennae Stubbs | 5–7, 6–7^{(7–1)} |
| Win | 2009 | Pan Pacific Open | Hard | (Russia) Alisa Kleybanova | (Slovakia) Daniela Hantuchová (Japan) Ai Sugiyama | 6–4, 6–2 |

== WTA Tour finals ==
=== Singles: 20 (8 titles, 12 runner-ups) ===
| Legend Grand Slam tournaments (1–1) WTA 1000 (Tier I) (0–1) WTA 500 (Tier II / Premier) (1–3) WTA 250 (Tier III / Tier IV / Tier V / International) (6–7) | Finals by surface Hard (1–6) Clay (7–4) Carpet (0–2) |

| Result | W–L | Date | Tournament | Tier | Surface | Opponent | Score |
|---|---|---|---|---|---|---|---|
| Loss | 0–1 | Jun 2000 | Tashkent Open, Uzbekistan | Tier IV | Hard | (Uzbekistan) Iroda Tulyaganova | 3–6, 6–2, 3–6 |
| Loss | 0–2 | Jan 2003 | Canberra Open, Australia | Tier V | Hard | (United States) Meghann Shaughnessy | 1–6, 1–6 |
| Loss | 0–3 | Sep 2005 | Bali Open, Indonesia | Tier III | Hard | (United States) Lindsay Davenport | 2–6, 4–6 |
| Loss | 0–4 | Oct 2005 | Kremlin Cup, Russia | Tier I | Carpet (i) | (France) Mary Pierce | 4–6, 3–6 |
| Loss | 0–5 | Oct 2005 | Hasselt Cup, Belgium | Tier III | Carpet (i) | (Belgium) Kim Clijsters | 2–6, 2–6 |
| Loss | 0–6 | Jan 2006 | Sydney International, Australia | Tier II | Hard | (Belgium) Justine Henin-Hardenne | 6–4, 5–7, 5–7 |
| Loss | 0–7 | Apr 2006 | Amelia Island Championships, USA | Tier II | Clay | (Russia) Nadia Petrova | 4–6, 4–6 |
| Loss | 0–8 | Oct 2006 | Luxembourg Open | Tier II | Hard | (Ukraine) Alona Bondarenko | 3–6, 2–6 |
| Win | 1–8 | Jul 2007 | Austrian Open | Tier III | Clay | (Austria) Yvonne Meusburger | 6–1, 6–4 |
| Loss | 1–9 | Jul 2009 | Prague Open, Czech Republic | International | Clay | (Austria) Sybille Bammer | 6–7^{(4–7)}, 2–6 |
| Loss | 1–10 | Oct 2009 | Japan Women's Open | International | Hard | (Australia) Samantha Stosur | 5–7, 1–6 |
| Win | 2–10 | Oct 2009 | Kremlin Cup, Russia | Premier | Hard (i) | (Belarus) Olga Govortsova | 6–3, 6–0 |
| Win | 3–10 | Apr 2010 | Barcelona Open, Spain | International | Clay | (Italy) Roberta Vinci | 6–1, 6–1 |
| Win | 4–10 | Jun 2010 | French Open | Grand Slam | Clay | (Australia) Samantha Stosur | 6–4, 7–6^{(7–2)} |
| Loss | 4–11 | Jun 2011 | French Open | Grand Slam | Clay | (China) Li Na | 4–6, 6–7^{(0–7)} |
| Win | 5–11 | May 2012 | Internationaux de Strasbourg, France | International | Clay | (France) Alizé Cornet | 6–4, 6–4 |
| Win | 6–11 | Apr 2013 | Morocco Open | International | Clay | (Spain) Lourdes Domínguez Lino | 6–1, 6–3 |
| Win | 7–11 | Feb 2016 | Rio Open, Brazil | International | Clay | (United States) Shelby Rogers | 2–6, 6–2, 6–2 |
| Win | 8–11 | Apr 2017 | Copa Colsanitas, Colombia | International | Clay | (Spain) Lara Arruabarrena | 6–4, 7–5 |
| Loss | 8–12 | May 2017 | Morocco Open | International | Clay | (Russia) Anastasia Pavlyuchenkova | 5–7, 5–7 |

=== Doubles: 16 (7 titles, 9 runner-ups) ===
| Legend Grand Slam tournaments (0–1) WTA 1000 (Tier I / Premier 5) (2–2) WTA 500 (Tier II) (4–4) WTA 250 (Tier III / International) (1–2) | Finals by surface Hard (4–4) Clay (2–4) Carpet (1–0) |

| Result | W–L | Date | Tournament | Tier | Surface | Partner | Opponent | Score |
|---|---|---|---|---|---|---|---|---|
| Win | 1–0 | Jul 2001 | Sopot Open, Poland | Tier III | Clay | (South Africa) Joannette Kruger | (Ukraine) Yuliya Beygelzimer; (Australia) Anastasia Rodionova | 6–4, 6–0 |
| Loss | 1–1 | May 2003 | Warsaw Open, Poland | Tier II | Clay | (Greece) Eleni Daniilidou | (South Africa) Liezel Huber; (Bulgaria) Magdalena Maleeva | 6–3, 4–6, 2–6 |
| Loss | 1–2 | Feb 2004 | Paris Open, France | Tier II | Hard | (Italy) Silvia Farina Elia | (Austria) Barbara Schett; (Switzerland) Patty Schnyder | 3–6, 2–6 |
| Win | 2–2 | May 2004 | Warsaw Open, Poland | Tier II | Clay | (Italy) Silvia Farina Elia | (Argentina) Gisela Dulko; (Argentina) Patricia Tarabini | 3–6, 6–2, 6–1 |
| Win | 3–2 | Feb 2005 | Qatar Open | Tier II | Hard | (Australia) Alicia Molik | (Zimbabwe) Cara Black; (South Africa) Liezel Huber | 6–3, 6–4 |
| Loss | 3–3 | Oct 2005 | Filderstadt Open, Germany | Tier II | Hard (i) | (Czech Republic) Květa Peschke | (Slovakia) Daniela Hantuchová; (Russia) Anastasia Myskina | 6–7^{(1–7)}, 1–6 |
| Win | 4–3 | Feb 2006 | Dubai Tennis Championships, UAE | Tier II | Hard | (Czech Republic) Květa Peschke | (Russia) Svetlana Kuznetsova; (Russia) Nadia Petrova | 3–6, 7–6^{(7–1)}, 6–3 |
| Loss | 4–4 | May 2006 | Italian Open | Tier I | Clay | (Czech Republic) Květa Peschke | (Slovakia) Daniela Hantuchová; (Japan) Ai Sugiyama | 6–3, 3–6, 1–6 |
| Loss | 4–5 | Jul 2006 | Silicon Valley Classic, USA | Tier II | Hard | (South Korea) Cho Yoon-jeong | (Zimbabwe) Cara Black; (United States) Lisa Raymond | 6–7^{(5–7)}, 1–6 |
| Win | 5–5 | Oct 2006 | Luxembourg Open | Tier II | Hard (i) | (Czech Republic) Květa Peschke | (Germany) Anna-Lena Grönefeld; (South Africa) Liezel Huber | 2–6, 6–4, 6–1 |
| Win | 6–5 | Oct 2006 | Kremlin Cup, Russia | Tier I | Carpet | (Czech Republic) Květa Peschke | (Czech Republic) Iveta Benešová; (Russia) Galina Voskoboeva | 6–4, 6–7^{(4–7)}, 6–1 |
| Loss | 6–6 | Oct 2007 | Zurich Open, Switzerland | Tier I | Hard (i) | (United States) Lisa Raymond | (Czech Republic) Květa Peschke; (Australia) Rennae Stubbs | 5–7, 6–7^{(1–7)} |
| Loss | 6–7 | Jun 2008 | French Open | Grand Slam | Clay | (Australia) Casey Dellacqua | (Spain) Anabel Medina Garrigues (Spain) Virginia Ruano Pascual | 6–2, 5–7, 4–6 |
| Win | 7–7 | Oct 2009 | Pan Pacific Open, Japan | Premier 5 | Hard (i) | (Russia) Alisa Kleybanova | (Slovakia) Daniela Hantuchová; (Japan) Ai Sugiyama | 6–4, 6–2 |
| Loss | 7–8 | Apr 2012 | Barcelona Open, Spain | International | Clay | (Italy) Flavia Pennetta | (Italy) Sara Errani (Italy) Roberta Vinci | 0–6, 2–6 |
| Loss | 7–9 | Feb 2014 | Brasil Tennis Cup | International | Hard | (Spain) Sílvia Soler Espinosa | (Spain) Anabel Medina Garrigues (Kazakhstan) Yaroslava Shvedova | 6–7^{(1–7)}, 6–2, [3–10] |

== ITF Circuit finals ==
=== Singles: 3 (3 runner-ups) ===
Legend
$25,000 tournaments

| Result | W–L | Date | Tournament | Tier | Surface | Opponent | Score |
|---|---|---|---|---|---|---|---|
| Loss | 0–1 | Oct 1998 | ITF São Paulo, Brazil | 25,000 | Hard | (Greece) Christína Papadáki | 6–4, 4–6, 2–6 |
| Loss | 0–2 | Nov 1999 | ITF Jaffa, Israel | 25,000 | Hard | (Netherlands) Yvette Basting | 3–6, 4–6 |
| Loss | 0–3 | Feb 2000 | ITF Rockford, United States | 25,000 | Hard (i) | (Czech Republic) Dája Bedáňová | 6–2, 3–6, 1–6 |

=== Doubles: 2 (1 title, 1 runner-up) ===
Legend
$25,000 tournaments

| Result | W–L | Date | Tournament | Tier | Surface | Partner | Opponents | Score |
|---|---|---|---|---|---|---|---|---|
| Win | 1–0 | Sep 1998 | ITF Edinburgh, United Kingdom | 25,000 | Clay | (Italy) Antonella Serra Zanetti | (United Kingdom) Louise Latimer (United Kingdom) Helen Reesby | 6–3, 6–3 |
| Loss | 1–1 | Sep 1999 | ITF Spoleto, Italy | 25,000 | Clay | (Argentina) Clarisa Fernández | (Netherlands) Debby Haak (Netherlands) Andrea van den Hurk | 1–6, 1–6 |

== WTA Tour career earnings ==
Schiavone earned more than 11 million dollars during her career.

| Year | Grand Slam titles (Note: Includes singles, doubles and mixed doubles titles.) | WTA titles | Total titles | Earnings ($) | Money list rank |
| 1998 | 0 | 0 | 0 | 7,404 | 371 |
| 1999 | 0 | 0 | 0 | n/a | n/a |
| 2000 | 0 | 0 | 0 | n/a | n/a |
| 2001 | 0 | 1 | 1 | 216,873 | 45 |
| 2002 | 0 | 0 | 0 | 245,088 | 48 |
| 2003 | 0 | 0 | 0 | 392,746 | 29 |
| 2004 | 0 | 1 | 1 | 459,580 | 26 |
| 2005 | 0 | 1 | 1 | 528,587 | 23 |
| 2006 | 0 | 3 | 3 | 730,634 | 16 |
| 2007 | 0 | 1 | 1 | 549,706 | 27 |
| 2008 | 0 | 0 | 0 | 531,915 | 30 |
| 2009 | 0 | 2 | 2 | 831,419 | 18 |
| 2010 | 1 | 1 | 2 | 2,456,634 | 6 |
| 2011 | 0 | 0 | 0 | 1,782,351 | 11 |
| 2012 | 0 | 1 | 1 | 536,613 | 35 |
| 2013 | 0 | 1 | 1 | 500,584 | 50 |
| 2014 | 0 | 0 | 0 | 359,499 | 84 |
| 2015 | 0 | 0 | 0 | 333,980 | 96 |
| 2016 | 0 | 1 | 1 | 253,669 | 115 |
| 2017 | 0 | 1 | 1 | 379,206 | 97 |
| 2018 | 0 | 0 | 0 | 121,084 | 202 |
| Career | 1 | 14 | 15 | 11,324,245 | 51 |

== Record against other players ==
=== No. 1 wins ===
| # | Player | Tournament | Surface | Round | Score | Result |
|---|---|---|---|---|---|---|
| 1. | (France) Amélie Mauresmo | 2006 Fed Cup, France | Clay (i) | 1R | 4–6, 7–6^{(7–4)}, 6–4 | W |
| 2. | (Belgium) Justine Henin | 2008 Dubai Championships, UAE | Hard | QF | 7–6^{(7–4)}, 7–6^{(7–3)} | SF |

=== Top 10 wins ===
| Season | 2001 | 2002 | 2003 | 2004 | 2005 | 2006 | 2007 | 2008 | 2009 | 2010 | 2011 | 2012 | ... | 2015 | Total |
|---|---|---|---|---|---|---|---|---|---|---|---|---|---|---|---|
| Wins | 1 | 1 | 0 | 2 | 4 | 3 | 3 | 4 | 3 | 5 | 2 | 1 | | 1 | 30 |

| # | Player | vsRank | Event | Surface | Round | Score | Rank |
|---|---|---|---|---|---|---|---|
2001
| 1. | (France) Nathalie Tauziat | 10 | Kremlin Cup, Russia | Carpet (i) | 2R | 6–4, 5–7, 6–4 | 40 |
2002
| 2. | (Slovakia) Daniela Hantuchová | 8 | Fed Cup, Spain | Hard (i) | RR | 7–6^{(7–1)}, 6–1 | 41 |
2004
| 3. | (France) Amélie Mauresmo | 3 | Warsaw Open, Poland | Clay | QF | 3–6, 7–6^{(7–1)}, 6–1 | 22 |
| 4. | (Japan) Ai Sugiyama | 10 | Los Angeles Open, United States | Hard | 3R | 6–3, 0–6, 7–6^{(7–3)} | 18 |
2005
| 5. | (United States) Serena Williams | 4 | Italian Open | Clay | 2R | 7–6^{(7–2)}, 6–1 | 26 |
| 6. | (France) Amélie Mauresmo | 4 | Kremlin Cup, Russia | Carpet (i) | 2R | 6–1, 6–1 | 22 |
| 7. | (Russia) Elena Dementieva | 8 | Kremlin Cup, Russia | Carpet (i) | SF | 6–3, 6–1 | 22 |
| 8. | (Russia) Nadia Petrova | 9 | Zurich Open, Switzerland | Hard (i) | 2R | 3–6, 6–2, 7–6^{(7–3)} | 22 |
2006
| 9. | (Russia) Svetlana Kuznetsova | 10 | Amelia Island Championships, USA | Clay (green) | SF | 7–6^{(7–2)}, 3–2, ret. | 11 |
| 10. | (France) Amélie Mauresmo | 1 | Fed Cup, France | Clay (i) | 1R | 4–6, 7–6^{(7–4)}, 6–4 | 11 |
| 11. | (Switzerland) Patty Schnyder | 9 | Luxembourg Open | Hard (i) | QF | 6–1, 6–1 | 14 |
2007
| 12. | (France) Amélie Mauresmo | 6 | Fed Cup, Italy | Clay | SF | 7–5, 6–3 | 31 |
| 13. | (Russia) Elena Dementieva | 10 | Zurich Open, Switzerland | Hard (i) | 1R | 4–6, 6–1, 4–2, ret. | 32 |
| 14. | (Russia) Svetlana Kuznetsova | 2 | Zurich Open, Switzerland | Hard (i) | QF | 6–3, 3–3, ret. | 32 |
2008
| 15. | (France) Marion Bartoli | 10 | Sydney International, Australia | Hard | QF | 2–6, 6–3, 6–2 | 25 |
| 16. | (France) Marion Bartoli | 9 | Dubai Championships, UAE | Hard | 1R | 6–1, 6–7^{(5–7)}, 6–1 | 24 |
| 17. | (Belgium) Justine Henin | 1 | Dubai Championships, UAE | Hard | QF | 7–6^{(7–3)}, 7–6^{(7–4)} | 24 |
| 18. | (Poland) Agnieszka Radwańska | 9 | Summer Olympics, China | Hard | 2R | 6–3, 7–6^{(8–6)} | 26 |
2009
| 19. | (Russia) Svetlana Kuznetsova | 9 | Fed Cup, Italy | Clay | SF | 1–6, 6–2, 6–3 | 44 |
| 20. | (United States) Serena Williams | 2 | Madrid Open, Italy | Clay | 1R | 6–4, ret. | 45 |
| 21. | (Belarus) Victoria Azarenka | 9 | US Open | Hard | 3R | 4–6, 6–2, 6–2 | 27 |
2010
| 22. | (Poland) Agnieszka Radwańska | 10 | Australian Open | Hard | 3R | 6–2, 6–2 | 18 |
| 23. | (Denmark) Caroline Wozniacki | 3 | French Open | Clay | QF | 6–2, 6–2 | 17 |
| 24. | (Russia) Elena Dementieva | 5 | French Open | Clay | SF | 7–6^{(7–3)}, ret. | 17 |
| 25. | (Australia) Samantha Stosur | 7 | French Open | Clay | F | 6–4, 7–6^{(7–2)} | 17 |
| 26. | (Russia) Elena Dementieva | 9 | WTA Tour Championships, Qatar | Hard | RR | 6–4, 6–2 | 6 |
2011
| 27. | (Australia) Samantha Stosur | 5 | Fed Cup, Australia | Hard | 1R | 7–6^{(7–1)}, 3–6, 7–5 | 4 |
| 28. | (Serbia) Jelena Janković | 10 | French Open | Clay | 4R | 6–3, 2–6, 6–4 | 5 |
2012
| 29. | (Australia) Samantha Stosur | 6 | Sydney International, Australia | Hard | 1R | 6–2, 6–4 | 11 |
2015
| 30. | (Germany) Angelique Kerber | 10 | Diamond Games, Belgium | Hard (i) | 2R | 6–1, 6–1 | 81 |
