= 2006 WTA Tour Championships =

- Date: 7–12 November
- Edition: 36th
- Category: Year-end championships
- Draw: 8S (round robin) / 4D
- Prize money: $3,000,000
- Surface: Hard/indoor
- Location: Madrid, Spain
- Venue: Madrid Arena

Champions

Singles
- (Belgium) Justine Henin-Hardenne

Doubles
- (United States) Lisa Raymond / (Australia) Samantha Stosur
← 2005 ·	WTA Finals	· 2007 →

The 2006 WTA Tour Championships, also known as the Sony Ericsson Championships, was a women's round robin tennis tournament played on indoor hard courts at the Madrid Arena in Madrid, Spain. It was the 36th edition of the year-end singles championships, the 31st edition of the year-end doubles championships, and was part of the 2006 WTA Tour. The tournament was held between 7 November and 12 November 2006. Fourth-seeded Justine Henin-Hardenne won the singles event and earned $1,000,000 first-prize money as well as 525 ranking points. With her victory Henin-Hardenne secured her year-end No.1 ranking.

== Finals ==
=== Singles ===
(Belgium) Justine Henin-Hardenne defeated (France) Amélie Mauresmo, 6–4, 6–3.

=== Doubles ===
(United States) Lisa Raymond / (Australia) Samantha Stosur defeated (Zimbabwe) Cara Black / (Australia) Rennae Stubbs, 3–6, 6–3, 6–3.

== Singles Championship Race ==
=== Singles ===
Players in gold have qualified for Madrid. Players in brown withdrawn. The low-ranked players in blue after them would be played as alternates in Madrid.

Rank	Player	Mandatory Events					Best Other Tournaments												Total points	Tourn
Rank	Player	AUS	FRA	WIM	USO	MIA	1	2	3	4	5	6	7	8	9	10	11	12	Total points	Tourn
1	(Belgium) Justine Henin-Hardenne	F 492	W 700	F 492	F 492	R64; 1	W 220	F 210	W 195	W 195	W 195	SF; 146	SF; 135						3,473	12
2	(Russia) Maria Sharapova	SF; 314	R16; 96	SF; 314	W 700	F 246	W 325	W 300	W 300	W 195	F 154	SF; 135	SF; 88	QF; 75	SF; 55				3,297	14
3	(France) Amélie Mauresmo	W 700	R16; 96	W 700	SF; 314	SF; 157	W 195	W 195	F 137	F 137	SF; 135	QF; 75	QF; 75	QF; 55	QF; 49	R16; 1	R16; 1		3,022	16
4	(Russia) Svetlana Kuznetsova	R16; 96	F 492	R32; 62	R16; 96	W 350	W 195	W 145	F 137	SF; 135	SF; 135	SF; 99	SF; 99	SF; 88	SF; 88	SF; 88	SF; 88	QF; 75	2,668	21
4	(Russia) Svetlana Kuznetsova						QF; 75	QF; 75	QF; 49	R16; 1									2,668	21
5	(Russia) Nadia Petrova	QF; 174	R128; 2	A 0	R32; 62	QF; 87	W 300	W 300	W 220	F 210	W 195	W 195	F 137	SF; 88	QF; 49	QF; 49	QF; 49	SF; 43	2,166	22
5	(Russia) Nadia Petrova						R32; 1	R32; 1	R32; 1	R32; 1	R16; 1	R16; 1							2,166	22
6	(Belgium) Kim Clijsters	SF; 314	SF; 314	SF; 314	A 0	R64; 1	F 210	W 195	W 195	F 137	W 120	SF; 88	QF; 49	R16; 42	R32; 1				1,980	13
7	(Russia) Elena Dementieva	R128; 2	R32; 62	QF; 174	QF; 174	R16; 48	W 300	F 228	W 195	SF; 135	SF; 88	SF; 88	QF; 75	QF; 75	SF; 55	QF; 55	QF; 49	QF; 49	1,944	20
7	(Russia) Elena Dementieva						QF; 49	R16; 42	R16; 1										1,944	20
8	(Switzerland) Martina Hingis	QF; 174	QF; 174	R32; 62	R64; 38	R32; 31	W 300	F 210	F 210	SF; 146	W 120	SF; 88	QF; 75	QF; 75	QF; 75	SF; 55	QF; 55	R16; 25	1,926	19
8	(Switzerland) Martina Hingis						R16; 12	R32; 1											1,926	19
9	(Switzerland) Patty Schnyder	QF; 174	R16; 96	R64; 38	R16; 96	R16; 48	F 210	F 137	SF; 135	SF; 99	SF; 88	SF; 88	QF; 75	QF; 75	SF; 66	SF; 55	QF; 49	QF; 49	1,704	25
9	(Switzerland) Patty Schnyder						QF; 49	R16; 42	QF; 30	R16; 1	R16; 1	R16; 1	R32; 1	R32; 1					1,704	25
10	(Russia) Dinara Safina	R64; 38	QF; 174	R32; 62	QF; 174	R64; 1	F 210	SF; 135	F 85	QF; 81	QF; 75	QF; 75	SF; 55	QF; 49	QF; 49	QF; 49	QF; 49	R16; 29	1,442	21
10	(Russia) Dinara Safina						R16; 25	R16; 25	R64; 1	R32; 1									1,442	21
11	(Czech Republic) Nicole Vaidišová	R16; 96	SF; 314	R16; 96	R32; 62	A 0	SF; 135	SF; 135	W 120	SF; 88	SF; 88	SF; 88	QF; 75	R16; 42	R16; 25	R32; 25	R32; 1	R32; 1	1,393	18
11	(Czech Republic) Nicole Vaidišová						R32; 1	R16; 1											1,393	18
