= 2012 Internationaux de Strasbourg =

- Date: 19–26 May
- Edition: 26th
- Category: WTA International
- Draw: 32S / 15D
- Prize money: $220,000
- Surface: Clay
- Location: Strasbourg, France
- Venue: Tennis Club de Strasbourg

Champions

Singles
- (Italy) Francesca Schiavone

Doubles
- (Belarus) Olga Govortsova / (Poland) Klaudia Jans-Ignacik
- Internationaux de Strasbourg

The 2012 Internationaux de Strasbourg was a professional tennis tournament played on clay courts. It was the 26th edition of the tournament which was part of the 2012 WTA Tour. It took place in Strasbourg, France between 19 May and 26 May 2012. Second-seeded Francesca Schiavone won the singles title.

== Finals ==
=== Singles ===
(Italy) Francesca Schiavone defeated (France) Alizé Cornet, 6–4, 6–4

- It was Schiavone's 1st singles title of the year and the 5th of her career

=== Doubles ===
(Belarus) Olga Govortsova / (Poland) Klaudia Jans-Ignacik defeated (South Africa) Natalie Grandin / (Czech Republic) Vladimíra Uhlířová, 6–7^{(4–7)}, 6–3, [10–3]

== Singles main draw entrants ==
=== Seeds ===
Country	Player	Rank^{1}	Seed
GER	Sabine Lisicki	13	1
ITA	Francesca Schiavone	14	2
RUS	Maria Kirilenko	16	3
ESP	Anabel Medina Garrigues	31	4
GER	Mona Barthel	32	5
NZL	Marina Erakovic	40	6
~~CZE~~	~~Klára Zakopalová~~	~~42~~	~~7~~
AUT	Tamira Paszek	52	8
CAN	Aleksandra Wozniak	53	9

- Rankings are as of 14 May 2012

=== Other entrants ===
The following players received wildcards into the singles main draw:

- (France) Alizé Cornet
- (Germany) Sabine Lisicki
- (France) Virginie Razzano

The following players received entry from the qualifying draw:

- (United States) Lauren Davis
- (Croatia) Mirjana Lučić
- (Russia) Alexandra Panova
- (Latvia) Anastasija Sevastova

The following players received entry as lucky losers:

- (Spain) María José Martínez Sánchez
- (Luxembourg) Mandy Minella

=== Withdrawals ===
- (Italy) Flavia Pennetta (wrist injury)
- (Czech Republic) Klára Zakopalová (sickness)
- (Russia) Elena Vesnina (right wrist injury)

=== Retirements ===
- (Russia) Maria Kirilenko (right ankle injury)
- (Latvia) Anastasija Sevastova (low back injury)

== Doubles main draw entrants ==
=== Seeds ===
Country	Player	Country	Player	Rank^{1}	Seed
RSA	Natalie Grandin	CZE	Vladimíra Uhlířová	43	1
BLR	Olga Govortsova	POL	Klaudia Jans-Ignacik	106	2
LUX	Mandy Minella	FRA	Pauline Parmentier	171	3
HUN	Tímea Babos	TPE	Hsieh Su-wei	172	4

- ^{1} Rankings are as of 14 May 2012

=== Retirements ===
- (Italy) Alberta Brianti (left calf injury)
