= 2006 Dubai Tennis Championships =

- Date: February 20 – March 4
- Edition: 14th
- Surface: Hard / Outdoor
- Location: Dubai, United Arab Emirates

Champions

Men's singles
- (Spain) Rafael Nadal

Women's singles
- (Belgium) Justine Henin-Hardenne

Men's doubles
- (Australia) Paul Hanley / (Zimbabwe) Kevin Ullyett

Women's doubles
- (Czech Republic) Květa Peschke / (Italy) Francesca Schiavone
- Dubai Tennis Championships

The 2006 Dubai Duty Free Men's Championships and Dubai Duty Free Women's Championships was the 14th edition of this tennis tournament and was played on outdoor hard courts. The tournament was part of the International Series Gold of the 2006 ATP Tour and the Tier II series of the 2006 WTA Tour. It took place in Dubai, United Arab Emirates from February 20 through March 4, 2006.

== Finals ==
=== Men's singles ===
(Spain) Rafael Nadal defeated (Switzerland) Roger Federer, 2–6, 6–4, 6–4

=== Women's singles ===
(Belgium) Justine Henin-Hardenne defeated (Russia) Maria Sharapova, 7–5, 6–2

=== Men's doubles ===
(Australia) Paul Hanley / (Zimbabwe) Kevin Ullyett defeated (The Bahamas) Mark Knowles / (Canada) Daniel Nestor, 1–6, 6–2, [10–1]

=== Women's doubles ===
(Czech Republic) Květa Peschke / (Italy) Francesca Schiavone defeated (Russia) Svetlana Kuznetsova / (Russia) Nadia Petrova, 3–6, 7–6, 6–3
