= 2006 Italian Open – Men's singles =

Men's singles
- 2006 Italian Open

Final
- Champion: (Spain) Rafael Nadal
- Runner-up: (Switzerland) Roger Federer
- Score: 6–7^{(0–7)}, 7–6^{(7–5)}, 6–4, 2–6, 7–6^{(7–5)}

Details
- Draw: 64 (8Q / 4WC)
- Seeds: 16

Events
Singles	men	women
Doubles	men	women
← 2005 ·	Italian Open	· 2007 →

Defending champion Rafael Nadal defeated Roger Federer in the final, 6–7^{(0–7)}, 7–6^{(7–5)}, 6–4, 2–6, 7–6^{(7–5)} to win the men's singles tennis title at the 2006 Italian Open.

== The final ==
Rafael Nadal recovered from the brink of defeat against Roger Federer to capture the Rome Masters and equal the record for consecutive wins on clay. Nadal came back from 1–4 down and saved two match points in the final set before triumphing 6–7^{(0–7)}, 7–6^{(7–5)}, 6–4, 2–6, 7–6^{(7–5)}.

The win, which took over five hours, took Nadal to 53 straight wins on clay, matching Guillermo Vilas' record. It also put the 19-year-old level with Björn Borg on 16 titles won as a teenager.

Federer, who had beaten Nadal only once in five attempts before the Rome Masters, started well, clinching a high-quality first set after playing a near-perfect tiebreak. And the world number one was on top for most of the second set but Nadal's trademark battling qualities kept him in it and out of the blue, he somehow earned a set point at 5–4. The teenager was unable to take that one but edged another tiebreak to draw level.

The momentum was by now with Nadal and he looked to have made a decisive move when a break at 2–2 gave him the third set. He had chances to break early in the fourth set but the Spaniard let his struggling opponent off the hook and Federer made him pay. The top seed raced through the fourth set and took control of the decider by taking a 4–1 lead. The Rome crowd, including Prince Albert of Monaco and Omar Sharif, looked on in disbelief as first Nadal levelled at 4–4 then fought off Federer again at 5–6. Nadal's double fault, the first of the match from either player, helped Federer earn two match points but the world number one's usually reliable forehand failed him on both occasions and the Spaniard survived.

Federer still had chances to win in the tiebreak which he led 5–3, in particular when he mishit a forehand which would have given him a 6–3 lead. However, Nadal underlined his talent on the dirt by clinching the tiebreaker and wrapping up his fifth win in six attempts over Federer.

== Seeds ==
A champion seed is indicated in bold text while text in italics indicates the round in which that seed was eliminated.

1. (Switzerland) Roger Federer (final)
2. (Spain) **Rafael Nadal (champion)**
3. (Croatia) Ivan Ljubičić (first round)
4. (Argentina) David Nalbandian (semifinals)
5. (United States) Andy Roddick (quarterfinals)
6. (Russia) Nikolay Davydenko (third round)
7. (United States) James Blake (first round)
8. (Argentina) Gastón Gaudio (first round)
9. (Argentina) Guillermo Coria (first round)
10. (Chile) Fernando González (quarterfinals)
11. (Spain) David Ferrer (first round)
12. (Spain) Tommy Robredo (first round)
13. (Germany) Nicolas Kiefer (second round)
14. (Czech Republic) Radek Štěpánek (third round)
15. (Sweden) Thomas Johansson (second round)
16. (United States) Robby Ginepri (second round)

== Draw ==
=== Key ===
- Q = Qualifier
- WC = Wild card
- LL = Lucky loser
- Alt = Alternate
- SE = Special exempt
- PR = Protected ranking
- ITF = ITF entry
- JE = Junior exempt
- w/o = Walkover
- r = Retired
- d = Defaulted
- SR = Special ranking

=== Finals ===
Semifinals
1	(Switzerland) **Roger Federer**	**6**	3	**7^{7}**
4	(Argentina) David Nalbandian	3	**6**	6^{5}
(France) Gaël Monfils	2	2
2	(Spain) **Rafael Nadal**	**6**	**6**

Final
1	(Switzerland) Roger Federer	**7^{7}**	6^{5}	4	**6**	6^{5}
2	(Spain) **Rafael Nadal**	6^{0}	**7^{7}**	**6**	2	**7^{7}**

=== Top half ===
==== Section 1 ====
First round
1	(Switzerland) **R Federer**	**6**	**6**
(Argentina) J I Chela	2	1
WC	(Italy) **P Starace**	**6**	**6**
(Russia) D Tursunov	4	1
(Finland) **J Nieminen**	**6**	**6**
(France) S Grosjean	2	1
(Spain) F López	4	4
14	(Czech Republic) **R Štěpánek**	**6**	**6**
11	(Spain) D Ferrer	5	0
(Argentina) **J Acasuso**	**7**	**6**
Q	(Spain) **N Almagro**	**7**	**6**
(Chile) N Massú	5	4
(Spain) **F Verdasco**	**6**	2	**6**
WC	(Italy) S Bolelli	4	**6**	1
(Serbia and Montenegro) B Pašanski	1	4
6	(Russia) **N Davydenko**	**6**	**6**

Second round
1	(Switzerland) **R Federer**	**6**	**7^{7}**
WC	(Italy) P Starace	3	6^{2}
(Finland) J Nieminen	4	6^{5}
14	(Czech Republic) **R Štěpánek**	**6**	**7^{7}**
(Argentina) J Acasuso	4	**6**	4
Q	(Spain) **N Almagro**	**6**	2	**6**
(Spain) F Verdasco	1	**6**	0
6	(Russia) **N Davydenko**	**6**	3	**6**

Third round
1	(Switzerland) **R Federer**	**6**	**6**
14	(Czech Republic) R Štěpánek	1	4
Q	(Spain) **N Almagro**	**7^{8}**
6	(Russia) N Davydenko	6^{6}	r

Quarterfinals
1	(Switzerland) **R Federer**	**6**	6^{2}	**7**
Q	(Spain) N Almagro	3	**7^{7}**	5

==== Section 2 ====
First round
4	(Argentina) **D Nalbandian**	**6**	3	**6**
Q	(Spain) F Vicente	2	**6**	3
(France) **P-H Mathieu**	**6**	**6**
(Spain) J C Ferrero	1	3
Q	(Spain) **A Martín**	**6**	**6**
(Italy) D Sanguinetti	2	4
WC	(Italy) D Bracciali	**6**	2	4
13	(Germany) **N Kiefer**	4	**6**	**6**
9	(Argentina) G Coria	3	2
Q	(Spain) **R Ramírez Hidalgo**	**6**	**6**
(Russia) **M Safin**	**7**	3	**6**
Q	(Russia) T Gabashvili	5	**6**	1
(Croatia) **M Ančić**	**6**	**6**
(Peru) L Horna	4	4
(France) **F Serra**	**6**	**7^{7}**
7	(United States) J Blake	4	6^{3}

Second round
4	(Argentina) **D Nalbandian**	**6**	**6**
(France) P-H Mathieu	2	4
Q	(Spain) **A Martín**	**6**	**7^{7}**
13	(Germany) N Kiefer	3	6^{3}
Q	(Spain) **R Ramírez Hidalgo**	0	**7^{8}**	**7^{7}**
(Russia) M Safin	**6**	6^{6}	6^{3}
(Croatia) **M Ančić**	3	**7^{12}**	**6**
(France) F Serra	**6**	6^{10}	0

Third round
4	(Argentina) **D Nalbandian**	**7**	**6**
Q	(Spain) A Martín	5	4
Q	(Spain) R Ramírez Hidalgo	3	**7^{7}**	5
(Croatia) **M Ančić**	**6**	6^{4}	**7**

Quarterfinals
4	(Argentina) **D Nalbandian**	**6**	**6**
(Croatia) M Ančić	3	3

=== Bottom half ===
==== Section 3 ====
First round
5	(United States) **A Roddick**	**6**	**6**
(Romania) V Hănescu	1	0
(Cyprus) **M Baghdatis**	**7**	**6**
(Belgium) O Rochus	5	4
Q	(Italy) **S Galvani**	**6**	**6**
(Czech Republic) J Novák	3	4
(United Kingdom) **G Rusedski**	5	**6**	**6**
12	(Spain) T Robredo	**7**	3	4
16	(United States) **R Ginepri**	3	**6**	**6**
(Belarus) M Mirnyi	**6**	2	3
(France) **G Monfils**	**6**	3	**6**
(Germany) T Haas	2	**6**	4
Q	(Argentina) J Mónaco	**6**	2	3
(France) **F Santoro**	4	**6**	**6**
(Slovakia) **D Hrbatý**	5	**7^{7}**	**6**
3	(Croatia) I Ljubičić	**7**	6^{4}	4

Second round
5	(United States) **A Roddick**	3	**6**	**6**
(Cyprus) M Baghdatis	**6**	1	2
Q	(Italy) S Galvani	6^{4}	4
(United Kingdom) **G Rusedski**	**7^{7}**	**6**
16	(United States) R Ginepri	1	**6**	4
(France) **G Monfils**	**6**	4	**6**
(France) **F Santoro**	**7^{7}**	**6**
(Slovakia) D Hrbatý	6^{2}	3

Third round
5	(United States) **A Roddick**	**7^{7}**	**6**
(United Kingdom) G Rusedski	6^{4}	2
(France) **G Monfils**	**7^{9}**	**6**
(France) F Santoro	6^{7}	2

Quarterfinals
5	(United States) A Roddick	2	3
(France) **G Monfils**	**6**	**6**

==== Section 4 ====
First round
8	(Argentina) G Gaudio	**6**	3	3
(Belgium) **X Malisse**	4	**6**	**6**
(Thailand) P Srichaphan	1	3
(Czech Republic) **T Berdych**	**6**	**6**
(Russia) **M Youzhny**	**6**	**7^{9}**
(Italy) A Seppi	2	6^{7}
(Switzerland) S Wawrinka	4	4
10	(Chile) **F González**	**6**	**6**
15	(Sweden) **T Johansson**	**7^{7}**	**6**
Q	(Italy) F Fognini	6^{3}	3
(United Kingdom) **T Henman**	**7**	**7^{7}**
WC	(Italy) A di Mauro	5	6^{2}
(United Kingdom) A Murray	4	4
(Italy) **F Volandri**	**6**	**6**
(Spain) C Moyà	1	**6**	2
2	(Spain) **R Nadal**	**6**	2	**6**

Second round
(Belgium) X Malisse	2	1
(Czech Republic) **T Berdych**	**6**	**6**
(Russia) M Youzhny	4	**7**	3
10	(Chile) **F González**	**6**	5	**6**
15	(Sweden) T Johansson	6^{8}	1
(United Kingdom) **T Henman**	**7^{10}**	**6**
(Italy) F Volandri	1	2
2	(Spain) **R Nadal**	**6**	**6**

Third round
(Czech Republic) T Berdych	2	4
10	(Chile) **F González**	**6**	**6**
(United Kingdom) T Henman	2	2
2	(Spain) **R Nadal**	**6**	**6**

Quarterfinals
10	(Chile) F González	4	3
2	(Spain) **R Nadal**	**6**	**6**

== Qualifying ==
=== Seeds ===
1. (Spain) **Nicolás Almagro (qualified)**
2. (Spain) **Alberto Martín (qualified)**
3. (Serbia and Montenegro) Novak Djokovic (qualifying competition)
4. (Sweden) Jonas Björkman (first round)
5. (South Africa) Wesley Moodie (first round)
6. (United States) Vincent Spadea (first round)
7. (Spain) **Fernando Vicente (qualified)**
8. (Brazil) Flávio Saretta (qualifying competition)
9. (Spain) **Rubén Ramírez Hidalgo (qualified)**
10. (Romania) Răzvan Sabău (first round)
11. (Belgium) Dick Norman (qualifying competition)
12. (Russia) Igor Kunitsyn (qualifying competition)
13. (Argentina) **Juan Mónaco (qualified)**
14. (Austria) Oliver Marach (qualifying competition)
15. (Spain) Guillermo García-López (first round)
16. (Costa Rica) Juan Antonio Marín (qualifying competition)

=== Qualifiers ===
1. **(Spain) Nicolás Almagro**
2. **(Spain) Alberto Martín**
3. **(Italy) Fabio Fognini**
4. **(Italy) Stefano Galvani**
5. **(Russia) Teymuraz Gabashvili**
6. **(Argentina) Juan Mónaco**
7. **(Spain) Fernando Vicente**
8. **(Spain) Rubén Ramírez Hidalgo**

=== Qualifying draw ===
==== First qualifier ====
First round
1	**(Spain) Nicolás Almagro**	**6**	**6**
(Italy) Flavio Cipolla	2	3
**(Switzerland) George Bastl**	**6**	**6**
15	(Spain) Guillermo García-López	2	0

Qualifying competition
1	**(Spain) Nicolás Almagro**	**6**	**6**
(Switzerland) George Bastl	0	4

==== Second qualifier ====
First round
2	**(Spain) Alberto Martín**	**6**	**6**
WC	(Italy) Thomas Fabbiano	1	2
(Belgium) Gilles Elseneer	3	4
12	**(Russia) Igor Kunitsyn**	**6**	**6**

Qualifying competition
2	**(Spain) Alberto Martín**	**6**	**6**
12	(Russia) Igor Kunitsyn	3	4

==== Third qualifier ====
First round
3	**(Serbia and Montenegro) Novak Djokovic**	**6**	**6**
(Italy) Francesco Aldi	2	3
WC	**(Italy) Fabio Fognini**	**6**	**6**
10	(Romania) Răzvan Sabău	2	4

Qualifying competition
3	(Serbia and Montenegro) Novak Djokovic	6^{4}	**6**	3
WC	**(Italy) Fabio Fognini**	**7^{7}**	1	**6**

==== Fourth qualifier ====
First round
4	(Sweden) Jonas Björkman	4	4
WC	**(Italy) Stefano Galvani**	**6**	**6**
(Russia) Evgeny Korolev	1	4
16	**(Costa Rica) Juan Antonio Marín**	**6**	**6**

Qualifying competition
WC	**(Italy) Stefano Galvani**	**6**	1	**6**
16	(Costa Rica) Juan Antonio Marín	2	**6**	1

==== Fifth qualifier ====
First round
5	(South Africa) Wesley Moodie	**7**	5	2
**(Russia) Teymuraz Gabashvili**	5	**7**	**6**
(Colombia) Alejandro Falla	1	2
11	**(Belgium) Dick Norman**	**6**	**6**

Qualifying competition
**(Russia) Teymuraz Gabashvili**	**6**	4	**6**
11	(Belgium) Dick Norman	3	**6**	1

==== Sixth qualifier ====
First round
6	(United States) Vincent Spadea	1	5
**(Italy) Giorgio Galimberti**	**6**	**7**
(Italy) Federico Luzzi	2	2
13	**(Argentina) Juan Mónaco**	**6**	**6**

Qualifying competition
(Italy) Giorgio Galimberti	3	2
13	**(Argentina) Juan Mónaco**	**6**	**6**

==== Seventh qualifier ====
First round
7	**(Spain) Fernando Vicente**	**6**	**6**
(Germany) Lars Burgsmüller	4	1
(France) Antony Dupuis	6^{6}	3
14	**(Austria) Oliver Marach**	**7^{8}**	**6**

Qualifying competition
7	**(Spain) Fernando Vicente**	**6**	**6**
14	(Austria) Oliver Marach	3	3

==== Eighth qualifier ====
First round
8	**(Brazil) Flávio Saretta**	**6**	**6**
(Ecuador) Nicolás Lapentti	4	2
WC	(Italy) Gianluca Naso	4	3
9	**(Spain) Rubén Ramírez Hidalgo**	**6**	**6**

Qualifying competition
8	(Brazil) Flávio Saretta	4	**6**	3
9	**(Spain) Rubén Ramírez Hidalgo**	**6**	4	**6**
