= 2006 Fortis Championships Luxembourg =

- Date: 25 September – 1 October
- Edition: 11th
- Category: Tier II
- Prize money: $600,000
- Surface: Hard / indoor
- Location: Kockelscheuer, Luxembourg

Champions

Singles
- (Ukraine) Alona Bondarenko

Doubles
- (Czech Republic) Květa Peschke / (Italy) Francesca Schiavone
← 2005 ·	Luxembourg Open	· 2007 →

The 2006 Fortis Championships Luxembourg was a women's tennis tournament played on indoor hard courts. It was the 11th edition of the Fortis Championships Luxembourg, and was part of the Tier II Series of the 2006 WTA Tour. It was held in Kockelscheuer, Luxembourg.

== Finals ==
=== Singles ===
(Ukraine) Alona Bondarenko defeated (Italy) Francesca Schiavone, 6–3, 6–2

- It was the 1st singles title for Bondarenko in her singles career.

=== Doubles ===
(Czech Republic) Květa Peschke / (Italy) Francesca Schiavone defeated (Germany) Anna-Lena Grönefeld / (South Africa) Liezel Huber, 2–6, 6–4, 6–1

- It was the 7th title for Peschke and the 5th title for Schiavone in their respective doubles careers.

== Points and prize money ==
=== Point distribution ===
Event	W	F	SF	QF	Round of 16	Round of 32	Q	Q3	Q2	Q1
Singles	195	137	88	49	25	1	11.75	6.75	4	1
Doubles	195	137	88	49	1	—	11.75	—	—	—

=== Prize money ===
Event	W	F	SF	QF	Round of 16	Round of 32	Q3	Q2	Q1
Singles	$95,500	$51,000	$27,300	$14,600	$7,820	$4,175	$2,230	$1,195	$640
Doubles *	$30,000	$16,120	$8,620	$4,610	$2,465	—	—	—	—

_{* per team}

== Singles main-draw entrants ==
=== Seeds ===
Country	Player	Rank^{1}	Seed
RUS	Elena Dementieva	6	1
RUS	Nadia Petrova	7	2
SUI	Patty Schnyder	8	3
RUS	Dinara Safina	11	4
ITA	Francesca Schiavone	14	5
SCG	Ana Ivanovic	15	6
GER	Anna-Lena Grönefeld	16	7
FRA	Mary Pierce	18	8

^{1} Rankings as of 18 September 2006.

=== Other entrants ===
The following players received wildcards into the singles main draw:

- (Russia) Elena Dementieva
- (Luxembourg) Anne Kremer
- (United States) Chanda Rubin

The following players received entry from the qualifying draw:

- (Italy) Karin Knapp
- (Germany) Tatjana Malek
- (Poland) Agnieszka Radwańska
- (Italy) Roberta Vinci

== Doubles main-draw entrants ==
=== Seeds ===
Country	Player	Country	Player	Rank^{1}	Seed
USA	Lisa Raymond	AUS	Samantha Stosur	2	1
RUS	Dinara Safina	SLO	Katarina Srebotnik	21	2
CZE	Květa Peschke	ITA	Francesca Schiavone	25	3
GER	Anna-Lena Grönefeld	RSA	Liezel Huber	34	4

^{1} Rankings as of 18 September 2006.

=== Other entrants ===
The following pair received wildcards into the doubles main draw:

- (Belgium) Kirsten Flipkens / (Belgium) Yanina Wickmayer

The following pair received entry from the qualifying draw:

- (Germany) Kristina Barrois / (Poland) Agnieszka Radwańska
