= 2012 Internationaux de Strasbourg – Doubles =

Doubles
- 2012 Internationaux de Strasbourg

Final
- Champions: (Belarus) Olga Govortsova (Poland) Klaudia Jans-Ignacik
- Runners-up: (South Africa) Natalie Grandin (Czech Republic) Vladimíra Uhlířová
- Score: 6–7^{(4–7)}, 6–3, [10–3]

Details
- Draw: 15
- Seeds: 4

Events
Singles	Doubles
- Internationaux de Strasbourg

Akgul Amanmuradova and Chuang Chia-jung were the defending champions but Amanmuradova decided not to participate.
Chuang played alongside Chang Kai-chen, but they lost in the quarterfinals to Natalie Grandin and Vladimíra Uhlířová.
Olga Govortsova and Klaudia Jans-Ignacik won the tournament defeating Natalie Grandin and Vladimíra Uhlířová 6–7^{(4–7)}, 6–3, [10–3] in the final.

== Seeds ==
1. (South Africa) Natalie Grandin / (Czech Republic) Vladimíra Uhlířová (final)
2. (Belarus) Olga Govortsova / (Poland) Klaudia Jans-Ignacik (champions)
3. (Luxembourg) Mandy Minella / (France) Pauline Parmentier (first round)
4. (Hungary) Tímea Babos / (Chinese Taipei) Hsieh Su-wei (semifinals)

== Draw ==
Key

- Q = Qualifier
- WC = Wild card
- LL = Lucky loser
- Alt = Alternate
- ITF = ITF entry
- PR = Protected ranking
- SR = Special ranking
- SE = Special exempt
- JE = Junior exempt
- JR = Junior Accelerator Programme entrant
- CO = College Accelerator Programme entrant
- NG = Next Gen Accelerator Program entrant
- w/o = Walkover
- r = Retired
- d = Defaulted

=== Draw ===
First round
(Chinese Taipei) K-c Chang (Chinese Taipei) C-j Chuang	6	7^{7}
(Croatia) A Vrljić (Germany) K Wörle	3	6^{3}
4	(Hungary) T Babos (Chinese Taipei) S-w Hsieh	6	6
(Switzerland) C Perrin (Russia) M Shamayko	1	0
(Bulgaria) A Naydenova (Brazil) T Pereira	6	6
(United States) S Stephens (Germany) J Wöhr	2	1
(Slovakia) L Juríková (Slovakia) K Kučová	6	4	[8]
(Australia) M Adamczak (Australia) S Bengson	1	6	[10]
(Romania) A Cadanțu (United Kingdom) A Keothavong	6	2	[10]
3	(Luxembourg) M Minella (France) P Parmentier	4	6	[5]
(Italy) A Brianti (France) S Foretz Gacon
(Venezuela) A Gámiz (Mexico) X Hermoso	w/o
(Japan) S Aoyama (Chinese Taipei) H-c Chan	6^{3}	2
2	(Belarus) O Govortsova (Poland) K Jans-Ignacik	7^{7}	6

Quarterfinals
1	(South Africa) N Grandin (Czech Republic) V Uhlířová	7	6
(Chinese Taipei) K-c Chang (Chinese Taipei) C-j Chuang	5	4
4	(Hungary) T Babos (Chinese Taipei) S-w Hsieh	6	6
(Bulgaria) A Naydenova (Brazil) T Pereira	3	4
(Australia) M Adamczak (Australia) S Bengson	3	3
(Romania) A Cadanțu (United Kingdom) A Keothavong	6	6
(Venezuela) A Gámiz (Mexico) X Hermoso	2	5
2	(Belarus) O Govortsova (Poland) K Jans-Ignacik	6	7

Semifinals
1	(South Africa) N Grandin (Czech Republic) V Uhlířová	0	6	[12]
4	(Hungary) T Babos (Chinese Taipei) S-w Hsieh	6	2	[10]
(Romania) A Cadanțu (United Kingdom) A Keothavong	2	1
2	(Belarus) O Govortsova (Poland) K Jans-Ignacik	6	6

Final
1	(South Africa) N Grandin (Czech Republic) V Uhlířová	7^{7}	3	[3]
2	(Belarus) O Govortsova (Poland) K Jans-Ignacik	6^{4}	6	[10]
