= 2006 Dubai Tennis Championships – Men's doubles =

Men's doubles
- 2006 Dubai Tennis Championships

Final
- Champion: (Australia) Paul Hanley (Zimbabwe) Kevin Ullyett
- Runner-up: (The Bahamas) Mark Knowles (Canada) Daniel Nestor
- Score: 1–6, 6–2, [10–1]

Details
- Draw: 16
- Seeds: 4

Events
Singles	men	women
Doubles	men	women
- Dubai Tennis Championships

Martin Damm and Radek Štěpánek were the defending champions. Damm partnered with Leander Paes, losing in the semifinals. Štěpánek partnered with Tomáš Berdych, losing in the quarterfinals.

Paul Hanley and Kevin Ullyett won in the final 1–6, 6–2, [10–1], against Mark Knowles and Daniel Nestor.

== Seeds ==
1. (The Bahamas) Mark Knowles / (Canada) Daniel Nestor (final)
2. (Australia) Paul Hanley / (Zimbabwe) Kevin Ullyett (champions)
3. (France) Fabrice Santoro / (Serbia and Montenegro) Nenad Zimonjić (semifinals)
4. (Czech Republic) Martin Damm / (India) Leander Paes (semifinals)

== Draw ==
Key

- Q = Qualifier
- WC = Wild card
- LL = Lucky loser
- Alt = Alternate
- ITF = ITF entry
- PR = Protected ranking
- SR = Special ranking
- SE = Special exempt
- JE = Junior exempt
- JR = Junior Accelerator Programme entrant
- CO = College Accelerator Programme entrant
- NG = Next Gen Accelerator Program entrant
- w/o = Walkover
- r = Retired
- d = Defaulted

=== Draw ===
First round
1	(The Bahamas) M Knowles (Canada) D Nestor	1	7^{7}	[10]
(Switzerland) Y Allegro (Switzerland) R Federer	6	6^{4}	[6]
(Czech Republic) P Pála (Czech Republic) C Suk	3	7	[10]
(Germany) R Schüttler (Russia) M Youzhny	6	6^{5}	[4]
3	(France) F Santoro (Serbia and Montenegro) N Zimonjić	6	6
Alt	(Germany) B Phau (Germany) L Uebel	2	3
WC	(Kuwait) M al Ghareeb (United Arab Emirates) O Bahrouzyan	4	2
(Czech Republic) T Berdych (Czech Republic) R Štěpánek	6	6
(Czech Republic) R Vik (Switzerland) S Wawrinka	4	6	[10]
(Belgium) C Rochus (Belgium) O Rochus	6	4	[12]
(Russia) I Andreev (Russia) N Davydenko	6^{4}	3
4	(Czech Republic) M Damm (India) L Paes	7^{7}	6
(Spain) D Ferrer (Italy) A Seppi	3	5
(Spain) F López (Spain) R Nadal	6	7
(India) M Bhupathi (South Africa) W Moodie	6^{3}	2
2	(Australia) P Hanley (Zimbabwe) K Ullyett	7^{7}	6

Quarterfinals
1	(The Bahamas) M Knowles (Canada) D Nestor	6	6
(Czech Republic) P Pála (Czech Republic) C Suk	4	0
3	(France) F Santoro (Serbia and Montenegro) N Zimonjić	6	6
(Czech Republic) T Berdych (Czech Republic) R Štěpánek	3	4
(Belgium) C Rochus (Belgium) O Rochus	2	6^{4}
4	(Czech Republic) M Damm (India) L Paes	6	7^{7}
(Spain) F López (Spain) R Nadal
2	(Australia) P Hanley (Zimbabwe) K Ullyett	w/o

Semifinals
1	(The Bahamas) M Knowles (Canada) D Nestor	6^{5}	6	[10]
3	(France) F Santoro (Serbia and Montenegro) N Zimonjić	7^{7}	4	[2]
4	(Czech Republic) M Damm (India) L Paes	7^{7}	4	[5]
2	(Australia) P Hanley (Zimbabwe) K Ullyett	6^{3}	6	[10]

Final
1	(The Bahamas) M Knowles (Canada) D Nestor	6	2	[1]
2	(Australia) P Hanley (Zimbabwe) K Ullyett	1	6	[10]
