= 2006 Dubai Tennis Championships – Men's singles =

Men's singles
- 2006 Dubai Tennis Championships

Final
- Champion: (Spain) Rafael Nadal
- Runner-up: (Switzerland) Roger Federer
- Score: 2–6, 6–4, 6–4

Details
- Draw: 32
- Seeds: 8

Events
Singles	men	women
Doubles	men	women
- Dubai Tennis Championships

Rafael Nadal defeated the defending champion Roger Federer in the final, 2–6, 6–4, 6–4 to win the men's singles tennis title at the 2006 Dubai Tennis Championships.

== Seeds ==
1. (Switzerland) Roger Federer (final)
2. (Spain) Rafael Nadal (champion)
3. (Russia) Nikolay Davydenko (first round)
4. (United States) Andre Agassi (second round)
5. (Spain) David Ferrer (first round)
6. (Slovakia) Dominik Hrbatý (first round)
7. (Czech Republic) Radek Štěpánek (second round)
8. (Czech Republic) Tomáš Berdych (second round)

== Draw ==
Key

- Q = Qualifier
- WC = Wild card
- LL = Lucky loser
- Alt = Alternate
- ITF = ITF entry
- PR = Protected ranking
- SR = Special ranking
- SE = Special exempt
- JE = Junior exempt
- JR = Junior Accelerator Programme entrant
- CO = College Accelerator Programme entrant
- NG = Next Gen Accelerator Program entrant
- w/o = Walkover
- r = Retired
- d = Defaulted

=== Finals ===
Semifinals
1	(Switzerland) Roger Federer	6	6
(Russia) Mikhail Youzhny	2	3
(Germany) Rainer Schüttler	4	2
2	(Spain) Rafael Nadal	6	6

Final
1	(Switzerland) Roger Federer	6	4	4
2	(Spain) Rafael Nadal	2	6	6

=== Section 1 ===
First round
1	(Switzerland) R Federer	7^{7}	6
(Switzerland) S Wawrinka	6^{3}	3
WC	(United Arab Emirates) O Alawadhi	6^{4}	2
WC	(Kuwait) M Ghareeb	7^{7}	6
(Czech Republic) R Vik	6	6
Q	(Serbia and Montenegro) J Tipsarević	2	4
(Belgium) C Rochus	4	2
8	(Czech Republic) T Berdych	6	6
3	(Russia) N Davydenko	6	2	2
(Russia) M Safin	4	6	6
(Belgium) O Rochus	6	6
(France) F Santoro	4	1
(Russia) I Andreev	7^{7}	1	6
(Italy) A Seppi	6^{5}	6	4
(Russia) M Youzhny	7	1	6
6	(Slovakia) D Hrbatý	5	6	4

Second round
1	(Switzerland) R Federer	7^{7}	6
WC	(Kuwait) M Ghareeb	6^{5}	4
(Czech Republic) R Vik	3	7^{7}	6
8	(Czech Republic) T Berdych	6	6^{5}	2
(Russia) M Safin	6^{5}	4
(Belgium) O Rochus	7^{7}	6
(Russia) I Andreev	1	6^{4}
(Russia) M Youzhny	6	7^{7}

Quarterfinals
1	(Switzerland) R Federer	6	6
(Czech Republic) R Vik	3	2
(Belgium) O Rochus	3	1
(Russia) M Youzhny	6	6

Semifinals
1	(Switzerland) R Federer	6	6
(Russia) M Youzhny	2	3

=== Section 2 ===
First round
5	(Spain) D Ferrer	2	6	5
(Germany) R Schüttler	6	3	7
Q	(Slovakia) I Klec	6	6
(Italy) D Bracciali	4	4
LL	(Italy) G Galimberti	7	3	2
(Germany) B Phau	5	6	6
(United Kingdom) G Rusedski	6^{4}	0
4	(United States) A Agassi	7^{7}	6
7	(Czech Republic) R Štěpánek	6	7^{8}
Q	(Netherlands) J van Lottum	3	6^{6}
WC	(United Kingdom) T Henman	6	7^{8}
(Spain) F López	2	6^{6}
(South Africa) W Moodie	4	4
Q	(Morocco) Y El Aynaoui	6	6
(France) P-H Mathieu	7^{7}	1	2
2	(Spain) R Nadal	6^{5}	6	6

Second round
(Germany) R Schüttler	7	6
Q	(Slovakia) I Klec	5	4
(Germany) B Phau	7	7
4	(United States) A Agassi	5	5
7	(Czech Republic) R Štěpánek	5	6	6^{3}
WC	(United Kingdom) T Henman	7	2	7^{7}
Q	(Morocco) Y El Aynaoui
2	(Spain) R Nadal	w/o

Quarterfinals
(Germany) R Schüttler	6	6
(Germany) B Phau	4	1
WC	(United Kingdom) T Henman	6^{1}	1
2	(Spain) R Nadal	7^{7}	6

Semifinals
(Germany) R Schüttler	4	2
2	(Spain) R Nadal	6	6
