= 2012 Internationaux de Strasbourg – Singles =

Singles
- 2012 Internationaux de Strasbourg

Final
- Champion: (Italy) Francesca Schiavone
- Runner-up: (France) Alizé Cornet
- Score: 6–4, 6–4

Details
- Draw: 32
- Seeds: 8

Events
Singles	Doubles
- Internationaux de Strasbourg

Andrea Petkovic was the defending champion, but did not participate because of an ankle injury.

Francesca Schiavone won the title, defeating Alizé Cornet in the final 6–4, 6–4.

== Seeds ==
1. (Germany) Sabine Lisicki (first round)
2. (Italy) Francesca Schiavone (champion)
3. (Russia) Maria Kirilenko (first round, retired)
4. (Spain) Anabel Medina Garrigues (quarterfinals)
5. (Germany) Mona Barthel (first round)
6. (New Zealand) Marina Erakovic (first round)
7. (Czech Republic) Klára Zakopalová (withdrew)
8. (Austria) Tamira Paszek (second round)
9. (Canada) Aleksandra Wozniak (first round)

== Draw ==
Key

- Q = Qualifier
- WC = Wild card
- LL = Lucky loser
- Alt = Alternate
- ITF = ITF entry
- PR = Protected ranking
- SR = Special ranking
- SE = Special exempt
- JE = Junior exempt
- JR = Junior Accelerator Programme entrant
- CO = College Accelerator Programme entrant
- NG = Next Gen Accelerator Program entrant
- w/o = Walkover
- r = Retired
- d = Defaulted

=== Finals ===
Semifinals
(France) Pauline Parmentier	6	1	3
WC	(France) Alizé Cornet	4	6	6
(United States) Sloane Stephens	5	1
2	(Italy) Francesca Schiavone	7	6

Final
WC	(France) Alizé Cornet	4	4
2	(Italy) Francesca Schiavone	6	6

=== Top half ===
First round
1/WC	(Germany) S Lisicki	4	4
(France) P Parmentier	6	6
(United Kingdom) E Baltacha	4	0
(France) S Foretz Gacon	6	6
LL	(Luxembourg) M Minella	6^{3}	3
(Czech Republic) L Hradecká	7^{7}	6
Q	(Russia) A Panova	6	7^{9}
5	(Germany) M Barthel	3	6^{7}
4	(Spain) A Medina Garrigues	7	4	6
(Georgia (country)) A Tatishvili	5	6	1
(Chinese Taipei) S-w Hsieh	6^{5}	6	6
(Romania) I-C Begu	7^{7}	3	1
WC	(France) A Cornet	6	2	6
(Belarus) O Govortsova	4	6	3
(Israel) S Pe'er	7	6
9	(Canada) A Wozniak	5	0

Second round
(France) P Parmentier	3	6	6
(France) S Foretz Gacon	6	2	3
(Czech Republic) L Hradecká	3	6	3
Q	(Russia) A Panova	6	4	6
4	(Spain) A Medina Garrigues	7^{11}	7^{7}
(Chinese Taipei) S-w Hsieh	6^{9}	6^{2}
WC	(France) A Cornet	4	6	6
(Israel) S Pe'er	6	4	0

Quarterfinals
(France) P Parmentier	6	6
Q	(Russia) A Panova	3	3
4	(Spain) A Medina Garrigues	6^{2}	6^{5}
WC	(France) A Cornet	7^{7}	7^{7}

Semifinals
(France) P Parmentier	6	1	3
WC	(France) A Cornet	4	6	6

=== Bottom half ===
First round
6	(New Zealand) M Erakovic	1	3
(Japan) A Morita	6	6
WC	(France) V Razzano	1	6	7
LL	(Spain) MJ Martínez Sánchez	6	2	5
(Hungary) T Babos	3
Q	(Latvia) A Sevastova	0^{r}
(United States) S Stephens	3	7
3	(Russia) M Kirilenko	6	5	r
8	(Austria) T Paszek	6	0	6
(Italy) A Brianti	4	6	4
(Sweden) J Larsson	3	7^{7}	7^{8}
Q	(United States) L Davis	6	6^{5}	6^{6}
Q	(Croatia) M Lučić	2	7	6
(United Kingdom) A Keothavong	6	5	4
(Romania) A Cadanțu	1	2
2	(Italy) F Schiavone	6	6

Second round
(Japan) A Morita	6	6
WC	(France) V Razzano	1	3
(Hungary) T Babos	2	6	3
(United States) S Stephens	6	3	6
8	(Austria) T Paszek	2	0
(Sweden) J Larsson	6	6
Q	(Croatia) M Lučić	1	2
2	(Italy) F Schiavone	6	6

Quarterfinals
(Japan) A Morita	3	4
(United States) S Stephens	6	6
(Sweden) J Larsson	0	3
2	(Italy) F Schiavone	6	6

Semifinals
(United States) S Stephens	5	1
2	(Italy) F Schiavone	7	6

== Qualifying ==
=== Seeds ===
1. (Spain) María José Martínez Sánchez (qualifying competition, lucky loser)
2. (Russia) Alexandra Panova (qualified)
3. (Luxembourg) Mandy Minella (qualifying competition, lucky loser)
4. (United States) Jamie Hampton (second round)
5. (Spain) Laura Pous Tió (first round)
6. (Canada) Stéphanie Dubois (qualifying competition)
7. (Chinese Taipei) Chang Kai-chen (first round)
8. (Croatia) Mirjana Lučić (qualified)

=== Qualifiers ===
1. (Croatia) Mirjana Lučić
2. (Russia) Alexandra Panova
3. (United States) Lauren Davis
4. (Latvia) Anastasija Sevastova

=== Lucky loser ===
1. (Spain) María José Martínez Sánchez
2. (Luxembourg) Mandy Minella

=== Qualifying draw ===
==== First qualifier ====
First round
(Venezuela) Andrea Gámiz	6	6
WC	(Germany) Syna Kayser	1	2
(Croatia) Ana Vrljić	5	6^{4}
WC	(France) Myrtille Georges	7	7^{7}
(Mexico) Ximena Hermoso	0	0
8	(Croatia) Mirjana Lučić	6	6

Second round
1	(Spain) María José Martínez Sánchez	6	6
(Venezuela) Andrea Gámiz	3	3
WC	(France) Myrtille Georges	4	6	3
8	(Croatia) Mirjana Lučić	6	2	6

Qualifying competition
1	(Spain) María José Martínez Sánchez	6	5	4
8	(Croatia) Mirjana Lučić	4	7	6

==== Second qualifier ====
First round
(Germany) Kathrin Wörle	6	6
(Croatia) Ani Mijačika	3	3
(Russia) Marina Shamayko	6	3	6
(Switzerland) Conny Perrin	3	6	4
(Australia) Daniella Jeflea	5	3
6	(Canada) Stéphanie Dubois	7	6

Second round
2	(Russia) Alexandra Panova	6	7^{7}
(Germany) Kathrin Wörle	4	6^{2}
(Russia) Marina Shamayko	3	4
6	(Canada) Stéphanie Dubois	6	6

Qualifying competition
2	(Russia) Alexandra Panova	6	6
6	(Canada) Stéphanie Dubois	3	4

==== Third qualifier ====
First round
3	(Luxembourg) Mandy Minella	6	6
WC	(Luxembourg) Claudine Schaul	2	2
WC	(France) Jessica Ginier	6^{3}	7^{7}	1
(Austria) Tina Schiechtl	7^{7}	6^{5}	6
(France) Caroline Garcia	4	6	6
(Japan) Shuko Aoyama	6	3	2
(United States) Lauren Davis	6	6
7	(Chinese Taipei) Chang Kai-chen	4	2

Second round
3	(Luxembourg) Mandy Minella	6	4	6
(Austria) Tina Schiechtl	2	6	3
(France) Caroline Garcia	2	1
(United States) Lauren Davis	6	6

Qualifying competition
3	(Luxembourg) Mandy Minella	6	3	4
(United States) Lauren Davis	2	6	6

==== Fourth qualifier ====
First round
4	(United States) Jamie Hampton	6	6
(France) Audrey Bergot	1	2
(Italy) Anna Floris	4	6^{6}
(Slovakia) Lenka Juríková	6	7^{8}
(Spain) Leticia Costas Moreira	7^{7}	6
WC	(France) Océane Adam	6^{2}	4
(Latvia) Anastasija Sevastova	6	6
5	(Spain) Laura Pous Tió	3	2

Second round
4	(United States) Jamie Hampton	6^{2}	6	4
(Slovakia) Lenka Juríková	7^{7}	2	6
(Spain) Leticia Costas Moreira	6^{3}	2
(Latvia) Anastasija Sevastova	7^{7}	6

Qualifying competition
(Slovakia) Lenka Juríková	0	1
(Latvia) Anastasija Sevastova	6	6
