= 2007 Italian Open – Women's singles =

Women's singles
- 2007 Italian Open

Final
- Champion: (Serbia) Jelena Janković
- Runner-up: (Russia) Svetlana Kuznetsova
- Score: 7–5, 6–1

Details
- Draw: 56
- Seeds: 16

Events
Singles	men	women
Doubles	men	women
← 2006 ·	Italian Open	· 2008 →

Jelena Janković defeated Svetlana Kuznetsova in the final, 7–5, 6–1 to win the women's singles tennis title at the 2007 Italian Open. It was her second Tier I title.

Martina Hingis was the reigning champion, but did not participate this year due to a hip injury.

== Seeds ==
The top eight seeds received a bye into the second round.

1. (France) Amélie Mauresmo (second round)
2. (Russia) Svetlana Kuznetsova (finals)
3. (Serbia) Jelena Janković (champion)
4. (Czech Republic) Nicole Vaidišová (withdrew due to a right wrist injury)
5. (Russia) Nadia Petrova (third round; retired due to low back pain)
6. (Russia) Dinara Safina (quarterfinals)
7. (Russia) Anna Chakvetadze (third round)
8. (United States) Serena Williams (quarterfinals)
9. (Slovakia) Daniela Hantuchová (semifinals)
10. (Russia) Elena Dementieva (quarterfinals)
11. (Israel) Shahar Pe'er (third round)
12. (Serbia) Ana Ivanovic (withdrew due to an ankle injury)
13. (China) Li Na (withdrew due to gastrointestinal illness)
14. (Switzerland) Patty Schnyder (semifinals)
15. (Slovenia) Katarina Srebotnik (second round)
16. (Italy) Tathiana Garbin (second round)

== Draw ==
=== Key ===
- Q = Qualifier
- WC = Wild card
- LL = Lucky loser
- Alt = Alternate
- ITF = ITF entry
- PR = Protected ranking
- SR = Special ranking
- SE = Special exempt
- JE = Junior exempt
- JR = Junior Accelerator Programme entrant
- CO = College Accelerator Programme entrant
- NG = Next Gen Accelerator Program entrant
- w/o = Walkover
- r = Retired
- d = Defaulted

=== Finals ===
Quarterfinals
14	(Switzerland) Patty Schnyder	6	2	7^{7}
8	(United States) Serena Williams	3	6	6^{5}
3	(Serbia) Jelena Janković	6	6
10	(Russia) Elena Dementieva	2	1
9	(Slovakia) Daniela Hantuchová	7^{10}	7
(Spain) Anabel Medina Garrigues	6^{8}	5
6	(Russia) Dinara Safina	1	3
2	(Russia) Svetlana Kuznetsova	6	6

Semifinals
14	(Switzerland) Patty Schnyder	1	3
3	(Serbia) Jelena Janković	6	6
9	(Slovakia) Daniela Hantuchová	4	2
2	(Russia) Svetlana Kuznetsova	6	6

Final
3	(Serbia) Jelena Janković	7	6
2	(Russia) Svetlana Kuznetsova	5	1

=== Top half ===
==== Section 1 ====
First round
(Italy) F Schiavone	3	4
(Australia) S Stosur	6	6
(United States) M Tu	2	6	6
(Italy) R Vinci	6	2	4
(Russia) V Bardina	1	2
14	(Switzerland) P Schnyder	6	6
11	(Israel) S Pe'er	6	2
(Poland) A Radwańska	0	0	r
(Russia) M Kirilenko	4	7	5
(Japan) A Sugiyama	6	5	7
LL	(Netherlands) M Krajicek	6	6
(Russia) O Puchkova	1	2

Second round
1	(France) A Mauresmo	5	7	6^{7}
(Australia) S Stosur	7	6^{4}	7
(United States) M Tu	4	0
14	(Switzerland) P Schnyder	6	6
11	(Israel) S Pe'er	6	6
(Japan) A Sugiyama	0	2
LL	(Netherlands) M Krajicek	4	1
8	(United States) S Williams	6	6

Third round
(Australia) S Stosur	4	4
14	(Switzerland) P Schnyder	6	6
11	(Israel) S Pe'er	3	3
8	(United States) S Williams	6	6

Quarterfinals
14	(Switzerland) P Schnyder	6	2	7
8	(United States) S Williams	3	6	6^{5}

==== Section 2 ====
First round
(Australia) N Pratt	7	0	2
Q	(Austria) T Paszek	6^{1}	6	6
(Ukraine) A Bondarenko	6^{6}	7	6
Q	(China) T Sun	7	5	2
(Italy) F Pennetta	3	6^{3}
16	(Italy) T Garbin	6	7
10	(Russia) E Dementieva	6	6
WC	(Italy) ME Camerin	1	2
Q	(Colombia) C Castaño	6	7
WC	(Italy) K Knapp	1	5
(United States) M Shaughnessy	6	6
(France) É Loit	3	2

Second round
3	(Serbia) J Janković	6	6
Q	(Austria) T Paszek	3	4
(Ukraine) A Bondarenko	6	6
16	(Italy) T Garbin	4	2
10	(Russia) E Dementieva	6	6
Q	(Colombia) C Castaño	4	3
(United States) M Shaughnessy	6^{5}	1
5	(Russia) N Petrova	7	6

Third round
3	(Serbia) J Janković	6	7
(Ukraine) A Bondarenko	4	5
10	(Russia) E Dementieva	4
5	(Russia) N Petrova	3	r

Quarterfinals
3	(Serbia) J Janković	6	6
10	(Russia) E Dementieva	2	1

=== Bottom half ===
==== Section 3 ====
First round
Q	(China) Z Yan	2	6	6
(France) S Brémond	6	0	3
(Austria) S Bammer	7	7
(Argentina) G Dulko	5	5
Q	(France) A Rezaï	6	1	2
9	(Slovakia) D Hantuchová	4	6	6
15	(Slovenia) K Srebotnik	6	6
(Germany) M Müller	4	2
(Spain) A Medina Garrigues	6	6
(China) J Zheng	2	2
WC	(Italy) A Brianti	2	3
Q	(Russia) G Voskoboeva	6	6

Second round
7	(Russia) A Chakvetadze	6	6
Q	(China) Z Yan	1	3
(Austria) S Bammer	1	2
9	(Slovakia) D Hantuchová	6	6
15	(Slovenia) K Srebotnik	3	2
(Spain) A Medina Garrigues	6	6
Q	(Russia) G Voskoboeva	6	4	4
LL	(Italy) N Viérin	4	6	6

Third round
7	(Russia) A Chakvetadze	2	3
9	(Slovakia) D Hantuchová	6	6
(Spain) A Medina Garrigues	6	6
LL	(Italy) N Viérin	1	1

Quarterfinals
9	(Slovakia) D Hantuchová	7	7
(Spain) A Medina Garrigues	6^{8}	5

==== Section 4 ====
First round
LL	(Spain) L Domínguez Lino	3	3
(Estonia) K Kanepi	6	6
(Greece) E Daniilidou	6	4	3
Q	(Croatia) K Šprem	3	6	6
Q	(Ukraine) K Bondarenko	4	6	6
LL	(Italy) S Errani	6	3	4
LL	(Ukraine) Y Fedak	6	3	6
WC	(Italy) R Oprandi	3	6	3
(Germany) A-L Grönefeld	0	4
(France) N Dechy	6	6
(Japan) A Morigami	2	0
(Italy) M Santangelo	6	6

Second round
6	(Russia) D Safina	7	6
(Estonia) K Kanepi	6^{5}	2
Q	(Croatia) K Šprem	3	4
Q	(Ukraine) K Bondarenko	6	6
LL	(Ukraine) Y Fedak	1	6	6
(France) N Dechy	6	2	2
(Italy) M Santangelo	3	3
2	(Russia) S Kuznetsova	6	6

Third round
6	(Russia) D Safina	6	6
(Ukraine) K Bondarenko	2	3
LL	(Ukraine) Y Fedak	6^{4}	1
2	(Russia) S Kuznetsova	7	6

Quarterfinals
6	(Russia) D Safina	1	3
2	(Russia) S Kuznetsova	6	6
