= 2006 Dubai Tennis Championships – Women's singles =

Women's singles
- 2006 Dubai Tennis Championships

Final
- Champion: (Belgium) Justine Henin-Hardenne
- Runner-up: (Russia) Maria Sharapova
- Score: 7–5, 6–2

Details
- Draw: 28
- Seeds: 8

Events
Singles	men	women
Doubles	men	women
- Dubai Tennis Championships

Lindsay Davenport was the defending champion, but lost to Maria Sharapova in the semifinals.

Justine Henin-Hardenne won the title, defeating Sharapova in the final, 7–5, 6–2.

== Seeds ==
The top four seeds received a bye into the second round.

1. (France) Amélie Mauresmo (quarterfinals)
2. (United States) Lindsay Davenport (semifinals)
3. (Russia) Maria Sharapova (final)
4. (Belgium) Justine Henin-Hardenne (champion)
5. (Russia) Nadia Petrova (first round)
6. (Russia) Anastasia Myskina (second round)
7. (Italy) Francesca Schiavone (quarterfinals)
8. (Slovakia) Daniela Hantuchová (second round)

== Draw ==
Key

- Q = Qualifier
- WC = Wild card
- LL = Lucky loser
- Alt = Alternate
- ITF = ITF entry
- PR = Protected ranking
- SR = Special ranking
- SE = Special exempt
- JE = Junior exempt
- JR = Junior Accelerator Programme entrant
- CO = College Accelerator Programme entrant
- NG = Next Gen Accelerator Program entrant
- w/o = Walkover
- r = Retired
- d = Defaulted

=== Finals ===
Semifinals
(Russia) Svetlana Kuznetsova	2	5
4	(Belgium) Justine Henin-Hardenne	6	7
3	(Russia) Maria Sharapova	3	6	6
2	(United States) Lindsay Davenport	6	1	3

Final
4	(Belgium) Justine Henin-Hardenne	7	6
3	(Russia) Maria Sharapova	5	2

=== Top half ===
First round
Q	(Hungary) K Nagy	2	0
Q	(Slovakia) H Nagyová	6	6
(Russia) S Kuznetsova	6	6
Q	(Germany) M Müller	2	0
(China) N Li	6	4	6^{4}
8	(Slovakia) D Hantuchová	3	6	7
Q	(Ukraine) K Bondarenko	6^{4}	6	7
(Czech Republic) K Peschke	7	3	6^{2}
(Russia) V Zvonareva	6	5	3
WC	(Tunisia) S Sfar	2	7	6
(France) V Razzano	4	4
7	(Italy) F Schiavone	6	6

Second round
1/WC	(France) A Mauresmo	6	6
Q	(Slovakia) H Nagyová	3	1
(Russia) S Kuznetsova	3	6	7
8	(Slovakia) D Hantuchová	6	1	5
4	(Belgium) J Henin-Hardenne	6	7
Q	(Ukraine) K Bondarenko	4	5
WC	(Tunisia) S Sfar	2	3
7	(Italy) F Schiavone	6	6

Quarterfinals
1/WC	(France) A Mauresmo	6^{11}	4
(Russia) S Kuznetsova	7	6
4	(Belgium) J Henin-Hardenne	6	7
7	(Italy) F Schiavone	4	6^{5}

Semifinals
(Russia) S Kuznetsova	2	5
4	(Belgium) J Henin-Hardenne	6	7

=== Bottom half ===
First round
6	(Russia) A Myskina	6	6^{7}	6
(China) J Zheng	3	7	1
WC	(Switzerland) M Hingis	6	7
(India) S Mirza	3	5
(Russia) V Dushevina	6	6
(France) M Bartoli	3	1
5	(Russia) N Petrova	4	1
(Russia) M Kirilenko	6	6
(Japan) A Sugiyama	2	3
(Czech Republic) L Šafářová	6	6
(Russia) E Likhovtseva	7	7
(Serbia and Montenegro) J Janković	5	5

Second round
6	(Russia) A Myskina	4	3
WC	(Switzerland) M Hingis	6	6
(Russia) V Dushevina	1	0
3	(Russia) M Sharapova	6	6
(Russia) M Kirilenko	6	6
(Czech Republic) L Šafářová	4	3
(Russia) E Likhovtseva	0	0
2	(United States) L Davenport	6	6

Quarterfinals
WC	(Switzerland) M Hingis	3	4
3	(Russia) M Sharapova	6	6
(Russia) M Kirilenko	6	2	3
2	(United States) L Davenport	4	6	6

Semifinals
3	(Russia) M Sharapova	3	6	6
2	(United States) L Davenport	6	1	3
