= 2006 Dubai Tennis Championships – Women's doubles =

Women's doubles
- 2006 Dubai Tennis Championships

Final
- Champions: (Czech Republic) Květa Peschke (Italy) Francesca Schiavone
- Runners-up: (Russia) Svetlana Kuznetsova (Russia) Nadia Petrova
- Score: 3–6, 7–6^{(7–1)}, 6–3

Events
Singles	men	women
Doubles	men	women
- Dubai Tennis Championships

Virginia Ruano Pascual and Paola Suárez were the defending champions, but neither of them competed this year.

Květa Peschke and Francesca Schiavone won the title by defeating Svetlana Kuznetsova and Nadia Petrova 3–6, 7–6^{(7–1)}, 6–3 in the final.

== Seeds ==
1. (Russia) Elena Likhovtseva / (Russia) Vera Zvonareva (quarterfinals)
2. (China) Yan Zi / (China) Zheng Jie (quarterfinals)
3. (Slovakia) Daniela Hantuchová / (Japan) Ai Sugiyama (semifinals)
4. (South Africa) Liezel Huber / (United States) Martina Navratilova (first round)

== Draw ==
Key

- Q = Qualifier
- WC = Wild card
- LL = Lucky loser
- Alt = Alternate
- ITF = ITF entry
- PR = Protected ranking
- SR = Special ranking
- SE = Special exempt
- JE = Junior exempt
- JR = Junior Accelerator Programme entrant
- CO = College Accelerator Programme entrant
- NG = Next Gen Accelerator Program entrant
- w/o = Walkover
- r = Retired
- d = Defaulted

First round
1	(Russia) E Likhovtseva (Russia) V Zvonareva	6	6
WC	(Russia) A Rodionova (Russia) E Vesnina	3	2
Q	(Ukraine) A Bondarenko (Ukraine) K Bondarenko	6	6
(Russia) V Dushevina (Croatia) J Kostanić	2	2
4	(South Africa) L Huber (United States) M Navratilova	1	5
WC	(Serbia and Montenegro) J Janković (China) N Li	6	7
(Slovenia) T Križan (Romania) A Vanc	5	3
(Czech Republic) K Peschke (Italy) F Schiavone	7	6
(Russia) M Kirilenko (Russia) A Myskina	3	4
(India) S Mirza (Venezuela) M Vento-Kabchi	6	6
(Slovakia) H Nagyová (United States) M Washington	4	3
3	(Slovakia) D Hantuchová (Japan) A Sugiyama	6	6
PR	(China) T Li (China) T Sun	4	6^{7}
(Russia) S Kuznetsova (Russia) N Petrova	6	7^{9}
(France) S Cohen-Aloro (Tunisia) S Sfar	2	6^{2}
2	(China) Z Yan (China) J Zheng	6	7^{7}

Quarterfinals
1	(Russia) E Likhovtseva (Russia) V Zvonareva	6	4	4
Q	(Ukraine) A Bondarenko (Ukraine) K Bondarenko	3	6	6
WC	(Serbia and Montenegro) J Janković (China) N Li	5	4
(Czech Republic) K Peschke (Italy) F Schiavone	7	6
(India) S Mirza (Venezuela) M Vento-Kabchi	3	2
3	(Slovakia) D Hantuchová (Japan) A Sugiyama	6	6
(Russia) S Kuznetsova (Russia) N Petrova	6	6
2	(China) Z Yan (China) J Zheng	2	1

Semifinals
Q	(Ukraine) A Bondarenko (Ukraine) K Bondarenko	2	4
(Czech Republic) K Peschke (Italy) F Schiavone	6	6
3	(Slovakia) D Hantuchová (Japan) A Sugiyama	4	6	4
(Russia) S Kuznetsova (Russia) N Petrova	6	2	6

Final
(Czech Republic) K Peschke (Italy) F Schiavone	3	7^{7}	6
(Russia) S Kuznetsova (Russia) N Petrova	6	6^{1}	3
