= 2006 Fortis Championships Luxembourg – Doubles =

Doubles
- 2006 Fortis Championships Luxembourg

Final
- Champions: (Czech Republic) Květa Peschke (Italy) Francesca Schiavone
- Runners-up: (Germany) Anna-Lena Grönefeld (South Africa) Liezel Huber
- Score: 2–6, 6–4, 6–1

Details
- Draw: 16
- Seeds: 4

Events
| Singles | Doubles |
| ← 2005 · | Luxembourg Open | · 2007 → |

Lisa Raymond and Samantha Stosur were the defending champions, but lost in first round to Nathalie Dechy and Tatiana Golovin.

Květa Peschke and Francesca Schiavone won the title by defeating Anna-Lena Grönefeld and Liezel Huber 2–6, 6–4, 6–1 in the final.

== Seeds ==
1. (United States) Lisa Raymond / (Australia) Samantha Stosur (first round)
2. (Russia) Dinara Safina / (Slovenia) Katarina Srebotnik (semifinals)
3. (Czech Republic) Květa Peschke / (Italy) Francesca Schiavone (champions)
4. (Germany) Anna-Lena Grönefeld / (South Africa) Liezel Huber (final)

== Draw ==
Key

- Q = Qualifier
- WC = Wild card
- LL = Lucky loser
- Alt = Alternate
- ITF = ITF entry
- PR = Protected ranking
- SR = Special ranking
- SE = Special exempt
- JE = Junior exempt
- JR = Junior Accelerator Programme entrant
- CO = College Accelerator Programme entrant
- NG = Next Gen Accelerator Program entrant
- w/o = Walkover
- r = Retired
- d = Defaulted

=== Draw ===
First round
1 | (United States) L Raymond (Australia) S Stosur | 3 | 3
(France) N Dechy (France) T Golovin | 6 | 6
Q | (Germany) K Barrois (Poland) A Radwańska | 4 | 4
(Canada) M Drake (Germany) J Schruff | 6 | 6
3 | (Czech Republic) K Peschke (Italy) F Schiavone | 6 | 6
(Czech Republic) I Benešová (Ukraine) Y Fedak | 3 | 3
WC | (Belgium) K Flipkens (Belgium) Y Wickmayer | 6 | 6
(Germany) M Müller (Germany) J Wöhr | 3 | 4
(Russia) E Dementieva (Netherlands) M Krajicek | 6 | 6
(Ukraine) A Bondarenko (Ukraine) K Bondarenko | 3 | 1
(Czech Republic) G Navrátilová (Czech Republic) V Uhlířová | 4 | 2
4 | (Germany) A-L Grönefeld (Germany) L Huber | 6 | 6
(Czech Republic) E Birnerová (Romania) A Vanc | 6 | 6
(Slovakia) J Gajdošová (Australia) B Stewart | 3 | 4
(Italy) ME Camerin (Switzerland) E Gagliardi | 4 | 3
2 | (Russia) D Safina (Slovenia) K Srebotnik | 6 | 6

Quarterfinals
(France) N Dechy (France) T Golovin | 6 | 6
(Canada) M Drake (Germany) J Schruff | 0 | 3
3 | (Czech Republic) K Peschke (Italy) F Schiavone | 6 | 6
WC | (Belgium) K Flipkens (Belgium) Y Wickmayer | 0 | 1
(Russia) E Dementieva (Netherlands) M Krajicek | 2 | 3
4 | (Germany) A-L Grönefeld (Germany) L Huber | 6 | 6
(Czech Republic) E Birnerová (Romania) A Vanc | 6^{2} | 4
2 | (Russia) D Safina (Slovenia) K Srebotnik | 7^{7} | 6

Semifinals
(France) N Dechy (France) T Golovin | 2 | 4
3 | (Czech Republic) K Peschke (Italy) F Schiavone | 6 | 6
4 | (Germany) A-L Grönefeld (Germany) L Huber | 6 | 5 | 6
2 | (Russia) D Safina (Slovenia) K Srebotnik | 4 | 7 | 1

Final
3 | (Czech Republic) K Peschke (Italy) F Schiavone | 2 | 6 | 6
4 | (Germany) A-L Grönefeld (Germany) L Huber | 6 | 4 | 1
