= 2006 Fortis Championships Luxembourg – Singles =

Singles
- 2006 Fortis Championships Luxembourg

Final
- Champion: (Ukraine) Alona Bondarenko
- Runner-up: (Italy) Francesca Schiavone
- Score: 6–3, 6–2

Details
- Draw: 28
- Seeds: 8

Events
Singles	Doubles
- Luxembourg Open

Kim Clijsters was the defending champion, but did not compete this year.

Unseeded Alona Bondarenko won the title by defeating Francesca Schiavone 6–3, 6–2 in the final.

== Seeds ==
The top four seeds received a bye into the second round.

1. (Russia) Elena Dementieva (quarterfinals)
2. (Russia) Nadia Petrova (second round)
3. (Switzerland) Patty Schnyder (quarterfinals)
4. (Russia) Dinara Safina (quarterfinals)
5. (Italy) Francesca Schiavone (final)
6. (Serbia and Montenegro) Ana Ivanovic (first round)
7. (Germany) Anna-Lena Grönefeld (first round)
8. (France) Mary Pierce (first round)

== Draw ==
Key

- Q = Qualifier
- WC = Wild card
- LL = Lucky loser
- Alt = Alternate
- ITF = ITF entry
- PR = Protected ranking
- SR = Special ranking
- SE = Special exempt
- JE = Junior exempt
- JR = Junior Accelerator Programme entrant
- CO = College Accelerator Programme entrant
- NG = Next Gen Accelerator Program entrant
- w/o = Walkover
- r = Retired
- d = Defaulted

=== Finals ===
Semifinals
Q	(Poland) Agnieszka Radwańska	5	6	1
5	(Italy) Francesca Schiavone	7	2	6
(Czech Republic) Květa Peschke	3	7	5
(Ukraine) Alona Bondarenko	6	5	7

Final
5	(Italy) Francesca Schiavone	3	2
(Ukraine) Alona Bondarenko	6	6

=== Top half ===
First round
WC	(Luxembourg) A Kremer	1	4
(Australia) S Stosur	6	6
(Italy) M Santangelo	7	6^{8}	3
Q	(Poland) A Radwańska	5	7^{10}	6
(United States) V Williams	6	6
6	(Serbia and Montenegro) A Ivanovic	3	4
(Germany) M Müller	3	0
WC	(United States) C Rubin	6	6
Q	(Germany) T Malek	4	3
Q	(Italy) R Vinci	6	6
(Netherlands) M Krajicek	4	3
5	(Italy) F Schiavone	6	6

Second round
1/WC	(Russia) E Dementieva	7	5
(Australia) S Stosur	5	1
Q	(Poland) A Radwańska	6	6
(United States) V Williams	3	0
3	(Switzerland) P Schnyder	6	6
WC	(United States) C Rubin	0	3
Q	(Italy) R Vinci	2	1
5	(Italy) F Schiavone	6	6

Quarterfinals
1/WC	(Russia) E Dementieva	5	2
Q	(Poland) A Radwańska	7	6
3	(Switzerland) P Schnyder	1	1
5	(Italy) F Schiavone	6	6

Semifinals
Q	(Poland) A Radwańska	5	6	1
5	(Italy) F Schiavone	7	2	6

=== Bottom half ===
First round
7	(Germany) A-L Grönefeld	0	4
Q	(Italy) K Knapp	6	6
(Czech Republic) K Peschke	7	6
(Germany) J Schruff	5	1
(Slovakia) D Hantuchová	7^{7}	6
(France) T Golovin	6^{1}	3
8	(France) M Pierce	3	3
(Ukraine) A Bondarenko	6	6
(Slovenia) K Srebotnik	6	6
(Italy) ME Camerin	4	1
(France) N Dechy	6	3	6
(Austria) S Bammer	1	6	3

Second round
Q	(Italy) K Knapp	4	4
(Czech Republic) K Peschke	6	6
(Slovakia) D Hantuchová	5	3
4	(Russia) D Safina	7	6
(Ukraine) A Bondarenko	4	6	6
(Slovenia) K Srebotnik	6	4	3
(France) N Dechy	6	6
2	(Russia) N Petrova	4	3

Quarterfinals
(Czech Republic) K Peschke	6	6
4	(Russia) D Safina	4	3
(Ukraine) A Bondarenko	5	6	6
(France) N Dechy	7	4	0

Semifinals
(Czech Republic) K Peschke	3	7	5
(Ukraine) A Bondarenko	6	5	7
