= 2006 Italian Open – Women's singles =

Women's singles
- 2006 Italian Open

Final
- Champion: (Switzerland) Martina Hingis
- Runner-up: (Russia) Dinara Safina
- Score: 6–2, 7–5

Details
- Draw: 56
- Seeds: 16

Events
Singles	men	women
Doubles	men	women
← 2005 ·	Italian Open	· 2007 →

Martina Hingis defeated Dinara Safina in the final, 6–2, 7–5 to win the women's singles tennis title at the 2006 Italian Open. It was her first title since coming out of retirement.

Amélie Mauresmo was the reigning champion, but withdrew due to illness.

== Seeds ==
The top eight seeds received a bye into the second round. Champion seeds are shown in bold while text in italics indicates the round in which seeds were eliminated.

1. (France) Amélie Mauresmo (withdrew due to illness)
2. (Belgium) Kim Clijsters (third round)
3. (Russia) Maria Sharapova (withdrew due to right foot)
4. (Russia) Nadia Petrova (withdrew due to right pectoralis strain)
5. (Russia) Elena Dementieva (quarterfinals)
6. (Switzerland) Patty Schnyder (third round)
7. (Russia) Svetlana Kuznetsova (semifinals)
8. (Italy) Francesca Schiavone (third round)
9. (United States) Venus Williams (semifinals)
10. (Russia) Anastasia Myskina (third round)
11. (Germany) Anna-Lena Grönefeld (third round)
12. (Czech Republic) Nicole Vaidišová (second round)
13. (Slovakia) Daniela Hantuchová (first round)
14. (Russia) Elena Likhovtseva (first round)
15. (Italy) Flavia Pennetta (quarterfinals)
16. (Russia) Dinara Safina (final)
17. (France) Nathalie Dechy (second round)
18. (Japan) Ai Sugiyama (second round)

== Draw ==
=== Key ===
- Q = Qualifier
- WC = Wild card
- LL = Lucky loser
- Alt = Alternate
- ITF = ITF entry
- PR = Protected ranking
- SR = Special ranking
- SE = Special exempt
- JE = Junior exempt
- JR = Junior Accelerator Programme entrant
- CO = College Accelerator Programme entrant
- NG = Next Gen Accelerator Program entrant
- w/o = Walkover
- r = Retired
- d = Defaulted

=== Finals ===
Quarterfinals
15	(Italy) Flavia Pennetta	3	1
(Switzerland) **Martina Hingis**	**6**	**6**
(Serbia and Montenegro) Jelena Janković	**7**	4	1
9	(United States) **Venus Williams**	5	**6**	**6**
7	(Russia) **Svetlana Kuznetsova**	**6**	5	**7^{7}**
Q	(Italy) Romina Oprandi	4	**7**	6^{5}
5	(Russia) Elena Dementieva	1	1
16	(Russia) **Dinara Safina**	**6**	**6**

Semifinals
(Switzerland) **Martina Hingis**	0	**6**	**6**
9	(United States) Venus Williams	**6**	3	3
7	(Russia) Svetlana Kuznetsova	**6**	4	5
16	(Russia) **Dinara Safina**	3	**6**	**7**

Final
(Switzerland) **Martina Hingis**	**6**	**7**
16	(Russia) Dinara Safina	2	5

=== Top half ===
==== Section 1 ====
First round
(United States) J Craybas	5	4
(Spain) **A Medina Garrigues**	**7**	**6**
(Colombia) **C Castaño**	**6**	**7**
(Argentina) G Dulko	3	6^{0}
Q	(Ukraine) K Bondarenko	2	**6**	4
15	(Italy) **F Pennetta**	**6**	2	**6**
12	(Czech Republic) **N Vaidišová**	5	**6**	**6**
(Finland) E Laine	**7**	1	3
(Switzerland) **M Hingis**	**6**	**6**
Q	(Italy) S Errani	0	1
(Italy) **M Santangelo**	3	**6**	**7**
(Russia) M Kirilenko	**6**	3	5

Second round
18	(Japan) A Sugiyama	2	**6**	4
(Spain) **A Medina Garrigues**	**6**	4	**6**
(Colombia) C Castaño	3	3
15	(Italy) **F Pennetta**	**6**	**6**
12	(Czech Republic) N Vaidišová	5	3
(Switzerland) **M Hingis**	**7**	**6**
(Italy) M Santangelo	4	0
8	(Italy) **F Schiavone**	**6**	**6**

Third round
(Spain) A Medina Garrigues	3	**6**	4
15	(Italy) **F Pennetta**	**6**	3	**6**
(Switzerland) **M Hingis**	**6**	**7**
8	(Italy) F Schiavone	0	5

Quarterfinals
15	(Italy) F Pennetta	3	1
(Switzerland) **M Hingis**	**6**	**6**

==== Section 2 ====
First round
(Slovenia) **K Srebotnik**	**6**	**6**
(Australia) A Molik	2	0
LL	(Spain) **M Sánchez Lorenzo**	**6**	**6**
WC	(Italy) T Garbin	4	4
(Serbia and Montenegro) **J Janković**	**6**	**6**
14	(Russia) E Likhovtseva	4	3
9	(United States) **V Williams**	**6**	**6**
Q	(Czech Republic) Z Ondrášková	3	2
(Czech Republic) **L Šafářová**	**7**	**6**
(Czech Republic) K Peschke	6^{1}	4
(Czech Republic) K Koukalová	2	1
(Russia) **V Dushevina**	**6**	**6**

Second round
LL	(Russia) E Bychkova	**6**	3	2
(Slovenia) **K Srebotnik**	3	**6**	**6**
LL	(Spain) M Sánchez Lorenzo	3	**6**	2
(Serbia and Montenegro) **J Janković**	**6**	4	**6**
9	(United States) **V Williams**	**6**	**6**
(Czech Republic) L Šafářová	1	4
(Russia) V Dushevina	6^{8}	2
6	(Switzerland) **P Schnyder**	**7**	**6**

Third round
(Slovenia) K Srebotnik	6^{7}	1
(Serbia and Montenegro) **J Janković**	**7**	**6**
9	(United States) **V Williams**	**7**	3	**6**
6	(Switzerland) P Schnyder	6^{2}	**6**	1

Quarterfinals
(Serbia and Montenegro) J Janković	**7**	4	1
9	(United States) **V Williams**	5	**6**	**6**

=== Bottom half ===
==== Section 3 ====
First round
(Israel) **A Smashnova**	4	**6**	**6**
LL	(Estonia) M Ani	**6**	0	4
(Sweden) S Arvidsson	2	1
(Italy) **R Vinci**	**6**	**6**
Q	(Belarus) V Azarenka	3	**6**	6^{6}
10	(Russia) **A Myskina**	**6**	3	**7**
13	(Slovakia) D Hantuchová	2	**6**	3
(Australia) **S Stosur**	**6**	1	**6**
Q	(Puerto Rico) K Brandi	0	**7**	3
Q	(Italy) **R Oprandi**	**6**	5	**6**
(Russia) **V Zvonareva**	1	**6**	**6**
(Israel) S Pe'er	**6**	2	0

Second round
7	(Russia) **S Kuznetsova**	**6**	**6**
(Israel) A Smashnova	1	3
(Italy) R Vinci	0	**6**	4
10	(Russia) **A Myskina**	**6**	1	**6**
(Australia) S Stosur	2	2
Q	(Italy) **R Oprandi**	**6**	**6**
(Russia) **V Zvonareva**	**6**	**6**
17	(France) N Dechy	2	2

Third round
7	(Russia) **S Kuznetsova**	**6**	**6**
10	(Russia) A Myskina	1	4
Q	(Italy) **R Oprandi**	**6**	**6**
(Russia) V Zvonareva	0	1

Quarterfinals
7	(Russia) **S Kuznetsova**	**6**	5	**7**
Q	(Italy) R Oprandi	4	**7**	6^{4}

==== Section 4 ====
First round
(Spain) L Domínguez Lino	3	0	r
(China) **S Peng**	**6**	3
(Japan) **A Nakamura**	**7**	**6**
(Poland) M Domachowska	6^{5}	3
(France) V Razzano	2	**6**	4
11	(Germany) **A-L Grönefeld**	**6**	4	**6**
16	(Russia) **D Safina**	**6**	**6**
Q	(Spain) L Pous Tió	4	2
WC	(Italy) **ME Camerin**	**7**	4
WC	(Italy) N Viérin	5	1	r
(Russia) A Chakvetadze	**6**	2	2^{r}
Q	(Japan) **A Morigami**	4	**6**	4

Second round
5	(Russia) **E Dementieva**	w	/	o
(China) S Peng
(Japan) A Nakamura	4	3
11	(Germany) **A-L Grönefeld**	**6**	**6**
16	(Russia) **D Safina**	**6**	**6**
WC	(Italy) ME Camerin	4	4
Q	(Japan) A Morigami	**6**	1	3
2	(Belgium) **K Clijsters**	4	**6**	**6**

Third round
5	(Russia) **E Dementieva**	**7**	3	**6**
11	(Germany) A-L Grönefeld	6^{1}	**6**	1
16	(Russia) **D Safina**	**6**	**7**
2	(Belgium) K Clijsters	4	6^{2}

Quarterfinals
5	(Russia) E Dementieva	1	1
16	(Russia) **D Safina**	**6**	**6**
