= 2006 Rogers Cup – Singles =

Singles
- 2006 Rogers Cup

Final
- Champion: (Serbia) Ana Ivanovic
- Runner-up: (Switzerland) Martina Hingis
- Score: 6–2, 6–3

Details
- Draw: 56
- Seeds: 16

Events
Singles	Doubles
- Rogers Cup

Ana Ivanovic defeated Martina Hingis in the final, 6–2, 6–3 to win the women's singles tennis title at the 2006 Canadian Open. At 18 years and 41 weeks of age, Ivanovic became the youngest woman to win the tournament (later surpassed by Belinda Bencic in 2015).

Kim Clijsters was the defending champion, but retired due to a left wrist sprain in the second round against Stéphanie Dubois.

== Finals ==
The finals match for the Rogers Cup was fought between Ana Ivanovic of Serbia and Martina Hingis of Switzerland. The match was originally scheduled on the 20th of August but was moved to the next day due to rainfall. This match was their first career encounter with Ivanovic winning. Ivanovic dominated on her serve and just lost 12 points in her eight service games as she broke Hingis' serve four times to win the match 6–2, 6–3 in just 58 minutes.

== Seeds ==
The top eight seeds received a bye into the second round.

1. (Belgium) Kim Clijsters (second round, retired due to a left wrist sprain)
2. (Russia) Maria Sharapova (withdrew)
3. (Russia) Nadia Petrova (second round)
4. (Russia) Svetlana Kuznetsova (quarterfinals)
5. (Czech Republic) Nicole Vaidišová (third round, withdrew due to a right should tendinitis)
6. (Russia) Anastasia Myskina (second round)
7. (Switzerland) Martina Hingis (final)
8. (Italy) Francesca Schiavone (second round)
9. (Russia) Dinara Safina (semifinals)
10. (Germany) Anna-Lena Grönefeld (second round)
11. (Slovakia) Daniela Hantuchová (third round)
12. (Italy) Flavia Pennetta (second round)
13. (Serbia) Ana Ivanovic (champion)
14. (Slovenia) Katarina Srebotnik (quarterfinals)
15. (Russia) Maria Kirilenko (second round)
16. (China) Li Na (first round)
17. (Spain) Anabel Medina Garrigues (second round)

== Draw ==
Key

- Q = Qualifier
- WC = Wild card
- LL = Lucky loser
- Alt = Alternate
- ITF = ITF entry
- PR = Protected ranking
- SR = Special ranking
- SE = Special exempt
- JE = Junior exempt
- JR = Junior Accelerator Programme entrant
- CO = College Accelerator Programme entrant
- NG = Next Gen Accelerator Program entrant
- w/o = Walkover
- r = Retired
- d = Defaulted

=== Finals ===
Quarterfinals
14	(Slovenia) Katarina Srebotnik	4	4
13	(Serbia) Ana Ivanovic	6	6
Q	(Australia) Nicole Pratt	1	0
9	(Russia) Dinara Safina	6	6
7	(Switzerland) Martina Hingis	7	6
4	(Russia) Svetlana Kuznetsova	6^{4}	3
(Israel) Shahar Pe'er	6^{3}	5
(Russia) Anna Chakvetadze	7	7

Semifinals
13	(Serbia) Ana Ivanovic	6	6
9	(Russia) Dinara Safina	1	4
7	(Switzerland) Martina Hingis	6	3
(Russia) Anna Chakvetadze	3	1^{r}

Final
13	(Serbia) Ana Ivanovic	6	6
7	(Switzerland) Martina Hingis	2	3

=== Top half ===
==== Section 1 ====
First round
WC	(Canada) S Dubois	6	6
LL	(Italy) T Garbin	4	4
Q	(Italy) A Brianti	2	6	6
(India) S Mirza	6	1	2
(Netherlands) M Krajicek	3	5
14	(Slovenia) K Srebotnik	6	7
13	(Serbia) A Ivanovic	6	6
(France) T Golovin	4	2
(Colombia) C Castaño	2	6	2
(China) J Zheng	6	2	6
(Serbia) J Janković	6	6
(Ukraine) A Bondarenko	3	4

Second round
1	(Belgium) K Clijsters	6	2	r
WC	(Canada) S Dubois	1	3
Q	(Italy) A Brianti	3	4
14	(Slovenia) K Srebotnik	6	6
13	(Serbia) A Ivanovic	6	6^{5}	6
(China) J Zheng	4	7	2
(Serbia) J Janković	6	6
8	(Italy) F Schiavone	1	4

Third round
WC	(Canada) S Dubois	3	2
14	(Slovenia) K Srebotnik	6	6
13	(Serbia) A Ivanovic	w/o
(Serbia) J Janković

Quarterfinals
14	(Slovenia) K Srebotnik	4	4
13	(Serbia) A Ivanovic	6	6

==== Section 2 ====
First round
(Czech Republic) L Šafářová	7	6
Q	(France) V Razzano	5	4
Q	(Australia) N Pratt	6	6
Q	(Spain) MJ Martínez Sánchez	1	2
WC	(Canada) M-È Pelletier	6	6
16	(China) N Li	4	2
10	(Germany) A-L Grönefeld	6	6
LL	(Germany) J Schruff	3	3
Q	(United States) S Perry	7	6
(Czech Republic) K Peschke	5	2
Q	(Zimbabwe) C Black	7	6
Q	(United States) N Uberoi	6^{6}	2

Second round
5	(Czech Republic) N Vaidišová	3	7	6
(Czech Republic) L Šafářová	6	5	1
Q	(Australia) N Pratt	3	6	6
WC	(Canada) M-È Pelletier	6	4	4
10	(Germany) A-L Grönefeld	6^{5}	2
Q	(United States) S Perry	7	6
Q	(Zimbabwe) C Black	2	2
9	(Russia) D Safina	6	6

Third round
5	(Czech Republic) N Vaidišová
Q	(Australia) N Pratt	w/o
Q	(United States) S Perry	5	3
9	(Russia) D Safina	7	6

Quarterfinals
Q	(Australia) N Pratt	1	0
9	(Russia) D Safina	6	6

=== Bottom half ===
==== Section 3 ====
First round
(Austria) S Bammer	7	4	2
(Italy) M Santangelo	6^{2}	6	6
(Spain) L Domínguez Lino	1	0
Q	(United States) J Jackson	6	6
(Argentina) G Dulko	2	0
11	(Slovakia) D Hantuchová	6	6
17	(Spain) A Medina Garrigues	7	6
(United States) L Granville	5	4
(Japan) A Sugiyama	6	7
WC	(Canada) A Wozniak	3	5
Q	(Poland) M Domachowska	7	7
(Australia) A Molik	6^{1}	6^{5}

Second round
7	(Switzerland) M Hingis	7	7
(Italy) M Santangelo	5	6^{5}
Q	(United States) J Jackson	6^{7}	2
11	(Slovakia) D Hantuchová	7	6
17	(Spain) A Medina Garrigues	4	2
(Japan) A Sugiyama	6	6
Q	(Poland) M Domachowska	1	3
4	(Russia) S Kuznetsova	6	6

Third round
7	(Switzerland) M Hingis	7	6
11	(Slovakia) D Hantuchová	5	4
(Japan) A Sugiyama	2	6^{6}
4	(Russia) S Kuznetsova	6	7

Quarterfinals
7	(Switzerland) M Hingis	7	6
4	(Russia) S Kuznetsova	6^{4}	3

==== Section 4 ====
First round
Q	(Uzbekistan) V Lepchenko	4	4
(Israel) S Pe'er	6	6
(France) M Bartoli	6	6
(Israel) A Smashnova	3	3
Q	(Russia) G Voskoboeva	3	1
12	(Italy) F Pennetta	6	6
15	(Russia) M Kirilenko	6	4	6
(Croatia) J Kostanić	3	6	1
(France) N Dechy	6^{3}	6	6
Q	(Israel) T Obziler	7	2	1
(Russia) A Chakvetadze	7	6
LL	(Russia) V Dushevina	5	3

Second round
6	(Russia) A Myskina	6^{6}	7	4
(Israel) S Pe'er	7	5	6
(France) M Bartoli	7	2
12	(Italy) F Pennetta	5	1	r
15	(Russia) M Kirilenko	4	4
(France) N Dechy	6	6
(Russia) A Chakvetadze	6	6
3	(Russia) N Petrova	1	4

Third round
(Israel) S Pe'er	2	7	6
(France) M Bartoli	6	5	4
(France) N Dechy	1	4
(Russia) A Chakvetadze	6	6

Quarterfinals
(Israel) S Pe'er	6^{3}	5
(Russia) A Chakvetadze	7	7
