= Lomb =

Lomb may refer to:

== People ==
- Kató Lomb (1909–2003), Hungarian interpreter, translator, language genius and one of the first simultaneous interpreters
- Niklas Lomb (born 1993), German football goalkeeper who plays for Preußen Münster on loan from Bayer Leverkusen

== Bausch & Lomb ==
- Bausch & Lomb, American eye health company based in Rochester, New York
- Bausch & Lomb Place, skyscraper located in Rochester, New York
- Henry Lomb (1828–1908), German-American optician who co-founded Bausch & Lomb (with John Jacob Bausch)

=== Bausch & Lomb Tennis Championships ===
- 2007 Bausch & Lomb Championships
  - 2007 Bausch & Lomb Championships – Singles
- 2008 Bausch & Lomb Championships
  - 2008 Bausch & Lomb Championships – Doubles
  - 2008 Bausch & Lomb Championships – Singles

== Other ==
- Lomb-Scargle periodogram
