= 2007 Bausch & Lomb Championships – Doubles =

Doubles
- 2007 Bausch & Lomb Championships

Final
- Champion: (Italy) Mara Santangelo (Slovenia) Katarina Srebotnik
- Runner-up: (Spain) Anabel Medina Garrigues (Spain) Virginia Ruano Pascual
- Score: 6–3, 7–6^{(7–4)}

Details
- Draw: 16 (1 WC )
- Seeds: 4

Events
Singles	Doubles
← 2006 ·	Amelia Island Championships	· 2008 →

Shinobu Asagoe and Katarina Srebotnik were the defending champions. Asagoe had retired in 2006.

Srebotnik partnered with Mara Santangelo, successfully defending her title. They beat the Spanish couple Anabel Medina Garrigues and Virginia Ruano Pascual in the final, 6–3, 7–6.

== Seeds ==
1. (Zimbabwe) Cara Black / (South Africa) Liezel Huber (semifinals)
2. (China) Yan Zi / (China) Zheng Jie (quarterfinals)
3. (Russia) Nadia Petrova / (United States) Lisa Raymond (quarterfinals)
4. (Spain) Anabel Medina Garrigues / (Spain) Virginia Ruano Pascual (final)

== Draw ==
=== Key ===
- Q = Qualifier
- WC = Wild card
- LL = Lucky loser
- Alt = Alternate
- SE = Special exempt
- PR = Protected ranking
- ITF = ITF entry
- JE = Junior exempt
- w/o = Walkover
- r = Retired
- d = Defaulted
- SR = Special ranking

First round
1	(Zimbabwe) C Black (South Africa) L Huber	6	6
(France) N Dechy (Croatia) J Kostanić Tošić	3	2
(Slovakia) J Gajdošová (Australia) R Stubbs	6	4	4
(Australia) A Molik (Australia) B Stewart	4	6	6
3	(Russia) N Petrova (United States) L Raymond	6	6
(United States) V King (China) T Sun	2	1
(Italy) M Santangelo (Slovenia) K Srebotnik	7	7^{10}
(Argentina) G Dulko (Italy) F Pennetta	5	6^{8}
(Russia) V Dushevina (Russia) E Vesnina	6	6
(France) M Bartoli (United States) M Tu	3	1
(Serbia) J Janković (United States) C Morariu	6^{5}	2
4	(Spain) A Medina Garrigues (Spain) V Ruano Pascual	7^{7}	6
(Slovakia) J Husárová (United States) M Shaughnessy	6	6
WC	(Netherlands) M Krajicek (Russia) G Voskoboeva	1	1
(Greece) E Daniilidou (Australia) N Pratt	1	6	4
2	(China) Yan Zi (China) Zheng Jie	6	2	6

Quarterfinals
1	(Zimbabwe) C Black (South Africa) L Huber	6	6
(Australia) A Molik (Australia) B Stewart	4	0
3	(Russia) N Petrova (United States) L Raymond	3	3
(Italy) M Santangelo (Slovenia) K Srebotnik	6	6
(Russia) V Dushevina (Russia) E Vesnina	3	1
4	(Spain) A Medina Garrigues (Spain) V Ruano Pascual	6	6
(Slovakia) J Husárová (United States) M Shaughnessy	6	6
2	(China) Yan Zi (China) Zheng Jie	2	2

Semifinals
1	(Zimbabwe) C Black (South Africa) L Huber	4	3
(Italy) M Santangelo (Slovenia) K Srebotnik	6	6
4	(Spain) A Medina Garrigues (Spain) V Ruano Pascual	6	7
(Slovakia) J Husárová (United States) M Shaughnessy	4	5

Final
(Italy) M Santangelo (Slovenia) K Srebotnik	6	7^{7}
4	(Spain) A Medina Garrigues (Spain) V Ruano Pascual	3	6^{4}
