= Ivanovic–Janković rivalry =

Tennis rivalry

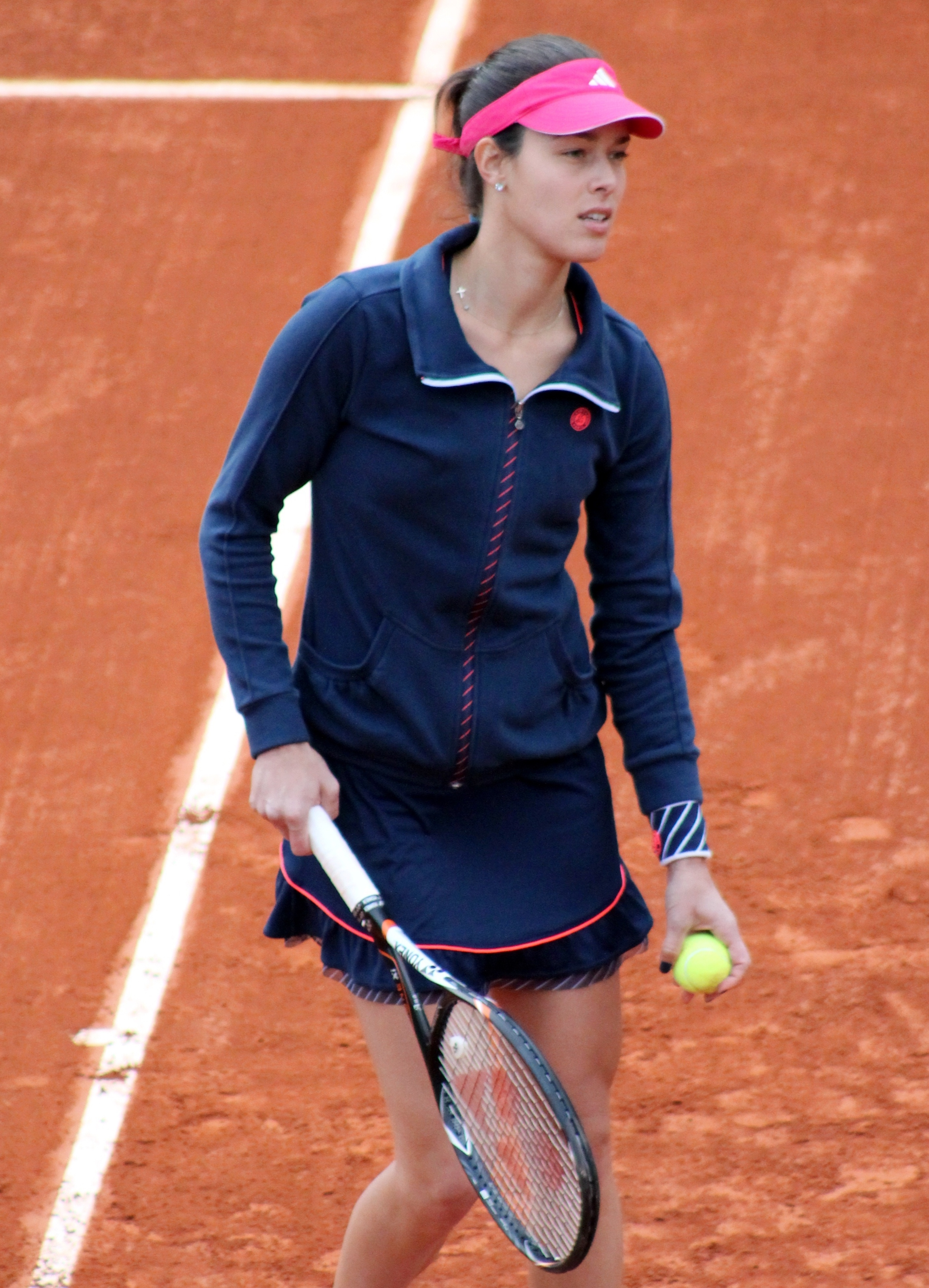
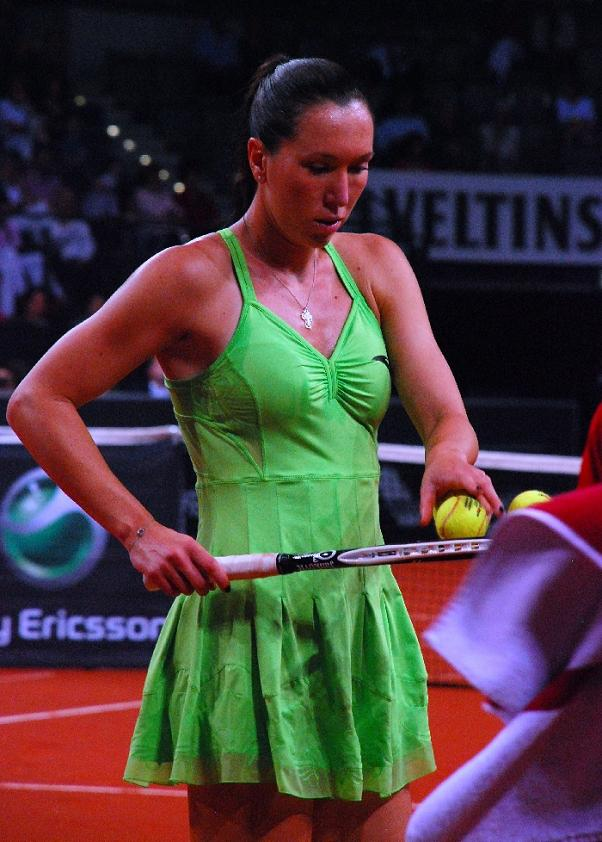
Ana Ivanovic (left) and Jelena Janković (right).

Serbian tennis players Ana Ivanovic and Jelena Janković are both former world No. 1 and met 12 times. Their overall head-to-head series is 9–3, in Ivanovic's favor. Janković is two years older than Ivanovic. They are the first female players to achieve major successes for independent Serbia.

== Head-to-head ==
Legend (2005–2008)	Legend (2009–present)	Ivanovic	Janković
Grand Slam	Grand Slam	2	0
WTA Tour Championships	WTA Finals	0	1
WTA Tier I	WTA Premier Mandatory	4	1
WTA Tier II	WTA Premier 5	2	1
WTA Tier III	WTA Premier	1	0
Total		9	3

Ivanovic–Janković (9–3)

No.	Year	Tournament	Tier	Surface	Round	Winner	Score	Ivanovic	Janković
1.	2005	Zurich Open	Tier I	Hard	Round of 16	Ivanovic	6–2, 6–1	1	0
2.	2006	LA Women's Tennis Championships	Tier II	Hard	Quarterfinals	Janković	6–4, 7–6^{(8–6)}	1	1
–	2006	Canadian Open	Tier I	Hard	Round of 16	Ivanovic	Walkover	1	1
3.	2007	Pan Pacific Open	Tier I	Carpet	Quarterfinals	Ivanovic	3–6, 6–4, 6–2	2	1
4.	2007	Amelia Island Championships	Tier II	Clay	Quarterfinals	Ivanovic	7–5, 6–3	3	1
5.	2007	LA Women's Tennis Championships	Tier II	Hard	Semifinals	Ivanovic	4–6, 6–3, 7–5	4	1
6.	2008	Indian Wells Masters	Tier I	Hard	Semifinals	Ivanovic	7–6^{(7–3)}, 6–3	5	1
7.	2008	Roland Garros	Grand Slam	Clay	Semifinals	Ivanovic	6–4, 3–6, 6–4	6	1
8.	2008	WTA Tour Championships	Tour Finals	Hard	Round Robin	Janković	6–3, 6–4	6	2
9.	2010	Madrid Open	Premier Mandatory	Clay	Round of 32	Janković	4–6, 6–4, 6–1	6	3
10.	2011	Indian Wells Masters	Premier Mandatory	Hard	Round of 16	Ivanovic	6–4, 6–2	7	3
11.	2013	Australian Open	Grand Slam	Hard	Round of 32	Ivanovic	7–5, 6–3	8	3
12.	2014	Stuttgart Open	Premier	Clay	Semifinals	Ivanovic	6–3, 7–5	9	3

== Breakdown of the rivalry ==
- Hard courts: Ivanovic, 5–2
- Clay courts: Ivanovic, 3–1
- Grass courts: None
- Carpet: Ivanovic, 1–0
- Grand Slam matches: Ivanovic, 2–0
- Grand Slam finals: None
- Year-End Championships matches: Jankovic, 1–0
- Year-End Championships finals: None
- Fed Cup matches: None (Both players are representing Serbia)
- Matches won after saving match points: Ivanovic, 1–0
- All finals: None

== History of matches ==
Ivanovic and Janković have played each other 12 times with Ivanovic having the advantage 9 to 3 in match wins. The pair played their first match against each other in an abandoned swimming pool used as a tennis court in Belgrade. A 9-year old Janković won the match, beating the 7-year old Ivanovic 7–1. When asked why Ivanovic has posed such a problem for herself, Janković remarked that she struggles to read Ivanovic's game mostly due to the fact Ivanovic likes to play short points. Ivanovic leads 2–1 on clay, 6–2 on hard courts and 1–0 on carpet courts.

=== 2005–2006: A little matches ===
In 2005 Ivanovic had her Grand Slam debut, and in her third appearance (in French Open) she reached her first slam quarterfinal. From the other side, two years older Jankovic had a little more experience at the moment and reached semifinal of the US Open in 2006. Also Ivanovic captured her first title and then second, which category is Tier I (now Premier Mandatory). Jankovic won her first title in 2004, but in 2005 and 2006 she didn't win any title, although she played four finals. In this period, when both players were rising stars, they met just two times with one victory for all. First match was in third round of Zurich in 2005, when 17-year-old Ivanovic trashed Jankovic with 6–2, 6–1 victory for place in quarterfinal. Match was finished in just 51 minutes. But in 2006 Los Angeles quarterfinal clash, Jankovic was winner with straight sets win, 6–4, 7–6, in an hour and 30 minutes battle. Although they should play their third match in Montreal, just a week later after Los Angeles, Ivanovic got walkover from Jankovic and then went on to win the title.

=== 2007–2008: Most matches ===
This two years were the best years of their careers. Both players were ranked No. 1 in 2008 and also they had their best grand slam results, with Ivanovic winning Roland Garros trophy, after reaching first two Grand Slam finals previously and Jankovic who got into her first Grand Slam final in New York and also reached 3 semi-finals previously. So, normally in this period they had most clashes. Total matches that they played then is 6, with three meetings in 2007 and another three in 2008. Ivanovic won first five matches of this six, although three of them gone into the third set. First match was in quarterfinal of Tokyo when Ivanovic triumphed after losing first set, 3–6, 6–4, 6–2. In 2006 Ivanovic won just one match after losing first set, but now won two back-to-back matches in that way, doing the same in previous round. Jankovic gave a big battle comparing to semifinal match against then World No. 1 Maria Sharapova, when Sharapova retried against Ivanovic, but after a first set blowout, 6–1. Next match was on Amelia Island, again quarterfinal, when Ivanovic won in two sets, 7–5, 6–3. But this match was just 15 minutes shorter than previous match in Tokyo, which was in three sets. Duration of this match shows that it was a big battle, although it were two sets. They met then for a second time in Los Angeles, after last year quarterfinal clash which Jankovic won. Ivanovic won, but now in three sets – 4–6, 6–3, 7–5. This was the longest match contested between the two. In a match lasting two and a half hours, Ivanovic recovered from a 4–1 third set deficit, saving two match points en route, to defeat Janković on her way to the title. It was their last match of 2007.

In 2008, their first match was in semifinals of Indian Wells. Ivanovic continued winning in their matches, with a straight set victory, 7–6, 6–3. The most significant match between the pair took place in the semi-finals of the French Open, with the winner having assured of becoming World No. 1 and with both women bidding to win their first Grand Slam title. Ivanovic won the match, recovering from a 3–1 final set deficit and also 4–3 deficit when Jankovic broke, to defeat Jankovic for the fifth consecutive time, 6–4, 3–6, 6–4. Ivanovic then won Roland Garros trophy. Jankovic's win at the 2008 WTA Tour Championships in Doha later that year snapped a 5 match losing streak against her compatriot. Their head-to-head record was then 6–2, in Ivanovic's favor.

=== 2009–2011: Least matches ===
After successful years, both players had decline in form. They had some good results, but they were not as constant as it was earlier. Ivanovic fall out of top 20 in 2009. Jankovic was on top, but not as good as in 2008. She reached one semifinal of Grand Slam but without beating top players. On other grand slams her best result was fourth round. So, followed with their results, especially Ivanovic's, they couldn't meet for a long time. In 2009 Ivanovic and Jankovic didn't meet anytime. But, after more than a year, they met again in second round of 2010 Mutua Madrilena Madrid Open. The situation was interesting, because Ivanovic was the first wildcard in WTA history to receive a bye in the first round as she had reached semifinals of Rome previous week. Jankovic did the same and they were drawn to play against each other automatically in the second round. Jankovic won for a second straight time with a three sets victory, 4–6, 6–4, 6–1, although Ivanovic had a set advantage and a break in second set. This was the lowest round, and still is, where Ivanovic and Jankovic played against each other. In 2011, they met for the second time in Indian Wells and Ivanovic won 6–4, 6–2 and got into quarterfinals. This was the first win for Ivanovic in their matches since 2008 Roland Garros semifinal.

=== 2013–2016 ===
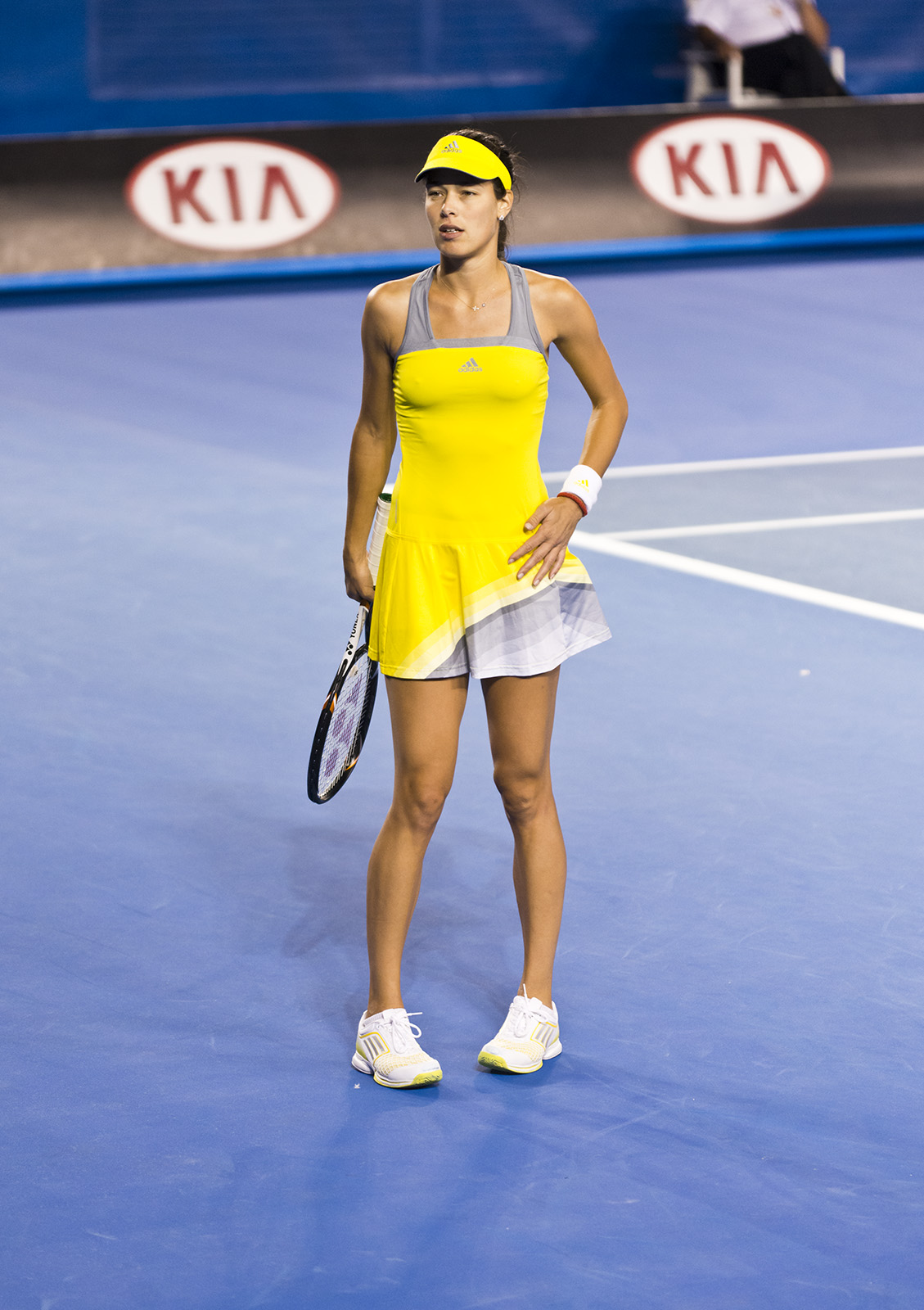
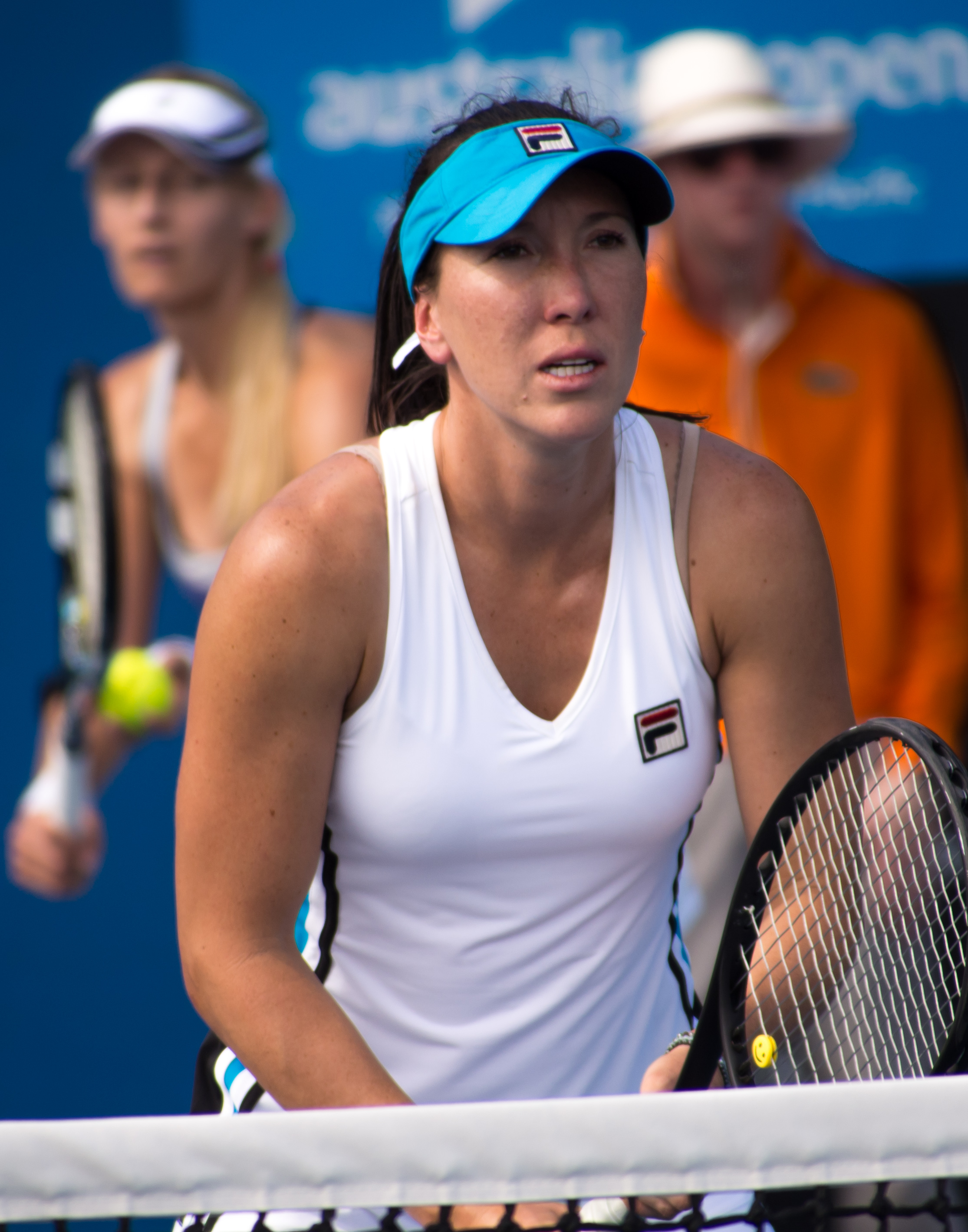
Ana Ivanovic (left) and Jelena Janković (right) at 2013 Australian Open where they had second Grand Slam meeting

Although they didn't meet in 2012, at the start of the 2013 they met at Australian Open. Ivanovic won match 7–5, 6–3. A little later in that year, Jankovic suddenly got back to top 10, after being ranked out of top 20 at start of the year. Ivanovic had a slower return to top, but the improvement in 2014 caused her return to top 10 for the first time since 2009. This improvement of both caused the meeting in semifinal for the first time since 2008. It was in 2014 Stuttgart, when Ivanovic won 6–3, 7–5 and improved to 9–3 in head-to-head. The rivalry ended in 2016, as the two went out of top 50. With Ivanovic retired from tennis in late 2016, Jankovic became the Serbian no. 1 female tennis player.

== Relationship ==
The relationship between pair has been strained. Both have openly admitted in the past to not liking each other and have been involved in a number of high-profile spats on and off court.

Ivanovic was criticized both by Janković and her mother after Ivanovic decided to withdraw from Serbia's Fed Cup World Group play-off tie against Slovakia, citing her poor form in 2010 which left Jankovic the only high-profile player to play the tie which Serbia lost 3–2. During the same weekend, Ivanovic was photographed having coffee with her then-boyfriend Adam Scott at the island resort of Palma, Majorca. Snezana Jankovic denounced Ivanovic in the Serbian press

Another high profile controversy was after the pair's first meeting in two years in the second round of the 2010 Mutua Madrilena Madrid Open in Madrid where the match was marred however by an incident in where off court cameras appeared to catch Janković mocking Ivanovic's trademark fistpumps towards her mother and camp after the match. Jankovic admitted she found Ivanovic's fistpumps "irritating" and but that it was not meant to be offensive and was in the heat of the moment.

After their match in Indian Wells in 2011 however, Ivanovic stated she felt there were no real issues with Janković and both agreed that they have both put the past behind them, an opinion echoed again by Jankovic after their Australian Open encounter in 2013.

== Grand Slam performance timeline comparison ==
=== Grand Slam tournaments ===
Key
**W**	F	SF	QF	#R	RR	Q#	P#	DNQ	A	Z#	PO	**G**	S	B	NMS	NTI	P	NH

(W) winner; (F) finalist; (SF) semifinalist; (QF) quarterfinalist; (#R) rounds 4, 3, 2, 1; (RR) round-robin stage; (Q#) qualification round; (P#) preliminary round; (DNQ) did not qualify; (A) absent; (Z#) Davis/Fed Cup Zonal Group (with number indication) or (PO) play-off; (G) gold, (S) silver or (B) bronze Olympic/Paralympic medal; (NMS) not a Masters tournament; (NTI) not a Tier I tournament; (P) postponed; (NH) not held; (SR) strike rate (events won / competed); (W–L) win–loss record.
To avoid confusion and double counting, these charts are updated at the conclusion of a tournament or when the player's participation has ended.
- **Bold** = players met during this tournament

==== By Year ====
===== 2004–2009 =====
Player	2004				2005				2006				2007				2008				2009			
Player	AUS	FRA	WIM	USA	AUS	FRA	WIM	USA	AUS	FRA	WIM	USA	AUS	FRA	WIM	USA	AUS	FRA	WIM	USA	AUS	FRA	WIM	USA
(Serbia) **Ana Ivanovic**	A	A	A	LQ	3R	QF	3R	2R	2R	3R	4R	3R	3R	F	SF	4R	F	**W**	3R	2R	3R	4R	4R	1R
(Serbia) **Jelena Janković**	2R	1R	1R	2R	2R	1R	3R	3R	2R	3R	4R	SF	4R	SF	4R	QF	SF	**SF**	4R	F	4R	4R	3R	2R

===== 2010–2016 =====
Player	2010				2011				2012				2013				2014				2015				2016			
Player	AUS	FRA	WIM	USA	AUS	FRA	WIM	USA	AUS	FRA	WIM	USA	AUS	FRA	WIM	USA	AUS	FRA	WIM	USA	AUS	FRA	WIM	USA	AUS	FRA	WIM	USA
(Serbia) **Ana Ivanovic**	2R	2R	1R	4R	1R	1R	3R	4R	4R	3R	4R	QF	**4R**	4R	2R	4R	QF	3R	3R	2R	1R	SF	2R	1R	3R	3R	1R	1R
(Serbia) **Jelena Janković**	3R	SF	4R	3R	2R	4R	1R	3R	4R	2R	1R	3R	**3R**	QF	2R	4R	4R	4R	1R	4R	1R	1R	4R	1R	2R	1R	2R	2R

== Combined singles performance timeline (best result) ==
This table contains best result of either Jankovic or Ivanovic at Grand Slams.

Grand Slam Tournament	2002	2003	2004	2005	2006	2007	2008	2009	2010	2011	2012	2013	2014	2015	2016
Australian Open	A	2R	2R	3R	2R	4R	**F**	4R	3R	2R	4R	4R	QF	1R	3R
French Open	A	A	1R	QF	3R	**F**	**W^{(I)}**	4R	SF	4R	3R	QF	4R	SF	3R
Wimbledon	A	LQ	1R	3R	4R	SF	4R	4R	4R	3R	4R	2R	3R	4R	2R
US Open	LQ	LQ	2R	3R	SF	QF	F	3R	4R	4R	QF	4R	4R	1R	2R

- Grand slams where both players reached at least quarterfinal are in bold font.
- Grand slams where both players met each other are in italic font.

== Year-end WTA ranking timeline ==
Player	2001	2002	2003	2004	2005	2006	2007	2008	2009	2010	2011	2012	2013	2014	2015	2016
(Serbia) Ana Ivanovic			705	97	16	14	4	5	22	17	22	13	16	5	16	65
(Serbia) Jelena Janković	361	194	85	28	22	12	3	**1**	8	8	14	22	8	16	21	55
