= 2006 Bausch & Lomb Championships – Doubles =

Doubles
- 2006 Bausch & Lomb Championships

Final
- Champions: (Japan) Shinobu Asagoe (Slovenia) Katarina Srebotnik
- Runners-up: (South Africa) Liezel Huber (India) Sania Mirza
- Score: 6–2, 6–4

Details
- Draw: 16 (1 Q / 2 WC )
- Seeds: 4

Events
Singles	Doubles
← 2005 ·	Amelia Island Championships	· 2007 →

The women's doubles Tournament at the 2006 Bausch & Lomb Championships took place between 3 April and 9 April on outdoor green clay courts in Amelia Island, Florida, USA. Shinobu Asagoe and Katarina Srebotnik won the title, defeating Liezel Huber and Sania Mirza in the final.

== Seeds ==
1. (United States) Lisa Raymond / (Australia) Samantha Stosur (first round)
2. (Spain) Virginia Ruano Pascual / (United States) Meghann Shaughnessy (semifinals)
3. (Russia) Svetlana Kuznetsova / (Russia) Elena Likhovtseva (first round)
4. (United States) Corina Morariu / (Australia) Rennae Stubbs (first round)

== Main draw ==
=== Key ===
- Q = Qualifier
- WC = Wild card
- LL = Lucky loser
- Alt = Alternate
- SE = Special exempt
- PR = Protected ranking
- ITF = ITF entry
- JE = Junior exempt
- w/o = Walkover
- r = Retired
- d = Defaulted
- SR = Special ranking

First round
1	(United States) L Raymond (Australia) S Stosur	7^{9}	6^{2}	2
WC	(France) M Bartoli (France) N Dechy	6^{7}	7^{7}	6
(Czech Republic) K Peschke (Italy) F Schiavone	7^{7}	6
(United States) J Russell (Italy) A S Zanetti	6^{3}	3
3	(Russia) S Kuznetsova (Russia) E Likhovtseva	6	6^{2}	2
(Japan) S Asagoe (Slovenia) K Srebotnik	4	7^{7}	6
(United States) M Tu (Russia) V Zvonareva	6	1	4
(Germany) A-L Grönefeld (Russia) N Petrova	2	6	6
(South Africa) L Huber (India) S Mirza	7^{9}	6^{6}	6
(Spain) L D Lino (Spain) A M Garrigues	6^{7}	7^{8}	3
(Australia) N Pratt (Australia) B Stewart	7^{7}	7^{22}
4	(United States) C Morariu (Australia) R Stubbs	6^{5}	6^{20}
Q	(Russia) D Safina (Russia) E Vesnina	6	6
(Argentina) G Dulko (Italy) F Pennetta	2	2
WC	(Russia) V Dushevina (Netherlands) M Krajicek	2	2
2	(Spain) V R Pascual (United States) M Shaughnessy	6	6

Quarterfinals
WC	(France) M Bartoli (France) N Dechy	4	4
(Czech Republic) K Peschke (Italy) F Schiavone	6	6
(Japan) S Asagoe (Slovenia) K Srebotnik	6	6
(Germany) A-L Grönefeld (Russia) N Petrova	2	2
(South Africa) L Huber (India) S Mirza	6	6
(Australia) N Pratt (Australia) B Stewart	2	3
Q	(Russia) D Safina (Russia) E Vesnina	1	2
2	(Spain) V R Pascual (United States) M Shaughnessy	6	6

Semifinals
(Czech Republic) K Peschke (Italy) F Schiavone	7^{7}	4	r
(Japan) S Asagoe (Slovenia) K Srebotnik	6^{2}	6
(South Africa) L Huber (India) S Mirza	6	6
2	(Spain) V R Pascual (United States) M Shaughnessy	4	4

Finals
(Japan) S Asagoe (Slovenia) K Srebotnik	6	6
(South Africa) L Huber (India) S Mirza	2	4

== Qualification draw ==
=== Key ===
- Q = Qualifier
- WC = Wild card
- LL = Lucky loser
- Alt = Alternate
- SE = Special exempt
- PR = Protected ranking
- ITF = ITF entry
- JE = Junior exempt
- w/o = Walkover
- r = Retired
- d = Defaulted
- SR = Special ranking

First round			Finals
1	(Italy) M E Camerin (Israel) S Pe'er	86
WC	(United States) N Uberoi (India) S Uberoi		1	(Italy) M E Camerin (Israel) S Pe'er	1	3
	(Poland) M Domachowska (Italy) R Vinci		2	(Russia) D Safina (Russia) E Vesnina	6	6
2	(Russia) D Safina (Russia) E Vesnina	84
