= 2006 Bausch & Lomb Championships =

Women's tennis tournament in Florida, US

- Date: April 3 – 9
- Edition: 27th
- Category: Tier II
- Draw: 56S / 16D
- Surface: Clay / outdoor
- Location: Amelia Island, Florida, U.S
- Venue: Amelia Island Plantation

Champions

Singles
- (Russia) Nadia Petrova

Doubles
- (Japan) Shinobu Asagoe (Slovenia) Katarina Srebotnik
← 2005 ·	Amelia Island Championships	· 2007 →

The 2006 Bausch & Lomb Championships was the 27th edition of that women's tennis tournament and was played on outdoor clay courts. The tournament was classified as a Tier II event on the 2006 WTA Tour. The event took place at the Racquet Park at the Amelia Island Plantation, in Amelia Island, Florida, U.S. from April 3 through April 9, 2006. First-seeded Nadia Petrova won the singles title.

== Finals ==
=== Singles ===
(Russia) Nadia Petrova defeated (Italy) Francesca Schiavone, 6–4, 6–4

- It was Petrova's 2nd title of the year and the 3rd of her career

=== Doubles ===
(Japan) Shinobu Asagoe / (Slovenia) Katarina Srebotnik defeated (South Africa) Liezel Huber / (India) Sania Mirza, 6–2, 6–4
