= 2006 Bausch & Lomb Championships – Singles =

Singles
- 2006 Bausch & Lomb Championships

Final
- Champion: (Russia) Nadia Petrova
- Runner-up: (Italy) Francesca Schiavone
- Score: 6–4, 6–4

Details
- Draw: 56 (8 Q / 4 WC )
- Seeds: 16

Events
Singles	Doubles
- Amelia Island Championships

Lindsay Davenport was the defending champion, but could not participate due to a back injury.

Nadia Petrova won the title, defeating Francesca Schiavone 6–4, 6–4 in the championships match.

== Seeds ==
The top eight seeds received a bye into the second round.

1. (Russia) Nadia Petrova (champion)
2. (Switzerland) Patty Schnyder (quarterfinals)
3. (Italy) Francesca Schiavone (finals)
4. (Czech Republic) Nicole Vaidišová (third round)
5. (Russia) Svetlana Kuznetsova (semifinals)
6. (Russia) Elena Likhovtseva (second round)
7. (Germany) Anna-Lena Grönefeld (quarterfinals)
8. (Italy) Flavia Pennetta (second round)
9. (Russia) Dinara Safina (third round)
10. (France) Nathalie Dechy (first round)
11. (Spain) Anabel Medina Garrigues (third round)
12. (Serbia and Montenegro) Jelena Janković (first round)
13. (Argentina) Gisela Dulko (first round)
14. (Slovenia) Katarina Srebotnik (second round)
15. (Czech Republic) Lucie Šafářová (semifinals)
16. (France) Marion Bartoli (first round)

== Draw ==
Key

- Q = Qualifier
- WC = Wild card
- LL = Lucky loser
- Alt = Alternate
- ITF = ITF entry
- PR = Protected ranking
- SR = Special ranking
- SE = Special exempt
- JE = Junior exempt
- JR = Junior Accelerator Programme entrant
- CO = College Accelerator Programme entrant
- NG = Next Gen Accelerator Program entrant
- w/o = Walkover
- r = Retired
- d = Defaulted

=== Finals ===
Quarterfinals
1	(Russia) Nadia Petrova	6	6
Q	(Spain) Virginia Ruano Pascual	3	0
15	(Czech Republic) Lucie Šafářová	6	6
(United States) Jill Craybas	2	2
7	(Germany) Anna-Lena Grönefeld	2	3
3	(Italy) Francesca Schiavone	6	6
5	(Russia) Svetlana Kuznetsova	6	6
2	(Switzerland) Patty Schnyder	3	1

Semifinals
1	(Russia) Nadia Petrova	6	6
15	(Czech Republic) Lucie Šafářová	3	2
3	(Italy) Francesca Schiavone	7	3
5	(Russia) Svetlana Kuznetsova	6^{2}	2^{r}

Final
1	(Russia) Nadia Petrova	6	6
3	(Italy) Francesca Schiavone	4	4

=== Top half ===
==== Section 1 ====
First round
(United States) A Frazier	1	5
WC	(Czech Republic) K Böhmová	6	7
(Austria) S Bammer	3	1
(Australia) S Stosur	6	6
WC	(United States) M Shaughnessy	6	7
16	(France) M Bartoli	0	5
10	(France) N Dechy	6^{2}	4
Q	(Spain) V Ruano Pascual	7	6
(Italy) An Serra Zanetti	6	6
Q	(Venezuela) M Sequera	2	4
(Russia) E Vesnina	7	3	6
(France) V Razzano	5	6	3

Second round
1	(Russia) N Petrova	6	6^{6}	6
WC	(Czech Republic) K Böhmová	1	7	3
(Australia) S Stosur	5	4
WC	(United States) M Shaughnessy	7	6
Q	(Spain) V Ruano Pascual	6	6
(Italy) An Serra Zanetti	4	1
(Russia) E Vesnina	6	6
8	(Italy) F Pennetta	2	1

Third round
1	(Russia) N Petrova	6	6
WC	(United States) M Shaughnessy	1	3
Q	(Spain) V Ruano Pascual	6	3	6
(Russia) E Vesnina	4	6	4

Quarterfinals
1	(Russia) N Petrova	6	6
Q	(Spain) V Ruano Pascual	3	0

==== Section 2 ====
First round
Q	(Spain) L Pous Tió	6	5	6
Q	(Ukraine) K Bondarenko	4	7	3
(Italy) R Vinci	3	2
(Italy) M Santangelo	6	6
(Netherlands) M Krajicek	5	7	4
15	(Czech Republic) L Šafářová	7	6^{2}	6
12	(Serbia and Montenegro) J Janković	6	6^{8}	0^{r}
(United States) J Craybas	2	7	4
(Croatia) K Šprem	6	4	6
WC	(United States) M Washington	3	6	4
Q	(Slovakia) M Suchá	2	6	3
(Germany) J Schruff	6	3	6

Second round
4	(Czech Republic) N Vaidišová	6	6
Q	(Spain) L Pous Tió	4	4
(Italy) M Santangelo	4	6	3
15	(Czech Republic) L Šafářová	6	1	6
(United States) J Craybas	6^{2}	6	6
(Croatia) K Šprem	7	4	1
(Germany) J Schruff	6	6
6	(Russia) E Likhovtseva	4	4

Third round
4	(Czech Republic) N Vaidišová	1	6	4
15	(Czech Republic) L Šafářová	6	4	6
(United States) J Craybas	6	6
(Germany) J Schruff	3	2

Quarterfinals
15	(Czech Republic) L Šafářová	6	6
(United States) J Craybas	2	2

=== Bottom half ===
==== Section 3 ====
First round
(Russia) V Zvonareva	6	6
(Argentina) M Díaz Oliva	3	0
WC	(Puerto Rico) K Brandi	1	0
(Israel) S Pe'er	6	6
(Japan) S Asagoe	2	2
9	(Russia) D Safina	6	6
14	(Slovenia) K Srebotnik	6	6
(Colombia) C Castaño	4	2
(Poland) M Domachowska	3	5
(Italy) ME Camerin	6	7
Q	(Spain) C Martínez Granados	2	6	6
(China) S Peng	6	4	4

Second round
7	(Germany) A-L Grönefeld	6	6
(Russia) V Zvonareva	3	4
(Israel) S Pe'er	2	0
9	(Russia) D Safina	6	6
14	(Slovenia) K Srebotnik	4	3
(Italy) ME Camerin	6	6
Q	(Spain) C Martínez Granados	4	1
3	(Italy) F Schiavone	6	6

Third round
7	(Germany) A-L Grönefeld	6	6^{4}	6
9	(Russia) D Safina	4	7	3
(Italy) ME Camerin	1	3
3	(Italy) F Schiavone	6	6

Quarterfinals
7	(Germany) A-L Grönefeld	2	3
3	(Italy) F Schiavone	6	6

==== Section 4 ====
First round
(Sweden) S Arvidsson	7	6
(United States) L Granville	6^{5}	2
(Czech Republic) K Peschke	7	2	2
Q	(Ukraine) O Savchuk	5	6	6
Q	(Spain) L Domínguez Lino	3	6	5
11	(Spain) A Medina Garrigues	6	2	7
13	(Argentina) G Dulko	0	1
LL	(Ukraine) A Bondarenko	6	6
(Russia) V Dushevina	6	6
(Russia) E Bychkova	2	1
(India) S Mirza	3	4
(United States) L Raymond	6	6

Second round
5	(Russia) S Kuznetsova	6	5	6
(Sweden) S Arvidsson	1	7	2
Q	(Ukraine) O Savchuk	1	5
11	(Spain) A Medina Garrigues	6	7
LL	(Ukraine) A Bondarenko	1	4
(Russia) V Dushevina	6	6
(United States) L Raymond	2	2
2	(Switzerland) P Schnyder	6	6

Third round
5	(Russia) S Kuznetsova	6	6
11	(Spain) A Medina Garrigues	3	4
(Russia) V Dushevina	3	5
2	(Switzerland) P Schnyder	6	7

Quarterfinals
5	(Russia) S Kuznetsova	6	6
2	(Switzerland) P Schnyder	3	1
