= 2007 Bausch & Lomb Championships =

- Date: April 2–8
- Edition: 28th
- Category: Tier II
- Draw: 56S / 16D
- Surface: Clay / outdoor
- Location: Amelia Island, Florida, U.S.
- Venue: Amelia Island Plantation

Champions

Singles
- (France) Tatiana Golovin

Doubles
- (Italy) Mara Santangelo (Slovenia) Katarina Srebotnik
← 2006 ·	Amelia Island Championships	· 2008 →

The 2007 Bausch & Lomb Championships was the 28th edition of that tennis tournament and was played on outdoor clay courts. The tournament was classified as a Tier II event on the 2007 WTA Tour. The event took place at the Racquet Park at the Amelia Island Plantation, in Amelia Island, Florida, U.S. from April 2 through April 8, 2007. Tatiana Golovin won the singles title.

== Finals ==
=== Singles ===
(France) Tatiana Golovin defeated (Russia) Nadia Petrova, 6–2, 6–1

- It was Golovin's first career title.

=== Doubles ===
(Italy) Mara Santangelo / (Slovenia) Katarina Srebotnik defeated (Spain) Anabel Medina Garrigues / (Spain) Virginia Ruano Pascual, 6–3, 7–6^{(7–4)}
