= 2008 Bausch & Lomb Championships – Singles =

Singles
- 2008 Bausch & Lomb Championships

Final
- Champion: (Russia) Maria Sharapova
- Runner-up: (Slovakia) Dominika Cibulková
- Score: 7–6^{(9–7)}, 6–3

Details
- Draw: 56 (8 Q / 3 WC )
- Seeds: 16

Events
Singles	Doubles
- Amelia Island Championships

Tatiana Golovin was the defending champion, but withdrew from the tournament with injury.

Maria Sharapova won the title, defeating Dominika Cibulková in the final 7–6^{(9–7)}, 6–3. This was Sharapova's 19th career title, but her first title on clay, after seven years on the WTA tour.

== Seeds ==
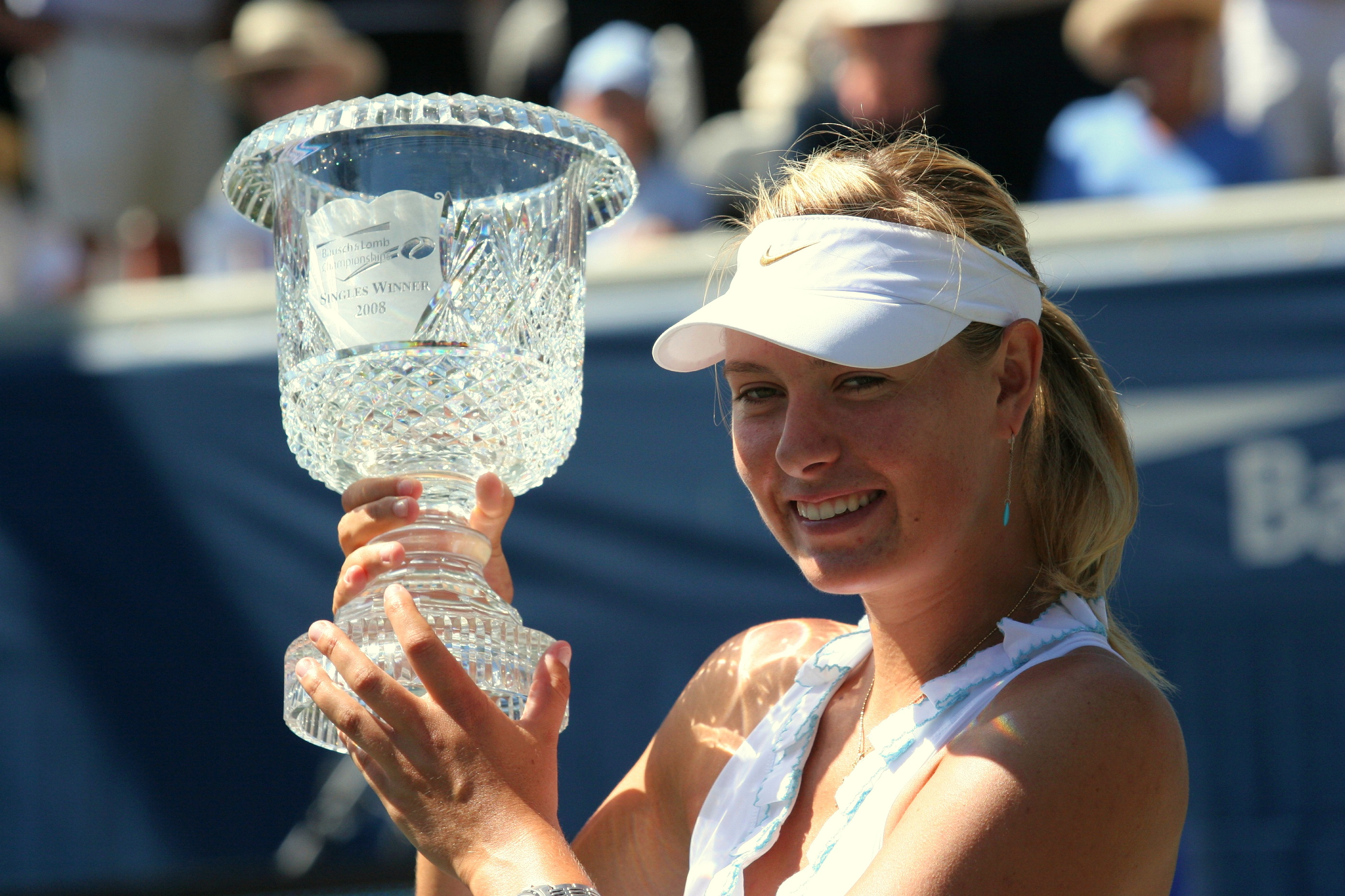
Maria Sharapova with the winner's trophy

The top 8 seeds receive a bye into the second round.

1. (Russia) Maria Sharapova (champion)
2. (Russia) Anna Chakvetadze (third round)
3. (Slovakia) Daniela Hantuchová (second round)
4. (France) Marion Bartoli (second round)
5. (Switzerland) Patty Schnyder (second round)
6. (Russia) Dinara Safina (third round)
7. (Poland) Agnieszka Radwańska (third round)
8. (Hungary) Ágnes Szávay (quarterfinals)
9. (Austria) Sybille Bammer (second round)
10. (Ukraine) Alona Bondarenko (quarterfinals)
11. (France) Amélie Mauresmo (quarterfinals)
12. (Slovenia) Katarina Srebotnik (third round)
13. (France) Virginie Razzano (quarterfinals)
14. (Belarus) Victoria Azarenka (second round)
15. (Spain) Anabel Medina Garrigues (third round)
16. (United States) Lindsay Davenport (semifinals)

== Draw ==
=== Key ===
- Q = Qualifier
- WC = Wild card
- LL = Lucky loser
- w/o = Walkover
- r = Retired

=== Finals ===
Quarterfinals
1	(Russia) Maria Sharapova	6^{9}	6	6
10	(Ukraine) Alona Bondarenko	7^{11}	3	2
16	(United States) Lindsay Davenport	6	7^{7}
8	(Hungary) Ágnes Szávay	4	6^{3}
(France) Alizé Cornet	6	6
13	(France) Virginie Razzano	4	2
11	(France) Amélie Mauresmo	1	6^{6}
(Slovakia) Dominika Cibulková	6	7^{8}

Semifinals
1	(Russia) Maria Sharapova	w/o
16	(United States) Lindsay Davenport
(France) Alizé Cornet	2	6	4
(Slovakia) Dominika Cibulková	6	2	6

Finals
1	(Russia) Maria Sharapova	7^{9}	6
(Slovakia) Dominika Cibulková	6^{7}	3

=== Top half ===
==== Section 1 ====
First round
Q	(Czech Republic) B Záhlavová-Strýcová	6	6
(Switzerland) T Bacsinszky	2	4
Q	(Hungary) M Czink	7	6
(Australia) C Dellacqua	5	2
(Argentina) ME Salerni	4	3
15	(Spain) A Medina Garrigues	6	6
10	(Ukraine) A Bondarenko	6	6
(Spain) N Llagostera Vives	2	0
(Denmark) C Wozniacki	6	6
(France) P Parmentier	3	1
(Ukraine) T Perebiynis	6	7
(China) S Peng	4	5

Second round
1	(Russia) M Sharapova	6	6
Q	(Czech Republic) B Záhlavová-Strýcová	1	3
Q	(Hungary) M Czink	6	3	4
15	(Spain) A Medina Garrigues	3	6	6
10	(Ukraine) A Bondarenko	6	3	6
(Denmark) C Wozniacki	3	6	3
(Ukraine) T Perebiynis	3	3
6	(Russia) D Safina	6	6

Third round
1	(Russia) M Sharapova	7^{7}	5	7^{7}
15	(Spain) A Medina Garrigues	6^{3}	7	6^{1}
10	(Ukraine) A Bondarenko	7^{7}	0	7
6	(Russia) D Safina	6^{5}	6	5

Quarterfinals
1	(Russia) M Sharapova	6^{9}	6	6
10	(Ukraine) A Bondarenko	7^{11}	3	2

==== Section 2 ====
First round
Q	(Croatia) K Šprem	6	7^{7}
(Japan) A Sugiyama	4	6^{3}
(Uzbekistan) A Amanmuradova	6^{1}	6^{4}
(United States) J Craybas	7^{7}	7^{7}
WC	(United States) V King	2	3
16	(United States) L Davenport	6	6
12	(Slovenia) K Srebotnik	6	6
(Chinese Taipei) Y-J Chan	4	0
(Thailand) T Tanasugarn	1	3
(Czech Republic) L Šafářová	6	6
(France) A Rezaï	2	6	5
(Russia) E Makarova	6	2	7

Second round
3	(Slovakia) D Hantuchová	3	6	3
Q	(Croatia) K Šprem	6	1	6
(United States) J Craybas	1	4
16	(United States) L Davenport	6	6
12	(Slovenia) K Srebotnik	6	6
(Czech Republic) L Šafářová	2	4
(Russia) E Makarova	4	1
8	(Hungary) Á Szávay	6	6

Third round
Q	(Croatia) K Šprem	4	6	4
16	(United States) L Davenport	6	3	6
12	(Slovenia) K Srebotnik	6	2	3
8	(Hungary) Á Szávay	3	6	6

Quarterfinals
16	(United States) L Davenport	6	7^{7}
8	(Hungary) Á Szávay	4	6^{3}

=== Bottom half ===
==== Section 3 ====
First round
(Venezuela) M Sequera	6^{1}	0
(Russia) E Vesnina	7^{7}	6
(Netherlands) M Krajicek	2	1
(France) A Cornet	6	6
WC	(Belarus) A Orlik	3	6^{2}
9	(Austria) S Bammer	6	7^{7}
13	(France) V Razzano	6	6
Q	(Ukraine) Y Fedak	2	1
(United States) M Shaughnessy	2	2
(Poland) M Domachowska	6	6
(Spain) V Ruano Pascual	3	3
(Belarus) O Govortsova	6	6

Second round
5	(Switzerland) P Schnyder	2	6	2
(Russia) E Vesnina	6	2	6
(France) A Cornet	6	6
9	(Austria) S Bammer	1	3
13	(France) V Razzano	6	2	7^{7}
(Poland) M Domachowska	3	6	6^{4}
(Belarus) O Govortsova	4	6	6
4	(France) M Bartoli	6	2	4

Third round
(Russia) E Vesnina	1	5
(France) A Cornet	6	7
13	(France) V Razzano	6	6
(Belarus) O Govortsova	2	4

Quarterfinals
(France) A Cornet	6	6
13	(France) V Razzano	4	2

==== Section 4 ====
First round
(Argentina) G Dulko	7	6
(Romania) E Gallovits	5	2
Q	(United States) B Mattek	3	6	4
WC	(Romania) S Cîrstea	6	2	6
Q	(Ukraine) O Savchuk	0	5
11	(France) A Mauresmo	6	7
14	(Belarus) V Azarenka	3	7	6
(Italy) S Errani	6	5	4
Q	(Russia) A Rodionova	3	5
(Slovakia) D Cibulková	6	7
(France) N Dechy	4	3
Q	(Japan) A Morita	6	6

Second round
7	(Poland) A Radwańska	6	1	7^{7}
(Argentina) G Dulko	2	6	6^{1}
WC	(Romania) S Cîrstea	5	1
11	(France) A Mauresmo	7	6
14	(Belarus) V Azarenka	5	6	2
(Slovakia) D Cibulková	7	4	6
Q	(Japan) A Morita	3	1
2	(Russia) A Chakvetadze	6	6

Third round
7	(Poland) A Radwańska	6	5	6^{6}
11	(France) A Mauresmo	3	7	7^{8}
(Slovakia) D Cibulková	6	3	6
2	(Russia) A Chakvetadze	2	6	1

Quarterfinals
11	(France) A Mauresmo	1	6^{6}
(Slovakia) D Cibulková	6	7^{8}
