= 2007 Bausch & Lomb Championships – Singles =

Singles
- 2007 Bausch & Lomb Championships

Final
- Champion: (France) Tatiana Golovin
- Runner-up: (Russia) Nadia Petrova
- Score: 6–2, 6–1

Details
- Draw: 56 (8 Q / 4 WC )
- Seeds: 16

Events
Singles	Doubles
- Amelia Island Championships

Nadia Petrova was the defending champion but lost in the final to Tatiana Golovin. It was her first WTA Tour singles title.

== Seeds ==
The top eight seeds received a bye into the second round.

1. (Russia) Nadia Petrova (final)
2. (Serbia) Jelena Janković (quarterfinals)
3. (Slovakia) Daniela Hantuchová (quarterfinals)
4. (Switzerland) Patty Schnyder (second round)
5. (Russia) Dinara Safina (quarterfinals)
6. (Serbia) Ana Ivanovic (semifinals)
7. (China) Li Na (second round)
8. (France) Tatiana Golovin (champion)
9. (Russia) Vera Zvonareva (withdrew due to upper respiratory illness)
10. (France) Marion Bartoli (first round)
11. (Slovenia) Katarina Srebotnik (third round)
12. (Australia) Samantha Stosur (third round)
13. (Austria) Sybille Bammer (semifinals)
14. (Spain) Anabel Medina Garrigues (first round)
15. (China) Zheng Jie (third round)
16. (Ukraine) Alona Bondarenko (third round)
17. (Germany) Martina Müller (second round)

== Draw ==
Key

- Q = Qualifier
- WC = Wild card
- LL = Lucky loser
- Alt = Alternate
- ITF = ITF entry
- PR = Protected ranking
- SR = Special ranking
- SE = Special exempt
- JE = Junior exempt
- JR = Junior Accelerator Programme entrant
- CO = College Accelerator Programme entrant
- NG = Next Gen Accelerator Program entrant
- w/o = Walkover
- r = Retired
- d = Defaulted

=== Finals ===
Quarterfinals
1	(Russia) Nadia Petrova	6	7
5	(Russia) Dinara Safina	4	5
3	(Slovakia) Daniela Hantuchová	6	2	2
13	(Austria) Sybille Bammer	2	6	6
8	(France) Tatiana Golovin	6	6
(United States) Venus Williams	2	3
6	(Serbia) Ana Ivanovic	7	6
2	(Serbia) Jelena Janković	5	3

Semifinals
1	(Russia) Nadia Petrova	7^{7}	6
13	(Austria) Sybille Bammer	6^{4}	1
8	(France) Tatiana Golovin	6	3	6
6	(Serbia) Ana Ivanovic	4	6	4

Final
1	(Russia) Nadia Petrova	2	1
8	(France) Tatiana Golovin	6	6

=== Top half ===
==== Section 1 ====
First round
Q	(Ukraine) K Bondarenko	6	1	1
(Estonia) K Kanepi	1	6	6
(Spain) L Domínguez Lino	7	3	4
(Italy) M Santangelo	5	6	6
WC	(Australia) A Molik	4	2
15	(China) J Zheng	6	6
11	(Slovenia) K Srebotnik	7^{8}	6
(United States) J Craybas	6^{6}	1
Q	(Germany) J Schruff	6	3	3
Q	(Ukraine) J Vakulenko	2	6	6
(Netherlands) M Krajicek	6^{6}	6	6
LL	(China) T Sun	7^{8}	4	4

Second round
1	(Russia) N Petrova	6	6
(Estonia) K Kanepi	4	0
(Italy) M Santangelo	3	3
15	(China) J Zheng	6	6
11	(Slovenia) K Srebotnik	2	6	6
Q	(Ukraine) J Vakulenko	6	3	2
(Netherlands) M Krajicek	4	5
5	(Russia) D Safina	6	7

Third round
1	(Russia) N Petrova	6	6
15	(China) J Zheng	2	3
11	(Slovenia) K Srebotnik	3	1
5	(Russia) D Safina	6	6

Quarterfinals
1	(Russia) N Petrova	6	7
5	(Russia) D Safina	4	5

==== Section 2 ====
First round
(Spain) N Llagostera Vives	6	6
(Russia) V Bardina	2	2
Q	(Russia) V Dushevina	6	7
(Australia) N Pratt	1	5
WC	(Slovakia) D Cibulková	7^{7}	6
14	(Spain) A Medina Garrigues	6^{4}	2
13	(Austria) S Bammer	6	6
(Thailand) T Tanasugarn	3	1
(France) V Razzano	6	6
WC	(United States) V King	3	4
(United States) M Shaughnessy	4	6^{5}
Q	(Croatia) K Šprem	6	7^{7}

Second round
3	(Slovakia) D Hantuchová	6	6
(Spain) N Llagostera Vives	1	3
Q	(Russia) V Dushevina	1	3
WC	(Slovakia) D Cibulková	6	6
13	(Austria) S Bammer	6	6
(France) V Razzano	1	1
Q	(Croatia) K Šprem	6	6
7	(China) N Li	3	3

Third round
3	(Slovakia) D Hantuchová	6	6
WC	(Slovakia) D Cibulková	1	4
13	(Austria) S Bammer	6	6
Q	(Croatia) K Šprem	2	3

Quarterfinals
3	(Slovakia) D Hantuchová	6	2	2
13	(Austria) S Bammer	2	6	6

=== Bottom half ===
==== Section 3 ====
First round
(Colombia) C Castaño	5	6	6
(Russia) E Vesnina	7	3	1
(Belarus) V Azarenka	1	1
(Italy) R Oprandi	6	6
Q	(Spain) V Ruano Pascual	5	1
12	(Australia) S Stosur	7	6
17	(Germany) M Müller	7	6
WC	(United States) A Harkleroad	5	1
(United States) M Tu	7	6
(Italy) F Pennetta	5	1
(France) A Rezaï	1	2
(United States) V Williams	6	6

Second round
8	(France) T Golovin	6	6
(Colombia) C Castaño	0	3
(Italy) R Oprandi	6^{6}	2
12	(Australia) S Stosur	7^{8}	6
17	(Germany) M Müller	3	1
(United States) M Tu	6	6
(United States) V Williams	3	6	6
4	(Switzerland) P Schnyder	6	3	4

Third round
8	(France) T Golovin	6	6
12	(Australia) S Stosur	2	1
(United States) M Tu	2	5
(United States) V Williams	6	7

Quarterfinals
8	(France) T Golovin	6	6
(United States) V Williams	2	3

==== Section 4 ====
First round
(China) S Peng	6	6
(Czech Republic) E Birnerová	2	1
(France) N Dechy	6	6
(Japan) A Nakamura	2	1
(Greece) E Daniilidou	6	6
10	(France) M Bartoli	0	4
16	(Ukraine) A Bondarenko	6	6
(Argentina) G Dulko	2	3
Q	(Russia) Y Shvedova	6	3
(France) S Brémond	2	1	r
Q	(Czech Republic) I Benešová	6	7^{7}
(Japan) A Morigami	1	6^{4}

Second round
6	(Serbia) A Ivanovic	1	6	6
(China) S Peng	6	4	3
(France) N Dechy	6	6
(Greece) E Daniilidou	3	4
16	(Ukraine) A Bondarenko	5	6	6
Q	(Russia) Y Shvedova	7	3	2
Q	(Czech Republic) I Benešová	1	2
2	(Serbia) J Janković	6	6

Third round
6	(Serbia) A Ivanovic	6	6
(France) N Dechy	1	1
16	(Ukraine) A Bondarenko	2	0
2	(Serbia) J Janković	6	6

Quarterfinals
6	(Serbia) A Ivanovic	7	6
2	(Serbia) J Janković	5	3
