= 2008 Bausch & Lomb Championships =

Women's tennis tournament

- Date: April 7–13
- Edition: 29th
- Category: Tier II
- Draw: 56S / 16D
- Prize money: $600,000
- Surface: Clay / outdoor
- Location: Amelia Island, Florida, U.S.
- Venue: Amelia Island Plantation

Champions

Singles
- (Russia) Maria Sharapova

Doubles
- (United States) Bethanie Mattek (Czech Republic) Vladimíra Uhlířová
- Amelia Island Championships

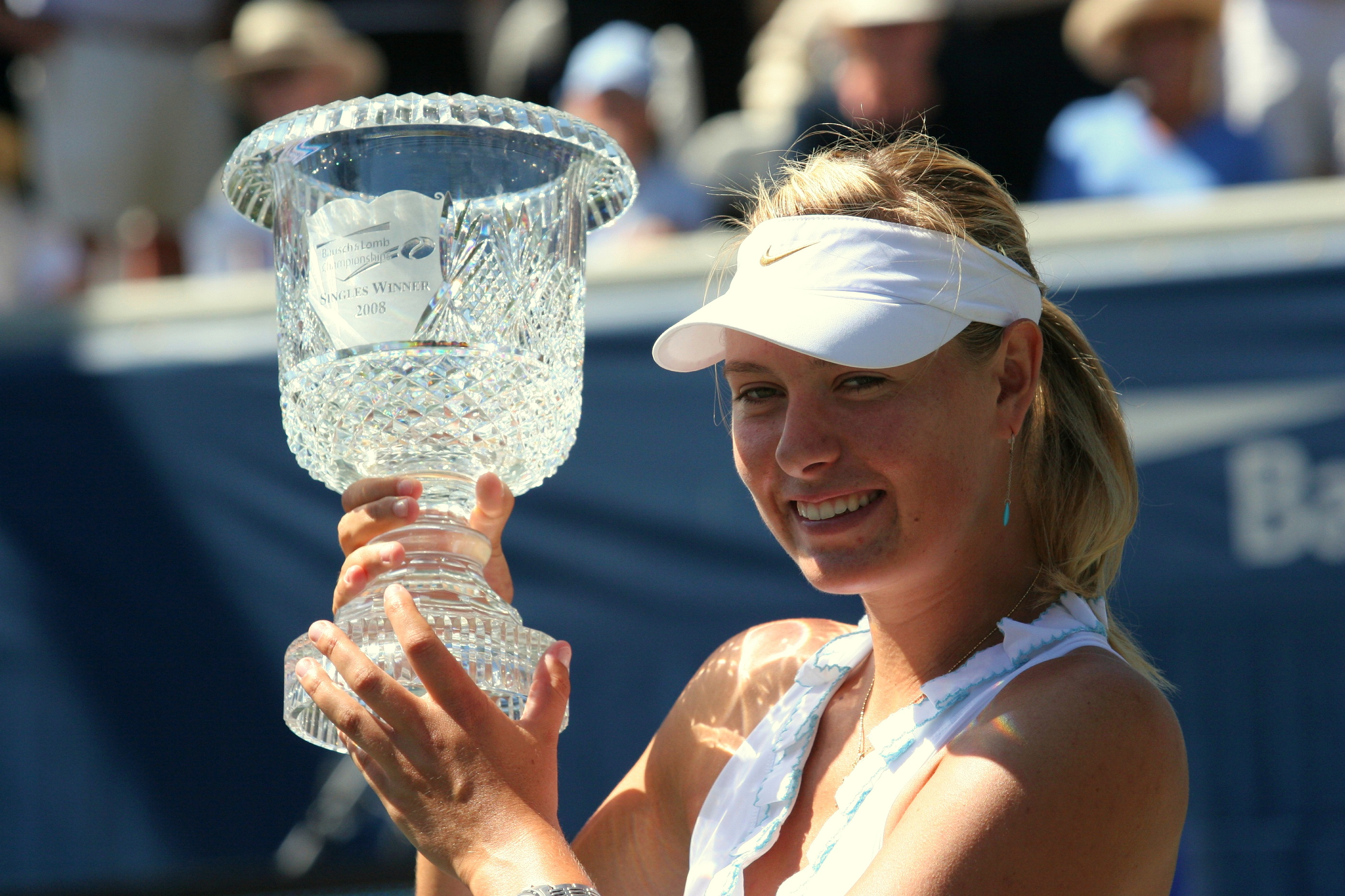
Maria Sharapova holding the 2008 Bausch & Lomb Championship trophy

The 2008 Bausch & Lomb Championships was the 29th edition of that tennis tournament and was played on outdoor clay courts. It was classified as a Tier II event on the 2008 WTA Tour. The event took place at the Racquet Park at the Amelia Island Plantation in Amelia Island, Florida, U.S. from April 7 through April 13, 2008. The tournament offered total prize money of US$600,000. First-seeded Maria Sharapova won the singles title and earned $95,500 first-prize money.

Tatiana Golovin of France was the defending singles champion.

== Review ==
Maria Sharapova, in her first event appearance, defeated Dominika Cibulková in the final to become the champion. This was also her first clay court title. Other top ten players appearing included Anna Chakvetadze, Australian Open semi-finalist Daniela Hantuchová and Marion Bartoli. Other notable names participating were three-time Grand Slam champion Lindsay Davenport and Amélie Mauresmo.

== Finals ==
=== Singles ===
(Russia) Maria Sharapova defeated (Slovakia) Dominika Cibulková, 7–6^{(9–7)}, 6–3

- This was Sharapova's third title of the year, 19th of her career, and her first clay court title.

=== Doubles ===
(United States) Bethanie Mattek / (Czech Republic) Vladimíra Uhlířová defeated (Belarus) Victoria Azarenka / (Russia) Elena Vesnina, 6–3, 6–1
