= 2008 Bausch & Lomb Championships – Doubles =

Doubles
- 2008 Bausch & Lomb Championships

Final
- Champions: (United States) Bethanie Mattek (Czech Republic) Vladimíra Uhlířová
- Runners-up: (Belarus) Victoria Azarenka (Russia) Elena Vesnina
- Score: 6–3, 6–1

Details
- Draw: 16 (2 WC )
- Seeds: 4

Events
Singles	Doubles
- Amelia Island Championships

The women's doubles draw for the 2008 Bausch & Lomb Championships.

== Seeds ==
1. (Zimbabwe) Cara Black / (United States) Liezel Huber (first round)
2. (Chinese Taipei) Chan Yung Jan / (Chinese Taipei) Chuang Chia-jung (quarterfinals)
3. (Russia) Dinara Safina / (Hungary) Ágnes Szávay (quarterfinals)
4. (China) Peng Shuai / (China) Sun Tiantian (first round)

== Draw ==
=== Key ===
- WC = Wild card
- r = Retired
- w/o = Walkover

First round
1	(Zimbabwe) C Black (United States) L Huber	5	2
(Belarus) T Poutchek (Russia) A Rodionova	7	6
(Belarus) V Azarenka (Russia) E Vesnina	7	6
(Slovakia) J Husárová (Poland) A Radwańska	6^{5}	4
4	(China) S Peng (China) T Sun	5	4
(France) N Dechy (United States) M Shaughnessy	7	6
(Ukraine) T Perebiynis (Russia) G Voskoboeva	6	6
(Australia) A Molik (Australia) B Stewart	4	4
(Spain) A Medina Garrigues (Spain) V Ruano Pascual	6	7
(Russia) E Likhovtseva (United States) L Raymond	0	5
(Argentina) G Dulko (United States) V King	6^{6}	6	[3]
3	(Russia) D Safina (Hungary) Á Szávay	7	3	[10]
(United States) B Mattek (Czech Republic) V Uhlířová	5	6	[21]
WC	(United States) J Craybas (Netherlands) M Krajicek	7	4	[19]
WC	(Ukraine) A Bondarenko (Russia) A Jidkova	4	3
2	(Chinese Taipei) Y-J Chan (Chinese Taipei) C-J Chuang	6	6

Quarterfinals
(Belarus) T Poutchek (Russia) A Rodionova	0	4
(Belarus) V Azarenka (Russia) E Vesnina	6	6
(France) N Dechy (United States) M Shaughnessy	7	7
(Ukraine) T Perebiynis (Russia) G Voskoboeva	5	5
(Spain) A Medina Garrigues (Spain) V Ruano Pascual	3	6	[10]
3	(Russia) D Safina (Hungary) Á Szávay	6	0	[7]
(United States) B Mattek (Czech Republic) V Uhlířová	6	6
2	(Chinese Taipei) Y-J Chan (Chinese Taipei) C-J Chuang	4	3

Semifinals
(Belarus) V Azarenka (Russia) E Vesnina	6	7
(France) N Dechy (United States) M Shaughnessy	4	6^{5}
(Spain) A Medina Garrigues (Spain) V Ruano Pascual	7	4	[8]
(United States) B Mattek (Czech Republic) V Uhlířová	6^{5}	6	[10]

Final
(Belarus) V Azarenka (Russia) E Vesnina	3	1
(United States) B Mattek (Czech Republic) V Uhlířová	6	6
