= Nadia Petrova =

Russian tennis player (born 1982)

Nadia Petrova Надежда Петрова
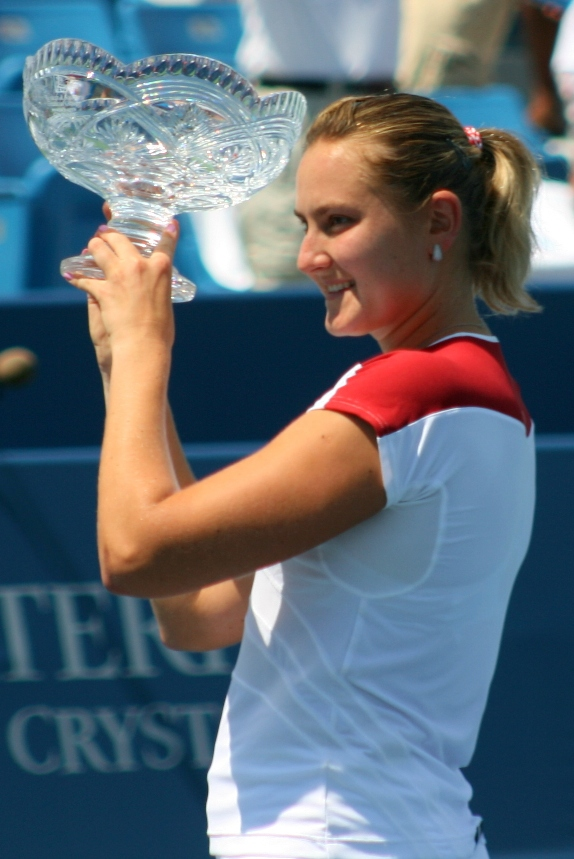
- Petrova winning in Cincinnati
- Country (sports): Russia
- Residence: Miami, United States
- Born: 8 June 1982 (age 44) Moscow, Soviet Union
- Height: 1.78 m (5 ft 10 in)
- Turned pro: 6 September 1999
- Retired: 11 January 2017
- Plays: Right-handed (two-handed backhand)
- Prize money: US$ 12,466,924

Singles
- Career record: 533–303
- Career titles: 13
- Highest ranking: No. 3 (15 May 2006)

Grand Slam singles results
- Australian Open: QF (2006, 2010)
- French Open: SF (2003, 2005)
- Wimbledon: QF (2005, 2008)
- US Open: QF (2004, 2005)

Other tournaments
- Tour Finals: RR (2005, 2006, 2008)
- Olympic Games: 3R (2012)

Doubles
- Career record: 384–175
- Career titles: 24
- Highest ranking: No. 3 (21 March 2005)

Grand Slam doubles results
- Australian Open: SF (2011)
- French Open: F (2012)
- Wimbledon: QF (2004, 2005, 2007, 2013)
- US Open: F (2010)

Other doubles tournaments
- Tour Finals: W (2004, 2012)
Medal record
Representing Russia
Olympic Games
Bronze medal – third place	2012 London	Doubles

Nadezhda Viktorovna "Nadia" Petrova (Russian: Надежда Викторовна Петрова; born 8 June 1982) is a Russian former professional tennis player. A former top-five player in both singles and doubles, she reached a career-high ranking of No. 3 in the world in both disciplines (doing so in doubles on 21 March 2005, then in singles on 15 May 2006). Petrova won a total of 37 titles on the WTA Tour in her career, 13 in singles and 24 in doubles, as well as over $12.4 million in prize money, making her one of the most successful Russian tennis players of all time.

Petrova's career highlights in singles include reaching a total of nine Grand Slam quarterfinals across all four major tournaments (including two Grand Slam semifinals at the French Open in 2003 and 2005), and qualifying for the WTA Tour Championships on three occasions. Her largest singles titles came at two Tier-I tournaments, Charleston and Berlin in 2006 (during a span in which she won three consecutive tournaments and a career-best 15 matches in a row), one Premier 5 title in Tokyo in 2012, and winning the year-end Tournament of Champions in 2012. From June 2003 to September 2013, Petrova was continuously ranked inside the top 30 (a period of 538 weeks), was inside the top 20 for over 500 of them, and spent over 150 weeks ranked inside the top 10. Over a 10 year period from 2003 to 2012, she finished the year ranked inside the top 30 on every single occasion, and inside the top 20 in all of them except 2011.

Equally successful in doubles, Petrova's career highlights included winning the year-ending WTA Championships twice, with Meghann Shaughnessy in 2004, and with compatriot Maria Kirilenko in 2012. With Kirilenko, she also won the bronze medal in the doubles competition at the 2012 Summer Olympics. She also reached two major finals in doubles, doing so at the 2010 US Open with Liezel Huber and the 2012 French Open with Kirilenko. She also won a total of nine Tier I/Premier Mandatory titles (including three in Miami in 2004, 2012 and 2013), was a seven-time Grand Slam doubles semifinalist, a twenty-time major quarterfinalist, and finished with a year-end top-ten ranking four times.

Petrova announced her retirement from professional tennis on 11 January 2017 at the age of 34, due to a multitude of injuries and a nearly three-year absence from the tour (she played her last pro match in April 2014).

== Biography ==
=== Early life ===
Petrova was born in Moscow. Her father Viktor was a hammer thrower, while her mother Nadezhda Ilyina won a bronze medal at the 1976 Montreal Olympics in the 400 m relay. Her father is still an athletics coach, and her mother was an athletics coach until her death in 2013. As a child, Nadia did a lot of travelling around the world with her parents. She eventually settled in Egypt, where she trained with Mohammed Saif and her parents.

=== Playing style ===
Petrova is an all-court aggressive player who is capable of hitting winners off both wings, but particularly off her back-hand and which she hits flat and with slice. Nadia's weaknesses are her movement and exhibiting mental fragility during key points in highly contested matches.

== Career ==
=== Early years ===
As a junior, Petrova won the 1998 French Open, beating Jelena Dokic in the final. The same year, she finished runner-up at the Orange Bowl to Elena Dementieva and she also finished runner-up at the junior event of the 1999 US Open to Lina Krasnoroutskaya. In May 1998, she played her first WTA tournament at the J&S Cup as a wildcard entrant. She also received a wildcard for her home event in Moscow, the Kremlin Cup, where she picked up her first top-20 win over Iva Majoli. By the end of 1999, Petrova had reached the top 100.

In 2000, she reached the third round of the Australian Open and the quarterfinals of the Miami Open, beating Julie Halard-Decugis for her first top-ten win before losing to Lindsay Davenport. She finished the season at No. 50. She reached the fourth round of both French Open and the US Open in 2001 and her ranking hit a high of No. 38 during the season. Petrova also broke through in doubles in 2001, winning her first two WTA Tour titles in Rosmalen and Linz (the latter of which alongside Dokic, by then a top-10 player). However, her 2002 season was marred by injuries causing her singles ranking to drop out of the top 100. During this time, Petrova mainly focused on doubles, reaching the semifinals of the US Open with Nicole Pratt, two Tier I finals in Moscow and Zurich with Dokic, and reaching the top 20.

=== 2003–2004: First major semifinal, doubles prominence, and top 10 rankings ===
At the 2003 Australian Open, Petrova defeated Gréta Arn 6–2, 6–1 and then upset 21st seed Ai Sugiyama 6–4, 6–4 in the second round. She then lost to world No. 15, Patty Schnyder, 2–6, 6–4, 3–6 in the third round.

Petrova was ranked world No. 76 going into the French Open. In the first round, she beat the three-time champion and world No. 12, Monica Seles 6–4, 6–0, on what was to be Seles' last professional match. She then defeated Silvija Talaja 6–1, 6–1 and Marissa Irvin 6–1, 6–1 to reach the fourth round. Here, Petrova stunned seventh seed and 2001 French Open champion Jennifer Capriati, 6–3, 4–6, 6–3. In the quarterfinals, she won again in three sets over 21st seed Vera Zvonareva 6–1, 4–6, 6–3 to reach her first ever Grand Slam semifinal. Petrova faced world No. 2, Kim Clijsters, and despite having a set point in the first set, Petrova was beaten in straight sets 7–5, 6–1. However, her ranking increased to world No. 30.

Petrova reached the semifinals of Rosmalen, defeating Elena Dementieva en route but lost to world No. 3, Justine Henin, in three sets. At Wimbledon, Petrova was seeded 29th and made it to the third round, before losing to Venus Williams, 1–6, 2–6. She was seeded 19th at the US Open and defeated 14th seed Amanda Coetzer, 6–0, 6–1 in the third round. In the fourth round, Petrova lost to third seed Lindsay Davenport 0–6, 7–6, 2–6. She continued her success by reaching the semifinals of Zurich, beating fellow Russian, world No. 8 and US Open finalist, Elena Dementieva, before losing to Henin 4–6, 4–6.

The following week in Linz, Petrova beat Paola Suárez and Patty Schnyder to reach her first WTA Tour singles final. However, she fell to Ai Sugiyama 5–7, 4–6. Petrova ended 2003 ranked world No. 12, with a 45–23 singles record.

Petrova reached her second singles final at Gold Coast, losing once again to Sugiyama 6–1, 1–6, 4–6. Although seeded 10th at the 2004 Australian Open, she was upset in the first round by Anikó Kapros, losing 3–6, 3–6.

In March 2004, she entered the top 10 singles rankings, after reaching the semifinals of the Tier-1 Miami Open, climbing to No. 9 in the world. She reached the semifinals at Amelia Island, beating second-seeded Serena Williams, before losing to Lindsay Davenport. After this, her ranking elevated to a career high of No. 7. However, she failed to defend her semifinal points from the 2003 French Open, losing to Marlene Weingärtner in the third round, 3–6, 2–6. Petrova fared slightly better at Wimbledon, reaching the fourth round before losing to Capriati.

At the US Open, she pulled off the biggest win of her career by defeating world No. 1 and defending champion, Justine Henin-Hardenne, 6–3, 6–2 in the fourth round. It was Petrova's first victory over a world No. 1. She lost in the quarterfinals to eventual champion Svetlana Kuznetsova, 6–7, 3–6.

Petrova reached the semifinals of Linz, losing to Elena Bovina in three sets, before reaching the semifinals of Philadelphia, losing to Vera Zvonareva. She finished the year ranked world No. 12 in singles (with a 40–25 record) but qualified for the WTA Championships in doubles for the first time with Meghann Shaughnessy after a season that saw the pair win six doubles titles (including three at Tier I level). The pair defeated the second seeds Kuznetsova and Elena Likhovtseva in the semifinals, then beat Cara Black and Rennae Stubbs to win the title, the biggest of Petrova's career. As a result of her doubles success in 2004, she finished the year inside the top 10 for the first time at world No. 7.

=== 2005: Second French Open semifinal, first career singles title, and top 10 finish ===
Petrova reached the fourth round of the Australian Open, losing to the eventual champion Serena Williams, in three sets. Over the next two months, her best result was a semifinal appearance at the Open Gaz de France. In doubles, she reached the final at Indian Wells with Meghan Shaughnessy, where they lost to Paola Suárez and Virginia Ruano Pascual. Following Indian Wells, Petrova rose to her career-high doubles ranking of No. 3 in the world.

After making the semifinals in Amelia Island and the quarterfinals in Charleston, Petrova reached her third career final (and first at Tier I level) at the German Open in May, beating Mary Pierce, Amélie Mauresmo and Jelena Janković, before losing to Justine Henin-Hardenne. This performance lifted her ranking to No. 9, starting a two-plus year period of continuously being ranked inside the top 10.

At the French Open, Petrova defeated 17-year-old Ana Ivanovic in the quarterfinals before losing to Henin-Hardenne 6–2, 6–3 in the semifinals; her performance at the tournament saw her ranking rise to world No. 8. She also reached the semifinals in doubles with Shaughnessy, but the pair would split shortly afterwards to Shaughnessy's multiple injuries. A few weeks later at Wimbledon, she reached the quarterfinals before losing to defending champion Maria Sharapova, 6–7, 3–6. After Wimbledon, she was defeated in the quarterfinals of the next five tournaments she entered. This included the events in Los Angeles, Toronto, Luxembourg, and Filderstadt. Between Toronto and Luxembourg, Petrova also competed at the US Open, where she made her third consecutive Grand Slam quarterfinal. However, she was beaten by Sharapova (the new world No. 1) in straight sets for the second time in a row at Grand Slam level.

After losing the final in Bangkok to 16 year-old Nicole Vaidišová, Petrova finally won her first singles title on her fifth attempt at the Generali Ladies Linz (where she had reached her first ever WTA final in 2003) with a comeback three-set win over Patty Schnyder in the final. Her successful singles season meant she qualified for the WTA Championships in Los Angeles. She thrashed Maria Sharapova 6–1, 6–2, but lost here other two singles matches to Patty Schnyder and Lindsay Davenport meaning she exited at the round robin stage. She ended 2005 ranked world No. 9 (her first top-10 finish) and a 56-22 record, a career-high single season wins total.

=== 2006: Five singles titles, top 3 ranking in both singles and doubles ===
At the Australian Open, Petrova was seeded sixth and defeated Sophie Ferguson, Martina Müller, Maria Elena Camerin, and Elena Vesnina on her way to her first quarterfinal at the Australian Open, the only major in which she had not yet advanced to that round. She lost to fourth-seeded Maria Sharapova, 6–7, 4–6 in the quarterfinals.

At the Qatar Ladies Open, Petrova picked up her first title of the year and second overall by beating second-ranked and top-seeded Amélie Mauresmo, 6–3, 7–5, in the final. The victory took her ranking to No. 7. She followed it with a quarterfinal showing at the Miami Open, losing to Mauresmo, 3–6, 1–6.

Petrova then began a run that would take her to three titles, winning fifteen straight matches. At Amelia Island, she defeated Francesca Schiavone in the final to pick up her third career title. One week later, she won her second consecutive title and the biggest of her career in Charleston with a victory over Patty Schnyder. This was Petrova's first Tier I title.

She next entered the German Open in Berlin, defeating Justine Henin-Hardenne in three sets for her fifth career singles title, her third consecutive singles title, and her second consecutive Tier I title. With this win, Petrova extended her winning streak to a career-best 15 matches and ascended to her career-high singles ranking of world No. 3.

However, despite being one of the favorites for the French Open, Petrova suffered an ankle injury during training just days before the start of the tournament and was upset in the first round by Akiko Morigami, 2–6, 2–6. This marked the first time Petrova lost in the opening round of a major since the 2004 Australian Open – Women's singles, snapping her 15-match winning streak, as well as her streak of four consecutive Grand Slam quarterfinals. Petrova's injury forced her to later withdrew from Wimbledon. Her return a few weeks later went poorly as she did not win a match in the US Open Series, going 0–3. During this time, however, she won her first doubles title since the 2004 WTA Championships at the Tier I Canadian Open, alongside the great Martina Navratilova. More significantly, this was the 177th and final WTA Tour doubles of Navratilova's career (an all-time record) before her permanent retirement at the end of the year. The US Open went poorly, however, as Petrova was upset in the third round by French teenager Tatiana Golovin.

After winning just one match in her next two tournaments, Petrova rebounded by winning the Porsche Tennis Grand Prix. She avenged her loss at the US Open to Golovin by beating the 18-year old in straight sets to earn her fifth title of the year and her first since the ankle injury. She then continued her return to form by reaching her seventh singles final of the year at the Kremlin Cup in Moscow, losing to compatriot Anna Chakvetadze.

At the WTA Championships in Madrid in November 2006, her lone victory was over top-ranked Amélie Mauresmo, 6–2, 6–2. She finished the year at No. 6 (her best ever year-end ranking) and a 48-19 match record.

=== 2007: Dip in form ===
At the Australian Open, Petrova reached the third round, before falling to Serena Williams, the eventual champion, after holding a 5–3 lead in the second set.

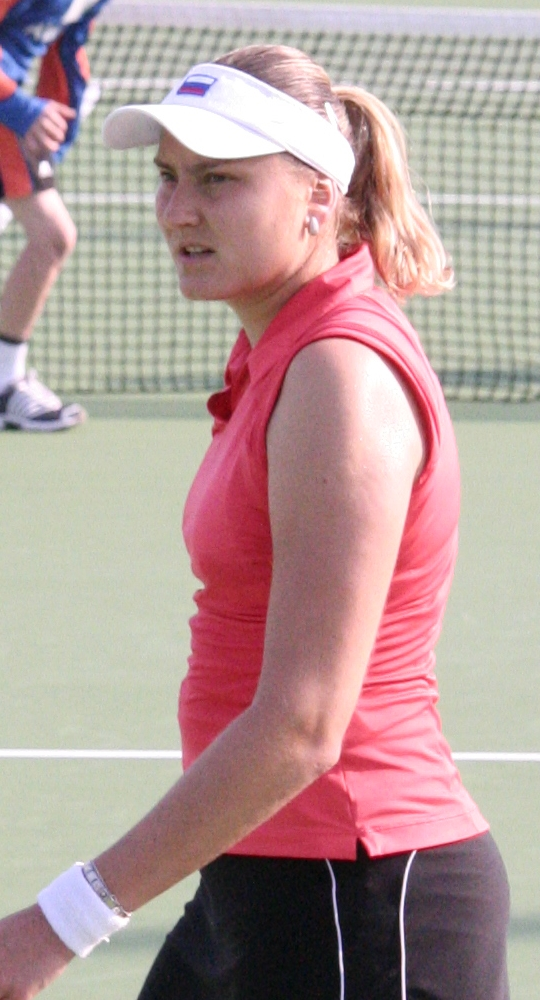
Petrova at the 2007 Australian Open

At the Open Gaz de France in Paris, Petrova picked up her seventh career tour title and first of the season by beating Lucie Šafářová. Petrova reached the quarterfinals in Key Biscayne, losing to Justine Henin. Petrova then reached the final in Amelia Island where she was the defending champion, but lost to Golovin. After choosing not to compete in Charleston, Petrova failed to defend her title in Berlin, losing to Svetlana Kuznetsova in the quarterfinals, before retiring from her third-round match at the Italian Open due to low back pain.

She was the eleventh-seeded player at the French Open, but was upset by Květa Peschke, 5–7, 7–5, 0–6. After the loss, she claimed that the lower-back pain sustained in Rome had been bothering her. It was her second consecutive first-round loss at the French Open because of an injury. At Wimbledon, Petrova lost to 19 year-old Ana Ivanovic 1–6, 6–2, 4–6 in the fourth round.

In the 2007 Fed Cup tie against the U.S. team in July, Petrova played a pivotal role in securing the victory for her team. While losing on the first day against Venus Williams, she won her singles match against Meilen Tu on the second day, and then teamed with Elena Vesnina to beat Williams and Lisa Raymond in the decisive doubles rubber.

At the LA Championships, Petrova reached her third final of the year, losing to Ana Ivanovic in straight sets. At the US Open, Petrova was seeded seventh, but lost to Ágnes Szávay in the third round, 4–6, 4–6. The loss meant that she had not gone past the fourth round of any Grand Slam tournament all year, the first time since 2002.

She finished 2007 ranked No. 14, her lowest year-end ranking in five years.

=== 2008: Wimbledon quarterfinal, multiple titles ===
Petrova started her 2008 season on a two-match losing streak going into the Australian Open, losing in the first round in Gold Coast as the second seed to Tathiana Garbin, 7–5, 5–7, 3–6, and in Sydney 5–7, 3–6 to Sybille Bammer. She still managed to reach the fourth round of the Australian Open though as the 14th seed with wins over Nicole Pratt, Anne Kremer, and Ekaterina Makarova, all in straight sets. There she played Agnieszka Radwańska, who beat her 6–1, 5–7, 0–6. Petrova held a 6–1, 3–0 lead and looked to be on her way to an easy victory. In the third set, she won just four points.

Petrova's injuries continued to strike -when she was forced to retire in the second round of Miami with a right quad strain while trailing 1–2 in the first set against Zheng Jie.

At the German Open in Berlin, Petrova returned to action as the 16th seed and defeated Katarina Srebotnik in a three-setter the first round, before losing in the second to Maria Kirilenko, 3–6, 3–6. As a result, she dropped out of the top 20 for the first time since August 2003. Petrova was once again defeated by Kirilenko in the first round of Rome, but this time in three sets. At her final warm-up tournament in Istanbul, Nadia was seeded third and got past Lilia Osterloh in the first and Marta Domachowska in the second round. She lost to Akgul Amanmuradova in three sets in the quarterfinals.

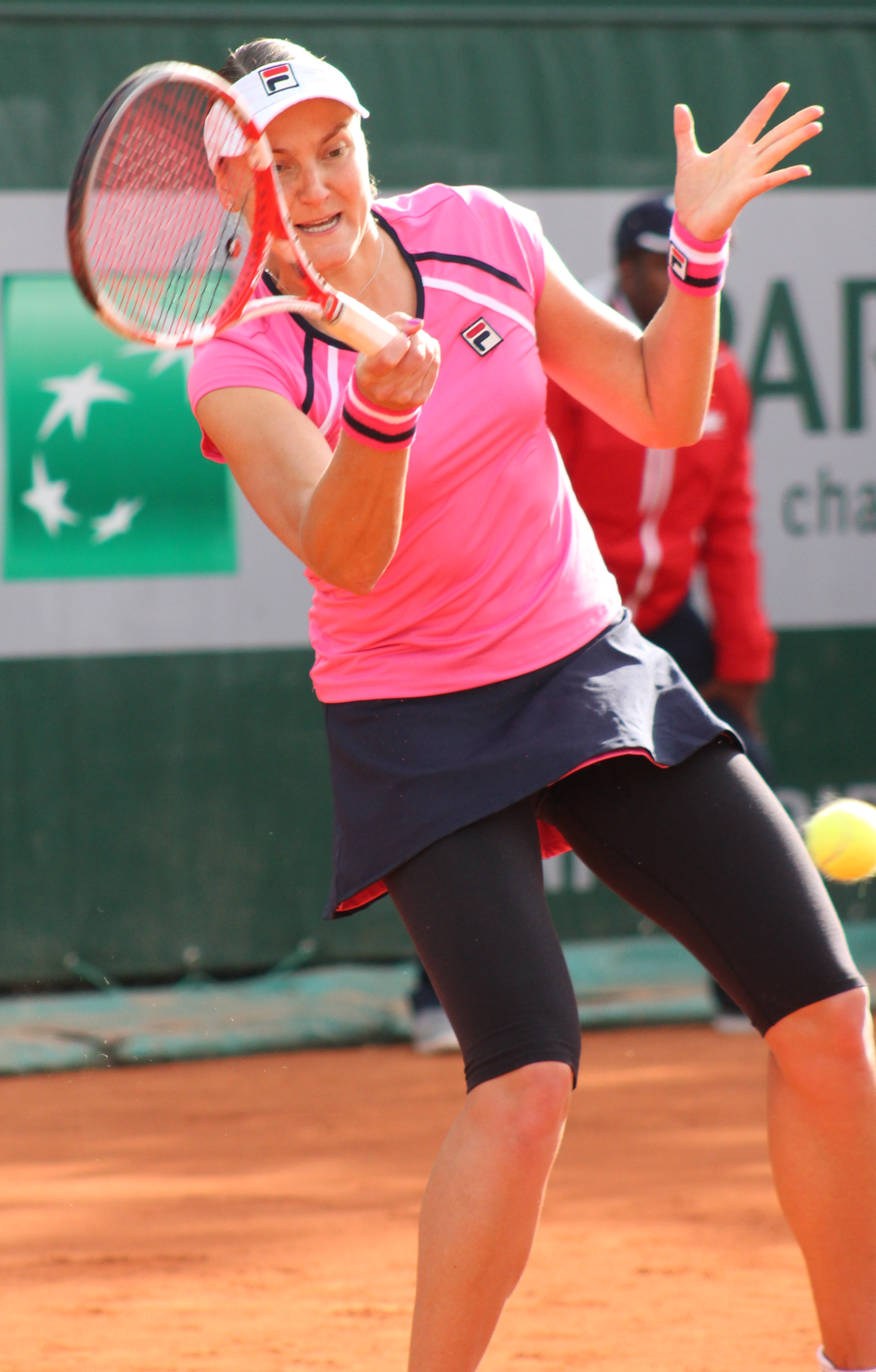
Petrova at the French Open

These losses put Petrova in poor stead going into the French Open. As the 25th seed, she beat Aravane Rezaï and Alisa Kleybanova, in straight sets, before being thrashed by Kuznetsova in the third round, 6–2, 6–1.

Petrova's grass-court season began at Eastbourne, where she reached her first final of the year showing good form. She was beaten in a close match by Agnieszka Radwańska, 6–4, 6–7, 6–4.

At Wimbledon, Petrova was 21st seed and was on track after wins over Olga Govortsova and Mara Santangelo. Petrova then pulled off an excellent win over the in-form teenager and 16th seed Victoria Azarenka in the third round. In the fourth round, she faced unseeded Alla Kudryavtseva who just came off a win over third seed Maria Sharapova; Petrova won to reach her second quarterfinal at Wimbledon, and her seventh at major level. This was also the first time that Petrova had reached a Grand Slam quarterfinal since the 2006 Australian Open. She lost a tough two and a half hour marathon match against the fifth seed Elena Dementieva, 1–6, 7–6, 3–6. Petrova rallied from 6–1, 5–2 down and saved match points throughout the second set, but eventually lost the match in the third set. Her ranking improved to world No. 17 after the tournament.

Bouncing back from a first-round defeat at Stanford to Dominika Cibulková, Petrova reached the quarterfinals at Los Angeles, defeating fifth seed Zvonareva en route, before losing to Janković, 5–7, 4–6. At Montreal, she again suffered a surprise defeat by Cibulková in the third round, this time losing 6–7, 2–6.

Nadia then played in Cincinnati, as she did not gain entry into the Beijing Olympics because she was not in the top-four ranked Russian players at the time. After easy wins over Galina Voskoboeva, Julie Ditty, and Lilia Osterloh, Petrova once again found herself up against Maria Kirilenko for a place in the final. This time though, Petrova was victorious, coming back from a set down to win, 1–6, 6–2, 6–1. Petrova then thrashed Nathalie Dechy, 6–2, 6–1, in the final to win her first singles title of the year, the eighth of her career, and her first since February 2007. She also won the doubles title in Cincinnati, partnering with Kirilenko, beating Hsieh Su-wei and Yaroslava Shvedova in the final in a third-set tiebreak. This marked Petrova's 13th career doubles title and her first in two years.

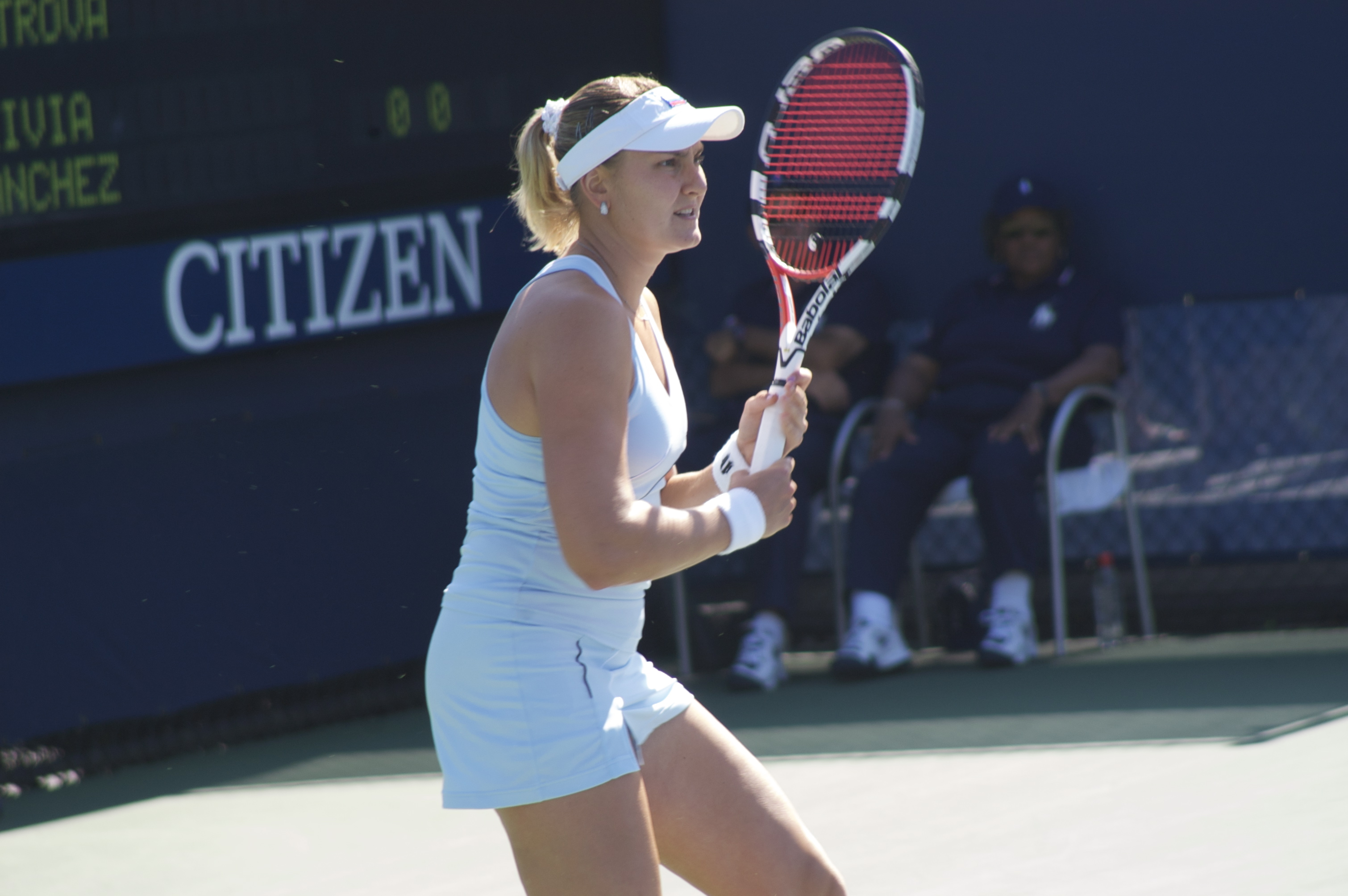
Nadia at the 2008 US Open

Petrova was in good form heading into the final Grand Slam tournament of the year at the US Open, where she was seeded 19th. She handidly beat Olivia Sanchez in the first round and Hsieh Su-wei in the second but was ousted, 4–6, 6–4, 6–3, by the 16th seed Flavia Pennetta in the third round.

Petrova bounced back to good form at the Bali Tennis Classic. Seeded fourth, Nadia defeated fifth seed Francesca Schiavone in the quarterfinals, but she lost in the semifinals to second seed and eventual champion Patty Schnyder, 5–7, 1–6.

At the Pan Pacific Open in Tokyo, Petrova was unseeded, but beat two top–10 players, Ana Ivanovic, the second seed in the second round, and Agnieszka Radwańska to reach the semifinals, where she lost 1–6, 0–6 to Dinara Safina, the eventual champion. In the doubles tournament with Vania King, the duo managed to beat three out of the four seeded teams to win the title. Two weeks later in Stuttgart, she reached her third final of the season, after an impressive run, beating Barbora Záhlavová-Strýcová, Patty Schnyder, Li Na, and Victoria Azarenka in straight sets. She failed to win the title, this time losing to Jelena Janković, the world No. 2, 4–6, 3–6. Despite not winning the title, Petrova's ranking moved back to world No. 14, as a result of reaching the final.

Petrova was a quarterfinalist at her home event, the Kremlin Cup in Moscow, beating teenager Caroline Wozniacki, before losing to compatriot and third seed Elena Dementieva, 4–6, 6–4, 6–7. However, she won the doubles title (her third of the season) with Katarina Srebotnik as the pair defeated the defending champions, Cara Black and Liezel Huber, in the final. She was also a quarterfinalist in Linz, losing 3–6, 2–6 to Radwańska.

At her final tournament of the season in Quebec City, Petrova won her second title of the year (and ninth of her career), beating lucky loser Angela Haynes in the semifinals and Bethanie Mattek-Sands, 4–6, 6–4, 6–1, in the final. This title also secured her status as the second alternate for the Tour Championships should a second player withdraw. This did indeed happen, and Petrova came in replacing Serena Williams, who pulled out after her second round-robin with a stomach injury. She lost her only match to Dementieva, 4–6, 6–4, 4–6.

Petrova finished the 2008 season ranked world No. 11 with a 47-24 match record.

=== 2009: Poor results ===
Petrova started 2009 playing at the Sydney International, where she was seeded seventh. She lost in the first round to Alizé Cornet, 2–6, 4–6. Petrova was seeded tenth at the Australian Open in Melbourne. She lost to seventh–seeded Vera Zvonareva in the fourth round, 5–7, 4–6. Nevertheless, because of defending champion Maria Sharapova's absence due to shoulder surgery and Ana Ivanovic's third round loss, Petrova's ranking moved back inside the top 10 for the first time since early 2007.

Petrova did not play in the Indian Wells, a Premier Mandatory event due to injury. In Miami, Nadia entered as ninth seed, but lost to world No. 54, Ekaterina Makarova, in the third round, 5–7, 1–6.

Petrova next headed to Ponte Vedra Beach as the top seed, where she defeated Olga Govortsova, Madison Keys (who had just won her first main-draw match), and Alona Bondarenko. She fell in the semifinals to eventual finalist Aleksandra Wozniak, 4–6, 6–4, 2–6. Petrova fell in the second round at Charleston to Melinda Czink, but won the doubles title partnering Bethanie Mattek-Sands. At the Porsche Tennis Grand Prix, Petrova was seeded sixth, but lost in the second round to Flavia Pennetta, 2–6, 2–6. Despite the poor singles result, she did well in doubles once more, winning the title with Mattek-Sands. She next went to the Rome Masters as eighth seed, where she had a first-round bye before defeating giant-killer Carla Suárez Navarro. In the third round, Petrova was ousted by María José Martínez Sánchez, 4–6, 7–6, 4–6.

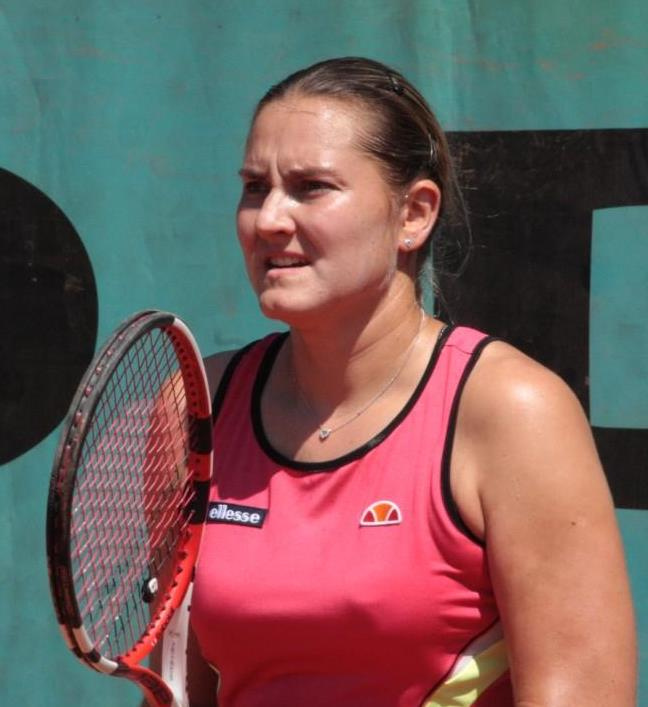
Nadia Petrova at the 2009 French Open

Petrova's next tournament was Wimbledon, the third Grand Slam of the year, where she was the tenth seed. She beat Anastasiya Yakimova in the first round. Petrova won her second-round match against Shahar Pe'er, and then came from a set down to beat Gisela Dulko. Petrova lost to Victoria Azarenka in three sets in the fourth round.

Petrova began her US Open Series campaign at Stanford, where she was seeded fifth. After defeating her doubles partner Bethanie Mattek-Sands in three sets in the first round, Petrova lost again to Sharapova, 1–6, 2–6, in just over an hour. In Los Angeles, she was also seeded fifth, but lost to tenth seed Flavia Pennetta, 3–6, 3–6, in the third round. Petrova then headed to Cincinnati, where she was the defending champion and the tenth seed. She was unable to defend her title, losing in the first round to Alona Bondarenko, 2–6, 3–6. This caused her ranking to slip out of the top 10 (where she had been since the end of the Australian Open) to world No. 12. Petrova next played in Toronto as the tenth seed, where her poor form continued as she fell again to Maria Sharapova in the first round. Continuing her campaign on the US Open Series, she then received a wildcard as the fourth seed at the New Haven, but again lost to compatriot Anna Chakvetadze in the first round.

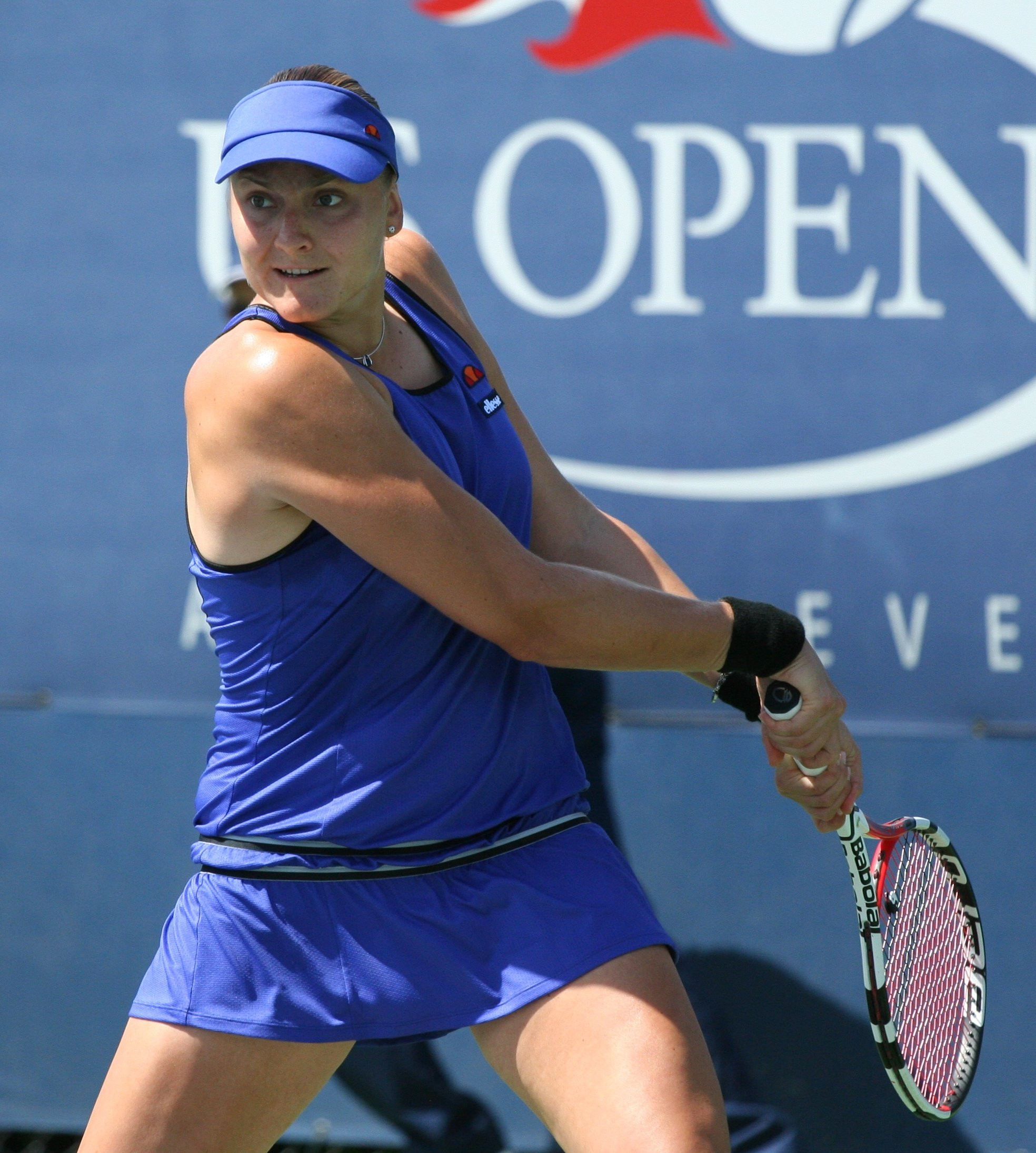
Nadia Petrova at the 2009 US Open

Her next tournament was the final major of the year, the US Open. Petrova was the 13th seed and defeated Katarina Srebotnik and Julie Coin in the first and second round in straight sets. Petrova then got past world No. 22, Zheng Jie. Petrova was defeated in the fourth round by the 17 year-old unseeded American Melanie Oudin, 1–6, 7–6, 6–3. However, her ranking improved one spot to world No. 12.

Petrova then headed to Quebec to defend her title at the Bell Challenge. Petrova was the top seed and advanced to the quarterfinals with wins over Carly Gullickson and Madison Brengle in straight sets. Here, Petrova faced fifth seed Melinda Czink and was a set down when she was forced to retire due to a viral illness. Czink would go on to win the title. However, Nadia quickly returned to action in Tokyo as 13th seed, but continued a dismal season, losing in the second round to Magdaléna Rybáriková, 2–6, 2–6. She slipped to world No. 17 as a result of this bad form. Nadia then participated at China Open, where she was 13th seed. She beat Alla Kudryavtseva in the first round and world No. 24, Daniela Hantuchová in the second round. She played one of her best matches in 2009 by beating Serena Williams in a thriller three-set match in the third round, despite the fact that Williams was just about to snitch back the world No. 1 ranking from Dinara Safina the following week. Petrova then survived another three-setter against Peng Shuai in the quarterfinals. This was only Petrova's second semifinal of the year, but she lost to the reigning French Open Champion, Svetlana Kuznetsova, 1–6, 3–6.

Petrova then competed in the Kremlin Cup in both singles and doubles. Seeded fifth, she defeated Yana Buchina in the first round, but fell to Alona Bondarenko in the second round. Alongside Maria Kirilenko, the pair won the doubles title by beating Maria Kondratieva and Klára Zakopalová in the final. This was her third doubles title of the season (all at Premier level), her third Kremlin Cup title, and the 18th of her career.

Petrova finished her poor year with a 30–21 singles record and ranked world No. 20. It was by far her worst year on tour as she captured no singles titles for the first time since 2004, and failed to reach at least one final for the first time since 2002. Her highlights of the year are reaching the semifinals in Ponte Vedra Beach and Beijing and reaching the quarterfinals in Quebec City.

=== 2010: Two major singles quarterfinals, first doubles Grand Slam final ===
Her year started at the Brisbane International in Australia. After drawing comeback queen Justine Henin, Petrova lost in a close 5–7, 5–7 match. She then competed in the Sydney International, but lost again in the opening round to 39-year-old Kimiko Date-Krumm, 3–6, 7–5, 4–6.

Seeded 19th at the Australian Open, Petrova reached the third round by defeating Edina Gallovits and Kaia Kanepi. In the third round, she caused a huge upset by mothballing 15th seed Kim Clijsters 6–0, 6–1 in just 52 minutes. Clijsters, who had won the 2009 US Open in just her third tournament after coming back from retirement, was the bookmaker's second favourite to win the tournament. Petrova followed that with another upset in the fourth round over third seed and 2009 French Open champion Svetlana Kuznetsova. This was the second time in her career that she had reached the quarterfinals at the Australian Open. She fell to former world No. 1 and eventual runner-up Justine Henin (who had just come out of retirement herself), 6–7, 5–7, in a tight match after leading 3–0 in the second set.

After a first-round defeat to Stefanie Vögele in Dubai, Petrova next competed at the Premier Mandatory events in Indian Wells and Miami. Seeded 16th at Indian Wells and receiving a bye to the second round, she dispatched Patty Schnyder and then Peng Shuai, before losing in the fourth round to second seed Caroline Wozniacki. At the Miami Open, Petrova fell in the third round to 19th seed Daniela Hantuchová, 2–6, 4–6. She also played doubles with Samantha Stosur in both tournaments. The pair was able to reach the finals of both events, but could not come away with the elusive Sunshine Double, falling to Květa Peschke and Katarina Srebotnik at Indian Wells and Gisela Dulko and Flavia Pennetta in Miami. Nevertheless, these results brought Petrova back into the top 10 in doubles for the first time since August 2005.

Petrova began her clay-court season in Charleston and won her first two matches in straight sets against Vania King and Aleksandra Wozniak, before losing to Wozniacki in the quarterfinals. Partnering with Liezel Huber for the first time at this tournament, the duo won the title over Vania King and Michaëlla Krajicek.

On the red clay, Petrova was seeded 14th at the Italian Open. She advanced to the quarterfinals by defeating Tathiana Garbin, Katarina Srebotnik, and Alexandra Dulgheru, but lost here to world No. 58, Ana Ivanovic, 2–6, 5–7. Petrova was seeded 16th at the Madrid Open, where she beat Elena Vesnina and Anastasia Pavlyuchenkova to advance to the third round. Here, she had a fantastic win as she upset world No. 1, Serena Williams, 4–6, 6–2, 6–3. However, she fell to world No. 30, Lucie Šafářová, in the quarterfinals.

Petrova was seeded 19th at the French Open. She defeated Zhang Shuai in the first round and the talented Ágnes Szávay in the second round. In the third round, she fell a set behind against the in-form 15th seed and recent Madrid champion Aravane Rezaï, before coming back to take the second set. In the third set, Petrova saved three match points, as Rezaï served for the match at 5–4, before Petrova came back to serve for the match herself at 7–6. She too held three match points. Rezaï, however, broke back, and the match was postponed due to bad light. The match was completed the following day, when Petrova won, 6–7, 6–4, 10–8. She continued her success in the fourth round, where she stunned the world No. 2, Venus Williams, 6–4, 6–3, to advance to her ninth career major quarterfinal and her first at the French Open since 2005. Petrova led by a set in her quarterfinal match against fifth seed Elena Dementieva, but required treatment twice by the trainer during the match and limped to the finish line with Dementieva winning 2–6, 6–2, 6–0. Despite this loss, her quarterfinal run caused her ranking to improve to world No. 13. Playing doubles with Stosur, the fourth seeds retired in their third round match due to Petrova's ailment.

Beginning the grass-court season in Eastbourne, Petrova was unseeded and came back from a set down to win in a final set tie-break against Karolina Šprem in the first round. In the second round, she was heavily defeated, 6–2, 6–0, by the eventual champion Ekaterina Makarova. Petrova was seeded 12th at the Wimbledon Championships. She defeated Tatjana Malek in the first round and Chan Yung-jan in the second. Petrova then fell to 17th seed Justine Henin in the third round, 1–6, 4–6. This caused her ranking to slip to world No. 19. In doubles, Petrova and Stosur reached the third round once again but fell to the eventual champions Vania King and Yaroslava Shvedova.

Petrova next played at the Southern California Open in San Diego in her first event of the 2010 US Open Series. Unseeded, she was defeated in three sets in the first round by world No. 32 Yaroslava Shvedova, 5–7, 6–4, 6–1. Petrova was seeded 15th at Cincinnati, but was forced to retire due to heat stress while trailing 7–6, 5–3 to Christina McHale. Petrova was seeded 18th at the Rogers Cup in Montreal and won a tough opener against Lucie Šafářová. In the second round, she faced former world No. 1 Dinara Safina and despite serving 15 aces, she was defeated, 7–5, 4–6, 6–4. Petrova played the final event of the US Open Series at the New Haven Open, where she received a wildcard to play as the eighth seed. In the first round, she came from a set down to beat Varvara Lepchenko. She defeated her former doubles partner Bethanie Mattek-Sands to advance to the quarterfinals, and then had an impressive 6–2, 6–1 victory over second seed Samantha Stosur for her fourth top-ten win of the season. She defeated Maria Kirilenko in her semifinal match, but was beaten by Caroline Wozniacki in the final, in three sets.

Petrova was seeded 17th at the US Open. Despite her recent final appearance in New Haven, she suffered a shock first-round defeat at the hands of world No. 38, Andrea Petkovic, in a close three-setter. However, partnering up with Liezel Huber once again, she reached her first Grand Slam final, where they faced Wimbledon champions Shvedova and King. Despite winning the first set and having a championship point, they eventually lost, after the match got postponed due to rain.

Petrova bounced back in singles at the Korea Open in Seoul. As the top seed, her first-round opponent, was the world No. 41, Jarmila Groth, who had captured her first WTA Tour title the previous week in Guangzhou. However, Petrova came through comfortably. She then defeated Vania King to advance to the quarterfinals, where she thrashed Belgian Kirsten Flipkens, 6–2, 6–1. She then fell to Klára Zakopalová in the semifinals.

Petrova was the 15th seed at the Pan Pacific Open, but fell to Roberta Vinci in the first round. She ended her cooperation with her coach Vladimir Platenik and finished the 2010 season ranked world No. 15 in singles, but No. 8 in doubles, her first top-10 doubles ranking since 2004.

=== 2011: Mediocre results ===
Petrova began 2011 by suffering two first round losses at Brisbane and Sydney in the hands of Czechs Petra Kvitová and Záhlavová-Strýcová, respectively. At the Australian Open, where she was the 13th seed, she reached the third round after defeating Ksenia Pervak and Alicia Molik. There, she lost to Ekaterina Makarova in a tight three-setter. Playing with Liezel Huber, Petrova reached the semifinals in doubles for the first time, losing to eventual champions Dulko and Pennetta. She then reached the second round at Paris where she lost to Jelena Dokic, after defeating Virginie Razzano in the first round. At Doha, Petrova defeated Roberta Vinci in the opening round before succumbing to Caroline Wozniacki in straight sets. She reached the doubles final with Huber, losing to Peschke and Srebotnik.

At the Indian Wells Open, Petrova was the 20th seed and received a first round bye. She reached the fourth round, losing to Peng Shuai. She then retired against Sabine Lisicki in the second round at Miami after receiving a first-round bye, and reached the doubles final with Huber, where they were beaten by Daniela Hantuchová and Agnieszka Radwańska. On the green clay in Charleston, Petrova lost in the third round to Peng again. During the clay-court season, Petrova suffered early losses in the opening round at Madrid and Rome to Vania King and Ana Ivanovic, respectively. She then reached the quarterfinals at Strasbourg, losing to Daniela Hantuchová in straight sets. At the French Open, Petrova was the 26th seed and suffered a first round loss to Australian Anastasia Rodionova. Having split her doubles partnership with Huber, she chose to play with Rodionova instead. The pair reached the quarterfinals where they lost to Shvedova and King, Petrova's third loss to the duo in the last four Grand Slams.

At Eastbourne, Petrova lost to seventh seed Samantha Stosur in the first round. She then reached the fourth round at Wimbledon, after defeating Vesna Dolonc, 14th seed Anastasia Pavlyuchenkova and Kateryna Bondarenko. She consequently lost to Victoria Azarenka in straight sets. In doubles, Petrova and Rodionova reached the quarterfinals where they lost to Samantha Stosur and Sabine Lisicki. Petrova kicked off her US Open series campaign with a bang by winning the inaugural Washington Open. She defeated Alexandra Mueller, 17 year-old phenom Eugenie Bouchard, Bojana Jovanovski, and top seed Shahar Pe'er in the final, winning her tenth career singles title and her first in nearly three years. In Toronto, she lost in the second round to third seed Vera Zvonareva. The following week at Cincinnati, Petrova managed to reach the quarterfinals after defeating Vinci, Ivanovic and Christina McHale. There, she lost to Andrea Petkovic. The week before the US Open, Petrova lost to Polona Hercog in the first round at New Haven. At the US Open, Petrova lost to ninth seed and eventual champion Stosur in the third round in a marathon three-set match. At three hours and 16 minutes in length, it was (at that time) the longest women's singles match in US Open history. Petrova chose to reunite with Maria Kirilenko in doubles; the pair reached the semifinals before falling to defending champions Shvedova and King, her fourth loss to the duo in the last six majors.

At the China Open, Petrova an opening round loss to Klára Zakopalová. At the Kremlin Cup, she defeated Evgeniya Rodina before losing to Vera Dushevina in the second round. Petrova qualified for the Tournament of Champions in Bali. She advanced to the semifinals where she lost to Ivanovic. While Petrova capped off the year finishing at No. 29 for her ninth consecutive top 30 year-end singles ranking, her 25 match wins were the fewest she had recorded in a season since 2002.

=== 2012: Major bounce-back in singles and doubles ===
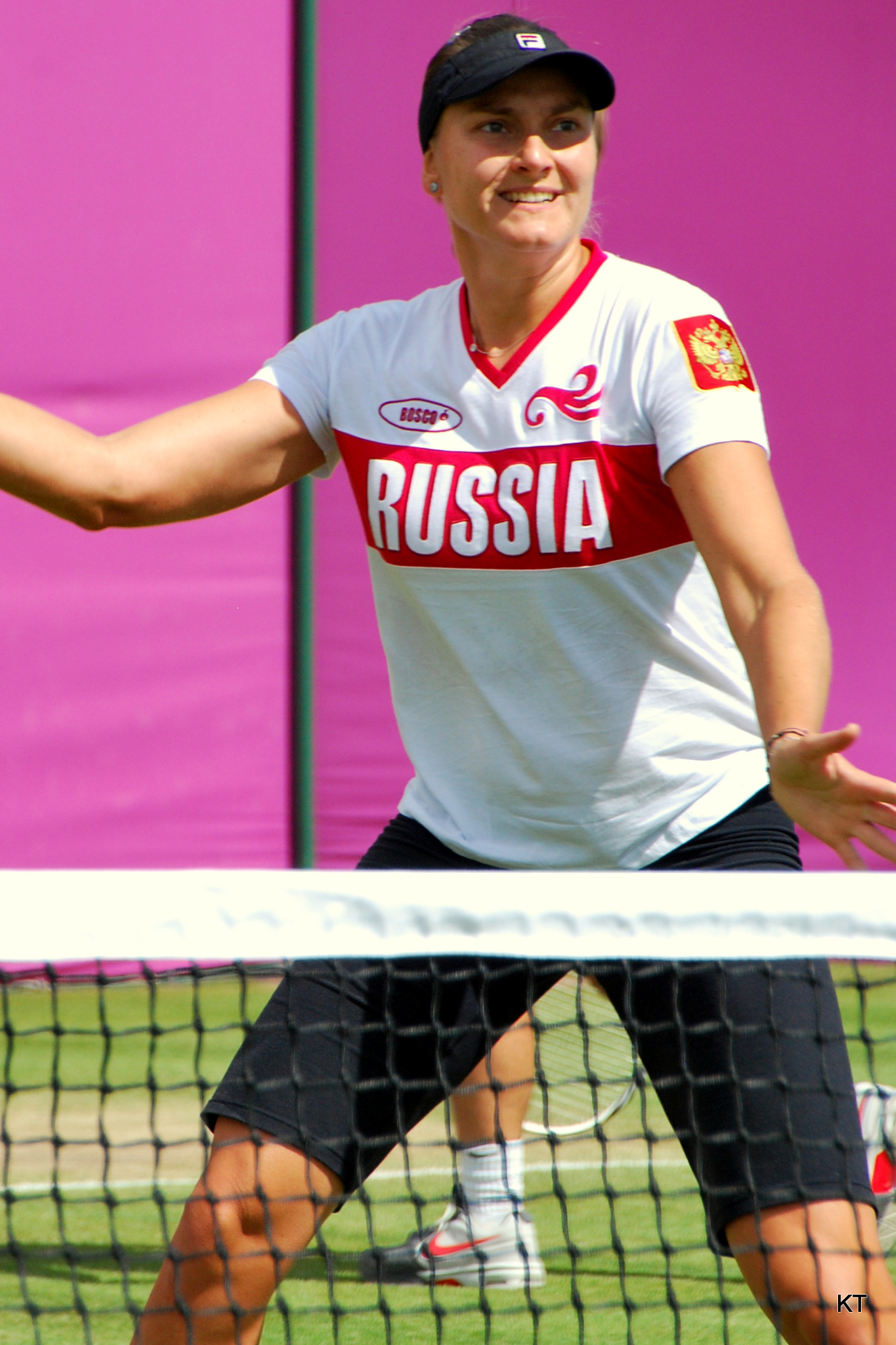
Petrova at the 2012 Summer Olympics

Petrova began the 2012 season playing doubles at the Sydney International. Seeded fourth with her partner, Maria Kirilenko, they lost in the semifinals to second seeds Liezel Huber/Lisa Raymond. Seeded 29th at the Australian Open, she defeated qualifier Andrea Hlaváčková in the first round. Petrova lost in the second round to Sara Errani. In doubles, she and Kirilenko retired from their third-round match between Irina-Camelia Begu/Monica Niculescu.

Playing for Russia in the Fed Cup tie versus Spain, Petrova played one rubber and lost to Carla Suárez Navarro. Despite her loss, Russia ended up beating Spain 3-2 to move on to the semifinals versus Serbia. Petrova failed to gain traction in singles over the remainder of the early hardcourt season, but won the doubles title in Miami with Maria Kirilenko over the Italian team of Sara Errani and Roberta Vinci. This marked Petrova's 20th career doubles title and her first at a Premier Mandatory event.

She began the clay-court season at the Family Circle Cup where she was seeded 13th. She upset eighth seed Anastasia Pavlyuchenkova in the third round. She lost in the quarterfinals to Polona Hercog, 1–6, 2–6. Her next tournament was the Estoril Open, where she lost as the seventh seed in the quarterfinals to the top seed Roberta Vinci, 2–6, 6–1, 4–6. The rest of her clay-court season was dismal, with a 3–3 win–loss record from Madrid through Brussels. She was the 27th seed at the French Open and lost in the third round to sixth seed Sam Stosur, 3–6, 3–6. In doubles, Petrova reached her second career Grand Slam final with Kirilenko, but lost to Errani and Vinci in a rematch of the Miami Open final.

Her only Wimbledon warm-up tournament was the Rosmalen Open, where she was seeded eighth. She beat Kiki Bertens in the first round, Anabel Medina Garrigues in the second round, and third seed Dominika Cibulková in the quarterfinals to reach her first semifinal of the year. There she defeated Kirsten Flipkens, 6–4, 6–2. In this, her first WTA final of the year, she defeated Urszula Radwańska, 6–4, 6–3 to win her 11th career WTA singles title. It was her first career title on grass, and she also bounced back inside the top 20, the first time she had been there since March 2011. In doubles, Petrova and Kirilenko reached the final, but again were defeated by Errani and Vinci. She then played at Wimbledon, where she lost in the third round to Camila Giorgi, 3–6, 6–7. This was the second time she had lost to Giorgi this year.

Petrova reached the semifinals of the Mercury Insurance Open in Carlsbad, losing to Dominika Cibulková, 6–7, 1–6. She then travelled back to Europe to play at the 2012 Summer Olympics in London, which was being held at Wimbledon. In singles, she was defeated by top seed Victoria Azarenka in the third round. In doubles with Kirilenko, the duo lost to defending (and eventual) gold medalists Serena and Venus Williams in the semifinals, but came back from a set down to defeat the No. 1 seeds, Liezel Huber and Lisa Raymond, to win the bronze medal. After first round exits in Montreal and Cincinnati, Petrova reached the fourth round at the US Open, where she fell to third seed and compatriot Maria Sharapova, despite being up 2–0 in the deciding set.

After the US Open, Petrova entered the Pan Pacific Open and was seeded 17th. In the first round, she swept past Peng of China with a comfortable win. In the second round, she faced Romanian Simona Halep, whom she defeated. In the third round, she faced a tough battle against Petra Martić, but eventually prevailed. In the quarterfinals, Petrova upset the sixth seed Sara Errani. Next she faced the eighth seed Sam Stosur, whom she eventually defeated comfortably. This meant that Petrova reached her second final of the year, where she faced third seed Agnieszka Radwańska, the defending champion. In the final, Petrova defeated Radwańska, 6–0, 1–6, 6–3, to win her biggest tournament to date. This was Petrova's 12th career singles title. After reaching the final in Moscow with Kirilenko, the pair qualified for the Tour Championships in Istanbul to compete in doubles. The pair caused a major upset by defeating world No. 1 pairing Errani/Vinci in the semifinals, then followed it up by beating the second seeded Czech team Andrea Hlaváčková and Lucie Hradecká to win the title. This marked Petrova's second WTA Tour Championship crown in doubles, after winning in 2004, and enabled her to finish with her best ever year-end doubles ranking of world No. 5. She then traveled to Sofia to compete in the Tournament of Champions for the first time. After winning all three of her round-robin matches, she beat Vinci in the semifinals in three sets, and Caroline Wozniacki in the final to win her 13th career WTA singles title and her third of the year. This helped Petrova finish the year ranked No. 12 in the world in singles, her highest since 2008.

=== 2013: Downfall ===
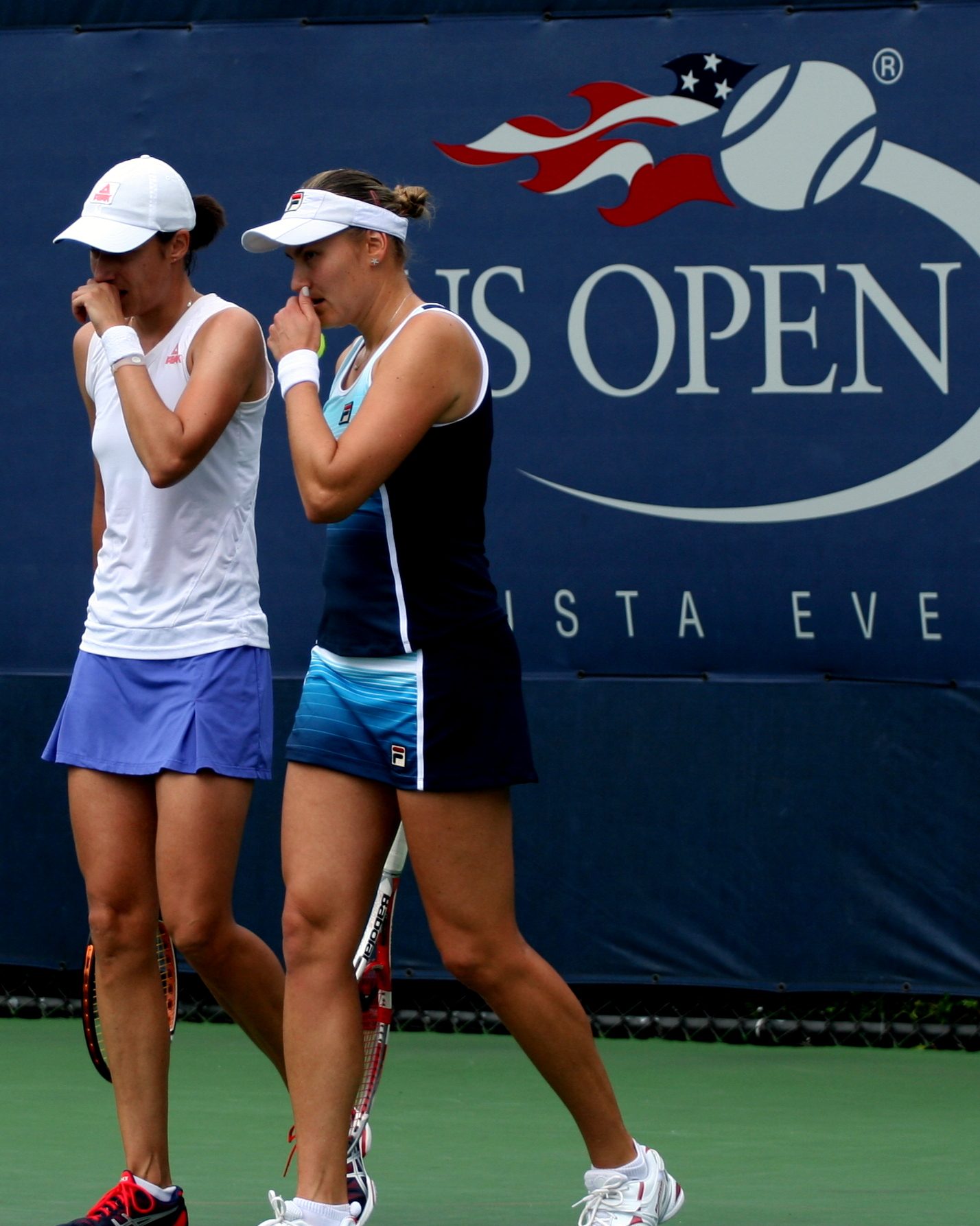
Petrova with Katarina Srebotnik at the 2013 US Open

Petrova began season as the eighth seed at Sydney and lost in the first round to Roberta Vinci. However, in doubles, she and Katarina Srebotnik won the title, defeating top seeds Errani/Vinci in the final. Seeded 12th at the Australian Open, Petrova suffered a first-round upset at the hands of world No. 100 and 42 year old Kimiko Date-Krumm. Seeded fifth in doubles with Katarina Srebotnik, they lost in the third round to 12th seeds Serena & Venus Williams.

In February, Petrova competed at the Qatar Ladies Open. Seeded 11th, she won her first two rounds over Andrea Hlaváčková and Hsieh Su-wei. Petrova was defeated in the third round by seventh seed Petra Kvitová. Seeded second in doubles with Katarina Srebotnik, they lost in the final to top seeds Errani/Vinci. Next, Petrova played at the Dubai Championships. She advanced to the quarterfinals after wins over Dominika Cibulková and lucky loser Carla Suárez Navarro. She lost in her quarterfinal match to fifth seed and eventual finalist Sara Errani. In doubles, she and Srebotnik were defeated in the final by Bethanie Mattek-Sands/Sania Mirza. In March, Petrova played at Indian Wells. As the tenth seed, she won her first two rounds over lucky loser Stefanie Vögele and twenty-first seed Julia Görges. She was defeated in the fourth round by eighth seed Caroline Wozniacki. In doubles, she and Srebotnik lost in the final to Ekaterina Makarova/Elena Vesnina. Seeded 11th at Miami, Petrova lost in the third round to twenty-second seed Jelena Janković. In doubles, she and Srebotnik won the title beating Lisa Raymond/Laura Robson in the final.

Petrova began her clay-court season at the Porsche Grand Prix. Seeded eighth, she won her first-round match over German qualifier Dinah Pfizenmaier. In the second round, she was defeated by Ana Ivanovic. Seeded second in doubles with Srebotnik, they suffered a first-round upset at the hands of Bethanie Mattek-Sands/Sania Mirza. In May, Petrova competed at the Madrid Open. Seeded 11th, she earned a first-round victory over Italian qualifier Camila Giorgi. She lost in the second round to Svetlana Kuznetsova. Seeded second in doubles with Srebotnik, they were upset in the second round by Janette Husárová/Sabine Lisicki. Petrova played her final tournament before the French Open at the Italian Open. Seeded 11th, she lost in the first round to Carla Suárez Navarro. In doubles, she and Srebotnik suffered a semifinal upset at the hands of Hsieh/Peng. At the French Open, Petrova was the 11th seed. She suffered a first-round upset at the hands of world No. 86, Monica Puig. In doubles, she and Srebotnik were defeated in the semifinals by Sara Errani/Roberta Vinci.

Petrova only played one grass-court tournament leading up to Wimbledon. Seeded eighth at Eastbourne, she lost in the first round to wildcard Sam Stosur. In doubles, she and Srebotnik won the title defeating Monica Niculescu/Klára Zakopalová in the final. Seeded 13th at Wimbledon, Petrova was stunned in the first round by world No. 77, Karolína Plíšková. In doubles, she and Srebotnik were defeated in the quarterfinals by seventh seeds Grönefeld/Peschke.

Petrova withdrew from the Washington Open due to a hip injury. Petrova then missed the Canadian Open and the Cincinnati Open due to a left leg injury. Seeded 20th at the US Open, she lost in the first round to qualifier Julia Glushko. In doubles, she and Srebotnik lost in the quarterfinals to fifth seeds Andrea Hlaváčková/Lucie Hradecká.

Petrova withdrew from the Pan Pacific Open, the tournament she won last year, due to her hip injury. She also missed the China Open due to the same injury. Petrova returned for the Luxembourg Open. Only playing doubles at this event, she and Srebotnik lost in the semifinals to Kristina Barrois/Laura Thorpe. Petrova played in her final tournament of the year at the Tour Championships since she and her doubles partner qualified. Despite being the defending champion, she and Srebotnik lost in the quarterfinals to eventual champions Hsieh/Peng.

Petrova ended the year ranked 102 in singles and No. 8 in doubles.

=== 2014: Out of top 300 ===
Petrova withdrew from the Australian Open due to the death of her mother.

Petrova played in her first tournament of the year at Paris. She lost in the second round of qualifying to Dinah Pfizenmaier. Partnering with compatriot Anastasia Pavlyuchenkova in doubles, they lost in the first round to Monica Niculescu/Klára Zakopalová. Petrova qualified for the Qatar Ladies Open defeating Marta Domachowska and Yuliya Beygelzimer. She was defeated in the first round by Peng Shuai. In doubles, she and Pavlyuchenkova lost in the semifinals to second seeds Hsieh/Peng. Playing as a wildcard in Dubai, Petrova was defeated in the first round by Suárez Navarro. In doubles, she and Pavlyuchenkova lost in the first round to top seeds Errani/Vinci. In March, Petrova competed at Indian Wells. She retired during her first-round match against Sílvia Soler Espinosa due to a lower right leg injury. In Miami, Petrova got her first WTA Tour singles victory of the season when she beat Urszula Radwańska in the first round. She was defeated in the second by 14th seed Sabine Lisicki.

Playing as a wildcard at the Family Circle Cup, Petrova was ousted from the tournament in the first round by Marina Erakovic. Partnering with Mirjana Lučić-Baroni in doubles, they lost in the first round to Alla Kudryavtseva/Anastasia Rodionova.

Petrova did not play any more tournaments for the rest of the year. As a result, she dropped out of the top 300 in singles. She ended the year ranked 374 in singles and 174 in doubles.

=== 2015-2016 ===
Petrova did not play during the 2015 or 2016 season.

=== 2017: Retirement ===
On 11 January 2017, Petrova announced her retirement from tennis due to injury struggles.

== Career statistics ==
=== Grand Slam tournament finals ===
==== Doubles: 2 (2 runner-ups) ====
Result	Year	Championship	Surface	Partner	Opponents	Score
Loss	2010	US Open	Hard	(United States) Liezel Huber	(United States) Vania King (Kazakhstan) Yaroslava Shvedova	6–2, 4–6, 6–7^{(4–7)}
Loss	2012	French Open	Clay	(Russia) Maria Kirilenko	(Italy) Sara Errani (Italy) Roberta Vinci	6–4, 4–6, 2–6

=== Year-end championships finals ===
==== Doubles: 2 (2 titles) ====
Result	Year	Championship	Surface	Partner	Opponents	Score
Win	2004	WTA Championships, Los Angeles	Hard (i)	(United States) Meghann Shaughnessy	(Zimbabwe) Cara Black (Australia) Rennae Stubbs	7–5, 6–2
Win	2012	Tour Championships, Istanbul	Hard (i)	(Russia) Maria Kirilenko	(Czech Republic) Andrea Hlaváčková (Czech Republic) Lucie Hradecká	6–1, 6–4

== Grand Slam performance timelines ==
Key
W	F	SF	QF	#R	RR	Q#	DNQ	A	NH

(W) winner; (F) finalist; (SF) semifinalist; (QF) quarterfinalist; (#R) rounds 4, 3, 2, 1; (RR) round-robin stage; (Q#) qualification round; (DNQ) did not qualify; (A) absent; (NH) not held; (SR) strike rate (events won / competed); (W–L) win–loss record.

=== Singles ===
Tournament	1996	1997	1998	1999	2000	2001	2002	2003	2004	2005	2006	2007	2008	2009	2010	2011	2012	2013	2014	SR	W–L	Win %
Australian Open	A	A	A	1R	3R	2R	A	3R	1R	4R	QF	3R	4R	4R	QF	3R	2R	1R	A	0 / 14	27–14	66%
French Open	A	A	A	Q1	1R	4R	A	SF	3R	SF	1R	1R	3R	2R	QF	1R	3R	1R	A	0 / 13	24–13	65%
Wimbledon	A	A	A	2R	2R	4R	A	3R	4R	QF	A	4R	QF	4R	3R	4R	3R	1R	A	0 / 13	31–13	70%
US Open	A	A	Q3	Q2	2R	2R	1R	4R	QF	QF	3R	3R	3R	4R	1R	3R	4R	1R	A	0 / 14	27–14	66%
Win–loss	0–0	0–0	0–0	1–2	4–4	8–4	0–1	12–4	9–4	16–4	6–3	7–4	11–4	10–4	10–4	7–4	8–4	0–4	0–0	0 / 54	109–54	67%
Career statistics
Titles	0	0	0	0	0	0	0	0	0	1	5	1	2	0	0	1	3	0	0	Career total: 13		
Finals	0	0	0	0	0	0	0	1	1	3	7	3	4	0	1	1	3	0	0	Career total: 24		
Year-end ranking	N/A	589	142	95	62	39	111	12	12	9	6	14	11	20	15	29	12	102	374	$12,466,924		

=== Doubles ===
Tournament	1998	1999	2000	2001	2002	2003	2004	2005	2006	2007	2008	2009	2010	2011	2012	2013	2014	SR	W–L	Win %
Australian Open	A	A	A	1R	A	QF	3R	A	A	A	2R	1R	1R	SF	3R	3R	A	0 / 9	14–9	61%
French Open	A	A	2R	2R	A	3R	QF	SF	A	A	1R	QF	3R	QF	F	SF	A	0 / 11	28–11	72%
Wimbledon	A	2R	A	3R	A	2R	QF	QF	A	QF	A	3R	3R	QF	2R	QF	A	0 / 11	24–11	69%
US Open	A	A	2R	2R	SF	3R	2R	3R	QF	A	2R	QF	F	SF	QF	QF	A	0 / 13	32–13	71%
Win–loss	0–0	1–1	2–2	4–4	4–1	8–4	9–4	9–3	3–1	3–1	2–3	8–4	9–4	13–4	11–4	12–4	0–0	0 / 44	98–44	69%
Year-end championships
WTA Finals	A	A	A	A	A	A	W	A	A	A	A	A	A	A	W	SF	A	2 / 3	4–1	80%
Career statistics
Titles	0	0	0	2	1	1	7	0	1	0	3	3	1	0	2	3	0	Career total: 24		
Finals	0	0	0	4	3	4	7	1	2	0	4	3	5	2	7	6	0	Career total: 48		
Year-end ranking	151	151	140	41	21	13	7	33	23	57	20	16	8	13	5	8	174			

Awards and achievements
Preceded by (Slovakia) Daniela Hantuchová	WTA Most Improved Player of the Year; 2003	Succeeded by (Russia) Maria Sharapova
