= 2009 Generali Ladies Linz =

- Date: 10–18 October
- Edition: 23rd
- Category: WTA International
- Draw: 32S / 16D
- Prize money: $220,000
- Surface: Hard
- Location: Linz, Austria
- Venue: TipsArena Linz

Champions

Singles
- (Belgium) Yanina Wickmayer

Doubles
- (Germany) Anna-Lena Grönefeld / (Slovenia) Katarina Srebotnik
← 2008 ·	Generali Ladies Linz	· 2010 →

The 2009 Generali Ladies Linz was a women's tennis tournament played on indoor hard courts. It was the 23rd edition of the Generali Ladies Linz, and was part of the WTA International tournaments of the 2009 WTA Tour. It was held at the TipsArena Linz in Linz, Austria, from 10 October until 18 October 2009. Third-seeded Yanina Wickmayer won the singles title.

== Finals ==
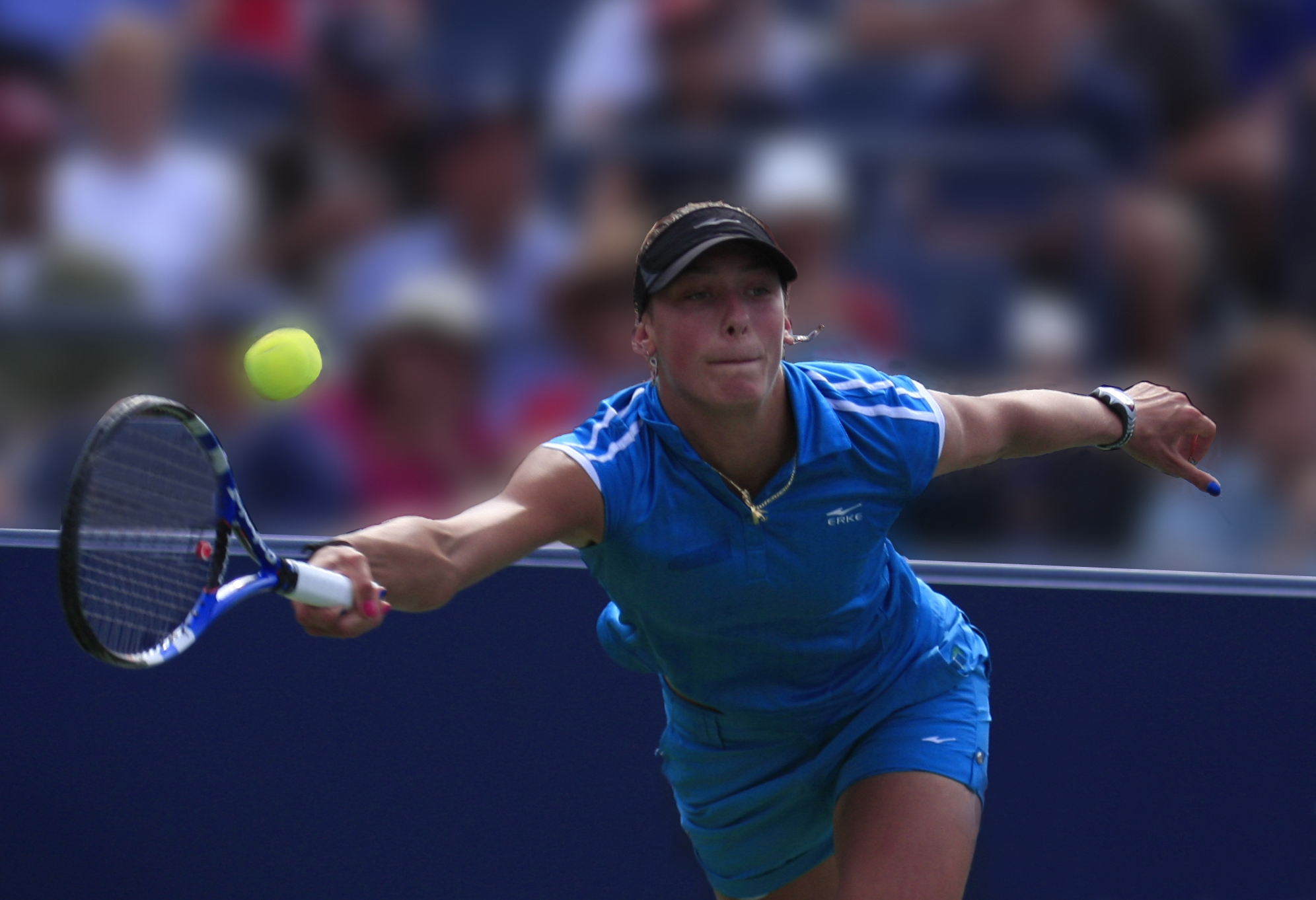
Yanina Wickmayer volley

=== Singles ===
(Belgium) Yanina Wickmayer defeated (Czech Republic) Petra Kvitová, 6–3, 6-4

- It was Wickmayer's second title of the year and career.

=== Doubles ===
(Germany) Anna-Lena Grönefeld / (Slovenia) Katarina Srebotnik defeated (Poland) Klaudia Jans / (Poland) Alicja Rosolska, 6–1, 6-4

== WTA players ==
=== Seeds ===
Country	Player	Rank^{1}	Seed
ITA	Flavia Pennetta	10	1
POL	Agnieszka Radwańska	11	2
BEL	Yanina Wickmayer	25	3
ESP	Carla Suárez Navarro	30	4
CZE	Iveta Benešová	33	5
ROU	Sorana Cîrstea	36	6
CZE	Lucie Šafářová	41	7
ITA	Sara Errani	44	8

- Seeds are based on the rankings of October 5, 2009

=== Other entrants ===
The following players received wildcards into the singles main draw:

- (Austria) Patricia Mayr
- (Austria) Yvonne Meusburger
- (Belgium) Yanina Wickmayer

The following players received entry from the qualifying draw:

- (Germany) Stephanie Gehrlein
- (Germany) Julia Görges
- (Croatia) Petra Martić
- (France) Aravane Rezaï
