= 2007 Generali Ladies Linz =

- Date: 22–28 October
- Edition: 21st
- Category: Tier II Series
- Draw: 28S / 16D
- Prize money: $600,000
- Surface: Hard (indoor)
- Location: Linz, Austria
- Venue: TipsArena Linz

Champions

Singles
- (Slovakia) Daniela Hantuchová

Doubles
- (Zimbabwe) Cara Black / (United States) Liezel Huber
← 2006 ·	Linz Open	· 2008 →

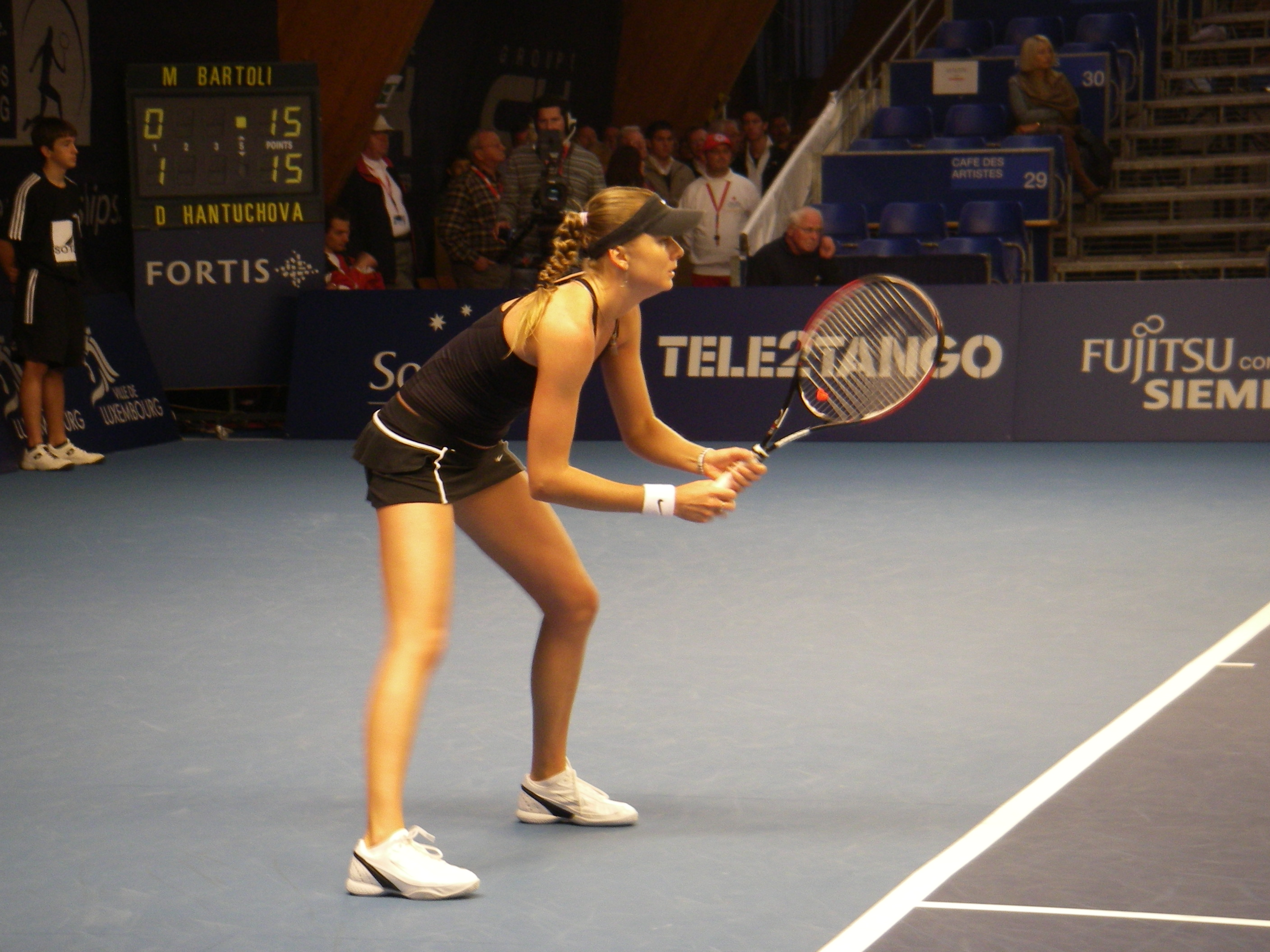
2007 Generali Ladies Linz

The 2007 Generali Ladies Linz is the 2007 Tier II WTA Tour tournament of the annually-held Generali Ladies Linz tennis tournament. It was the 21st edition of the tournament and was held from 22 October until 28 October 2007 at the TipsArena Linz. Second-seeded Daniela Hantuchová won the singles title.

The total prize pot for the tournament was US$600,000 with the winner of the singles receiving $88,265 and the losing finalist $47,125. The winners of the doubles competition received $27,730.

== Finals ==
=== Singles ===
(Slovakia) Daniela Hantuchová defeated (Switzerland) Patty Schnyder 6–4, 6–2

- It was Hantuchová's second title of the year, and 3rd of her career.

=== Doubles ===
(Zimbabwe) Cara Black / (United States) Liezel Huber defeated (Slovenia) Katarina Srebotnik / (Japan) Ai Sugiyama 6–2, 3–6, 10–8
