= 2007 Generali Ladies Linz – Doubles =

Doubles
- 2007 Generali Ladies Linz

Final
- Champions: (Zimbabwe) Cara Black (United States) Liezel Huber
- Runners-up: (Slovenia) Katarina Srebotnik (Japan) Ai Sugiyama
- Score: 6–2, 3–6, 10–8

Details
- Draw: 16
- Seeds: 4

Events
Singles	Doubles
← 2006 ·	Linz Open	· 2008 →

The doubles Tournament at the 2007 Generali Ladies Linz took place between 22 and 28 October on the indoor hard courts of the TipsArena Linz in Linz, Austria. Cara Black and Liezel Huber won the title, defeating Katarina Srebotnik and Ai Sugiyama in the final.

== Seeds ==
1. (Zimbabwe) Cara Black / (United States) Liezel Huber (champions)
2. (Slovenia) Katarina Srebotnik / (Japan) Ai Sugiyama (final)
3. (Australia) Alicia Molik / (Italy) Mara Santangelo (semifinals)
4. (Czech Republic) Květa Peschke / (Australia) Rennae Stubbs (semifinals)

== Draw ==
=== Key ===
- Q = Qualifier
- WC = Wild card
- LL = Lucky loser
- Alt = Alternate
- ITF = ITF entry
- PR = Protected ranking
- SR = Special ranking
- SE = Special exempt
- JE = Junior exempt
- JR = Junior Accelerator Programme entrant
- CO = College Accelerator Programme entrant
- NG = Next Gen Accelerator Program entrant
- w/o = Walkover
- r = Retired
- d = Defaulted

First round
1	(Zimbabwe) C Black (United States) L Huber	6	6
WC	(Spain) A Medina Garrigues (Italy) F Pennetta	3	2
(Ukraine) A Bondarenko (Ukraine) K Bondarenko	7	6
(Russia) M Kirilenko (Russia) E Vesnina	6^{1}	1
3	(Australia) A Molik (Italy) M Santangelo	6	6
(Poland) K Jans (Poland) A Rosolska	3	2
WC	(Austria) S Bammer (Austria) T Paszek	4	3
(China) S Peng (Poland) A Radwańska	6	6
(Germany) M Müller (Czech Republic) G Navrátilová	2	6	[3]
(Netherlands) M Krajicek (Czech Republic) V Uhlířová	6	4	[10]
(Russia) V Dushevina (Russia) G Voskoboeva	3	4
4	(Czech Republic) K Peschke (Australia) R Stubbs	6	6
(Argentina) G Dulko (Russia) D Safina	6	6^{3}	[10]
WC	(South Africa) K Anderson (Switzerland) P Schnyder	4	7	[5]
(Greece) E Daniilidou (Germany) J Wöhr	2	3
2	(Slovenia) K Srebotnik (Japan) A Sugiyama	6	6

Quarterfinals
1	(Zimbabwe) C Black (United States) L Huber	w/o
(Ukraine) A Bondarenko (Ukraine) K Bondarenko
3	(Australia) A Molik (Italy) M Santangelo	w/o
(China) S Peng (Poland) A Radwańska
(Netherlands) M Krajicek (Czech Republic) V Uhlířová	3	3
4	(Czech Republic) K Peschke (Australia) R Stubbs	6	6
(Argentina) G Dulko (Russia) D Safina
2	(Slovenia) K Srebotnik (Japan) A Sugiyama	w/o

Semifinals
1	(Zimbabwe) C Black (United States) L Huber	5	6	[10]
3	(Australia) A Molik (Italy) M Santangelo	7	2	[4]
4	(Czech Republic) K Peschke (Australia) R Stubbs	6^{3}	6	[6]
2	(Slovenia) K Srebotnik (Japan) A Sugiyama	7	4	[10]

Final
1	(Zimbabwe) C Black (United States) L Huber	6	3	[10]
2	(Slovenia) K Srebotnik (Japan) A Sugiyama	2	6	[8]
