= 2007 Generali Ladies Linz – Singles =

Singles
- 2007 Generali Ladies Linz

Final
- Champion: (Slovakia) Daniela Hantuchová
- Runner-up: (Switzerland) Patty Schnyder
- Score: 6–4, 6–2

Details
- Draw: 28
- Seeds: 8

Events
Singles	Doubles
← 2006 ·	Linz Open	· 2008 →

Maria Sharapova was the defending champion, but did not participate.

Daniela Hantuchová won the title, defeating Patty Schnyder in the final 6–4, 6–2.

== Seeds ==
1. (Russia) Anna Chakvetadze (quarterfinals)
2. (Slovakia) Daniela Hantuchová (champion)
3. (France) Marion Bartoli (semifinals)
4. (Russia) Dinara Safina (quarterfinals)
5. (Czech Republic) Nicole Vaidišová (semifinals)
6. (Switzerland) Patty Schnyder (finals)
7. (France) Tatiana Golovin (first round)
8. (Austria) Sybille Bammer (first round)

== Draws ==
=== Key ===
- Q – Qualifier
- WC – Wild Card

=== Finals ===
Semifinals
6	(Switzerland) Patty Schnyder	7^{7}	6
3	(France) Marion Bartoli	6^{5}	3
5	(Czech Republic) Nicole Vaidišová	6	2	6^{3}
2	(Slovakia) Daniela Hantuchová	2	6	7^{7}

Final
6	(Switzerland) Patty Schnyder	4	2
2	(Slovakia) Daniela Hantuchová	6	6

=== Section 1 ===
First round
(Italy) F Schiavone	7^{8}	6
(Slovenia) K Srebotnik	6^{6}	3
Q	(Australia) A Molik	6	3	6
(Poland) A Radwańska	4	6	1
Q	(France) A Rezaï	4	3
6	(Switzerland) P Schnyder	6	6
(Austria) T Paszek	6	7
(Spain) AM Garrigues	3	5
(Russia) M Kirilenko	5	7^{7}	4
(Ukraine) J Vakulenko	7	6^{0}	6
(Japan) A Sugiyama	2	7^{7}	6
8	(Austria) S Bammer	6	6^{5}	0

Second round
1	(Russia) A Chakvetadze	6	6
(Italy) F Schiavone	0	2
Q	(Australia) A Molik	4	4
6	(Switzerland) P Schnyder	6	6
3	(France) M Bartoli	6	6
(Austria) T Paszek	2	1
(Ukraine) J Vakulenko	6	6
(Japan) A Sugiyama	0	2

Quarter-Finals
1	(Russia) A Chakvetadze	1	0
6	(Switzerland) P Schnyder	6	6
3	(France) M Bartoli	6	1	6
(Ukraine) J Vakulenko	1	6	4

Semi-Finals
6	(Switzerland) P Schnyder	7^{7}	6
3	(France) M Bartoli	6^{5}	3

=== Section 2 ===
First round
5	(Czech Republic) N Vaidišová	4	6	7^{7}
WC	(Italy) F Pennetta	6	3	6^{4}
WC	(Austria) Y Meusburger	6^{2}	6	6
WC	(Austria) M Klaffner	7^{7}	4	3
(Netherlands) M Krajicek	6	4	6^{4}
Q	(Italy) K Knapp	4	6	7^{7}
7	(France) T Golovin	4	1	r
(Greece) E Daniilidou	6	0
(Germany) M Müller	3	0
(Ukraine) A Bondarenko	6	6
Q	(Bosnia and Herzegovina) S Martinović	3	3
(Argentina) G Dulko	6	6

Second round
5	(Czech Republic) N Vaidišová	6	6
WC	(Austria) Y Meusburger	3	1
Q	(Italy) K Knapp	2	2
4	(Russia) D Safina	6	6
(Greece) E Daniilidou	4	3
(Ukraine) A Bondarenko	6	6
(Argentina) G Dulko	3	1
2	(Slovakia) D Hantuchová	6	6

Quarter-Finals
5	(Czech Republic) N Vaidišová	6	7^{9}
4	(Russia) D Safina	3	6^{7}
(Ukraine) A Bondarenko	4	6	3
2	(Slovakia) D Hantuchová	6	1	6

Semi-Finals
5	(Czech Republic) N Vaidišová	6	2	6^{3}
2	(Slovakia) D Hantuchová	2	6	7^{7}
