= 2010 Generali Ladies Linz =

- Date: 9–17 October
- Edition: 24th
- Category: WTA International
- Draw: 32S / 16D
- Prize money: $220,000
- Surface: Hard
- Location: Linz, Austria
- Venue: TipsArena Linz

Champions

Singles
- (Serbia) Ana Ivanovic

Doubles
- (Czech Republic) Renata Voráčová / (Czech Republic) Barbora Záhlavová-Strýcová
- Generali Ladies Linz

The 2010 Generali Ladies Linz was a women's tennis tournament played on indoor hard courts. It was the 24th edition of the Generali Ladies Linz, and part of the WTA International tournaments of the 2010 WTA Tour. It was held at the TipsArena Linz in Linz, Austria, from 9 October until 17 October 2010. Seventh-seeded Ana Ivanovic won the singles title.

World No. 1 Serena Williams was due to make her comeback from foot surgery at this tournament, but she withdrew after reaggregating the injury at training. Her original wildcard slot was therefore given to Ana Ivanovic. Agnieszka Radwańska also withdrew from the tournament due to a stress fracture in her foot.

Ivanovic won the title, defeating Patty Schnyder in the championship match which lasted 47 minutes; it was the shortest championship match of the season. The victory also ended a two-year title drought, and raised her ranking up from world No. 36 to world No. 26.

== Finals ==
=== Singles ===
(Serbia) Ana Ivanovic defeated (Switzerland) Patty Schnyder, 6–1, 6–2

- It was Ivanovic's first title of the year, her first in two years, and the ninth of her career.

=== Doubles ===
(Czech Republic) Renata Voráčová / (Czech Republic) Barbora Záhlavová-Strýcová defeated (Czech Republic) Květa Peschke / (Slovenia) Katarina Srebotnik, 7–5, 7–6(6)

== WTA players ==
=== Seeds ===
| Country | Player | Rank^{1} | Seed |
|---|---|---|---|
| USA | ~~Serena Williams~~ | ~~1~~ | ~~1~~ |
| SVK | Daniela Hantuchová | 29 | 2 |
| UKR | Alona Bondarenko | 31 | 3 |
| SVK | Dominika Cibulková | 33 | 4 |
| CZE | Petra Kvitová | 34 | 5 |
| GER | Andrea Petkovic | 35 | 6 |
| SRB | Ana Ivanovic | 36 | 7 |
| CZE | Klára Zakopalová | 38 | 8 |
| ITA | Sara Errani | 40 | 9 |

- Seeds are based on the rankings of October 4, 2010.

=== Other entrants ===
The following players received wildcards into the singles main draw:

- (Austria) Sybille Bammer
- (Serbia) Ana Ivanovic^{1}
- (Austria) Yvonne Meusburger
- ~~(United States) Serena Williams~~

^{1} Ana Ivanovic received the wildcard originally allocated to Serena Williams after the latter withdrew from the tournament due to ongoing foot surgery.

The following players received entry from the qualifying draw:

- (Greece) Eleni Daniilidou
- (Slovenia) Polona Hercog
- (Kazakhstan) Sesil Karatantcheva
- (Czech Republic) Renata Voráčová

The following player received entry as a lucky loser into the singles main draw:

- (Romania) Sorana Cîrstea

=== Withdrawals ===
- (United States) Serena Williams
- (Poland) Agnieszka Radwańska
