= 2005 Generali Ladies Linz =

Women's tennis tournament

- Date: 22–30 October
- Edition: 19th
- Category: Tier II Series
- Draw: 32S / 16D
- Prize money: USD585,000
- Surface: Hard (indoor)
- Location: Linz, Austria
- Venue: TipsArena Linz

Champions

Singles
- (Russia) Nadia Petrova

Doubles
- (Argentina) Gisela Dulko / (Czech Republic) Květa Peschke
- Linz Open

The 2005 Generali Ladies Linz is the 2005 Tier II WTA Tour tournament of the annually-held Generali Ladies Linz tennis tournament. It was the 20th edition of the tournament and was held from 22 October until 30 October 2005 at the TipsArena Linz. Third-seeded Nadia Petrova won the singles title.

== Finals ==
=== Singles ===
(Russia) Nadia Petrova defeated (Switzerland) Patty Schnyder, 4–6, 6–3, 6–1

- It was Petrova's first WTA singles title.

=== Doubles ===
(Argentina) Gisela Dulko / (Czech Republic) Květa Peschke defeated (Spain) Conchita Martínez / (Spain) Virginia Ruano Pascual, 6–2, 6–3

- It was the 4th title of both Dulko and Peschke's careers, and their only title together as a pair.

== Points and prize money ==
=== Point distribution ===
Event	W	F	SF	QF	Round of 16	Round of 32	Q	Q3	Q2	Q1
Singles	195	137	88	49	25	1	11.75	6.75	4	1
Doubles	195	137	88	49	1	—N/a	11.75	—N/a	—N/a	—N/a

=== Prize money ===
Event	W	F	SF	QF	Round of 16	Round of 32	Q3	Q2	Q1
Singles	$95,500	$51,000	$27,300	$14,600	$7,820	$4,175	$2,230	$1,195	$640
Doubles *	$30,000	$16,120	$8,620	$4,610	$2,465	—N/a	—N/a	—N/a	—N/a

_{* per team}

== Singles main draw entrants ==
=== Seeds ===
Country	Player	Rank	Seed
~~FRA~~	~~Amélie Mauresmo~~	~~4~~	~~1~~
RUS	Elena Dementieva	8	2
RUS	Nadia Petrova	9	3
SUI	Patty Schnyder	10	4
RUS	Elena Likhovtseva	16	5
SVK	Daniela Hantuchová	19	6
SCG	Jelena Janković	21	7
SCG	Ana Ivanovic	22	8
FRA	Tatiana Golovin	24	9

Rankings are as of 17 October 2005.

=== Other entrants ===
The following players received wildcards into the singles main draw:

- (Austria) Sybille Bammer
- (United States) Lisa Raymond

The following players received entry from the qualifying draw:

- (Sweden) Sofia Arvidsson
- (Poland) Marta Domachowska
- (Czech Republic) Barbora Strýcová
- (Russia) Elena Vesnina

The following player received entry as a lucky loser:

- (Austria) Yvonne Meusburger

=== Withdrawals ===
- (United States) Jennifer Capriati → replaced by (France) Marion Bartoli
- (Germany) Anna-Lena Grönefeld → replaced by (Russia) Vera Dushevina
- (Belgium) Justine Henin → replaced by (Czech Republic) Iveta Benešová
- (France) Amélie Mauresmo → replaced by (Austria) Yvonne Meusburger
- (Italy) Flavia Pennetta → replaced by (Czech Republic) Klára Koukalová
- (France) Mary Pierce → replaced by (France) Virginie Razzano
- (United States) Chanda Rubin → replaced by (United States) Lisa Raymond

=== Retirements ===
- (Spain) Conchita Martínez (Achilles tendon strain)

== Doubles main draw entrants ==
=== Seeds ===
Country	Player	Country	Player	Player 1 Rank	Player 2 Rank	Seed
ZIM	Cara Black	AUS	Rennae Stubbs	2	5	1
ESP	Conchita Martínez	ESP	Virginia Ruano Pascual	14	2	2
RUS	Elena Likhovtseva	RUS	Vera Zvonareva	10	13	3
SVK	Daniela Hantuchová	JPN	Ai Sugiyama	17	19	4

Rankings are as of 17 October 2005

=== Other entrants ===
The following pair received wildcards into the doubles main draw:

- (Austria) Yvonne Meusburger / (Austria) Tamira Paszek

The following pair received entry from the qualifying draw:

- (Ukraine) Yuliana Fedak / (Russia) Elena Vesnina
