= 2008 Generali Ladies Linz – Doubles =

Doubles
- 2008 Generali Ladies Linz

Final
- Champions: (Slovenia) Katarina Srebotnik (Japan) Ai Sugiyama
- Runners-up: (Zimbabwe) Cara Black (United States) Liezel Huber
- Score: 6–4, 7–5

Details
- Draw: 16
- Seeds: 4

Events
| Singles | Doubles |
| ← 2007 · | Linz Open | · 2009 → |

Cara Black and Liezel Huber were the defending champions, but Katarina Srebotnik and Ai Sugiyama defeated them 6–4, 7–5, in the final.

== Seeds ==
1. (Zimbabwe) Cara Black / (United States) Liezel Huber (final)
2. (Slovenia) Katarina Srebotnik / (Japan) Ai Sugiyama (champions)
3. (Czech Republic) Květa Peschke / (Australia) Rennae Stubbs (semifinals)
4. (Ukraine) Alyona Bondarenko / (Ukraine) Kateryna Bondarenko (first round)

== Draw ==
=== Key ===
- Q = Qualifier
- WC = Wild card
- LL = Lucky loser
- Alt = Alternate
- ITF = ITF entry
- PR = Protected ranking
- SR = Special ranking
- SE = Special exempt
- JE = Junior exempt
- JR = Junior Accelerator Programme entrant
- CO = College Accelerator Programme entrant
- NG = Next Gen Accelerator Program entrant
- w/o = Walkover
- r = Retired
- d = Defaulted

=== Draw ===
First round
1 | (Zimbabwe) C Black (United States) L Huber | 6 | 4 | [10]
(Czech Republic) R Voráčová (Czech Republic) B Záhlavová-Strýcová | 1 | 6 | [7]
(Russia) M Kirilenko (Italy) F Pennetta | 6 | 3 | [12]
(Ukraine) O Savchuk (Germany) K Wörle | 1 | 6 | [10]
4 | (Ukraine) A Bondarenko (Ukraine) K Bondarenko | 2 | 4
(United States) J Craybas (Thailand) T Tanasugarn | 6 | 6
(United States) L Raymond (Australia) S Stosur | 6 | 6
(Poland) K Jans (Poland) A Rosolska | 2 | 3
(Russia) E Vesnina (China) J Zheng | 6 | 6
(Russia) N Bratchikova (Germany) J Schruff | 0 | 2
(Czech Republic) E Hrdinová (Czech Republic) V Uhlířová | 3 | 0
3 | (Czech Republic) K Peschke (Australia) R Stubbs | 6 | 6
(Spain) N Llagostera Vives (Spain) MJ Martínez Sánchez | 7 | 6
(Austria) S Klemenschits (Argentina) E Krauth | 6^{3} | 2
(Belarus) E Dzehalevich (Belarus) T Poutchek | 1 | 1
2 | (Slovenia) K Srebotnik (Japan) A Sugiyama | 6 | 6

Quarterfinals
1 | (Zimbabwe) C Black (United States) L Huber | w/o
(Russia) M Kirilenko (Italy) F Pennetta
(United States) J Craybas (Thailand) T Tanasugarn | 7 | 7
(United States) L Raymond (Australia) S Stosur | 5 | 6^{4}
(Russia) E Vesnina (China) J Zheng | 4 | 7 | [5]
3 | (Czech Republic) K Peschke (Australia) R Stubbs | 6 | 6^{5} | [10]
(Spain) N Llagostera Vives (Spain) MJ Martínez Sánchez | 2 | 3
2 | (Slovenia) K Srebotnik (Japan) A Sugiyama | 6 | 6

Semifinals
1 | (Zimbabwe) C Black (United States) L Huber | 7 | 6
(United States) J Craybas (Thailand) T Tanasugarn | 5 | 3
3 | (Czech Republic) K Peschke (Australia) R Stubbs | 3 | 3
2 | (Slovenia) K Srebotnik (Japan) A Sugiyama | 6 | 6

Final
1 | (Zimbabwe) C Black (United States) L Huber | 4 | 5
2 | (Slovenia) K Srebotnik (Japan) A Sugiyama | 6 | 7
