= 2006 Generali Ladies Linz =

- Date: 23–29 October
- Edition: 20th
- Category: Tier II Series
- Draw: 28S / 16D
- Prize money: USD600,000
- Surface: Hard (indoor)
- Location: Linz, Austria
- Venue: TipsArena Linz

Champions

Singles
- (Russia) Maria Sharapova

Doubles
- (United States) Lisa Raymond / (Australia) Samantha Stosur
- Linz Open

The 2006 Generali Ladies Linz is the 2006 Tier II WTA Tour tournament of the annually-held Generali Ladies Linz tennis tournament. It was the 20th edition of the tournament and was held from 23 October until 29 October 2006 at the TipsArena Linz. First-seeded Maria Sharapova won the singles title.

== Finals ==
=== Singles ===
- (Russia) Maria Sharapova defeated (Russia) Nadia Petrova, 7–5, 6–2.

It was the 5th singles title for Sharapova in the season and the 15th title in her career.

=== Doubles ===
- (United States) Lisa Raymond / (Australia) Samantha Stosur defeated (United States) Corina Morariu / (Slovenia) Katarina Srebotnik, 6–3, 6–0

It was the 58th title for Raymond and the 15th title for Stubbs in their respective doubles careers. It was also the 8th for the pair during the season.

== Points and prize money ==
=== Point distribution ===
Event	W	F	SF	QF	Round of 16	Round of 32	Q	Q3	Q2	Q1
Singles	195	137	88	49	25	1	11.75	6.75	4	1
Doubles	195	137	88	49	1	—N/a	11.75	—N/a	—N/a	—N/a

=== Prize money ===
Event	W	F	SF	QF	Round of 16	Round of 32	Q3	Q2	Q1
Singles	$95,500	$51,000	$27,300	$14,600	$7,820	$4,175	$2,230	$1,195	$640
Doubles *	$30,000	$16,120	$8,620	$4,610	$2,465	—N/a	—N/a	—N/a	—N/a

_{* per team}

== Singles main draw entrants ==
=== Seeds ===
Country	Player	Rank	Seed
RUS	Maria Sharapova	3	1
RUS	Nadia Petrova	5	2
SUI	Patty Schnyder	8	3
CZE	Nicole Vaidišová	11	4
SRB	Ana Ivanovic	13	5
SRB	Jelena Janković	14	6
RUS	Anna Chakvetadze	16	7
ITA	Francesca Schiavone	17	8

Rankings are as of 16 October 2006

=== Other entrants ===
The following players received wildcards into the singles main draw:

- (France) Nathalie Dechy
- (Austria) Tamira Paszek

The following players received entry from the qualifying draw:

- (Ukraine) Alona Bondarenko
- (Greece) Eleni Daniilidou
- (Poland) Agnieszka Radwańska
- (Russia) Elena Vesnina

=== Withdrawals ===
- (France) Tatiana Golovin → replaced by (Netherlands) Michaëlla Krajicek
- (Italy) Flavia Pennetta → replaced by (Italy) Mara Santangelo
- (Russia) Dinara Safina → replaced by (Australia) Samantha Stosur

=== Retirements ===
- (Russia) Maria Kirilenko (right hip strain)
- (Slovakia) Daniela Hantuchová (right rib injury)
- (France) Mary Pierce (left knee injury)

== Doubles main draw entrants ==
=== Seeds ===
Country	Player	Country	Player	Rank	Seed
USA	Lisa Raymond	AUS	Samantha Stosur	2	1
CZE	Květa Peschke	ITA	Francesca Schiavone	19	2
SVK	Daniela Hantuchová	JPN	Ai Sugiyama	23	3
FRA	Nathalie Dechy	RUS	Vera Zvonareva	34	4

Rankings are as of 16 October 2006

=== Other entrants ===
The following pairs received wildcards into the doubles main draw:

- (Austria) Sybille Bammer / (Austria) Melanie Klaffner
- (Serbia) Jelena Janković / (Slovenia) Tina Križan

The following pair received entry from the qualifying draw:

- (Slovakia) Jarmila Gajdošová / (Australia) Bryanne Stewart

The following pair received entry as lucky losers:

- (Germany) Martina Müller / (Germany) Julia Schruff

=== Withdrawals ===
Before the tournament

- (Russia) Maria Kirilenko (right hip strain) → replaced by Müller / Schruff

During the tournament

- (France) Nathalie Dechy (left knee pain due to a tendonitis)
- (Slovakia) Daniela Hantuchová (right rib injury)
- (Italy) Francesca Schiavone (right knee injury)
- (Russia) Elena Vesnina (low back injury)
