= 2010 Generali Ladies Linz – Doubles =

Doubles
- 2010 Generali Ladies Linz

Final
- Champions: (Czech Republic) Renata Voráčová (Czech Republic) Barbora Záhlavová-Strýcová
- Runners-up: (Czech Republic) Květa Peschke (Slovenia) Katarina Srebotnik
- Score: 7–5, 7–6^{(8–6)}

Details
- Draw: 16
- Seeds: 4

Events
Singles	Doubles
← 2009 ·	Linz Open	· 2011 →

Anna-Lena Grönefeld and Katarina Srebotnik were the defending champions, but Grönefeld didn't participate that year.
Srebotnik chose to partner with Květa Peschke. They reached the final, where they lost to Renata Voráčová and Barbora Záhlavová-Strýcová 5–7, 6–7(6).

== Seeds ==
1. (Czech Republic) Květa Peschke / (Slovenia) Katarina Srebotnik (final)
2. (Czech Republic) Renata Voráčová / (Czech Republic) Barbora Záhlavová-Strýcová (champions)
3. (Italy) Sara Errani / (Italy) Roberta Vinci (semifinals)
4. (Poland) Klaudia Jans / (Poland) Alicja Rosolska (semifinals)

== Draw ==
=== Key ===
- Q = Qualifier
- WC = Wild card
- LL = Lucky loser
- Alt = Alternate
- ITF = ITF entry
- PR = Protected ranking
- SR = Special ranking
- SE = Special exempt
- JE = Junior exempt
- JR = Junior Accelerator Programme entrant
- CO = College Accelerator Programme entrant
- NG = Next Gen Accelerator Program entrant
- w/o = Walkover
- r = Retired
- d = Defaulted

=== Draw ===
First round
1	(Czech Republic) K Peschke (Slovenia) K Srebotnik	4	6	[10]
(Germany) J Görges (Slovenia) P Hercog	6	3	[8]
(Spain) A Parra Santonja (Turkey) İ Şenoğlu	1	1
(Russia) A Chakvetadze (Switzerland) P Schnyder	6	6
3	(Italy) S Errani (Italy) R Vinci	6	6
(Ukraine) A Bondarenko (Ukraine) K Bondarenko	3	1
(Romania) S Cîrstea (Slovenia) A Klepač	6^{3}	6	[12]
(France) S Lefèvre (Czech Republic) K Zakopalová	7	4	[10]
(United Kingdom) A Keothavong (Belarus) T Poutchek	2	6^{3}
WC	(Georgia (country)) M Chakhnashvili (Austria) M Klaffner	6	7
(Russia) M Kondratieva (Czech Republic) V Uhlířová	3	1
4	(Poland) K Jans (Poland) A Rosolska	6	6
WC	(Sweden) S Arvidsson (Austria) S Klemenschits	6	2	[6]
(Greece) E Daniilidou (Germany) J Wöhr	2	6	[10]
(United Kingdom) S Borwell (United States) R Kops-Jones	2	6^{2}
2	(Czech Republic) R Voráčová (Czech Republic) B Záhlavová-Strýcová	6	7

Quarterfinals
1	(Czech Republic) K Peschke (Slovenia) K Srebotnik	6	6
(Russia) A Chakvetadze (Switzerland) P Schnyder	2	3
3	(Italy) S Errani (Italy) R Vinci	6	6
(Romania) S Cîrstea (Slovenia) A Klepač	1	1
WC	(Georgia (country)) M Chakhnashvili (Austria) M Klaffner	0	4
4	(Poland) K Jans (Poland) A Rosolska	6	6
(Greece) E Daniilidou (Germany) J Wöhr	5	0
2	(Czech Republic) R Voráčová (Czech Republic) B Záhlavová-Strýcová	7	6

Semifinals
1	(Czech Republic) K Peschke (Slovenia) K Srebotnik	6	6
3	(Italy) S Errani (Italy) R Vinci	2	2
4	(Poland) K Jans (Poland) A Rosolska	1	7	[2]
2	(Czech Republic) R Voráčová (Czech Republic) B Záhlavová-Strýcová	6	6^{4}	[10]

Finals
1	(Czech Republic) K Peschke (Slovenia) K Srebotnik	5	6^{6}
2	(Czech Republic) R Voráčová (Czech Republic) B Záhlavová-Strýcová	7	7
