= 2005 Generali Ladies Linz – Singles =

Singles
- 2005 Generali Ladies Linz

Final
- Champion: (Russia) Nadia Petrova
- Runner-up: (Switzerland) Patty Schnyder
- Score: 4–6, 6–3, 6–1

Details
- Draw: 28
- Seeds: 8

Events
Singles	Doubles
← 2004 ·	Linz Open	· 2006 →

Amélie Mauresmo was the defending champion, but withdrew from the tournament due to injury.

Nadia Petrova won her maiden WTA tour title, defeating Patty Schnyder in the final 4–6, 6–3, 6–1.

This was the final tournament in which Grand Slam champion and former world No. 2 Conchita Martínez participated in singles, before her retirement in 2006. She retired in the second round against Daniela Hantuchová.

== Seeds ==
The top three seeds who played, and the ninth seed, received a bye into the second round.

1. (France) Amélie Mauresmo (withdrew)
2. (Russia) Elena Dementieva (second round)
3. (Russia) Nadia Petrova (champion)
4. (Switzerland) Patty Schnyder (final)
5. (Russia) Elena Likhovtseva (first round)
6. (Slovakia) Daniela Hantuchová (quarterfinals)
7. (Serbia and Montenegro) Jelena Janković (first round)
8. (Serbia and Montenegro) Ana Ivanovic (semifinals)
9. (France) Tatiana Golovin (quarterfinals) (Note: Tatiana Golovin was initially unseeded, and was scheduled to face Sesil Karatantcheva in the first round. However, following Amélie Mauresmo's withdrawal, Golovin was promoted to ninth seed, necessitating a draw reshuffle. Golovin occupied Mauresmo's original position in the draw, receiving a first-round bye, and Yvonne Meusburger received entry into the main draw as a lucky loser, and was positioned in Golovin's original position.)

== Draw ==
=== Key ===
- Q = Qualifier
- WC = Wild card
- LL = Lucky loser
- Alt = Alternate
- SE = Special exempt
- PR = Protected ranking
- ITF = ITF entry
- JE = Junior exempt
- w/o = Walkover
- r = Retired
- d = Defaulted
- SR = Special ranking

=== Finals ===
Semifinals
8	(Serbia and Montenegro) Ana Ivanovic	5	2
4	(Switzerland) Patty Schnyder	7	6
3	(Russia) Nadia Petrova	6	6
(Czech Republic) Květa Peschke	3	4

Final
4	(Switzerland) Patty Schnyder	6	3	1
3	(Russia) Nadia Petrova	4	6	6

=== Top half ===
First round
LL	(Austria) Y Meusburger	6^{3}	3
(Bulgaria) S Karatantcheva	7^{7}	6
(Austria) T Paszek	7^{8}	1	7
Q	(Russia) E Vesnina	6^{6}	6	5
(Japan) S Asagoe	6^{4}	2
8	(Serbia and Montenegro) A Ivanovic	7^{7}	6
Q	(Poland) M Domachowska	3	3
(Czech Republic) I Benešová	6	6
(Spain) C Martínez	6	6
(France) M Bartoli	1	1
(Czech Republic) K Koukalová	4	7^{7}	6^{9}
6	(Slovakia) D Hantuchová	6	6^{4}	7^{11}

Second round
9	(France) T Golovin	6	7^{7}
(Bulgaria) S Karatantcheva	4	6^{2}
(Austria) T Paszek	5	1
8	(Serbia and Montenegro) A Ivanovic	7	6
4	(Switzerland) P Schnyder	6	6
(Czech Republic) I Benešová	2	2
(Spain) C Martínez	6	0	1^{r}
6	(Slovakia) D Hantuchová	2	6	3

Quarterfinals
9	(France) T Golovin	7	6
8	(Serbia and Montenegro) A Ivanovic	5	3
4	(Switzerland) P Schnyder	6	6
6	(Slovakia) D Hantuchová	2	1

Semifinals
8	(Serbia and Montenegro) A Ivanovic	5	2
4	(Switzerland) P Schnyder	7	6

=== Bottom half ===
First round
(Russia) V Dushevina	7^{8}	3	6
7	(Serbia and Montenegro) J Janković	6^{6}	6	0
(France) V Razzano	7^{7}	6
WC	(Austria) S Bammer	6^{3}	3
Q	(Sweden) S Arvidsson	6	6
Q	(Czech Republic) B Strýcová	1	2
(Japan) A Sugiyama	6	4	7
5	(Russia) E Likhovtseva	1	6	5
WC	(United States) L Raymond	7^{7}	6^{6}	2
(Argentina) G Dulko	6^{2}	7^{8}	6
(Czech Republic) K Peschke	7	7
(Russia) V Zvonareva	5	5

Second round
(Russia) V Dushevina	5	4
WC	(Austria) S Bammer	7	6
Q	(Sweden) S Arvidsson	3	3
3	(Russia) N Petrova	6	6
(Japan) A Sugiyama	6	3	6
(Argentina) G Dulko	4	6	2
(Czech Republic) K Peschke	6	7
2	(Russia) E Dementieva	3	5

Quarterfinals
WC	(Austria) S Bammer	2	6	3
3	(Russia) N Petrova	6	3	6
(Japan) A Sugiyama	6	5	4
(Czech Republic) K Peschke	4	7	6

Semifinals
3	(Russia) N Petrova	6	6
(Czech Republic) K Peschke	3	4

== Qualifying ==
=== Seeds ===
1. (Czech Republic) Iveta Benešová (Promoted to main draw)
2. (Poland) Marta Domachowska (qualified)
3. (Ukraine) Alona Bondarenko (second round)
4. (Spain) Laura Pous Tió (first round)
5. (Czech Republic) Zuzana Ondrášková (second round)
6. (Sweden) Sofia Arvidsson (qualified)
7. (Finland) Emma Laine (first round)
8. (Bulgaria) Tsvetana Pironkova (second round)
9. (Switzerland) Emmanuelle Gagliardi (second round)

=== Qualifiers ===
1. (Russia) Elena Vesnina
2. (Poland) Marta Domachowska
3. (Sweden) Sofia Arvidsson
4. (Czech Republic) Barbora Strýcová

=== Lucky losers ===
1. (Austria) Yvonne Meusburger

=== Draw ===
==== First qualifier ====
First round
9	(Switzerland) Emmanuelle Gagliardi	6	6
WC	(Austria) Tina Schiechtl	4	1
(Russia) Elena Vesnina	6	6
(Germany) Kathrin Wörle	2	4
Alt	(Czech Republic) Libuše Průšová	4	2
(Ukraine) Kateryna Bondarenko	6	6
(Uzbekistan) Varvara Lepchenko	1	0^{r}
8	(Bulgaria) Tsvetana Pironkova	6	5

Second round
9	(Switzerland) Emmanuelle Gagliardi	6	0	4
(Russia) Elena Vesnina	3	6	6
(Ukraine) Kateryna Bondarenko	6	7
8	(Bulgaria) Tsvetana Pironkova	4	5

Qualifying competition
(Russia) Elena Vesnina	6	6
(Ukraine) Kateryna Bondarenko	1	1

==== Second qualifier ====
First round
2	(Poland) Marta Domachowska	6	6
(Canada) Marie-Ève Pelletier	4	2
(Ukraine) Viktoriya Kutuzova	6	6
(Czech Republic) Kateřina Böhmová	4	0
(Ukraine) Yuliana Fedak	6	2	6
(Tunisia) Selima Sfar	3	6	3
WC	(Germany) Gréta Arn	0	1
5	(Czech Republic) Zuzana Ondrášková	6	6

Second round
2	(Poland) Marta Domachowska	6	6
(Ukraine) Viktoriya Kutuzova	0	4
(Ukraine) Yuliana Fedak	6	6
5	(Czech Republic) Zuzana Ondrášková	2	4

Qualifying competition
2	(Poland) Marta Domachowska	5	6	7^{9}
(Ukraine) Yuliana Fedak	7	3	6^{7}

==== Third qualifier ====
First round
3	(Ukraine) Alona Bondarenko	2	6	6
(Russia) Tatiana Panova	6	4	2
(Austria) Yvonne Meusburger	6	6
Alt	(Bosnia and Herzegovina) Mervana Jugić-Salkić	0	4
(Germany) Sabine Klaschka	6	6
(United Kingdom) Elena Baltacha	1	2
(Czech Republic) Eva Birnerová	7^{10}	4	0
6	(Sweden) Sofia Arvidsson	6^{8}	6	6

Second round
3	(Ukraine) Alona Bondarenko	4	6	3
(Austria) Yvonne Meusburger	6	3	6
(Germany) Sabine Klaschka	5	0
6	(Sweden) Sofia Arvidsson	7	6

Qualifying competition
(Austria) Yvonne Meusburger	4	4
6	(Sweden) Sofia Arvidsson	6	6

==== Fourth qualifier ====
First round
4	(Spain) Laura Pous Tió	2	6^{6}
WC	(Austria) Barbara Schwartz	6	7^{8}
(Czech Republic) Michaela Paštiková	6^{3}	3
WC	(Austria) Nicole Remis	7^{7}	6
(Croatia) Silvija Talaja	6	3	3
(Slovakia) Ľudmila Cervanová	2	6	6
(Czech Republic) Barbora Strýcová	6	3	6
7	(Finland) Emma Laine	3	6	3

Second round
WC	(Austria) Barbara Schwartz	0	0^{r}
WC	(Austria) Nicole Remis	6	1
(Slovakia) Ľudmila Cervanová	3	2
(Czech Republic) Barbora Strýcová	6	6

Qualifying competition
WC	(Austria) Nicole Remis	3	3
(Czech Republic) Barbora Strýcová	6	6
