= 2005 Generali Ladies Linz – Doubles =

Doubles
- 2005 Generali Ladies Linz

Final
- Champions: (Argentina) Gisela Dulko (Czech Republic) Květa Peschke
- Runners-up: (Spain) Conchita Martínez (Spain) Virginia Ruano Pascual
- Score: 6–2, 6–3

Events
Singles	Doubles
← 2004 ·	Linz Open	· 2006 →

Janette Husárová and Elena Likhovtseva were the defending champions, but Husárová did not participate. Likhovtseva participated with Vera Zvonareva, but the pair lost in the semifinals to Conchita Martínez and Virginia Ruano Pascual.

Gisela Dulko and Květa Peschke won the title, defeating Martínez and Ruano Pascual in the final 6–2, 6–3.

== Seeds ==
1. (Zimbabwe) Cara Black / (Australia) Rennae Stubbs (quarterfinals)
2. (Spain) Conchita Martínez / (Spain) Virginia Ruano Pascual (final)
3. (Russia) Elena Likhovtseva / (Russia) Vera Zvonareva (semifinals)
4. (Slovakia) Daniela Hantuchová / (Japan) Ai Sugiyama (semifinals)

== Draw ==
=== Key ===
- Q = Qualifier
- WC = Wild card
- LL = Lucky loser
- Alt = Alternate
- SE = Special exempt
- PR = Protected ranking
- ITF = ITF entry
- JE = Junior exempt
- w/o = Walkover
- r = Retired
- d = Defaulted
- SR = Special ranking

=== Draw ===
First round
1	(Zimbabwe) C Black (Australia) R Stubbs	6	6
WC	(Austria) Y Meusburger (Austria) T Paszek	3	4
(Argentina) G Dulko (Czech Republic) K Peschke	7^{9}	6
Q	(Ukraine) Y Fedak (Russia) E Vesnina	6^{7}	2
4	(Slovakia) D Hantuchová (Japan) A Sugiyama	6	6
(Austria) D Klemenschits (Austria) S Klemenschits	0	3
(Czech Republic) E Birnerová (Romania) A Ehritt-Vanc	6	6
(Czech Republic) L Hradecká (Czech Republic) V Uhlířová	2	4
(Czech Republic) I Benešová (Czech Republic) B Strýcová	7^{7}	2	4
(Slovenia) T Križan (Tunisia) S Sfar	6^{2}	6	6
(Ukraine) Y Beygelzimer (Bosnia and Herzegovina) M Jugić-Salkić	5	3
3	(Russia) E Likhovtseva (Russia) V Zvonareva	7	6
(Ukraine) A Bondarenko (Ukraine) K Bondarenko	6	5	5
(Russia) V Dushevina (Croatia) S Talaja	4	7	7
(Serbia and Montenegro) J Janković (Switzerland) E Gagliardi	4	6^{3}
2	(Spain) C Martínez (Spain) V Ruano Pascual	6	7^{7}

Quarterfinals
1	(Zimbabwe) C Black (Australia) R Stubbs	6^{2}	4
(Argentina) G Dulko (Czech Republic) K Peschke	7^{7}	6
4	(Slovakia) D Hantuchová (Japan) A Sugiyama	6	6
(Czech Republic) E Birnerová (Romania) A Ehritt-Vanc	0	2
(Slovenia) T Križan (Tunisia) S Sfar	3	2
3	(Russia) E Likhovtseva (Russia) V Zvonreva	6	6
(Russia) V Dushevina (Croatia) S Talaja	6	1	2
2	(Spain) C Martínez (Spain) V Ruano Pascual	4	6	6

Semifinals
(Argentina) G Dulko (Czech Republic) K Peschke	4	6	6
4	(Slovakia) D Hantuchová (Japan) A Sugiyama	6	3	3
3	(Russia) E Likhovtseva (Russia) V Zvonareva	6^{4}	1
2	(Spain) C Martínez (Spain) V Ruano Pascual	7^{7}	6

Final
(Argentina) G Dulko (Czech Republic) K Peschke	6	6
2	(Spain) C Martínez (Spain) V Ruano Pascual	2	3

== Qualifying ==
=== Seeds ===
1. (Ukraine) Yuliana Fedak / (Russia) Elena Vesnina (qualified)
2. (Croatia) Darija Jurak / (Finland) Emma Laine (qualifying competition)

=== Qualifiers ===
1. (Ukraine) Yuliana Fedak / (Russia) Elena Vesnina

=== Draw ===
First round
1	(Ukraine) Yuliana Fedak (Russia) Elena Vesnina	8
(Austria) Stefanie Haidner (Austria) Daniela Kix	6
(Poland) Karolina Kosińska (Germany) Caroline Schneider	8^{6}
2	(Croatia) Darija Jurak (Finland) Emma Laine	9^{8}

Qualifying competition
1	(Ukraine) Yuliana Fedak (Russia) Elena Vesnina	6	6
2	(Croatia) Darija Jurak (Finland) Emma Laine	3	1
