= 2008 Generali Ladies Linz – Singles =

Tennis tournament

Singles
- 2008 Generali Ladies Linz

Final
- Champion: (Serbia) Ana Ivanovic
- Runner-up: (Russia) Vera Zvonareva
- Score: 6–2, 6–1

Details
- Draw: 28
- Seeds: 8

Events
Singles	Doubles
← 2007 ·	Linz Open	· 2009 →

Daniela Hantuchová was the defending champion, but chose not to participate that year.

Ana Ivanovic won the title, defeating Vera Zvonareva in the final 6–2, 6–1.

== Seeds ==
The top four seeds receive a bye into the second round.

1. (Serbia) Ana Ivanovic (champion)
2. (Russia) Vera Zvonareva (final)
3. (Poland) Agnieszka Radwańska (semifinals)
4. (Switzerland) Patty Schnyder (second round)
5. (Russia) Nadia Petrova (quarterfinals)
6. (France) Marion Bartoli (semifinals)
7. (Italy) Flavia Pennetta (quarterfinals)
8. (France) Alizé Cornet (quarterfinals)

== Draw ==
=== Key ===
- Q = Qualifier
- WC = Wild card
- LL = Lucky loser
- Alt = Alternate
- ITF = ITF entry
- PR = Protected ranking
- SR = Special ranking
- SE = Special exempt
- JE = Junior exempt
- JR = Junior Accelerator Programme entrant
- CO = College Accelerator Programme entrant
- NG = Next Gen Accelerator Program entrant
- w/o = Walkover
- r = Retired
- d = Defaulted

=== Finals ===
Semifinals
1	(Serbia) Ana Ivanovic	6	3	7
3	(Poland) Agnieszka Radwańska	2	6	5
6	(France) Marion Bartoli	0	1
2	(Russia) Vera Zvonareva	6	6

Final
1	(Serbia) Ana Ivanovic	6	6
2	(Russia) Vera Zvonareva	2	1

=== Top half ===
First round
(Austria) S Bammer	7	6
(Italy) F Schiavone	5	3
WC	(Austria) Y Meusburger	4	2
(Slovakia) D Cibulková	6	6
(Hungary) Á Szávay	1	2
7	(Italy) F Pennetta	6	6
WC	(Austria) M Klaffner	4	0
(Estonia) K Kanepi	6	6
(Thailand) T Tanasugarn	1	5
(Slovenia) K Srebotnik	6	7
(Ukraine) K Bondarenko	6	3	1
5	(Russia) N Petrova	3	6	6

Second round
1	(Serbia) A Ivanovic	6	6
(Austria) S Bammer	4	2
(Slovakia) D Cibulková	3	1
7	(Italy) F Pennetta	6	6
3	(Poland) A Radwańska	6	6
(Estonia) K Kanepi	2	4
(Slovenia) K Srebotnik	4	6^{7}
5	(Russia) N Petrova	6	7

Quarterfinals
1	(Serbia) A Ivanovic	6	6
7	(Italy) F Pennetta	4	4
3	(Poland) A Radwańska	6	6
5	(Russia) N Petrova	3	2

Semifinals
1	(Serbia) A Ivanovic	6	3	7
3	(Poland) A Radwańska	2	6	5

=== Bottom half ===
First round
6	(France) M Bartoli	6	2	7
(Japan) A Sugiyama	4	6	6^{8}
WC	(Austria) T Paszek	3	3
Q	(Czech Republic) P Kvitová	6	6
(Ukraine) A Bondarenko	6	6
Q	(Russia) E Makarova	3	3
8	(France) A Cornet	6	6
(China) J Zheng	3	2
Q	(Ukraine) O Savchuk	2	5
(Russia) M Kirilenko	6	7
Q	(Spain) N Llagostera Vives	2	6	6
(Australia) S Stosur	6	4	2

Second round
6	(France) M Bartoli	7	1	6
Q	(Czech Republic) P Kvitová	6^{4}	6	3
(Ukraine) A Bondarenko	6	2	6
4	(Switzerland) P Schnyder	2	6	1
8	(France) A Cornet	1	6	6
(Russia) M Kirilenko	6	2	1
Q	(Spain) N Llagostera Vives	2	0
2	(Russia) V Zvonareva	6	6

Quarterfinals
6	(France) M Bartoli	6	5	6
(Ukraine) A Bondarenko	3	7	1
8	(France) A Cornet	5	1
2	(Russia) V Zvonareva	7	6

Semifinals
6	(France) M Bartoli	0	1
2	(Russia) V Zvonareva	6	6
