= 2006 Generali Ladies Linz – Singles =

Singles
- 2006 Generali Ladies Linz

Final
- Champion: (Russia) Maria Sharapova
- Runner-up: (Russia) Nadia Petrova
- Score: 7–5, 6–2

Details
- Draw: 28
- Seeds: 8

Events
Singles	Doubles
← 2005 ·	Linz Open	· 2007 →

Nadia Petrova was the defending champion, but lost in the final to Maria Sharapova 5–7, 2–6.

== Seeds ==
The top four seeds received a bye into the second round.

1. (Russia) Maria Sharapova (champion)
2. (Russia) Nadia Petrova (final)
3. (Switzerland) Patty Schnyder (semifinals)
4. (Czech Republic) Nicole Vaidišová (semifinals)
5. (Serbia) Ana Ivanovic (quarterfinals)
6. (Serbia) Jelena Janković (quarterfinals)
7. (Russia) Anna Chakvetadze (second round)
8. (Italy) Francesca Schiavone (first round)

== Draw ==
=== Key ===
- Q = Qualifier
- WC = Wild card
- LL = Lucky loser
- Alt = Alternate
- ITF = ITF entry
- PR = Protected ranking
- SR = Special ranking
- SE = Special exempt
- JE = Junior exempt
- JR = Junior Accelerator Programme entrant
- CO = College Accelerator Programme entrant
- NG = Next Gen Accelerator Program entrant
- w/o = Walkover
- r = Retired
- d = Defaulted

=== Finals ===
Semifinals
1	(Russia) Maria Sharapova	7	7
3	(Switzerland) Patty Schnyder	5	5
4	(Czech Republic) Nicole Vaidišová	1	2
2	(Russia) Nadia Petrova	6	6

Final
1	(Russia) Maria Sharapova	7	6
2	(Russia) Nadia Petrova	5	2

=== Top half ===
First round
(United States) C Rubin	1	2
Q	(Greece) E Daniilidou	6	6
(Germany) A-L Grönefeld	4	5
Q	(Poland) A Radwańska	6	7
(Netherlands) M Krajicek	1	6^{2}
5	(Serbia) A Ivanovic	6	7^{7}
WC	(France) N Dechy	2	6	6
WC	(Austria) T Paszek	6	3	1
(France) M Pierce	7^{7}	7^{7}
(Japan) A Sugiyama	6^{3}	6^{5}
(Russia) V Zvonareva	5	6	6
8	(Italy) F Schiavone	7	1	3

Second round
1	(Russia) M Sharapova	7	6
Q	(Greece) E Daniilidou	5	1
Q	(Poland) A Radwańska	2	2
5	(Serbia) A Ivanovic	6	6
3	(Switzerland) P Schnyder	6^{1}	6	6
WC	(France) N Dechy	7^{7}	4	3
(France) M Pierce	6	6^{r}
(Russia) V Zvonareva	4	5

Quarterfinals
1	(Russia) M Sharapova	7^{7}	7
5	(Serbia) A Ivanovic	6^{3}	5
3	(Switzerland) P Schnyder	7^{7}	6
(Russia) V Zvonareva	6^{2}	4

Semifinals
1	(Russia) M Sharapova	7	7
3	(Switzerland) P Schnyder	5	5

=== Bottom half ===
First round
6	(Serbia) J Janković	6	6^{3}	6
(Austria) S Bammer	1	7^{7}	3
(Slovakia) D Hantuchová	3^{r}
Q	(Russia) E Vesnina	4
Q	(Ukraine) A Bondarenko	4	6	3
(Italy) M Santangelo	6	1	6
7	(Russia) A Chakvetadze	7	6
(Slovenia) K Srebotnik	5	2
(Australia) S Stosur	6	3
(Russia) M Kirilenko	4	2^{r}
(Israel) S Pe'er	6	7^{7}
(France) M Bartoli	3	6^{4}

Second round
6	(Serbia) J Janković	6^{4}	6	6
Q	(Russia) E Vesnina	7^{7}	4	2
(Italy) M Santangelo	6^{4}	0
4	(Czech Republic) N Vaidišová	7^{7}	6
7	(Russia) A Chakvetadze	4	4
(Australia) S Stosur	6	6
(Israel) S Pe'er	1	1
2	(Russia) N Petrova	6	6

Quarterfinals
6	(Serbia) J Janković	7	6^{5}	4
4	(Czech Republic) N Vaidišová	5	7^{7}	6
(Australia) S Stosur	1	3
2	(Russia) N Petrova	6	6

Semifinals
4	(Czech Republic) N Vaidišová	1	2
2	(Russia) N Petrova	6	6
