= 2010 Generali Ladies Linz – Singles =

Singles
- 2010 Generali Ladies Linz

Final
- Champions: (Serbia) Ana Ivanovic
- Runners-up: (Switzerland) Patty Schnyder
- Score: 6–1, 6–2

Details
- Draw: 32
- Seeds: 8

Events
Singles	Doubles
← 2009 ·	Linz Open	· 2011 →

Yanina Wickmayer was the defending champion, but chose to participate in the 100,000+H ITF event in Torhout, Belgium.

Ana Ivanovic won the title, defeating Patty Schnyder in the final 6–1, 6–2, in 45 minutes. This was her second title in Linz, and was her first career title since winning this tournament in 2008.

== Seeds ==
1. (United States) Serena Williams (withdrew due to a right foot injury)
2. (Slovakia) Daniela Hantuchová (quarterfinals)
3. (Ukraine) Alona Bondarenko (first round)
4. (Slovakia) Dominika Cibulková (first round)
5. (Czech Republic) Petra Kvitová (second round)
6. (Germany) Andrea Petkovic (semifinals)
7. (Serbia) Ana Ivanovic (champion)
8. (Czech Republic) Klára Zakopalová (second round)
9. (Italy) Sara Errani (quarterfinals)

== Draw ==
=== Key ===
- Q = Qualifier
- WC = Wild card
- LL = Lucky loser
- Alt = Alternate
- ITF = ITF entry
- PR = Protected ranking
- SR = Special ranking
- SE = Special exempt
- JE = Junior exempt
- JR = Junior Accelerator Programme entrant
- CO = College Accelerator Programme entrant
- NG = Next Gen Accelerator Program entrant
- w/o = Walkover
- r = Retired
- d = Defaulted

=== Finals ===
Semifinals
(Italy) Roberta Vinci	3	5
7/WC	(Serbia) Ana Ivanovic	6	7
6	(Germany) Andrea Petkovic	2	6	5
(Switzerland) Patty Schnyder	6	4	7

Final
7/WC	(Serbia) Ana Ivanovic	6	6
(Switzerland) Patty Schnyder	1	2

=== Top half ===
First round
3	(Ukraine) A Bondarenko	2	2
(Italy) R Vinci	6	6
WC	(Austria) Y Meusburger	7	3	3
(Sweden) S Arvidsson	5	6	6
(France) A Cornet	1	3
Q	(Czech Republic) R Voráčová	6	6
Q	(Kazakhstan) S Karatantcheva	2	2
9	(Italy) S Errani	6	6
5	(Czech Republic) P Kvitová	6	1
(Australia) A Rodionova	2	0	r
Q	(Slovenia) P Hercog	4	6	4
(Germany) J Görges	6	4	6
(Czech Republic) B Záhlavová-Strýcová	6^{5}	6	6
(Latvia) A Sevastova	7	1	4
LL	(Romania) S Cîrstea	2	0
7/WC	(Serbia) A Ivanovic	6	6

Second round
(Italy) R Vinci	6	6
(Sweden) S Arvidsson	4	2
Q	(Czech Republic) R Voráčová	2	2
9	(Italy) S Errani	6	6
5	(Czech Republic) P Kvitová	2	1
(Germany) J Görges	6	6
(Czech Republic) B Záhlavová-Strýcová	3	2
7/WC	(Serbia) A Ivanovic	6↑	6

Quarterfinals
(Italy) R Vinci	5	6	6
9	(Italy) S Errani	7	3	4
(Germany) J Görges	6^{6}	2
7/WC	(Serbia) A Ivanovic	7	6

Semifinals
(Italy) R Vinci	3	5
7/WC	(Serbia) A Ivanovic	6	7

↑Ana Ivanovic was docked one game in the first set for taking too long during a bathroom break.

=== Bottom half ===
First round
6	(Germany) A Petkovic	6	6
(Germany) A Kerber	3	4
(United Kingdom) A Keothavong	4	6	7
(Australia) J Groth	6	1	6^{4}
WC	(Austria) S Bammer	7	6
(Russia) A Chakvetadze	5	0
Q	(Greece) E Daniilidou	6	6
4	(Slovakia) D Cibulková	2	4
8	(Czech Republic) K Zakopalová	7	7
(Russia) E Vesnina	5	5
(Argentina) G Dulko	2	3
(Switzerland) P Schnyder	6	6
(Spain) A Parra Santonja	3	3
(Spain) C Suárez Navarro	6	6
(Ukraine) K Bondarenko	1	2
2	(Slovakia) D Hantuchová	6	6

Second round
6	(Germany) A Petkovic	6	6
(United Kingdom) A Keothavong	0	3
WC	(Austria) S Bammer	1	6^{2}
Q	(Greece) E Daniilidou	6	7
8	(Czech Republic) K Zakopalová	2	0
(Switzerland) P Schnyder	6	6
(Spain) C Suárez Navarro	4	3
2	(Slovakia) D Hantuchová	6	6

Quarterfinals
6	(Germany) A Petkovic	6	6
Q	(Greece) E Daniilidou	3	2
(Switzerland) P Schnyder	6	6
2	(Slovakia) D Hantuchová	4	4

Semifinals
6	(Germany) A Petkovic	2	6	5
(Switzerland) P Schnyder	6	4	7
