= 2009 Generali Ladies Linz – Doubles =

Doubles
- 2009 Generali Ladies Linz

Final
- Champions: (Germany) Anna-Lena Grönefeld (Slovenia) Katarina Srebotnik
- Runners-up: (Poland) Klaudia Jans (Poland) Alicja Rosolska
- Score: 6–1, 6–4

Details
- Draw: 16
- Seeds: 4

Events
Singles	Doubles
← 2008 ·	Linz Open	· 2010 →

Katarina Srebotnik and Ai Sugiyama were the defending champions, but Sugiyama retired from the sport on October 2, 2009, and only Srebotnik competed that year.
Srebotnik partnered with Anna-Lena Grönefeld, and they won in the final 6–1, 6–4 against Klaudia Jans and Alicja Rosolska.

== Seeds ==
1. (Germany) Anna-Lena Grönefeld / (Slovenia) Katarina Srebotnik (champions)
2. (Poland) Klaudia Jans / (Poland) Alicja Rosolska (final)
3. (Czech Republic) Andrea Hlaváčková / (Czech Republic) Lucie Hradecká (semifinals)
4. (United Kingdom) Sarah Borwell / (United States) Raquel Kops-Jones (quarterfinals)

== Draw ==
=== Key ===
- Q = Qualifier
- WC = Wild card
- LL = Lucky loser
- Alt = Alternate
- ITF = ITF entry
- PR = Protected ranking
- SR = Special ranking
- SE = Special exempt
- JE = Junior exempt
- JR = Junior Accelerator Programme entrant
- CO = College Accelerator Programme entrant
- NG = Next Gen Accelerator Program entrant
- w/o = Walkover
- r = Retired
- d = Defaulted

=== Finals ===
First round
1	(Germany) A-L Grönefeld (Slovenia) K Srebotnik	6	7
(Belarus) O Govortsova (Belarus) T Poutchek	3	6^{7}
(Germany) K Barrois (Germany) J Wöhr	7	7
(Ukraine) Y Beygelzimer (Slovenia) A Klepač	5	6^{4}
4	(United Kingdom) S Borwell (United States) R Kops-Jones	3	6	[10]
(Germany) T Malek (Germany) A Petkovic	6	4	[1]
(Germany) J Görges (Austria) S Klemenschits	4	4
(United States) M Shaughnessy (Italy) R Vinci	6	6
(Latvia) L Dekmeijere (Canada) M-È Pelletier	7	4	[10]
(Spain) A Parra Santonja (Czech Republic) V Uhlířová	5	6	[7]
(Russia) V Manasieva (Romania) M Niculescu	3	5
3	(Czech Republic) A Hlaváčková (Czech Republic) L Hradecká	6	7
(Italy) S Errani (Romania) IR Olaru	6	6
WC	(Austria) M Klaffner (Germany) C Klaschka	1	3
(Russia) M Kondratieva (Poland) U Radwańska	2	1
2	(Poland) K Jans (Poland) A Rosolska	6	6

Quarterfinals
1	(Germany) A-L Grönefeld (Slovenia) K Srebotnik	6	6
(Germany) K Barrois (Germany) J Wöhr	3	2
4	(United Kingdom) S Borwell (United States) R Kops-Jones	3	2
(United States) M Shaughnessy (Italy) R Vinci	6	6
(Latvia) L Dekmeijere (Canada) M-È Pelletier	6	4	[7]
3	(Czech Republic) A Hlaváčková (Czech Republic) L Hradecká	4	6	[10]
(Italy) S Errani (Romania) IR Olaru	3	7	[5]
2	(Poland) K Jans (Poland) A Rosolska	6	6^{1}	[10]

Semifinals
1	(Germany) A-L Grönefeld (Slovenia) K Srebotnik	6	3	[14]
(United States) M Shaughnessy (Italy) R Vinci	1	6	[12]
3	(Czech Republic) A Hlaváčková (Czech Republic) L Hradecká	6^{5}	7	[8]
2	(Poland) K Jans (Poland) A Rosolska	7	5	[10]

Finals
1	(Germany) A-L Grönefeld (Slovenia) K Srebotnik	6	6
2	(Poland) K Jans (Poland) A Rosolska	1	4
