= 2009 Generali Ladies Linz – Singles =

Singles
- 2009 Generali Ladies Linz

Final
- Champion: (Belgium) Yanina Wickmayer
- Runner-up: (Czech Republic) Petra Kvitová
- Score: 6–3, 6–4

Details
- Draw: 32
- Seeds: 8

Events
Singles	Doubles
← 2008 ·	Linz Open	· 2010 →

Ana Ivanovic was the defending champion, but she decided not to compete this year.

Yanina Wickmayer won the title, defeating Petra Kvitová in the final 6–3, 6–4.

== Seeds ==
1. (Italy) Flavia Pennetta (semifinals)
2. (Poland) Agnieszka Radwańska (semifinals)
3. (Belgium) Yanina Wickmayer (champion)
4. (Spain) Carla Suárez Navarro (quarterfinals)
5. (Czech Republic) Iveta Benešová (second round)
6. (Romania) Sorana Cîrstea (first round)
7. (Czech Republic) Lucie Šafářová (quarterfinals)
8. (Italy) Sara Errani (quarterfinals)

== Draw ==
=== Key ===
- Q = Qualifier
- WC = Wild card
- LL = Lucky loser
- Alt = Alternate
- ITF = ITF entry
- PR = Protected ranking
- SR = Special ranking
- SE = Special exempt
- JE = Junior exempt
- JR = Junior Accelerator Programme entrant
- CO = College Accelerator Programme entrant
- NG = Next Gen Accelerator Program entrant
- w/o = Walkover
- r = Retired
- d = Defaulted

=== Finals ===
Semifinals
1	(Italy) Flavia Pennetta	6^{5}	3
3/WC	(Belgium) Yanina Wickmayer	7	6
(Czech Republic) Petra Kvitová	6	6
2	(Poland) Agnieszka Radwańska	3	2

Final
3/WC	(Belgium) Yanina Wickmayer	6	6
(Czech Republic) Petra Kvitová	3	4

=== Top half ===
First round
1	(Italy) F Pennetta	6	6
(United States) M Shaughnessy	1	1
(Italy) R Vinci	5	1
(Germany) A-L Grönefeld	7	6
(Czech Republic) L Hradecká	2	6	1
(Romania) IR Olaru	6	2	6
Q	(Germany) J Görges	6	6
6	(Romania) S Cîrstea	3	3
3/WC	(Belgium) Y Wickmayer	7	6
(Switzerland) T Bacsinszky	6^{6}	4
(Austria) S Bammer	3	1
(Romania) A Dulgheru	6	6
(Germany) T Malek	7	7
Q	(France) A Rezaï	5	5
(Spain) A Parra Santonja	2	3
8	(Italy) S Errani	6	6

Second round
1	(Italy) F Pennetta	6	4	6
(Germany) A-L Grönefeld	3	6	2
(Romania) IR Olaru	3	6	7
Q	(Germany) J Görges	6	2	5
3/WC	(Belgium) Y Wickmayer	2	6	6
(Romania) A Dulgheru	6	3	1
(Germany) T Malek	3	0
8	(Italy) S Errani	6	6

Quarterfinals
1	(Italy) F Pennetta	7	6
(Romania) IR Olaru	5	2
3/WC	(Belgium) Y Wickmayer	7	6
8	(Italy) S Errani	5	3

Semifinals
1	(Italy) F Pennetta	6^{5}	3
3/WC	(Belgium) Y Wickmayer	7	6

=== Bottom half ===
First round
5	(Czech Republic) I Benešová	7	6
Q	(Germany) S Gehrlein	5	0
(Czech Republic) P Kvitová	6	6
(Germany) A Petkovic	1	4
(Belarus) O Govortsova	6	6^{7}	6
Q	(Croatia) P Martić	2	7	2
(Slovenia) K Srebotnik	2	4
4	(Spain) C Suárez Navarro	6	6
7	(Czech Republic) L Šafářová	6	6
WC	(Austria) P Mayr	2	1
(Poland) U Radwańska	7	6
WC	(Austria) Y Meusburger	6^{6}	1
(Germany) K Barrois	6	3	3
(France) A Cornet	4	6	6
(Romania) M Niculescu	4	2
2	(Poland) A Radwańska	6	6

Second round
5	(Czech Republic) I Benešová	4	5
(Czech Republic) P Kvitová	6	7
(Belarus) O Govortsova	3	4
4	(Spain) C Suárez Navarro	6	6
7	(Czech Republic) L Šafářová	6	6
(Poland) U Radwańska	4	4
(France) A Cornet	4	5
2	(Poland) A Radwańska	6	7

Quarterfinals
(Czech Republic) P Kvitová	7	6
4	(Spain) C Suárez Navarro	5	4
7	(Czech Republic) L Šafářová	3	6^{9}
2	(Poland) A Radwańska	6	7

Semifinals
(Czech Republic) P Kvitová	6	6
2	(Poland) A Radwańska	3	2
