= 2006 Generali Ladies Linz – Doubles =

Doubles
- 2006 Generali Ladies Linz

Final
- Champions: (United States) Lisa Raymond (Australia) Samantha Stosur
- Runners-up: (United States) Corina Morariu (Slovenia) Katarina Srebotnik
- Score: 6–3, 6–0

Details
- Draw: 16
- Seeds: 4

Events
Singles	Doubles
← 2005 ·	Linz Open	· 2007 →

Gisela Dulko and Květa Peschke were the defending champions, but competed this year with different partners. Dulko teamed up with Michaëlla Krajicek and lost in first round to Eleni Daniilidou and Jasmin Wöhr. Peschke teamed up with Francesca Schiavone, but the pair withdrew before their semifinal match against Corina Morariu and Katarina Srebotnik, as Schiavone had injured her right knee.

Lisa Raymond and Samantha Stosur won the title, defeating Morariu and Srebotnik in the final 6–3, 6–0.

== Seeds ==
1. (United States) Lisa Raymond / (Australia) Samantha Stosur (champions)
2. (Czech Republic) Květa Peschke / (Italy) Francesca Schiavone (semifinals, withdrew due to a right knee injury on Schiavone)
3. (Slovakia) Daniela Hantuchová / (Japan) Ai Sugiyama (quarterfinals, withdrew due to a right rib injury on Hantuchová)
4. (France) Nathalie Dechy / (Russia) Vera Zvonareva (first round, withdrew due to a left knee pain (tendonitis) on Dechy)

== Draw ==
=== Key ===
- Q = Qualifier
- WC = Wild card
- LL = Lucky loser
- Alt = Alternate
- ITF = ITF entry
- PR = Protected ranking
- SR = Special ranking
- SE = Special exempt
- JE = Junior exempt
- JR = Junior Accelerator Programme entrant
- CO = College Accelerator Programme entrant
- NG = Next Gen Accelerator Program entrant
- w/o = Walkover
- r = Retired
- d = Defaulted

=== Draw ===
First round
1	(United States) L Raymond (Australia) S Stosur	6	7^{7}
PR	(Germany) A-L Grönefeld (Australia) A Molik	2	6^{4}
(Ukraine) Y Fedak (Russia) E Vesnina	6	7
LL	(Germany) M Müller (Germany) J Schruff	4	5
3	(Slovakia) D Hantuchová (Japan) A Sugiyama	6	6
WC	(Austria) S Bammer (Austria) M Klaffner	4	0
(Argentina) G Dulko (Netherlands) M Krajicek	4	5
(Greece) E Daniilidou (Germany) J Wöhr	6	7
WC	(Serbia) J Janković (Slovenia) T Križan	7	5	6
PR	(United States) J Craybas (Slovakia) J Husárová	5	7	2
(United States) C Morariu (Slovenia) K Srebotnik	w/o
4	(France) N Dechy (Russia) V Zvonareva
Q	(Slovakia) J Gajdošová (Australia) B Stewart	2	2
(France) M Bartoli (Israel) S Pe'er	6	6
(Russia) A Rodionova (Romania) A Vanc	3	0
2	(Czech Republic) K Peschke (Italy) F Schiavone	6	6

Quarterfinals
1	(United States) L Raymond (Australia) S Stosur	w/o
(Ukraine) Y Fedak (Russia) E Vesnina
3	(Slovakia) D Hantuchová (Japan) A Sugiyama
(Greece) E Daniilidou (Germany) J Wöhr	w/o
WC	(Serbia) J Janković (Slovenia) T Križan	3	2
(United States) C Morariu (Slovenia) K Srebotnik	6	6
(France) M Bartoli (Israel) S Pe'er	6^{6}	7	4
2	(Czech Republic) K Peschke (Italy) F Schiavone	7^{8}	5	6

Semifinals
1	(United States) L Raymond (Australia) S Stosur	6	6
(Greece) E Daniilidou (Germany) J Wöhr	4	2
(United States) C Morariu (Slovenia) K Srebotnik	w/o
2	(Czech Republic) K Peschke (Italy) F Schiavone

Final
1	(United States) L Raymond (Australia) S Stosur	6	6
(United States) C Morariu (Slovenia) K Srebotnik	3	0
