= 2008 Generali Ladies Linz =

- Date: 20–26 October
- Edition: 22nd
- Category: Tier II Series
- Draw: 28S / 16D
- Location: Linz, Austria
- Venue: TipsArena Linz

Champions

Singles
- (Serbia) Ana Ivanovic

Doubles
- (Slovenia) Katarina Srebotnik / (Japan) Ai Sugiyama
| ← 2007 · | Generali Ladies Linz | · 2009 → |

The 2008 Generali Ladies Linz was a women's tennis tournament played on indoor hard courts. It was the 22nd edition of the Generali Ladies Linz, and was part of the Tier II Series of the 2008 WTA Tour. It took place at the TipsArena Linz in Linz, Austria, from 20 October until 26 October 2008. First-seeded Ana Ivanovic won the singles title.

== Finals ==
=== Singles ===
(Serbia) Ana Ivanovic defeated (Russia) Vera Zvonareva 6–2, 6–1

- It was Ana Ivanović's 3rd title of the year, and her 8th overall.

=== Doubles ===
(Slovenia) Katarina Srebotnik / (Japan) Ai Sugiyama defeated (Zimbabwe) Cara Black / (United States) Liezel Huber 6–4, 7–5
