= Linz Open =

Upper Austria Ladies Linz
- 2026 Upper Austria Ladies Linz

WTA Tour
- Founded: 1987; 39 years ago
- Editions: 39 (2026)
- Location: Linz; Austria
- Venue: Design Center Linz (2023–present), TipsArena Linz (2003–2022)
- Category: WTA 500 (2024–present), WTA 250 (2021–2023)
- Surface: Clay (indoor) (2026–present), Hard (indoor) (1987–2025)
- Draw: 28S / 16D
- Prize money: €1,049,083
- Website: ladieslinz.at

Current champions (2026)
- Singles: Mirra Andreeva
- Doubles: (Romania) Sorana Cîrstea (China) Zhang Shuai

The Linz Open or the Upper Austria Ladies Linz is a WTA 500 tennis tournament held in Linz, Austria. Since 2026, the tournament is held on indoor clay courts. It was played on indoor hardcourts until 2025.

The inaugural event took place in 1987 in Wels, Austria and was organized by the ITF as a $10,000 tournament. Starting 1991, it has been organized in Linz as a WTA Tour event, initially on the Tier V-level. In 1993 it got promoted to Tier III-level, and since 1998 it was organized as a Tier II-tournament. In 2009, it was designated as a International tournament and subsequently WTA 250 in 2021 with the change in tournament tier nomenclature. From 1999 to 2017 it was sponsored by Generali Gruppe. In 2023, the scheduling change in the WTA calendar saw the tournament being held in February instead of October as in the past editions. In 2024, the tournament was once again upgraded to a WTA 500-level event. Since 2026 the tournament is played in April.

Past champions of the tournament include former world number ones Lindsay Davenport, Justine Henin-Hardenne, Amélie Mauresmo, Maria Sharapova and Ana Ivanovic. More recent champions include Petra Kvitová, Victoria Azarenka, Angelique Kerber, Karolína Plíšková and Dominika Cibulková.

== Past finals ==
=== Singles ===
Year	Champion	Runner-up	Score
1987	(Austria) Barbara Paulus	(Czechoslovakia) Denisa Krajčovičová	6–2, 6–2
1988	(Czechoslovakia) Eva Švíglerová	(Austria) Marion Maruska	6–3, 6–1
1990^{1}	(Austria) Marion Maruska	(Luxembourg) Karin Kschwendt	3–6, 6–1, 6–4
1990^{2}	(Czechoslovakia) Monika Kratochvílová	(Austria) Katharina Büche	7–5, 6–3
↓ WTA Tier V ↓
1991	(Switzerland) Manuela Maleeva-Fragnière	(Czechoslovakia) Petra Langrová	6–4, 7–6^{(7–1)}
1992	(Ukraine) Natalia Medvedeva	(France) Pascale Paradis	6–4, 6–2
↓ WTA Tier III ↓
1993	(Switzerland) Manuela Maleeva-Fragnière (2)	(Spain) Conchita Martínez	6–2, 1–0 ret.
1994	(Belgium) Sabine Appelmans	(Germany) Meike Babel	6–1, 4–6, 7–6^{(7–3)}
1995	(Czech Republic) Jana Novotná	(Germany) Barbara Rittner	6–7^{(6–8)}, 6–3, 6–4
1996	(Belgium) Sabine Appelmans (2)	(France) Julie Halard	6–2, 6–4
1997	(United States) Chanda Rubin	(Slovakia) Karina Habšudová	6–4, 6–2
↓ WTA Tier II ↓
1998	(Czech Republic) Jana Novotná (2)	(Belgium) Dominique van Roost	6–1, 7–6^{(7–2)}
1999	(France) Mary Pierce	(France) Sandrine Testud	7–6^{(7–2)}, 6–1
2000	(United States) Lindsay Davenport	(United States) Venus Williams	6–4, 3–6, 6–2
2001	(United States) Lindsay Davenport (2)	(Serbia and Montenegro) Jelena Dokić	6–4, 6–1
2002	(Belgium) Justine Henin	(United States) Alexandra Stevenson	6–3, 6–0
2003	(Japan) Ai Sugiyama	(Russia) Nadia Petrova	7–5, 6–4
2004	(France) Amélie Mauresmo	(Russia) Elena Bovina	6–2, 6–0
2005	(Russia) Nadia Petrova	(Switzerland) Patty Schnyder	4–6, 6–3, 6–1
2006	(Russia) Maria Sharapova	(Russia) Nadia Petrova	7–5, 6–2
2007	(Slovakia) Daniela Hantuchová	(Switzerland) Patty Schnyder	6–4, 6–2
2008	(Serbia) Ana Ivanovic	(Russia) Vera Zvonareva	6–2, 6–1
↓ International tournament ↓
2009	(Belgium) Yanina Wickmayer	(Czech Republic) Petra Kvitová	6–3, 6–4
2010	(Serbia) Ana Ivanovic (2)	(Switzerland) Patty Schnyder	6–1, 6–2
2011	(Czech Republic) Petra Kvitová	(Slovakia) Dominika Cibulková	6–4, 6–1
2012	(Belarus) Victoria Azarenka	(Germany) Julia Görges	6–3, 6–4
2013	(Germany) Angelique Kerber	(Serbia) Ana Ivanovic	6–4, 7–6^{(8–6)}
2014	(Czech Republic) Karolína Plíšková	(Italy) Camila Giorgi	6–7^{(4–7)}, 6–3, 7–6^{(7–4)}
2015	(Russia) Anastasia Pavlyuchenkova	(Germany) Anna-Lena Friedsam	6–4, 6–3
2016	(Slovakia) Dominika Cibulková	(Switzerland) Viktorija Golubic	6–3, 7–5
2017	(Czech Republic) Barbora Strýcová	(Slovakia) Magdaléna Rybáriková	6–4, 6–1
2018	(Italy) Camila Giorgi	(Russia) Ekaterina Alexandrova	6–3, 6–1
2019	(United States) Coco Gauff	(Latvia) Jeļena Ostapenko	6–3, 1–6, 6–2
2020	(Belarus) Aryna Sabalenka	(Belgium) Elise Mertens	7–5, 6–2
↓ WTA 250 tournament ↓
2021	(United States) Alison Riske	(Romania) Jaqueline Cristian	2–6, 6–2, 7–5
2022	Not held		
2023	Anastasia Potapova	(Croatia) Petra Martić	6–3, 6–1
↓ WTA 500 tournament ↓
2024	(Latvia) Jeļena Ostapenko	Ekaterina Alexandrova	6–2, 6–3
2025	Ekaterina Alexandrova	(Ukraine) Dayana Yastremska	6–2, 3–6, 7–5
2026	Mirra Andreeva	(Austria) Anastasia Potapova	1–6, 6–4, 6–3

=== Doubles ===
Year	Champions	Runners-up	Score
1987	(Austria) Petra Hentschl (West Germany) Eva-Maria Schürhoff	(Austria) Barbara Paulus (Austria) Petra Ritter	6–4, 6–4
1988	(Austria) Marion Maruska (Austria) Petra Ritter	(Switzerland) Cristina Casini (Poland) Katarzyna Nowak	6–3, 6–4
1990^{1}	(France) Alexia Dechaume (France) Pascale Paradis	(Czechoslovakia) Hana Fukárková (Czechoslovakia) Denisa Krajčovičová	6–3, 6–2
1990^{2}	(Czechoslovakia) Regina Chladková (Czechoslovakia) Monika Kratochvílová	(Austria) Birgit Arming (Austria) Doris Bauer	6–4, 6–4
↓ WTA Tier V ↓
1991	(Switzerland) Manuela Maleeva-Fragnière (Italy) Raffaella Reggi	(Czechoslovakia) Petra Langrová (Czechoslovakia) Radka Zrubáková	6–4, 1–6, 6–3
1992	(Netherlands) Monique Kiene (Netherlands) Miriam Oremans	(Germany) Claudia Porwik (Italy) Raffaella Reggi-Concato	6–4, 6–2
↓ WTA Tier III ↓
1993	(Russia) Eugenia Maniokova (Georgia (country)) Leila Meskhi	(Spain) Conchita Martínez (Austria) Judith Polzl Wiesner	walkover
1994	(Russia) Eugenia Maniokova (2) (Georgia (country)) Leila Meskhi (2)	(Sweden) Åsa Carlsson (Germany) Caroline Schneider	6–2, 6–2
1995	(United States) Meredith McGrath (France) Nathalie Tauziat	(Croatia) Iva Majoli (Austria) Petra Schwarz	6–1, 6–2
1996	(Netherlands) Manon Bollegraf (United States) Meredith McGrath (2)	(Australia) Rennae Stubbs (Czech Republic) Helena Suková	6–4, 6–4
1997	(France) Alexandra Fusai (France) Nathalie Tauziat (2)	(Czech Republic) Eva Melicharová (Czech Republic) Helena Vildová	4–6, 6–3, 6–1
↓ WTA Tier II ↓
1998	(France) Alexandra Fusai (2) (France) Nathalie Tauziat (3)	(Russia) Anna Kournikova (Latvia) Larisa Savchenko Neiland	6–3, 3–6, 6–4
1999	(Romania) Irina Spîrlea (Netherlands) Caroline Vis	(Slovenia) Tina Križan (Latvia) Larisa Savchenko Neiland	6–4, 6–3
2000	(France) Amélie Mauresmo (United States) Chanda Rubin	(Japan) Ai Sugiyama (France) Nathalie Tauziat	6–4, 6–4
2001	(Federal Republic of Yugoslavia) Jelena Dokić (Russia) Nadia Petrova	(Belgium) Els Callens (United States) Chanda Rubin	6–1, 6–4
2002	(Federal Republic of Yugoslavia) Jelena Dokić (2) (Russia) Nadia Petrova (2)	(Japan) Rika Fujiwara (Japan) Ai Sugiyama	6–3, 6–2
2003	(South Africa) Liezel Huber (Japan) Ai Sugiyama	(France) Marion Bartoli (Italy) Silvia Farina Elia	6–1, 7–6^{(8–6)}
2004	(Slovakia) Janette Husárová (Russia) Elena Likhovtseva	(France) Nathalie Dechy (Switzerland) Patty Schnyder	6–2, 7–5
2005	(Argentina) Gisela Dulko (Czech Republic) Květa Hrdličková Peschke	(Spain) Conchita Martínez (Spain) Virginia Ruano Pascual	6–2, 6–3
2006	(United States) Lisa Raymond (Australia) Samantha Stosur	(United States) Corina Morariu (Slovenia) Katarina Srebotnik	6–3, 6–0
2007	(Zimbabwe) Cara Black (United States) Liezel Huber (2)	(Slovenia) Katarina Srebotnik (Japan) Ai Sugiyama	6–2, 3–6, [10–8]
2008	(Slovenia) Katarina Srebotnik (Japan) Ai Sugiyama (2)	(Zimbabwe) Cara Black (United States) Liezel Huber	6–4, 7–5
↓ International tournament ↓
2009	(Germany) Anna-Lena Grönefeld (Slovenia) Katarina Srebotnik (2)	(Poland) Klaudia Jans (Poland) Alicja Rosolska	6–1, 6–4
2010	(Czech Republic) Renata Voráčová (Czech Republic) Barbora Záhlavová-Strýcová	(Czech Republic) Květa Peschke (Slovenia) Katarina Srebotnik	7–5, 7–6^{(8–6)}
2011	(New Zealand) Marina Erakovic (Russia) Elena Vesnina	(Germany) Julia Görges (Germany) Anna-Lena Grönefeld	7–5, 6–1
2012	(Germany) Anna-Lena Grönefeld (2) (Czech Republic) Květa Peschke (2)	(Germany) Julia Görges (Czech Republic) Barbora Záhlavová-Strýcová	6–3, 6–4
2013	(Czech Republic) Karolína Plíšková (Czech Republic) Kristýna Plíšková	(Canada) Gabriela Dabrowski (Poland) Alicja Rosolska	7–6^{(8–6)}, 6–4
2014	(Romania) Raluca Olaru (United States) Anna Tatishvili	(Germany) Annika Beck (France) Caroline Garcia	6–2, 6–1
2015	(United States) Raquel Kops-Jones (United States) Abigail Spears	(Czech Republic) Andrea Hlaváčková (Czech Republic) Lucie Hradecká	6–3, 7–5
2016	(Netherlands) Kiki Bertens (Sweden) Johanna Larsson	(Germany) Anna-Lena Grönefeld (Czech Republic) Květa Peschke	4–6, 6–2, [10–7]
2017	(Netherlands) Kiki Bertens (2) (Sweden) Johanna Larsson (2)	(Russia) Natela Dzalamidze (Switzerland) Xenia Knoll	3–6, 6–3, [10–4]
2018	(Belgium) Kirsten Flipkens (Sweden) Johanna Larsson (3)	(United States) Raquel Atawo (Germany) Anna-Lena Grönefeld	4–6, 6–4, [10–5]
2019	(Czech Republic) Barbora Krejčíková (Czech Republic) Kateřina Siniaková	(Austria) Barbara Haas (Switzerland) Xenia Knoll	6–4, 6–3
2020	(Netherlands) Arantxa Rus (Slovenia) Tamara Zidanšek	(Czech Republic) Lucie Hradecká (Czech Republic) Kateřina Siniaková	6–3, 6–4
↓ WTA 250 tournament ↓
2021	(Russia) Natela Dzalamidze (Russia) Kamilla Rakhimova	(China) Wang Xinyu (China) Zheng Saisai	6–4, 6–2
2022	Not held		
2023	(Georgia (country)) Natela Dzalamidze (2) (Slovakia) Viktória Kužmová	(Germany) Anna-Lena Friedsam (Ukraine) Nadiia Kichenok	4–6, 7–5, [12–10]
↓ WTA 500 tournament ↓
2024	(Italy) Sara Errani (Italy) Jasmine Paolini	(United States) Nicole Melichar-Martinez (Australia) Ellen Perez	7–5, 4–6, [10–7]
2025	(Hungary) Tímea Babos (Brazil) Luisa Stefani	(Ukraine) Lyudmyla Kichenok (Ukraine) Nadiia Kichenok	3–6, 7–5, [10–4]
2026	(Romania) Sorana Cîrstea (China) Zhang Shuai	(Czech Republic) Jesika Malečková (Czech Republic) Miriam Škoch	6–3, 6–2

== See also ==
- List of tennis tournaments
