= Alona Bondarenko =

Ukrainian tennis player (born 1984)

Alona Bondarenko Альона Бондаренко
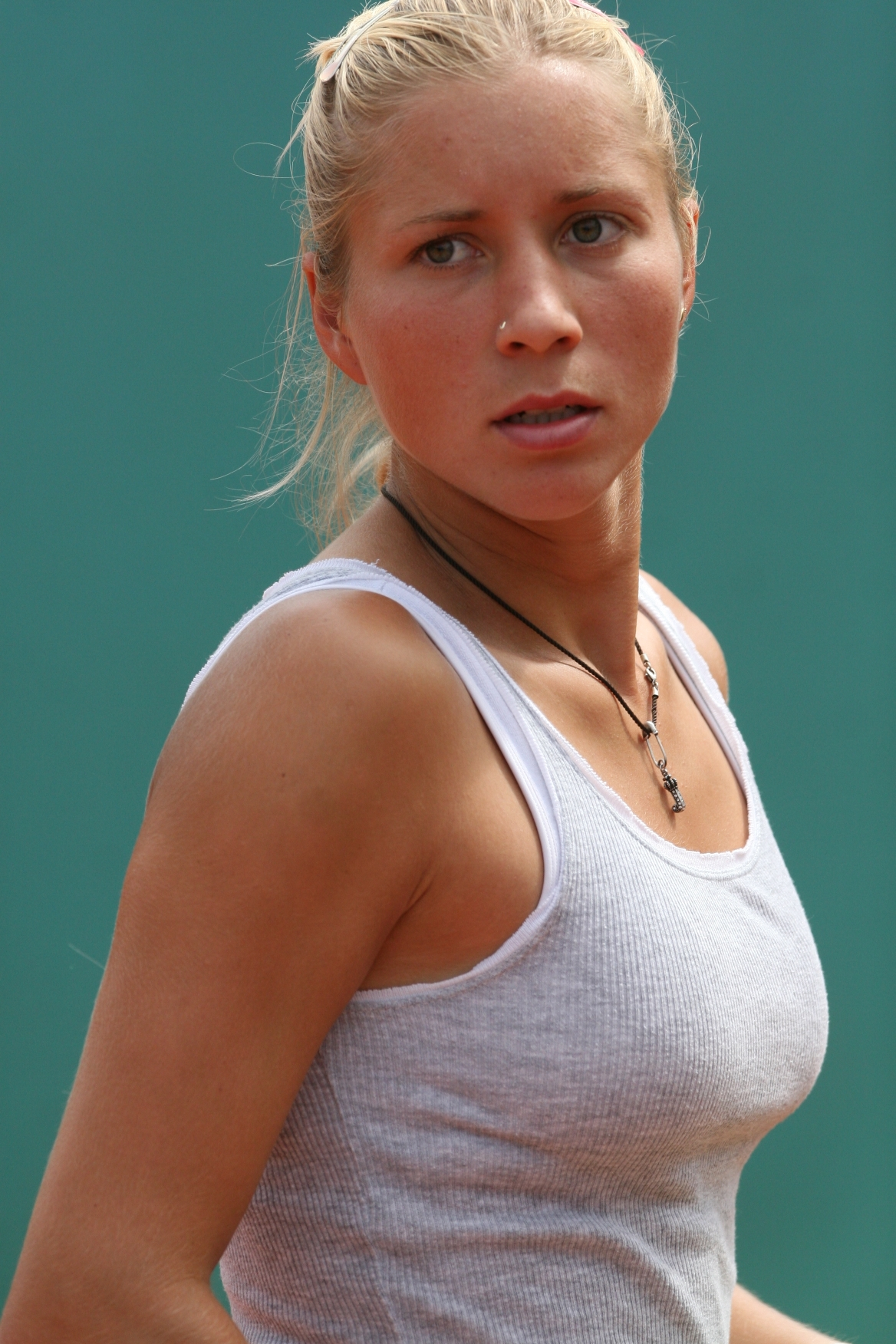
- Bondarenko at the 2008 French Open
- Country (sports): Ukraine
- Born: 13 August 1984 (age 42) Kryvyi Rih, Ukrainian SSR, Soviet Union
- Height: 1.68 m (5 ft 6 in)
- Turned pro: 1999
- Retired: 2011
- Plays: Right-handed (two-handed backhand)
- Prize money: $2,785,303

Singles
- Career record: 363–294
- Career titles: 2
- Highest ranking: No. 19 (14 April 2008)

Grand Slam singles results
- Australian Open: 4R (2010)
- French Open: 3R (2010)
- Wimbledon: 3R (2005, 2007, 2010)
- US Open: 3R (2007, 2008, 2010)

Doubles
- Career record: 195–193
- Career titles: 4
- Highest ranking: No. 11 (29 September 2008)

Grand Slam doubles results
- Australian Open: W (2008)
- French Open: SF (2008)
- Wimbledon: 2R (2007)
- US Open: 3R (2008)

Other doubles tournaments
- Olympic Games: SF (2008)

Team competitions
- Fed Cup: 22–12

Alona Volodymyrivna Bondarenko Dyachok (Ukrainian: Альона Володимирівна Бондаренко; born 13 August 1984) is a Ukrainian former tennis player. Her sisters Valeria and Kateryna Bondarenko are also tennis players.

Her career-high singles ranking is No. 19, achieved on 14 April 2008. Alona defeated former world No. 1, Jelena Janković, in the third round of the 2010 Australian Open, and won the 2008 Australian Open women's doubles title with her sister Kateryna, beating Victoria Azarenka and Shahar Pe'er in the finals. She also formerly paired with her older sister Valeria in doubles.

== Tennis career ==
=== Early years ===
Bondarenko started competing in the pro tour in 1999 at the age of 14. Then she competed in ITF Women's Circuit, where she reached two second rounds in Tallinn, Estonia, and Kharkiv, Ukraine.

She began the year 2000 reaching her first ITF final in Kalamata, Greece but ended up losing to Ekaterina Kozhokina 5–7, 5–7, even though not losing a set before the finals. She was only able to attain good success in two events, a semifinal in Kędzierzyn-Koźle and a quarterfinal in Sopot entering as a qualifier. The rest of the year she was failing to qualify in other events. In 2001, she failed to qualify in her first three events in Dubai, Caserta and Tallinn. However, she was able two reached two semifinals, in Kędzierzyn-Koźle and Tbilisi. She also managed to reach the quarterfinals in Batumi.

2002 was an inconsistent year, as she managed to reach the semifinals in Buchan before losing to Syna Schmidle in three sets and then followed it up by falling in the qualifying draw in Dubai. The following week, she reached the second round of Dinan after getting pass the qualifying draw and followed it up by once again failing to qualify. At her next event in Fontanafredda, she qualified for the main draw again, and won her first ITF title (final against Mara Santangelo). However, in her next six tournaments she was managing only to reach one second round. After her third final in Batumi, she made first-round exits in Joué-lès-Tours and Saint Raphael, both in France. She ended the year with a semifinal appearance in Poitiers, losing to Seda Noorlander, 2–6, 1–6.

In 2003, Bondarenko tried to qualify for main draws on the tour, but failed in Hobart, Melbourne, and Hyderabad. She then made it through her first WTA Tour main draw as a direct entry at the Copa Colsanitas, but ended up losing to Flavia Pennetta, 3–6, 1–6. She then went back to the ITF Circuit, after failing to qualify in the Abierto Mexicano, only making it through one semifinal (in Taranto) out of seven events. She also failed to qualify for the French Open and Wimbledon. In the middle of the two Grand Slam tournaments, she made the quarterfinals of the ITF events in Galatina and Fontanafredda. She also failed to qualify for the US Open. But after the US Open, she won her second ITF title in Zhukovskiy.

At the beginning of 2004, Bondarenko qualified for the first time and even claimed her first victory there, when she defeated Nuria Llagostera Vives in three sets before being double-bageled by eventual champion Fabiola Zuluaga in the next round. After that she then went back to the ITF Circuit where she won her third title in Bari, prevailing over younger sister Kateryna in the final, 2–6, 6–2, 6–4. After that, she failed to qualify in any of the WTA events she entered while falling early in the ITF events she entered. She then reached the final of Orbetello, losing to Catalina Castaño in three sets. She ended the year with a runner-up performance in Deauville, losing to Květa Peschke 0–6, 3–6, and quarterfinal appearances in the ITF events of Poitiers and Bergamo.

=== 2005 ===
In 2005, Alona made her Grand Slam debut at the Australian Open, where she suffered a first-round loss to sixth-seeded Elena Dementieva, 3–6, 3–6. Two weeks later, she reached her first WTA Tour quarterfinal at the Thailand Open where she lost to eventual runner-up, Anna-Lena Grönefeld, in straight sets.

The following week at Hyderabad, she reached her first tour final as the tournament's ninth seeded player, falling to hometown favourite Sania Mirza in three tight sets, 4–6, 7–5, 3–6. However, due to this result she made her first appearance in the top 100 of the WTA rankings. She then qualified for her first Tier-I event in the Indian Wells Open, and reached the second round before falling to top doubles player Lisa Raymond 6–4, 3–6, 3–6. She also qualified for the Miami Open but lost in the opening round to Alina Jidkova. She received a direct entry to the Estoril Open, reaching the second round before losing to third seed Gisela Dulko. In the Italian Open in Rome, she fell in the qualifying round. She then received direct entry in the İstanbul Cup, French Open, Birmingham Classic, all losing in the first round and failed to qualify in the Eastbourne International. She, however, made a shocking performance in Wimbledon, claiming her first Grand Slam match-win and upsetting 20th seed Tatiana Golovin in the first round, 6–3, 3–6, 7–5, before falling to Nathalie Dechy 1–6, 4–6 in the third round. She then made early exits at Modena, Palermo, in the Nordic Light Open and the US Open. Her last good performance of the year was in the Wismilak International where she reached the quarterfinals before losing to Li Na after defeating top Australian player Alicia Molik in the previous round. She ended the year for the first time inside the top 100, at 73.

=== 2006 ===
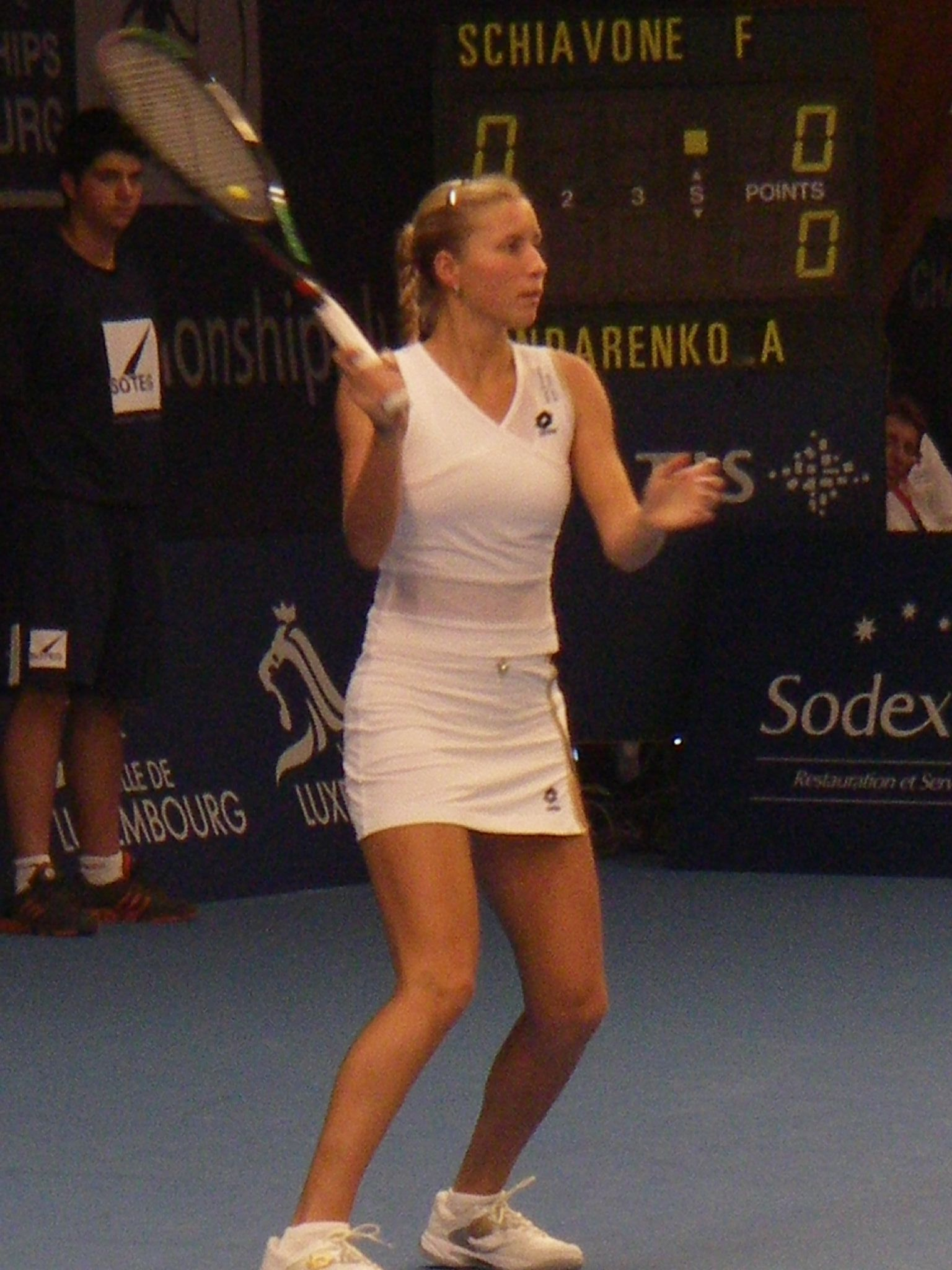
Bondarenko at the 2006 Winner Fortis Championships

2006 was a breakthrough year for Bondarenko as she made it inside the top 50, after quarterfinal appearances at Hobart and Bangalore, and first-round exits in Pattaya and at the Australian Open as well as early exits in Dubai, Doha, and Indian Wells. With her early exit in Indian Wells, Bondarenko decided to compete in Orange, California, an ITF event, claiming the title over Yvonne Meusburger 6–3, 7–5. Then she made stellar performances in the WTA Tour, making it to the third round of the Indian Wells Open entering as a qualifier, losing to Ana Ivanovic 3–6, 7–5, 3–6.

On the clay-court season, she made it through the second rounds of top events at the Amelia Island Championships, losing to Vera Dushevina 1–6, 4–6, and the Family Circle Cup, losing to eventual champion Nadia Petrova 1–6, 6–0, 2–6, the second set was the fewest games Petrova won in a set in the whole tournament. She made it through the quarterfinals of Prague Open, losing to eventual champion Shahar Pe'er 5–7, 0–6, and the semifinals of Morocco Open, losing to Martina Suchá 3–6, 2–6. She made first-round exits in the İstanbul Cup, French Open and Birmingham Classic but made it through the second round of the Rosmalen Open before falling to Jelena Janković 4–6, 6–1, 6–7 and then a first-round exit in Wimbledon.

In the US Open Series tournaments, she lost in the first round of the Stanford Classic and Canadian Open, the second round of San Diego Open and the US Open, and the third round of the LA Women's Championships. In her first tournament after the US Open, she won her first title in the Luxembourg Open, ousting Francesca Schiavone 6–3, 6–2 in the final. She was the second lowest-ranked player ever to win a Tier-II title, being ranked No. 62, the record is held by Kim Jones-Schaefer who was ranked No. 64. She also made it through the top 50 after her first title. She then failed to qualify in the Kremlin Cup and the Zurich Open, and ended the year ranked No. 32.

=== 2007 ===
Bondarenko started with a second-round loss to Alicia Molik at the Hobart International, 3–6, 5–7. At the Australian Open she made a valiant effort, beating two unseeded players to advance to the third round, losing to fourth seed Kim Clijsters. She then lost in the first round of the Qatar Open, third round at Indian Wells and second round at Miami. She also reached the third round at Amelia Island, losing to Jelena Janković.

On 7 May 2007 she finished runner-up to Justine Henin at the Tier II J&S Cup held in Warsaw, losing 1–6, 3–6. In the semifinals, she got the first top-ten win of her career over then No. 5 Svetlana Kuznetsova, in straight sets. The performance saw her rise into the top 30 for the first time, at No. 29.

She then followed it up with third-round appearances at German Open and Italian Open, losing to Serbians Ivanovic (retiring at 3–6, 0–5 down) and Janković respectively, which both of them eventually captured the title. She followed it by making the semifinals of the İstanbul Cup, losing to Dementieva 6–7, 2–6, once again, and this was the fourth time in a row that she has lost to the eventual champion. Despite this good performances she lost to the unseeded and lower-ranked Karin Knapp of Italy in three sets.

She however bounced back with good showings at the grass season, reaching the quarterfinals of both the Birmingham Classic and Rosmalen Open, losing both to Janković; this was her fourth loss to her in that year. She then hit her career high shortly after Wimbledon, where she made the third round before losing to Patty Schnyder 4–6, 6–3, 6–8 after holding a 4–1 lead in the final set. She then came out with a three straight loss in the second round of the San Diego Open, first rounds of Stanford Classic and Rogers Cup. But she rebounded just before the US Open with a quarterfinal showing at the New Haven Open, she then eventually reached the third round of the US Open, losing to Venus Williams. She then lost three straight matches in a row, two of them coming from Frenchwoman Marion Bartoli.

On 17 October 2007 Bondarenko beat Amélie Mauresmo 2–6, 6–4, 6–1 at the Zurich Open to reach her first ever Tier-I quarterfinal, but lost to Nicole Vaidišová there. She also reached the quarterfinals of the Linz Open, losing to eventual champion Daniela Hantuchová. She ended the year at No. 22. On 22 October, she passed $1 million in career prize money, the first player representing Ukraine to pass that milestone.

=== 2008 ===
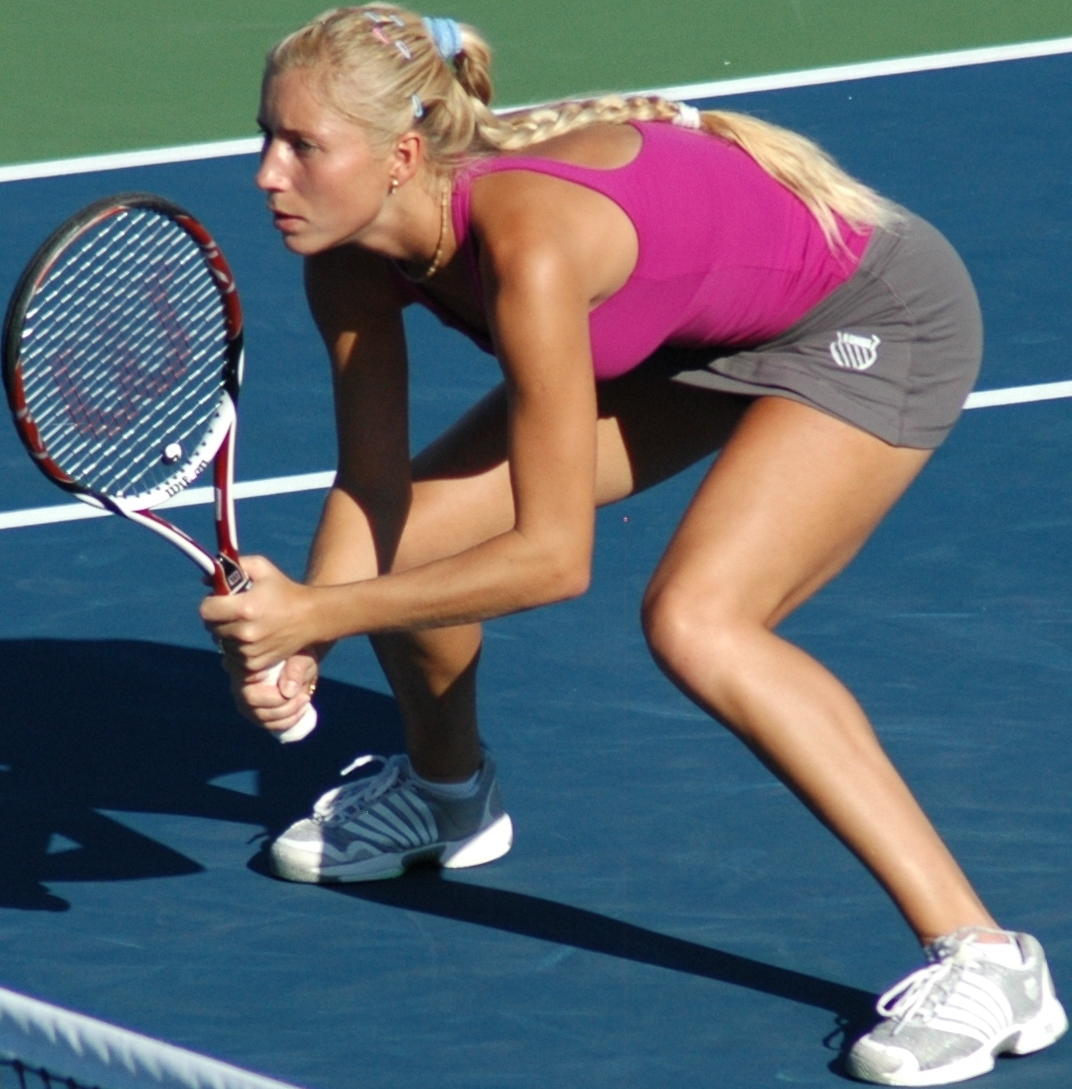
Bondarenko at the 2008 US Open

The beginning of the year brought second-round exits at the Hobart and Melbourne, losing to lower-ranked players. On the other hand, Bondarenko won the Australian Open women's doubles title, partnering with her younger sister Kateryna. They defeated the pairing Shahar Pe'er and Victoria Azarenka 2–6, 6–2, 6–4. They became only the second pairing of sisters to win the title, the first being the Williams sisters. She then followed it up with first-round exits at Paris and Antwerpen, once again losing to lower-ranked players. She also lost to eventual champion Dementieva at the Dubai Championships in the second round. She made her first third round of the year at the Indian Wells Open, losing to Maria Sharapova, this was the start of good showings from the Ukrainian. She, however, lost to Kaia Kanepi in the second round at Miami, after receiving a bye. Continuing her good form, she reached the quarterfinals of Amelia Island, Berlin, and Strasbourg. In the middle of this, she lost in the second round of the Italian Open reasonably to Serena Williams. Her performance at a major once again was a disappointment as she lost in the first round of the French Open to Petra Cetkovská.

She then again made great showing at the grass. She reached the quarterfinals of Birmingham by defeating Virginia Ruano Pascual and Sunitha Rao before falling to Marina Erakovic. Alona also reached the semifinals in Rosmalen, losing to eventual champion Tamarine Tanasugarn, she however lost at the second round of Wimbledon. She then represented Ukraine at the 2008 Olympics, losing to Serbian Jelena Janković in the second round, in the doubles she partnered with sister Kateryna and they came in fourth place. She then reached the third round of the US Open, losing to Venus Williams. She then lost in the second rounds of Porsche Tennis Grand Prix and Zurich Open and the first round of Kremlin Cup to higher ranked players Jelena Janković, Venus Williams, and Katarina Srebotnik. She ended the year competing in the Ladies Linz where she lost her quarterfinal match to Marion Bartoli.

=== 2009 ===
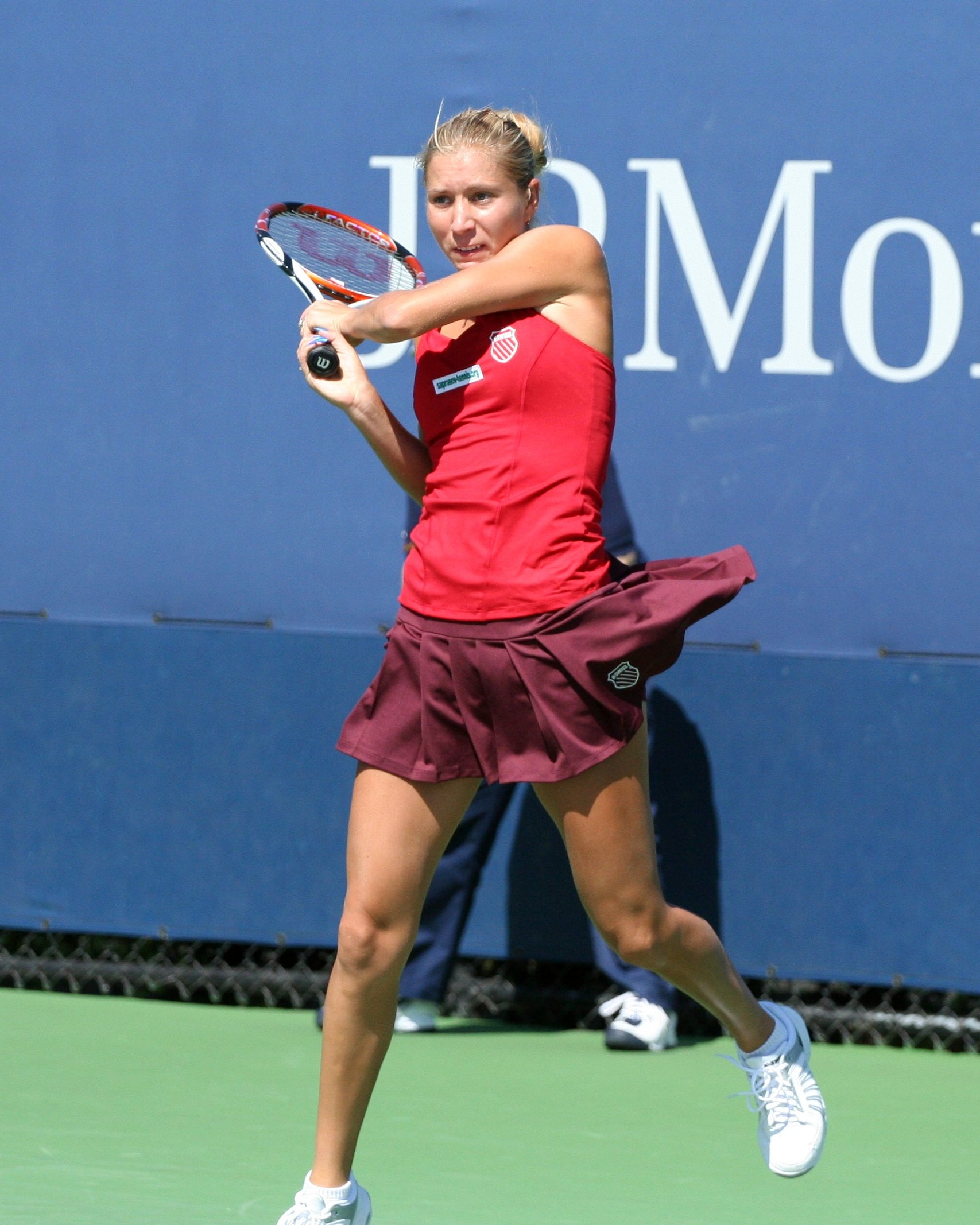
Bondarenko at the 2009 US Open

The first three months of the year Bondarenko made only one victory in three tournaments and no victories in the other three. However, she managed to reach the third round of the Australian Open, losing to Svetlana Kuznetsova in a tight two-setter. At Amelia Island, she reached her first quarterfinal of the year. In the first round, she defeated Sania Mirza 6–4, 6–3 to set up a clash with sister Kateryna. Alona came from a set down to win 4–6, 6–4, 6–3 before losing to Nadia Petrova in three sets. She then made it to the second round of Family Circle Cup and first round of the Italian Open. She then gave Ukraine two victories at the second week of the Fed Cup playoffs.

At the Madrid Open, Bondarenko defeated Kuznetsova in the second round and Anna Chakvetadze in the third before falling to world No. 1, Dinara Safina, in the quarterfinals. She defeated former world No. 1, Maria Sharapova, 6–2, 6–2 in the quarterfinals of the 2009 red clay event in Warsaw, and Anne Keothavong 6–2, 7–5 in the semifinals. She fell to Alexandra Dulgheru in the final, in three sets.

At the French Open, Bondarenko fell to 20th seed Dominika Cibulková in the first round in three sets. She then performed badly at grass unable to duplicate her performance in the past two years, losing in the second round of the Rosmalen Open and first round of Wimbledon to Elena Baltacha. She then made it to her first semifinal since the 2007 İstanbul Cup, which was more than two years ago. She then lost to sister Kateryna 1–6, 3–6 in the first round of the Prague Open breaking the tie between the two as she trails her sister 3–4 in head-to-head now. She then reached the third rounds of LA Championships, losing to Sharapova in three, and Rogers Cup, losing to Serena Williams. She then reached the second rounds of Cincinnati Open and Connecticut Open. In the first round of the US Open she beat Alla Kudryavtseva 3–6, 6–3, 6–2, but lost to Gisela Dulko in the second round. In her first tournament since the US Open, she lost in the first round of the Pan Pacific Open to Vera Dushevina 6–1, 5–7, 1–6. She lost in the third round of the China Open to Svetlana Kuznetsova 3–6, 6–4, 0–6 after defeating Ágnes Szávay and Sara Errani both in straight sets. She played her last tournament of the year at the Kremlin Cup, where she beat Anna Chakvetadze, Nadia Petrova and Tsvetana Pironkova all in straight sets before losing to eventual champion Francesca Schiavone in the semifinals in straight sets as well.

=== 2010 ===
Alona started the year off at the Hobart International. As the fourth seed, she reached the final defeating Sybille Bammer, Alizé Cornet, seventh seed Zheng Jie, and top seed Anabel Medina Garrigues. In the final, Alona defeated second seed Shahar Pe'er to win her second WTA singles title and her first title in over three years. Seeded 31st at the Australian Open, Alona made it to the fourth round beating qualifier Kathrin Wörle, Polona Hercog, and eighth seed Jelena Janković. She lost her fourth round match to Zheng Jie.

Playing for Ukraine in the Fed Cup tie versus Italy, Alona won her first rubber over Francesca Schiavone, but she lost her second rubber to Flavia Pennetta. Italy ended up winning the tie over Ukraine 4–1. After Fed Cup, Alona played at the Dubai Tennis Championships. She was defeated in the first round by Andrea Petkovic. Seeded 20th at the Indian Wells Open, Alona lost in the second round to Peng Shuai. Seeded 21st at the Miami Open, Alona was defeated in the second round by Gisela Dulko.

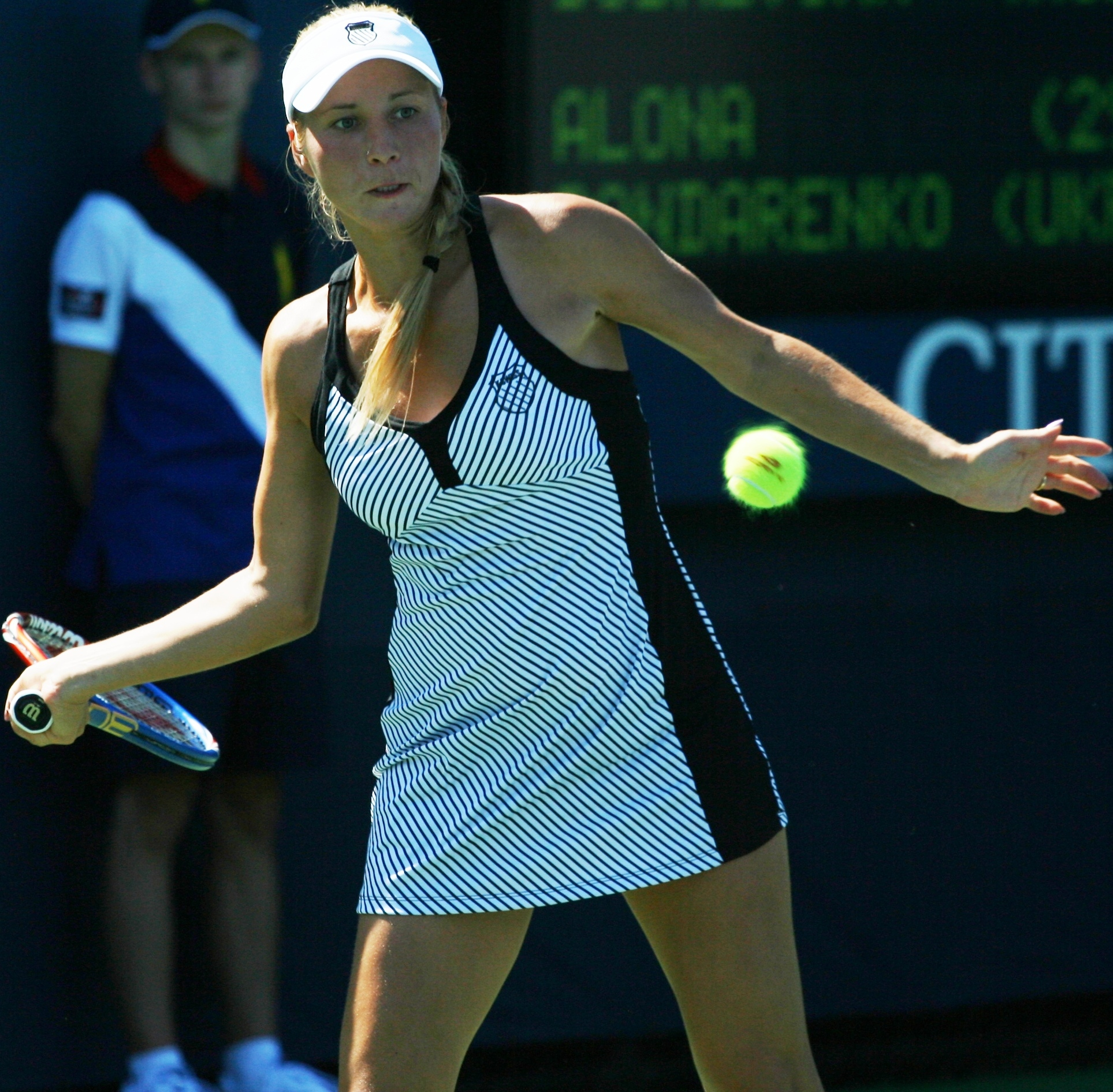
Bondarenko at the 2010 US Open

Alona started her clay-court season at Amelia Island. Seeded second, she lost in the first round to eventual finalist Olga Govortsova. In Charleston at the Family Circle Cup, Alona was the ninth seed. She reached the third round after wins over Julie Ditty and Bethanie Mattek-Sands. She was defeated in her third-round match by seventh seed and eventual finalist Vera Zvonareva. In the Fed Cup tie against Australia, Alona lost her match to Anastasia Rodionova. Ukraine ended up losing to Australia 0–5. After playing Fed Cup in Ukraine, Alona flew to Madrid to compete at the Madrid Open. In the first round, she came back from a set down to defeat Magdaléna Rybáriková. She then gained the biggest win of her career by defeating world No. 2, Caroline Wozniacki in the second round. Alona was defeated in the third round by 13th seed Li Na. Seeded sixth at the Warsaw Open, Alona was upset by qualifier Gréta Arn in the quarterfinals. Seeded 27th at the French Open, Alona reached the third round for the first time, but she lost to fourth seed Jelena Janković.

Seeded 28th at Wimbledon, Alona was defeated in the third round by fourth seed Jelena Janković.

Alona began her US Open series at the Southern California Open. She lost in the first round to Dinara Safina. In Cincinnati at the Western & Southern Open, Alona was defeated in the second round by 16th seed Marion Bartoli. At the Canadian Open, she lost in the first round to qualifier Jarmila Groth. Alona played her final tournament before the US Open at the Connecticut Open. She fell in the first round to sixth seed Marion Bartoli. Seeded 29th at the US Open, Alona reached the third round after victories over Vera Dushevina and last year quarterfinalist Melanie Oudin. She lost in the third round to sixth seed Francesca Schiavone.

In Tokyo at the Pan Pacific Open, she was defeated in the second round by third seed Jelena Janković. At the China Open, Alona lost in the second round to 13th seed Nadia Petrova. Seeded third at the Linz Open, she suffered a first-round loss at the hands of Roberta Vinci. Alona played her final tournament of the season at the Kremlin Cup, and was defeated in the second round by eighth seed María José Martínez Sánchez.

She ended the year ranked 36.

=== 2011: Retirement ===
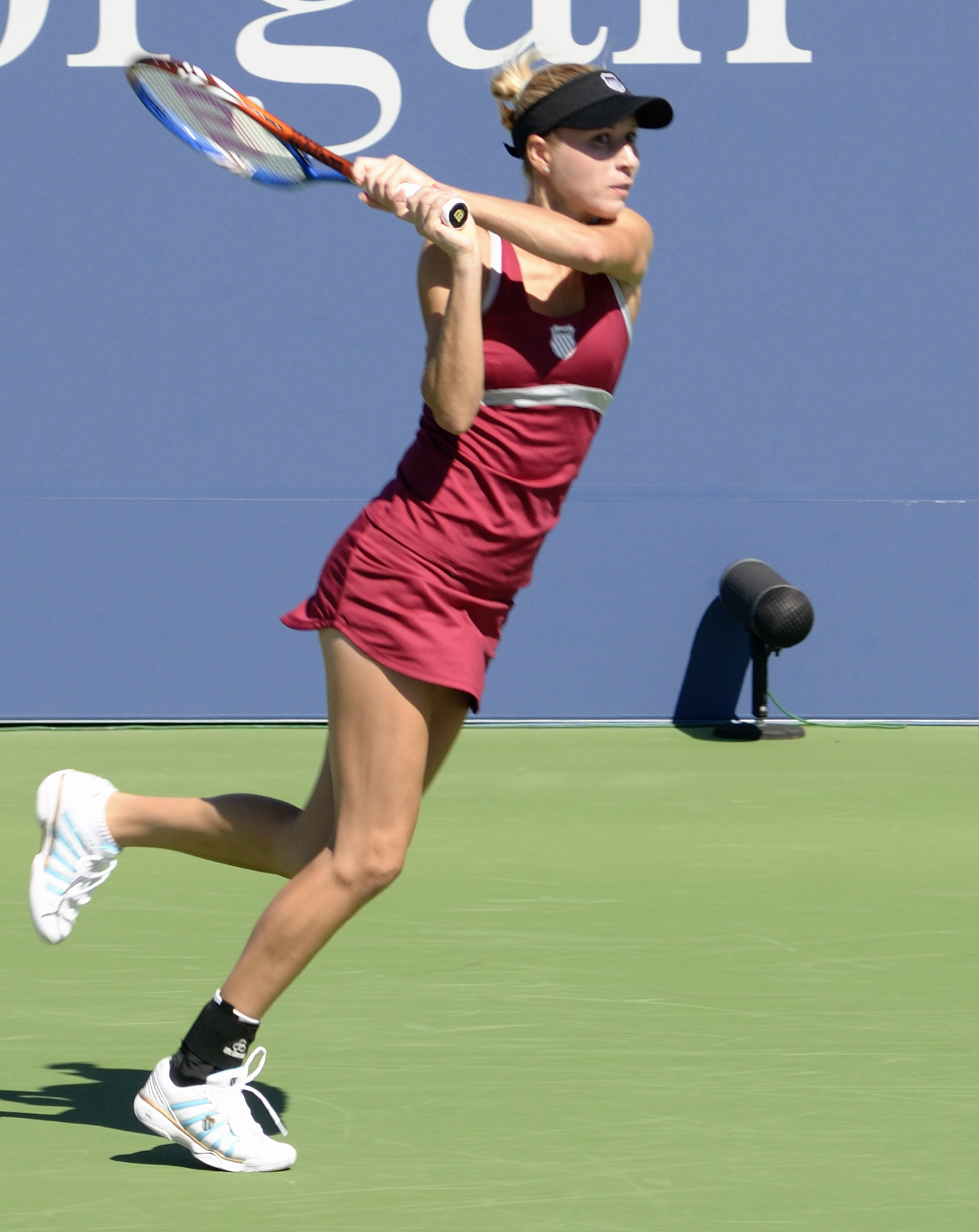
Bondarenko at the 2011 US Open, her last Grand Slam event

Bondarenko withdrew from the Hobart International and the Australian Open.

== Coaches and personal life ==
She was coached by her mother Natalia Bondarenko and her husband Nikolay Dyachok. On 30 May 2015, she gave birth to a son.

== Olympic Games medal matches ==
=== Doubles ===
Outcome	Year	Location	Surface	Partner	Opponents	Score
4th place	2008	Beijing	Hard	(Ukraine) Kateryna Bondarenko	(China) Zheng Jie (China) Yan Zi	2–6, 2–6

== WTA Tour finals ==
=== Singles: 5 (2 titles, 3 runner-ups) ===
Legend (pre/post 2010) Grand Slam tournaments Tier I / Premier M & Premier 5 Tier II / Premier (1–2) Tier III, IV & V / International (1–1)	Finals by surface Hard (2–1) Grass (0–0) Clay (0–2) Carpet (0–0)

Result	W/L	Date	Tournament	Surface	Opponent	Score
Loss	0–1	Feb 2005	Hyderabad Open, India	Hard	(India) Sania Mirza	4–6, 7–5, 3–6
Win	1–1	Sep 2006	Luxembourg Open	Hard (i)	(Italy) Francesca Schiavone	6–3, 6–2
Loss	1–2	May 2007	Warsaw Open, Poland	Clay	(Belgium) Justine Henin	1–6, 3–6
Loss	1–3	May 2009	Warsaw Open, Poland	Clay	(Romania) Alexandra Dulgheru	6–7, 6–3, 0–6
Win	2–3	Jan 2010	Hobart International, Australia	Hard	(Israel) Shahar Pe'er	6–2, 6–4

=== Doubles: 6 (4 titles, 2 runner-ups) ===
Legend (pre/post 2010) Grand Slam tournaments (1–0) Tier I / Premier M & Premier 5 (0–0) Tier II / Premier (1–0) Tier III, IV & V / International (2–2)	Finals by surface Hard (2–1) Grass (0–0) Clay (2–1) Carpet (0–0)

Result	W/L	Date	Tournament	Surface	Partner	Opponents	Score
Win	1–0	May 2006	İstanbul Cup, Turkey	Clay	(Belarus) Anastasiya Yakimova	(India) Sania Mirza (Australia) Alicia Molik	6–2, 6–4
Win	2–0	Jan 2008	Australian Open, Melbourne	Hard	(Ukraine) Kateryna Bondarenko	(Belarus) Victoria Azarenka (Israel) Shahar Pe'er	2–6, 6–1, 6–4
Win	3–0	Feb 2008	Paris Indoor, France	Hard (i)	(Ukraine) Kateryna Bondarenko	(Czech Republic) Vladimíra Uhlířová (Czech Republic) Eva Hrdinová	6–1, 6–4
Loss	3–1	Jan 2009	Hobart International, Australia	Hard	(Ukraine) Kateryna Bondarenko	(Argentina) Gisela Dulko (Italy) Flavia Pennetta	2–6, 6–7^{(4–7)}
Loss	3–2	Jul 2009	Budapest Grand Prix, Hungary	Clay	(Ukraine) Kateryna Bondarenko	(Russia) Alisa Kleybanova (Romania) Monica Niculescu	4–6, 6–7^{(5–7)}
Win	4–2	Jul 2009	Prague Open, Czech Republic	Clay	(Ukraine) Kateryna Bondarenko	(Czech Republic) Iveta Benešová (Czech Republic) Barbora Záhlavová-Strýcová	6–1, 6–2

== ITF Circuit finals ==
$100,000 tournaments
$75,000 tournaments
$50,000 tournaments
$25,000 tournaments
$10,000 tournaments

=== Singles: 9 (5–4) ===
Result	No.	Date	Tournament	Surface	Opponent	Score
Loss	1.	27 March 2000	ITF Kalamata, Greece	Carpet	(Russia) Ekaterina Kozhokina	5–7, 5–7
Win	1.	24 June 2002	ITF Fontanafredda, Italy	Clay	(Italy) Mara Santangelo	6–3, 6–0
Loss	2.	23 September 2002	Batumi Ladies Open, Georgia	Hard	(Belarus) Nadejda Ostrovskaya	6–1, 2–6, 4–6
Win	2.	7 September 2003	ITF Zhukovskiy, Russia	Clay	(Ukraine) Olga Savchuk	6–2, 6–3
Win	3.	19 April 2004	ITF Bari, Italy	Clay	(Ukraine) Katerina Bondarenko	2–6, 6–2, 6–4
Loss	3.	29 June 2004	ITF Orbetello, Italy	Clay	(Colombia) Catalina Castaño	6–2, 2–6, 3–6
Loss	4.	15 November 2004	ITF Deauville, France	Carpet (i)	(Czech Republic) Květa Peschke	0–6, 3–6
Win	4.	19 March 2006	ITF Orange, United States	Hard	(Austria) Yvonne Meusburger	6–3, 7–5
Win	5.	10 September 2007	ITF Kharkiv, Ukraine	Hard	(Serbia) Vesna Dolonc	6–1, 6–1

=== Doubles: 15 (8–7) ===
Result	No.	Date	Tournament	Surface	Partner	Opponents	Score
Loss	1.	25 April 1999	ITF Hvar, Croatia	Clay	(Ukraine) Valeria Bondarenko	(New Zealand) Shelley Stephens (New Zealand) Rewa Hudson	2–6, 6–4, 3–6
Loss	2.	6 June 1999	ITF Kędzierzyn-Koźle, Poland	Clay	(Ukraine) Valeria Bondarenko	(Poland) Katarzyna Teodorowicz-Lisowska (Poland) Anna Bieleń-Żarska	7–5, 4–6, 1–6
Win	1.	18 June 2000	ITF Kędzierzyn-Koźle, Poland	Clay	(Ukraine) Valeria Bondarenko	(Ukraine) Elena Kovalchuk (Ukraine) Olga Lazarchuk	6–4, 6–2
Loss	3.	12 August 2001	ITF Kędzierzyn-Koźle, Poland	Clay	(Ukraine) Valeria Bondarenko	(Czech Republic) Petra Raclavská (Czech Republic) Blanka Kumbárová	1–6, 2–6
Win	2.	20 October 2002	Open de Touraine, France	Hard (i)	(Ukraine) Valeria Bondarenko	(Germany) Jasmin Wöhr (Czech Republic) Michaela Paštiková	7–6^{(4)}, 4–6, 6–3
Win	3.	1 June 2003	ITF Warsaw, Poland	Clay	(Ukraine) Valeria Bondarenko	(France) Iryna Brémond (Ukraine) Olga Lazarchuk	6–3, 6–4
Loss	4.	24 August 2002	Maribor Open, Slovenia	Clay	(Russia) Olga Kalyuzhnaya	(Slovenia) Tina Hergold (Hungary) Eszter Molnár	1–6, 1–6
Win	4.	1 September 2003	ITF Zhukovskiy, Russia	Clay	(Ukraine) Valeria Bondarenko	(Russia) Gulnara Fattakhetdinova (Russia) Maria Kondratieva	6–7^{(6)}, 6–4, 6–3
Loss	5.	18 April 2004	ITF Biarritz, France	Clay	(Ukraine) Valeria Bondarenko	(Ukraine) Mariya Koryttseva (Ukraine) Elena Tatarkova	5–7, 0–6
Win	5.	4 July 2004	ITF Orbetello, Italy	Clay	(Russia) Galina Fokina	(Romania) Andreea Ehritt-Vanc (Ukraine) Yuliana Fedak	6–7^{(5)}, 6–2, 7–5
Win	6.	25 July 2004	ITF Innsbruck, Austria	Clay	(Russia) Galina Fokina	(Slovakia) Stanislava Hrozenská (Czech Republic) Lenka Němečková	6–2, 6–4
Win	7.	26 September 2004	Batumi Ladies Open, Georgia	Hard	(Russia) Galina Fokina	(Russia) Anna Bastrikova (Russia) Irina Kotkina	6–2, 6–2
Loss	6.	15 November 2005	ITF Deauville, France	Clay (i)	(Ukraine) Kateryna Bondarenko	(France) Stéphanie Cohen-Aloro (Tunisia) Selima Sfar	3–6, 1–6
Win	8.	14 March 2006	ITF Orange, United States	Hard	(Ukraine) Kateryna Bondarenko	(Canada) Stéphanie Dubois (United States) Lilia Osterloh	6–2, 6–4
Loss	7.	12 September 2007	ITF Kharkiv, Ukraine	Hard	(Ukraine) Kateryna Bondarenko	(Ukraine) Mariya Koryttseva (Belarus) Darya Kustova	6–7^{(10)}, 3–6

== Performance timelines ==
=== Singles ===
Key
W	F	SF	QF	#R	RR	Q#	P#	DNQ	A	Z#	PO	G	S	B	NMS	NTI	P	NH

(W) winner; (F) finalist; (SF) semifinalist; (QF) quarterfinalist; (#R) rounds 4, 3, 2, 1; (RR) round-robin stage; (Q#) qualification round; (P#) preliminary round; (DNQ) did not qualify; (A) absent; (Z#) Davis/Fed Cup Zonal Group (with number indication) or (PO) play-off; (G) gold, (S) silver or (B) bronze Olympic/Paralympic medal; (NMS) not a Masters tournament; (NTI) not a Tier I tournament; (P) postponed; (NH) not held; (SR) strike rate (events won / competed); (W–L) win–loss record.

Tournament	1999	2000	2001	2002	2003	2004	2005	2006	2007	2008	2009	2010	2011	SR	W–L
Grand Slam tournaments
Australian Open	A	A	A	A	Q2	Q1	1R	1R	3R	2R	3R	4R	A	0 / 8	10–6
French Open	A	A	A	A	Q1	Q1	1R	1R	2R	1R	1R	3R	1R	0 / 9	3–7
Wimbledon	A	A	A	A	Q1	Q2	3R	1R	3R	2R	1R	3R	1R	0 / 9	8–7
US Open	A	A	A	A	Q2	Q3	1R	2R	3R	3R	2R	3R	1R	0 / 9	11–7
Win–loss	0–0	0–0	0–0	0–0	0–0	0–0	2–4	1–4	7–4	4–4	3–4	9–4	0–3	0 / 27	26–27
Olympic Games
Summer Olympics	NH	A	not held			A	not held			2R	not held			0 / 1	1–1
Premier Mandatory tournaments
Indian Wells	A	A	A	A	A	A	2R	1R	3R	4R	2R	2R	A	0 / 6	5–7
Key Biscayne	A	A	A	A	A	A	1R	3R	2R	2R	2R	2R	A	0 / 6	7–6
Madrid	NH										QF	3R	A	0 / 2	5–2
Beijing	NH					not Tier I					3R	2R	1R	0 / 3	4–3
Premier 5 tournaments
Dubai	not Tier I										2R	1R	A	0 / 1	1–2
Rome	A	A	A	A	A	A	Q2	A	3R	2R	1R	A	A	0 / 3	3–3
Cincinnati Open	NH					not Tier I					2R	3R	2R	0 / 3	4–3
Montreal / Toronto	A	A	A	A	A	A	A	1R	1R	A	3R	3R	1R	0 / 5	4–5
Tokyo	A	A	A	A	A	A	A	A	A	A	1R	3R	A	0 / 2	2–2
Career statistics
Tournaments played	6	10	9	15	30	31	29	29	25	23	27	20	8	262	
Titles / Finals	0–0	0–1	0–0	1–2	1–1	1–3	0–1	2–2	1–2	0–0	0–1	1–1	0–0	7 / 262	7–14
Win–loss	6–7	17–11	19–9	35–14	26–31	42–30	24–30	42–27	36–24	28–23	33–26	25–21	3–8	7 / 262	336–261
Year-end ranking	652	493	376	191	190	126	73	32	22	32	32	36	253		

== Top 10 wins ==
#	Player	Rank	Event	Surface	Rd	Score	ABR
2007
1.	(Russia) Svetlana Kuznetsova	No. 5	Warsaw Cup, Poland	Clay	SF	6–2, 7–6^{(7–4)}	No. 40
2008
2.	(Russia) Svetlana Kuznetsova	No. 4	German Open	Clay	3R	1–6, 6–2, 6–2	No. 25
3.	(Russia) Anna Chakvetadze	No. 8	Ordina Open, Netherlands	Grass	QF	6–2, 3–6, 6–2	No. 29
2009
4.	(Russia) Svetlana Kuznetsova	No. 7	Madrid Open, Spain	Clay	2R	6–3, 6–2	No. 46
5.	(Russia) Nadia Petrova	No. 10	Cincinnati Open, U.S.	Hard	1R	6–2, 6–3	No. 34
2010
6.	(Serbia) Jelena Janković	No. 8	Australian Open	Hard	3R	6–2, 6–3	No. 30
7.	(Denmark) Caroline Wozniacki	No. 2	Madrid Open, Spain	Clay	2R	6–2, 6–3	No. 26
