= 2001 Generali Ladies Linz =

- Date: 22–28 October
- Edition: 15th
- Category: Tier II Series
- Draw: 28S / 16D
- Prize money: $565,000
- Surface: Hard (indoor)
- Location: Linz, Austria
- Venue: Design Center Linz

Champions

Singles
- (United States) Lindsay Davenport

Doubles
- (Federal Republic of Yugoslavia) Jelena Dokic / (Russia) Nadia Petrova
← 2000 ·	Linz Open	· 2002 →

The 2001 Generali Ladies Linz is the 2001 Tier II WTA Tour tournament of the annually-held Generali Ladies Linz tennis tournament. It was the 15th edition of the tournament and was held from October 22–28, 2001 at the Design Center Linz. First-seeded Lindsay Davenport won the singles title.

== Finals ==
=== Singles ===
(United States) Lindsay Davenport defeated (Federal Republic of Yugoslavia) Jelena Dokic, 6–4, 6–1.

- It was Davenport's 37th WTA singles title, and 7th title of the year. Davenport was also the defending champion.

=== Doubles ===
(Federal Republic of Yugoslavia) Jelena Dokic / (Russia) Nadia Petrova defeated (Belgium) Els Callens / (United States) Chanda Rubin, 6–1, 6–4.

- It was Dokic's 1st WTA doubles title. It was Petrova's 2nd WTA doubles title, and second of the year. This was their first doubles title together as a pair.

== Points and prize money ==
=== Point distribution ===
Event	W	F	SF	QF	Round of 16	Round of 32	Q	Q3	Q2	Q1
Singles	195	137	88	49	25	1	11.75	6.75	4	1
Doubles	195	137	88	49	1	—	11.75	—	—	—

=== Prize money ===
Event	W	F	SF	QF	Round of 16	Round of 32	Q3	Q2	Q1
Singles	$95,500	$51,000	$27,300	$14,600	$7,820	$4,175	$2,230	$1,195	$640
Doubles *	$30,000	$16,120	$8,620	$4,610	$2,465	—	—	—	—

_{* per team}

== Singles main draw entrants ==
=== Seeds ===
Country	Player	Rank	Seed
USA	Lindsay Davenport	3	1
BEL	Justine Henin	7	2
FR Yugoslavia	Jelena Dokic	10	3
FRA	Nathalie Tauziat	11	4
RUS	Elena Dementieva	13	5
FRA	Sandrine Testud	14	6
BUL	Magdalena Maleeva	16	7
ESP	Arantxa Sánchez Vicario	18	8

Rankings are as of 15 October 2001.

=== Other entrants ===
The following players received wildcards into the singles main draw:

- (United States) Lindsay Davenport
- (Austria) Evelyn Fauth
- (Austria) Barbara Schwartz

The following players received entry from the qualifying draw:

- (Russia) Anastasia Myskina
- (Russia) Tatiana Panova
- (Paraguay) Rossana de los Ríos
- (United States) Alexandra Stevenson

The following player received entry as a lucky loser:

- (Czech Republic) Denisa Chládková

=== Withdrawals ===
- (United States) Venus Williams → replaced by (Czech Republic) Denisa Chládková

== Doubles main draw entrants ==
=== Seeds ===
Country	Player	Country	Player	Player 1 Rank	Player 2 Rank	Seed
RUS	Elena Likhovtseva	JPN	Ai Sugiyama	7	4	1
USA	Kimberly Po-Messeli	FRA	Nathalie Tauziat	9	3	2
ESP	Virginia Ruano Pascual	ARG	Paola Suárez	8	5	3
AUT	Barbara Schett	NED	Caroline Vis	18	21	4

Rankings are as of 15 October 2001.

=== Other entrants ===
The following pair received wildcards into the doubles main draw:

- (Czech Republic) Denisa Chládková / (Austria) Barbara Schwartz

The following pair received entry from the qualifying draw:

- (Hungary) Petra Mandula / (Austria) Patricia Wartusch
