= 2001 Generali Ladies Linz – Doubles =

Doubles
- 2001 Generali Ladies Linz

Final
- Champions: (Federal Republic of Yugoslavia) Jelena Dokic (Russia) Nadia Petrova
- Runners-up: (Belgium) Els Callens (United States) Chanda Rubin
- Score: 6–1, 6–4

Details
- Draw: 16
- Seeds: 4

Events
Singles	Doubles
← 2000 ·	Linz Open	· 2002 →

Amélie Mauresmo and Chanda Rubin were the defending champions, but Mauresmo chose not to participate this year. Rubin participated with Els Callens, but the pair lost in the final to Jelena Dokic and Nadia Petrova, 6–1, 6–4.

== Seeds ==
1. (Russia) Elena Likhovtseva / (Japan) Ai Sugiyama (quarterfinals)
2. (United States) Kimberly Po-Messerli / (France) Nathalie Tauziat (first round)
3. (Spain) Virginia Ruano Pascual / (Argentina) Paola Suárez (quarterfinals)
4. (Austria) Barbara Schett / (Netherlands) Caroline Vis (first round)

== Draw ==
=== Key ===
- Q = Qualifier
- WC = Wild card
- LL = Lucky loser
- Alt = Alternate
- ITF = ITF entry
- PR = Protected ranking
- SR = Special ranking
- SE = Special exempt
- JE = Junior exempt
- JR = Junior Accelerator Programme entrant
- CO = College Accelerator Programme entrant
- NG = Next Gen Accelerator Program entrant
- w/o = Walkover
- r = Retired
- d = Defaulted

=== Draw ===
First round
1	(Russia) E Likhovtseva (Japan) A Sugiyama	6	6
WC	(Czech Republic) D Chládková (Austria) B Schwartz	4	2
(Slovenia) T Križan (Slovenia) K Srebotnik	4	4
(Federal Republic of Yugoslavia) J Dokic (Russia) N Petrova	6	6
4	(Austria) B Schett (Netherlands) C Vis	6	3	3
(Croatia) I Majoli (Slovakia) H Nagyová	4	6	6
(Sweden) Å Carlsson (Slovakia) K Habšudová	2	3
Q	(Hungary) P Mandula (Austria) P Wartusch	6	6
(Ukraine) E Tatarkova (Uzbekistan) I Tulyaganova	7^{7}	6
(United States) M Navratilova (Spain) A Sánchez Vicario	6^{4}	4
(Italy) T Garbin (Slovakia) J Husárová	6	3	4
3	(Spain) V Ruano Pascual (Argentina) P Suárez	4	6	6
(Argentina) L Montalvo (Spain) M Serna	5	3
(Belgium) E Callens (United States) C Rubin	7	6
(France) S Testud (Italy) R Vinci	7	7^{7}
2	(United States) K Po-Messerli (France) N Tauziat	5	6^{4}

Quarterfinals
1	(Russia) E Likhovtseva (Japan) A Sugiyama	1	2
(Federal Republic of Yugoslavia) J Dokic (Russia) N Petrova	6	6
(Croatia) I Majoli (Slovakia) H Nagyová	5	3
Q	(Hungary) P Mandula (Austria) P Wartusch	7	6
(Ukraine) E Tatarkova (Uzbekistan) I Tulyaganova	6	6
3	(Spain) V Ruano Pascual (Argentina) P Suárez	2	3
(Belgium) E Callens (United States) C Rubin	6	6
(France) S Testud (Italy) R Vinci	3	4

Semifinals
(Federal Republic of Yugoslavia) J Dokic (Russia) N Petrova	6	6
Q	(Hungary) P Mandula (Austria) P Wartusch	1	1
(Ukraine) E Tatarkova (Uzbekistan) I Tulyaganova	1	7^{8}	4
(Belgium) E Callens (United States) C Rubin	6	6^{6}	6

Final
(Federal Republic of Yugoslavia) J Dokic (Russia) N Petrova	6	6
(Belgium) E Callens (United States) C Rubin	1	4

== Qualifying ==
=== Seeds ===
1. (Hungary) Petra Mandula / (Austria) Patricia Wartusch (qualified)
2. (Slovenia) Maja Matevžič / (Spain) Cristina Torrens Valero (first round)

=== Qualifiers ===
1. (Hungary) Petra Mandula / (Austria) Patricia Wartusch

=== Draw ===
First round
1	(Hungary) Petra Mandula (Austria) Patricia Wartusch	8
WC	(Austria) Daniela Kix (Austria) Jenny Zika	2
(Russia) Elena Dementieva (Russia) Anastasia Myskina	8
2	(Slovenia) Maja Matevžič (Spain) Cristina Torrens Valero	2

Qualifying competition
1	(Hungary) Petra Mandula (Austria) Patricia Wartusch	4	6	7
(Russia) Elena Dementieva (Russia) Anastasia Myskina	6	4	5
