= 2004 Generali Ladies Linz – Doubles =

Doubles
- 2004 Generali Ladies Linz

Final
- Champions: (Slovakia) Janette Husárová (Russia) Elena Likhovtseva
- Runners-up: (France) Nathalie Dechy (Switzerland) Patty Schnyder
- Score: 6–2, 7–5

Events
Singles	Doubles
← 2003 ·	Linz Open	· 2005 →

Liezel Huber and Ai Sugiyama were the defending champions, but they were defeated in the quarterfinals by Nathalie Dechy and Patty Schnyder.

Janette Husárová and Elena Likhovtseva won the title, defeating Dechy and Schnyder in the final 6–2, 7–5.

== Seeds ==
1. (Slovakia) Janette Husárová / (Russia) Elena Likhovtseva (champions)
2. (South Africa) Liezel Huber / (Japan) Ai Sugiyama (quarterfinals)
3. (Spain) Magüi Serna / (Venezuela) María Vento-Kabchi (first round)
4. (France) Marion Bartoli / (Slovakia) Daniela Hantuchová (quarterfinals)

== Draw ==
=== Key ===
- Q = Qualifier
- WC = Wild card
- LL = Lucky loser
- Alt = Alternate
- SE = Special exempt
- PR = Protected ranking
- ITF = ITF entry
- JE = Junior exempt
- w/o = Walkover
- r = Retired
- d = Defaulted
- SR = Special ranking

=== Draw ===
First round
1	(Slovakia) J Husárová (Russia) E Likhovtseva	3	6	6
(Czech Republic) D Chládková (Switzerland) E Gagliardi	6	4	2
(Slovenia) T Križan (Slovenia) K Srebotnik	7^{7}	6
WC	(Croatia) K Šprem (Russia) V Zvonareva	6^{2}	3
4	(France) M Bartoli (Slovakia) D Hantuchová	7^{7}	6
PR	(Germany) J Schruff (Sweden) Å Svensson	6^{4}	2
(Austria) B Schett (Austria) P Wartusch	7^{7}	6
WC	(Austria) D Kix (Austria) Y Meusburger	6^{5}	3
(Czech Republic) G Navrátilová (Czech Republic) M Paštiková	6	6
(Russia) A Jidkova (United States) J Russell	4	2
(Czech Republic) I Benešová (Czech Republic) E Birnerová	6	6
3	(Spain) M Serna (Venezuela) M Vento-Kabchi	2	2
(France) C Dhenin (Croatia) S Talaja	0	1
(France) N Dechy (Switzerland) P Schnyder	6	6
Q	(Serbia and Montenegro) J Janković (Germany) C Schneider	4	1
2	(South Africa) L Huber (Japan) A Sugiyama	6	6

Quarterfinals
1	(Slovakia) J Husárová (Russia) E Likhovtseva	6	6
(Slovenia) T Križan (Slovenia) K Srebotnik	3	3
4	(France) M Bartoli (Slovakia) D Hantuchová	3	4
(Austria) B Schett (Austria) P Wartusch	6	6
(Czech Republic) G Navrátilová (Czech Republic) M Paštiková	6	6
(Czech Republic) I Benešová (Czech Republic) E Birnerová	0	2
(France) N Dechy (Switzerland) P Schnyder	7^{7}	6
2	(South Africa) L Huber (Japan) A Sugiyama	6^{2}	2

Semifinals
1	(Slovakia) J Husárová (Russia) E Likhovtseva	6	6
(Austria) B Schett (Austria) P Wartusch	2	4
(Czech Republic) G Navrátilová (Czech Republic) M Paštiková	7^{7}	3	1
(France) N Dechy (Switzerland) P Schnyder	6^{4}	6	6

Final
1	(Slovakia) J Husárová (Russia) E Likhovtseva	6	7
(France) N Dechy (Switzerland) P Schnyder	2	5

== Qualifying ==
=== Seeds ===
1. (Argentina) Erica Krauth / (Germany) Jasmin Wöhr (first round)
2. (Poland) Marta Domachowska / (Ukraine) Yuliana Fedak (qualifying competition)

=== Qualifiers ===
1. (Serbia and Montenegro) Jelena Janković / (Germany) Caroline Schneider

=== Draw ===
First round
1	(Argentina) Erica Krauth (Germany) Jasmin Wöhr	5
(Serbia and Montenegro) Jelena Janković (Germany) Caroline Schneider	8
(Austria) Daniela Klemenschits (Austria) Sandra Klemenschits	5
2	(Poland) Marta Domachowska (Ukraine) Yuliana Fedak	8

Qualifying competition
(Serbia and Montenegro) Jelena Janković (Germany) Caroline Schneider	7	7
2	(Poland) Marta Domachowska (Ukraine) Yuliana Fedak	5	5
