= 2002 Generali Ladies Linz – Singles =

Singles
- 2002 Generali Ladies Linz

Final
- Champion: (Belgium) Justine Henin
- Runner-up: (United States) Alexandra Stevenson
- Score: 6–3, 6–0

Details
- Draw: 28
- Seeds: 8

Events
Singles	Doubles
← 2001 ·	Linz Open	· 2003 →

Lindsay Davenport was the two-time defending champion, but she withdrew due to injury.

Justine Henin won the title, defeating Alexandra Stevenson in the final 6–3, 6–0.

== Seeds ==
The top four seeds who played received a bye into the second round.

1. (United States) Jennifer Capriati (quarterfinals)
2. (United States) Lindsay Davenport (withdrew)
3. (Federal Republic of Yugoslavia) Jelena Dokic (quarterfinals)
4. (Belgium) Justine Henin (champion)
5. (Slovakia) Daniela Hantuchová (semifinals)
6. (Russia) Anastasia Myskina (second round)
7. (United States) Chanda Rubin (semifinals)
8. (Italy) Silvia Farina Elia (quarterfinals)
9. (Israel) Anna Smashnova (quarterfinals)

== Draw ==
=== Key ===
- Q = Qualifier
- WC = Wild card
- LL = Lucky loser
- Alt = Alternate
- ITF = ITF entry
- PR = Protected ranking
- SR = Special ranking
- SE = Special exempt
- JE = Junior exempt
- JR = Junior Accelerator Programme entrant
- CO = College Accelerator Programme entrant
- NG = Next Gen Accelerator Program entrant
- w/o = Walkover
- r = Retired
- d = Defaulted

=== Finals ===
Semifinals
(United States) Alexandra Stevenson	6	7^{8}
5	(Slovakia) Daniela Hantuchová	4	6^{6}
4	(Belgium) Justine Henin	7^{7}	6
7	(United States) Chanda Rubin	6^{1}	4

Finals
(United States) Alexandra Stevenson	3	0
4	(Belgium) Justine Henin	6	6

=== Top half ===
First round
(Argentina) P Suárez	7^{7}	4	6
(Croatia) I Majoli	6^{5}	6	1
(United States) A Stevenson	6	6
(Spain) C Martínez	1	2
Q	(Czech Republic) D Chládková	6^{5}	1
6	(Russia) A Myskina	7^{7}	6
WC	(Austria) P Wartusch	0	3
WC	(Austria) B Schett	6	6
(Russia) E Dementieva	6	6
(Japan) A Sugiyama	1	4
(United States) M Shaughnessy	6	5	3
9	(Israel) A Smashnova	1	7	6

Second round
1	(United States) J Capriati	6	6
(Argentina) P Suárez	4	4
(United States) A Stevenson	6	7^{7}
6	(Russia) A Myskina	3	6^{5}
5	(Slovakia) D Hantuchová	6	7
WC	(Austria) B Schett	1	5
(Russia) E Dementieva	3	6	5
9	(Israel) A Smashnova	6	3	7

Quarterfinals
1	(United States) J Capriati	1	1
(United States) A Stevenson	6	6
5	(Slovakia) D Hantuchová	6	4	6
9	(Israel) A Smashnova	1	6	4

Semifinals
(United States) A Stevenson	6	7^{8}
5	(Slovakia) D Hantuchová	4	6^{6}

=== Bottom half ===
First round
8	(Italy) S Farina Elia	7^{7}	6
(Italy) F Schiavone	6^{5}	3
Q	(Switzerland) M-G Mikaelian	6	6
Q	(Germany) A Barna	4	3
Q	(Russia) L Krasnoroutskaya	4	1
(Russia) T Panova	6	6
7	(United States) C Rubin	6	6
(Greece) E Daniilidou	3	4
LL	(Hungary) P Mandula	3	1
(Russia) N Petrova	6	6
LL	(United States) J Craybas	6	3
WC	(Austria) D Kix	2	0^{r}

Second round
8	(Italy) S Farina Elia	6	6
Q	(Switzerland) M-G Mikaelian	4	3
(Russia) T Panova	2	1
4	(Belgium) J Henin	6	6
7	(United States) C Rubin	6	6
(Russia) N Petrova	2	4
LL	(United States) J Craybas	2	1
3	(Federal Republic of Yugoslavia) J Dokic	6	6

Quarterfinals
8	(Italy) S Farina Elia	6^{6}	2
4	(Belgium) J Henin	7^{8}	6
7	(United States) C Rubin	7	6
3	(Federal Republic of Yugoslavia) J Dokic	5	2

Semifinals
4	(Belgium) J Henin	7^{7}	6
7	(United States) C Rubin	6^{1}	4

== Qualifying ==
=== Seeds ===
1. (Switzerland) Marie-Gaïané Mikaelian (qualified)
2. (Slovenia) Maja Matevžič (withdrew)
3. (United States) Jill Craybas (qualifying competition; Lucky loser)
4. (Spain) Virginia Ruano Pascual (second round)
5. (Germany) Anca Barna (qualified)
6. (Czech Republic) Denisa Chládková (qualified)
7. (Croatia) Jelena Kostanić Tošić (first round)
8. (Croatia) Silvija Talaja (second round)

=== Qualifiers ===
1. (Switzerland) Marie-Gaïané Mikaelian
2. (Russia) Lina Krasnoroutskaya
3. (Czech Republic) Denisa Chládková
4. (Germany) Anca Barna

=== Lucky losers ===
1. (United States) Jill Craybas
2. (Hungary) Petra Mandula

=== Draw ===
==== First qualifier ====
First round
1	(Switzerland) Marie-Gaïané Mikaelian	6	6
Alt	(Bulgaria) Maria Geznenge	3	1
(Canada) Maureen Drake	6^{1}	6	6^{5}
(Czech Republic) Libuše Průšová	7^{7}	3	7^{7}
(Hungary) Petra Mandula	6	6
WC	(Austria) Elisabeth Bahn	3	2
(Czech Republic) Zuzana Ondrášková	6	6
7	(Croatia) Jelena Kostanić Tošić	2	1

Second round
1	(Switzerland) Marie-Gaïané Mikaelian	6	6
(Czech Republic) Libuše Průšová	4	3
(Hungary) Petra Mandula	6	6
(Czech Republic) Zuzana Ondrášková	2	2

Qualifying competition
1	(Switzerland) Marie-Gaïané Mikaelian	6	6
(Hungary) Petra Mandula	0	1

==== Second qualifier ====
First round
WC	(Austria) Caroline Forstner	0	0
(Sweden) Åsa Svensson	6	6
(Chinese Taipei) Janet Lee	2	3
(Indonesia) Wynne Prakusya	6	6
(Russia) Lina Krasnoroutskaya	6	6
WC	(Austria) Tina Schiechtl	1	1
Alt	(Germany) Vanessa Paffrath	1	0
8	(Croatia) Silvija Talaja	6	6

Second round
(Sweden) Åsa Svensson	6	2	3
(Indonesia) Wynne Prakusya	3	6	6
(Russia) Lina Krasnoroutskaya	6	6
8	(Croatia) Silvija Talaja	2	4

Qualifying competition
(Indonesia) Wynne Prakusya	3	0
(Russia) Lina Krasnoroutskaya	6	6

==== Third qualifier ====
First round
3	(United States) Jill Craybas	6	6
WC	(Austria) Jenny Zika	2	1
WC	(Hungary) Anna-Maria Földényi-Dicker	1	2
(France) Stéphanie Foretz	6	6
(Czech Republic) Alena Neštická	2	0
(Czech Republic) Sandra Kleinová	6	6
(Hungary) Anikó Kapros	2	2
6	(Czech Republic) Denisa Chládková	6	6

Second round
3	(United States) Jill Craybas	6	7
(France) Stéphanie Foretz	3	5
(Czech Republic) Sandra Kleinová	6	6^{8}	2
6	(Czech Republic) Denisa Chládková	3	7^{10}	6

Qualifying competition
3	(United States) Jill Craybas	1	3
6	(Czech Republic) Denisa Chládková	6	6

==== Fourth qualifier ====
First round
4	(Spain) Virginia Ruano Pascual	6	6
(Belarus) Tatiana Poutchek	2	3
(Germany) Angelika Rösch	6	5	1
(Slovakia) Ľudmila Cervanová	4	7	6
(Germany) Gréta Arn	7^{7}	7^{8}
(Germany) Marlene Weingärtner	6^{5}	6^{6}
(Austria) Evelyn Fauth	0	1
5	(Germany) Anca Barna	6	6

Second round
4	(Spain) Virginia Ruano Pascual	6	4	2^{r}
(Slovakia) Ľudmila Cervanová	4	6	4
(Germany) Gréta Arn	2	2
5	(Germany) Anca Barna	6	6

Qualifying competition
(Slovakia) Ľudmila Cervanová	2	6	2
5	(Germany) Anca Barna	6	3	6
