= 2001 Generali Ladies Linz – Singles =

Singles
- 2001 Generali Ladies Linz

Final
- Champion: (United States) Lindsay Davenport
- Runner-up: (Federal Republic of Yugoslavia) Jelena Dokic
- Score: 6–4, 6–1

Details
- Draw: 28
- Seeds: 8

Events
Singles	Doubles
← 2000 ·	Linz Open	· 2002 →

Lindsay Davenport was the defending champion, and she successfully defended her title, defeating Jelena Dokic in the final, 6–4, 6–1.

== Seeds ==
The top four seeds received a bye into the second round.

1. (United States) Lindsay Davenport (champion)
2. (Belgium) Justine Henin (second round)
3. (Federal Republic of Yugoslavia) Jelena Dokic (final)
4. (France) Nathalie Tauziat (second round)
5. (Russia) Elena Dementieva (second round)
6. (France) Sandrine Testud (quarterfinals)
7. (Bulgaria) Magdalena Maleeva (semifinals)
8. (Spain) Arantxa Sánchez Vicario (second round)

== Draw ==
=== Key ===
- Q = Qualifier
- WC = Wild card
- LL = Lucky loser
- Alt = Alternate
- ITF = ITF entry
- PR = Protected ranking
- SR = Special ranking
- SE = Special exempt
- JE = Junior exempt
- JR = Junior Accelerator Programme entrant
- CO = College Accelerator Programme entrant
- NG = Next Gen Accelerator Program entrant
- w/o = Walkover
- r = Retired
- d = Defaulted

=== Finals ===
Semifinals
1/WC	(United States) Lindsay Davenport	6	6
7	(Bulgaria) Magdalena Maleeva	2	2
3	(Federal Republic of Yugoslavia) Jelena Dokic	6	4	6
(Uzbekistan) Iroda Tulyaganova	2	6	0

Finals
1/WC	(United States) Lindsay Davenport	6	6
3	(Federal Republic of Yugoslavia) Jelena Dokic	4	1

=== Top half ===
First round
(Russia) N Petrova	3	6	6^{5}
(Czech Republic) D Bedáňová	6	1	7^{7}
(Russia) E Likhovtseva	3	7	7
LL	(Czech Republic) D Chládková	6	5	5
(Spain) Á Montolio	6^{2}	4
6	(France) S Testud	7^{7}	6
(United States) C Rubin	6	6
(Slovakia) H Nagyová	2	1
(Austria) B Schett	6	6^{1}	3
(Japan) A Sugiyama	3	7^{7}	6
(Argentina) P Suárez	5	1
7	(Bulgaria) M Maleeva	7	6

Second round
1/WC	(United States) L Davenport	7^{8}	6
(Czech Republic) D Bedáňová	6^{6}	0
(Russia) E Likhovtseva	4	2
6	(France) S Testud	6	6
4	(France) N Tauziat	6	5	3
(United States) C Rubin	3	7	6
(Japan) A Sugiyama	6	3	1
7	(Bulgaria) M Maleeva	1	6	6

Quarterfinals
1/WC	(United States) L Davenport	6	7^{9}
6	(France) S Testud	1	6^{7}
(United States) C Rubin	3	3
7	(Bulgaria) M Maleeva	6	6

Semifinals
1/WC	(United States) L Davenport	6	6
7	(Bulgaria) M Maleeva	2	2

=== Bottom half ===
First round
8	(Spain) A Sánchez Vicario	6^{2}	6	6
(Spain) M Serna	7^{7}	2	0
Q	(United States) A Stevenson	7^{7}	6
(Spain) C Torrens Valero	6^{4}	2
WC	(Austria) E Fauth	7	4	0
(Croatia) I Majoli	5	6	6
5	(Russia) E Dementieva	6	6
WC	(Austria) B Schwartz	1	0
Q	(Paraguay) R de los Ríos	2	3
Q	(Russia) T Panova	6	6
Q	(Russia) A Myskina	2	2
(Uzbekistan) I Tulyaganova	6	6

Second round
8	(Spain) A Sánchez Vicario	3	6	0
Q	(United States) A Stevenson	6	3	6
(Croatia) I Majoli	6^{3}	7^{8}	3
3	(Federal Republic of Yugoslavia) J Dokic	7^{7}	6^{6}	6
5	(Russia) E Dementieva	2	4
Q	(Russia) T Panova	6	6
(Uzbekistan) I Tulyaganova	6^{1}	6	6
2	(Belgium) J Henin	7^{7}	0	3

Quarterfinals
Q	(United States) A Stevenson	3	5
3	(Federal Republic of Yugoslavia) J Dokic	6	7
Q	(Russia) T Panova	2	4
(Uzbekistan) I Tulyaganova	6	6

Semifinals
3	(Federal Republic of Yugoslavia) J Dokic	6	4	6
(Uzbekistan) I Tulyaganova	2	6	0

== Qualifying ==
=== Seeds ===
1. (Russia) Tatiana Panova (qualified)
2. (Czech Republic) Denisa Chládková (qualifying competition; Lucky loser)
3. (Paraguay) Rossana de los Ríos (qualified)
4. (Hungary) Petra Mandula (first round)
5. (Russia) Anastasia Myskina (qualified)
6. (Slovakia) Janette Husárová (qualifying competition)
7. (Czech Republic) Adriana Gerši (second round)
8. (United States) Alexandra Stevenson (qualified)

=== Qualifiers ===
1. (Russia) Tatiana Panova
2. (United States) Alexandra Stevenson
3. (Paraguay) Rossana de los Ríos
4. (Russia) Anastasia Myskina

=== Lucky losers ===
1. (Czech Republic) Denisa Chládková

=== Draw ===
==== First qualifier ====
First round
1	(Russia) Tatiana Panova	4	7	6
(Czech Republic) Alena Vašková	6	5	2
(Czech Republic) Sandra Kleinová	6	2	0
(United States) Jill Craybas	4	6	6
(Sweden) Åsa Carlsson	7	6^{5}	6
(Germany) Martina Müller	5	7^{7}	3
(Czech Republic) Klára Koukalová	0	6	3
6	(Slovakia) Janette Husárová	6	3	6

Second round
1	(Russia) Tatiana Panova	7	6
(United States) Jill Craybas	5	3
(Sweden) Åsa Carlsson	6	6
6	(Slovakia) Janette Husárová	4	3

Qualifying competition
1	(Russia) Tatiana Panova	6	6
6	(Slovakia) Janette Husárová	3	0

==== Second qualifier ====
First round
2	(Czech Republic) Denisa Chládková	6	7^{7}
WC	(Austria) Patricia Wartusch	4	6^{3}
Alt	(Italy) Valentina Sassi	6	6
WC	(Austria) Jenny Zika	1	2
(Czech Republic) Michaela Paštiková	6	3	6
(Italy) Maria Elena Camerin	3	6	0
(Germany) Anca Barna	5	1
8	(United States) Alexandra Stevenson	7	6

Second round
2	(Czech Republic) Denisa Chládková	6	6
Alt	(Italy) Valentina Sassi	2	1
(Czech Republic) Michaela Paštiková	2	2
8	(United States) Alexandra Stevenson	6	6

Qualifying competition
2	(Czech Republic) Denisa Chládková	0	4
8	(United States) Alexandra Stevenson	6	6

==== Third qualifier ====
First round
3	(Paraguay) Rossana de los Ríos	7^{7}	6
WC	(Austria) Tina Schiechtl	6^{2}	2
(Hungary) Anikó Kapros	4	1
(Croatia) Jelena Kostanić	6	6
WC	(Austria) Daniela Kix	4	6	2
(United States) Samantha Reeves	6	4	6
(Slovakia) Ľudmila Cervanová	1	1
7	(Czech Republic) Adriana Gerši	6	6

Second round
3	(Paraguay) Rossana de los Ríos	7^{10}	6
(Croatia) Jelena Kostanić	6^{8}	3
(United States) Samantha Reeves	7^{9}	1	6
7	(Czech Republic) Adriana Gerši	6^{7}	6	2

Qualifying competition
3	(Paraguay) Rossana de los Ríos	4	6	6
(United States) Samantha Reeves	6	2	4

==== Fourth qualifier ====
First round
4	(Hungary) Petra Mandula	3	6^{6}
(Hungary) Zsófia Gubacsi	6	7^{8}
(Slovakia) Karina Habšudová	6	3	6
(Croatia) Maja Palaveršić-Coopersmith	4	6	1
(Czech Republic) Lenka Němečková	7^{7}	6
(Slovenia) Maja Matevžič	6^{5}	2
(Slovenia) Katarina Srebotnik	0	1
5	(Russia) Anastasia Myskina	6	6

Second round
(Hungary) Zsófia Gubacsi	7	7^{8}
(Slovakia) Karina Habšudová	5	6^{6}
(Czech Republic) Lenka Němečková	4	2
5	(Russia) Anastasia Myskina	6	6

Qualifying competition
(Hungary) Zsófia Gubacsi	3	6	2
5	(Russia) Anastasia Myskina	6	3	6
