= 1999 Generali Ladies Linz =

- Date: 25–31 October
- Edition: 13th
- Category: Tier II
- Draw: 28S / 16D
- Prize money: $520,000
- Surface: Hard / indoor
- Location: Linz, Austria

Champions

Singles
- (France) Mary Pierce

Doubles
- (Romania) Irina Spîrlea / (Netherlands) Caroline Vis
← 1998 ·	Linz Open	· 2000 →

The 1999 Generali Ladies Linz was a women's tennis tournament played on indoor hard courts in Linz, Austria. It was part of Tier II of the 1999 WTA Tour. It was the 13th edition of the tournament and was held from 25 October until 31 October 1999. First-seeded Mary Pierce won the singles title.

== Finals ==
=== Singles ===
(France) Mary Pierce defeated (France) Sandrine Testud, 7–6^{(7–2)}, 6–1

- It was Pierce's only WTA singles title of the year and the 13th of her career.

=== Doubles ===
(Romania) Irina Spîrlea / (Netherlands) Caroline Vis defeated (Slovenia) Tina Križan / (Latvia) Larisa Neiland, 6–4, 6–3

- It was Spîrlea's 3rd and last WTA doubles title of the year and the 6th and last of her career.
- It was Vis's 3rd and last WTA doubles title of the year and the 7th of her career.

== Entrants ==
=== Seeds ===
Country	Player	Rank	Seed
FRA	Mary Pierce	6	1
AUT	Barbara Schett	8	2
FRA	Nathalie Tauziat	7	3
FRA	Amélie Mauresmo	12	4
FRA	Sandrine Testud	19	5
RUS	Anna Kournikova	13	6
RUS	Elena Likhovtseva	15	7
GER	Anke Huber	17	8

=== Other entrants ===
The following players received wildcards into the singles main draw:

- (Austria) Barbara Schwartz
- (Austria) Patricia Wartusch

The following players received wildcards into the doubles main draw:

- (Austria) Sylvia Plischke / (Austria) Patricia Wartusch

The following players received entry from the singles qualifying draw:

- (Germany) Barbara Rittner
- (Czech Republic) Sandra Kleinová
- (Netherlands) Amanda Hopmans
- (Czech Republic) Denisa Chládková

The following players received entry as lucky losers:

- (Zimbabwe) Cara Black

The following players received entry from the doubles qualifying draw:

- (Netherlands) Amanda Hopmans / (Croatia) Silvija Talaja
