= 2000 Generali Ladies Linz – Singles =

Singles
- 2000 Generali Ladies Linz

Final
- Champion: (United States) Lindsay Davenport
- Runner-up: (United States) Venus Williams
- Score: 6–4, 3–6, 6–2

Details
- Draw: 28
- Seeds: 8

Events
Singles	Doubles
← 1999 ·	Linz Open	· 2001 →

Mary Pierce was the defending champion, but she did not compete this year due to injury.

Lindsay Davenport won the title, defeating Venus Williams in the final, 6–4, 3–6, 6–2. With the win, Davenport ended Williams' 35-match winning streak, extending from the Wimbledon Championships earlier in the year.

== Seeds ==
The top four seeds who played received a bye into the second round.

1. (United States) Lindsay Davenport (champion)
2. (United States) Venus Williams (final)
3. (United States) Monica Seles (withdrew)
4. (France) Nathalie Tauziat (Quarterfinal)
5. (United States) Chanda Rubin (semifinals)
6. (France) Amélie Mauresmo (second round)
7. (Russia) Elena Dementieva (first round)
8. (Croatia) Silvija Talaja (first round)
9. (Switzerland) Patty Schnyder (first round)

== Draw ==
Key

- Q = Qualifier
- WC = Wild card
- LL = Lucky loser
- Alt = Alternate
- ITF = ITF entry
- PR = Protected ranking
- SR = Special ranking
- SE = Special exempt
- JE = Junior exempt
- JR = Junior Accelerator Programme entrant
- CO = College Accelerator Programme entrant
- NG = Next Gen Accelerator Program entrant
- w/o = Walkover
- r = Retired
- d = Defaulted

=== Finals ===
Semifinals
1	(United States) Lindsay Davenport	6	6
(Czech Republic) Květa Hrdličková	1	1
5	(United States) Chanda Rubin	4	0
2	(United States) Venus Williams	6	6

Finals
1	(United States) Lindsay Davenport	6	3	6
2	(United States) Venus Williams	4	6	2

=== Top half ===
First round
(Luxembourg) A Kremer	1	1
Q	(Netherlands) A Hopmans	6	6
WC	(Austria) S Plischke	5	1
(Austria) B Schett	7	6
Q	(Czech Republic) D Chládková	7^{7}	6
8	(Croatia) S Talaja	6^{2}	2
Q	(Slovakia) K Habšudová	7^{7}	6
(France) A-G Sidot	6^{1}	1
(Czech Republic) K Hrdličková	6	7^{7}
LL	(Italy) S Farina Elia	3	6^{2}
LL	(Russia) T Panova	7^{8}	5	0^{r}
6	(France) A Mauresmo	6^{6}	7	3

Second round
1	(United States) L Davenport	6	6
Q	(Netherlands) A Hopmans	1	1
(Austria) B Schett	6	4	6
Q	(Czech Republic) D Chládková	3	6	3
4	(France) N Tauziat	6	7
Q	(Slovakia) K Habšudová	2	5
(Czech Republic) K Hrdličková	2	6	6
6	(France) A Mauresmo	6	4	4

Quarterfinals
1	(United States) L Davenport	6	4
(Austria) B Schett	2	1^{r}
4	(France) N Tauziat	3	4
(Czech Republic) K Hrdličková	6	6

Semifinals
1	(United States) L Davenport	6	6
(Czech Republic) K Hrdličková	1	1

=== Bottom half ===
First round
7	(Russia) E Dementieva	5	3
(Zimbabwe) C Black	7	6
Q	(Slovakia) H Nagyová	6^{5}	6	6
(Romania) R Dragomir	7^{7}	3	4
WC	(Austria) P Wartusch	6^{5}	6	2
(Belgium) S Appelmans	7^{7}	4	6
9	(Switzerland) P Schnyder	5	5
(Argentina) P Suárez	7	7
(Russia) E Likhovtseva	6	6
WC	(Croatia) I Majoli	4	1
(Japan) A Sugiyama	7^{7}	6
(Spain) M Serna	6^{4}	3

Second round
(Zimbabwe) C Black
Q	(Slovakia) H Nagyová	w/o
(Belgium) S Appelmans	5	4
5	(United States) C Rubin	7	6
(Argentina) P Suárez	4	0
(Russia) E Likhovtseva	6	6
(Japan) A Sugiyama	5	2
2	(United States) V Williams	7	6

Quarterfinals
Q	(Slovakia) H Nagyová	4	4
5	(United States) C Rubin	6	6
(Russia) E Likhovtseva	3	2
2	(United States) V Williams	6	6

Semifinals
5	(United States) C Rubin	4	0
2	(United States) V Williams	6	6

== Qualifying ==
=== Seeds ===
1. (Russia) Tatiana Panova (qualifying competition, lucky loser)
2. (Sweden) Åsa Carlsson (withdrew)
3. (Czech Republic) Denisa Chládková (qualified)
4. (Canada) Sonya Jeyaseelan (second round)
5. (Italy) Silvia Farina Elia (qualifying competition, lucky loser)
6. (Czech Republic) Adriana Gerši (first round)
7. (Netherlands) Kristie Boogert (second round)
8. (Slovakia) Henrieta Nagyová (qualified)

=== Qualifiers ===
1. (Slovakia) Henrieta Nagyová
2. (Czech Republic) Denisa Chládková
3. (Slovakia) Karina Habšudová
4. (Netherlands) Amanda Hopmans

=== Lucky losers ===
1. (Italy) Silvia Farina Elia
2. (Russia) Tatiana Panova

=== Draw ===
==== First qualifier ====
First round
1	(Russia) Tatiana Panova	6	6
(Slovakia) Martina Suchá	3	3
(Germany) Angelika Bachmann	7^{7}	4	6
(Italy) Flora Perfetti	6^{3}	6	2
(Czech Republic) Eva Krejčová	6	1	6
(Czech Republic) Radka Bobková	2	6	3
(Czech Republic) Jana Hlaváčková	1	1
8	(Slovakia) Henrieta Nagyová	6	6

Second round
1	(Russia) Tatiana Panova	6	7^{7}
(Germany) Angelika Bachmann	3	6^{3}
(Czech Republic) Eva Krejčová
8	(Slovakia) Henrieta Nagyová	w/o

Qualifying competition
1	(Russia) Tatiana Panova	1	0
8	(Slovakia) Henrieta Nagyová	6	6

==== Second qualifier ====
First round
3	(Czech Republic) Denisa Chládková	6	6
(Bulgaria) Antoaneta Pandjerova	1	3
(Federal Republic of Yugoslavia) Sandra Načuk	6	7
WC	(Austria) Jenny Zika	4	5
(Croatia) Jelena Kostanić	6	3	6
(Poland) Anna Bieleń	4	6	4
(Germany) Gréta Arn	6	6^{6}	3
5	(Italy) Silvia Farina Elia	4	7^{8}	6

Second round
3	(Czech Republic) Denisa Chládková	6	6
(Federal Republic of Yugoslavia) Sandra Načuk	4	0
(Poland) Anna Bieleń	0	1
5	(Italy) Silvia Farina Elia	6	6

Qualifying competition
3	(Czech Republic) Denisa Chládková	6	2	6
5	(Italy) Silvia Farina Elia	3	6	4

==== Third qualifier ====
First round
6	(Czech Republic) Adriana Gerši	3	1
(Netherlands) Miriam Oremans	6	6
WC	(Austria) Sybille Bammer	2	5
(Czech Republic) Sandra Kleinová	6	7
(Slovakia) Karina Habšudová	1	7^{7}	6
(Slovenia) Maja Matevžič	6	6^{3}	4
WC	(Austria) Daniela Kix	6	2	1
4	(Canada) Sonya Jeyaseelan	3	6	6

Second round
(Netherlands) Miriam Oremans	3	3
(Czech Republic) Sandra Kleinová	6	6
(Slovakia) Karina Habšudová	7^{7}	3	6
4	(Canada) Sonya Jeyaseelan	6^{3}	6	1

Qualifying competition
(Czech Republic) Sandra Kleinová	3	6	2
(Slovakia) Karina Habšudová	6	3	6

==== Fourth qualifier ====
First round
7	(Netherlands) Kristie Boogert	6	6
WC	(Austria) Tina Schiechtl	1	4
(Netherlands) Amanda Hopmans	6	6
(Austria) Evelyn Fauth	4	4
(France) Émilie Loit	7^{7}	6
(Slovenia) Tina Pisnik	6^{5}	3
Alt	(Czech Republic) Radka Pelikánová	6	3	4
Alt	(Croatia) Maja Palaveršić-Coopersmith	2	6	6

Second round
7	(Netherlands) Kristie Boogert	6^{5}	4
(Netherlands) Amanda Hopmans	7^{7}	6
(France) Émilie Loit	6	7^{7}
Alt	(Croatia) Maja Palaveršić-Coopersmith	3	6^{2}

Qualifying competition
(Netherlands) Amanda Hopmans	1	6	6
(France) Émilie Loit	6	2	3
