= 2000 Generali Ladies Linz – Doubles =

Doubles
- 2000 Generali Ladies Linz

Final
- Champions: (France) Amélie Mauresmo (United States) Chanda Rubin
- Runners-up: (Japan) Ai Sugiyama (France) Nathalie Tauziat
- Score: 6–4, 6–4

Details
- Draw: 16
- Seeds: 4

Events
Singles	Doubles
← 1999 ·	Linz Open	· 2001 →

Irina Spîrlea and Caroline Vis were the defending champions, but Spîrlea did not compete this year. Vis teamed up with Barbara Schett, but withdrew before their semifinal match due to Schett's right toe infection.

Amélie Mauresmo and Chanda Rubin won the title, defeating Ai Sugiyama and Nathalie Tauziat 6–4, 6–4 in the final. This was to be Rubin's 10th and final WTA doubles title.

== Seeds ==
1. (Japan) Ai Sugiyama / (France) Nathalie Tauziat (final)
2. (Zimbabwe) Cara Black / (Russia) Elena Likhovtseva (withdrew)
3. (United States) Nicole Arendt / (Netherlands) Manon Bollegraf (semifinals)
4. (Austria) Barbara Schett / (Netherlands) Caroline Vis (semifinals, withdrew)

== Draw ==
Key

- Q = Qualifier
- WC = Wild card
- LL = Lucky loser
- Alt = Alternate
- ITF = ITF entry
- PR = Protected ranking
- SR = Special ranking
- SE = Special exempt
- JE = Junior exempt
- JR = Junior Accelerator Programme entrant
- CO = College Accelerator Programme entrant
- NG = Next Gen Accelerator Program entrant
- w/o = Walkover
- r = Retired
- d = Defaulted

=== Draw ===
First round
1	(Japan) A Sugiyama (France) N Tauziat	6	6
(Romania) R Dragomir (Argentina) L Montalvo	4	2
(France) É Loit (Switzerland) P Schnyder	6	5	7^{7}
(Slovakia) K Habšudová (Canada) S Jeyaseelan	3	7	6^{2}
4	(Austria) B Schett (Netherlands) C Vis	6	6
WC	(Austria) D Kix (Austria) J Zika	0	2
(Germany) A Bachmann (Federal Republic of Yugoslavia) S Načuk	6	6
(Czech Republic) R Bobková (Czech Republic) K Šišková	4	2
(Netherlands) K Boogert (Netherlands) M Oremans	7^{7}	6
(Netherlands) A Hopmans (Slovenia) T Pisnik	6^{5}	4
Q	(Luxembourg) A Kremer (Slovakia) H Nagyová	1	0
3	(United States) N Arendt (Netherlands) M Bollegraf	6	6
(United States) K Po (France) AG Sidot	5	3
(France) A Mauresmo (United States) C Rubin	7	6
(Austria) S Plischke (Austria) P Wartusch	6	6
LL	(Austria) S Bammer (Croatia) M Palaveršić	0	1

Quarterfinals
1	(Japan) A Sugiyama (France) N Tauziat	6	6
(France) É Loit (Switzerland) P Schnyder	4	1
4	(Austria) B Schett (Netherlands) C Vis	w/o
(Germany) A Bachmann (Federal Republic of Yugoslavia) S Načuk
(Netherlands) K Boogert (Netherlands) M Oremans	1	3
3	(United States) N Arendt (Netherlands) M Bollegraf	6	6
(France) A Mauresmo (United States) C Rubin	6	6
(Austria) S Plischke (Austria) P Wartusch	1	3

Semifinals
1	(Japan) A Sugiyama (France) N Tauziat	w/o
4	(Austria) B Schett (Netherlands) C Vis
3	(United States) N Arendt (Netherlands) M Bollegraf	5	4
(France) A Mauresmo (United States) C Rubin	7	6

Final
1	(Japan) A Sugiyama (France) N Tauziat	4	4
(France) A Mauresmo (United States) C Rubin	6	6

== Qualifying ==
=== Qualifiers ===
1. (Luxembourg) Anne Kremer / (Slovakia) Henrieta Nagyová

=== Lucky losers ===
1. (Austria) Sybille Bammer / (Croatia) Maja Palaveršić-Coopersmith

=== Draw ===
Qualifying competition
(Luxembourg) Anne Kremer (Slovakia) Henrieta Nagyová	8
(Austria) Sybille Bammer (Croatia) Maja Palaveršić-Coopersmith	6
