= 2003 Generali Ladies Linz – Singles =

Singles
- 2003 Generali Ladies Linz

Final
- Champion: (Japan) Ai Sugiyama
- Runner-up: (Russia) Nadia Petrova
- Score: 7–5, 6–4

Details
- Draw: 28
- Seeds: 8

Events
| Singles | Doubles |
| ← 2002 · | Linz Open | · 2004 → |

Justine Henin-Hardenne was the defending champion, but withdrew from the tournament due to injury.

Ai Sugiyama won the title, defeating Nadia Petrova in the final 7–5, 6–4.

== Seeds ==
The top four seeds received a bye into the second round.

1. (Russia) Anastasia Myskina (quarterfinals)
2. (Japan) Ai Sugiyama (champion)
3. (Russia) Vera Zvonareva (semifinals)
4. (Russia) Nadia Petrova (final)
5. (Slovakia) Daniela Hantuchová (first round)
6. (Israel) Anna Pistolesi (quarterfinals)
7. (Argentina) Paola Suárez (quarterfinals)
8. (Switzerland) Patty Schnyder (semifinals)

== Draw ==
=== Key ===
- Q = Qualifier
- WC = Wild card
- LL = Lucky loser
- Alt = Alternate
- SE = Special exempt
- PR = Protected ranking
- ITF = ITF entry
- JE = Junior exempt
- w/o = Walkover
- r = Retired
- d = Defaulted
- SR = Special ranking

=== Finals ===
Semifinals
8 | (Switzerland) Patty Schnyder | 5 | 4
4 | (Russia) Nadia Petrova | 7 | 6
3 | (Russia) Vera Zvonareva | 3 | 6 | 4
2 | (Japan) Ai Sugiyama | 6 | 3 | 6

Finals
4 | (Russia) Nadia Petrova | 5 | 4
2 | (Japan) Ai Sugiyama | 7 | 6

=== Top half ===
First round
(Italy) F Schiavone | 6^{7} | 4
(Russia) E Bovina | 7^{9} | 6
(Czech Republic) D Chládková | 6 | 5 | 6
Q | (Slovakia) Ľ Cervanová | 3 | 7 | 0
(Switzerland) M-G Mikaelian | 6^{5} | 5
8 | (Switzerland) P Schnyder | 7^{7} | 7
(Russia) L Krasnoroutskaya | 6 | 7^{7}
(Italy) S Farina Elia | 3 | 6^{5}
(Spain) M Serna | 6 | 7
(Russia) E Likhovtseva | 4 | 5
WC | (Croatia) K Šprem | 3 | 4
7 | (Argentina) P Suárez | 6 | 6

Second round
1 | (Russia) A Myskina | 6 | 3 | 6
(Russia) E Bovina | 3 | 6 | 2
(Czech Republic) D Chládková | 3 | 4
8 | (Switzerland) P Schnyder | 6 | 6
4 | (Russia) N Petrova | 4 | 6 | 6
(Russia) L Krasnoroutskaya | 6 | 2 | 1
(Spain) M Serna | 5 | 3
7 | (Argentina) P Suárez | 7 | 6

Quarterfinals
1 | (Russia) A Myskina | 1 | 1
8 | (Switzerland) P Schnyder | 6 | 6
4 | (Russia) N Petrova | 4 | 6 | 6
7 | (Argentina) P Suárez | 6 | 4 | 3

Semifinals
8 | (Switzerland) P Schnyder | 2 | 2
4 | (Russia) N Petrova | 6 | 6

=== Bottom half ===
First round
6 | (Israel) A Pistolesi | 6 | 2 | 6
WC | (Austria) S Bammer | 4 | 6 | 2
Q | (Czech Republic) K Koukalová | 1 | 6 | 4
Q | (Slovenia) M Matevžič | 6 | 1 | 6
Q | (Canada) S Jeyaseelan | 4 | 6 | 6^{4}
(France) M Bartoli | 6 | 4 | 7^{7}
5 | (Slovakia) D Hantuchová | 4 | 1
(Serbia and Montenegro) J Dokic | 6 | 6
(Hungary) P Mandula | 6 | 6
WC | (Austria) B Schett | 3 | 3
(Slovenia) T Pisnik | 6 | 6
(United States) A Stevenson | 2 | 3

Second round
6 | (Israel) A Pistolesi | 6 | 6
Q | (Slovenia) M Matevžič | 3 | 4
(France) M Bartoli | 2 | 3
3 | (Russia) V Zvonareva | 6 | 6
(Serbia and Montenegro) J Dokic | 6 | 3 | 6
(Hungary) P Mandula | 3 | 6 | 3
(Slovenia) T Pisnik | 3 | 5
2 | (Japan) A Sugiyama | 6 | 7

Quarterfinals
6 | (Israel) A Pistolesi | 2 | 6 | 5
3 | (Russia) V Zvonareva | 6 | 3 | 7
(Serbia and Montenegro) J Dokic | 4 | 7^{7} | 3
2 | (Japan) A Sugiyama | 6 | 6^{4} | 6

Semifinals
3 | (Russia) V Zvonareva | 3 | 6 | 4
2 | (Japan) A Sugiyama | 6 | 3 | 6

== Qualifying ==
=== Seeds ===
1. (Slovenia) Maja Matevžič (qualified)
2. (Slovakia) Ľudmila Cervanová (qualified)
3. (Czech Republic) Klára Koukalová (qualified)
4. (Croatia) Jelena Kostanić Tošić (second round)
5. (Ukraine) Tatiana Perebiynis (second round)
6. (Czech Republic) Zuzana Ondrášková (second round)
7. (Czech Republic) Sandra Kleinová (first round)
8. (Croatia) Silvija Talaja (qualifying competition)

=== Qualifiers ===
1. (Slovenia) Maja Matevžič
2. (Slovakia) Ľudmila Cervanová
3. (Czech Republic) Klára Koukalová
4. (Canada) Sonya Jeyaseelan

=== Draw ===
==== First qualifier ====
First round
1/WC | (Slovenia) Maja Matevžič | 6 | 3 | 6
(Austria) Nicole Remis | 3 | 6 | 1
(Croatia) Ivana Abramović | 1 | 0
(Ukraine) Yuliya Beygelzimer | 6 | 6
(Germany) Anna-Lena Grönefeld | 6 | 6
Alt | (Germany) Adriana Jerabek | 0 | 3
WC | (Austria) Verena Amesbauer | 0 | 2
5 | (Ukraine) Tatiana Perebiynis | 6 | 6

Second round
1/WC | (Slovenia) Maja Matevžič | 6 | 6
(Ukraine) Yuliya Beygelzimer | 1 | 2
(Germany) Anna-Lena Grönefeld | 6 | 6
5 | (Ukraine) Tatiana Perebiynis | 3 | 3

Qualifying competition
1/WC | (Slovenia) Maja Matevžič | 6 | 6
(Germany) Anna-Lena Grönefeld | 1 | 4

==== Second qualifier ====
First round
2 | (Slovakia) Ľudmila Cervanová | 6 | 6
(Austria) Tina Schiechtl | 4 | 3
Alt | (Serbia and Montenegro) Karolina Jovanović | 2 | 5
WC | (Austria) Susanne Aigner | 6 | 7
(Czech Republic) Iveta Melzer | 7^{7} | 6
(Israel) Tzipora Obziler | 6^{3} | 4
(Germany) Caroline Schneider | 1 | 1
8 | (Croatia) Silvija Talaja | 6 | 6

Second round
2 | (Slovakia) Ľudmila Cervanová | 6 | 6
WC | (Austria) Susanne Aigner | 0 | 1
(Czech Republic) Iveta Melzer | 5 | 2
8 | (Croatia) Silvija Talaja | 7 | 6

Qualifying competition
2 | (Slovakia) Ľudmila Cervanová | 6 | 2 | 6
8 | (Croatia) Silvija Talaja | 4 | 6 | 4

==== Third qualifier ====
First round
3 | (Czech Republic) Klára Koukalová | 6 | 6
WC | (Austria) Marion Walter | 2 | 4
(Czech Republic) Lenka Němečková | 1 | 6^{5}
WC | (Austria) Daniela Kix | 6 | 7^{7}
(United States) Jill Craybas | 7^{7} | 1 | 6
(Switzerland) Myriam Casanova | 6^{5} | 6 | 3
(Czech Republic) Michaela Paštiková | 6 | 6
7 | (Czech Republic) Sandra Kleinová | 4 | 3

Second round
3 | (Czech Republic) Klára Koukalová | 3 | 6 | 6
WC | (Austria) Daniela Kix | 6 | 3 | 3
(United States) Jill Craybas | 1 | 2
(Czech Republic) Michaela Paštiková | 6 | 6

Qualifying competition
3 | (Czech Republic) Klára Koukalová | 7^{7} | 6
(Czech Republic) Michaela Paštiková | 6^{0} | 3

==== Fourth qualifier ====
First round
4 | (Croatia) Jelena Kostanić Tošić | 3 | 6 | 6
(Austria) Yvonne Meusburger | 6 | 2 | 0
(France) Caroline Dhenin | 3 | 6 | 2
(Slovakia) Eva Fislová | 6 | 4 | 6
(Canada) Sonya Jeyaseelan | 6 | 6
(Austria) Stefanie Haidner | 2 | 4
WC | (Austria) Patricia Mayr-Achleitner | 0 | 1
6 | (Czech Republic) Zuzana Ondrášková | 6 | 6

Second round
4 | (Croatia) Jelena Kostanić Tošić | 6 | 2 | 4
(Slovakia) Eva Fislová | 3 | 6 | 6
(Canada) Sonya Jeyaseelan | 7 | 6
6 | (Czech Republic) Zuzana Ondrášková | 5 | 1

Qualifying competition
(Slovakia) Eva Fislová | 2 | 4
(Canada) Sonya Jeyaseelan | 6 | 6
