= 2003 Generali Ladies Linz – Doubles =

Doubles
- 2003 Generali Ladies Linz

Final
- Champions: (South Africa) Liezel Huber (Japan) Ai Sugiyama
- Runners-up: (France) Marion Bartoli (Italy) Silvia Farina Elia
- Score: 6–1, 7–6^{(8–6)}

Events
Singles	Doubles
← 2002 ·	Linz Open	· 2004 →

Jelena Dokic and Nadia Petrova were the two-time defending champions, but Dokic did not participate in the doubles event at this tournament. Petrova partnered Elena Likhovtseva, but the pair withdrew before their semifinal match against Marion Bartoli and Silvia Farina Elia.

Liezel Huber and Ai Sugiyama won the title, defeating Bartoli and Farina Elia in the final 6–1, 7–6^{(8–6)}.

== Seeds ==
1. (South Africa) Liezel Huber / (Japan) Ai Sugiyama (champions)
2. (Russia) Elena Likhovtseva / (Russia) Nadia Petrova (semifinals)
3. (Slovakia) Daniela Hantuchová / (Spain) Magüi Serna (quarterfinals)
4. (Austria) Barbara Schett / (Switzerland) Patty Schnyder (first round)

== Draw ==
=== Key ===
- Q = Qualifier
- WC = Wild card
- LL = Lucky loser
- Alt = Alternate
- SE = Special exempt
- PR = Protected ranking
- ITF = ITF entry
- JE = Junior exempt
- w/o = Walkover
- r = Retired
- d = Defaulted
- SR = Special ranking

=== Draw ===
First round
1	(South Africa) L Huber (Japan) A Sugiyama	6	6
(Slovakia) Ľ Cervanová (Slovakia) E Fislová	2	1
(Russia) A Myskina (Russia) V Zvonareva	6	6
WC	(Austria) V Amesbauer (Austria) D Kix	1	1
3	(Slovakia) D Hantuchová (Spain) M Serna	6	3	6
(Canada) S Jeyaseelan (Slovenia) M Matevžič	4	6	1
(France) C Dhenin (Germany) B Lamade	3	6	5
(Czech Republic) I Melzer (Czech Republic) M Paštiková	6	2	7
(Austria) S Haidner (Germany) A Jerabek	7^{7}	6
(Austria) D Klemenschits (Austria) S Klemenschits	6^{5}	4
(France) M Bartoli (Italy) S Farina Elia	5	6	6
4	(Austria) B Schett (Switzerland) P Schnyder	7	3	0
(Ukraine) Y Beygelzimer (Croatia) J Kostanić Tošić	6	6
(Ukraine) T Perebiynis (Croatia) S Talaja	4	0
(United States) J Craybas (Germany) C Schneider	1	1
2	(Russia) E Likhovtseva (Russia) N Petrova	6	6

Quarterfinals
1	(South Africa) L Huber (Japan) A Sugiyama	6	6
(Russia) A Myskina (Russia) A Zvonareva	3	1
3	(Slovakia) D Hantuchová (Spain) M Serna	2	6	5
(Czech Republic) I Melzer (Czech Republic) M Paštiková	6	4	7
(Austria) S Haidner (Germany) A Jerabek	2	2
(France) M Bartoli (Italy) S Farina Elia	6	6
(Ukraine) Y Beygelzimer (Croatia) J Kostanić Tošić	4	4
2	(Russia) E Likhovtseva (Russia) N Petrova	6	6

Semifinals
1	(South Africa) L Huber (Japan) A Sugiyama	4	6	6
(Czech Republic) I Melzer (Czech Republic) M Paštiková	6	4	2
(France) M Bartoli (Italy) S Farina Elia	w/o
2	(Russia) E Likhovtseva (Russia) N Petrova

Final
1	(South Africa) L Huber (Japan) A Sugiyama	6	7^{8}
(France) M Bartoli (Italy) S Farina Elia	1	6^{6}
