= 1998 EA-Generali Ladies Linz – Singles =

Singles
- 1998 EA-Generali Ladies Linz

Final
- Champion: (Czech Republic) Jana Novotná
- Runner-up: (Belgium) Dominique Van Roost
- Score: 6–1, 7–6^{(7–2)}

Details
- Draw: 28
- Seeds: 8

Events
Singles	Doubles
← 1997 ·	Linz Open	· 1999 →

Chanda Rubin was the defending champion, but chose not compete that year.

Jana Novotná won the title, defeating Dominique Van Roost in the final, 6–1, 7–6^{(7–2)}.

== Seeds ==
A champion seed is indicated in bold text while text in italics indicates the round in which that seed was eliminated. The top four seeds received a bye to the second round.

1. (Czech Republic) **Jana Novotná (champion)**
2. (Croatia) Iva Majoli (semifinals)
3. (France) Nathalie Tauziat (quarterfinals)
4. (Belgium) Dominique Van Roost (final)
5. (United States) Lisa Raymond (quarterfinals)
6. (Indonesia) Yayuk Basuki (first round)
7. (Belgium) Sabine Appelmans (semifinals)
8. (Russia) Anna Kournikova (quarterfinals)

== Draw ==
=== Key ===
- Q = Qualifier
- WC = Wild card
- LL = Lucky loser
- Alt = Alternate
- ITF = ITF entry
- PR = Protected ranking
- SR = Special ranking
- SE = Special exempt
- JE = Junior exempt
- JR = Junior Accelerator Programme entrant
- CO = College Accelerator Programme entrant
- NG = Next Gen Accelerator Program entrant
- w/o = Walkover
- r = Retired
- d = Defaulted

=== Finals ===
Semifinals
1	**(Czech Republic) Jana Novotná**	**6**	**6**
(Italy) Silvia Farina	4	1
4	**(Belgium) Dominique Van Roost**	**6**	0
2	(Croatia) Iva Majoli	2	0^{r}

Finals
1	**(Czech Republic) Jana Novotná**	**6**	**7^{7}**
4	(Belgium) Dominique Van Roost	1	6^{2}

=== Section 1 ===
First round
(Sweden) Å Carlsson	0	6^{8}
Q	(France) **A Mauresmo**	**6**	**7^{10}**
Q	(France) N Dechy	3	3
(Germany) **B Rittner**	**6**	**6**
WC	(Austria) S Plischke	**7**	4	5
8	(Russia) **A Kournikova**	5	**6**	**7**
(France) **A Fusai**	**7**	**7**
(Czech Republic) D Chládková	5	5
(Slovakia) K Studeníková	3	**6**	3
Q	(Austria) **K Kschwendt**	**6**	2	**6**
(Italy) **S Farina**	**6**	**6**
6	(Indonesia) Y Basuki	3	4

Second round
1	(Czech Republic) **J Novotná**	**6**	**6**
Q	(France) A Mauresmo	4	2
(Germany) B Rittner	3	4
8	(Russia) **A Kournikova**	**6**	**6**
3	(France) **N Tauziat**	4	**6**	**6**
(France) A Fusai	**6**	2	2
Q	(Austria) K Kschwendt	5	4
(Italy) **S Farina**	**7**	**6**

Quarterfinals
1	(Czech Republic) **J Novotná**	**6**	**6**
8	(Russia) A Kournikova	1	3
3	(France) N Tauziat	4	6^{0}
(Italy) **S Farina**	**6**	**7^{7}**

Semifinals
1	(Czech Republic) **J Novotná**	**6**	**6**
(Italy) S Farina	4	1

=== Section 2 ===
First round
7	(Belgium) **S Appelmans**	**6**	**6**
(Czech Republic) S Kleinová	4	2
(Argentina) **F Labat**	**7**	**6**
WC	(Austria) M Maruska	5	0
(Slovakia) K Habšudová	6^{1}	0^{r}
(Czech Republic) **A Gerši**	**7^{7}**	0
5	(United States) **L Raymond**	**6**	**6**
(Spain) M Sánchez Lorenzo	2	3
(France) A-G Sidot	6^{10}	**7^{7}**	3
(Netherlands) **M Oremans**	**7^{12}**	6^{4}	**6**
(Bulgaria) **M Maleeva**	**6**	**6**
Q	(Germany) A Glass	1	0

Second round
7	(Belgium) **S Appelmans**	**6**	**6**
(Argentina) F Labat	2	1
(Czech Republic) A Gerši	**6**	5	6^{7}
4	(Belgium) **D Van Roost**	2	**7**	**7^{9}**
5	(United States) **L Raymond**	**7^{7}**	**7^{7}**
(Netherlands) M Oremans	6^{5}	6^{3}
(Bulgaria) M Maleeva	1	1
2	(Croatia) **I Majoli**	**6**	**6**

Quarterfinals
7	(Belgium) S Appelmans	3	5
4	(Belgium) **D Van Roost**	**6**	**7**
5	(United States) L Raymond	6^{3}	**6**	3
2	(Croatia) **I Majoli**	**7^{7}**	4	**6**

Semifinals
4	(Belgium) **D Van Roost**	**6**	0
2	(Croatia) I Majoli	2	0^{r}
