= 2004 Generali Ladies Linz – Singles =

Singles
- 2004 Generali Ladies Linz

Final
- Champion: (France) Amélie Mauresmo
- Runner-up: (Russia) Elena Bovina
- Score: 6–2, 6–0

Details
- Draw: 28
- Seeds: 8

Events
Singles	Doubles
← 2003 ·	Linz Open	· 2005 →

Ai Sugiyama was the defending champion, but lost in the quarterfinals to Amélie Mauresmo.

Mauresmo went on to win the title, defeating Elena Bovina in the final 6–2, 6–0. This was Bovina's final WTA tour final.

== Seeds ==
The top four seeds who played received a bye into the second round.

1. (France) Amélie Mauresmo (champion)
2. (Russia) Anastasia Myskina (withdrew)
3. (United States) Serena Williams (second round)
4. (Russia) Vera Zvonareva (quarterfinals)
5. (Russia) Nadia Petrova (semifinals)
6. (Japan) Ai Sugiyama (quarterfinals)
7. (Switzerland) Patty Schnyder (first round)
8. (Croatia) Karolina Šprem (first round)
9. (Russia) Elena Bovina (final)

== Draw ==
=== Key ===
- Q = Qualifier
- WC = Wild card
- LL = Lucky loser
- Alt = Alternate
- ITF = ITF entry
- PR = Protected ranking
- SR = Special ranking
- SE = Special exempt
- JE = Junior exempt
- JR = Junior Accelerator Programme entrant
- CO = College Accelerator Programme entrant
- NG = Next Gen Accelerator Program entrant
- w/o = Walkover
- r = Retired
- d = Defaulted

=== Finals ===
Semifinals
1/WC	(France) Amélie Mauresmo	4	6	6
(Serbia and Montenegro) Jelena Janković	6	3	1
5	(Russia) Nadia Petrova	3	6	6^{3}
9	(Russia) Elena Bovina	6	4	7^{7}

Finals
1/WC	(France) Amélie Mauresmo	6	6
9	(Russia) Elena Bovina	2	0

=== Top half ===
First round
(Colombia) F Zuluaga	1	7^{7}	4
LL	(Poland) M Domachowska	6	6^{5}	6
LL	(United States) L Lee-Waters	6	3	2
(Slovakia) D Hantuchová	2	6	6
(Venezuela) M Vento-Kabchi	0	0
6	(Japan) A Sugiyama	6	6
(France) N Dechy	3	6	6
(Czech Republic) I Benešová	6	3	1
Q	(Slovakia) M Suchá	4	4
WC	(Austria) B Schett	6	6
(Serbia and Montenegro) J Janković	6	6
7	(Switzerland) P Schnyder	2	2

Second round
1/WC	(France) A Mauresmo	6	6
LL	(Poland) M Domachowska	4	0
(Slovakia) D Hantuchová	2	1
6	(Japan) A Sugiyama	6	6
4	(Russia) V Zvonareva	7^{7}	6
(France) N Dechy	6^{5}	4
WC	(Austria) B Schett	3	1
(Serbia and Montenegro) J Janković	6	6

Quarterfinals
1/WC	(France) A Mauresmo	6	6
6	(Japan) A Sugiyama	2	4
4	(Russia) V Zvonareva	4	4
(Serbia and Montenegro) J Janković	6	6

Semifinals
1/WC	(France) A Mauresmo	4	6	6
(Serbia and Montenegro) J Janković	6	3	1

=== Bottom half ===
First round
8	(Croatia) K Šprem	5	6	1
(United States) M Shaughnessy	7	4	6
Q	(Germany) J Schruff	6	6
(Czech Republic) K Koukalová	4	3
(Russia) E Likhovtseva	6	6
WC	(Austria) S Bammer	3	1
9	(Russia) E Bovina	6	6
(Croatia) J Kostanić	4	2
(France) M Bartoli	7	6
(Russia) T Panova	5	1
Q	(Russia) A Jidkova	6	6
Q	(Russia) V Dushevina	2	1

Second round
(United States) M Shaughnessy	7	6
Q	(Germany) J Schruff	5	2
(Russia) E Likhovtseva	2	7	3
5	(Russia) N Petrova	6	5	6
(Russia) E Bovina	6	6
(France) M Bartoli	3	1
Q	(Russia) A Jidkova	7^{7}	6
3	(United States) S Williams	6^{5}	2

Quarterfinals
(United States) M Shaughnessy	6	3	2
5	(Russia) N Petrova	3	6	6
(Russia) E Bovina	6^{3}	6	3
Q	(Russia) A Jidkova	7^{7}	2	0^{r}

Semifinals
5	(Russia) N Petrova	3	6	6^{3}
(Russia) E Bovina	6	4	7^{7}

== Qualifying ==
=== Seeds ===
1. (Czech Republic) Denisa Chládková (first round)
2. (Czech Republic) Barbora Strýcová (withdrew)
3. (Russia) Vera Dushevina (qualified)
4. (Russia) Alina Jidkova (qualified)
5. (Slovakia) Martina Suchá (qualified)
6. (Slovakia) Ľubomíra Kurhajcová (first round)
7. (Poland) Marta Domachowska (qualifying competition, lucky loser)
8. (United States) Lindsay Lee-Waters (qualifying competition, lucky loser)

=== Qualifiers ===
1. (Slovakia) Martina Suchá
2. (Germany) Julia Schruff
3. (Russia) Vera Dushevina
4. (Russia) Alina Jidkova

=== Lucky losers ===
1. (Poland) Marta Domachowska
2. (United States) Lindsay Lee-Waters

=== Draw ===
==== First qualifier ====
First round
1	(Czech Republic) Denisa Chládková	3	4
(Slovakia) Ľudmila Cervanová	6	6
WC	(Austria) Daniela Kix	3	5
(Austria) Yvonne Meusburger	6	7
WC	(Austria) Patricia Wartusch	6	3	5
(Croatia) Silvija Talaja	4	6	7
(Czech Republic) Eva Birnerová	5	1
5	(Slovakia) Martina Suchá	7	6

Second round
(Slovakia) Ľudmila Cervanová	6	7^{7}
(Austria) Yvonne Meusburger	2	6^{3}
(Croatia) Silvija Talaja	2	6^{3}
5	(Slovakia) Martina Suchá	6	7^{7}

Qualifying competition
(Slovakia) Ľudmila Cervanová	6	6^{6}	2
5	(Slovakia) Martina Suchá	2	7^{8}	6

==== Second qualifier ====
First round
(Germany) Angelika Rösch	4	0
(France) Camille Pin	6	6
(Ukraine) Yuliana Fedak	6	6
(Sweden) Åsa Svensson	1	3
(Russia) Evgenia Linetskaya	6	6
(Czech Republic) Lenka Němečková	2	3
(Germany) Julia Schruff	6^{0}	7	7^{9}
6	(Slovakia) Ľubomíra Kurhajcová	7^{7}	5	6^{7}

Second round
(France) Camille Pin	6	3	4
(Ukraine) Yuliana Fedak	4	6	6
(Russia) Evgenia Linetskaya	5	6	3
(Germany) Julia Schruff	7	3	6

Qualifying competition
(Ukraine) Yuliana Fedak	3	6	2
(Germany) Julia Schruff	6	4	6

==== Third qualifier ====
First round
3	(Russia) Vera Dushevina	7	6
(Switzerland) Marie-Gaïané Mikaelian	5	3
(Czech Republic) Michaela Paštiková	7^{8}	2
(Ukraine) Tatiana Perebiynis	6^{6}	0^{r}
(Croatia) Sanda Mamić	1^{r}
(Slovakia) Stanislava Hrozenská	2
(Slovenia) Katarina Srebotnik	2	4
7	(Poland) Marta Domachowska	6	6

Second round
3	(Russia) Vera Dushevina	6	6
(Czech Republic) Michaela Paštiková	4	2
(Slovakia) Stanislava Hrozenská	3	6^{2}
7	(Poland) Marta Domachowska	6	7^{7}

Qualifying competition
3	(Russia) Vera Dushevina	6	6
7	(Poland) Marta Domachowska	4	2

==== Fourth qualifier ====
First round
4	(Russia) Alina Jidkova	6	6
(Germany) Adriana Barna	1	2
WC	(Austria) Stefanie Haidner	2	3
(Switzerland) Emmanuelle Gagliardi	6	6
(Spain) Magüi Serna	6	6
WC	(Austria) Melanie Klaffner	0	1
(Slovakia) Jarmila Gajdošová	4	2
8	(United States) Lindsay Lee-Waters	6	6

Second round
4	(Russia) Alina Jidkova	6	6
(Switzerland) Emmanuelle Gagliardi	3	1
(Spain) Magüi Serna	6^{5}	6	6^{7}
8	(United States) Lindsay Lee-Waters	7^{7}	3	7^{9}

Qualifying competition
4	(Russia) Alina Jidkova	7^{7}	7
8	(United States) Lindsay Lee-Waters	6^{5}	5
