= 1997 EA-Generali Ladies Linz =

- Date: 3–9 February
- Edition: 11th
- Category: Tier III
- Draw: 30S / 16D
- Prize money: $164,250
- Surface: Carpet / indoor
- Location: Intersport Arena
- Venue: Linz, Austria

Champions

Singles
- (United States) Chanda Rubin

Doubles
- (France) Alexandra Fusai / (France) Nathalie Tauziat
← 1996 ·	Linz Open	· 1998 →

The 1997 EA-Generali Ladies Linz was a women's tennis tournament played on indoor carpet courts at the Intersport Arena in Linz in Austria that was part of Tier III of the 1997 WTA Tour. The tournament was held from 3 February until 9 February 1997. Seventh-seeded Chanda Rubin won the singles title.

== Finals ==
=== Singles ===
(United States) Chanda Rubin defeated (Slovakia) Karina Habšudová 6–4, 6–2

- It was Rubin's only singles title of the year and the 1st of her career.

=== Doubles ===
(France) Alexandra Fusai / (France) Nathalie Tauziat defeated (Czech Republic) Eva Melicharová / (Czech Republic) Helena Vildová 4–6, 6–3, 6–1

- It was Fusai's 1st doubles title of the year and the 2nd of her career. It was Tauziat's 1st title of the year and the 16th of her career.
