= 1999 Generali Ladies Linz – Doubles =

Doubles
- 1999 Generali Ladies Linz

Final
- Champions: (Romania) Irina Spîrlea (Netherlands) Caroline Vis
- Runners-up: (Slovenia) Tina Križan (Latvia) Larisa Neiland
- Score: 6–4, 6–3

Details
- Draw: 16
- Seeds: 4

Events
Singles	Doubles
← 1998 ·	Linz Open	· 2000 →

The 1999 Generali Ladies Linz doubles was the tennis doubles event of the thirteenth edition of the most prestigious tournament in Austria. Alexandra Fusai and Nathalie Tauziat were the two-time defending champions, but they were defeated in the semifinals by Tina Križan and Larisa Neiland.

Irina Spîrlea and Caroline Vis won in the final, defeating Križan and Neiland in straight sets to win their third doubles tournament as a team in the year.

== Seeds ==
1. (Russia) Elena Likhovtseva / (Japan) Ai Sugiyama (semifinals)
2. (France) Alexandra Fusai / (France) Nathalie Tauziat (semifinals)
3. (Romania) Irina Spîrlea / (Netherlands) Caroline Vis (champions)
4. (Slovenia) Tina Križan / (Latvia) Larisa Neiland (final)

== Draw ==
=== Key ===
- Q = Qualifier
- WC = Wild card
- LL = Lucky loser
- Alt = Alternate
- ITF = ITF entry
- PR = Protected ranking
- SR = Special ranking
- SE = Special exempt
- JE = Junior exempt
- JR = Junior Accelerator Programme entrant
- CO = College Accelerator Programme entrant
- NG = Next Gen Accelerator Program entrant
- w/o = Walkover
- r = Retired
- d = Defaulted

First round
1	(Russia) E Likhovtseva (Japan) A Sugiyama	6	6
(Austria) B Schett (Austria) B Schwartz	4	2
(Sweden) Å Carlsson (France) É Loit	7	6
(Romania) C Cristea (Romania) R Dragomir	5	2
3	(Romania) I Spîrlea (Netherlands) C Vis	6	6
(Croatia) J Kostanić (Germany) C Schneider	4	3
Q	(Netherlands) A Hopmans (Croatia) S Talaja	6	6
(France) A Cocheteux (Hungary) K Marosi	4	2
(Germany) B Rittner (Switzerland) P Schnyder	6	6
(Zimbabwe) C Black (Australia) J Dokic	4	2
(Italy) S Farina Elia (Slovakia) K Habšudová
4	(Slovenia) T Križan (Latvia) L Neiland	w/o
(Czech Republic) L Němečková (Slovakia) R Zrubáková	2	2
(Netherlands) M Oremans (France) A-G Sidot	6	6
WC	(Austria) S Plischke (Austria) P Wartusch	4	2
2	(France) A Fusai (France) N Tauziat	6	6

Quarterfinals
1	(Russia) E Likhovtseva (Japan) A Sugiyama	4	6	7^{7}
(Sweden) Å Carlsson (France) É Loit	6	2	6^{5}
3	(Romania) I Spîrlea (Netherlands) C Vis	4	6	6
Q	(Netherlands) A Hopmans (Croatia) S Talaja	6	3	0
(Germany) B Rittner (Switzerland) P Schnyder	6^{5}	4
4	(Slovenia) T Križan (Latvia) L Neiland	7^{7}	6
(Netherlands) M Oremans (France) A-G Sidot	0	1
2	(France) A Fusai (France) N Tauziat	6	6

Semifinals
1	(Russia) E Likhovtseva (Japan) A Sugiyama	3	4
3	(Romania) I Spîrlea (Netherlands) C Vis	6	6
4	(Slovenia) T Križan (Latvia) L Neiland	4	6	6
2	(France) A Fusai (France) N Tauziat	6	2	4

Final
3	(Romania) I Spîrlea (Netherlands) C Vis	6	6
4	(Slovenia) T Križan (Latvia) L Neiland	4	3

== Qualifying ==
=== Seeds ===
1. (Bulgaria) Svetlana Krivencheva / (Federal Republic of Yugoslavia) Sandra Naćuk (first round)
2. (Netherlands) Amanda Hopmans / (Croatia) Silvija Talaja (qualified)

=== Qualifiers ===
1. (Netherlands) Amanda Hopmans / (Croatia) Silvija Talaja

== Qualifying draw ==
=== Key ===
- Q = Qualifier
- WC = Wild card
- LL = Lucky loser
- Alt = Alternate
- ITF = ITF entry
- PR = Protected ranking
- SR = Special ranking
- SE = Special exempt
- JE = Junior exempt
- JR = Junior Accelerator Programme entrant
- CO = College Accelerator Programme entrant
- NG = Next Gen Accelerator Program entrant
- w/o = Walkover
- r = Retired
- d = Defaulted

First round
1	(Bulgaria) Svetlana Krivencheva (Federal Republic of Yugoslavia) Sandra Naćuk	4
(Russia) Anastasia Myskina (France) Sarah Pitkowski	8
WC	(Austria) Evelyn Fauth (Austria) Marion Maruska	7
2	(Netherlands) Amanda Hopmans (Croatia) Silvija Talaja	9

Qualifying competition
(Russia) Anastasia Myskina (France) Sarah Pitkowski	8
2	(Netherlands) Amanda Hopmans (Croatia) Silvija Talaja	9
