= 1997 EA-Generali Ladies Linz – Doubles =

Doubles
- 1997 EA-Generali Ladies Linz
- 1996 Champions: (Netherlands) Manon Bollegraf (United States) Meredith McGrath

Final
- Champions: (France) Alexandra Fusai (France) Nathalie Tauziat
- Runners-up: (Czech Republic) Eva Melicharová (Czech Republic) Helena Vildová
- Score: 4–6, 6–3, 6–1

Details
- Draw: 16
- Seeds: 4

Events
Singles	Doubles
← 1996 ·	Linz Open	· 1998 →

Manon Bollegraf and Meredith McGrath were the defending champions, but did not compete in this event.

Alexandra Fusai and Nathalie Tauziat won in the final 4–6, 6–3, 6–1 against Eva Melicharová and Helena Vildová.

== Seeds ==
Champion seeds are indicated in bold text while text in italics indicates the round in which those seeds were eliminated.

1. (France) **Alexandra Fusai** / (France) **Nathalie Tauziat (champions)**
2. (Belgium) Sabine Appelmans / (United States) Chanda Rubin (quarterfinals)
3. (Italy) Silvia Farina / (Germany) Barbara Rittner (semifinals)
4. (Italy) Laura Golarsa / (Germany) Christina Singer (first round)

== Draw ==
=== Key ===
- Q = Qualifier
- WC = Wild card
- LL = Lucky loser
- Alt = Alternate
- ITF = ITF entry
- PR = Protected ranking
- SR = Special ranking
- SE = Special exempt
- JE = Junior exempt
- JR = Junior Accelerator Programme entrant
- CO = College Accelerator Programme entrant
- NG = Next Gen Accelerator Program entrant
- w/o = Walkover
- r = Retired
- d = Defaulted

First round
1	(France) **A Fusai** (France) **N Tauziat**	**6**	**7**
(Hungary) V Csurgo (Germany) C Schneider	1	5
(France) **A-G Sidot** (Sweden) **M Strandlund**	**6**	**6**
(Slovakia) K Habšudová (Slovakia) R Zrubáková	1	2
3	(Italy) **S Farina** (Germany) **B Rittner**	4	**6**	**6**
(Argentina) F Labat (France) S Testud	**6**	4	4
(Canada) **P Hy-Boulais** (Germany) **W Probst**	**6**	**6**
LL	(Austria) M Maruska (Austria) B Schwartz	3	1
(Slovenia) **T Križan** (Switzerland) **P Schnyder**	**6**	**6**
(Germany) Adriana Barna (Germany) Anca Barna	1	4
(Czech Republic) **E Melicharová** (Czech Republic) **H Vildová**	**6**	**6**
4	(Italy) L Golarsa (Germany) C Singer	2	4
WC	(Austria) B Schett (Austria) J Wiesner	6	4
(Sweden) **Å Carlsson** (Italy) **F Perfetti**	**7**	**6**
Q	(Austria) M Schnell (Austria) P Wartusch	4	4
2	(Belgium) **S Appelmans** (United States) **C Rubin**	**6**	**6**

Quarterfinals
1	(France) **A Fusai** (France) **N Tauziat**	**6**	**6**
(France) A-G Sidot (Sweden) M Strandlund	2	4
3	(Italy) **S Farina** (Germany) **B Rittner**	5	**6**	**6**
(Canada) P Hy-Boulais (Germany) W Probst	**7**	1	3
(Slovenia) T Križan (Switzerland) P Schnyder	6	**7**	3
(Czech Republic) **E Melicharová** (Czech Republic) **H Vildová**	**7**	6	**6**
(Sweden) **Å Carlsson** (Italy) **F Perfetti**	**6**	**6**
2	(Belgium) S Appelmans (United States) C Rubin	3	4

Semifinals
1	(France) **A Fusai** (France) **N Tauziat**	**6**	**6**
3	(Italy) S Farina (Germany) B Rittner	4	1
(Czech Republic) **E Melicharová** (Czech Republic) **H Vildová**	**6**	**6**
(Sweden) Å Carlsson (Italy) F Perfetti	3	3

Final
1	(France) **Alexandra Fusai** (France) **Nathalie Tauziat**	4	**6**	**6**
(Czech Republic) Eva Melicharová (Czech Republic) Helena Vildová	**6**	3	1
