= 1998 EA-Generali Ladies Linz =

- Date: 23 February – 1 March
- Edition: 12th
- Category: Tier II
- Draw: 28s / 16D
- Prize money: $450,000
- Surface: Carpet / indoor
- Location: Linz, Austria
- Venue: Intersport Arena

Champions

Singles
- (Czech Republic) Jana Novotná

Doubles
- (France) Alexandra Fusai / (France) Nathalie Tauziat
← 1997 ·	Linz Open	· 1999 →

The 1998 EA-Generali Ladies Linz was a women's tennis tournament played on indoor carpet courts at the Intersport Arena in Linz, Austria that was part of Tier II of the 1998 WTA Tour. It was the 12th edition of the tournament and was held from 23 February through 1 March 1998. First-seeded Jana Novotná won the singles title.

== Finals ==
=== Singles ===
(Czech Republic) Jana Novotná defeated (Belgium) Dominique Van Roost 6–1, 7–6

- It was Novotná's 1st title of the year and the 87th of her career.

=== Doubles ===
(France) Alexandra Fusai / (France) Nathalie Tauziat defeated (Russia) Anna Kournikova / (Latvia) Larisa Savchenko 6–3, 3–6, 6–4

- It was Fusai's 1st title of the year and the 5th of her career. It was Tauziat's 1st title of the year and the 19th of her career.
