= 2003 Generali Ladies Linz =

- Date: 20–26 October
- Edition: 17th
- Category: Tier II Series
- Prize money: USD585,000
- Surface: Hard (indoor)
- Location: Linz, Austria
- Venue: TipsArena Linz

Champions

Singles
- (Japan) Ai Sugiyama

Doubles
- (South Africa) Liezel Huber / (Japan) Ai Sugiyama
- Linz Open

The 2003 Generali Ladies Linz is the 2003 Tier II WTA Tour tournament of the annually-held Generali Ladies Linz tennis tournament. It was the 17th edition of the tournament and was held from 20 October until 26 October 2003 at the TipsArena Linz. Second-seeded Ai Sugiyama won the singles title.

== Finals ==
=== Singles ===
(Japan) Ai Sugiyama defeated (Russia) Nadia Petrova, 7–5, 6–4.

- It was Sugiyama's 5th WTA singles title, and second title of the year.

=== Doubles ===
(South Africa) Liezel Huber / (Japan) Ai Sugiyama defeated (France) Marion Bartoli / (Italy) Silvia Farina Elia, 6–2, 7–6^{(8–6)}.

- It was Huber's 9th WTA doubles title, and fifth of the year. It was Sugiyama's 28th WTA doubles title, and eighth of the year. This was the first and only doubles titles they won together as a pair.

== Points and prize money ==
=== Point distribution ===
Event	W	F	SF	QF	Round of 16	Round of 32	Q	Q3	Q2	Q1
Singles	195	137	88	49	25	1	11.75	6.75	4	1
Doubles	195	137	88	49	1	—N/a	11.75	—N/a	—N/a	—N/a

=== Prize money ===
Event	W	F	SF	QF	Round of 16	Round of 32	Q3	Q2	Q1
Singles	$95,500	$51,000	$27,300	$14,600	$7,820	$4,175	$2,230	$1,195	$640
Doubles *	$30,000	$16,120	$8,620	$4,610	$2,465	—N/a	—N/a	—N/a	—N/a

_{* per team}

== Singles main draw entrants ==
=== Seeds ===
Country	Player	Rank	Seed
RUS	Anastasia Myskina	9	1
JPN	Ai Sugiyama	11	2
RUS	Vera Zvonareva	12	3
RUS	Nadia Petrova	14	4
SVK	Daniela Hantuchová	15	5
ISR	Anna Pistolesi	16	6
ARG	Paola Suárez	17	7
SUI	Patty Schnyder	18	8

Rankings are as of 10 October 2003.

=== Other entrants ===
The following players received wildcards into the singles main draw:

- (Austria) Sybille Bammer
- (Croatia) Karolina Šprem
- (Austria) Barbara Schett

The following players received entry from the qualifying draw:

- (Slovakia) Ľudmila Cervanová
- (Canada) Sonya Jeyaseelan
- (Czech Republic) Klára Koukalová
- (Slovenia) Maja Matevžič

=== Withdrawals ===
- (Belgium) Justine Henin-Hardenne → replaced by (France) Marion Bartoli
- (Spain) Conchita Martínez → replaced by (Switzerland) Marie-Gaïané Mikaelian
- (United States) Serena Williams → replaced by (United States) Alexandra Stevenson

== Doubles main draw entrants ==
=== Seeds ===
Country	Player	Country	Player	Player 1 Rank	Player 2 Rank	Seed
RSA	Liezel Huber	JPN	Ai Sugiyama	14	1	1
RUS	Elena Likhovtseva	RUS	Nadia Petrova	10	11	2
SVK	Daniela Hantuchová	ESP	Magüi Serna	26	39	3
AUT	Barbara Schett	SUI	Patty Schnyder	37	40	4

Rankings are as of 10 October 2003

=== Other entrants ===
The following pair received wildcards into the doubles main draw:

- (Austria) Verena Amesbauer / (Austria) Daniela Kix
