= 1998 EA-Generali Ladies Linz – Doubles =

Doubles
- 1998 EA-Generali Ladies Linz

Final
- Champions: (France) Alexandra Fusai (France) Nathalie Tauziat
- Runners-up: (Russia) Anna Kournikova (Latvia) Larisa Savchenko
- Score: 6–3, 3–6, 6–4

Details
- Draw: 16
- Seeds: 4

Events
Singles	Doubles
← 1997 ·	Linz Open	· 1999 →

Alexandra Fusai and Nathalie Tauziat were the defending champions and won in the final 6–3, 3–6, 6–4 against Anna Kournikova and Larisa Savchenko.

== Seeds ==
Champion seeds are indicated in bold text while text in italics indicates the round in which those seeds were eliminated.

1. (Indonesia) Yayuk Basuki / (Netherlands) Caroline Vis (semifinals)
2. (France) **Alexandra Fusai** / (France) **Nathalie Tauziat (champions)**
3. (Russia) Anna Kournikova / (Latvia) Larisa Savchenko (final)
4. (United States) Lisa Raymond / (Australia) Rennae Stubbs (first round)

== Draw ==
=== Key ===
- Q = Qualifier
- WC = Wild card
- LL = Lucky loser
- Alt = Alternate
- ITF = ITF entry
- PR = Protected ranking
- SR = Special ranking
- SE = Special exempt
- JE = Junior exempt
- JR = Junior Accelerator Programme entrant
- CO = College Accelerator Programme entrant
- NG = Next Gen Accelerator Program entrant
- w/o = Walkover
- r = Retired
- d = Defaulted

First round
1	(Indonesia) **Y Basuki** (Netherlands) **C Vis**	**6**	**7**
WC	(Austria) M Maruska (Austria) S Plischke	4	6
(Italy) **S Farina** (Belgium) **D Van Roost**	**w/o**
(Slovakia) K Habšudová (Argentina) F Labat
3	(Russia) **A Kournikova** (Latvia) **L Savchenko**	**6**	6	**6**
Q	(Sweden) Å Carlsson (Bulgaria) M Maleeva	4	**7**	2
(Czech Republic) R Bobková (Germany) C Schneider	6	6
(Belgium) **S Appelmans** (Netherlands) **M Oremans**	**7**	**7**
(Czech Republic) P Langrová (Bulgaria) P Stoyanova	3	5
(France) **A-G Sidot** (Germany) **E Wagner**	**6**	**7**
(Germany) **W Probst** (Germany) **C Singer**	3	**6**	**6**
4	(United States) L Raymond (Australia) R Stubbs	**6**	3	4
(Austria) K Kschwendt (Italy) F Perfetti	3	3
(Croatia) **I Majoli** (Germany) **B Rittner**	**6**	**6**
(Czech Republic) E Melicharová (Czech Republic) H Vildová	5	2
2	(France) **A Fusai** (France) **N Tauziat**	**7**	**6**

Quarterfinals
1	(Indonesia) **Y Basuki** (Netherlands) **C Vis**	**6**	**7**
(Italy) S Farina (Belgium) D Van Roost	2	5
3	(Russia) **A Kournikova** (Latvia) **L Savchenko**	**6**	**7**
(Belgium) S Appelmans (Netherlands) M Oremans	1	6
(France) **A-G Sidot** (Germany) **E Wagner**	**6**	**6**
(Germany) W Probst (Germany) C Singer	3	0
(Croatia) I Majoli (Germany) B Rittner	**7**	5	4
2	(France) **A Fusai** (France) **N Tauziat**	6	**7**	**6**

Semifinals
1	(Indonesia) Y Basuki (Netherlands) C Vis	6	1
3	(Russia) **A Kournikova** (Latvia) **L Savchenko**	**7**	**6**
(France) A-G Sidot (Germany) E Wagner	6	**6**	2
2	(France) **A Fusai** (France) **N Tauziat**	**7**	3	**6**

Final
3	(Russia) Anna Kournikova (Latvia) Larisa Savchenko	3	**6**	4
2	(France) **Alexandra Fusai** (France) **Nathalie Tauziat**	**6**	3	**6**
