= 1999 Generali Ladies Linz – Singles =

Singles
- 1999 Generali Ladies Linz

Final
- Champion: (France) Mary Pierce
- Runner-up: (France) Sandrine Testud
- Score: 7–6^{(7–2)}, 6–1

Details
- Draw: 28
- Seeds: 8

Events
Singles	Doubles
← 1998 ·	Linz Open	· 2000 →

Jana Novotná was the reigning champion, but she retired from tennis earlier in the year.

Mary Pierce won the title, defeating compatriot Sandrine Testud in the final, 7–6^{(7–2)}, 6–1.

== Seeds ==
1. (France) Mary Pierce (champion)
2. (Austria) Barbara Schett (second round)
3. (France) Nathalie Tauziat (quarterfinals)
4. (France) Amélie Mauresmo (semifinals)
5. (France) Sandrine Testud (final)
6. (Russia) Anna Kournikova (second round)
7. (Russia) Elena Likhovtseva (first round)
8. (Germany) Anke Huber (first round)

== Draw ==
=== Key ===
- Q = Qualifier
- WC = Wild card
- LL = Lucky loser
- Alt = Alternate
- ITF = ITF entry
- PR = Protected ranking
- SR = Special ranking
- SE = Special exempt
- JE = Junior exempt
- JR = Junior Accelerator Programme entrant
- CO = College Accelerator Programme entrant
- NG = Next Gen Accelerator Program entrant
- w/o = Walkover
- r = Retired
- d = Defaulted

=== Finals ===
Semifinals
1	(France) Mary Pierce	7	6
4	(France) Amélie Mauresmo	5	3
5	(France) Sandrine Testud	6	6
(France) Sarah Pitkowski	4	2

Final
1	(France) Mary Pierce	7^{7}	6
5	(France) Sandrine Testud	6^{2}	1

=== Top half ===
First round
SR	(Bulgaria) M Maleeva	3	3
(Austria) S Plischke	6	6
(Luxembourg) A Kremer	6^{3}	2
(Romania) I Spîrlea	7^{7}	6
LL	(Zimbabwe) C Black	4	4
6	(Russia) A Kournikova	6	6
SR	(South Africa) J Kruger	2	1
(Switzerland) P Schnyder	6	6
(Slovakia) H Nagyová	3	6	3
(Croatia) S Talaja	6	4	6
WC	(Austria) B Schwartz	7	6
7	(Russia) E Likhovtseva	5	1

Second round
1	(France) M Pierce	7^{8}	6
(Austria) S Plischke	6^{6}	2
(Romania) I Spîrlea	6	0	6
6	(Russia) A Kournikova	0	6	1
4	(France) A Mauresmo	6	6
(Switzerland) P Schnyder	2	2
(Croatia) S Talaja	2	1
WC	(Austria) B Schwartz	6	6

Quarterfinals
1	(France) M Pierce	3	6	6
(Romania) I Spîrlea	6	2	3
4	(France) A Mauresmo	3	7	4
WC	(Austria) B Schwartz	6	5	1^{r}

Semifinals
1	(France) M Pierce	7	6
4	(France) A Mauresmo	5	3

=== Bottom half ===
First round
5	(France) S Testud	7	6
Q	(Germany) B Rittner	5	2
(Spain) M Sánchez Lorenzo	0	3
Q	(Czech Republic) S Kleinová	6	6
(Japan) A Sugiyama	3	0
Q	(Netherlands) A Hopmans	6	6
8	(Germany) A Huber	2	3
(France) A-G Sidot	6	6
(Italy) S Farina Elia	1	0^{r}
(France) S Pitkowski	6	1
Q	(Czech Republic) D Chládková	6	6
WC	(Austria) P Wartusch	3	2

Second round
5	(France) S Testud	6	7
Q	(Czech Republic) S Kleinová	3	5
Q	(Netherlands) A Hopmans	5	2
3	(France) N Tauziat	7	6
(France) A-G Sidot	6	4	1
(France) S Pitkowski	4	6	6
Q	(Czech Republic) D Chládková	6	6
2/WC	(Austria) B Schett	2	1

Quarterfinals
5	(France) S Testud	6	3	6
3	(France) N Tauziat	3	6	3
(France) S Pitkowski	6	6
Q	(Czech Republic) D Chládková	2	0

Semifinals
5	(France) S Testud	6	6
(France) S Pitkowski	4	2

== Qualifying ==
=== Seeds ===
1. (Belgium) Sabine Appelmans (first round)
2. (Australia) Jelena Dokic (second round)
3. (Slovakia) Karina Habšudová (second round)
4. (Zimbabwe) Cara Black (qualifying competition, lucky loser)
5. (Germany) Barbara Rittner (qualified)
6. (Italy) Rita Grande (qualifying competition)
7. (Australia) Nicole Pratt (qualifying competition)
8. (France) Amélie Cocheteux (qualifying competition)

=== Qualifiers ===
1. (Czech Republic) Denisa Chládková
2. (Germany) Barbara Rittner
3. (Czech Republic) Sandra Kleinová
4. (Netherlands) Amanda Hopmans

=== Lucky losers ===
1. (Zimbabwe) Cara Black

== Qualifying draw ==
=== Key ===
- Q = Qualifier
- WC = Wild card
- LL = Lucky loser
- Alt = Alternate
- ITF = ITF entry
- PR = Protected ranking
- SR = Special ranking
- SE = Special exempt
- JE = Junior exempt
- JR = Junior Accelerator Programme entrant
- CO = College Accelerator Programme entrant
- NG = Next Gen Accelerator Program entrant
- w/o = Walkover
- r = Retired
- d = Defaulted

=== First qualifier ===
First round
1	(Belgium) Sabine Appelmans	1	4
(Czech Republic) Denisa Chládková	6	6
(France) Émilie Loit	6	6
(Federal Republic of Yugoslavia) Sandra Naćuk	3	3
(Netherlands) Miriam Oremans	6	6
(United States) Erika deLone	2	3
(Germany) Anca Barna	4	2
8	(France) Amélie Cocheteux	6	6

Second round
(Czech Republic) Denisa Chládková	7	6
(France) Émilie Loit	5	0
(Netherlands) Miriam Oremans	7	6^{7}	1
8	(France) Amélie Cocheteux	5	7^{9}	6

Qualifying competition
(Czech Republic) Denisa Chládková	7	6
8	(France) Amélie Cocheteux	5	4

=== Second qualifier ===
First round
4	(Zimbabwe) Cara Black	6	6
WC	(Austria) Evelyn Fauth	0	2
(Russia) Anastasia Myskina	6	7^{7}
(Bulgaria) Lubomira Bacheva	3	6^{4}
WC	(Germany) Angelika Bachmann	3	6	6
(Switzerland) Miroslava Vavrinec	6	3	4
(Slovakia) Ľudmila Cervanová	4	0
5	(Germany) Barbara Rittner	6	6

Second round
4	(Zimbabwe) Cara Black	6	6
(Russia) Anastasia Myskina	2	3
WC	(Germany) Angelika Bachmann	3	4
5	(Germany) Barbara Rittner	6	6

Qualifying competition
4	(Zimbabwe) Cara Black	6^{4}	3
5	(Germany) Barbara Rittner	7^{7}	6

=== Third qualifier ===
First round
7	(Australia) Nicole Pratt	6	6
(Poland) Magdalena Grzybowska	2	2
(Slovenia) Tina Pisnik	4	5
(Hungary) Anna Földényi	6	7
(Czech Republic) Sandra Kleinová	6	6
(Czech Republic) Adriana Gerši	1	4
Alt	(Romania) Cătălina Cristea	2	2
3	(Slovakia) Karina Habšudová	6	6

Second round
7	(Australia) Nicole Pratt	6	6
(Hungary) Anna Földényi	4	4
(Czech Republic) Sandra Kleinová	1
3	(Slovakia) Karina Habšudová	4^{r}

Qualifying competition
7	(Australia) Nicole Pratt	6	5	1
(Czech Republic) Sandra Kleinová	2	7	6

=== Fourth qualifier ===
First round
6	(Italy) Rita Grande	6	6
(Czech Republic) Lenka Němečková	4	0
(Sweden) Åsa Carlsson	0	4
WC	(Austria) Marion Maruska	6	6
(Netherlands) Amanda Hopmans	6	6
WC	(Austria) Sybille Bammer	1	4
(Croatia) Jelena Kostanić	6^{2}	3
2	(Australia) Jelena Dokic	7^{7}	6

Second round
6	(Italy) Rita Grande	6	7
WC	(Austria) Marion Maruska	2	5
(Netherlands) Amanda Hopmans	4	6	6
2	(Australia) Jelena Dokic	6	3	3

Qualifying competition
6	(Italy) Rita Grande	3	4
(Netherlands) Amanda Hopmans	6	6
