= 2004 Generali Ladies Linz =

- Date: 23–30 October
- Edition: 18th
- Category: Tier II Series
- Draw: 32S / 16D
- Prize money: USD585,000
- Surface: Hard (indoor)
- Location: Linz, Austria
- Venue: TipsArena Linz

Champions

Singles
- (France) Amélie Mauresmo

Doubles
- (Slovakia) Janette Husárová / (Russia) Elena Likhovtseva
- Linz Open

The 2004 Generali Ladies Linz is the 2004 Tier II WTA Tour tournament of the annually-held Generali Ladies Linz tennis tournament. It was the 18th edition of the tournament and was held from 23 October until 30 October 2004 at the TipsArena Linz. First-seeded Amélie Mauresmo won the singles title.

== Finals ==
=== Singles ===
- (France) Amélie Mauresmo defeated (Russia) Elena Bovina, 6–2, 6–0.

It was Mauresmo's 14th WTA singles title, and fourth title of the year.

=== Doubles ===
- (Slovakia) Janette Husárová / (Russia) Elena Likhovtseva defeated (France) Nathalie Dechy / (Switzerland) Patty Schnyder, 6–2, 7–5.

It was Husárová's 18th WTA doubles title, and third of the year. It was Likhovtseva's 20th WTA doubles title, and third of the year. This was the first of two doubles titles they won together as a pair.

== Points and prize money ==
=== Point distribution ===
Event	W	F	SF	QF	Round of 16	Round of 32	Q	Q3	Q2	Q1
Singles	195	137	88	49	25	1	11.75	6.75	4	1
Doubles	195	137	88	49	1	—N/a	11.75	—N/a	—N/a	—N/a

=== Prize money ===
Event	W	F	SF	QF	Round of 16	Round of 32	Q3	Q2	Q1
Singles	$95,500	$51,000	$27,300	$14,600	$7,820	$4,175	$2,230	$1,195	$640
Doubles *	$30,000	$16,120	$8,620	$4,610	$2,465	—N/a	—N/a	—N/a	—N/a

_{* per team}

== Singles main draw entrants ==
=== Seeds ===
Country	Player	Rank	Seed
FRA	Amélie Mauresmo	2	1
~~RUS~~	~~Anastasia Myskina~~	~~8~~	~~2~~
USA	Serena Williams	9	3
RUS	Vera Zvonareva	12	4
RUS	Nadia Petrova	13	5
JPN	Ai Sugiyama	14	6
SUI	Patty Schnyder	15	7
CRO	Karolina Šprem	17	8
RUS	Elena Bovina	24	9

Rankings are as of 18 October 2004.

=== Other entrants ===
The following players received wildcards into the singles main draw:

- (Austria) Sybille Bammer
- (France) Amélie Mauresmo
- (Austria) Barbara Schett

The following players received entry from the qualifying draw:

- (Russia) Vera Dushevina
- (Russia) Alina Jidkova
- (Germany) Julia Schruff
- (Slovakia) Martina Suchá

The following players received entry as lucky losers:

- (Poland) Marta Domachowska
- (United States) Lindsay Lee-Waters

=== Withdrawals ===
- (Russia) Anastasia Myskina → replaced by (Poland) Marta Domachowska
- (Italy) Flavia Pennetta → replaced by (United States) Lindsay Lee-Waters

=== Retirements ===
- (Spain) Conchita Martínez (Achilles tendon strain)

== Doubles main draw entrants ==
=== Seeds ===
Country	Player	Country	Player	Player 1 Rank	Player 2 Rank	Seed
SVK	Janette Husárová	RUS	Elena Likhovtseva	13	3	1
RSA	Liezel Huber	JPN	Ai Sugiyama	11	6	2
ESP	Magüi Serna	VEN	María Vento-Kabchi	45	22	3
FRA	Marion Bartoli	SVK	Daniela Hantuchová	29	78	4

Rankings are as of 18 October 2004

=== Other entrants ===
The following pairs received wildcards into the doubles main draw:

- (Austria) Daniela Kix / (Austria) Yvonne Meusburger
- (Croatia) Karolina Šprem / (Russia) Vera Zvonareva

The following pair received entry into the main draw via a protected ranking:

- (Germany) Julia Schruff / (Sweden) Åsa Svensson

The following pair received entry from the qualifying draw:

- (Serbia and Montenegro) Jelena Janković / (Germany) Caroline Schneider
