= 1997 EA-Generali Ladies Linz – Singles =

Singles
- 1997 EA-Generali Ladies Linz
- 1996 Champion: (Belgium) Sabine Appelmans

Final
- Champion: (United States) Chanda Rubin
- Runner-up: (Slovakia) Karina Habšudová
- Score: 6–4, 6–2

Details
- Draw: 30
- Seeds: 8

Events
Singles	Doubles
← 1996 ·	Linz Open	· 1998 →

Sabine Appelmans was the defending champion but lost in the second round to Barbara Rittner.

Chanda Rubin won in the final 6–4, 6–2 against Karina Habšudová.

== Seeds ==
A champion seed is indicated in bold text while text in italics indicates the round in which that seed was eliminated. The top two seeds received a bye to the second round.

1. (Czech Republic) Jana Novotná (semifinals)
2. (Slovakia) Karina Habšudová (final)
3. (Austria) Judith Wiesner (semifinals)
4. (Belgium) Sabine Appelmans (second round)
5. (Bulgaria) Magdalena Maleeva (quarterfinals)
6. (France) Nathalie Tauziat (quarterfinals)
7. (United States) **Chanda Rubin (champion)**
8. (Sweden) Åsa Carlsson (quarterfinals)

== Draw ==
=== Key ===
- Q = Qualifier
- WC = Wild card
- LL = Lucky loser
- Alt = Alternate
- ITF = ITF entry
- PR = Protected ranking
- SR = Special ranking
- SE = Special exempt
- JE = Junior exempt
- JR = Junior Accelerator Programme entrant
- CO = College Accelerator Programme entrant
- NG = Next Gen Accelerator Program entrant
- w/o = Walkover
- r = Retired
- d = Defaulted

=== Final ===
Final
7	(United States) **Chanda Rubin**	**6**	**6**
2	(Slovakia) Karina Habšudová	4	2

=== Section 1 ===
First round
LL	(Germany) W Probst	5	1
(Italy) **S Farina**	**7**	**6**
(Italy) R Grande	**6**	1	3
(Belgium) **E Callens**	4	**6**	**6**
(United States) A Miller	3	**6**	2
5	(Bulgaria) **M Maleeva**	**6**	2	**6**
4	(Belgium) **S Appelmans**	**7**	**6**
(Austria) K Kschwendt	5	3
(Germany) **B Rittner**	**7**	**5**
Q	(Germany) E Wagner	5	0	r
(France) **S Testud**	4	**6**	**6**
(Canada) P Hy-Boulais	**6**	0	3
(Switzerland) P Schnyder	5	0
7	(United States) **C Rubin**	**7**	**6**

Second round
1	(Czech Republic) **J Novotná**	**6**	1	**6**
(Italy) S Farina	4	**6**	3
(Belgium) E Callens	2	2
5	(Bulgaria) **M Maleeva**	**6**	**6**
4	(Belgium) S Appelmans	**6**	1	4
(Germany) **B Rittner**	3	**6**	**6**
(France) S Testud	4	3
7	(United States) **C Rubin**	**6**	**6**

Quarterfinals
1	(Czech Republic) **J Novotná**	**6**	**6**
5	(Bulgaria) M Maleeva	0	3
(Germany) B Rittner	**6**	6	4
7	(United States) **C Rubin**	4	**7**	**6**

Semifinals
1	(Czech Republic) J Novotná	5	**7**	3
7	(United States) **C Rubin**	**7**	5	**6**

=== Section 2 ===
First round
6	(France) **N Tauziat**	**6**	**7**
(Italy) G Pizzichini	4	5
(France) A-G Sidot	**6**	3	6
LL	(France) **A Fusai**	3	**6**	**7**
(Germany) P Begerow	3	1
(Italy) **F Perfetti**	**6**	**6**
Q	(France) A Mauresmo	**6**	5	1
3	(Austria) **J Wiesner**	3	**7**	**6**
8	(Sweden) **Å Carlsson**	**6**	**7**
(Argentina) F Labat	0	6
Q	(Slovakia) **R Zrubáková**	**6**	**7**
WC	(Austria) M Maruska	4	6
Q	(Germany) **A Glass**	**6**	**6**
WC	(Austria) M Schnell	4	2

Second round
6	(France) **N Tauziat**	**7**	**6**
LL	(France) A Fusai	6	4
(Italy) F Perfetti	2	**6**	3
3	(Austria) **J Wiesner**	**6**	4	**6**
8	(Sweden) **Å Carlsson**	**6**	**6**
Q	(Slovakia) R Zrubáková	4	4
Q	(Germany) A Glass	**7**	4	3
2	(Slovakia) **K Habšudová**	6	**6**	**6**

Quarterfinals
6	(France) N Tauziat	5	2
3	(Austria) **J Wiesner**	**7**	**6**
8	(Sweden) Å Carlsson	2	2
2	(Slovakia) **K Habšudová**	**6**	**6**

Semifinals
3	(Austria) J Wiesner	3	**6**	3
2	(Slovakia) **K Habšudová**	**6**	4	**6**
