= 2002 Generali Ladies Linz – Doubles =

Doubles
- 2002 Generali Ladies Linz

Final
- Champions: (Federal Republic of Yugoslavia) Jelena Dokic (Russia) Nadia Petrova
- Runners-up: (Japan) Rika Fujiwara (Japan) Ai Sugiyama
- Score: 6–3, 6–2

Details
- Draw: 16
- Seeds: 4

Events
Singles	Doubles
← 2001 ·	Linz Open	· 2003 →

Jelena Dokic and Nadia Petrova were the defending champions, and successfully defended their title, defeating Rika Fujiwara and Ai Sugiyama in the final, 6–3, 6–2.

== Seeds ==
1. (Spain) Virginia Ruano Pascual / (Argentina) Paola Suárez (quarterfinals)
2. (Slovakia) Daniela Hantuchová / (United States) Meghann Shaughnessy (withdrew)
3. (Japan) Rika Fujiwara / (Japan) Ai Sugiyama (final)
4. (Federal Republic of Yugoslavia) Jelena Dokic / (Russia) Nadia Petrova (champions)

== Draw ==
=== Key ===
- Q = Qualifier
- WC = Wild card
- LL = Lucky loser
- Alt = Alternate
- ITF = ITF entry
- PR = Protected ranking
- SR = Special ranking
- SE = Special exempt
- JE = Junior exempt
- JR = Junior Accelerator Programme entrant
- CO = College Accelerator Programme entrant
- NG = Next Gen Accelerator Program entrant
- w/o = Walkover
- r = Retired
- d = Defaulted

=== Draw ===
First round
1	(Spain) V Ruano Pascual (Argentina) P Suárez	5	6	6
(United States) C Rubin (Austria) B Schett	7	3	3
(Italy) F Schiavone (Argentina) P Tarabini	6^{4}	4
(Hungary) P Mandula (Austria) P Wartusch	7^{7}	6
3	(Japan) R Fujiwara (Japan) A Sugiyama	6	7^{8}
(Germany) A Rösch (Croatia) S Talaja	3	6^{6}
(Croatia) I Majoli (Spain) C Martínez	6	6
(Chinese Taipei) J Lee (Indonesia) W Prakusya	3	2
WC	(Austria) D Klemenschits (Austria) S Klemenschits	2	2
(Germany) E Daniilidou (Netherlands) C Vis	6	6
Q	(Germany) G Arn (Switzerland) M-G Mikaelian	2	1
4	(Federal Republic of Yugoslavia) J Dokic (Russia) N Petrova	6	6
(Germany) A Barna (Germany) V Paffrath	1	2
(Russia) L Krasnoroutskaya (Russia) T Panova	6	6
(Bulgaria) M Geznenge (Germany) M Weingärtner	6	6
LL	(United States) J Craybas (Croatia) M Murić	3	3

Quarterfinals
1	(Spain) V Ruano Pascual (Argentina) P Suárez	6	6^{3}	6^{4}
(Hungary) P Mandula (Austria) P Wartusch	0	7^{7}	7^{7}
3	(Japan) R Fujiwara (Japan) A Sugiyama	w/o
(Croatia) I Majoli (Spain) C Martínez
(Greece) E Daniilidou (Netherlands) C Vis	3	4
4	(Federal Republic of Yugoslavia) J Dokic (Russia) N Petrova	6	6
(Russia) L Krasnoroutskaya (Russia) T Panova	4	6	6
(Bulgaria) M Geznenge (Germany) M Weingärtner	6	4	2

Semifinals
(Hungary) P Mandula (Austria) P Wartusch	3	5
3	(Japan) R Fujiwara (Japan) A Sugiyama	6	7
4	(Federal Republic of Yugoslavia) J Dokic (Russia) N Petrova	7	6
(Russia) L Krasnoroutskaya (Russia) T Panova	5	0

Final
3	(Japan) R Fujiwara (Japan) A Sugiyama	3	2
4	(Federal Republic of Yugoslavia) J Dokic (Russia) N Petrova	6	6

== Qualifying ==
=== Seeds ===
1. (Germany) Greta Arn / (Switzerland) Marie-Gaïané Mikaelian (qualified)
2. (United States) Jill Craybas / (Croatia) Maja Murić (qualifying competition, lucky losers)

=== Qualifiers ===
1. (Germany) Greta Arn / (Switzerland) Marie-Gaïané Mikaelian

=== Lucky losers ===
1. (United States) Jill Craybas / (Croatia) Maja Murić

Qualifying competition
1	(Germany) Greta Arn (Switzerland) Marie-Gaïané Mikaelian	8
2	(United States) Jill Craybas (Croatia) Maja Murić	5
