= 2002 Generali Ladies Linz =

- Date: 21–27 October
- Edition: 16th
- Category: Tier II Series
- Prize money: USD585,000
- Surface: Hard (indoor)
- Location: Linz, Austria
- Venue: Design Center Linz

Champions

Singles
- (Belgium) Justine Henin

Doubles
- (Federal Republic of Yugoslavia) Jelena Dokic / (Russia) Nadia Petrova
- Linz Open

The 2002 Generali Ladies Linz is the 2002 Tier II WTA Tour tournament of the annually-held Generali Ladies Linz women's tennis tournament. It was the 16th edition of the tournament and was held from 21 October until 27 October 2002 at the Design Center Linz. Fourth-seeded Justine Henin won the singles title.

== Finals ==
=== Singles ===
- (Belgium) Justine Henin defeated (United States) Alexandra Stevenson, 6–3, 6–0.

It was Henin's 6th WTA singles title, and second title of the year.

=== Doubles ===
- (Federal Republic of Yugoslavia) Jelena Dokic / (Russia) Nadia Petrova defeated (Japan) Rika Fujiwara / (Japan) Ai Sugiyama, 6–3, 6–2.

It was Dokic's 4th WTA and last doubles title, and first of the year. It was Petrova's 3rd WTA doubles title, and first of the year. The pair were the defending champions, and this was the second and final doubles title they won together as a pair.

== Points and prize money ==
=== Point distribution ===
| Event | W | F | SF | QF | Round of 16 | Round of 32 | Q | Q3 | Q2 | Q1 |
| Singles | 195 | 137 | 88 | 49 | 25 | 1 | 11.75 | 6.75 | 4 | 1 |
| Doubles | 195 | 137 | 88 | 49 | 1 | —N/a | 11.75 | —N/a | —N/a | —N/a |

=== Prize money ===
| Event | W | F | SF | QF | Round of 16 | Round of 32 | Q3 | Q2 | Q1 |
| Singles | $95,500 | $51,000 | $27,300 | $14,600 | $7,820 | $4,175 | $2,230 | $1,195 | $640 |
| Doubles * | $30,000 | $16,120 | $8,620 | $4,610 | $2,465 | —N/a | —N/a | —N/a | —N/a |

_{* per team}

== Singles main draw entrants ==
=== Seeds ===
| Country | Player | Rank | Seed |
|---|---|---|---|
| USA | Jennifer Capriati | 3 | 1 |
| ~~USA~~ | ~~Lindsay Davenport~~ | ~~10~~ | ~~2~~ |
| FR Yugoslavia | Jelena Dokic | 6 | 3 |
| BEL | Justine Henin | 8 | 4 |
| SVK | Daniela Hantuchová | 9 | 5 |
| RUS | Anastasia Myskina | 12 | 6 |
| USA | Chanda Rubin | 13 | 7 |
| ITA | Silvia Farina Elia | 14 | 8 |
| ISR | Anna Smashnova | 16 | 9 |

Rankings are as of 14 October 2002.

=== Other entrants ===
The following players received wildcards into the singles main draw:

- (Austria) Daniela Kix
- (Austria) Barbara Schett
- (Austria) Patricia Wartusch

The following players received entry from the qualifying draw:

- (Germany) Anca Barna
- (Czech Republic) Denisa Chládková
- (Russia) Lina Krasnoroutskaya
- (Switzerland) Marie-Gaïané Mikaelian

The following players received entry as lucky losers:

- (United States) Jill Craybas
- (Hungary) Petra Mandula

=== Withdrawals ===
- (United States) Lindsay Davenport → replaced by (United States) Jill Craybas
- (Switzerland) Martina Hingis → replaced by (Spain) Conchita Martínez
- (Switzerland) Patty Schnyder → replaced by (Hungary) Petra Mandula
- (United States) Serena Williams → replaced by (Italy) Francesca Schiavone

=== Retirements ===
- (Austria) Daniela Kix (Stomach cramps)

== Doubles main draw entrants ==
=== Seeds ===
| Country | Player | Country | Player | Player 1 Rank | Player 2 Rank | Seed |
|---|---|---|---|---|---|---|
| ESP | Virginia Ruano Pascual | ARG | Paola Suárez | 2 | 1 | 1 |
| ~~SVK~~ | ~~Daniela Hantuchová~~ | ~~USA~~ | ~~Meghann Shaughnessy~~ | ~~7~~ | ~~15~~ | ~~2~~ |
| JPN | Rika Fujiwara | JPN | Ai Sugiyama | 17 | 12 | 3 |
| FR Yugoslavia | Jelena Dokic | RUS | Nadia Petrova | 14 | 34 | 4 |

Rankings are as of 14 October 2002.

=== Other entrants ===
The following pair received wildcards into the doubles main draw:

- (Austria) Daniela Klemenschits / (Austria) Sandra Klemenschits

The following pair received entry from the qualifying draw:

- (Germany) Greta Arn / (Switzerland) Marie-Gaïané Mikaelian

The following pair received entry as lucky losers:

- (United States) Jill Craybas / (Croatia) Maja Murić
