= Alina Jidkova =

Russian tennis player

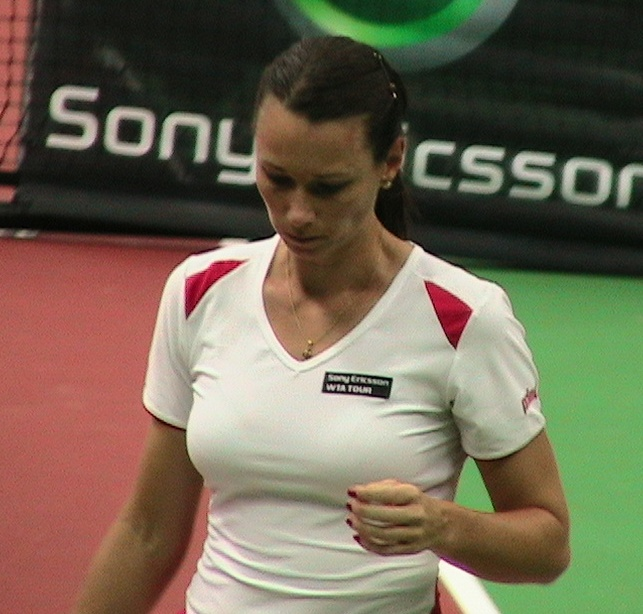
- Alina Jidkova at Kremlin Cup (2009)
- Country (sports): Russia
- Born: January 18, 1977 (age 48) Moscow, Soviet Union now Russia
- Height: 1.68 m (5 ft 6 in)
- Turned pro: 1993
- Retired: 2010
- Plays: Right (two-handed backhand)
- Prize money: $1,128,467

Singles
- Career record: 466–421
- Career titles: 9 ITF
- Highest ranking: No. 51 (7 March 2005)

Grand Slam singles results
- Australian Open: 3R (2000)
- French Open: 2R (2002)
- Wimbledon: 1R (2000, 2002, 2003, 2004, 2005)
- US Open: 2R (2006)

Doubles
- Career record: 281–332
- Career titles: 1 WTA, 9 ITF
- Highest ranking: No. 50 (4 August 2003)

Grand Slam doubles results
- Australian Open: 2R (2003)
- French Open: 2R (2000, 2003, 2004)
- Wimbledon: 2R (2002, 2005, 2008)
- US Open: 2R (2005)

Alina Vladimirovna Jidkova (Алина Владимировна Жидкова; born 18 January 1977) is a former professional tennis player from Russia. Throughout her career, she found success in both singles and doubles. Jidkova reached her career-high singles ranking of world No. 51 in March 2005, achieving strong singles performances against top players. She defeated several high-ranked opponents, including Serena Williams at Generali Linz in 2004, and also claimed wins over Mary Pierce, Jelena Janković, and Samantha Stosur.

In doubles, she won a WTA title at the Mexican Open 2005 and reached three other WTA finals, including the Memphis Open 2003, Québec Open 2006, and Cincinnati Open 2007. Her doubles ranking peaked at No. 50 in August 2003.

== Career ==
In 2004, she reached the quarterfinals of Generali Ladies Linz after beating Serena Williams in straight sets. Aside from Williams, she has career victories against Jelena Janković, Mary Pierce, Samantha Stosur, Alicia Molik, Chanda Rubin, Amanda Coetzer, Brenda Schultz-McCarthy, Amy Frazier, Petra Martić, Mirjana Lučić-Baroni, Vera Dushevina and other notable players. In 2005, she won her single WTA Tour event, the Mexican Open doubles title in Acapulco, partnering with Tatiana Perebiynis. She has also finished runner-up on three other occasions.

=== Retirement and coaching career ===
She retired from professional tennis at the beginning of the 2011 season. Her last official singles match played was against Monica Puig, 2016 Olympic champion at the end of 2010 season. Being a PTA Certified Tennis Coach, she worked as a head coach for Galina Voskoboeva, Ksenia Pervak and Kaia Kanepi.

As a coach, Jidkova was part of the 2012 Olympics, coaching Galina Voskoboeva, who represented Team Kazakhstan. In 2017, she also coached Kaia Kanepi to reach the quarterfinals of the US Open.

Alongside her work with established athletes, she mentors young players, helping them reach the skill level needed for potential recruitment by top college tennis programs.

=== ITF World Tennis Masters Tour (seniors' circuit) ===
As of 2024, Jidkova has been playing doubles on the ITF World Tennis Masters Tour, now representing the United States of America. Partnering Julie Thu, she won both tournaments she entered so far, an MT1000 in Houston and an MT700 in Austin, Texas.

== Personal life ==
Nicknamed “Alinka”, Alina Jidkova was born in Moscow, then part of the Soviet Union, into an athletic family. Her father, Vladimir, was an engineer and former weightlifter, while her mother, Lina, was a sprinter before becoming a school teacher. She grew up training at the Spartak Moscow Tennis Club and later the Spartak Tennis Academy.

Seeking further development, Jidkova moved to the United States to train at the Nick Bollettieri Tennis Academy. She now resides in The Woodlands, Texas with her husband, entrepreneur Sascha Ghods. The couple married on 18 December 2010 in Vienna, Austria, and have two children. Their son, currently training under Jidkova’s guidance, is also pursuing a career in tennis.

== WTA Tour Finals ==
=== Doubles: 4 (1 title, 3 runner-ups) ===
Result	No.	Date	Tournament	Surface	Partner	Opponents	Score
Loss	1.	Feb 2003	U.S. National Indoors	Hard (i)	(Australia) Bryanne Stewart	(Japan) Saori Obata (Japan) Akiko Morigami	1–6, 1–6
Win	2.	Feb 2005	Mexican Open	Clay	(Ukraine) Tatiana Perebiynis	(Spain) Rosa María Andrés Rodríguez (Spain) Conchita Martínez Granados	7–5, 6–3
Loss	3.	Oct 2006	Tournoi de Québec, Canada	Hard	(United States) Jill Craybas	(United States) Carly Gullickson (United States) Laura Granville	3–6, 4–6
Loss	4.	Jul 2007	Cincinnati Open, U.S.	Hard	(Belarus) Tatiana Poutchek	(United States) Bethanie Mattek (India) Sania Mirza	6–7^{(4–7)}, 5–7

== ITF finals ==
Legend
$100,000 tournaments
$75,000 tournaments
$50,000 tournaments
$25,000 tournaments
$10,000 tournaments

=== Singles: 17 (9–8) ===
Outcome	No.	Date	Tournament	Surface	Opponent	Score
Winner	1.	27 October 1997	ITF Culiacán, Mexico	Hard	(Canada) Petya Marinova	6–3, 6–0
Runner-up	2.	11 May 1998	ITF Poza Rica, Mexico	Hard	(Brazil) Vanessa Menga	2–6, 7–6, 1–6
Winner	3.	18 May 1998	ITF Coatzacoalcos, Mexico	Hard	(United States) Adria Engel	6–3, 6–1
Runner-up	4.	4 January 1999	ITF San Antonio, United States	Hard	(United States) Holly Parkinson	6–3, 4–6, 3–6
Winner	5.	17 January 1999	ITF Miami, United States	Hard	(United Kingdom) Helen Crook	6–2, 7–5
Runner-up	6.	31 January 1999	ITF Clearwater, United States	Hard	(Switzerland) Miroslava Vavrinec	0–6, 6–7
Winner	7.	19 July 1999	ITF Peachtree, United States	Hard	(United States) Erika deLone	6–7, 7–6, 6–4
Runner-up	8.	16 July 2000	ITF Peachtree, United States	Hard	(United States) Sandra Cacic	0–6, 2–4 ret.
Winner	9.	11 September 2000	ITF Hopewell Junction, United States	Hard	(United States) Jennifer Hopkins	6–3, 6–0
Winner	10.	9 October 2000	ITF Miramar, United States	Clay	(Paraguay) Rossana de los Ríos	1–6, 7–6, 6–2
Runner-up	11.	27 November 2000	ITF Tucson, United States	Hard	(Hungary) Katalin Marosi	7–6, 4–6, 3–6
Runner-up	12.	29 January 2001	ITF Clearwater, United States	Hard	(Hungary) Anikó Kapros	3–6, 2–6
Runner-up	13.	29 January 2001	ITF Fresno, United States	Hard	(United States) Marissa Irvin	2–6, 1–6
Winner	14.	5 November 2001	ITF Pittsburgh, United States	Hard (i)	(Canada) Marie-Ève Pelletier	6–4, 6–1
Winner	15.	23 July 2002	ITF Louisville, United States	Hard	(Japan) Saori Obata	6–3, 6–4
Winner	16.	9 January 2007	ITF Tampa, United States	Hard	(Czech Republic) Olga Vymetálková	6–2, 6–2
Runner-up	17.	5 June 2007	ITF Madrid, Spain	Clay	(Spain) Carla Suárez Navarro	2–6, 1–6

=== Doubles: 30 (9–21) ===
Outcome	No.	Date	Tournament	Surface	Partner	Opponents	Score
Runner-up	1.	21 February 1994	ITF Amadora, Portugal	Hard	(Russia) Anna Linkova	(Bulgaria) Teodora Nedeva (Bulgaria) Antoaneta Pandjerova	3–6, 1–6
Runner-up	2.	29 January 1996	Open de Saint-Malo, France	Hard (i)	(Czech Republic) Pavlina Bartůňková	(Greece) Ariadne Katsouli (France) Bérangère Quillot	2–6, 2–6
Runner-up	3.	4 August 1996	ITF Catania, Italy	Clay	(Bulgaria) Teodora Nedeva	(Italy) Katia Altilia (Italy) Laura Fodorean	6–1, 4–6, 3–6
Winner	4.	6 October 1996	ITF Langenthal, Switzerland	Carpet (i)	(Czech Republic) Helena Vildová	(Switzerland) Caecilia Charbonnier (Switzerland) Andrea Schwarz	6–4, 6–4
Winner	5.	23 March 1997	ITF Victoria, Mexico	Hard	(Mexico) Paola Arrangoiz	(Mexico) Karin Palme (Mexico) Graciela Vélez	5–7, 6–0, 6–2
Runner-up	6.	27 October 1997	ITF Culiacán, Mexico	Hard	(Mexico) Paola Arrangoiz	(Mexico) Lucila Becerra (Mexico) Isabela Petrov	5–7, 0–6
Runner-up	7.	19 January 1998	ITF Miami, U.S.	Hard	(Switzerland) Aliénor Tricerri	(United States) Lilia Osterloh (Slovakia) Zuzana Valeková	4–6, 4–6
Winner	8.	4 May 1998	ITF Tampico, Mexico	Hard	(United States) Adria Engel	(Chile) Paula Cabezas (Brazil) Vanessa Menga	7–6, 7–5
Runner-up	9.	11 May 1998	ITF Poza Rica, Mexico	Hard	(United States) Adria Engel	(Chile) Paula Cabezas (Brazil) Vanessa Menga	6–3, 2–6, 2–6
Runner-up	10.	18 May 1998	ITF Coatzacoalcos, Mexico	Hard	(United States) Adria Engel	(Chile) Paula Cabezas (Brazil) Vanessa Menga	3–6, 2–6
Winner	11.	23 November 1998	ITF Culiacán, Mexico	Clay	(Canada) Renata Kolbovic	(Hungary) Zsófia Gubacsi (Switzerland) Aliénor Tricerri	6–3, 6–2
Runner-up	12.	4 January 1999	ITF San Antonio, U.S.	Hard	(United States) Holly Parkinson	(Australia) Kylie Hunt (United States) Julie Thu	6–7, 4–6
Runner-up	13.	8 February 1999	ITF Rockford, U.S.	Hard (i)	(United States) Holly Parkinson	(United States) Lilia Osterloh (United States) Katie Schlukebir	6–7, 2–6
Winner	14.	19 September 1999	ITF Hopewell, U.S.	Hard	(China) Li Fang	(United States) Dawn Buth (South Africa) Kim Grant	6–3, 6–3
Runner-up	15.	1 May 2001	ITF Dothan, U.S.	Clay	(Slovakia) Gabriela Voleková	(United States) Marissa Irvin (Chinese Taipei) Janet Lee	0–6, 2–6
Winner	16.	14 October 2001	ITF Hallandale Beach, U.S.	Clay	(South Africa) Jessica Steck	(Argentina) Erica Krauth (Argentina) Vanesa Krauth	4–6, 6–2, 6–3
Winner	17.	12 November 2001	ITF Hattiesburg, U.S.	Hard	(United States) Abigail Spears	(Japan) Rika Hiraki (Japan) Nana Miyagi	6–3, 6–1
Runner-up	18.	3 December 2001	ITF West Columbia, U.S.	Hard	(United States) Abigail Spears	(United States) Amanda Augustus (United States) Jennifer Embry	6–0, 3–6, 3–6
Runner-up	19.	3 December 2002	ITF Boynton Beach, U.S.	Clay	(Russia) Lina Krasnoroutskaya	(Hungary) Katalin Marosi (United States) Samantha Reeves	2–6, 6–7
Runner-up	20.	19 October 2003	ITF Sedona, U.S.	Clay	(Paraguay) Rossana de los Ríos	(China) Yan Zi (China) Zheng Jie	6–7^{(2–7)}, 6–7^{(3–7)}
Runner-up	21.	10 November 2003	ITF Eugene, U.S.	Hard	(Belarus) Tatiana Poutchek	(United States) Teryn Ashley (United States) Shenay Perry	6–3, 2–6, 4–6
Runner-up	22.	1 December 2003	ITF Palm Beach Gardens, U.S.	Clay	(Russia) Tatiana Panova	(Hungary) Melinda Czink (Argentina) Erica Krauth	1–6, 2–6
Runner-up	23.	2 June 2008	Internazionale di Roma, Italy	Clay	(Canada) Marie-Ève Pelletier	(Poland) Klaudia Jans (Poland) Alicja Rosolska	3–6, 1–6
Winner	24.	18 January 2009	ITF Boca Raton, U.S.	Clay	(Belarus) Darya Kustova	(United States) Kimberly Couts (Canada) Sharon Fichman	6–4, 6–2
Runner-up	25.	8 February 2009	ITF Rancho Mirage, U.S.	Hard	(Belarus) Darya Kustova	(South Africa) Natalie Grandin (United States) Courtney Nagle	2–6, 6–7^{(6–8)}
Runner-up	26.	27 April 2009	Charlottesville Open, U.S.	Hard	(United States) Angela Haynes	(United States) Carly Gullickson (Australia) Nicole Kriz	5–7, 6–3, [7–10]
Runner-up	27.	10 October 2009	ITF Mexico City	Hard	(Colombia) Karen Castiblanco	(Bolivia) María Fernanda Álvarez Terán (Portugal) Frederica Piedade	3–6, 4–6
Runner-up	28.	8 March 2010	Clearwater Open, U.S.	Hard	(Germany) Laura Siegemund	(China) Xu Yifan (China) Zhou Yimiao	4–6, 4–6
Winner	29.	19 April 2010	ITF Dothan Pro, U.S.	Clay	(Belarus) Anastasiya Yakimova	(Argentina) María Irigoyen (Serbia) Teodora Mirčić	6–4, 6–2
Runner-up	30.	11 October 2010	Classic of Troy, U.S.	Hard	(Germany) Laura Siegemund	(United States) Madison Brengle (United States) Asia Muhammad	2–6, 4–6
