= 2000 Generali Ladies Linz =

- Date: 17–22 October
- Edition: 14th
- Category: Tier II Series
- Draw: 28S / 16D
- Prize money: USD565,000
- Surface: Hard (indoor)
- Location: Linz, Austria
- Venue: Design Center Linz

Champions

Singles
- (United States) Lindsay Davenport

Doubles
- (France) Amélie Mauresmo / (United States) Chanda Rubin
- Linz Open

The 2000 Generali Ladies Linz was the 2000 Tier II WTA Tour tournament of the annually-held Generali Ladies Linz women's tennis tournament. It was the 14th edition of the tournament and was held from 17 October until 22 October 2000 at the Design Center in Linz, Austria. First-seeded Lindsay Davenport won the singles title.

== Finals ==
=== Singles ===
(United States) Lindsay Davenport defeated (United States) Venus Williams, 6–4, 3–6, 6–2.

- It was Davenport's 29th WTA singles title, and third title of the year.

=== Doubles ===
(France) Amélie Mauresmo / (United States) Chanda Rubin defeated (Japan) Ai Sugiyama / (France) Nathalie Tauziat, 6–4, 6–4.

- It was Mauresmo's 1st WTA doubles title. It was Rubin's 10th WTA doubles title, and second of the year. This was their first and only doubles title together as a pair. This was also Rubin's final WTA doubles title.

== Points and prize money ==
=== Point distribution ===
Event	W	F	SF	QF	Round of 16	Round of 32	Q	Q3	Q2	Q1
Singles	195	137	88	49	25	1	11.75	6.75	4	1
Doubles	195	137	88	49	1	—N/a	11.75	—N/a	—N/a	—N/a

=== Prize money ===
Event	W	F	SF	QF	Round of 16	Round of 32	Q3	Q2	Q1
Singles	$95,500	$51,000	$27,300	$14,600	$7,820	$4,175	$2,230	$1,195	$640
Doubles *	$30,000	$16,120	$8,620	$4,610	$2,465	—N/a	—N/a	—N/a	—N/a

_{* per team}

== Singles main draw entrants ==
=== Seeds ===
Country	Player	Rank	Seed
USA	Lindsay Davenport	2	1
USA	Venus Williams	3	2
~~USA~~	~~Monica Seles~~	~~5~~	~~3~~
FRA	Nathalie Tauziat	7	4
USA	Chanda Rubin	14	5
FRA	Amélie Mauresmo	15	6
RUS	Elena Dementieva	19	7
CRO	Silvija Talaja	22	8
SUI	Patty Schnyder	24	9

Rankings are as of 9 October 2000.

=== Other entrants ===
The following players received wildcards into the singles main draw:

- (Croatia) Iva Majoli
- (Austria) Sylvia Plischke
- (Austria) Patricia Wartusch

The following players received entry from the qualifying draw:

- (Czech Republic) Denisa Chládková
- (Slovakia) Karina Habšudová
- (Netherlands) Amanda Hopmans
- (Slovakia) Henrieta Nagyová

The following players received entry as lucky losers:

- (Italy) Silvia Farina Elia
- (Russia) Tatiana Panova

=== Withdrawals ===
==== Before the tournament ====
- (United States) Monica Seles → replaced by (Italy) Silvia Farina Elia
- (United States) Lisa Raymond → replaced by (Russia) Tatiana Panova

==== During the tournament ====
- (Zimbabwe) Cara Black (Personal issues)

=== Retirements ===
- (Austria) Barbara Schett (Right toe infection)
- (Russia) Tatiana Panova (Shoulder injury)

== Doubles main draw entrants ==
=== Seeds ===
Country	Player	Country	Player	Rank	Seed
JPN	Ai Sugiyama	FRA	Nathalie Tauziat	11	1
~~ZIM~~	~~Cara Black~~	~~RUS~~	~~Elena Likhovtseva~~	~~38~~	~~2~~
USA	Nicole Arendt	NED	Manon Bollegraf	51	3
AUT	Barbara Schett	NED	Caroline Vis	55	4

Rankings are as of 9 October 2000.

=== Other entrants ===
The following pair received wildcards into the doubles main draw:

- (Austria) Daniela Kix / (Austria) Jenny Zika

The following pair received entry from the qualifying draw:

- (Luxembourg) Anne Kremer / (Slovakia) Henrieta Nagyová

The following pair received entry as lucky losers:

- (Austria) Sybille Bammer / (Croatia) Maja Palaveršić-Coopersmith
