= Jenny Zika =

Austrian tennis player

- Full name: Jennifer Zika
- Country (sports): Austria
- Born: 22 November 1984 (age 41) Wels, Austria
- Height: 5 ft 10 in (178 cm)
- Plays: Right-handed

Singles
- Highest ranking: No. 656 (12 Nov 2001)

Doubles
- Highest ranking: No. 718 (29 Jul 2002)

Jennifer Zika (born 22 November 1984) is an Austrian former professional tennis player.

Born and raised in Wels, Zika made a WTA Tour main draw appearance as a 15-year old at the Austrian Open in 2000, losing in the first round to Petra Rampre. She had been a top junior player in Austria but only competed briefly on the professional tour, opting instead to attend Duke University, where she featured on the varsity team.

== ITF finals ==
=== Doubles: 1 (0–1) ===
Result	No.	Date	Tournament	Surface	Partner	Opponents	Score
Loss	1.	May 2002	ITF Rijeka, Croatia	Clay	(Austria) Yvonne Meusburger	(Czech Republic) Gabriela Chmelinová (Czech Republic) Dominika Luzarová	3–6, 6–3, 3–6
