= 2011 BGL Luxembourg Open – Singles Qualifying =

This article displays the qualifying draw of the 2011 BGL Luxembourg Open.

== Players ==
=== Seeds ===
1. (Czech Republic) Lucie Hradecká (qualifying competition)
2. (New Zealand) Marina Erakovic (second round, withdrew playing 2011 Generali Ladies Linz Doubles Final)
3. (Germany) Mona Barthel (qualifying competition)
4. (Spain) Silvia Soler-Espinosa (second round)
5. (Greece) Eleni Daniilidou (qualifying competition)
6. (United Kingdom) Heather Watson (first round)
7. (United Kingdom) Anne Keothavong (qualified)
8. (Romania) Alexandra Cadanțu (qualified)

=== Qualifiers ===
1. (United Kingdom) Anne Keothavong
2. (Netherlands) Bibiane Schoofs
3. (Romania) Alexandra Cadanțu
4. (Italy) Karin Knapp

== Qualifying draw ==
=== First qualifier ===
First Round
(Bulgaria) Elitsa Kostova	5	1
(Germany) Nina Zander	7	6
WC	(Luxembourg) Tiffany Cornelius	1	0
(Germany) Nicola Geuer	6	6
(Ukraine) Viktoriya Kutuzova	7	3	4
7	(United Kingdom) Anne Keothavong	5	6	6

Second Round
1	(Czech Republic) Lucie Hradecká	4	6	6
(Germany) Nina Zander	6	4	0
(Germany) Nicola Geuer	3	1
7	(United Kingdom) Anne Keothavong	6	6

Qualifying Competition
1	(Czech Republic) Lucie Hradecká	3	3
7	(United Kingdom) Anne Keothavong	6	6

=== Second qualifier ===
First Round
WC	(Switzerland) Belinda Bencic	1	6	2
WC	(Russia) Yulia Putintseva	6	1	6
(Netherlands) Bibiane Schoofs	6	6
(Belgium) Alison van Uytvanck	2	4
(Netherlands) Kiki Bertens	6	6
6	(United Kingdom) Heather Watson	2	1

Second Round
2	(New Zealand) Marina Erakovic
WC	(Russia) Yulia Putintseva	w/o
(Netherlands) Bibiane Schoofs	6	2
(Netherlands) Kiki Bertens	3	1^{r}

Qualifying Competition
WC	(Russia) Yulia Putintseva	4	2
(Netherlands) Bibiane Schoofs	6	6

=== Third qualifier ===
First Round
(Canada) Aleksandra Wozniak	6	6
(Germany) Annika Beck	3	2
WC	(Luxembourg) Claudine Schaul	0^{r}
(Slovenia) Andreja Klepač	5
WC	(Croatia) Darija Jurak	6	0	1
8	(Romania) Alexandra Cadanțu	3	6	6

Second Round
3	(Germany) Mona Barthel	6	6
(Canada) Aleksandra Wozniak	3	0
(Slovenia) Andreja Klepač	6	4	1
8	(Romania) Alexandra Cadanțu	2	6	6

Qualifying Competition
3	(Germany) Mona Barthel	2	7	4
8	(Romania) Alexandra Cadanțu	6	5	6

=== Fourth qualifier ===
First Round
4	(Spain) Silvia Soler-Espinosa	7^{8}	6
(Germany) Tatjana Malek	6^{6}	1
(United Kingdom) Naomi Broady	6	3	5
(Italy) Karin Knapp	3	6	7
(Bosnia and Herzegovina) Jasmina Tinjić	0	5
(Germany) Laura Siegemund	6	7
(Czech Republic) Sandra Záhlavová	3	2
5	(Greece) Eleni Daniilidou	6	6

Second Round
4	(Spain) Silvia Soler-Espinosa	3	4
(Italy) Karin Knapp	6	6
(Germany) Laura Siegemund	4	6^{1}
5	(Greece) Eleni Daniilidou	6	7^{7}

Qualifying Competition
(Italy) Karin Knapp	6	7
5	(Greece) Eleni Daniilidou	1	5
