= Petra Kvitová's early career =

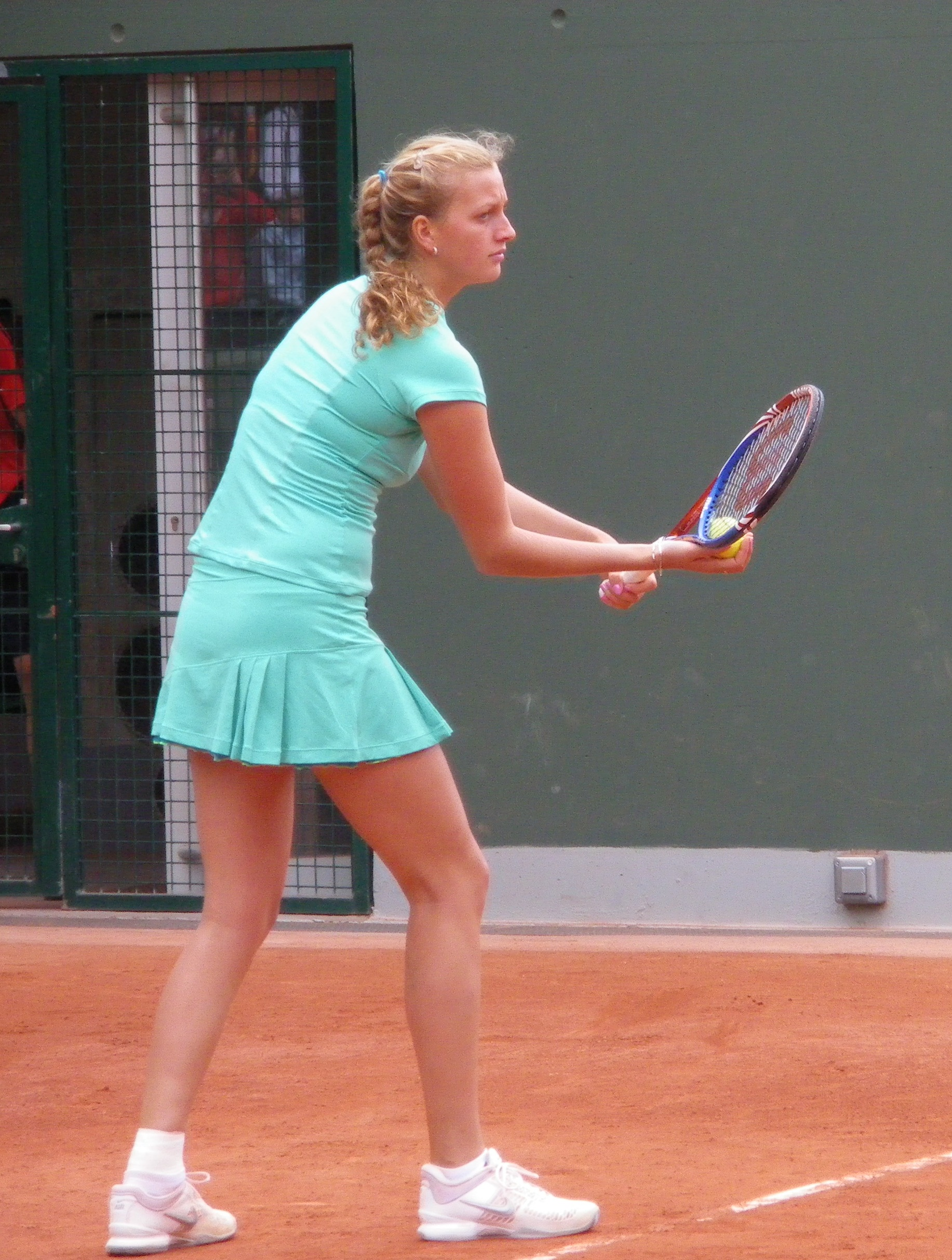
- Kvitová at the 2010 French Open

Singles
- Season record: 141–81 (63.51%)
- Calendar titles: 1
- Year-end ranking: No. 34 (2010)
- Ranking change from previous year: N/A

Grand Slam & significant results
- Australian Open: 2R (2010)
- French Open: 4R (2008)
- Wimbledon: SF (2010)
- US Open: 4R (2009)
- Last updated on: 19 November 2016.

Petra Kvitová first attempted to qualify for her first WTA Tour tournament at the 2007 ECM Prague Open, but she lost in the second round of qualifying to Ekaterina Ivanova. Her first appearance in the main draw of a WTA Tour tournament came at the 2007 Nordea Nordic Light Open, where she lost in the first round to Marta Domachowska in three sets.

After reaching the third round of the girls' tournament of the 2007 Wimbledon Championships, Kvitová tried to qualify for the main draw of the 2007 US Open, but lost in the second round of qualifying to Sandra Klösel. She also lost in the first round of qualifying at the 2008 Australian Open to Nika Ožegović.

Her most significant result before 2011 came at the 2010 Wimbledon Championships, where Kvitová, then ranked world No. 62, reached the semifinals, having never previously won a professional match on grass. She defeated, in order, Sorana Cîrstea, Zheng Jie, Victoria Azarenka, Caroline Wozniacki and qualifier Kaia Kanepi before being defeated by world No. 1, defending and eventual champion Serena Williams in the semi-finals.

== Yearly summary 2008-2010 ==
=== 2008: Grand Slam debut and entering the Top 50 ===
Kvitová started to regularly participate on the WTA Tour in 2008. After failing to qualify for the Australian Open, she qualified for the Open Gaz de France, the Regions Morgan Keegan Championships and the Cellular South Cup and the Sony Ericsson Open in the first quarter of the year, upsetting Anabel Medina Garrigues and defending champion Venus Williams in the first round of the former two tournaments, respectively. Thus, she earned her first two WTA main draw wins, the win over the then-eighth-ranked Williams being her first top 10 win.

Kvitová made her Grand Slam debut at the 2008 French Open, then ranked No. 93 in the world. She lost in the fourth round to Kaia Kanepi in three sets, having defeated Akiko Morigami, Samantha Stosur and then-world No. 13 Ágnes Szávay en route. Later in the year, she reached the quarter-finals of the 2008 Zurich Open, losing there to Ana Ivanovic; this result catapulted her into the world's top fifty for the first time; she would eventually end the year as world no. 44.

=== 2009: First career title ===
Kvitová started 2009 with a first round loss to top seed Ana Ivanovic at the Brisbane International. Following that, she won her first career title at the Moorilla Hobart International, defeating Sally Peers, Alona Bondarenko, Anastasia Pavlyuchenkova and Virginie Razzano before defeating Fed Cup team-mate and good friend Iveta Benešová in the final.

Her Australian Open debut, which followed soon after, ended in a heavy loss at the hands of Victoria Azarenka in the first round. This started a procession of three consecutive losses, which continued into Open GDF Suez, and Dubai, before she was able to reach the third round at Indian Wells, losing there to the eventual champion, Vera Zvonareva, in straight sets.

She withdrew from the 2009 French Open due to an ankle injury and lost in the first round of Wimbledon to Maria Kirilenko, those misfortunes conspiring against her to drop to world no. 69 in the rankings. At the US Open, she defeated then-world no. 1 Dinara Safina in the third round in three sets, before losing to eventual semi-finalist Yanina Wickmayer in the fourth round. Kvitová was ranked 71 places lower than Safina at the time. At the Generali Ladies Linz, Kvitová reached her second final of the year, but lost in straight sets to Wickmayer. She ended the year ranked 62nd in the world.

=== 2010: First Grand Slam semifinal and rise up the rankings ===
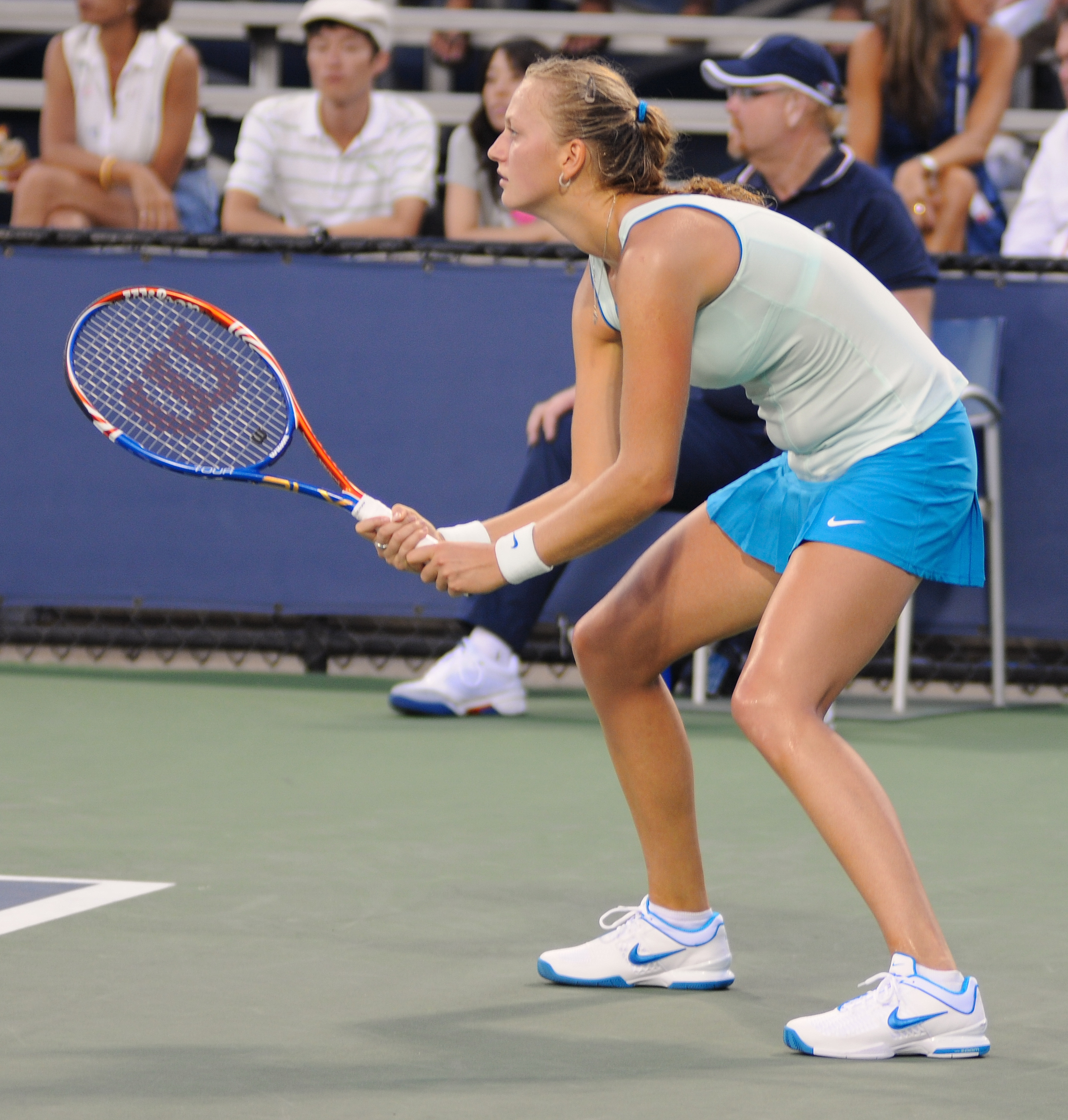
Kvitová at the 2010 US Open

Kvitová's 2010 season did not start well, as she fell in the final round of qualifying to Kirsten Flipkens at the Moorilla Hobart International, where she was the defending champion. At the Australian Open, she fell in the second round to world number one, defending and eventual champion Serena Williams after defeating Jill Craybas in the first.

Shortly after her poor Australian swing, she reached the semifinals of the 2010 Cellular South Cup, losing there to eventual champion Maria Sharapova. She then reached the second round at both Indian Wells and Miami, losing in the latter tournament to eventual champion Kim Clijsters.

To kick off the clay court season, Kvitová upset Vera Zvonareva in the first round in Rome, before losing to Andrea Petkovic in the second round. She then qualified for Madrid the following week, but found herself drawn against top three player Caroline Wozniacki, to whom she lost to in straight sets, in the first round. Her poor clay court season culminated in a first round loss to Sophie Ferguson at the French Open.

Entering Wimbledon later in the year, Kvitová had never won a professional match on grass courts, however, she would defy that record by reaching her first career Grand Slam semi-final at the tournament. Then ranked 62 in the world, she defeated, in order, Sorana Cîrstea, Zheng Jie, Victoria Azarenka, Caroline Wozniacki and Kaia Kanepi before being defeated by world number one, defending and eventual champion Serena Williams in the semi-finals. Her run to the final four guaranteed her a debut in the top 30 in the week starting 5 July 2010.

Following Wimbledon, she failed to reach another top-level quarter-final for the remainder of the year. Including the Wimbledon semi-final loss to Williams, Kvitová endured a six-match losing streak, during which she had five consecutive first-round losses, before ending it by reaching the third round of the US Open (where she was seeded for the first time at a Grand Slam tournament, at 25th), where she lost to defending and eventual champion Kim Clijsters; having led 3–0 in the first set, she lost the next twelve games in a row.

Although Kvitová failed to reach any finals in 2010, she ended the year ranked world no. 34, her first top 40 finish to a season, and was recognised as the WTA Newcomer of the Year.

== Grand Slam performance ==
Year	Tournament	Round	Result	Opponent	Score
2008	French Open	1R	Win	(Japan) Akiko Morigami	6–4, 6–3
2008	French Open	2R	Win	(Australia) Samantha Stosur	6–2, 6–1
2008	French Open	3R	Win	(Hungary) Ágnes Szávay	7–6^{(7–2)}, 4–6, 6–2
2008	French Open	4R	Loss	(Estonia) Kaia Kanepi	3–6, 6–3, 1–6
2008	Wimbledon	1R	Loss	(Ukraine) Tatiana Perebiynis	4–6, 6–0, 4–6
2008	US Open	1R	Loss	(Spain) Virginia Ruano Pascual	7–6^{(7–3)}, 4–6, 2–6
2009	Australian Open	1R	Loss	(Belarus) Victoria Azarenka	2–6, 1–6
2009	Wimbledon	1R	Loss	(Russia) Maria Kirilenko	4–6, 4–6
2009	US Open	1R	Win	(Russia) Alisa Kleybanova	6–7^{(4–7)}, 6–3, 6–2
2009	US Open	2R	Win	(Italy) Tathiana Garbin	6–1, 6–3
2009	US Open	3R	Win	(Russia) Dinara Safina	6–4, 2–6, 7–6^{(7–5)}
2009	US Open	4R	Loss	(Belgium) Yanina Wickmayer	6–4, 4–6, 5–7

Year	Tournament	Round	Result	Opponent	Score
2010	Australian Open	1R	Win	(United States) Jill Craybas	6–1, 7–5
2010	Australian Open	2R	Loss	(United States) Serena Williams	2–6, 1–6
2010	French Open	1R	Loss	(Australia) Sophie Ferguson	6–1, 2–6, 2–6
2010	Wimbledon	1R	Win	(Romania) Sorana Cîrstea	6–2, 6–2
2010	Wimbledon	2R	Win	(China) Zheng Jie	6–4, 2–6, 6–2
2010	Wimbledon	3R	Win	(Belarus) Victoria Azarenka	7–5, 6–0
2010	Wimbledon	4R	Win	(Denmark) Caroline Wozniacki	6–2, 6–0
2010	Wimbledon	QF	Win	(Estonia) Kaia Kanepi	4–6, 7–6^{(10–8)}, 8–6
2010	Wimbledon	SF	Loss	(United States) Serena Williams	6–7^{(5–7)}, 2–6
2010	US Open	1R	Win	(Czech Republic) Lucie Hradecká	6–4, 7–5
2010	US Open	2R	Win	(United Kingdom) Elena Baltacha	7–6^{(7–5)}, 6–3
2010	US Open	3R	Loss	(Belgium) Kim Clijsters	3–6, 0–6

== Yearly records ==
=== Finals ===
==== Singles: 2 (1 title, 1 runner-up) ====
Winner WTA Tour Championships Tier I / Premier Mandatory & Premier 5 Tier II / Premier Tier III, IV & V / International (1–1)	Finals by surface Hard (1–1) Grass Clay Indoor (0–1)

Outcome	No.	Date	Championship	Surface	Opponent	Score
Winner	1.	January 16, 2009	Hobart International Hobart, Australia	Hard	(Czech Republic) Iveta Benešová	7–5, 6–1
Runner-up	1.	October 18, 2009	Ladies Linz, Linz, Austria	Hard (i)	(Belgium) Yanina Wickmayer	3–6, 4–6

== ITF Circuit finals ==
=== Singles: 9 (7–2) ===
$100,000 tournaments
$75,000 tournaments
$50,000 tournaments
$25,000 tournaments
$10,000 tournaments

Outcome	No.	Date	Tournament	Surface	Opponent	Score
Winner	1.	1 October 2006	Szeged, Hungary	Clay	(Hungary) Dorottya Magas	6–1, 6–4
Winner	2.	17 December 2006	Valašské Meziříčí, Czech Republic	Hard	(Czech Republic) Radana Holušová	6–3, 6–4
Winner	3.	21 January 2007	Stuttgart, Germany	Hard	(Germany) Anne Schäfer	6–1, 6–0
Winner	4.	18 February 2007	Prague, Czech Republic	Carpet	(Slovakia) Magdaléna Rybáriková	7–5, 7–6^{(7–2)}
Runner-up	1.	17 June 2007	Zlín, Czech Republic	Clay	(Czech Republic) Klára Zakopalová	4–6, 1–6
Runner-up	2.	28 October 2007	Bratislava, Slovakia	Hard	(Germany) Tatjana Malek	2–6, 6–7^{(7–9)}
Winner	5.	9 December 2007	Přerov, Czech Republic	Hard	(Slovakia) Magdaléna Rybáriková	7–5, 6–3
Winner	6.	16 December 2007	Valašské Meziříčí, Czech Republic	Hard	(Croatia) Ivana Lisjak	6–4, 6–0
Winner	7.	13 April 2008	Monzón, Spain	Hard	(Belgium) Yanina Wickmayer	2–6, 6–4, 7–5

== See also ==
- Petra Kvitová
- Petra Kvitová career statistics
