= 2011 Generali Ladies Linz =

- Date: 10–16 October
- Edition: 25th
- Category: WTA International
- Draw: 32S / 16D
- Prize money: $220,000
- Surface: Hard
- Location: Linz, Austria
- Venue: TipsArena Linz

Champions

Singles
- (Czech Republic) Petra Kvitová

Doubles
- (New Zealand) Marina Erakovic / (Russia) Elena Vesnina
← 2010 ·	Generali Ladies Linz	· 2012 →

The 2011 Generali Ladies Linz was a women's tennis tournament played on indoor hard courts. It was the 25th edition of the Generali Ladies Linz, and part of the WTA International tournaments of the 2011 WTA Tour. It was held at the TipsArena Linz in Linz, Austria, from 10 October until 16 October 2011.

== Finals ==
=== Singles ===
(Czech Republic) Petra Kvitová defeated (Slovakia) Dominika Cibulková, 6–4, 6–1

- It was Kvitová's 5th singles title of the year, and the 6th of her career.

=== Doubles ===
(New Zealand) Marina Erakovic / (Russia) Elena Vesnina defeated (Germany) Julia Görges / (Germany) Anna-Lena Grönefeld, 7–5, 6–1

== Players ==
=== Seeds ===
Country	Player	Rank^{1}	Seed
CZE	Petra Kvitová	5	1
GER	~~Andrea Petkovic~~	~~11~~	~~2~~
SRB	Jelena Janković	13	3
RUS	Anastasia Pavlyuchenkova	16	4
GER	Sabine Lisicki	17	5
GER	Julia Görges	19	6
SVK	Dominika Cibulková	22	7
SVK	Daniela Hantuchová	25	8
ITA	Flavia Pennetta	26	9

- Seeds are based on the rankings of October 3, 2011.

=== Other entrants ===
The following players received wildcards into the singles main draw:

- (Serbia) Jelena Janković
- (Czech Republic) Petra Kvitová
- (Austria) Patricia Mayr-Achleitner

The following players received entry from the qualifying draw:

- (Romania) Sorana Cîrstea
- (Russia) Vitalia Diatchenko
- (France) Stéphanie Foretz Gacon
- (Croatia) Petra Martić

The following players received entry from a lucky loser spot:

- (United Kingdom) Anne Keothavong
- (Russia) Evgeniya Rodina
- (Australia) Anastasia Rodionova

=== Withdrawals ===
The following players withdrew from the tournament:

- (Germany) Andrea Petkovic (right knee injury)
- (Russia) Nadia Petrova (left thigh strain)
- (Argentina) Gisela Dulko (lower back injury)
