= Petra Kvitová career statistics =

Career finals
Discipline	Type	Won	Lost	Total
Singles	Grand Slam	2	1	3
Singles	WTA Finals (Note: Formerly known as WTA Tour Championships until 2014.)	1	1	2
Singles	WTA Elite Trophy (Note: Formerly known as WTA Tournament of Champions until 2015.)	1	–	1
Singles	WTA 1000 (Note: Formerly known as: Tier I (until 2009); WTA Premier Mandatory and 5 (until 2021))	9	4	13
Singles	WTA 500 (Note: Formerly known as: Tier II (until 2009); WTA Premier (until 2021))	14	2	16
Singles	WTA 250 (Note: Formerly known as: Tier III & IV & V (until 2009); WTA International (until 2021))	4	3	7
Singles	Olympics	–	–	0
Singles	Total	31	11	42
Doubles	Grand Slam	–	–	0
Doubles	WTA Finals	–	–	0
Doubles	WTA 1000	–	–	0
Doubles	WTA 500	–	–	0
Doubles	WTA 250	–	–	0
Doubles	Olympics	–	–	0
Doubles	Total	0	0	0

The career of Czech former professional tennis player Petra Kvitová started when she turned professional in 2006 and lasted until her official retirement in 2025. Kvitová has won 31 career singles titles including two Grand Slam titles at the Wimbledon Championships, one WTA Tour Championships title, and nine WTA 1000 singles titles. She was also the bronze medalist at the 2016 Rio Olympics, a runner-up at the 2015 WTA Finals and 2019 Australian Open, semifinalist at the 2010 Wimbledon Championships, 2012 Australian Open, 2012 French Open and 2020 French Open, and a quarterfinalist at the 2011 Australian Open, 2012 Wimbledon Championships, 2013 Wimbledon Championships, 2015 US Open, 2017 US Open and 2020 Australian Open. Kvitová reached her career-high ranking of world No. 2 on 31 October 2011.

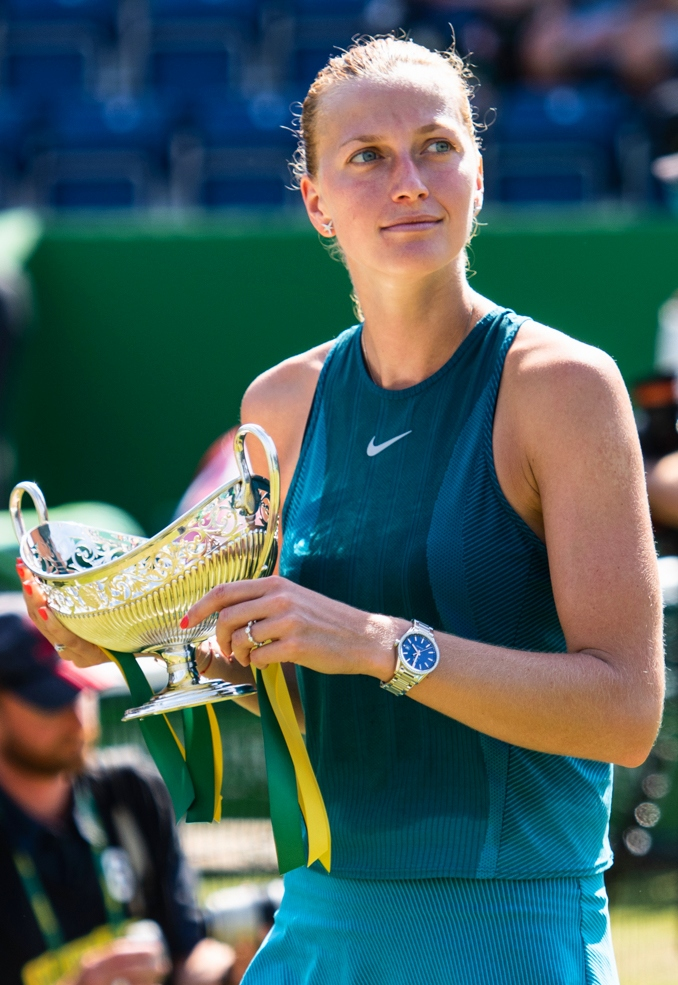
Kvitová in 2018

== Performance timelines ==
Key
W	F	SF	QF	#R	RR	Q#	P#	DNQ	A	Z#	PO	G	S	B	NMS	NTI	P	NH

(W) winner; (F) finalist; (SF) semifinalist; (QF) quarterfinalist; (#R) rounds 4, 3, 2, 1; (RR) round-robin stage; (Q#) qualification round; (P#) preliminary round; (DNQ) did not qualify; (A) absent; (Z#) Davis/Fed Cup Zonal Group (with number indication) or (PO) play-off; (G) gold, (S) silver or (B) bronze Olympic/Paralympic medal; (NMS) not a Masters tournament; (NTI) not a Tier I tournament; (P) postponed; (NH) not held; (SR) strike rate (events won / competed); (W–L) win–loss record.
To avoid confusion and double counting, these charts are updated at the conclusion of a tournament or when the player's participation has ended.

Only main-draw results in WTA Tour, Grand Slam tournaments, Billie Jean King Cup, United Cup, Hopman Cup and Olympic Games are included in win–loss records.

=== Singles ===
Current through the 2025 US Open.

Tournament	2006	2007	2008	2009	2010	2011	2012	2013	2014	2015	2016	2017	2018	2019	2020	2021	2022	2023	2024	2025	SR	W–L	Win %
Grand Slam tournaments
Australian Open	A	A	Q1	1R	2R	QF	SF	2R	1R	3R	2R	A	1R	F	QF	2R	1R	2R	A	A	0 / 14	26–14	65%
French Open	A	A	4R	A	1R	4R	SF	3R	3R	4R	3R	2R	3R	A	SF	2R (Note: Withdrew during the tournament. Not counted as a loss.)	2R	1R	A	1R	0 / 15	30–14	68%
Wimbledon	A	A	1R	1R	SF	W	QF	QF	W	3R	2R	2R	1R	4R	NH	1R	3R	4R	A	1R	2 / 16	38–14	73%
US Open	A	Q2	1R	4R	3R	1R	4R	3R	3R	QF	4R	QF	3R	2R	4R	3R	4R	2R	A	1R	0 / 17	34–17	67%
Win–Loss	0–0	0–0	3–3	3–3	8–4	14–3	17–4	8–4	11–3	11–4	7–4	6–3	4–4	10–3	12–3	4–3	5–4	5–4	0–0	0–3	2 / 61	128–59	68%
Year-end championships
WTA Finals	Did Not Qualify					W	RR	SF	RR	F	DNQ		RR	RR	NH	Did Not Qualify					1 / 7	10–14	42%
WTA Elite Trophy	Not Held			Did Not Qualify							W	DNQ			Not Held			A	Not Held		1 / 1	4–0	100%
National representation
Summer Olympics	Not Held		A	Not Held			QF	Not Held			SF-B	Not Held				2R	Not Held				0 / 3	9–3	75%
Billie Jean King Cup	A	A	PO	SF	SF	W	W	SF	W	W	W	A	W	A	A (Note: Edition is split into the two years due to COVID-19.)		A	A	A	A	6 / 10	30–10	75%
WTA 1000 + former^{†} tournaments
Qatar Open	Not Tier I		A	Not Held		NTI	A	QF	QF	NTI	3R	NTI	W	NTI	F	NTI	2R	NTI	A	A	1 / 6	16–5	68%
Dubai Championships	Not Tier I			1R	A	1R	Not Tier I			3R	NTI		NTI	F	NTI	2R	NTI	3R	A	A	0 / 6	7–6	68%
Indian Wells Open	A	A	A	3R	2R	2R	3R	QF	4R	A	QF	A	3R	2R	NH	3R	3R	QF	A	1R	0 / 13	18–13	58%
Miami Open	A	A	1R	1R	2R	3R	2R	3R	QF	A	3R	A	4R	QF	NH	4R	QF	W	A	1R	1 / 14	23–13	64%
Madrid Open	Not Held			2R	1R	W	2R	2R	SF	W	3R	A	W	QF	NH	QF	1R	2R	A	1R	3 / 14	32–11	74%
Italian Open	A	A	A	A	2R	A	QF	3R	2R	QF	2R	A	A	3R	A	2R	A	A	A	2R	0 / 9	9–8	53%
Canadian Open	A	A	2R	Q2	1R	3R	W	QF	3R	2R	3R	2R	3R	A	NH	3R	1R	3R	A	A	1 / 13	16–12	57%
Cincinnati Open	Not Tier I			Q1	A	3R	SF	3R	2R	2R	A	2R	SF	2R	2R	QF	F	2R	A	A	0 / 12	18–12	60%
Wuhan Open	Not Held								W	3R	W	1R	3R	SF	Not Held				A	A	3 / 6	24–4	77%
China Open	Not Tier I			A	3R	2R	2R	SF	F	1R	QF	SF	1R	QF	Not Held			2R	A	A	0 / 11	18–11	62%
Guadalajara Open^{†}	Not Held																2R	A	Not Tier I		0 / 1	1–1	50%
Pan Pacific Open^{†}	A	A	A	A	1R	SF	2R	W	Not Tier I												0 / 4	16–3	50%
Kremlin Cup^{†}	A	A	Q1	Not Tier I													Not Held				0 / 1	0–0	–
Win–Loss	0–0	0–0	1–2	3–4	5–7	12–7	13–7	19–8	19–8	10–6	17–7	6–4	20–6	16–8	4–2	11–7	11–7	14–6	0–0	1–3	9 / 110	182–99	65%
Career Statistics
	2006	2007	2008	2009	2010	2011	2012	2013	2014	2015	2016	2017	2018	2019	2020	2021	2022	2023	2024	2025	Career		
Tournaments	0	1	14	17	20	17	18	23	19	17	22	11	21	16	7	19	20	15	0	9	Career total: 285		
Titles	0	0	0	1	0	6	2	2	3	3	2	1	5	2	0	1	1	2	0	0	Career total: 31		
Finals	0	0	0	2	0	7	2	4	4	4	3	1	5	4	1	1	2	2	0	0	Career total: 42		
Hard Win–Loss	0–0	0–1	7–8	16–11	12–15	36–9	29–10	36–15	29–12	25–13	36–16	11–8	26–13	26–13	15–5	18–11	19–13	22–10	0–0	0–4	20 / 192	363–187	66%
Clay Win–Loss	0–0	0–0	6–4	3–5	1–5	9–1	10–4	11–6	5–4	11–3	7–4	1–1	15–3	8–2	5–1	8–4	1–4	0–2	0–0	1–2	5 / 60	102–55	65%
Grass Win–Loss	0–0	0–0	0–2	0–1	5–2	11–1	7–3	4–2	9–0	2–1	3–3	6–1	6–1	3–1	0–0	3–2	7–2	8–1	0–0	0–2	6 / 33	74–25	75%
Carpet Win–Loss	0–0	0–0	1–1	2–0	Discontinued																0 / 1	3–1	75%
Overall Win–Loss	0–0	0–1	14–15	21–17	18–22	56–11	46–17	51–23	43–16	38–17	46–23	18–10	47–17	37–16	20–6	29–17	27–19	30–13	0–0	1–8	31 / 286	542–268	67%
Win %	0%	0%	48%	55%	45%	84%	73%	69%	73%	69%	67%	64%	73%	70%	77%	63%	59%	70%	–	13%	Career total: 67%		
Year-end ranking	773	157	44	62	34	2	8	6	4	6	11	29	7	7	8	17	16	14	–	513	$37,653,615		

=== Doubles ===
Current after the season 2016.

Tournament	2007	2008	2009	2010	2011	2012	2013	2014	2015	2016	SR	W–L	Win%
Grand Slam tournaments
Australian Open	A	A	1R	1R	2R	A	A	A	A	A	0 / 3	1–3	25%
French Open	A	A	A	2R	A	A	A	A	A	A	0 / 1	1–1	50%
Wimbledon	A	1R	A	1R	1R	A	A	A	A	A	0 / 3	0–3	0%
US Open	A	1R	1R	1R	A	A	A	A	A	A	0 / 3	0–3	0%
Win–Loss	0–0	0–2	0–2	1–4	1–2	0–0	0–0	0–0	0–0	0–0	0 / 10	2–10	17%
National representation
Summer Olympics	NH	1R	Not Held			A	Not Held			A	0 / 1	0–1	0%
WTA 1000 + former^{†} tournaments
Qatar Open	NTI	A	Not Held		NTI	A	A	A	NTI	2R	0 / 1	1–0	100%
Indian Wells Open	A	A	A	A	A	2R	1R	A	A	2R	0 / 3	2–2	50%
Canadian Open	A	A	A	A	A	A	1R	1R	A	A	0 / 2	0–2	0%
Cincinnati Open	A	A	A	A	A	A	2R	A	A	A	0 / 1	1–0	100%
Pan Pacific Open^{†}	A	A	A	A	A	A	QF	A	A	A	0 / 1	1–0	100%
Career Statistics
Tournaments	0	3	3	4	2	1	7	4	0	3	Career total: 27		
Overall Win–Loss	0–1	0–3	1–3	1–4	1–2	1–0	2–5	0–4	0–0	2–2	0 / 27	8–24	25%
Year-end ranking	454	959	379	333	361	532	260	1250	n/a	265			

=== Mixed doubles ===
Tournament	2011	SR	W–L	Win%
Australian Open	A	0 / 0	0–0	0%
French Open	1R	0 / 1	0–1	0%
Wimbledon	A	0 / 0	0–0	0%
US Open	A	0 / 0	0–0	0%
Win–Loss	0–0	0 / 1	0–1	0%

== Grand Slam tournament finals ==
=== Singles: 3 (2 titles, 1 runner-up) ===
Result	Year	Tournaments	Surface	Opponent	Score
Win	2011	Wimbledon	Grass	(Russia) Maria Sharapova	6–3, 6–4
Win	2014	Wimbledon (2)	Grass	(Canada) Eugenie Bouchard	6–3, 6–0
Loss	2019	Australian Open	Hard	(Japan) Naomi Osaka	6–7^{(2–7)}, 7–5, 4–6

== Other significant finals ==
=== WTA Finals ===
==== Singles: 2 (1 title, 1 runner-up) ====
Result	Year	Tournament	Surface	Opponent	Score
Win	2011	WTA Finals, Istanbul	Hard (i)	(Belarus) Victoria Azarenka	7–5, 4–6, 6–3
Loss	2015	WTA Finals, Singapore	Hard (i)	(Poland) Agnieszka Radwańska	2–6, 6–4, 3–6

=== WTA Elite Trophy ===
==== Singles: 1 (title) ====
Result	Year	Tournament	Surface	Opponent	Score
Win	2016	WTA Elite Trophy, China	Hard (i)	(Ukraine) Elina Svitolina	6–4, 6–2

=== Olympic medal matches ===
==== Singles: 1 (bronze medal) ====
Result	Year	Tournament	Surface	Opponent	Score
Bronze	2016	Rio Olympics, Brazil	Hard	(United States) Madison Keys	7–5, 2–6, 6–2

=== WTA 1000 ===
==== Singles: 13 (9 titles, 4 runner-ups) ====
Result	Year	Tournament	Surface	Opponent	Score
Win	2011	Madrid Open	Clay	(Belarus) Victoria Azarenka	7–6^{(7–3)}, 6–4
Win	2012	Canadian Open	Hard	(China) Li Na	7–5, 2–6, 6–3
Win	2013	Pan Pacific Open	Hard	(Germany) Angelique Kerber	6–2, 0–6, 6–3
Win	2014	Wuhan Open	Hard	(Canada) Eugenie Bouchard	6–3, 6–4
Loss	2014	China Open	Hard	(Russia) Maria Sharapova	4–6, 6–2, 3–6
Win	2015	Madrid Open (2)	Clay	(Russia) Svetlana Kuznetsova	6–1, 6–2
Win	2016	Wuhan Open (2)	Hard	(Slovakia) Dominika Cibulková	6–1, 6–1
Win	2018	Qatar Ladies Open	Hard	(Spain) Garbiñe Muguruza	3–6, 6–3, 6–4
Win	2018	Madrid Open (3)	Clay	(Netherlands) Kiki Bertens	7–6^{(8–6)}, 4–6, 6–3
Loss	2019	Dubai Championships	Hard	(Switzerland) Belinda Bencic	3–6, 6–1, 2–6
Loss	2020	Qatar Ladies Open	Hard	(Belarus) Aryna Sabalenka	3–6, 3–6
Loss	2022	Cincinnati Open	Hard	(France) Caroline Garcia	2–6, 4–6
Win	2023	Miami Open	Hard	(Kazakhstan) Elena Rybakina	7–6^{(16–14)}, 6–2

== WTA Tour finals ==
=== Singles: 42 (31 titles, 11 runner-ups) ===
Legend Grand Slam (2–1) WTA Championships / WTA Finals (1–1) WTA Elite Trophy (1–0) Premier M & Premier 5 / WTA 1000 (9–4) Premier / WTA 500 (14–2) International (4–3)	Titles by surface Hard (20–9) Grass (6–1) Clay (5–1)	Finals by setting Indoor (6–3) Outdoor (25–8)

Result	W–L	Date	Tournament	Tier	Surface	Opponent	Score
Win	1–0	Jan 2009	Hobart International, Australia	International	Hard	(Czech Republic) Iveta Benešová	7–5, 6–1
Loss	1–1	Oct 2009	Linz Open, Austria	International	Hard (i)	(Belgium) Yanina Wickmayer	4–6, 3–6
Win	2–1	Jan 2011	Brisbane International, Australia	International	Hard	(Germany) Andrea Petkovic	6–1, 6–3
Win	3–1	Feb 2011	Open GDF Suez, France	Premier	Hard (i)	(Belgium) Kim Clijsters	6–4, 6–3
Win	4–1	May 2011	Madrid Open, Spain	Premier M	Clay	(Belarus) Victoria Azarenka	7–6^{(7–3)}, 6–4
Loss	4–2	Jun 2011	Eastbourne International, United Kingdom	Premier	Grass	(France) Marion Bartoli	1–6, 6–4, 5–7
Win	5–2	Jul 2011	Wimbledon, United Kingdom	Grand Slam	Grass	(Russia) Maria Sharapova	6–3, 6–4
Win	6–2	Oct 2011	Linz Open, Austria	International	Hard (i)	(Slovakia) Dominika Cibulková	6–4, 6–1
Win	7–2	Oct 2011	WTA Finals, Turkey	Championships	Hard (i)	(Belarus) Victoria Azarenka	7–5, 4–6, 6–3
Win	8–2	Aug 2012	Canadian Open, Canada	Premier 5	Hard	(China) Li Na	7–5, 2–6, 6–3
Win	9–2	Aug 2012	Connecticut Open, United States	Premier	Hard	(Russia) Maria Kirilenko	7–6^{(11–9)}, 7–5
Win	10–2	Feb 2013	Dubai Championships, United Arab Emirates	Premier	Hard	(Italy) Sara Errani	6–2, 1–6, 6–1
Loss	10–3	Apr 2013	Katowice Open, Poland	International	Clay (i)	(Italy) Roberta Vinci	6–7^{(2–7)}, 1–6
Loss	10–4	Aug 2013	Connecticut Open, United States	Premier	Hard	(Romania) Simona Halep	2–6, 2–6
Win	11–4	Oct 2013	Pan Pacific Open, Japan	Premier 5	Hard	(Germany) Angelique Kerber	6–2, 0–6, 6–3
Win	12–4	Jul 2014	Wimbledon, United Kingdom (2)	Grand Slam	Grass	(Canada) Eugenie Bouchard	6–3, 6–0
Win	13–4	Aug 2014	Connecticut Open, United States (2)	Premier	Hard	(Slovakia) Magdaléna Rybáriková	6–4, 6–2
Win	14–4	Sep 2014	Wuhan Open, China	Premier 5	Hard	(Canada) Eugenie Bouchard	6–3, 6–4
Loss	14–5	Oct 2014	China Open, China	Premier M	Hard	(Russia) Maria Sharapova	4–6, 6–2, 3–6
Win	15–5	Jan 2015	Sydney International, Australia	Premier	Hard	(Czech Republic) Karolína Plíšková	7–6^{(7–5)}, 7–6^{(8–6)}
Win	16–5	May 2015	Madrid Open, Spain (2)	Premier M	Clay	(Russia) Svetlana Kuznetsova	6–1, 6–2
Win	17–5	Aug 2015	Connecticut Open, United States (3)	Premier	Hard	(Czech Republic) Lucie Šafářová	6–7^{(6–8)}, 6–2, 6–2
Loss	17–6	Nov 2015	WTA Finals, Singapore	Finals	Hard	(Poland) Agnieszka Radwańska	2–6, 6–4, 3–6
Win	18–6	Oct 2016	Wuhan Open, China (2)	Premier 5	Hard	(Slovakia) Dominika Cibulková	6–1, 6–1
Loss	18–7	Oct 2016	Luxembourg Open, Luxembourg	International	Hard (i)	(Romania) Monica Niculescu	4–6, 0–6
Win	19–7	Nov 2016	WTA Elite Trophy, China	Elite	Hard (i)	(Ukraine) Elina Svitolina	6–4, 6–2
Win	20–7	Jun 2017	Birmingham Classic, United Kingdom	Premier	Grass	(Australia) Ashleigh Barty	4–6, 6–3, 6–2
Win	21–7	Feb 2018	St. Petersburg Ladies Trophy, Russia	Premier	Hard (i)	(France) Kristina Mladenovic	6–1, 6–2
Win	22–7	Feb 2018	Qatar Ladies Open, Qatar	Premier 5	Hard	(Spain) Garbiñe Muguruza	3–6, 6–3, 6–4
Win	23–7	May 2018	Prague Open, Czech Republic	International	Clay	(Romania) Mihaela Buzărnescu	4–6, 6–2, 6–3
Win	24–7	May 2018	Madrid Open, Spain (3)	Premier M	Clay	(Netherlands) Kiki Bertens	7–6^{(8–6)}, 4–6, 6–3
Win	25–7	Jun 2018	Birmingham Classic, United Kingdom (2)	Premier	Grass	(Slovakia) Magdaléna Rybáriková	4–6, 6–1, 6–2
Win	26–7	Jan 2019	Sydney International, Australia (2)	Premier	Hard	(Australia) Ashleigh Barty	1–6, 7–5, 7–6^{(7–3)}
Loss	26–8	Jan 2019	Australian Open, Australia	Grand Slam	Hard	(Japan) Naomi Osaka	6–7^{(2–7)}, 7–5, 4–6
Loss	26–9	Feb 2019	Dubai Championships, United Arab Emirates	Premier 5	Hard	(Switzerland) Belinda Bencic	3–6, 6–1, 2–6
Win	27–9	Apr 2019	Stuttgart Open, Germany	Premier	Clay (i)	(Estonia) Anett Kontaveit	6–3, 7–6^{(7–2)}
Loss	27–10	Feb 2020	Qatar Ladies Open, Qatar	Premier 5	Hard	(Belarus) Aryna Sabalenka	3–6, 3–6
Win	28–10	Mar 2021	Qatar Ladies Open (2)	WTA 500	Hard	(Spain) Garbiñe Muguruza	6–2, 6–1
Win	29–10	Jun 2022	Eastbourne International, United Kingdom	WTA 500	Grass	(Latvia) Jeļena Ostapenko	6–3, 6–2
Loss	29–11	Aug 2022	Cincinnati Open, United States	WTA 1000	Hard	(France) Caroline Garcia	2–6, 4–6
Win	30–11	Mar 2023	Miami Open, United States	WTA 1000	Hard	(Kazakhstan) Elena Rybakina	7–6^{(16–14)}, 6–2
Win	31–11	Jun 2023	Berlin Open, Germany	WTA 500	Grass	(Croatia) Donna Vekić	6–2, 7–6^{(8–6)}

== Team competition finals ==
=== Billie Jean King Cup: 6 (6 titles) ===
Result	W–L	Date	Tournament	Surface	Against	Partners	Opponents in the final	Score
Win	1–0	Nov 2011	Fed Cup, (Note: Formerly known as Fed Cup until 2020.) Russia	Hard (i)	Russia	Lucie Šafářová; Květa Peschke; Lucie Hradecká; Iveta Benešová (Note: Participate in the previous rounds of the edition but not in the final.); Barbora Záhlavová-Strýcová	Anastasia Pavlyuchenkova; Svetlana Kuznetsova; Maria Kirilenko; Elena Vesnina	3–2
Win	2–0	Nov 2012	Fed Cup, Czech Republic (2)	Hard (i)	Serbia	Lucie Šafářová; Lucie Hradecká (Note: Hradecká and Hlaváčková were planned for playing doubles. Since it was obvious that Czech Republic won after leading 3–1, match was cancelled.); Andrea Hlaváčková; Iveta Benešová; Barbora Záhlavová-Strýcová	Ana Ivanovic; Jelena Janković; Bojana Jovanovski; Aleksandra Krunić	3–1
Win	3–0	Nov 2014	Fed Cup, Czech Republic (3)	Hard (i)	Germany	Lucie Šafářová; Lucie Hradecká; Andrea Hlaváčková; Klára Koukalová; Barbora Záhlavová-Strýcová	Angelique Kerber; Andrea Petkovic; Sabine Lisicki; Julia Görges	3–1
Win	4–0	Nov 2015	Fed Cup, Czech Republic (4)	Hard (i)	Russia	Karolína Plíšková; Barbora Strýcová; Lucie Šafářová; Tereza Smitková; Denisa Šátralová	Maria Sharapova; Anastasia Pavlyuchenkova; Elena Vesnina	3–2
Win	5–0	Nov 2016	Fed Cup, France (5)	Hard (i)	France	Karolína Plíšková; Barbora Strýcová; Lucie Hradecká	Caroline Garcia; Kristina Mladenovic; Alizé Cornet	3–2
Win	6–0	Nov 2018	Fed Cup, Czech Republic (6)	Hard (i)	United States	Barbora Strýcová; Kateřina Siniaková; Karolína Plíšková; Lucie Šafářová; Barbora Krejčíková (Note: Krejčíková was planned for playing doubles match alongside Kateřina Siniaková. Since it was obvious that Czech Republic won after leading 3–0, match was cancelled.)	Sofia Kenin; Alison Riske; Danielle Collins; Nicole Melichar	3–0

=== Hopman Cup: 1 (title) ===
Result	Date	Tournament	Surface	Against	Partners	Opponents	Score
Win	Jan 2012	Hopman Cup, Australia	Hard	France	Tomáš Berdych	Marion Bartoli; Richard Gasquet	2–0

== ITF Circuit finals ==
=== Singles: 10 (7 titles, 3 runner-ups) ===
Legend 100K tournaments (0–2) 75K tournaments (1–0) 50K tournaments (0–1) 25K tournaments (4–0) 10K tournaments (2–0)	Titles by surface Hard (5–1) Clay (1–2) Grass (0–0) Carpet (1–0)

Result	W–L	Date	Tournament	Tier	Surface	Opponent	Score
Win	1–0	Oct 2006	ITF Szeged, Hungary	10K	Clay	(Hungary) Dorottya Magas	6–1, 6–4
Win	2–0	Dec 2006	ITF Valašské Meziříčí, Czech Republic	25K	Hard	(Czech Republic) Radana Holušová	6–3, 6–4
Win	3–0	Jan 2007	ITF Stuttgart, Germany	10K	Hard	(Germany) Anne Schäfer	6–1, 6–0
Win	4–0	Feb 2007	ITF Prague, Czech Republic	25K	Carpet	(Slovakia) Magdaléna Rybáriková	7–5, 7–6^{(7–2)}
Loss	4–1	Jun 2007	Zlín Open, Czech Republic	50K	Clay	(Czech Republic) Klára Zakopalová	4–6, 1–6
Loss	4–2	Oct 2007	Bratislava Open, Slovakia	100K	Hard	(Germany) Tatjana Malek	2–6, 6–7^{(7–9)}
Win	5–2	Dec 2007	Přerov Cup, Czech Republic	25K	Hard	(Slovakia) Magdaléna Rybáriková	7–5, 6–3
Win	6–2	Dec 2007	ITF Valašské Meziříčí, Czech Republic	25K	Hard	(Croatia) Ivana Lisjak	6–4, 6–0
Win	7–2	Apr 2008	ITF Monzon, Spain	75K	Hard	(Belgium) Yanina Wickmayer	2–6, 6–4, 7–5
Loss	7–3	May 2011	Prague Open, Czech Republic	100K	Clay	(Slovakia) Magdaléna Rybáriková	3–6, 4–6

== Junior finals ==
=== ITF Circuit ===
==== Singles: 4 (4 titles) ====
Legend
Grade 1 / B1 (2–0)
Grade 2 (1–0)
Grade 3 (0–0)
Grade 4 (1–0)
Grade 5 (0–0)

Result	W–L	Date	Tournament	Tier	Surface	Opponent	Score
Win	1–0	Jul 2006	ITF Prague, Czech Republic	Grade 4	Clay	(Romania) Ioana Ivan	6–3, 6–4
Win	2–0	Sep 2006	ITF Prague, Czech Republic	Grade 2	Clay	(Slovakia) Klaudia Boczová	6–1, 6–4
Win	3–0	Jan 2007	Přerov Cup, Czech Republic	Grade 1	Carpet	(Belgium) Yanina Wickmayer	6–3, 2–1 ret.
Win	4–0	Jun 2007	ITF Roehampton, United Kingdom	Grade 1	Grass	(Bosnia and Herzegovina) Jasmina Tinjić	1–0 ret.

==== Doubles: 4 (1 title, 3 runner-ups) ====
Legend
Grade 1 / B1 (0–2)
Grade 2 (0–1)
Grade 3 (0–0)
Grade 4 (1–0)

Result	W–L	Date	Tournament	Tier	Surface	Partner	Opponents	Score
Win	1–0	Jul 2006	ITF Prague, Czech Republic	Grade 4	Clay	(Czech Republic) Alena Nogolova	(Czech Republic) Karolína Plíšková (Czech Republic) Kristýna Plíšková	7–5, 6–1
Loss	1–1	Sep 2006	ITF Prague, Czech Republic	Grade 2	Clay	(Czech Republic) Dominika Kaňáková	(Slovakia) Klaudia Boczová (Slovakia) Monika Sirilova	4–6, 2–6
Loss	1–2	Jan 2007	ITF Přerov, Czech Republic	Grade 1	Carpet	(Czech Republic) Alena Nogolova	(Germany) Kim-Alice Grajdek (Germany) Syna Kayser	6–3, 5–7, 4–6
Loss	1–3	Jun 2007	ITF Roehampton, United Kingdom	Grade 1	Grass	(Czech Republic) Kateřina Vaňková	(Russia) Ksenia Lykina (Russia) Anastasia Pivovarova	4–6, 1–6

== Fed Cup/Billie Jean King Cup ==
=== Singles: 40 (30–10) ===
Legend
World Group QF/SF/F (29–9)
World Group Play-off (PO) (1–1)

Edition	Round	Date	Location	Against	Surface	Opponent	W/L	Score
2008	WG PO	Apr 2008	Ramat HaSharon (ISR)	Israel	Hard	Shahar Peer	W	2–6, 6–3, 6–0
2008	WG PO	Apr 2008	Ramat HaSharon (ISR)	Israel	Hard	Tzipora Obziler	L	3–6, 4–6
2009	WG QF	Feb 2009	Brno (CZE)	Spain	Carpet (i)	Carla Suárez Navarro	W	6–4, 6–4
2009	WG QF	Feb 2009	Brno (CZE)	Spain	Carpet (i)	Nuria Llagostera Vives	W	6–4, 7–5
2009	WG SF	Apr 2009	Brno (CZE)	United States	Hard (i)	Bethanie Mattek-Sands	W	6–3, 7–6^{(7–2)}
2009	WG SF	Apr 2009	Brno (CZE)	United States	Hard (i)	Alexa Glatch	L	2–6, 1–6
2010	WG QF	Feb 2010	Brno (CZE)	Germany	Hard (i)	Andrea Petkovic	W	6–4, 6–4
2010	WG QF	Feb 2010	Brno (CZE)	Germany	Hard (i)	Anna-Lena Grönefeld	L	6–4, 3–6, 2–6
2010	WG SF	Apr 2010	Rome (ITA)	Italy	Clay	Flavia Pennetta	L	6–7^{(3–7)}, 2–6
2011	WG QF	Feb 2011	Bratislava (SVK)	Slovakia	Hard (i)	Dominika Cibulková	W	6–2, 6–3
2011	WG QF	Feb 2011	Bratislava (SVK)	Slovakia	Hard (i)	Daniela Hantuchová	W	6–4, 6–2
2011	WG SF	Apr 2011	Charleroi (BEL)	Belgium	Hard (i)	Kirsten Flipkens	W	6–2, 7–6^{(7–4)}
2011	WG SF	Apr 2011	Charleroi (BEL)	Belgium	Hard (i)	Yanina Wickmayer	W	5–7, 6–4, 6–2
2011	WG F	Nov 2011	Moscow (RUS)	Russia	Hard (i)	Maria Kirilenko	W	6–2, 6–2
2011	WG F	Nov 2011	Moscow (RUS)	Russia	Hard (i)	Svetlana Kuznetsova	W	4–6, 6–2, 6–3
2012	WG QF	Feb 2012	Stuttgart (GER)	Germany	Hard (i)	Julia Görges	W	3–6, 6–3, 10–8
2012	WG QF	Feb 2012	Stuttgart (GER)	Germany	Hard (i)	Sabine Lisicki	W	6–7^{(2–7)}, 6–4, 6–1
2012	WG SF	Apr 2012	Ostrava (CZE)	Italy	Hard (i)	Sara Errani	W	6–4, 6–3
2012	WG SF	Apr 2012	Ostrava (CZE)	Italy	Hard (i)	Francesca Schiavone	W	6–4, 7–6^{(7–1)}
2012	WG F	Nov 2012	Prague (CZE)	Serbia	Hard (i)	Jelena Janković	W	6–4, 6–1
2012	WG F	Nov 2012	Prague (CZE)	Serbia	Hard (i)	Ana Ivanovic	L	3–6, 5–7
2013	WG QF	Feb 2013	Ostrava (CZE)	Australia	Hard (i)	Jarmila Gajdošová	W	7–6^{(7–2)}, 6–3
2013	WG QF	Feb 2013	Ostrava (CZE)	Australia	Hard (i)	Samantha Stosur	W	2–6, 7–6^{(7–3)}, 6–4
2013	WG SF	Apr 2013	Palermo (ITA)	Italy	Clay	Roberta Vinci	L	4–6, 1–6
2013	WG SF	Apr 2013	Palermo (ITA)	Italy	Clay	Sara Errani	W	2–6, 6–2, 6–0
2014	WG SF	Apr 2014	Ostrava (CZE)	Italy	Hard (i)	Camila Giorgi	W	6–4, 6–2
2014	WG SF	Apr 2014	Ostrava (CZE)	Italy	Hard (i)	Roberta Vinci	W	6–3, 7–5
2014	WG F	Nov 2014	Prague (CZE)	Germany	Hard (i)	Andrea Petkovic	W	6–2, 6–4
2014	WG F	Nov 2014	Prague (CZE)	Germany	Hard (i)	Angelique Kerber	W	7–6^{(7–5)}, 4–6, 6–4
2015	WG SF	Apr 2015	Ostrava (CZE)	France	Hard (i)	Kristina Mladenovic	W	6–3, 6–4
2015	WG SF	Apr 2015	Ostrava (CZE)	France	Hard (i)	Caroline Garcia	W	6–4, 6–4
2015	WG F	Nov 2015	Prague (CZE)	Russia	Hard (i)	Anastasia Pavlyuchenkova	W	2–6, 6–1, 6–1
2015	WG F	Nov 2015	Prague (CZE)	Russia	Hard (i)	Maria Sharapova	L	6–3, 4–6, 2–6
2016	WG QF	Feb 2016	Cluj-Napoca (ROU)	Romania	Hard (i)	Monica Niculescu	L	3–6, 4–6
2016	WG QF	Feb 2016	Cluj-Napoca (ROU)	Romania	Hard (i)	Simona Halep	L	4–6, 6–3, 3–6
2016	WG F	Nov 2016	Strasbourg (FRA)	France	Hard (i)	Caroline Garcia	L	6–7^{(6–8)}, 3–6
2018	WG QF	Feb 2018	Prague (CZE)	Switzerland	Hard (i)	Viktorija Golubic	W	6–2, 1–6, 6–3
2018	WG QF	Feb 2018	Prague (CZE)	Switzerland	Hard (i)	Belinda Bencic	W	6–2, 6–4
2018	WG SF	Apr 2018	Stuttgart (GER)	Germany	Clay (i)	Julia Görges	W	6–3, 6–2
2018	WG SF	Apr 2018	Stuttgart (GER)	Germany	Clay (i)	Angelique Kerber	W	6–2, 6–2

=== Doubles: 1 (0–1) ===
Legend
World Group QF/SF/F (0–0)
World Group Play-off (PO) (0–1)

Edition	Round	Date	Location	Partnering	Against	Surface	Opponent	W/L	Score
2007	WG PO	Jul 2007	Palafrugell (ESP)	Barbora Záhlavová-Strýcová	Spain	Clay	Nuria Llagostera Vives; Virginia Ruano Pascual	L	4–6, 1–6

== WTA ranking ==
Legend
World No. 1
World No. 2
World No. 3
World No. 4–10
Others

Current after the 2025 US Open.

Year	2006	2007	2008	2009	2010	2011	2012	2013	2014	2015	2016	2017	2018	2019	2020	2021	2022	2023	2024	2025
High	451	150	44	40	29	2	2	6	3	2	6	11	4	2	7	8	16	8	17	504
Low	789	450	153	72	77	34	8	11	9	6	16	29	29	8	12	19	34	16	444	1448
End	773	157	44	62	34	2	8	6	4	6	11	29	7	7	8	17	16	14	N/A	513

== WTA Tour career earnings ==
Current after the 2025 US Open.

Year	Grand Slam singles titles	WTA singles titles	Total singles titles	Earnings ($)	Money list rank
2006–07	0	0	0	41,371	–
2008	0	0	0	218,750	84
2009	0	1	1	259,301	77
2010	0	0	0	647,508	32
2011	1	5	6	5,145,943	1
2012	0	2	2	2,732,875	6
2013	0	2	2	2,853,474	8
2014	1	2	3	5,203,236	3
2015	0	3	3	3,288,722	7
2016	0	2	2	2,500,516	9
2017	0	1	1	1,149,122	33
2018	0	5	5	3,301,389	9
2019	0	2	2	3,724,430	10
2020	0	0	0	1,505,967	7
2021	0	1	1	847,988	37
2022	0	1	1	1,343,059	24
2023	0	2	2	2,488,381	9
2025	0	0	0	399,803	138
Career	2	29	31	37,653,615	8

== Career Grand Slam statistics ==
=== Grand Slam tournament seedings ===
The tournaments won by Kvitová are in boldface, and advanced into finals by Kvitová are in italics.

Year	Australian Open	French Open	Wimbledon	US Open
2007	did not play	did not play	did not play	did not qualify
2008	did not qualify	not seeded	not seeded	not seeded
2009	not seeded	did not play	not seeded	not seeded
2010	not seeded	not seeded	not seeded	27th
2011	25th	9th	**8th (1)**	5th
2012	2nd	4th	4th	5th
2013	8th	7th	8th	7th
2014	6th	5th	**6th (2)**	3rd
2015	4th	4th	2nd	5th
2016	6th	10th	10th	14th
2017	did not play	15th	11th	13th
2018	27th	8th	8th	5th
2019	8th (1)	did not play	6th	6th
2020	7th	7th	cancelled	6th
2021	9th	11th	10th	10th
2022	20th	32nd	25th	21st
2023	15th	10th	9th	11th
2025	did not play	not seeded	not seeded	not seeded

=== Best Grand Slam results details ===
Grand Slam winners are in boldface, and runner–ups are in italics.

Australian Open
2019 Australian Open (8th seed)
Round	Opponent	Rank	Score
1R	(Slovakia) Magdaléna Rybáriková	51	6–3, 6–2
2R	(Romania) Irina-Camelia Begu	70	6–1, 6–3
3R	(Switzerland) Belinda Bencic	49	6–1, 6–4
4R	(United States) Amanda Anisimova	87	6–1, 6–2
QF	(Australia) Ashleigh Barty (15)	15	6–1, 6–4
SF	(United States) Danielle Collins	35	7–6^{(7–2)}, 6–0
F	(Japan) Naomi Osaka (4)	4	6–7^{(2–7)}, 7–5, 4–6

Wimbledon Championships
2011 Wimbledon Championships (8th seed)
Round	Opponent	Rank	Score
1R	(United States) Alexa Glatch [Q]	173	6–2, 6–2
2R	(United Kingdom) Anne Keothavong	111	6–2, 6–1
3R	(Italy) Roberta Vinci [29]	29	6–3, 6–3
4R	(Belgium) Yanina Wickmayer [19]	19	6–0, 6–2
QF	(Bulgaria) Tsvetana Pironkova [32]	33	6–3, 6–7^{(5–7)}, 6–2
SF	(Belarus) Victoria Azarenka [4]	5	6–1, 3–6, 6–2
**W**	(Russia) Maria Sharapova [5]	6	6–3, 6–4
2014 Wimbledon Championships (6th seed)
Round	Opponent	Rank	Score
1R	(Czech Republic) Andrea Hlaváčková	118	6–3, 6–0
2R	(Germany) Mona Barthel	59	6–2, 6–0
3R	(United States) Venus Williams [30]	31	5–7, 7–6^{(7–2)}, 7–5
4R	(China) Peng Shuai	61	6–3, 6–2
QF	(Czech Republic) Barbora Strýcová	43	6–1, 7–5
SF	(Czech Republic) Lucie Šafářová [23]	23	7–6^{(8–6)}, 6–1
**W**	(Canada) Eugenie Bouchard [13]	13	6–3, 6–0

French Open
2012 French Open (4th seed)
Round	Opponent	Rank	Score
1R	(Australia) Ashleigh Barty [WC]	332	6–1, 6–2
2R	(Poland) Urszula Radwańska	79	6–1, 6–3
3R	(Russia) Nina Bratchikova	109	6–2, 4–6, 6–1
4R	(United States) Varvara Lepchenko	63	6–2, 6–1
QF	(Kazakhstan) Yaroslava Shvedova [Q]	142	3–6, 6–2, 6–4
SF	(Russia) Maria Sharapova [2]	2	3–6, 3–6
2020 French Open (7th seed)
Round	Opponent	Rank	Score
1R	(France) Océane Dodin	118	6–3, 7–5
2R	(Italy) Jasmine Paolini	94	6–3, 6–3
3R	(Canada) Leylah Annie Fernandez	100	7–5, 6–3
4R	(China) Zhang Shuai	39	6–2, 6–4
QF	(Germany) Laura Siegemund	66	6–3, 6–3
SF	(United States) Sofia Kenin [4]	6	4–6, 5–7

US Open
2015 US Open (5th seed)
Round	Opponent	Rank	Score
1R	(Germany) Laura Siegemund [Q]	126	6–1, 6–1
2R	(United States) Nicole Gibbs [WC]	117	6–3, 6–4
3R	(Slovakia) Anna Karolína Schmiedlová [32]	32	6–2, 6–1
4R	(United Kingdom) Johanna Konta [Q]	97	7–5, 6–3
QF	(Italy) Flavia Pennetta [26]	26	6–4, 4–6, 2–6
2017 US Open (13th seed)
Round	Opponent	Rank	Score
1R	(Serbia) Jelena Janković	68	7–5, 7–5
2R	(France) Alizé Cornet	46	6–1, 6–2
3R	(France) Caroline Garcia [18]	19	6–0, 6–4
4R	(Spain) Garbiñe Muguruza [3]	3	7–6^{(7–3)}, 6–3
QF	(United States) Venus Williams [9]	9	3–6, 6–3, 6–7^{(2–7)}

== Wins against top 10 players ==
- Kvitová has a 64–72 (47%) record against players who were, at the time the match was played, ranked in the top 10.

#	Opponent	Rk	Event	Surface	Rd	Score	Rk		Ref
1.	(United States) Venus Williams	8	U.S. National Indoors, United States	Hard (i)	1R	2–6, 6–4, 6–3	143	2008	
2.	(Russia) Dinara Safina	1	US Open, United States	Hard	3R	6–4, 2–6, 7–6^{(7–5)}	72	2009	
3.	(Poland) Agnieszka Radwańska	10	Linz Open, Austria	Hard (i)	SF	6–3, 6–2	55	2009	
4.	(Denmark) Caroline Wozniacki	4	Wimbledon, United Kingdom	Grass	4R	6–2, 6–0	62	2010	
5.	(Australia) Samantha Stosur	6	Australian Open, Australia	Hard	3R	7–6^{(7–5)}, 6–3	28	2011	
6.	(Belgium) Kim Clijsters	2	Open GDF Suez, France	Hard (i)	F	6–4, 6–3	18	2011	
7.	(Russia) Vera Zvonareva	3	Madrid Open, Spain	Clay	3R	6–1, 6–4	18	2011	
8.	(China) Li Na	6	Madrid Open, Spain	Clay	SF	6–3, 6–1	18	2011	
9.	(Belarus) Victoria Azarenka	5	Madrid Open, Spain	Clay	F	7–6^{(7–3)}, 6–4	18	2011	
10.	(Belarus) Victoria Azarenka	5	Wimbledon, United Kingdom	Grass	SF	6–1, 3–6, 6–2	8	2011	
11.	(Russia) Maria Sharapova	6	Wimbledon, United Kingdom	Grass	F	6–3, 6–4	8	2011	
12.	(Russia) Maria Sharapova	2	Pan Pacific Open, Japan	Hard	QF	4–3 ret.	6	2011	
13.	(Russia) Vera Zvonareva	6	WTA Finals, Turkey	Hard (i)	RR	6–2, 6–4	3	2011	
14.	(Denmark) Caroline Wozniacki	1	WTA Finals, Turkey	Hard (i)	RR	6–4, 6–2	3	2011	
15.	(Poland) Agnieszka Radwańska	8	WTA Finals, Turkey	Hard (i)	RR	7–6^{(7–4)}, 6–3	3	2011	
16.	(Australia) Samantha Stosur	7	WTA Finals, Turkey	Hard (i)	SF	5–7, 6–3, 6–3	3	2011	
17.	(Belarus) Victoria Azarenka	4	WTA Finals, Turkey	Hard (i)	F	7–5, 4–6, 6–3	3	2011	
18.	(France) Marion Bartoli	10	Canadian Open, Canada	Hard	3R	6–1, 6–1	6	2012	
19.	(Denmark) Caroline Wozniacki	8	Canadian Open, Canada	Hard	SF	3–6, 6–2, 6–3	6	2012	
20.	(Italy) Sara Errani	10	Connecticut Open, United States	Hard	SF	6–1, 6–3	5	2012	
21.	(Australia) Samantha Stosur	9	Billie Jean King Cup, Czech Republic	Hard (i)	QF	2–6, 7–6^{(7–3)}, 6–4	8	2013	
22.	(Poland) Agnieszka Radwańska	4	Dubai Championships, UAE	Hard	QF	6–2, 6–4	8	2013	
23.	(Denmark) Caroline Wozniacki	10	Dubai Championships, UAE	Hard	SF	6–3, 6–4	8	2013	
24.	(Italy) Sara Errani	7	Dubai Championships, UAE	Hard	F	6–2, 1–6, 6–1	8	2013	
25.	(Italy) Sara Errani	7	Billie Jean King Cup, Italy	Clay	SF	2–6, 6–2, 6–0	8	2013	
26.	(Germany) Angelique Kerber	9	Pan Pacific Open, Japan	Hard	F	6–2, 0–6, 6–3	11	2013	
27.	(Italy) Sara Errani	6	China Open, China	Hard	3R	6–4, 6–7^{(3–7)}, 6–3	7	2013	
28.	(China) Li Na	5	China Open, China	Hard	QF	4–6, 6–2, 6–4	7	2013	
29.	(Poland) Agnieszka Radwańska	4	WTA Finals, Turkey	Hard (i)	RR	6–4, 6–4	6	2013	
30.	(Germany) Angelique Kerber	9	WTA Finals, Turkey	Hard (i)	RR	6–7^{(3–7)}, 6–2, 6–3	6	2013	
31.	(Canada) Eugenie Bouchard	9	Wuhan Open, China	Hard	F	6–3, 6–4	3	2014	
32.	(Russia) Maria Sharapova	2	WTA Finals, Singapore	Hard (i)	RR	6–3, 6–2	3	2014	
33.	(Germany) Angelique Kerber	10	Billie Jean King Cup, Czech Republic	Hard (i)	F	7–6^{(7–5)}, 4–6, 6–4	4	2014	
34.	(United States) Serena Williams	1	Madrid Open, Spain	Clay	SF	6–2, 6–3	4	2015	
35.	(Denmark) Caroline Wozniacki	4	Connecticut Open, United States	Hard	SF	7–5, 6–1	5	2015	
36.	(Czech Republic) Lucie Šafářová	6	Connecticut Open, United States	Hard	F	6–7^{(6–8)}, 6–2, 6–2	5	2015	
37.	(Czech Republic) Lucie Šafářová	9	WTA Finals, Singapore	Hard (i)	RR	7–5, 7–5	5	2015	
38.	(Russia) Maria Sharapova	4	WTA Finals, Singapore	Hard (i)	SF	6–3, 7–6^{(7–3)}	5	2015	
39.	(Spain) Garbiñe Muguruza	4	Stuttgart Open, Germany	Clay (i)	QF	6–1, 3–6, 6–0	7	2016	
40.	(United States) Madison Keys	9	Summer Olympics, Brazil	Hard	SF-B	7–5, 2–6, 6–2	14	2016	
41.	(Germany) Angelique Kerber	1	Wuhan Open, China	Hard	3R	6–7^{(10–12)}, 7–5, 6–4	16	2016	
42.	(Romania) Simona Halep	5	Wuhan Open, China	Hard	SF	6–1, 6–2	16	2016	
43.	(Spain) Garbiñe Muguruza	4	China Open, China	Hard	3R	6–1, 6–4	11	2016	
44.	(Spain) Garbiñe Muguruza	3	US Open, United States	Hard	4R	7–6^{(7–3)}, 6–3	14	2017	
45.	(Denmark) Caroline Wozniacki	6	China Open, China	Hard	3R	6–1, 6–4	18	2017	
46.	(Latvia) Jeļena Ostapenko	6	St. Petersburg Open, Russia	Hard (i)	QF	6–0, 6–2	29	2018	
47.	(France) Kristina Mladenovic	10	St. Petersburg Open, Russia	Hard (i)	F	6–1, 6–2	29	2018	
48.	(Ukraine) Elina Svitolina	3	Qatar Open, Qatar	Hard	3R	6–4, 7–5	21	2018	
49.	(Germany) Julia Görges	10	Qatar Open, Qatar	Hard	QF	6–4, 2–1 ret.	21	2018	
50.	(Denmark) Caroline Wozniacki	1	Qatar Open, Qatar	Hard	SF	3–6, 7–6^{(7–3)}, 7–5	21	2018	
51.	(Spain) Garbiñe Muguruza	4	Qatar Open, Qatar	Hard	F	3–6, 6–3, 6–4	21	2018	
52.	(Czech Republic) Karolína Plíšková	6	Madrid Open, Spain	Clay	SF	7–6^{(7–4)}, 6–3	10	2018	
53.	(Germany) Angelique Kerber	2	Sydney International, Australia	Hard	QF	6–4, 6–1	8	2019	
54.	(Netherlands) Kiki Bertens	7	Stuttgart Open, Germany	Clay (i)	SF	7–6^{(7–3)}, 3–6, 6–1	3	2019	
55.	(Switzerland) Belinda Bencic	10	China Open, China	Hard	3R	6–3, 6–3	7	2019	
56.	(Australia) Ashleigh Barty	1	Qatar Open, Qatar	Hard	SF	6–4, 2–6, 6–4	11	2020	
57.	(Belarus) Aryna Sabalenka	2	Dubai Championships, UAE	Hard	2R	6–4, 6–4	25	2022	
58.	(Tunisia) Ons Jabeur	5	Cincinnati Open, United States	Hard	3R	6–1, 4–6, 6–0	28	2022	
59.	(Spain) Garbiñe Muguruza	10	US Open, United States	Hard	3R	5–7, 6–3, 7–6^{(12–10)}	21	2022	
60.	(Spain) Paula Badosa	4	Ostrava Open, Czech Republic	Hard (i)	2R	7–6^{(7–4)}, 6–4	20	2022	
61.	(United States) Jessica Pegula	3	United Cup, Australia	Hard	RR	7–6^{(8–6)}, 6–4	16	2023	
62.	(United States) Jessica Pegula	3	Indian Wells Open, United States	Hard	4R	6–2, 3–6, 7–6^{(13–11)}	15	2023	
63.	(Kazakhstan) Elena Rybakina	7	Miami Open, United States	Hard	F	7–6^{(16–14)}, 6–2	12	2023	
64.	(France) Caroline Garcia	4	German Open, Germany	Grass	QF	6–4, 7–6^{(7–3)}	9	2023	

- Key: (Rk) first use, opponent rank; (Rd) round; (Rk) 2nd use, player rank; (Ref) reference; (F) final; (SF) semifinal; (QF) quarterfinal; (#R) rounds 4, 3, 2, 1; (RR) round-robin stage; (Q#) qualifying rounds or stages (3), 2, 1.

== Double bagel matches (6–0, 6–0) ==
Result	W–L	Year	Tournament	Tier	Surface	Opponent	Rank	Rd	PKR
Win	1–0	2009	Hobart International, Australia	International	Hard	(Australia) Sally Peers	No. 468	1R	No. 49
Win	2–0	2016	Stuttgart Open, Germany	Premier	Clay (i)	(United States) Louisa Chirico	No. 121	1R	No. 7

== Longest winning streaks ==
=== 14 match win streak (2011–2012) ===
#	Match	Tournament	Category	Start date	Surface	Rd	Opponent	Rank	Score
–	283	China Open	Premier Mandatory	1 October 2011	Hard	2R	(Sweden) Sofia Arvidsson	No. 85	6–7^{(6–8)}, 6–4, 3–6
1	284	Linz Open	International	10 October 2011	Hard (i)	1R	(Canada) Rebecca Marino	No. 59	6–2, 6–2
2	285	Linz Open	International	10 October 2011	Hard (i)	2R	(Austria) Patricia Mayr-Achleitner	No. 105	6–2, 6–3
3	286	Linz Open	International	10 October 2011	Hard (i)	QF	(Slovakia) Daniela Hantuchová	No. 25	6–2, 6–2
4	287	Linz Open	International	10 October 2011	Hard (i)	SF	(Serbia) Jelena Janković	No. 13	4–6, 6–4, 6–3
5	288	Linz Open	International	10 October 2011	Hard (i)	F	(Slovakia) Dominika Cibulková	No. 23	6–4, 6–1
6	289	WTA Tour Championships	WTA Finals	25 October 2011	Hard (i)	RR	(Russia) Vera Zvonareva	No. 6	6–2, 6–4
7	290	WTA Tour Championships	WTA Finals	25 October 2011	Hard (i)	RR	(Denmark) Caroline Wozniacki	No. 1	6–4, 6–2
8	291	WTA Tour Championships	WTA Finals	25 October 2011	Hard (i)	RR	(Poland) Agnieszka Radwańska	No. 8	7–6^{(7–4)}, 6–3
9	292	WTA Tour Championships	WTA Finals	25 October 2011	Hard (i)	SF	(Australia) Samantha Stosur	No. 7	5–7, 6–3, 6–3
10	293	WTA Tour Championships	WTA Finals	25 October 2011	Hard (i)	F	(Belarus) Victoria Azarenka	No. 4	7–5, 4–6, 6–3
11	294	Fed Cup	Team Event	5 November 2011	Hard (i)	–	(Russia) Maria Kirilenko	No. 27	6–2, 6–2
12	295	Fed Cup	Team Event	5 November 2011	Hard (i)	–	(Russia) Svetlana Kuznetsova	No. 19	4–6, 6–2, 6–3
13	296	Sydney International	Premier	8 January 2012	Hard	2R	(Romania) Alexandra Dulgheru	No. 66	7–5, 3–6, 6–4
14	297	Sydney International	Premier	8 January 2012	Hard	QF	(Slovakia) Daniela Hantuchová	No. 21	6–0, 6–4
–	298	Sydney International	Premier	8 January 2012	Hard	SF	(China) Li Na	No. 5	6–1, 5–7, 2–6

=== 14 match win streak (2018) ===
#	Match	Tournament	Category	Start date	Surface	Rd	Opponent	Rank	Score
–	646	Australian Open	Grand Slam	15 January 2018	Hard	1R	(Germany) Andrea Petkovic	No. 98	3–6, 6–4, 8–10
1	647	St. Petersburg Trophy	Premier	29 January 2018	Hard (i)	1R	(Russia) Elena Vesnina	No. 21	6–2, 6–0
2	648	St. Petersburg Trophy	Premier	29 January 2018	Hard (i)	2R	(Romania) Irina-Camelia Begu	No. 37	6–3, 1–6, 6–1
3	649	St. Petersburg Trophy	Premier	29 January 2018	Hard (i)	QF	(Latvia) Jeļena Ostapenko	No. 6	6–0, 6–2
4	650	St. Petersburg Trophy	Premier	29 January 2018	Hard (i)	SF	(Germany) Julia Görges	No. 12	7–5, 4–6, 6–2
5	651	St. Petersburg Trophy	Premier	29 January 2018	Hard (i)	F	(France) Kristina Mladenovic	No. 10	6–1, 6–2
6	652	Fed Cup	Team Event	10 February 2018	Hard (i)	–	(Switzerland) Viktorija Golubic	No. 100	6–2, 1–6, 6–3
7	653	Fed Cup	Team Event	10 February 2018	Hard (i)	–	(Switzerland) Belinda Bencic	No. 73	6–2, 6–4
8	654	Qatar Open	Premier 5	12 February 2018	Hard	1R	(Turkey) Çağla Büyükakçay	No. 160	6–0, 6–3
9	655	Qatar Open	Premier 5	12 February 2018	Hard	2R	(Poland) Agnieszka Radwańska	No. 33	6–7^{(3–7)}, 6–3, 6–4
10	656	Qatar Open	Premier 5	12 February 2018	Hard	3R	(Ukraine) Elina Svitolina	No. 3	6–4, 7–5
11	657	Qatar Open	Premier 5	12 February 2018	Hard	QF	(Germany) Julia Görges	No. 10	6–4, 2–1 ret.
12	658	Qatar Open	Premier 5	12 February 2018	Hard	SF	(Denmark) Caroline Wozniacki	No. 1	3–6, 7–6^{(7–3)}, 7–5
13	659	Qatar Open	Premier 5	12 February 2018	Hard	F	(Spain) Garbiñe Muguruza	No. 4	3–6, 6–3, 6–4
14	660	Indian Wells Open	Premier Mandatory	5 March 2018	Hard	2R	(Kazakhstan) Yulia Putintseva	No. 81	6–7^{(4–7)}, 7–6^{(7–3)}, 6–4
–	661	Indian Wells Open	Premier Mandatory	5 March 2018	Hard	3R	(United States) Amanda Anisimova	No. 149	2–6, 4–6
