= 2013 Generali Ladies Linz – Doubles =

Doubles
- 2013 Generali Ladies Linz

Final
- Champions: (Czech Republic) Karolína Plíšková (Czech Republic) Kristýna Plíšková
- Runners-up: (Canada) Gabriela Dabrowski (Poland) Alicja Rosolska
- Score: 7–6^{(8–6)}, 6–4

Details
- Draw: 16
- Seeds: 4

Events
Singles	Doubles
← 2012 ·	Linz Open	· 2014 →

Anna-Lena Grönefeld and Květa Peschke were the defending champions, but chose not to participate.
Karolína Plíšková and Kristýna Plíšková won the title, defeating Gabriela Dabrowski and Alicja Rosolska in the final, 7–6^{(8–6)}, 6–4.

== Seeds ==
1. (Canada) Gabriela Dabrowski / (Poland) Alicja Rosolska (final)
2. (Germany) Julia Görges / (Germany) Andrea Petkovic (quarterfinals)
3. (Slovakia) Janette Husárová / (Czech Republic) Renata Voráčová (semifinals)
4. (Germany) Mona Barthel / (Romania) Irina-Camelia Begu (quarterfinals)

== Draw ==
=== Key ===
- Q = Qualifier
- WC = Wild card
- LL = Lucky loser
- Alt = Alternate
- ITF = ITF entry
- PR = Protected ranking
- SR = Special ranking
- SE = Special exempt
- JE = Junior exempt
- JR = Junior Accelerator Programme entrant
- CO = College Accelerator Programme entrant
- NG = Next Gen Accelerator Program entrant
- w/o = Walkover
- r = Retired
- d = Defaulted

=== Draw ===
First round
1	(Canada) G Dabrowski (Poland) A Rosolska	6	6
WC	(Austria) L-M Moser (Austria) N Rottmann	4	2
(United Kingdom) N Slater (United Kingdom) M South	6^{5}	7^{7}	[4]
(United Kingdom) S Murray (United Kingdom) J Windley	7^{7}	6^{5}	[10]
3	(Slovakia) J Husárová (Czech Republic) R Voráčová	6	6
WC	(Germany) A Beck (Austria) S Klemenschits	3	3
(Latvia) L Dekmeijere (United States) C McHale	2	4
(Serbia) A Krunić (Ukraine) O Savchuk	6	6
(Romania) M Niculescu (Czech Republic) K Zakopalová	3	6	[3]
(Czech Republic) Ka Plíšková (Czech Republic) Kr Plíšková	6	3	[10]
(Liechtenstein) S Vogt (Belgium) Y Wickmayer	4	6	[7]
4	(Germany) M Barthel (Romania) I-C Begu	6	4	[10]
(Russia) V Diatchenko (Czech Republic) E Hrdinová	4	4
(Ukraine) I Buryachok (Poland) K Piter	6	6
(Russia) V Solovyeva (Ukraine) E Svitolina	1	6	[6]
2	(Germany) J Görges (Germany) A Petkovic	6	3	[10]

Quarterfinals
1	(Canada) G Dabrowski (Poland) A Rosolska	6	7^{7}
(United Kingdom) S Murray (United Kingdom) J Windley	1	6^{4}
3	(Slovakia) J Husárová (Czech Republic) R Voráčová	6	6
(Serbia) A Krunić (Ukraine) O Savchuk	1	1
(Czech Republic) Ka Plíšková (Czech Republic) Kr Plíšková	3	6	[10]
4	(Germany) M Barthel (Romania) I-C Begu	6	3	[6]
(Ukraine) I Buryachok (Poland) K Piter	7^{7}	7
2	(Germany) J Görges (Germany) A Petkovic	6^{1}	5

Semifinals
1	(Canada) G Dabrowski (Poland) A Rosolska	6	2	[16]
3	(Slovakia) J Husárová (Czech Republic) R Voráčová	4	6	[14]
(Czech Republic) Ka Plíšková (Czech Republic) Kr Plíšková	6	6
(Ukraine) I Buryachok (Poland) K Piter	3	2

Final
1	(Canada) G Dabrowski (Poland) A Rosolska	6^{6}	4
(Czech Republic) Ka Plíšková (Czech Republic) Kr Plíšková	7^{8}	6
