= 2012 Generali Ladies Linz – Singles =

Singles
- 2012 Generali Ladies Linz

Final
- Champion: (Belarus) Victoria Azarenka
- Runner-up: (Germany) Julia Görges
- Score: 6–3, 6–4

Details
- Draw: 32
- Seeds: 8

Events
Singles	Doubles
← 2011 ·	Linz Open	· 2013 →

Petra Kvitová was the defending champion, but could not participate as Victoria Azarenka participated.

World No. 1 Azarenka went on to win the title, defeating Julia Görges in the final 6–3, 6–4.

== Seeds ==
1. (Belarus) Victoria Azarenka (champion)
2. (Serbia) Ana Ivanovic (quarterfinals)
3. (Slovakia) Dominika Cibulková (withdrew because of a shoulder injury)
4. (Czech Republic) Lucie Šafářová (first round)
5. (Germany) Julia Görges (final)
6. (Belgium) Yanina Wickmayer (withdrew because of a viral illness)
7. (Austria) Tamira Paszek (first round)
8. (Germany) Sabine Lisicki (first round)

== Main draw ==
=== Key ===
- Q = Qualifier
- WC = Wild card
- LL = Lucky loser
- Alt = Alternate
- ITF = ITF entry
- PR = Protected ranking
- SR = Special ranking
- SE = Special exempt
- JE = Junior exempt
- JR = Junior Accelerator Programme entrant
- CO = College Accelerator Programme entrant
- NG = Next Gen Accelerator Program entrant
- w/o = Walkover
- r = Retired
- d = Defaulted

=== Finals ===
Semifinals
1	(Belarus) Victoria Azarenka	6	6
LL	(Romania) Irina-Camelia Begu	2	1
5	(Germany) Julia Görges	1	6	6
Q	(Belgium) Kirsten Flipkens	6	2	3

Final
1	(Belarus) Victoria Azarenka	6	6
5	(Germany) Julia Görges	3	4

=== Top half ===
First round
1	(Belarus) V Azarenka	6	6
(Netherlands) A Rus	0	2
(Romania) S Halep	3
Q	(Ukraine) L Tsurenko	0^{r}
(Croatia) P Martić	6	6
(Romania) S Cîrstea	4	3
WC	(Austria) P Mayr-Achleitner	6	6
8	(Germany) S Lisicki	1	3
LL	(Colombia) C Castaño	0	4
LL	(Romania) I-C Begu	6	6
(Netherlands) K Bertens	7^{7}	1	6
(Germany) M Barthel	6^{3}	6	1
(Spain) C Suárez Navarro	6	6
(Slovakia) M Rybáriková	3	4
Q	(United States) B Mattek-Sands	6	6
7	(Austria) T Paszek	2	4

Second round
1	(Belarus) V Azarenka	6	6
(Romania) S Halep	1	1
(Croatia) P Martić	6	3	6
WC	(Austria) P Mayr-Achleitner	2	6	0
LL	(Romania) I-C Begu	6	7^{9}
(Netherlands) K Bertens	4	6^{7}
(Spain) C Suárez Navarro	3	3
Q	(United States) B Mattek-Sands	6	6

Quarterfinals
1	(Belarus) V Azarenka	6	6
(Croatia) P Martić	2	2
LL	(Romania) I-C Begu	6	1	6
Q	(United States) B Mattek-Sands	4	6	2

Semifinals
1	(Belarus) V Azarenka	6	6
LL	(Romania) I-C Begu	2	1

=== Bottom half ===
First round
5	(Germany) J Görges	6	7^{7}
(Slovakia) D Hantuchová	4	6^{5}
(Switzerland) R Oprandi	6	6
(Romania) A Cadanțu	2	1
(Czech Republic) L Hradecká	6	7^{7}
(Spain) S Soler Espinosa	3	6^{5}
(Sweden) S Arvidsson	3	6	7
4	(Czech Republic) L Šafářová	6	2	5
LL	(Kazakhstan) K Pervak	3	4
Q	(United States) M Burdette	6	6
Q	(Belgium) K Flipkens	6	6
(France) A Cornet	4	3
(Czech Republic) B Záhlavová-Strýcová	6^{3}	2
WC	(Germany) A Petkovic	7^{7}	6
(Romania) M Niculescu	5	3
2/WC	(Serbia) A Ivanovic	7	6

Second round
5	(Germany) J Görges	6	6
(Switzerland) R Oprandi	3	3
(Czech Republic) L Hradecká	4	6^{4}
(Sweden) S Arvidsson	6	7^{7}
Q	(United States) M Burdette	6	1	5
Q	(Belgium) K Flipkens	4	6	7
WC	(Germany) A Petkovic	4	3
2/WC	(Serbia) A Ivanovic	6	6

Quarterfinals
5	(Germany) J Görges	6	6
(Sweden) S Arvidsson	1	4
Q	(Belgium) K Flipkens	6	6
2/WC	(Serbia) A Ivanovic	4	0

Semifinals
5	(Germany) J Görges	1	6	6
Q	(Belgium) K Flipkens	6	2	3

== Qualifying ==
=== Seeds ===
1. (Romania) Irina-Camelia Begu (qualifying competition, lucky loser)
2. (Belgium) Kirsten Flipkens (qualified)
3. (United Kingdom) Anne Keothavong (first round)
4. (Kazakhstan) Sesil Karatantcheva (second round)
5. (Kazakhstan) Ksenia Pervak (qualifying competition, lucky loser)
6. (Ukraine) Lesia Tsurenko (qualified)
7. (Slovakia) Jana Čepelová (qualifying competition)
8. (Czech Republic) Kristýna Plíšková (first round)

=== Qualifiers ===
1. (United States) Mallory Burdette
2. (Belgium) Kirsten Flipkens
3. (Ukraine) Lesia Tsurenko
4. (United States) Bethanie Mattek-Sands

=== Lucky losers ===
1. (Romania) Irina-Camelia Begu
2. (Colombia) Catalina Castaño
3. (Kazakhstan) Ksenia Pervak

=== Draw ===
==== First qualifier ====
First round
1	(Romania) Irina-Camelia Begu	7^{13}	6^{5}	6
(France) Aravane Rezaï	6^{11}	7^{7}	4
(Germany) Tatjana Malek	4	3
(Switzerland) Stefanie Vögele	6	6
(Russia) Valeria Savinykh	2	2
(Germany) Anna-Lena Friedsam	6	6
(United States) Mallory Burdette	6	6
8	(Czech Republic) Kristýna Plíšková	3	1

Second round
1	(Romania) Irina-Camelia Begu	6	5	6
(Switzerland) Stefanie Vögele	1	7	4
(Germany) Anna-Lena Friedsam	6^{7}	7	3
(United States) Mallory Burdette	7^{9}	5	6

Qualifying competition
1	(Romania) Irina-Camelia Begu	4	1
(United States) Mallory Burdette	6	6

==== Second qualifier ====
First round
2	(Belgium) Kirsten Flipkens	3	6	6
(Italy) Karin Knapp	6	2	2
(Russia) Vera Dushevina	3	6	6
(Latvia) Anastasija Sevastova	6	1	4
(Germany) Annika Beck	7	6
WC	(Austria) Janina Toljan	5	2
(Australia) Anastasia Rodionova	6^{2}	3
7	(Slovakia) Jana Čepelová	7^{7}	6

Second round
2	(Belgium) Kirsten Flipkens	6	6
(Russia) Vera Dushevina	2	3
(Germany) Annika Beck	6	5	4
7	(Slovakia) Jana Čepelová	2	7	6

Qualifying competition
2	(Belgium) Kirsten Flipkens	5	6	6
7	(Slovakia) Jana Čepelová	7	2	3

==== Third qualifier ====
First round
3	(United Kingdom) Anne Keothavong	6	0	2
(Italy) Maria Elena Camerin	4	6	6
(Colombia) Catalina Castaño	6	6
WC	(Austria) Barbara Haas	2	1
WC	(Austria) Pia König	2	2
WC	(Austria) Yvonne Neuwirth	6	6
(Italy) Nastassja Burnett	3	6^{1}
6	(Ukraine) Lesia Tsurenko	6	7^{7}

Second round
(Italy) Maria Elena Camerin	6	0	3
(Colombia) Catalina Castaño	3	6	6
WC	(Austria) Yvonne Neuwirth	7^{12}	4	2
6	(Ukraine) Lesia Tsurenko	6^{10}	6	6

Qualifying competition
(Colombia) Catalina Castaño	6	1	3
6	(Ukraine) Lesia Tsurenko	3	6	6

==== Fourth qualifier ====
First round
4	(Kazakhstan) Sesil Karatantcheva	6	6
(Argentina) Paula Ormaechea	1	1
(Czech Republic) Karolína Plíšková	3	6^{4}
(United States) Bethanie Mattek-Sands	6	7^{7}
(Bosnia and Herzegovina) Mervana Jugić-Salkić	2	1
(United States) Jill Craybas	6	6
(Czech Republic) Eva Birnerová	6	2	6^{6}
5	(Kazakhstan) Ksenia Pervak	4	6	7^{8}

Second round
4	(Kazakhstan) Sesil Karatantcheva	5	6^{0}
(United States) Bethanie Mattek-Sands	7	7^{7}
(United States) Jill Craybas	1	2
5	(Kazakhstan) Ksenia Pervak	6	6

Qualifying competition
(United States) Bethanie Mattek-Sands	7^{9}	7
5	(Kazakhstan) Ksenia Pervak	6^{7}	5
