= 2012 Generali Ladies Linz – Doubles =

Doubles
- 2012 Generali Ladies Linz

Final
- Champions: (Germany) Anna-Lena Grönefeld (Czech Republic) Květa Peschke
- Runners-up: (Germany) Julia Görges (Czech Republic) Barbora Záhlavová-Strýcová
- Score: 6–3, 6–4

Details
- Draw: 16
- Seeds: 4

Events
Singles	Doubles
← 2011 ·	Linz Open	· 2013 →

Marina Erakovic and Elena Vesnina were the defending champions but decided not to participate.
Anna-Lena Grönefeld and Květa Peschke won the title, defeating Julia Görges and Barbora Záhlavová-Strýcová in the final, 6–3, 6–4

== Seeds ==
1. (Germany) Anna-Lena Grönefeld / (Czech Republic) Květa Peschke (champions)
2. (Germany) Julia Görges / (Czech Republic) Barbora Záhlavová-Strýcová (final)
3. (South Africa) Natalie Grandin / (Czech Republic) Vladimíra Uhlířová (first round, retired)
4. (Russia) Vera Dushevina / (Poland) Alicja Rosolska (quarterfinals)

== Draw ==
=== Key ===
- Q = Qualifier
- WC = Wild card
- LL = Lucky loser
- Alt = Alternate
- ITF = ITF entry
- PR = Protected ranking
- SR = Special ranking
- SE = Special exempt
- JE = Junior exempt
- JR = Junior Accelerator Programme entrant
- CO = College Accelerator Programme entrant
- NG = Next Gen Accelerator Program entrant
- w/o = Walkover
- r = Retired
- d = Defaulted

=== Draw ===
First round
1	(Germany) A-L Grönefeld (Czech Republic) K Peschke	6	6
(Belarus) E Dzehalevich (Georgia (country)) O Kalashnikova	2	2
(Czech Republic) Ka Plíšková (Czech Republic) Kr Plíšková	7^{7}	6
Alt	(Netherlands) A Rus (Netherlands) K Bertens	6^{4}	4
3	(South Africa) N Grandin (Czech Republic) V Uhlířová	4	0^{r}
(Italy) ME Camerin (Romania) S Halep	6	0
(Colombia) C Castaño (Czech Republic) E Hrdinová	3	4
(Bosnia and Herzegovina) M Jugić-Salkić (Austria) S Klemenschits	6	6
(Romania) A Cadanțu (Russia) V Savinykh	4	3
(Slovakia) D Hantuchová (Croatia) P Martić	6	6
WC	(Switzerland) R Oprandi (Germany) A Petkovic	3	6	[7]
4	(Russia) V Dushevina (Poland) A Rosolska	6	4	[10]
WC	(Austria) B Haas (Austria) P Mayr-Achleitner	4	3
(Romania) S Cîrstea (Austria) T Paszek	6	6
(Czech Republic) E Birnerová (France) A Cornet	4	6	[5]
2	(Germany) J Görges (Czech Republic) B Záhlavová-Strýcová	6	4	[10]

Quarterfinals
1	(Germany) A-L Grönefeld (Czech Republic) K Peschke	7	7
(Czech Republic) Ka Plíšková (Czech Republic) Kr Plíšková	5	6^{5}
(Italy) ME Camerin (Romania) S Halep	6	4	[10]
(Bosnia and Herzegovina) M Jugić-Salkić (Austria) S Klemenschits	0	6	[7]
(Slovakia) D Hantuchová (Croatia) P Martić	5	6	[10]
4	(Russia) V Dushevina (Poland) A Rosolska	7	1	[6]
(Romania) S Cîrstea (Austria) T Paszek	1	4
2	(Germany) J Görges (Czech Republic) B Záhlavová-Strýcová	6	6

Semifinals
1	(Germany) A-L Grönefeld (Czech Republic) K Peschke	6	7
(Italy) ME Camerin (Romania) S Halep	3	5
(Slovakia) D Hantuchová (Croatia) P Martić	7^{7}	3	[3]
2	(Germany) J Görges (Czech Republic) B Záhlavová-Strýcová	6^{3}	6	[10]

Final
1	(Germany) A-L Grönefeld (Czech Republic) K Peschke	6	6
2	(Germany) J Görges (Czech Republic) B Záhlavová-Strýcová	3	4
