= 2013 Generali Ladies Linz =

- Date: 7–13 October
- Edition: 27th
- Category: WTA International
- Prize money: $235,000
- Surface: Hard (indoor)
- Location: Linz, Austria
- Venue: TipsArena Linz

Champions

Singles
- (Germany) Angelique Kerber

Doubles
- (Czech Republic) Karolína Plíšková / (Czech Republic) Kristýna Plíšková
← 2012 ·	Generali Ladies Linz	· 2014 →

The 2013 Generali Ladies Linz was a tennis tournament played on indoor hard courts. It was the 27th edition of the Generali Ladies Linz, and part of the WTA International tournaments-category of the 2013 WTA Tour. It was held at the TipsArena Linz in Linz, Austria, on 7–13 October 2013.

== Singles entrants ==
=== Seeds ===
Country	Player	Rank^{1}	Seed
GER	Angelique Kerber	9	1
USA	Sloane Stephens	13	2
SRB	Ana Ivanovic	14	3
ESP	Carla Suárez Navarro	15	4
BEL	Kirsten Flipkens	19	5
ROU	Sorana Cîrstea	21	6
SVK	Dominika Cibulková	23	7
SVK	Daniela Hantuchová	31	8

- Rankings as of 30 September 2013

=== Other entrants ===
The following players received wildcards into the singles main draw:

- (Germany) Angelique Kerber
- (Austria) Melanie Klaffner
- (Austria) Patricia Mayr-Achleitner

The following players received entry from the qualifying draw:

- (Italy) Camila Giorgi
- (Serbia) Aleksandra Krunić
- (Poland) Katarzyna Piter
- (Czech Republic) Kristýna Plíšková

The following player received entry into the singles main draw as a lucky loser:

- (Ukraine) Maryna Zanevska

=== Withdrawals ===
Before the tournament

- (France) Alizé Cornet
- (Romania) Simona Halep
- (Czech Republic) Petra Kvitová

== Doubles entrants ==
=== Seeds ===
Country	Player	Country	Player	Rank^{1}	Seed
CAN	Gabriela Dabrowski	POL	Alicja Rosolska	119	1
GER	Julia Görges	GER	Andrea Petkovic	124	2
SVK	Janette Husárová	CZE	Renata Voráčová	134	3
GER	Mona Barthel	ROU	Irina-Camelia Begu	142	4

- ^{1} Rankings as of 30 September 2013

=== Other entrants ===
The following pairs received wildcards into the doubles main draw:

- (Germany) Annika Beck / (Austria) Sandra Klemenschits
- (Austria) Lisa-Maria Moser / (Austria) Nicole Rottmann

== Finals ==
=== Singles ===
- (Germany) Angelique Kerber defeated (Serbia) Ana Ivanovic 6–4, 7–6^{(8–6)}

=== Doubles ===
- (Czech Republic) Karolína Plíšková / (Czech Republic) Kristýna Plíšková defeated (Canada) Gabriela Dabrowski / (Poland) Alicja Rosolska 7–6^{(8–6)}, 6–4
