= 2013 Generali Ladies Linz – Singles =

Singles
- 2013 Generali Ladies Linz

Final
- Champion: (Germany) Angelique Kerber
- Runner-up: (Serbia) Ana Ivanovic
- Score: 6–4, 7–6^{(8–6)}

Details
- Draw: 32
- Seeds: 8

Events
Singles	Doubles
← 2012 ·	Linz Open	· 2014 →

Victoria Azarenka was the defending champion, but chose not to participate.

Angelique Kerber won the title, defeating Ana Ivanovic in the final, 6–4, 7–6^{(8–6)}.

== Seeds ==
Angelique Kerber received a wildcard after the original draw was made. The wildcard had originally been given to Lisa-Maria Moser, who was forced to withdraw from the tournament.
Kerber was given the top seed but placed in the bottom half of the draw, and several seeds were moved around in the draw to accommodate Kerber's late entry.

1. (Germany) Angelique Kerber (champion)
2. (United States) Sloane Stephens (quarterfinals)
3. (Serbia) Ana Ivanovic (final)
4. (Spain) Carla Suárez Navarro (semifinals)
5. (Belgium) Kirsten Flipkens (quarterfinals)
6. (Romania) Sorana Cîrstea (first round)
7. (Slovakia) Dominika Cibulková (quarterfinals)
8. (Slovakia) Daniela Hantuchová (first round)

== Draw ==
=== Key ===
- Q = Qualifier
- WC = Wild card
- LL = Lucky loser
- Alt = Alternate
- ITF = ITF entry
- PR = Protected ranking
- SR = Special ranking
- SE = Special exempt
- JE = Junior exempt
- JR = Junior Accelerator Programme entrant
- CO = College Accelerator Programme entrant
- NG = Next Gen Accelerator Program entrant
- w/o = Walkover
- r = Retired
- d = Defaulted

=== Finals ===
Semifinals
(Switzerland) Stefanie Vögele	4	4
3	(Serbia) Ana Ivanovic	6	6
4	(Spain) Carla Suárez Navarro	2	0
1/WC	(Germany) Angelique Kerber	6	6

Final
3	(Serbia) Ana Ivanovic	4	6^{6}
1/WC	(Germany) Angelique Kerber	6	7^{8}

=== Top half ===
First round
2	(United States) S Stephens	6	6
(Slovakia) M Rybáriková	3	1
(Germany) A Petkovic	6	7
(Austria) Y Meusburger	3	5
(Czech Republic) K Zakopalová	7	5	0
(Switzerland) S Vögele	5	7	6
(Italy) K Knapp	6	7^{8}
8	(Slovakia) D Hantuchová	2	6^{6}
3	(Serbia) A Ivanovic	6	6
(Belgium) Y Wickmayer	2	4
(Czech Republic) Ka Plíšková	5	2
(Italy) F Schiavone	7	6
(Romania) I-C Begu	2	6	3
Q	(Poland) K Piter	6	4	6
(Germany) A Beck	6	2	1
7	(Slovakia) D Cibulková	3	6	6

Second round
2	(United States) S Stephens	7^{7}	4	6
(Germany) A Petkovic	6^{1}	6	3
(Switzerland) S Vögele	4	6	7
(Italy) K Knapp	6	2	5
3	(Serbia) A Ivanovic	6	7
(Italy) F Schiavone	3	5
Q	(Poland) K Piter	0	1
7	(Slovakia) D Cibulková	6	6

Quarterfinals
2	(United States) S Stephens	7^{7}	4	5
(Switzerland) S Vögele	6^{3}	6	7
3	(Serbia) A Ivanovic	6	6
7	(Slovakia) D Cibulková	2	4

Semifinals
(Switzerland) S Vögele	4	4
3	(Serbia) A Ivanovic	6	6

=== Bottom half ===
First round
5	(Belgium) K Flipkens	2	6	6
(Croatia) D Vekić	6	2	2
(Germany) J Görges	2	3
Q	(Italy) C Giorgi	6	6
(Ukraine) E Svitolina	6	7
(Germany) M Barthel	2	5
Q	(Czech Republic) Kr Plíšková	2	3
4	(Spain) C Suárez Navarro	6	6
6	(Romania) S Cîrstea	6	3	4
WC	(Austria) P Mayr-Achleitner	1	6	6
Q	(Serbia) A Krunić	5	6	2
LL	(Ukraine) M Zanevska	7	2	6
(Romania) A Cadanțu	7^{7}	6
WC	(Austria) M Klaffner	6^{4}	2
(Romania) M Niculescu	6	1	2
1/WC	(Germany) A Kerber	0	6	6

Second round
5	(Belgium) K Flipkens	6	6
Q	(Italy) C Giorgi	2	1
(Ukraine) E Svitolina	1	4
4	(Spain) C Suárez Navarro	6	6
WC	(Austria) P Mayr-Achleitner	6	6^{1}	6
LL	(Ukraine) M Zanevska	1	7^{7}	4
(Romania) A Cadanțu	1	0
1/WC	(Germany) A Kerber	6	6

Quarterfinals
5	(Belgium) K Flipkens	1	3
4	(Spain) C Suárez Navarro	6	6
WC	(Austria) P Mayr-Achleitner	3	1
1/WC	(Germany) A Kerber	6	6

Semifinals
4	(Spain) C Suárez Navarro	2	0
1/WC	(Germany) A Kerber	6	6

== Qualifying ==
=== Seeds ===
1. (United States) Alison Riske (first round)
2. (United States) Christina McHale (first round)
3. (Italy) Camila Giorgi (qualified)
4. (Serbia) Vesna Dolonc (first round)
5. (France) Virginie Razzano (first round)
6. (Slovakia) Jana Čepelová (first round)
7. (Germany) Dinah Pfizenmaier (first round, retired)
8. (Sweden) Sofia Arvidsson (second round)

=== Qualifiers ===
1. (Czech Republic) Kristýna Plíšková
2. (Poland) Katarzyna Piter
3. (Italy) Camila Giorgi
4. (Serbia) Aleksandra Krunić

=== Lucky loser ===
1. (Ukraine) Maryna Zanevska

=== Qualifying draw ===
==== First qualifier ====
First round
1	(United States) Alison Riske	6	3	4
(France) Claire Feuerstein	4	6	6
(Czech Republic) Kristýna Plíšková	2	6	6
(Ukraine) Olga Savchuk	6	1	2
(Canada) Gabriela Dabrowski	3	5
(Ukraine) Maryna Zanevska	6	7
(Russia) Ksenia Pervak	6	6^{3}	6
6	(Slovakia) Jana Čepelová	2	7^{7}	2

Second round
(France) Claire Feuerstein	5	5
(Czech Republic) Kristýna Plíšková	7	7
(Ukraine) Maryna Zanevska	6	5	6
(Russia) Ksenia Pervak	1	7	4

Qualifying competition
(Czech Republic) Kristýna Plíšková	6	6
(Ukraine) Maryna Zanevska	0	1

==== Second qualifier ====
First round
2	(United States) Christina McHale	5	3
(Liechtenstein) Stephanie Vogt	7	6
(Poland) Katarzyna Piter	2	7	6
(Bosnia and Herzegovina) Jasmina Tinjić	6	5	1
(Kazakhstan) Sesil Karatantcheva	7	6
WC	(Austria) Janina Toljan	5	3
(Russia) Victoria Kan	7^{7}	6
5	(France) Virginie Razzano	6^{3}	4

Second round
(Liechtenstein) Stephanie Vogt	6^{6}	6	4
(Poland) Katarzyna Piter	7^{8}	4	6
(Kazakhstan) Sesil Karatantcheva	6	6
(Russia) Victoria Kan	2	1

Qualifying competition
(Poland) Katarzyna Piter	6	6
(Kazakhstan) Sesil Karatantcheva	2	3

==== Third qualifier ====
First round
3	(Italy) Camila Giorgi	6	6
(Czech Republic) Sandra Záhlavová	2	2
(Italy) Nastassja Burnett	7	6
(Czech Republic) Lucie Hradecká	5	3
WC	(Austria) Nicole Rottmann	3	4
(Czech Republic) Renata Voráčová	6	6
(Croatia) Petra Martić	2	0
8	(Sweden) Sofia Arvidsson	6	6

Second round
3	(Italy) Camila Giorgi	6	2
(Italy) Nastassja Burnett	3	0^{r}
(Czech Republic) Renata Voráčová	6	6
8	(Sweden) Sofia Arvidsson	3	4

Qualifying competition
3	(Italy) Camila Giorgi	6	6
(Czech Republic) Renata Voráčová	4	0

==== Fourth qualifier ====
First round
4	(Serbia) Vesna Dolonc	5	4
(Russia) Daria Gavrilova	7	6
(Serbia) Aleksandra Krunić	6	6
WC	(Austria) Pia König	1	2
WC	(Austria) Yvonne Neuwirth	2	4
(United Kingdom) Samantha Murray	6	6
(Slovakia) Michaela Hončová	6	4	5
7	(Germany) Dinah Pfizenmaier	1	6	1^{r}

Second round
(Russia) Daria Gavrilova	2	0
(Serbia) Aleksandra Krunić	6	6
(United Kingdom) Samantha Murray	6^{3}	6	2
(Slovakia) Michaela Hončová	7^{7}	3	6

Qualifying competition
(Serbia) Aleksandra Krunić	6	6
(Slovakia) Michaela Hončová	2	3
