= 2012 Generali Ladies Linz =

Women's tennis tournament

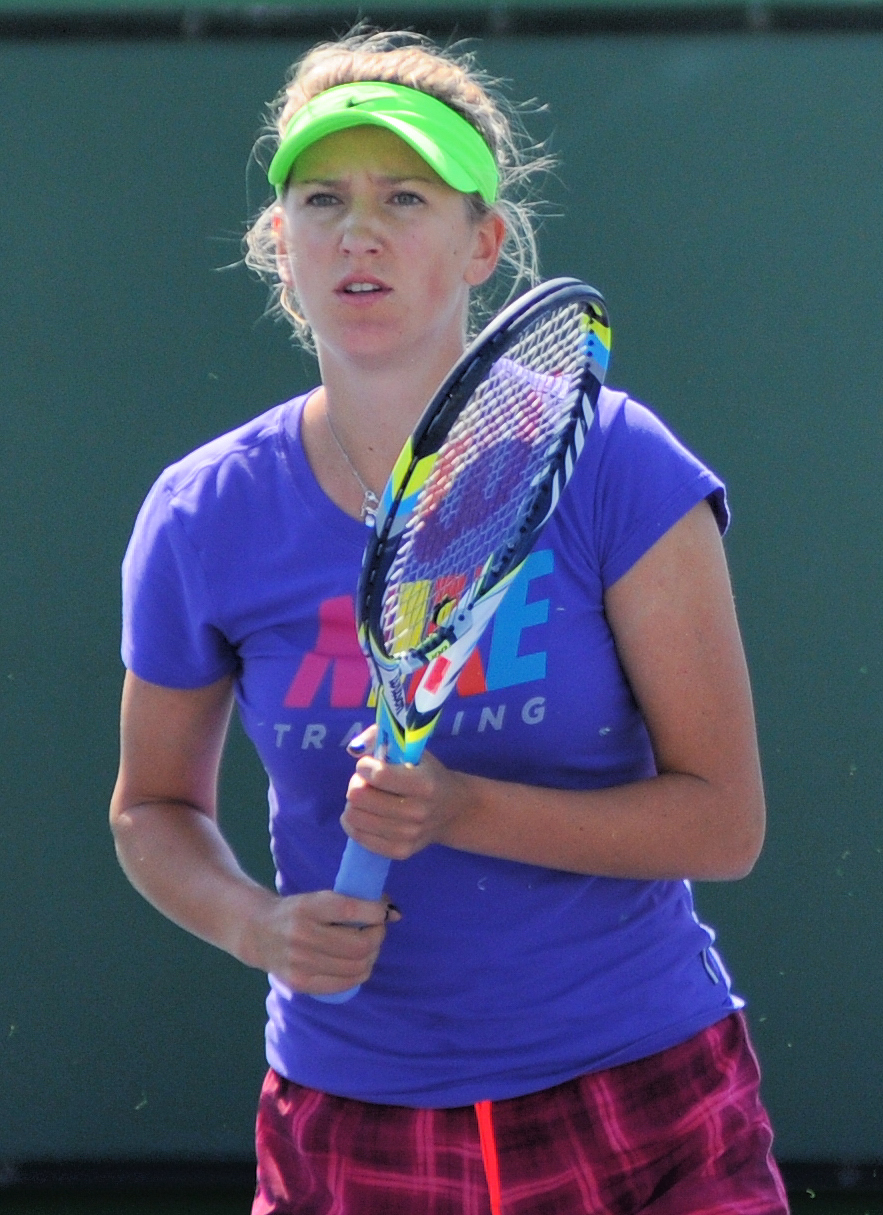
- Date: 8–14 October
- Edition: 26th
- Draw: 32S / 16D
- Prize money: $220,000
- Surface: Hard (DecoTurf)
- Location: Linz, Austria
- Venue: TipsArena Linz

Champions

Singles
- (Belarus) Victoria Azarenka

Doubles
- (Germany) Anna-Lena Grönefeld / (Czech Republic) Květa Peschke
← 2011 ·	Generali Ladies Linz	· 2013 →

The 2012 Generali Ladies Linz was a women's tennis tournament played on indoor hard courts. It was the 26th edition of the Generali Ladies Linz, and part of the WTA International tournaments of the 2012 WTA Tour. It was held at the TipsArena Linz in Linz, Austria, from 8 October until 14 October 2012. First-seeded Victoria Azarenka won the singles title.

== Finals ==
=== Singles ===
- (Belarus) Victoria Azarenka defeated (Germany) Julia Görges, 6–3, 6–4

=== Doubles ===
- (Germany) Anna-Lena Grönefeld / (Czech Republic) Květa Peschke defeated (Germany) Julia Görges / (Czech Republic) Barbora Záhlavová-Strýcová, 6–3, 6–4

== Singles main-draw entrants ==
=== Seeds ===
Country	Player	Rank^{1}	Seed
BLR	Victoria Azarenka	1	1
SRB	Ana Ivanovic	12	2
~~SVK~~	~~Dominika Cibulková~~	~~13~~	~~3~~
CZE	Lucie Šafářová	18	4
GER	Julia Görges	21	5
~~BEL~~	~~Yanina Wickmayer~~	~~25~~	~~6~~
AUT	Tamira Paszek	27	7
GER	Sabine Lisicki	28	8

- Rankings are as of October 1, 2012

=== Other entrants ===
The following players received wildcards into the singles main draw:

- (Serbia) Ana Ivanovic
- (Austria) Patricia Mayr-Achleitner
- (Germany) Andrea Petkovic

The following players received entry from the qualifying draw:

- (United States) Mallory Burdette
- (Belgium) Kirsten Flipkens
- (United States) Bethanie Mattek-Sands
- (Ukraine) Lesia Tsurenko

The following players received entry as lucky losers:

- (Romania) Irina-Camelia Begu
- (Colombia) Catalina Castaño

=== Withdrawals ===
- (Czech Republic) Iveta Benešová
- (Slovakia) Dominika Cibulková (shoulder injury)
- (Italy) Roberta Vinci
- (Georgia (country)) Anna Tatishvili (viral infection)
- (Belgium) Yanina Wickmayer (viral illness)

=== Retirements ===
- (Ukraine) Lesia Tsurenko (shoulder injury)

== Doubles main-draw entrants ==
=== Seeds ===
Country	Player	Country	Player	Rank^{1}	Seed
GER	Anna-Lena Grönefeld	CZE	Květa Peschke	31	1
GER	Julia Görges	CZE	Barbora Záhlavová-Strýcová	52	2
RSA	Natalie Grandin	CZE	Vladimíra Uhlířová	79	3
RUS	Vera Dushevina	POL	Alicja Rosolska	97	4

- ^{1} Rankings are as of October 1, 2012

=== Other entrants ===
The following pairs received wildcards into the doubles main draw:

- (Austria) Barbara Haas / (Austria) Patricia Mayr-Achleitner
- (Switzerland) Romina Oprandi / (Germany) Andrea Petkovic

The following pair received entry as alternates:

- (Netherlands) Kiki Bertens / (Netherlands) Arantxa Rus

=== Retirements ===
- (Czech Republic) Vladimíra Uhlířová (back injury)
