= 2011 Generali Ladies Linz – Doubles =

Doubles
- 2011 Generali Ladies Linz

Final
- Champions: (New Zealand) Marina Erakovic (Russia) Elena Vesnina
- Runners-up: (Germany) Julia Görges (Germany) Anna-Lena Grönefeld
- Score: 7–5, 6–1

Details
- Draw: 16
- Seeds: 4

Events
Singles	Doubles
← 2010 ·	Linz Open	· 2012 →

Renata Voráčová and Barbora Záhlavová-Strýcová were the defending champions, but Voráčová decided not to participate.

Záhlavová-Strýcová played alongside Iveta Benešová but were eliminated in the Quarterfinals by Mervana Jugić-Salkić and Sandra Klemenschits.

Marina Erakovic and Elena Vesnina won in the final, beating Julia Görges and Anna-Lena Grönefeld, 7–5, 6–1.

== Seeds ==
1. (Argentina) Gisela Dulko / (Italy) Flavia Pennetta (quarterfinals, retired due to Pennetta's left thigh injury)
2. (South Africa) Natalie Grandin / (Czech Republic) Vladimíra Uhlířová (first round)
3. (Czech Republic) Iveta Benešová / (Czech Republic) Barbora Záhlavová-Strýcová (quarterfinals)
4. (New Zealand) Marina Erakovic / (Russia) Elena Vesnina (champions)

== Draw ==
=== Key ===
- Q = Qualifier
- WC = Wild card
- LL = Lucky loser
- Alt = Alternate
- ITF = ITF entry
- PR = Protected ranking
- SR = Special ranking
- SE = Special exempt
- JE = Junior exempt
- JR = Junior Accelerator Programme entrant
- CO = College Accelerator Programme entrant
- NG = Next Gen Accelerator Program entrant
- w/o = Walkover
- r = Retired
- d = Defaulted

=== Draw ===
First round
1	(Argentina) G Dulko (Italy) F Pennetta	6	6
(Russia) M Kondratieva (Germany) J Wöhr	0	3
(Latvia) L Dekmeijere (Croatia) P Martić	6	6
(Ukraine) K Bondarenko (Poland) K Jans-Ignacik	4	2
4	(New Zealand) M Erakovic (Russia) E Vesnina	6	6
WC	(Austria) T Paszek (Czech Republic) L Šafářová	4	2
(Spain) A Medina Garrigues (Russia) A Pavlyuchenkova	6	4	[10]
(Russia) E Makarova (Poland) A Rosolska	2	6	[6]
(Bosnia and Herzegovina) M Jugić-Salkić (Austria) S Klemenschits	7^{7}	6
(Slovenia) A Klepač (Georgia (country)) A Tatishvili	6^{1}	3
WC	(Austria) P Mayr-Achleitner (Austria) Y Meusburger	3	2
3	(Czech Republic) I Benešová (Czech Republic) B Záhlavová-Strýcová	6	6
(Germany) J Görges (Germany) A-L Grönefeld	1	7^{7}	[11]
(Russia) N Bratchikova (Croatia) D Jurak	6	6^{4}	[9]
(Italy) A Brianti (Italy) S Errani	7^{10}	6^{4}	[10]
2	(South Africa) N Grandin (Czech Republic) V Uhlířová	6^{8}	7^{7}	[4]

Quarterfinals
1	(Argentina) G Dulko (Italy) F Pennetta	0	r
(Latvia) L Dekmeijere (Croatia) P Martić	3
4	(New Zealand) M Erakovic (Russia) E Vesnina	4	6	[10]
(Spain) A Medina Garrigues (Russia) A Pavlyuchenkova	6	3	[6]
(Bosnia and Herzegovina) M Jugić-Salkić (Austria) S Klemenschits	7^{7}	6
3	(Czech Republic) I Benešová (Czech Republic) B Záhlavová-Strýcová	6^{4}	4
(Germany) J Görges (Germany) A-L Grönefeld	6	6
(Italy) A Brianti (Italy) S Errani	4	0

Semifinals
(Latvia) L Dekmeijere (Croatia) P Martić	2	4
4	(New Zealand) M Erakovic (Russia) E Vesnina	6	6
(Bosnia and Herzegovina) M Jugić-Salkić (Austria) S Klemenschits	6	4	[8]
(Germany) J Görges (Germany) A-L Grönefeld	4	6	[10]

Final
4	(New Zealand) M Erakovic (Russia) E Vesnina	7	6
(Germany) J Görges (Germany) A-L Grönefeld	5	1
