= 2011 Generali Ladies Linz – Singles =

Singles
- 2011 Generali Ladies Linz

Final
- Champion: (Czech Republic) Petra Kvitová
- Runner-up: (Slovakia) Dominika Cibulková
- Score: 6–4, 6–1

Details
- Draw: 32
- Seeds: 8

Events
Singles	Doubles
← 2010 ·	Linz Open	· 2012 →

Ana Ivanovic was the defending champion, but decided not to participate.

Petra Kvitová won the tournament, defeating Dominika Cibulková in the final 6–4, 6–1.

== Seeds ==
1. (Czech Republic) Petra Kvitová (champion)
2. (Germany) Andrea Petkovic (withdrew due to right knee injury)
3. (Serbia) Jelena Janković (semifinals)
4. (Russia) Anastasia Pavlyuchenkova (second round)
5. (Germany) Sabine Lisicki (first round)
6. (Germany) Julia Görges (second round)
7. (Slovakia) Dominika Cibulková (final)
8. (Slovakia) Daniela Hantuchová (Quarterfinal)
9. (Italy) Flavia Pennetta (second round, withdrew due to a left thigh injury)

== Main draw ==
=== Key ===
- Q = Qualifier
- WC = Wild card
- LL = Lucky loser
- Alt = Alternate
- ITF = ITF entry
- PR = Protected ranking
- SR = Special ranking
- SE = Special exempt
- JE = Junior exempt
- JR = Junior Accelerator Programme entrant
- CO = College Accelerator Programme entrant
- NG = Next Gen Accelerator Program entrant
- w/o = Walkover
- r = Retired
- d = Defaulted

=== Finals ===
Semifinals
1/WC	(Czech Republic) Petra Kvitová	4	6	6
3/WC	(Serbia) Jelena Janković	6	4	3
(Czech Republic) Lucie Šafářová	1	4
7	(Slovakia) Dominika Cibulková	6	6

Final
1/WC	(Czech Republic) Petra Kvitová	6	6
7	(Slovakia) Dominika Cibulková	4	1

=== Top half ===
First round
1/WC	(Czech Republic) P Kvitová	6	6
(Canada) R Marino	2	2
Q	(France) S Foretz Gacon	6	2	2
WC	(Austria) P Mayr-Achleitner	3	6	6
(Russia) K Pervak	6	6
Q	(Russia) V Diatchenko	4	1
Q	(Croatia) P Martić	3	7^{8}	1
8	(Slovakia) D Hantuchová	6	6^{6}	6
3/WC	(Serbia) J Janković	4
(Ukraine) K Bondarenko	1^{r}
(Russia) E Makarova	4	1
LL	(United Kingdom) A Keothavong	6	6
LL	(Russia) E Rodina	6	2
(Slovakia) M Rybáriková	3	1^{r}
(Latvia) A Sevastova	4	6	6^{7}
6	(Germany) J Görges	6	3	7^{9}

Second round
1/WC	(Czech Republic) P Kvitová	6	6
WC	(Austria) P Mayr-Achleitner	2	3
(Russia) K Pervak	7	3	4
8	(Slovakia) D Hantuchová	5	6	6
3/WC	(Serbia) J Janković	3	6	6
LL	(United Kingdom) A Keothavong	6	2	1
LL	(Russia) E Rodina	6	6
6	(Germany) J Görges	3	4

Quarterfinals
1/WC	(Czech Republic) P Kvitová	6	6
8	(Slovakia) D Hantuchová	2	2
3/WC	(Serbia) J Janković	6	6
LL	(Russia) E Rodina	2	4

Semifinals
1/WC	(Czech Republic) P Kvitová	4	6	6
3/WC	(Serbia) J Janković	6	4	3

=== Bottom half ===
First round
5	(Germany) S Lisicki	5	6	3
(Italy) A Brianti	7	4	6
(Czech Republic) I Benešová	3	6	3
(Czech Republic) L Šafářová	6	4	6
(Austria) T Paszek	5	3
Q	(Romania) S Cîrstea	7	6
(Spain) A Medina Garrigues	4	6	3
4	(Russia) A Pavlyuchenkova	6	2	6
7	(Slovakia) D Cibulková	4	7^{7}	1
(United Kingdom) E Baltacha	6	6^{3}	0^{r}
(Italy) S Errani	6	6
(Slovenia) P Hercog	0	3
LL	(Australia) A Rodionova	7^{8}	6
(Czech Republic) B Záhlavová-Strýcová	6^{6}	1
(Russia) E Vesnina	6^{4}	2
9	(Italy) F Pennetta	7^{7}	6

Second round
(Italy) A Brianti	4	2
(Czech Republic) L Šafářová	6	6
Q	(Romania) S Cîrstea	4	6	6
4	(Russia) A Pavlyuchenkova	6	0	4
7	(Slovakia) D Cibulková	6^{1}	6	6
(Italy) S Errani	7^{7}	3	1
LL	(Australia) A Rodionova	w/o
9	(Italy) F Pennetta

Quarterfinals
(Czech Republic) L Šafářová	7	6
Q	(Romania) S Cîrstea	5	2
7	(Slovakia) D Cibulková	6^{5}	6	6
LL	(Australia) A Rodionova	7^{7}	2	1

Semifinals
(Czech Republic) L Šafářová	1	4
7	(Slovakia) D Cibulková	6	6

== Qualifying ==
=== Seeds ===
1. (Croatia) Petra Martić (qualified)
2. (Spain) Carla Suárez Navarro (first round)
3. (Belarus) Anastasiya Yakimova (second round)
4. (New Zealand) Marina Erakovic (first round)
5. (Australia) Jelena Dokić (first round, retired)
6. (Germany) Mona Barthel (second round)
7. (Romania) Sorana Cîrstea (qualified)
8. (Netherlands) Arantxa Rus (first round)

=== Qualifiers ===
1. (Croatia) Petra Martić
2. (France) Stéphanie Foretz Gacon
3. (Romania) Sorana Cîrstea
4. (Russia) Vitalia Diatchenko

=== Lucky losers ===
1. (Russia) Evgeniya Rodina
2. (United Kingdom) Anne Keothavong
3. (Australia) Anastasia Rodionova

=== Draw ===
==== First qualifier ====
First round
1	(Croatia) Petra Martić	6	6
WC	(Austria) Jeannine Prentner	1	1
(Bosnia and Herzegovina) Jasmina Tinjić	5	3
(Czech Republic) Sandra Záhlavová	7	6
(Canada) Aleksandra Wozniak	7	2
(Georgia (country)) Anna Tatishvili	5	1^{r}
(United Kingdom) Naomi Broady	6	6
8	(Netherlands) Arantxa Rus	0	2

Second round
1	(Croatia) Petra Martić	7	6
(Czech Republic) Sandra Záhlavová	5	0
(Canada) Aleksandra Wozniak	4	6^{2}
(United Kingdom) Naomi Broady	6	7^{7}

Qualifying competition
1	(Croatia) Petra Martić	6	6
(United Kingdom) Naomi Broady	4	2

==== Second qualifier ====
First round
2	(Spain) Carla Suárez Navarro	7	5	4
(Germany) Scarlett Werner	5	7	6
(France) Stéphanie Foretz Gacon	6	6
WC	(Czech Republic) Klára Fabíková	1	3
(Germany) Anna-Lena Grönefeld	6	3	7^{7}
(Germany) Kathrin Wörle	4	6	6^{4}
(Russia) Evgeniya Rodina	6	0
5	(Australia) Jelena Dokić	3	0^{r}

Second round
(Germany) Scarlett Werner	4	6	3
(France) Stéphanie Foretz Gacon	6	4	6
(Germany) Anna-Lena Grönefeld	0	2
(Russia) Evgeniya Rodina	6	6

Qualifying competition
(France) Stéphanie Foretz Gacon	6	7
(Russia) Evgeniya Rodina	1	5

==== Third qualifier ====
First round
3	(Belarus) Anastasiya Yakimova	6	6
(Ukraine) Viktoriya Kutuzova	3	0
(Russia) Nina Bratchikova	6	2	1
(Australia) Anastasia Rodionova	4	6	6
(Spain) Silvia Soler-Espinosa	6	6
WC	(Austria) Janina Toljan	3	3
(Austria) Nikola Hofmanova	7^{7}	0	0
7	(Romania) Sorana Cîrstea	6^{5}	6	6

Second round
3	(Belarus) Anastasiya Yakimova	6^{2}	1
(Australia) Anastasia Rodionova	7^{7}	6
(Spain) Silvia Soler-Espinosa	6	1	5
7	(Romania) Sorana Cîrstea	2	6	7

Qualifying competition
(Australia) Anastasia Rodionova	1	2
7	(Romania) Sorana Cîrstea	6	6

==== Fourth qualifier ====
First round
4	(New Zealand) Marina Erakovic	4	1
(Russia) Vitalia Diatchenko	6	6
(Italy) Karin Knapp	6	1	4
(Croatia) Ana Vrljić	2	6	6
(United Kingdom) Anne Keothavong	6	6
(Slovakia) Zuzana Luknárová	3	3
WC	(Austria) Yvonne Meusburger	6	3	5
6	(Germany) Mona Barthel	4	6	7

Second round
(Russia) Vitalia Diatchenko	6	6
(Croatia) Ana Vrljić	1	1
(United Kingdom) Anne Keothavong	6	7^{7}
6	(Germany) Mona Barthel	2	6^{4}

Qualifying competition
(Russia) Vitalia Diatchenko	6	6
(United Kingdom) Anne Keothavong	4	2
