= 2002 Canberra Women's Classic – Singles =

Singles
- 2002 Canberra Women's Classic

Final
- Champion: (Israel) Anna Smashnova
- Runner-up: (Thailand) Tamarine Tanasugarn
- Score: 7–5, 7–6^{(7–2)}

Details
- Draw: 32 (2WC/4Q)
- Seeds: 8

Events
Singles	Doubles
← 2001 ·	Canberra International	· 2003 →

Justine Henin was the defending champion, but chose to compete at Sydney during the same week.

Anna Smashnova won the title by defeating Tamarine Tanasugarn 7–5, 7–6^{(7–2)} in the final.

== Seeds ==
1. (Thailand) Tamarine Tanasugarn (final)
2. (Italy) Francesca Schiavone (first round)
3. (Spain) Cristina Torrens Valero (first round)
4. (Luxembourg) Anne Kremer (first round)
5. (Russia) Elena Likhovtseva (second round)
6. (Switzerland) Patty Schnyder (quarterfinals)
7. (France) Nathalie Dechy (quarterfinals)
8. (Croatia) Iva Majoli (first round)

== Draw ==
=== Key ===
- Q = Qualifier
- WC = Wild card
- LL = Lucky loser
- Alt = Alternate
- SE = Special exempt
- PR = Protected ranking
- ITF = ITF entry
- JE = Junior exempt
- w/o = Walkover
- r = Retired
- d = Defaulted
- SR = Special ranking

=== Finals ===
Semifinals
1	(Thailand) Tamarine Tanasugarn	6	6
(United States) Lilia Osterloh	4	4
(Israel) Anna Smashnova	7	6
Q	(Australia) Amanda Grahame	5	2

Final
1	(Thailand) Tamarine Tanasugarn	5	6^{2}
(Israel) Anna Smashnova	7	7^{7}

=== Top half ===
First round
1	(Thailand) T Tanasugarn	6	6^{3}	6
Q	(Kazakhstan) I Selyutina	2	7^{7}	3
(Czech Republic) D Chládková	6	6
(Slovakia) Ľ Cervanová	3	2
(Slovenia) M Matevžič	4	6	2
(Greece) E Daniilidou	6	4	6
(Paraguay) R de los Ríos	4	4
6	(Switzerland) P Schnyder	6	6
4	(Luxembourg) A Kremer	6^{7}	3
(United States) S Reeves	7^{9}	6
(Germany) J Kandarr	3	3
(United States) L Osterloh	6	6
(United States) J Craybas	2	6	7
(Canada) J Nejedly	6	3	5
(Italy) Ad Serra Zanetti	1	6^{5}
7	(France) N Dechy	6	7^{7}

Second round
1	(Thailand) T Tanasugarn	6	6
(Czech Republic) D Chládková	4	3
(Greece) E Daniilidou	4	3
6	(Switzerland) P Schnyder	6	6
(United States) S Reeves	6	4	2
(United States) L Osterloh	3	6	6
(United States) J Craybas	6	6^{8}	5
7	(France) N Dechy	0	7^{10}	7

Quarterfinals
1	(Thailand) T Tanasugarn	6	6
6	(Switzerland) P Schnyder	2	4
(United States) L Osterloh	4	7	6
7	(France) N Dechy	6	5	3

Semifinals
1	(Thailand) T Tanasugarn	6	6
(United States) L Osterloh	4	4

=== Bottom half ===
First round
5	(Russia) E Likhovtseva	6	6
(Tunisia) S Sfar	3	2
Q	(Austria) P Wartusch	7	4	2
(France) É Loit	5	6	6
(Israel) A Smashnova	6	6
Q	(Japan) S Obata	1	3
WC	(Australia) B Stewart	7	4	6
3	(Spain) C Torrens Valero	5	6	1
8	(Croatia) I Majoli	4	2
(Australia) R McQuillan	6	6
(Germany) B Rittner	5	0^{r}
Q	(Australia) A Grahame	7	2
WC	(Australia) A Ellwood	0	3
(Australia) E Dominikovic	6	6
(Hungary) P Mandula	6	7^{7}
2	(Italy) F Schiavone	1	6^{3}

Second round
5	(Russia) E Likhovtseva	4	3
(France) É Loit	6	6
(Israel) A Smashnova	7^{7}	6
WC	(Australia) B Stewart	6^{3}	0
(Australia) R McQuillan	4	4
Q	(Australia) A Grahame	6	6
(Australia) E Dominikovic	7^{7}	6^{5}	3
(Hungary) P Mandula	6^{3}	7^{7}	6

Quarterfinals
(France) É Loit	3	0
(Israel) A Smashnova	6	6
Q	(Australia) A Grahame	5	6	6
(Hungary) P Mandula	7	1	1

Semifinals
(Israel) A Smashnova	7	6
Q	(Australia) A Grahame	5	2
