= 2001 Canberra International – Doubles =

Doubles
- 2001 Canberra International

Final
- Champions: (United States) Nicole Arendt (Japan) Ai Sugiyama
- Runners-up: (South Africa) Nannie de Villiers (Australia) Annabel Ellwood
- Score: 6–4, 7–6^{(7–2)}

Details
- Draw: 16
- Seeds: 4

Events
Singles	Doubles
- Canberra International

Nicole Arendt and Ai Sugiyama won in the final 6–4, 7–6^{(7–2)} against Nannie de Villiers and Annabel Ellwood.

== Seeds ==
Champion seeds are indicated in bold text while text in italics indicates the round in which those seeds were eliminated.

1. (United States) **Nicole Arendt** / (Japan) **Ai Sugiyama (champions)**
2. (United States) Chanda Rubin / (France) Sandrine Testud (first round)
3. (South Africa) Liezel Horn / (Argentina) Paola Suárez (first round)
4. (Netherlands) Kristie Boogert / (Netherlands) Miriam Oremans (quarterfinals)

== Draw ==
Key

- Q = Qualifier
- WC = Wild card
- LL = Lucky loser
- Alt = Alternate
- ITF = ITF entry
- PR = Protected ranking
- SR = Special ranking
- SE = Special exempt
- JE = Junior exempt
- JR = Junior Accelerator Programme entrant
- CO = College Accelerator Programme entrant
- NG = Next Gen Accelerator Program entrant
- w/o = Walkover
- r = Retired
- d = Defaulted

First round
1	(United States) **N Arendt** (Japan) **A Sugiyama**	**6**	**6**
(Croatia) I Majoli (Austria) S Plischke	1	3
(Slovakia) K Habšudová (Canada) S Jeyaseelan	4	3
(Sweden) **Å Carlsson** (Bulgaria) **M Maleeva**	**6**	**6**
3	(South Africa) L Horn (Argentina) P Suárez
Q	(Czech Republic) **D Bedáňová** (Japan) **H Inoue**	w/o
(Italy) **G Casoni** (Germany) **J Kandarr**	**6**	**6**
(United States) D Buth (Slovenia) T Hergold	3	2
(Slovenia) M Matevžič (Belarus) N Ostrovskaya	2	3
(Chinese Taipei) **J Lee** (Indonesia) **W Prakusya**	**6**	**6**
(Japan) S Asagoe (Japan) R Hiraki	4	**7^{7}**	5
4	(Netherlands) **K Boogert** (Netherlands) **M Oremans**	**6**	6^{4}	**7**
(South Africa) **N de Villiers** (Australia) **A Ellwood**	**6**	**6**
(France) N Dechy (Slovakia) H Nagyová	2	4
WC	(Australia) **A Grahame** (Belgium) **J Henin**	w/o
2	(United States) C Rubin (France) S Testud

Quarterfinals
1	(United States) **N Arendt** (Japan) **A Sugiyama**	**7^{7}**	**6**
(Sweden) Å Carlsson (Bulgaria) M Maleeva	6^{3}	3
Q	(Czech Republic) **D Bedáňová** (Japan) **H Inoue**	6^{2}	**6**	**6**
(Italy) G Casoni (Germany) J Kandarr	**7^{7}**	4	2
(Chinese Taipei) **J Lee** (Indonesia) **W Prakusya**	2	**6**	**6**
4	(Netherlands) K Boogert (Netherlands) M Oremans	**6**	3	4
(South Africa) **N de Villiers** (Australia) **A Ellwood**	2	**6**	**6**
WC	(Australia) A Grahame (Belgium) J Henin	**6**	4	2

Semifinals
1	(United States) **N Arendt** (Japan) **A Sugiyama**	**6**	**6**
Q	(Czech Republic) D Bedáňová (Japan) H Inoue	4	4
(Chinese Taipei) J Lee (Indonesia) W Prakusya	3	6^{4}
(South Africa) **N de Villiers** (Australia) **A Ellwood**	**6**	**7^{7}**

Final
1	(United States) **Nicole Arendt** (Japan) **Ai Sugiyama**	**6**	**7^{7}**
(South Africa) Nannie de Villiers (Australia) Annabel Ellwood	4	6^{2}

== Qualifying ==
=== Seeds ===
Both seeded teams received byes to the second round.

1. (Hungary) Zsófia Gubacsi / (Ukraine) Tatiana Perebiynis (second round)
2. (Austria) Evelyn Fauth / (Hungary) Petra Mandula (second round)

=== Qualifiers ===
1. **(Czech Republic) Dája Bedáňová / (Japan) Haruka Inoue**

==== Draw ====
- NB: The first two rounds used the pro set format.

First round		Second round			Final Round
		1	(Hungary) Zsófia Gubacsi (Ukraine) Tatiana Perebiynis	4
(Australia) Monique Adamczak (Australia) Nadia Johnston	7		(Czech Republic) **Dája Bedáňová** (Japan) **Haruka Inoue**	**8**
(Czech Republic) **Dája Bedáňová** (Japan) **Haruka Inoue**	**9**				(Czech Republic) **Dája Bedáňová** (Japan) **Haruka Inoue**	**6**	**7**
					(Australia) Mireille Dittmann (Australia) Kristen van Elden	0	5
			(Australia) **Mireille Dittmann** (Australia) **Kristen van Elden**	**8**
		2	(Austria) Evelyn Fauth (Hungary) Petra Mandula	4
