= 2002 Canberra Women's Classic =

- Date: 6–12 January
- Edition: 2nd
- Category: Tier V
- Draw: 32S / 16D
- Prize money: $110,000
- Surface: Hard / outdoor
- Location: Canberra, Australia
- Venue: National Sports Club

Champions

Singles
- (Israel) Anna Smashnova

Doubles
- (South Africa) Nannie de Villiers / (Kazakhstan) Irina Selyutina
- Canberra International

The 2002 Canberra Women's Classic was a women's tennis tournament played on outdoor hard courts at the National Sports Club in Lyneham, Canberra, Australia and was part of the Tier V category of the 2002 WTA Tour. It was the second edition of the tournament and was held from 6 through 12 January 2002. Unseeded Anna Smashnova won the singles title and earned $16,000 first-prize money.

== Finals ==
=== Singles ===
(Israel) Anna Smashnova defeated (Thailand) Tamarine Tanasugarn 7–5, 7–6^{(7–2)}

- It was Smashnova's 2nd singles title of the year and the 4th of her career.

=== Doubles ===
(South Africa) Nannie de Villiers / (Kazakhstan) Irina Selyutina defeated (United States) Samantha Reeves / (Australia) Adriana Serra Zanetti 6–2, 6–3
