= 2003 Canberra Women's Classic – Doubles =

Doubles
- 2003 Canberra Women's Classic

Final
- Champion: (Italy) Tathiana Garbin (France) Émilie Loit
- Runner-up: (Czech Republic) Dája Bedáňová (Russia) Dinara Safina
- Score: 6–3, 3–6, 6–4

Details
- Draw: 16
- Seeds: 4

Events
Singles	Doubles
- Canberra Women's Classic

Nannie de Villiers and Irina Selyutina were the defending champions, but Selyutina chose not to compete, and de Villiers chose to participate in the Hobart International instead.

Tathiana Garbin and Émilie Loit won the title.

== Seeds ==
1. (Spain) Virginia Ruano Pascual / (Spain) Magüi Serna (first round)
2. (Italy) Tathiana Garbin / (France) Émilie Loit (winners)
3. (Russia) Eugenia Kulikovskaia / (Belarus) Tatiana Poutchek (semifinals)
4. (Australia) Catherine Barclay / (Germany) Martina Müller (first round)

== Results ==
Key

- Q = Qualifier
- WC = Wild card
- LL = Lucky loser
- Alt = Alternate
- ITF = ITF entry
- PR = Protected ranking
- SR = Special ranking
- SE = Special exempt
- JE = Junior exempt
- JR = Junior Accelerator Programme entrant
- CO = College Accelerator Programme entrant
- NG = Next Gen Accelerator Program entrant
- w/o = Walkover
- r = Retired
- d = Defaulted

=== Draw ===
First round
1	(Spain) V Ruano Pascual (Spain) M Serna	3	6^{4}
(Croatia) J Kostanić (Slovenia) M Matevžič	6	7
(Spain) C Martínez Granados (Italy) F Pennetta	3	2
(Czech Republic) D Bedáňová (Russia) D Safina	6	6
3	(Russia) E Kulikovskaia (Belarus) T Poutchek	6	6
(Australia) S Stone (Australia) S Stosur	4	2
(South Korea) Y-J Cho (Italy) Ad Serra Zanetti	3	6	4
Q	(France) M Bartoli (France) S Foretz	6	3	6
WC	(Australia) C Dellacqua (Australia) N Sewell	5	5
(United States) L Granville (United States) M Tu	7	7
(Australia) R McQuillan (Australia) L McShea	6	7
4	(Australia) C Barclay (Germany) M Müller	1	5
(France) V Razzano (Croatia) S Talaja	6^{2}	7	3
(Argentina) C Fernández (Indonesia) A Widjaja	7	6^{6}	6
(Germany) An Barna (Germany) M Weingärtner	6^{2}	3
2	(Italy) T Garbin (France) É Loit	7	6

Quarterfinals
(Croatia) J Kostanić (Slovenia) M Matevžič	2	3
(Czech Republic) D Bedáňová (Russia) D Safina	6	6
3	(Russia) E Kulikovskaia (Belarus) T Poutchek	2	6	6
Q	(France) M Bartoli (France) S Foretz	6	4	2
(United States) L Granville (United States) M Tu	3	6	1
(Australia) R McQuillan (Australia) L McShea	6	4	6
(Argentina) C Fernández (Indonesia) A Widjaja	6	2	6^{5}
2	(Italy) T Garbin (France) É Loit	3	6	7

Semifinals
(Czech Republic) D Bedáňová (Russia) D Safina	6	2	7
3	(Russia) E Kulikovskaia (Belarus) T Poutchek	3	6	5
(Australia) R McQuillan (Australia) L McShea	4	1
2	(Italy) T Garbin (France) É Loit	6	6

Final
(Czech Republic) D Bedáňová (Russia) D Safina	3	6	4
2	(Italy) T Garbin (France) É Loit	6	3	6
