= 2001 Canberra International =

- Date: 7–13 January
- Edition: 1st
- Category: Tier III
- Draw: 30S / 16D
- Prize money: $170,000
- Surface: Hard / outdoor
- Location: Canberra, Australia
- Venue: National Sports Club

Champions

Singles
- (Belgium) Justine Henin

Doubles
- (United States) Nicole Arendt / (Japan) Ai Sugiyama
- Canberra International

The 2001 Canberra International was a women's tennis tournament played on outdoor hard courts at the National Sports Club in Canberra, Australia and was part of the Tier III category of the 2001 WTA Tour. It was the inaugural edition of the tournament and was held from 7 through 13 January 2001. The Belgian player Justine Henin won the singles title and earned $27,000 first-prize money.

== Finals ==
=== Singles ===
(Belgium) Justine Henin defeated (France) Sandrine Testud 6–2, 6–2

- It was Henin's 2nd title of the year and the 3rd of her career.

=== Doubles ===
(United States) Nicole Arendt / (Japan) Ai Sugiyama defeated (South Africa) Nannie de Villiers / (Australia) Annabel Ellwood 6–4, 7–6^{(7–2)}

- It was Arendt's 1st title of the year and the 14th of her career. It was Sugiyama's 1st title of the year and the 21st of her career.

== WTA entrants ==
=== Seeds ===
Country	Player	Rank^{1}	Seed
FRA	Mary Pierce	7	1
RUS	Elena Dementieva	11	2
USA	Chanda Rubin	13	3
FRA	Sandrine Testud	17	4
BUL	Magdalena Maleeva	23	5
SUI	Patty Schnyder	25	6
FRA	Nathalie Dechy	26	7
CRO	Silvija Talaja	29	8

- Rankings are as of January 1, 2001.

=== Other entrants ===
The following players received wildcards into the singles main draw:

- (Australia) Annabel Ellwood
- (Australia) Amanda Grahame

The following players received entry from the qualifying draw:

- (Indonesia) Wynne Prakusya
- (Tunisia) Selima Sfar
- (Japan) Yuka Yoshida
- (Czech Republic) Lenka Němečková
