= 2003 Canberra Women's Classic =

Tennis tournament in Australia

- Date: 6–12 January
- Edition: 3rd
- Category: Tier V
- Draw: 32S / 16D
- Prize money: $110,000
- Surface: Hard / outdoor
- Location: Canberra, Australia
- Venue: National Sports Club

Champions

Singles
- (United States) Meghann Shaughnessy

Doubles
- (Italy) Tathiana Garbin / (France) Émilie Loit
- Canberra International

The 2003 Canberra Women's Classic was a women's tennis tournament played on outdoor hard courts at the National Sports Club in Canberra, Australia and was part of the Tier V category of the 2003 WTA Tour. It was the third edition of the tournament and was held from 6 through 12 January 2003. Second-seeded Meghann Shaughnessy won the singles title and earned $16,000 first-prize money.

== Finals ==
=== Singles ===
(United States) Meghann Shaughnessy defeated (Italy) Francesca Schiavone 6–1, 6–1

- It was Shaughnessy's 1st singles title of the year and the 3rd of her career.

=== Doubles ===
(Italy) Tathiana Garbin / (France) Émilie Loit defeated (Czechoslovakia) Dája Bedáňová / (Russia) Dinara Safina 6–3, 3–6, 6–4
