= 2005 Richard Luton Properties Canberra Women's Classic – Singles =

Singles
- 2005 Richard Luton Properties Canberra Women's Classic

Final
- Champion: (Serbia and Montenegro) Ana Ivanovic
- Runner-up: (Hungary) Melinda Czink
- Score: 7–5, 6–1

Details
- Draw: 32
- Seeds: 8

Events
| Singles | Doubles |
- Canberra International

Paola Suárez was the defending champion of the 2005 Canberra International but did not participate in the tournament on that year. Ana Ivanovic, a qualifier, won in the final 7–5, 6–1, against lucky loser Melinda Czink. It was her first ever WTA title and it was achieved just before she made her Grand Slam début at the 2005 Australian Open.

Ana Ivanovic and Melinda Czink also met in the finals of the qualifying draw here with Ivanovic prevailing 6–1, 6–3. This was the first time two players played each other twice in two finals at a tournament. Ivanovic and Czink battled each other at the Qualifying finals and the Main Draw finals, with Ivanovic winning both times.

== Seeds ==
1. (Italy) Silvia Farina Elia (quarterfinals)
2. (Israel) Anna Smashnova (second round)
3. (United States) Meghann Shaughnessy (first round)
4. (France) Marion Bartoli (quarterfinals)
5. (France) Émilie Loit (first round)
6. (Australia) Nicole Pratt (first round)
7. (Spain) María Sánchez Lorenzo (first round)
8. (Italy) Tathiana Garbin (second round)

== Draw ==
Key

- Q = Qualifier
- WC = Wild card
- LL = Lucky loser
- Alt = Alternate
- ITF = ITF entry
- PR = Protected ranking
- SR = Special ranking
- SE = Special exempt
- JE = Junior exempt
- JR = Junior Accelerator Programme entrant
- CO = College Accelerator Programme entrant
- NG = Next Gen Accelerator Program entrant
- w/o = Walkover
- r = Retired
- d = Defaulted

=== Finals ===
Semifinals
(Ukraine) Yuliana Fedak | 1 | 2
Q | (Serbia and Montenegro) Ana Ivanovic | 6 | 6
(United States) Lindsay Lee-Waters | 6^{1} | 6^{4}
LL | (Hungary) Melinda Czink | 7 | 7

Final
Q | (Serbia and Montenegro) Ana Ivanovic | 7 | 6
LL | (Hungary) Melinda Czink | 5 | 1

=== Top half ===
First round
1 | (Italy) S Farina Elia | 7 | 6
(Russia) T Panova | 6^{0} | 4
(Russia) V Dushevina | 5 | 4
(Germany) A-L Grönefeld | 7 | 6
(Thailand) T Tanasugarn | 7 | 6
WC | (Australia) M Adamczak | 5 | 0
(Ukraine) Y Fedak | 6 | 6
6 | (Australia) N Pratt | 0 | 3
4 | (France) M Bartoli | 6 | 6
(France) S Foretz | 2 | 0
WC | (Australia) L Breadmore | 1 | 0
(Netherlands) M Krajicek | 6 | 6
Q | (Czech Republic) L Němečková | 2 | 1
Q | (Serbia and Montenegro) A Ivanovic | 6 | 6
Q | (Australia) E Dominikovic | 6 | 6
7 | (Spain) M Sánchez Lorenzo | 3 | 2

Second round
1 | (Italy) S Farina Elia | 6 | 6
Q | (Germany) A-L Grönefeld | 2 | 3
(Thailand) T Tanasugarn | 2 | 6^{6}
(Ukraine) Y Fedak | 6 | 7
4 | (France) M Bartoli | 6 | 6
(Netherlands) M Krajicek | 4 | 4
Q | (Serbia and Montenegro) A Ivanovic | 5 | 6 | 6
Q | (Australia) E Dominikovic | 7 | 3 | 4

Quarterfinals
1 | (Italy) S Farina Elia | 2 | 4
(Ukraine) Y Fedak | 6 | 6
4 | (France) M Bartoli | 1 | 0 | r
Q | (Serbia and Montenegro) A Ivanovic | 6 | 2

Semifinals
(Ukraine) Y Fedak | 1 | 2
Q | (Serbia and Montenegro) A Ivanovic | 6 | 6

=== Bottom half ===
First round
5 | (France) É Loit | 5 | 4
(Luxembourg) C Schaul | 7 | 6
(Germany) A Barna | 7 | 6
Q | (Russia) E Bychkova | 5 | 4
(United States) L Lee-Waters | 7 | 6
(Spain) N Llagostera Vives | 6^{0} | 1
(Hungary) A Kapros | 6 | 6
3 | (United States) M Shaughnessy | 2 | 3
8 | (Italy) T Garbin | 6 | 6
(Luxembourg) A Kremer | 2 | 1
(Czech Republic) M Paštiková | 3 | 6 | 2
(Germany) M Weingärtner | 6 | 3 | 6
(Madagascar) D Randriantefy | 7 | 5 | 6^{8}
LL | (Hungary) M Czink | 5 | 7 | 7
(Spain) A Parra Santonja | 0 | 0
2 | (Israel) A Smashnova | 6 | 6

Second round
(Luxembourg) C Schaul | 1 | 2 | r
(Germany) A Barna | 6 | 3
(United States) L Lee-Waters | 1 | 7 | 6
(Hungary) A Kapros | 6 | 5 | 3
8 | (Italy) T Garbin | 4 | 3
(Germany) M Weingärtner | 6 | 6
LL | (Hungary) M Czink | 6 | 6
2 | (Israel) A Smashnova | 2 | 1

Quarterfinals
(Germany) A Barna | 4 | 2
(United States) L Lee-Waters | 6 | 6
(Germany) M Weingärtner | 3 | 4
LL | (Hungary) M Czink | 6 | 6

Semifinals
(United States) L Lee-Waters | 6^{1} | 6^{4}
LL | (Hungary) M Czink | 7 | 7

== Qualifying ==
=== Seeds ===
1. (Italy) Antonella Serra Zanetti (second round)
2. (Serbia and Montenegro) Ana Ivanovic (qualified)
3. (Japan) Saori Obata (first round)
4. (Australia) Evie Dominikovic (qualified)
5. (Hungary) Melinda Czink (qualifying competition, lucky loser)
6. (Japan) Aiko Nakamura (second round)
7. (Indonesia) Angelique Widjaja (withdrew due to injury)
8. (Spain) Laura Pous Tió (first round)

=== Qualifiers ===
1. (Czech Republic) Lenka Němečková
2. (Serbia and Montenegro) Ana Ivanovic
3. (Russia) Ekaterina Bychkova
4. (Australia) Evie Dominikovic

=== Qualifying draw ===
==== First qualifier ====
First round
1 | (Italy) Antonella Serra Zanetti | 6 | 4 | 6
WC | (Australia) Shayna McDowell | 4 | 6 | 3
WC | (South Africa) Megan Price | 1 | 1
(Spain) Conchita Martínez Granados | 6 | 6
(Ukraine) Yuliya Beygelzimer | 3 | 6 | 4
(Czech Republic) Lenka Němečková | 6 | 2 | 6
(Thailand) Suchanun Viratprasert | 6 | 6^{6} | 6
Alt | (South Africa) Chanelle Scheepers | 2 | 7 | 2

Second round
1 | (Italy) Antonella Serra Zanetti | 4 | 0
(Spain) Conchita Martínez Granados | 6 | 6
(Czech Republic) Lenka Němečková | 7 | 6
(Thailand) Suchanun Viratprasert | 5 | 2

Qualifying competition
(Spain) Conchita Martínez Granados | 6 | 4 | 6^{2}
(Czech Republic) Lenka Němečková | 4 | 6 | 7

==== Second qualifier ====
First round
2 | (Serbia and Montenegro) Ana Ivanovic | 6 | 6
WC | (Australia) Tyra Calderwood | 3 | 2
(Italy) Nathalie Viérin | 6 | 6
(Czech Republic) Kateřina Böhmová | 0 | 4
(Czech Republic) Eva Birnerová | 4 | 6 | 6
(Romania) Edina Gallovits | 6 | 2 | 3
WC | (Australia) Christina Wheeler | 3 | 5
5 | (Hungary) Melinda Czink | 6 | 7

Second round
2 | (Serbia and Montenegro) Ana Ivanovic | 6 | 6
(Italy) Nathalie Viérin | 2 | 3
(Czech Republic) Eva Birnerová | 0 | 3
5 | (Hungary) Melinda Czink | 6 | 6

Qualifying competition
2 | (Serbia and Montenegro) Ana Ivanovic | 6 | 6
5 | (Hungary) Melinda Czink | 1 | 3

==== Third qualifier ====
First round
3 | (Japan) Saori Obata | 3 | 6 | 3
(Estonia) Maret Ani | 6 | 3 | 6
(Spain) Lourdes Domínguez Lino | 1 | 4
(Germany) Sandra Klösel | 6 | 6
(Russia) Ekaterina Bychkova | 6 | 7
(Czech Republic) Sandra Kleinová | 1 | 6^{5}
(Brazil) Maria Fernanda Alves | 3 | 6 | 2
6 | (Japan) Aiko Nakamura | 6 | 4 | 6

Second round
(Estonia) Maret Ani | 6^{3} | 7 | 3
(Germany) Sandra Klösel | 7 | 5 | 6
(Russia) Ekaterina Bychkova | 6 | 3 | 6
6 | (Japan) Aiko Nakamura | 2 | 6 | 2

Qualifying competition
(Germany) Sandra Klösel | 7 | 4 | 3
(Russia) Ekaterina Bychkova | 5 | 6 | 6

==== Fourth qualifier ====
First round
4 | (Australia) Evie Dominikovic | 7 | 6
(United Kingdom) Elena Baltacha | 5 | 3
(Australia) Tiffany Welford | 1 | 0
(Austria) Yvonne Meusburger | 6 | 6
(Netherlands) Elise Tamaëla | 6 | 4 | 0
(Romania) Delia Sescioreanu | 4 | 6 | 6
(Finland) Emma Laine | 3 | 6 | 6
8 | (Spain) Laura Pous Tió | 6 | 2 | 2

Second round
4 | (Australia) Evie Dominikovic | 6 | 6
(Austria) Yvonne Meusburger | 4 | 4
(Romania) Delia Sescioreanu | 6 | 7
(Finland) Emma Laine | 1 | 5

Qualifying competition
4 | (Australia) Evie Dominikovic | 6 | 6
8 | (Romania) Delia Sescioreanu | 3 | 0
