= 2005 Moorilla Hobart International – Doubles =

Doubles
- 2005 Moorilla Hobart International

Final
- Champion: (China) Yan Zi (China) Zheng Jie
- Runner-up: (Spain) Anabel Medina Garrigues (Russia) Dinara Safina
- Score: 6–4, 7–5

Events
Singles	Doubles
← 2004 ·	Moorilla Hobart International	· 2006 →

Shinobu Asagoe and Seiko Okamoto were the defending champions, but did not participate.

Yan Zi and Zheng Jie won the title.

== Seeds ==
1. (China) Yan Zi / (China) Zheng Jie (champions)
2. (Spain) Anabel Medina Garrigues / (Russia) Dinara Safina (final)
3. (United States) Jill Craybas / (United States) Laura Granville (semifinals)
4. (Argentina) Gisela Dulko / (United States) Abigail Spears (first round)

== Draw ==
=== Key ===
- Q = Qualifier
- WC = Wild card
- LL = Lucky loser
- Alt = Alternate
- SE = Special exempt
- PR = Protected ranking
- ITF = ITF entry
- JE = Junior exempt
- w/o = Walkover
- r = Retired
- d = Defaulted
- SR = Special ranking

=== Results ===
First round
1	(China) Z Yan (China) J Zheng	6	6
WC	(Australia) M Dittmann (Australia) E Hewson	2	1
Q	(Chinese Taipei) S-w Hsieh (China) N Li	5	7	5
(Australia) C Dellacqua (Australia) N Sewell	7	5	7
4	(Argentina) G Dulko (United States) A Spears	0	5
(Russia) A Jidkova (Ukraine) T Perebiynis	6	7
(Czech Republic) I Benešová (Czech Republic) K Peschke	6	7
(United States) J Russell (Italy) M Santangelo	4	5
(Italy) ME Camerin (Spain) M Marrero	6^{6}	5
(Czech Republic) B Strýcová (Germany) J Wöhr	7	7
(Ukraine) A Bondarenko (Russia) An Rodionova	6	1	1
3	(United States) J Craybas (United States) L Granville	3	6	6
(Germany) V Henke (Germany) M Müller	3	3
(Puerto Rico) K Brandi (South Africa) K Grant	6	6
(Poland) M Domachowska (Slovakia) Ľ Kurhajcová	1	1
2	(Spain) A Medina Garrigues (Russia) D Safina	6	6

Quarterfinals
1	(China) Z Yan (China) J Zheng	6	6
(Australia) C Dellacqua (Australia) N Sewell	2	1
(Russia) A Jidkova (Ukraine) T Perebiynis	7	7
(Czech Republic) I Benešová (Czech Republic) K Peschke	5	5
(Czech Republic) B Strýcová (Germany) J Wöhr	4	6^{3}
3	(United States) J Craybas (United States) L Granville	6	7
(Puerto Rico) K Brandi (South Africa) K Grant	5	4
2	(Spain) A Medina Garrigues (Russia) D Safina	7	6

Semifinals
1	(China) Z Yan (China) J Zheng	6	6
(Russia) A Jidkova (Ukraine) T Perebiynis	2	0
3	(United States) J Craybas (United States) L Granville	3	7	4
2	(Spain) A Medina Garrigues (Russia) D Safina	6	6^{6}	6

Final
1	(China) Z Yan (China) J Zheng	6	7
2	(Spain) A Medina Garrigues (Russia) D Safina	4	5
