= 2005 Richard Luton Properties Canberra Women's Classic – Doubles =

Doubles
- 2005 Richard Luton Properties Canberra Women's Classic

Final
- Champions: (Italy) Tathiana Garbin (Slovenia) Tina Križan
- Runners-up: (Czech Republic) Gabriela Navrátilová (Czech Republic) Michaela Paštiková
- Score: 7–5, 1–6, 6–4

Details
- Draw: 16
- Seeds: 4

Events
Singles	Doubles
- Canberra International

Jelena Kostanić and Claudine Schaul were the defending champions, but Kostanic did not compete this year. Schaul was about to team up with Émilie Loit, but had to withdraw because of a left groin strain.

Tathiana Garbin and Tina Križan won the title by defeating Gabriela Navrátilová and Michaela Paštiková 7–5, 1–6, 6–4 in the final. It was the 8th title for Garbin and the 6th title for Križan in their respective doubles careers.

== Seeds ==
1. (France) Marion Bartoli / (Germany) Anna-Lena Grönefeld (semifinals, withdrew)
2. (Luxembourg) ~~Claudine Schaul~~ / (France) ~~Émilie Loit~~ (withdrew due to a left groin strain on Schaul)
3. (Italy) Tathiana Garbin / (Slovenia) Tina Križan (champions)
4. (Czech Republic) Gabriela Navrátilová / (Czech Republic) Michaela Paštiková (final)

== Draw ==
Key

- Q = Qualifier
- WC = Wild card
- LL = Lucky loser
- Alt = Alternate
- ITF = ITF entry
- PR = Protected ranking
- SR = Special ranking
- SE = Special exempt
- JE = Junior exempt
- JR = Junior Accelerator Programme entrant
- CO = College Accelerator Programme entrant
- NG = Next Gen Accelerator Program entrant
- w/o = Walkover
- r = Retired
- d = Defaulted

=== Draw ===
First round
1	(France) M Bartoli (Germany) AL Grönefeld	6	6
WC	(Australia) M Adamzcak (Australia) N Kriz	2	2
(Brazil) MF Alves (United States) L Lee-Waters	3	3
(Latvia) L Dekmeijere (Japan) N Miyagi	6	6
3	(Italy) T Garbin (Slovenia) T Križan	6	6
Q	(Ukraine) Y Beygelzimer (Germany) S Klösel	3	4
(Spain) A Parra Santonja (Italy) A Serra Zanetti	6	7
(Turkey) İ Şenoğlu (Romania) A Vanc	2	5
(Czech Republic) O Blahotová (Spain) N Llagostera Vives	3	2
(New Zealand) L Baker (Italy) F Lubiani	6	6
(Spain) L Domínguez Lino (Spain) C Martínez Granados	1	2
4	(Czech Republic) G Navrátilová (Czech Republic) M Paštiková	6	6
(Ukraine) Y Fedak (France) S Foretz	2	7	5
(Finland) E Laine (Germany) K Wörle	6	5	7
(Australia) T Musgrave (Australia) C Wheeler	6	6
LL	(Germany) Ad Barna (Germany) An Barna	2	3

Quarterfinals
1	(France) M Bartoli (Germany) AL Grönefeld	6	6
(Latvia) L Dekmeijere (Japan) N Miyagi	4	3
3	(Italy) T Garbin (Slovenia) T Križan	4	6	6
(Spain) A Parra Santonja (Italy) A Serra Zanetti	6	3	2
(New Zealand) L Baker (Italy) F Lubiani	6	1	6^{6}
4	(Czech Republic) G Navrátilová (Czech Republic) M Paštiková	2	6	7^{8}
(Finland) E Laine (Germany) K Wörle	4	1
(Australia) T Musgrave (Australia) C Wheeler	6	6

Semifinals
1	(France) M Bartoli (Germany) AL Grönefeld
3	(Italy) T Garbin (Slovenia) T Križan	w/o
4	(Czech Republic) G Navrátilová (Czech Republic) M Paštiková	6	6^{3}	7^{7}
(Australia) T Musgrave (Australia) C Wheeler	2	7^{7}	6^{2}

Final
3	(Italy) T Garbin (Slovenia) T Križan	7	1	6
4	(Czech Republic) G Navrátilová (Czech Republic) M Paštiková	5	6	4

== Qualifying ==
=== Seeds ===
1. (Hungary) Melinda Czink / (Luxembourg) Anne Kremer (first round)
2. (Ukraine) Yuliya Beygelzimer / (Germany) Sandra Klösel (qualified)

=== Qualifiers ===
1. (Ukraine) Yuliya Beygelzimer / (Germany) Sandra Klösel

=== Qualifying draw ===
First round
1	(Hungary) Melinda Czink (Luxembourg) Anne Kremer	5
WC	(Australia) Lauren Breadmore (Australia) Tiffany Welford	8
(Germany) Adriana Barna (Germany) Anca Barna	1
2	(Ukraine) Yuliya Beygelzimer (Germany) Sandra Klösel	8

Qualifying competition
WC	(Australia) Lauren Breadmore (Australia) Tiffany Welford	2	1
2	(Ukraine) Yuliya Beygelzimer (Germany) Sandra Klösel	6	6
