= 2005 Richard Luton Properties Canberra Women's Classic =

- Date: 10–16 January
- Edition: 5th
- Category: WTA Tier V
- Draw: 32S / 16D
- Prize money: US$110,000
- Surface: Hard (Rebound Ace)
- Location: Canberra, Australia

Champions

Singles
- (Serbia and Montenegro) Ana Ivanovic

Doubles
- (Italy) Tathiana Garbin / (Slovenia) Tina Križan
- Canberra International

The 2005 Richard Luton Properties Canberra Women's Classic was a women's tennis tournament played on outdoor hard courts. It was the fifth edition of the Canberra International, and part of the WTA Tier V tournaments of the 2005 WTA Tour. It took place at the National Sports Club in Canberra, Australia, from 10 January until 16 January 2005. Unseeded Ana Ivanovic, who entered the main draw as a qualifier, won the singles title.

== Finals ==
=== Singles ===
(Serbia and Montenegro) Ana Ivanovic defeated (Hungary) Melinda Czink, 7–5, 6–1

=== Doubles ===
(Italy) Tathiana Garbin / (Slovenia) Tina Križan defeated (Czech Republic) Gabriela Navrátilová / (Czech Republic) Michaela Paštiková, 7–5, 1–6, 6–4

== Singles main-draw entrants ==
=== Seeds ===
Country	Player	Rank^{1}	Seed
ITA	Silvia Farina Elia	20	1
ISR	Anna Smashnova	32	2
USA	Meghann Shaughnessy	40	3
FRA	Marion Bartoli	41	4
FRA	Émilie Loit	45	5
AUS	Nicole Pratt	50	6
ESP	María Sánchez Lorenzo	51	7
ITA	Tathiana Garbin	58	8

- ^{1} Rankings are as of 27 December 2004

=== Other entrants ===
The following players received wildcards into the singles main draw:

- (Australia) Monique Adamczak
- (Australia) Lauren Breadmore

The following players received entry from the qualifying draw:

- (Russia) Ekaterina Bychkova
- (Australia) Evie Dominikovic
- (Serbia and Montenegro) Ana Ivanovic
- (Czech Republic) Lenka Němečková

The following player received entry as a lucky loser:

- (Hungary) Melinda Czink

=== Withdrawals ===
Before the tournament

- (Slovenia) Katarina Srebotnik → replaced by Melinda Czink

== Doubles main-draw entrants ==
=== Seeds ===
Country	Player	Rank^{1}	Country	Player	Rank^{1}	Seed
FRA	Marion Bartoli	37	GER	Anna-Lena Grönefeld	47	1
FRA	~~Émilie Loit~~	31	LUX	~~Claudine Schaul~~	72	2
ITA	Tathiana Garbin	81	SLO	Tina Križan	59	3
CZE	Gabriela Navrátilová	62	CZE	Michaela Paštiková	88	4

- ^{1} Rankings are as of 27 December 2004

=== Other entrants ===
The following pair received a wildcard into the doubles main draw:

- (Australia) Monique Adamczak / (Australia) Nicole Kriz

The following pair received entry from the qualifying draw:

- (Ukraine) Yuliya Beygelzimer / (Germany) Sandra Klösel

The following pair received entry as lucky losers:

- (Germany) Adriana Barna / (Germany) Anca Barna

=== Withdrawals ===
Before the tournament

- (France) Émilie Loit / (Luxembourg) Claudine Schaul → replaced by Adriana Barna / Anca Barna

During the tournament

- (France) Marion Bartoli / (Germany) Anna-Lena Grönefeld
