= 2003 Moorilla Hobart International – Singles =

Singles
- 2003 Moorilla Hobart International

Final
- Champion: (Australia) Alicia Molik
- Runner-up: (United States) Amy Frazier
- Score: 6–2, 4–6, 6–4

Details
- Draw: 32
- Seeds: 8

Events
Singles	Doubles
← 2002 ·	Moorilla Hobart International	· 2004 →

Martina Suchá was the defending champion, but lost to Alicia Molik in the first round.

Molik went on to win the tournament, beating Amy Frazier 6–2, 4–6, 6–4, in the final.

== Seeds ==
1. (Slovenia) Katarina Srebotnik (second round)
2. (United States) Amy Frazier (final)
3. (Austria) Barbara Schett (second round)
4. (Russia) Elena Likhovtseva (semifinals)
5. (Russia) Vera Zvonareva (quarterfinals)
6. (Italy) Rita Grande (first round)
7. (Zimbabwe) Cara Black (second round)
8. (United States) Jill Craybas (quarterfinals)

== Draw ==
=== Key ===
- Q = Qualifier
- WC = Wild card
- LL = Lucky loser
- Alt = Alternate
- ITF = ITF entry
- PR = Protected ranking
- SR = Special ranking
- SE = Special exempt
- JE = Junior exempt
- JR = Junior Accelerator Programme entrant
- CO = College Accelerator Programme entrant
- NG = Next Gen Accelerator Program entrant
- w/o = Walkover
- r = Retired
- d = Defaulted

=== Finals ===
Semifinals
(Australia) Alicia Molik	6	4	6
(Czech Republic) Iveta Benešová	1	6	3
4	(Russia) Elena Likhovtseva	3	4
2	(United States) Amy Frazier	6	6

Final
(Australia) Alicia Molik	6	4	6
2	(United States) Amy Frazier	2	6	4

=== Top half ===
1st round
1	(Slovenia) K Srebotnik	6	6
(Austria) P Wartusch	1	2
(Slovakia) M Suchá	1	2
(Australia) A Molik	6	6
(United States) S Taylor	7	6
(Argentina) M Díaz Oliva	5	1
(Sweden) Å Svensson	2	2
5	(Russia) V Zvonareva	6	6
3	(Austria) B Schett	6	6
WC	(Australia) T Welford	4	2
Q	(Japan) S Asagoe	7	6
(Russia) A Jidkova	6^{5}	2
(Italy) A Serra Zanetti	3	6	3
(Czech Republic) I Benešová	6	2	6
WC	(Australia) C Watson	2	6^{4}
7	(Zimbabwe) C Black	6	7

2nd round
1	(Slovenia) K Srebotnik	3	0
(Australia) A Molik	6	6
(United States) S Taylor	2	0
5	(Russia) V Zvonareva	6	6
3	(Austria) B Schett	3	3
Q	(Japan) S Asagoe	6	6
(Czech Republic) I Benešová	6	6
7	(Zimbabwe) C Black	4	4

Quarterfinals
(Australia) A Molik	5	7	6
5	(Russia) V Zvonareva	7	6^{4}	4
Q	(Japan) S Asagoe	3	6^{4}
(Czech Republic) I Benešová	6	7

Semifinals
(Australia) A Molik	6	4	6
(Czech Republic) I Benešová	1	6	3

=== Bottom half ===
1st round
8	(United States) J Craybas	6	6
(Spain) M Marrero	1	1
(Spain) C Torrens Valero	3	6	6
Q	(Hungary) Z Gubacsi	6	4	4
Q	(Republic of Ireland) K Liggan	4	4
(Paraguay) R Neffa de los Ríos	6	6
(Germany) B Rittner	7	2	1
4	(Russia) E Likhovtseva	5	6	6
6	(Italy) R Grande	6	3	6^{4}
(Germany) A Rösch	3	6	7
(Slovakia) H Nagyová	4	6	3
(Hungary) P Mandula	6	4	6
(Switzerland) E Gagliardi	2	1
Q	(Ukraine) T Perebiynis	6	6
(Belgium) E Callens	1	7	3
2	(United States) A Frazier	6	5	6

2nd round
8	(United States) J Craybas	6	7
(Spain) C Torrens Valero	4	5
(Paraguay) R Neffa de los Ríos	7	3	1
4	(Russia) E Likhovtseva	5	6	6
(Germany) Rösch	6	6
(Hungary) P Mandula	3	1
Q	(Ukraine) T Perebiynis
2	(United States) A Frazier	w/o

Quarterfinals
8	(United States) J Craybas	5	3
4	(Russia) E Likhovtseva	7	6
(Germany) A Rösch	3	0
2	(United States) A Frazier	6	6

Semifinals
4	(Russia) E Likhovtseva	3	4
2	(United States) A Frazier	6	6

== Qualifying ==
=== Seeds ===
1. (Japan) Shinobu Asagoe (qualified)
2. (Spain) Anabel Medina Garrigues (first round)
3. (Ukraine) Tatiana Perebiynis (qualified)
4. (Hungary) Zsófia Gubacsi (qualified)
5. (Austria) Barbara Schwartz (qualifying competition)
6. (Sweden) Sofia Arvidsson (second round)
7. (Czech Republic) Alena Vašková (first round)
8. (Hungary) Melinda Czink (qualifying competition)

=== Qualifiers ===
1. (Japan) Shinobu Asagoe
2. (Republic of Ireland) Kelly Liggan
3. (Ukraine) Tatiana Perebiynis
4. (Hungary) Zsófia Gubacsi

=== Qualifying draw ===
==== First qualifier ====
First round
1	(Japan) Shinobu Asagoe	6	7^{7}
WC	(Australia) Darya Ivanov	1	6^{0}
(Netherlands) Anousjka van Exel	6	6
(Italy) Francesca Lubiani	4	3
(Colombia) Catalina Castaño	0	2
(Belarus) Nadejda Ostrovskaya	6	6
(United States) Kristina Brandi	6	4	1
8	(Hungary) Melinda Czink	0	6	6

Second round
1	(Japan) Shinobu Asagoe	6	6
(Netherlands) Anousjka van Exel	0	1
(Belarus) Nadejda Ostrovskaya	6	4	3
8	(Hungary) Melinda Czink	3	6	6

Qualifying competition
1	(Japan) Shinobu Asagoe	6	6
8	(Hungary) Melinda Czink	3	0

==== Second qualifier ====
First round
2	(Spain) Anabel Medina Garrigues	2	3
(Germany) Angelika Bachmann	6	6
(United Kingdom) Julie Pullin	6	6
WC	(Australia) Gabrielle Baker	1	2
(Ukraine) Alona Bondarenko	5	6	2
(Republic of Ireland) Kelly Liggan	7	2	6
(Czech Republic) Zuzana Hejdová	6^{4}	0
6	(Sweden) Sofia Arvidsson	7^{7}	6

Second round
(Germany) Angelika Bachmann	6	6
(United Kingdom) Julie Pullin	2	4
(Republic of Ireland) Kelly Liggan	6	6
6	(Sweden) Sofia Arvidsson	1	2

Qualifying competition
(Germany) Angelika Bachmann	6^{7}	5	d
(Republic of Ireland) Kelly Liggan	7^{9}	4

==== Third qualifier ====
First round
3	(Ukraine) Tatiana Perebiynis	7	7^{7}
(Ukraine) Elena Tatarkova	5	6^{5}
(Australia) Mireille Dittmann	7^{7}	0	3
(Czech Republic) Lenka Němečková	6^{4}	6	6
(United Kingdom) Anne Keothavong	6	5	2
(United States) Tiffany Dabek	4	7	6
(United Kingdom) Lucie Ahl	7^{7}	6^{6}	6
7	(Czech Republic) Alena Vašková	6^{5}	7^{8}	3

Second round
3	(Ukraine) Tatiana Perebiynis	4	6	6
(Czech Republic) Lenka Němečková	6	3	2
(United States) Tiffany Dabek	3	6	6
(United Kingdom) Lucie Ahl	6	3	1

Qualifying competition
3	(Ukraine) Tatiana Perebiynis	6	6
(United States) Tiffany Dabek	4	1

==== Fourth qualifier ====
First round
4	(Hungary) Zsófia Gubacsi	6	2	6
WC	(Australia) Deanna Roberts	2	6	2
WC	(Australia) Kristen van Elden	3	2
(Spain) Nuria Llagostera Vives	6	6
(Germany) Vanessa Henke	6^{3}	5
(Spain) Arantxa Parra Santonja	7^{7}	7
(Austria) Sybille Bammer	1	4
5	(Austria) Barbara Schwartz	6	6

Second round
4	(Hungary) Zsófia Gubacsi	6	6
(Spain) Nuria Llagostera Vives	1	3
(Spain) Arantxa Parra Santonja	1	6	3
5	(Austria) Barbara Schwartz	6	2	6

Qualifying competition
4	(Hungary) Zsófia Gubacsi	6	7^{7}
5	(Austria) Barbara Schwartz	2	6^{3}
