= 2005 Moorilla Hobart International =

- Date: 10–14 January
- Edition: 12th
- Category: Tier V
- Draw: 32S / 16D
- Prize money: US$110,000
- Surface: Hard
- Location: Hobart, Australia
- Venue: Hobart International Tennis Centre

Champions

Singles
- (China) Zheng Jie

Doubles
- (China) Yan Zi / (China) Zheng Jie
← 2004 ·	Hobart International	· 2006 →

The 2005 Moorilla Hobart International was a women's tennis tournament played on outdoor hard courts and which was part of the Tier V category of the 2005 WTA Tour. It was the 12th edition of the tournament and took place at the Hobart International Tennis Centre in Hobart, Australia from 10 January until 14 January 2005. Unseeded Zheng Jie won the singles title and earned $16,000 first-prize money.

== Finals ==
=== Singles ===
(China) Zheng Jie defeated (Argentina) Gisela Dulko, 6–2, 6–0

- It was Zheng's first singles title of her career.

=== Doubles ===
(China) Yan Zi / (China) Zheng Jie defeated (Spain) Anabel Medina Garrigues / (Russia) Dinara Safina 6–4, 7–5
