= 2006 Moorilla Hobart International – Singles =

Singles
- 2006 Moorilla Hobart International

Final
- Champion: (Netherlands) Michaëlla Krajicek
- Runner-up: (Czech Republic) Iveta Benešová
- Score: 6–2, 6–1

Details
- Draw: 32
- Seeds: 8

Events
Singles	Doubles
← 2005 ·	Hobart International	· 2007 →

Zheng Jie was the defending champion, but did not compete this year.

Michaëlla Krajicek won the title by defeating Iveta Benešová 6–2, 6–1 in the final.

== Seeds ==
1. (Slovenia) ~~Katarina Srebotnik~~ (withdrew due to a gastroenteritis)
2. (Czech Republic) Klára Koukalová (first round)
3. (Israel) Anna Smashnova (first round)
4. (United States) Amy Frazier (quarterfinals)
5. (Czech Republic) Iveta Benešová (final)
6. (Argentina) Mariana Díaz Oliva (first round)
7. (Spain) Nuria Llagostera Vives (second round)
8. (United States) Jill Craybas (quarterfinals)

== Draw ==
=== Key ===
- Q = Qualifier
- WC = Wild card
- LL = Lucky loser
- Alt = Alternate
- ITF = ITF entry
- PR = Protected ranking
- SR = Special ranking
- SE = Special exempt
- JE = Junior exempt
- JR = Junior Accelerator Programme entrant
- CO = College Accelerator Programme entrant
- NG = Next Gen Accelerator Program entrant
- w/o = Walkover
- r = Retired
- d = Defaulted

=== Finals ===
Semifinals
(Netherlands) Michaëlla Krajicek	6	6
(Croatia) Jelena Kostanić	4	2
5	(Czech Republic) Iveta Benešová	4	7	6
(Italy) Mara Santangelo	6	5	1

Final
(Netherlands) Michaëlla Krajicek	6	6
5	(Czech Republic) Iveta Benešová	2	1

=== Top half ===
First round
LL	(Canada) A Wozniak	4	6	4
WC	(Australia) C Dellacqua	6	2	6
(Russia) E Linetskaya	1	6	2
(Ukraine) A Bondarenko	6	3	6
(Netherlands) M Krajicek	6	6
(Estonia) M Ani	4	4
(France) S Foretz	6	1	7
6	(Argentina) M Díaz Oliva	1	6	5
3	(Israel) A Smashnova	2	3
(United States) L Granville	6	6
(Spain) L Pous Tió	4	6	4
(United States) J Jackson	6	2	6
(Slovakia) M Suchá	4	0
(Croatia) J Kostanić	6	6
(Russia) E Vesnina	0	3
7	(Spain) N Llagostera Vives	6	6

Second round
WC	(Australia) C Dellacqua	6^{2}	4
(Ukraine) A Bondarenko	7^{7}	6
(Netherlands) M Krajicek	3	6	6
(France) S Foretz	6	3	2
(United States) L Granville	2	7	6
(United States) J Jackson	6	5	3
(Croatia) J Kostanić	6	5	6
7	(Spain) N Llagostera Vives	3	7	4

Quarterfinals
(Ukraine) A Bondarenko	2	3
(Netherlands) M Krajicek	6	6
(United States) L Granville	7	4	4
(Croatia) J Kostanić	5	6	6

Semifinals
(Netherlands) M Krajicek	6	6
(Croatia) J Kostanić	4	2

=== Bottom half ===
First round
5	(Czech Republic) I Benešová	6	2	6
(Spain) M Sánchez Lorenzo	3	6	4
(United States) M Washington	6	6
(France) É Loit	3	3
Q	(Spain) A Parra Santonja	2	2
(Puerto Rico) K Brandi	6	6
(Spain) L Domínguez Lino	7^{7}	3	0
4	(United States) A Frazier	6^{2}	6	6
8	(United States) J Craybas	7	7
WC	(Australia) N Pratt	5	5
(France) S Brémond	6	6
Q	(Australia) C Wheeler	2	4
Q	(Russia) O Puchkova	5	5
(Italy) M Santangelo	7	7
Q	(Luxembourg) A Kremer	6	2	6
2	(Czech Republic) K Koukalová	4	6	2

Second round
5	(Czech Republic) I Benešová	6	3	6
(United States) M Washington	2	6	2
(Puerto Rico) K Brandi	6^{3}	3
4	(United States) A Frazier	7^{7}	6
8	(United States) J Craybas	4	6	6
(France) S Brémond	6	2	2
(Italy) M Santangelo	7	6
Q	(Luxembourg) A Kremer	5	1

Quarterfinals
5	(Czech Republic) I Benešová	7^{7}	7^{7}
4	(United States) A Frazier	6^{3}	6^{4}
8	(United States) J Craybas	6	4	4
(Italy) M Santangelo	4	6	6

Semifinals
5	(Czech Republic) I Benešová	4	7	6
(Italy) M Santangelo	6	5	1
