= 2004 Canberra Women's Classic =

- Date: 11–17 January
- Edition: 4th
- Category: Tier V
- Draw: 32S / 16D
- Prize money: $110,000
- Surface: Hard / outdoor
- Location: Canberra, Australia
- Venue: National Sports Club

Champions

Singles
- (Argentina) Paola Suárez

Doubles
- (Croatia) Jelena Kostanić / (Luxembourg) Claudine Schaul
- Canberra International

The 2004 Canberra Women's Classic was a women's tennis tournament played on outdoor hard courts at the National Sports Club in Canberra, Australia and was part of the Tier V category of the 2004 WTA Tour. It was the fourth edition of the tournament and was held from 11 through 17 January 2004. Second-seeded Paola Suárez won the singles title, after surviving five matchpoints in the final, and earned $16,000 first-prize money.

== Finals ==
=== Singles ===
(Argentina) Paola Suárez defeated (Italy) Silvia Farina Elia 3–6, 6–4, 7–6^{(7–5)}

- It was Suárez' 1st singles title of the year and the 4th and last of her career.

=== Doubles ===
(Croatia) Jelena Kostanić / (Luxembourg) Claudine Schaul defeated (France) Caroline Dhenin / (Australia) Lisa McShea 6–4, 7–6^{(7–3)}
