= 2006 Moorilla Hobart International – Doubles =

Doubles
- 2006 Moorilla Hobart International
- 2005 Champion: (China) Yan Zi (China) Zheng Jie

Final
- Champion: (France) Émilie Loit (Australia) Nicole Pratt
- Runner-up: (United States) Jill Craybas (Croatia) Jelena Kostanić
- Score: 6–2, 6–1

Events
Singles	Doubles
← 2005 ·	Moorilla Hobart International	· 2007 →

Yan Zi and Zheng Jie were the defending champions, but did not participate.

Émilie Loit and Nicole Pratt won the title, defeating Jill Craybas and Jelena Kostanić in the final.

== Seeds ==
1. (France) Émilie Loit / (Australia) Nicole Pratt (champions)
2. (Spain) Lourdes Domínguez Lino / (Spain) Nuria Llagostera Vives (first round)
3. (Argentina) María Emilia Salerni / (Venezuela) Milagros Sequera (withdrew)
4. (Italy) Mara Santangelo / (United States) Mashona Washington (semifinals)
5. (United States) Jill Craybas / (Croatia) Jelena Kostanić (final)

== Draw ==
=== Key ===
- Q = Qualifier
- WC = Wild card
- LL = Lucky loser
- Alt = Alternate
- SE = Special exempt
- PR = Protected ranking
- ITF = ITF entry
- JE = Junior exempt
- w/o = Walkover
- r = Retired
- d = Defaulted
- SR = Special ranking

=== Draw ===
First round
1	(France) É Loit (Australia) N Pratt	6	6
(Hungary) ZGubacsi (Russia) A Kudryavtseva	2	3
(Australia) C Dellacqua (United States) L Granville	6	4	7
(Ukraine) A Bondarenko (Russia) E Vesnina	1	6	5
4	(Italy) M Santangelo (United States) M Washington	6	7
(Estonia) M Ani (Romania) A Vanc	4	6^{6}
(France) S Beltrame (France) S Foretz	6	7
(United States) j Ditty (Germany) A Matic	4	5
(Spain) A Parra Santonja (Spain) M Sánchez Lorenzo	6	6
LL	(Argentina) M Díaz Oliva (Canada) A Wozniak	2	4
Q	(Luxembourg) A Kremer (Russia) E Linetskaya	0	4
5	(United States) J Craybas (Croatia) J Kostanić	6	6
(Germany) M Müller (Spain) L Pous Tió	6	6
WC	(Australia) Lisa D'Amelio (Australia) E Hewson	2	3
(Uzbekistan) A Amanmuradova (Israel) A Smashnova	6	7
2	(Spain) L Domínguez Lino (Spain) N Llagostera Vives	4	6^{5}

Quarterfinals
1	(France) É Loit (Australia) N Pratt	2	6	6
(Australia) C Dellacqua (United States) L Granville	6	2	0
4	(Italy) M Santangelo (United States) M Washington	6	6
(France) S Beltrame (France) S Foretz	4	1
(Spain) A Parra Santonja (Spain) M Sánchez Lorenzo	1	2
5	(United States) J Craybas (Croatia) J Kostanić	6	6
(Germany) M Müller (Spain) L Pous Tió	6	7
(Uzbekistan) A Amanmuradova (Israel) A Smashnova	2	6^{4}

Semifinals
1	(France) É Loit (Australia) N Pratt	6	6
4	(Italy) M Santangelo (United States) M Washington	4	3
5	(United States) J Craybas (Croatia) J Kostanić	6	4	6
(Germany) M Müller (Spain) L Pous Tió	1	6	2

Final
1	(France) É Loit (Australia) N Pratt	6	6
5	(United States) J Craybas (Croatia) J Kostanić	2	1

== Qualifying ==
=== Seeds ===
1. (United States) Amy Frazier / (United States) Jamea Jackson (first round)
2. (Czech Republic) Iveta Benešová / (Czech Republic) Klára Koukalová (first round)

=== Qualifiers ===
1. (Luxembourg) Anne Kremer / (Russia) Evgenia Linetskaya

=== Lucky losers ===
1. (Argentina) Mariana Díaz Oliva / (Canada) Aleksandra Wozniak

=== Key ===
- Q = Qualifier
- WC = Wild card
- LL = Lucky loser
- Alt = Alternate
- SE = Special exempt
- PR = Protected ranking
- ITF = ITF entry
- JE = Junior exempt
- w/o = Walkover
- r = Retired
- d = Defaulted
- SR = Special ranking

==== Draw ====
1st round
1	(United States) A Frazier (United States) J Jackson	5
(Argentina) M Díaz Oliva (Canada) A Wozniak	8
WC	(Luxembourg) A Kremer (Russia) E Linetskaya	8
2	(Czech Republic) Iveta Benešová (Czech Republic) K Koukalová	6

Final
(Argentina) M Díaz Oliva (Canada) A Wozniak	6^{5}	6	3
WC	(Luxembourg) A Kremer (Russia) E Linetskaya	7	3	6
