= 2005 Moorilla Hobart International – Singles =

Singles
- 2005 Moorilla Hobart International

Final
- Champion: (China) Zheng Jie
- Runner-up: (Argentina) Gisela Dulko
- Score: 6–2, 6–0

Details
- Draw: 32
- Seeds: 8

Events
Singles	Doubles
← 2004 ·	Hobart International	· 2006 →

Amy Frazier was the defending champion, but lost in the first round to Li Na.

Zheng Jie won the title by defeating Gisela Dulko 6–2, 6–0 in the final.

== Seeds ==
1. (United States) Amy Frazier (first round)
2. (Argentina) Gisela Dulko (final)
3. (Czech Republic) Iveta Benešová (semifinals)
4. (Japan) Shinobu Asagoe (second round)
5. (Spain) Anabel Medina Garrigues (second round)
6. (Italy) Maria Elena Camerin (second round)
7. (Russia) Dinara Safina (second round)
8. (Czech Republic) Klára Koukalová (quarterfinals)

== Draw ==
=== Key ===
- Q = Qualifier
- WC = Wild card
- LL = Lucky loser
- Alt = Alternate
- ITF = ITF entry
- PR = Protected ranking
- SR = Special ranking
- SE = Special exempt
- JE = Junior exempt
- JR = Junior Accelerator Programme entrant
- CO = College Accelerator Programme entrant
- NG = Next Gen Accelerator Program entrant
- w/o = Walkover
- r = Retired
- d = Defaulted

=== Finals ===
Semifinals
(China) Li Na	6	4	0
(China) Zheng Jie	3	6	6
3	(Czech Republic) Iveta Benešová	5	2
2	(Argentina) Gisela Dulko	7	6

Final
(China) Zheng Jie	6	6
2	(Argentina) Gisela Dulko	2	0

=== Top half ===
First round
1	(United States) A Frazier	5	5
(China) N Li	7	7
WC	(Australia) C Dellacqua	7	6
(Russia) A Jidkova	5	4
(Japan) A Morigami	2	5
(Poland) M Domachowska	6	7
Q	(Germany) M Müller	1	4
6	(Italy) ME Camerin	6	6
4	(Japan) S Asagoe	6	6
(Italy) M Santangelo	4	3
(China) J Zheng	7	4	6
(Argentina) M Díaz Oliva	5	6	3
WC	(Australia) D Jeflea	2	2
(Spain) M Marrero	6	6
Q	(Zimbabwe) C Black	3	6	5
8	(Czech Republic) K Koukalová	6	3	7

Second round
(China) N Li	7	6
WC	(Australia) C Dellacqua	6^{1}	0
(Poland) M Domachowska	6	2	6
6	(Italy) ME Camerin	4	6	2
4	(Japan) S Asagoe	2	3
(China) J Zheng	6	6
(Spain) M Marrero	1	5
8	(Czech Republic) K Koukalová	6	7

Quarterfinals
(China) N Li	6	3	6
(Poland) M Domachowska	3	6	1
(China) J Zheng	4	7	6
8	(Czech Republic) K Koukalová	6	6^{2}	2

Semifinals
(China) N Li	6	4	0
(China) J Zheng	3	6	6

=== Bottom half ===
First round
7	(Russia) D Safina	6	6
(United States) L Granville	4	2
(Ukraine) T Perebiynis	6	5	4
(Czech Republic) N Vaidišová	3	7	6
Q	(United States) J Hopkins	4	2
(Czech Republic) B Strýcová	6	6
(Slovakia) Ľ Kurhajcová	1	7	1
3	(Czech Republic) I Benešová	6	6^{1}	6
5	(Spain) A Medina Garrigues	6	6^{2}	6
(Puerto Rico) K Brandi	4	7	3
(Czech Republic) K Peschke	7	6
(Slovakia) M Suchá	6^{5}	2
(United States) A Spears	6	6
(United States) J Craybas	1	3
Q	(China) N Liu	4	3
2	(Argentina) G Dulko	6	6

Second round
7	(Russia) D Safina	1	6	3
(Czech Republic) N Vaidišová	6	4	6
(Czech Republic) B Strýcová	3	6	3
3	(Czech Republic) I Benešová	6	3	6
5	(Spain) A Medina Garrigues	0	2
(Czech Republic) K Peschke	6	6
(United States) A Spears	6	3	2
2	(Argentina) G Dulko	2	6	6

Quarterfinals
(Czech Republic) N Vaidišová	6	4	4
3	(Czech Republic) I Benešová	2	6	6
(Czech Republic) K Peschke	6	4	4
2	(Argentina) G Dulko	2	6	6

Semifinals
3	(Czech Republic) I Benešová	5	2
2	(Argentina) G Dulko	7	6
