= 2004 Moorilla Hobart International – Doubles =

Doubles
- 2004 Moorilla Hobart International

Final
- Champions: (Japan) Shinobu Asagoe (Japan) Seiko Okamoto
- Runners-up: (Belgium) Els Callens (Austria) Barbara Schett
- Score: 2–6, 6–4, 6–3

Events
| Singles | Doubles |
| ← 2003 · | Hobart International | · 2005 → |

Cara Black and Elena Likhovtseva were the defending champions, but none competed this year. Black competed in Sydney at the same week, while Likhovtseva decided to focus only on the singles competition.

Shinobu Asagoe and Seiko Okamoto won the title by defeating Els Callens and Barbara Schett 2–6, 6–4, 6–3 in the final.

== Seeds ==
The first two seeds received a bye into the quarterfinals.

1. (Belgium) Els Callens / (Austria) Barbara Schett (final)
2. (Japan) Nana Miyagi / (United States) Samantha Reeves (quarterfinals, withdrew)
3. (Greece) Eleni Daniilidou / (Italy) Rita Grande (first round, withdrew)
4. (China) Li Ting / (China) Zheng Jie (first round)

== Draw ==
=== Key ===
- Q = Qualifier
- WC = Wild card
- LL = Lucky loser
- Alt = Alternate
- SE = Special exempt
- PR = Protected ranking
- ITF = ITF entry
- JE = Junior exempt
- w/o = Walkover
- r = Retired
- d = Defaulted
- SR = Special ranking

=== Draw ===
First round
(Australia) S Stosur (Australia) C Wheeler | 1 | 6^{5}
(Russia) A Jidkova (Japan) A Morigami | 6 | 7^{7}
3 | (Greece) E Daniilidou (Italy) R Grande
(Italy) T Garbin (United States) L Granville | w/o
(Hungary) M Czink (United States) A Frazier | 6 | 6
(Sweden) H Ejeson (Netherlands) A van den Hurk | 4 | 2
(Italy) ME Camerin (Colombia) F Zuluaga | 6 | 6
(Germany) A Barna (Spain) A Medina Garrigues | 1 | 4
(Japan) S Asagoe (Japan) S Okamoto | 6 | 1 | 6
4 | (China) T Li (China) J Zheng | 2 | 6 | 2
(Puerto Rico) K Brandi (South Africa) K Grant | 1 | 6 | 6
(Australia) L Breadmore (United Kingdom) A Keothavong | 6 | 3 | 3

Quarterfinals
1 | (Belgium) E Callens (Austria) B Schett | 6 | 4 | 7
(Russia) A Jidkova (Japan) A Morigami | 2 | 6 | 5
(Italy) T Garbin (United States) L Granville | 7^{7} | 6
(Hungary) M Czink (United States) A Frazier | 6^{5} | 2
(Italy) ME Camerin (Colombia) F Zuluaga | 4 | 4
(Japan) S Asagoe (Japan) S Okamoto | 6 | 6
(Puerto Rico) K Brandi (South Africa) K Grant | w/o
2 | (Japan) N Miyagi (United States) S Reeves

Semifinals
1 | (Belgium) E Callens (Austria) B Schett | 6 | 6
(Italy) T Garbin (United States) L Granville | 1 | 3
(Japan) S Asagoe (Japan) S Okamoto | 6 | 3 | 6
(Puerto Rico) K Brandi (South Africa) K Grant | 3 | 6 | 4

Final
1 | (Belgium) E Callens (Austria) B Schett | 6 | 4 | 3
(Japan) S Asagoe (Japan) S Okamoto | 2 | 6 | 6
