= 2004 Moorilla Hobart International =

- Date: 12–16 January
- Edition: 11th
- Category: Tier V
- Draw: 32S / 16D
- Prize money: $110,000
- Surface: Hard
- Location: Hobart, Australia
- Venue: Hobart International Tennis Centre

Champions

Singles
- (United States) Amy Frazier

Doubles
- (Japan) Shinobu Asagoe / (Japan) Seiko Okamoto
← 2003 ·	Hobart International	· 2005 →

The 2004 Moorilla Hobart International was a women's tennis tournament played on outdoor hard courts and which was part of the Tier V category of the 2004 WTA Tour. It was the 11th edition of the tournament and took place at the Hobart International Tennis Centre in Hobart, Australia from 12 January until 16 January 2004. Unseeded Amy Frazier won the singles title and earned $16,000 first-prize money.

== Finals ==
=== Singles ===
(United States) Amy Frazier defeated (Japan) Shinobu Asagoe, 6–3, 6–3

- It was Frazier's 1st singles title of the year and the 7th of her career.

=== Doubles ===
(Japan) Shinobu Asagoe / (Japan) Seiko Okamoto defeated (Belgium) Els Callens / (Austria) Barbara Schett 2–6, 6–4, 6–3
