= 2004 Canberra Women's Classic – Doubles =

Doubles
- 2004 Canberra Women's Classic

Final
- Champions: (Croatia) Jelena Kostanić (Luxembourg) Claudine Schaul
- Runners-up: (France) Caroline Dhenin (Australia) Lisa McShea
- Score: 6–4, 7–6^{(7–3)}

Details
- Draw: 16
- Seeds: 4

Events
Singles	Doubles
- Canberra International

Tathiana Garbin and Émilie Loit were the defending champions, but Garbin opted to compete in Hobart that same week. Loit teamed up with Stéphanie Cohen-Aloro and withdrew the tournament in semifinals.

Jelena Kostanić and Claudine Schaul won the title by defeating Caroline Dhenin and Lisa McShea 6–4, 7–6^{(7–3)} in the final.

== Seeds ==
1. (Switzerland) Emmanuelle Gagliardi / (Hungary) Petra Mandula (semifinals)
2. (France) Stéphanie Cohen-Aloro / (France) Émilie Loit (semifinals, withdrew)
3. (Spain) Conchita Martínez Granados / (Venezuela) Milagros Sequera (first round)
4. (France) Caroline Dhenin / (Australia) Lisa McShea (final)

== Draw ==
Key

- Q = Qualifier
- WC = Wild card
- LL = Lucky loser
- Alt = Alternate
- ITF = ITF entry
- PR = Protected ranking
- SR = Special ranking
- SE = Special exempt
- JE = Junior exempt
- JR = Junior Accelerator Programme entrant
- CO = College Accelerator Programme entrant
- NG = Next Gen Accelerator Program entrant
- w/o = Walkover
- r = Retired
- d = Defaulted

=== Draw ===
First round
1	(Switzerland) E Gagliardi (Hungary) P Mandula	6	1
(Tunisia) S Sfar (Netherlands) C Vis	2	0^{r}
WC	(Australia) M Dittmann (Australia) A Grahame	3	2
(Australia) C Dellacqua (Australia) N Sewell	6	6
3	(Spain) C Martínez Granados (Venezuela) M Sequera	3	5
(Australia) T Musgrave (Japan) S Obata	6	7
(Croatia) J Kostanić (Luxembourg) C Schaul	7^{11}	7
(Argentina) C Fernández (Italy) F Pennetta	6^{9}	5
LL	(Switzerland) MG Mikaelian (Ukraine) J Vakulenko	0	4
(Italy) Ad Serra Zanetti (Italy) An Serra Zanetti	6	6
(United States) A Augustus (United States) J Embry	3	6^{6}
4	(France) C Dhenin (Australia) L McShea	6	7^{8}
Q	(Sweden) S Arvidsson (Russia) A Rodionova	7	1	6
(Slovakia) Ľ Kurhajcová (Spain) A Parra Santonja	5	6	1
(Russia) T Panova (Serbia and Montenegro) D Zarić	4	2
2	(France) S Cohen-Aloro (France) É Loit	6	6

Quarterfinals
1	(Switzerland) E Gagliardi (Hungary) P Mandula	6	6
(Australia) C Dellacqua (Australia) N Sewell	1	2
(Australia) T Musgrave (Japan) S Obata	5	6	3
(Croatia) J Kostanić (Luxembourg) C Schaul	7	3	6
(Italy) Ad Serra Zanetti (Italy) An Serra Zanetti	6	6^{4}	5
4	(France) C Dhenin (Australia) L McShea	3	7^{7}	7
Q	(Sweden) S Arvidsson (Russia) A Rodionova
2	(France) S Cohen-Aloro (France) É Loit	w/o

Semifinals
1	(Switzerland) E Gagliardi (Hungary) P Mandula	2	3
(Croatia) J Kostanić (Luxembourg) C Schaul	6	6
4	(France) C Dhenin (Australia) L McShea	w/o
2	(France) S Cohen-Aloro (France) É Loit

Final
(Croatia) J Kostanić (Luxembourg) C Schaul	6	7^{7}
4	(France) C Dhenin (Australia) L McShea	4	6^{3}
