= 2001 Canberra International – Singles =

Singles
- 2001 Canberra International

Final
- Champion: (Belgium) Justine Henin
- Runner-up: (France) Sandrine Testud
- Score: 6–2, 6–2

Details
- Draw: 30
- Seeds: 8

Events
| Singles | Doubles |
- Canberra International

Justine Henin won in the final 6–2, 6–2 against Sandrine Testud.

== Seeds ==
A champion seed is indicated in bold text while text in italics indicates the round in which that seed was eliminated. The top two seeds received a bye to the second round.

1. (France) Mary Pierce (semifinals)
2. (Russia) Elena Dementieva (quarterfinals)
3. (United States) Chanda Rubin (quarterfinals)
4. (France) Sandrine Testud (final)
5. (Bulgaria) Magdalena Maleeva (second round)
6. (Switzerland) Patty Schnyder (second round)
7. (France) Nathalie Dechy (semifinals)
8. (Croatia) Silvija Talaja (first round)

== Draw ==
Key

- Q = Qualifier
- WC = Wild card
- LL = Lucky loser
- Alt = Alternate
- ITF = ITF entry
- PR = Protected ranking
- SR = Special ranking
- SE = Special exempt
- JE = Junior exempt
- JR = Junior Accelerator Programme entrant
- CO = College Accelerator Programme entrant
- NG = Next Gen Accelerator Program entrant
- w/o = Walkover
- r = Retired
- d = Defaulted

=== Final ===
| Final |
| 4 | (France) Sandrine Testud | 2 | 2 |
| | (Belgium) **Justine Henin** | **6** | **6** |

=== Section 1 ===
First round
WC | (Australia) A Ellwood | 3 | **6** | 6^{3}
WC | (Australia) **A Grahame** | **6** | 3 | **7^{7}**
(South Africa) **J Kruger** | **6** | **7^{7}**
(Spain) M Serna | 4 | 6^{2}
Q | (Indonesia) **W Prakusya** | **6** | **1**
8 | (Croatia) S Talaja | 1 | 0 | r
4 | (France) **S Testud** | 3 | **7^{7}** | **6**
(Germany) J Kandarr | **6** | 6^{3} | 4
Q | (Czech Republic) L Němečková | 2 | 2
(Spain) **Á Montolio** | **6** | **6**
(Japan) **A Sugiyama** | **6** | **6**
(Japan) S Asagoe | 4 | 2
(Sweden) Å Carlsson | **6** | 6^{5} | 0
6 | (Switzerland) **P Schnyder** | 3 | **7^{7}** | **6**

Second round
1 | (France) **M Pierce** | **6** | **6**
WC | (Australia) A Grahame | 1 | 2
(South Africa) **J Kruger** | **6** | **6**
Q | (Indonesia) W Prakusya | 4 | 4
4 | (France) **S Testud** | **6** | **7^{7}**
(Spain) Á Montolio | 2 | 6^{4}
(Japan) **A Sugiyama** | **6** | 3 | **7**
6 | (Switzerland) P Schnyder | 0 | **6** | 5

Quarterfinals
1 | (France) **M Pierce** | **6** | **6**
(South Africa) J Kruger | 3 | 0
4 | (France) **S Testud** | **7^{10}** | 4 | **6**
(Japan) A Sugiyama | 6^{8} | **6** | 3

Semifinals
1 | (France) M Pierce | 2 | 2
4 | (France) **S Testud** | **6** | **6**

=== Section 2 ===
First round
5 | (Bulgaria) **M Maleeva** | 4 | **6** | **2**
(Argentina) P Suárez | **6** | 3 | 0^{r}
(Belgium) **J Henin** | **6** | **6**
(Canada) S Jeyaseelan | 2 | 3
(Slovakia) **H Nagyová** | **6** | **6**
(Hungary) R Kuti-Kis | 1 | 1
(Netherlands) K Boogert | 4 | 6^{7}
3 | (United States) **C Rubin** | **6** | **7^{9}**
7 | (France) **N Dechy** | **7^{7}** | **6**
(Netherlands) M Oremans | 6^{1} | 3
(Austria) S Plischke | 2 | 0
(Czech Republic) **D Bedáňová** | **6** | **6**
Q | (Japan) Y Yoshida | **6** | 5 | 5
Q | (Tunisia) **S Sfar** | 4 | **7** | **7**

Second round
5 | (Bulgaria) M Maleeva | 2 | 3
(Belgium) **J Henin** | **6** | **6**
(Slovakia) H Nagyová | 2 | 4
3 | (United States) **C Rubin** | **6** | **6**
7 | (France) **N Dechy** | **6** | 4 | **6**
(Czech Republic) D Bedáňová | 3 | **6** | 3
Q | (Tunisia) S Sfar | 1 | 6^{3}
2 | (Russia) **E Dementieva** | **6** | **7^{7}**

Quarterfinals
(Belgium) **J Henin** | **6** | **6**
3 | (United States) C Rubin | 2 | 3
7 | (France) **N Dechy** | **6** | 4 | **6**
2 | (Russia) E Dementieva | 2 | **6** | 4

Semifinals
(Belgium) **J Henin** | **6** | **6**
7 | (France) N Dechy | 2 | 4

== Qualifying ==
=== Seeds ===
1. (Croatia) Iva Majoli (first round)
2. (Japan) Shinobu Asagoe (withdrew, moved to the Main Draw)
3. n/a
4. (Slovakia) Karina Habšudová (second round)
5. (United States) Marissa Irvin (first round)
6. (Belarus) Nadejda Ostrovskaya (first round)
7. (Chinese Taipei) Janet Lee (final round)
8. (United States) Dawn Buth (first round)
9. (Slovakia) Ľudmila Cervanová (final round)
10. (Japan) **Yuka Yoshida (Qualifier)**

=== Qualifiers ===
1. **(Indonesia) Wynne Prakusya**
2. **(Tunisia) Selima Sfar**
3. **(Japan) Yuka Yoshida**
4. **(Czech Republic) Lenka Němečková**

=== Draw ===
==== First qualifier ====
First round
1 | (Croatia) Iva Majoli | 5 | **6** | 3
(Germany) **Gréta Arn** | **7** | 3 | **6**
(Indonesia) **Wynne Prakusya** | **6** | 5 | **6**
(Hungary) Petra Mandula | 3 | **7** | 0
WC | (Australia) Nadia Johnston | 3 | **6** | 4
(Spain) **Ainhoa Goñi** | **6** | 2 | **6**
(Germany) Miriam Schnitzer | 4 | 0
7 | (Chinese Taipei) **Janet Lee** | **6** | **6**

Second round
(Germany) Gréta Arn | 4 | 3
(Indonesia) **Wynne Prakusya** | **6** | **6**
(Spain) Ainhoa Goñi | 2 | 1
7 | (Chinese Taipei) **Janet Lee** | **6** | **6**

Final Round
(Indonesia) **Wynne Prakusya** | **6** | 1 | **6**
7 | (Chinese Taipei) Janet Lee | 4 | **6** | 3

==== Second qualifier ====
First round
9 | (Slovakia) **Ľudmila Cervanová** | **7** | **6**
(United Kingdom) Lucie Ahl | 5 | 3
(South Korea) **Yoon-Jeong Cho** | **6** | **6**
(Denmark) Eva Dyrberg | 4 | 0
(Tunisia) **Selima Sfar** | 6^{2} | **6** | **6**
(Spain) María José Martínez | **7^{7}** | 2 | 4
(Spain) **Gisela Riera** | **6** | **6**
8 | (United States) Dawn Buth | 1 | 1

Second round
9 | (Slovakia) **Ľudmila Cervanová** | **7** | **6**
(South Korea) Yoon-Jeong Cho | 5 | 3
(Tunisia) **Selima Sfar** | **6** | **6**
(Spain) Gisela Riera | 2 | 0

Final Round
9 | (Slovakia) Ľudmila Cervanová | 0 | 3
(Tunisia) **Selima Sfar** | **6** | **6**

==== Third qualifier ====
First round
10 | (Japan) **Yuka Yoshida** | **6** | **6**
(Spain) Eva Bes | 3 | 2
(Italy) **Francesca Lubiani** | 2 | **6** | **6**
WC | (Australia) Monique Adamczak | **6** | 2 | 4
WC | (Australia) Kristen van Elden | **6** | 3 | 6^{3}
(Hungary) **Zsófia Gubacsi** | 2 | **6** | **7^{7}**
(Czech Republic) **Sandra Kleinová** | **7** | **6**
6 | (Belarus) Nadejda Ostrovskaya | 5 | 3

Second round
10 | (Japan) **Yuka Yoshida** | **6** | 5 | **6**
(Italy) Francesca Lubiani | 4 | **7** | 1
(Hungary) **Zsófia Gubacsi** | 2 | **7^{7}** | **6**
(Czech Republic) Sandra Kleinová | **6** | 6^{5} | 1

Final Round
10 | (Japan) **Yuka Yoshida** | **6** | **6**
(Hungary) Zsófia Gubacsi | 3 | 0

==== Fourth qualifier ====
First round
4 | (Slovakia) **Karina Habšudová** | 6^{4} | **7** | **6**
(Slovenia) Tina Hergold | **7^{7}** | 5 | 1
(Slovenia) **Maja Matevžič** | **6** | **6**
WC | (Australia) Mireille Dittmann | 2 | 3
(Czech Republic) **Lenka Němečková** | **6** | **7**
(Ukraine) Tatiana Perebiynis | 1 | 5
(Austria) Evelyn Fauth | 3 | **6** | 2
5 | (United States) **Marissa Irvin** | **6** | 4 | **6**

Second round
4 | (Slovakia) Karina Habšudová | **6** | 4 | 5
(Slovenia) **Maja Matevžič** | 2 | **6** | **7**
(Czech Republic) **Lenka Němečková** | **7^{7}** | **6**
5 | (United States) Marissa Irvin | 6^{5} | 1

Final Round
(Slovenia) Maja Matevžič | 5 | 2
(Czech Republic) **Lenka Němečková** | **7** | **6**
