= 2002 Canberra Women's Classic – Doubles =

Australian women's tennis tournament

Doubles
- 2002 Canberra Women's Classic

Final
- Champions: (South Africa) Nannie de Villiers (Kazakhstan) Irina Selyutina
- Runners-up: (United States) Samantha Reeves (Italy) Adriana Serra Zanetti
- Score: 6–2, 6–3

Details
- Draw: 16
- Seeds: 4

Events
Singles	Doubles
- Canberra Women's Classic

Nicole Arendt and Ai Sugiyama were the defending champions, but Arendt chose not to participate and Sugiyama chose to participate in Sydney instead.

The unseeded team of Nannie de Villiers and Irina Selyutina won the title, defeating Samantha Reeves and Adriana Serra Zanetti in the final, 6–2, 6–3.

== Seeds ==
1. (Russia) Elena Likhovtseva / (France) Émilie Loit (quarterfinals)
2. (Australia) Rachel McQuillan / (United States) Katie Schlukebir (first round)
3. (Croatia) Iva Majoli / (Switzerland) Patty Schnyder (first round, withdrew)
4. (United States) Lilia Osterloh / (Germany) Barbara Rittner (withdrew)

== Draw ==
Key

- Q = Qualifier
- WC = Wild card
- LL = Lucky loser
- Alt = Alternate
- ITF = ITF entry
- PR = Protected ranking
- SR = Special ranking
- SE = Special exempt
- JE = Junior exempt
- JR = Junior Accelerator Programme entrant
- CO = College Accelerator Programme entrant
- NG = Next Gen Accelerator Program entrant
- w/o = Walkover
- r = Retired
- d = Defaulted

=== Draw ===
First round
1	(Russia) E Likhovtseva (France) É Loit	6	6
(Greece) E Daniilidou (Germany) C Schneider	4	2
WC	(Australia) A Grahame (Australia) C Watson	3	2
(South Africa) N de Villiers (Kazakhstan) I Selyutina	6	6
3	(Croatia) I Majoli (Switzerland) P Schnyder
(France) N Dechy (Thailand) T Tanasugarn	w/o
Q	(Japan) A Morigami (Japan) M Saeki	4	6^{3}
(Australia) E Dominikovic (Australia) A Ellwood	6	7
(United States) A Augustus (United States) J Embry	6	6
(Slovakia) K Habšudová (Czech Republic) L Němečková	3	4
(Japan) R Hiraki (Japan) N Miyagi	5	7	3
LL	(United Kingdom) L Ahl (Tunisia) S Sfar	6	6^{6}	6
(Luxembourg) A Kremer (Australia) T Musgrave	4	2
(Spain) E Bes (Slovenia) M Matevžič	6	6
(United States) S Reeves (Italy) A Serra Zanetti	6	6
2	(Australia) R McQuillan (United States) K Schlukebir	3	1

Quarterfinals
1	(Russia) E Likhovtseva (France) É Loit	6	1	6
(South Africa) N de Villiers (Kazakhstan) I Selyutina	4	6	4
(France) N Dechy (Thailand) T Tanasugarn	6	6
(Australia) E Dominikovic (Australia) A Ellwood	2	3
(United States) A Augustus (United States) J Embry	6	7
LL	(United Kingdom) L Ahl (Tunisia) S Sfar	3	5
(Spain) E Bes (Slovenia) M Matevžič	3	0
(United States) S Reeves (Italy) A Serra Zanetti	6	6

Semifinals
(South Africa) N de Villiers (Kazakhstan) I Selyutina	6	6
(France) N Dechy (Thailand) T Tanasugarn	2	3
(United States) A Augustus (United States) J Embry	3	1
(United States) S Reeves (Italy) A Serra Zanetti	6	6

Final
(South Africa) N de Villiers (Kazakhstan) I Selyutina	6	6
(United States) S Reeves (Italy) A Serra Zanetti	2	3

== Qualifying ==
=== Seeds ===
1. (United States) Jill Craybas / (Hungary) Zsófia Gubacsi (first round)
2. (Japan) Akiko Morigami / (Japan) Miho Saeki (qualified)

=== Qualifiers ===
1. (Japan) Akiko Morigami / (Japan) Miho Saeki

=== Lucky losers ===
1. (United Kingdom) Lucie Ahl / (Tunisia) Selima Sfar

=== Qualifying draw ===
First round
1	(United States) Jill Craybas (Hungary) Zsófia Gubacsi	0
(United Kingdom) Lucie Ahl (Tunisia) Selima Sfar	8
(Australia) Beti Sekulovski (Australia) Nicole Sewell	6
2	(Japan) Akiko Morigami (Japan) Miho Saeki	8

Qualifying competition
(United Kingdom) Lucie Ahl (Tunisia) Selima Sfar	2	6	6^{1}
2	(Japan) Akiko Morigami (Japan) Miho Saeki	6	1	7^{7}
