= 2004 Canberra Women's Classic – Singles =

Singles
- 2004 Canberra Women's Classic

Final
- Champion: (Argentina) Paola Suárez
- Runner-up: (Italy) Silvia Farina Elia
- Score: 3–6, 6–4, 7–6^{(7–5)}

Details
- Draw: 32
- Seeds: 8

Events
Singles	Doubles
- Canberra International

Meghann Shaughnessy was the defending singles champion, but decided to compete in Sydney.

Second-seeded Paola Suárez won the title by defeating Silvia Farina Elia 3–6, 6–4, 7–6^{(7–5)} in the final.

== Seeds ==
1. (Russia) ~~Nadia Petrova~~ (withdrew)
2. (Argentina) Paola Suárez (champion)
3. (Italy) Silvia Farina Elia (final)
4. (Thailand) Tamarine Tanasugarn (second round)
5. (Hungary) Petra Mandula (first round)
6. (France) Émilie Loit (quarterfinals)
7. (Germany) Marlene Weingärtner (second round, withdrew)
8. (Japan) Saori Obata (first round)
9. (Spain) María Sánchez Lorenzo (quarterfinals)

== Draw ==
Key

- Q = Qualifier
- WC = Wild card
- LL = Lucky loser
- Alt = Alternate
- ITF = ITF entry
- PR = Protected ranking
- SR = Special ranking
- SE = Special exempt
- JE = Junior exempt
- JR = Junior Accelerator Programme entrant
- CO = College Accelerator Programme entrant
- NG = Next Gen Accelerator Program entrant
- w/o = Walkover
- r = Retired
- d = Defaulted

=== Finals ===
Semifinals
3	(Italy) Silvia Farina Elia	6	7^{7}
(Ukraine) Julia Vakulenko	3	6^{5}
(Croatia) Karolina Šprem	2	6	4
2	(Argentina) Paola Suárez	6	2	6

Final
3	(Italy) Silvia Farina Elia	6	4	6^{5}
2	(Argentina) Paola Suárez	3	6	7^{7}

=== Top half ===
First round
3	(Italy) S Farina Elia	6	6
(Slovakia) Ľ Kurhajcová	2	2
Q	(Italy) M Santangelo	6	3	6
(Sweden) S Arvidsson	1	6	1
(France) S Cohen-Aloro	3	4
(Switzerland) E Gagliardi	6	6
WC	(Australia) E Dominikovic	7^{7}	4	0
9	(Spain) M Sánchez Lorenzo	6^{5}	6	6
4	(Thailand) T Tanasugarn	6	6
(Switzerland) MG Mikaelian	1	3
(Argentina) N Gussoni	2	3
(Italy) F Pennetta	6	6
(Ukraine) J Vakulenko	6	7^{7}
(Luxembourg) C Schaul	1	6^{5}
(Czech Republic) Z Ondrášková	6	6
8	(Japan) S Obata	3	0

Second round
3	(Italy) S Farina Elia	6	6
Q	(Italy) M Santangelo	3	3
(Switzerland) E Gagliardi	5	6	4
9	(Spain) M Sánchez Lorenzo	7	4	6
4	(Thailand) T Tanasugarn	5	2
(Italy) F Pennetta	7	6
(Ukraine) J Vakulenko	7^{7}	2	6
(Czech Republic) Z Ondrášková	6^{4}	6	2

Quarterfinals
3	(Italy) S Farina Elia	6	1	6
9	(Spain) M Sánchez Lorenzo	3	6	3
(Italy) F Pennetta	4	4
(Ukraine) J Vakulenko	6	6

Semifinals
3	(Italy) S Farina Elia	6	7^{7}
(Ukraine) J Vakulenko	3	6^{5}

=== Bottom half ===
First round
6	(France) É Loit	6	6
(Argentina) C Fernández	4	0
LL	(Spain) C Martínez Granados	6	4	7^{7}
(Croatia) J Kostanić	4	6	6^{5}
(Spain) V Ruano Pascual	6	6
(Venezuela) M Sequera	2	4
(Croatia) K Šprem	6	6
5	(Hungary) P Mandula	4	1
7	(Germany) M Weingärtner	6	7
Q	(Israel) T Obziler	4	5
(Spain) A Parra Santonja	6	6
WC	(Australia) M Adamczak	1	4
Q	(Russia) T Panova	4	3
(Czech Republic) S Kleinová	6	6
Q	(Italy) An Serra Zanetti	3	6	1
2	(Argentina) P Suárez	6	2	6

Second round
6	(France) É Loit	6	6
LL	(Spain) C Martínez Granados	3	2
(Spain) V Ruano Pascual	6	1	3
(Croatia) K Šprem	4	6	6
7	(Germany) M Weingärtner
(Spain) A Parra Santonja	w/o
(Czech Republic) S Kleinová
2	(Argentina) P Suárez	w/o

Quarterfinals
6	(France) É Loit	4	4
(Croatia) K Šprem	6	6
(Spain) A Parra Santonja	2	2
2	(Argentina) P Suárez	6	6

Semifinals
(Croatia) K Šprem	2	6	4
2	(Argentina) P Suárez	6	2	6
