= 2003 Moorilla Hobart International =

- Date: 6–12 January
- Edition: 10th
- Category: Tier V
- Draw: 32S / 16D
- Prize money: $110,000
- Surface: Hard
- Location: Hobart, Australia

Champions

Singles
- (Australia) Alicia Molik

Doubles
- (Zimbabwe) Cara Black / (Russia) Elena Likhovtseva
- Hobart International

The 2003 Moorilla Hobart International was a women's tennis tournament played on outdoor hard courts. It was the 10th edition of the event and part of the Tier V category of the 2003 WTA Tour. It took place at the Hobart International Tennis Centre in Hobart, Australia from 6 through 12 January 2003. Alicia Molik won the singles title.

== Finals ==
=== Singles ===
(Australia) Alicia Molik defeated (United States) Amy Frazier, 6–2, 4–6, 6–4

- It was Molik's first singles title of her career.

=== Doubles ===
(Zimbabwe) Cara Black / (Russia) Elena Likhovtseva defeated (Austria) Barbara Schett / (Austria) Patricia Wartusch

== Singles main-draw entrants ==
=== Seeds ===
Country	Player	Rank^{1}	Seed
SLO	Katarina Srebotnik	36	1
USA	Amy Frazier	39	2
AUT	Barbara Schett	40	3
RUS	Elena Likhovtseva	42	4
RUS	Vera Zvonareva	45	5
ITA	Rita Grande	46	6
ZIM	Cara Black	56	7
USA	Jill Craybas	57	8

- ^{1} Rankings as of 16 December 2002.

=== Other entrants ===
The following players received wildcards into the singles main draw:

- (Australia) Cindy Watson
- (Australia) Tiffany Welford

The following players received entry from the qualifying draw:

- (Japan) Shinobu Asagoe
- (Hungary) Zsófia Gubacsi
- (Republic of Ireland) Kelly Liggan
- (Ukraine) Tatiana Perebiynis

=== Withdrawals ===
- (Ukraine) Tatiana Perebiynis (food poisoning)

== Doubles main-draw entrants ==
=== Seeds ===
Country	Player	Country	Player	Rank^{1}	Seed
ZIM	Cara Black	RUS	Elena Likhovtseva	19	1
AUT	Barbara Schett	AUT	Patricia Wartusch	63	2
BEL	Els Callens	SWE	Åsa Svensson	81	3
HUN	Petra Mandula	GER	Barbara Rittner	102	4

- ^{1} Rankings as of 16 December 2002.

=== Other entrants ===
The following players received wildcards into the singles main draw:

- (South Africa) Kim Grant / (Australia) Deanna Roberts

The following players received entry from the qualifying draw:

- (Argentina) Mariana Díaz Oliva / (Russia) Vera Zvonareva
