= 2003 Moorilla Hobart International – Doubles =

Doubles
- 2003 Moorilla Hobart International

Final
- Champion: (Zimbabwe) Cara Black (Russia) Elena Likhovtseva
- Runner-up: (Austria) Barbara Schett (Austria) Patricia Wartusch
- Score: 7-5, 7-6^{(7-1)}

Events
Singles	Doubles
← 2002 ·	Moorilla Hobart International	· 2004 →

Tathiana Garbin and Rita Grande were the defending champions. Garbin did not participate, whilst Grande partnered Emmanuelle Gagliardi, losing in the first round.

The title was won by Cara Black and Elena Likhovtseva who defeated Barbara Schett and Patricia Wartusch in straight sets in the final.

== Seeds ==
1. (Zimbabwe) Cara Black / (Russia) Elena Likhovtseva (champions)
2. (Austria) Barbara Schett / (Austria) Patricia Wartusch (final)
3. (Belgium) Els Callens / (Sweden) Åsa Svensson (semifinals)
4. (Hungary) Petra Mandula / (Germany) Barbara Rittner (semifinals)

== Draw ==
=== Key ===
- Q = Qualifier
- WC = Wild card
- LL = Lucky loser
- Alt = Alternate
- SE = Special exempt
- PR = Protected ranking
- ITF = ITF entry
- JE = Junior exempt
- w/o = Walkover
- r = Retired
- d = Defaulted
- SR = Special ranking

=== Draw ===
First round
1	(Zimbabwe) C Black (Russia) E Likhovtseva	6	6
(Germany) K Freye (Germany) A Roesch	2	0
(Czech Republic) I Benešová (Slovakia) H Nagyová	3	5
(South Africa) N de Villiers (Russia) A Jidkova	6	7
4	(Hungary) P Mandula (Germany) B Rittner	4	7	6^{3}
(Australia) A Molik (Paraguay) R Neffa de los Ríos	6	6	2
Q	(Argentina) M Díaz Oliva (Russia) V Zvonareva	4	4
(Spain) M Marrero (Italy) A Serra Zanetti	6	6
(United States) A Frazier (United States) E Schmidt	4	6	7
(Switzerland) E Gagliardi (Italy) R Grande	6	0	6^{7}
(Spain) MJ Martínez (Spain) A Medina Garrigues	2	4
3	(Belgium) E Callens (Sweden) Å Svensson	6	6
(United States) A Augustus (United States) A Spears	6	6
(Austria) B Schwartz (Germany) J Wöhr	4	2
WC	(South Africa) K Grant (Australia) D Roberts	6	5	1
2	(Austria) B Schett (Austria) P Wartusch	3	7	6

Quarter-finals
1	(Zimbabwe) C Black (Russia) E Likhovtseva	6	6
(South Africa) N de Villiers (Russia) A Jidkova	2	4
4	(Hungary) P Mandula (Germany) B Rittner	6	6
(Spain) M Marrero (Italy) A Serra Zanetti	3	2
(United States) A Frazier (United States) E Schmidt	6	5	1
3	(Belgium) E Callens (Sweden) Å Svensson	4	7	6
(United States) A Augustus (United States) A Spears	1	6^{2}
2	(Austria) B Schett (Austria) P Wartusch	6	7

Semi-finals
1	(Zimbabwe) C Black (Russia) E Likhovtseva	6	6
4	(Hungary) P Mandula (Germany) B Rittner	3	0
3	(Belgium) E Callens (Sweden) Å Svensson	2	6	3
2	(Austria) B Schett (Austria) P Wartusch	6	3	6

Final
1	(Zimbabwe) C Black (Russia) E Likhovtseva	7	7
2	(Austria) B Schett (Austria) P Wartusch	5	6^{1}

== Qualifying ==
=== Seeds ===
1. (Ukraine) Alona Bondarenko / (Ukraine) Valeria Bondarenko (qualifying competition)
2. (Argentina) Mariana Díaz Oliva / (Russia) Vera Zvonareva (qualified)

=== Qualifiers ===
1. (Argentina) Mariana Díaz Oliva / (Russia) Vera Zvonareva

=== Draw ===
First round			Qualifying competition
			1	(Ukraine) A Bondarenko (Ukraine) V Bondarenko	7
	(United States) J Craybas (United States) S Taylor	4	2	(Argentina) M Díaz Oliva (Russia) V Zvonareva	9
2	(Argentina) M Díaz Oliva (Russia) V Zvonareva	8
