= 2004 Moorilla Hobart International – Singles =

Singles
- 2004 Moorilla Hobart International

Final
- Champion: (United States) Amy Frazier
- Runner-up: (Japan) Shinobu Asagoe
- Score: 6–3, 6–3

Details
- Draw: 32
- Seeds: 8

Events
| Singles | Doubles |
| ← 2003 · | Hobart International | · 2005 → |

Alicia Molik was the reigning champion, but did not compete in 2004.

Amy Frazier won the title by defeating Shinobu Asagoe 6–3, 6–3 in the final.

== Seeds ==
1. (Greece) Eleni Daniilidou (first round, retired)
2. (Russia) Svetlana Kuznetsova (first round)
3. (Russia) Elena Likhovtseva (first round)
4. (Colombia) Fabiola Zuluaga (quarterfinals)
5. (Venezuela) María Vento-Kabchi (second round)
6. (Japan) Shinobu Asagoe (final)
7. (Germany) Anca Barna (quarterfinals)
8. (United States) Laura Granville (first round)

== Draw ==
=== Key ===
- Q = Qualifier
- WC = Wild card
- LL = Lucky loser
- Alt = Alternate
- ITF = ITF entry
- PR = Protected ranking
- SR = Special ranking
- SE = Special exempt
- JE = Junior exempt
- JR = Junior Accelerator Programme entrant
- CO = College Accelerator Programme entrant
- NG = Next Gen Accelerator Program entrant
- w/o = Walkover
- r = Retired
- d = Defaulted

=== Finals ===
Semifinals
(Puerto Rico) Kristina Brandi | 7 | 4 | 4
6 | (Japan) Shinobu Asagoe | 5 | 6 | 6
(United States) Amy Frazier | 4 | 6 | 6
Q | (Argentina) María Emilia Salerni | 6 | 3 | 2

Final
6 | (Japan) Shinobu Asagoe | 3 | 3
(United States) Amy Frazier | 6 | 6

=== Top half ===
First round
1 | (Greece) E Daniilidou | 5 | 0^{r}
(Italy) T Garbin | 7 | 2
WC | (Australia) C Wheeler | 1 | 2
(Puerto Rico) K Brandi | 6 | 6
(Slovakia) M Suchá | 6 | 2
(United States) S Reeves | 3 | 2^{r}
(Japan) A Morigami | 6 | 6
8 | (United States) L Granville | 2 | 4
4 | (Colombia) F Zuluaga | 6 | 6
(China) J Zheng | 4 | 4
(Hungary) M Czink | 4 | 1
WC | (Australia) S Stosur | 6 | 6
(Italy) R Grande | 6^{2} | 6 | 6
Q | (United Kingdom) A Keothavong | 7^{7} | 2 | 3
(Belgium) E Callens | 3 | 3
6 | (Japan) S Asagoe | 6 | 6

Second round
(Italy) T Garbin | 2 | 2
(Puerto Rico) K Brandi | 6 | 6
(Slovakia) M Suchá | 5 | 2
(Japan) A Morigami | 7 | 6
4 | (Colombia) F Zuluaga | 4 | 6 | 6
WC | (Australia) S Stosur | 6 | 3 | 1
(Italy) R Grande | 1 | 5
6 | (Japan) S Asagoe | 6 | 7

Quarterfinals
(Puerto Rico) K Brandi | 6 | 6
(Japan) A Morigami | 3 | 4
4 | (Colombia) F Zuluaga | 2 | 4
6 | (Japan) S Asagoe | 6 | 6

Semifinals
(Puerto Rico) K Brandi | 7 | 4 | 4
6 | (Japan) S Asagoe | 5 | 6 | 6

=== Bottom half ===
First round
5 | (Venezuela) M Vento-Kabchi | 4 | 6 | 7
(Austria) B Schett | 6 | 2 | 5
(Italy) ME Camerin | 6^{5} | 7^{7} | 7^{9}
(Slovakia) Ľ Cervanová | 7^{7} | 6^{3} | 7^{7}
(Russia) G Voskoboeva | 3 | 2
(Spain) A Medina Garrigues | 6 | 6
(United States) A Frazier | 6 | 6
3 | (Russia) E Likhovtseva | 2 | 3
7 | (Germany) A Barna | 6 | 7^{8}
(United States) A Harkleroad | 1 | 6^{6}
LL | (Czech Republic) I Benešová | 3 | 0
Q | (United States) M Washington | 6 | 6
(Czech Republic) K Koukalová | 6 | 7
Q | (Japan) Y Yoshida | 2 | 5
Q | (Argentina) ME Salerni | 6 | 6
2 | (Russia) S Kuznetsova | 1 | 1

Second round
5 | (Venezuela) M Vento-Kabchi | 6^{7} | 6 | 1
(Italy) ME Camerin | 7^{9} | 2 | 6
(Spain) A Medina Garrigues | 1 | 4
(United States) A Frazier | 6 | 6
7 | (Germany) A Barna | 3 | 7 | 7
Q | (United States) M Washington | 6 | 5 | 5
(Czech Republic) K Koukalová | 2 | 6 | 3
Q | (Argentina) ME Salerni | 6 | 3 | 6

Quarterfinals
(Italy) ME Camerin | 6^{2} | 4
(United States) A Frazier | 7^{7} | 6
7 | (Germany) A Barna | 6^{4} | 3
Q | (Argentina) ME Salerni | 7^{7} | 6

Semifinals
(United States) A Frazier | 4 | 6 | 6
Q | (Argentina) ME Salerni | 6 | 3 | 2
