= 2006 Moorilla Hobart International =

- Date: 8–13 January
- Edition: 13th
- Category: WTA International
- Draw: 32S / 16D
- Prize money: $145,000
- Surface: Hard
- Location: Hobart, Australia
- Venue: Hobart International Tennis Centre

Champions

Singles
- (Netherlands) Michaëlla Krajicek

Doubles
- (France) Émilie Loit / (Australia) Nicole Pratt
- Moorilla Hobart International

The 2003 Moorilla Hobart International was a tennis tournament played on outdoor hard courts. It was the 10th edition of the event and part of the WTA International tournaments of the 2003 WTA Tour. It took place at the Hobart International Tennis Centre in Hobart, Australia from 6 through 12 January 2003. Unseeded Michaëlla Krajicek won the singles title and earned $22,900 first-prize money.

== Finals ==
=== Singles ===
- (Netherlands) Michaëlla Krajicek defeated (Czech Republic) Iveta Benešová, 6–2, 6–1

=== Doubles ===
- (France) Émilie Loit' / (Australia) Nicole Pratt defeated (United States) Jill Craybas / (Croatia) Jelena Kostanić, 6–2, 6–1

== Singles main-draw entrants ==
=== Seeds ===
Country	Player	Rank^{1}	Seed
~~SLO~~	~~Katarina Srebotnik~~	~~27~~	~~1~~
CZE	Klára Koukalová	29	2
ISR	Anna Smashnova	40	3
USA	Amy Frazier	46	4
CZE	Iveta Benešová	50	5
ARG	Mariana Díaz Oliva	52	6
ESP	Nuria Llagostera Vives	53	7
USA	Jill Craybas	57	8

- ^{1} Rankings as of 19 December 2005.

=== Other entrants ===
The following players received wildcards into the singles main draw:

- (Australia) Casey Dellacqua
- (Australia) Nicole Pratt

The following players received entry from the qualifying draw:

- (Luxembourg) Anne Kremer
- (Spain) Arantxa Parra Santonja
- (Russia) Olga Puchkova
- (Australia) Christina Wheeler

The following player received entry as a lucky loser:

- (Canada) Aleksandra Wozniak

=== Withdrawals ===
==== Before the tournament ====
- (Slovenia) Katarina Srebotnik (gastroenteritis)

== Doubles main-draw entrants ==
=== Seeds ===
Country	Player	Country	Player	Rank^{1}	Seed
FRA	Émilie Loit	AUS	Nicole Pratt	64	1
ESP	Lourdes Domínguez Lino	ESP	Nuria Llagostera Vives	122	2
~~ARG~~	~~María Emilia Salerni~~	~~VEN~~	~~Milagros Sequera~~	~~149~~	~~3~~
ITA	Mara Santangelo	USA	Mashona Washington	163	4
USA	Jill Craybas	CRO	Jelena Kostanić	173	5

- ^{1} Rankings as of 19 December 2005.

=== Other entrants ===
The following pair received wildcards into the singles main draw:

- (Australia) Lisa D'Amelio / (Australia) Emily Hewson

The following pair received entry from the qualifying draw:

- (Luxembourg) Anne Kremer / (Russia) Evgenia Linetskaya

The following pair received entry as lucky losers:

- (Argentina) Mariana Díaz Oliva / (Canada) Aleksandra Wozniak

=== Withdrawals ===
==== Before the tournament ====
- (Venezuela) Milagros Sequera (ankle sprain)
