= 2003 Canberra Women's Classic – Singles =

Singles
- 2003 Canberra Women's Classic

Final
- Champion: (United States) Meghann Shaughnessy
- Runner-up: (Italy) Francesca Schiavone
- Score: 6–1, 6–1

Details
- Draw: 32
- Seeds: 8

Events
| Singles | Doubles |
- Canberra Women's Classic

Anna Smashnova was the defending singles champion, but chose not to compete in 2003.

Second-seeded Meghann Shaughnessy won the title, defeating Francesca Schiavone in the final in straight sets.

== Draw ==
=== Seeds ===
1. (France) Nathalie Dechy (first round)
2. (United States) Meghann Shaughnessy (winner)
3. (Argentina) Clarisa Fernández (second round)
4. (Czech Republic) Dája Bedáňová (first round)
5. (Italy) Francesca Schiavone (final)
6. (Switzerland) Marie-Gaïané Mikaelian (first round)
7. (United States) Laura Granville (second round)
8. (Spain) Magüi Serna (quarterfinals)

Key

- Q = Qualifier
- WC = Wild card
- LL = Lucky loser
- Alt = Alternate
- ITF = ITF entry
- PR = Protected ranking
- SR = Special ranking
- SE = Special exempt
- JE = Junior exempt
- JR = Junior Accelerator Programme entrant
- CO = College Accelerator Programme entrant
- NG = Next Gen Accelerator Program entrant
- w/o = Walkover
- r = Retired
- d = Defaulted

=== Finals ===
Semifinals
Q | (France) Marion Bartoli | 4 | 6 | 3
5 | (Italy) Francesca Schiavone | 6 | 3 | 6
(France) Émilie Loit | 1 | 5
2 | (United States) Meghann Shaughnessy | 6 | 7

Final
5 | (Italy) Francesca Schiavone | 1 | 1
2 | (United States) Meghann Shaughnessy | 6 | 6

=== Top half ===
First round
1 | (France) N Dechy | 0 | r
LL | (Germany) M Weingärtner | 5
(Croatia) J Kostanić | 1 | 1
(France) S Foretz | 6 | 6
Q | (France) M Bartoli | 6 | 6
(United States) M Tu | 2 | 2
(Russia) D Safina | 1 | 6 | 3
7 | (United States) L Granville | 6 | 3 | 6
3 | (Argentina) C Fernández | 6 | 6
(Croatia) S Talaja | 3 | 3
Q | (Italy) F Pennetta | 6 | 6
(Slovenia) M Matevžič | 3 | 4
WC | (Australia) A Grahame | 4 | 6 | 4
(Italy) T Garbin | 6 | 1 | 6
(Colombia) F Zuluaga | 4 | 4
5 | (Italy) F Schiavone | 6 | 6

Second round
LL | (Germany) M Weingärtner | 6 | 6
(France) S Foretz | 4 | 4
Q | (France) M Bartoli | 7 | 4 | 6
7 | (United States) L Granville | 5 | 6 | 4
3 | (Argentina) C Fernández | 5 | 3
Q | (Italy) F Pennetta | 7 | 6
(Italy) T Garbin | 6^{6} | 2
5 | (Italy) F Schiavone | 7 | 6

Quarterfinals
LL | (Germany) M Weingärtner | 4 | 4
Q | (France) M Bartoli | 6 | 6
Q | (Italy) F Pennetta | 3 | 6 | 2
5 | (Italy) F Schiavone | 6 | 4 | 6

Semifinals
Q | (France) M Bartoli | 4 | 6 | 3
5 | (Italy) F Schiavone | 6 | 3 | 6

=== Bottom half ===
First round
6 | (Switzerland) M-G Mikaelian | 5 | 4
(Italy) Ad Serra Zanetti | 7 | 6
Q | (Japan) S Obata | 6 | 6
(Spain) V Ruano Pascual | 1 | 1
WC | (Australia) B Stewart | 4 | 2
(France) É Loit | 6 | 6
(Indonesia) A Widjaja | 6 | 6
4 | (Czech Republic) D Bedáňová | 3 | 3
8 | (Spain) M Serna | 6 | 7
(Russia) E Kulikovskaia | 2 | 6^{1}
(Germany) M Müller | 6 | 4 | 6^{6}
(Germany) An Barna | 3 | 6 | 7
(Uzbekistan) I Tulyaganova | 7 | 4 | 3
Q | (Spain) G Martínez Granados | 5 | 6 | 6
(France) V Razzano | 3 | 2
2 | (United States) M Shaughnessy | 6 | 6

Second round
(Italy) Ad Serra Zanetti | 6 | 6
Q | (Japan) S Obata | 4 | 1
(France) É Loit | 6 | 6
(Indonesia) A Widjaja | 4 | 4
8 | (Spain) M Serna | 7 | 7
(Germany) An Barna | 6^{5} | 5
Q | (Spain) G Martínez Granados | 2 | 3
2 | (United States) M Shaughnessy | 6 | 6

Quarterfinals
(Italy) Ad Serra Zanetti | 4 | 2
(France) É Loit | 6 | 6
8 | (Spain) M Serna | 6^{4} | 4
2 | (United States) M Shaughnessy | 7 | 6

Semifinals
(France) É Loit | 1 | 5
2 | (United States) M Shaughnessy | 6 | 7
