= Evgenia Linetskaya =

Israeli tennis player

Evgenia Linetskaya Евгения Симоновна Линецкая
- Full name: Evgenia Simonovna Linetskaya
- Country (sports): Russia (2001–2007); Israel (2007–present)
- Residence: Moscow, Russia
- Born: 30 November 1986 (age 39) Moscow, Soviet Union
- Height: 1.77 m (5 ft 9 1/2 in)
- Turned pro: 2001
- Plays: Right-handed (two-handed backhand)
- Prize money: $333,645

Singles
- Career record: 117–56
- Career titles: 7 ITF
- Highest ranking: No. 35 (4 July 2005)

Grand Slam singles results
- Australian Open: 4R (2005)
- French Open: 1R (2005)
- Wimbledon: 1R (2005)
- US Open: 2R (2004), (2005)

Doubles
- Career record: 13–19
- Career titles: 1 ITF
- Highest ranking: No. 283 (20 February 2006)

Grand Slam doubles results
- Australian Open: 1R (2006)
- French Open: 2R (2005)
- Wimbledon: 1R (2005)
- US Open: 1R (2005)

Evgenia Simonovna Linetskaya (Russian: Евгения Симоновна Линецкая, Hebrew: יבגניה לינצקיה; born 30 November 1986) is an Israeli former professional tennis player.

She won seven singles titles and one doubles title on the ITF Circuit in her career. On 4 July 2005, she reached her best singles ranking of world No. 35. On 20 February 2006, she peaked at No. 283 in the doubles rankings.

Linetskaya made it to the fourth round of the 2005 Australian Open, where she lost to Amélie Mauresmo.

== Biography ==
Linetskaya was born in Moscow, and is Jewish and plays with a Star of David necklace around her neck. She is coached by George Akopian. Her mother introduced her to tennis at age 6; she hit balls against school building for practice. Her father's Simon Linetsky is a professor of mathematics with a black belt in karate, and her mother Maria is an artist. She studied psychology for three years at Moscow University and plans to study via online education to receive an MBA. She speaks Russian, English and some Dutch.

== Tennis career ==
=== Early success ===
In February 2005, Linetskaya beat world No. 11, Vera Zvonareva, 6–4, 6–2 in Pattaya, Thailand. In March, she defeated world No. 2 Amélie Mauresmo in the third round in Indian Wells.

=== Problems ===
In late November 2005, her coach Joe Giuliano was barred for life by the WTA Tour for violating section 14, part IV, of the WTA code of conduct, which bars coaches from "non-consensual sexual contact". Her father, Simon Linetskiy, was suspended for two years. The bans resulted from events incidents at La Costa's Acura Classic in August 2005. Linetskiy was charged with suspicion of battery after his daughter had injuries treated at a hospital.

Linetskaya did not play between January 2006 and February 2007. She dropped off the rankings computer altogether.

=== Comeback ===
In February 2007, she won the Montechoro tournament in Portugal. The following month, she won both the Ramat HaSharon 2 and the Raanana tournaments in Israel, without dropping a set in either tournament. In doubles, she won at Raanana with Tzipora Obziler.

== ITF Circuit finals ==
$100,000 tournaments
$75,000 tournaments
$50,000 tournaments
$25,000 tournaments
$10,000 tournaments

=== Singles (7–5) ===
Result	No.	Date	Tournament	Surface	Opponent	Score
Loss	1.	16 July 2001	ITF Brussels, Belgium	Clay	(Germany) Camilla Kremer	1–6, 1–6
Win	2.	29 October 2002	ITF Minsk, Belarus	Carpet (i)	(Belarus) Anastasiya Yakimova	6–2, 6–1
Win	3.	24 March 2003	St. Petersburg Ladies' Trophy, Russia	Hard (i)	(Belarus) Tatsiana Uvarova	5–7, 6–4, 6–4
Loss	4.	22 September 2003	Batumi Ladies Open, Georgia	Hard	(Ukraine) Elena Tatarkova	6–1, 4–6, 3–6
Loss	5.	22 March 2004	ITF Orange, United States	Hard	(Ukraine) Yuliya Beygelzimer	3–6, 6–2, 2–6
Win	6.	12 April 2004	ITF Jackson, United States	Clay	(Russia) Alisa Kleybanova	4–6, 6–2, 6–4
Loss	7.	20 April 2004	Dothan Pro Classic, United States	Clay	(China) Peng Shuai	2–6, 1–6
Win	8.	17 August 2004	Bronx Open, United States	Hard	(Spain) Nuria Llagostera Vives	4–6, 6–3, 6–4
Loss	9.	11 February 2007	ITF Vale do Lobo, Portugal	Hard	(Romania) Liana Ungur	6–7, 2–6
Win	10.	16 February 2007	ITF Albufeira, Portugal	Hard	(Russia) Yuliya Kalabina	6–2, 6–0
Win	11.	12 March 2007	ITF Ramat Hasharon, Israel	Hard	(Slovakia) Martina Babáková	6–3, 7–6
Win	12.	19 March 2007	ITF Raanana, Israel	Hard	(Czech Republic) Tereza Hladíková	6–4, 6–4

=== Doubles (1–1) ===
Result	No.	Date	Tournament	Surface	Partner	Opponents	Score
Loss	1.	15 July 2002	ITF Frinton, United Kingdom	Grass	(Russia) Irina Bulykina	(Italy) Alberta Brianti (Australia) Michelle Summerside	3–6, 4–6
Win	2.	19 March 2007	ITF Raanana, Israel	Hard	(Israel) Tzipora Obziler	(Slovakia) Martina Babáková (Argentina) Veronica Spiegel	6–1, 6–2

== See also ==
- List of select Jewish tennis players
