= Lauren Breadmore =

Australian tennis player

- Country (sports): Australia
- Born: 1 June 1983 (age 42); Melbourne
- Retired: 2011
- Prize money: $113,909

Singles
- Career record: 155–186
- Career titles: 3 ITF
- Highest ranking: No. 221 (25 September 2006)

Grand Slam singles results
- Australian Open: 1R (2006)

Doubles
- Career record: 60–83
- Career titles: 2 ITF
- Highest ranking: No. 248 (8 August 2005)

Grand Slam doubles results
- Australian Open: 1R (2004, 2006, 2007)

Lauren Breadmore (born 1 June 1983) is a former professional tennis player from Australia.

== Biography ==
Born in Melbourne, Breadmore attended Wesley College where she graduated in 2001 with an VCE score of 99.1 and was awarded the Alexander Wawn Scholar Dux Award.

From 2002, she competed on the international tennis circuit. In 2003, she won both the singles and doubles titles at an ITF tournament in Wellington. In 2004, she made the first of her three main-draw appearances in women's doubles at the Australian Open. At the beginning of the 2005 season, she made her WTA Tour singles main-draw debut at the Canberra Women's Classic, which remained her only appearance at that level. She featured in a total of 36 professional tournaments in 2005, as well as at the Summer Universiade in Turkey. Her titles in 2005 included a $25,000 tournament in Lyneham, Canberra. She received a wildcard into the main draw of the 2006 Australian Open and was beaten in the first round by 14th seed Svetlana Kuznetsova. She made only the occasional appearance from 2008, before retiring in 2011.

During her tennis career, she studied for a commerce degree at the University of Melbourne. Graduating in 2010, she now works as a management consultant. In 2014, she became a board member of the Australian Davis Cup Tennis Foundation.

== ITF Circuit finals ==
Legend
$50,000 tournaments
$25,000 tournaments
$10,000 tournaments

=== Singles: 6 (3–3) ===
Result	No.	Date	Tournament	Surface	Opponent	Score
Win	1.	2 February 2003	ITF Wellington, New Zealand	Hard	(Australia) Dubravka Cupac	6–3, 2–6, 7–5
Loss	1.	9 March 2003	ITF Warrnambool, Australia	Grass	(Australia) Monique Adamczak	2–6, 6–4, 3–6
Loss	2.	8 February 2004	ITF Wellington, New Zealand	Hard	(Australia) Cindy Watson	4–6, 1–6
Win	2.	24 April 2005	ITF Yamaguchi, Japan	Clay	(Japan) Erika Takao	6–3, 6–2
Win	3.	16 October 2005	ITF Lyneham, Australia	Clay	(Australia) Beti Sekulovski	7–5, 6–4
Loss	3.	30 October 2005	ITF Tokyo, Japan	Hard	(South Korea) Kim Hea-mi	3–6, 3–6

=== Doubles: 9 (2–7) ===
Result	No.	Date	Tournament	Surface	Partner	Opponents	Score
Loss	1.	19 May 2002	ITF Tel Aviv, Israel	Hard	(United Kingdom) Natalie Neri	(Israel) Tzipora Obziler (Israel) Hila Rosen	6–4, 3–6, 2–6
Loss	2.	28 May 2002	ITF Warsaw, Poland	Clay	(Russia) Maria Boboedova	(Sweden) Jenny Lindström (Sweden) Maria Wolfbrandt	3–6, 2–6
Loss	3.	28 July 2002	ITF Gardone Val Trompia, Italy	Clay	(Czech Republic) Eva Erbová	(Italy) Giulia Meruzzi (Serbia and Montenegro) Dina Milošević	5–7, 5–7
Win	1.	1 February 2003	ITF Wellington, New Zealand	Hard	(Australia) Kristen van Elden	(Chinese Taipei) Chuang Chia-jung (New Zealand) Ilke Gers	6–4, 6–1
Loss	4.	14 March 2004	ITF Benalla, Australia	Grass	(United States) Kaysie Smashey	(New Zealand) Paula Marama (New Zealand) Eden Marama	5–7, 1–6
Loss	5.	30 January 2005	ITF Waikoloa Village, United States	Hard	(Japan) Ayami Takase	(South Africa) Natalie Grandin (United States) Kaysie Smashey	3–6, 4–6
Win	2.	26 March 2005	ITF Athens, Greece	Clay	(France) Aurélie Védy	(Romania) Mădălina Gojnea (Romania) Lenore Lăzăroiu	6–3, 7–5
Loss	6.	17 July 2005	ITF Hamilton, Canada	Clay	(United States) Lauren Barnikow	(Japan) Kumiko Iijima (Japan) Junri Namigata	7–6^{(4)}, 2–6, 2–6
Loss	7.	25 October 2005	ITF Tokyo, Japan	Hard	(Germany) Annette Kolb	(Japan) Maki Arai (South Korea) Kim Hea-mi	4–6, 6–7^{(5)}
