= Nannie de Villiers =

South African tennis player (born 1976)

- Country (sports): South Africa
- Residence: Somerset West, South Africa
- Born: 5 January 1976 (age 49); Windhoek, South West Africa
- Height: 1.78 m (5 ft 10 in)
- Turned pro: 1993
- Retired: 2007
- Plays: Right-handed (two-handed backhand)
- Prize money: US$294,308

Singles
- Career record: 154–135
- Career titles: 0 WTA, 4 ITF
- Highest ranking: No. 172 (15 December 1997)

Grand Slam singles results
- Australian Open: Q1 (1998)
- Wimbledon: Q1 (1995)
- US Open: Q1 (1999)

Doubles
- Career record: 259–173
- Career titles: 1 WTA, 22 ITF
- Highest ranking: No. 53 (16 September 2002)

Grand Slam doubles results
- Australian Open: 2R (1998–99, 2003)
- French Open: 3R (2001)
- Wimbledon: 3R (2002)
- US Open: 2R (1999)

Nannie de Villiers (born Esmé de Villiers, 5 January 1976) is a former professional tennis player who represented South Africa. She was born in neighbouring Namibia but moved at a young age.

De Villiers made her début in 1993, at the small ITF Johannesburg tournament. She also played her next event in her native country, in Pretoria, winning the doubles event. Although she officially retired in 2003, she made a minor-comeback in 2007, entering the Cape Town event, losing in the first round singles and reaching the semifinals doubles. She never surpassed the singles qualifying stages at a Grand Slam tournament.

Despite never winning a WTA Tour singles title, she won four on the ITF Circuit, and 22 doubles titles there.

De Villiers retired from professional tennis in 2007.

== WTA career finals ==
=== Doubles: 3 (1 title, 2 runner-ups) ===
Legend
Grand Slam tournaments (0–0)
Tier I (0–0)
Tier II (0–0)
Tier III (0–1)
Tier IV & V (1–1)

Result	Date	Tournament	Surface	Partner	Opponents	Score
Loss	Jan 2001	Canberra International, Australia	Hard	(Australia) Annabel Ellwood	(United States) Nicole Arendt (Japan) Ai Sugiyama	4–6, 6–7^{(2–7)}
Win	Jan 2002	Canberra International, Australia	Hard	(Kazakhstan) Irina Selyutina	(United States) Samantha Reeves (Italy) Adriana Serra Zanetti	6–2, 6–3
Loss	Sep 2002	Waikoloa Championships, US	Hard	(Kazakhstan) Irina Selyutina	(United States) Meilen Tu (Venezuela) María Vento-Kabchi	6–1, 2–6, 3–6

== ITF finals ==
=== Singles: 8 (4–4) ===
$75,000 tournaments
$50,000 tournaments
$25,000 tournaments
$10,000 tournaments

Result	No.	Date	Tournament	Surface	Opponent	Score
Win	1.	9 May 1994	ITF Bracknell, United Kingdom	Hard	(United Kingdom) Claire Taylor	6–2, 6–2
Loss	2.	1 August 1994	ITF Munich, Germany	Clay	(Germany) Angela Kerek	6–7^{(5)}, 3–6
Win	3.	22 August 1994	ITF Horb, Germany	Clay	(Germany) Catrin Müller	7–6^{(1)}, 6–4
Loss	4.	13 April 1997	ITF Warwick, Australia	Grass	(Australia) Jenny-Ann Fetch	2–6, 6–4, 6–7
Win	5.	21 April 1997	ITF Dalby, Australia	Hard	(Australia) Evie Dominikovic	7–5, 7–6
Loss	6.	28 April 1997	ITF Kooralbyn, Australia	Hard	(Australia) Evie Dominikovic	2–6, 4–6
Loss	7.	31 May 1997	Bundaberg, Australia	Hard	(Australia) Lisa McShea	4–6, 2–6
Win	8.	13 July 1997	ITF Easton, United States	Hard	(United States) Karin Miller	6–3, 6–3

=== Doubles : 41 (22–19) ===
Result	No.	Date	Tournament	Surface	Partner	Opponents	Score
Win	1.	27 September 1993	ITF Johannesburg, South Africa	Hard	(South Africa) Lucinda Gibbs	(South Africa) Janine Humphreys (South Africa) Cindy Summers	6–1, 6–2
Win	2.	27 March 1994	Nairobi, Kenya	Hard	(Zimbabwe) Cara Black	(United Kingdom) Sybille Seyfried (Spain) Magüi Serna	6–2, 6–2
Loss	3.	8 August 1994	Paderborn, Germany	Clay	(Colombia) Carmiña Giraldo	(Slovakia) Nora Kovařčíková (Slovakia) Simona Nedorostová	2–6, 4–6
Loss	4.	15 August 1994	Bergisch, Germany	Clay	(Colombia) Carmiña Giraldo	(Germany) Sabine Gerke (Austria) Elisabeth Habeler	3–6, 2–6
Loss	5.	31 October 1994	Montevideo, Uruguay	Clay	(Brazil) Ana Paula Zannoni	(Hungary) Virág Csurgó (Hungary) Petra Mandula	4–6, 5–7
Loss	6.	7 November 1994	Buenos Aires, Argentina	Clay	(Argentina) Laura Montalvo	(Hungary) Virág Csurgó (Hungary) Petra Mandula	3–6, 3–6
Loss	7.	4 December 1995	São Paulo, Brazil	Hard	(Hungary) Katalin Marosi	(Brazil) Vanessa Menga (Brazil) Luciana Tella	3–6, 2–6
Win	8.	31 March 1996	Albury, Australia	Grass	(Australia) Danielle Jones	(Japan) Tomoe Hotta (Australia) Angie Marik	7–6, 6–3
Win	9.	24 March 1997	Warrnambool, Australia	Grass	(United Kingdom) Shirli-Ann Siddall	(Australia) Joanne Limmer (Australia) Lisa McShea	6–4, 4–6, 7–6
Win	10.	30 March 1997	Warrnambool, Australia	Grass	(United Kingdom) Shirli-Ann Siddall	(United Kingdom) Joanne Ward (United Kingdom) Lorna Woodroffe	3–6, 6–2, 6–3
Loss	11.	4 April 1997	Corowa, Australia	Grass	(United Kingdom) Shirli-Ann Siddall	(Australia) Trudi Musgrave (Australia) Jane Taylor	4–6, 7–6, 4–6
Win	12.	26 April 1997	Dalby, Australia	Hard	(Australia) Lisa McShea	(Australia) Jenny-Ann Fetch (Australia) Renee Reid	6–0, 6–3
Win	13.	3 May 1997	Kooralbyn, Australia	Hard	(Australia) Lisa McShea	(Australia) Jenny-Ann Fetch (Australia) Renee Reid	6–7^{(4)}, 6–1, 6–3
Win	14.	10 May 1997	Hope Island, Australia	Hard	(Australia) Lisa McShea	(Australia) Jenny-Ann Fetch (Australia) Renee Reid	6–4, 6–4
Loss	15.	17 May 1997	Caboolture, Australia	Clay	(Australia) Lisa McShea	(Japan) Shinobu Asagoe (Thailand) Benjamas Sangaram	4–6, 5–7
Loss	16.	24 May 1997	Gympie, Australia	Clay	(Australia) Lisa McShea	(Japan) Shinobu Asagoe (Thailand) Benjamas Sangaram	7–5, 3–6, 3–6
Win	17.	31 May 1997	Bundaberg, Australia	Clay	(Australia) Lisa McShea	(Japan) Shinobu Asagoe (Thailand) Benjamas Sangaram	4–6, 6–1, 6–1
Win	18.	7 June 1997	Ipswich, Australia	Clay	(Australia) Lisa McShea	(Japan) Shinobu Asagoe (Thailand) Benjamas Sangaram	6–4, 3–6, 7–5
Win	19.	13 July 1997	Easton, United States	Hard	(Australia) Lisa McShea	(United States) Marissa Catlin (United States) Karin Miller	6–0, 3–6, 6–2
Win	20.	5 October 1997	Santa Clara, United States	Hard	(Australia) Lisa McShea	(Australia) Rachel McQuillan (Japan) Nana Smith	7–6^{(3)}, 7–6^{(5)}
Loss	21.	19 October 1997	Indian Wells, United States	Hard	(Australia) Lisa McShea	(Australia) Kristine Kunce (Australia) Rachel McQuillan	5–7, 4–6
Win	22.	23 November 1997	Port Pirie, Australia	Hard	(Australia) Lisa McShea	(Poland) Aleksandra Olsza (South Africa) Jessica Steck	6–4, 6–3
Loss	23.	30 November 1997	Nuriootpa, Australia	Hard	(Australia) Lisa McShea	(Australia) Catherine Barclay (Australia) Kerry-Anne Guse	6–3, 7–5
Loss	24.	22 February 1998	Rochester, United States	Hard (i)	(United States) Ginger Helgeson-Nielsen	(Australia) Catherine Barclay (Australia) Kerry-Anne Guse	4–6, 4–6
Win	25.	17 May 1998	Haines City, United States	Clay	(South Africa) Jessica Steck	(Canada) Maureen Drake (Canada) Renata Kolbovic	6–3, 6–2
Loss	26.	4 October 1998	Caracas, Venezuela	Hard	(Slovakia) Janette Husárová	(Argentina) María Fernanda Landa (Netherlands) Seda Noorlander	4–6, 7–5, 6–7
Loss	27.	1 November 1998	Austin, United States	Hard	(South Africa) Liezel Horn	(Canada) Maureen Drake (United States) Lindsay Lee-Waters	1–6, 1–6
Loss	28.	4 April 1999	Claremont, United States	Hard	(Japan) Rika Hiraki	(Australia) Rachel McQuillan (Japan) Nana Smith	2–6, 3–6
Win	29.	16 May 1999	Midlothian, United States	Clay	(South Africa) Jessica Steck	(United States) Erika deLone (Australia) Annabel Ellwood	6–4, 6–0
Loss	30.	3 October 1999	Santa Clara, United States	Hard	(Australia) Nicole Pratt	(United States) Debbie Graham (Japan) Nana Smith	4–6, 4–6
Win	31.	20 February 2000	Midland, United States	Hard (i)	(Japan) Rika Hiraki	(South Africa) Surina De Beer (Israel) Tzipora Obziler	6–1, 1–6, 6–1
Loss	32.	1 May 2000	Gifu, Japan	Carpet	(South Africa) Surina De Beer	(Japan) Shinobu Asagoe (Japan) Yuka Yoshida	3–6, 1–6
Loss	33.	1 October 2000	Saga, Japan	Carpet	(Czech Republic) Eva Krejčová	(United States) Amanda Augustus (Australia) Amy Jensen	4–6, 3–6
Win	34.	20 October 2000	Brisbane, Australia	Hard	(Australia) Annabel Ellwood	(Australia) Kerry-Anne Guse (Australia) Rachel McQuillan	3–5, 4–2, 5–3, 4–1
Win	35.	26 November 2000	Nuriootpa, Australia	Hard	(Australia) Annabel Ellwood	(Australia) Rachel McQuillan (Australia) Lisa McShea	7–6^{(1)}, 6–3
Win	36.	3 December 2000	Mount Gambier, Australia	Hard	(Australia) Annabel Ellwood	(Australia) Evie Dominikovic (Australia) Amanda Grahame	6–2, 6–2
Win	37.	10 December 2000	Port Pirie, Australia	Hard	(Australia) Annabel Ellwood	(Australia) Evie Dominikovic (Australia) Amanda Grahame	3–6, 6–2, 6–4
Win	38.	21 October 2001	Southampton, United Kingdom	Hard (İ)	(Kazakhstan) Irina Selyutina	(Bulgaria) Lubomira Bacheva (Ukraine) Elena Tatarkova	7–6^{(5)}, 2–6, 6–2
Loss	39.	28 October 2001	Dallas, United States	Hard	(Kazakhstan) Irina Selyutina	(Japan) Rika Hiraki (Japan) Nana Miyagi	6–7^{(4)}, 2–6
Win	40.	4 November 2001	Hayward, United States	Hard	(Kazakhstan) Irina Selyutina	(United States) Amanda Augustus (United States) Abigail Spears	6–0, 7–5
Loss	41.	9 June 2002	ITF Surbiton, United Kingdom	Grass	(Kazakhstan) Irina Selyutina	(United Kingdom) Julie Pullin (United Kingdom) Lorna Woodroffe	2–6, 2–6
