= Canberra International =

Tennis tournament held in Australia

Defunct tennis tournament
- Tour: WTA Tour
- Sponsor: Richard Luton Properties
- Founded: 2001
- Abolished: 2006
- Editions: 6
- Location: Canberra, Australia
- Venue: National Sports Club
- Category: Tier III (2001); Tier V (2002–2005); Tier IV (2006)
- Surface: Hard / outdoor (Rebound Ace)
- Draw: 32S / 16D / 32QS / 4QD
- Prize money: $145,000

The Canberra International (sponsored by Richard Luton Properties) was a women's tennis tournament held in Canberra, Australia. The event was affiliated with the Women's Tennis Association (WTA), and was classed variously as a Tier III (2001), a Tier V (2002–2005), and a Tier IV (2006) on the WTA Tour. It was competed on outdoor hardcourts. The event was intended to be one of the build-up tournaments to the first Grand Slam event of the year, the Australian Open.

The tournament was held at the National Sports Club in the Northern Canberra suburb of Lyneham and was played on Rebound Ace hardcourts. A singles and doubles competition was held each year. The singles prize winner received US$16,000 and 95 tournament points. Justine Henin and Ana Ivanovic, both of whom went on to win Grand Slam titles and become world No. 1, were amongst the singles champions.

== Past finals ==
=== Singles ===
Year	Champion	Runner-up	Score
Canberra International
2001	(Belgium) Justine Henin	(France) Sandrine Testud	6–2, 6–2
Canberra Women's Classic
2002	(Israel) Anna Smashnova	(Thailand) Tamarine Tanasugarn	7–5, 7–6^{(7–2)}
2003	(United States) Meghann Shaughnessy	(Italy) Francesca Schiavone	6–1, 6–1
2004	(Argentina) Paola Suárez	(Italy) Silvia Farina Elia	3–6, 6–4, 7–6^{(7–5)}
Richard Luton Properties Canberra Women's Classic
2005	(Serbia and Montenegro) Ana Ivanovic	(Hungary) Melinda Czink	7–5, 6–1
Richard Luton Properties Canberra International
2006	(Spain) Anabel Medina Garrigues	(South Korea) Cho Yoon-jeong	6–4, 0–6, 6–4

=== Doubles ===
Year	Champions	Runners-up	Score
Canberra International
2001	(United States) Nicole Arendt (Japan) Ai Sugiyama	(South Africa) Nannie de Villiers (Australia) Annabel Ellwood	6–4, 7–6^{(7–2)}
Canberra Women's Classic
2002	(South Africa) Nannie de Villiers (Kazakhstan) Irina Selyutina	(United States) Samantha Reeves (Italy) Adriana Serra Zanetti	6–2, 6–3
2003	(Italy) Tathiana Garbin (France) Émilie Loit	(Czech Republic) Dája Bedáňová (Russia) Dinara Safina	6–3, 3–6, 6–4
2004	(Croatia) Jelena Kostanić (Luxembourg) Claudine Schaul	(France) Caroline Dhenin (Australia) Lisa McShea	6–4, 7–6^{(7–3)}
Richard Luton Properties Canberra Women's Classic
2005	(Italy) Tathiana Garbin (Slovenia) Tina Križan	(Czech Republic) Gabriela Navrátilová (Czech Republic) Michaela Paštiková	7–5, 1–6, 6–4
Richard Luton Properties Canberra International
2006	(Poland) Marta Domachowska (Italy) Roberta Vinci	(United Kingdom) Claire Curran (Latvia) Līga Dekmeijere	7–6^{(7–5)}, 6–3

== See also ==
- List of tennis tournaments
