= Shinobu Asagoe =

Japanese tennis player (born 1976)

Shinobu Asagoe 浅越しのぶ
- Country (sports): Japan
- Residence: Hyōgo
- Born: 28 June 1976 (age 50) Hyōgo
- Height: 1.70 m (5 ft 7 in)
- Turned pro: 1997
- Retired: 2006
- Plays: Right-handed
- Prize money: $1,662,261

Singles
- Career record: 275–208
- Career titles: 9 ITF
- Highest ranking: No. 21 (18 April 2005)

Grand Slam singles results
- Australian Open: 2R (2005, 2006)
- French Open: 4R (2004)
- Wimbledon: 4R (2003)
- US Open: QF (2004)

Doubles
- Career record: 226–148
- Career titles: 8 WTA, 10 ITF
- Highest ranking: No. 13 (8 May 2006)

Grand Slam doubles results
- Australian Open: SF (2006)
- French Open: QF (2002, 2005)
- Wimbledon: 3R (2003, 2005)
- US Open: 3R (2005, 2006)

Team competitions
- Fed Cup: 17–10
Medal record
Representing Japan
Asian Games
Silver medal – second place	2002 Busan	Team
Bronze medal – third place	2002 Busan	Singles
Summer Universiade
Gold medal – first place	1995 Fukuoka	Doubles
Bronze medal – third place	1997 Catania	Doubles

Shinobu Asagoe (浅越しのぶ, Asagoe Shinobu; born 28 June 1976) is a Japanese former tennis player. She turned professional in 1997, and retired in 2006.

== Career ==
2000 was the first year in which she finished in the WTA top 100 (No. 72). At the US Open that year, she defeated Patty Schnyder, a top-50 player. She also reached her first WTA Tour quarterfinal that year at the Princess Cup at Tokyo, defeating Ai Sugiyama and losing to Monica Seles. She also represented Japan at the Sydney Olympics. In 2003, she reached her first WTA singles final. In 2004, she reached her second career singles final in Hobart, as well as her first Grand Slam quarterfinal at the US Open. In April 2005, Asagoe reached her career-high singles ranking of world No. 21. In May of the following year, she reached her career-high doubles ranking (13th).

Asagoe appeared in one WTA Tour final, in Auckland 2003, where she lost to Katarina Srebotnik in three sets. She held a 4–0 lead in the second set when Srebotnik took an injury timeout. From there, Strebotnik played "all in" tennis and won the match, in what was an agonising result for Asagoe.

Her most memorable match was a second-round marathon at Wimbledon 2003, when her stressed-out opponent, Daniela Hantuchová, melted down well on the way to what looked like a routine two-set win. Eventually, after nearly three hours, Asagoe won the contest 12–10 in the third set.

She played doubles with Katarina Srebotnik. At the 2006 Australian Open, they reached the semifinals by beating Cara Black/Rennae Stubbs 6–3, 4–6, 6–0. They lost to eventual champions Yan/Zheng in the semifinals.

At the US Open that same year, she lost her first-round match in straight sets to Jelena Kostanić. She had announced, the US Open would be her last tournament. In doubles, with Akiko Morigami, they won their first-round match 6–1, 6–3, and they were to play against the 14th seeds, Marion Bartoli/Shahar Peer. Bartoli/Peer were up 6–4, 5–2, before Shinobu and Akiko won four straight games to make it 6–5. They held many set points at 6–5, but could not convert, thus forcing a tiebreaker; they were down 2–6, but won six straight points, thus taking the tiebreaker, saving four straight match points. They took the final set 6–4.

Asagoe retired at the 2006 US Open, after losing her third-round doubles match (with Morigami) to the world's top-ranked team Lisa Raymond/Samantha Stosur.

== Grand Slam performance timelines ==
Key
W	F	SF	QF	#R	RR	Q#	DNQ	A	NH

(W) winner; (F) finalist; (SF) semifinalist; (QF) quarterfinalist; (#R) rounds 4, 3, 2, 1; (RR) round-robin stage; (Q#) qualification round; (DNQ) did not qualify; (A) absent; (NH) not held; (SR) strike rate (events won / competed); (W–L) win–loss record.

=== Singles ===
Tournament	2002	2003	2004	2005	2006	SR	W–L	Win %
Australian Open	1R	1R	1R	2R	2R	0 / 5	2–5	29%
French Open	2R	1R	4R	2R	1R	0 / 5	5–5	50%
Wimbledon	3R	4R	1R	1R	2R	0 / 5	6–5	55%
US Open	1R	3R	QF	3R	1R	0 / 5	8–5	62%
Win–loss	3–4	5–4	7–4	4–4	2–4	0 / 20	21–20	51%

=== Doubles ===
Tournament	2002	2003	2004	2005	2006	SR	W–L	Win %
Australian Open	QF	2R	2R	3R	SF	0 / 5	11–5	69%
French Open	QF	2R	3R	QF	1R	0 / 5	9–5	64%
Wimbledon	2R	3R	2R	3R	1R	0 / 5	6–5	55%
US Open	2R	2R	1R	3R	3R	0 / 5	6–5	55%
Win–loss	8–4	5–4	4–4	9–4	6–4	0 / 20	32–20	62%

== Olympic Games medal match ==
=== Doubles ===
Outcome	Year	Location	Surface	Partner	Opponents	Score
4th place	2004	Athens, Greece	Hard	(Japan) Ai Sugiyama	(Argentina) Paola Suárez (Argentina) Patricia Tarabini	3–6, 3–6

== WTA Tour finals ==
=== Singles: 3 (runner-ups) ===
Legend
Tier III (0–1)
Tier IV & V (0–2)

Result	No.	Date	Tournament	Surface	Opponent	Score
Loss	1.	Jun 2003	Birmingham Classic, UK	Grass	(Bulgaria) Magdalena Maleeva	1–6, 4–6
Loss	2.	Jan 2004	Hobart International, Australia	Hard	(United States) Amy Frazier	3–6, 3–6
Loss	3.	Jan 2005	Auckland Open, New Zealand	Hard	(Slovenia) Katarina Srebotnik	7–5, 5–7, 4–6

=== Doubles: 12 (8 titles, 4 runner-ups) ===
Legend
Tier I (1–1)
Tier II (1–0)
Tier III (4–2)
Tier IV & V (2–1)

Result	No.	Date	Tournament	Surface	Partner	Opponents	Score
Win	1.	Jun 2002	Birmingham, UK	Grass	(Belgium) Els Callens	(United States) Kimberly Po (France) Nathalie Tauziat	6–4, 6–3
Win	2.	Oct 2002	Tokyo, Japan	Hard	(Japan) Nana Miyagi	(Russia) Svetlana Kuznetsova (Spain) Arantxa Sánchez Vicario	6–4, 4–6, 6–4
Loss	1.	Mar 2003	Miami Open, United States	Hard	(Japan) Nana Miyagi	(South Africa) Liezel Huber (Bulgaria) Magdalena Maleeva	4–6, 6–3, 5–7
Loss	2.	Apr 2003	Sarasota, United States	Clay	(Japan) Nana Miyagi	(South Africa) Liezel Huber (United States) Martina Navratilova	6–7^{(8–10)}, 3–6
Win	3.	Jan 2004	Hobart, Australia	Hard	(Japan) Seiko Okamoto	(Belgium) Els Callens (Austria) Barbara Schett	2–6, 6–4, 6–3
Win	4.	Aug 2004	Montreal, Canada	Hard	(Japan) Ai Sugiyama	(South Africa) Liezel Huber (Thailand) Tamarine Tanasugarn	6–0, 6–3
Win	5.	Oct 2004	Tokyo, Japan	Hard	(Slovenia) Katarina Srebotnik	(United States) Jennifer Hopkins (United States) Mashona Washington	6–1, 6–4
Win	6.	Jan 2005	Auckland, New Zealand	Hard	(Slovenia) Katarina Srebotnik	(New Zealand) Leanne Baker (Italy) Francesca Lubiani	6–3, 6–3
Loss	3.	Oct 2005	Tokyo, Japan	Hard	(Venezuela) María Vento-Kabchi	(Argentina) Gisela Dulko (Russia) Maria Kirilenko	5–7, 6–4, 3–6
Win	7.	Oct 2005	Bangkok, Thailand	Hard	(Argentina) Gisela Dulko	(Spain) Conchita Martínez (Spain) Virginia Ruano Pascual	6–1, 7–5
Loss	4.	Mar 2006	Acapulco, Mexico	Clay	(France) Émilie Loit	(Germany) Anna-Lena Grönefeld (United States) Meghann Shaughnessy	1–6, 3–6
Win	8.	Apr 2006	Amelia Island, United States	Clay	(Slovenia) Katarina Srebotnik	(South Africa) Liezel Huber (India) Sania Mirza	6–2, 6–4

== ITF Circuit finals ==
Legend
$100,000 tournaments
$75,000 tournaments
$50,000 tournaments
$25,000 tournaments
$10,000 tournaments

=== Singles (9–6) ===
Result	No.	Date	Tournament	Surface	Opponent	Score
Win	1.	27 May 1996	ITF Taipei, Taiwan	Hard	(Japan) Tomoe Hotta	6–3, 6–0
Win	2.	13 October 1996	ITF Kugayama, Japan	Hard	(Japan) Akiko Morigami	6–1, 3–6, 6–1
Win	3.	21 October 1996	ITF Kyoto, Japan	Hard	(Japan) Keiko Nagatomi	6–2, 6–4
Win	4.	18 May 1997	ITF Caboolture, Australia	Hard	(Australia) Renee Reid	6–4, 6–1
Loss	5.	25 May 1997	ITF Gympie, Australia	Hard	(Australia) Renee Reid	6–3, 3–6, 4–6
Loss	6.	8 June 1997	ITF Ipswich, Australia	Hard	(Australia) Renee Reid	1–6, 3–6
Loss	7.	12 October 1997	ITF Saga, Japan	Grass	(South Africa) Surina De Beer	1–6, 7–5, 3–6
Win	8.	22 May 1998	ITF Noda, Japan	Hard	(Japan) Haruka Inoue	6–2, 6–4
Win	9.	15 March 1999	ITF Noda, Japan	Hard	(Switzerland) Miroslava Vavrinec	7–5, 6–4
Win	10.	4 April 1999	ITF Clermont, United States	Hard	(Japan) Nana Smith	5–7, 6–4, 6–1
Loss	11.	1 May 2000	Kangaroo Cup, Japan	Carpet	(Thailand) Tamarine Tanasugarn	5–7, 5–6
Loss	12.	7 April 2002	Dubai Tennis Challenge, UAE	Hard	(Indonesia) Angelique Widjaja	6–7^{(4)}, 2–6
Loss	13.	5 May 2002	Kangaroo Cup, Japan	Carpet	(United Kingdom) Julie Pullin	6–4, 4–6, 3–6
Win	14.	20 October 2002	ITF Haibara, Japan	Carpet	(Japan) Aiko Nakamura	6–4, 7–5
Win	15.	5 May 2003	Kangaroo Cup, Japan	Grass	(Japan) Saori Obata	6–4, 6–1

=== Doubles (10–9) ===
Result	No.	Date	Tournament	Surface	Partner	Opponents	Score
Loss	1.	3 October 1994	ITF Ibaraki, Japan	Hard	(Japan) Haruka Inoue	(South Korea) Kim Il-soon (Japan) Yoriko Yamagishi	2–6, 1–6
Win	2.	16 October 1995	ITF Kugayama, Japan	Hard	(Japan) Yuko Hosoki	(Australia) Natalie Frawley (Australia) Jenny Anne Fetch	6–4, 7–6^{(3)}
Win	3.	3 June 1996	ITF Taichung, Taiwan	Hard	(Japan) Yuka Tanaka	(Japan) Tomoe Hotta (Japan) Sachie Umehara	6–0, 6–1
Loss	4.	4 May 1997	Kangaroo Cup, Japan	Carpet	(Japan) Yasuko Nishimata	(Japan) Saori Obata (Japan) Kaoru Shibata	3–6, 5–7
Win	5.	17 May 1997	Caboolture, Australia	Clay	(Thailand) Benjamas Sangaram	(South Africa) Nannie de Villiers (Australia) Lisa McShea	6–4, 7–5
Win	6.	24 May 1997	Gympie, Australia	Clay	(Thailand) Benjamas Sangaram	(South Africa) Nannie de Villiers (Australia) Lisa McShea	5–7, 6–3, 6–3
Loss	7.	31 May 1997	Bundaberg, Australia	Clay	(Thailand) Benjamas Sangaram	(South Africa) Nannie de Villiers (Australia) Lisa McShea	6–4, 1–6, 1–6
Loss	8.	7 June 1997	Ipswich, Australia	Clay	(Thailand) Benjamas Sangaram	(South Africa) Nannie de Villiers (Australia) Lisa McShea	4–6, 6–3, 5–7
Win	9.	18 October 1998	Seoul, South Korea	Hard	(Germany) Kirstin Freye	(Australia) Catherine Barclay (South Korea) Choi Young-ja	6–2, 7–6
Loss	10.	21 March 1999	Noda, Japan	Hard	(Japan) Yuka Yoshida	(South Korea) Cho Yoon-jeong (South Korea) Park Sung-hee	3–6, 3–6
Loss	11.	24 October 1999	Nashville, United States	Hard	(Japan) Yuka Yoshida	(United States) Nicole Arendt (United States) Katie Schlukebir	1–6, 6–7
Win	12.	7 May 2000	Kangaroo Cup, Japan	Carpet	(Japan) Yuka Yoshida	(South Africa) Nannie de Villiers (South Africa) Surina De Beer	6–3, 6–1
Win	13.	14 May 2000	Seoul, South Korea	Clay	(Japan) Saori Obata	(China) Li Na (China) Li Ting	6–1, 6–3
Win	14.	26 November 2002	Minneapolis, United States	Hard (i)	(Belgium) Els Callens	(Japan) Rika Hiraki (Japan) Nana Smith	7–6^{(3)}, 7–6^{(3)}
Loss	15.	1 May 2002	Kangaroo Cup, Japan	Carpet	(Japan) Rika Fujiwara	(South Korea) Cho Yoon-jeong (Australia) Evie Dominikovic	2–6, 2–6
Win	16.	12 May 2002	Fukuoka International, Japan	Hard	(South Korea) Cho Yoon-jeong	(United Kingdom) Julie Pullin (United Kingdom) Lorna Woodroffe	6–2, 6–4
Loss	17.	18 August 2002	Bronx Open, United States	Hard	(Japan) Nana Smith	(Estonia) Maret Ani (Italy) Flavia Pennetta	4–6, 1–6
Loss	18.	27 April 2003	Kangaroo Cup, Japan	Grass	(Japan) Nana Smith	(Japan) Rika Fujiwara (Japan) Saori Obata	6–1, 5–7, 3–6
Win	19.	8 June 2003	Surbiton Trophy, UK	Grass	(Japan) Nana Smith	(United States) Bethanie Mattek-Sands (United States) Lilia Osterloh	7–6, 3–6, 6–4
