= 2015 Diamond Games – Singles =

Singles
- 2015 Diamond Games

Final
- Champion: (Germany) Andrea Petkovic
- Runner-up: (Spain) Carla Suárez Navarro
- Score: Walkover

Events
Singles	Doubles
- Diamond Games

This is the first edition of the tournament since 2008, when Justine Henin won the title. Henin retired from professional tennis for the final time on 26 January 2011.

Andrea Petkovic won the title via walkover when Carla Suárez Navarro withdrew from the final with a neck injury. Petkovic saved eight match points against Alison Van Uytvanck in her second round match.

In lieu of playing the final, Petkovic participated in an exhibition match against former world No. 1 and tournament director Kim Clijsters. Clijsters won the match 5–3.

== Seeds ==
The top four seeds received a bye into the second round.

1. (Canada) Eugenie Bouchard (second round)
2. (Germany) Angelique Kerber (second round)
3. (Germany) Andrea Petkovic (champion)
4. (Czech Republic) Lucie Šafářová (quarterfinals)
5. (Spain) Carla Suárez Navarro (final, withdrew)
6. (Slovakia) Dominika Cibulková (quarterfinals)
7. (France) Alizé Cornet (second round)
8. (Czech Republic) Karolína Plíšková (semifinals)

== Draw ==
Key

- Q = Qualifier
- WC = Wild card
- LL = Lucky loser
- Alt = Alternate
- ITF = ITF entry
- PR = Protected ranking
- SR = Special ranking
- SE = Special exempt
- JE = Junior exempt
- JR = Junior Accelerator Programme entrant
- CO = College Accelerator Programme entrant
- NG = Next Gen Accelerator Program entrant
- w/o = Walkover
- r = Retired
- d = Defaulted

=== Finals ===
Semifinals
(Czech Republic) Barbora Záhlavová-Strýcová	6^{2}	6^{6}
3	(Germany) Andrea Petkovic	7^{7}	7^{8}
8	(Czech Republic) Karolína Plíšková	2	2
5	(Spain) Carla Suárez Navarro	6	6

Final
3	(Germany) Andrea Petkovic	w/o
5	(Spain) Carla Suárez Navarro

=== Top half ===
First round
Q	(Belgium) K Liebens	2	0
(Germany) M Barthel	6	6
WC	(Belgium) Y Wickmayer	2	2
(Czech Republic) B Záhlavová-Strýcová	6	6
(Switzerland) B Bencic	6	2	5
7	(France) A Cornet	1	6	7
WC	(Belgium) A Van Uytvanck	6	6
(Slovakia) M Rybáriková	2	3
(Bulgaria) T Pironkova	7	3	3
Q	(Netherlands) I de Vroome	5	6	6
Q	(Ukraine) K Bondarenko	1	2
6	(Slovakia) D Cibulková	6	6

Second round
1	(Canada) E Bouchard	6	1	2
(Germany) M Barthel	4	6	6
(Czech Republic) B Záhlavová-Strýcová	6	6
7	(France) A Cornet	4	2
3	(Germany) A Petkovic	6^{7}	7^{7}	6
WC	(Belgium) A Van Uytvanck	7^{9}	6^{5}	2
Q	(Netherlands) I de Vroome	3	6	2
6	(Slovakia) D Cibulková	6	3	6

Quarterfinals
(Germany) M Barthel	2	2
(Czech Republic) B Záhlavová-Strýcová	6	6
3	(Germany) A Petkovic	7^{7}	6
6	(Slovakia) D Cibulková	6^{2}	0

Semifinals
(Czech Republic) B Záhlavová-Strýcová	6^{2}	6^{6}
3	(Germany) A Petkovic	7^{7}	7^{8}

=== Bottom half ===
First round
8	(Czech Republic) Ka Plíšková	6	7^{7}
(Croatia) M Lučić-Baroni	4	6^{5}
(Germany) A Beck	6	6
(Italy) K Knapp	3	1
(France) K Mladenovic	6	1
(Spain) S Soler Espinosa	2	0^{r}
5	(Spain) C Suárez Navarro	1	6	6
(Italy) C Giorgi	6	2	4
(Belgium) K Flipkens	3	2
(Romania) M Niculescu	6	6
(Czech Republic) K Koukalová	3	1
Q	(Italy) F Schiavone	6	6

Second round
8	(Czech Republic) Ka Plíšková	6	6
(Germany) A Beck	3	3
(France) K Mladenovic	4	1
4	(Czech Republic) L Šafářová	6	6
5	(Spain) C Suárez Navarro	4	6	6
(Romania) M Niculescu	6	0	2
Q	(Italy) F Schiavone	6	6
2	(Germany) A Kerber	1	1

Quarterfinals
8	(Czech Republic) Ka Plíšková	7^{7}	6
4	(Czech Republic) L Šafářová	6^{5}	3
5	(Spain) C Suárez Navarro	6	6
Q	(Italy) F Schiavone	3	2

Semifinals
8	(Czech Republic) Ka Plíšková	2	2
5	(Spain) C Suárez Navarro	6	6

== Qualifying ==
=== Seeds ===
1. (Czech Republic) Kateřina Siniaková (qualifying competition)
2. (Italy) Francesca Schiavone (qualified)
3. (Germany) Carina Witthöft (second round)
4. (Hungary) Tímea Babos (first round)
5. (Germany) Anna-Lena Friedsam (qualifying competition)
6. (Belgium) An-Sophie Mestach (first round)
7. (Spain) Lourdes Domínguez Lino (first round)
8. (Ukraine) Maryna Zanevska (first round)

=== Qualifiers ===
1. (Netherlands) Indy de Vroome
2. (Italy) Francesca Schiavone
3. (Belgium) Klaartje Liebens
4. (Ukraine) Kateryna Bondarenko

=== Draw ===
==== First qualifier ====
First round
1	(Czech Republic) Kateřina Siniaková	7^{7}	6
(Bulgaria) Elitsa Kostova	6^{4}	3
(Czech Republic) Renata Voráčová	6	3	6^{3}
(Romania) Patricia Maria Țig	2	6	7^{7}
(Poland) Paula Kania	1	6	3
WC	(Netherlands) Indy de Vroome	6	3	6
(Serbia) Vesna Dolonc	6	3	6
7	(Spain) Lourdes Domínguez Lino	1	6	4

Second round
1	(Czech Republic) Kateřina Siniaková	6	6
(Romania) Patricia Maria Țig	2	3
WC	(Netherlands) Indy de Vroome	7	6
(Serbia) Vesna Dolonc	5	3

Qualifying competition
1	(Czech Republic) Kateřina Siniaková	0	6	6^{2}
WC	(Netherlands) Indy de Vroome	6	4	7^{7}

==== Second qualifier ====
First round
2	(Italy) Francesca Schiavone	6	6
(Ukraine) Lyudmyla Kichenok	2	1
(France) Océane Dodin	2	6	6
(Italy) Alberta Brianti	6	2	3
(Russia) Marina Melnikova	6	7
(Russia) Ekaterina Bychkova	1	5
WC	(Netherlands) Eva Wacanno	1	5
5	(Germany) Anna-Lena Friedsam	6	7

Second round
2	(Italy) Francesca Schiavone	6	6
(France) Océane Dodin	4	2
(Russia) Marina Melnikova	1	6^{7}
5	(Germany) Anna-Lena Friedsam	6	7^{9}

Qualifying competition
2	(Italy) Francesca Schiavone	7	6
5	(Germany) Anna-Lena Friedsam	5	2

==== Third qualifier ====
First round
3	(Germany) Carina Witthöft	6	6
Alt	(Belgium) Lara Salden	2	3
(Belgium) Ysaline Bonaventure	6	6
(Germany) Laura Siegemund	3	2
(Czech Republic) Barbora Krejčíková	4	3
WC	(Belgium) Klaartje Liebens	6	6
(Italy) Gioia Barbieri	7^{7}	6
8	(Ukraine) Maryna Zanevska	6^{0}	2

Second round
3	(Germany) Carina Witthöft	3	1
(Belgium) Ysaline Bonaventure	6	6
WC	(Belgium) Klaartje Liebens	7	7
(Italy) Gioia Barbieri	5	5

Qualifying competition
(Belgium) Ysaline Bonaventure	6	1	6^{3}
WC	(Belgium) Klaartje Liebens	2	6	7^{7}

==== Fourth qualifier ====
First round
4	(Hungary) Tímea Babos	3	6	3
PR	(Ukraine) Kateryna Bondarenko	6	3	6
WC	(Spain) Paula Badosa Gibert	6	6
(Ukraine) Anastasiya Vasylyeva	4	3
(Ukraine) Nadiia Kichenok	6	6
(Belgium) Elise Mertens	3	3
(Germany) Dinah Pfizenmaier	6	7
6	(Belgium) An-Sophie Mestach	3	5

Second round
PR	(Ukraine) Kateryna Bondarenko	6	6
WC	(Spain) Paula Badosa Gibert	4	0
(Ukraine) Nadiia Kichenok	4	2^{r}
(Germany) Dinah Pfizenmaier	6	2

Qualifying competition
PR	(Ukraine) Kateryna Bondarenko	6	6
(Germany) Dinah Pfizenmaier	1	1
