= 2006 Proximus Diamond Games – Singles =

Singles
- 2006 Proximus Diamond Games

Final
- Champion: (France) Amélie Mauresmo
- Runner-up: (Belgium) Kim Clijsters
- Score: 3–6, 6–3, 6–3

Events
Singles	Doubles
- Diamond Games

Amélie Mauresmo was the defending champion, and successfully retained her title, defeating Kim Clijsters in the final 3–6, 6–3, 6–3.

== Seeds ==
The top four seeds receive a bye into the second round.

1. (Belgium) Kim Clijsters (final)
2. (France) Amélie Mauresmo (champion)
3. (France) ~~Mary Pierce~~ (withdrew due to a right foot tendinitis)
4. (Russia) Nadia Petrova (semifinals)
5. (Russia) Elena Dementieva (semifinals)
6. (Switzerland) Patty Schnyder (quarterfinals)
7. (United States) ~~Venus Williams~~ (withdrew due to a sprained ligament right arm)
8. (Italy) Francesca Schiavone (second round)
9. (Slovakia) Daniela Hantuchová (second round)

== Draw ==
Key

- Q = Qualifier
- WC = Wild card
- LL = Lucky loser
- Alt = Alternate
- ITF = ITF entry
- PR = Protected ranking
- SR = Special ranking
- SE = Special exempt
- JE = Junior exempt
- JR = Junior Accelerator Programme entrant
- CO = College Accelerator Programme entrant
- NG = Next Gen Accelerator Program entrant
- w/o = Walkover
- r = Retired
- d = Defaulted

=== Finals ===
Semifinals
1	(Belgium) Kim Clijsters	5	6	6
5	(Russia) Elena Dementieva	7	1	2
4	(Russia) Nadia Petrova	4	5
2	(France) Amélie Mauresmo	6	7

Final
1	(Belgium) Kim Clijsters	6	3	3
2	(France) Amélie Mauresmo	3	6	6

=== Top half ===
First round
(France) T Golovin	6	7^{7}
WC	(Belgium) K Flipkens	1	6^{3}
(France) V Razzano	4	6	3
(Russia) D Safina	6	4	6
(Slovenia) K Srebotnik	4	2
8	(Italy) F Schiavone	6	6
(Czech Republic) K Koukalová	6	6
(Czech Republic) L Šafářová	2	4
(Spain) A Medina Garrigues	4	3
(Poland) M Domachowska	6	6
Q	(Estonia) M Ani	3	2
5	(Russia) E Dementieva	6	6

Second round
1	(Belgium) K Clijsters	4	7^{7}	7
(France) T Golovin	6	6^{4}	5
(Russia) D Safina	6	6
8	(Italy) F Schiavone	2	4
LL	(Greece) E Daniilidou	6	6
(Czech Republic) K Koukalová	4	1
(Poland) M Domachowska	3	6^{5}
5	(Russia) E Dementieva	6	7^{7}

Quarterfinals
1	(Belgium) K Clijsters	7^{7}	6
(Russia) D Safina	6^{1}	4
LL	(Greece) E Daniilidou	4	5
5	(Russia) E Dementieva	6	7

Semifinals
1	(Belgium) K Clijsters	5	6	6
5	(Russia) E Dementieva	7	1	2

=== Bottom half ===
First round
9	(Slovakia) D Hantuchová	6	6
LL	(Czech Republic) Z Ondrášková	1	0
Q	(France) S Cohen-Aloro	6	5	5
Q	(Ukraine) O Savchuk	2	7	7
(Serbia and Montenegro) A Ivanovic	6	6
(Italy) R Vinci	3	3
6	(Switzerland) P Schnyder	6	6
WC	(Netherlands) M Krajicek	0	4
(Czech Republic) K Peschke	6	6
Q	(Croatia) K Šprem	1	2
(Czech Republic) I Benešová	6	6
(Venezuela) M Vento-Kabchi	3	2

Second round
9	(Slovakia) D Hantuchová	4	3
Q	(Ukraine) O Savchuk	6	6
(Serbia and Montenegro) A Ivanovic	5	3
4	(Russia) N Petrova	7	6
6	(Switzerland) P Schnyder	w/o
(Czech Republic) K Peschke
(Czech Republic) I Benešová	3	3
2	(France) A Mauresmo	6	6

Quarterfinals
Q	(Ukraine) O Savchuk	3	3
4	(Russia) N Petrova	6	6
6	(Switzerland) P Schnyder	2	4
2	(France) A Mauresmo	6	6

Semifinals
4	(Russia) N Petrova	4	5
2	(France) A Mauresmo	6	7
