= 2007 Proximus Diamond Games – Singles =

Singles
- 2007 Proximus Diamond Games

Final
- Champion: (France) Amélie Mauresmo
- Runner-up: (Belgium) Kim Clijsters
- Score: 6–4, 7–6^{(7–4)}

Details
- Draw: 28 (4WC/2Q/1LL)
- Seeds: 8

Events
Singles	Doubles
- Diamond Games

In the 2007 Proximus Diamond Games (women's) Singles Amélie Mauresmo was the two-time defending champion, and successfully defended her title, defeating Kim Clijsters in the final 6–4, 7–6^{(7–4)} in a rematch of the previous year's final. By winning a third title, Mauresmo received a golden racket decorated with diamonds that is estimated to be worth $1.3 million.

== Seeds ==
1. (France) Amélie Mauresmo (champion)
2. (Belgium) Kim Clijsters (final)
3. (Russia) Nadia Petrova (quarterfinals)
4. (Russia) Elena Dementieva (second round, retired due to rib fracture)
5. (Switzerland) Patty Schnyder (second round)
6. (Russia) Dinara Safina (quarterfinals)
7. (Russia) Anna Chakvetadze (semifinals)
8. (Serbia) Ana Ivanovic (quarterfinals)

== Draw ==
Key

- Q = Qualifier
- WC = Wild card
- LL = Lucky loser
- Alt = Alternate
- ITF = ITF entry
- PR = Protected ranking
- SR = Special ranking
- SE = Special exempt
- JE = Junior exempt
- JR = Junior Accelerator Programme entrant
- CO = College Accelerator Programme entrant
- NG = Next Gen Accelerator Program entrant
- w/o = Walkover
- r = Retired
- d = Defaulted

=== Finals ===
Semifinals
1	(France) Amélie Mauresmo	6	3	6
7	(Russia) Anna Chakvetadze	3	6	2
(France) Tatiana Golovin	4	3
2	(Belgium) Kim Clijsters	6	6

Final
1	(France) Amélie Mauresmo	6	7^{7}
2	(Belgium) Kim Clijsters	4	6^{4}

=== Top half ===
First round
(Germany) A-L Grönefeld	4	1
Q	(France) V Razzano	6	6
(Germany) M Müller	3	2
(Netherlands) M Krajicek	6	6
(Russia) E Vesnina	4	1
6	(Russia) D Safina	6	6
Q	(United States) L Osterloh	1	0
(Russia) V Zvonareva	6	6
WC	(Belgium) C Maes	2	0
(Austria) S Bammer	6	6
(Greece) E Daniilidou	4	2
7	(Russia) A Chakvetadze	6	6

Second round
1	(France) A Mauresmo	7^{8}	7
Q	(France) V Razzano	6^{6}	5
(Netherlands) M Krajicek	2	6^{4}
6	(Russia) D Safina	6	7^{7}
3	(Russia) N Petrova	7	6
(Russia) V Zvonareva	6	4
(Austria) S Bammer	6	6^{4}	2
7	(Russia) A Chakvetadze	4	7^{7}	6

Quarterfinals
1	(France) A Mauresmo	6	6
6	(Russia) D Safina	1	3
3	(Russia) N Petrova	3	4
7	(Russia) A Chakvetadze	6	6

Semifinals
1	(France) A Mauresmo	6	3	6
7	(Russia) A Chakvetadze	3	6	2

=== Bottom half ===
First round
5	(Switzerland) P Schnyder	6	6
WC	(Belgium) K Flipkens	4	1
(France) T Golovin	6	6
(Slovenia) K Srebotnik	0	2
(Russia) E Likhovtseva	6	6
Q	(Russia) V Dushevina	4	1
8	(Serbia) A Ivanovic	6	6
LL	(Belarus) A Yakimova	3	2
Q	(Germany) J Schruff	1	1
(France) N Dechy	6	6
(Russia) O Poutchkova	7^{7}
(France) S Brémond	6^{2}	r

Second round
5	(Switzerland) P Schnyder	7^{7}	6^{5}	2
(France) T Golovin	6^{2}	7^{7}	6
(Russia) E Likhovtseva	6	1
4	(Russia) E Dementieva	2	1	r
8	(Serbia) A Ivanovic	6	6^{2}	6
(France) N Dechy	3	7^{7}	2
(Russia) O Poutchkova	0	2
2	(Belgium) K Clijsters	6	6

Quarterfinals
(France) T Golovin	7^{7}	7
(Russia) E Likhovtseva	6^{3}	5
8	(Serbia) A Ivanovic	2	1
2	(Belgium) K Clijsters	6	6

Semifinals
(France) T Golovin	4	3
2	(Belgium) K Clijsters	6	6

== Notes ==
- The winner will receive $88,265 and 275 ranking points.
- The runner-up will receive $47,125 and 190 ranking points.
- The last direct acceptance was Sybille Bammer.
- The players' representative was Yanina Wickmayer.
