= 2007 Proximus Diamond Games – Doubles =

Doubles
- 2007 Proximus Diamond Games

Final
- Champion: (Zimbabwe) Cara Black (South Africa) Liezel Huber
- Runner-up: (Russia) Elena Likhovtseva (Russia) Elena Vesnina
- Score: 7–5, 4–6, 6–1

Events
Singles	Doubles
← 2006 ·	Proximus Diamond Games	· 2008 →

Dinara Safina and Katarina Srebotnik were the reigning champions, but neither chose to participate that year.

Cara Black and Liezel Huber won the title, defeating Elena Likhovtseva and Elena Vesnina in the final 7–5, 4–6, 6–1.

== Seeds ==
1. (Zimbabwe) Cara Black
  (South Africa) Liezel Huber (champions)
2. (France) Nathalie Dechy
  (Russia) Vera Zvonareva (semifinals)
3. (Slovakia) Janette Husárová
  (Czech Republic) Květa Peschke (semifinals)
4. (Russia) Elena Likhovtseva
  (Russia) Elena Vesnina (final)

== Draw ==
=== Key ===
- Q = Qualifier
- WC = Wild card
- LL = Lucky loser
- Alt = Alternate
- ITF = ITF entry
- PR = Protected ranking
- SR = Special ranking
- SE = Special exempt
- JE = Junior exempt
- JR = Junior Accelerator Programme entrant
- CO = College Accelerator Programme entrant
- NG = Next Gen Accelerator Program entrant
- w/o = Walkover
- r = Retired
- d = Defaulted

=== Draw ===
First round
1	(Zimbabwe) C Black (South Africa) L Huber	6	6
(Romania) A Ehritt-Vanc (Germany) M Müller	1	0
(Belgium) C Maes (Belgium) Y Wickmayer	6^{3}	6	6
(Russia) M Kondratieva (France) S Lefèvre	7^{7}	4	4
3	(Slovakia) J Husárová (Czech Republic) K Peschke	6	6
(Belgium) L Butkiewicz (Belgium) D Feys	0	2
(Czech Republic) E Birnerová (Finland) E Laine	w/o
(France) S Brémond (Belgium) K Flipkens
(Czech Republic) I Benešová (Netherlands) M Krajicek	3	6	7
(Czech Republic) G Navrátilová (Czech Republic) V Uhlířová	6	2	5
(Germany) V Henke (Germany) J Schruff	3	3
4	(Russia) E Likhovtseva (Russia) E Vesnina	6	6
(Greece) E Daniilidou (Germany) J Wöhr	6	6
(Georgia (country)) M Chaknashvili (Russia) E Ivanova	2	1
(Russia) E Bychkova (Tunisia) S Sfar	1	2
2	(France) N Dechy (Russia) V Zvonareva	6	6

Quarterfinals
1	(Zimbabwe) C Black (South Africa) L Huber	6	6
(Belgium) C Maes (Belgium) Y Wickmayer	2	2
3	(Slovakia) J Husárová (Czech Republic) K Peschke	6	6
(Czech Republic) E Birnerová (Finland) E Laine	4	1
(Czech Republic) I Benešová (Netherlands) M Krajicek	2	1
4	(Russia) E Likhovtseva (Russia) E Vesnina	6	6
(Greece) E Daniilidou (Germany) J Wöhr	3	4
2	(France) N Dechy (Russia) V Zvonareva	6	6

Semifinals
1	(Zimbabwe) C Black (South Africa) L Huber	6	6
3	(Slovakia) J Husárová (Czech Republic) K Peschke	3	4
4	(Russia) E Likhovtseva (Russia) E Vesnina	6	7
2	(France) N Dechy (Russia) V Zvonareva	4	5

Final
1	(Zimbabwe) C Black (South Africa) L Huber	7	4	6
4	(Russia) E Likhovtseva (Russia) E Vesnina	5	6	1

== Notes ==
- The winners received $27,730 and 275 ranking points.
- The runners-up received $14,900 and 190 ranking points.
- The last directly accepted team was Leslie Butkiewicz/Debbrich Feys (combined ranking of 700).
- The player representative was Martina Müller.
