= 2008 Proximus Diamond Games =

- Date: 11–17 February
- Edition: 7th
- Category: Tier II
- Draw: 28S / 16D
- Prize money: $600,000
- Surface: Hard (i)
- Location: Antwerp, Belgium
- Venue: Sportpaleis

Champions

Singles
- (Belgium) Justine Henin

Doubles
- (Zimbabwe) Cara Black / (United States) Liezel Huber
← 2007 ·	Diamond Games	· 2015 →

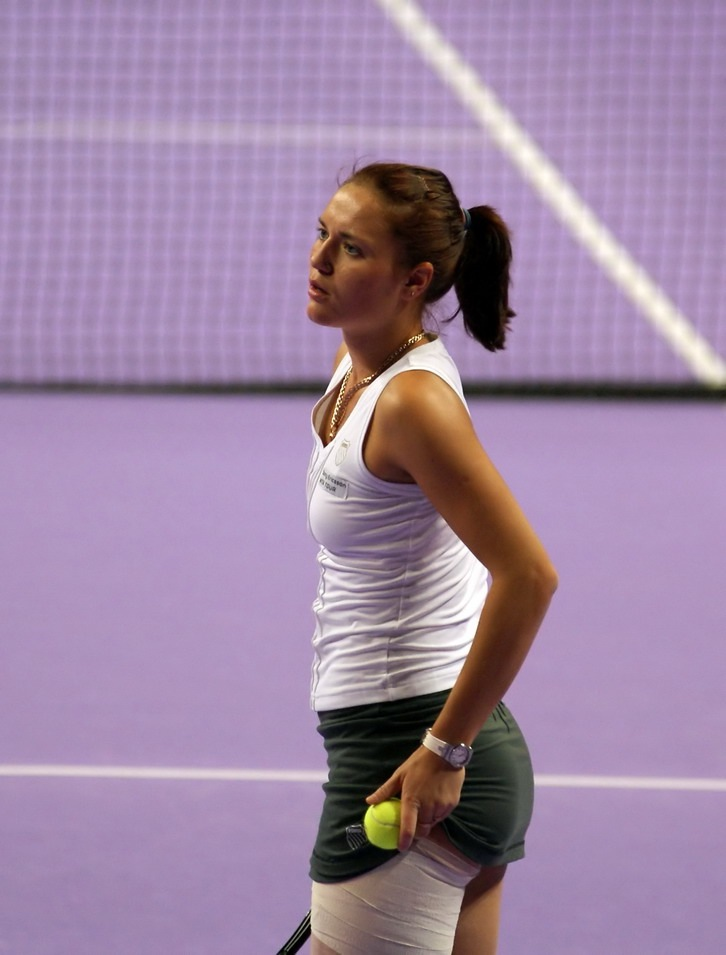
Kateryna Bondarenko before a serve.

The 2008 Proximus Diamond Games was the 2008 Tier II tournament in the WTA Tour of the annually-held Proximus Diamond Games tennis tournament. It was played from 11 February through 17 February 2008 at the Sportpaleis in Antwerp, Belgium. First-seeded Justine Henin won the singles title and earned $95,500 first-prize money.

== Gambling threat ==
On February 11, the first day of the event, tournament spokeswoman Katia Stroobants announced that three men had been ejected from the stadium after being caught gambling. The men, two Russians and one German, were logged on to a gambling website and were exploiting the delay between when the point was won, and when it appeared on the official website. Stroobants said that the men were asked to leave or hand over their laptops, and decided to leave.

This incident followed a spate of gambling scandals to hit the sport, with several male players admitting that they had been approached to fix matches; irregular betting patterns had also been observed in certain matches, in the months leading up to the event. In January 2007, WTA Tour chief Larry Scott had announced that the organization was anticipating problems and was trying to put in place measures to deal with them.

== Finals ==
=== Singles ===
(Belgium) Justine Henin defeated (Italy) Karin Knapp, 6–3, 6–3

- It was Henin's 2nd title of the year, and the 41st of her career.

=== Doubles ===
(Zimbabwe) Cara Black / (United States) Liezel Huber defeated (Czech Republic) Květa Peschke / (Japan) Ai Sugiyama 6–1, 6–3
