= 2006 Proximus Diamond Games =

- Date: 13–19 February
- Edition: 5th
- Category: WTA Tier II
- Draw: 28S / 16D
- Prize money: $600,000
- Surface: Hard / indoor
- Location: Antwerp, Belgium
- Venue: Sportpaleis

Champions

Singles
- (France) Amélie Mauresmo

Doubles
- (Russia) Dinara Safina / (Slovenia) Katarina Srebotnik
← 2005 ·	Diamond Games	· 2007 →

The 2006 Proximus Diamond Games was a women's professional tennis tournament played on indoor hard courts at the Sportpaleis in Antwerp, Belgium that was part of the Tier II category of the 2006 WTA Tour. It was the fifth edition of the tournament and was held from 13 February until 19 February 2002. Second-seeded Amélie Mauresmo won her second consecutive singles title at the event and earned $93,000 first-prize money.

== Finals ==
=== Singles ===
(France) Amélie Mauresmo defeated (Belgium) Kim Clijsters, 3–6, 6–3, 6–3

=== Doubles ===
(Russia) Dinara Safina / (Slovenia) Katarina Srebotnik defeated (France) Stéphanie Foretz / (Netherlands) Michaëlla Krajicek, 6–1, 6–1
