= 2015 Diamond Games – Doubles =

Doubles
- 2015 Diamond Games

Final
- Champions: (Spain) Anabel Medina Garrigues (Spain) Arantxa Parra Santonja
- Runners-up: (Belgium) An-Sophie Mestach (Belgium) Alison Van Uytvanck
- Score: 6–4, 3–6, [10–5]

Events
Singles	Doubles
← 2008 ·	Diamond Games

This was the first edition of the tournament since 2008, when Cara Black and Liezel Huber won the title. Black and Huber chose not to participate this year.

Anabel Medina Garrigues and Arantxa Parra Santonja won the title, defeating An-Sophie Mestach and Alison Van Uytvanck in the final, 6–4, 3–6, [10–5].

== Seeds ==
1. (Spain) Anabel Medina Garrigues / (Spain) Arantxa Parra Santonja (champions)
2. (Netherlands) Michaëlla Krajicek / (Romania) Monica Niculescu (quarterfinals, withdrew)
3. (Poland) Klaudia Jans-Ignacik / (Slovenia) Andreja Klepač (quarterfinals)
4. (Canada) Gabriela Dabrowski / (Poland) Alicja Rosolska (first round)

== Draw ==
=== Key ===
- Q = Qualifier
- WC = Wild card
- LL = Lucky loser
- Alt = Alternate
- SE = Special exempt
- PR = Protected ranking
- ITF = ITF entry
- JE = Junior exempt
- w/o = Walkover
- r = Retired
- d = Defaulted
- SR = Special ranking

=== Draw ===
First round
1	(Spain) A Medina Garrigues (Spain) A Parra Santonja	7	6
(Romania) E Bogdan (United States) N Melichar	5	0
(Austria) S Klemenschits (Ukraine) A Vasylyeva	3	4
(Czech Republic) K Koukalová (Slovakia) M Rybáriková	6	6
4	(Canada) G Dabrowski (Poland) A Rosolska	4	4
(Croatia) D Jurak (Germany) L Siegemund	6	6
(Czech Republic) E Hrdinová (France) L Thorpe	3	4
(Ukraine) L Kichenok (Ukraine) N Kichenok	6	6
(Ukraine) K Bondarenko (Ukraine) O Savchuk	3	6^{3}
(Czech Republic) B Krejčíková (Czech Republic) R Voráčová	6	7^{7}
WC	(Slovakia) D Cibulková (Belgium) K Flipkens	6	2	[5]
3	(Poland) K Jans-Ignacik (Slovenia) A Klepač	3	6	[10]
(Germany) M Barthel (Romania) R Olaru	2	5
WC	(Belgium) A-S Mestach (Belgium) A Van Uytvanck	6	7
(Georgia (country)) O Kalashnikova (Poland) P Kania	4	0
2	(Netherlands) M Krajicek (Romania) M Niculescu	6	6

Quarterfinals
1	(Spain) A Medina Garrigues (Spain) A Parra Santonja	6	6
(Czech Republic) K Koukalová (Slovakia) M Rybáriková	3	2
(Croatia) D Jurak (Germany) L Siegemund	7^{7}	6
(Ukraine) L Kichenok (Ukraine) N Kichenok	6^{4}	3
(Czech Republic) B Krejčíková (Czech Republic) R Voráčová	6	6^{4}	[10]
3	(Poland) K Jans-Ignacik (Slovenia) A Klepač	0	7^{7}	[8]
WC	(Belgium) A-S Mestach (Belgium) A Van Uytvanck	w/o
2	(Netherlands) M Krajicek (Romania) M Niculescu

Semifinals
1	(Spain) A Medina Garrigues (Spain) A Parra Santonja	3	7^{8}	[15]
(Croatia) D Jurak (Germany) L Siegemund	6	6^{6}	[13]
(Czech Republic) B Krejčíková (Czech Republic) R Voráčová	5	7^{7}	[11]
WC	(Belgium) A-S Mestach (Belgium) A Van Uytvanck	7	6^{5}	[13]

Final
1	(Spain) A Medina Garrigues (Spain) A Parra Santonja	6	3	[10]
WC	(Belgium) A-S Mestach (Belgium) A Van Uytvanck	4	6	[5]
