= 2015 Diamond Games =

- Date: 9–15 February
- Edition: 8th
- Category: WTA Premier
- Draw: 28S / 16D
- Prize money: $731,000
- Surface: Hard
- Location: Antwerp, Belgium
- Venue: Sportpaleis Merksem

Champions

Singles
- (Germany) Andrea Petkovic

Doubles
- (Spain) Anabel Medina Garrigues / (Spain) Arantxa Parra Santonja
← 2008 ·	Diamond Games

The 2015 Diamond Games (known as 2015 BNP Paribas Fortis Diamond Games for sponsorship reason) was a tennis tournament played on indoor hard courts. It was the 8th edition of the Diamond Games, and part of the WTA Premier tournaments of the 2015 WTA Tour. It took place at the Sportpaleis Merksem in Antwerp, Belgium, from 9 to 15 February 2015.

== Point distribution ==
Event	W	F	SF	QF	Round of 16	Round of 32	Q	Q3	Q2	Q1
Singles	470	305	185	100	55	1	25	18	13	1
Doubles	470	305	185	100	1	—	—	—	—	—

== Prize money ==
Event	W	F	SF	QF	Round of 16	Round of 32^{1}	Q3	Q2	Q1
Singles	$124,000	$66,000	$35,455	$19,050	$10,220	$5,580	$2,920	$1,555	$860
Doubles*	$39,000	$20,650	$11,360	$5,875	$3,140	—	—	—	—

_{^{1}Qualifiers prize money is also the Round of 32 prize money.}
_{*per team}

== Singles main-draw entrants ==
=== Seeds ===
Country	Player	Rank^{1}	Seed
CAN	Eugenie Bouchard	7	1
GER	Angelique Kerber	10	2
GER	Andrea Petkovic	12	3
CZE	Lucie Šafářová	15	4
ESP	Carla Suárez Navarro	17	5
SVK	Dominika Cibulková	18	6
FRA	Alizé Cornet	19	7
CZE	Karolína Plíšková	22	8

- ^{1} Rankings as of February 2, 2015.

=== Other entrants ===
The following players received wildcards into the singles main draw:

- (Belgium) Alison Van Uytvanck
- (Belgium) Yanina Wickmayer

The following players received entry from the qualifying draw:

- (Ukraine) Kateryna Bondarenko
- (Netherlands) Indy de Vroome
- (Belgium) Klaartje Liebens
- (Italy) Francesca Schiavone

=== Withdrawals ===
During the tournament

- (Spain) Carla Suárez Navarro (neck injury)

=== Retirements ===
- (Spain) Sílvia Soler Espinosa (right shoulder injury)

== Doubles main-draw entrants ==
=== Seeds ===
Country	Player	Country	Player	Rank^{1}	Seed
ESP	Anabel Medina Garrigues	ESP	Arantxa Parra Santonja	63	1
NED	Michaëlla Krajicek	ROU	Monica Niculescu	69	2
POL	Klaudia Jans-Ignacik	SLO	Andreja Klepač	85	3
CAN	Gabriela Dabrowski	POL	Alicja Rosolska	113	4

- ^{1} Rankings as of February 2, 2015.

=== Other entrants ===
The following pairs received wildcards into the doubles main draw:

- (Slovakia) Dominika Cibulková / (Belgium) Kirsten Flipkens
- (Belgium) An-Sophie Mestach / (Belgium) Alison Van Uytvanck

=== Withdrawals ===
During the tournament

- (Romania) Monica Niculescu (right thigh injury)

== Finals ==
=== Singles ===
- (Germany) Andrea Petkovic defeated (Spain) Carla Suárez Navarro, walkover

=== Doubles ===
- (Spain) Anabel Medina Garrigues / (Spain) Arantxa Parra Santonja defeated (Belgium) An-Sophie Mestach / (Belgium) Alison Van Uytvanck, 6–4, 3–6, [10–5]
