= 2008 Proximus Diamond Games – Doubles =

Doubles
- 2008 Proximus Diamond Games

Final
- Champion: (Zimbabwe) Cara Black (South Africa) Liezel Huber
- Runner-up: (Czech Republic) Květa Peschke (Japan) Ai Sugiyama
- Score: 6–1, 6–3

Events
Singles	Doubles
← 2007 ·	Diamond Games	· 2015 →

Cara Black and Liezel Huber were the defending champions, and successfully defended their title, defeating Květa Peschke and Ai Sugiyama in the final, 6–1, 6–3.

== Seeds ==
1. (Zimbabwe) Cara Black / (United States) Liezel Huber (champions)
2. (Czech Republic) Květa Peschke / (Japan) Ai Sugiyama (final)
3. (Ukraine) Alyona Bondarenko / (Ukraine) Kateryna Bondarenko (semifinals)
4. (Russia) Elena Likhovtseva / (Ukraine) Tatiana Perebiynis (first round)

== Draw ==
=== Key ===
- Q = Qualifier
- WC = Wild card
- LL = Lucky loser
- Alt = Alternate
- ITF = ITF entry
- PR = Protected ranking
- SR = Special ranking
- SE = Special exempt
- JE = Junior exempt
- JR = Junior Accelerator Programme entrant
- CO = College Accelerator Programme entrant
- NG = Next Gen Accelerator Program entrant
- w/o = Walkover
- r = Retired
- d = Defaulted

=== Draw ===
First round
1	(Zimbabwe) C Black (United States) L Huber	6	6
(Russia) A JIdkova (Germany) J Wöhr	2	2
WC	(Belgium) K Flipkens (Belgium) C Maes	6^{5}	0
(France) S Foretz (Tunisia) S Sfar	7	6
4	(Russia) E Likhovtseva (Ukraine) T Perebiynis	6^{3}	5
(Russia) Y Shvedova (Czech Republic) V Uhlířová	7	7
(Russia) A Kleybanova (Romania) M Niculescu	4	4
(Belarus) E Dzehalevich (Belarus) O Govortsova	6	6
(South Africa) K Anderson (Switzerland) P Schnyder	2	6	[11]
(Switzerland) T Bacsinszky (Belgium) D Feys	6	4	[9]
(Bosnia and Herzegovina) M Jugić-Salkić (Czech Republic) G Navrátilová	6^{3}	5
3	(Ukraine) A Bondarenko (Ukraine) K Bondarenko	7	7
(Czech Republic) L Hradecká (Czech Republic) R Voráčová	1	6	[10]
(France) N Dechy (Belgium) Y Wickmayer	6	4	[7]
(United States) J Ditty (Ukraine) Y Fedak	6^{2}	2
2	(Czech Republic) K Peschke (Japan) A Sugiyama	7	6

Quarterfinals
1	(Zimbabwe) C Black (United States) L Huber	6	6
(France) S Foretz (Tunisia) S Sfar	2	1
(Russia) Y Shvedova (Czech Republic) V Uhlířová	5	6	5
(Belarus) E Dzehalevich (Belarus) O Govortsova	7	1	[10]
(South Africa) K Anderson (Switzerland) P Schnyder	4	3
3	(Ukraine) A Bondarenko (Ukraine) K Bondarenko	6	6
(Czech Republic) L Hradecká (Czech Republic) R Voráčová	3	6	[7]
2	(Czech Republic) K Peschke (Japan) A Sugiyama	6	3	[10]

Semifinals
1	(Zimbabwe) C Black (United States) L Huber	6	3	[10]
(Belarus) E Dzehalevich (Belarus) O Govortsova	2	6	[5]
3	(Ukraine) A Bondarenko (Ukraine) K Bondarenko	1	1
2	(Czech Republic) K Peschke (Japan) A Sugiyama	6	6

Final
1	(Zimbabwe) C Black (United States) L Huber	6	6
2	(Czech Republic) K Peschke (Japan) A Sugiyama	1	3
