= 2008 Proximus Diamond Games – Singles =

Singles
- 2008 Proximus Diamond Games

Final
- Champion: (Belgium) Justine Henin
- Runner-up: (Italy) Karin Knapp
- Score: 6–3, 6–3

Details
- Draw: 28 (2WC/4Q/2LL)
- Seeds: 8

Events
Singles	Doubles
- Diamond Games

Amélie Mauresmo was the three-time defending champion, but chose not to participate this year.

Justine Henin won the title, defeating Karin Knapp in the final 6–3, 6–3.

== Seeds ==
1. (Belgium) Justine Henin (champion)
2. (Russia) Anna Chakvetadze (second round)
3. (Slovakia) Daniela Hantuchová (quarterfinals)
4. (Switzerland) Patty Schnyder (quarterfinals)
5. (Austria) Sybille Bammer (first round)
6. (Hungary) Ágnes Szávay (first round)
7. (Poland) Agnieszka Radwańska (withdrew due to personal reasons)
8. (Ukraine) Alona Bondarenko (first round)
9. (China) Li Na (semifinals)

== Draw ==
Key

- Q = Qualifier
- WC = Wild card
- LL = Lucky loser
- Alt = Alternate
- ITF = ITF entry
- PR = Protected ranking
- SR = Special ranking
- SE = Special exempt
- JE = Junior exempt
- JR = Junior Accelerator Programme entrant
- CO = College Accelerator Programme entrant
- NG = Next Gen Accelerator Program entrant
- w/o = Walkover
- r = Retired
- d = Defaulted

=== Finals ===
Semifinals
1	(Belgium) Justine Henin	2	6	6
Q	(Switzerland) Timea Bacsinszky	6	3	3
(Italy) Karin Knapp	6	7^{7}
9	(China) Li Na	4	6^{5}

Final
1	(Belgium) Justine Henin	6	6
(Italy) Karin Knapp	3	3

=== Top half ===
First round
(Luxembourg) A Kremer	1	1
Q	(Bulgaria) T Pironkova	6	6
Q	(Ukraine) T Perebiynis	6^{1}	3
(Ukraine) K Bondarenko	7^{7}	6
Q	(Russia) A Kleybanova	6	6
6	(Hungary) Á Szávay	2	3
(China) S Peng	0	4
WC	(Belgium) Y Wickmayer	6	6
(Belarus) O Govortsova	3	6	5
Q	(Switzerland) T Bacsinszky	6	3	7
LL	(United States) J Ditty	4	6	6
8	(Ukraine) A Bondarenko	6	3	4

Second round
1	(Belgium) J Henin	6^{4}	6	6
Q	(Bulgaria) T Pironkova	7^{7}	3	1
(Ukraine) K Bondarenko	5	6	5
Q	(Russia) A Kleybanova	7	3	7
3	(Slovakia) D Hantuchová	6	6
WC	(Belgium) Y Wickmayer	4	3
Q	(Switzerland) T Bacsinszky	7	6
LL	(United States) J Ditty	5	4

Quarterfinals
1	(Belgium) J Henin	6	6
Q	(Russia) A Kleybanova	4	3
3	(Slovakia) D Hantuchová	2	6	1^{r}
Q	(Switzerland) T Bacsinszky	6	4	4

Semifinals
1	(Belgium) J Henin	2	6	6
Q	(Switzerland) T Bacsinszky	6	3	3

=== Bottom half ===
First round
5	(Austria) S Bammer	0	6	2
(Russia) Y Shvedova	6	3	6
(Italy) K Knapp	7^{7}	6
(France) N Dechy	6^{3}	4
WC	(Belgium) C Maes	5	3
(Japan) A Sugiyama	7	6
9	(China) N Li	6	6
(Russia) E Likhovtseva	1	1
(Slovakia) D Cibulková	6	3	6
(Israel) T Obziler	3	6	3
(United States) M Tu	1	2
LL	(Sweden) S Arvidsson	6	6

Second round
(Russia) Y Shvedova	6	4	2
(Italy) K Knapp	3	6	6
(Japan) A Sugiyama	3	4
4	(Switzerland) P Schnyder	6	6
9	(China) N Li	6	6
(Slovakia) D Cibulková	4	3
LL	(Sweden) S Arvidsson	6	7
2	(Russia) A Chakvetadze	3	5

Quarterfinals
(Italy) K Knapp	6	6^{1}	7^{7}
4	(Switzerland) P Schnyder	2	7^{7}	6^{2}
9	(China) N Li	7	6
LL	(Sweden) S Arvidsson	5	4

Semifinals
(Italy) K Knapp	6	7^{7}
9	(China) N Li	4	6^{5}
