= 2006 Proximus Diamond Games – Doubles =

Doubles
- 2006 Proximus Diamond Games

Final
- Champions: (Russia) Dinara Safina (Slovenia) Katarina Srebotnik
- Runners-up: (France) Stéphanie Foretz (Netherlands) Michaëlla Krajicek
- Score: 6–1, 6–1

Events
Singles	Doubles
← 2005 ·	Diamond Games	· 2007 →

Cara Black and Els Callens were the defending champions, but Callens did not compete this year. Black teamed up with Rennae Stubbs and lost in semifinals to Stéphanie Foretz and Michaëlla Krajicek.

Dinara Safina and Katarina Srebotnik won the title by defeating Stéphanie Foretz and Michaëlla Krajicek 6–1, 6–1 in the final.

== Seeds ==
1. (Zimbabwe) Cara Black / (Australia) Rennae Stubbs (semifinals)
2. (Russia) Dinara Safina / (Slovenia) Katarina Srebotnik (champions)
3. (Czech Republic) Květa Peschke / (Italy) Francesca Schiavone (quarterfinals, retired due to a right wrist sprain on Peschke)
4. (Greece) Eleni Daniilidou / (Spain) Anabel Medina Garrigues (semifinals)

== Draw ==
=== Key ===
- Q = Qualifier
- WC = Wild card
- LL = Lucky loser
- Alt = Alternate
- SE = Special exempt
- PR = Protected ranking
- ITF = ITF entry
- JE = Junior exempt
- w/o = Walkover
- r = Retired
- d = Defaulted
- SR = Special ranking

=== Draw ===
First round
1	(Zimbabwe) C Black (Australia) R Stubbs	6	6
(Poland) K Jans (Czech Republic) V Uhlířová	2	0
(Bosnia and Herzegovina) M Jugić-Salkić (Slovenia) T Križan	6	7
(Austria) D Klemenschits (Austria) S Klemenschits	2	5
3	(Czech Republic) K Peschke (Italy) F Schiavone	7	7
(France) S Cohen-Aloro (France) V Razzano	5	5
WC	(Belgium) K Flipkens (Belgium) C Maes	5	5
(France) S Foretz (Netherlands) M Krajicek	7	7
(Czech Republic) D Chládková (Germany) J Wöhr	2	7^{7}	3
Q	(Germany) A Bachmann (Belgium) L Butkiewicz	6	6^{4}	6
(Czech Republic) E Birnerová (Czech Republic) G Navrátilová	4	5
4	(Greece) E Daniilidou (Spain) A Medina Garrigues	6	7
(Ukraine) Y Beygelzimer (Romania) A Vanc	4	6	6
(United Kingdom) C Curran (Latvia) L Dekmeijere	6	2	1
(Poland) M Domachowska (Poland) A Rosolska	1	3
2	(Russia) D Safina (Slovenia) K Srebotnik	6	6

Quarterfinals
1	(Zimbabwe) C Black (Australia) R Stubbs	7	6^{7}	6
(Bosnia and Herzegovina) M Jugić-Salkić (Slovenia) T Križan	5	7^{9}	3
3	(Czech Republic) K Peschke (Italy) F Schiavone	4	0^{r}
(France) S Foretz (Netherlands) M Krajicek	6	0
Q	(Germany) A Bachmann (Belgium) L Butkiewicz	5	3
4	(Greece) E Daniilidou (Spain) A Medina Garrigues	7	6
(Ukraine) Y Beygelzimer (Romania) A Vanc	3	3
2	(Russia) D Safina (Slovenia) K Srebotnik	6	6

Semifinals
1	(Zimbabwe) C Black (Australia) R Stubbs	6	2	1
(France) S Foretz (Netherlands) M Krajicek	2	6	6
4	(Greece) E Daniilidou (Spain) A Medina Garrigues	6	6^{4}	2
2	(Russia) D Safina (Slovenia) K Srebotnik	4	7^{7}	6

Final
(France) S Foretz (Netherlands) M Krajicek	1	1
2	(Russia) D Safina (Slovenia) K Srebotnik	6	6
