= Klaartje Liebens =

Belgian tennis player

- Country (sports): Belgium
- Born: 11 January 1995 (age 30); Brussels
- Retired: 2017
- Plays: Right-handed (two-handed backhand)
- Prize money: $49,984

Singles
- Career record: 151–116
- Career titles: 5 ITF
- Highest ranking: No. 295 (16 February 2015)

Grand Slam singles results
- Australian Open Junior: 2R (2013)
- French Open Junior: Q1 (2013)
- Wimbledon Junior: Q1 (2012)
- US Open Junior: Q2 (2012)

Doubles
- Career record: 4–8
- Career titles: 0
- Highest ranking: No. 743 (20 May 2013)

Grand Slam doubles results
- Australian Open Junior: 1R (2013)
- US Open Junior: 1R (2012)

Klaartje Liebens (born 11 January 1995) is a Belgian retired tennis player.

Liebens won five singles titles on the ITF Circuit in her career. On 16 February 2015, she attained her best singles ranking of world No. 295. On 20 May 2013, she peaked at No. 743 in the doubles rankings.

She made her WTA Tour main-draw debut at the 2015 Diamond Games, defeating Barbora Krejčíková, Gioia Barbieri and Ysaline Bonaventure in the qualifying tournament.

Liebens announced her retirement from the professional tour in July 2017.

== ITF finals ==
=== Singles: 13 (5–8) ===
Legend $50,000 tournaments $25,000 tournaments $10,000 tournaments	Finals by surface Hard (4–7) Clay (1–0) Carpet (0–1)

Result	No.	Date	Tournament	Surface	Opponent	Score
Loss	1.	5 May 2013	ITF Sharm El Sheikh, Egypt	Hard	(Montenegro) Ana Veselinović	2–6, 3–6
Win	1.	14 September 2013	ITF Mytilene, Greece	Hard	(Greece) Maria Sakkari	6–2, 6–1
Loss	2.	20 October 2013	ITF Sharm El Sheikh	Hard	(Belgium) Elise Mertens	6–2, 2–6, 4–6
Loss	3.	27 October 2013	ITF Sharm El Sheikh	Hard	(Belgium) Elise Mertens	7–6^{(0)}, 1–6, 3–6
Loss	4.	10 November 2013	ITF Loughborough, Great Britain	Hard (i)	(United Kingdom) Anna Smith	3–6, 5–7
Win	2.	17 November 2013	ITF Manchester, UK	Hard (i)	(Slovakia) Natália Vajdová	7–5, 6–1
Loss	5.	15 December 2013	ITF Sharm El Sheikh	Hard	(United Kingdom) Katy Dunne	3–6, 0–6
Loss	6.	12 April 2014	ITF Gloucester, UK	Hard (i)	(United States) Bernarda Pera	3–6, 1–6
Win	3.	6 July 2014	ITF Brussels, Belgium	Clay	(Italy) Alice Matteucci	7–6^{(4)}, 4–6, 6–1
Win	4.	12 July 2014	ITF Balıkesir, Turkey	Hard	(France) Lou Brouleau	6–2, 6–2
Win	5.	14 December 2014	ITF Sharm El Sheikh	Hard	(Serbia) Vojislava Lukić	6–7^{(3)}, 6–2, 6–4
Loss	7.	20 February 2016	ITF Wirral, UK	Hard (i)	(Croatia) Silvia Njirić	6–3, 6–7^{(2)}, 3–6
Loss	8.	26 November 2016	ITF Solarino, Italy	Carpet	(Italy) Alice Matteucci	3–6, 6–7^{(1)}

=== Doubles: 1 (0–1) ===
Result	No.	Date	Tournament	Surface	Partner	Opponents	Score
Loss	1.	4 May 2013	ITF Sharm El Sheikh, Egypt	Hard	(Belgium) Lise Brulmans	(Russia) Anna Morgina (Russia) Yana Sizikova	3–6, 2–6
