= Kim Clijsters =

Belgian former tennis player (born 1983)

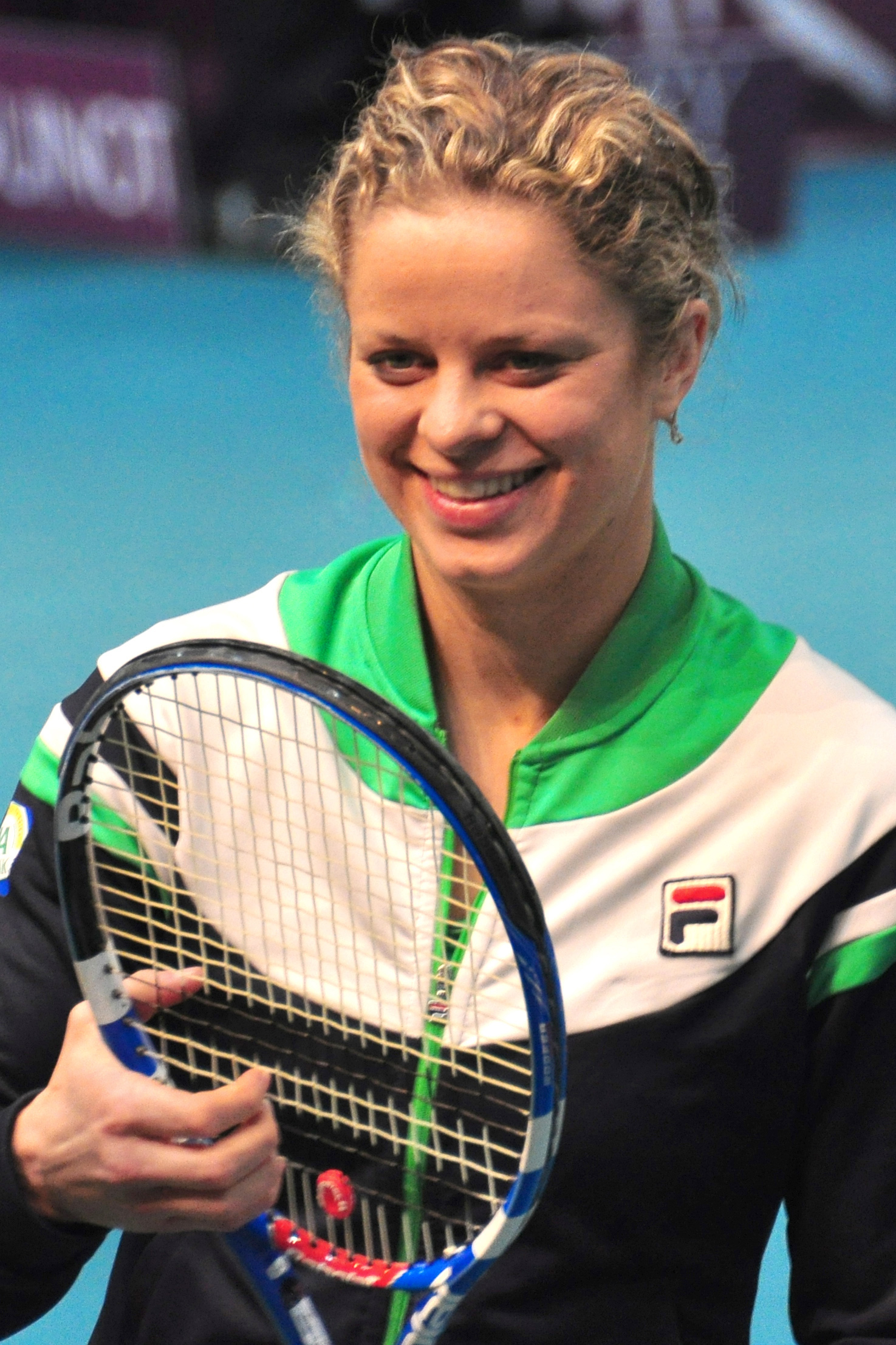
- Clijsters in 2011
- Country (sports): Belgium
- Residence: Bree, Belgium; New Jersey, U.S.
- Born: 8 June 1983 (age 43) Bilzen, Belgium
- Height: 1.74 m (5 ft 8½ in)
- Turned pro: 17 August 1997
- Retired: 2007–2009; 2012–2020; 12 April 2022
- Plays: Right-handed (two-handed backhand)
- Coach: Fred Hemmes Jr. (2020–2022)
- Prize money: US$24,545,194: 20th all-time in earnings
- Int. Tennis HoF: 2017 (member page)
- Official website: kimclijsters.com

Singles
- Career record: 523–132 (79.85%)
- Career titles: 41
- Highest ranking: No. 1 (11 August 2003)

Grand Slam singles results
- Australian Open: W (2011)
- French Open: F (2001, 2003)
- Wimbledon: SF (2003, 2006)
- US Open: W (2005, 2009, 2010)

Other tournaments
- Tour Finals: W (2002, 2003, 2010)
- Olympic Games: QF (2012)

Doubles
- Career record: 131–55
- Career titles: 11
- Highest ranking: No. 1 (4 August 2003)

Grand Slam doubles results
- Australian Open: QF (2003)
- French Open: W (2003)
- Wimbledon: W (2003)
- US Open: QF (2002)

Other doubles tournaments
- Tour Finals: F (2003)

Grand Slam mixed doubles results
- French Open: 3R (2000)
- Wimbledon: F (2000)
- US Open: 2R (2012)

Team competitions
- Fed Cup: W (2001)
- Hopman Cup: RR (2001, 2002, 2003, 2004)

Kim Antonie Lode Clijsters (Dutch pronunciation: [kɪm ˈklɛistərs]; born 8 June 1983) is a Belgian former professional tennis player. She was ranked as the world No. 1 in women's singles by the Women's Tennis Association (WTA) for 20 weeks, and as the world No. 1 in women's doubles for 4 weeks, having held both rankings simultaneously in 2003. She won 41 singles titles and 11 doubles titles on the WTA Tour, including four singles majors and two doubles majors (both partnering Ai Sugiyama), as well as three singles titles at the Tour Finals.

Clijsters competed professionally from 1997 in an era in which her primary rivals were compatriot Justine Henin and Serena Williams. Coming from a country with little historical success in tennis, she established Belgium as a leading force in women's tennis alongside Henin, as the two of them led their country to their first Fed Cup crown in 2001 and were the top two players in the world in late 2003. Following defeats in all of her first four major singles finals, Clijsters finally won her first singles major at the 2005 US Open.

Plagued by injuries and having lost desire to compete, Clijsters retired from tennis in 2007 at the age of 23 to get married and have a daughter. She returned to the sport two years later and stunned the tennis world by winning the US Open as an unranked player in just her third tournament back. She defended the US Open title the following year and then won the Australian Open in 2011, becoming the first mother to be ranked world No. 1. Along with Margaret Court, she co-holds the record for most major singles titles won as a mother (with three), and was the first mother to win one since Evonne Goolagong Cawley in 1980. Clijsters retired again following the 2012 US Open. She had a second, short-lived comeback from 2020 to 2022.

Clijsters was born to athletic parents with backgrounds in professional soccer and gymnastics. She was renowned for her athleticism, which was highlighted by her ability to perform splits on court in the middle of points. She built the offensive side of her game around controlled aggression while also using her exceptional movement to become an elite defensive player. Clijsters was very popular and well-liked as a player, winning the Karen Krantzcke Sportsmanship Award eight times. She was inducted into the International Tennis Hall of Fame in 2017.

== Early life and background ==
Kim Clijsters was born on 8 June 1983 in Bilzen, a small town in northeastern Belgium. She grew up with her younger sister Elke in the nearby town of Bree in the Flemish province of Limburg. Kim is the daughter of Lei Clijsters and Els Vandecaetsbeek, both of whom were accomplished athletes. Her mother Els was a Belgian national artistic gymnastics champion. Her father Lei was a professional soccer defender who played for a variety of clubs in the top-flight Belgian First Division, including KV Mechelen with whom he won the UEFA Cup Winners' Cup in 1988. He was also a member of the Belgium national soccer team, tallying 40 caps and competing in two World Cups. Clijsters credits her parents for giving her a footballer's legs and a gymnast's flexibility. She also attributes her success to the freedom they gave her when she was a young player, saying, "They've let me make my own decisions."

When Clijsters was five years old, her father built a clay tennis court at their home as a gift to his daughter to celebrate him winning the 1988 Gouden Schoen (player of the year in the Belgian First Division). Clijsters began playing tennis earlier that year after attending a lesson with her cousins and her uncle while her parents were away. From then on, she became fixated on the sport. She began playing with her sister at the Tennisdel club in Genk by the time she was seven. Her first coach Bart Van Kerckhoven recalled that she was extremely energetic and never wanted to leave the tennis court, adding that, "If the group before her did some sprints to finish off the session, Kim would join in. Then she put her heart and soul into her own training session, after which she joined the next group for their warm-up exercises."

At the age of nine, Clijsters began working with Benny Vanhoudt in the more distant town of Diest. Along with her sister, she trained for fifteen hours a week, including five hours of individual instruction, which Vanhoudt said was "an insane amount [of total hours]." She continued to train in Diest until she was twelve. During this time, she also first worked with Carl Maes and Wim Fissette, both of whom would coach Clijsters later in her professional career. When she was thirteen, Maes took over as her primary coach at the Flemish Tennis Association in Antwerp.

== Junior career ==
Clijsters had success at both the national and international levels at a very young age. In 1993, she won the 12-and-under division of the Belgian Junior Championships (the Coupe de Borman) in doubles with her future longtime rival Justine Henin. At the time, Clijsters was ten years old and Henin was eleven. A year later, she won the 12-and-under singles event at the same tournament. Clijsters continued to play alongside Henin, winning the doubles event at the 14-and-under European Junior Championships as well as the 14-and-under European Junior Team Championships for Belgium, both in 1996 and the latter of which also with Leslie Butkiewicz. Her first big international junior title came at Les Petits As, a high-level 14-and-under tournament. She defeated future top 25 players Iveta Benešová and Elena Bovina in the semifinals and final respectively.

Clijsters played two full seasons on the ITF Junior Circuit, the premier junior tour that is run by the International Tennis Federation (ITF). At the very end of 1997, she partnered with Zsófia Gubacsi to win her first ITF title in the doubles event at the Grade A Orange Bowl, one of the highest level junior tournaments. In 1998, Clijsters had her best year on the junior tour, finishing the season at career-high rankings of world No. 11 in singles and world No. 4 in doubles. She won two junior Grand Slam doubles titles, the French Open with Jelena Dokic and the US Open with Eva Dyrberg. She defeated her French Open partner Dokic in the US Open doubles final. In singles, she made it to the Wimbledon final, but finished runner-up to Katarina Srebotnik.

== Professional career ==
=== 1997–99: Maiden WTA title, Newcomer of the Year ===
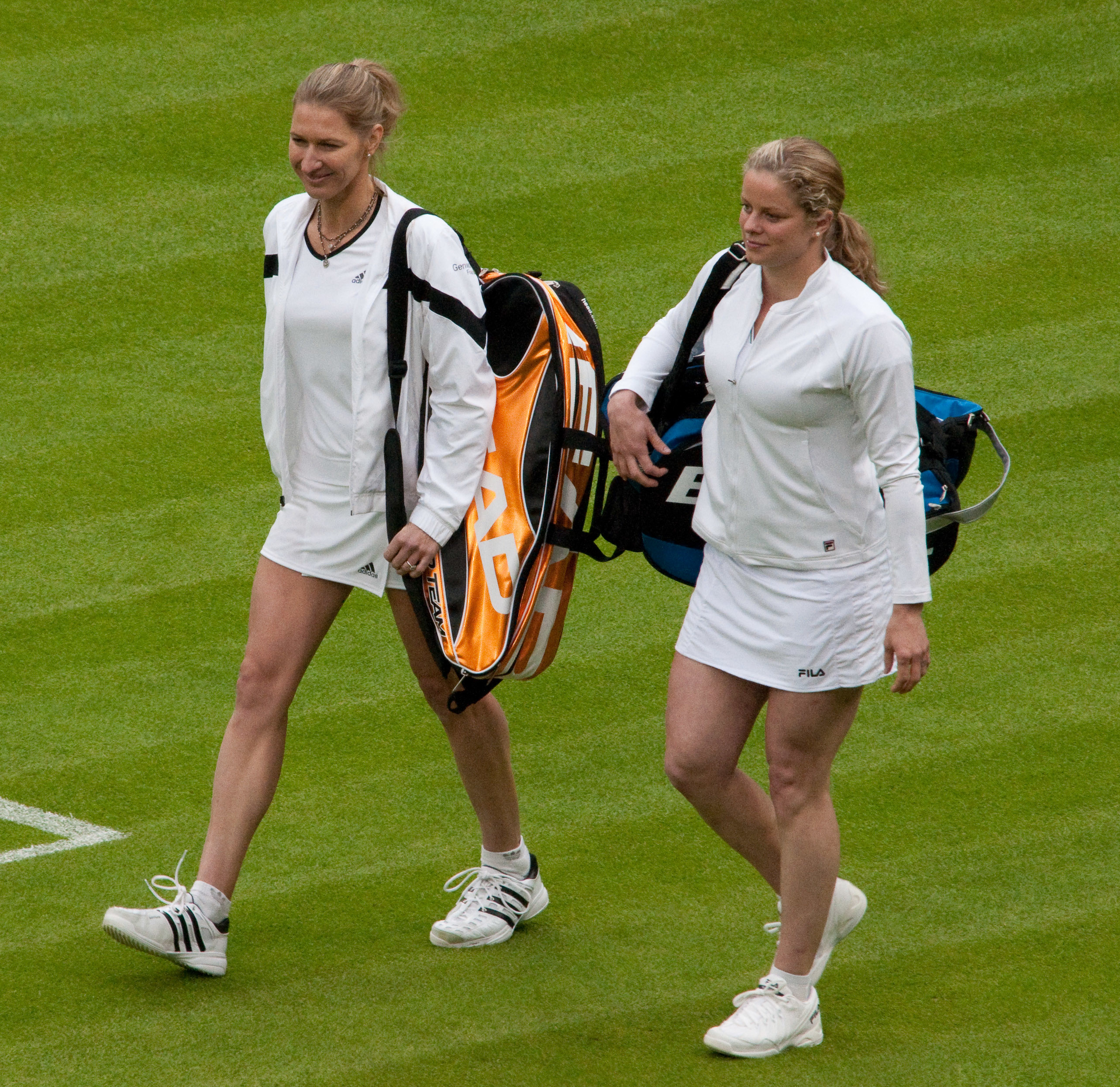
Clijsters (right) with her idol Steffi Graf in 2009. Graf won their only meeting on the WTA Tour in 1999.

As a fourteen year old, Clijsters could only enter professional tournaments through qualifying since the WTA Tour's policy did not allow players her age to receive main draw wild cards. In August 1997, Clijsters qualified for her first main draw at her second career tournament on the lower-level ITF Women's Circuit, which was held in the Belgian coastal town of Koksijde. She won seven matches in total, including five in qualifying, to reach the quarterfinals. Clijsters did not enter another professional tournament until after her runner-up finish at the Wimbledon girls' singles event the following summer. Playing in Brussels in July 1998, she won both the singles and doubles events for her first career professional titles. Clijsters continued to excel at the ITF level, winning four more titles within the next year, two in both singles and doubles.

Clijsters began 1999 with a WTA singles ranking of No. 420 in the world. Around this time, Belgian women's tennis was beginning to flourish. Both Dominique Van Roost and Sabine Appelmans had been ranked in the top 20 within the previous two years, complementing the rise of Clijsters and Henin on the junior tour. This success helped lead to the revival of the only WTA tournament in Belgium, which was relaunched as the Flanders Women's Open in Antwerp after not being held in six years. Clijsters made her WTA debut at the tournament in May, entering the main draw as a lucky loser after losing in the final round of qualifying. She won her first career tour-level match against Miho Saeki and advanced to the quarterfinals, where she was defeated by top seed Sarah Pitkowski despite holding match points.

One week after Clijsters turned sixteen, she entered Wimbledon as the youngest player in the top 200. After barely having a high enough ranking to get into the qualifying draw, she ultimately made it to the round of sixteen in her Grand Slam tournament debut. She defeated world No. 10 Amanda Coetzer in the third round and did not drop a set until losing to Steffi Graf one round later, her only career match against her childhood idol. Clijsters also had a good showing at the US Open, losing to the eventual champion Serena Williams in the third round after squandering a chance to serve for the match. Clijsters next played at the Luxembourg Open held in the town of Kockelscheuer just outside the capital. She won the title with relative ease in just her fourth career WTA event, taking affinity for the friendly atmosphere of the smaller tournament and the faster carpet courts. Most notably, she faced off against Van Roost in the final and only conceded four games to the top-ranked Belgian. Clijsters also made the singles final in Bratislava at her next tournament, finishing runner-up to No. 11 Amélie Mauresmo. Nonetheless, she was able to win the doubles event with compatriot Laurence Courtois as her partner. At the end of the season, Clijsters was named WTA Newcomer of the Year, having risen to No. 47 in the world.

=== 2000–02: French Open finalist, Tour champion ===
Clijsters was unable to repeat her success at the Grand Slam tournaments in 2000, not advancing past the second round at any of the singles events. However, she continued her steady climb in the rankings up to No. 18 on the strength of two more titles, one at the Tasmanian International in her first tournament of the year and another at the Sparkassen Cup in Germany near the end of the season. The latter victory was Clijsters's first at a Tier II event (the second highest level tournament) and followed up a loss in another Tier II final to world No. 1 Martina Hingis earlier that month. In the middle of the year, Clijsters also finished runner-up at the Wimbledon mixed doubles event alongside her boyfriend Lleyton Hewitt.

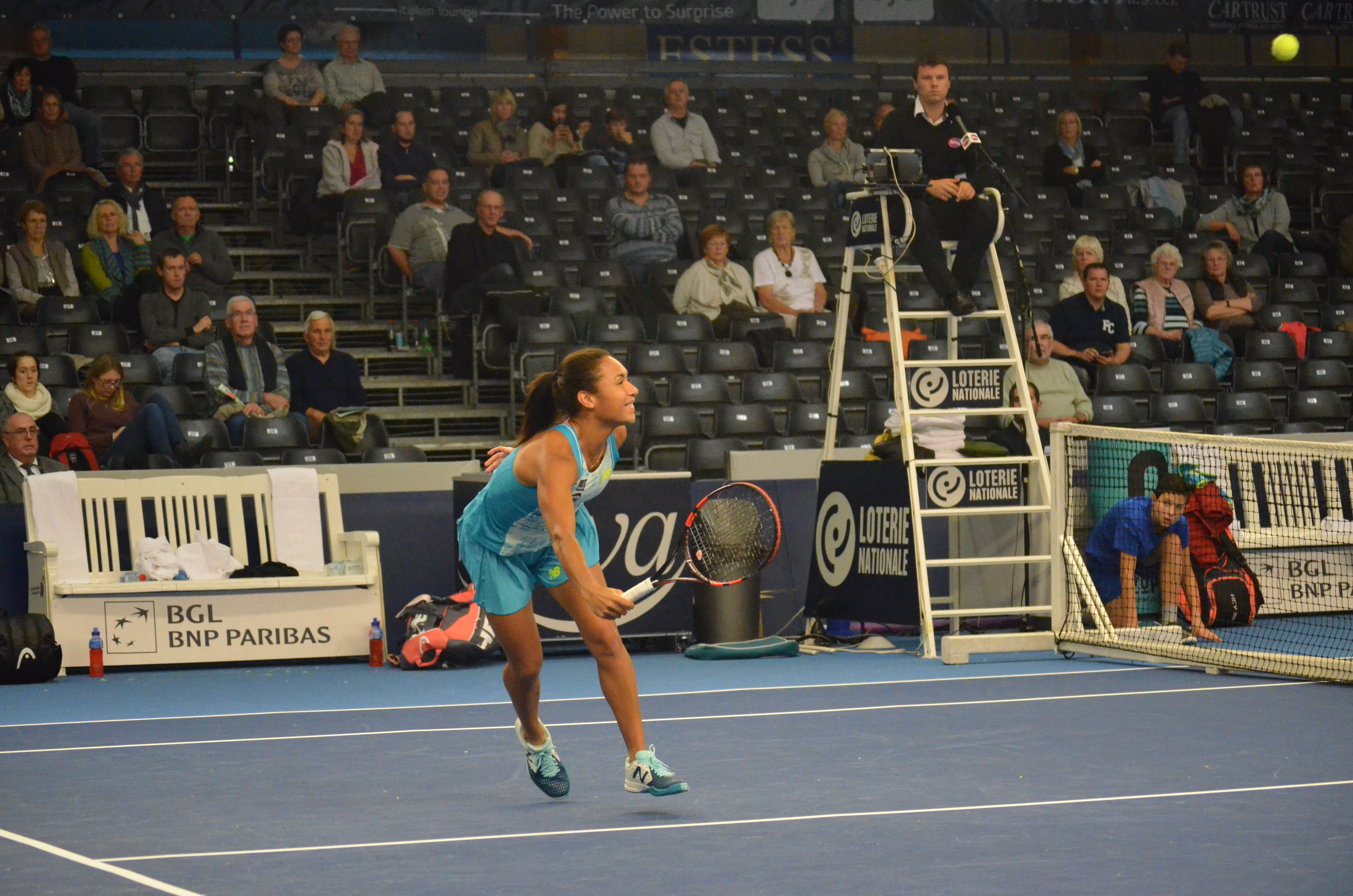
The Kockelscheuer Sport Centre (Heather Watson pictured), where Clijsters won five Luxembourg Open titles, including three consecutive from 2001 to 2003

At the Indian Wells Open in early 2001, Clijsters finally defeated Hingis in her fourth meeting against the world No. 1 player to reach her first Tier I final. After winning the first set of the final, she ended up losing in three sets to Serena Williams. The match was overshadowed by the controversy of the crowd booing Williams for her sister Venus's late withdrawal from their semifinal, leading to both sisters boycotting the tournament for 14 years. A few months later at the French Open, Clijsters became the first Belgian to contest a Grand Slam singles final. She had defeated No. 16 Henin in the semifinals in their closest and highest profile match to date, coming back from a set and a break down, and also having saved three break points that would have put her behind 5–2 in the second set. The final against Australian Open champion and world No. 4 Jennifer Capriati was an even tighter match. Playing a day after her 18th birthday, Clijsters won the first set but lost the second. After a French Open final record 22 games and 2 hours 21 minutes in total, she was defeated by Capriati 12–10 in the deciding set. The match was ranked as the greatest French Open women's final in Open Era history by Tennis.com. Clijsters would go on to make it to at least the quarterfinals at each of the next three majors. She also played in her first Grand Slam doubles final at Wimbledon later that year, with Ai Sugiyama as her partner. She won three singles titles in 2001, including her second titles at both the Luxembourg Open and the Sparkassen Cup, to help her finish the season at No. 5 in the world. With four doubles finals in total, she was also ranked No. 15 in doubles at the end of the year.

Clijsters maintained her top ten ranking throughout 2002 despite struggling with an ongoing shoulder injury in the first half of the year. Her best result at a Grand Slam event came at the Australian Open, where she lost another three-set match to Capriati in the semifinals in their first meeting since the French Open final. Nonetheless, she continued to rise in the rankings to No. 3 by March, her best ranking for the season. Although Clijsters did not reach another Grand Slam quarterfinal the rest of the year, she won three more titles leading up to the year-end WTA Tour Championships in Los Angeles. She received her third invite to the event, which only the top 16 players in the world are guaranteed entry. Clijsters made it to the final with ease after dropping only six games in the first three rounds, including a victory over Henin in the quarterfinals and a retirement due to injury from Venus Williams in the semifinals. Her opponent in the final was Serena Williams, who entered the match with a 56–4 record on the season and having won the last three majors of the year. Although Serena had won their first five encounters and was considered a clear favourite, Clijsters upset Serena in straight sets to win the championship. After the tournament, she said, "This is the best victory of my career."

=== 2003: World No. 1 in singles and doubles ===
The 2003 season was Clijsters's "annus mirabilis". She competed in 21 singles events, reaching the semifinals in all but one of them, advancing to 15 finals, and winning nine titles. With a record of 90–12, she was the first player to accrue 90 wins since Martina Navratilova in 1982 and the first to play more than 100 matches since Chris Evert in 1974. Clijsters also played an extensive doubles schedule, compiling a total of 170 matches between both disciplines. She partnered with Sugiyama the entire year, winning seven titles in thirteen events. This season also marked the peak of the rivalry between Clijsters and Henin, as the pair faced each other eight matches, the last six of which were in finals. In doubles, five of her ten finals were against the team of Virginia Ruano Pascual and Paola Suárez. With her success, Clijsters became the first Belgian world No. 1 in singles or doubles, achieving both feats in August.

==== Singles: Two Grand Slam finals, Tour Championship defense ====
Clijsters began her singles season by winning the Sydney International over Lindsay Davenport, her third consecutive title. She extended her tour win streak to 17 matches—all without dropping a set—before she was defeated by Serena Williams in an Australian Open semifinal where she had a 5–1 lead in the third set as well as two match points on serve. She said afterwards, "The only thing I regret a little bit, is those two double faults [to start the game at 5–4]. I could feel that she was really trying to step it up, and that she was hitting the balls a lot more aggressive and had almost no unforced errors at the end." Williams won the title to complete her "Serena Slam". After losing in the final at her next two tournaments, Clijsters recovered at the Indian Wells Open to win her first Tier I title. Like in Sydney, she defeated Davenport in the final. She won another Tier I title on clay in May at the Italian Open over No. 4 Amélie Mauresmo, who had a chance to serve for the match in the second set.

At the French Open, both Clijsters and Henin reached the final to guarantee that the winner would become the first Belgian Grand Slam singles champion. Henin had won their only meeting in a final in 2003 thus far at the German Open, which was also their only other encounter on clay. While both players had match points in Germany, Henin won in Paris in a lopsided affair where she only lost four games. After losing in the semifinals at Wimbledon to Venus Williams, Clijsters rebounded to win two Tier II titles at the Stanford Classic and the Los Angeles Open. With the second of those titles, she attained the world No. 1 ranking, in part because the top-ranked Serena Williams had not played on tour since Wimbledon due to a knee injury. She was the first woman to become No. 1 without winning a Grand Slam singles title. Clijsters regained the top ranking in doubles the following week to become only the fifth player in WTA history to be No. 1 in singles and doubles simultaneously. Despite playing the US Open as the top seed, Clijsters again lost to Henin in the final in straight sets. Clijsters had been regarded as the favourite entering the match because of her performance in the earlier rounds and Henin's lengthy semifinal match the previous day. The title helped Henin rise to No. 2 in the world.

The last stage of the season featured Clijsters battling Henin for the top ranking. Clijsters defeated Henin in the final of the Tennis Grand Prix in Filderstadt to defend her title and her world No. 1 ranking. This was the eighth time in WTA history where the top two players in the world faced off for the top ranking. Although Clijsters lost the top ranking to Henin the following week, she regained it a week later by winning the Luxembourg Open for the third year in a row. She finished her season by defending her title at the WTA Tour Championships in the first year where the tournament switched to a round robin format in the initial stage. Clijsters swept her group of Mauresmo, Elena Dementieva, and Chanda Rubin. She won her semifinal against Capriati before defeating Mauresmo again for the title. With the million dollar prize, Clijsters finished the season as the tour prize money leader and became the first player to earn four million dollars in a season on the WTA Tour. Nonetheless, Henin took the year-end No. 1 ranking by improving on her performance at the event from the previous season.

==== Doubles: French Open and Wimbledon titles ====
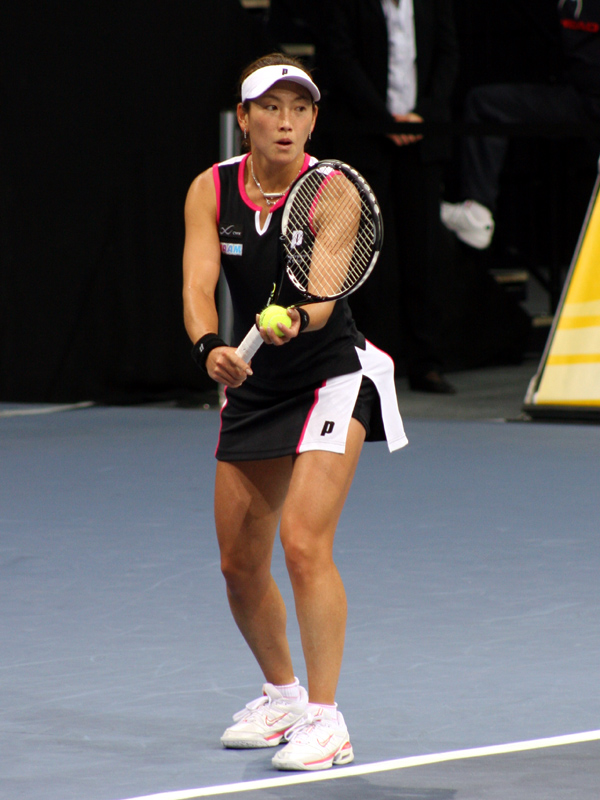
Ai Sugiyama, Clijsters's doubles partner in 2003

In the early part of the season, Clijsters and Sugiyama won three titles on hard courts. However, they did not win any big titles through May, losing in the Australian Open quarterfinals to the Williams sisters and finishing runners-up at their first two Tier I finals. They entered the French Open and Wimbledon and made it to the finals at both events. Clijsters and Sugiyama defeated the top seeds Ruano Pascual and Suarez in both finals for Clijsters's first two Grand Slam tournament titles. The French Open final was a tighter match, ending 9–7 in the third set. Despite these titles, the duo remained behind Ruano Pascual and Suarez in the rankings until August when Clijsters became world No. 1. She held the top ranking for four non-consecutive weeks. The pair were the top seeds at the US Open, but withdrew in the second round due to rain delaying Sugiyama's fourth round singles match for three days. They ended the season by finishing runners-up to Ruano Pascual and Suarez at the WTA Tour Championships. Despite Clijsters's success in 2003, she seldom played doubles during the rest of her career.

=== 2004–05: Extended injury absence, first Grand Slam singles title ===
Although Clijsters maintained her form into 2004, her season was ultimately marred by injuries. It was feared that she would need surgery and miss the Australian Open after she injured her left ankle in the Hopman Cup. Nonetheless, she competed at the event and reached the championship match without dropping a set, despite aggravating her ankle injury in the quarterfinals. Her opponent in the final was Henin and unlike their previous two Grand Slam finals, Clijsters was able to win a set. With Henin up a break at 4–3 in the third set, the chair umpire incorrectly overruled a line call on break point that would have leveled the match. Henin ended up winning the game and the match. Clijsters said afterwards, "I'm just as disappointed as after the last two grand slam [finals], but I played a lot better this time". In February, she won her next two tournaments, including the Diamond Games in Antwerp for her first WTA title in her home country. After Clijsters withdrew from the Indian Wells Open following one match with a torn left wrist tendon, she only played in two more WTA events the remainder of the season. She returned to the WTA Tour six weeks later with a wrist brace, but again withdrew after one match. In June, she found out she would need surgery to remove a cyst in her wrist. As a result, she remained out until the Hasselt Cup in Belgium where she needed to retire in her third match.

There were few expectations on Clijsters entering 2005, as it still was not certain whether she would be able to play. After missing the Australian Open, she returned to the tour in February. In her second and third tournaments back, Clijsters won both Tier I events in March, the Indian Wells Open and the Miami Open, to become the second woman to complete the Sunshine Double after Steffi Graf in 1994 and 1996. She defeated world No. 1 Lindsay Davenport in the final of Indian Wells, as well as No. 2 Amélie Mauresmo and No. 3 Maria Sharapova in her last two matches in Miami. These titles lifted her ranking from outside the top 100 back into the top 20. Clijsters was unable to continue her success into the clay or grass court seasons, winning just one title and losing in the fourth round in three sets to Davenport at both the French Open and Wimbledon.

"It's very hard to believe and an amazing feeling to have. After being out for so much of last year it's a little bit more special."

— Clijsters on winning the 2005 US Open, her first Grand Slam singles title.

After Wimbledon in late June, Clijsters only lost one more match through early October. During this stretch, she won five titles including her third Stanford Classic and her fifth Luxembourg Open. She also built up a 22-match win streak and defeated Henin in the final of the Tier I Canadian Open in their only meeting of the year. Clijsters's most important title of the season was the US Open, her first Grand Slam singles title. As the fourth seed, she was not tested until the quarterfinals, when Venus Williams was two games away from defeating her at a set and a break up. Clijsters rebounded to win the match in three sets and then defeated the top seed and world No. 2 Sharapova in the semifinals, also in three sets. Despite her previous struggles in Grand Slam singles finals, she won the championship against No. 13 Mary Pierce with ease, only conceding four games. As the winner of the US Open Series, Clijsters received double the standard amount of prize money. Her $2.2 million prize was the largest in women's sports history at the time. Clijsters's last tournament of the year was the WTA Tour Championships. Although she had a chance to return to No. 1 if she outperformed the top-ranked Davenport, she only won one match and did not advance out of her round robin group. She finished the year ranked No. 2, having won a tour-best nine titles and all of her finals. She was named both the WTA Player of the Year and the WTA Comeback Player of the Year. Despite this success, Clijsters announced in August that she was planning to retire in 2007 because of her injury troubles.

=== 2006–07: Return to No. 1, hastened retirement ===
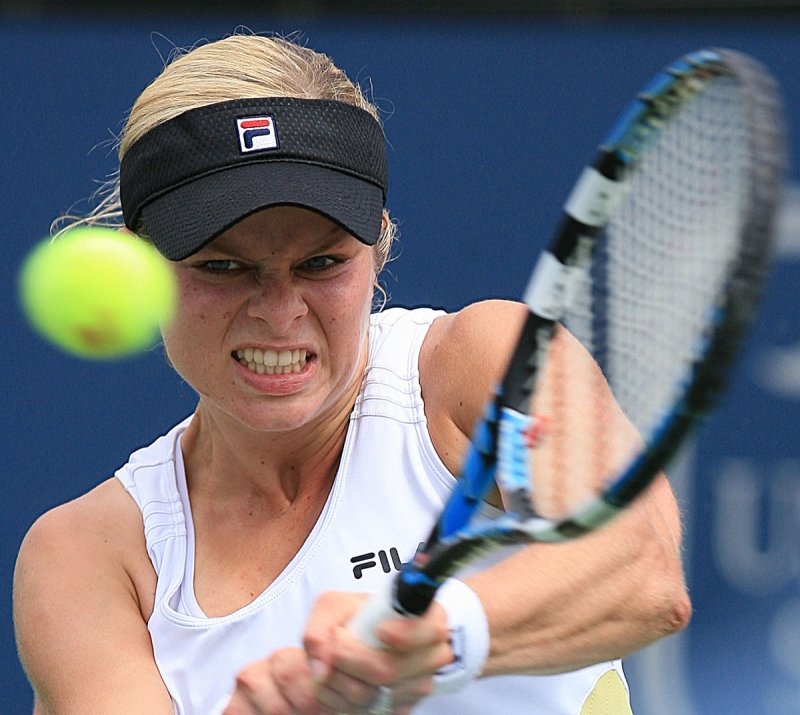
Clijsters in 2006

The 2006 season saw a variety of injury issues for Clijsters. She only played in 14 tournaments, missing the US Open as well as the Fed Cup final. While she reached the semifinals at the other three Grand Slam singles events, she was unable to advance to another final. Clijsters withdrew from her first tournament of the year, the Sydney International with hip and back problems. Although she recovered from those issues in time to reach the semifinals at the Australian Open, she needed to retire from that match as well after twisting her ankle while down a break in the third set against Amélie Mauresmo. Nonetheless, with Davenport losing in the quarterfinals, Clijsters regained the No. 1 ranking. She held the top ranking through mid-March. Clijsters returned for the Diamond Games where she finished runner-up to Mauresmo, but needed to withdraw from the Indian Wells Open because of the same ankle injury. While she was healthy enough to play a regular schedule during the clay and grass court seasons, Henin continued her recent dominance of their rivalry over this stretch. She defeated Clijsters in the semifinals of three consecutive events, including the French Open and Wimbledon.

During the US Open Series, Clijsters won her fourth Stanford Classic and finished runner-up to Maria Sharapova at the Tier I San Diego Classic. However, her summer season came to an end when she fell on her left wrist in her opening round match at the Canadian Open. This injury kept her out until late October. She made her return at the Hasselt Cup and won her second consecutive title at the event. Clijsters entered the WTA Tour Championships ranked No. 5 in the world, where all three other players she was grouped with were Russian. Although she lost to her group's top seed, Sharapova, she defeated Svetlana Kuznetsova and Elena Dementieva to advance. Her season ended in the semifinals, where she lost to world No. 1 Mauresmo.

Clijsters entered 2007 intending to retire at the end of the season, but only ended up playing in five tournaments due to injuries. She won her only title of the year in her first tournament, the Sydney International. The Australian Open was her only Grand Slam event of the season. For the second consecutive season, she lost in the semifinals, this time to top seed Sharapova. Clijsters's last tournament in Belgium was the Diamond Games, where she finished runner-up to Mauresmo for the second year in a row. A hip injury limited Clijsters's remaining schedule. In her last two tournaments, she lost to Li Na in the fourth round of the Miami Open in March and qualifier Julia Vakulenko in her opening match at the Warsaw Open in May. Her last win was against Samantha Stosur in Miami. A few days after losing in Warsaw, Clijsters announced her retirement at the age of 23, forgoing plans to finish the season.

=== Two-year hiatus ===
A few months after Clijsters retired, she married American basketball player Brian Lynch. She gave birth to a daughter in early 2008, less than two months after her father Leo Clijsters was diagnosed with lung cancer. Her father died in January 2009. Clijsters said, "The birth of Jada was the best moment of my life, but it also taught me a lesson because we knew that my Dad was terminally ill. I realised that new life had been born, but a few months later another life would disappear. It was a very intense period in our lives."

Nearly two months after her father's death, it was announced that Clijsters would play in an exhibition in May with Tim Henman against Steffi Graf and Andre Agassi to test the new retractable roof on Centre Court at Wimbledon. In March 2009, Clijsters stated that she was planning to come out of retirement, motivated by returning to the "training schedule from [her] pro days" to prepare for the Wimbledon exhibition. She added that she was taking a different approach to tennis, saying, "I am looking at this as a second career, not as a comeback as I am now in a situation where not everything revolves around tennis 24 hours a day." Clijsters and Henman won the exhibition doubles, and Clijsters also defeated her idol Graf in singles. She commented, "I wanted to feel good here on court. And I've enjoyed it. This is the pleasure which was lacking at the end of my first career. But now I've got my motivation back."

=== 2009–10: Start of second career, back-to-back US Open titles ===
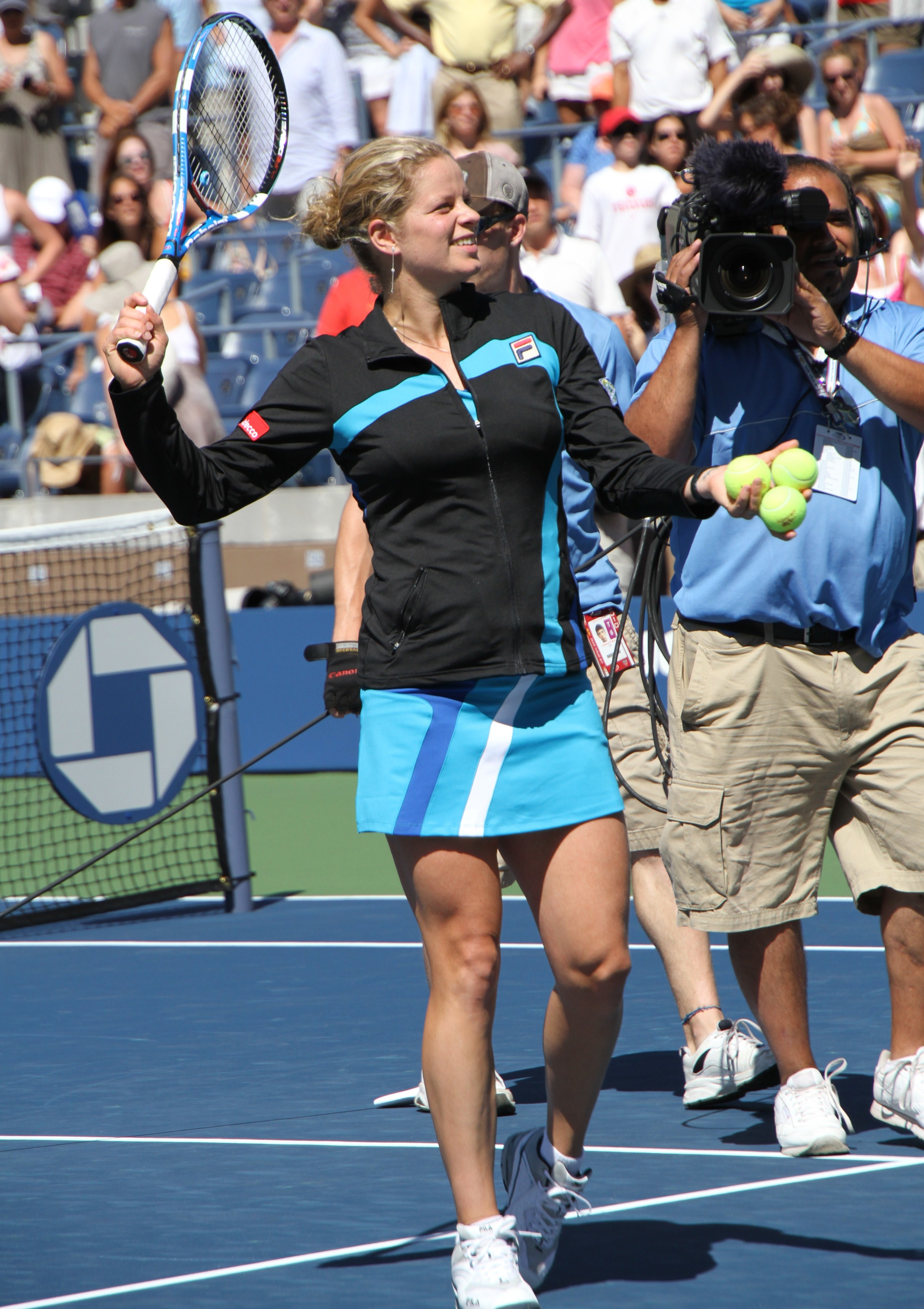
Clijsters at the 2010 US Open

With no ranking, Clijsters needed wild cards to begin her comeback. She requested and received wild cards for the Cincinnati Open, the Canadian Open, and the US Open. In her return to the tour in Cincinnati, Clijsters defeated three top 20 opponents, including No. 6 Svetlana Kuznetsova, before losing to world No. 1 Dinara Safina in the quarterfinals. She recorded another top ten victory in Canada over No. 9 Victoria Azarenka. Clijsters was still unranked entering the US Open, as players needed three tour events to have a ranking at the time. Nonetheless, she made it to the final, notably upsetting both Williams sisters, No. 3 Venus in the fourth round and No. 2 Serena in the semifinals. She defeated Venus in a tight third set after they split the first two 6–0. Clijsters then defeated No. 8 Caroline Wozniacki to win her second US Open championship. She became the first unseeded woman to win the title at the event, and the first mother to win a Grand Slam singles title since Evonne Goolagong Cawley in 1980. With the title, she entered the WTA rankings at No. 19. Her only other tournament of the year was the Luxembourg Open, where she lost her second match. At the end of the season, she won the WTA Comeback Player of the Year award for the second time.

Clijsters planned a limited schedule for 2010 to keep her focus on her family and ended up playing just eleven tournaments. In her first event of the year, she won the Brisbane International, narrowly defeating Henin in a third set tiebreak in Henin's first tournament back from her own retirement. She entered the Australian Open as one of the favourites, but was upset by No. 19 Nadia Petrova in the third round, only winning one game in that loss. Clijsters did not return to the tour until March. After an early loss at the Indian Wells Open, she won the Miami Open for the second time. The only set she lost was in the semifinals to Henin, who she again defeated in a third set tiebreak. She only conceded three games in the final against Venus Williams. During the clay court season, Clijsters tore a muscle in her left foot, which kept her out of the French Open. Although she returned for Wimbledon, she was upset in the quarterfinals by Vera Zvonareva after recording another win over Henin in the previous round.

"That defeat against Zvonareva at Wimbledon was hard to take. It had been perhaps my best and last chance to reach the final. In the semifinal of the US Open, I was absolutely bent on gaining revenge. And I succeeded, too... I'd become the player I'd always wanted to be."

— Clijsters on the 2010 US Open final.

In the latter half of the year, Clijsters entered only four tournaments. During the US Open Series, she won the Cincinnati Open, the tournament where she returned from retirement a year earlier. At her next event, she was eliminated in the quarterfinals of the Canadian Open by Zvonareva while struggling with a thigh injury. Nonetheless, Clijsters recovered to defend her title at the US Open. In the last three rounds, she defeated three top ten players in No. 6 Samantha Stosur, No. 4 Venus Williams, and No. 8 Vera Zvonareva. Venus came the closest to ending her title defense, but lost in three sets after serving two double faults in the second set tiebreak which could have won her the match. Clijsters won the final over Zvonareva with ease in less than an hour. This was her third consecutive title at the US Open and the fourth consecutive time she made it to the championship match, having skipped the tournament four times since 2003. Clijsters's final event of the season was the WTA Tour Championships, where she qualified for the seventh time. Despite a loss to Zvonareva in her last round robin match, she advanced to the knockout rounds and defeated No. 5 Stosur and world No. 1 Caroline Wozniacki for her third title at the year-end championships. Clijsters finished the season at No. 3 and was named WTA Player of the Year for the second time.

=== 2011–12: Australian Open champion, last reign at No. 1 ===
By the start of 2011, Clijsters knew she was planning to retire in 2012 as she did not want to be on the tour while her daughter was in school. She began the season at the Sydney International, where she finished runner-up to Li Na in straight sets despite winning the first five games of the match. The two also met in the final of their next tournament, the Australian Open. Although Clijsters again lost the first set, she recovered to win the championship, her fourth Grand Slam singles title and first outside of the US Open. This title would be the last of Clijsters's career. She made one last final at her next WTA event, the Paris Open, where she was defeated by Petra Kvitová. Nonetheless, this result helped Clijsters regain the world No. 1 ranking before Caroline Wozniacki took it back one week later. During the rest of the season, Clijsters was limited by a variety of injuries and only played five more tournaments. She needed to retire from a fourth round match at the Indian Wells Open due to a shoulder injury. Then, as a result of a right ankle injury suffered while dancing at a wedding in April, the French Open was the only clay court event she entered. At the second Grand Slam tournament of the year, she was upset in the second round by No. 114 Arantxa Rus after failing to convert two match points in the second set. Aggravating that ankle injury at her next event then forced her to miss Wimbledon. Clijsters returned for the Canadian Open, where she suffered an abdominal injury that kept her out the remainder of the season.

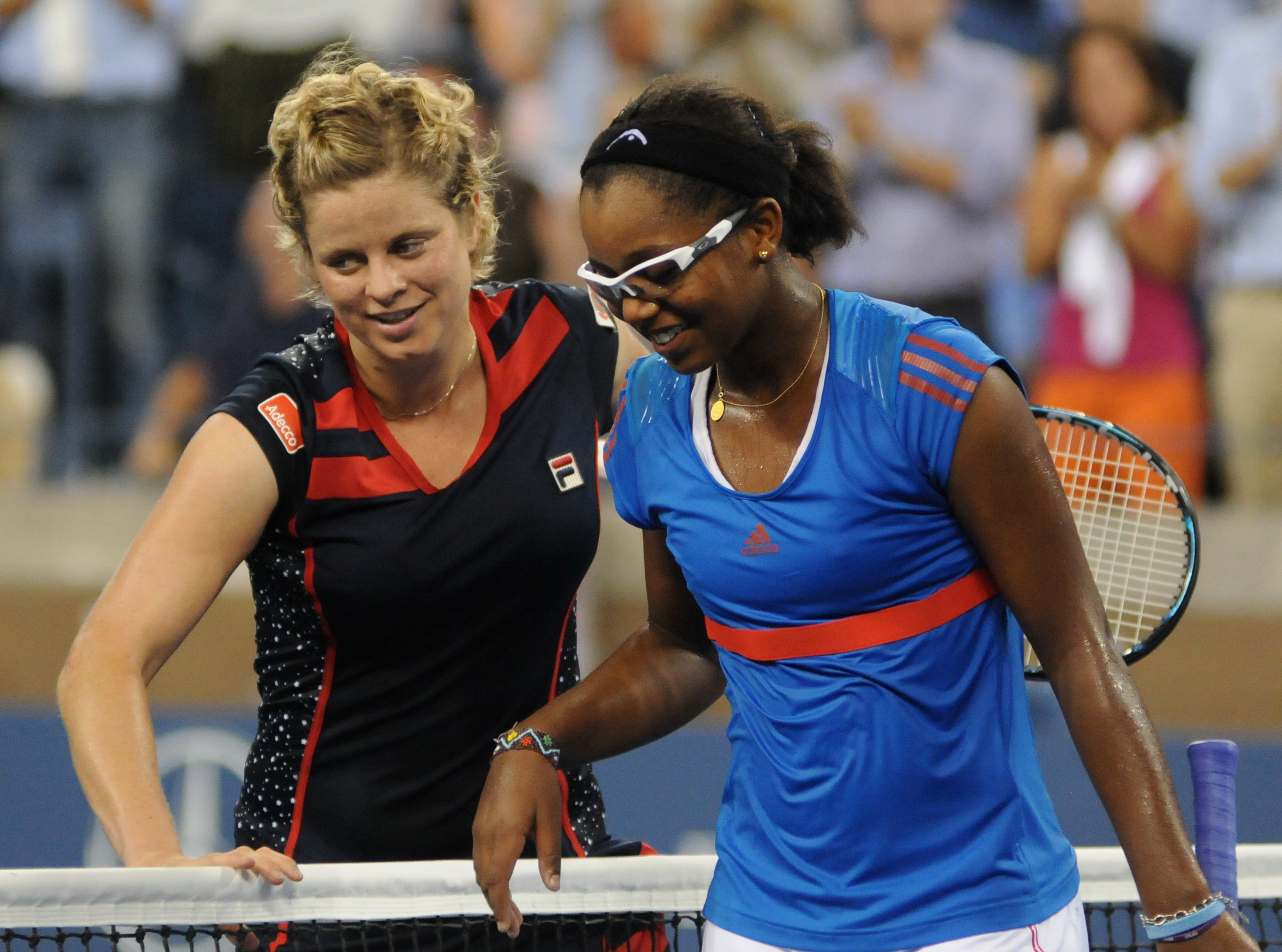
Clijsters after her last WTA singles match win against Victoria Duval

Clijsters was unable to stay healthy in her last year on the WTA Tour. In the first week of the season, she returned to the tour for the Brisbane International. After winning her first three matches back, she needed to retire in the semifinals due to hip spasms, a precautionary measure to prepare for the Australian Open. As the defending champion at the year's first Grand Slam event, Clijsters made it to the semifinals. Her fourth round victory came against No. 5 Li Na in a rematch of the 2011 final. She overcame rolling her ankle in the first set and saved four match points at 6–2 in the second set tiebreak to win in three sets. After Clijsters defeated world No. 1 Caroline Wozniacki in the quarterfinals, she lost to No. 3 Victoria Azarenka in another three-set match. Both her hip and ankle continued to trouble her for months after the tournament, forcing her to skip the clay court season. After playing once in March and returning in mid-June, the last WTA events of Clijsters's career were the final two Grand Slam tournaments of the season. She lost at Wimbledon in the fourth round to No. 8 Angelique Kerber, only winning two games. Clijsters entered the US Open having not lost a match there since the 2003 final. She recorded her last WTA singles match win against Victoria Duval in the first round before falling to Laura Robson in her next match. Her career ended with a second round mixed doubles loss alongside Bob Bryan to the eventual champions Ekaterina Makarova and Bruno Soares, at which point she officially retired.

=== 2020–22: Second comeback ===
After more than seven years of retirement, Clijsters returned to professional tennis in February 2020 at the Dubai Tennis Championships as a wildcard. Clijsters lost to Australian Open runner-up Garbiñe Muguruza in the opening round. She next entered the Monterrey Open as a wildcard losing in the first round to Johanna Konta. No tournaments were played due to the COVID-19 pandemic from March to July. Clijsters received wildcards at the inaugural Top Seed Open in singles and doubles alongside Sabine Lisicki. Clijsters withdrew from both singles and doubles. Clijsters next played the US Open on a main draw wildcard losing in the first round to Ekaterina Alexandrova. Clijsters underwent knee surgery in October and did not play another tournament in 2020.

Clijsters pulled out of the 2021 Miami Open, saying she did not feel ready to compete after her surgery and contracting COVID-19 in January. She played her first tournament of the year at the Chicago Fall Tennis Classic, having accepted a wildcard, but lost in the first round to Hsieh Su-Wei in three sets. She entered the doubles draw too, the partner was Kirsten Flipkens, but they lost in the first round. Clijsters then participated in postponed Indian Wells Masters, drew Kateřina Siniaková and lost in three sets in the first round. Clijsters played a number of matches for World TeamTennis in 2021, aligned with the New York Empire.

With many tournaments having been postponed due to the COVID-19 pandemic, Clijsters had only been able to play five matches within the two years that she had returned to the tour. On 12 April 2022, Clijsters announced that she was ending her comeback and again retiring from tennis, citing a desire to focus more on family life.

=== Career beyond tennis ===
==== Business ventures ====
In February 2026, Kim Clijsters became a minority investor in Birmingham City Women FC, joining the club's ownership structure to support its strategic development.

== National representation ==
=== Fed Cup ===
Clijsters made her Fed Cup debut for Belgium in 2000 at the age of 16. The top-tier World Group that year consisted of 13 teams, 12 of which were divided into three round robin groups. The winners of the round robin groups in April would compete with the defending champion United States team in a knockout format for the title in November. Belgium was placed in a group with Australia, France, and Russia. Each tie was contested over one day as a best-of-three rubbers, two in singles and the last in doubles. Clijsters only played singles, while Els Callens and Laurence Courtois played all three doubles matches. Although Clijsters narrowly lost her debut to Jelena Dokic of Australia by a score of 9–7 in the third set, her teammates were able to secure the tie. She won her other two matches against Nathalie Tauziat of France and Anna Kournikova of Russia, both of which were crucial as Belgium won each of those ties 2–1 as well to win the group. In the semifinals, Henin returned to the team as they faced the United States. After Henin lost to Monica Seles, Clijsters needed to defeat Lindsay Davenport to keep Belgium in the tournament. She won the second set, but ultimately lost the match.

The following year, the format for the Fed Cup changed again. The three round robin pools were reduced to two and the winners of each pool would contest a final tie for the title. Belgium's team of Clijsters, Henin, Callens, and Courtois from the 2000 final all returned for 2001. With Henin and Clijsters exclusively playing singles, and Callens and Courtois playing doubles, Belgium won all nine of their rubbers against Spain, Germany, and Australia to advance to the final. Facing Russia, Henin defeated Nadia Petrova and Clijsters defeated Elena Dementieva to secure Belgium's first Fed Cup crown. Courtois commented, "We were never under any pressure, mainly because Kim and Justine were so strong."

While Clijsters and Henin were on the team, Belgium came closest to another Fed Cup triumph in 2006. In this year, the World Group consisted of eight teams in a knockout tournament. In the first round against Russia, both Clijsters and Henin made themselves available and won three out of four singles matches to advance. Although Henin missed the semifinal, Clijsters and Kirsten Flipkens were able to lead Belgium to a victory over the United States, who were also short-handed without Lindsay Davenport or the Williams sisters. However, Clijsters was forced to miss the Fed Cup final due to a wrist injury. Henin and Flipkens returned for the final, which Belgium hosted against Italy. The tie was decided by the doubles rubber, which Belgium lost after Henin aggravated a knee injury she suffered in one of her singles rubbers and needed to retire down 2–0 in the third set.

Clijsters also played on the Belgium Fed Cup team from 2002 to 2005, and 2010–11 after she returned from retirement. The team's best results in those years were two semifinal appearances in 2003 and 2011. Clijsters missed the ties in which Belgium was eliminated in both instances. Overall, Clijsters compiled a 24–4 record in Fed Cup, split across 21–3 in singles and 3–1 in doubles.

=== Hopman Cup ===
Clijsters participated in the Hopman Cup from 2001 to 2004, partnering with Olivier Rochus in the first instance and Xavier Malisse thereafter. The tournament consists of eight teams, each with one female and one male player from the same country. The teams are divided into two round robin groups, the winners of which compete for the title. Each tie consists of a women's singles match, a men's singles match, and a mixed doubles match. The Belgian team did not advance to final in any of the years Clijsters participated. Their best performances came in 2002 and 2003 when they won two out of three round robin ties.

In 2002, they finished tied for first with the United States and Italy in a group that also featured France. Belgium's only loss came against the United States, with Clijsters and Malisse losing both singles matches to Monica Seles and Jan-Michael Gambill respectively. Although the United States lost to Italy, they advanced out of the group on the tiebreak criteria, having won six rubbers compared to the five won by each of Belgium and Italy. Both of the ties Belgium had won were by a score of 2–1, with Clijsters losing to Francesca Schiavone against Italy and the pair losing the mixed doubles against the French team of Virginie Razzano and Arnaud Clément. The following year, Clijsters and Malisse again lost to the United States, who fielded a different team of Serena Williams and James Blake.

=== Olympics ===
Clijsters did not compete at the Olympics until 2012 near the end of her career. She had been ranked inside the top 40 in the months leading up to the 2000 Sydney Olympics in September, high enough to qualify. However, she did not make herself available for selection for a variety of reasons including issues with her shoulder and the event's timing a week after the US Open. During the 2004 Athens Olympics, she was in the middle of a long absence from competition after undergoing wrist surgery. However, she had announced before the year began that she did not intend to compete at the Games because Adidas was the Belgian team's uniform sponsor and her contract with Fila forbade her from wearing clothing from another company. The 2008 Beijing Olympics took place during her first retirement.

Clijsters's desire to represent Belgium at the Olympics was one of the underlying reasons why she prolonged her second career until the 2012 London Games in late July. At the time, she did not have good results at her most recent tournaments, withdrawing from the Rosmalen Grass Court Championships in the semifinals in June due to injury and suffering a lopsided loss in the fourth round at Wimbledon. In her Olympic debut, Clijsters won her first three matches in straight sets, defeating Roberta Vinci, Carla Suárez Navarro, and No. 12 Ana Ivanovic in succession. She faced No. 3 Maria Sharapova in the quarterfinals, losing in straight sets one match before the medal rounds.

== Rivalries ==
=== Clijsters vs. Henin ===
Clijsters's biggest rival was Justine Henin. Their rivalry began during their junior years when they were both considered promising young talents. They started out as friends and won the Belgian Junior Championships as doubles partners at ages ten and eleven respectively, despite only being able to communicate with hand signals due to Clijsters not knowing French and Henin not knowing Flemish. However, their friendship began to fade by their mid-teens, leading to disputes that their coaches would try to keep out of the media. Clijsters attributed this deterioration in part to one of Henin's coaches telling Henin, "she had to hate all of her opponents, and only then could she win." She also acknowledged they had very different personalities.

Clijsters and Henin typically downplayed any disagreements between them, saying they were overdramatized by the media. When they were professionals, Clijsters accused Henin of routinely faking injuries in their matches to receive medical timeouts. Additionally, Clijsters's father seemed to allege that Henin was taking performance-enhancing drugs. Although they had won the Fed Cup together in 2001, they were not interested in playing on the same team in 2004 or 2005. The following year, Clijsters's former coach Carl Maes, who was then the Belgium Fed Cup captain, helped convince Clijsters to reunite with Henin, and together they ultimately reached another final.

On the court, they played each other in 25 WTA matches, making each of them the other's most frequent opponent. Although Clijsters won the series 13–12, Henin won seven out of their eleven meetings in finals including all three at Grand Slam tournaments. The latest stage win Clijsters had at a major was in the semifinals of the 2001 French Open. She also defeated Henin en route to her first WTA Tour Championship in 2002. Clijsters dominated their hard court meetings 8–4, while Henin dominated on clay 5–1. Henin also won three of their five grass court encounters. Before both of their first retirements, Henin was leading the series 12–10. However, Clijsters won all three of their meetings during their comebacks to win the series.

=== Clijsters vs. Williams sisters ===
The Williams sisters were both No. 1 in the world and combined for 15 Grand Slam singles titles while Clijsters was on tour. Clijsters had a record of just 2–7 against Serena, who she called her toughest opponent. She fared better against Venus, compiling a winning record of 7–6.

Clijsters's rivalry with Serena included two of the biggest controversies in Serena's career: the 2001 Indian Wells final which led to both Williams sisters' long boycott of the tournament, and the 2009 US Open semifinal which Serena lost on a point penalty. Serena defeated Clijsters in their first five meetings. She also won all four of their three-set encounters, including their 1999 US Open third round match and their 2003 Australian Open semifinal where Clijsters had the opportunity to serve for both matches. Although Clijsters only had two wins against Serena, both were considered big upsets and among the most important wins of her career. Her victory in the 2002 WTA Tour Championship final gave Clijsters her biggest title at the time, and her win at the 2009 US Open set up her first Grand Slam singles title as a mother one match later. Clijsters also defeated Venus in both of those tournaments, making her the only player to record wins over both Williams sisters at the same event twice.

Venus also initially dominated her rivalry with Clijsters. She won six of their first eight meetings, including two in the late stages of Grand Slam tournaments in the quarterfinals of the 2001 US Open and the semifinals of 2003 Wimbledon. Venus also eliminated Clijsters from the Diamond Games in Belgium twice in 2003 and 2005. Additionally, one of Clijsters's first two wins against Venus was a retirement due to injury at the 2002 WTA Tour Championships. Nonetheless, Clijsters rebounded to win their last five meetings and end her career leading in their head-to-head record. Three of those five victories came at the US Open en route to her three titles at the event in 2005, 2009, and 2010.

=== Other rivals ===
In addition to Henin and the Williams sisters, Clijsters also developed rivalries with several other players who had been ranked No. 1 in the world. Two of her most frequent opponents were Lindsay Davenport and Amélie Mauresmo. Clijsters narrowly had winning records against both of them, going 9–8 versus Davenport and 8–7 versus Mauresmo. Davenport had won six of their first seven meetings before Clijsters won eight of their next nine encounters, including all five in 2003. Clijsters defeated Davenport in all four of their meetings in finals, including two at the Indian Wells Open. While Davenport had a 5–1 lead in Grand Slam tournaments, Clijsters won their latest-stage such meeting in the semifinals of the 2003 US Open. Unlike against Davenport, Clijsters initially dominated her rivalry with Mauresmo, winning eight of their first ten matches before Mauresmo took the last five. They met in two WTA Tour Championship finals, which they split. Mauresmo also denied Clijsters chances to win more titles in her home country when she won their finals at both the 2006 and 2007 Diamond Games.

== Exhibition matches ==
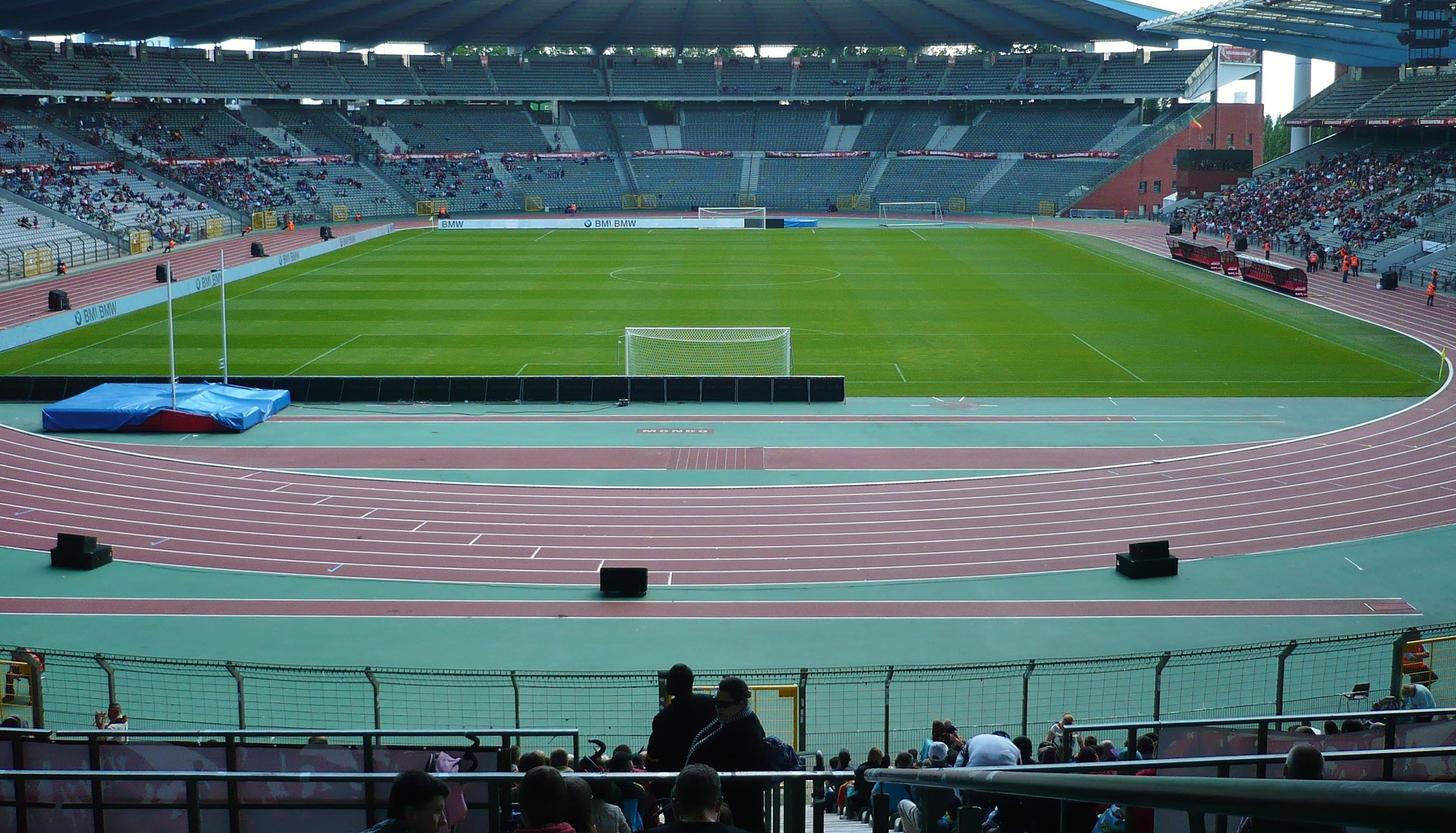
King Baudouin Stadium, the site of the record-setting match between Clijsters and Serena Williams

During Clijsters's first retirement, the invitation to participate in the roof test exhibition series at Wimbledon in May 2009 inspired her to return to the WTA Tour. In the summer, she joined the St. Louis Aces of the World Team Tennis league to help prepare for her comeback. She also participated in World Team Tennis the following year as a member of the New York Sportimes. Ten years after the roof test on Centre Court that inspired her comeback, Clijsters returned to Wimbledon to participate in an exhibition series to test the new roof on Court No. 1 in which she played a set of singles against Venus Williams as well as a set of mixed doubles.

On 8 July 2010, an exhibition match between Clijsters and Henin was scheduled as an attempt to set a new world record for largest attendance at a tennis match. The contest took place at the King Baudouin Stadium and was a part of the Best of Belgium national festival. After Henin needed to withdraw from the match due to an elbow injury, Serena Williams was chosen as a replacement. Clijsters defeated Williams in straight sets. A total of 35,681 people attended the match, breaking the world record of 30,472 set in 1973 by the Battle of the Sexes between Billie Jean King and Bobby Riggs.

Beginning in 2009, the Diamond Games in Antwerp was reorganized from a WTA tournament into an exhibition series. During her comeback, Clijsters played at the event three times, winning matches against Venus Williams in 2009, Henin in 2010, and world No. 1 Caroline Wozniacki in 2011. She continued to play at the event after retiring. The 2012 edition was named "Kim's Thank You Games" in honor of her retirement, and the following year the event was known as the Kim Clijsters Invitational. In 2015, the Diamond Games were revived as a WTA event with Clijsters serving as the tournament director. She also played an exhibition set with finalist Andrea Petkovic after her opponent withdrew before the start of the championship match due to injury.

Since her retirement in 2012, Clijsters has regularly played in the legends, champions, and invitation doubles events at all four Grand Slam tournaments. One of her matches in the 2017 Wimbledon ladies' invitation doubles event drew public interest for Clijsters inviting a male spectator onto the court to play a few points. The spectator, Chris Quinn, had suggested Clijsters try a body serve when she had asked the crowd whether she should serve left or right. Before playing the points, she gave Quinn a women's shirt and skort so that he could abide by Wimbledon's all-white dress code. A video of the incident has over four million views on YouTube.

== Legacy ==
Clijsters has been ranked as the 14th-greatest women's tennis player in the Open Era by Tennis.com. Her 41 singles titles are the 14th-most in the Open Era. Since 2000, only the Williams sisters, Justine Henin, and Maria Sharapova have won more than her four Grand Slam singles titles. The three titles she won at the WTA Tour Championships are tied for the fifth-most in history behind only Martina Navratilova, Steffi Graf, Serena Williams, and Chris Evert. Clijsters was a champion at all four Grand Slam tournaments, winning the French Open and Wimbledon in doubles and the US Open and Australian Open in singles. Her prowess at singles and doubles is also highlighted by her becoming one of six players in WTA history to be No. 1 in the world in both rankings at the same time.

Clijsters and Henin are recognized for "putting Belgium on the tennis map". Before they established themselves in the upper echelon of women's tennis, Dominique Van Roost was the only player in Belgian history to be ranked in the top ten of the ATP or WTA rankings, a mark she did not achieve until 1998 after Clijsters and Henin turned professional. The Belgium Fed Cup team had never reached the quarterfinals until 1997 when they made the semifinals. With Clijsters on the team, Belgium made it to at least the semifinals four times, reaching the final in 2006 and winning the championship in 2001. She also became the first Belgian to be ranked No. 1 in each of singles and doubles. Belgium was regarded as dominating women's tennis when Clijsters and Henin were the top two players in the world for several months in late 2003.

After Clijsters's retirement, she established a now defunct tennis school, the Kim Clijsters Academy in her hometown of Bree. The academy (in 2022 sold by Clijsters and turned into a padel club by businessmen including Marc Coucke) used to be run by Clijsters's longtime coach Carl Maes and was intended to serve young players.

Clijsters was one of the most popular and well-liked players in tennis among both fans and her fellow players. She won the Karen Krantzcke Sportsmanship Award a record eight times. Clijsters was proud of her reputation as one of the nicest players on the WTA Tour, saying, "I always try every day to be a good person and to be nice to others, and I think that's probably the most important thing. I'm proud that I won tournaments and everything, but I want players to think that Kim was a nice person." Clijsters was also regarded as a source of inspiration to mothers on the WTA Tour, a role she embraced. She is one of three mothers to win a Grand Slam singles title, and her three such titles are tied with Margaret Court for the most of all time. Additionally, Clijsters is the only mother to be ranked No. 1 in the world since the start of the WTA rankings in 1975. She appeared on the Time 100 list in 2011 in large part because of her successful comeback.

== Playing style ==
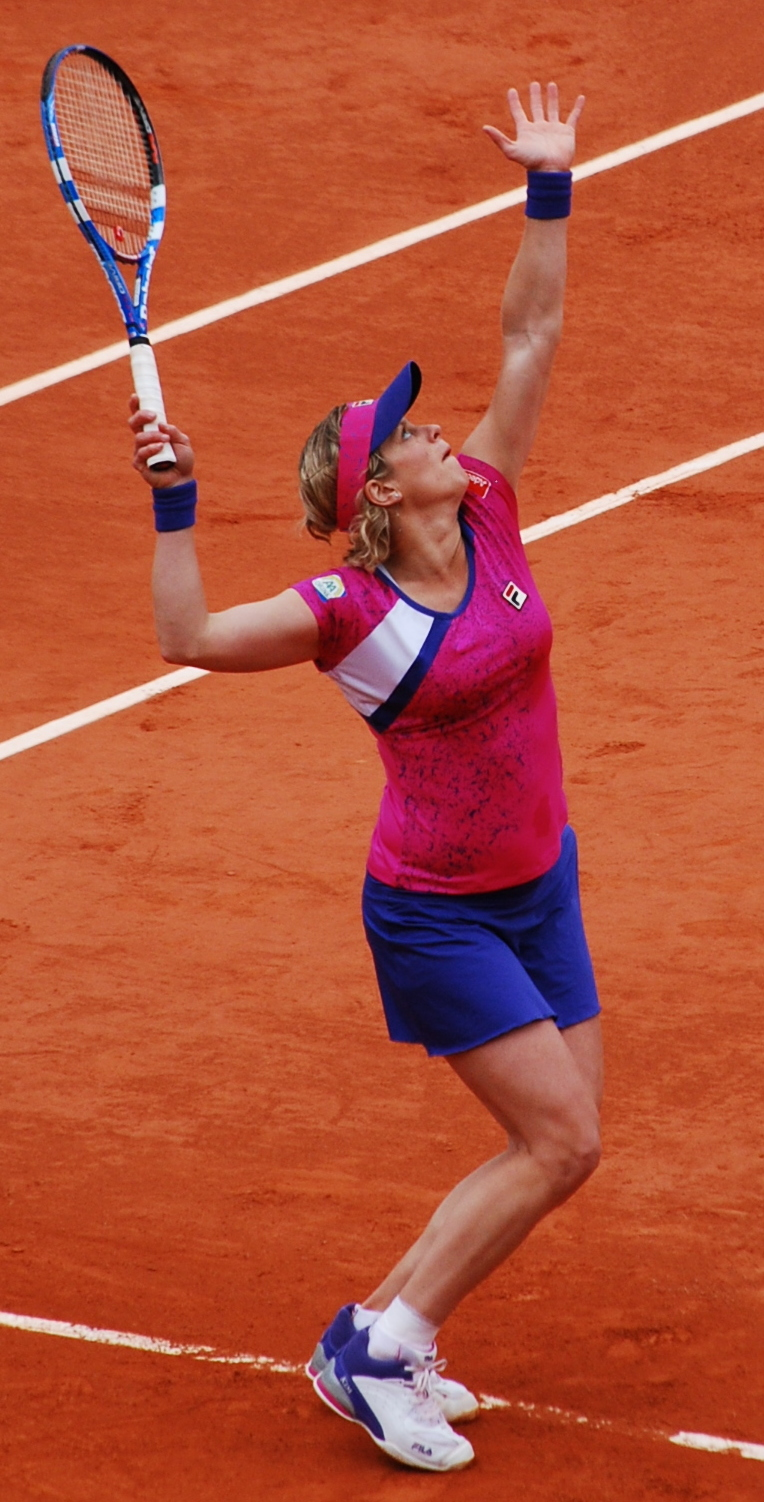
Clijsters serving

Clijsters is an all-court player who employed a mixture of offensive and defensive styles of play. On the defensive side, her movement is regarded as exceptional, enabling her to endure long rallies. Maria Sharapova has commented that, "You just have to expect that she's going to get every ball back." In addition to her movement, Clijsters often extends points with her signature shot, a stretched-out wide forehand, also known as a squash shot. This type of forehand involves hitting the ball with slice to make up for being out of position. When hitting a squash shot on the run, Clijsters is known for her trademark play of sliding towards the ball and finishing in a split to extend her reach. While most players can only slide on clay, Clijsters can slide on any surface. Tennis journalist Peter Bodo has noted, "Grass and hard courts do not 'permit' sliding unless your name is Kim Clijsters."

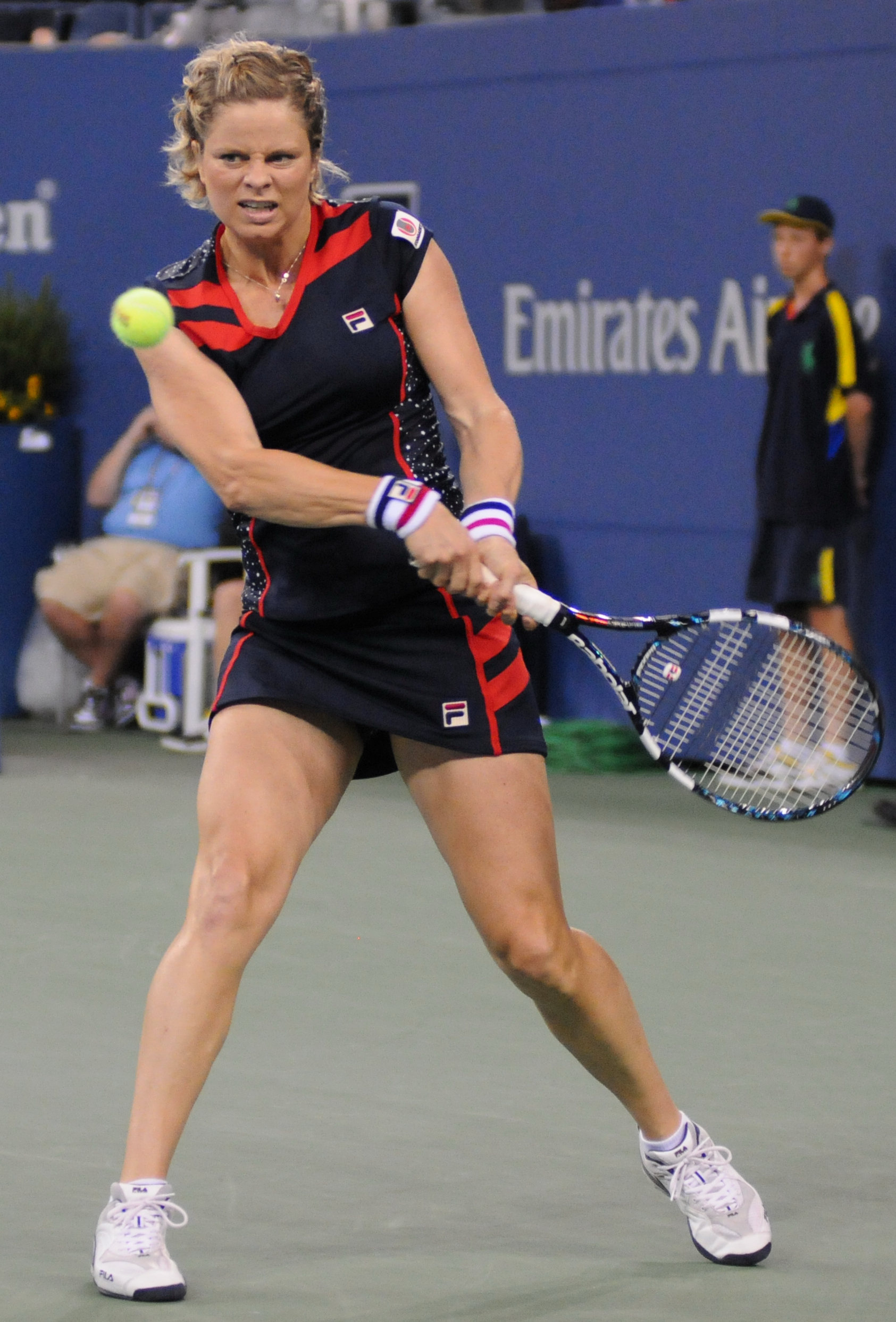
Clijsters hitting a backhand

The strengths of Clijsters's game are built around playing aggressively to generate offense without losing control. She excels at hitting both forehand and backhand winners from the baseline. Clijsters is regarded as one of the best returners of serve and tries to "take control of the point immediately... to [put herself] in an offensive position from the beginning". She was aggressive in the middle of points as well. While the squash shot is generally regarded as a defensive shot, Clijsters can turn it into an offensive weapon by placing it well enough to have time to recover into a good court position. Additionally, she possesses the ability to quickly move in from the baseline to the net, setting herself up to hit winners and finish points. She is adept at hitting swinging volleys on both the forehand and backhand sides because of her solid groundstroke technique. Clijsters credits her experience in doubles for improving her net game in singles, saying "it made [her] focus on going to the net more" and helped her "know when to come to the net". Her coach Wim Fissette attributed her success at Grand Slam events after her comeback to being more aggressive than she was before her first retirement.

== Coaches ==
Clijsters worked with Belgian coaches throughout her career. Her first coach was Bart Van Kerckhoven, who she later invited to her championship match at the 2010 US Open. She began her professional career with Carl Maes as her coach. Maes was a student of Benny Vanhoudt who led the Saturday training sessions while Clijsters was also working with Vanhoudt in Diest. He moved to the Flemish Tennis Association Centre in Wilrijk when Clijsters was 13 years old and invited her to join him. In her first year in Wilrijk, she also worked with Marc De Hous. Maes coached Clijsters from 1996 to May 2002, during which she won the Fed Cup and finished as the runner-up at the 2001 French Open.

Shortly before the 2002 US Open, she hired De Hous as her new coach and continued to work with him through 2005. Under De Hous, Clijsters won two WTA Tour Championships and two Grand Slam doubles titles. They split a week after she won her first Grand Slam singles title at the 2005 US Open. It was reported that De Hous left because he was unhappy with only receiving a $7,500 bonus from her $2.2 million in US Open prize money; however, he denied this was his only financial compensation and attributed his departure to wanting to "take on new challenges" after all of their success in 2005. Clijsters opted to play without a coach from then until her first retirement.

When Clijsters began her comeback in 2009, she hired Wim Fissette to be her coach. Fissette, who is three years older, had trained with Clijsters under Vanhoudt when they were both juniors. He had also served as her hitting partner from 2005 until her first retirement. With Fissette as her coach, Clijsters won three more Grand Slam singles titles and regained the world No. 1 ranking. In June 2011, she rehired Maes as her coach, leading to Fissette's departure several months later. Clijsters worked with Maes until her second retirement.

In 2020, coinciding with her second comeback, Clijsters announced Fred Hemmes Jr. as her new coach.

== Endorsements ==
During her playing career, Clijsters was represented by Belgian company Golazo Sports. Babolat has sponsored her racquets since 1999, and she specifically has used the Pure Drive model. Fila has been Clijsters's clothing sponsor since 2002. She had previously worn Nike apparel, but was not under contract.

Clijsters is conscious about selecting which products to endorse, saying, "If it's not healthy for kids, for example, I'm not going to endorse a product. I don't want to give the wrong impression. We try to live a healthy lifestyle and if it doesn't match me as a person, I turn it down." She has turned down Nutella in addition to endorsements that involved her daughter. While on tour, she endorsed banana supplier Chiquita and United Soft Drinks, the producer of the AA sports drink. Additionally, she was a brand ambassador for nutrition company USANA as well as the Citizen Watch Signature Collection. She also had endorsement deals with Belgian telecommunications company Telenet, personnel services firm Adecco, and the travel services company Thomas Cook Group.

Since Clijsters's retirement, Van Lanschot banking helps sponsor the Kim Clijsters Academy.

== Personal life ==
Clijsters is married to Brian Lynch, an American basketball coach and former player. The two met while Lynch was a member of Euphony Bree, and initially bonded over both having pet bulldogs. They became a couple in 2005 and married in 2007. They have three children: a daughter Jada (born 2008), and two sons Jack (born 2013) and Blake (born 2016). The family splits their time living in Bree and New Jersey.

Clijsters's sister Elke, who is younger by a year and a half, was also a promising tennis player. Like Kim, Elke won two junior Grand Slam doubles titles. She was also the ITF World Junior Doubles Champion in 2002. On the professional tour, she achieved a top 400 ranking in singles and a top 250 ranking in doubles. Kim and Elke entered one doubles tournament together on the WTA Tour at the 2004 Diamond Games in Antwerp. They won their opening match against Selima Sfar and Caroline Vis before losing to the second-seeded team of Émilie Loit and Petra Mandula in the next round. Elke retired in 2004 at age 19 due to persistent back problems.

Early in her career, she was in a long-term relationship with Australian tennis player Lleyton Hewitt. They met at the 2000 Australian Open and were engaged before mutually ending their relationship in late 2004. The pair entered the mixed doubles event at Wimbledon in 2000, losing in the final. Their relationship earned Clijsters the nickname "Aussie Kim" and made her popular among Australian tennis fans even after they separated. When Clijsters won the 2011 Australian Open, she believed she earned her nickname, saying, "Now you can finally call me Aussie Kim".

Clijsters's childhood tennis idol was Steffi Graf. She cites her lone WTA Tour match against Graf at Wimbledon in 1999 as being very influential, saying, "It was unbelievable. All I wanted to do was watch her. I wanted to see how she tied her shoelaces, what her ponytail looked like, how she carried her bag. Even though I lost, the impact of that and the motivation it gave me was huge. It was definitely the biggest moment of my career". She also looked up to Monica Seles and viewed both Graf and Seles as role models, drawing inspiration from their level of focus.

Clijsters is involved with multiple organizations that help children. She has served as an ambassador for SOS Children's Villages since 2010. Clijsters founded Ten4Kim, a nonprofit that funds junior tennis players who cannot afford the costs associated with training at a high level.

While Clijsters retired, she served as a part-time coach to several players, including Elise Mertens and Yanina Wickmayer. She also occasionally was a commentator at the Grand Slam tournaments, working for the BBC and Fox Sports Australia at Wimbledon and for Channel 7 at the Australian Open.

In 2022, Clijsters recorded public service announcements for the US Open for MTANew York City Transit.

== Career statistics ==
=== Grand Slam performance timelines ===
Key
W	F	SF	QF	#R	RR	Q#	DNQ	A	NH

(W) winner; (F) finalist; (SF) semifinalist; (QF) quarterfinalist; (#R) rounds 4, 3, 2, 1; (RR) round-robin stage; (Q#) qualification round; (DNQ) did not qualify; (A) absent; (NH) not held; (SR) strike rate (events won / competed); (W–L) win–loss record.

==== Singles ====
Tournament	1999	2000	2001	2002	2003	2004	2005	2006	2007	2008	2009	2010	2011	2012	/	2020	2021	SR	W–L	Win %
Australian Open	A	1R	4R	SF	SF	F	A	SF	SF	A	A	3R	W	SF		A	A	1 / 10	43–9	83%
French Open	A	1R	F	3R	F	A	4R	SF	A	A	A	A	2R	A		A	A	0 / 7	23–7	77%
Wimbledon	4R	2R	QF	2R	SF	A	4R	SF	A	A	A	QF	A	4R		NH	A	0 / 9	28–9	76%
US Open	3R	2R	QF	4R	F	A	W	A	A	A	W	W	A	2R		1R	A	3 / 10	38–7	84%
Win–loss	5–2	2–4	17–4	11–4	22–4	6–1	13–2	14–3	5–1	0–0	7–0	13–2	8–1	9–3		0–1	0–0	4 / 36	132–32	80%

==== Doubles ====
Tournament	2000	2001	2002	2003	2004–11	2012	SR	W–L	Win %
Australian Open	1R	3R	3R	QF	A	A	0 / 4	7–4	64%
French Open	1R	3R	A	W	A	A	1 / 3	8–2	80%
Wimbledon	2R	F	A	W	A	A	1 / 3	12–2	86%
US Open	3R	A	QF	2R	A	1R	0 / 4	6–4	60%
Win–loss	3–4	9–3	5–2	16–2	0–0	0–1	2 / 14	33–12	73%

=== Grand Slam tournament finals ===
==== Singles: 8 (4 titles, 4 runner-ups) ====
Result	Year	Championship	Surface	Opponent	Score
Loss	2001	French Open	Clay	(United States) Jennifer Capriati	6–1, 4–6, 10–12
Loss	2003	French Open	Clay	(Belgium) Justine Henin	0–6, 4–6
Loss	2003	US Open	Hard	(Belgium) Justine Henin	5–7, 1–6
Loss	2004	Australian Open	Hard	(Belgium) Justine Henin	3–6, 6–4, 3–6
Win	2005	US Open	Hard	(France) Mary Pierce	6–3, 6–1
Win	2009	US Open (2)	Hard	(Denmark) Caroline Wozniacki	7–5, 6–3
Win	2010	US Open (3)	Hard	(Russia) Vera Zvonareva	6–2, 6–1
Win	2011	Australian Open	Hard	(China) Li Na	3–6, 6–3, 6–3

==== Doubles: 3 (2 titles, 1 runner-up) ====
Result	Year	Championship	Surface	Partner	Opponents	Score
Loss	2001	Wimbledon	Grass	(Japan) Ai Sugiyama	(United States) Lisa Raymond (Australia) Rennae Stubbs	4–6, 3–6
Win	2003	French Open	Clay	(Japan) Ai Sugiyama	(Spain) Virginia Ruano Pascual (Argentina) Paola Suárez	6–7^{(5–7)}, 6–2, 9–7
Win	2003	Wimbledon	Grass	(Japan) Ai Sugiyama	(Spain) Virginia Ruano Pascual (Argentina) Paola Suárez	6–4, 6–4

==== Mixed doubles: 1 (1 runner-up) ====
Result	Year	Tournament	Surface	Partner	Opponents	Score
Loss	2000	Wimbledon	Grass	(Australia) Lleyton Hewitt	(United States) Kimberly Po (United States) Donald Johnson	4–6, 6–7^{(3–7)}

Sources: ITF profile and WTA profile

== Awards ==
ITF awards

- World Champion: 2005

WTA awards

- Newcomer of the Year: 1999
- Karen Krantzcke Sportsmanship Award: 2000, 2001, 2002, 2003, 2005, 2006, 2009, 2012
- Peachy Kellmeyer Player Service Award: 2003, 2006, 2010
- Comeback Player of the Year: 2005, 2009
- Player of the Year: 2005, 2010
- Humanitarian of the Year: 2006

National awards

- Belgian Promising Youngster of the Year (Beloftevolle Jongere van het Jaar): 1998
- Belgian Sportswoman of the Year: 1999, 2000, 2001, 2002, 2005, 2009, 2010, 2011
- Vlaamse Reus: 2000, 2001, 2010
- Flemish Sportsjewel (Vlaams Sportjuweel): 2001
- Belgian National Sports Merit Award: 2001 (with Henin)
- Belgian Sports Personality of the Year: 2003
- Grand Cross of the Order of the Crown, by Royal Decree of King Albert II (Grootkruis in de Kroonorde): 2003 (with Henin)
- Belgian Sporting Team of the Year: 2006 (with Fed Cup team members Butkiewicz, Flipkens, Henin, and Caroline Maes)

International awards

- Laureus World Sports Award for Comeback of the Year: 2010
- International Tennis Hall of Fame inductee: 2017

== See also ==
- List of Grand Slam women's singles champions
- List of Grand Slam women's doubles champions

Sporting positions
Preceded by Serena Williams; Justine Henin; Lindsay Davenport; Caroline Wozniacki	World No. 1; 11 August 2003 – 19 October 2003; 27 October 2003 – 9 November 2003; 30 January 2006 – 19 March 2006; 14 February 2011 – 20 February 2011	Succeeded by Justine Henin; Justine Henin; Amélie Mauresmo; Caroline Wozniacki
Awards and achievements
Preceded by Serena Williams	WTA Newcomer of the Year; 1999	Succeeded by Dája Bedáňová
Preceded by Ai Sugiyama; Lindsay Davenport; Petra Kvitová	Karen Krantczke Sportsmanship Award; 2000, 2001, 2002, 2003; 2005, 2006; 2012	Succeeded by Lindsay Davenport; Ana Ivanovic; Petra Kvitová
Preceded by Nicole Pratt; Liezel Huber; Liezel Huber	WTA Player Service; 2003; 2006; 2010	Succeeded by Nicole Pratt; Liezel Huber; Francesca Schiavone
Preceded by Marc Herremans	Belgian Sports Personality of the Year; 2003	Succeeded by Kim Gevaert
Preceded by Maria Sharapova; Serena Williams	WTA Player of the Year; 2005; 2010	Succeeded by Amélie Mauresmo; Petra Kvitová
Preceded by Serena Williams; Zheng Jie	WTA Comeback Player of the Year; 2005; 2009	Succeeded by Martina Hingis; Justine Henin
Preceded by Anastasia Myskina	ITF World Champion; 2005	Succeeded by Justine Henin
Preceded by Lindsay Davenport	US Open Series Winner; 2005	Succeeded by Ana Ivanovic
Preceded by Vitali Klitschko	Laureus World Sports Award for Comeback of the Year; 2010	Succeeded by Valentino Rossi
