= Diamond Games =

Women's tennis competition

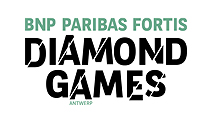

Defunct tennis tournament
- Founded: 2002
- Abolished: 2015
- Location: Antwerp; Belgium
- Venue: Sportpaleis Merksem
- Category: Tier II (2002–2009); WTA Premier (2015)
- Surface: Hard (indoors)
- Draw: 28S / 16D
- Prize money: $731,000
- Website: Sport.be

The Diamond Games (due to sponsorship known for the last time as BNP Paribas Fortis Diamond Games and before that Proximus Diamond Games, GDF-Suez Diamond Games and Thomas Cook Diamond Games) was a professional women's tennis tournament organised in Antwerp, Belgium. The tournament took place in the Sportpaleis, at the beginning of February.

In 2009, with the restructuring of the WTA Tour and the retirement of both Kim Clijsters and Justine Henin, the tournament lost its status of being a WTA Tour tournament and evolved into an annual exhibition tennis event before returning to the WTA calendar in 2015. Later that year, however, the WTA announced that in 2016, the Diamond Games would be replaced on the WTA calendar with a new tournament in St. Petersburg, Russia.

The Diamond Games offered a trophy to any player who won the singles three times in five years. In 2007, Amélie Mauresmo won a golden racquet decorated with diamonds. A new trophy was unveiled in 2008, which featured a golden racquet and a ball, and was decorated with 2008 diamonds.

== Past finals ==
=== Singles ===
Year	Champions	Runners-up	Score
↓ Tier II tournament ↓
2002	(United States) Venus Williams	(Belgium) Justine Henin	6–3, 5–7, 6–3.
2003	(United States) Venus Williams (2)	(Belgium) Kim Clijsters	6–2, 6–4
2004	(Belgium) Kim Clijsters	(Italy) Silvia Farina Elia	6–3, 6–0
2005	(France) Amélie Mauresmo	(United States) Venus Williams	4–6, 7–5, 6–4
2006	(France) Amélie Mauresmo (2)	(Belgium) Kim Clijsters	3–6, 6–3, 6–3
2007	(France) Amélie Mauresmo (3)	(Belgium) Kim Clijsters	6–4, 7–6^{(7–4)}
2008	(Belgium) Justine Henin	(Italy) Karin Knapp	6–3, 6–3
2009–14	Only exhibition tournaments held		
↓ Premier tournament ↓
2015	(Germany) Andrea Petkovic	(Spain) Carla Suárez Navarro	Walkover

=== Doubles ===
Year	Champions	Runners-up	Score
↓ Tier II tournament ↓
2002	(Bulgaria) Magdalena Maleeva (Switzerland) Patty Schnyder	(France) Nathalie Dechy (United States) Meilen Tu	6–3, 6–7^{(3–7)}, 6–3
2003	(Belgium) Kim Clijsters (Japan) Ai Sugiyama	(France) Nathalie Dechy (France) Émilie Loit	6–2, 6–0
2004	(Zimbabwe) Cara Black (Belgium) Els Callens	(Switzerland) Myriam Casanova (Greece) Eleni Daniilidou	6–2, 6–1
2005	(Zimbabwe) Cara Black (2) (Belgium) Els Callens (2)	(Spain) Anabel Medina (Russia) Dinara Safina	3–6, 6–4, 6–4
2006	(Russia) Dinara Safina (Slovenia) Katarina Srebotnik	(France) Stéphanie Foretz (Netherlands) Michaëlla Krajicek	6–1, 6–1
2007	(Zimbabwe) Cara Black (3) (South Africa) Liezel Huber	(Russia) Elena Likhovtseva (Russia) Elena Vesnina	7–5, 4–6, 6–1
2008	(Zimbabwe) Cara Black (4) (United States) Liezel Huber (2)	(Czech Republic) Květa Peschke (Japan) Ai Sugiyama	6–1, 6–3
2009–14	Only exhibition tournaments held		
↓ Premier tournament ↓
2015	(Spain) Anabel Medina Garrigues (Spain) Arantxa Parra Santonja	(Belgium) An-Sophie Mestach (Belgium) Alison Van Uytvanck	6–4, 3–6, [10–5]

== See also ==
- Belgian Open – women's tournament (1987–2002)
- Brussels Open – women's tournament (2011–2013)
