= WTA Tier V tournaments =

Tennis tournament category 1988–2008

The WTA Tier V tournaments were the fifth, and lowest, level of women's tennis tournaments on the WTA Tour between 1990 and 1992 and from 2001 to 2005. The line-up of events varied over the years, with tournaments being promoted, demoted or cancelled. Most of the Tier V tournaments became Tier IV events between 1993 and 2000 and from 2006 to 2008.

In 2009, WTA changed the tournament categories, so that most of the Tier III, Tier IV and Tier V tournaments from 2008 were placed in a single, WTA International tournaments, category.

== Number of tournaments ==
Year	No.
1990	12
1991	14
1992	14
2001	8
2002	7
2003	6
2004	8
2005	2

== Events ==
Tournament	Location(s)	Country	Surface	Tier V in	Years
Athens Trophy	Athens	Greece	Clay	1990	1
Auckland Open	Auckland	New Zealand	Hard	1990–1992, 2001	4
WTA Austrian Open	Kitzbühel	Austria	Clay	1990	1
Swedish Open	Båstad	Sweden	Hard	1990	1
WTA Bayonne	Bayonne	France	Carpet (i)	1990	1
Estoril Open	Estoril	Portugal	Clay	1990–1991	2
Moscow Ladies Open	Moscow / St. Petersburg	Russia	Carpet (i)	1990–1991	2
WTA Palermo	Palermo	Italy	Clay	1990–1992, 2001–2004	7
WTA Schenectady	Schenectady	United States	Hard	1990–1992	3
WTA Taranto	Taranto	Italy	Clay	1990–1992	3
Croatian Open	Bol	Croatia	Clay	1991	1
Oslo Open	Oslo	Norway	Carpet (i)	1991	1
Pattaya Open	Pattaya	Thailand	Clay	1991–1992, 2001–2003	5
San Marino International	City of San Marino	San Marino	Clay	1992	1
Taiwan Open	Taipei	Taiwan	Carpet (i)	1992	1
Belgian Open	Waregem / Antwerp	Belgium	Clay	1992, 2001	2
WTA Bratislava	Bratislava	Slovakia	Hard (i)	2001–2002	2
Hungarian Ladies Open	Budapest	Hungary	Clay	2001–2004	4
Morocco Open	Casablanca	Morocco	Clay	2001–2004	4
Hobart International	Hobart	Australia	Hard	2001–2005	5
Canberra International	Canberra	Australia	Hard	2002–2005	4
WTA Forest Hills	New York City	United States	Hard	2004	1
Vancouver Open	Vancouver	Canada	Hard	2004	1

== Past finals ==
=== 1990 ===
The 1990 WTA Tour consisted of 59 tournaments of which 12 were categorized as Tier V. These were tournaments approved by the WIPTC with prize money of $75,000.

Tournament	Winner	Runner-up	Score
Guarujá (Note: Tournament was part of the 1990 WTA Tour but was held in December 1989.)	(Argentina) Federica Haumüller	(Argentina) Patricia Tarabini	7–6^{(9–7)}, 6–4
Auckland	(Soviet Union) Leila Meskhi	(Belgium) Sabine Appelmans	6–1, 6–0
Wellington	(Germany) Wiltrud Probst	(Soviet Union) Leila Meskhi	1–6, 6–4, 6–0
Taranto	(Italy) Raffaella Reggi	(France) Alexia Dechaume	5–7, 6–0, 6–1
Båstad	(Italy) Sandra Cecchini	(Switzerland) Csilla Bartos	6–1, 6–2
Palermo	(Germany) Isabel Cueto	(Austria) Barbara Paulus	6–2, 6–3
Estoril	(Italy) Federica Bonsignori	(Italy) Laura Garrone	2–6, 6–3, 6–3
Schenectady	(Germany) Anke Huber	(United States) Marianne Werdel	6–1, 5–7, 6–4
Kitzbühel	(Germany) Claudia Kohde-Kilsch	(Australia) Rachel McQuillan	7–6^{(7–5)}, 6–4
Athens	(Sweden) Cecilia Dahlman	(Italy) Katia Piccolini	7–5, 7–5
Bayonne	(France) Nathalie Tauziat	(Germany) Anke Huber	6–3, 7–6^{(10–8)}
Moscow	(Soviet Union) Leila Meskhi	(Soviet Union) Elena Brioukhovets	6–4, 6–4

=== 1991 ===
The 1991 WTA Tour consisted of 60 tournaments of which 14 were categorized as Tier V. These were tournaments approved by the WIPTC with prize money of $75,000 or $100,000.

Tournament	Winner	Runner-up	Score
São Paulo (Note: Tournament was part of the 1991 WTA Tour but was held in November 1990.)	(Germany) Veronika Martinek	(United States) Donna Faber	6–2, 6–4
Auckland	(Czechoslovakia) Eva Švíglerová	(Czechoslovakia) Andrea Strnadová	6–2, 0–6, 6–1
Wellington	(Soviet Union) Leila Meskhi	(Czechoslovakia) Andrea Strnadová	3–6, 7–6^{(7–3)}, 6–2
Oslo	(Sweden) Catarina Lindqvist	(Italy) Raffaella Reggi	6–3, 6–0
Linz	(Switzerland) Manuela Maleeva-Fragnière	(Czechoslovakia) Petra Langrová	7–5, 6–3
Aurora	(United States) Lori McNeil	(Netherlands) Manon Bollegraf	6–3, 6–4
Pattaya City	(Indonesia) Yayuk Basuki	(Japan) Naoko Sawamatsu	6–2, 6–2
Bol	(Italy) Sandra Cecchini	(Bulgaria) Magdalena Maleeva	6–4, 3–6, 7–5
Taranto	(Switzerland) Emanuela Zardo	(Austria) Petra Ritter	7–5, 6–2
Palermo	(France) Mary Pierce	(Italy) Sandra Cecchini	6–0, 6–3
Bayonne	(France) Nathalie Tauziat	(Germany) Anke Huber	6–3, 7–6^{(10–8)}
San Marino	(Italy) Katia Piccolini	(Italy) Silvia Farina	6–2, 6–3
Schenectady	(Netherlands) Brenda Schultz	(France) Alexia Dechaume	7–6^{(7–5)}, 6–2
St. Petersburg	(Soviet Union) Larisa Neiland	(Germany) Barbara Rittner	3–6, 6–3, 6–4

=== 1992 ===
The 1992 WTA Tour consisted of 57 tournaments of which 14 were categorized as Tier V. These were tournaments approved by the WIPTC with prize money of $100,000.

Tournament	Winner	Runner-up	Score
São Paulo (Note: Tournament was part of the 1992 WTA Tour but was held in December 1991.)	(Germany) Sabine Hack	(Germany) Veronika Martinek	6–3, 7–5
Auckland	(United States) Robin White	(Czechoslovakia) Andrea Strnadová	2–6, 6–4, 6–3
Wellington	(France) Noëlle van Lottum	(United States) Donna Faber	6–4, 6–0
Linz	(Ukraine) Natalia Medvedeva	(France) Pascale Paradis	6–4, 6–2
Cesena	(France) Mary Pierce	(France) Catherine Tanvier	6–1, 6–1
Pattaya City	(Belgium) Sabine Appelmans	(Czechoslovakia) Andrea Strnadová	7–5, 3–6, 7–5
Kuala Lumpur	(Indonesia) Yayuk Basuki	(Czechoslovakia) Andrea Strnadová	6–3, 6–0
Taranto	(France) Julie Halard	(Switzerland) Emanuela Zardo	6–0, 7–5
Waregem	(Germany) Wiltrud Probst	(Germany) Meike Babel	6–2, 6–3
Palermo	(France) Mary Pierce	(Netherlands) Brenda Schultz	6–0, 6–3
San Marino	(Bulgaria) Magdalena Maleeva	(Italy) Federica Bonsignori	7–6^{(7–3)}, 6–4
Prague	(Czechoslovakia) Radka Zrubáková	(Czechoslovakia) Kateřina Kroupová	6–3, 7–5
Schenectady	(Germany) Barbara Rittner	(Netherlands) Brenda Schultz	7–6^{(7–3)}, 6–3
Taipei	(United States) Shaun Stafford	(United States) Ann Grossman	6–1, 6–3

=== 2001 ===
The 2001 WTA Tour consisted of 63 tournaments of which 8 were categorized as Tier V. These were tournaments approved by the WTA Tour with a minimum prize money of $110,000.

Tournament	Winner	Runner-up	Score
Auckland	(United States) Meilen Tu	(Argentina) Paola Suárez	7–6^{(12–10)}, 6–2
Hobart	(Italy) Rita Grande	(United States) Jennifer Hopkins	0–6, 6–3, 6–3
Budapest	(Bulgaria) Magdalena Maleeva	(Luxembourg) Anne Kremer	3–6, 6–2, 6–4
Antwerp	(Germany) Barbara Rittner	(Czechoslovakia) Klára Koukalová	6–3, 6–2
Palermo	(Spain) Anabel Medina Garrigues	(Spain) Cristina Torrens Valero	6–4, 6–4
Casablanca	(Hungary) Zsófia Gubacsi	(Italy) Maria Elena Camerin	1–6, 6–3, 7–6^{(7–5)}
Bratislava	(Italy) Rita Grande	(Slovakia) Martina Suchá	6–1, 6–1
Pattaya City	(Switzerland) Patty Schnyder	(Slovakia) Henrieta Nagyová	6–0, 6–4

=== 2002 ===
The 2002 WTA Tour consisted of 64 tournaments of which 7 were categorized as Tier V. These were tournaments approved by the WTA Tour with a minimum prize money of $110,000.

Tournament	Winner	Runner-up	Score
Hobart	(Slovakia) Martina Suchá	(Spain) Anabel Medina Garrigues	7–6^{(9–7)}, 6–1
Canberra	(Israel) Anna Smashnova	(Thailand) Tamarine Tanasugarn	0–6, 6–3, 6–3^{(7–2)}
Budapest	(Germany) Martina Müller	(Switzerland) Myriam Casanova	6–2, 3–6, 6–4
Casablanca	(Austria) Patricia Wartusch	(Czechoslovakia) Klára Koukalová	5–7, 6–3, 6–3
Palermo	(Argentina) Mariana Díaz Oliva	(Russia) Vera Zvonareva	6–7^{(6–8)}, 6–1, 6–3
Bratislava	(Slovenia) Maja Matevžič	(Czechoslovakia) Iveta Benešová	6–0, 6–1
Pattaya City	(Indonesia) Angelique Widjaja	(South Korea) Cho Yoon-jeong	6–2, 6–4

=== 2003 ===
The 2003 WTA Tour consisted of 59 tournaments of which 6 were categorized as Tier V. These were tournaments approved by the WTA Tour with a minimum prize money of $110,000.

Tournament	Winner	Runner-up	Score
Hobart	(Australia) Alicia Molik	(United States) Amy Frazier	6–2, 4–6, 6–4
Canberra	(United States) Meghann Shaughnessy	(Italy) Francesca Schiavone	6–1, 6–1
Casablanca	(Italy) Rita Grande	(Italy) Antonella Serra Zanetti	6–2, 4–6, 6–1
Budapest	(Spain) Magüi Serna	(Australia) Alicia Molik	3–6, 7–5, 6–4
Palermo	(Russia) Dinara Safina	(Slovenia) Katarina Srebotnik	6–3, 6–4
Pattaya City	(Slovakia) Henrieta Nagyová	(Slovakia) Ľubomíra Kurhajcová	6–4, 6–2

=== 2004 ===
The 2004 WTA Tour consisted of 60 tournaments of which 8 were categorized as Tier V. These were tournaments approved by the WTA Tour with a minimum prize money of $110,000.

Tournament	Winner	Runner-up	Score
Hobart	(United States) Amy Frazier	(Japan) Shinobu Asagoe	6–3, 6–3
Canberra	(Argentina) Paola Suárez	(Italy) Silvia Farina Elia	3–6, 6–4, 7–6^{(7–5)}
Casablanca	(France) Émilie Loit	(Slovakia) Ľudmila Cervanová	6–2, 6–2
Estoril	(France) Émilie Loit	(Slovakia) Iveta Benešová	7–5, 7–6^{(7–1)}
Budapest	(Federal Republic of Yugoslavia) Jelena Janković	(Slovakia) Martina Suchá	7–6^{(7–4)}, 6–3
Palermo	(Spain) Anabel Medina Garrigues	(Italy) Flavia Pennetta	6–4, 6–4
Vancouver	(Czechoslovakia) Nicole Vaidišová	(United States) Laura Granville	2–6, 6–4, 6–2
Forest Hills	(Russia) Elena Likhovtseva	(Czechoslovakia) Iveta Benešová	6–2, 6–2

=== 2005 ===
The 2005 WTA Tour consisted of 63 tournaments of which 2 were categorized as Tier V. These were tournaments approved by the WTA Tour with a minimum prize money of $110,000.

Tournament	Winner	Runner-up	Score
Hobart	(China) Zheng Jie	(Argentina) Gisela Dulko	6–2, 6–0
Canberra	(Serbia and Montenegro) Ana Ivanovic	(Hungary) Melinda Czink	7–5, 6–1
