= 2002 Budapest Grand Prix – Singles =

Singles
- 2002 Budapest Grand Prix

Final
- Champion: (Germany) Martina Müller
- Runner-up: (Switzerland) Myriam Casanova
- Score: 6–2, 3–6, 6–4

Details
- Draw: 32 (2WC/4Q/2LL)
- Seeds: 8

Events
Singles	Doubles
← 2001 ·	Budapest Grand Prix	· 2003 →

Magdalena Maleeva was the defending champion, but did not compete this year.

Martina Müller won the title by defeating Myriam Casanova 6–2, 3–6, 6–4 in the final.

This was the last professional tournament for Miroslava Vavrinec (Roger Federer's wife) until retiring at the same year due to injuries. Vavrinec competed at the qualifying rounds, losing in the first round to Magdalena Zděnovcová in straight sets.

== Seeds ==
1. (Slovakia) Martina Suchá (quarterfinals)
2. (Hungary) Petra Mandula (first round)
3. (Zimbabwe) Cara Black (quarterfinals)
4. (Greece) Eleni Daniilidou (semifinals)
5. (Slovenia) Maja Matevžič (first round)
6. (Belarus) Tatiana Poutchek (semifinals)
7. (Russia) Elena Bovina (first round)
8. (Austria) Barbara Schwartz (first round)

== Draw ==
=== Key ===
- Q = Qualifier
- WC = Wild card
- LL = Lucky loser
- Alt = Alternate
- SE = Special exempt
- PR = Protected ranking
- ITF = ITF entry
- JE = Junior exempt
- w/o = Walkover
- r = Retired
- d = Defaulted
- SR = Special ranking

=== Finals ===
Semifinals
(Germany) Martina Müller	6	6
6	(Belarus) Tatiana Poutchek	2	1
4	(Greece) Eleni Daniilidou	4	6	5
Q	(Switzerland) Myriam Casanova	6	2	7

Final
(Germany) Martina Müller	6	3	6
Q	(Switzerland) Myriam Casanova	2	6	4

=== Top half ===
First round
1	(Slovakia) M Suchá	3	6	6
Q	(Czech Republic) I Benešová	6	3	4
(Croatia) S Talaja	3	4
LL	(Russia) S Kuznetsova	6	6
(Hungary) A Kapros	1	3
(France) C Beigbeder	6	6
(Germany) M Müller	3	6	7
5	(Slovenia) M Matevžič	6	3	5
3	(Zimbabwe) C Black	6	3	6
Q	(Slovakia) E Fislová	3	6	3
(Netherlands) S Noorlander	6	5	4
WC	(Hungary) K Marosi-Aracama	2	7	6
WC	(Hungary) V Németh	6^{1}	6	3
(France) É Loit	7^{7}	4	6
(Italy) ME Camerin	2	3
6	(Belarus) T Poutchek	6	6

Second round
1	(Slovakia) M Suchá	6	6
LL	(Russia) S Kuznetsova	1	2
(France) C Beigbeder	6	6^{4}	0
(Germany) M Müller	4	7^{7}	6
3	(Zimbabwe) C Black	6	6
WC	(Hungary) K Marosi-Aracama	3	3
(France) É Loit	2	6	3
6	(Belarus) T Poutchek	6	2	6

Quarterfinals
1	(Slovakia) M Suchá	3	7^{7}	3
(Germany) M Müller	6	6^{3}	6
3	(Zimbabwe) C Black	6	6^{7}	4
6	(Belarus) T Poutchek	3	7^{9}	6

Semifinals
(Germany) M Müller	6	6
6	(Belarus) T Poutchek	2	1

=== Bottom half ===
First round
8	(Austria) B Schwartz	6	1	2
(Germany) J Kandarr	4	6	6
(Hungary) R Kuti-Kis	6	2	6
(Spain) E Bes	4	6	1
(Hungary) Z Gubacsi	7	4	6
(Spain) MJ Martínez Sánchez	5	6	2
(Slovakia) Ľ Cervanová	3	4
4	(Greece) E Daniilidou	6	6
7	(Russia) E Bovina	6^{1}	4
(Bulgaria) L Bacheva	7^{7}	6
Q	(Israel) T Obziler	6	6
(Netherlands) M Oremans	3	3
(Croatia) J Kostanić	3	4
Q	(Switzerland) M Casanova	6	6
LL	(Slovakia) Ľ Kurhajcová	6	6
2	(Hungary) P Mandula	2	3

Second round
(Germany) J Kandarr	0	5
(Hungary) R Kuti-Kis	6	7
(Hungary) Z Gubacsi	4	5
4	(Greece) E Daniilidou	6	7
(Bulgaria) L Bacheva	3	6	6
Q	(Israel) T Obziler	6	4	0
Q	(Switzerland) M Casanova	3	6	6
LL	(Slovakia) Ľ Kurhajcová	6	2	4

Quarterfinals
(Hungary) R Kuti-Kis	2	2
4	(Greece) E Daniilidou	6	6
(Bulgaria) L Bacheva	6	1	1
Q	(Switzerland) M Casanova	3	6	6

Semifinals
4	(Greece) E Daniilidou	4	6	5
Q	(Switzerland) M Casanova	6	2	7

== Qualifying ==
=== Qualifying seeds ===
1. (Czech Republic) Klára Koukalová (second round)
2. (Belgium) Els Callens (first round)
3. (Spain) Nuria Llagostera Vives (first round)
4. (Germany) Angelika Rösch (second round)
5. (Czech Republic) Alena Vašková (second round)
6. (Germany) Miriam Schnitzer (first round)
7. (Italy) Valentina Sassi (first round)
8. (Czech Republic) Lenka Němečková (first round)

=== Qualifiers ===
1. (Israel) Tzipora Obziler
2. (Switzerland) Myriam Casanova
3. (Slovakia) Eva Fislová
4. (Czech Republic) Iveta Benešová

=== Lucky losers ===
1. (Russia) Svetlana Kuznetsova
2. (Slovakia) Ľubomíra Kurhajcová

=== Qualifying draw ===
==== First qualifier ====
First round
1	(Czech Republic) Klára Koukalová	6	7
(Russia) Galina Fokina	3	5
(Czech Republic) Magdalena Zděnovcová	6	6
(Switzerland) Miroslava Vavrinec	4	3
WC	(Hungary) Zsofia Szabo	0	0
WC	(Hungary) Anna Földényi	6	6
(Israel) Tzipora Obziler	3	7	6
6	(Germany) Miriam Schnitzer	6	5	4

Second round
1	(Czech Republic) Klára Koukalová	4	3
(Czech Republic) Magdalena Zděnovcová	6	6
WC	(Hungary) Anna Földényi	0	3
(Israel) Tzipora Obziler	6	6

Qualifying competition
(Czech Republic) Magdalena Zděnovcová	1	6	2
(Israel) Tzipora Obziler	6	4	6

==== Second qualifier ====
First round
2	(Belgium) Els Callens	4	3
(Russia) Svetlana Kuznetsova	6	6
(Czech Republic) Eva Martincová	7^{7}	6
(Germany) Adriana Barna	6^{5}	3
(Hungary) Kira Nagy	6	6
(Belarus) Nadejda Ostrovskaya	4	1
WC	(Switzerland) Myriam Casanova	4	6	6
7	(Italy) Valentina Sassi	6	2	1

Second round
(Russia) Svetlana Kuznetsova	6	7
(Czech Republic) Eva Martincová	4	5
(Hungary) Kira Nagy	1	4
WC	(Switzerland) Myriam Casanova	6	6

Qualifying competition
(Russia) Svetlana Kuznetsova	4	5
WC	(Switzerland) Myriam Casanova	6	7

==== Third qualifier ====
First round
3	(Spain) Nuria Llagostera Vives	1	3
(Slovakia) Eva Fislová	6	6
(Luxembourg) Claudine Schaul	6	6
(Germany) Angelika Bachmann	2	3
(Czech Republic) Libuše Průšová	6	6
(Austria) Patricia Wartusch	4	4
(Hungary) Eszter Molnár	2	6^{4}
5	(Czech Republic) Alena Vašková	6	7^{7}

Second round
(Slovakia) Eva Fislová	7	7^{7}
(Luxembourg) Claudine Schaul	5	6^{4}
(Czech Republic) Libuše Průšová	4	6	6
5	(Czech Republic) Alena Vašková	6	3	0

Qualifying competition
(Slovakia) Eva Fislová	1	6	6
(Czech Republic) Libuše Průšová	6	4	4

==== Fourth qualifier ====
First round
4	(Germany) Angelika Rösch	7	3	6
(Estonia) Maret Ani	5	6	2
(Czech Republic) Iveta Benešová	7^{7}	7^{7}
(Slovakia) Stanislava Hrozenská	6^{5}	6^{4}
(Czech Republic) Michaela Paštiková	6	1	4
WC	(Russia) Anna Chakvetadze	2	6	6
(Slovakia) Ľubomíra Kurhajcová	6	6
8	(Czech Republic) Lenka Němečková	3	3

Second round
4	(Germany) Angelika Rösch	7	3	5
(Czech Republic) Iveta Benešová	5	6	7
WC	(Russia) Anna Chakvetadze	2	1
(Slovakia) Ľubomíra Kurhajcová	6	6

Qualifying competition
(Czech Republic) Iveta Benešová	6	7
(Slovakia) Ľubomíra Kurhajcová	1	5
