= 2002 Budapest Grand Prix =

- Date: 15–21 April
- Edition: 7th
- Category: Tier V
- Draw: 32S / 16D
- Prize money: $110,000
- Surface: Clay / outdoor
- Location: Budapest, Hungary

Champions

Singles
- (Germany) Martina Müller

Doubles
- (Australia) Catherine Barclay / (France) Émilie Loit
← 2001 ·	Hungarian Ladies Open	· 2003 →

The 2002 Budapest Grand Prix was a women's tennis tournament played on outdoor clay courts in Budapest, Hungary that was part of the Tier V category of the 2002 WTA Tour. It was the seventh edition of the tournament and was held from 15 April until 21 April 2002. Unseeded Martina Müller won the singles title and earned $16,000 first-prize money.

== Finals ==
=== Singles ===
(Germany) Martina Müller defeated (Switzerland) Myriam Casanova 6–2, 3–6, 6–4

- It was Müller's only singles title of her career.

=== Doubles ===
(Australia) Catherine Barclay / (France) Émilie Loit defeated (Russia) Elena Bovina / (Hungary) Zsófia Gubacsi 4–6, 6–3, 6–3
