= 2002 Budapest Grand Prix – Doubles =

Doubles
- 2002 Budapest Grand Prix

Final
- Champions: (Australia) Catherine Barclay (France) Émilie Loit
- Runners-up: (Russia) Elena Bovina (Hungary) Zsófia Gubacsi
- Score: 4–6, 6–3, 6–3

Details
- Draw: 16 (1Q/1LL)
- Seeds: 4

Events
Singles	Doubles
← 2001 ·	Budapest Grand Prix	· 2003 →

Tathiana Garbin and Janette Husárová were the defending champions, but none competed this year. Husárová chose to compete at Charleston in the same week.

Catherine Barclay and Émilie Loit won the title by defeating Elena Bovina and Zsófia Gubacsi 4–6, 6–3, 6–3 in the final.

== Seeds ==
1. (Belgium) Els Callens / (Netherlands) Miriam Oremans (first round)
2. (Hungary) ~~Petra Mandula~~ / (Austria) ~~Patricia Wartusch~~ (withdrew)
3. (Hungary) Katalin Marosi-Aracama / (Belarus) Tatiana Poutchek (first round)
4. (Greece) Eleni Daniilidou / (South Africa) Kim Grant (quarterfinals)

== Draw ==
=== Key ===
- Q = Qualifier
- WC = Wild card
- LL = Lucky loser
- Alt = Alternate
- SE = Special exempt
- PR = Protected ranking
- ITF = ITF entry
- JE = Junior exempt
- w/o = Walkover
- r = Retired
- d = Defaulted
- SR = Special ranking

=== Draw ===
First round
1	(Belgium) E Callens (Netherlands) M Oremans	3	6	5
(Hungary) A Kapros (Hungary) K Nagy	6	3	7
(Russia) E Bovina (Hungary) Z Gubacsi	7	6
(Czech Republic) L Němečková (Austria) B Schwartz	5	0
4	(Greece) E Daniilidou (South Africa) K Grant	6	6
Q	(Czech Republic) I Benešová (Slovakia) Ľ Kurhajcová	3	4
(Estonia) M Ani (Spain) MJ Martínez Sánchez	7^{7}	6
(Slovakia) E Fislová (Czech Republic) M Zděnovcová	6^{3}	3
(Germany) M Müller (New Zealand) S Stephens	6^{5}	3
(Czech Republic) E Martincová (Czech Republic) A Vašková	7^{7}	6
(Australia) C Barclay (France) É Loit	6	6
3	(Hungary) K Marosi-Aracama (Belarus) T Poutchek	1	4
(Russia) G Fokina (Russia) S Kuznetsova	6	3	6
(Germany) M Kučerová (Germany) C Schneider	3	6	3
(Bulgaria) L Bacheva (Germany) A Rösch	7	6
LL	(Croatia) J Kostanić (Croatia) S Talaja	5	0

Quarterfinals
(Hungary) A Kapros (Hungary) K Nagy	4	7^{7}	3
(Russia) E Bovina (Hungary) Z Gubacsi	6	6^{2}	6
4	(Greece) E Daniilidou (South Africa) K Grant	2	6^{6}
(Estonia) M Ani (Spain) MJ Martínez Sánchez	6	7^{8}
(Czech Republic) E Martincová (Czech Republic) A Vašková	4	6	2
(Australia) C Barclay (France) É Loit	6	4	6
(Russia) G Fokina (Russia) S Kuznetsova	5	6	5
(Bulgaria) L Bacheva (Germany) A Rösch	7	2	7

Semifinals
(Russia) E Bovina (Hungary) Z Gubacsi	6	6
(Estonia) M Ani (Spain) MJ Martínez Sánchez	4	4
(Australia) C Barclay (France) É Loit	6	6
(Bulgaria) L Bacheva (Germany) A Rösch	4	3

Final
(Russia) E Bovina (Hungary) Z Gubacsi	6	3	3
(Australia) C Barclay (France) É Loit	4	6	6

== Qualifying ==
=== Qualifying seeds ===
1. (Spain) Nuria Llagostera Vives / (Romania) Raluca Sandu (first round)
2. (Croatia) Jelena Kostanić / (Croatia) Silvija Talaja (qualifying competition, Lucky losers)

=== Qualifiers ===
1. (Czech Republic) Iveta Benešová / (Slovakia) Ľubomíra Kurhajcová

=== Lucky losers ===
1. (Croatia) Jelena Kostanić / (Croatia) Silvija Talaja

=== Qualifying draw ===
First round
1	(Spain) Nuria Llagostera Vives (Romania) Raluca Sandu	6
(Czech Republic) Iveta Benešová (Slovakia) Ľubomíra Kurhajcová	8
WC	(Hungary) Bibi Berecz (Hungary) Zsuzsanna Fodor	4
2	(Croatia) Jelena Kostanić (Croatia) Silvija Talaja	8

Qualifying competition
(Czech Republic) Iveta Benešová (Slovakia) Ľubomíra Kurhajcová	7^{10}	7^{7}
2	(Croatia) Jelena Kostanić (Croatia) Silvija Talaja	6^{8}	6^{2}
