= 2003 Grand Prix SAR La Princesse Lalla Meryem – Doubles =

Doubles
- 2003 Grand Prix SAR La Princesse Lalla Meryem

Final
- Champion: (Argentina) Gisela Dulko (Argentina) María Emilia Salerni
- Runner-up: (Slovakia) Henrieta Nagyová (Ukraine) Elena Tatarkova
- Score: 6–3, 6–4

Events
Singles	Doubles
← 2002 ·	Morocco Open	· 2004 →

Patricia Wartusch and Petra Mandula were the defending champions, but Mandula chose not to compete in 2003. Wartusch played with Rita Grande, but lost in the first round.

Gisela Dulko and María Emilia Salerni won the title.

== Seeds ==
1. (Italy) Rita Grande / (Austria) Patricia Wartusch (first round)
2. (Slovakia) Henrieta Nagyová / (Ukraine) Elena Tatarkova (final)
3. (Croatia) Jelena Kostanić / (Australia) Trudi Musgrave (first round)
4. (Spain) Marta Marrero / (Paraguay) Rossana de los Ríos (quarterfinals)

== Results ==
=== Key ===
- Q = Qualifier
- WC = Wild card
- LL = Lucky loser
- Alt = Alternate
- SE = Special exempt
- PR = Protected ranking
- ITF = ITF entry
- JE = Junior exempt
- w/o = Walkover
- r = Retired
- d = Defaulted
- SR = Special ranking

=== Draw ===
First round
1	(Italy) R Grande (Austria) P Wartusch	2	6	1
PR	(Romania) R Dragomir (Croatia) S Talaja	6	2	6
(Belarus) T Poutchek (Russia) An Rodionova	6	2	6
(France) A Fusai (Germany) M Müller	3	6	4
3	(Croatia) J Kostanić (Australia) T Musgrave	3	7	2
(Argentina) G Dulko (Argentina) ME Salerni	6	6^{11}	6
(Germany) K Freye (Germany) B Lamade	2	5
Q	(Czech Republic) I Benešová (Slovakia) Ľ Kurhajcová	6	7
(Italy) Ad Serra Zanetti (Italy) An Serra Zanetti	6	7
(Australia) C Barclay (South Africa) K Grant	2	6^{5}
(Bulgaria) L Bacheva (Romania) A Vanc	5	6	3
4	(Spain) M Marrero (Paraguay) R de los Ríos	7	2	6
(Spain) C Martínez Granados (Spain) MJ Martínez Sánchez	6^{2}	6	2
WC	(Spain) RM Andrés Rodríguez (Morocco) B Mouhtassine	7	4	6
(Hungary) Z Gubacsi (Hungary) K Marosi	6	1	2
2	(Slovakia) H Nagyová (Ukraine) E Tatarkova	4	6	6

Quarterfinals
PR	(Romania) R Dragomir (Croatia) S Talaja	6^{1}	5
(Belarus) T Poutchek (Russia) An Rodionova	7	7
(Argentina) G Dulko (Argentina) ME Salerni	6	6
Q	(Czech Republic) I Benešová (Slovakia) Ľ Kurhajcová	4	4
(Italy) Ad Serra Zanetti (Italy) An Serra Zanetti	7	4	6
4	(Spain) M Marrero (Paraguay) R de los Ríos	5	6	4
WC	(Spain) RM Andrés Rodríguez (Morocco) B Mouhtassine	5	2
2	(Slovakia) H Nagyová (Ukraine) E Tatarkova	7	6

Semifinals
(Belarus) T Poutchek (Russia) An Rodionova	3	7	4
(Argentina) G Dulko (Argentina) ME Salerni	6	5	6
(Italy) Ad Serra Zanetti (Italy) An Serra Zanetti	5	6	4
2	(Slovakia) H Nagyová (Ukraine) E Tatarkova	7	2	6

Final
(Argentina) G Dulko (Argentina) ME Salerni	6	6
2	(Slovakia) H Nagyová (Ukraine) E Tatarkova	3	4
