= 2004 Tippmix Budapest Grand Prix – Singles =

Singles
- 2004 Tippmix Budapest Grand Prix

Final
- Champion: (Serbia and Montenegro) Jelena Janković
- Runner-up: (Slovakia) Martina Suchá
- Score: 7–6^{(7–4)}, 6–3

Details
- Draw: 32
- Seeds: 8

Events
Singles	Doubles
← 2003 ·	Hungarian Ladies Open	· 2005 →

Magüi Serna was the defending champion from 2003, but chose not to compete in 2004.

Jelena Janković won this title, defeating Martina Suchá in the final in straight sets, 7–6^{(7–4)}, 6–3.

== Seeds ==
1. (France) Émilie Loit (withdrew)
2. (Hungary) Petra Mandula (quarterfinals)
3. (Hungary) Anikó Kapros (quarterfinals)
4. (Germany) Anca Barna (first round)
5. (Austria) Barbara Schett (second round)
6. (Czech Republic) Iveta Benešová (semifinals)
7. (Spain) Arantxa Parra Santonja (second round)
8. (Serbia and Montenegro) Jelena Janković (winner)
9. (Hungary) Melinda Czink (first round)

== Draw ==
=== Key ===
- Q = Qualifier
- WC = Wild card
- LL = Lucky loser
- Alt = Alternate
- SE = Special exempt
- PR = Protected ranking
- ITF = ITF entry
- JE = Junior exempt
- w/o = Walkover
- r = Retired
- d = Defaulted
- SR = Special ranking

=== Finals ===
Semifinals
(Italy) Flavia Pennetta	3	4
8	(Serbia and Montenegro) Jelena Janković	6	6
6	(Czech Republic) Iveta Benešová	6	5	0
(Slovakia) Martina Suchá	4	7	6

Final
8	(Serbia and Montenegro) Jelena Janković	7	6
(Slovakia) Martina Suchá	6^{4}	3

=== Top half ===
First round
9	(Hungary) M Czink	3	6	4
(Italy) T Garbin	6	3	6
Q	(Croatia) S Mamić	6	6
(Spain) G León García	1	4
WC	(Hungary) Z Gubacsi	3	4
(Italy) F Pennetta	6	6
LL	(Romania) E Gallovits	2	4
5	(Austria) B Schett	6	6
4	(Germany) A Barna	4	6	2
(Slovakia) Ľ Cervanová	6	2	6
Q	(India) S Uberoi	3	2
(France) M Bartoli	6	6
(Italy) R Vinci	6	6
(Slovakia) Ľ Kurhajcová	3	4
LL	(Slovakia) D Nociarová	2	3
8	(Serbia and Montenegro) J Janković	6	6

Second round
(Italy) T Garbin	6	2	5
Q	(Croatia) S Mamić	4	6	7
(Italy) F Pennetta	6	6
5	(Austria) B Schett	2	1
(Slovakia) Ľ Cervanová	7	7
(France) M Bartoli	6^{3}	5
(Italy) R Vinci	2	6	6^{5}
8	(Serbia and Montenegro) J Janković	6	1	7

Quarterfinals
Q	(Croatia) S Mamić	4	6	2
(Italy) F Pennetta	6	2	6
(Slovakia) Ľ Cervanová	0	0
8	(Serbia and Montenegro) J Janković	6	6

Semifinals
(Italy) F Pennetta	3	4
8	(Serbia and Montenegro) J Janković	6	6

=== Bottom half ===
First round
6	(Czech Republic) I Benešová	6^{3}	6	6
LL	(France) S Foretz	7	4	2
(Ukraine) J Vakulenko	6	6
Q	(Spain) P García	3	1
(Australia) S Stosur	6	5	6
Q	(Hungary) K Nagy	4	7	4
(Croatia) S Talaja	3	4
3	(Hungary) A Kapros	6	6
7	(Spain) A Parra Santonja	6	6
(Czech Republic) K Koukalová	3	1
WC	(Slovenia) A Klepač	6^{3}	4
(Slovakia) M Suchá	7	6
(Ukraine) T Perebiynis	6^{4}	2
LL	(Austria) Y Meusburger	7	6
(France) V Razzano	4	0
2	(Hungary) P Mandula	6	6

Second round
6	(Czech Republic) I Benešová	7	3	6
(Ukraine) J Vakulenko	5	6	2
(Australia) S Stosur	2	1
3	(Hungary) A Kapros	6	6
7	(Spain) A Parra Santonja	4	0
(Slovakia) M Suchá	6	6
LL	(Austria) Y Meusburger	4	1
2	(Hungary) P Mandula	6	6

Quarterfinals
6	(Czech Republic) I Benešová	6	6
3	(Hungary) A Kapros	2	1
(Slovakia) M Suchá	5	6	6
2	(Hungary) P Mandula	7	2	3

Semifinals
6	(Czech Republic) I Benešová	6	5	0
(Slovakia) M Suchá	4	7	6
