= 2004 Tippmix Budapest Grand Prix – Doubles =

Doubles
- 2004 Tippmix Budapest Grand Prix

Final
- Champion: (Hungary) Petra Mandula (Austria) Barbara Schett
- Runner-up: (Hungary) Virág Németh (Hungary) Ágnes Szávay
- Score: 6–3, 6–2

Details
- Draw: 14
- Seeds: 4

Events
Singles	Doubles
- Hungarian Ladies Open

Petra Mandula and Elena Tatarkova were the defending champions, but Tatarkova didn't play in 2004.

Mandula successfully defended her title, playing with Barbara Schett.

== Results ==
=== Seeds ===
1. (Hungary) Petra Mandula / (Austria) Barbara Schett (champions)
2. (Czech Republic) Iveta Benešová / (Slovakia) Ľubomíra Kurhajcová (semifinals)
3. (Australia) Bryanne Stewart / (Australia) Samantha Stosur (quarterfinals)
4. (Hungary) Zsófia Gubacsi / (Hungary) Kira Nagy (quarterfinals)

Key

- Q = Qualifier
- WC = Wild card
- LL = Lucky loser
- Alt = Alternate
- ITF = ITF entry
- PR = Protected ranking
- SR = Special ranking
- SE = Special exempt
- JE = Junior exempt
- JR = Junior Accelerator Programme entrant
- CO = College Accelerator Programme entrant
- NG = Next Gen Accelerator Program entrant
- w/o = Walkover
- r = Retired
- d = Defaulted

=== Draw ===
First round
(France) S Foretz (France) V Razzano	6	6
(Hungary) M Czink (Hungary) A Kapros	2	1
4	(Hungary) Z Gubacsi (Hungary) K Nagy	6	6
(Hungary) J Ács (Hungary) Z Fodor	2	2
(Spain) G León García (Spain) A Parra Santonja	3	2
(Austria) B Schwartz (Germany) J Wöhr	6	6
WC	(Hungary) V Németh (Hungary) Á Szávay	4	6	7
(Spain) P García (Spain) C Torrens Valero	6	2	5
(United States) N Uberoi (India) S Uberoi	6^{6}	3
3	(Australia) B Stewart (Australia) S Stosur	7	6
(Germany) An Barna (Ukraine) J Vakulenko	3	5
(Romania) E Gallovits (Croatia) L Popadić	6	7

Quarterfinals
1	(Hungary) P Mandula (Austria) B Schett	4	6	6
(France) S Foretz (France) V Razzano	6	0	4
4	(Hungary) Z Gubacsi (Hungary) K Nagy	6	4	2
(Austria) B Schwartz (Germany) J Wöhr	2	6	6
WC	(Hungary) V Németh (Hungary) Á Szávay	6	7
3	(Australia) B Stewart (Australia) S Stosur	3	6^{2}
(Romania) E Gallovits (Croatia) L Popadić	1	3
2	(Czech Republic) I Benešová (Slovakia) Ľ Kurhajcová	6	6

Semifinals
1	(Hungary) P Mandula (Austria) B Schett	6	6
(Austria) B Schwartz (Germany) J Wöhr	1	2
WC	(Hungary) V Németh (Hungary) Á Szávay	3
2	(Czech Republic) I Benešová (Slovakia) Ľ Kurhajcová	2	r

Final
1	(Hungary) P Mandula (Austria) B Schett	6	6
WC	(Hungary) V Németh (Hungary) Á Szávay	3	2
