= 2006 Budapest Grand Prix – Doubles =

Doubles
- 2006 Budapest Grand Prix

Final
- Champions: (Slovakia) Janette Husárová (Netherlands) Michaëlla Krajicek
- Runners-up: (Czech Republic) Lucie Hradecká (Czech Republic) Renata Voráčová
- Score: 4–6, 6–4, 6–4

Details
- Draw: 16
- Seeds: 4

Events
Singles	Doubles
- Hungarian Ladies Open

Émilie Loit and Katarina Srebotnik were the defending champions, but none competed this year.

The third-seeded team of Janette Husárová and Michaëlla Krajicek won the title by defeating Lucie Hradecká and Renata Voráčová 4–6, 6–4, 6–4 in the final.

== Seeds ==
1. (Czech Republic) Iveta Benešová / (Ukraine) Yuliana Fedak (quarterfinals)
2. (Greece) Eleni Daniilidou / (Germany) Jasmin Wöhr (semifinals, retired due to a right toe injury on Wöhr)
3. (Slovakia) Janette Husárová / (Netherlands) Michaëlla Krajicek (champions)
4. (Estonia) Maret Ani / (Hungary) Ágnes Szávay (first round)

== Draw ==
Key

- Q = Qualifier
- WC = Wild card
- LL = Lucky loser
- Alt = Alternate
- ITF = ITF entry
- PR = Protected ranking
- SR = Special ranking
- SE = Special exempt
- JE = Junior exempt
- JR = Junior Accelerator Programme entrant
- CO = College Accelerator Programme entrant
- NG = Next Gen Accelerator Program entrant
- w/o = Walkover
- r = Retired
- d = Defaulted

=== Draw ===
First round
1	(Czech Republic) I Benešová (Ukraine) Y Fedak	7^{7}	6
(Russia) E Bychkova (Poland) K Jans	6^{3}	4
(Czech Republic) E Birnerová (France) S Foretz	6	7^{7}
WC	(Hungary) C Borsányi (Hungary) Dora Kiss	2	6^{5}
3	(Slovakia) J Husárová (Netherlands) M Krajicek	6	4	6
(Spain) MJ Martínez Sánchez (Italy) An Serra Zanetti	2	6	0
Q	(Russia) A Kleybanova (Poland) U Radwańska	6	6
(Czech Republic) K Böhmová (Slovakia) J Gajdosova	4	3
(Czech Republic) G Navrátilová (Czech Republic) M Paštiková	6	6
(Poland) A Radwańska (Poland) A Rosolska	1	3
(Czech Republic) L Hradecká (Czech Republic) R Voráčová	6^{6}	6	6
4	(Estonia) M Ani (Hungary) Á Szávay	7^{8}	4	2
(Hungary) Z Gubacsi (Hungary) K Nagy	6	6
(Austria) D Klemenschits (Austria) S Klemenschits	1	2
(Germany) M Müller (Germany) J Schruff	3	2
2	(Greece) E Daniilidou (Germany) J Wöhr	6	6

Quarterfinals
1	(Czech Republic) I Benešová (Ukraine) Y Fedak	4	4
(Czech Republic) E Birnerová (France) S Foretz	6	6
3	(Slovakia) J Husárová (Netherlands) M Krajicek	4	6	6
Q	(Russia) A Kleybanova (Poland) U Radwańska	6	3	2
(Czech Republic) G Navrátilová (Czech Republic) M Paštiková	5	7^{7}	4
(Czech Republic) L Hradecká (Czech Republic) R Voráčová	7	6^{5}	6
(Hungary) Z Gubacsi (Hungary) K Nagy	3	7^{7}	2
2	(Greece) E Daniilidou (Germany) J Wöhr	6	6^{4}	6

Semifinals
(Czech Republic) E Birnerová (France) S Foretz	1	5
3	(Slovakia) J Husárová (Netherlands) M Krajicek	6	7
(Czech Republic) L Hradecká (Czech Republic) R Voráčová	6	4
2	(Greece) E Daniilidou (Germany) J Wöhr	4	2^{r}

Final
3	(Slovakia) J Husárová (Netherlands) M Krajicek	4	6	6
(Czech Republic) L Hradecká (Czech Republic) R Voráčová	6	4	4
