= 2003 Grand Prix SAR La Princesse Lalla Meryem – Singles =

Singles
- 2003 Grand Prix SAR La Princesse Lalla Meryem

Final
- Champion: (Italy) Rita Grande
- Runner-up: (Italy) Antonella Serra Zanetti
- Score: 6–2, 4–6, 6–1

Events
Singles	Doubles
← 2002 ·	Morocco Open	· 2004 →

Patricia Wartusch was the defending champion, but lost in the second round to Anastasia Rodionova.

Rita Grande won the title in an all-Italian final, defeating Antonella Serra Zanetti 6–2, 4–6, 6–1.

== Seeds ==
1. (France) Virginie Razzano (first round)
2. (Italy) Rita Grande (champion)
3. (Slovakia) Henrieta Nagyová (quarterfinals)
4. (Italy) ~~Flavia Pennetta~~ (withdrew)
5. (Czech Republic) Klára Koukalová (second round)
6. (Austria) Patricia Wartusch (second round)
7. (Czech Republic) Iveta Benešová (first round)
8. (Spain) Cristina Torrens Valero (second round)
9. (Spain) Conchita Martínez Granados (first round)

== Draw ==
=== Key ===
- Q = Qualifier
- WC = Wild card
- LL = Lucky loser
- Alt = Alternate
- ITF = ITF entry
- PR = Protected ranking
- SR = Special ranking
- SE = Special exempt
- JE = Junior exempt
- JR = Junior Accelerator Programme entrant
- CO = College Accelerator Programme entrant
- NG = Next Gen Accelerator Program entrant
- w/o = Walkover
- r = Retired
- d = Defaulted

=== Finals ===
Semifinals
(Slovakia) Ľudmila Cervanová	4	2
(Italy) Antonella Serra Zanetti	6	6
(Spain) Marta Marrero	7	5	3
2	(Italy) Rita Grande	6^{6}	7	6

Final
(Italy) Antonella Serra Zanetti	2	6	1
2	(Italy) Rita Grande	6	4	6

=== Top half ===
First round
1	(France) V Razzano	3	0
(Paraguay) R de los Ríos	6	6
(Germany) M Müller	1	2
Q	(Spain) G León García	6	6
(Slovakia) Ľ Cervanová	6	6
(Spain) M Sánchez Lorenzo	1	4
(Croatia) S Talaja	6^{2}	6	2
8	(Spain) C Torrens Valero	7	1	6
5	(Czech Republic) K Koukalová	6	1	6
Q	(Serbia and Montenegro) J Janković	4	6	1
(Italy) An Serra Zanetti	6	6
WC	(Tunisia) S Sfar	3	3
(Russia) An Rodionova	7	5	6
(Slovakia) M Suchá	5	7	3
(Italy) M Santangelo	4	3
6	(Austria) P Wartusch	6	6

Second round
(Paraguay) R de los Ríos	3	2
Q	(Spain) G León García	6	6
(Slovakia) Ľ Cervanová	7	6
8	(Spain) C Torrens Valero	5	1
5	(Czech Republic) K Koukalová	1	6	3
(Italy) An Serra Zanetti	6	4	6
(Russia) An Rodionova	6	6
6	(Austria) P Wartusch	2	2

Quarterfinals
Q	(Spain) G León García	6	0	4
(Slovakia) Ľ Cervanová	2	6	6
(Italy) An Serra Zanetti	7	0	6
(Russia) An Rodionova	5	6	2

Semifinals
(Slovakia) Ľ Cervanová	4	2
(Italy) An Serra Zanetti	6	6

=== Bottom half ===
First round
7	(Czech Republic) I Benešová	1	7	2
(Spain) M Marrero	6	5	6
Q	(Spain) A Medina Garrigues	7	6
(Croatia) J Kostanić	5	2
WC	(Morocco) B Mouhtassine	7	5	4
(Slovakia) E Fislová	6^{3}	7	6
PR	(Romania) R Dragomir	3	4
3	(Slovakia) H Nagyová	6	6
9	(Spain) C Martínez Granados	2	4
(Slovakia) Ľ Kurhajcová	6	6
(Belarus) T Poutchek	6	3	7
LL	(Argentina) ME Salerni	1	6	5
Q	(Hungary) R Kuti-Kis	6^{4}	6^{4}
LL	(Italy) ME Camerin	7	7
(Italy) Ad Serra Zanetti	3	5
2	(Italy) R Grande	6	7

Second round
(Spain) M Marrero	6	6
Q	(Spain) A Medina Garrigues	2	3
(Slovakia) E Fislová	6	3	6^{2}
3	(Slovakia) H Nagyová	2	6	7
(Slovakia) Ľ Kurhajcová	7	6
(Belarus) T Poutchek	6^{4}	2
LL	(Italy) ME Camerin	2	5
2	(Italy) R Grande	6	7

Quarterfinals
(Spain) M Marrero	6	6
3	(Slovakia) H Nagyová	4	4
(Slovakia) Ľ Kurhajcová	2	0
2	(Italy) R Grande	6	6

Semifinal
(Spain) M Marrero	7	5	3
2	(Italy) R Grande	6^{6}	7	6
