= 2004 Grand Prix SAR La Princesse Lalla Meryem – Singles =

Singles
- 2004 Grand Prix SAR La Princesse Lalla Meryem

Final
- Champion: (France) Émilie Loit
- Runner-up: (Slovakia) Ľudmila Cervanová
- Score: 6–2, 6–2

Events
| Singles | Doubles |
| ← 2003 · | Morocco Open | · 2005 → |

Rita Grande was the defending champion, but lost in the semifinals to Émilie Loit.

Loit defeated Ľudmila Cervanová 6–2, 6–2 in the final to win her WTA title.

== Seeds ==
1. (France) Émilie Loit (champion)
2. (France) Marion Bartoli (first round)
3. (Slovenia) Katarina Srebotnik (first round)
4. (Slovakia) Ľudmila Cervanová (final)
5. (Czech Republic) Iveta Benešová (first round)
6. (Ukraine) Julia Vakulenko (first round)
7. (Slovakia) Ľubomíra Kurhajcová (quarterfinals)
8. (Italy) Maria Elena Camerin (quarterfinals)

== Draw ==
=== Key ===
- Q = Qualifier
- WC = Wild card
- LL = Lucky loser
- Alt = Alternate
- SE = Special exempt
- PR = Protected ranking
- ITF = ITF entry
- JE = Junior exempt
- w/o = Walkover
- r = Retired
- d = Defaulted
- SR = Special ranking

=== Finals ===
Semifinals
1 | (France) Émilie Loit | 7 | 6
(Italy) Rita Grande | 6^{1} | 3
4 | (Slovakia) Ľudmila Cervanová | 7 | 6
(Czech Republic) Klára Koukalová | 5 | 4

Final
1 | (France) Émilie Loit | 6 | 6
4 | (Slovakia) Ľudmila Cervanová | 2 | 2

=== Top half ===
First round
1 | (France) É Loit | 5 | 6 | 6
WC | (India) S Mirza | 7 | 4 | 2
(Italy) A Serra Zanetti | 2 | 3
(Croatia) S Talaja | 6 | 6
(United States) A Spears | 7 | 3 | 4
Q | (Hungary) Z Gubacsi | 6^{2} | 6 | 6
(Spain) M Marrero | 3 | 6 | 6
5 | (Czech Republic) I Benešová | 6 | 3 | 1
3 | (Slovenia) K Srebotnik | 3 | 5
WC | (Morocco) B Mouhtassine | 6 | 7
(Slovakia) M Suchá | 5 | 1
(Italy) R Grande | 7 | 6
LL | (Czech Republic) M Paštiková | 6^{0} | 1
(Italy) F Pennetta | 7 | 6
(France) V Razzano | 2 | 2
7 | (Slovakia) Ľ Kurhajcová | 6 | 6

Second round
1 | (France) É Loit | 6 | 5 | 6
(Croatia) S Talaja | 2 | 7 | 4
Q | (Hungary) Z Gubacsi | 2 | 1
(Spain) M Marrero | 6 | 6
WC | (Morocco) B Mouhtassine | 3 | 3
(Italy) R Grande | 6 | 6
(Italy) F Pennetta | 4 | 3
7 | (Slovakia) Ľ Kurhajcová | 6 | 6

Quarter Finals
1 | (France) É Loit | 7 | 6
(Spain) M Marrero | 5 | 4
(Italy) R Grande | 6 | 1 | 6
7 | (Slovakia) Ľ Kurhajcová | 3 | 6 | 0

Semi Final
1 | (France) É Loit | 7 | 6
(Italy) R Grande | 6^{1} | 3

=== Bottom half ===
First round
6 | (Ukraine) J Vakulenko | 5 | 0
Q | (Poland) M Domachowska | 7 | 6
(Spain) G León García | 6 | 3 | 6
Q | (Hungary) K Nagy | 1 | 6 | 4
(Germany) A-L Grönefeld | 6^{3} | 5
(Czech Republic) E Birnerová | 7 | 7
(Belgium) E Callens | 2 | 1
4 | (Slovakia) Ľ Cervanová | 6 | 6
8 | (Italy) ME Camerin | 6 | 6
Q | (Italy) R Vinci | 4 | 2
(Spain) C Martínez Granados | 3 | 6 | 6
(Germany) J Schruff | 6 | 4 | 2
PR | (Austria) B Schwartz | 3 | 3
(Czech Republic) K Koukalová | 6 | 6
(France) S Cohen-Aloro | 7 | 6
2 | (France) M Bartoli | 5 | 3

Second round
Q | (Poland) M Domachowska | 6
(Spain) G León Garcia | 1 | r
(Czech Republic) E Birnerová | 3 | 3
4 | (Slovakia) Ľ Cervanová | 6 | 6
8 | (Italy) ME Camerin | 6 | 7
(Spain) C Martínez Granados | 3 | 5
(Czech Republic) K Koukalová | 6 | 6
(France) S Cohen-Aloro | 3 | 4

Quarter Finals
Q | (Poland) M Domachowska | 5 | 2
4 | (Slovakia) Ľ Cervanová | 7 | 6
8 | (Italy) ME Camerin | 3 | 2
(Czech Republic) K Koukalová | 6 | 6

Semi Final
4 | (Slovakia) Ľ Cervanová | 7 | 6
(Czech Republic) K Koukalová | 5 | 4
