= 2004 Grand Prix SAR La Princesse Lalla Meryem – Doubles =

Doubles
- 2004 Grand Prix SAR La Princesse Lalla Meryem

Final
- Champions: (France) Marion Bartoli (France) Émilie Loit
- Runners-up: (Belgium) Els Callens (Slovenia) Katarina Srebotnik
- Score: 6–4, 6–2

Events
Singles	Doubles
← 2003 ·	Morocco Open	· 2005 →

Gisela Dulko and María Emilia Salerni were the defending champions, but none competed this year.

Marion Bartoli and Émilie Loit won the title by defeating Els Callens and Katarina Srebotnik 6–4, 6–2 in the final.

== Seeds ==
1. (France) Marion Bartoli / (France) Émilie Loit (champions)
2. (Belgium) Els Callens / (Slovenia) Katarina Srebotnik (final)
3. (Estonia) Maret Ani / (Croatia) Silvija Talaja (semifinals)
4. (France) Stéphanie Cohen-Aloro / (Austria) Patricia Wartusch (semifinals)

== Draw ==
=== Key ===
- Q = Qualifier
- WC = Wild card
- LL = Lucky loser
- Alt = Alternate
- SE = Special exempt
- PR = Protected ranking
- ITF = ITF entry
- JE = Junior exempt
- w/o = Walkover
- r = Retired
- d = Defaulted
- SR = Special ranking

=== Draw ===
First round
1	(France) M Bartoli (France) É Loit	6	6
(Bulgaria) L Bacheva (Spain) C Martínez Granados	2	1
PR	(Austria) B Schwartz (Germany) J Wöhr	4	3
(Spain) M Marrero (Argentina) P Tarabini	6	6
3	(Estonia) M Ani (Croatia) S Talaja	6	7^{7}
(Hungary) Z Gubacsi (Hungary) K Nagy	2	6^{4}
WC	(Spain) RM Andrés (Morocco) B Mouhtassine	6^{3}	3
(Czech Republic) O Blahotová (Czech Republic) G Navrátilová	7^{7}	6
(Italy) ME Camerin (Italy) F Pennetta	6	7^{15}
(United States) A Spears (Ukraine) J Vakulenko	1	6^{13}
(Czech Republic) E Birnerová (Czech Republic) Ľ Kurhajcová	6^{4}	6	3
4	(France) S Cohen-Aloro (Austria) P Wartusch	7^{7}	4	6
(Italy) Ad Serra Zanetti (Italy) An Serra Zanetti	6	3	6
(Czech Republic) I Benešová (Czech Republic) M Paštiková	3	6	4
Q	(Austria) D Klemenschits (Austria) S Klemenschits	3	1
2	(Belgium) E Callens (Slovenia) K Srebotnik	6	6

Quarterfinals
1	(France) M Bartoli (France) É Loit	6	6
(Spain) M Marrero (Argentina) P Tarabini	4	4
3	(Estonia) M Ani (Croatia) S Talaja	6	4	7
(Czech Republic) O Blahotová (Czech Republic) G Navrátilová	4	6	5
(Italy) ME Camerin (Italy) F Pennetta	4	6	2
4	(France) S Cohen-Aloro (Austria) P Wartusch	6	2	6
(Italy) Ad Serra Zanetti (Italy) An Serra Zanetti	5	6^{9}
2	(Belgium) E Callens (Slovenia) K Srebotnik	7	7^{11}

Semifinals
1	(France) M Bartoli (France) É Loit	6	6^{2}	6
3	(Estonia) M Ani (Croatia) S Talaja	4	7^{7}	1
4	(France) S Cohen-Aloro (Austria) P Wartusch	3	4
2	(Belgium) E Callens (Slovenia) K Srebotnik	6	6

Final
1	(France) M Bartoli (France) É Loit	6	6
2	(Belgium) E Callens (Slovenia) K Srebotnik	4	2
