= 2002 Grand Prix SAR La Princesse Lalla Meryem – Singles =

Singles
- 2002 Grand Prix SAR La Princesse Lalla Meryem

Final
- Champion: (Austria) Patricia Wartusch
- Runner-up: (Czech Republic) Klára Koukalová
- Score: 5–7, 6–3, 6–3

Details
- Draw: 32 (2WC/4Q)
- Seeds: 8

Events
Singles	Doubles
← 2001 ·	Morocco Open	· 2003 →

Zsófia Gubacsi was the defending champion, but lost in the quarterfinals to Gisela Dulko.

Patricia Wartusch won the title by defeating Klára Koukalová 5–7, 6–3, 6–3 in the final.

== Seeds ==
1. (Germany) Marlene Weingärtner (first round)
2. (Spain) Ángeles Montolio (second round)
3. (Hungary) Petra Mandula (quarterfinals)
4. (Slovakia) Ľudmila Cervanová (quarterfinals, retired)
5. (Spain) Conchita Martínez Granados (second round)
6. (Austria) Patricia Wartusch (champion)
7. (Hungary) Zsófia Gubacsi (quarterfinals)
8. (Austria) Evelyn Fauth (first round)

== Draw ==
=== Key ===
- Q = Qualifier
- WC = Wild card
- LL = Lucky loser
- Alt = Alternate
- SE = Special exempt
- PR = Protected ranking
- ITF = ITF entry
- JE = Junior exempt
- w/o = Walkover
- r = Retired
- d = Defaulted
- SR = Special ranking

=== Finals ===
Semifinals
6	(Austria) Patricia Wartusch	5	7	6
(Russia) Svetlana Kuznetsova	7	5	1
(Czech Republic) Klára Koukalová	1	7	6
(Argentina) Gisela Dulko	6	5	4

Final
6	(Austria) Patricia Wartusch	5	6	6
(Czech Republic) Klára Koukalová	7	3	3

=== Top half ===
First round
1	(Germany) M Weingärtner	1	0
(Russia) A Rodionova	6	6
(Italy) ME Camerin	4	6	6
(Morocco) B Mouhtassine	6	1	3
(United States) K Brandi	6	6
(Italy) V Sassi	3	2
(Hungary) K Marosi	3	6^{6}
6	(Austria) P Wartusch	6	7^{8}
4	(Slovakia) Ľ Cervanová	6	6
(Czech Republic) R Voráčová	4	3
(Spain) A Goñi	7^{7}	6
(Italy) R Vinci	6^{5}	4
Q	(Russia) M Kondratieva	6^{5}	3
(Russia) S Kuznetsova	7^{7}	6
Q	(United States) T Dabek	3	0
5	(Spain) C Martínez Granados	6	6

Second round
(Russia) A Rodionova	1	2^{r}
(Italy) ME Camerin	6	5
(United States) K Brandi	6^{2}	6	2
6	(Austria) P Wartusch	7^{7}	2	6
4	(Slovakia) Ľ Cervanová	6	6
(Spain) A Goñi	1	2
(Russia) S Kuznetsova	6	6
5	(Spain) C Martínez Granados	2	0

Quarterfinals
(Italy) ME Camerin	6	4	4
6	(Austria) P Wartusch	0	6	6
4	(Slovakia) Ľ Cervanová	2	0^{r}
(Russia) S Kuznetsova	6	3

Semifinals
6	(Austria) P Wartusch	5	7	6
(Russia) S Kuznetsova	7	5	1

=== Bottom half ===
First round
8	(Austria) E Fauth	3	4
(Czech Republic) K Koukalová	6	6
Q	(Romania) E Gallovits	6	7^{7}
(Slovakia) Ľ Kurhajcová	1	6^{5}
(Canada) MÈ Pelletier	7^{7}	6
WC	(Algeria) F Esseghir	6^{3}	4
(Czech Republic) A Vašková	6	4	4
3	(Hungary) P Mandula	1	6	6
7	(Hungary) Z Gubacsi	6	6
Q	(Sweden) M Wolfbrandt	1	3
(Czech Republic) L Němečková	6	6
(Japan) A Morigami	4	0
WC	(Morocco) Meryem El Haddad	3	0
(Australia) C Watson	6	6
(Argentina) G Dulko	6	2	6
2	(Spain) Á Montolio	2	6	1

Second round
(Czech Republic) K Koukalová	6	1	7
Q	(Romania) E Gallovits	2	6	5
(Canada) MÈ Pelletier	6^{3}	2
3	(Hungary) P Mandula	7^{7}	6
7	(Hungary) Z Gubacsi	6	6
(Czech Republic) L Němečková	2	3
(Australia) C Watson	3	2
(Argentina) G Dulko	6	6

Quarterfinals
(Czech Republic) K Koukalová	6	6
3	(Hungary) P Mandula	2	2
7	(Hungary) Z Gubacsi	7	2	1
(Argentina) G Dulko	5	6	6

Semifinals
(Czech Republic) K Koukalová	1	7	6
(Argentina) G Dulko	6	5	4
