= 2005 Tippmix Budapest Grand Prix – Doubles =

Doubles
- 2005 Tippmix Budapest Grand Prix

Final
- Champions: (France) Émilie Loit (Slovenia) Katarina Srebotnik
- Runners-up: (Spain) Lourdes Domínguez Lino (Spain) Marta Marrero
- Score: 6–1, 3–6, 6–2

Details
- Draw: 16
- Seeds: 4

Events
Singles	Doubles
- Hungarian Ladies Open

Petra Mandula and Barbara Schett were the defending champions, but both players retired from professional tennis during this year. Mandula played her last match at the first round of the French Open against Anabel Medina Garrigues, while Schett retired at the Australian Open following her second-round defeat against Daniela Hantuchová.

The top-seeded pairing Émilie Loit and Katarina Srebotnik won the title by defeating Lourdes Domínguez Lino and Marta Marrero 6–1, 3–6, 6–2 in the final.

== Seeds ==
1. (France) Émilie Loit / (Slovenia) Katarina Srebotnik (champions)
2. (Czech Republic) Gabriela Navrátilová / (Czech Republic) Michaela Paštiková (first round)
3. (Switzerland) Emmanuelle Gagliardi / (Croatia) Jelena Kostanić (first round, withdrew due to a right hip strain on Gagliardi)
4. (Spain) Lourdes Domínguez Lino / (Spain) Marta Marrero (final)

== Draw ==
Key

- Q = Qualifier
- WC = Wild card
- LL = Lucky loser
- Alt = Alternate
- ITF = ITF entry
- PR = Protected ranking
- SR = Special ranking
- SE = Special exempt
- JE = Junior exempt
- JR = Junior Accelerator Programme entrant
- CO = College Accelerator Programme entrant
- NG = Next Gen Accelerator Program entrant
- w/o = Walkover
- r = Retired
- d = Defaulted

=== Draw ===
First round
1	(France) É Loit (Slovenia) K Srebotnik	6	6
(Tunisia) S Sfar (Hungary) Á Szávay	1	1
(Poland) K Jans (Poland) A Rosolska	3	6	3
(United Kingdom) C Curran (Japan) R Fujiwara	6	4	6
3	(Switzerland) E Gagliardi (Croatia) J Kostanić
WC	(Hungary) Z Gubacsi (Hungary) K Nagy	w/o
(Austria) D Klemenschits (Austria) S Klemenschits	6	4	6
(Czech Republic) D Chládková (Czech Republic) R Voráčová	3	6	2
(Argentina) E Krauth (Slovakia) Ľ Kurhajcová	6	7
(Spain) C Martínez Granados (Italy) An Serra Zanetti	3	5
(Australia) T Musgrave (Germany) J Wöhr	6	3	5
4	(Spain) L Domínguez Lino (Spain) M Marrero	4	6	7
Q	(Colombia) C Castaño (Spain) L Pous Tió	4	4
(Czech Republic) E Birnerová (Romania) A Vanc	6	6
(Czech Republic) L Hradecká (Czech Republic) V Uhlířová	6	6
2	(Czech Republic) G Navrátilová (Czech Republic) M Paštiková	2	4

Quarterfinals
1	(France) É Loit (Slovenia) K Srebotnik	6	6
(United Kingdom) C Curran (Japan) R Fujiwara	1	1
WC	(Hungary) Z Gubacsi (Hungary) K Nagy	2	2
(Austria) D Klemenschits (Austria) S Klemenschits	6	6
(Argentina) E Krauth (Slovakia) Ľ Kurhajcová	6	3	1
4	(Spain) L Domínguez Lino (Spain) M Marrero	4	6	6
(Czech Republic) E Birnerová (Romania) A Vanc	6	2	6
(Czech Republic) L Hradecká (Czech Republic) V Uhlířová	2	6	2

Semifinals
1	(France) É Loit (Slovenia) K Srebotnik	6	6
(Austria) D Klemenschits (Austria) S Klemenschits	0	0
4	(Spain) L Domínguez Lino (Spain) M Marrero	7	1	7^{7}
(Czech Republic) E Birnerová (Romania) A Vanc	5	6	6^{3}

Final
1	(France) É Loit (Slovenia) K Srebotnik	6	3	6
4	(Spain) L Domínguez Lino (Spain) M Marrero	1	6	2
