= 2002 Grand Prix SAR La Princesse Lalla Meryem – Doubles =

Doubles
- 2002 Grand Prix SAR La Princesse Lalla Meryem

Final
- Champions: (Hungary) Petra Mandula (Austria) Patricia Wartusch
- Runners-up: (Argentina) Gisela Dulko (Spain) Conchita Martínez Granados
- Score: 6–2, 6–1

Events
| Singles | Doubles |
| ← 2001 · | Morocco Open | · 2003 → |

Lubomira Bacheva and Åsa Svensson were the defending champions, but both players chose to compete at Palermo in the same week.

Petra Mandula and Patricia Wartusch won the final title by defeating Gisela Dulko and Conchita Martínez Granados 6–2, 6–1.

== Seeds ==
1. (Hungary) Petra Mandula / (Austria) Patricia Wartusch (champions)
2. (South Africa) Kim Grant / (Australia) Trudi Musgrave (semifinals)
3. (Russia) Anastasia Rodionova / (Germany) Marlene Weingärtner (quarterfinals)
4. (Russia) Svetlana Kuznetsova / (Spain) María José Martínez Sánchez (semifinals)

== Draw ==
=== Key ===
- Q = Qualifier
- WC = Wild card
- LL = Lucky loser
- Alt = Alternate
- SE = Special exempt
- PR = Protected ranking
- ITF = ITF entry
- JE = Junior exempt
- w/o = Walkover
- r = Retired
- d = Defaulted
- SR = Special ranking

=== Draw ===
First round
1 | (Hungary) P Mandula (Austria) P Wartusch | 6 | 6
(Japan) A Morigami (Canada) MÈ Pelletier | 2 | 4
Q | (Argentina) M Arévalo (Slovakia) Ľ Kurhajcová | 7 | 3 | 5
(Czech Republic) L Němečková (Czech Republic) R Voráčová | 5 | 6 | 7
4 | (Russia) S Kuznetsova (Spain) MJ Martínez Sánchez | 6 | 6
(Federal Republic of Yugoslavia) K Dašković (Austria) D Klemenschits | 4 | 3
(Czech Republic) K Koukalová (Czech Republic) A Vašková | 3 | 2
(Morocco) B Mouhtassine (Italy) V Sassi | 6 | 6
(Argentina) G Dulko (Spain) C Martínez Granados | 3 | 6 | 6
(United States) E Schmidt (Netherlands) A van Exel | 6 | 4 | 1
(Hungary) Z Gubacsi (Hungary) K Marosi | 3 | 6^{1}
3 | (Russia) A Rodionova (Germany) M Weingärtner | 6 | 7^{7}
(Italy) ME Camerin (South Africa) C Scheepers | 6 | 6
WC | (Algeria) F Esseghir (Morocco) Meryem El Haddad | 2 | 4
(Russia) G Fattakhetdinova (Russia) M Kondratieva | 6^{8} | 3
2 | (South Africa) K Grant (Australia) T Musgrave | 7^{10} | 6

Quarterfinals
1 | (Hungary) P Mandula (Austria) P Wartusch | 4 | 6 | 6
(Czech Republic) L Němečková (Czech Republic) R Voráčová | 6 | 0 | 2
4 | (Russia) S Kuznetsova (Spain) MJ Martínez Sánchez | 6 | 6
(Morocco) B Mouhtassine (Italy) V Sassi | 1 | 3
(Argentina) G Dulko (Spain) C Martínez Granados | 6 | 3 | 6
3 | (Russia) A Rodionova (Germany) M Weingärtner | 2 | 6 | 3
(Italy) ME Camerin (South Africa) C Scheepers | 6 | 1 | 3
2 | (South Africa) K Grant (Australia) T Musgrave | 3 | 6 | 6

Semifinals
1 | (Hungary) P Mandula (Austria) P Wartusch | 6 | 3 | 6
4 | (Russia) S Kuznetsova (Spain) MJ Martínez Sánchez | 4 | 6 | 2
(Argentina) G Dulko (Spain) C Martínez Granados | 7 | 6
2 | (South Africa) K Grant (Australia) T Musgrave | 5 | 2

Final
1 | (Hungary) P Mandula (Austria) P Wartusch | 6 | 6
(Argentina) G Dulko (Spain) C Martínez Granados | 2 | 1
