= 2001 Grand Prix SAR La Princesse Lalla Meryem =

- Date: 23 – 29 July
- Edition: 1st
- Category: Tier V
- Draw: 32S / 16D
- Prize money: $110,000
- Surface: Clay / outdoor
- Location: Casablanca, Morocco

Champions

Singles
- (Hungary) Zsófia Gubacsi

Doubles
- (Bulgaria) Lubomira Bacheva / (Sweden) Åsa Carlsson
Morocco Open	· 2002 →

The 2001 Grand Prix SAR La Princesse Lalla Meryem was a women's tennis tournament played on outdoor clay courts in Casablanca, Morocco that was part of the Tier V category of the 2001 WTA Tour. It was the inaugural edition of the tournament and was held from 23 July until 29 July 2001. Unseeded Zsófia Gubacsi won the singles title and earned $16,000 first-prize money.

== Finals ==
=== Singles ===
(Hungary) Zsófia Gubacsi defeated (Italy) Maria Elena Camerin 1–6, 6–3, 7–6^{(7–5)}

- It was Gubacsi's only singles title of her career.

=== Doubles ===
(Bulgaria) Lubomira Bacheva / (Sweden) Åsa Carlsson defeated (Spain) María José Martínez Sánchez / (Argentina) María Emilia Salerni 6–3, 6–7^{(4–7)}, 6–1
