= 2001 Colortex Budapest Grand Prix =

- Date: 16–22 April
- Edition: 6th
- Category: Tier V
- Draw: 32S / 16D
- Prize money: $110,000
- Surface: Clay / outdoor
- Location: Budapest, Hungary

Champions

Singles
- (Bulgaria) Magdalena Maleeva

Doubles
- (Italy) Tathiana Garbin / (Slovakia) Janette Husárová
← 2000 ·	Hungarian Ladies Open	· 2002 →

The 2001 Colortex Budapest Grand Prix was a women's tennis tournament played on outdoor clay courts in Budapest, Hungary and was part of Tier V of the 2001 WTA Tour. It was the sixth edition of the tournament and ran from 16 April until 22 April 2001. First-seeded Magdalena Maleeva won the singles title and earned $16,000 first-prize money.

== Finals ==
=== Singles ===
(Bulgaria) Magdalena Maleeva defeated (Luxembourg) Anne Kremer 3–6, 6–2, 6–4

- It was Maleeva's only singles title of the year and the 8th of her career.

=== Doubles ===
(Italy) Tathiana Garbin / (Slovakia) Janette Husárová defeated (Hungary) Zsófia Gubacsi / (Federal Republic of Yugoslavia) Dragana Zarić 6–1, 6–3

- It was Garbin's 2nd title of the year and the 4th of her career. It was Husárová's 3rd title of the year and the 8th of her career.
