= 2003 Tippmix Budapest Grand Prix – Doubles =

Doubles
- 2003 Tippmix Budapest Grand Prix

Final
- Champions: (Hungary) Petra Mandula (Ukraine) Elena Tatarkova
- Runners-up: (Spain) Conchita Martínez Granados (Ukraine) Tatiana Perebiynis
- Score: 6–3, 6–1

Details
- Draw: 16
- Seeds: 4

Events
Singles	Doubles
- Hungarian Ladies Open

Catherine Barclay and Émilie Loit were the defending champions, but Loit did not compete this year. Barclay teamed up with Ruxandra Dragomir Ilie and lost in the first round to Evgenia Kulikovskaya and Silvija Talaja.

First-seeded team of Petra Mandula and Elena Tatarkova won the title by defeating Conchita Martínez Granados and Tatiana Perebiynis 6–3, 6–1 in the final.

== Seeds ==
1. (Hungary) Petra Mandula / (Ukraine) Elena Tatarkova (champions)
2. (Netherlands) Kristie Boogert / (Spain) Magüi Serna (first round)
3. (France) Caroline Dhenin / (France) Alexandra Fusai (semifinals)
4. (Spain) Conchita Martínez Granados / (Ukraine) Tatiana Perebiynis (final)

== Draw ==
Key

- Q = Qualifier
- WC = Wild card
- LL = Lucky loser
- Alt = Alternate
- ITF = ITF entry
- PR = Protected ranking
- SR = Special ranking
- SE = Special exempt
- JE = Junior exempt
- JR = Junior Accelerator Programme entrant
- CO = College Accelerator Programme entrant
- NG = Next Gen Accelerator Program entrant
- w/o = Walkover
- r = Retired
- d = Defaulted

=== Draw ===
First round
1	(Hungary) P Mandula (Ukraine) E Tatarkova	6	6
(Bulgaria) L Bacheva (Romania) A Vanc	4	1
(Germany) M Müller (Germany) A Rösch	2	0
(Argentina) G Dulko (Paraguay) R de los Ríos	6	6
3	(France) C Dhenin (France) A Fusai	6	6
WC	(Hungary) A Földényi (Hungary) V Németh	2	1
Q	(Czech Republic) I Benešová (Czech Republic) L Němečková	6	6
(Hungary) Z Gubacsi (Hungary) K Marosi	2	3
(Russia) E Kulikovskaya (Croatia) S Talaja	6	7
(Australia) C Barclay (Romania) R Dragomir Ilie	4	5
(Italy) Ad Serra Zanetti (Italy) An Serra Zanetti	2	7^{7}	2
4	(Spain) C Martínez Granados (Ukraine) T Perebiynis	6	6^{5}	6
(South Africa) N Grandin (South Africa) K Grant	6^{4}	6	3
(South Africa) S de Beer (Germany) K Freye	7^{7}	4	6
(Australia) A Molik (Australia) T Musgrave	6	0	6
2	(Netherlands) K Boogert (Spain) M Serna	3	6	4

Quarterfinals
1	(Hungary) P Mandula (Ukraine) E Tatarkova	6	5	6
(Argentina) G Dulko (Paraguay) R de los Ríos	2	7	2
3	(France) C Dhenin (France) A Fusai	6	7^{7}
Q	(Czech Republic) I Benešová (Czech Republic) L Němečková	2	6^{4}
(Russia) E Kulikovskaya (Croatia) S Talaja	2	2
4	(Spain) C Martínez Granados (Ukraine) T Perebiynis	6	6
(South Africa) S de Beer (Germany) K Freye	6	4	6
(Australia) A Molik (Australia) T Musgrave	4	6	2

Semifinals
1	(Hungary) P Mandula (Ukraine) E Tatarkova	6	6
3	(France) C Dhenin (France) A Fusai	2	4
4	(Spain) C Martínez Granados (Ukraine) T Perebiynis	6	3	6
(South Africa) S de Beer (Germany) K Freye	3	6	2

Final
1	(Hungary) P Mandula (Ukraine) E Tatarkova	6	6
4	(Spain) C Martínez Granados (Ukraine) T Perebiynis	3	1
