= 2002 Grand Prix SAR La Princesse Lalla Meryem =

- Date: 8 – 14 July
- Edition: 2nd
- Category: Tier V
- Draw: 32S / 16D
- Prize money: $110,000
- Surface: Clay / outdoor
- Location: Casablanca, Morocco

Champions

Singles
- (Austria) Patricia Wartusch

Doubles
- (Hungary) Petra Mandula / (Austria) Patricia Wartusch
| ← 2001 · | Morocco Open | · 2003 → |

The 2002 Grand Prix SAR La Princesse Lalla Meryem was a women's tennis tournament played on outdoor clay courts in Casablanca, Morocco that was part of the Tier V category of the 2002 WTA Tour. It was the second edition of the tournament and was held from 8 July until 14 July 2002. Sixth-seeded Patricia Wartusch won the singles title and earned $16,000 first-prize money.

== Finals ==
=== Singles ===
(Austria) Patricia Wartusch defeated (Czech Republic) Klára Koukalová 5–7, 6–3, 6–3

- It was Wartusch' 1st singles title of her the year and the 2nd of her career.

=== Doubles ===
(Hungary) Petra Mandula / (Austria) Patricia Wartusch defeated (Argentina) Gisela Dulko / (Spain) Conchita Martínez Granados 6–2, 6–1
