= 2006 Budapest Grand Prix – Singles =

Singles
- 2006 Budapest Grand Prix

Final
- Champion: (Israel) Anna Smashnova
- Runner-up: (Spain) Lourdes Domínguez Lino
- Score: 6–1, 6–3

Details
- Draw: 32
- Seeds: 8

Events
Singles	Doubles
- Hungarian Ladies Open

Anna Smashnova was the defending champion and successfully defended her title, by defeating Lourdes Domínguez Lino 6–1, 6–3 in the final. This was Smashnova's final WTA singles title before her retirement in 2007.

== Seeds ==
1. (Colombia) Catalina Castaño (quarterfinals)
2. (Netherlands) Michaëlla Krajicek (semifinals)
3. (Czech Republic) Klára Zakopalová (first round)
4. (Czech Republic) Iveta Benešová (second round)
5. (Spain) Lourdes Domínguez Lino (final)
6. (Germany) Julia Schruff (first round)
7. (Slovakia) Martina Suchá (second round)
8. (Israel) Anna Smashnova (champion)

== Draw ==
Key

- Q = Qualifier
- WC = Wild card
- LL = Lucky loser
- Alt = Alternate
- ITF = ITF entry
- PR = Protected ranking
- SR = Special ranking
- SE = Special exempt
- JE = Junior exempt
- JR = Junior Accelerator Programme entrant
- CO = College Accelerator Programme entrant
- NG = Next Gen Accelerator Program entrant
- w/o = Walkover
- r = Retired
- d = Defaulted

=== Finals ===
Semifinals
8	(Israel) Anna Smashnova	6	6
(Germany) Martina Müller	4	3
5	(Spain) Lourdes Domínguez Lino	6	6
2	(Netherlands) Michaëlla Krajicek	3	4

Final
8	(Israel) Anna Smashnova	6	6
5	(Spain) Lourdes Domínguez Lino	1	3

=== Top half ===
First round
1	(Colombia) C Castaño	6	6
(Hungary) K Nagy	3	2
(France) A Rezaï	7	6
(Italy) An Serra Zanetti	5	0
Q	(Russia) A Kleybanova	3	4
(Spain) L Pous Tió	6	6
(Greece) E Daniilidou	1	6	3
8	(Israel) A Smashnova	6	3	6
3	(Czech Republic) K Zakopalová	1	6	1
Q	(Czech Republic) E Birnerová	6	3	6
WC	(Serbia and Montenegro) T Mirčić	3	1
(Estonia) K Kanepi	6	6
(Germany) M Müller	6	6
(Italy) N Viérin	1	2
(Slovakia) J Gajdošová	6^{5}	2
7	(Slovakia) M Suchá	7^{7}	6

Second round
1	(Colombia) C Castaño	6^{9}	6	6
(France) A Rezaï	7^{11}	1	3
(Spain) L Pous Tió	0	2
8	(Israel) A Smashnova	6	6
Q	(Czech Republic) E Birnerová	6	6
(Estonia) K Kanepi	2	4
(Germany) M Müller	6	6
7	(Slovakia) M Suchá	3	0

Quarterfinals
1	(Colombia) C Castaño	2	2
8	(Israel) A Smashnova	6	6
Q	(Czech Republic) E Birnerová	6^{7}	6	1
(Germany) M Müller	7^{9}	4	6

Semifinals
8	(Israel) A Smashnova	6	6
(Germany) M Müller	4	3

=== Bottom half ===
First round
5	(Spain) L Domínguez Lino	6	6
(Russia) E Bychkova	4	4
LL	(Poland) A Radwańska	6	6^{5}	3
Q	(Czech Republic) L Hradecká	4	7^{7}	6
WC	(Hungary) Z Gubacsi	1	3
(Italy) R Oprandi	6	6
(Czech Republic) K Böhmová	6^{10}	6	4
4	(Czech Republic) I Benešová	7^{12}	2	6
6	(Germany) J Schruff	2	0
(Ukraine) Y Fedak	6	6
Q	(Italy) S Errani	5	6	6
WC	(Hungary) Á Szávay	7	2	4
(Bulgaria) T Pironkova	6	6
(Estonia) M Ani	3	1
(France) S Foretz	1	7	1
2	(Netherlands) M Krajicek	6	5	6

Second round
5	(Spain) L Domínguez Lino	7^{7}	6
Q	(Czech Republic) L Hradecká	6^{5}	4
(Italy) R Oprandi	7	6
4	(Czech Republic) I Benešová	5	4
(Ukraine) Y Fedak	1	4
Q	(Italy) S Errani	6	6
(Bulgaria) T Pironkova	5	7^{7}	1
2	(Netherlands) M Krajicek	7	6^{3}	6

Quarterfinals
5	(Spain) L Domínguez Lino	6	6
(Italy) R Oprandi	3	0
Q	(Italy) S Errani	4	4
2	(Netherlands) M Krajicek	6	6

Semifinals
5	(Spain) L Domínguez Lino	6	6
2	(Netherlands) M Krajicek	3	4
