= 2005 Tippmix Budapest Grand Prix – Singles =

Singles
- 2005 Tippmix Budapest Grand Prix

Final
- Champion: (Israel) Anna Smashnova
- Runner-up: (Colombia) Catalina Castaño
- Score: 6–2, 6–2

Details
- Draw: 32
- Seeds: 8

Events
Singles	Doubles
← 2004 ·	Hungarian Ladies Open	· 2006 →

Jelena Janković was the defending champion, but decided to compete in Stanford at the same week.

First-seeded Anna Smashnova won the title by defeating Catalina Castaño 6–2, 6–2 in the final.

== Seeds ==
1. (Israel) Anna Smashnova (champion)
2. (Slovenia) Katarina Srebotnik (quarterfinals)
3. (Italy) Roberta Vinci (first round)
4. (Croatia) Jelena Kostanić (semifinals)
5. (Italy) Antonella Serra Zanetti (first round)
6. (Argentina) Mariana Díaz Oliva (second round, retired due to a right thoracic strain)
7. (Slovakia) Martina Suchá (quarterfinals)
8. (Czech Republic) Zuzana Ondrášková (first round, retired due to a right ankle sprain)

== Draw ==
=== Key ===
- Q = Qualifier
- WC = Wild card
- LL = Lucky loser
- Alt = Alternate
- SE = Special exempt
- PR = Protected ranking
- ITF = ITF entry
- JE = Junior exempt
- w/o = Walkover
- r = Retired
- d = Defaulted
- SR = Special ranking

=== Finals ===
Semifinals
1	(Israel) Anna Smashnova	6	6
4	(Croatia) Jelena Kostanić	2	0
(Colombia) Catalina Castaño	6^{6}	6	6
(Spain) Laura Pous Tió	7^{8}	1	0

Final
1	(Israel) Anna Smashnova	6	6
(Colombia) Catalina Castaño	2	2

=== Top half ===
First round
1	(Israel) A Smashnova	6	6
Q	(Spain) L Domínguez Lino	1	2
Q	(Ukraine) O Savchuk	6	3
(Switzerland) E Gagliardi	3	1^{r}
(Tunisia) S Sfar	1	4
(Czech Republic) M Paštiková	6	6
WC	(Hungary) A Kapros	6	3
8	(Czech Republic) Z Ondrášková	4	4^{r}
4	(Croatia) J Kostanić	6	6
(France) É Loit	1	2
(Slovakia) Ľ Cervanová	1	6	6^{1}
(Germany) J Schruff	6	1	7^{7}
(Spain) M Sánchez Lorenzo	4	6	6
WC	(Hungary) Á Szavay	6	2	2
(Czech Republic) E Birnerová	6	6
5	(Italy) An Serra Zanetti	4	1

Second round
1	(Israel) A Smashnova	6	6
Q	(Ukraine) O Savchuk	0	1
(Czech Republic) M Paštiková	6	3	6^{6}
WC	(Hungary) A Kapros	4	6	7^{8}
4	(Croatia) J Kostanić	6	6
(Germany) J Schruff	2	2
(Spain) M Sánchez Lorenzo	6	4	6
(Czech Republic) E Birnerová	2	6	2

Quarterfinals
1	(Israel) A Smashnova	6	6
WC	(Hungary) A Kapros	2	0
4	(Croatia) J Kostanić	4	6	6
(Spain) M Sánchez Lorenzo	6	4	3

Semifinals
1	(Israel) A Smashnova	6	6
4	(Croatia) J Kostanić	2	0

=== Bottom half ===
First round
7	(Slovakia) M Suchá	7	3	6
Q	(Slovakia) K Kachlíková	5	6	2
(Croatia) S Mamić	7	6
(Spain) C Martínez Granados	5	4
LL	(Germany) S Klaschka	6	2	1
(Japan) R Fujiwara	1	6	6
(Colombia) C Castaño	6	1	6
3	(Italy) R Vinci	1	6	4
6	(Argentina) M Díaz Oliva	3	6	6
(Spain) A Parra Santonja	6	4	0
(Spain) L Pous Tió	6	6
(Sweden) H Nooni	1	3
(Russia) E Bychkova	6	6
(Czech Republic) D Chládková	2	2
Q	(France) S Foretz	2	4
2	(Slovenia) K Srebotnik	6	6

Second round
7	(Slovakia) M Suchá	6	6
(Croatia) S Mamić	2	3
(Japan) R Fujiwara	1	2
(Colombia) C Castaño	6	6
6	(Argentina) M Díaz Oliva	5	r
(Spain) L Pous Tió	7
(Russia) E Bychkova	6	6^{11}	3
2	(Slovenia) K Srebotnik	2	7^{13}	6

Quarterfinals
7	(Slovakia) M Suchá	4	3
(Colombia) C Castaño	6	6
(Spain) L Pous Tió	4	6	7^{7}
2	(Slovenia) K Srebotnik	6	1	6^{4}

Semifinals
(Colombia) C Castaño	6^{6}	6	6
(Spain) L Pous Tió	7^{8}	1	0
