= 2003 Tippmix Budapest Grand Prix – Singles =

Singles
- 2003 Tippmix Budapest Grand Prix

Final
- Champion: (Spain) Magüi Serna
- Runner-up: (Australia) Alicia Molik
- Score: 3–6, 7–5, 6–4

Details
- Draw: 32
- Seeds: 8

Events
Singles	Doubles
- Hungarian Ladies Open

Martina Müller was the defending champion from 2001, but lost in the first round.

Magüi Serna won the second straight title in two weeks, having won the 2003 Estoril Open in the previous week.

== Seeds ==
1. (Croatia) Iva Majoli (second round)
2. (Spain) Magüi Serna (champion)
3. (Australia) Alicia Molik (final)
4. (Slovakia) Henrieta Nagyová (first round)
5. (France) Virginie Razzano (second round)
6. (Czech Republic) Klára Koukalová (second round)
7. (Spain) Cristina Torrens Valero (first round)
8. (Italy) Antonella Serra Zanetti (second round)

== Draw ==
Key

- Q = Qualifier
- WC = Wild card
- LL = Lucky loser
- Alt = Alternate
- ITF = ITF entry
- PR = Protected ranking
- SR = Special ranking
- SE = Special exempt
- JE = Junior exempt
- JR = Junior Accelerator Programme entrant
- CO = College Accelerator Programme entrant
- NG = Next Gen Accelerator Program entrant
- w/o = Walkover
- r = Retired
- d = Defaulted

=== Finals ===
Semifinals
(Spain) María Sánchez Lorenzo	4	4
3	(Australia) Alicia Molik	6	6
(Slovakia) Ľudmila Cervanová	3	3
2	(Spain) Magüi Serna	6	6

Final
3	(Australia) Alicia Molik	6	5	4
2	(Spain) Magüi Serna	3	7	6

=== Top half ===
First round
1	(Croatia) I Majoli	3	7	7
LL	(Romania) A Vanc	6	5	5
(Russia) E Kulikovskaia	6	4	0
Q	(Socialist Federal Republic of Yugoslavia) J Janković	1	6	6
(Spain) C Martínez Granados	7	5	3
(Spain) M Sánchez Lorenzo	6^{4}	7	6
WC	(Hungary) Z Gubacsi	2	2
6	(Czech Republic) K Koukalová	6	6
3	(Australia) A Molik	6	6
(Slovakia) M Suchá	1	0
(Switzerland) E Gagliardi	1	2
(France) S Cohen-Aloro	6	6
(Romania) R Dragomir	1	4
Q	(Slovakia) J Gajdošová	6	6
WC	(Hungary) R Kuti-Kis	6	2	1
5	(France) V Razzano	1	6	6

Second round
1	(Croatia) I Majoli
Q	(Socialist Federal Republic of Yugoslavia) J Janković	w/o
(Spain) M Sánchez Lorenzo	6	6
6	(Czech Republic) K Koukalová	3	1
3	(Australia) A Molik	6	6
(France) S Cohen-Aloro	1	2
Q	(Slovakia) J Gajdošová	6	7
5	(France) V Razzano	3	5

Quarterfinals
Q	(Socialist Federal Republic of Yugoslavia) J Janković	4	6	3
(Spain) M Sánchez Lorenzo	6	4	6
3	(Australia) A Molik	6	6
Q	(Slovakia) J Gajdošová	4	3

Semifinals
(Spain) M Sánchez Lorenzo	4	4
3	(Australia) A Molik	6	6

=== Bottom half ===
First round
8	(Italy) An Serra Zanetti	7	7
(Paraguay) R de los Ríos	6^{7}	6^{7}
Q	(Bulgaria) L Bacheva	3	6	4
(Slovakia) Ľ Cervanová	6	2	6
(Czech Republic) I Benešová	6	4	6
(Germany) M Müller	2	6	2
Q	(Argentina) G Dulko	5	6	6
4	(Slovakia) H Nagyová	7	1	2
7	(Spain) C Torrens Valero	2	0
(Hungary) P Mandula	6	6
(Croatia) S Talaja	6	4	3
(Czech Republic) L Průšová	3	6	6
LL	(Hungary) K Marosi	6	6
(Slovakia) Ľ Kurhajcová	4	2
(Germany) A Rösch	4	2
2	(Spain) M Serna	6	6

Second round
8	(Italy) An Serra Zanetti	1	1
(Slovakia) Ľ Cervanová	6	6
(Czech Republic) I Benešová	6	7
Q	(Argentina) G Dulko	3	5
(Hungary) P Mandula	6	5	6
(Czech Republic) L Průšová	3	7	2
LL	(Hungary) K Marosi	7	6^{2}	4
2	(Spain) M Serna	6^{5}	7	6

Quarterfinals
(Slovakia) Ľ Cervanová	7	6
(Czech Republic) I Benešová	5	3
(Hungary) P Mandula	1	2
2	(Spain) M Serna	6	6

Semifinals
(Slovakia) Ľ Cervanová	3	3
2	(Spain) M Serna	6	6
