= 2004 Grand Prix SAR La Princesse Lalla Meryem =

- Date: 5 – 11 April
- Edition: 4th
- Category: Tier V
- Draw: 32S / 16D
- Prize money: $110,000
- Surface: Clay / outdoor
- Location: Casablanca, Morocco

Champions

Singles
- (France) Émilie Loit

Doubles
- (France) Marion Bartoli / (France) Émilie Loit
- Morocco Open

The 2004 Grand Prix SAR La Princesse Lalla Meryem was a women's tennis tournament played on outdoor clay courts in Casablanca, Morocco that was part of the Tier V category of the 2004 WTA Tour. It was the fourth edition of the tournament and was held from 5 April until 11 April 2004. First-seeded Émilie Loit won the singles title and earned $16,000 first-prize money.

== Finals ==
=== Singles ===
(France) Émilie Loit defeated (Slovakia) Ľudmila Cervanová 6–2, 6–2

- It was Loit's first singles title of her career.

=== Doubles ===
(France) Marion Bartoli / (France) Émilie Loit defeated (Belgium) Els Callens / (Slovenia) Katarina Srebotnik 6–4, 6–2
