= 2003 Tippmix Budapest Grand Prix =

- Date: 14–20 April
- Edition: 8th
- Category: Tier V
- Draw: 32S / 16D
- Prize money: $110,000
- Surface: Clay / Outdoor
- Location: Budapest, Hungary

Champions

Singles
- (Spain) Magüi Serna

Doubles
- (Hungary) Petra Mandula / (Ukraine) Elena Tatarkova
← 2002 ·	Hungarian Ladies Open	· 2004 →

The 2003 Tippmix Budapest Grand Prix was a women's tennis tournament played on outdoor clay courts in Budapest, Hungary that was part of the Tier V category of the 2003 WTA Tour. It was the eighth edition of the tournament and was held from 14 April until 20 April 2003. Second-seeded Magüi Serna won the singles title and earned $16,000 first-prize money.

== Finals ==
=== Singles ===
(Spain) Magüi Serna defeated (Australia) Alicia Molik 3–6, 7–5, 6–4

- It was Serna's 2nd singles title of the year and the 3rd of her career.

=== Doubles ===
(Hungary) Petra Mandula / (Ukraine) Elena Tatarkova defeated (Spain) Conchita Martínez Granados / (Ukraine) Tatiana Perebiynis 6–3, 6–1
