= 2004 Tippmix Budapest Grand Prix =

- Date: 26 April – 2 May
- Edition: 9th
- Category: Tier V
- Draw: 32S / 16D
- Prize money: $110,000
- Surface: Clay / Outdoor
- Location: Budapest, Hungary

Champions

Singles
- (Federal Republic of Yugoslavia) Jelena Janković

Doubles
- (Hungary) Petra Mandula / (Austria) Barbara Schett
← 2003 ·	Hungarian Ladies Open	· 2005 →

The 2004 Tippmix Budapest Grand Prix was a women's tennis tournament played on outdoor clay courts in Budapest, Hungary that was part of the Tier V category of the 2004 WTA Tour. It was the ninth edition of the tournament and was held from 26 April until 2 May 2004. Eighth-seeded Jelena Janković won the singles title and earned $16,000 first-prize money.

== Finals ==
=== Singles ===
(Federal Republic of Yugoslavia) Jelena Janković defeated (Slovakia) Martina Suchá 7–6^{(7–4)}, 6–3

- It was Janković's first singles title of her career.

=== Doubles ===
(Hungary) Petra Mandula / (Austria) Barbara Schett defeated (Hungary) Virág Németh / (Hungary) Ágnes Szávay 6–3, 6–2
