= 2001 Grand Prix SAR La Princesse Lalla Meryem – Singles =

Singles
- 2001 Grand Prix SAR La Princesse Lalla Meryem

Final
- Champion: (Hungary) Zsófia Gubacsi
- Runner-up: (Italy) Maria Elena Camerin
- Score: 1–6, 6–3, 7–6^{(7–5)}

Details
- Draw: 32 (2WC/4Q)
- Seeds: 8

Events
Singles	Doubles
Morocco Open	· 2002 →

In the first edition of the tournament, Zsófia Gubacsi won the title by defeating Maria Elena Camerin 1–6, 6–3, 7–6^{(7–5)} in the final.

== Seeds ==
1. (Spain) ~~Magüi Serna~~ (withdrew)
2. (Spain) Marta Marrero (first round)
3. (Germany) Bianka Lamade (first round)
4. (Spain) María José Martínez Sánchez (second round)
5. (Slovakia) Ľudmila Cervanová (first round)
6. (Switzerland) Emmanuelle Gagliardi (second round)
7. (Switzerland) Miroslava Vavrinec (first round)
8. (Germany) Anca Barna (quarterfinals)
9. (Spain) Nuria Llagostera Vives (first round)

== Draw ==
=== Key ===
- Q = Qualifier
- WC = Wild card
- LL = Lucky loser
- Alt = Alternate
- SE = Special exempt
- PR = Protected ranking
- ITF = ITF entry
- JE = Junior exempt
- w/o = Walkover
- r = Retired
- d = Defaulted
- SR = Special ranking

=== Finals ===
Semifinals
(France) Émilie Loit	4	5
(Italy) Maria Elena Camerin	6	7
(Hungary) Anikó Kapros	4	2
(Hungary) Zsófia Gubacsi	6	6

Final
(Italy) Maria Elena Camerin	6	3	6^{5}
(Hungary) Zsófia Gubacsi	1	6	7^{7}

=== Top half ===
First round
3	(Germany) B Lamade	1	5
(Slovakia) M Suchá	6	7
(Netherlands) K Boogert	6	6^{4}	5^{r}
WC	(Morocco) H Ifrakh	4	7^{7}	5
Q	(Argentina) V Krauth	1	2
(Argentina) C Fernández	6	6
(France) É Loit	7	6
7	(Switzerland) M Vavrinec	5	2
5	(Slovakia) Ľ Cervanová	6^{3}	6	4
(Italy) ME Camerin	7^{7}	4	6
(Czech Republic) K Koukalová	1	6	6
(Hungary) K Nagy	6	2	0
(Sweden) Å Carlsson	1	6^{4}
WC	(Morocco) B Mouhtassine	6	7^{7}
Q	(United States) T Dabek	5	3
8	(Germany) A Barna	7	6

Second round
(Slovakia) M Suchá	6	6
WC	(Morocco) H Ifrakh	1	2
(Argentina) C Fernández	6^{2}	3
(France) É Loit	7^{7}	6
(Italy) ME Camerin	6	7^{7}
(Czech Republic) K Koukalová	2	6^{3}
WC	(Morocco) B Mouhtassine	4	6	1
8	(Germany) A Barna	6	1	6

Quarterfinals
(Slovakia) M Suchá	3	2
(France) É Loit	6	6
(Italy) ME Camerin	6	6
8	(Germany) A Barna	4	3

Semifinals
(France) É Loit	4	5
(Italy) ME Camerin	6	7

=== Bottom half ===
First round
9	(Spain) N LLagostera Vives	5	2
(Czech Republic) L Němečková	7	6
(Bulgaria) L Bacheva	2	6	7^{7}
Q	(Federal Republic of Yugoslavia) A Timotić	6	2	6^{2}
(Hungary) A Kapros	4	6	7^{7}
(Greece) E Daniilidou	6	3	6^{4}
(Germany) M Schnitzer	3	6	3
4	(Spain) MJ Martínez Sánchez	6	3	6
6	(Switzerland) E Gagliardi	6	6
Q	(Latvia) L Dekmeijere	4	1
(Czech Republic) A Vašková	7	1	2
(Argentina) ME Salerni	5	6	6
(Spain) E Bes	6	5	6
(Madagascar) D Randriantefy	4	7	2
(Hungary) Z Gubacsi	4	7^{8}	6
2	(Spain) M Marrero	6	6^{6}	0

Second round
(Czech Republic) L Němečková	6	6
(Bulgaria) L Bacheva	4	2
(Hungary) A Kapros	7^{7}	1	6
4	(Spain) MJ Martínez Sánchez	6^{2}	6	3
6	(Switzerland) E Gagliardi	6	0	3
(Argentina) ME Salerni	2	6	6
(Spain) E Bes	1	3
(Hungary) Z Gubacsi	6	6

Quarterfinals
(Czech Republic) L Němečková	4	2
(Hungary) A Kapros	6	6
(Argentina) ME Salerni	6	4	6^{2}
(Hungary) Z Gubacsi	0	6	7^{7}

Semifinals
(Hungary) A Kapros	4	2
(Hungary) Z Gubacsi	6	6
