= 2001 Colortex Budapest Grand Prix – Doubles =

Doubles
- 2001 Colortex Budapest Grand Prix

Final
- Champions: (Italy) Tathiana Garbin (Slovakia) Janette Husárová
- Runners-up: (Hungary) Zsófia Gubacsi (Federal Republic of Yugoslavia) Dragana Zarić
- Score: 6–1, 6–3

Events
Singles	Doubles
← 2000 ·	Hungarian Ladies Open	· 2002 →

Lubomira Bacheva and Cristina Torrens Valero were the defending champions but lost in the first round to Laurence Courtois and Elena Tatarkova.

Tathiana Garbin and Janette Husárová won in the final 6–1, 6–3 against Zsófia Gubacsi and Dragana Zarić.

== Seeds ==
Champion seeds are indicated in bold text while text in italics indicates the round in which those seeds were eliminated.

1. (France) Alexandra Fusai / (Italy) Rita Grande (quarterfinals)
2. (Italy) **Tathiana Garbin** / (Slovakia) **Janette Husárová (champions)**
3. (Netherlands) Kristie Boogert / (Netherlands) Miriam Oremans (quarterfinals)
4. (Slovakia) Karina Habšudová / (Bulgaria) Magdalena Maleeva (first round)

== Draw ==
=== Key ===
- Q = Qualifier
- WC = Wild card
- LL = Lucky loser
- Alt = Alternate
- SE = Special exempt
- PR = Protected ranking
- ITF = ITF entry
- JE = Junior exempt
- w/o = Walkover
- r = Retired
- d = Defaulted
- SR = Special ranking

First round
1	(France) **A Fusai** (Italy) **R Grande**	**6**	**6**
(Italy) G Casoni (Switzerland) E Gagliardi	3	3
(Bulgaria) L Bacheva (Spain) C Torrens Valero	3	2
(Belgium) **L Courtois** (Ukraine) **E Tatarkova**	**6**	**6**
3	(Netherlands) **K Boogert** (Netherlands) **M Oremans**	**6**	**6**
WC	(Hungary) A Kapros (Hungary) R Kuti-Kis	1	3
Q	(Hungary) **Z Gubacsi** (Federal Republic of Yugoslavia) **D Zarić**	**6**	1	**6**
(Spain) A Medina Garrigues (Spain) M Sánchez Lorenzo	4	**6**	1
(Slovenia) M Matevžič (Slovenia) P Rampre	3	4
(Denmark) **E Dyrberg** (South Africa) **K Grant**	**6**	**6**
(Hungary) **P Mandula** (Hungary) **K Marosi-Aracama**	**7**	**7**
4	(Slovakia) K Habšudová (Bulgaria) M Maleeva	5	5
(Spain) **G Riera** (Germany) **E Wagner**	5	**6**	**7**
(Croatia) J Kostanić (Federal Republic of Yugoslavia) S Načuk	**7**	2	5
(France) É Loit (France) V Razzano	2	4
2	(Italy) **T Garbin** (Slovakia) **J Husárová**	**6**	**6**

Quarterfinals
1	(France) A Fusai (Italy) R Grande	1	2
(Belgium) **L Courtois** (Ukraine) **E Tatarkova**	**6**	**6**
3	(Netherlands) K Boogert (Netherlands) M Oremans	4	4
Q	(Hungary) **Z Gubacsi** (Federal Republic of Yugoslavia) **D Zarić**	**6**	**6**
(Denmark) E Dyrberg (South Africa) K Grant	5	2
(Hungary) **P Mandula** (Hungary) **K Marosi-Aracama**	**7**	**6**
(Spain) G Riera (Germany) E Wagner	3	3
2	(Italy) **T Garbin** (Slovakia) **J Husárová**	**6**	**6**

Semifinals
(Belgium) L Courtois (Ukraine) E Tatarkova	4	2
Q	(Hungary) **Z Gubacsi** (Federal Republic of Yugoslavia) **D Zarić**	**6**	**6**
(Hungary) P Mandula (Hungary) K Marosi-Aracama	2	1
2	(Italy) **T Garbin** (Slovakia) **J Husárová**	**6**	**6**

Final
Q	(Hungary) Zsófia Gubacsi (Federal Republic of Yugoslavia) Dragana Zarić	1	3
2	(Italy) **Tathiana Garbin** (Slovakia) **Janette Husárová**	**6**	**6**
