= 2001 Grand Prix SAR La Princesse Lalla Meryem – Doubles =

Doubles
- 2001 Grand Prix SAR La Princesse Lalla Meryem

Final
- Champions: (Bulgaria) Lubomira Bacheva (Sweden) Åsa Carlsson
- Runners-up: (Spain) María José Martínez Sánchez (Argentina) María Emilia Salerni
- Score: 6–3, 6–7^{(4–7)}, 6–1

Events
Singles	Doubles
Morocco Open	· 2002 →

In the first edition of the tournament, Lubomira Bacheva and Åsa Carlsson won the title by defeating María José Martínez Sánchez and María Emilia Salerni 6–3, 6–7^{(4–7)}, 6–1 in the final.

== Seeds ==
1. (Bulgaria) Lubomira Bacheva / (Sweden) Åsa Carlsson (champions)
2. (Germany) Bianka Lamade / (France) Émilie Loit (first round)
3. (Spain) María José Martínez Sánchez / (Argentina) María Emilia Salerni (final)
4. (Switzerland) Emmanuelle Gagliardi / (Czech Republic) Lenka Němečková (semifinals)

== Draw ==
=== Key ===
- Q = Qualifier
- WC = Wild card
- LL = Lucky loser
- Alt = Alternate
- SE = Special exempt
- PR = Protected ranking
- ITF = ITF entry
- JE = Junior exempt
- w/o = Walkover
- r = Retired
- d = Defaulted
- SR = Special ranking

=== Draw ===
First round
1	(Bulgaria) L Bacheva (Sweden) Å Carlsson	7	6
Q	(Greece) E Daniilidou (Spain) M Marrero	5	4
(New Zealand) L Baker (India) M Malhotra	1	6	7
(Spain) N Llagostera Vives (South Africa) N van der Merwe	6	2	5
4	(Switzerland) E Gagliardi (Czech Republic) L Němečková	6	6
WC	(Morocco) B Mouhtassine (Switzerland) M Vavrinec	1	1
(Slovenia) M Vesenjak (Slovenia) U Vesenjak	4	1
(Germany) M Kochta (Czech Republic) A Vašková	6	6
(Spain) E Bes (Spain) G Riera	1	6	7^{7}
(Argentina) E Krauth (Argentina) V Krauth	6	1	6^{1}
(Australia) J Belobradjic (Russia) I Kornienko	1	2
3	(Spain) MJ Martínez Sánchez (Argentina) ME Salerni	6	6
(Italy) ME Camerin (Italy) M Scartoni	6	1	7
(United States) T Dabek (Latvia) L Dekmeijere	4	6	5
(Germany) A Barna (New Zealand) S Stephens	6	3	6
2	(Germany) B Lamade (France) É Loit	2	6	4

Quarterfinals
1	(Bulgaria) L Bacheva (Sweden) Å Carlsson	6	7
(New Zealand) L Baker (India) M Malhotra	3	5
4	(Switzerland) E Gagliardi (Czech Republic) L Němečková	6	7
(Germany) M Kochta (Czech Republic) A Vašková	2	5
(Spain) E Bes (Spain) G Riera	3	2
3	(Spain) MJ Martínez Sánchez (Argentina) ME Salerni	6	6
(Italy) ME Camerin (Italy) M Scartoni	5	4
(Germany) A Barna (New Zealand) S Stephens	7	6

Semifinals
1	(Bulgaria) L Bacheva (Sweden) Å Carlsson	1	6	6
4	(Switzerland) E Gagliardi (Czech Republic) L Němečková	6	2	2
3	(Spain) MJ Martínez Sánchez (Argentina) ME Salerni	6	7^{7}
(Germany) A Barna (New Zealand) S Stephens	3	6^{4}

Final
1	(Bulgaria) L Bacheva (Sweden) Å Carlsson	6	6^{4}	6
3	(Spain) MJ Martínez Sánchez (Argentina) ME Salerni	3	7^{7}	1
