= 2005 Tippmix Budapest Grand Prix =

- Date: 25–31 July
- Edition: 10th
- Category: Tier IV
- Draw: 32S / 16D
- Prize money: $140,000
- Surface: Clay / outdoor
- Location: Budapest, Hungary

Champions

Singles
- (Israel) Anna Smashnova

Doubles
- (France) Émilie Loit / (Slovenia) Katarina Srebotnik
| ← 2004 · | Hungarian Ladies Open | · 2006 → |

The 2005 Tippmix Budapest Grand Prix was a women's tennis tournament played on outdoor clay courts in Budapest, Hungary that was part of the Tier IV category of the 2005 WTA Tour. It was the tenth edition of the tournament and was held from 25 July until 31 July 2005. First-seeded Anna Smashnova won the singles title and earned $22,000 first-prize money.

== Finals ==
=== Singles ===
(Israel) Anna Smashnova defeated (Colombia) Catalina Castaño 6–2, 6–2

- It was Smashnova's 2nd singles title of the year and the 11th of her career.

=== Doubles ===
(France) Émilie Loit / (Slovenia) Katarina Srebotnik defeated (Spain) Lourdes Domínguez Lino / (Spain) Marta Marrero 6–1, 3–6, 6–2
