= 2006 Budapest Grand Prix =

- Date: 24–30 July
- Edition: 11th
- Category: Tier IV
- Draw: 32S / 16D
- Prize money: $145,000
- Surface: Clay / Outdoor
- Location: Budapest, Hungary

Champions

Singles
- (Israel) Anna Smashnova

Doubles
- (Slovakia) Janette Husárová / (Netherlands) Michaëlla Krajicek
← 2005 ·	Hungarian Ladies Open	· 2007 →

The 2006 Budapest Grand Prix was a women's tennis tournament played on outdoor clay courts in Budapest, Hungary that was part of the Tier IV category of the 2006 WTA Tour. It was the 11th edition of the tournament and was held from 24 July until 30 July 2006. Eighth-seeded Anna Smashnova won the singles title and earned $22,900 first-prize money.

== Finals ==
=== Singles ===
(Israel) Anna Smashnova defeated (Spain) Lourdes Domínguez Lino 6–1, 6–3

- It was Smashnova's only singles title of the year and the 12th and last of her career.

=== Doubles ===
(Slovakia) Janette Husárová / (Netherlands) Michaëlla Krajicek defeated (Spain) Lucie Hradecká / (Czechoslovakia) Renata Voráčová 4–6, 6–4, 6–4
