= 2001 Colortex Budapest Grand Prix – Singles =

Singles
- 2001 Colortex Budapest Grand Prix

Final
- Champion: (Bulgaria) Magdalena Maleeva
- Runner-up: (Luxembourg) Anne Kremer
- Score: 3–6, 6–2, 6–4

Details
- Draw: 32
- Seeds: 8

Events
Singles	Doubles
← 2000 ·	Hungarian Ladies Open	· 2002 →

Tathiana Garbin was the defending champion but lost in the second round to Émilie Loit.

Top-seeded Magdalena Maleeva won in the final 3–6, 6–2, 6–4 against Anne Kremer.

== Seeds ==
1. (Bulgaria) Magdalena Maleeva (champion)
2. (Luxembourg) Anne Kremer (final)
3. (Italy) Tathiana Garbin (second round)
4. (Spain) Ángeles Montolio (quarterfinals)
5. (Italy) Rita Grande (first round)
6. (Hungary) Rita Kuti-Kis (second round)
7. (Spain) Marta Marrero (first round)
8. n/a

== Draw ==
=== Key ===
- Q = Qualifier
- WC = Wild card
- LL = Lucky loser
- Alt = Alternate
- SE = Special exempt
- PR = Protected ranking
- ITF = ITF entry
- JE = Junior exempt
- w/o = Walkover
- r = Retired
- d = Defaulted
- SR = Special ranking

First round
1	(Bulgaria) M Maleeva	6	5	6
(Italy) G Casoni	2	7	4
(Czech Republic) A Gerši	6	6
(Slovakia) K Habšudová	4	4
(Italy) F Schiavone	6	6
(Spain) M Sánchez Lorenzo	2	1
(Netherlands) M Oremans	6	6
7	(Spain) M Marrero	4	4
4	(Spain) Á Montolio	6	6
(United States) D Buth	3	3
Q	(Czech Republic) A Vašková	0	5
(Czech Republic) D Chládková	6	7
(Switzerland) M Vavrinec	6	7
(Federal Republic of Yugoslavia) S Načuk	1	5
(Spain) C Torrens Valero	4	6	6
5	(Italy) R Grande	6	3	2
LL	(Belgium) L Courtois	6^{3}	3
Q	(France) S Foretz	7^{7}	6
WC	(Hungary) A Kapros	6	6
(Netherlands) K Boogert	2	3
(Bulgaria) L Bacheva	1	2
(France) É Loit	6	6
(Spain) A Medina Garrigues	1	2
3	(Italy) T Garbin	6	6
6	(Hungary) R Kuti-Kis	6	5	7^{7}
(Switzerland) E Gagliardi	3	7	6^{4}
Q	(Hungary) P Mandula	4	6	7^{7}
(Spain) N Llagostera	6	2	6^{4}
Q	(Hungary) K Nagy	2	1
(France) S Pitkowski	6	6
WC	(Hungary) K Marosi-Aracama	6	2	5
2	(Luxembourg) A Kremer	4	6	7

Second round
1	(Bulgaria) M Maleeva	6	6
(Czech Republic) A Gerši	1	1
(Italy) F Schiavone	3	6	6
(Netherlands) M Oremans	6	3	4
4	(Spain) Á Montolio	6	1	7
(Czech Republic) D Chládková	0	6	5
(Switzerland) M Vavrinec	3	0
(Spain) C Torrens Valero	6	6
Q	(France) S Foretz	6	2	3
WC	(Hungary) A Kapros	1	6	6
(France) É Loit	6	6
3	(Italy) T Garbin	4	3
6	(Hungary) R Kuti-Kis	3	6	2
Q	(Hungary) P Mandula	6	4	6
(France) S Pitkowski	6^{4}	6	4
2	(Luxembourg) A Kremer	7^{7}	3	6

Quarterfinals
1	(Bulgaria) M Maleeva	6	7
(Italy) F Schiavone	2	5
4	(Spain) Á Montolio	1	1
(Spain) C Torrens Valero	6	6
WC	(Hungary) A Kapros	4	6	6
(France) É Loit	6	1	1
Q	(Hungary) P Mandula	6	6^{5}	4
2	(Luxembourg) A Kremer	2	7^{7}	6

Semifinals
1	(Bulgaria) M Maleeva	6	7
(Spain) C Torrens Valero	2	5
WC	(Hungary) A Kapros	1	5
2	(Luxembourg) A Kremer	6	7

Final
1	(Bulgaria) M Maleeva	3	6	6
2	(Luxembourg) Anne Kremer	6	2	4
