= 2003 Grand Prix SAR La Princesse Lalla Meryem =

- Date: 31 March – 6 April
- Edition: 3rd
- Category: Tier V
- Draw: 32S / 16D
- Prize money: $110,000
- Surface: Clay / outdoor
- Location: Casablanca, Morocco

Champions

Singles
- (Italy) Rita Grande

Doubles
- (Argentina) Gisela Dulko / (Argentina) María Emilia Salerni
- Morocco Open

The 2003 Grand Prix SAR La Princesse Lalla Meryem was a women's tennis tournament played on outdoor clay courts in Casablanca, Morocco that was part of the Tier V category of the 2003 WTA Tour. It was the third edition of the tournament and was held from 31 March until 6 April 2003. Second-seeded Rita Grande won the singles title and earned $16,000 first-prize money.

== Finals ==
=== Singles ===
(Italy) Rita Grande defeated (Italy) Antonella Serra Zanetti 6–2, 4–6, 6–1

- It was Grande's 1st singles title of her the year and the 3rd of her career.

=== Doubles ===
(Argentina) Gisela Dulko / (Argentina) María Emilia Salerni defeated (Slovakia) Henrieta Nagyová / (Ukraine) Elena Tatarkova 6–3, 6–4
