= Myriam Casanova =

Swiss tennis player

- Country (sports): Switzerland
- Residence: Altstätten, Switzerland
- Born: 20 June 1985 (age 40) Altstätten
- Height: 1.72 m (5 ft 7 1/2 in)
- Turned pro: 2000
- Retired: 2012
- Plays: Right (two-handed backhand)
- Prize money: $469,516

Singles
- Career record: 116–63
- Career titles: 1 WTA, 7 ITF
- Highest ranking: No. 45 (7 April 2003)

Grand Slam singles results
- Australian Open: 1R (2003, 2004)
- French Open: 3R (2004)
- Wimbledon: 3R (2002)
- US Open: 2R (2002, 2003)

Doubles
- Career record: 48–31
- Career titles: 3 ITF
- Highest ranking: No. 19 (5 July 2004)

Myriam Casanova (born 20 June 1985) is a former tennis player from Switzerland.

She was ranked as high as No. 45 on the WTA Tour in singles and won one WTA singles title in her career. In doubles, she reached the semi-finals of the 2003 US Open, partnering Marion Bartoli of France, and achieved a career-high ranking of world No. 19.

== WTA career finals ==
=== Singles: 2 (1 title, 1 runner-up) ===
Legend Grand Slam tournaments (0–0) Tier I (0–0) Tier II (0–0) Tier III, IV & V (1–1)	Finals by surface Hard (0–0) Clay (0–2) Grass (0–0) Carpet (0–0)

Result	W–L	Date	Tournament	Tier	Surface	Opponent	Score
Loss	0–1	Apr 2002	Budapest, Hungary	Tier IV	Clay	(Germany) Martina Müller	2–6, 6–3, 4–6
Win	1–1	Jul 2002	Knokke-Heist, Belgium	Tier IV	Clay	(Spain) Arantxa Sánchez Vicario	4–6, 6–2, 6–1

=== Doubles: 2 (2 runner-ups) ===
Winner — Legend
Grand Slam (0–0)
Tier I (0–0)
Tier II (0–1)
Tier III (0–1)
Tier IV & V (0–0)

Result	No.	Date	Tournament	Surface	Partner	Opponents	Score
Loss	1.	Feb 2004	Antwerp, Belgium	Hard	(Greece) Eleni Daniilidou	(Zimbabwe) Cara Black (Belgium) Els Callens	2–6, 1–6
Loss	2.	Apr 2004	Amelia Island, United States	Clay	(Australia) Alicia Molik	(Russia) Nadia Petrova (United States) Meghann Shaughnessy	6–3, 2–6, 5–7

== ITF finals ==
$100,000 tournaments
$75,000 tournaments
$50,000 tournaments
$25,000 tournaments
$10,000 tournaments

=== Singles (7–0) ===
Result	No.	Date	Tournament	Surface	Opponent	Score
Win	1.	10 September 2000	Zadar, Croatia	Clay	(Slovakia) Zuzana Kučová	6–4, 6–1
Win	2.	6 May 2001	Nitra, Slovakia	Clay	(Russia) Anna Bastrikova	6–1, 6–3
Win	3.	30 September 2001	Belgrade, Serbia	Clay	(Germany) Antonela Voina	7–5, 6–0
Win	4.	7 October 2001	Novi Sad, Serbia	Clay	(Switzerland) Daniela Casanova	6–4, 7–5
Win	5.	16 June 2002	Vaduz, Liechtenstein	Clay	(South Africa) Chanelle Scheepers	6–1, 6–3
Win	6.	27 June 2010	Davos, Switzerland	Clay	(Russia) Viktoria Kamenskaya	6–3, 4–6, 6–4
Win	7.	20 March 2011	Fällanden, Switzerland	Carpet (i)	(Latvia) Diāna Marcinkēviča	6–3, 6–4

=== Doubles (3–1) ===
Result	No.	Date	Tournament	Surface	Partner	Opponents	Score
Loss	1.	11 June 2001	Vaduz, Liechtenstein	Clay	(Switzerland) Daniela Casanova	(Germany) Susi Bensch (Germany) Sabrina Jolk	6–7, 5–7
Win	2.	17 September 2001	Zadar, Croatia	Clay	(Switzerland) Daniela Casanova	(Czech Republic) Barbora Machovska (Czech Republic) Sarka Snorova	6–2, 6–2
Win	3.	30 September 2001	Belgrade, Serbia	Clay	(Switzerland) Daniela Casanova	(Federal Republic of Yugoslavia) Dragana Ilić (Federal Republic of Yugoslavia) Ljiljana Nanušević	6–2, 7–5
Win	4.	7 October 2001	Novi Sad, Serbia	Clay	(Switzerland) Daniela Casanova	(Federal Republic of Yugoslavia) Ana Cetnik (Federal Republic of Yugoslavia) Ljiljana Nanušević	6–1, 6–1
