= Martina Müller (tennis) =

German tennis player

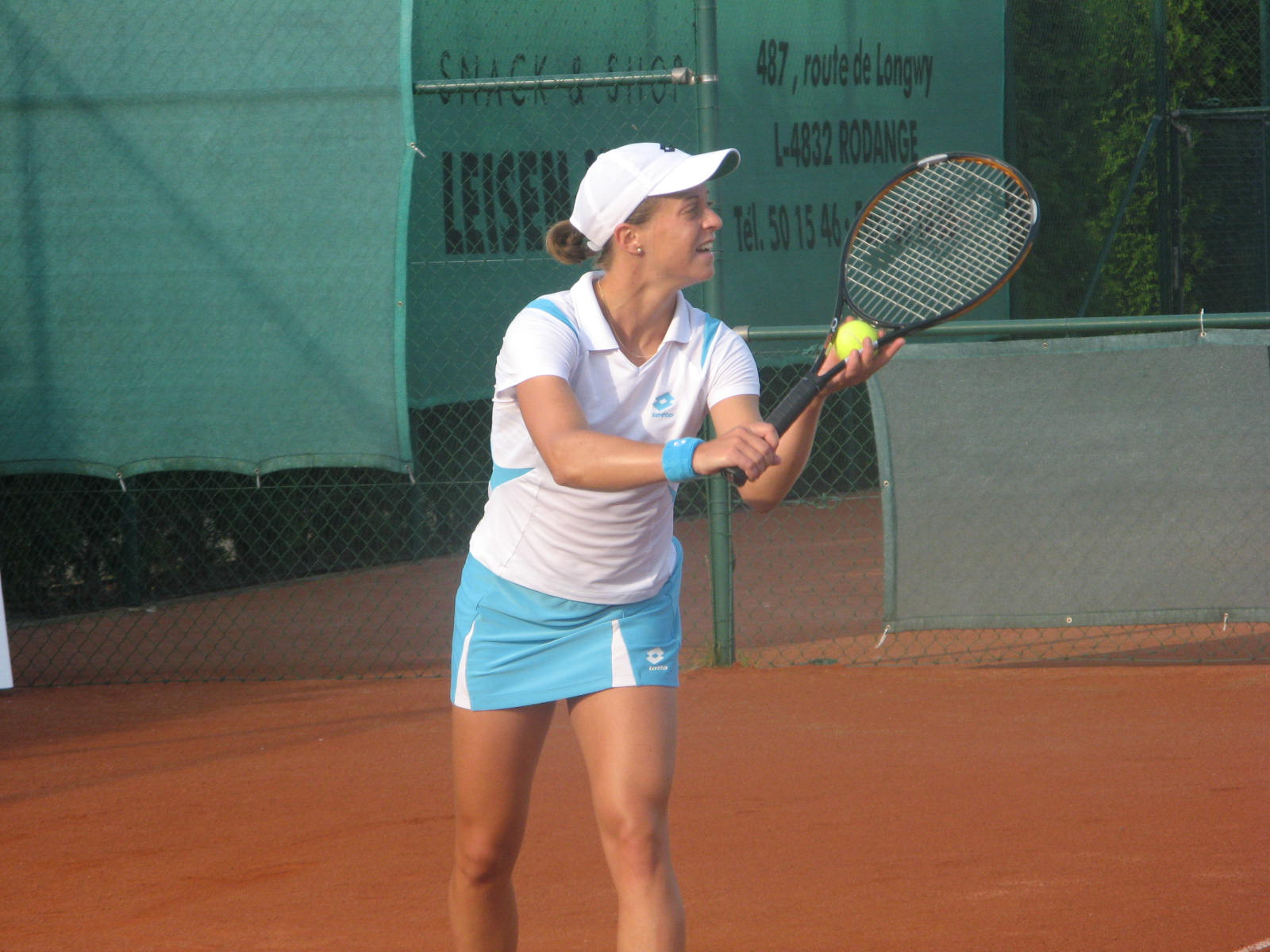
- Country (sports): Germany
- Residence: Sehnde
- Born: 11 October 1982 (age 42); Hanover, West Germany
- Height: 1.65 m (5 ft 5 in)
- Turned pro: 1999
- Retired: 2011
- Plays: Right-handed (two-handed backhand)
- Prize money: $1,040,531

Singles
- Career record: 288–255
- Career titles: 1 WTA, 10 ITF
- Highest ranking: No. 33 (2 April 2007)

Grand Slam singles results
- Australian Open: 2R (2002, 2006, 2007)
- French Open: 2R (2002, 2006, 2007)
- Wimbledon: 2R (2006, 2007)
- US Open: 3R (2002)

Doubles
- Career record: 158–167
- Career titles: 1 WTA, 10 ITF
- Highest ranking: No. 47 (25 February 2008)

Team competitions
- Fed Cup: 4–8

Martina Müller-Skibbe (German pronunciation: [maʁˈtiːna ˈmʏlɐ]; born 11 October 1982) is a former professional tennis player from Germany. She won one singles title and one doubles title on the WTA tour.

== Career ==
Coached by her father, Reinhard Müller, Martina had her best results on clay courts: she won her only WTA Tour singles title at the Budapest Grand Prix and a WTA Tour doubles title in 's-Hertogenbosch on grass. On the ITF Women's Circuit, she won ten singles and ten doubles titles. On 2 April 2007, she reached a career-high WTA ranking of 33. In February 2008, she peaked at No. 47 in the WTA doubles rankings.

In 2007, she started the year with middling results, reaching the second round at the Australian Open, losing to Elena Dementieva in three sets. From January to April, Müller never came past the second round of a tournament. In May, at the German Open in Berlin, she defeated Eleni Daniilidou and 13th seed Shahar Pe'er to reach the round of 16 where she lost to Svetlana Kuznetsova 3–6, 2–6. She reached the second round of Roland Garros, losing to Dominika Cibulková, and the second round at Wimbledon, retiring against Agnieszka Radwańska. In the previous round, Müller double-bageled Anna Smashnova. She reached the final at the Palermo Ladies Open, before being defeated by Hungarian Ágnes Szávay in two sets.

Müller married longtime boyfriend Florian Skibbe in August 2011 and subsequently announced her retirement.

== WTA Tour finals ==
=== Singles: 2 (1 title, 1 runner-up) ===
Winner - Legend
Grand Slam tournaments
Tier I (0–0)
Tier II (0–0)
Tier III (0–0)
Tier IV & V (1–1)

Result	No.	Date	Tournament	Surface	Opponent	Score
Win	1.	Apr 2002	Budapest, Hungary	Clay	(Switzerland) Myriam Casanova	6–2, 3–6, 6–4
Loss	1.	Jul 2007	Palermo, Italy	Clay	(Hungary) Ágnes Szávay	0–6, 1–6

=== Doubles: 5 (1 title, 4 runner-ups) ===
Winner - Legend
Grand Slam tournaments
Tier I (0–0)
Tier II (0–0)
Tier III (0–3)
Tier IV & V (1–1)

Result	No.	Date	Tournament	Surface	Partner	Opponents	Score
Win	1.	Jun 2002	's-Hertogenbosch, Netherlands	Grass	(Australia) Catherine Barclay-Reitz	(Germany) Bianka Lamade (Bulgaria) Magdalena Maleeva	6–4, 7–5
Loss	1.	May 2006	Strasbourg, France	Clay	(Romania) Andreea Ehritt-Vanc	(South Africa) Liezel Huber (United States) Martina Navratilova	2–6, 6–7^{(1–7)}
Loss	2.	Apr 2007	Budapest Grand Prix, Hungary	Clay	(Czech Republic) Gabriela Chmelinová	(Hungary) Ágnes Szávay (Czech Republic) Vladimíra Uhlířová	5–7, 2–6
Loss	3.	Jan 2008	Auckland, New Zealand	Hard	(Czech Republic) Barbora Strýcová	(United States) Lilia Osterloh (Russia) Mariya Koryttseva	3–6, 4–6
Loss	4.	Feb 2008	Bogotá, Colombia	Clay	(Croatia) Jelena Kostanić Tošić	(Czech Republic) Iveta Benešová (United States) Bethanie Mattek-Sands	3–6, 3–6

== ITF Circuit finals ==
Legend
$75,000 tournaments
$50,000 tournaments
$25,000 tournaments
$10,000 tournaments

=== Singles (10–7) ===
Result	No.	Date	Location	Surface	Opponent	Score
Win	1.	13 June 1999	Meinerzhagen, Germany	Clay	(Germany) Lydia Steinbach	6–0, 6–2
Loss	1.	15 August 1999	Rebecq, Belgium	Clay	(Belgium) Daphne van de Zande	3–6, 6–3, 4–6
Win	2.	28 January 2001	Båstad, Sweden	Hard (i)	(Estonia) Margit Rüütel	6–2, 6–0
Loss	2.	15 April 2001	San Luis Potosi, Mexico	Clay	(Italy) Maria Elena Camerin	4–6, 5–7
Loss	3.	19 August 2001	Bronx, United States	Hard	(Austria) Barbara Schwartz	7–5, 3–6, 6–7^{(3–7)}
Win	3.	25 January 2004	Grenoble, France	Hard (i)	(France) Aravane Rezaï	7–5, 6–1
Loss	4.	5 April 2004	Patras, Greece	Hard	(Belarus) Ekaterina Dzehalevich	4–6, 4–6
Win	4.	2 May 2004	Taranto, Italy	Clay	(Russia) Nina Bratchikova	6–3, 6–2
Loss	5.	20 June 2004	Gorizia, Italy	Clay	(Argentina) Vanina García Sokol	1–6, 4–6
Win	5.	4 July 2004	Stuttgart, Germany	Clay	(Italy) Nathalie Viérin	6–2, 7–5
Win	6.	17 April 2005	Biarritz, France	Clay	(Switzerland) Timea Bacsinszky	4–6, 7–6^{(7–2)}, 6–2
Loss	6.	9 April 2006	Athens, Greece	Clay	(France) Aurélie Védy	6–4, 2–6, 4–6
Win	7.	16 April 2006	Civitavecchia, Italy	Clay	(Denmark) Caroline Wozniacki	6–1, 6–1
Win	8.	30 April 2006	Cagnes-sur-Mer, France	Clay	(Belarus) Anastasiya Yakimova	7–6^{(8–6)}, 2–6, 6–0
Win	9.	6 August 2006	Baden-Baden, Germany	Clay	(Czech Republic) Kateřina Böhmová	6–1, 6–1
Win	10.	17 September 2006	Bordeaux, France	Clay	(Germany) Sandra Klösel	6–3, 6–2
Loss	7.	29 July 2007	Pétange, Luxembourg	Clay	(France) Pauline Parmentier	1–6, 4–6

=== Doubles (10–7) ===
Result	No.	Date	Location	Surface	Partner	Opponents	Score
Win	1.	2 August 2003	Harrisonburg, US	Hard	(South Africa) Surina De Beer	(Brazil) Ana Maria Moura (United States) Danielle Wiggins	6–2, 7–6^{(4)}
Loss	2.	21 September 2003	Biella, Italy	Clay	(Czech Republic) Lenka Němečková	(Slovakia) Ľubomíra Kurhajcová (Czech Republic) Libuše Průšová	2–6, 4–6
Loss	3.	26 October 2003	Rockhampton, Australia	Hard	(South Africa) Natalie Grandin	(Australia) Trudi Musgrave (United States) Abigail Spears	1–6, 5–7
Win	4.	25 January 2004	Grenoble, France	Hard (i)	(Germany) Stefanie Weis	(Germany) Antonia Matic (Slovakia) Lenka Tvarošková	6–2, 6–1
Loss	5.	15 February 2004	Sunderland, UK	Hard (i)	(United Kingdom) Helen Crook	(Republic of Ireland) Claire Curran (Netherlands) Kim Kilsdonk	4–6, 6–3, 3–6
Win	6.	22 March 2004	Athens, Greece	Hard	(Latvia) Līga Dekmeijere	(Hungary) Zsófia Gubacsi (Hungary) Kira Nagy	6–2, 1–6, 6–4
Win	7.	5 April 2004	Patras, Greece	Hard	(Czech Republic) Vladimíra Uhlířová	(United Kingdom) Chantal Coombs (United Kingdom) Emily Webley-Smith	7–6^{(7)}, 6–3
Loss	8.	25 April 2004	Bari, Italy	Clay	(Czech Republic) Vladimíra Uhlířová	(Spain) Rosa María Andrés Rodríguez (Spain) Conchita Martínez Granados	2–6, 7–5, 2-6
Loss	9.	19 June 2004	Gorizia, Italy	Carpet (i)	(Germany) Angelika Rösch	(Romania) Ruxandra Dragomir (Romania) Andreea Ehritt-Vanc	6–7^{(4)}, 2–6
Loss	10.	22 June 2004	Fontanafredda, Italy	Clay	(Czech Republic) Vladimíra Uhlířová	(Argentina) Erica Krauth (Hungary) Katalin Marosi	6–2, 3–6, 2–6
Win	11.	11 July 2004	Darmstadt, Germany	Clay	(Germany) Vanessa Henke	(Serbia and Montenegro) Katarina Mišić (Serbia and Montenegro) Dragana Zarić	6–1, 7–5
Win	12.	20 September 2004	Biella, Italy	Clay	(Argentina) Erica Krauth	(Bosnia and Herzegovina) Mervana Jugić-Salkić (Croatia) Darija Jurak	6–2, 6–3
Win	13.	5 February 2005	Sunderland, UK	Hard (i)	(Sweden) Sofia Arvidsson	(Serbia and Montenegro) Dragana Zarić (Serbia and Montenegro) Katarina Mišić	6–2, 6–3
Win	14.	13 November 2005	Toronto, Canada	Hard (i)	(Ukraine) Olena Antypina	(United States) Lauren Barnikow (United States) Kristen Schlukebir	6–3, 6–1
Win	15.	16 April 2006	Civitavecchia, Italy	Clay	(Czech Republic) Lucie Hradecká	(Ukraine) Tatiana Perebiynis (Czech Republic) Barbora Strýcová	6–7^{(9)}, 6–3, 7–5
Loss	16.	28 July 2007	Pétange, Luxembourg	Clay	(Luxembourg) Claudine Schaul	(Belarus) Anastasiya Yakimova (Spain) Carla Suárez Navarro	7–6^{(4)}, 1–6, 6–7^{(1)}
Win	17.	7 April 2008	Biarritz, France	Clay	(Australia) Christina Wheeler	(Argentina) Jorgelina Cravero (Argentina) Betina Jozami	7–6^{(5)}, 3–6, [10–8]
