= Ľubomíra Kurhajcová =

Slovak tennis player

- Country (sports): Slovakia
- Residence: Bratislava, Slovakia
- Born: 11 October 1983 (age 41); Bratislava, Czechoslovakia
- Height: 1.80 m (5 ft 11 in)
- Turned pro: 2002
- Retired: 2008
- Plays: Right-handed (two-handed backhand)
- Prize money: US$366,913

Singles
- Career record: 217–210
- Career titles: 4 ITF
- Highest ranking: No. 59 (24 May 2004)

Grand Slam singles results
- Australian Open: 1R (2003–2005)
- French Open: 1R (2004)
- Wimbledon: 1R (2004)
- US Open: 1R (2003–2004)

Doubles
- Career record: 68–89
- Career titles: 3 ITF
- Highest ranking: No. 78 (13 September 2004)

Grand Slam doubles results
- Australian Open: 2R (2005)
- French Open: 1R (2004)
- Wimbledon: 1R (2004)
- US Open: 1R (2004)

Ľubomíra Kurhajcová (Slovak pronunciation: [ˈʎubɔmiːra ˈkurɦajtsɔʋaː]; born 11 October 1983) is a former professional Slovak tennis player. On 24 May 2004, she reached a career-high singles ranking of world No. 59. She never passed the first round of a Grand Slam championship in seven appearances but did get close at the 2004 French Open when she led Lisa Raymond 6–0, 5–0 in the first round and held two match points, only to lose the match 6–0, 5–7, 3–6.

Kurhajcová reached her first WTA Tour final in 2003 at the Pattaya Open, but lost to fellow Slovak Henrieta Nagyová. In doubles, she was a two-time runner-up, losing the 2004 Internazionali Femminili di Palermo final (teaming up with Nagyová) and the 2005 Copa Colsanitas final with Barbora Záhlavová-Strýcová.

== WTA career finals ==
=== Singles: 1 (runner-up) ===
Result	Date	Tournament	Tier	Surface	Opponent	Score
Loss	Nov 2003	Pattaya Open, Thailand	Tier V	Hard	(Slovakia) Henrieta Nagyová	4–6, 2–6

=== Doubles: 2 (runner-ups) ===
Result	Date	Tournament	Tier	Surface	Partner	Opponents	Score
Loss	Jul 2004	Palermo, Italy	Tier V	Clay	(Slovakia) Henrieta Nagyová	(Spain) Anabel Medina Garrigues (Spain) Arantxa Sánchez Vicario	3–6, 6–7^{(4)}
Loss	Feb 2005	Bogotá, Colombia	Tier III	Clay	(Czech Republic) Barbora Strýcová	(Switzerland) Emmanuelle Gagliardi (Slovenia) Tina Pisnik	4–6, 3–6

== ITF Circuit finals ==
Legend
$50,000 tournaments
$25,000 tournaments
$10,000 tournaments

=== Singles: 8 (4–4) ===
Result	No.	Date	Tournament	Surface	Opponent	Score
Loss	1.	17 June 2001	ITF Tallinn, Estonia	Clay	(Estonia) Kaia Kanepi	6–7^{(4)}, 3–6
Win	2.	21 August 2001	ITF Maribor, Slovenia	Clay	(Poland) Katarzyna Strączy	3–6, 7–5, 6–1
Loss	3.	17 September 2001	ITF Lecce, Italy	Clay	(Spain) Ainhoa Goñi	4–6, 0–6
Win	4.	4 August 2002	ITF Brindisi, Italy	Clay	(Czech Republic) Lenka Němečková	7–6^{(2)}, 6–0
Loss	5.	18 August 2002	ITF Bronx, United States	Hard	(United States) Ashley Harkleroad	1–6, 3–6
Win	6.	29 September 2002	ITF Girona, Spain	Clay	(Slovakia) Eva Fislová	6–3, 7–5
Win	7.	6 July 2003	ITF Orbetello, Italy	Clay	(Spain) Cristina Torrens Valero	7–5, 6–1
Loss	8.	13 June 2004	ITF Marseille, France	Clay	(Spain) Anabel Medina Garrigues	7–5, 3–6, 3–6

=== Doubles: 6 (3–3) ===
Outcome	No.	Date	Tournament	Surface	Partner	Opponents	Score
Winner	1.	4 October 1999	ITF Vila do Conde, Portugal	Hard	(Slovakia) Stanislava Hrozenská	(Slovakia) Danica Kováčová (Portugal) Carlota Santos	6–1, 6–2
Runner-up	2.	21 May 2001	ITF Sofia, Bulgaria	Clay	(Slovakia) Lenka Dlhopolcová	(Russia) Anna Bastrikova (Russia) Maria Goloviznina	3–6, 6–3, 2–6
Runner-up	3.	4 August 2002	ITF Brindisi, Italy	Clay	(Czech Republic) Lenka Němečková	(Italy) Flavia Pennetta (Romania) Andreea Ehritt-Vanc	3–6, 2–6
Runner-up	4.	16 September 2002	ITF Luxembourg	Clay	(Slovakia) Eva Fislová	(Czech Republic) Eva Martincová (Czech Republic) Lenka Němečková	1–6, 4–6
Winner	5.	1 December 2002	ITF Průhonice, Czech Republic	Carpet (i)	(Czech Republic) Sandra Kleinová	(Czech Republic) Libuše Průšová (Czech Republic) Renata Voráčová	7–6^{(12)}, 6–3
Winner	6.	21 September 2003	ITF Biella, Italy	Clay	(Czech Republic) Libuše Průšová	(Germany) Martina Müller (Czech Republic) Lenka Němečková	6–2, 6–4
