= Zsófia Gubacsi =

Hungarian tennis player

- Country (sports): Hungary
- Born: 6 April 1981 (age 44); Budapest, Hungary
- Height: 1.73 m (5 ft 8 in)
- Turned pro: 1999
- Retired: 2007
- Plays: Right-handed (two-handed backhand)
- Prize money: $375,640

Singles
- Career record: 269–212
- Career titles: 1 WTA, 6 ITF
- Highest ranking: No. 76 (29 April 2002)

Grand Slam singles results
- Australian Open: 1R (2002, 2005)
- French Open: 3R (2001)
- Wimbledon: 1R (2002)
- US Open: 1R (2001, 2002)

Doubles
- Career record: 135–117
- Career titles: 1 WTA, 8 ITF
- Highest ranking: No. 93 (27 January 2003)

Grand Slam doubles results
- Australian Open: 3R (2003)
- French Open: 1R (2004)
- Wimbledon: 1R (2004)
- US Open: 1R (2004)

Zsófia Gubacsi (born 6 April 1981) is a Hungarian former professional tennis player. She won one WTA Tour singles title at the 2001 Morocco Open in Casablanca.

== Personal life ==
Gubacsi was born to parents Julianna (née Harangozo) and Mihaly Gubacsi, who own a hotel.

She was a baseline player who likes all court surfaces, and she said her best shot is a secret. Her goal was to reach the top 50 in tennis.

She was originally coached by Jozsef Hegedus, but he would later be replaced by Attila Door.

== WTA career finals ==
=== Singles: 1 (title) ===
Legend
Grand Slam tournaments
Tier I (0–0)
Tier II (0–0)
Tier III, IV & V (1–0)

Result	W/L	Date	Tournament	Surface	Opponent	Score
Win	1–0	Jul 2001	Morocco Open	Clay	(Italy) Maria Elena Camerin	1–6, 6–3, 7–6^{(7–5)}

=== Doubles: 3 (1 title, 2 runner-ups) ===
Legend
Grand Slam tournaments
Tier I (0–0)
Tier II (0–0)
Tier III, IV & V (1–2)

Result	W/L	Date	Tournament	Surface	Partner	Opponents	Score
Loss	0–1	Apr 2001	Budapest Grand Prix, Hungary	Clay	(Serbia) Dragana Zarić	(Slovakia) Janette Husárová (Italy) Tathiana Garbin	1–6, 3–6
Win	1–1	Apr 2002	Estoril Open, Portugal	Clay	(Russia) Elena Bovina	(Germany) Barbara Rittner (Colombia) María Vento-Kabchi	6–3, 6–1
Loss	1–2	Apr 2002	Budapest Grand Prix, Hungary	Clay	(Russia) Elena Bovina	(Australia) Catherine Barclay (France) Émilie Loit	4–6, 6–3, 6–3

== ITF Circuit finals ==
Legend
$100,000 tournaments
$75,000 tournaments
$50,000 tournaments
$25,000 tournaments
$10,000 tournaments

=== Singles: 15 (6–9) ===
Result	No.	Date	Tournament	Surface	Opponent	Score
Win	1.	5 October 1998	ITF Montevideo, Uruguay	Clay	(Argentina) Clarisa Fernández	0–6, 6–3, 6–4
Loss	2.	18 October 1998	ITF Asunción, Paraguay	Clay	(Paraguay) Larissa Schaerer	1–6, 4–6
Win	3.	16 November 1998	ITF Los Mochis, Mexico	Hard	(Slovakia) Stanislava Hrozenská	6–3, 2–6, 7–6^{(6)}
Win	4.	23 November 1998	ITF Culiacán, Mexico	Hard	(Switzerland) Aliénor Tricerri	6–0, ret.
Loss	5.	27 July 1999	ITF Horb, Germany	Clay	(Hungary) Anna Földényi	3–6, 0–6
Loss	6.	23 August 1999	ITF Bucharest, Romania	Clay	(Czech Republic) Libuše Průšová	1–6, 1–6
Loss	7.	15 May 2000	ITF Edinburgh, United Kingdom	Clay	(Spain) María José Martínez Sánchez	2–6, 3–6
Loss	8.	31 July 2000	ITF Alghero, Italy	Hard	(Italy) Francesca Lubiani	1–6, 0–6
Win	9.	13 August 2000	ITF Rimini, Italy	Clay	(Estonia) Maret Ani	6–2, 6–2
Win	10.	10 September 2000	ITF Bucharest, Romania	Clay	(Bulgaria) Antoaneta Pandjerova	6–3, 6–4
Win	11.	14 May 2001	ITF Edinburgh, United Kingdom	Clay	(Germany) Syna Schmidle	6–4, 6–4
Loss	12.	21 July 2002	ITF Les Contamines, France	Hard	(France) Stéphanie Rizzi	6–0, 5–7, 4–6
Loss	13.	28 September 2003	ITF Biella, Italy	Clay	(Slovakia) Henrieta Nagyová	3–6, 1–6
Loss	14.	5 December 2004	ITF Ra'anana, Israel	Hard	(Israel) Shahar Pe'er	2–6, 1–6
Loss	15.	2 April 2006	ITF Poza Rica, Mexico	Hard	(Hungary) Kira Nagy	4–6, 2–6

=== Doubles: 19 (8–11) ===
Result	No.	Date	Tournament	Surface	Partner	Opponents	Score
Win	1.	5 October 1998	ITF Montevideo, Uruguay	Hard	(Argentina) Mariana López Palacios	(Brazil) Joana Cortez (Brazil) Eugenia Maia	3–6, 6–3, 6–4
Loss	2.	12 October 1998	ITF Asunción, Paraguay	Clay	(Switzerland) Aliénor Tricerri	(Paraguay) Laura Bernal (Paraguay) Larissa Schaerer	6–3, 6–7^{(3)}, 4–6
Win	3.	16 November 1998	ITF Los Mochis, Mexico	Hard	(Switzerland) Aliénor Tricerri	(Mexico) Melody Falcó (Mexico) Paola Palencia	6–1, 6–2
Loss	4.	23 November 1998	ITF Culiacan, Mexico	Clay	(Switzerland) Aliénor Tricerri	(Canada) Renata Kolbovic (Russia) Alina Jidkova	3–6, 2–6
Loss	5.	24 April 2000	ITF Bournemouth, United Kingdom	Clay	(United Kingdom) Hannah Collin	(Tunisia) Selima Sfar (United Kingdom) Lorna Woodroffe	1–6, 0–6
Loss	6.	1 May 2000	ITF Hatfield, United Kingdom	Clay	(Germany) Jasmin Wöhr	(Tunisia) Selima Sfar (United Kingdom) Joanne Ward	6–7^{(6)}, 2–6
Loss	7.	13 August 2000	ITF Rimini, Italy	Hard	(Austria) Nicole Remis	(Estonia) Maret Ani (Estonia) Margit Rüütel	6–3, 3–6, 5–7
Loss	8.	12 May 2003	ITF Bromma, Sweden	Clay	(Hungary) Melinda Czink	(Argentina) Gisela Dulko (Argentina) María Emilia Salerni	4–6, 3–6
Win	9.	9 June 2003	ITF Vaduz, Liechtenstein	Clay	(Czech Republic) Zuzana Hejdová	(Czech Republic) Petra Cetkovská (Czech Republic) Jana Hlaváčková	6–4, 6–4
Win	10.	12 October 2003	Dubai Challenge, United Arab Emirates	Hard	(Hungary) Kira Nagy	(Italy) Flavia Pennetta (Italy) Adriana Serra Zanetti	2–6, 6–2, 6–2
Loss	11.	9 February 2004	ITF Warsaw, Poland	Hard (i)	(Hungary) Kira Nagy	(Poland) Klaudia Jans (Poland) Alicja Rosolska	4–6, 3–6
Loss	12.	22 March 2004	ITF Athens, Greece	Hard	(Hungary) Kira Nagy	(Latvia) Līga Dekmeijere (Germany) Martina Müller	2–6, 6–1, 4–6
Win	13.	5 July 2004	ITF Cuneo, Italy	Clay	(Romania) Edina Gallovits-Hall	(Czech Republic) Eva Hrdinová (Czech Republic) Sandra Záhlavová	7–5, 6–3
Win	14.	7 August 2005	ITF Martina Franca, Italy	Clay	(Ukraine) Mariya Koryttseva	(Spain) Lourdes Domínguez Lino (Spain) Conchita Martínez Granados	6–1, 6–3
Loss	15.	11 September 2005	ITF Denain, France	Clay	(Ukraine) Mariya Koryttseva	(Czech Republic) Lucie Hradecká (Czech Republic) Vladimíra Uhlířová	0–6, 5–7
Loss	16.	16 October 2005	Open de Touraine, France	Hard (i)	(Belarus) Darya Kustova	(Croatia) Jelena Kostanić Tošić (Croatia) Matea Mezak	4–6, 4–6
Win	17.	30 October 2005	ITF Istanbul, Turkey	Hard	(Ukraine) Mariya Koryttseva	(Poland) Agnieszka Radwańska (Poland) Urszula Radwańska	6–3, 6–3
Loss	18.	28 March 2006	ITF Poza Rica, Mexico	Hard	(Hungary) Kira Nagy	(Czech Republic) Renata Voráčová (Croatia) Matea Mezak	2–6, 0–1 ret.
Win	19.	15 April 2006	ITF San Luis Potosí, Mexico	Clay	(Croatia) Matea Mezak	(Brazil) Joana Cortez (Spain) María José Martínez Sánchez	4–6, 6–4, 6–4
