= 2005 WTA Tour =

Women's tennis circuit

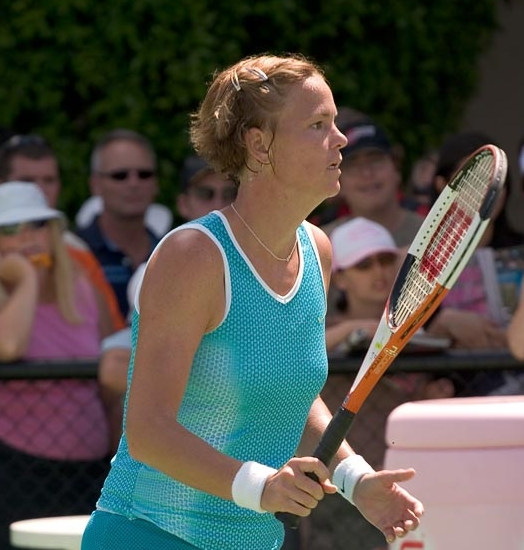
- Lindsay Davenport finished the year as WTA world No. 1 for the fourth time in her career, though Kim Clijsters was named the Player of the Year. Davenport won six tournaments during the season, including a Tier I event, and finished runner-up at two majors at the Australian Open and the Wimbledon Championships. Clijsters won nine tournaments during the season, including a major at the US Open, as well as three Tier I events.

Details
- Duration: January 1 – November 13, 2005
- Edition: 35th
- Tournaments: 63
- Categories: Grand Slam (4); WTA Championships; WTA Tier I (10); WTA Tier II (16); WTA Tier III (16); WTA Tier IV (14); WTA Tier V (2)

Achievements (singles)
- Most titles: (Belgium) Kim Clijsters (9)
- Most finals: (United States) Lindsay Davenport (10)
- Prize money leader: (Belgium) Kim Clijsters (US$3,983,654)
- Points leader: (United States) Lindsay Davenport (4,910)

Awards
- Player of the year: (Belgium) Kim Clijsters
- Doubles team of the year: (United States) Lisa Raymond (Australia) Samantha Stosur
- Most improved player of the year: (Serbia and Montenegro) Ana Ivanovic
- Newcomer of the year: (India) Sania Mirza
- Comeback player of the year: (Belgium) Kim Clijsters

The 2005 WTA Tour was the elite professional tennis circuit organized by the Women's Tennis Association (WTA) for the 2005 tennis season. The 2005 WTA Tour included the four Grand Slam tournaments, the WTA Tour Championships and the WTA Tier I, Tier II, Tier III, Tier IV and Tier V events. ITF tournaments were not part of the WTA Tour, although they award points for the WTA World Ranking.

== Season summary ==
=== Singles ===
Going into 2005, Lindsay Davenport was holding the No. 1 ranking and therefore was the top seed at the year's first Grand Slam, the Australian Open. She reached the final for the first time since she won the event in 2000, coming back against Alicia Molik in the quarterfinals and Nathalie Dechy in the semifinals. Molik had a successful warm-up by winning the tournament in Sydney. Meanwhile, Serena Williams came through in the bottom half, beating Amélie Mauresmo and Maria Sharapova. In the final, Williams won her seventh Grand Slam title, and first since Wimbledon 2003. Justine Henin-Hardenne and Kim Clijsters both continued to struggle with injuries and skipped the event.

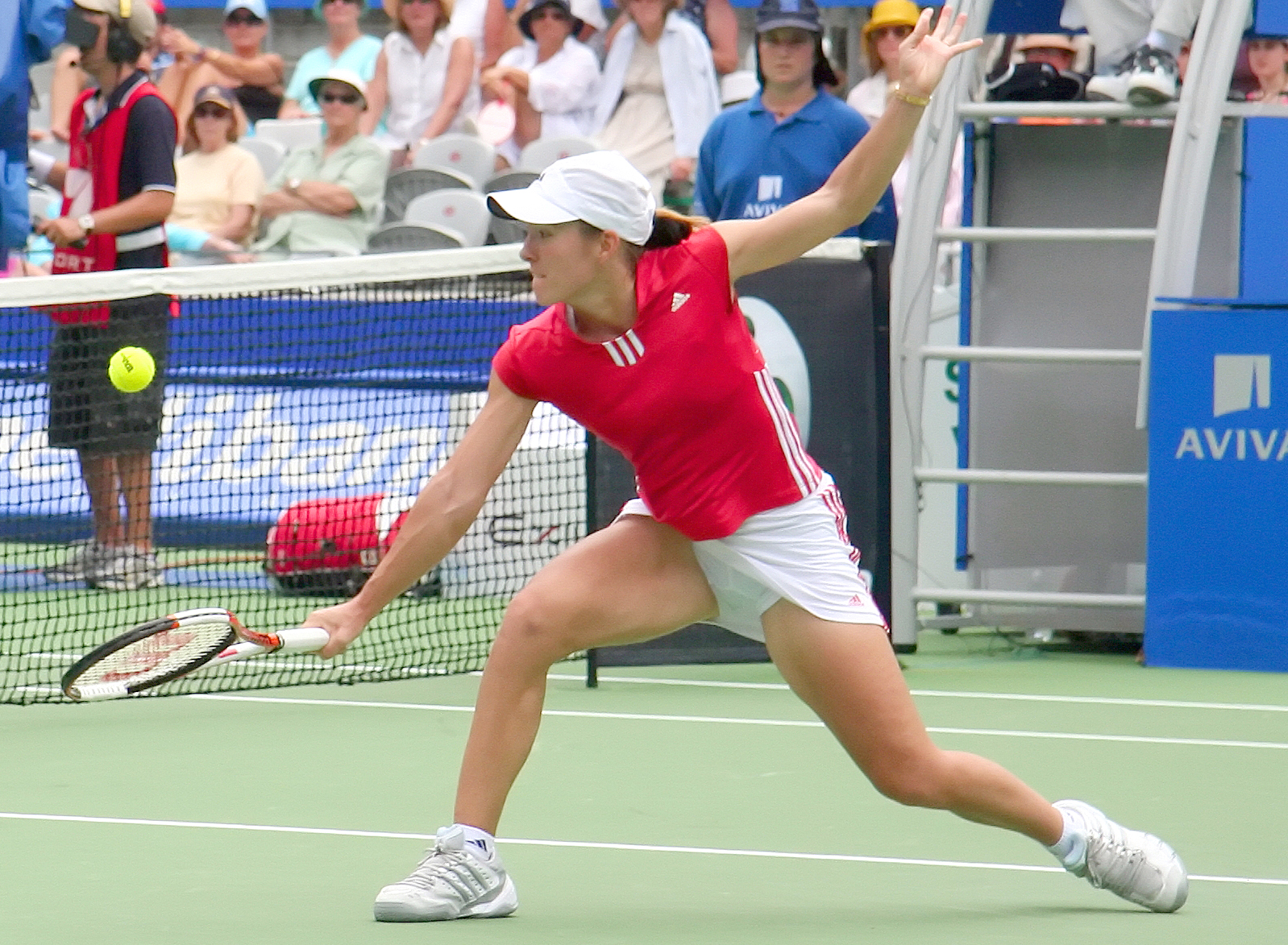
Justine Henin-Hardenne made a successful return from injury, winning the French Open.

The following week, Sharapova won the event in Tokyo, beating Davenport in the final. Moving into February, Mauresmo proved strong, winning in Antwerp and reaching the Paris final before losing to Dinara Safina. Sharapova also won the event in Doha, with Davenport winning in Dubai. Molik reached the semifinals of Antwerp and the final of Doha to continue her strong start to the season. Clijsters returned to competition in Antwerp, losing to Venus Williams.

Clijsters then won 14 straight matches to take back-to-back titles in Indian Wells and Miami. In the former, she beat Davenport (who had defeated Maria Sharapova 6–0, 6–0 in the semi-finals) in the final. In the latter, she beat Sharapova in the final. Clijsters was only the second woman to achieve the feat of winning both tournaments, after Steffi Graf in 1996.

Henin-Hardenne returned to competitive tennis in Miami, where she lost to Sharapova, but she then went on to dominate the clay season, winning events in Charleston, Warsaw and Berlin and building a 17-match winning streak. In the other big clay tournament in Rome, Mauresmo came out as the champion. Also enjoying good results in the clay season were Nadia Petrova, who reached the final of Berlin and the semifinals of Amelia Island and Patty Schnyder, who reached the semifinals of Berlin and Charleston, and the final of Rome. Davenport won the title in Amelia Island.

As the favourite to win the French Open title, Henin-Hardenne reached the final, saving match points against Kuznetsova in the fourth round, before beating Sharapova in the quarterfinals. In the semifinals, she beat Petrova. On the top half of the draw, Mary Pierce moved through to her first Grand Slam final since 2000 by defeating Davenport in the quarterfinals and then Elena Likhovtseva in the semifinals. Henin-Hardenne eventually won her fourth Grand Slam title, beating Pierce with the loss of only two games.

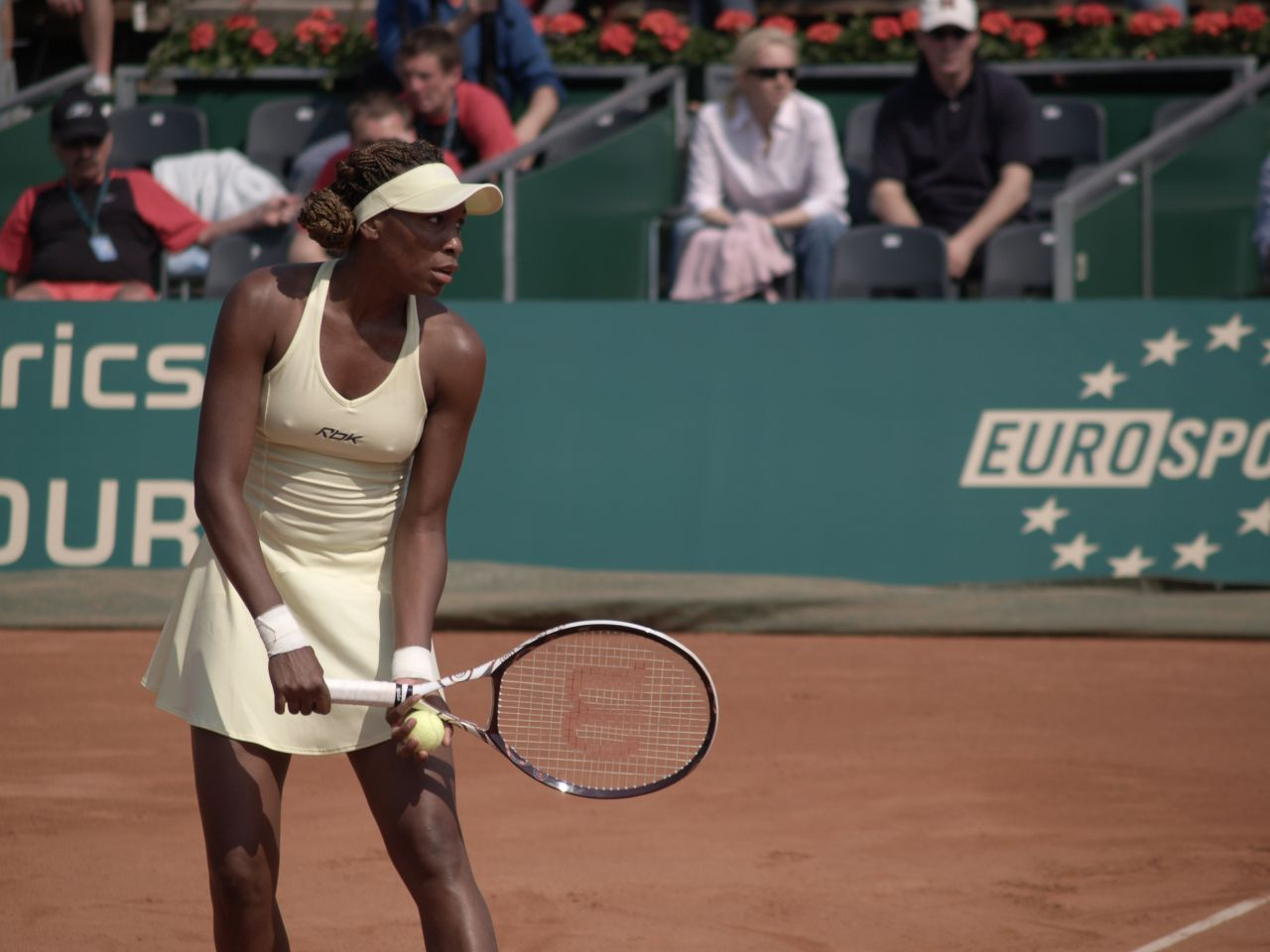
Venus Williams' Wimbledon triumph was her first singles Grand Slam trophy since 2001.

Wimbledon opened up with an early upset, as Henin-Hardenne became the first French Open champion to crash out in the first round, losing to Eleni Daniilidou, who brought an end to the Belgian's 24-match win streak. Australian Open champion Serena Williams also continued her struggles since that title, losing in the third round to Jill Craybas. In the semifinals, Venus Williams beat defending champion Sharapova, while Davenport moved past Mauresmo in a tight match. The final turned out to be the longest women's final in Wimbledon history, with Williams saving a match point before going on to win her third Wimbledon title, after 2000 and 2001.

The summer hardcourt season saw a strong run from Kim Clijsters, who won titles in Stanford, Los Angeles and Toronto. Her only loss in the lead-up to the U.S. Open came against Peng Shuai in San Diego. In the absence of Clijsters, Mary Pierce won that event, beating Ai Sugiyama in the final. Lindsay Davenport took the title in New Haven, over Mauresmo in the final.

Maria Sharapova became the first Russian female player to be ranked World No. 1 by the WTA Tour; she claimed the ranking on 22 August, though Lindsay Davenport would reclaim the ranking the following week. Sharapova would herself recapture the top ranking following the US Open, despite losing in the semi-finals to Kim Clijsters. She would hold it until the end of the season, when again Davenport took over at the top.

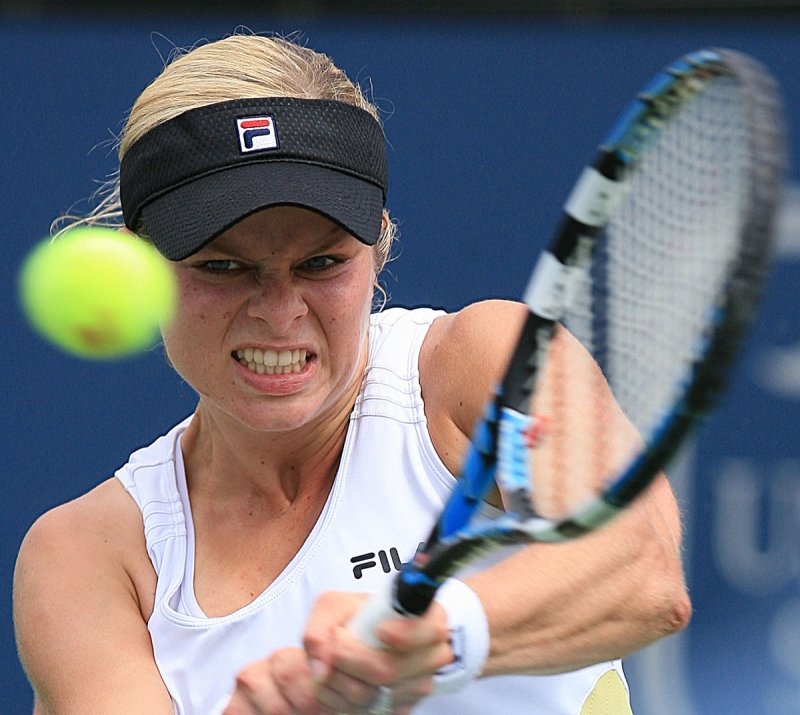
Kim Clijsters won the U.S. Open as the culmination of a dominant summer.

After a struggling season up until now, Svetlana Kuznetsova went into her U.S. Open title defense in poor form, and subsequently lost on the very first day, becoming the first defending women's champion to lose in the first round. 2003 champion Henin-Hardenne lost to Mary Pierce in the fourth round, while Venus Williams beat her sister, Serena, in the fourth round, before losing to Clijsters in the quarterfinals. Eventually, Clijsters beat Sharapova to reach the final. On the bottom half of the draw, Pierce followed up her upset of Henin-Hardenne with wins over Mauresmo and Dementieva, who beat Davenport in the quarterfinals, to reach her second Grand Slam final of the year. There, she lost to Clijsters, who finally won her first Grand Slam title after losing in four finals previously.

The fall season started with a surprise final in Beijing, with Maria Kirilenko beating Anna-Lena Grönefeld to win the event. Grönefeld also reached the final in Luxembourg, where she lost to Clijsters. Davenport won three tournaments in the last stretch of the year in Bali, Stuttgart and Zurich to secure the year end No. 1 ranking for the second straight season. Mary Pierce won her second Tier I event of the season in the Moscow event. Nadia Petrova won her first title after several lost finals in Linz, and Amélie Mauresmo won her third straight title in Philadelphia. It also proved a successful period for Patty Schnyder, who was the runner-up in Zurich and Linz, and Francesca Schiavone, who recorded three runner-up finishes in Bali, Hasselt and Moscow. Nicole Vaidišová won three smaller titles in three weeks in Seoul, Tokyo and Bangkok respectively.

In the big finish to the season, the year-ending championships, Mauresmo beat Pierce to win her biggest career title up to that point, with Davenport and Sharapova reaching the semifinals. Petrova, Dementieva, Clijsters and Schnyder were the other qualifiers.

=== Notable breakthrough players ===
The 2005 season saw the breakthrough of 17-year-old Serbian Ana Ivanovic into the WTA Tour. Starting the season ranked World No. 97 (an increase of 608 places from the previous year), Ivanovic won her first WTA career title at the Canberra International as a qualifier, defeating lucky loser Melinda Czink in the final, 7–5, 6–1. She then went on to make her Grand Slam debut at the 2005 Australian Open, defeating Iveta Benešová and Maria Kirilenko in the first two rounds before losing to Amélie Mauresmo in the third. She then went on to make the quarter-finals in Miami (losing to Mauresmo again, having defeated Svetlana Kuznetsova and Nadia Petrova en route) and the semi-finals in Warsaw (losing to Justine Henin-Hardenne, having defeated Vera Zvonareva en route); these results saw her enter the World's Top 30 for the first time. Seeded 29th at her first French Open, Ivanovic caused an upset in the third round when she defeated Mauresmo in three sets, en route to reaching the quarter-finals in just her second appearance in the main draw of a Grand Slam tournament, where she eventually lost to Nadia Petrova. Following Wimbledon, Ivanovic entered the World's Top 20 for the first time, however an injury she suffered at the Rogers Cup caused her to be defeated in the second round of the US Open. A strong finish to the season, including two semi-finals in Zurich and Linz, saw her finish the 2005 season ranked World No. 16; subsequently, she was recognised as the WTA's "Most Improved Player" (a feat she would repeat in 2007).

== Schedule ==
The table below shows the 2005 WTA Tour schedule.

Key

Grand Slam events
Year-end championships
Tier I events
Tier II events
Tier III events
Tier IV and V events
Team events

=== January ===
Week	Tournament	Champions	Runners-up	Semifinalists	Quarterfinalists
3 Jan	Hopman Cup; Perth, Australia; Hopman Cup; Hard (i) – 8 teams (RR)	Slovakia; 3–0	Argentina	Round robin losers (group A) Germany; Italy; Russia	Round robin losers (group B) Netherlands; Australia; United States
3 Jan	Uncle Tobys Hardcourts; Gold Coast, Australia; Tier III event Hard – $170,000 – 32S/32Q/16D; Singles – Doubles	(Switzerland) Patty Schnyder; 1–6, 6–3, 7–5	(Australia) Samantha Stosur	(Italy) Silvia Farina Elia (France) Tatiana Golovin	(Russia) Nadia Petrova (Bulgaria) Magdalena Maleeva (Italy) Flavia Pennetta (Bulgaria) Sesil Karatantcheva
3 Jan	Uncle Tobys Hardcourts; Gold Coast, Australia; Tier III event Hard – $170,000 – 32S/32Q/16D; Singles – Doubles	(Russia) Elena Likhovtseva (Bulgaria) Magdalena Maleeva; 6–3, 5–7, 6–1	(Italy) Maria Elena Camerin (Italy) Silvia Farina Elia	(Italy) Silvia Farina Elia (France) Tatiana Golovin	(Russia) Nadia Petrova (Bulgaria) Magdalena Maleeva (Italy) Flavia Pennetta (Bulgaria) Sesil Karatantcheva
3 Jan	ASB Classic; Auckland, New Zealand; Tier IV event Hard – $140,000 – 32S/32Q/16D; Singles – Doubles	(Slovenia) Katarina Srebotnik; 5–7, 7–5, 6–4	(Japan) Shinobu Asagoe	(United States) Amy Frazier (France) Marion Bartoli	(Russia) Tatiana Panova (Slovakia) Janette Husárová (Israel) Shahar Pe'er (Serbia and Montenegro) Jelena Janković
3 Jan	ASB Classic; Auckland, New Zealand; Tier IV event Hard – $140,000 – 32S/32Q/16D; Singles – Doubles	(Japan) Shinobu Asagoe (Slovenia) Katarina Srebotnik; 6–3, 6–3	(New Zealand) Leanne Baker (Italy) Francesca Lubiani	(United States) Amy Frazier (France) Marion Bartoli	(Russia) Tatiana Panova (Slovakia) Janette Husárová (Israel) Shahar Pe'er (Serbia and Montenegro) Jelena Janković
10 Jan	Medibank International; Sydney, Australia; Tier II event Hard – $585,000 – 28S/32Q/16D; Singles – Doubles	(Australia) Alicia Molik; 6–7^{(5–7)}, 6–4, 7–5	(Australia) Samantha Stosur	(Russia) Elena Dementieva (China) Peng Shuai	(United States) Lindsay Davenport (Switzerland) Patty Schnyder (Colombia) Fabiola Zuluaga (Russia) Nadia Petrova
10 Jan	Medibank International; Sydney, Australia; Tier II event Hard – $585,000 – 28S/32Q/16D; Singles – Doubles	(Australia) Bryanne Stewart (Australia) Samantha Stosur; Walkover	(Russia) Elena Dementieva (Japan) Ai Sugiyama	(Russia) Elena Dementieva (China) Peng Shuai	(United States) Lindsay Davenport (Switzerland) Patty Schnyder (Colombia) Fabiola Zuluaga (Russia) Nadia Petrova
10 Jan	Moorilla Hobart International; Hobart, Australia; Tier V event Hard – $110,000 – 32S/32Q/16D; Singles – Doubles	(China) Zheng Jie; 6–2, 6–0	(Argentina) Gisela Dulko	(China) Li Na (Czech Republic) Iveta Benešová	(Poland) Marta Domachowska (Czech Republic) Klára Koukalová (Czech Republic) Nicole Vaidišová (Czech Republic) Květa Peschke
10 Jan	Moorilla Hobart International; Hobart, Australia; Tier V event Hard – $110,000 – 32S/32Q/16D; Singles – Doubles	(China) Yan Zi (China) Zheng Jie; 6–4, 7–5	(Spain) Anabel Medina Garrigues (Russia) Dinara Safina	(China) Li Na (Czech Republic) Iveta Benešová	(Poland) Marta Domachowska (Czech Republic) Klára Koukalová (Czech Republic) Nicole Vaidišová (Czech Republic) Květa Peschke
10 Jan	Canberra Women's Classic; Canberra, Australia; Tier V event Hard – $110,000 – 32S/32Q/16D; Singles – Doubles	(Serbia and Montenegro) Ana Ivanovic; 7–5, 6–1	(Hungary) Melinda Czink	(Ukraine) Yuliana Fedak (United States) Lindsay Lee-Waters	(Italy) Silvia Farina Elia (France) Marion Bartoli (Germany) Anca Barna (Germany) Marlene Weingärtner
10 Jan	Canberra Women's Classic; Canberra, Australia; Tier V event Hard – $110,000 – 32S/32Q/16D; Singles – Doubles	(Italy) Tathiana Garbin (Slovenia) Tina Križan; 7–5, 1–6, 6–4	(Czech Republic) Gabriela Navrátilová (Czech Republic) Michaela Paštiková	(Ukraine) Yuliana Fedak (United States) Lindsay Lee-Waters	(Italy) Silvia Farina Elia (France) Marion Bartoli (Germany) Anca Barna (Germany) Marlene Weingärtner
17 Jan; 24 Jan	Australian Open; Melbourne, Australia; Grand Slam; Hard – $5,952,601 – 128S/96Q/64D/32X; Singles – Doubles – Mixed doubles	(United States) Serena Williams; 2–6, 6–3, 6–0	(United States) Lindsay Davenport	(France) Nathalie Dechy (Russia) Maria Sharapova	(Australia) Alicia Molik (Switzerland) Patty Schnyder (Russia) Svetlana Kuznetsova (France) Amélie Mauresmo
17 Jan; 24 Jan	Australian Open; Melbourne, Australia; Grand Slam; Hard – $5,952,601 – 128S/96Q/64D/32X; Singles – Doubles – Mixed doubles	(Russia) Svetlana Kuznetsova (Australia) Alicia Molik; 6–3, 6–4	(United States) Lindsay Davenport (United States) Corina Morariu	(France) Nathalie Dechy (Russia) Maria Sharapova	(Australia) Alicia Molik (Switzerland) Patty Schnyder (Russia) Svetlana Kuznetsova (France) Amélie Mauresmo
17 Jan; 24 Jan	Australian Open; Melbourne, Australia; Grand Slam; Hard – $5,952,601 – 128S/96Q/64D/32X; Singles – Doubles – Mixed doubles	(Australia) Scott Draper (Australia) Samantha Stosur; 6–2, 2–6, 7–6^{(8–6)}	(Zimbabwe) Kevin Ullyett (South Africa) Liezel Huber	(France) Nathalie Dechy (Russia) Maria Sharapova	(Australia) Alicia Molik (Switzerland) Patty Schnyder (Russia) Svetlana Kuznetsova (France) Amélie Mauresmo
31 Jan	Toray Pan Pacific Open; Tokyo, Japan; Tier I event Carpet (i) – $1,300,000 – 28S/32Q/16D; Singles – Doubles	(Russia) Maria Sharapova; 6–1, 3–6, 7–6^{(7–5)}	(United States) Lindsay Davenport	(Russia) Svetlana Kuznetsova (Japan) Shinobu Asagoe	(Czech Republic) Iveta Benešová (Slovakia) Daniela Hantuchová (Russia) Elena Dementieva (Russia) Elena Likhovtseva
31 Jan	Toray Pan Pacific Open; Tokyo, Japan; Tier I event Carpet (i) – $1,300,000 – 28S/32Q/16D; Singles – Doubles	(Slovakia) Janette Husárová (Russia) Elena Likhovtseva; 6–4, 6–3	(United States) Lindsay Davenport (United States) Corina Morariu	(Russia) Svetlana Kuznetsova (Japan) Shinobu Asagoe	(Czech Republic) Iveta Benešová (Slovakia) Daniela Hantuchová (Russia) Elena Dementieva (Russia) Elena Likhovtseva
31 Jan	Volvo Women's Open; Pattaya, Thailand; Tier IV event Hard – $170,000 – 32S/32Q/16D; Singles – Doubles	(Spain) Conchita Martínez; 6–3, 3–6, 6–3	(Germany) Anna-Lena Grönefeld	(Russia) Evgenia Linetskaya (Spain) Virginia Ruano Pascual	(Russia) Vera Zvonareva (Israel) Shahar Pe'er (Ukraine) Alona Bondarenko (Spain) Magüi Serna
31 Jan	Volvo Women's Open; Pattaya, Thailand; Tier IV event Hard – $170,000 – 32S/32Q/16D; Singles – Doubles	(France) Marion Bartoli (Germany) Anna-Lena Grönefeld; 6–3, 6–2	(Poland) Marta Domachowska (Croatia) Silvija Talaja	(Russia) Evgenia Linetskaya (Spain) Virginia Ruano Pascual	(Russia) Vera Zvonareva (Israel) Shahar Pe'er (Ukraine) Alona Bondarenko (Spain) Magüi Serna

=== February ===
Week	Tournament	Champions	Runners-up	Semifinalists	Quarterfinalists
7 Feb	Open Gaz de France; Paris, France; Tier II event Hard (i) – $585,000 – 28S/32Q/16D; Singles – Doubles	(Russia) Dinara Safina; 6–4, 2–6, 6–3	(France) Amélie Mauresmo	(France) Tatiana Golovin (Russia) Nadia Petrova	(United States) Serena Williams (Italy) Silvia Farina Elia (France) Marion Bartoli (Bulgaria) Magdalena Maleeva
7 Feb	Open Gaz de France; Paris, France; Tier II event Hard (i) – $585,000 – 28S/32Q/16D; Singles – Doubles	(Czech Republic) Iveta Benešová (Czech Republic) Květa Peschke; 6–2, 2–6, 6–2	(Spain) Anabel Medina Garrigues (Russia) Dinara Safina	(France) Tatiana Golovin (Russia) Nadia Petrova	(United States) Serena Williams (Italy) Silvia Farina Elia (France) Marion Bartoli (Bulgaria) Magdalena Maleeva
7 Feb	AP Tourism Hyderabad Open; Hyderabad, India; Tier IV event Hard – $140,000 – 32S/32Q/16D; Singles – Doubles	(India) Sania Mirza; 6–4, 5–7, 6–3	(Ukraine) Alona Bondarenko	(Russia) Maria Kirilenko (Germany) Anna-Lena Grönefeld	(China) Li Na (Israel) Tzipora Obziler (Canada) Marie-Ève Pelletier (China) Sun Tiantian
7 Feb	AP Tourism Hyderabad Open; Hyderabad, India; Tier IV event Hard – $140,000 – 32S/32Q/16D; Singles – Doubles	(China) Yan Zi (China) Zheng Jie; 6–4, 6–1	(China) Li Ting (China) Sun Tiantian	(Russia) Maria Kirilenko (Germany) Anna-Lena Grönefeld	(China) Li Na (Israel) Tzipora Obziler (Canada) Marie-Ève Pelletier (China) Sun Tiantian
14 Feb	Proximus Diamond Games; Antwerp, Belgium; Tier II event Hard (i) – $585,000 – 28S/32Q/16D; Singles – Doubles	(France) Amélie Mauresmo; 4–6, 7–5, 6–4	(United States) Venus Williams	(Australia) Alicia Molik (Russia) Anastasia Myskina	(Switzerland) Patty Schnyder (Czech Republic) Klára Koukalová (Belgium) Kim Clijsters (Slovenia) Katarina Srebotnik
14 Feb	Proximus Diamond Games; Antwerp, Belgium; Tier II event Hard (i) – $585,000 – 28S/32Q/16D; Singles – Doubles	(Zimbabwe) Cara Black (Belgium) Els Callens; 3–6, 6–4, 6–4	(Spain) Anabel Medina Garrigues (Russia) Dinara Safina	(Australia) Alicia Molik (Russia) Anastasia Myskina	(Switzerland) Patty Schnyder (Czech Republic) Klára Koukalová (Belgium) Kim Clijsters (Slovenia) Katarina Srebotnik
14 Feb	Cellular South Cup; Memphis, United States; Tier III event Hard (i) – $170,000 – 32S/32Q/16D; Singles – Doubles	(Russia) Vera Zvonareva; 7–6^{(7–3)}, 6–2	(United States) Meghann Shaughnessy	(Russia) Evgenia Linetskaya (Czech Republic) Nicole Vaidišová	(Ukraine) Kateryna Bondarenko (Japan) Akiko Morigami (South Korea) Cho Yoon-jeong (United States) Jamea Jackson
14 Feb	Cellular South Cup; Memphis, United States; Tier III event Hard (i) – $170,000 – 32S/32Q/16D; Singles – Doubles	(Japan) Miho Saeki (Japan) Yuka Yoshida; 6–3, 6–4	(United States) Laura Granville (United States) Abigail Spears	(Russia) Evgenia Linetskaya (Czech Republic) Nicole Vaidišová	(Ukraine) Kateryna Bondarenko (Japan) Akiko Morigami (South Korea) Cho Yoon-jeong (United States) Jamea Jackson
14 Feb	Copa Colsanitas Seguros Bolívar; Bogotá, Colombia; Tier III event Clay – $170,000 – 32S/32Q/16D; Singles – Doubles	(Italy) Flavia Pennetta; 7–6^{(7–4)}, 6–4	(Spain) Lourdes Domínguez Lino	(Colombia) Fabiola Zuluaga (Argentina) Clarisa Fernández	(Colombia) Catalina Castaño (Czech Republic) Eva Birnerová (Switzerland) Emmanuelle Gagliardi (Czech Republic) Barbora Strýcová
14 Feb	Copa Colsanitas Seguros Bolívar; Bogotá, Colombia; Tier III event Clay – $170,000 – 32S/32Q/16D; Singles – Doubles	(Switzerland) Emmanuelle Gagliardi (Slovenia) Tina Pisnik; 6–4, 6–3	(Slovakia) Ľubomíra Kurhajcová (Czech Republic) Barbora Strýcová	(Colombia) Fabiola Zuluaga (Argentina) Clarisa Fernández	(Colombia) Catalina Castaño (Czech Republic) Eva Birnerová (Switzerland) Emmanuelle Gagliardi (Czech Republic) Barbora Strýcová
21 Feb	Qatar Total Open; Doha, Qatar; Tier II event Hard – $600,000 – 28S/32Q/16D; Singles – Doubles	(Russia) Maria Sharapova; 4–6, 6–1, 6–4	(Australia) Alicia Molik	(France) Amélie Mauresmo (Slovakia) Daniela Hantuchová	(Russia) Maria Kirilenko (Italy) Francesca Schiavone (Spain) Conchita Martínez (France) Marion Bartoli
21 Feb	Qatar Total Open; Doha, Qatar; Tier II event Hard – $600,000 – 28S/32Q/16D; Singles – Doubles	(Australia) Alicia Molik (Italy) Francesca Schiavone; 6–3, 6–4	(Zimbabwe) Cara Black (South Africa) Liezel Huber	(France) Amélie Mauresmo (Slovakia) Daniela Hantuchová	(Russia) Maria Kirilenko (Italy) Francesca Schiavone (Spain) Conchita Martínez (France) Marion Bartoli
21 Feb	Abierto Mexicano Telcel; Acapulco, Mexico; Tier III event Clay – $180,000 – 32S/32Q/16D; Singles – Doubles	(Italy) Flavia Pennetta; 3–6, 7–5, 6–3	(Slovakia) Ľudmila Cervanová	(Italy) Antonella Serra Zanetti (Madagascar) Dally Randriantefy	(United States) Lilia Osterloh (Colombia) Catalina Castaño (France) Émilie Loit (Spain) Arantxa Parra Santonja
21 Feb	Abierto Mexicano Telcel; Acapulco, Mexico; Tier III event Clay – $180,000 – 32S/32Q/16D; Singles – Doubles	(Russia) Alina Jidkova (Ukraine) Tatiana Perebiynis; 7–5, 6–3	(Spain) Rosa María Andrés Rodríguez (Spain) Conchita Martínez Granados	(Italy) Antonella Serra Zanetti (Madagascar) Dally Randriantefy	(United States) Lilia Osterloh (Colombia) Catalina Castaño (France) Émilie Loit (Spain) Arantxa Parra Santonja
28 Feb	Dubai Duty Free Women's Open; Dubai, United Arab Emirates; Tier II event Hard – $1,000,000 – 28S/32Q/16D; Singles – Doubles	(United States) Lindsay Davenport; 6–4, 3–6, 6–4	(Serbia and Montenegro) Jelena Janković	(Switzerland) Patty Schnyder (United States) Serena Williams	(Spain) Conchita Martínez (Russia) Anastasia Myskina (India) Sania Mirza (Slovakia) Daniela Hantuchová
28 Feb	Dubai Duty Free Women's Open; Dubai, United Arab Emirates; Tier II event Hard – $1,000,000 – 28S/32Q/16D; Singles – Doubles	(Spain) Virginia Ruano Pascual (Argentina) Paola Suárez; 6–7^{(7–9)}, 6–2, 6–1	(Russia) Svetlana Kuznetsova (Australia) Alicia Molik	(Switzerland) Patty Schnyder (United States) Serena Williams	(Spain) Conchita Martínez (Russia) Anastasia Myskina (India) Sania Mirza (Slovakia) Daniela Hantuchová

=== March ===
Week	Tournament	Champions	Runners-up	Semifinalists	Quarterfinalists
7 Mar; 14 Mar	Pacific Life Open; Indian Wells, United States; Tier I event Hard – $2,100,000 – 96S/48Q/32D; Singles – Doubles	(Belgium) Kim Clijsters; 6–4, 4–6, 6–2	(United States) Lindsay Davenport	(Russia) Maria Sharapova (Russia) Elena Dementieva	(France) Nathalie Dechy (France) Mary Pierce (Russia) Svetlana Kuznetsova (Spain) Conchita Martínez
7 Mar; 14 Mar	Pacific Life Open; Indian Wells, United States; Tier I event Hard – $2,100,000 – 96S/48Q/32D; Singles – Doubles	(Spain) Virginia Ruano Pascual (Argentina) Paola Suárez; 7–6^{(7–3)}, 6–1	(Russia) Nadia Petrova (United States) Meghann Shaughnessy	(Russia) Maria Sharapova (Russia) Elena Dementieva	(France) Nathalie Dechy (France) Mary Pierce (Russia) Svetlana Kuznetsova (Spain) Conchita Martínez
21 Mar; 28 Mar	NASDAQ-100 Open; Key Biscayne, United States; Tier I event Hard – $3,115,000 – 96S/48Q/32D; Singles – Doubles	(Belgium) Kim Clijsters; 6–3, 7–5	(Russia) Maria Sharapova	(France) Amélie Mauresmo (United States) Venus Williams	(Serbia and Montenegro) Ana Ivanovic (Russia) Elena Dementieva (United States) Serena Williams (Belgium) Justine Henin-Hardenne
21 Mar; 28 Mar	NASDAQ-100 Open; Key Biscayne, United States; Tier I event Hard – $3,115,000 – 96S/48Q/32D; Singles – Doubles	(Russia) Svetlana Kuznetsova (Australia) Alicia Molik; 7–5, 6–7^{(5–7)}, 6–2	(United States) Lisa Raymond (Australia) Rennae Stubbs	(France) Amélie Mauresmo (United States) Venus Williams	(Serbia and Montenegro) Ana Ivanovic (Russia) Elena Dementieva (United States) Serena Williams (Belgium) Justine Henin-Hardenne

=== April ===
Week	Tournament	Champions	Runners-up	Semifinalists	Quarterfinalists
4 Apr	Bausch & Lomb Championships; Amelia Island, United States; Tier II event $585,000 – clay (green) – 56S/32Q/16D; Singles – Doubles	(United States) Lindsay Davenport; 7–5, 7–5	(Italy) Silvia Farina Elia	(Russia) Nadia Petrova (France) Virginie Razzano	(United States) Venus Williams (Japan) Shinobu Asagoe (Russia) Vera Zvonareva (United States) Serena Williams
4 Apr	Bausch & Lomb Championships; Amelia Island, United States; Tier II event $585,000 – clay (green) – 56S/32Q/16D; Singles – Doubles	(Australia) Bryanne Stewart (Australia) Samantha Stosur; 6–4, 6–2	(Czech Republic) Květa Peschke (Switzerland) Patty Schnyder	(Russia) Nadia Petrova (France) Virginie Razzano	(United States) Venus Williams (Japan) Shinobu Asagoe (Russia) Vera Zvonareva (United States) Serena Williams
11 Apr	Family Circle Cup; Charleston, United States; Tier I event $1,300,000 – clay (green) – 56S/32Q/28D; Singles – Doubles	(Belgium) Justine Henin-Hardenne; 7–5, 6–4	(Russia) Elena Dementieva	(France) Tatiana Golovin (Switzerland) Patty Schnyder	(United States) Lindsay Davenport (Russia) Nadia Petrova (Czech Republic) Nicole Vaidišová (Slovenia) Katarina Srebotnik
11 Apr	Family Circle Cup; Charleston, United States; Tier I event $1,300,000 – clay (green) – 56S/32Q/28D; Singles – Doubles	(Spain) Conchita Martínez (Spain) Virginia Ruano Pascual; 6–1, 6–4	(Czech Republic) Iveta Benešová (Czech Republic) Květa Peschke	(France) Tatiana Golovin (Switzerland) Patty Schnyder	(United States) Lindsay Davenport (Russia) Nadia Petrova (Czech Republic) Nicole Vaidišová (Slovenia) Katarina Srebotnik
18 Apr	Fed Cup: Quarterfinals; Brindisi, Italy, Clay; Delray Beach, United States, Hard; Jerez, Spain, Clay; Pörtschach, Austria, Clay	Quarterfinal winners Russia 4–1; United States 5–0; Spain 3–2; France 4–1	Quarterfinal losers Italy; Belgium; Argentina; Austria		
25 Apr	J&S Cup; Warsaw, Poland; Tier II event Clay – $585,000 – 28S/32Q/16D; Singles – Doubles	(Belgium) Justine Henin-Hardenne; 3–6, 6–2, 7–5	(Russia) Svetlana Kuznetsova	(Serbia and Montenegro) Ana Ivanovic (Belgium) Kim Clijsters	(France) Nathalie Dechy (Switzerland) Patty Schnyder (Russia) Elena Bovina (Italy) Silvia Farina Elia
25 Apr	J&S Cup; Warsaw, Poland; Tier II event Clay – $585,000 – 28S/32Q/16D; Singles – Doubles	(Ukraine) Tatiana Perebiynis (Czech Republic) Barbora Strýcová; 6–1, 6–4	(Poland) Klaudia Jans (Poland) Alicja Rosolska	(Serbia and Montenegro) Ana Ivanovic (Belgium) Kim Clijsters	(France) Nathalie Dechy (Switzerland) Patty Schnyder (Russia) Elena Bovina (Italy) Silvia Farina Elia
25 Apr	Estoril Open; Oeiras, Portugal; Tier IV event Clay – $140,000 – 32S/21Q/13D; Singles – Doubles	(Czech Republic) Lucie Šafářová; 6–7^{(4–7)}, 6–4, 6–3	(China) Li Na	(Argentina) Gisela Dulko (Russia) Dinara Safina	(Argentina) Mariana Díaz Oliva (China) Zheng Jie (Madagascar) Dally Randriantefy (United States) Jill Craybas
25 Apr	Estoril Open; Oeiras, Portugal; Tier IV event Clay – $140,000 – 32S/21Q/13D; Singles – Doubles	(China) Li Ting (China) Sun Tiantian; 6–3, 6–1	(Netherlands) Michaëlla Krajicek (Slovakia) Henrieta Nagyová	(Argentina) Gisela Dulko (Russia) Dinara Safina	(Argentina) Mariana Díaz Oliva (China) Zheng Jie (Madagascar) Dally Randriantefy (United States) Jill Craybas

=== May ===
Week	Tournament	Champions	Runners-up	Semifinalists	Quarterfinalists
2 May	Qatar Total German Open; Berlin, Germany; Tier I event Clay – $1,300,000 – 56S/32Q/28D; Singles – Doubles	(Belgium) Justine Henin-Hardenne; 6–3, 4–6, 6–3	(Russia) Nadia Petrova	(Switzerland) Patty Schnyder (Serbia and Montenegro) Jelena Janković	(Russia) Maria Sharapova (Russia) Svetlana Kuznetsova (Russia) Elena Bovina (France) Amélie Mauresmo
2 May	Qatar Total German Open; Berlin, Germany; Tier I event Clay – $1,300,000 – 56S/32Q/28D; Singles – Doubles	(Russia) Elena Likhovtseva (Russia) Vera Zvonareva; 4–6, 6–4, 6–3	(Zimbabwe) Cara Black (South Africa) Liezel Huber	(Switzerland) Patty Schnyder (Serbia and Montenegro) Jelena Janković	(Russia) Maria Sharapova (Russia) Svetlana Kuznetsova (Russia) Elena Bovina (France) Amélie Mauresmo
2 May	GP de SAR La Princesse Lalla Meryem; Rabat, Morocco; Tier IV event Clay – $140,000 – 32S/32Q/16D; Singles – Doubles	(Spain) Nuria Llagostera Vives; 6–4, 6–2	(China) Zheng Jie	(China) Li Na (France) Émilie Loit	(Italy) Antonella Serra Zanetti (Italy) Tathiana Garbin (Spain) Lourdes Domínguez Lino (Spain) Arantxa Parra Santonja
2 May	GP de SAR La Princesse Lalla Meryem; Rabat, Morocco; Tier IV event Clay – $140,000 – 32S/32Q/16D; Singles – Doubles	(France) Émilie Loit (Czech Republic) Barbora Strýcová; 3–6, 7–6^{(7–5)}, 7–5	(Spain) Lourdes Domínguez Lino (Spain) Nuria Llagostera Vives	(China) Li Na (France) Émilie Loit	(Italy) Antonella Serra Zanetti (Italy) Tathiana Garbin (Spain) Lourdes Domínguez Lino (Spain) Arantxa Parra Santonja
9 May	Telecom Italia Masters Rome; Rome, Italy; Tier I event Clay – $1,300,000 – 56S/32Q/28D; Singles – Doubles	(France) Amélie Mauresmo; 2–6, 6–3, 6–4	(Switzerland) Patty Schnyder	(Russia) Maria Sharapova (Russia) Vera Zvonareva	(Russia) Elena Bovina (Russia) Evgenia Linetskaya (Italy) Francesca Schiavone (Spain) Conchita Martínez
9 May	Telecom Italia Masters Rome; Rome, Italy; Tier I event Clay – $1,300,000 – 56S/32Q/28D; Singles – Doubles	(Zimbabwe) Cara Black (South Africa) Liezel Huber; 6–0, 4–6, 6–1	(Russia) Maria Kirilenko (Spain) Anabel Medina Garrigues	(Russia) Maria Sharapova (Russia) Vera Zvonareva	(Russia) Elena Bovina (Russia) Evgenia Linetskaya (Italy) Francesca Schiavone (Spain) Conchita Martínez
9 May	ECM Prague Open; Prague, Czech Republic; Tier IV event Clay – $140,000 – 32S/30Q/16D; Singles – Doubles	(Russia) Dinara Safina; 7–6^{(7–2)}, 6–3	(Czech Republic) Zuzana Ondrášková	(Spain) Laura Pous Tió (Czech Republic) Klára Koukalová	(Czech Republic) Iveta Benešová (Puerto Rico) Kristina Brandi (Argentina) Mariana Díaz Oliva (United States) Jill Craybas
9 May	ECM Prague Open; Prague, Czech Republic; Tier IV event Clay – $140,000 – 32S/30Q/16D; Singles – Doubles	(France) Émilie Loit (Australia) Nicole Pratt; 6–7^{(6–8)}, 6–4, 6–4	(Croatia) Jelena Kostanić (Czech Republic) Barbora Strýcová	(Spain) Laura Pous Tió (Czech Republic) Klára Koukalová	(Czech Republic) Iveta Benešová (Puerto Rico) Kristina Brandi (Argentina) Mariana Díaz Oliva (United States) Jill Craybas
16 May	İstanbul Cup; Istanbul, Turkey; Tier III event Clay – $200,000 – 30S/24Q/16D; Singles – Doubles	(United States) Venus Williams; 6–3, 6–2	(Czech Republic) Nicole Vaidišová	(Bulgaria) Tsvetana Pironkova (Israel) Anna Smashnova	(Russia) Anna Chakvetadze (Israel) Shahar Pe'er (United States) Mashona Washington (Germany) Anna-Lena Grönefeld
16 May	İstanbul Cup; Istanbul, Turkey; Tier III event Clay – $200,000 – 30S/24Q/16D; Singles – Doubles	(Spain) Marta Marrero (Italy) Antonella Serra Zanetti; 6–4, 6–0	(Austria) Daniela Klemenschits (Austria) Sandra Klemenschits	(Bulgaria) Tsvetana Pironkova (Israel) Anna Smashnova	(Russia) Anna Chakvetadze (Israel) Shahar Pe'er (United States) Mashona Washington (Germany) Anna-Lena Grönefeld
16 May	Internationaux de Strasbourg; Strasbourg, France; Tier III event Clay – $170,000 – 30S/32Q/16D; Singles – Doubles	(Spain) Anabel Medina Garrigues; 6–4, 6–3	(Poland) Marta Domachowska	(France) Nathalie Dechy (Madagascar) Dally Randriantefy	(France) Stéphanie Cohen-Aloro (Russia) Vera Douchevina (Croatia) Karolina Šprem (China) Peng Shuai
16 May	Internationaux de Strasbourg; Strasbourg, France; Tier III event Clay – $170,000 – 30S/32Q/16D; Singles – Doubles	(Spain) Rosa María Andrés Rodríguez (Romania) Andreea Vanc; 6–3, 6–1	(Poland) Marta Domachowska (Germany) Marlene Weingärtner	(France) Nathalie Dechy (Madagascar) Dally Randriantefy	(France) Stéphanie Cohen-Aloro (Russia) Vera Douchevina (Croatia) Karolina Šprem (China) Peng Shuai
23 May; 30 May	French Open; Paris, France; Grand Slam; Clay – $5,301,154 – 128S/96Q/64D/32X; Singles – Doubles – Mixed doubles	(Belgium) Justine Henin-Hardenne; 6–1, 6–1	(France) Mary Pierce	(Russia) Elena Likhovtseva (Russia) Nadia Petrova	(United States) Lindsay Davenport (Bulgaria) Sesil Karatantcheva (Serbia and Montenegro) Ana Ivanovic (Russia) Maria Sharapova
23 May; 30 May	French Open; Paris, France; Grand Slam; Clay – $5,301,154 – 128S/96Q/64D/32X; Singles – Doubles – Mixed doubles	(Spain) Virginia Ruano Pascual (Argentina) Paola Suárez; 4–6, 6–3, 6–3	(Zimbabwe) Cara Black (South Africa) Liezel Huber	(Russia) Elena Likhovtseva (Russia) Nadia Petrova	(United States) Lindsay Davenport (Bulgaria) Sesil Karatantcheva (Serbia and Montenegro) Ana Ivanovic (Russia) Maria Sharapova
23 May; 30 May	French Open; Paris, France; Grand Slam; Clay – $5,301,154 – 128S/96Q/64D/32X; Singles – Doubles – Mixed doubles	(France) Fabrice Santoro (Slovakia) Daniela Hantuchová; 3–6, 6–3, 6–2	(India) Leander Paes (United States) Martina Navratilova	(Russia) Elena Likhovtseva (Russia) Nadia Petrova	(United States) Lindsay Davenport (Bulgaria) Sesil Karatantcheva (Serbia and Montenegro) Ana Ivanovic (Russia) Maria Sharapova

=== June ===
Week	Tournament	Champions	Runners-up	Semifinalists	Quarterfinalists
6 Jun	DFS Classic; Birmingham, Great Britain; Tier III event Grass – $200,000 – 56S/32Q/16D; Singles – Doubles	(Russia) Maria Sharapova; 6–2, 4–6, 6–1	(Serbia and Montenegro) Jelena Janković	(France) Tatiana Golovin (United States) Laura Granville	(Greece) Eleni Daniilidou (Russia) Anna Chakvetadze (United States) Mashona Washington (Thailand) Tamarine Tanasugarn
6 Jun	DFS Classic; Birmingham, Great Britain; Tier III event Grass – $200,000 – 56S/32Q/16D; Singles – Doubles	(Slovakia) Daniela Hantuchová (Japan) Ai Sugiyama; 6–2, 6–3	(Greece) Eleni Daniilidou (United States) Jennifer Russell	(France) Tatiana Golovin (United States) Laura Granville	(Greece) Eleni Daniilidou (Russia) Anna Chakvetadze (United States) Mashona Washington (Thailand) Tamarine Tanasugarn
13 Jun	Hastings Direct International Champs. Eastbourne, Great Britain; Tier II event Grass – $585,000 – 28S/32Q/16D; Singles – Doubles	(Belgium) Kim Clijsters; 7–5, 6–0	(Russia) Vera Dushevina	(Italy) Roberta Vinci (Russia) Svetlana Kuznetsova	(France) Marion Bartoli (Russia) Anastasia Myskina (United States) Mashona Washington (France) Nathalie Dechy
13 Jun	Hastings Direct International Champs. Eastbourne, Great Britain; Tier II event Grass – $585,000 – 28S/32Q/16D; Singles – Doubles	(United States) Lisa Raymond (Australia) Rennae Stubbs; 6–3, 7–5	(Russia) Elena Likhovtseva (Russia) Vera Zvonareva	(Italy) Roberta Vinci (Russia) Svetlana Kuznetsova	(France) Marion Bartoli (Russia) Anastasia Myskina (United States) Mashona Washington (France) Nathalie Dechy
13 Jun	Ordina Open 's-Hertogenbosch, Netherlands; Tier III event Grass – $170,000 – 32S/32Q/16D; Singles – Doubles	(Czech Republic) Klára Koukalová; 3–6, 6–2, 6–2	(Czech Republic) Lucie Šafářová	(United States) Meghann Shaughnessy (Argentina) Gisela Dulko	(Czech Republic) Denisa Chládková (Netherlands) Michaëlla Krajicek (Russia) Dinara Safina (Russia) Nadia Petrova
13 Jun	Ordina Open 's-Hertogenbosch, Netherlands; Tier III event Grass – $170,000 – 32S/32Q/16D; Singles – Doubles	(Spain) Anabel Medina Garrigues (Russia) Dinara Safina; 6–4, 2–6, 7–6(11)	(Czech Republic) Iveta Benešová (Spain) Nuria Llagostera Vives	(United States) Meghann Shaughnessy (Argentina) Gisela Dulko	(Czech Republic) Denisa Chládková (Netherlands) Michaëlla Krajicek (Russia) Dinara Safina (Russia) Nadia Petrova
20 Jun; 27 Jun	Wimbledon Championships; London, Great Britain; Grand Slam; Grass – $7,385,286 – 128S/96Q/64D/32X; Singles – Doubles – Mixed doubles	(United States) Venus Williams; 4–6, 7–6^{(7–4)}, 9–7	(United States) Lindsay Davenport	(France) Amélie Mauresmo (Russia) Maria Sharapova	(Russia) Svetlana Kuznetsova (Russia) Anastasia Myskina (France) Mary Pierce (Russia) Nadia Petrova
20 Jun; 27 Jun	Wimbledon Championships; London, Great Britain; Grand Slam; Grass – $7,385,286 – 128S/96Q/64D/32X; Singles – Doubles – Mixed doubles	(Zimbabwe) Cara Black (South Africa) Liezel Huber; 6–2, 6–1	(Russia) Svetlana Kuznetsova (France) Amélie Mauresmo	(France) Amélie Mauresmo (Russia) Maria Sharapova	(Russia) Svetlana Kuznetsova (Russia) Anastasia Myskina (France) Mary Pierce (Russia) Nadia Petrova
20 Jun; 27 Jun	Wimbledon Championships; London, Great Britain; Grand Slam; Grass – $7,385,286 – 128S/96Q/64D/32X; Singles – Doubles – Mixed doubles	(India) Mahesh Bhupathi (France) Mary Pierce; 6–4, 6–2	(Australia) Paul Hanley (Ukraine) Tatiana Perebiynis	(France) Amélie Mauresmo (Russia) Maria Sharapova	(Russia) Svetlana Kuznetsova (Russia) Anastasia Myskina (France) Mary Pierce (Russia) Nadia Petrova

=== July ===
Week	Tournament	Champions	Runners-up	Semifinalists	Quarterfinalists
4 Jul	Fed Cup: Semifinals; Moscow, Russia, Clay (i); Aix-en-Provence, France, Hard	Semifinal winners Russia 4–1; France 3–1	Semifinal losers United States; Spain		
11 Jul	Internazionali di Modena; Modena, Italy; Tier IV event Clay – $140,000 – 32S/32Q/16D; Singles – Doubles	(Israel) Anna Smashnova; 6–6 (3–0) ret.	(Italy) Tathiana Garbin	(Hungary) Ágnes Szávay (Italy) Flavia Pennetta	(Italy) Francesca Schiavone (Croatia) Sanda Mamić (France) Émilie Loit (Argentina) Mariana Díaz Oliva
11 Jul	Internazionali di Modena; Modena, Italy; Tier IV event Clay – $140,000 – 32S/32Q/16D; Singles – Doubles	(Ukraine) Yuliya Beygelzimer (Bosnia and Herzegovina) Mervana Jugić-Salkić; 6–2, 6–0	(Czech Republic) Gabriela Navrátilová (Czech Republic) Michaela Paštiková	(Hungary) Ágnes Szávay (Italy) Flavia Pennetta	(Italy) Francesca Schiavone (Croatia) Sanda Mamić (France) Émilie Loit (Argentina) Mariana Díaz Oliva
18 Jul	W&S Financial Group Women's Open; Mason, United States; Tier III event Hard – $170,000 – 32S/32Q/16D; Singles – Doubles	(Switzerland) Patty Schnyder; 6–4, 6–0	(Japan) Akiko Morigami	(United States) Bethanie Mattek (Slovakia) Daniela Hantuchová	(Israel) Shahar Pe'er (Serbia and Montenegro) Jelena Janković (South Korea) Cho Yoon-jeong (India) Sania Mirza
18 Jul	W&S Financial Group Women's Open; Mason, United States; Tier III event Hard – $170,000 – 32S/32Q/16D; Singles – Doubles	(United States) Laura Granville (United States) Abigail Spears; 3–6, 6–2, 6–4	(Czech Republic) Květa Peschke (Argentina) María Emilia Salerni	(United States) Bethanie Mattek (Slovakia) Daniela Hantuchová	(Israel) Shahar Pe'er (Serbia and Montenegro) Jelena Janković (South Korea) Cho Yoon-jeong (India) Sania Mirza
18 Jul	Internazionali Femminili di Palermo; Palermo, Italy; Tier IV event Clay – $140,000 – 32S/32Q/16D; Singles – Doubles	(Spain) Anabel Medina Garrigues; 6–4, 6–0	(Czech Republic) Klára Koukalová	(Bulgaria) Tsvetana Pironkova (Italy) Flavia Pennetta	(Italy) Nathalie Viérin (Argentina) Mariana Díaz Oliva (Germany) Martina Müller (Italy) Roberta Vinci
18 Jul	Internazionali Femminili di Palermo; Palermo, Italy; Tier IV event Clay – $140,000 – 32S/32Q/16D; Singles – Doubles	(Italy) Giulia Casoni (Ukraine) Mariya Koryttseva; 4–6, 6–3, 7–5	(Poland) Klaudia Jans (Poland) Alicja Rosolska	(Bulgaria) Tsvetana Pironkova (Italy) Flavia Pennetta	(Italy) Nathalie Viérin (Argentina) Mariana Díaz Oliva (Germany) Martina Müller (Italy) Roberta Vinci
25 Jul	Bank of the West Classic; Stanford, United States; Tier II event Hard – $585,000 – 28S/32Q/16D; Singles – Doubles	(Belgium) Kim Clijsters; 7–5, 6–2	(United States) Venus Williams	(Germany) Anna-Lena Grönefeld (Switzerland) Patty Schnyder	(France) Nathalie Dechy (Slovakia) Daniela Hantuchová (Czech Republic) Iveta Benešová (Serbia and Montenegro) Jelena Janković
25 Jul	Bank of the West Classic; Stanford, United States; Tier II event Hard – $585,000 – 28S/32Q/16D; Singles – Doubles	(Zimbabwe) Cara Black (Australia) Rennae Stubbs; 6–3, 7–5	(Russia) Elena Likhovtseva (Russia) Vera Zvonareva	(Germany) Anna-Lena Grönefeld (Switzerland) Patty Schnyder	(France) Nathalie Dechy (Slovakia) Daniela Hantuchová (Czech Republic) Iveta Benešová (Serbia and Montenegro) Jelena Janković
25 Jul	Tippmix Budapest Grand Prix; Budapest, Hungary; Tier IV event Clay – $140,000 – 32S/32Q/16D; Singles – Doubles	(Israel) Anna Smashnova; 6–2, 6–2	(Colombia) Catalina Castaño	(Croatia) Jelena Kostanić (Spain) Laura Pous Tió	(Hungary) Anikó Kapros (Spain) María Sánchez Lorenzo (Slovakia) Martina Suchá (Slovenia) Katarina Srebotnik
25 Jul	Tippmix Budapest Grand Prix; Budapest, Hungary; Tier IV event Clay – $140,000 – 32S/32Q/16D; Singles – Doubles	(France) Émilie Loit (Slovenia) Katarina Srebotnik; 6–1, 3–6, 6–2	(Spain) Lourdes Domínguez Lino (Spain) Marta Marrero	(Croatia) Jelena Kostanić (Spain) Laura Pous Tió	(Hungary) Anikó Kapros (Spain) María Sánchez Lorenzo (Slovakia) Martina Suchá (Slovenia) Katarina Srebotnik

=== August ===
Week	Tournament	Champions	Runners-up	Semifinalists	Quarterfinalists
1 Aug	Acura Classic; San Diego, United States; Tier I event Hard – $1,300,000 – 56S/32Q/28D; Singles – Doubles	(France) Mary Pierce; 6–0, 6–3	(Japan) Ai Sugiyama	(China) Peng Shuai (Japan) Akiko Morigami	(Belgium) Kim Clijsters (Switzerland) Patty Schnyder (Russia) Anna Chakvetadze (Bulgaria) Sesil Karatantcheva
1 Aug	Acura Classic; San Diego, United States; Tier I event Hard – $1,300,000 – 56S/32Q/28D; Singles – Doubles	(Spain) Conchita Martínez (Spain) Virginia Ruano Pascual; 6–7^{(7–9)}, 6–1, 7–5	(Slovakia) Daniela Hantuchová (Japan) Ai Sugiyama	(China) Peng Shuai (Japan) Akiko Morigami	(Belgium) Kim Clijsters (Switzerland) Patty Schnyder (Russia) Anna Chakvetadze (Bulgaria) Sesil Karatantcheva
8 Aug	JPMorgan Chase Open; Carson, United States; Tier II event Hard – $585,000 – 56S/32Q/16D; Singles – Doubles	(Belgium) Kim Clijsters; 6–4, 6–1	(Slovakia) Daniela Hantuchová	(Russia) Elena Dementieva (Italy) Francesca Schiavone	(Russia) Maria Sharapova (Italy) Tathiana Garbin (Russia) Nadia Petrova (Spain) Conchita Martínez
8 Aug	JPMorgan Chase Open; Carson, United States; Tier II event Hard – $585,000 – 56S/32Q/16D; Singles – Doubles	(Russia) Elena Dementieva (Italy) Flavia Pennetta; 6–2, 6–4	(United States) Angela Haynes (United States) Bethanie Mattek	(Russia) Elena Dementieva (Italy) Francesca Schiavone	(Russia) Maria Sharapova (Italy) Tathiana Garbin (Russia) Nadia Petrova (Spain) Conchita Martínez
8 Aug	Nordea Nordic Light Open; Stockholm, Sweden; Tier IV event Hard – $140,000 – 32S/32Q/16D; Singles – Doubles	(Slovenia) Katarina Srebotnik; 7–5, 6–2	(Russia) Anastasia Myskina	(Russia) Vera Douchevina (France) Émilie Loit	(Slovakia) Martina Suchá (Colombia) Catalina Castaño (Spain) Arantxa Parra Santonja (Sweden) Sofia Arvidsson
8 Aug	Nordea Nordic Light Open; Stockholm, Sweden; Tier IV event Hard – $140,000 – 32S/32Q/16D; Singles – Doubles	(France) Émilie Loit (Slovenia) Katarina Srebotnik; 6–4, 6–3	(Czech Republic) Eva Birnerová (Italy) Mara Santangelo	(Russia) Vera Douchevina (France) Émilie Loit	(Slovakia) Martina Suchá (Colombia) Catalina Castaño (Spain) Arantxa Parra Santonja (Sweden) Sofia Arvidsson
15 Aug	Rogers Cup; Toronto, Canada; Tier I event Hard – $1,300,000 – 56S/48Q/28D; Singles – Doubles	(Belgium) Kim Clijsters; 7–5, 6–1	(Belgium) Justine Henin-Hardenne	(Russia) Anastasia Myskina (France) Amélie Mauresmo	(Argentina) Gisela Dulko (Italy) Flavia Pennetta (Czech Republic) Nicole Vaidišová (Russia) Nadia Petrova
15 Aug	Rogers Cup; Toronto, Canada; Tier I event Hard – $1,300,000 – 56S/48Q/28D; Singles – Doubles	(Germany) Anna-Lena Grönefeld (United States) Martina Navratilova; 5–7, 6–3, 6–4	(Spain) Conchita Martínez (Spain) Virginia Ruano Pascual	(Russia) Anastasia Myskina (France) Amélie Mauresmo	(Argentina) Gisela Dulko (Italy) Flavia Pennetta (Czech Republic) Nicole Vaidišová (Russia) Nadia Petrova
22 Aug	Pilot Pen Tennis; New Haven, United States; Tier II event Hard – $585,000 – 28S/32Q/16D; Singles – Doubles	(United States) Lindsay Davenport; 6–4, 6–4	(France) Amélie Mauresmo	(Russia) Anna Chakvetadze (Spain) Anabel Medina Garrigues	(Slovakia) Daniela Hantuchová (China) Zheng Jie (Russia) Elena Dementieva (Germany) Anna-Lena Grönefeld
22 Aug	Pilot Pen Tennis; New Haven, United States; Tier II event Hard – $585,000 – 28S/32Q/16D; Singles – Doubles	(United States) Lisa Raymond (Australia) Samantha Stosur; 6–2, 6–7^{(6–8)}, 6–1	(Argentina) Gisela Dulko (Russia) Maria Kirilenko	(Russia) Anna Chakvetadze (Spain) Anabel Medina Garrigues	(Slovakia) Daniela Hantuchová (China) Zheng Jie (Russia) Elena Dementieva (Germany) Anna-Lena Grönefeld
22 Aug	Forest Hills Tennis Classic; Forest Hills, United States; Tier IV event Hard – $74,800 – 16S; Singles	(Czech Republic) Lucie Šafářová; 3–6, 7–5, 6–4	(India) Sania Mirza	(United States) Alexa Glatch (Czech Republic) Iveta Benešová	(Slovakia) Martina Suchá (Italy) Roberta Vinci (Czech Republic) Zuzana Ondrášková (Italy) Antonella Serra Zanetti
29 Aug; 5 Sep	U.S. Open; New York City, United States; Grand Slam; Hard – $7,147,042 – 128S/96Q/64D/32X; Singles – Doubles – Mixed doubles	(Belgium) Kim Clijsters; 6–3, 6–1	(France) Mary Pierce	(Russia) Maria Sharapova (Russia) Elena Dementieva	(Russia) Nadia Petrova (United States) Venus Williams (France) Amélie Mauresmo (United States) Lindsay Davenport
29 Aug; 5 Sep	U.S. Open; New York City, United States; Grand Slam; Hard – $7,147,042 – 128S/96Q/64D/32X; Singles – Doubles – Mixed doubles	(United States) Lisa Raymond (Australia) Samantha Stosur; 6–2, 5–7, 6–3	(Russia) Elena Dementieva (Italy) Flavia Pennetta	(Russia) Maria Sharapova (Russia) Elena Dementieva	(Russia) Nadia Petrova (United States) Venus Williams (France) Amélie Mauresmo (United States) Lindsay Davenport
29 Aug; 5 Sep	U.S. Open; New York City, United States; Grand Slam; Hard – $7,147,042 – 128S/96Q/64D/32X; Singles – Doubles – Mixed doubles	(India) Mahesh Bhupathi (Slovakia) Daniela Hantuchová; 6–4, 6–2	(Serbia and Montenegro) Nenad Zimonjić (Slovenia) Katarina Srebotnik	(Russia) Maria Sharapova (Russia) Elena Dementieva	(Russia) Nadia Petrova (United States) Venus Williams (France) Amélie Mauresmo (United States) Lindsay Davenport

=== September ===
Week	Tournament	Champions	Runners-up	Semifinalists	Quarterfinalists
12 Sep	Fed Cup: Final; Paris, France, Clay	Russia; 3–2	France		
12 Sep	Wismilak International; Bali, Indonesia; Tier III event Hard – $225,000 – 30S/15Q/16D; Singles – Doubles	(United States) Lindsay Davenport; 6–2, 6–4	(Italy) Francesca Schiavone	(China) Li Na (Switzerland) Patty Schnyder	(Italy) Maria Elena Camerin (Ukraine) Alona Bondarenko (Italy) Flavia Pennetta (Japan) Aiko Nakamura
12 Sep	Wismilak International; Bali, Indonesia; Tier III event Hard – $225,000 – 30S/15Q/16D; Singles – Doubles	(Germany) Anna-Lena Grönefeld (United States) Meghann Shaughnessy; 6–3, 6–3	(China) Yan Zi (China) Zheng Jie	(China) Li Na (Switzerland) Patty Schnyder	(Italy) Maria Elena Camerin (Ukraine) Alona Bondarenko (Italy) Flavia Pennetta (Japan) Aiko Nakamura
19 Sep	China Open; Beijing, China; Tier II event Hard – $585,000 – 28S/32Q/16D; Singles – Doubles	(Russia) Maria Kirilenko; 6–3, 6–4	(Germany) Anna-Lena Grönefeld	(Russia) Maria Sharapova (Poland) Marta Domachowska	(Japan) Shinobu Asagoe (China) Sun Tiantian (United States) Venus Williams (China) Peng Shuai
19 Sep	China Open; Beijing, China; Tier II event Hard – $585,000 – 28S/32Q/16D; Singles – Doubles	(Spain) Nuria Llagostera Vives (Venezuela) María Vento-Kabchi; 6–2, 6–4	(China) Yan Zi (China) Zheng Jie	(Russia) Maria Sharapova (Poland) Marta Domachowska	(Japan) Shinobu Asagoe (China) Sun Tiantian (United States) Venus Williams (China) Peng Shuai
19 Sep	Sunfeast Open; Kolkata, India; Tier III event Hard (i) – $170,000 – 32S/10Q/16D; Singles – Doubles	(Russia) Anastasia Myskina; 6–2, 6–2	(Croatia) Karolina Šprem	(Estonia) Kaia Kanepi (Russia) Elena Likhovtseva	(India) Shikha Uberoi (Austria) Sybille Bammer (Hungary) Melinda Czink (Sweden) Sofia Arvidsson
19 Sep	Sunfeast Open; Kolkata, India; Tier III event Hard (i) – $170,000 – 32S/10Q/16D; Singles – Doubles	(Russia) Elena Likhovtseva (Russia) Anastasia Myskina; 6–1, 6–0	(United States) Neha Uberoi (India) Shikha Uberoi	(Estonia) Kaia Kanepi (Russia) Elena Likhovtseva	(India) Shikha Uberoi (Austria) Sybille Bammer (Hungary) Melinda Czink (Sweden) Sofia Arvidsson
19 Sep	Banka Koper Slovenia Open; Portorož, Slovenia; Tier IV event Hard – $140,000 – 32S/32Q/16D; Singles – Doubles	(Czech Republic) Klára Koukalová; 6–2, 4–6, 6–3	(Slovenia) Katarina Srebotnik	(Germany) Vanessa Henke (Greece) Eleni Daniilidou	(United States) Meilen Tu (Italy) Roberta Vinci (France) Séverine Brémond (Spain) Anabel Medina Garrigues
19 Sep	Banka Koper Slovenia Open; Portorož, Slovenia; Tier IV event Hard – $140,000 – 32S/32Q/16D; Singles – Doubles	(Spain) Anabel Medina Garrigues (Italy) Roberta Vinci; 6–4, 5–7, 6–2	(Croatia) Jelena Kostanić (Slovenia) Katarina Srebotnik	(Germany) Vanessa Henke (Greece) Eleni Daniilidou	(United States) Meilen Tu (Italy) Roberta Vinci (France) Séverine Brémond (Spain) Anabel Medina Garrigues
26 Sep	Fortis Championships Luxembourg; Kockelscheuer, Luxembourg; Tier II event Hard (i) – $585,000 – 28S/32Q/16D; Singles – Doubles	(Belgium) Kim Clijsters; 6–2, 6–4	(Germany) Anna-Lena Grönefeld	(France) Nathalie Dechy (Russia) Dinara Safina	(Italy) Francesca Schiavone (Slovakia) Daniela Hantuchová (Italy) Roberta Vinci (Russia) Nadia Petrova
26 Sep	Fortis Championships Luxembourg; Kockelscheuer, Luxembourg; Tier II event Hard (i) – $585,000 – 28S/32Q/16D; Singles – Doubles	(United States) Lisa Raymond (Australia) Samantha Stosur; 7–5, 6–1	(Zimbabwe) Cara Black (Australia) Rennae Stubbs	(France) Nathalie Dechy (Russia) Dinara Safina	(Italy) Francesca Schiavone (Slovakia) Daniela Hantuchová (Italy) Roberta Vinci (Russia) Nadia Petrova
26 Sep	Guangzhou International; Guangzhou, China; Tier III event Hard – $170,000 – 32S/16Q/16D; Singles – Doubles	(China) Yan Zi; 6–4, 4–0 ret.	(Spain) Nuria Llagostera Vives	(China) Zheng Jie (Belarus) Victoria Azarenka	(China) Li Ting (Russia) Maria Kirilenko (China) Li Na (China) Peng Shuai
26 Sep	Guangzhou International; Guangzhou, China; Tier III event Hard – $170,000 – 32S/16Q/16D; Singles – Doubles	(Italy) Maria Elena Camerin (Switzerland) Emmanuelle Gagliardi; 7–6^{(7–5)}, 6–3	(United States) Neha Uberoi (India) Shikha Uberoi	(China) Zheng Jie (Belarus) Victoria Azarenka	(China) Li Ting (Russia) Maria Kirilenko (China) Li Na (China) Peng Shuai
26 Sep	Hansol Korea Open Tennis Championships; Seoul, South Korea; Tier IV event Hard – $140,000 – 32S/32Q/16D; Singles – Doubles	(Czech Republic) Nicole Vaidišová; 7–5, 6–3	(Serbia and Montenegro) Jelena Janković	(France) Tatiana Golovin (Colombia) Catalina Castaño	(Russia) Vera Douchevina (Japan) Ai Sugiyama (United States) Laura Granville (France) Marion Bartoli
26 Sep	Hansol Korea Open Tennis Championships; Seoul, South Korea; Tier IV event Hard – $140,000 – 32S/32Q/16D; Singles – Doubles	(Chinese Taipei) Chan Yung-jan (Chinese Taipei) Chuang Chia-jung; 6–2, 6–4	(United States) Jill Craybas (South Africa) Natalie Grandin	(France) Tatiana Golovin (Colombia) Catalina Castaño	(Russia) Vera Douchevina (Japan) Ai Sugiyama (United States) Laura Granville (France) Marion Bartoli

=== October ===
Week	Tournament	Champions	Runners-up	Semifinalists	Quarterfinalists
3 Oct	Porsche Tennis Grand Prix; Filderstadt, Germany; Tier II event Hard (i) – $650,000 – 28S/32Q/16D; Singles – Doubles	(United States) Lindsay Davenport; 6–2, 6–4	(France) Amélie Mauresmo	(Slovakia) Daniela Hantuchová (Russia) Elena Dementieva	(Russia) Anastasia Myskina (Italy) Flavia Pennetta (Russia) Nadia Petrova (Belgium) Kim Clijsters
3 Oct	Porsche Tennis Grand Prix; Filderstadt, Germany; Tier II event Hard (i) – $650,000 – 28S/32Q/16D; Singles – Doubles	(Slovakia) Daniela Hantuchová (Russia) Anastasia Myskina; 6–0, 3–6, 7–5	(Czech Republic) Květa Peschke (Italy) Francesca Schiavone	(Slovakia) Daniela Hantuchová (Russia) Elena Dementieva	(Russia) Anastasia Myskina (Italy) Flavia Pennetta (Russia) Nadia Petrova (Belgium) Kim Clijsters
3 Oct	AIG Japan Open; Tokyo, Japan; Tier III event Hard – $170,000 – 32S/32Q/16D; Singles – Doubles	(Czech Republic) Nicole Vaidišová; 7–6^{(7–4)}, 3–2 ret.	(France) Tatiana Golovin	(India) Sania Mirza (Russia) Maria Kirilenko	(Russia) Vera Zvonareva (Japan) Ai Sugiyama (United States) Jill Craybas (Sweden) Sofia Arvidsson
3 Oct	AIG Japan Open; Tokyo, Japan; Tier III event Hard – $170,000 – 32S/32Q/16D; Singles – Doubles	(Argentina) Gisela Dulko (Russia) Maria Kirilenko; 7–5, 4–6, 6–3	(Japan) Shinobu Asagoe (Venezuela) María Vento-Kabchi	(India) Sania Mirza (Russia) Maria Kirilenko	(Russia) Vera Zvonareva (Japan) Ai Sugiyama (United States) Jill Craybas (Sweden) Sofia Arvidsson
3 Oct	Tashkent Open; Tashkent, Uzbekistan; Tier IV event Hard – $145,000 – 32S/16Q/16D; Singles – Doubles	(Netherlands) Michaëlla Krajicek; 6–0, 4–6, 6–3	(Uzbekistan) Akgul Amanmuradova	(Russia) Ekaterina Bychkova (Italy) Maria Elena Camerin	(Russia) Evgeniya Rodina (Ukraine) Kateryna Bondarenko (Italy) Antonella Serra Zanetti (Russia) Elena Vesnina
3 Oct	Tashkent Open; Tashkent, Uzbekistan; Tier IV event Hard – $145,000 – 32S/16Q/16D; Singles – Doubles	(Italy) Maria Elena Camerin (France) Émilie Loit; 6–3, 6–0	(Russia) Anastasia Rodionova (Russia) Galina Voskoboeva	(Russia) Ekaterina Bychkova (Italy) Maria Elena Camerin	(Russia) Evgeniya Rodina (Ukraine) Kateryna Bondarenko (Italy) Antonella Serra Zanetti (Russia) Elena Vesnina
10 Oct	Kremlin Cup; Moscow, Russia; Tier I event Carpet (i) – $1,340,000 – 28S/32Q/16D; Singles – Doubles	(France) Mary Pierce; 6–4, 6–3	(Italy) Francesca Schiavone	(Russia) Dinara Safina (Russia) Elena Dementieva	(Russia) Maria Sharapova (Russia) Elena Likhovtseva (Russia) Anastasia Myskina (Russia) Svetlana Kuznetsova
10 Oct	Kremlin Cup; Moscow, Russia; Tier I event Carpet (i) – $1,340,000 – 28S/32Q/16D; Singles – Doubles	(United States) Lisa Raymond (Australia) Samantha Stosur; 6–2, 6–4	(Zimbabwe) Cara Black (Australia) Rennae Stubbs	(Russia) Dinara Safina (Russia) Elena Dementieva	(Russia) Maria Sharapova (Russia) Elena Likhovtseva (Russia) Anastasia Myskina (Russia) Svetlana Kuznetsova
10 Oct	PTT Thailand Open; Bangkok, Thailand; Tier III event Hard – $200,000 – 32S/32Q/16D; Singles – Doubles	(Czech Republic) Nicole Vaidišová; 6–1, 6–7^{(5–7)}, 7–5	(Russia) Nadia Petrova	(Italy) Antonella Serra Zanetti (Argentina) Gisela Dulko	(France) Stéphanie Foretz (Israel) Shahar Pe'er (China) Yuan Meng (Spain) Conchita Martínez
10 Oct	PTT Thailand Open; Bangkok, Thailand; Tier III event Hard – $200,000 – 32S/32Q/16D; Singles – Doubles	(Japan) Shinobu Asagoe (Argentina) Gisela Dulko; 6–1, 7–5	(Spain) Conchita Martínez (Spain) Virginia Ruano Pascual	(Italy) Antonella Serra Zanetti (Argentina) Gisela Dulko	(France) Stéphanie Foretz (Israel) Shahar Pe'er (China) Yuan Meng (Spain) Conchita Martínez
17 Oct	Zurich Open; Zürich, Switzerland; Tier I event Hard (i) – $1,340,000 – 28S/32Q/16D; Singles – Doubles	(United States) Lindsay Davenport; 7–6^{(7–5)}, 6–3	(Switzerland) Patty Schnyder	(Russia) Anastasia Myskina (Serbia and Montenegro) Ana Ivanovic	(Italy) Francesca Schiavone (Russia) Elena Dementieva (Italy) Flavia Pennetta (Slovenia) Katarina Srebotnik
17 Oct	Zurich Open; Zürich, Switzerland; Tier I event Hard (i) – $1,340,000 – 28S/32Q/16D; Singles – Doubles	(Zimbabwe) Cara Black (Australia) Rennae Stubbs; 6–7^{(6–8)}, 7–6^{(7–4)}, 6–3	(Slovakia) Daniela Hantuchová (Japan) Ai Sugiyama	(Russia) Anastasia Myskina (Serbia and Montenegro) Ana Ivanovic	(Italy) Francesca Schiavone (Russia) Elena Dementieva (Italy) Flavia Pennetta (Slovenia) Katarina Srebotnik
24 Oct	Generali Ladies Linz; Linz, Austria; Tier II event Hard (i) – $585,000 – 28S/32Q/16D; Singles – Doubles	(Russia) Nadia Petrova; 4–6, 6–3, 6–1	(Switzerland) Patty Schnyder	(Serbia and Montenegro) Ana Ivanovic (Czech Republic) Květa Peschke	(France) Tatiana Golovin (Slovakia) Daniela Hantuchová (Austria) Sybille Bammer (Japan) Ai Sugiyama
24 Oct	Generali Ladies Linz; Linz, Austria; Tier II event Hard (i) – $585,000 – 28S/32Q/16D; Singles – Doubles	(Argentina) Gisela Dulko (Czech Republic) Květa Peschke; 6–2, 6–3	(Spain) Conchita Martínez (Spain) Virginia Ruano Pascual	(Serbia and Montenegro) Ana Ivanovic (Czech Republic) Květa Peschke	(France) Tatiana Golovin (Slovakia) Daniela Hantuchová (Austria) Sybille Bammer (Japan) Ai Sugiyama
24 Oct	Gaz de France Stars; Hasselt, Belgium; Tier III event Hard (i) – $170,000 – 32S/32Q/16D; Singles – Doubles	(Belgium) Kim Clijsters; 6–2, 6–3	(Italy) Francesca Schiavone	(Russia) Dinara Safina (Netherlands) Michaëlla Krajicek	(Germany) Julia Schruff (Slovenia) Katarina Srebotnik (Australia) Samantha Stosur (France) Nathalie Dechy
24 Oct	Gaz de France Stars; Hasselt, Belgium; Tier III event Hard (i) – $170,000 – 32S/32Q/16D; Singles – Doubles	(France) Émilie Loit (Slovenia) Katarina Srebotnik; 6–3, 6–4	(Netherlands) Michaëlla Krajicek (Hungary) Ágnes Szávay	(Russia) Dinara Safina (Netherlands) Michaëlla Krajicek	(Germany) Julia Schruff (Slovenia) Katarina Srebotnik (Australia) Samantha Stosur (France) Nathalie Dechy
31 Oct	Advanta Championships; Philadelphia, United States; Tier II event Hard (i) – $585,000 – 28S/32Q/16D; Singles – Doubles	(France) Amélie Mauresmo; 7–5, 2–6, 7–5	(Russia) Elena Dementieva	(Russia) Nadia Petrova (Czech Republic) Nicole Vaidišová	(Slovakia) Martina Suchá (Czech Republic) Květa Peschke (United States) Mashona Washington (United States) Lisa Raymond
31 Oct	Advanta Championships; Philadelphia, United States; Tier II event Hard (i) – $585,000 – 28S/32Q/16D; Singles – Doubles	(Zimbabwe) Cara Black (Australia) Rennae Stubbs; 6–4, 7–6^{(7–4)}	(United States) Lisa Raymond (Australia) Samantha Stosur	(Russia) Nadia Petrova (Czech Republic) Nicole Vaidišová	(Slovakia) Martina Suchá (Czech Republic) Květa Peschke (United States) Mashona Washington (United States) Lisa Raymond
31 Oct	Bell Challenge; Quebec City, Canada; Tier III event Carpet (i) – $170,000 – 32S/32Q/16D; Singles – Doubles	(United States) Amy Frazier; 6–1, 7–5	(Sweden) Sofia Arvidsson	(France) Nathalie Dechy (France) Marion Bartoli	(Canada) Stéphanie Dubois (Slovakia) Henrieta Nagyová (Russia) Elena Vesnina (United States) Shenay Perry
31 Oct	Bell Challenge; Quebec City, Canada; Tier III event Carpet (i) – $170,000 – 32S/32Q/16D; Singles – Doubles	(Russia) Anastasia Rodionova (Russia) Elena Vesnina; 6–7^{(4–7)}, 6–4, 6–2	(Latvia) Līga Dekmeijere (United States) Ashley Harkleroad	(France) Nathalie Dechy (France) Marion Bartoli	(Canada) Stéphanie Dubois (Slovakia) Henrieta Nagyová (Russia) Elena Vesnina (United States) Shenay Perry

=== November ===
Week	Tournament	Champions	Runners-up	Semifinalists	Quarterfinalists
7 Nov	WTA Tour Championships; Los Angeles, United States; Year-end Championship; Hard – $3,000,000 – 8S (round robin)/4D; Singles – Doubles	(France) Amélie Mauresmo; 5–7, 7–6^{(7–3)}, 6–4	(France) Mary Pierce	(United States) Lindsay Davenport (Russia) Maria Sharapova	(Switzerland) Patty Schnyder (Russia) Nadia Petrova (Belgium) Kim Clijsters (Russia) Elena Dementieva
7 Nov	WTA Tour Championships; Los Angeles, United States; Year-end Championship; Hard – $3,000,000 – 8S (round robin)/4D; Singles – Doubles	(United States) Lisa Raymond (Australia) Samantha Stosur; 6–7^{(5–7)}, 7–5, 6–4	(Zimbabwe) Cara Black (Australia) Rennae Stubbs	(United States) Lindsay Davenport (Russia) Maria Sharapova	(Switzerland) Patty Schnyder (Russia) Nadia Petrova (Belgium) Kim Clijsters (Russia) Elena Dementieva

=== Titles won by nation ===
Total titles	Country	Grand Slam tournaments			Year-end championships		Tier I tournaments		Tier II tournaments		Tier III tournaments		Tier IV/V tournaments		All titles		
Total titles	Country	Singles	Doubles	Mixed	Singles	Doubles	Singles	Doubles	Singles	Doubles	Singles	Doubles	Singles	Doubles	Singles	Doubles	Mixed
20	Russia		1				1	2	4	2	3	6	1		9	11	
19	USA	2	1			1	1	2	4	3	3	2			10	9	
17	Australia		2	1		1		3	1	8				1	1	15	1
14	Belgium	2					5		5	1	1				13	1	
14	France			1	1		3		2			1		6	6	7	1
14	Spain		1					3		2	1	3	3	1	4	10	
11	Czech Republic									3	3		4	1	7	4	
10	Italy									2	2	1		4	2	8	
8	Slovenia											2	2	4	2	6	
6	USA		1					1		2		2				6	
6	Zimbabwe		1					2		3						6	
5	China										1		1	3	2	3	
5	Slovakia			2				1		1		1				5	2
4	Switzerland										2	2			2	2	
4	Ukraine									1		1		2		4	
4	Japan											3		1		4	
3	Germany							1				1		1		3	
2	Israel												2		2		
2	South Africa		1					1								2	
1	Netherlands												1		1		
1	India												1		1		
1	Serbia and Montenegro												1		1		
1	Venezuela									1						1	
1	Romania											1				1	
1	Chinese Taipei													1		1	
1	Bosnia and Herzegovina													1		1	

== Rankings ==
Below are the 2005 WTA year-end rankings in singles competition:

Singles Year-end Ranking
No.	Player name	Points	2004	Change
1	Lindsay Davenport (USA)	4910	1	0
2	Kim Clijsters (BEL)	4829	22	+20
3	Amélie Mauresmo (FRA)	4030	2	-1
4	Maria Sharapova (RUS)	3958	4	0
5	Mary Pierce (FRA)	3797	29	+24
6	Justine Henin-Hardenne (BEL)	2936	5	-1
7	Patty Schnyder (SUI)	2774	8	+1
8	Elena Dementieva (RUS)	2748	6	–2
9	Nadia Petrova (RUS)	2638	12	+3
10	Venus Williams (USA)	2628	9	–1
11	Serena Williams (USA)	1851	7	–4
12	Nathalie Dechy (FRA)	1773	21	+9
13	Francesca Schiavone (ITA)	1704	19	+6
14	Anastasia Myskina (RUS)	1616	3	–11
15	Nicole Vaidišová (CZE)	1581	75	+60
16	Ana Ivanovic (SCG)	1551	101	+75
17	Elena Likhovtseva (RUS)	1519	24	+7
18	Svetlana Kuznetsova (RUS)	1491	5	–13
19	Daniela Hantuchová (SVK)	1486	31	+12
20	Dinara Safina (RUS)	1372	44	+24

=== Points distribution ===
Category	W	F	SF	QF	R16	R32	R64	R128	Q	Q3	Q2	Q1
Grand Slam (S)	650	456	292	162	90	56	32	2	26	21	12.5	2
Grand Slam (D)	650	456	292	162	90	56	2	–	22	–	–	–
WTA Championships (S)	485	340	218	121	67	–	–	–	–	–	–	–
WTA Championships (D)	485	340	218	121	–	–	–	–	–	–	–	–
Tier I $2,000,000 (S)	325	228	146	81	45	28	16	1	11	–	6.25	1
Tier I $2,000,000 (D)	325	228	146	81	45	1	–	–	20	–	–	–
Tier I $1,300,000 (56S)	300	210	135	75	42	25	1	–	10.5	–	5.75	1
Tier I $1,300,000 (28S)	300	210	135	75	42	1	–	–	18.5	10.5	5.75	1
Tier I $1,300,000 (28D)	300	210	135	75	42	1	–	–	18.5	–	–	–
Tier I $1,300,000 (16D)	300	210	135	75	1	–	–	–	19	–	–	–
Tier II $650,000 (28S)	220	154	99	55	29	1	–	–	13.25	7.75	4.5	1
Tier II $650,000 (16D)	220	154	99	55	1	–	–	–	13	–	–	–
Tier II $585,000 (56S)	195	137	88	49	25	14	1	–	6.75	–	4	1
Tier II $585,000 (28S)	195	137	88	49	25	1	–	–	11.75	6.75	4	1
Tier II $585,000 (16D)	195	137	88	49	1	–	–	–	11.75	–	–	–
Tier III $225,000 (30S)	145	103	66	37	19	1	–	–	4.5	–	2.75	1
Tier III $225,000 (16D)	145	103	66	37	1	–	–	–	–	–	–	–
Tier III $170,000 (56S)	120	85	55	30	16	9	1	–	3.75	–	2.25	1
Tier III $170,000 (30/32S, 32Q)	120	85	55	30	16	1	–	–	7.25	3.75	2.25	1
Tier III $170,000 (32S, 16Q)	120	85	55	30	16	1	–	–	3.75	–	2.25	1
Tier III $170,000 (16D)	120	85	55	30	1	–	–	–	7.5	–	–	–
Tier IV $140,000 (32S, 32Q)	95	67	43	24	12	1	–	–	5.5	3.5	2	1
Tier IV $140,000 (32S, 16Q)	95	67	43	24	12	1	–	–	3.5	–	2	1
Tier IV $140,000 (16S, 16D)	95	67	43	24	1	–	–	–	6.25	–	–	–
Tier V $110,000 (S)	80	56	36	20	10	1	–	–	4.5	3	2	1
Tier V $110,000 (D)	80	56	36	20	1	–	–	–	5	–	–	–

== Statistics ==
Number of singles titles:
9	Kim Clijsters	Belgium
6	Lindsay Davenport	USA
4	Justine Henin	Belgium
	Amélie Mauresmo	France
3	Maria Sharapova	Russia
	Nicole Vaidišová	Czech Republic
2	Mary Pierce	France			Klára Koukalová	Czech Republic
	Flavia Pennetta	Italy
	Lucie Šafářová	Czech Republic
	Dinara Safina	Russia
	Patty Schnyder	Switzerland
	Venus Williams	USA
List of players who won their first WTA-singles title this year:
1.	Ana Ivanovic	Serbia & Montenegro	Canberra, Australia
2.	Jie Zheng	China	Hobart, Australia
3.	Sania Mirza	India	Hyderabad, India
4.	Lucie Šafářová	Czech Republic	Oeiras, Portugal
5.	Nuria Llagostera Vives	Spain	Rabat, Morocco
6.	Klára Koukalová	Czech Republic	Rosmalen, Netherlands
7.	Maria Kirilenko	Russia	Beijing, China
8.	Zi Yan	China	Guangzhou, China
9.	Michaëlla Krajicek	Netherlands	Tashkent, Uzbekistan
10.	Nadia Petrova	Russia	Linz, Austria
List of players who reached their first WTA-singles final this year:
1.	Samantha Stosur	Australia	Gold Coast, Australia	L
2.	Ana Ivanovic	Serbia & Montenegro	Canberra, Australia	W
3.	Melinda Czink	Hungary	Canberra, Australia	L
4.	Jie Zheng	China	Hobart, Australia	W
5.	Gisela Dulko	Argentina	Hobart, Australia	L
6.	Anna-Lena Grönefeld	Germany	Pattaya, Thailand	L
7.	Sania Mirza	India	Hyderabad, India	W
8.	Alona Bondarenko	Ukraine	Hyderabad, India	L
9.	Lourdes Domínguez Lino	Spain	Bogotá, Colombia	L
10.	Lucie Šafářová	Czech Republic	Estoril, Portugal	W
11.	Nuria Llagostera Vives	Spain	Rabat, Morocco	W
12.	Zuzana Ondrášková	Czech Republic	Prague, Czech Republic	L
13.	Vera Douchevina	Russia	Eastbourne, UK	L
14.	Maria Kirilenko	Russia	Beijing, China	W
15.	Zi Yan	China	Gangzhou, China	W
16.	Michaëlla Krajicek	Netherlands	Tashkent, Uzbekistan	W
17.	Akgul Ammanmoeradova	Uzbekistan	Tashkent, Uzbekistan	L
18.	Sofia Arvidsson	Sweden	Quebec, Canada	L
List of players who defended their WTA-singles title this year:
1.	Vera Zvonareva	Russia	Memphis, USA (Tier III)
2.	Lindsay Davenport	USA	Amelia Island, USA (Tier II)
3.	Amélie Mauresmo	France	Rome, Italy (Tier I)
4.	Maria Sharapova	Russia	Birmingham (Tier III)
5.	Anabel Medina Garrigues	Spain	Palermo (Tier III)
6.	Lindsay Davenport	USA	Filderstadt (Tier II)
7.	Amélie Mauresmo	France	Philadelphia, USA (Tier II)
Winner/Runners-up by country:
1.	Belgium	13–1
2.	Russia	9–7
3.	USA	8–6
4.	Czech Republic	7–3
5.	France	6–7
6.	Spain	3–2
7.	Italy	2–4
=	China	2–2
9.	Australia	1–3
10.	Serbia & Montenegro	1–2
11.	India	1–1
=	Switzerland	1–2

== See also ==
- 2005 ATP Tour
