= 2005 WTA Tour Championships =

- Date: November 8–13
- Edition: 35th
- Category: Year-end championships
- Draw: 8S (round robin) / 4D
- Prize money: $3,000,000
- Surface: Hard / indoor
- Location: Los Angeles, United States
- Venue: Staples Center

Champions

Singles
- (France) Amélie Mauresmo

Doubles
- (United States) Lisa Raymond / (Australia) Samantha Stosur
← 2004 ·	WTA Finals	· 2006 →

The 2005 WTA Tour Championships, also known as the Sony Ericsson Championships, was a women's round robin tennis tournament played on indoor hard courts at the Staples Center in Los Angeles, United States. It was the 35th edition of the year-end singles championships, the 30th edition of the year-end doubles championships, and was part of the 2005 WTA Tour. The tournament was held between November 8 and November 13, 2005. Fourth-seeded Amélie Mauresmo won the singles event, the first French player to win the title, and she earned $1,000,000 first-prize money as well as 485 ranking points.

Justine Henin-Hardenne had qualified for the tournament but withdrew due to a hamstring injury.

== Finals ==
=== Singles ===
(France) Amélie Mauresmo defeated (France) Mary Pierce, 5–7, 7–6^{(7–3)}, 6–4.

=== Doubles ===
(United States) Lisa Raymond / (Australia) Samantha Stosur defeated (Zimbabwe) Cara Black / (Australia) Rennae Stubbs, 6–7^{(5–7)}, 7–5, 6–4.

== Singles Championship Race ==
=== Singles ===
Players in gold have qualified for Los Angeles. Players in brown withdrawn. The low-ranked players in blue after them would be played as alternates in Los Angeles.

Rank	Player	1	2	3	4	5	6	7	8	9	10	11	12	13	14	15	16	17	Total points	Tourn
1	(Belgium) Kim Clijsters	W 650+372	W 325+286	W 325+202	W 300+110	W 195+108	W 195+99	W 195+96	W 195+91	W 120+78	R16; 90+58	SF; 88+47	R16; 90+26	QF; 75+31	QF; 49+50	QF; 55+8	R16; 42+14		4,665	16
2	(United States) Lindsay Davenport	F 456+334	F 456+206	W 300+124	W 220+136	F 228+114	W 195+114	W 195+109	QF; 162+122	F 210+60	W 195+73	QF; 162+102	W 145+37	QF; 75+3	QF; 49+23	R16; 1			4,606	15
3	(Russia) Maria Sharapova	SF; 292+184	SF; 292+178	W 300+148	SF; 292+150	F 228+80	W 195+88	QF; 162+60	SF; 135+68	SF; 146+44	W 120+64	SF; 88+20	QF; 75+23	QF; 75+18	QF; 49+23				3,597	14
4	(France) Amélie Mauresmo	SF; 292+148	W 300+119	W 195+136	W 195+85	QF; 162+112	F 154+109	QF; 162+56	SF; 146+56	F 137+65	SF; 135+61	F 137+53	SF; 88+12	QF; 75+20	R32; 56+8	R32; 28+8	R16; 1	R16; 1	3,313	18
4	(France) Amélie Mauresmo	R16; 1																	3,313	18
5	(France) Mary Pierce	F 456+438	F 456+378	W 300+105	W 300+96	QF; 162+96	QF; 81+47	R16; 42+31	R16; 42+14	R16; 25+15	R16; 25+10	R32; 25+8	R16; 25+5	R128; 2					3,184	13
6	(Belgium) Justine Henin-Hardenne	W 650+434	W 300+214	W 300+171	F 210+97	W 195+104	QF; 81+55	R16; 90+32	R128; 2	R16; 1									2,936	9
7	(Switzerland) Patty Schnyder	F 210+103	F 210+69	QF; 162+106	SF; 135+76	F 137+54	R16; 90+82	SF; 88+75	SF; 135+24	W 120+35	W 120+22	R16; 90+32	SF; 88+23	QF; 75+25	QF; 49+38	SF; 66+12	QF; 49+10	R16; 42+15	2,905	25
7	(Switzerland) Patty Schnyder	QF; 49+1	R16; 29+23	R16; 25+10	R16; 25+8	R16; 25+8	R32; 28+4	R128; 2	R16; 1										2,905	25
8	(Russia) Nadia Petrova	SF; 292+128	F 210+114	W 195+61	QF; 162+62	QF; 162+36	SF; 88+53	R16; 90+48	QF; 55+58	F 85+22	SF; 88+14	SF; 88+7	QF; 75+20	QF; 75+18	QF; 49+23	QF; 49+19	QF; 49+10	R16; 45+14	2,769	24
8	(Russia) Nadia Petrova	R16; 42+10	R16; 42+2	QF; 30+8	R16; 25+10	QF; 30+4	R64; 1	R32; 1											2,769	24
9	(Russia) Elena Dementieva	SF; 292+348	F 210+59	SF; 146+74	SF; 99+105	SF; 135+45	F 137+17	R16; 90+46	SF; 88+45	QF; 81+48	R16; 90+36	R16; 90+32	SF; 88+26	QF; 75+35	QF; 75+4	QF; 49+15	R32; 1	R32; 1	2,684	19
9	(Russia) Elena Dementieva	R16; 1	R16; 1																2,684	19
10	(United States) Venus Williams	W 650+470	QF; 162+160	SF; 146+84	F 137+66	F 137+55	R16; 90+70	W 120+24	R32; 56+28	QF; 49+16	QF; 49+8	R16; 42+8	R32; 1						2,628	12
11	(France) Nathalie Dechy	SF; 292+272	R16; 90+38	SF; 88+31	R16; 90+28	QF; 81+20	R32; 56+24	R16; 42+35	QF; 49+23	SF; 55+12	QF; 49+17	R16; 42+23	QF; 49+16	R16; 29+35	SF; 55+8	QF; 30+14	R16; 25+15	R16; 25+15	1,887	26
11	(France) Nathalie Dechy	R32; 28+10	R16; 25+10	R32; 25+10	R32; 1	R32; 1	R64; 1	R64; 1	R32; 1	R32; 1									1,887	26
12	(United States) Serena Williams	W 650+558	SF; 88+58	R16; 90+48	QF; 81+35	QF; 49+25	R32; 56+12	QF; 49+4	R16; 42+4	R32; 1	R16; 1								1,851	10
