= 2005 Fortis Championships Luxembourg =

- Date: 26 September – 2 October
- Edition: 10th
- Category: Tier II
- Draw: 28S / 16D
- Prize money: $585,000
- Surface: Hard / indoor
- Location: Kockelscheuer, Luxembourg

Champions

Singles
- (Belgium) Kim Clijsters

Doubles
- (United States) Lisa Raymond / (Australia) Samantha Stosur
- Luxembourg Open

The 2005 Fortis Championships Luxembourg was a women's tennis tournament played on indoor hard courts in Kockelscheuer, Luxembourg which was part of Tier II of the 2005 WTA Tour. It was the 10th edition of the tournament and was held from 26 September until 2 October 2005. First-seeded Kim Clijsters won the singles title, her fifth in total at the event, and earned $93,000 first-prize money.

== Finals ==
=== Singles ===
(Belgium) Kim Clijsters defeated (Germany) Anna-Lena Grönefeld, 6–2, 6–4

- This was Clijsters' 8th singles title of the year and the 29th of her career.

=== Doubles ===
(United States) Lisa Raymond / (Australia) Samantha Stosur defeated (Zimbabwe) Cara Black / (Australia) Rennae Stubbs, 7–5, 6–1
