= 2005 Proximus Diamond Games =

- Date: 14–20 February
- Edition: 4th
- Category: WTA Tier II
- Draw: 28S / 16D
- Prize money: USD 585,000
- Surface: Hard / indoor
- Location: Antwerp, Belgium
- Venue: Sportpaleis

Champions

Singles
- (France) Amélie Mauresmo

Doubles
- (Zimbabwe) Cara Black / (Belgium) Els Callens
← 2004 ·	Diamond Games	· 2006 →

The 2005 Proximus Diamond Games was a women's professional tennis tournament played on indoor hard courts at the Sportpaleis in Antwerp, Belgium that was part of the Tier II category of the 2005 WTA Tour. It was the fourth edition of the tournament and was held from 14 February until 20 February 2002. First-seeded Amélie Mauresmo won the singles title and earned $93,000 first-prize money.

== Finals ==
=== Singles ===
(France) Amélie Mauresmo defeated (United States) Venus Williams, 4–6, 7–5, 6–4

=== Doubles ===
(Zimbabwe) Cara Black / (Belgium) Els Callens defeated (Spain) Anabel Medina Garrigues / (Russia) Dinara Safina, 3–6, 6–4, 6–4
