= 2005 WTA Tour Championships – Singles =

Singles
- 2005 WTA Tour Championships

Final
- Champion: (France) Amélie Mauresmo
- Runner-up: (France) Mary Pierce
- Score: 5–7, 7–6^{(7–3)}, 6–4

Details
- Draw: 8 (RR + elimination)
- Seeds: 8

Events
Singles	Doubles
- WTA Tour Championships

Amélie Mauresmo defeated Mary Pierce in the final, 5–7, 7–6^{(7–3)}, 6–4 to win the singles tennis title at the 2005 WTA Tour Championships.

Maria Sharapova was the defending champion, but lost in the semifinals to Mauresmo.

== Seeds ==
1. (1) (United States) Lindsay Davenport (semifinals)
2. (2) (Belgium) Kim Clijsters (round robin)
3. (3) (Russia) Maria Sharapova (semifinals)
4. (4) (France) Amélie Mauresmo (champion)
5. (5) (France) Mary Pierce (final)
6. (8) (Switzerland) Patty Schnyder (round robin)
7. (9) (Russia) Nadia Petrova (round robin)
8. (10) (Russia) Elena Dementieva (round robin)

Note:

- (Belgium) Justine Henin-Hardenne had qualified but pulled out due a hamstring injury.

== Alternates ==
1. (United States) Venus Williams (not used)
2. (France) Nathalie Dechy (not used)

== Draw ==
Key

- Q = Qualifier
- WC = Wild card
- LL = Lucky loser
- Alt = Alternate
- ITF = ITF entry
- PR = Protected ranking
- SR = Special ranking
- SE = Special exempt
- JE = Junior exempt
- JR = Junior Accelerator Programme entrant
- CO = College Accelerator Programme entrant
- NG = Next Gen Accelerator Program entrant
- w/o = Walkover
- r = Retired
- d = Defaulted

=== Finals ===
Semifinals
5	(France) Mary Pierce	7^{7}	7^{8}
1	(United States) Lindsay Davenport	6^{5}	6^{6}
3	(Russia) Maria Sharapova	6^{1}	3
4	(France) Amélie Mauresmo	7^{7}	6

Final
5	(France) Mary Pierce	7	6^{3}	4
4	(France) Amélie Mauresmo	5	7^{7}	6

=== Black group ===
		(Belgium) Clijsters	(France) Mauresmo	(France) Pierce	(Russia) Dementieva	RR; W–L	Set; W–L	Game; W–L	Standings
2	(Belgium) Kim Clijsters		3–6, 6–7^{(4–7)}	1–6, 6–4, 6–7^{(2–7)}	6–2, 6–3	1–2	3–4		3
4	(France) Amélie Mauresmo	6–3, 7–6^{(7–4)}		6–2, 4–6, 2–6	6–2, 6–3	2–1	5–2		2
5	(France) Mary Pierce	6–1, 4–6, 7–6^{(7–2)}	2–6, 6–4, 6–2		6–2, 6–3	3–0	6–2		1
8	(Russia) Elena Dementieva	2–6, 3–6	2–6, 3–6	2–6, 3–6		0–3	0–6		4

Standings are determined by: 1. number of wins; 2. number of matches; 3. in two-players-ties, head-to-head records; 4. in three-players-ties, percentage of sets won, or of games won; 5. steering-committee decision.

=== Green group ===
		(United States) Davenport	(Russia) Sharapova	(Switzerland) Schnyder	(Russia) Petrova	RR; W–L	Set; W–L	Game; W–L	Standings
1	(United States) Lindsay Davenport		3–6, 7–5, 4–6	6–3, 7–5	6–2, 7–6^{(7–1)}	2–1	5–2		2
3	(Russia) Maria Sharapova	6–3, 5–7, 6–4		6–1, 3–6, 6–3	1–6, 2–6	2–1	4–4		1
6	(Switzerland) Patty Schnyder	3–6, 5–7	1–6, 6–3, 3–6		6–0, 5–7, 6–4	1–2	3–5		3
7	(Russia) Nadia Petrova	2–6, 6–7^{(1–7)}	6–1, 6–2	0–6, 7–5, 4–6		1–2	3–4		4

Standings are determined by: 1. number of wins; 2. number of matches; 3. in two-players-ties, head-to-head records; 4. in three-players-ties, percentage of sets won, or of games won; 5. steering-committee decision.

== See also ==
- WTA Tour Championships appearances
