= 2005 Proximus Diamond Games – Doubles =

Doubles
- 2005 Proximus Diamond Games

Final
- Champions: (Zimbabwe) Cara Black (Belgium) Els Callens
- Runners-up: (Spain) Anabel Medina Garrigues (Russia) Dinara Safina
- Score: 3–6, 6–4, 6–4

Events
Singles	Doubles
← 2004 ·	Diamond Games	· 2006 →

Cara Black and Els Callens were the defending champions and successfully defended their title, by defeating Anabel Medina Garrigues and Dinara Safina 3–6, 6–4, 6–4 in the final.

== Seeds ==
1. (Zimbabwe) Cara Black / (Belgium) Els Callens (champions)
2. (Spain) Anabel Medina Garrigues / (Russia) Dinara Safina (final)
3. (France) Caroline Dhenin / (Czech Republic) Gabriela Navrátilová (semifinals)
4. (Croatia) Jelena Kostanić / (Luxembourg) Claudine Schaul (first round)

== Draw ==
=== Key ===
- Q = Qualifier
- WC = Wild card
- LL = Lucky loser
- Alt = Alternate
- SE = Special exempt
- PR = Protected ranking
- ITF = ITF entry
- JE = Junior exempt
- w/o = Walkover
- r = Retired
- d = Defaulted
- SR = Special ranking

=== Draw ===
First round
1	(Zimbabwe) C Black (Belgium) E Callens	6	6
WC	(Belgium) L Butkiewicz (Belgium) C Maes	3	1
PR	(Germany) B Rittner (Germany) A Roesch	3	6^{4}
(Latvia) L Dekmeijere (Japan) N Miyagi	6	7^{7}
3	(France) C Dhenin (Czech Republic) G Navrátilová	7^{7}	7^{7}
WC	(Switzerland) MG Mikaelian (France) M Pierce	6^{4}	6^{4}
(France) V Razzano (Spain) M Serna	7^{7}	3	1
(Czech Republic) D Chládková (Slovenia) T Križan	6^{4}	6	6
(Czech Republic) I Benešová (Czech Republic) K Peschke	6	2	6
(Germany) M Müller (Germany) J Schruff	2	6	4
(Canada) M Drake (Germany) V Henke	6^{5}	6	6
4	(Croatia) J Kostanić (Luxembourg) C Schaul	7^{7}	4	3
(Italy) F Lubiani (Spain) M Marrero	3	6^{3}
Q	(Republic of Ireland) C Curran (Netherlands) K Kilsdonk	6	7^{7}
(Italy) ME Camerin (Italy) T Garbin	3	1
2	(Spain) A Medina Garrigues (Russia) D Safina	6	6

Quarterfinals
1	(Zimbabwe) C Black (Belgium) E Callens	6	6
(Latvia) L Dekmeijere (Japan) N Miyagi	1	3
3	(France) C Dhenin (Czech Republic) G Navrátilová	7^{7}	6
(Czech Republic) D Chládková (Slovenia) T Križan	6^{4}	2
(Czech Republic) I Benešová (Czech Republic) K Peschke	6	6
(Canada) M Drake (Germany) V Henke	0	0
Q	(Republic of Ireland) C Curran (Netherlands) K Kilsdonk	4	2
2	(Spain) A Medina Garrigues (Russia) D Safina	6	6

Semifinals
1	(Zimbabwe) C Black (Belgium) E Callens	6	6
3	(France) C Dhenin (Czech Republic) G Navrátilová	3	2
(Czech Republic) I Benešová (Czech Republic) K Peschke	6	6^{6}	3
2	(Spain) A Medina Garrigues (Russia) D Safina	1	7^{8}	6

Final
1	(Zimbabwe) C Black (Belgium) E Callens	3	6	6
2	(Spain) A Medina Garrigues (Russia) D Safina	6	4	4
