= 2005 Fortis Championships Luxembourg – Doubles =

Doubles
- 2005 Fortis Championships Luxembourg

Final
- Champions: (United States) Lisa Raymond (Australia) Samantha Stosur
- Runners-up: (Zimbabwe) Cara Black (Australia) Rennae Stubbs
- Score: 7–5, 6–1

Details
- Draw: 16 (1Q/1LL)
- Seeds: 4

Events
Singles	Doubles
← 2004 ·	Luxembourg Open	· 2006 →

Virginia Ruano Pascual and Paola Suárez were the defending champions, but did not compete this year. Suárez went under a hip surgery in July 2005, missing the remainder of the season.

Lisa Raymond and Samantha Stosur won the title by defeating Cara Black and Rennae Stubbs 7–5, 6–1 in the final.

== Seeds ==
1. (Zimbabwe) Cara Black / (Australia) Rennae Stubbs (final)
2. (United States) Lisa Raymond / (Australia) Samantha Stosur (champions)
3. (Spain) Anabel Medina Garrigues / (Russia) Dinara Safina (semifinals)
4. (Czech Republic) Květa Peschke / (Italy) Francesca Schiavone (semifinals, retired due to a rib injury on Schiavone)

== Draw ==
Key

- Q = Qualifier
- WC = Wild card
- LL = Lucky loser
- Alt = Alternate
- ITF = ITF entry
- PR = Protected ranking
- SR = Special ranking
- SE = Special exempt
- JE = Junior exempt
- JR = Junior Accelerator Programme entrant
- CO = College Accelerator Programme entrant
- NG = Next Gen Accelerator Program entrant
- w/o = Walkover
- r = Retired
- d = Defaulted

=== Draw ===
First round
1	(Zimbabwe) C Black (Australia) R Stubbs	6	6
(United States) M Tu (Germany) J Wöhr	2	1
(Greece) E Daniilidou (United States) J Russell	6	6
(Czech Republic) D Chládková (Czech Republic) M Paštiková	1	3
4	(Czech Republic) K Peschke (Italy) F Schiavone	6	6
LL	(Belgium) K Flipkens (Luxembourg) A Kremer	0	1
(France) N Dechy (Argentina) ME Salerni	2	4
(Czech Republic) E Birnerová (Romania) A Vanc	6	6
(United Kingdom) C Curran (Czech Republic) V Uhlířová	1	0
(Slovenia) K Srebotnik (Italy) R Vinci	6	6
(Austria) D Klemenschits (Austria) S Klemenschits	1	7^{7}	4
3	(Spain) A Medina Garrigues (Russia) D Safina	6	6^{2}	6
(Czech Republic) I Benešová (Croatia) J Kostanić	7^{7}	6
(Slovenia) T Križan (Tunisia) S Sfar	6^{3}	1
Q	(Ukraine) A Bondarenko (Ukraine) K Bondarenko	2	3
2	(United States) L Raymond (Australia) S Stosur	6	6

Quarterfinals
1	(Zimbabwe) C Black (Australia) R Stubbs	6	6
(Greece) E Daniilidou (United States) J Russell	2	4
4	(Czech Republic) K Peschke (Italy) F Schiavone	6	7^{7}
(Czech Republic) E Birnerová (Romania) A Vanc	3	6^{0}
(Slovenia) K Srebotnik (Italy) R Vinci	3	5
3	(Spain) A Medina Garrigues (Russia) D Safina	6	7
(Czech Republic) I Benešová (Croatia) J Kostanić	3	3
2	(United States) L Raymond (Australia) S Stosur	6	6

Semifinals
1	(Zimbabwe) C Black (Australia) R Stubbs	4	6
4	(Czech Republic) K Peschke (Italy) F Schiavone	6	1	r
3	(Spain) A Medina Garrigues (Russia) D Safina	2	3
2	(United States) L Raymond (Australia) S Stosur	6	6

Final
1	(Zimbabwe) C Black (Australia) R Stubbs	5	1
2	(United States) L Raymond (Australia) S Stosur	7	6
