= 2005 WTA Tour Championships – Doubles =

Doubles
- 2005 WTA Tour Championships

Final
- Champions: (United States) Lisa Raymond (Australia) Samantha Stosur
- Runners-up: (Zimbabwe) Cara Black (Australia) Rennae Stubbs
- Score: 6–7^{(5–7)}, 7–5, 6–4

Details
- Draw: 4
- Seeds: 2

Events
Singles	Doubles
- WTA Tour Championships

Lisa Raymond and Samantha Stosur defeated Cara Black and Rennae Stubbs in the final, 6–7^{(5–7)}, 7–5, 6–4 to win the doubles tennis title at the 2005 WTA Tour Championships.

Nadia Petrova and Meghann Shaughnessy were the reigning champions, but did not qualify this year.

This marked the final professional appearance for 1994 Wimbledon champion Conchita Martínez before her retirement in 2006. Partnering Virginia Ruano Pascual, she was defeated by Raymond and Stosur in the semifinals.

== Seeds ==
1. (Zimbabwe) Cara Black / (Australia) Rennae Stubbs (final)
2. (United States) Lisa Raymond / (Australia) Samantha Stosur (champions)

== Draw ==
Key

- Q = Qualifier
- WC = Wild card
- LL = Lucky loser
- Alt = Alternate
- ITF = ITF entry
- PR = Protected ranking
- SR = Special ranking
- SE = Special exempt
- JE = Junior exempt
- JR = Junior Accelerator Programme entrant
- CO = College Accelerator Programme entrant
- NG = Next Gen Accelerator Program entrant
- w/o = Walkover
- r = Retired
- d = Defaulted

=== Finals ===
Semifinals
1	(Zimbabwe) Cara Black (Australia) Rennae Stubbs	6	7^{7}
(Russia) Elena Likhovtseva (Russia) Vera Zvonareva	4	6^{4}
(Spain) Conchita Martínez (Spain) Virginia Ruano Pascual	5	7	3
2	(United States) Lisa Raymond (Australia) Samantha Stosur	7	5	6

Final
1	(Zimbabwe) Cara Black (Australia) Rennae Stubbs	7^{7}	5	4
2	(United States) Lisa Raymond (Australia) Samantha Stosur	6^{5}	7	6
