= 2005 Fortis Championships Luxembourg – Singles =

Singles
- 2005 Fortis Championships Luxembourg

Final
- Champion: (Belgium) Kim Clijsters
- Runner-up: (Germany) Anna-Lena Grönefeld
- Score: 6–2, 6–4

Details
- Draw: 28 (3WC/4Q)
- Seeds: 8

Events
Singles	Doubles
- Luxembourg Open

Alicia Molik was the defending champion, but did not compete this year.

Kim Clijsters won the title by defeating Anna-Lena Grönefeld 6–2, 6–4 in the final.

== Seeds ==
The first four seeds received a bye into the second round.

1. (Belgium) Kim Clijsters (champion)
2. (Russia) Nadia Petrova (quarterfinals)
3. (Switzerland) Patty Schnyder (second round)
4. (France) Nathalie Dechy (semifinals)
5. (Slovakia) Daniela Hantuchová (quarterfinals)
6. (Italy) Francesca Schiavone (quarterfinals)
7. (Russia) Dinara Safina (semifinals)
8. (Italy) Silvia Farina Elia (first round)

== Draw ==
Key

- Q = Qualifier
- WC = Wild card
- LL = Lucky loser
- Alt = Alternate
- ITF = ITF entry
- PR = Protected ranking
- SR = Special ranking
- SE = Special exempt
- JE = Junior exempt
- JR = Junior Accelerator Programme entrant
- CO = College Accelerator Programme entrant
- NG = Next Gen Accelerator Program entrant
- w/o = Walkover
- r = Retired
- d = Defaulted

=== Finals ===
Semifinals
1	(Belgium) Kim Clijsters	6	6
4	(France) Nathalie Dechy	3	1
7	(Russia) Dinara Safina	4	7	4
(Germany) Anna-Lena Grönefeld	6	5	6

Final
1	(Belgium) Kim Clijsters	6	6
(Germany) Anna-Lena Grönefeld	2	4

=== Top half ===
First round
(Czech Republic) K Koukalová	7	4	6
(Czech Republic) I Benešová	5	6	3
Q	(Germany) S Klösel	6	5	4
(France) V Razzano	3	7	6
WC	(United States) L Raymond	4	3
6	(Italy) F Schiavone	6	6
(Madagascar) D Randriantefy	6	6
Q	(United States) M Tu	1	2
WC	(Bulgaria) M Maleeva	5	6	4
(Russia) A Chakvetadze	7	2	6
(Spain) A Medina Garrigues	7^{7}	6^{2}	0
5	(Slovakia) D Hantuchová	6^{2}	7^{7}	6

Second round
1	(Belgium) K Clijsters	6	6
(Czech Republic) K Koukalová	3	0
(France) V Razzano	2	r
6	(Italy) F Schiavone	6
4	(France) N Dechy	6	6
(Madagascar) D Randriantefy	1	2
(Russia) A Chakvetadze	4	1
5	(Slovakia) D Hantuchová	6	6

Quarterfinals
1	(Belgium) K Clijsters	6	7
6	(Italy) F Schiavone	4	5
4	(France) N Dechy	6	6
5	(Slovakia) D Hantuchová	1	4

Semifinals
1	(Belgium) K Clijsters	6	6
4	(France) N Dechy	3	1

=== Bottom half ===
First round
7	(Russia) D Safina	7	6
WC	(Luxembourg) A Kremer	5	2
Q	(Slovakia) J Gajdošová	7^{7}	6
(Slovenia) K Srebotnik	6^{4}	4
Q	(Netherlands) M Krajicek	6^{6}	4
(Italy) R Vinci	7^{8}	6
8	(Italy) S Farina Elia	2	0
(Israel) A Smashnova	6	6
(Greece) E Daniilidou	4	4
(Germany) AL Grönefeld	6	6
(Australia) S Stosur	7^{7}	5	1
(Czech Republic) K Peschke	6^{1}	7	6

Second round
7	(Russia) D Safina	6	6
Q	(Slovakia) J Gajdošová	3	1
(Italy) R Vinci	7^{7}	5	6
3	(Switzerland) P Schnyder	6^{2}	7	4
(Israel) A Smashnova	1	2
(Germany) AL Grönefeld	6	6
(Czech Republic) K Peschke	3	1
2	(Russia) N Petrova	6	6

Quarterfinals
7	(Russia) D Safina	5	6	6
(Italy) R Vinci	7	3	4
(Germany) AL Grönefeld	2	6	6
2	(Russia) N Petrova	6	3	2

Semifinals
7	(Russia) D Safina	4	7	4
(Germany) AL Grönefeld	6	5	6
