= 2005 Proximus Diamond Games – Singles =

Singles
- 2005 Proximus Diamond Games

Final
- Champion: (France) Amélie Mauresmo
- Runner-up: (United States) Venus Williams
- Score: 4–6, 7–5, 6–4

Details
- Draw: 28
- Seeds: 8

Events
Singles	Doubles
- Diamond Games

Kim Clijsters was the defending champion, but lost in quarterfinals to Venus Williams.

Amélie Mauresmo won the title, defeating Williams in the final 4–6, 7–5, 6–4.

== Seeds ==
The first four seeds received a bye into the second round.

1. (France) Amélie Mauresmo (champion)
2. (Russia) Anastasia Myskina (semifinals)
3. (United States) Venus Williams (final)
4. (Australia) Alicia Molik (semifinals)
5. (Russia) Nadia Petrova (second round)
6. (France) Nathalie Dechy (first round)
7. (Switzerland) Patty Schnyder (quarterfinals)
8. (Croatia) Karolina Šprem (first round)

== Draw ==
Key

- Q = Qualifier
- WC = Wild card
- LL = Lucky loser
- Alt = Alternate
- ITF = ITF entry
- PR = Protected ranking
- SR = Special ranking
- SE = Special exempt
- JE = Junior exempt
- JR = Junior Accelerator Programme entrant
- CO = College Accelerator Programme entrant
- NG = Next Gen Accelerator Program entrant
- w/o = Walkover
- r = Retired
- d = Defaulted

=== Finals ===
Semifinals
1	(France) Amélie Mauresmo	6	7^{7}
4	(Australia) Alicia Molik	3	6^{2}
3	(United States) Venus Williams	6	3	6
2	(Russia) Anastasia Myskina	3	6	3

Final
1	(France) Amélie Mauresmo	4	7	6
3	(United States) Venus Williams	6	5	4

=== Top half ===
First round
(Czech Republic) I Benešová	2	1
(France) M Pierce	6	6
Q	(France) C Pin	6	6
(Spain) M Marrero	1	2
(Czech Republic) D Chládková	3	5
7	(Switzerland) P Schnyder	6	7
(Bulgaria) M Maleeva	6	6
(Italy) T Garbin	4	4
LL	(Luxembourg) C Schaul	6	6
WC	(Belgium) E Callens	3	4
(Czech Republic) K Koukalová	7^{9}	6
WC/6	(France) N Dechy	6^{7}	4

Second round
1	(France) A Mauresmo	6	6
(France) M Pierce	4	1
Q	(France) C Pin	3	6	1
7	(Switzerland) P Schnyder	6	4	6
4	(Australia) A Molik	4	6	7^{9}
(Bulgaria) M Maleeva	6	2	6^{7}
LL	(Luxembourg) C Schaul	4	3
(Czech Republic) K Koukalová	6	6

Quarterfinals
1	(France) A Mauresmo	4	6	6
7	(Switzerland) P Schnyder	6	4	3
4	(Australia) A Molik	6	6
(Czech Republic) K Koukalová	3	4

Semifinals
1	(France) A Mauresmo	6	7^{7}
4	(Australia) A Molik	3	6^{2}

=== Bottom half ===
First round
5	(Russia) N Petrova	6	6
(Spain) A Medina Garrigues	4	1
(Belgium) K Clijsters	6	6
(Croatia) J Kostanić	2	3
Q	(Serbia and Montenegro) A Ivanovic	3	6	3
WC	(France) V Razzano	6	2	6
8	(Croatia) K Šprem	5	3
Q	(Russia) A Chakvetadze	7	6
(Italy) ME Camerin	6	2	4
Q	(Slovenia) K Srebotnik	3	6	6
(France) T Golovin	6	6^{10}	6
(Russia) D Safina	4	7^{12}	3

Second round
5	(Russia) N Petrova	5	7^{7}	1
(Belgium) K Clijsters	7	6^{3}	6
WC	(France) V Razzano	3	0
3	(United States) V Williams	6	6
Q	(Russia) A Chakvetadze	6	1	6^{12}
Q	(Slovenia) K Srebotnik	4	6	7^{14}
(France) T Golovin	3	7^{8}	4
2	(Russia) A Myskina	6	6^{6}	6

Quarterfinals
(Belgium) K Clijsters	2	3
3	(United States) V Williams	6	6
Q	(Slovenia) K Srebotnik	6^{6}	2
2	(Russia) A Myskina	7^{8}	6

Semifinals
3	(United States) V Williams	6	3	6
2	(Russia) A Myskina	3	6	3
