= 2005 Pacific Life Open – Women's singles =

Women's singles
- 2005 Pacific Life Open

Final
- Champion: (Belgium) Kim Clijsters
- Runner-up: (United States) Lindsay Davenport
- Score: 6–4, 4–6, 6–2

Details
- Draw: 96 (8WC/12Q/1LL)
- Seeds: 32

Events
Singles	men	women
Doubles	men	women
- Indian Wells Masters

Kim Clijsters defeated Lindsay Davenport in the final, 6–4, 4–6, 6–2 to win the women's singles tennis title at the 2005 Indian Wells Masters. Clijsters was unseeded due to not having played for much of the prior season, and defeated world No. 1 Davenport to win the title.

Justine Henin was the reigning champion, but did not participate this year.

== Seeds ==
All seeds received a bye into the second round.

1. (United States) Lindsay Davenport (final)
2. (France) Amélie Mauresmo (third round)
3. (Russia) Maria Sharapova (semifinals)
4. (Russia) Elena Dementieva (semifinals)
5. (Russia) Svetlana Kuznetsova (quarterfinals)
6. (Russia) Nadia Petrova (fourth round)
7. (France) Nathalie Dechy (quarterfinals)
8. (Russia) Elena Bovina (second round)
9. (Italy) Francesca Schiavone (second round)
10. (Russia) Elena Likhovtseva (second round)
11. (Croatia) Karolina Šprem (second round)
12. (Argentina) Paola Suárez (second round)
13. (Slovakia) Daniela Hantuchová (third round)
14. (France) Tatiana Golovin (fourth round)
15. (Italy) Flavia Pennetta (second round)
16. (Japan) Shinobu Asagoe (second round)
17. (United States) Amy Frazier (third round)
18. (Serbia and Montenegro) Jelena Janković (second round)
19. (Colombia) Fabiola Zuluaga (fourth round)
20. (France) Mary Pierce (quarterfinals)
21. (Argentina) Gisela Dulko (second round)
22. (France) Marion Bartoli (second round)
23. (Spain) Conchita Martínez (quarterfinals)
24. (Czech Republic) Iveta Benešová (third round)
25. (Russia) Dinara Safina (third round)
26. (Germany) Anna-Lena Grönefeld (second round)
27. (United States) Meghann Shaughnessy (third round)
28. (Spain) Anabel Medina Garrigues (third round)
29. (Australia) Samantha Stosur (third round)
30. (Russia) Eugenia Linetskaia (fourth round)
31. (United States) Lisa Raymond (third round)
32. (Venezuela) María Vento-Kabchi (third round)

== Draw ==
Key

- Q = Qualifier
- WC = Wild card
- LL = Lucky loser
- Alt = Alternate
- ITF = ITF entry
- PR = Protected ranking
- SR = Special ranking
- SE = Special exempt
- JE = Junior exempt
- JR = Junior Accelerator Programme entrant
- CO = College Accelerator Programme entrant
- NG = Next Gen Accelerator Program entrant
- w/o = Walkover
- r = Retired
- d = Defaulted

=== Finals ===
Quarterfinals
1	(United States) Lindsay Davenport	7^{7}	6
7	(France) Nathalie Dechy	6^{2}	0
3	(Russia) Maria Sharapova	6	6
20	(France) Mary Pierce	4	3
5	(Russia) Svetlana Kuznetsova	6	3	5
4	(Russia) Elena Dementieva	3	6	7
23	(Spain) Conchita Martínez	1	6	2
(Belgium) Kim Clijsters	6	3	6

Semifinals
1	(United States) Lindsay Davenport	6	6
3	(Russia) Maria Sharapova	0	0
4	(Russia) Elena Dementieva	4	2
(Belgium) Kim Clijsters	6	6

Final
1	(United States) Lindsay Davenport	4	6	2
(Belgium) Kim Clijsters	6	4	6

=== Top half ===
==== Section 1 ====
First round
WC	(Bulgaria) S Karatantcheva	6^{5}	6	6
(Germany) M Weingärtner	7^{7}	0	2
Q	(India) S Uberoi	6	7
(Japan) A Morigami	4	5
WC	(Czech Republic) D Bedáňová	6	3	6
(Czech Republic) K Peschke	3	6	3
WC	(Ukraine) V Kutuzova	7^{7}	6
(Switzerland) E Gagliardi	6^{4}	4

Second round
1	(United States) L Davenport	6	6
WC	(Bulgaria) S Karatantcheva	3	2
Q	(India) S Uberoi	5	1
27	(United States) M Shaughnessy	7	6
17	(United States) A Frazier	6	6^{4}	6
WC	(Czech Republic) D Bedáňová	3	7^{7}	2
WC	(Ukraine) V Kutuzova	7^{7}	4	6
15	(Italy) F Pennetta	6^{4}	6	3

Third round
1	(United States) L Davenport	6	2	6
27	(United States) M Shaughnessy	2	6	2
17	(United States) A Frazier	3	3
WC	(Ukraine) V Kutuzova	6	6

Fourth round
1	(United States) L Davenport	6	6
WC	(Ukraine) V Kutuzova	1	4

==== Section 2 ====
First round
WC	(United States) A Glatch	1	2
(United States) J Craybas	6	6
WC	(United States) J Kirkland	6	0	7^{7}
Q	(Russia) G Voskoboeva	2	6	6^{4}
(Spain) M Marrero	6	0	3
(South Korea) Y-j Cho	2	6	6
(Hungary) P Mandula	3	0
(France) É Loit	6	6

Second round
10	(Russia) E Likhovtseva	1	4
(United States) J Craybas	6	6
WC	(United States) J Kirkland	6	6
22	(France) M Bartoli	0	1
29	(Australia) S Stosur	7	6
(South Korea) Y-j Cho	5	3
(France) É Loit	2	6	3
7	(France) N Dechy	6	4	6

Third round
(United States) J Craybas	3	3
WC	(United States) J Kirkland	6	6
29	(Australia) S Stosur	4	7^{11}	6^{4}
7	(France) N Dechy	6	6^{9}	7^{7}

Fourth round
WC	(United States) J Kirkland	5	2
7	(France) N Dechy	7	6

==== Section 3 ====
First round
WC	(United States) A Haynes	6	6
(Italy) M Santangelo	4	4
(Czech Republic) M Paštiková	6	2	3
(United States) L Lee-Waters	2	6	6
(Spain) M Sánchez Lorenzo	7	6
(Luxembourg) C Schaul	5	0
(Luxembourg) A Kremer	6	6
WC	(Russia) A Kleybanova	4	4

Second round
3	(Russia) M Sharapova	6	6
WC	(United States) A Haynes	1	2
(United States) L Lee-Waters	2	4
25	(Russia) D Safina	6	6
19	(Colombia) F Zuluaga	6	7
(Spain) M Sánchez Lorenzo	2	5
(Luxembourg) A Kremer	6	3	5
13	(Slovakia) D Hantuchová	4	6	7

Third round
3	(Russia) M Sharapova	6	6
25	(Russia) D Safina	2	3
19	(Colombia) F Zuluaga	6	6
13	(Slovakia) D Hantuchová	3	2

Fourth round
3	(Russia) M Sharapova	4	6	7
19	(Colombia) F Zuluaga	6	2	5

==== Section 4 ====
First round
(Czech Republic) N Vaidišová	7^{7}	6
(United States) M Washington	6^{4}	4
Q	(Belarus) A Yakimova	6	2	2
(Slovakia) Ľ Cervanová	2	6	6
LL	(Ukraine) A Bondarenko	6	2	6
(Slovenia) K Srebotnik	4	6	3
(Czech Republic) B Strýcová	6	3	1
Q	(Italy) An Serra Zanetti	2	6	6

Second round
11	(Croatia) K Šprem	1	6	1
(Czech Republic) N Vaidišová	6	3	6
(Slovakia) Ľ Cervanová	6	1	5
20	(France) M Pierce	2	6	7
31	(United States) L Raymond	4	6	6
LL	(Ukraine) A Bondarenko	6	3	3
Q	(Italy) An Serra Zanetti	0	1
6	(Russia) N Petrova	6	6

Third round
(Czech Republic) N Vaidišová	4	4
20	(France) M Pierce	6	6
31	(United States) L Raymond	7^{9}	3	3
6	(Russia) N Petrova	6^{7}	6	6

Fourth round
20	(France) M Pierce	6	6
6	(Russia) N Petrova	2	2

=== Bottom half ===
==== Section 5 ====
First round
Q	(Czech Republic) E Birnerová	6	6
(Thailand) T Tanasugarn	4	2
Q	(Croatia) S Talaja	6	6
(Spain) A Parra Santoja	2	0
(Spain) N Llagostera Vives	6	6
Q	(France) C Pin	4	0
(Russia) A Jidkova	3	3
Q	(Japan) R Fujiwara	6	6

Second round
5	(Russia) S Kuznetsova	6	6
Q	(Czech Republic) E Birnerová	3	2
Q	(Croatia) S Talaja	6	2	2
32	(Venezuela) M Vento-Kabchi	4	6	6
24	(Czech Republic) I Benešová	6	6
(Spain) N Llagostera Vives	0	2
Q	(Japan) R Fujiwara	6	7^{7}
9	(Italy) F Schiavone	3	6^{5}

Third round
5	(Russia) S Kuznetsova	6	6
32	(Venezuela) M Vento-Kabchi	2	1
24	(Czech Republic) I Benešová	6^{1}	6^{3}
Q	(Japan) R Fujiwara	7^{7}	7^{7}

Fourth round
5	(Russia) S Kuznetsova	6	6
Q	(Japan) R Fujiwara	3	2

==== Section 6 ====
First round
(France) V Razzano	3	0
(Ukraine) Y Fedak	6	6
(Puerto Rico) K Brandi	4	2
Q	(Argentina) M Díaz Oliva	6	6
(Czech Republic) D Chládková	2	6^{1}
(France) S Beltrame	6	7^{7}
(United States) A Spears	4	6	7^{7}
(Slovakia) Ľ Kurhajcová	6	3	6^{0}

Second round
14	(France) T Golovin	6	7^{7}
(Ukraine) Y Fedak	3	6^{4}
Q	(Argentina) M Díaz Oliva	6	1	6
21	(Argentina) G Dulko	4	6	4
26	(Germany) A-L Grönefeld	3	6^{7}
(France) S Beltrame	6	7^{9}
(United States) A Spears	2	6^{5}
4	(Russia) E Dementieva	6	7^{7}

Third round
14	(France) T Golovin	6	2	6
Q	(Argentina) M Díaz Oliva	2	6	2
(France) S Beltrame	7	3	6^{5}
4	(Russia) E Dementieva	5	6	7^{7}

Fourth round
14	(France) T Golovin	6	4	4
4	(Russia) E Dementieva	2	6	6

==== Section 7 ====
First round
(Ukraine) T Perebiynis	0	1
Q	(Russia) M Kirilenko	6	6
Q	(Argentina) ME Salerni	3	6	4
(Poland) M Domachowska	6	3	6
(Spain) V Ruano Pascual	6^{6}	1
(Madagascar) D Randriantefy	7^{8}	6
(Germany) A Barna	6^{4}	4
WC	(United States) J Jackson	7^{7}	6

Second round
8	(Russia) E Bovina	3	1
Q	(Russia) M Kirilenko	6	6
(Poland) M Domachowska	3	2
28	(Spain) A Medina Garrigues	6	6
23	(Spain) C Martínez	6	6
(Madagascar) D Randriantefy	2	3
WC	(United States) J Jackson	7^{11}	7
12	(Argentina) P Suárez	6^{9}	5

Third round
Q	(Russia) M Kirilenko	6	6
28	(Spain) A Medina Garrigues	4	4
23	(Spain) C Martínez	6	7
WC	(United States) J Jackson	0	5

Fourth round
Q	(Russia) M Kirilenko	5	3
23	(Spain) C Martínez	7	6

==== Section 8 ====
First round
(Belgium) K Clijsters	6	6
(Australia) N Pratt	2	1
(Russia) A Chakvetadze	6	7
(Slovakia) M Suchá	0	5
(United States) M Irvin	3	6	4
(United States) L Granville	6	3	6
(Italy) T Garbin	6	6
(Hungary) A Kapros	1	2

Second round
16	(Japan) S Asagoe	3	3
(Belgium) K Clijsters	6	6
(Russia) A Chakvetadze	2	6	6
18	(Serbia and Montenegro) J Janković	6	2	4
30	(Russia) E Linetskaia	6	7^{7}
(United States) L Granville	2	6^{4}
(Italy) T Garbin	2	1
2	(France) A Mauresmo	6	6

Third round
(Belgium) K Clijsters	6	7^{7}
(Russia) A Chakvetadze	1	6^{4}
30	(Russia) E Linetskaia	2	6	7
2	(France) A Mauresmo	6	2	5

Fourth round
(Belgium) K Clijsters	6	6
30	(Russia) E Linetskaia	2	1

== Qualifying ==
=== Seeds ===
1. (Russia) Maria Kirilenko (qualified)
2. (Argentina) Mariana Díaz Oliva (qualifying competition)
3. (Ukraine) Alona Bondarenko (qualifying competition, Lucky loser)
4. (France) ~~Séverine Beltrame~~ (moved to Main Draw)
5. (France) Stéphanie Cohen-Aloro (first round)
6. (Italy) Antonella Serra Zanetti (qualified)
7. (United States) Lilia Osterloh (first round)
8. (Japan) Aiko Nakamura (first round)
9. (Czech Republic) ~~Michaela Paštiková~~ (moved to Main Draw)
10. (Croatia) Silvija Talaja (qualified)
11. (Germany) Julia Schruff (qualifying competition)
12. (France) Camille Pin (qualified)
13. (Switzerland) Emmanuelle Gagliardi (qualified)
14. (Colombia) Catalina Castaño (first round)
15. (Belarus) Anastasiya Yakimova (qualifying competition)
16. (Czech Republic) Sandra Kleinová (qualifying competition)
17. (Canada) Marie-Ève Pelletier (first round)
18. (Hungary) Melinda Czink (qualifying competition)
19. (United States) Jennifer Hopkins (first round)
20. (Czech Republic) Eva Birnerová (qualified)
21. (Czech Republic) Katerina Böhmová (first round)
22. (Spain) Laura Pous Tió (qualifying competition)
23. (United States) Kelly McCain (qualifying competition)
24. (Russia) Ekaterina Bychkova (qualifying competition)
25. (India) Shikha Uberoi (qualified)
26. (Russia) Galina Voskoboeva (qualified)

=== Qualifiers ===
1. (Russia) Maria Kirilenko
2. (Argentina) Mariana Díaz Oliva
3. (Belarus) Anastasiya Yakimova
4. (Russia) Galina Voskoboeva
5. (Japan) Rika Fujiwara
6. (Italy) Antonella Serra Zanetti
7. (Argentina) María Emilia Salerni
8. (Switzerland) Emmanuelle Gagliardi
9. (India) Shikha Uberoi
10. (Croatia) Silvija Talaja
11. (Czech Republic) Eva Birnerová
12. (France) Camille Pin

=== Lucky losers ===
1. (Ukraine) Alona Bondarenko

=== Qualifying draw ===
==== First qualifier ====
First round					Qualifying competition
1	(Russia) Maria Kirilenko	6^{4}	6	4
	(Slovenia) Tina Pisnik	7^{7}	3	0^{r}	1	(Russia) Maria Kirilenko	6	6
	(Spain) Paula García	3	6	3	23	(United States) Kelly McCain	1	3
23	(United States) Kelly McCain	6	4	6

==== Second qualifier ====
First round					Qualifying competition
2	(Argentina) Mariana Díaz Oliva	6	6
	(Germany) Martina Müller	3	4		2	(Argentina) Mariana Díaz Oliva	5	2
	(Canada) Maureen Drake	4	6	6		(Canada) Maureen Drake	7	6
19	(United States) Jennifer Hopkins	6	1	2

==== Third qualifier ====
First round					Qualifying competition
3	(Ukraine) Alona Bondarenko	4	6	6
	(United States) Bethanie Mattek	6	2	2	3	(Ukraine) Alona Bondarenko	6	3	1
WC	(United States) Brittany Blalock	3	0		15	(Belarus) Anastasiya Yakimova	0	6	6
15	(Belarus) Anastasiya Yakimova	6	6

==== Fourth qualifier ====
First round					Qualifying competition
26	(Russia) Galina Voskoboeva	4	7	6
	(Russia) Lioudmila Skavronskaia	6	5	1	26	(Russia) Galina Voskoboeva	6	6
	(Germany) Sandra Klösel	4	3		22	(Spain) Laura Pous Tió	0	4
22	(Spain) Laura Pous Tió	6	6

==== Fifth qualifier ====
First round					Qualifying competition
5	(France) Stéphanie Cohen-Aloro	6	4	3
	(Japan) Rika Fujiwara	2	6	6		(Japan) Rika Fujiwara	6	6
	(Argentina) Vanina García Sokol	6^{4}	2		18	(Hungary) Melinda Czink	3	2
18	(Hungary) Melinda Czink	7^{7}	6

==== Sixth qualifier ====
First round					Qualifying competition
6	(Italy) Antonella Serra Zanetti	3	6	6
	(Brazil) Maria Fernanda Alves	6	2	2	6	(Italy) Antonella Serra Zanetti	7	7
	(Ukraine) Yuliya Beygelzimer	5	6	6		(Ukraine) Yuliya Beygelzimer	5	5
17	(Canada) Marie-Ève Pelletier	7	1	4

==== Seventh qualifier ====
First round					Qualifying competition
7	(United States) Lilia Osterloh	6	4	4
	(Serbia and Montenegro) Jelena Dokic	3	6	6	(Serbia and Montenegro) Jelena Dokic	6^{2}	0
	(Argentina) María Emilia Salerni	6	6		(Argentina) María Emilia Salerni	7^{7}	6
14	(Colombia) Catalina Castaño	0	2

==== Eighth qualifier ====
First round					Qualifying competition
8	(Japan) Aiko Nakamura	6	4	5
	(Netherlands) Seda Noorlander	4	6	7		(Netherlands) Seda Noorlander	1	7	1
WC	(United States) Anne Yelsey	6^{3}	4		13	(Switzerland) Emmanuelle Gagliardi	6	5	6
13	(Switzerland) Emmanuelle Gagliardi	7^{7}	6

==== Ninth qualifier ====
First round				Qualifying competition
25	(India) Shikha Uberoi	6	6
	(Japan) Saori Obata	3	1	25	(India) Shikha Uberoi	6	3	6
WC	(United States) Anne Mall	5	1	24	(Russia) Ekaterina Bychkova	2	6	4
24	(Russia) Ekaterina Bychkova	7	6

==== Tenth qualifier ====
First round				Qualifying competition
10	(Croatia) Silvija Talaja	7	6
WC	(United States) Meilen Tu	5	4	10	(Croatia) Silvija Talaja	6	6
	(Zimbabwe) Cara Black	6	6		(Zimbabwe) Cara Black	2	3
21	(Czech Republic) Kateřina Böhmová	3	3

==== Eleventh qualifier ====
First round					Qualifying competition
11	(Germany) Julia Schruff	6	6
	(Austria) Sybille Bammer	3	3		11	(Germany) Julia Schruff	2	1
	(Romania) Delia Sescioreanu	4	7^{7}	2	20	(Czech Republic) Eva Birnerová	6	6
20	(Czech Republic) Eva Birnerová	6	6^{5}	6

==== Twelfth qualifier ====
First round				Qualifying competition
12	(France) Camille Pin	7^{7}	6
	(Czech Republic) Lenka Němečková	6^{1}	3	12	(France) Camille Pin	4	6	6
WC	(United States) Ashley Joelson	0	0	16	(Czech Republic) Sandra Kleinová	6	3	1
16	(Czech Republic) Sandra Kleinová	6	6
