= 2005 Gaz de France Stars – Singles =

Singles
- 2005 Gaz de France Stars

Final
- Champion: (Belgium) Kim Clijsters
- Runner-up: (Italy) Francesca Schiavone
- Score: 6–2, 6–3

Details
- Draw: 32
- Seeds: 8

Events
Singles	Doubles
← 2004 ·	Gaz de France Stars	· 2006 →

The singles event at the 2005 Gaz de France Stars took place in late October, 2005, on indoor hard courts in Hasselt, Belgium.

Kim Clijsters was the home crowd favourite; and emerged as the winner.

Elena Dementieva was the defending champion, but chose to compete in the 2005 Generali Ladies Linz instead.

== Seeds ==
1. (Belgium) Kim Clijsters (champion)
2. (France) Nathalie Dechy (quarterfinals)
3. (Italy) Francesca Schiavone (final)
4. (Russia) Dinara Safina (semifinals)
5. (Spain) Anabel Medina Garrigues (first round)
6. (Italy) Silvia Farina Elia (first round)
7. (Russia) Anna Chakvetadze (first round, retired due to a right wrist sprain)
8. (Slovenia) Katarina Srebotnik (quarterfinals)

== Draw ==
=== Key ===
- Q = Qualifier
- WC = Wild card
- LL = Lucky loser
- Alt = Alternate
- ITF = ITF entry
- PR = Protected ranking
- SR = Special ranking
- SE = Special exempt
- JE = Junior exempt
- JR = Junior Accelerator Programme entrant
- CO = College Accelerator Programme entrant
- NG = Next Gen Accelerator Program entrant
- w/o = Walkover
- r = Retired
- d = Defaulted

=== Finals ===
Semifinals
1	(Belgium) Kim Clijsters	6	6
4	(Russia) Dinara Safina	0	1
3	(Italy) Francesca Schiavone	4	6	7
(Netherlands) Michaëlla Krajicek	6	3	5

Final
1	(Belgium) Kim Clijsters	6	6
3	(Italy) Francesca Schiavone	2	3

=== Top half ===
First round
1	(Belgium) K Clijsters	6	6
(Russia) E Bychkova	1	3
(Croatia) K Šprem	6	6
Q	(Ukraine) O Savchuk	1	1
(Greece) E Daniilidou	6^{6}	4
WC	(Belgium) E Callens	7	6
(Germany) J Schruff	6	6
5	(Spain) A Medina Garrigues	2	1
4	(Russia) D Safina	6	6
(France) S Foretz	2	4
(Slovakia) M Suchá	6^{5}	1
(United States) J Craybas	7	6
(France) É Loit	3	7	1
Q	(United States) M Tu	6	6^{2}	6
(Italy) M Santangelo	3	0
8	(Slovenia) K Srebotnik	6	6

Second round
1	(Belgium) K Clijsters	6	6
(Croatia) K Šprem	2	0
WC	(Belgium) E Callens	3	1
(Germany) J Schruff	6	6
4	(Russia) D Safina	6	7
(United States) J Craybas	1	6^{3}
Q	(United States) M Tu	2	r
8	(Slovenia) K Srebotnik	2

Quarterfinals
1	(Belgium) K Clijsters	6	6
(Germany) J Schruff	2	3
4	(Russia) D Safina	4	6	7
8	(Slovenia) K Srebotnik	6	2	6^{9}

Semifinals
1	(Belgium) K Clijsters	6	6
4	(Russia) D Safina	0	1

=== Bottom half ===
First round
6	(Italy) S Farina Elia	3	2
WC	(Belgium) K Flipkens	6	6
(Australia) S Stosur	6	6
(Spain) N Llagostera Vives	4	0
(Russia) L Skavronskaia	1	3
(Italy) ME Camerin	6	6
Q	(Estonia) K Kanepi	3	4
3	(Italy) F Schiavone	6	6
7	(Russia) A Chakvetadze	1	1	r
(Netherlands) M Krajicek	6	3
(Czech Republic) L Šafářová	6	6
(Argentina) ME Salerni	2	1
Q	(Luxembourg) M Minella	4	2
(Italy) R Vinci	6	6
(Belarus) A Yakimova	3	1
2	(France) N Dechy	6	6

Second round
WC	(Belgium) K Flipkens	6^{7}	3
(Australia) S Stosur	7	6
(Italy) ME Camerin	5	1
3	(Italy) F Schiavone	7	6
(Netherlands) M Krajicek	6	3	6
(Czech Republic) L Šafářová	4	6	3
(Italy) R Vinci	0	2	r
2	(France) N Dechy	6	3

Quarterfinals
(Australia) S Stosur	3	2
3	(Italy) F Schiavone	6	6
(Netherlands) M Krajicek	6	6
2	(France) N Dechy	4	3

Semifinals
3	(Italy) F Schiavone	4	6	7
(Netherlands) M Krajicek	6	3	5
