= 2004 WTA Tour =

Women's tennis circuit

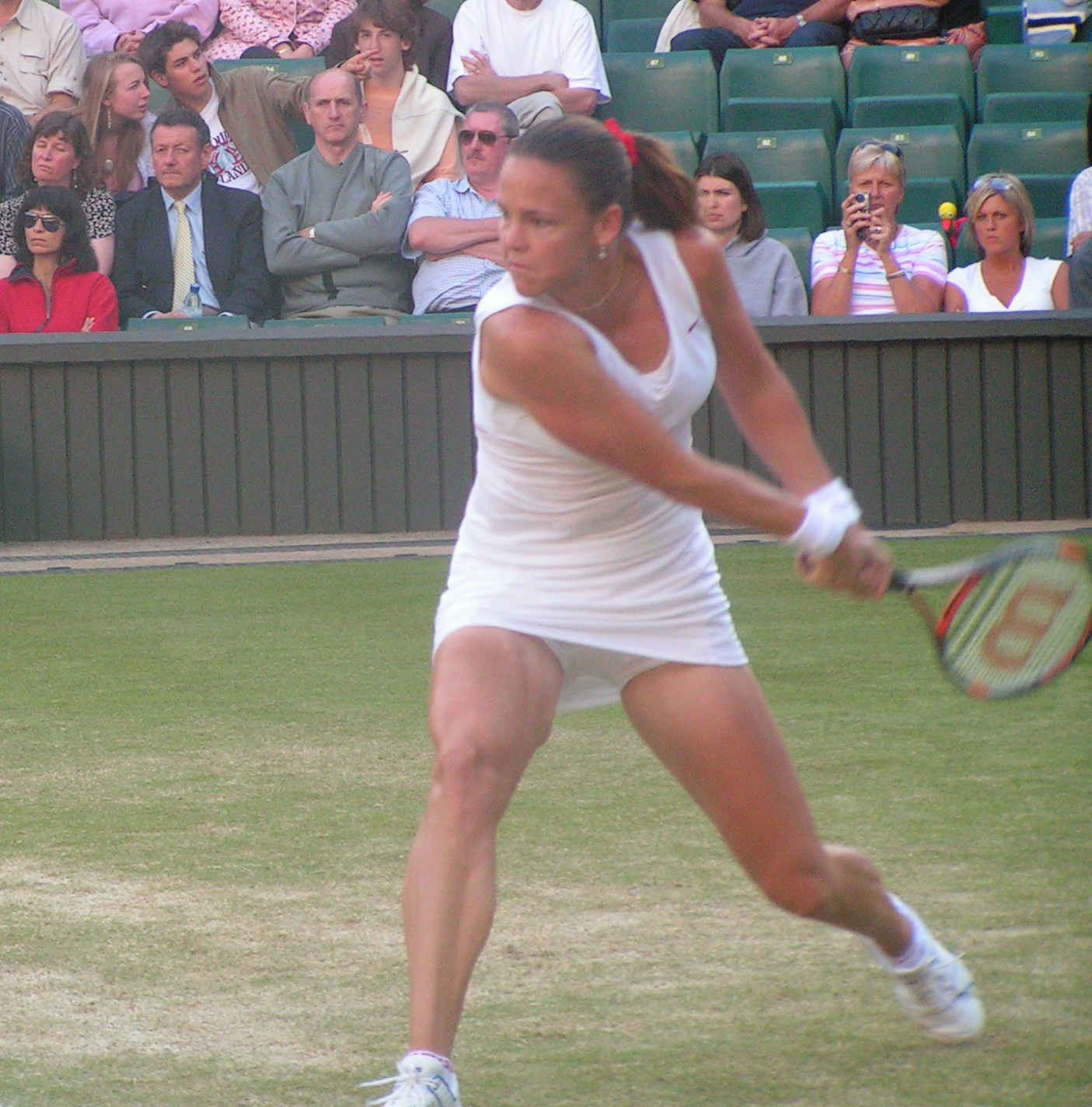
- Lindsay Davenport finished the year as WTA world No. 1 for the third time in her career, though Maria Sharapova was named the Player of the Year. Davenport won seven tournaments during the season, including two Tier I events. Sharapova won five tournaments during the season, including a major at the Wimbledon Championships, as well as the WTA Tour Championships.

Details
- Duration: January 3 – November 13, 2004
- Edition: 34th
- Tournaments: 60
- Categories: Grand Slam (4); WTA Championships; Summer Olympics; WTA Tier I (10); WTA Tier II (15); WTA Tier III (16); WTA Tier IV (5); WTA Tier V (8)

Achievements (singles)
- Most titles: (United States) Lindsay Davenport (7)
- Most finals: (United States) Lindsay Davenport (9) (France) Amélie Mauresmo (9)
- Prize money leader: (Russia) Maria Sharapova ($2,506,263)
- Points leader: (United States) Lindsay Davenport (4,760)

Awards
- Player of the year: (Russia) Maria Sharapova
- Doubles team of the year: (Spain) Virginia Ruano Pascual (Argentina) Paola Suárez
- Most improved player of the year: (Russia) Maria Sharapova
- Newcomer of the year: (France) Tatiana Golovin
- Comeback player of the year: (United States) Serena Williams

The 2004 WTA Tour was the elite professional tennis circuit organized by the Women's Tennis Association (WTA) for the 2004 season. The 2004 WTA Tour calendar comprised the Grand Slam tournaments (supervised by the International Tennis Federation (ITF)), the WTA Tier I-V Events, the Fed Cup (organized by the ITF), the Summer Olympic Games and the year-end championships.

In an open year, Lindsay Davenport finished the season at No. 1 for the third time after 1998 and 2001, despite not reaching a Grand Slam final. Amélie Mauresmo put together a consistent season, reaching No. 1 in September and finishing the year ranked No. 2. The Russian contingent enjoyed an impressive rise into the elite of women's tennis, with Anastasia Myskina, Maria Sharapova and Svetlana Kuznetsova all winning their first Grand Slam titles, and Elena Dementieva twice being a runner-up. The Belgian pair of Kim Clijsters and Justine Henin-Hardenne, who had risen to the top of women's tennis during 2003, both struggled with injuries throughout the season. Likewise, the dominance of the Williams sisters diminished, with both finishing the season outside the top 5.

== Season summary ==
=== Singles ===
World No. 1 Justine Henin-Hardenne started the season on a high note, taking the title in Sydney and then winning her third Grand Slam title at the Australian Open, defeating Kim Clijsters in the final. Fabiola Zuluaga and Patty Schnyder enjoyed runs to their first ever Grand Slam semifinals in singles. Schnyder took advantage of an open draw which saw Venus Williams dumped out in the third round by Lisa Raymond. Zuluaga advanced after Elena Dementieva and Nadia Petrova were early upset victims in her section of the draw, and then benefitted from a walkover from Amélie Mauresmo in the quarterfinals. Defending champion Serena Williams withdrew from the tournament due to her continuing recovery from knee surgery.

Henin-Hardenne won in Dubai amidst a 16-match win streak, which was snapped by Svetlana Kuznetsova in Doha. Kuznetsova lost to the defending champion Anastasia Myskina in the final. Elsewhere, Lindsay Davenport won her fourth title in Tokyo, tying Martina Hingis for the most wins at the event. Clijsters won the indoor tournaments in Paris and Antwerp, but struggled with injury for the rest of the season. Henin-Hardenne moved straight back to winning ways by taking the title in Indian Wells. Serena Williams would return in March, winning her first tournament back in Miami.

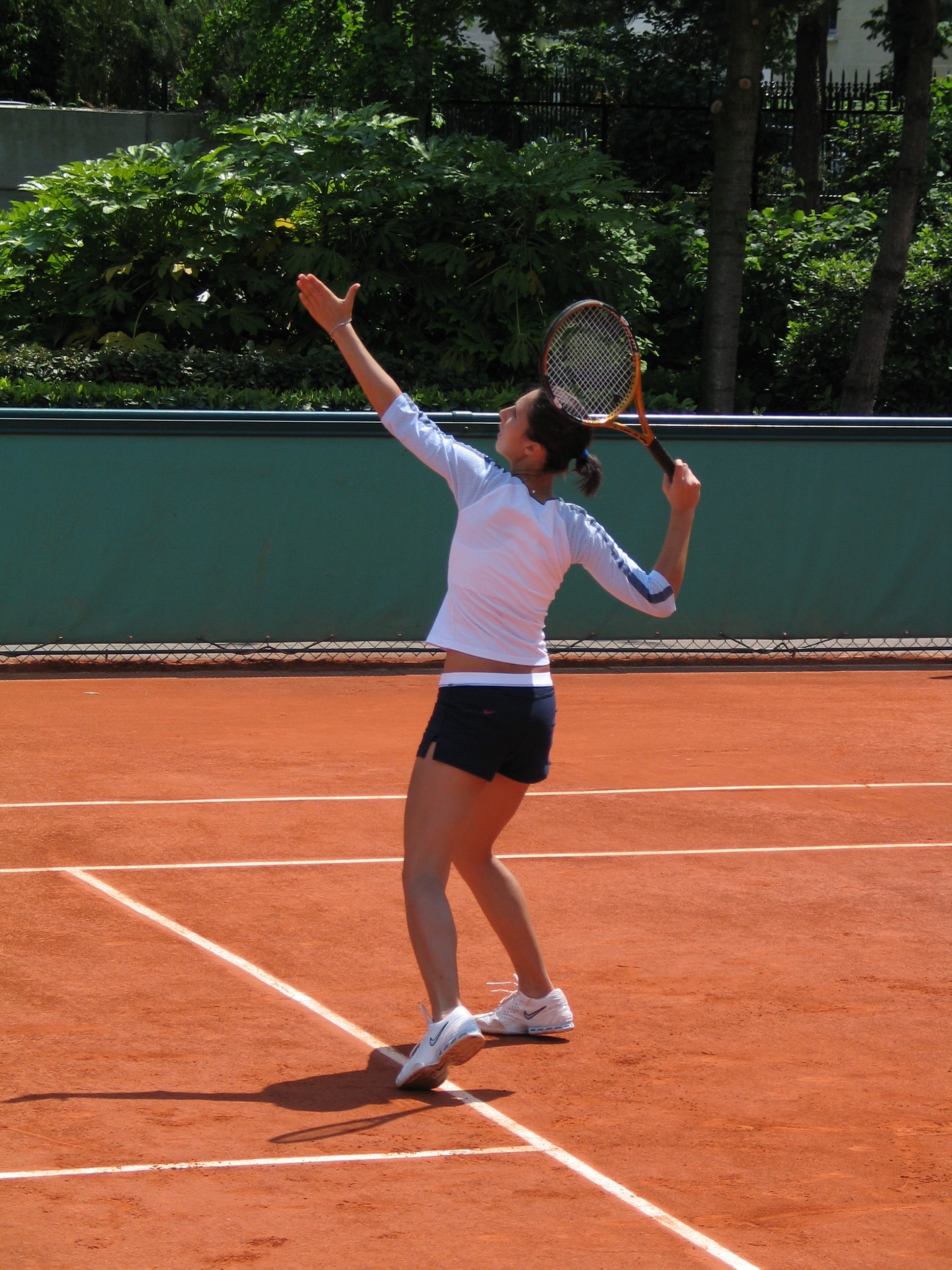
Anastasia Myskina won her first and only Grand Slam title at the French Open.

The clay court season began with Davenport claiming the title in Amelia Island. Venus Williams then won both Charleston and Warsaw in succession. Amélie Mauresmo won the two biggest warm-up tournaments on red clay at Berlin and Rome, with Williams also reaching the final in Germany. Mauresmo's feat of winning both events was previously matched by Steffi Graf and Monica Seles, both of whom also lifted the French Open that same year.

However, it proved not to be a good omen for Mauresmo as she lost to Elena Dementieva in the quarterfinals. Clijsters withdrew from the tournament with a wrist injury, whilst her compatriot and defending champion Henin-Hardenne bowed out in the second round with injury against Tathiana Garbin. It was the earliest loss for the No. 1 seed there since 1925. That upset allowed Paola Suárez to reach her first Grand Slam semifinal in singles, where she lost to Dementieva. In the bottom half of the draw, Anastasia Myskina came through after wins over Venus Williams and Jennifer Capriati. The first all-Russian Grand Slam final ended quickly, with Myskina routing a nervous Dementieva to become the first Grand Slam singles champion from Russia.

Russian dominance continued in the grass court warmups, with Maria Sharapova winning in Birmingham and Svetlana Kuznetsova prevailing in Eastbourne. Mary Pierce also claimed her first tour title since the French Open four years previously, winning in 's-Hertogenbosch. Clijsters and Henin-Hardenne sat out the year's third Grand Slam with the same injuries that put them out of the French Open. The first week of Wimbledon saw Venus Williams sent home in the second round by Karolina Šprem, whilst the two French Open finalists failed to make the successful transition between clay and grass: Dementieva lost to Sandra Kleinová, and Myskina to Amy Frazier. The final was to be contested between Serena Williams and Maria Sharapova, who both made impressive comebacks in their semifinals from a set and a break down. In the final, Sharapova upset the two-time defending champion to win her first Grand Slam title, the third youngest winner ever at Wimbledon.

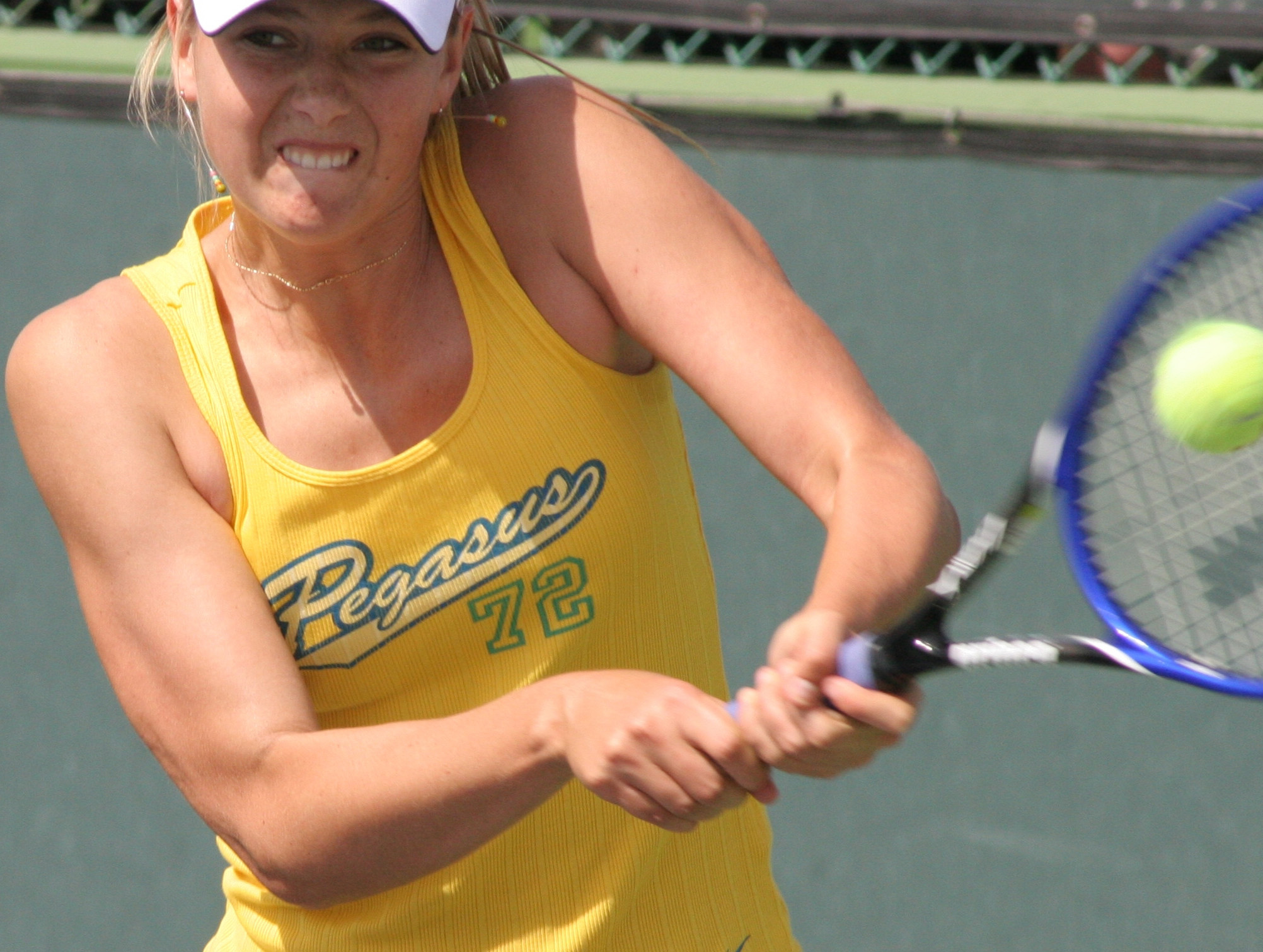
Maria Sharapova won Wimbledon and the year-end championships, plus three other titles throughout the season.

Davenport started the summer hardcourt season on a hot streak, winning events in Stanford, Los Angeles, San Diego and Cincinnati to build an impressive winning run going into the year's final Grand Slam. Nicole Vaidišová became one of the youngest tour titlists in history by winning a smaller event in Vancouver. Mauresmo won the Tier I event in Toronto, beating Elena Likhovtseva in the final. Henin-Hardenne returned from her illness to play the Athens Olympics, where she won the gold medal match over Mauresmo. In the bronze medal match, Alicia Molik beat Myskina.

Davenport was the favourite to take her second U.S. Open title, but she was stopped in the semifinals by Svetlana Kuznetsova. It was a half of upsets with Henin-Hardenne falling to Nadia Petrova, and Myskina and Sharapova also departing early. Henin-Hardenne's loss meant that Mauresmo would reach the No. 1 ranking position for the first time. In the bottom half of the draw, Elena Dementieva beat Mauresmo and Capriati—who was coming off a controversial win against Serena Williams in the quarterfinals with several contentious line calls going against Williams—to reach her second Grand Slam final. In another all-Russian final, Kuznetsova became the third player from the country to win her maiden Grand Slam in succession.

Mauresmo's reign at No. 1 turned out to be short-lived, with Davenport, who won the title in Stuttgart during the fall season, displacing her one-month later. Nevertheless, it turned out to be a successful stretch for Mauresmo, who claimed titles in Linz and Philadelphia. Alicia Molik won her biggest career title in Zurich and a smaller event in Luxembourg, while Myskina defended her title in Moscow. Svetlana Kuznetsova won the title in Bali and reached the final in Beijing, losing to Serena Williams. It was Sharapova who ended up winning the season-ending WTA Tour Championships, beating Williams in the final, after picking up smaller titles in Seoul and Tokyo, and reaching the final in Zurich. Nadia Petrova and Meghann Shaughnessy won the doubles event.

== Schedule ==
The table below shows the 2004 WTA Tour schedule.

=== Key ===
Grand Slam events
Summer Olympic Games
Year-end championships
Tier I events
Tier II events
Tier III events
Tier IV and V events
Team events

=== January ===
Week	Tournament	Champions	Runners-up	Semifinalists	Quarterfinalists
5 Jan	Hopman Cup; Perth, Australia; Hopman Cup; Hard (i) – 8 teams (RR)	United States; 2–1	Slovakia	Round robin losers (Group A) France; Russia; Czech Republic	Round robin losers (Group B) Australia; Belgium; Hungary
5 Jan	Uncle Tobys Hardcourts; Gold Coast, Australia; Tier III event Hard – $170,000 – 30S/16D; Singles – Doubles	(Japan) Ai Sugiyama; 1–6, 6–1, 6–4	(Russia) Nadia Petrova	(Australia) Samantha Stosur (France) Nathalie Dechy	(Bulgaria) Magdalena Maleeva (Spain) Magüi Serna (Russia) Svetlana Kuznetsova (Russia) Dinara Safina
5 Jan	Uncle Tobys Hardcourts; Gold Coast, Australia; Tier III event Hard – $170,000 – 30S/16D; Singles – Doubles	(Russia) Svetlana Kuznetsova (Russia) Elena Likhovtseva; 6–3, 6–4	(South Africa) Liezel Huber (Bulgaria) Magdalena Maleeva	(Australia) Samantha Stosur (France) Nathalie Dechy	(Bulgaria) Magdalena Maleeva (Spain) Magüi Serna (Russia) Svetlana Kuznetsova (Russia) Dinara Safina
5 Jan	ASB Classic; Auckland, New Zealand; Tier IV event Hard – $140,000 – 32S/16D; Singles – Doubles	(Greece) Eleni Daniilidou; 6–3, 6–2	(United States) Ashley Harkleroad	(Argentina) Paola Suárez (France) Marion Bartoli	(Puerto Rico) Kristina Brandi (United States) Meilen Tu (United States) Shenay Perry (Germany) Anca Barna
5 Jan	ASB Classic; Auckland, New Zealand; Tier IV event Hard – $140,000 – 32S/16D; Singles – Doubles	(Bosnia and Herzegovina) Mervana Jugić-Salkić (Croatia) Jelena Kostanić; 7–6^{(8–6)}, 3–6, 6–1	(Spain) Virginia Ruano Pascual (Argentina) Paola Suárez	(Argentina) Paola Suárez (France) Marion Bartoli	(Puerto Rico) Kristina Brandi (United States) Meilen Tu (United States) Shenay Perry (Germany) Anca Barna
12 Jan	Medibank International; Sydney, Australia; Tier II event Hard – $585,000 – 28S/16D; Singles – Doubles	(Belgium) Justine Henin-Hardenne; 6–4, 6–4	(France) Amélie Mauresmo	(United States) Lindsay Davenport (Italy) Francesca Schiavone	(United States) Chanda Rubin (Russia) Elena Dementieva (Russia) Anastasia Myskina (Israel) Anna Smashnova-Pistolesi
12 Jan	Medibank International; Sydney, Australia; Tier II event Hard – $585,000 – 28S/16D; Singles – Doubles	(Zimbabwe) Cara Black (Australia) Rennae Stubbs; 7–5, 3–6, 6–4	(Russia) Dinara Safina (United States) Meghann Shaughnessy	(United States) Lindsay Davenport (Italy) Francesca Schiavone	(United States) Chanda Rubin (Russia) Elena Dementieva (Russia) Anastasia Myskina (Israel) Anna Smashnova-Pistolesi
12 Jan	Moorilla Hobart International; Hobart, Australia; Tier V event Hard – $110,000 – 32S/14D; Singles – Doubles	(United States) Amy Frazier; 6–3, 6–3	(Japan) Shinobu Asagoe	(Puerto Rico) Kristina Brandi (Argentina) María Emilia Salerni	(Japan) Akiko Morigami (Colombia) Fabiola Zuluaga (Italy) Maria Elena Camerin (Germany) Anca Barna
12 Jan	Moorilla Hobart International; Hobart, Australia; Tier V event Hard – $110,000 – 32S/14D; Singles – Doubles	(Japan) Shinobu Asagoe (Japan) Seiko Okamoto; 2–6, 6–4, 6–3	(Belgium) Els Callens (Austria) Barbara Schett	(Puerto Rico) Kristina Brandi (Argentina) María Emilia Salerni	(Japan) Akiko Morigami (Colombia) Fabiola Zuluaga (Italy) Maria Elena Camerin (Germany) Anca Barna
12 Jan	Canberra Women's Classic; Canberra, Australia; Tier V event Hard – $110,000 – 32S/16D; Singles – Doubles	(Argentina) Paola Suárez; 3–6, 6–4, 7–6^{(7–5)}	(Italy) Silvia Farina Elia	(Ukraine) Julia Vakulenko (Croatia) Karolina Šprem	(Spain) María Sánchez Lorenzo (Italy) Flavia Pennetta (France) Émilie Loit (Spain) Arantxa Parra Santonja
12 Jan	Canberra Women's Classic; Canberra, Australia; Tier V event Hard – $110,000 – 32S/16D; Singles – Doubles	(Croatia) Jelena Kostanić (Luxembourg) Claudine Schaul; 6–4, 7–6^{(7–3)}	(France) Caroline Dhenin (Australia) Lisa McShea	(Ukraine) Julia Vakulenko (Croatia) Karolina Šprem	(Spain) María Sánchez Lorenzo (Italy) Flavia Pennetta (France) Émilie Loit (Spain) Arantxa Parra Santonja
19 Jan; 26 Jan	Australian Open; Melbourne, Australia; Grand Slam; Hard – $5,590,310 – 128S/96Q/64D/32X; Singles – Doubles – Mixed doubles	(Belgium) Justine Henin-Hardenne; 6–3, 4–6, 6–3	(Belgium) Kim Clijsters	(Colombia) Fabiola Zuluaga (Switzerland) Patty Schnyder	(United States) Lindsay Davenport (France) Amélie Mauresmo (United States) Lisa Raymond (Russia) Anastasia Myskina
19 Jan; 26 Jan	Australian Open; Melbourne, Australia; Grand Slam; Hard – $5,590,310 – 128S/96Q/64D/32X; Singles – Doubles – Mixed doubles	(Spain) Virginia Ruano Pascual (Argentina) Paola Suárez; 6–4, 6–3	(Russia) Svetlana Kuznetsova (Russia) Elena Likhovtseva	(Colombia) Fabiola Zuluaga (Switzerland) Patty Schnyder	(United States) Lindsay Davenport (France) Amélie Mauresmo (United States) Lisa Raymond (Russia) Anastasia Myskina
19 Jan; 26 Jan	Australian Open; Melbourne, Australia; Grand Slam; Hard – $5,590,310 – 128S/96Q/64D/32X; Singles – Doubles – Mixed doubles	(Federal Republic of Yugoslavia) Nenad Zimonjić (Russia) Elena Bovina; 6–1, 7–6^{(7–3)}	(India) Leander Paes (United States) Martina Navratilova	(Colombia) Fabiola Zuluaga (Switzerland) Patty Schnyder	(United States) Lindsay Davenport (France) Amélie Mauresmo (United States) Lisa Raymond (Russia) Anastasia Myskina

=== February ===
Week	Tournament	Champions	Runners-up	Semifinalists	Quarterfinalists
2 Feb	Toray Pan Pacific Open; Tokyo, Japan; Tier I event Carpet (i) – $1,300,000 – 28S/16D; Singles – Doubles	(United States) Lindsay Davenport; 6–4, 6–1	(Bulgaria) Magdalena Maleeva	(United States) Chanda Rubin (Federal Republic of Yugoslavia) Jelena Dokić	(United States) Venus Williams (Japan) Ai Sugiyama (Russia) Tatiana Panova (Slovakia) Daniela Hantuchová
2 Feb	Toray Pan Pacific Open; Tokyo, Japan; Tier I event Carpet (i) – $1,300,000 – 28S/16D; Singles – Doubles	(Zimbabwe) Cara Black (Australia) Rennae Stubbs; 6–0, 6–1	(Russia) Elena Likhovtseva (Bulgaria) Magdalena Maleeva	(United States) Chanda Rubin (Federal Republic of Yugoslavia) Jelena Dokić	(United States) Venus Williams (Japan) Ai Sugiyama (Russia) Tatiana Panova (Slovakia) Daniela Hantuchová
9 Feb	Open Gaz de France; Paris, France; Tier II event Hard (i) – $585,000 – 28S/16D; Singles – Doubles	(Belgium) Kim Clijsters; 6–2, 6–1	(France) Mary Pierce	(Russia) Dinara Safina (France) Tatiana Golovin	(Italy) Silvia Farina Elia (Italy) Francesca Schiavone (Russia) Elena Bovina (Russia) Elena Dementieva
9 Feb	Open Gaz de France; Paris, France; Tier II event Hard (i) – $585,000 – 28S/16D; Singles – Doubles	(Austria) Barbara Schett (Switzerland) Patty Schnyder; 6–3, 6–2	(Italy) Silvia Farina Elia (Italy) Francesca Schiavone	(Russia) Dinara Safina (France) Tatiana Golovin	(Italy) Silvia Farina Elia (Italy) Francesca Schiavone (Russia) Elena Bovina (Russia) Elena Dementieva
16 Feb	Proximus Diamond Games; Antwerp, Belgium; Tier II event Hard (i) – $585,000 – 28S/16D; Singles – Doubles	(Belgium) Kim Clijsters; 6–3, 6–0	(Italy) Silvia Farina Elia	(Croatia) Karolina Šprem (Switzerland) Myriam Casanova	(Czech Republic) Denisa Chládková (Switzerland) Patty Schnyder (Czech Republic) Klára Koukalová (Bulgaria) Magdalena Maleeva
16 Feb	Proximus Diamond Games; Antwerp, Belgium; Tier II event Hard (i) – $585,000 – 28S/16D; Singles – Doubles	(Zimbabwe) Cara Black (Belgium) Els Callens; 6–2, 6–1	(Switzerland) Myriam Casanova (Greece) Eleni Daniilidou	(Croatia) Karolina Šprem (Switzerland) Myriam Casanova	(Czech Republic) Denisa Chládková (Switzerland) Patty Schnyder (Czech Republic) Klára Koukalová (Bulgaria) Magdalena Maleeva
16 Feb	Cellular South Cup; Memphis, United States; Tier III event Hard (i) – $190,000 – 30S/16D; Singles – Doubles	(Russia) Vera Zvonareva; 4–6, 6–4, 7–5	(United States) Lisa Raymond	(Russia) Maria Sharapova (United States) Laura Granville	(Argentina) Gisela Dulko (United States) Amy Frazier (Puerto Rico) Kristina Brandi (United States) Lindsay Lee-Waters
16 Feb	Cellular South Cup; Memphis, United States; Tier III event Hard (i) – $190,000 – 30S/16D; Singles – Doubles	(Sweden) Åsa Svensson (United States) Meilen Tu; 6–4, 7–6(0)	(Russia) Maria Sharapova (Russia) Vera Zvonareva	(Russia) Maria Sharapova (United States) Laura Granville	(Argentina) Gisela Dulko (United States) Amy Frazier (Puerto Rico) Kristina Brandi (United States) Lindsay Lee-Waters
16 Feb	AP Tourism Hyderabad Open; Hyderabad, India; Tier IV event Hard – $140,000 – 32S/16D; Singles – Doubles	(Australia) Nicole Pratt; 7–6^{(7–3)}, 6–1	(Russia) Maria Kirilenko	(Thailand) Tamarine Tanasugarn (France) Marion Bartoli	(Indonesia) Angelique Widjaja (China) Zheng Jie (Croatia) Jelena Kostanić (Bosnia and Herzegovina) Mervana Jugić-Salkić
16 Feb	AP Tourism Hyderabad Open; Hyderabad, India; Tier IV event Hard – $140,000 – 32S/16D; Singles – Doubles	(South Africa) Liezel Huber (India) Sania Mirza; 7–6^{(7–1)}, 6–4	(China) Li Ting (China) Sun Tiantian	(Thailand) Tamarine Tanasugarn (France) Marion Bartoli	(Indonesia) Angelique Widjaja (China) Zheng Jie (Croatia) Jelena Kostanić (Bosnia and Herzegovina) Mervana Jugić-Salkić
23 Feb	Dubai Tennis Championships; Dubai, United Arab Emirates; Tier II event Hard – $585,000 – 28S/16D; Singles – Doubles	(Belgium) Justine Henin-Hardenne; 7–6^{(7–3)}, 6–3	(Russia) Svetlana Kuznetsova	(United States) Meghann Shaughnessy (Japan) Ai Sugiyama	(Spain) Conchita Martínez (Russia) Anastasia Myskina (Greece) Eleni Daniilidou (United States) Venus Williams
23 Feb	Dubai Tennis Championships; Dubai, United Arab Emirates; Tier II event Hard – $585,000 – 28S/16D; Singles – Doubles	(Slovakia) Janette Husárová (Spain) Conchita Martínez; 6–0, 1–6, 6–3	(Russia) Svetlana Kuznetsova (Russia) Elena Likhovtseva	(United States) Meghann Shaughnessy (Japan) Ai Sugiyama	(Spain) Conchita Martínez (Russia) Anastasia Myskina (Greece) Eleni Daniilidou (United States) Venus Williams
23 Feb	Copa Colsanitas Seguros Bolívar; Bogotá, Colombia; Tier III event Clay – $170,000 – 30S/16D; Singles – Doubles	(Colombia) Fabiola Zuluaga; 3–6, 6–4, 6–2	(Spain) María Sánchez Lorenzo	(Slovakia) Ľubomíra Kurhajcová (France) Émilie Loit	(Colombia) Catalina Castaño (Slovakia) Ľudmila Cervanová (Croatia) Lana Popadić (Spain) Conchita Martínez Granados
23 Feb	Copa Colsanitas Seguros Bolívar; Bogotá, Colombia; Tier III event Clay – $170,000 – 30S/16D; Singles – Doubles	(Austria) Barbara Schwartz (Germany) Jasmin Wöhr; 6–1, 6–3	(Spain) Anabel Medina Garrigues (Spain) Arantxa Parra Santonja	(Slovakia) Ľubomíra Kurhajcová (France) Émilie Loit	(Colombia) Catalina Castaño (Slovakia) Ľudmila Cervanová (Croatia) Lana Popadić (Spain) Conchita Martínez Granados

=== March ===
Week	Tournament	Champions	Runners-up	Semifinalists	Quarterfinalists
1 Mar	Qatar Total Open; Doha, Qatar; Tier II event Hard – $600,000 – 28S/16D; Singles – Doubles	(Russia) Anastasia Myskina; 4–6, 6–4, 6–4	(Russia) Svetlana Kuznetsova	(Belgium) Justine Henin-Hardenne (United States) Jennifer Capriati	(France) Nathalie Dechy (United States) Meghann Shaughnessy (China) Zheng Jie (Italy) Silvia Farina Elia
1 Mar	Qatar Total Open; Doha, Qatar; Tier II event Hard – $600,000 – 28S/16D; Singles – Doubles	(Russia) Svetlana Kuznetsova (Russia) Elena Likhovtseva; 7–6^{(7–4)}, 6–2	(Slovakia) Janette Husárová (Spain) Conchita Martínez	(Belgium) Justine Henin-Hardenne (United States) Jennifer Capriati	(France) Nathalie Dechy (United States) Meghann Shaughnessy (China) Zheng Jie (Italy) Silvia Farina Elia
1 Mar	Abierto Mexicano Telcel; Acapulco, Mexico; Tier III event Clay – $170,000 – 30S/16D; Singles – Doubles	(Czech Republic) Iveta Benešová; 7–6^{(7–5)}, 6–4	(Italy) Flavia Pennetta	(Spain) Marta Marrero (Spain) María Sánchez Lorenzo	(Australia) Samantha Stosur (France) Émilie Loit (Ukraine) Julia Vakulenko (Czech Republic) Nicole Vaidišová
1 Mar	Abierto Mexicano Telcel; Acapulco, Mexico; Tier III event Clay – $170,000 – 30S/16D; Singles – Doubles	(Australia) Lisa McShea (Venezuela) Milagros Sequera; 2–6, 7–6^{(7–5)}, 6–4	(Czech Republic) Olga Blahotová (Czech Republic) Gabriela Navrátilová	(Spain) Marta Marrero (Spain) María Sánchez Lorenzo	(Australia) Samantha Stosur (France) Émilie Loit (Ukraine) Julia Vakulenko (Czech Republic) Nicole Vaidišová
8 Mar; 15 Mar	Pacific Life Open; Indian Wells, United States; Tier I event Hard – $2,100,000 – 96S/32D; Singles – Doubles	(Belgium) Justine Henin-Hardenne; 6–1, 6–4	(United States) Lindsay Davenport	(Russia) Anastasia Myskina (France) Nathalie Dechy	(Russia) Svetlana Kuznetsova (Spain) Conchita Martínez (Argentina) Gisela Dulko (Colombia) Fabiola Zuluaga
8 Mar; 15 Mar	Pacific Life Open; Indian Wells, United States; Tier I event Hard – $2,100,000 – 96S/32D; Singles – Doubles	(Spain) Virginia Ruano Pascual (Argentina) Paola Suárez; 6–1, 6–2	(Russia) Svetlana Kuznetsova (Russia) Elena Likhovtseva	(Russia) Anastasia Myskina (France) Nathalie Dechy	(Russia) Svetlana Kuznetsova (Spain) Conchita Martínez (Argentina) Gisela Dulko (Colombia) Fabiola Zuluaga
22 Mar; 29 Mar	NASDAQ-100 Open; Key Biscayne, United States; Tier I event Hard – $3,060,000 – 96S/32D; Singles – Doubles	(United States) Serena Williams; 6–1, 6–1	(Russia) Elena Dementieva	(Greece) Eleni Daniilidou (Russia) Nadia Petrova	(United States) Jill Craybas (Croatia) Karolina Šprem (France) Nathalie Dechy (United States) Venus Williams
22 Mar; 29 Mar	NASDAQ-100 Open; Key Biscayne, United States; Tier I event Hard – $3,060,000 – 96S/32D; Singles – Doubles	(Russia) Nadia Petrova (United States) Meghann Shaughnessy; 6–2, 6–3	(Russia) Svetlana Kuznetsova (Russia) Elena Likhovtseva	(Greece) Eleni Daniilidou (Russia) Nadia Petrova	(United States) Jill Craybas (Croatia) Karolina Šprem (France) Nathalie Dechy (United States) Venus Williams

=== April ===
Week	Tournament	Champions	Runners-up	Semifinalists	Quarterfinalists
5 Apr	Bausch & Lomb Championships; Amelia Island, United States; Tier II event Clay (green) – $585,000 – 56S/16D; Singles – Doubles	(United States) Lindsay Davenport; 6–4, 6–4	(France) Amélie Mauresmo	(Belgium) Justine Henin-Hardenne (Russia) Nadia Petrova	(Russia) Vera Zvonareva (Italy) Silvia Farina Elia (Argentina) Paola Suárez (United States) Serena Williams
5 Apr	Bausch & Lomb Championships; Amelia Island, United States; Tier II event Clay (green) – $585,000 – 56S/16D; Singles – Doubles	(Russia) Nadia Petrova (United States) Meghann Shaughnessy; 3–6, 6–2, 7–5	(Switzerland) Myriam Casanova (Australia) Alicia Molik	(Belgium) Justine Henin-Hardenne (Russia) Nadia Petrova	(Russia) Vera Zvonareva (Italy) Silvia Farina Elia (Argentina) Paola Suárez (United States) Serena Williams
5 Apr	GP SAR La Princesse Lalla Meryem; Casablanca, Morocco; Tier V event Clay – $110,000 – 32S/16D; Singles – Doubles	(France) Émilie Loit; 6–2, 6–2	(Slovakia) Ľudmila Cervanová	(Italy) Rita Grande (Czech Republic) Klára Koukalová	(Spain) Marta Marrero (Slovakia) Ľubomíra Kurhajcová (Poland) Marta Domachowska (Italy) Maria Elena Camerin
5 Apr	GP SAR La Princesse Lalla Meryem; Casablanca, Morocco; Tier V event Clay – $110,000 – 32S/16D; Singles – Doubles	(France) Marion Bartoli (France) Émilie Loit; 6–4, 6–2	(Belgium) Els Callens (Slovenia) Katarina Srebotnik	(Italy) Rita Grande (Czech Republic) Klára Koukalová	(Spain) Marta Marrero (Slovakia) Ľubomíra Kurhajcová (Poland) Marta Domachowska (Italy) Maria Elena Camerin
12 Apr	Family Circle Cup; Charleston, United States; Tier I event Clay (green) – $1,300,000 – 56S/28D; Singles – Doubles	(United States) Venus Williams; 2–6, 6–2, 6–1	(Spain) Conchita Martínez	(Croatia) Jelena Kostanić (Switzerland) Patty Schnyder	(Hungary) Petra Mandula (Russia) Vera Zvonareva (United States) Lindsay Davenport (Russia) Nadia Petrova
12 Apr	Family Circle Cup; Charleston, United States; Tier I event Clay (green) – $1,300,000 – 56S/28D; Singles – Doubles	(Spain) Virginia Ruano Pascual (Argentina) Paola Suárez; 6–4, 6–1	(United States) Martina Navratilova (United States) Lisa Raymond	(Croatia) Jelena Kostanić (Switzerland) Patty Schnyder	(Hungary) Petra Mandula (Russia) Vera Zvonareva (United States) Lindsay Davenport (Russia) Nadia Petrova
12 Apr	Estoril Open; Oeiras, Portugal; Tier V event Clay – $110,000 – 32S/16D; Singles – Doubles	(France) Émilie Loit; 7–5, 7–6^{(7–1)}	(Czech Republic) Iveta Benešová	(Spain) Marta Marrero (France) Stéphanie Cohen-Aloro	(Austria) Barbara Schett (Czech Republic) Klára Koukalová (Czech Republic) Denisa Chládková (Slovakia) Martina Suchá
12 Apr	Estoril Open; Oeiras, Portugal; Tier V event Clay – $110,000 – 32S/16D; Singles – Doubles	(Switzerland) Emmanuelle Gagliardi (Slovakia) Janette Husárová; 6–3, 6–2	(Czech Republic) Olga Blahotová (Czech Republic) Gabriela Navrátilová	(Spain) Marta Marrero (France) Stéphanie Cohen-Aloro	(Austria) Barbara Schett (Czech Republic) Klára Koukalová (Czech Republic) Denisa Chládková (Slovakia) Martina Suchá
19 April	Fed Cup: First Round; Amiens, France, clay (red) (i); Lecce, Italy, clay (red); Cartagena, Spain, clay (red); Bree, Belgium, clay (red); Moscow, Russia, carpet (i); Buenos Aires, Argentina, clay (red); Sankt Pölten, Austria, clay (red); Portorož, Slovenia, clay (red)	First round winners France 5–0; Italy 3–1; Spain 3–2; Belgium 3–2; Russia 4–1; Argentina 4–1; Austria 3–2; United States 4–1	First round losers Germany; Czech Republic; Switzerland; Croatia; Australia; Japan; Slovakia; Slovenia		
26 Apr	J&S Cup; Warsaw, Poland; Tier II event Clay – $585,000 – 28S/16D; Singles – Doubles	(United States) Venus Williams; 6–1, 6–4	(Russia) Svetlana Kuznetsova	(Italy) Francesca Schiavone (Russia) Vera Zvonareva	(France) Amélie Mauresmo (Italy) Silvia Farina Elia (Israel) Anna Smashnova-Pistolesi (Bulgaria) Magdalena Maleeva
26 Apr	J&S Cup; Warsaw, Poland; Tier II event Clay – $585,000 – 28S/16D; Singles – Doubles	(Italy) Silvia Farina Elia (Italy) Francesca Schiavone; 3–6, 6–2, 6–1	(Argentina) Gisela Dulko (Argentina) Patricia Tarabini	(Italy) Francesca Schiavone (Russia) Vera Zvonareva	(France) Amélie Mauresmo (Italy) Silvia Farina Elia (Israel) Anna Smashnova-Pistolesi (Bulgaria) Magdalena Maleeva
26 Apr	Tippmix Budapest Grand Prix; Budapest, Hungary; Tier V event Clay – $110,000 – 32S/23Q/14D; Singles – Doubles	(Federal Republic of Yugoslavia) Jelena Janković; 7–6^{(7–4)}, 6–3	(Slovakia) Martina Suchá	(Italy) Flavia Pennetta (Czech Republic) Iveta Benešová	(Croatia) Sanda Mamić (Slovakia) Ľudmila Cervanová (Hungary) Anikó Kapros (Hungary) Petra Mandula
26 Apr	Tippmix Budapest Grand Prix; Budapest, Hungary; Tier V event Clay – $110,000 – 32S/23Q/14D; Singles – Doubles	(Hungary) Petra Mandula (Austria) Barbara Schett; 6–3, 6–2	(Hungary) Virág Németh (Hungary) Ágnes Szávay	(Italy) Flavia Pennetta (Czech Republic) Iveta Benešová	(Croatia) Sanda Mamić (Slovakia) Ľudmila Cervanová (Hungary) Anikó Kapros (Hungary) Petra Mandula

=== May ===
Week	Tournament	Champions	Runners-up	Semifinalists	Quarterfinalists
3 May	Qatar Total German Open; Berlin, Germany; Tier I event Clay – $1,300,000 – 56S/28D; Singles – Doubles	(France) Amélie Mauresmo; Walkover	(United States) Venus Williams	(Croatia) Karolina Šprem (United States) Jennifer Capriati	(Colombia) Fabiola Zuluaga (Argentina) Paola Suárez (Russia) Svetlana Kuznetsova (Russia) Anastasia Myskina
3 May	Qatar Total German Open; Berlin, Germany; Tier I event Clay – $1,300,000 – 56S/28D; Singles – Doubles	(Russia) Nadia Petrova (United States) Meghann Shaughnessy; 6–2, 2–6, 6–1	(Slovakia) Janette Husárová (Spain) Conchita Martínez	(Croatia) Karolina Šprem (United States) Jennifer Capriati	(Colombia) Fabiola Zuluaga (Argentina) Paola Suárez (Russia) Svetlana Kuznetsova (Russia) Anastasia Myskina
10 May	Internazionali BNL d'Italia; Rome, Italy; Tier I event Clay – $1,300,000 – 56S/28D; Singles – Doubles	(France) Amélie Mauresmo; 3–6, 6–3, 7–6^{(8–6)}	(United States) Jennifer Capriati	(United States) Serena Williams (Russia) Vera Zvonareva	(Russia) Svetlana Kuznetsova (Israel) Anna Smashnova-Pistolesi (Italy) Francesca Schiavone (Italy) Silvia Farina Elia
10 May	Internazionali BNL d'Italia; Rome, Italy; Tier I event Clay – $1,300,000 – 56S/28D; Singles – Doubles	(Russia) Nadia Petrova (United States) Meghann Shaughnessy; 2–6, 6–3, 6–3	(Spain) Virginia Ruano Pascual (Argentina) Paola Suárez	(United States) Serena Williams (Russia) Vera Zvonareva	(Russia) Svetlana Kuznetsova (Israel) Anna Smashnova-Pistolesi (Italy) Francesca Schiavone (Italy) Silvia Farina Elia
17 May	Internationaux de Strasbourg; Strasbourg, France; Tier III event Clay – $170,000 – 30S/16D; Singles – Doubles	(Luxembourg) Claudine Schaul; 2–6, 6–0, 6–3	(United States) Lindsay Davenport	(Italy) Silvia Farina Elia (France) Émilie Loit	(Slovenia) Katarina Srebotnik (Venezuela) Milagros Sequera (Czech Republic) Barbora Strýcová (Japan) Ai Sugiyama
17 May	Internationaux de Strasbourg; Strasbourg, France; Tier III event Clay – $170,000 – 30S/16D; Singles – Doubles	(Australia) Lisa McShea (Venezuela) Milagros Sequera; 6–4, 6–1	(Slovenia) Tina Križan (Slovenia) Katarina Srebotnik	(Italy) Silvia Farina Elia (France) Émilie Loit	(Slovenia) Katarina Srebotnik (Venezuela) Milagros Sequera (Czech Republic) Barbora Strýcová (Japan) Ai Sugiyama
17 May	Wien Energie Grand Prix; Vienna, Austria; Tier III event Clay – $170,000 – 30S/16D; Singles – Doubles	(Israel) Anna Smashnova-Pistolesi; 6–2, 3–6, 6–2	(Australia) Alicia Molik	(Croatia) Jelena Kostanić (United States) Amy Frazier	(Russia) Alina Jidkova (Germany) Marlene Weingärtner (Slovakia) Ľubomíra Kurhajcová (Spain) Magüi Serna
17 May	Wien Energie Grand Prix; Vienna, Austria; Tier III event Clay – $170,000 – 30S/16D; Singles – Doubles	(United States) Martina Navratilova (United States) Lisa Raymond; 6–2, 7–5	(Zimbabwe) Cara Black (Australia) Rennae Stubbs	(Croatia) Jelena Kostanić (United States) Amy Frazier	(Russia) Alina Jidkova (Germany) Marlene Weingärtner (Slovakia) Ľubomíra Kurhajcová (Spain) Magüi Serna
24 May; 31 May	French Open; Paris, France; Grand Slam; Clay – $5,982,126 – 128S/96Q/64D/32X; Singles – Doubles – Mixed doubles	(Russia) Anastasia Myskina; 6–1, 6–2	(Russia) Elena Dementieva	(Argentina) Paola Suárez (United States) Jennifer Capriati	(Russia) Maria Sharapova (France) Amélie Mauresmo (United States) Venus Williams (United States) Serena Williams
24 May; 31 May	French Open; Paris, France; Grand Slam; Clay – $5,982,126 – 128S/96Q/64D/32X; Singles – Doubles – Mixed doubles	(Spain) Virginia Ruano Pascual (Argentina) Paola Suárez; 6–0, 6–3	(Russia) Svetlana Kuznetsova (Russia) Elena Likhovtseva	(Argentina) Paola Suárez (United States) Jennifer Capriati	(Russia) Maria Sharapova (France) Amélie Mauresmo (United States) Venus Williams (United States) Serena Williams
24 May; 31 May	French Open; Paris, France; Grand Slam; Clay – $5,982,126 – 128S/96Q/64D/32X; Singles – Doubles – Mixed doubles	(France) Richard Gasquet (France) Tatiana Golovin; 6–3, 6–4	(Zimbabwe) Wayne Black (Zimbabwe) Cara Black	(Argentina) Paola Suárez (United States) Jennifer Capriati	(Russia) Maria Sharapova (France) Amélie Mauresmo (United States) Venus Williams (United States) Serena Williams

=== June ===
Week	Tournament	Champions	Runners-up	Semifinalists	Quarterfinalists
7 Jun	DFS Classic; Birmingham, Great Britain; Tier III event Grass – $170,000 – 56S/16D; Singles – Doubles	(Russia) Maria Sharapova; 4–6, 6–2, 6–1	(France) Tatiana Golovin	(France) Émilie Loit (Switzerland) Patty Schnyder	(Luxembourg) Anne Kremer (Thailand) Tamarine Tanasugarn (Australia) Alicia Molik (Japan) Saori Obata
7 Jun	DFS Classic; Birmingham, Great Britain; Tier III event Grass – $170,000 – 56S/16D; Singles – Doubles	(Russia) Maria Kirilenko (Russia) Maria Sharapova; 6–2, 6–1	(Australia) Lisa McShea (Venezuela) Milagros Sequera	(France) Émilie Loit (Switzerland) Patty Schnyder	(Luxembourg) Anne Kremer (Thailand) Tamarine Tanasugarn (Australia) Alicia Molik (Japan) Saori Obata
14 Jun	Hastings Direct International Championships; Eastbourne, Great Britain; Tier II event Grass – $585,000 – 28S/16D; Singles – Doubles	(Russia) Svetlana Kuznetsova; 2–6, 7–6^{(7–2)}, 6–4	(Slovakia) Daniela Hantuchová	(France) Amélie Mauresmo (Russia) Vera Zvonareva	(Bulgaria) Magdalena Maleeva (Japan) Ai Sugiyama (Spain) María Sánchez Lorenzo (Slovenia) Tina Pisnik
14 Jun	Hastings Direct International Championships; Eastbourne, Great Britain; Tier II event Grass – $585,000 – 28S/16D; Singles – Doubles	(Australia) Alicia Molik (Spain) Magüi Serna; 6–4, 6–4	(Russia) Svetlana Kuznetsova (Russia) Elena Likhovtseva	(France) Amélie Mauresmo (Russia) Vera Zvonareva	(Bulgaria) Magdalena Maleeva (Japan) Ai Sugiyama (Spain) María Sánchez Lorenzo (Slovenia) Tina Pisnik
14 Jun	Ordina Open 's-Hertogenbosch, Netherlands; Tier III event Grass – $170,000 – 32S/16D; Singles – Doubles	(France) Mary Pierce; 7–6^{(8–6)}, 6–2	(Czech Republic) Klára Koukalová	(Russia) Lina Krasnoroutskaya (Spain) Anabel Medina Garrigues	(Federal Republic of Yugoslavia) Jelena Janković (Luxembourg) Anne Kremer (Austria) Barbara Schett (Luxembourg) Claudine Schaul
14 Jun	Ordina Open 's-Hertogenbosch, Netherlands; Tier III event Grass – $170,000 – 32S/16D; Singles – Doubles	(Australia) Lisa McShea (Venezuela) Milagros Sequera; 7–6^{(7–3)}, 6–3	(Croatia) Jelena Kostanić (Luxembourg) Claudine Schaul	(Russia) Lina Krasnoroutskaya (Spain) Anabel Medina Garrigues	(Federal Republic of Yugoslavia) Jelena Janković (Luxembourg) Anne Kremer (Austria) Barbara Schett (Luxembourg) Claudine Schaul
21 Jun; 28 Jun	Wimbledon Championships; London, Great Britain; Grand Slam; Grass – $6,063,070 – 128S/96Q/64D/32X; Singles – Doubles – Mixed doubles	(Russia) Maria Sharapova; 6–1, 6–4	(United States) Serena Williams	(France) Amélie Mauresmo (United States) Lindsay Davenport	(United States) Jennifer Capriati (Argentina) Paola Suárez (Croatia) Karolina Šprem (Japan) Ai Sugiyama
21 Jun; 28 Jun	Wimbledon Championships; London, Great Britain; Grand Slam; Grass – $6,063,070 – 128S/96Q/64D/32X; Singles – Doubles – Mixed doubles	(Zimbabwe) Cara Black (Australia) Rennae Stubbs; 6–3, 7–6^{(7–5)}	(South Africa) Liezel Huber (Japan) Ai Sugiyama	(France) Amélie Mauresmo (United States) Lindsay Davenport	(United States) Jennifer Capriati (Argentina) Paola Suárez (Croatia) Karolina Šprem (Japan) Ai Sugiyama
21 Jun; 28 Jun	Wimbledon Championships; London, Great Britain; Grand Slam; Grass – $6,063,070 – 128S/96Q/64D/32X; Singles – Doubles – Mixed doubles	(Zimbabwe) Wayne Black (Zimbabwe) Cara Black; 3–6, 7–6(8), 6–4	(Australia) Todd Woodbridge (Australia) Alicia Molik	(France) Amélie Mauresmo (United States) Lindsay Davenport	(United States) Jennifer Capriati (Argentina) Paola Suárez (Croatia) Karolina Šprem (Japan) Ai Sugiyama

=== July ===
Week	Tournament	Champions	Runners-up	Semifinalists	Quarterfinalists
5 Jul	Fed Cup: Quarterfinals; Rimini, Italy, clay (red); Jerez de la Frontera, Spain, clay (red); Buenos Aires, Argentina, clay (red); Innsbruck, Austria, clay (red)	Quarterfinal winners France 3–2; Spain 3–2; Russia 4–1; Austria 4–1	Quarterfinal losers Italy; Belgium; Argentina; United States		
12 Jul	Bank of the West Classic; Stanford, United States; Tier II event Hard – $585,000 – 28S/16D; Singles – Doubles	(United States) Lindsay Davenport; 7–6^{(7–4)}, 5–7, 7–6^{(7–4)}	(United States) Venus Williams	(United States) Amy Frazier (Venezuela) María Vento-Kabchi	(Israel) Anna Smashnova-Pistolesi (Switzerland) Patty Schnyder (Italy) Francesca Schiavone (United States) Mashona Washington
12 Jul	Bank of the West Classic; Stanford, United States; Tier II event Hard – $585,000 – 28S/16D; Singles – Doubles	(Greece) Eleni Daniilidou (Australia) Nicole Pratt; 6–2, 6–4	(Czech Republic) Iveta Benešová (Luxembourg) Claudine Schaul	(United States) Amy Frazier (Venezuela) María Vento-Kabchi	(Israel) Anna Smashnova-Pistolesi (Switzerland) Patty Schnyder (Italy) Francesca Schiavone (United States) Mashona Washington
19 Jul	JPMorgan Chase Open; Carson, United States; Tier II event Hard – $585,000 – 56S/16D; Singles – Doubles	(United States) Lindsay Davenport; 6–1, 6–3	(United States) Serena Williams	(Russia) Elena Dementieva (United States) Venus Williams	(Russia) Vera Zvonareva (Russia) Svetlana Kuznetsova (Russia) Nadia Petrova (Italy) Francesca Schiavone
19 Jul	JPMorgan Chase Open; Carson, United States; Tier II event Hard – $585,000 – 56S/16D; Singles – Doubles	(Russia) Nadia Petrova (United States) Meghann Shaughnessy; 6–7^{(2–7)}, 6–4, 6–3	(Spain) Conchita Martínez (Spain) Virginia Ruano Pascual	(Russia) Elena Dementieva (United States) Venus Williams	(Russia) Vera Zvonareva (Russia) Svetlana Kuznetsova (Russia) Nadia Petrova (Italy) Francesca Schiavone
19 Jul	Internazionali Femminili di Palermo; Palermo, Italy; Tier V event Clay – $110,000 – 32S/29Q/16D; Singles – Doubles	(Spain) Anabel Medina Garrigues; 6–4, 6–4	(Italy) Flavia Pennetta	(Slovenia) Katarina Srebotnik (Czech Republic) Denisa Chládková	(Czech Republic) Klára Koukalová (Slovakia) Ľudmila Cervanová (Italy) Antonella Serra Zanetti (Germany) Anna-Lena Grönefeld
19 Jul	Internazionali Femminili di Palermo; Palermo, Italy; Tier V event Clay – $110,000 – 32S/29Q/16D; Singles – Doubles	(Spain) Anabel Medina Garrigues (Spain) Arantxa Sánchez Vicario; 6–3, 7–6^{(7–4)}	(Slovakia) Ľubomíra Kurhajcová (Slovakia) Henrieta Nagyová	(Slovenia) Katarina Srebotnik (Czech Republic) Denisa Chládková	(Czech Republic) Klára Koukalová (Slovakia) Ľudmila Cervanová (Italy) Antonella Serra Zanetti (Germany) Anna-Lena Grönefeld
26 Jul	Acura Classic; San Diego, United States; Tier I event Hard – $1,300,000 – 56S/24D; Singles – Doubles	(United States) Lindsay Davenport; 6–1, 6–1	(Russia) Anastasia Myskina	(Russia) Vera Zvonareva (Russia) Elena Dementieva	(United States) Serena Williams (Russia) Maria Sharapova (Japan) Ai Sugiyama (United States) Amy Frazier
26 Jul	Acura Classic; San Diego, United States; Tier I event Hard – $1,300,000 – 56S/24D; Singles – Doubles	(Zimbabwe) Cara Black (Australia) Rennae Stubbs; 4–6, 6–1, 6–4	(Spain) Virginia Ruano Pascual (Argentina) Paola Suárez	(Russia) Vera Zvonareva (Russia) Elena Dementieva	(United States) Serena Williams (Russia) Maria Sharapova (Japan) Ai Sugiyama (United States) Amy Frazier

=== August ===
Week	Tournament	Champions	Runners-up	Semifinalists		Quarterfinalists
2 Aug	Rogers AT&T Cup; Montreal, Canada; Tier I event Hard – $1,300,000 – 56S/28D; Singles – Doubles	(France) Amélie Mauresmo; 6–1, 6–0	(Russia) Elena Likhovtseva	(Russia) Anastasia Myskina (Russia) Vera Zvonareva		(Bulgaria) Magdalena Maleeva (United States) Jennifer Capriati (France) Tatiana Golovin (Croatia) Karolina Šprem
2 Aug	Rogers AT&T Cup; Montreal, Canada; Tier I event Hard – $1,300,000 – 56S/28D; Singles – Doubles	(Japan) Shinobu Asagoe (Japan) Ai Sugiyama; 6–0, 6–3	(South Africa) Liezel Huber (Thailand) Tamarine Tanasugarn	(Russia) Anastasia Myskina (Russia) Vera Zvonareva		(Bulgaria) Magdalena Maleeva (United States) Jennifer Capriati (France) Tatiana Golovin (Croatia) Karolina Šprem
2 Aug	Nordea Nordic Light Open; Stockholm, Sweden; Tier IV event Hard – $140,000 – 32S/26Q/16D; Singles – Doubles	(Australia) Alicia Molik; 6–1, 6–1	(Ukraine) Tatiana Perebiynis	(Czech Republic) Sandra Kleinová (Italy) Silvia Farina Elia		(Slovakia) Henrieta Nagyová (Italy) Maria Elena Camerin (Czech Republic) Denisa Chládková (France) Séverine Brémond
2 Aug	Nordea Nordic Light Open; Stockholm, Sweden; Tier IV event Hard – $140,000 – 32S/26Q/16D; Singles – Doubles	(Australia) Alicia Molik (Austria) Barbara Schett; 6–3, 6–3	(Switzerland) Emmanuelle Gagliardi (Germany) Anna-Lena Grönefeld	(Czech Republic) Sandra Kleinová (Italy) Silvia Farina Elia		(Slovakia) Henrieta Nagyová (Italy) Maria Elena Camerin (Czech Republic) Denisa Chládková (France) Séverine Brémond
9 Aug	Idea Prokom Open; Sopot, Poland; Tier III event Clay – $300,000 – 30S/16D; Singles – Doubles	(Italy) Flavia Pennetta; 7–5, 3–6, 6–3	(Czech Republic) Klára Koukalová	(Russia) Anastasia Myskina (Poland) Marta Domachowska		(Czech Republic) Iveta Benešová (Slovakia) Ľubomíra Kurhajcová (Spain) Nuria Llagostera Vives (Spain) Marta Marrero
9 Aug	Idea Prokom Open; Sopot, Poland; Tier III event Clay – $300,000 – 30S/16D; Singles – Doubles	(Spain) Nuria Llagostera Vives (Spain) Marta Marrero; 6–4, 6–3	(Poland) Klaudia Jans (Poland) Alicja Rosolska	(Russia) Anastasia Myskina (Poland) Marta Domachowska		(Czech Republic) Iveta Benešová (Slovakia) Ľubomíra Kurhajcová (Spain) Nuria Llagostera Vives (Spain) Marta Marrero
9 Aug	Vancouver Open; Vancouver, Canada; Tier V event Hard – $110,000 – 32S/16D; Singles – Doubles	(Czech Republic) Nicole Vaidišová; 2–6, 6–4, 6–2	(United States) Laura Granville	(France) Camille Pin (Russia) Alina Jidkova		(Bulgaria) Sesil Karatantcheva (United States) Lindsay Lee-Waters (Italy) Rita Grande (Venezuela) Milagros Sequera
9 Aug	Vancouver Open; Vancouver, Canada; Tier V event Hard – $110,000 – 32S/16D; Singles – Doubles	(United States) Bethanie Mattek (United States) Abigail Spears; 6–3, 6–3	(Belgium) Els Callens (Germany) Anna-Lena Grönefeld	(France) Camille Pin (Russia) Alina Jidkova		(Bulgaria) Sesil Karatantcheva (United States) Lindsay Lee-Waters (Italy) Rita Grande (Venezuela) Milagros Sequera
16 Aug	Summer Olympic Games; Athens, Greece; Hard – $0 – 64S/32D; Singles – Doubles	Gold	Silver	Bronze	Fourth place	(France) Mary Pierce (Italy) Francesca Schiavone (Japan) Ai Sugiyama (Russia) Svetlana Kuznetsova
16 Aug	Summer Olympic Games; Athens, Greece; Hard – $0 – 64S/32D; Singles – Doubles	(Belgium) Justine Henin-Hardenne; 6–3, 6–3	(France) Amélie Mauresmo	(Australia) Alicia Molik; 6–3, 6–4	(Russia) Anastasia Myskina	(France) Mary Pierce (Italy) Francesca Schiavone (Japan) Ai Sugiyama (Russia) Svetlana Kuznetsova
16 Aug	Summer Olympic Games; Athens, Greece; Hard – $0 – 64S/32D; Singles – Doubles	(China) Li Ting (China) Sun Tiantian; 6–3, 6–3	(Spain) Conchita Martínez (Spain) Virginia Ruano Pascual	(Argentina) Paola Suárez (Argentina) Patricia Tarabini; 6–3, 6–3	(Japan) Shinobu Asagoe (Japan) Ai Sugiyama	(France) Mary Pierce (Italy) Francesca Schiavone (Japan) Ai Sugiyama (Russia) Svetlana Kuznetsova
16 Aug	W&S Financial Group Women's Open; Mason, United States; Tier III event Hard – $170,000 – 30S/16D; Singles – Doubles	(United States) Lindsay Davenport; 6–3, 6–2	(Russia) Vera Zvonareva	(France) Marion Bartoli (United States) Amy Frazier		(Italy) Flavia Pennetta (United States) Laura Granville (Tunisia) Selima Sfar (China) Peng Shuai
16 Aug	W&S Financial Group Women's Open; Mason, United States; Tier III event Hard – $170,000 – 30S/16D; Singles – Doubles	(United States) Jill Craybas (Germany) Marlene Weingärtner; 7–5, 7–6^{(7–2)}	(Switzerland) Emmanuelle Gagliardi (Germany) Anna-Lena Grönefeld	(France) Marion Bartoli (United States) Amy Frazier		(Italy) Flavia Pennetta (United States) Laura Granville (Tunisia) Selima Sfar (China) Peng Shuai
23 Aug	Pilot Pen Tennis; New Haven, United States; Tier II event Hard – $585,000 – 28S/16D; Singles – Doubles	(Russia) Elena Bovina; 6–2, 2–6, 7–5	(France) Nathalie Dechy	(United States) Lisa Raymond (Russia) Elena Dementieva		(Slovakia) Daniela Hantuchová (United States) Jennifer Capriati (United States) Mashona Washington (Federal Republic of Yugoslavia) Jelena Janković
23 Aug	Pilot Pen Tennis; New Haven, United States; Tier II event Hard – $585,000 – 28S/16D; Singles – Doubles	(Russia) Nadia Petrova (United States) Meghann Shaughnessy; 6–1, 1–6, 7–6^{(7–4)}	(United States) Martina Navratilova (United States) Lisa Raymond	(United States) Lisa Raymond (Russia) Elena Dementieva		(Slovakia) Daniela Hantuchová (United States) Jennifer Capriati (United States) Mashona Washington (Federal Republic of Yugoslavia) Jelena Janković
23 Aug	Forest Hills Tennis Classic; Forest Hills, United States; Tier V event Hard – $65,882 – 16S; Singles	(Russia) Elena Likhovtseva; 6–2, 6–2	(Czech Republic) Iveta Benešová	(Spain) Anabel Medina Garrigues (Belgium) Kirsten Flipkens		(France) Marion Bartoli (Puerto Rico) Kristina Brandi (Slovenia) Katarina Srebotnik (France) Émilie Loit
30 Aug; 6 Sep	U.S. Open; New York City, United States; Grand Slam; Hard – $7,017,780 – 128S/96Q/64D/32X; Singles – Doubles – Mixed doubles	(Russia) Svetlana Kuznetsova; 6–3, 7–5	(Russia) Elena Dementieva	(United States) Lindsay Davenport (United States) Jennifer Capriati		(Russia) Nadia Petrova (Japan) Shinobu Asagoe (United States) Serena Williams (France) Amélie Mauresmo
30 Aug; 6 Sep	U.S. Open; New York City, United States; Grand Slam; Hard – $7,017,780 – 128S/96Q/64D/32X; Singles – Doubles – Mixed doubles	(Spain) Virginia Ruano Pascual (Argentina) Paola Suárez; 6–4, 7–5	(Russia) Svetlana Kuznetsova (Russia) Elena Likhovtseva	(United States) Lindsay Davenport (United States) Jennifer Capriati		(Russia) Nadia Petrova (Japan) Shinobu Asagoe (United States) Serena Williams (France) Amélie Mauresmo
30 Aug; 6 Sep	U.S. Open; New York City, United States; Grand Slam; Hard – $7,017,780 – 128S/96Q/64D/32X; Singles – Doubles – Mixed doubles	(United States) Bob Bryan (Russia) Vera Zvonareva; 6–3, 6–4	(Australia) Todd Woodbridge (Australia) Alicia Molik	(United States) Lindsay Davenport (United States) Jennifer Capriati		(Russia) Nadia Petrova (Japan) Shinobu Asagoe (United States) Serena Williams (France) Amélie Mauresmo

=== September ===
Week	Tournament	Champions	Runners-up	Semifinalists	Quarterfinalists
13 Sep	Wismilak International; Bali, Indonesia; Tier III event Hard – $225,000 – 30S/16D; Singles – Doubles	(Russia) Svetlana Kuznetsova; 6–1, 6–4	(Germany) Marlene Weingärtner	(Italy) Maria Elena Camerin (Russia) Nadia Petrova	(Argentina) Gisela Dulko (South Korea) Cho Yoon-jeong (Italy) Tathiana Garbin (Indonesia) Angelique Widjaja
13 Sep	Wismilak International; Bali, Indonesia; Tier III event Hard – $225,000 – 30S/16D; Singles – Doubles	(Russia) Anastasia Myskina (Japan) Ai Sugiyama; 6–3, 7–5	(Russia) Svetlana Kuznetsova (Spain) Arantxa Sánchez Vicario	(Italy) Maria Elena Camerin (Russia) Nadia Petrova	(Argentina) Gisela Dulko (South Korea) Cho Yoon-jeong (Italy) Tathiana Garbin (Indonesia) Angelique Widjaja
20 Sep	China Open; Beijing, China; Tier II event Hard – $585,000 – 28S/16D; Singles – Doubles	(United States) Serena Williams; 4–6, 7–5, 6–4	(Russia) Svetlana Kuznetsova	(Russia) Vera Zvonareva (Russia) Maria Sharapova	(Russia) Nadia Petrova (Spain) Anabel Medina Garrigues (Federal Republic of Yugoslavia) Jelena Janković (Argentina) Gisela Dulko
20 Sep	China Open; Beijing, China; Tier II event Hard – $585,000 – 28S/16D; Singles – Doubles	(Switzerland) Emmanuelle Gagliardi (Russia) Dinara Safina; 6–4, 6–4	(Argentina) Gisela Dulko (Venezuela) María Vento-Kabchi	(Russia) Vera Zvonareva (Russia) Maria Sharapova	(Russia) Nadia Petrova (Spain) Anabel Medina Garrigues (Federal Republic of Yugoslavia) Jelena Janković (Argentina) Gisela Dulko
27 Sep	Gaz de France Stars; Hasselt, Belgium; Tier III event Hard (i) – $170,000 – 30S/16D; Singles – Doubles	(Russia) Elena Dementieva; 0–6, 6–0, 6–4	(Russia) Elena Bovina	(Italy) Maria Elena Camerin (Belgium) Kim Clijsters	(Czech Republic) Denisa Chládková (Spain) Virginia Ruano Pascual (Italy) Francesca Schiavone (Bulgaria) Magdalena Maleeva
27 Sep	Gaz de France Stars; Hasselt, Belgium; Tier III event Hard (i) – $170,000 – 30S/16D; Singles – Doubles	(United States) Jennifer Russell (Italy) Mara Santangelo; 6–3, 7–5	(Spain) Nuria Llagostera Vives (Spain) Marta Marrero	(Italy) Maria Elena Camerin (Belgium) Kim Clijsters	(Czech Republic) Denisa Chládková (Spain) Virginia Ruano Pascual (Italy) Francesca Schiavone (Bulgaria) Magdalena Maleeva
27 Sep	Guangzhou Women's Open; Guangzhou, China; Tier III event Hard – $170,000 – 30S/29Q/16D; Singles – Doubles	(China) Li Na; 6–3, 6–4	(Slovakia) Martina Suchá	(Czech Republic) Barbora Strýcová (China) Li Ting	(Russia) Dinara Safina (Thailand) Tamarine Tanasugarn (China) Peng Shuai (Puerto Rico) Kristina Brandi
27 Sep	Guangzhou Women's Open; Guangzhou, China; Tier III event Hard – $170,000 – 30S/29Q/16D; Singles – Doubles	(China) Li Ting (China) Sun Tiantian; 6–4, 6–1	(China) Yang Shujing (China) Yu Ying	(Czech Republic) Barbora Strýcová (China) Li Ting	(Russia) Dinara Safina (Thailand) Tamarine Tanasugarn (China) Peng Shuai (Puerto Rico) Kristina Brandi
27 Sep	Hansol Korea Open Tennis Championships; Seoul, South Korea; Tier IV event Hard – $140,000 – 32S/16D; Singles – Doubles	(Russia) Maria Sharapova; 6–1, 6–1	(Poland) Marta Domachowska	(Luxembourg) Anne Kremer (United States) Abigail Spears	(Australia) Samantha Stosur (Croatia) Sanda Mamić (Croatia) Silvija Talaja (Israel) Shahar Pe'er
27 Sep	Hansol Korea Open Tennis Championships; Seoul, South Korea; Tier IV event Hard – $140,000 – 32S/16D; Singles – Doubles	(South Korea) Cho Yoon-jeong (South Korea) Jeon Mi-ra; 6–3, 1–6, 7–5	(Chinese Taipei) Chuang Chia-jung (Chinese Taipei) Hsieh Su-wei	(Luxembourg) Anne Kremer (United States) Abigail Spears	(Australia) Samantha Stosur (Croatia) Sanda Mamić (Croatia) Silvija Talaja (Israel) Shahar Pe'er

=== October ===
Week	Tournament	Champions	Runners-up	Semifinalists	Quarterfinalists
4 Oct	Porsche Tennis Grand Prix; Filderstadt, Germany; Tier II event Hard (i) – $650,000 – 28S/16D; Singles – Doubles	(United States) Lindsay Davenport; 6–2 ret.	(France) Amélie Mauresmo	(Russia) Svetlana Kuznetsova (Russia) Anastasia Myskina	(United States) Lisa Raymond (Colombia) Fabiola Zuluaga (Russia) Elena Likhovtseva (Federal Republic of Yugoslavia) Jelena Janković
4 Oct	Porsche Tennis Grand Prix; Filderstadt, Germany; Tier II event Hard (i) – $650,000 – 28S/16D; Singles – Doubles	(Zimbabwe) Cara Black (Australia) Rennae Stubbs; 6–3, 6–2	(Germany) Anna-Lena Grönefeld (Germany) Julia Schruff	(Russia) Svetlana Kuznetsova (Russia) Anastasia Myskina	(United States) Lisa Raymond (Colombia) Fabiola Zuluaga (Russia) Elena Likhovtseva (Federal Republic of Yugoslavia) Jelena Janković
4 Oct	Japan Open Tennis Championships; Tokyo, Japan; Tier III event Hard – $170,000 – 30S/16D; Singles – Doubles	(Russia) Maria Sharapova; 6–0, 6–1	(United States) Mashona Washington	(Thailand) Tamarine Tanasugarn (Czech Republic) Klára Koukalová	(France) Youlia Fedossova (Hungary) Anikó Kapros (Russia) Evgenia Linetskaya (Czech Republic) Nicole Vaidišová
4 Oct	Japan Open Tennis Championships; Tokyo, Japan; Tier III event Hard – $170,000 – 30S/16D; Singles – Doubles	(Japan) Shinobu Asagoe (Slovenia) Katarina Srebotnik; 6–1, 6–4	(United States) Jennifer Hopkins (United States) Mashona Washington	(Thailand) Tamarine Tanasugarn (Czech Republic) Klára Koukalová	(France) Youlia Fedossova (Hungary) Anikó Kapros (Russia) Evgenia Linetskaya (Czech Republic) Nicole Vaidišová
11 Oct	Kremlin Cup; Moscow, Russia; Tier I event Carpet (i) – $1,300,000 – 28S/16D; Singles – Doubles	(Russia) Anastasia Myskina; 7–5, 6–0	(Russia) Elena Dementieva	(Russia) Elena Bovina (United States) Lindsay Davenport	(United States) Venus Williams (Russia) Svetlana Kuznetsova (Russia) Vera Zvonareva (Italy) Francesca Schiavone
11 Oct	Kremlin Cup; Moscow, Russia; Tier I event Carpet (i) – $1,300,000 – 28S/16D; Singles – Doubles	(Russia) Anastasia Myskina (Russia) Vera Zvonareva; 6–3, 4–6, 6–2	(Spain) Virginia Ruano Pascual (Argentina) Paola Suárez	(Russia) Elena Bovina (United States) Lindsay Davenport	(United States) Venus Williams (Russia) Svetlana Kuznetsova (Russia) Vera Zvonareva (Italy) Francesca Schiavone
11 Oct	Tashkent Open; Tashkent, Uzbekistan; Tier IV event Hard – $140,000 – 32S/16D; Singles – Doubles	(Czech Republic) Nicole Vaidišová; 5–7, 6–3, 6–2	(France) Virginie Razzano	(Germany) Anca Barna (United States) Meghann Shaughnessy	(Italy) Antonella Serra Zanetti (Spain) Marta Marrero (Spain) Arantxa Parra Santonja (Ukraine) Olga Savchuk
11 Oct	Tashkent Open; Tashkent, Uzbekistan; Tier IV event Hard – $140,000 – 32S/16D; Singles – Doubles	(Italy) Adriana Serra Zanetti (Italy) Antonella Serra Zanetti; 1–6, 6–3, 6–4	(France) Marion Bartoli (Italy) Mara Santangelo	(Germany) Anca Barna (United States) Meghann Shaughnessy	(Italy) Antonella Serra Zanetti (Spain) Marta Marrero (Spain) Arantxa Parra Santonja (Ukraine) Olga Savchuk
18 Oct	Swisscom Challenge; Zürich, Switzerland; Tier I event Hard (i) – $1,300,000 – 28S/16D; Singles – Doubles	(Australia) Alicia Molik; 4–6, 6–2, 6–3	(Russia) Maria Sharapova	(Switzerland) Patty Schnyder (Russia) Elena Dementieva	(Argentina) Paola Suárez (Russia) Nadia Petrova (United States) Venus Williams (Japan) Ai Sugiyama
18 Oct	Swisscom Challenge; Zürich, Switzerland; Tier I event Hard (i) – $1,300,000 – 28S/16D; Singles – Doubles	(Zimbabwe) Cara Black (Australia) Rennae Stubbs; 6–4, 6–4	(Spain) Virginia Ruano Pascual (Argentina) Paola Suárez	(Switzerland) Patty Schnyder (Russia) Elena Dementieva	(Argentina) Paola Suárez (Russia) Nadia Petrova (United States) Venus Williams (Japan) Ai Sugiyama
25 Oct	Generali Ladies Linz; Linz, Austria; Tier II event Hard (i) – $585,000 – 28S/16D; Singles – Doubles	(France) Amélie Mauresmo; 6–2, 6–0	(Russia) Elena Bovina	(Federal Republic of Yugoslavia) Jelena Janković (Russia) Nadia Petrova	(Japan) Ai Sugiyama (Russia) Vera Zvonareva (United States) Meghann Shaughnessy (Russia) Alina Jidkova
25 Oct	Generali Ladies Linz; Linz, Austria; Tier II event Hard (i) – $585,000 – 28S/16D; Singles – Doubles	(Slovakia) Janette Husárová (Russia) Elena Likhovtseva; 6–2, 7–5	(France) Nathalie Dechy (Switzerland) Patty Schnyder	(Federal Republic of Yugoslavia) Jelena Janković (Russia) Nadia Petrova	(Japan) Ai Sugiyama (Russia) Vera Zvonareva (United States) Meghann Shaughnessy (Russia) Alina Jidkova
25 Oct	SEAT Open; Kockelscheuer, Luxembourg; Tier III event Hard (i) – $225,000 – 30S/16D; Singles – Doubles	(Australia) Alicia Molik; 6–3, 6–4	(Russia) Dinara Safina	(Italy) Silvia Farina Elia (Spain) Anabel Medina Garrigues	(Federal Republic of Yugoslavia) Ana Ivanovic (Madagascar) Dally Randriantefy (Czech Republic) Květa Peschke (France) Tatiana Golovin
25 Oct	SEAT Open; Kockelscheuer, Luxembourg; Tier III event Hard (i) – $225,000 – 30S/16D; Singles – Doubles	(Spain) Virginia Ruano Pascual (Argentina) Paola Suárez; 6–1, 6–7^{(1–7)}, 6–3	(United States) Jill Craybas (Germany) Marlene Weingärtner	(Italy) Silvia Farina Elia (Spain) Anabel Medina Garrigues	(Federal Republic of Yugoslavia) Ana Ivanovic (Madagascar) Dally Randriantefy (Czech Republic) Květa Peschke (France) Tatiana Golovin

=== November ===
Week	Tournament	Champions	Runners-up	Semifinalists	Quarterfinalists
1 Nov	Advanta Championships; Philadelphia, United States; Tier II event Hard (i) – $585,000 – 28S/16D; Singles – Doubles	(France) Amélie Mauresmo; 3–6, 6–2, 6–2	(Russia) Vera Zvonareva	(Russia) Maria Sharapova (Russia) Nadia Petrova	(United States) Venus Williams (Australia) Alicia Molik (United States) Jennifer Capriati (Russia) Anastasia Myskina
1 Nov	Advanta Championships; Philadelphia, United States; Tier II event Hard (i) – $585,000 – 28S/16D; Singles – Doubles	(Australia) Alicia Molik (United States) Lisa Raymond; 7–5, 6–4	(South Africa) Liezel Huber (United States) Corina Morariu	(Russia) Maria Sharapova (Russia) Nadia Petrova	(United States) Venus Williams (Australia) Alicia Molik (United States) Jennifer Capriati (Russia) Anastasia Myskina
1 Nov	Bell Challenge; Quebec City, Canada; Tier III event Carpet (i) – $170,000 – 32S/16D; Singles – Doubles	(Slovakia) Martina Suchá; 7–5, 3–6, 6–2	(United States) Abigail Spears	(Russia) Alina Jidkova (Argentina) María Emilia Salerni	(France) Mary Pierce (Slovakia) Ľubomíra Kurhajcová (Bulgaria) Sesil Karatantcheva (Canada) Mélanie Gloria
1 Nov	Bell Challenge; Quebec City, Canada; Tier III event Carpet (i) – $170,000 – 32S/16D; Singles – Doubles	(United States) Carly Gullickson (Argentina) María Emilia Salerni; 7–5, 7–5	(Belgium) Els Callens (Australia) Samantha Stosur	(Russia) Alina Jidkova (Argentina) María Emilia Salerni	(France) Mary Pierce (Slovakia) Ľubomíra Kurhajcová (Bulgaria) Sesil Karatantcheva (Canada) Mélanie Gloria
8 Nov	WTA Tour Championships; Los Angeles, United States; Year-end Championship; Hard – $3,000,000 – 8S (round robin)/4D; Singles – Doubles	(Russia) Maria Sharapova; 4–6, 6–2, 6–4	(United States) Serena Williams	(Russia) Anastasia Myskina (France) Amélie Mauresmo	(United States) Lindsay Davenport (Russia) Elena Dementieva (Russia) Svetlana Kuznetsova (Russia) Vera Zvonareva
8 Nov	WTA Tour Championships; Los Angeles, United States; Year-end Championship; Hard – $3,000,000 – 8S (round robin)/4D; Singles – Doubles	(Russia) Nadia Petrova (United States) Meghann Shaughnessy; 7–5, 6–2	(Zimbabwe) Cara Black (Australia) Rennae Stubbs	(Russia) Anastasia Myskina (France) Amélie Mauresmo	(United States) Lindsay Davenport (Russia) Elena Dementieva (Russia) Svetlana Kuznetsova (Russia) Vera Zvonareva
22 Nov	Fed Cup: Final; Moscow, Russia, carpet (i)	Russia; 3–2	France	Spain 0–5; Belgium 0–5	

== Statistics ==
List of players and titles won, last name alphabetically:

- (United States) Lindsay Davenport – Tokyo Pan Pacific, Amelia Island, Stanford, Los Angeles, San Diego, Cincinnati and Filderstadt (7)
- (Belgium) Justine Henin-Hardenne – Sydney, Australian Open, Dubai, Indian Wells and Athens Olympics (5)
- (France) Amélie Mauresmo – Berlin, Rome, Montreal, Linz and Philadelphia (5)
- (Russia) Maria Sharapova – Birmingham, Wimbledon, Seoul, Tokyo and WTA Tour Championships (5)
- (Russia) Svetlana Kuznetsova – Eastbourne, U.S. Open and Bali (3)
- (Australia) Alicia Molik – Stockholm, Zurich and Luxembourg (3)
- (Russia) Anastasia Myskina – Doha, French Open and Moscow (3)
- (Belgium) Kim Clijsters – Paris and Antwerp (2)
- (France) Émilie Loit – Casablanca and Estoril (2)
- (Czech Republic) Nicole Vaidišová – Vancouver and Tashkent (2)
- (United States) Serena Williams – Miami and Beijing (2)
- (United States) Venus Williams – Charleston and Warsaw (2)
- (Federal Republic of Yugoslavia) Jelena Janković – Budapest (1)
- (Czech Republic) Iveta Benešová – Acapulco (1)
- (Russia) Elena Bovina – New Haven (1)
- (Greece) Eleni Daniilidou – Auckland (1)
- (Russia) Elena Dementieva – Hasselt (1)
- (United States) Amy Frazier – Hobart (1)
- (China) Li Na – Guangzhou (1)
- (Russia) Elena Likhovtseva – Forest Hills (1)
- (Spain) Anabel Medina Garrigues – Palermo (1)
- (Italy) Flavia Pennetta – Sopot (1)
- (France) Mary Pierce – 's-Hertogenbosch (1)
- (Australia) Nicole Pratt – Hyderabad (1)
- (Luxembourg) Claudine Schaul – Strasbourg (1)
- (Israel) Anna Smashnova-Pistolesi – Vienna (1)
- (Argentina) Paola Suárez – Canberra (1)
- (Slovakia) Martina Suchá – Quebec City (1)
- (Japan) Ai Sugiyama – Gold Coast (1)
- (Colombia) Fabiola Zuluaga – Bogotá (1)
- (Russia) Vera Zvonareva – Memphis (1)

The following players won their first title:

- (Australia) Nicole Pratt – Hyderabad
- (Czech Republic) Iveta Benešová – Acapulco
- (France) Émilie Loit – Casablanca
- (Federal Republic of Yugoslavia) Jelena Janković – Budapest
- (Luxembourg) Claudine Schaul – Strasbourg
- (Italy) Flavia Pennetta – Sopot
- (Czech Republic) Nicole Vaidišová – Vancouver
- (China) Li Na – Guangzhou

Titles won by nation:

- Russia – 15 (Memphis, Doha, French Open, Birmingham, Eastbourne, Wimbledon, New Haven, Forest Hills, U.S. Open, Bali, Hasselt, Seoul, Tokyo, Moscow and WTA Tour Championships)
- United States – 12 (Hobart, Tokyo Pan Pacific, Miami, Amelia Island, Charleston, Warsaw, Stanford, Los Angeles, San Diego, Cincinnati, Beijing and Filderstadt)
- France – 8 (Casablanca, Estoril, Berlin, Rome, 's-Hertogenbosch, Montreal, Linz and Philadelphia)
- Belgium – 7 (Sydney, Australian Open, Paris, Antwerp, Dubai, Indian Wells and Athens Olympics)
- Australia – 4 (Hyderabad, Stockholm, Zurich and Luxembourg)
- Czech Republic – 3 (Acapulco, Vancouver and Tashkent)
- Argentina – 1 (Canberra)
- China – 1 (Guangzhou)
- Colombia – 1 (Bogotá)
- Greece – 1 (Auckland)
- Israel – 1 (Vienna)
- Italy – 1 (Sopot)
- Japan – 1 (Gold Coast)
- Luxembourg – 1 (Strasbourg)
- Yugoslavia – 1 (Budapest)
- Slovakia – 1 (Quebec City)
- Spain – 1 (Palermo)

== Rankings ==
Below are the 2004 WTA year-end rankings:

No	Player Name	Nation	Points	2003	Change
1	Lindsay Davenport	USA	4,760	5	+4
2	Amélie Mauresmo	FRA	4,546	4	+2
3	Anastasia Myskina	RUS	4,012	7	+4
4	Maria Sharapova	RUS	3,536	32	+28
5	Svetlana Kuznetsova	RUS	3,533	36	+31
6	Elena Dementieva	RUS	3,448	8	+2
7	Serena Williams	USA	3,128	3	–4
8	Justine Henin-Hardenne	BEL	2,884	1	–7
9	Venus Williams	USA	2,400	11	+2
10	Jennifer Capriati	USA	2,359	6	–4
11	Vera Zvonareva	RUS	2,299	13	+2
12	Nadia Petrova	RUS	2,022	12	=
13	Alicia Molik	AUS	1,971	35	+22
14	Patty Schnyder	SUI	1,638	23	+9
15	Elena Bovina	RUS	1,598	21	+6
16	Paola Suárez	ARG	1,535	14	–2
17	Ai Sugiyama	JPN	1,469	10	–7
18	Karolina Šprem	CRO	1,452	59	+41
19	Francesca Schiavone	ITA	1,403	20	+1
20	Silvia Farina Elia	ITA	1,334	24	+4

=== Number 1 ranking ===
Holder	Date gained	Date forfeited
Justine Henin-Hardenne (BEL)	Year-End 2003	12 September 2004
Amélie Mauresmo (FRA)	13 September 2004	17 October 2004
Lindsay Davenport (USA)	18 October 2004	Year-End 2004

"Full 2004 Year-End Rankings" (PDF). Sony Ericsson WTA Tour. Archived from the original (PDF) on 2012-09-18.

=== Points distribution ===
Category	W	F	SF	QF	R16	R32	R64	R128	Q	Q3	Q2	Q1
Grand Slam (S)	650	456	292	162	90	56	32	2	26	21	12.5	2
Grand Slam (D)	650	456	292	162	90	56	2	–	22	–	–	–
WTA Championships (S)	485	340	218	121	67	–	–	–	–	–	–	–
WTA Championships (D)	485	340	218	121	–	–	–	–	–	–	–	–
Tier I $2,000,000 (S)	325	228	146	81	45	28	16	1	11	–	6.25	1
Tier I $2,000,000 (D)	325	228	146	81	45	1	–	–	20	–	–	–
Tier I $1,300,000 (56S)	300	210	135	75	42	25	1	–	10.5	–	5.75	1
Tier I $1,300,000 (28S)	300	210	135	75	42	1	–	–	18.5	10.5	5.75	1
Tier I $1,300,000 (28D)	300	210	135	75	42	1	–	–	18.5	–	–	–
Tier I $1,300,000 (16D)	300	210	135	75	1	–	–	–	19	–	–	–
Tier II $650,000 (28S)	220	154	99	55	29	1	–	–	13.25	7.75	4.5	1
Tier II $650,000 (16D)	220	154	99	55	1	–	–	–	13	–	–	–
Tier II $585,000 (56S)	195	137	88	49	25	14	1	–	6.75	–	4	1
Tier II $585,000 (28S)	195	137	88	49	25	1	–	–	11.75	6.75	4	1
Tier II $585,000 (16D)	195	137	88	49	1	–	–	–	11.75	–	–	–
Tier III $225,000 (30S)	145	103	66	37	19	1	–	–	4.5	–	2.75	1
Tier III $225,000 (16D)	145	103	66	37	1	–	–	–	–	–	–	–
Tier III $170,000 (56S)	120	85	55	30	16	9	1	–	3.75	–	2.25	1
Tier III $170,000 (30/32S, 32Q)	120	85	55	30	16	1	–	–	7.25	3.75	2.25	1
Tier III $170,000 (30/32S, 16Q)	120	85	55	30	16	1	–	–	3.75	–	2.25	1
Tier III $170,000 (16D)	120	85	55	30	1	–	–	–	7.5	–	–	–
Tier IV $140,000 (32S, 32Q)	95	67	43	24	12	1	–	–	5.5	3.5	2	1
Tier IV $140,000 (32S, 16Q)	95	67	43	24	12	1	–	–	3.5	–	2	1
Tier IV $140,000 (16D)	95	67	43	24	1	–	–	–	6.25	–	–	–
Tier V $110,000 (32S)	80	56	36	20	10	1	–	–	4.5	3	2	1
Tier V $110,000 (16S, 16D)	80	56	36	20	1	–	–	–	5	–	–	–

== See also ==
- 2004 ATP Tour
