= 2004 WTA Tour Championships =

- Date: November 10–15
- Edition: 34th
- Category: Year-end championships
- Draw: 8S (round robin) / 4D
- Prize money: $3,000,000
- Surface: Hard / indoor
- Location: Los Angeles, United States
- Venue: Staples Center

Champions

Singles
- (Russia) Maria Sharapova

Doubles
- (Russia) Nadia Petrova / (United States) Meghann Shaughnessy
- WTA Finals

The 2004 WTA Tour Championships was a women's round robin tennis tournament played on indoor hard courts at the Staples Center in Los Angeles, United States. It was the 34th edition of the year-end singles championships, the 29th edition of the year-end doubles championships, and was part of the 2004 WTA Tour. The tournament was held between November 10 and November 15, 2004. Sixth-seeded Maria Sharapova won the singles event, the first, and so far only, Russian to win the tournament, and earned $1,000,000 first-prize money as well as 485 ranking points.

Justine Henin-Hardenne had qualified for the tournament but withdrew due to illness (cytomegalovirus).

== Finals ==
=== Singles ===
(Russia) Maria Sharapova defeated (United States) Serena Williams, 4–6, 6–2, 6–4.

=== Doubles ===
(Russia) Nadia Petrova / (United States) Meghann Shaughnessy defeated (Zimbabwe) Cara Black / (Australia) Rennae Stubbs, 7–5, 6–2.

== Singles Championship Race ==
=== Singles ===
Players in gold have qualified for Los Angeles. Players in brown withdrawn. The low-ranked players in blue after them would be played as alternates in Los Angeles.

Rank	Player	1	2	3	4	5	6	7	8	9	10	11	12	13	14	15	16	17	Total points	Tourn
1	(United States) Lindsay Davenport	W 300+161	SF; 292+164	SF; 292+132	W 220+193	W 195+201	W 300+63	W 195+158	W 195+87	QF; 162+108	F 228+42	W 120+55	SF; 135+31	SF; 88+78	F 85+51	R16; 90+32	QF; 75+18		4,546	16
2	(France) Amélie Mauresmo	W 300+151	SF; 292+148	W 300+101	W 300+94	S 174+112	F 137+147	W 195+88	W 195+77	QF; 162+94	F 154+100	QF; 162+92	F 137+89	QF; 162+54	SF; 88+25	QF; 49+15	R32; 1+0		4,195	16
3	(Russia) Anastasia Myskina	W 650+436	W 300+176	F 210+105	QF; 162+140	W 195+87	SF; 146+64	SF; 135+54	SF; 94+56	SF; 99+38	R32; 56+36	QF; 75+10	QF; 49+30	SF; 66+12	QF; 49+23	QF; 49+2	R64; 32+8	R32; 1+0	3,646	18
3	(Russia) Anastasia Myskina	R16; 1+0																	3,646	18
4	(Russia) Svetlana Kuznetsova	W 650+366	F 137+140	F 137+127	W 195+63	F 137+62	F 137+60	W 145+49	SF; 99+46	QF; 75+62	QF; 75+53	QF; 81+29	QF; 62+45	R16; 90+16	QF; 49+38	QF; 75+2	QF; 30+45	R32; 56+12	3,558	21
4	(Russia) Svetlana Kuznetsova	R16; 42+15	R16; 45+8	R128; 2+0	R32; 1+0														3,558	21
5	(Russia) Elena Dementieva	F 456+386	F 456+350	F 228+152	F 210+112	SF; 135+58	SF; 135+48	W 120+43	SF; 88+68	SF; 88+18	QF; 49+27	QF; 49+4	R16; 42+8	R16; 42+4	R128; 2+0	R128; 2+0	R64; 1+0	R16; 1+0	3,386	21
5	(Russia) Elena Dementieva	R32; 1+0	R32; 1+0	R32; 1+0	R32; 1+0														3,386	21
6	(Russia) Maria Sharapova	W 650+372	F 210+100	QF; 162+88	W 120+52	SF; 88+50	W 120+17	W 95+17	SF; 88+14	R32; 56+36	R16; 42+47	QF; 75+10	R16; 45+33	R16; 42+30	R32; 56+16	SF; 55+16	R16; 42+8	R16; 45+5	2,947	19
6	(Russia) Maria Sharapova	R16; 42+2	R16; 1+0																2,947	19
7	(Belgium) Justine Henin-Hardenne	W 650+308	W 325+152	G 248+187	W 195+133	W 195+55	SF; 88+73	R16; 90+38	SF; 88+25	R64; 32+2									2,884	9
8	(United States) Serena Williams	F 456+248	W 325+103	W 195+128	QF; 162+116	F 137+101	QF; 162+48	SF; 135+49	QF; 75+33	QF; 49+30	R16; 42+2	R16; 1+0							2,597	11
9	(Russia) Vera Zvonareva	F 137+103	SF; 135+68	SF; 135+63	SF; 135+53	W 120+54	R16; 90+46	R16; 90+44	R16; 90+32	QF; 75+46	F 85+31	SF; 88+25	SF; 88+23	QF; 75+27	SF; 88+14	QF; 49+38	R32; 56+24	QF; 49+23	2,531	25
9	(Russia) Vera Zvonareva	R16; 45+12	QF; 49+8	R16; 25+10	R32; 28+4	R32; 25+4	R16; 16+4	R16; 1+0	R32; 1+0										2,531	25
10	(United States) Venus Williams	W 300+74	W 195+116	F 210+76	QF; 162+112	F 137+50	R16; 90+64	SF; 88+37	QF; 81+41	QF; 75+25	QF; 75+12	QF; 75+10	R32; 56+28	QF; 49+19	QF; 49+15	R64; 32+8	R16; 34+5		2,400	16
11	(United States) Jennifer Capriati	SF; 292+252	SF; 292+250	F 210+143	QF; 162+122	SF; 135+75	SF; 88+36	QF; 75+19	QF; 49+15	QF; 49+10	R16; 42+10	R32; 28+4	R16; 1+0						2,359	12
