= 2004 Porsche Tennis Grand Prix =

- Date: 4–10 October
- Edition: 27th
- Category: Tier II
- Draw: 28S / 16D
- Prize money: $650,000
- Surface: Hard (Greenset) / indoor
- Location: Filderstadt, Germany
- Venue: Filderstadt Tennis Club

Champions

Singles
- (United States) Lindsay Davenport

Doubles
- (Zimbabwe) Cara Black / (Australia) Rennae Stubbs
- Porsche Tennis Grand Prix

The 2004 Porsche Tennis Grand Prix was a women's tennis tournament played on indoor hard courts at the Filderstadt Tennis Club in Filderstadt, Germany that was part of Tier II of the 2004 WTA Tour. It was the 27th edition of the tournament and was held from 4 October until 10 October 2004. Second-seeded Lindsay Davenport won the singles title and earned $98,500 first-prize money.

== Finals ==
=== Singles ===
(United States) Lindsay Davenport defeated (France) Amélie Mauresmo 6–2 ret.

- It was Davenport's 7th singles title of the year and the 45th of her career.

=== Doubles ===
(Zimbabwe) Cara Black / (Australia) Rennae Stubbs defeated (Germany) Anna-Lena Grönefeld / (Germany) Julia Schruff 6–3, 6–2

== Prize money ==
Event	W	F	SF	QF	Round of 16	Round of 32
Singles	$98,500	$53,000	$28,300	$15,150	$8,100	$4,350
