= 2005 Porsche Tennis Grand Prix =

- Date: 3–9 October
- Edition: 28th
- Category: Tier II
- Draw: 28S / 16D
- Prize money: $650,000
- Surface: Hard (Greenset) / indoor
- Location: Filderstadt, Germany
- Venue: Filderstadt Tennis Club

Champions

Singles
- (United States) Lindsay Davenport

Doubles
- (Slovakia) Daniela Hantuchová (Russia) Anastasia Myskina
- Porsche Tennis Grand Prix

The 2005 Porsche Tennis Grand Prix was a women's tennis tournament played on indoor hard courts at the Filderstadt Tennis Club in Filderstadt, Germany that was part of Tier II of the 2005 WTA Tour. It was the 28th edition of the tournament and was held from 3 October until 9 October 2005. First-seeded Lindsay Davenport won the singles title and earned $98,500 first-prize money.

== Finals ==
=== Singles ===
(United States) Lindsay Davenport defeated (France) Amélie Mauresmo 6–2, 6–4

- It was Davenport's 5th singles title of the year and the 50th of her career.

=== Doubles ===
(Slovakia) Daniela Hantuchová / (Russia) Anastasia Myskina defeated (Czech Republic) Květa Peschke / (Italy) Francesca Schiavone 6–0, 3–6, 7–5

== Prize money ==
| Event | W | F | SF | QF | Round of 16 | Round of 32 |
| Singles | $98,500 | $53,000 | $28,300 | $15,150 | $8,100 | $4,350 |
