= 2005 Porsche Tennis Grand Prix – Doubles =

Doubles
- 2005 Porsche Tennis Grand Prix

Final
- Champions: (Slovakia) Daniela Hantuchová (Russia) Anastasia Myskina
- Runners-up: (Czech Republic) Květa Peschke (Italy) Francesca Schiavone
- Score: 6–0, 3–6, 7–5

Details
- Draw: 16 (1WC/1Q)
- Seeds: 4

Events
Singles	Doubles
← 2004 ·	Women's Stuttgart Open	· 2006 →

Cara Black and Rennae Stubbs were the defending champions, but lost in the first round to Elena Dementieva and Flavia Pennetta.

Daniela Hantuchová and Anastasia Myskina won the title by defeating Květa Peschke and Francesca Schiavone 6–0, 3–6, 7–5 in the final.

== Seeds ==
1. (Zimbabwe) Cara Black / (Australia) Rennae Stubbs (first round)
2. (United States) Lisa Raymond / (Australia) Samantha Stosur (first round)
3. (Russia) Elena Likhovtseva / (Australia) Alicia Molik (quarterfinals)
4. (Germany) Anna-Lena Grönefeld / (United States) Meghann Shaughnessy (first round)

== Draw ==
=== Key ===
- Q = Qualifier
- WC = Wild card
- LL = Lucky loser
- Alt = Alternate
- SE = Special exempt
- PR = Protected ranking
- ITF = ITF entry
- JE = Junior exempt
- w/o = Walkover
- r = Retired
- d = Defaulted
- SR = Special ranking

=== Draw ===
First round
1	(Zimbabwe) C Black (Australia) R Stubbs	5	4
(Russia) E Dementieva (Italy) F Pennetta	7	6
(Spain) A Medina Garrigues (Russia) D Safina	6	6
(Greece) E Daniilidou (United States) J Russell	4	2
3	(Russia) E Likhovtseva (Australia) A Molik	7^{7}	6
(Croatia) J Kostanić (Czech Republic) M Paštiková	6^{4}	1
(Slovakia) D Hantuchová (Russia) A Myskina	6	6
Q	(Czech Republic) L Hradecká (Czech Republic) V Uhlířová	2	2
(France) N Dechy (Slovakia) J Husárová	5	5
WC	(Germany) J Schruff (Germany) J Wöhr	7	7
(United States) C Morariu (Switzerland) P Schnyder	6	6
4	(Germany) AL Grönefeld (United States) M Shaughnessy	4	4
(Slovenia) T Križan (Tunisia) S Sfar	6	6
(Czech Republic) E Birnerová (Romania) A Vanc	1	4
(Czech Republic) K Peschke (Italy) F Schiavone	6	2	6
2	(United States) L Raymond (Australia) S Stosur	4	6	4

Quarterfinals
(Russia) E Dementieva (Italy) F Pennetta
(Spain) A Medina Garrigues (Russia) D Safina	w/o
3	(Russia) E Likhovtseva (Australia) A Molik	5	4
(Slovakia) D Hantuchová (Russia) A Myskina	7	6
WC	(Germany) J Schruff (Germany) J Wöhr	7	7^{12}
(United States) C Morariu (Switzerland) P Schnyder	5	6^{10}
(Slovenia) T Križan (Tunisia) S Sfar	4	1
(Czech Republic) K Peschke (Italy) F Schiavone	6	6

Semifinals
(Spain) A Medina Garrigues (Russia) D Safina	4	6^{0}
(Slovakia) D Hantuchová (Russia) A Myskina	6	7^{7}
WC	(Germany) J Schruff (Germany) J Wöhr	6^{3}	2
(Czech Republic) K Peschke (Italy) F Schiavone	7^{7}	6

Final
(Slovakia) D Hantuchová (Russia) A Myskina	6	3	7
(Czech Republic) K Peschke (Italy) F Schiavone	0	6	5
