= 2004 WTA Tour Championships – Doubles =

Doubles
- 2004 WTA Tour Championships

Final
- Champions: (Russia) Nadia Petrova (United States) Meghann Shaughnessy
- Runners-up: (Zimbabwe) Cara Black (Australia) Rennae Stubbs
- Score: 7–5, 6–2

Details
- Draw: 4
- Seeds: 2

Events
Singles	Doubles
← 2003 ·	WTA Tour Championships	· 2005 →

Nadia Petrova and Meghann Shaughnessy defeated Cara Black and Rennae Stubbs in the final, 7–5, 6–2 to win the doubles tennis title at the 2004 WTA Tour Championships.

Virginia Ruano Pascual and Paola Suárez were the defending champions, but were defeated in the semifinals by Black and Stubbs.

== Seeds ==
1. (Spain) Virginia Ruano Pascual / (Argentina) Paola Suárez (semifinals)
2. (Russia) Svetlana Kuznetsova / (Russia) Elena Likhovtseva (semifinals)

== Draw ==
=== Key ===
- Q = Qualifier
- WC = Wild card
- LL = Lucky loser
- Alt = Alternate
- SE = Special exempt
- PR = Protected ranking
- ITF = ITF entry
- JE = Junior exempt
- w/o = Walkover
- r = Retired
- d = Defaulted
- SR = Special ranking

=== Finals ===
Semifinals
1	(Spain) Virginia Ruano Pascual (Argentina) Paola Suárez	6^{9}	4
(Zimbabwe) Cara Black (Australia) Rennae Stubbs	7^{11}	6
(Russia) Nadia Petrova (United States) Meghann Shaughnessy	6	6
2	(Russia) Svetlana Kuznetsova (Russia) Elena Likhovtseva	3	2

Final
(Zimbabwe) Cara Black (Australia) Rennae Stubbs	5	2
(Russia) Nadia Petrova (United States) Meghann Shaughnessy	7	6
