= 2004 WTA Tour Championships – Singles =

Singles
- 2004 WTA Tour Championships

Final
- Champion: (Russia) Maria Sharapova
- Runner-up: (United States) Serena Williams
- Score: 4–6, 6–2, 6–4

Details
- Draw: 8 (RR + elimination)
- Seeds: 8

Events
Singles	Doubles
← 2003 ·	WTA Tour Championships	· 2005 →

Maria Sharapova defeated Serena Williams in the final, 4–6, 6–2, 6–4 to win the singles tennis title at the 2004 WTA Tour Championships. This was also the second and final time in which Sharapova defeated Williams, as she would lose their next 19 encounters.

Kim Clijsters was the two-time reigning champion, but did not qualify this year due to a long-term wrist injury.

Sharapova, Svetlana Kuznetsova and Vera Zvonareva made their debuts at the event.

== Seeds ==
1. (United States) Lindsay Davenport (round robin)
2. (France) Amélie Mauresmo (semifinals)
3. (Russia) Anastasia Myskina (semifinals)
4. (Russia) Svetlana Kuznetsova (round robin)
5. (Russia) Elena Dementieva (round robin)
6. (Russia) Maria Sharapova (champion)
7. (United States) Serena Williams (final)
8. (Russia) Vera Zvonareva (round robin)

Note:

- (Belgium) Justine Henin-Hardenne had qualified but pulled out due to cytomegalovirus.

== Alternates ==
1. (United States) Venus Williams (Not used)
2. (United States) Jennifer Capriati (Not used)

== Draw ==
=== Key ===
- Q = Qualifier
- WC = Wild card
- LL = Lucky loser
- Alt = Alternate
- SE = Special exempt
- PR = Protected ranking
- ITF = ITF entry
- JE = Junior exempt
- w/o = Walkover
- r = Retired
- d = Defaulted
- SR = Special ranking

=== Finals ===
Semifinals
3	(Russia) Anastasia Myskina	6	2	2
6	(Russia) Maria Sharapova	2	6	6
2	(France) Amélie Mauresmo	6	6^{2}	4
7	(United States) Serena Williams	4	7^{7}	6

Final
6	(Russia) Maria Sharapova	4	6	6
7	(United States) Serena Williams	6	2	4

=== Black Group ===
		(France) Mauresmo	(Russia) Kuznetsova	(Russia) Sharapova	(Russia) Zvonareva	RR; W–L	Set; W–L	Game; W–L	Standings
2	(France) Amélie Mauresmo		6–3, 6–2	7–5, 6–4	6–0, 6–1	3–0	6–0		1
4	(Russia) Svetlana Kuznetsova	3–6, 2–6		1–6, 4–6	6–2, 6–4	1–2	2–4		3
6	(Russia) Maria Sharapova	5–7, 4–6	6–1, 6–4		6–4, 7–5	2–1	4–2		2
8	(Russia) Vera Zvonareva	0–6, 1–6	2–6, 4–6	4–6, 5–7		0–3	0–6		4

Standings are determined by: 1. number of wins; 2. number of matches; 3. in two-players-ties, head-to-head records; 4. in three-players-ties, percentage of sets won, or of games won; 5. steering-committee decision.

=== Red Group ===
		(United States) Davenport	(Russia) Myskina	(Russia) Dementieva	(United States) Williams	RR; W–L	Set; W–L	Game; W–L	Standings
1	(United States) Lindsay Davenport		6–7^{(5–7)}, 4–6	6–0, 6–1	3–6, 7–5, 6–1	2–1	4–3		3
3	(Russia) Anastasia Myskina	7–6^{(7–5)}, 6–4		6–3, 6–3	6–4, 3–6, 4–6	2–1	5–2		1
5	(Russia) Elena Dementieva	0–6, 1–6	3–6, 3–6		6–7^{(3–7)}, 5–7	0–3	0–6		4
7	(United States) Serena Williams	6–3, 5–7, 1–6	4–6, 6–3, 6–4	7–6^{(7–3)}, 7–5		2–1	5–3		2

Standings are determined by: 1. number of wins; 2. number of matches; 3. in two-players-ties, head-to-head records; 4. in three-players-ties, percentage of sets won, or of games won; 5. steering-committee decision.

== See also ==
- WTA Tour Championships appearances
