= 2004 Porsche Tennis Grand Prix – Doubles =

Doubles
- 2004 Porsche Tennis Grand Prix

Final
- Champions: (Zimbabwe) Cara Black (Australia) Rennae Stubbs
- Runners-up: (Germany) Anna-Lena Grönefeld (Germany) Julia Schruff
- Score: 6–3, 6–2

Events
Singles	Doubles
← 2003 ·	Women's Stuttgart Open	· 2005 →

Lisa Raymond and Rennae Stubbs were the defending champions, but competed this year with different partners. Both players faced each other at the first round, in which Stubbs (teaming up with Cara Black) defeated Raymond (teaming up with Mary Pierce) in three sets.

Stubbs and Black will eventually win the title, by defeating Anna-Lena Grönefeld and Julia Schruff 6–3, 6–2 in the final.

== Seeds ==
1. (Zimbabwe) Cara Black / (Australia) Rennae Stubbs (champions)
2. (Slovakia) Janette Husárová / (Russia) Elena Likhovtseva (semifinals)
3. (Australia) Alicia Molik / (Japan) Ai Sugiyama (quarterfinals, withdrew due to a right thigh strain on Molik)
4. (Russia) Anastasia Myskina / (Russia) Vera Zvonareva (quarterfinals)

== Draw ==
=== Key ===
- Q = Qualifier
- WC = Wild card
- LL = Lucky loser
- Alt = Alternate
- SE = Special exempt
- PR = Protected ranking
- ITF = ITF entry
- JE = Junior exempt
- w/o = Walkover
- r = Retired
- d = Defaulted
- SR = Special ranking

=== Draw ===
First round
1	(Zimbabwe) C Black (Australia) R Stubbs	2	6	7
(France) M Pierce (United States) L Raymond	6	4	5
(United States) L Davenport (United States) C Morariu	7^{8}	6
(Czech Republic) I Benešová (Luxembourg) C Schaul	6^{6}	4
3	(Australia) A Molik (Japan) A Sugiyama	6	7
(Italy) S Farina Elia (Italy) F Schiavone	2	5
(Ukraine) T Perebiynis (Spain) M Serna	4	4
(France) C Dhenin (Germany) M Weingärtner	6	6
WC	(Germany) AL Grönefeld (Germany) J Schruff	6	6
(Austria) B Schett (Switzerland) P Schnyder	2	2
WC	(Slovakia) D Hantuchová (Spain) A Sánchez Vicario	3	5
4	(Russia) A Myskina (Russia) V Zvonareva	6	7
Q	(Czech Republic) E Birnerová (United States) L Osterloh	2	7	7^{7}
(Croatia) J Kostanić (Australia) L McShea	6	5	6^{1}
(Belgium) E Callens (Sweden) Å Svensson	6	1	4
2	(Slovakia) J Husárová (Russia) E Likhovtseva	1	6	6

Quarterfinals
1	(Zimbabwe) C Black (Australia) R Stubbs	6	6
(United States) L Davenport (United States) C Morariu	2	4
3	(Australia) A Molik (Japan) A Sugiyama
(France) C Dhenin (Germany) M Weingärtner	w/o
WC	(Germany) AL Grönefeld (Germany) J Schruff	6	6
4	(Russia) A Myskina (Russia) V Zvonareva	4	4
Q	(Czech Republic) E Birnerová (United States) L Osterloh	4	1
2	(Slovakia) J Husárová (Russia) E Likhovtseva	6	6

Semifinals
1	(Zimbabwe) C Black (Australia) R Stubbs	6	6
(France) C Dhenin (Germany) M Weingärtner	0	4
WC	(Germany) AL Grönefeld (Germany) J Schruff	6	6
2	(Slovakia) J Husárová (Russia) E Likhovtseva	1	2

Final
1	(Zimbabwe) C Black (Australia) R Stubbs	6	6
WC	(Germany) AL Grönefeld (Germany) J Schruff	3	2
