= 2005 Porsche Tennis Grand Prix – Singles =

Singles
- 2005 Porsche Tennis Grand Prix

Final
- Champion: (United States) Lindsay Davenport
- Runner-up: (France) Amélie Mauresmo
- Score: 6–2, 6–4

Details
- Draw: 28 (3WC/4Q)
- Seeds: 8

Events
| Singles | Doubles |
- Women's Stuttgart Open

Defending champion Lindsay Davenport defeated Amélie Mauresmo in a rematch of the previous year's final, 6–2, 6–4 to win the singles tennis title at the 2005 Stuttgart Open.

== Seeds ==
The first four seeds received a bye into the second round.

1. (United States) Lindsay Davenport (champion)
2. (Belgium) Kim Clijsters (quarterfinals)
3. (France) Amélie Mauresmo (final)
4. (Belgium) Justine Henin-Hardenne (second round)
5. (Russia) Elena Dementieva (semifinals)
6. (Russia) Nadia Petrova (quarterfinals)
7. (Switzerland) Patty Schnyder (second round)
8. (Russia) Anastasia Myskina (quarterfinals)

== Draw ==
Key

- Q = Qualifier
- WC = Wild card
- LL = Lucky loser
- Alt = Alternate
- ITF = ITF entry
- PR = Protected ranking
- SR = Special ranking
- SE = Special exempt
- JE = Junior exempt
- JR = Junior Accelerator Programme entrant
- CO = College Accelerator Programme entrant
- NG = Next Gen Accelerator Program entrant
- w/o = Walkover
- r = Retired
- d = Defaulted

=== Finals ===
Semifinals
1 | (United States) Lindsay Davenport | 6 | 6
(Slovakia) Daniela Hantuchová | 4 | 3
3 | (France) Amélie Mauresmo | 6 | 6
5 | (Russia) Elena Dementieva | 3 | 4

Final
1 | (United States) Lindsay Davenport | 6 | 6
3 | (France) Amélie Mauresmo | 2 | 4

=== Top half ===
First round
(Italy) F Schiavone | 6 | 6
(Russia) A Chakvetadze | 3 | 3
(Russia) D Safina | 6 | 6
WC | (Germany) S Klösel | 2 | 2
Q | (Germany) S Gehrlein | 1 | 4
8 | (Russia) A Myskina | 6 | 6
(Italy) F Pennetta | 7 | 6
WC | (Germany) J Schruff | 5 | 2
WC | (United States) M Shaughnessy | 4 | 0
(Slovakia) D Hantuchová | 6 | 6
(Serbia and Montenegro) A Ivanovic | 1 | 2
7 | (Switzerland) P Schnyder | 6 | 6

Second round
1 | (United States) L Davenport | 6 | 6
(Italy) F Schiavone | 2 | 2
(Russia) D Safina | 6^{6} | 7^{7} | 5
8 | (Russia) A Myskina | 7^{8} | 6^{3} | 7
4 | (Belgium) J Henin-Hardenne | 4 | 3
(Italy) F Pennetta | 6 | 6
(Slovakia) D Hantuchová | 6 | 6
7 | (Switzerland) P Schnyder | 4 | 3

Quarterfinals
1 | (United States) L Davenport | 6 | 3 | 6
8 | (Russia) A Myskina | 2 | 6 | 1
(Italy) F Pennetta | 3 | 4
(Slovakia) D Hantuchová | 6 | 6

Semifinals
1 | (United States) L Davenport | 6 | 6
(Slovakia) D Hantuchová | 4 | 3

=== Bottom half ===
First round
6 | (Russia) N Petrova | 6 | 6
(Germany) AL Grönefeld | 3 | 2
(Russia) E Likhovtseva | 4 | 7 | 6
(Italy) S Farina Elia | 6 | 5 | 3
(Spain) A Medina Garrigues | 2 | 2
(Serbia and Montenegro) J Janković | 6 | 6
5 | (Russia) E Dementieva | 6 | 6
Q | (Czech Republic) Z Ondrášková | 2 | 4
(France) N Dechy | 6 | 6
(Australia) A Molik | 3 | 3
Q | (Greece) E Daniilidou | 3 | 6 | 5
Q | (Croatia) K Šprem | 6 | 3 | 7

Second round
6 | (Russia) N Petrova | 6 | 6
(Russia) E Likhovtseva | 1 | 1
(Serbia and Montenegro) J Janković | 0 | r
3 | (France) A Mauresmo | 6
5 | (Russia) E Dementieva | 5 | 6 | 6
(France) N Dechy | 7 | 3 | 4
Q | (Croatia) K Šprem | 3 | 2
2 | (Belgium) K Clijsters | 6 | 6

Quarterfinals
6 | (Russia) N Petrova | 6 | 2 | 4
3 | (France) A Mauresmo | 2 | 6 | 6
5 | (Russia) E Dementieva | 6 | 3 | 6
2 | (Belgium) K Clijsters | 3 | 6 | 2

Semifinals
3 | (France) A Mauresmo | 6 | 6
5 | (Russia) E Dementieva | 3 | 4
