= 2004 Porsche Tennis Grand Prix – Singles =

Women's tennis tournament

Singles
- 2004 Porsche Tennis Grand Prix

Final
- Champion: (United States) Lindsay Davenport
- Runner-up: (France) Amélie Mauresmo
- Score: 6–2, retired

Events
Singles	Doubles
← 2003 ·	Women's Stuttgart Open	· 2005 →

Lindsay Davenport won the singles tennis title at the 2004 Stuttgart Open after World No. 1 Amélie Mauresmo retired due to injury, with the scoreline at 6–2, ret.

Kim Clijsters was the two-time reigning champion, but did not compete this year due to a left wrist injury.

== Seeds ==
The top four seeds received a bye into the second round.

1. (France) Amélie Mauresmo (final, retired due to a left adductor strain)
2. (United States) Lindsay Davenport (champion)
3. (Russia) Anastasia Myskina (semifinals)
4. (Russia) Svetlana Kuznetsova (semifinals)
5. (Russia) Elena Dementieva (first round)
6. (Russia) Vera Zvonareva (first round)
7. (Russia) Nadia Petrova (first round)
8. (Japan) Ai Sugiyama (first round)

== Draw ==
=== Key ===
- Q = Qualifier
- WC = Wild card
- LL = Lucky loser
- Alt = Alternate
- SE = Special exempt
- PR = Protected ranking
- ITF = ITF entry
- JE = Junior exempt
- w/o = Walkover
- r = Retired
- d = Defaulted
- SR = Special ranking

=== Finals ===
Semifinals
1	(France) Amélie Mauresmo	7	6
4	(Russia) Svetlana Kuznetsova	5	4
3	(Russia) Anastasia Myskina	2	4
2	(United States) Lindsay Davenport	6	6

Final
1	(France) Amélie Mauresmo	2	0^{r}
2	(United States) Lindsay Davenport	6	0

=== Top half ===
First round
(Switzerland) P Schnyder	6	5	6
Q	(Croatia) J Kostanić	3	7	1
(Croatia) K Šprem	6	3	3
(Italy) S Farina Elia	3	6	6
LL	(United States) L Raymond	6	7
5	(Russia) E Dementieva	0	5
(Russia) E Bovina	6	6
WC	(Germany) AL Grönefeld	2	2
Q	(Colombia) F Zuluaga	6	6
WC	(Germany) M Weingärtner	0	0
(Israel) A Smashnova	6	7^{7}
8	(Japan) A Sugiyama	3	6^{3}

Second round
1	(France) A Mauresmo	7	6
(Switzerland) P Schnyder	5	4
(Italy) S Farina Elia	7^{7}	6^{6}	0
LL	(United States) L Raymond	6^{3}	7^{8}	6
4	(Russia) S Kuznetsova	7	6
(Russia) E Bovina	5	4
Q	(Colombia) F Zuluaga	6	1
(Israel) A Smashnova	4	0^{r}

Quarterfinals
1	(France) A Mauresmo	6	6
LL	(United States) L Raymond	4	1
4	(Russia) S Kuznetsova	6	6
Q	(Colombia) F Zuluaga	4	1

Semifinals
1	(France) A Mauresmo	7	6
4	(Russia) S Kuznetsova	5	4

=== Bottom half ===
First round
6	(Russia) V Zvonareva	3	5
(Russia) E Likhovtseva	6	7
(France) M Pierce	6	6
(Argentina) P Suárez	2	3
(Bulgaria) M Maleeva	6	3	3
WC	(France) N Dechy	4	6	6
7	(Russia) N Petrova	4	6	6^{3}
Q	(Serbia and Montenegro) J Janković	6	3	7^{7}
Q	(United States) L Osterloh	6	2	1
(Slovakia) D Hantuchová	3	6	6
(Australia) A Molik	6	6
(Italy) F Schiavone	2	3

Second round
(Russia) E Likhovtseva	0	6	6
(France) M Pierce	6	4	3
WC	(France) N Dechy	6	2	1
3	(Russia) A Myskina	4	6	6
Q	(Serbia and Montenegro) J Janković	6	6
(Slovakia) D Hantuchová	1	4
(Australia) A Molik	1	0
2	(United States) L Davenport	6	6

Quarterfinals
(Russia) E Likhovtseva	6	0	2
3	(Russia) A Myskina	4	6	6
Q	(Serbia and Montenegro) J Janković	3	4
2	(United States) L Davenport	6	6

Semifinals
3	(Russia) A Myskina	2	4
2	(United States) L Davenport	6	6
