= 2004 Rogers AT&T Cup – Singles =

Women's tennis tournament

Singles
- 2004 Rogers AT&T Cup

Final
- Champion: (France) Amélie Mauresmo
- Runner-up: (Russia) Elena Likhovtseva
- Score: 6–1, 6–0

Details
- Draw: 56
- Seeds: 16

Events
Singles	Doubles
- Rogers AT&T Cup

Amélie Mauresmo defeated Elena Likhovtseva in the final, 6–1, 6–0 to win the women's singles tennis title at the 2004 Canadian Open.

Justine Henin-Hardenne was the reigning champion, but chose not to participate that year.

== Seeds ==
The top eight seeds received a bye into the second round.

1. (United States) Serena Williams (withdrew due to a left knee inflammation)
2. (France) Amélie Mauresmo (champion)
3. (Russia) Anastasia Myskina (semifinals)
4. (Russia) Elena Dementieva (second round)
5. (United States) Jennifer Capriati (quarterfinals)
6. (Russia) Maria Sharapova (third round)
7. (Japan) Ai Sugiyama (third round)
8. (Russia) Nadia Petrova (second round)
9. (Argentina) Paola Suárez (third round)
10. (Russia) Vera Zvonareva (semifinals)
11. (Italy) Francesca Schiavone (third round)
12. (Croatia) Karolina Šprem (quarterfinals)
13. (Bulgaria) Magdalena Maleeva (quarterfinals)
14. (Russia) Elena Bovina (third round)
15. (United States) Chanda Rubin (third round)
16. (Colombia) Fabiola Zuluaga (second round)
17. (France) Mary Pierce (third round)

== Draw ==
Key

- Q = Qualifier
- WC = Wild card
- LL = Lucky loser
- Alt = Alternate
- ITF = ITF entry
- PR = Protected ranking
- SR = Special ranking
- SE = Special exempt
- JE = Junior exempt
- JR = Junior Accelerator Programme entrant
- CO = College Accelerator Programme entrant
- NG = Next Gen Accelerator Program entrant
- w/o = Walkover
- r = Retired
- d = Defaulted

=== Finals ===
Quarterfinals
3	(Russia) Anastasia Myskina	7	6
13	(Bulgaria) Magdalena Maleeva	5	1
5	(United States) Jennifer Capriati	2	5
(Russia) Elena Likhovtseva	6	7
10	(Russia) Vera Zvonareva	6	6
(France) Tatiana Golovin	3	1
12	(Croatia) Karolina Šprem	6	2	4
2	(France) Amélie Mauresmo	3	6	6

Semifinals
3	(Russia) Anastasia Myskina	3	7	4
(Russia) Elena Likhovtseva	6	5	6
10	(Russia) Vera Zvonareva	6^{6}	2
2	(France) Amélie Mauresmo	7	6

Final
(Russia) Elena Likhovtseva	1	0
2	(France) Amélie Mauresmo	6	6

=== Top half ===
==== Section 1 ====
First round
(Spain) A Parra Santonja	4	7	6
Q	(Luxembourg) A Kremer	6	6^{2}	4
(Czech Republic) B Strýcová	6^{3}	4
Q	(United States) M Washington	7	6
Q	(Germany) A Matic	4	3
15	(United States) C Rubin	6	6
13	(Bulgaria) M Maleeva	7	3	6
(Russia) L Krasnoroutskaya	6^{4}	6	4
(Slovakia) M Suchá	7	4	6
Q	(Paraguay) R Neffa-de los Ríos	6^{3}	6	2
(Japan) S Obata	6^{3}	4
(Serbia and Montenegro) J Janković	7	6

Second round
3	(Russia) A Myskina	6	6
(Spain) A Parra Santonja	0	4
Q	(United States) M Washington	4	3
15	(United States) C Rubin	6	6
13	(Bulgaria) M Maleeva	6	6^{4}	6
(Slovakia) M Suchá	3	7	4
(Serbia and Montenegro) J Janković	3	2
9	(Argentina) P Suárez	6	6

Third round
3	(Russia) A Myskina	6	6
15	(United States) C Rubin	4	0
13	(Bulgaria) M Maleeva	6	6
9	(Argentina) P Suárez	4	3

Quarterfinals
3	(Russia) A Myskina	7	6
13	(Bulgaria) M Maleeva	5	1

==== Section 2 ====
First round
(Russia) A Jidkova	6	6
Q	(United States) T Ashley	1	2
(Australia) N Pratt	6	6
(United States) S Perry	4	4
(Germany) M Weingärtner	1	1
17	(France) M Pierce	6	6
11	(Italy) F Schiavone	6	7
WC	(Canada) M-È Pelletier	3	5
(France) N Dechy	6	6
(United States) L Granville	3	2
(Russia) E Likhovtseva	0	6	6
(Venezuela) M Vento-Kabchi	6	3	2

Second round
5	(United States) J Capriati	7	7
(Russia) A Jidkova	6^{3}	5
(Australia) N Pratt	1	1
17	(France) M Pierce	6	6
11	(Italy) F Schiavone	7	6
(France) N Dechy	6^{4}	4
(Russia) E Likhovtseva	6	6^{6}	7
8	(Russia) N Petrova	4	7	5

Third round
5	(United States) J Capriati	6	6
17	(France) M Pierce	2	4
11	(Italy) F Schiavone	2	3
(Russia) E Likhovtseva	6	6

Quarterfinals
5	(United States) J Capriati	2	5
(Russia) E Likhovtseva	6	7

=== Bottom half ===
==== Section 3 ====
First round
(Puerto Rico) K Brandi	3	6	6
LL	(Italy) R Grande	6	3	0
Q	(Indonesia) A Widjaja	7	3	4
Q	(United States) B Mattek	6^{2}	6	6
(Japan) A Morigami	1	3
10	(Russia) V Zvonareva	6	6
16	(Colombia) F Zuluaga	6	6
(Spain) M Sánchez Lorenzo	1	4
(Germany) A Barna	2	1
(France) T Golovin	6	6
(Argentina) G Dulko	6	7
LL	(United States) L Lee-Waters	3	5

Second round
6	(Russia) M Sharapova	6	6
(Puerto Rico) K Brandi	1	4
Q	(United States) B Mattek	2	6^{5}
10	(Russia) V Zvonareva	6	7
16	(Colombia) F Zuluaga	3	6	2
(France) T Golovin	6	4	6
(Argentina) G Dulko	6	6
4	(Russia) E Dementieva	1	4

Third round
6	(Russia) M Sharapova	6	4	4
10	(Russia) V Zvonareva	4	6	6
(France) T Golovin	6^{0}	6	6
(Argentina) G Dulko	7	3	4

Quarterfinals
10	(Russia) V Zvonareva	6	6
(France) T Golovin	3	1

==== Section 4 ====
First round
(Slovakia) D Hantuchová	5
(France) É Loit	3	r
(Japan) S Asagoe	6	6
WC	(Canada) A Wozniak	3	2
WC	(Canada) M Drake	2	1
12	(Croatia) K Šprem	6	6
14	(Russia) E Bovina	6	6
(Spain) V Ruano Pascual	1	3
Q	(United States) L Osterloh	0	6	6
(United States) J Craybas	6	1	3
(Spain) M Marrero	3	3
(Thailand) T Tanasurgarn	6	6

Second round
7	(Japan) A Sugiyama	1	6	6
(Slovakia) D Hantuchová	6	4	4
(Japan) S Asagoe	2	6	1
12	(Croatia) K Šprem	6	4	6
14	(Russia) E Bovina	7	6
Q	(United States) L Osterloh	6^{7}	4
(Thailand) T Tanasurgarn	4	6	2
2	(France) A Mauresmo	6	1	6

Third round
7	(Japan) A Sugiyama	3	4
12	(Croatia) K Šprem	6	6
14	(Russia) E Bovina	3	6	2
2	(France) A Mauresmo	6	3	6

Quarterfinals
12	(Croatia) K Šprem	6	2	4
2	(France) A Mauresmo	3	6	6
