= 2004 Pacific Life Open – Women's singles =

Women's singles
- 2004 Pacific Life Open

Final
- Champion: (Belgium) Justine Henin-Hardenne
- Runner-up: (United States) Lindsay Davenport
- Score: 6–1, 6–4

Details
- Draw: 96 (9WC/12Q/2LL)
- Seeds: 33

Events
Singles	men	women
Doubles	men	women
← 2003 ·	Indian Wells Masters	· 2005 →

Justine Henin-Hardenne defeated Lindsay Davenport in the final, 6–1, 6–4 to win the women's singles tennis title at the 2004 Indian Wells Masters.

Kim Clijsters was the defending champion, but withdrew before her third round match against Laura Granville due to a wrist injury that would ultimately sideline her for the remainder of the season.

== Seeds ==
All seeded players received a bye for the first round.

1. (Belgium) Justine Henin-Hardenne (champion)
2. (Belgium) Kim Clijsters (third round, withdrew)
3. (United States) Lindsay Davenport (final)
4. (Russia) Anastasia Myskina (semifinals)
5. (United States) Chanda Rubin (withdrew)
6. (Russia) Vera Zvonareva (fourth round)
7. (Russia) Nadia Petrova (third round)
8. (Argentina) Paola Suárez (third round)
9. (Serbia and Montenegro) Jelena Dokić (second round)
10. (Israel) Anna Smashnova-Pistolesi (third round)
11. (Spain) Conchita Martínez (quarterfinals)
12. (Russia) Svetlana Kuznetsova (quarterfinals)
13. (Bulgaria) Magdalena Maleeva (second round)
14. (Italy) Francesca Schiavone (second round)
15. (Colombia) Fabiola Zuluaga (quarterfinals)
16. (Russia) Maria Sharapova (fourth round)
17. (Spain) Magüi Serna (second round)
18. (United States) Lisa Raymond (third round)
19. (France) Nathalie Dechy (semifinals)
20. (United States) Meghann Shaughnessy (fourth round)
21. (Slovenia) Tina Pisnik (second round)
22. (Australia) Alicia Molik (third round)
23. (Greece) Eleni Daniilidou (second round)
24. (Slovakia) Daniela Hantuchová (second round)
25. (Spain) María Sánchez Lorenzo (second round)
26. (Croatia) Karolina Šprem (second round)
27. (Hungary) Petra Mandula (second round)
28. (Japan) Saori Obata (second round)
29. (Russia) Elena Likhovtseva (second round)
30. (France) Émilie Loit (second round)
31. (Venezuela) María Vento-Kabchi (third round)
32. (Zimbabwe) Cara Black (second round)
33. (United States) Amy Frazier (fourth round)

== Draw ==
=== Key ===
- Q = Qualifier
- WC = Wild card
- LL = Lucky loser
- Alt = Alternate
- ITF = ITF entry
- PR = Protected ranking
- SR = Special ranking
- SE = Special exempt
- JE = Junior exempt
- JR = Junior Accelerator Programme entrant
- CO = College Accelerator Programme entrant
- NG = Next Gen Accelerator Program entrant
- w/o = Walkover
- r = Retired
- d = Defaulted

=== Finals ===
Quarterfinals
1	(Belgium) Justine Henin-Hardenne	6	7
12	(Russia) Svetlana Kuznetsova	4	5
4	(Russia) Anastasia Myskina	7	2	6
11	(Spain) Conchita Martínez	6^{2}	6	3
Q	(Argentina) Gisela Dulko	3	2
3	(United States) Lindsay Davenport	6	6
19	(France) Nathalie Dechy	7	6
15	(Colombia) Fabiola Zuluaga	6^{1}	3

Semifinals
1	(Belgium) Justine Henin-Hardenne	6	6
4	(Russia) Anastasia Myskina	1	1
3	(United States) Lindsay Davenport	6	7
19	(France) Nathalie Dechy	2	6^{4}

Final
1	(Belgium) Justine Henin-Hardenne	6	6
3	(United States) Lindsay Davenport	1	4

=== Top half ===
==== Section 1 ====
First round
(United States) S Reeves	4	6	6
WC	(Ukraine) V Kutuzova	6	3	4
(Spain) A Parra	0	6^{8}
Q	(Spain) M Marrero	6	7
WC	(United States) A Haynes	2	4
Q	(Czech Republic) B Strýcová	6	6
(Switzerland) E Gagliardi	3	6	0
LL	(Czech Republic) I Benešová	6	2	6

Second round
1	(Belgium) J Henin-Hardenne	6	6
(United States) S Reeves	2	2
(Spain) M Marrero	7	6
32	(Zimbabwe) C Black	6^{6}	1
23	(Greece) E Daniilidou	6	4	1
Q	(Czech Republic) B Strýcová	3	6	6
LL	(Czech Republic) I Benešová	7	6
13	(Bulgaria) M Maleeva	5	4

Third round
1	(Belgium) J Henin-Hardenne	6	6
(Spain) M Marrero	1	2
Q	(Czech Republic) B Strýcová	6	2
LL	(Czech Republic) I Benešová	1	1	r

Fourth round
1	(Belgium) J Henin-Hardenne	6	6
Q	(Czech Republic) B Strýcová	3	4

==== Section 2 ====
First round
Q	(Russia) A Jidkova	6	6
LL	(Czech Republic) E Birnerová	2	3
(Hungary) M Czink	2	2
WC	(Croatia) I Majoli	6	6
(France) M Bartoli	0	5
(Slovakia) M Suchá	6	7
(Italy) R Grande	4	1
Q	(Italy) A Serra Zanetti	6	6

Second round
12	(Russia) S Kuznetsova	4	6	6
Q	(Russia) A Jidkova	6	4	1
WC	(Croatia) I Majoli	3	4
22	(Australia) A Molik	6	6
30	(France) É Loit	6	5	5
(Slovakia) M Suchá	4	7	7
Q	(Italy) A Serra Zanetti	5	3
33	(United States) A Frazier	7	6

Third round
12	(Russia) S Kuznetsova	3	7	6
(Australia) A Molik	6	6^{6}	2
(Slovakia) M Suchá	2	1
33	(United States) A Frazier	6	6

Fourth round
12	(Russia) S Kuznetsova	6	6
33	(United States) A Frazier	0	3

==== Section 3 ====
First round
(France) S Cohen-Aloro	6	2	1
(Italy) ME Camerin	1	6	6
(Argentina) M Díaz Oliva	2	6	7
(Japan) A Morigami	6	3	6^{2}
(United States) A Stevenson	2	6	1
WC	(Bulgaria) S Karatantcheva	6	2	6
(Slovakia) Ľ Cervanová	4	3
(Italy) F Pennetta	6	6

Second round
4	(Russia) A Myskina	6	6
(Italy) ME Camerin	3	2
(Argentina) M Díaz Oliva	3	5
31	(Venezuela) M Vento-Kabchi	6	7
17	(Spain) M Serna	4	6	5
WC	(Bulgaria) S Karatantcheva	6	2	7
(Italy) F Pennetta	3	6	4
16	(Russia) M Sharapova	6	4	6

Third round
4	(Russia) A Myskina	2	6	6
31	(Venezuela) M Vento-Kabchi	6	4	5
WC	(Bulgaria) S Karatantcheva	6	3	2
16	(Russia) M Sharapova	3	6	6

Fourth round
4	(Russia) A Myskina	6	6
16	(Russia) M Sharapova	2	1

==== Section 4 ====
First round
(United States) J Craybas	6	3	6
(Belgium) E Callens	1	6	2
WC	(Russia) M Kirilenko	1	4
(Slovakia) Ľ Kurhajcová	6	6
(Ukraine) T Perebiynis	7	1	2
(Austria) B Schett	6^{7}	6	6
WC	(France) T Golovin	6	4	6
(Japan) S Asagoe	1	6	3

Second round
11	(Spain) C Martínez	6	6
(United States) J Craybas	0	3
(Slovakia) Ľ Kurhajcová	6	1	3
18	(United States) L Raymond	4	6	6
29	(Russia) E Likhovtseva	6	5	3
(Austria) B Schett	4	7	6
WC	(France) T Golovin	6	5	2
8	(Argentina) P Suárez	1	7	6

Third round
11	(Spain) C Martínez	6	7
(United States) L Raymond	4	5
(Austria) B Schett	6	6
8	(Argentina) P Suárez	3	4

Fourth round
11	(Spain) C Martínez	6	6
(Austria) B Schett	1	2

=== Bottom half ===
==== Section 5 ====
First round
Q	(Germany) A-L Grönefeld	7	6
(Spain) V Ruano Pascual	5	2
Q	(Argentina) G Dulko	7	6
(Czech Republic) K Koukalová	6^{5}	1
WC	(United States) J Jackson	6	6^{4}	0^{r}
Q	(United States) M Irvin	2	7	1
(Spain) G León García	2	6	7
(Russia) T Panova	6	4	6^{4}

Second round
7	(Russia) N Petrova	7	6
(Germany) A-L Grönefeld	5	3
Q	(Argentina) G Dulko	0	7	6
25	(Spain) M Sánchez Lorenzo	6	6^{1}	1
24	(Slovakia) D Hantuchová	4	7	6^{3}
Q	(United States) M Irvin	6	6^{5}	7
(Spain) G León García	6	3	6
9	(Serbia and Montenegro) J Dokić	4	6	4

Third round
7	(Russia) N Petrova	3	3
Q	(Argentina) G Dulko	6	6
Q	(United States) M Irvin	6	6
(Spain) G León García	1	3

Fourth round
Q	(Argentina) G Dulko	7	7
Q	(United States) M Irvin	6^{3}	6^{2}

==== Section 6 ====
First round
(Czech Republic) D Chládková	2	0
(Puerto Rico) K Brandi	6	6
(Madagascar) D Randriantefy	4	6	5
(Spain) A Medina Garrigues	6	2	7
(Czech Republic) S Kleinová	3	6	3
Q	(Australia) S Stosur	6	2	6
(Italy) T Garbin	6	3	4
(Italy) M Santangelo	1	6	6

Second round
14	(Italy) F Schiavone	2	1
(Puerto Rico) K Brandi	6	6
(Spain) A Medina Garrigues	1	2
20	(United States) M Shaughnessy	6	6
26	(Croatia) K Šprem	4	4
Q	(Australia) S Stosur	6	6
(Italy) M Santangelo	0	0
3	(United States) L Davenport	6	6

Third round
(Puerto Rico) K Brandi	4	4
20	(United States) M Shaughnessy	6	6
Q	(Australia) S Stosur	0	3
3	(United States) L Davenport	6	6

Fourth round
20	(United States) M Shaughnessy	1	3
3	(United States) L Davenport	6	6

==== Section 7 ====
First round
(Czech Republic) Z Ondrášková	4	6	5
(Switzerland) M-G Mikaelian	6	3	7
(Luxembourg) C Schaul	7	6
(Serbia and Montenegro) J Janković	6^{9}	4
Q	(United States) S Perry	6	6
(Ukraine) J Vakulenko	3	2
WC	(Russia) A Kleybanova	2	6	7
(Croatia) J Kostanić	6	0	5

Second round
6	(Russia) V Zvonareva	6	6
(Switzerland) M-G Mikaelian	1	4
(Luxembourg) C Schaul	6	6
28	(Japan) S Obata	1	2
19	(France) N Dechy	6	6
Q	(United States) S Perry	3	4
WC	(Russia) A Kleybanova	4	0
10	(Israel) A Smashnova-Pistolesi	6	6

Third round
6	(Russia) V Zvonareva	6	6
(Luxembourg) C Schaul	2	0
19	(France) N Dechy	7	6
10	(Israel) A Smashnova-Pistolesi	5	4

Fourth round
6	(Russia) V Zvonareva	6	2	2
19	(France) N Dechy	2	6	6

==== Section 8 ====
First round
(Hungary) A Kapros	6	6
(Slovakia) H Nagyová	1	2
Q	(Croatia) S Talaja	5	6	6
(Luxembourg) A Kremer	7	3	1
(United States) L Granville	4	6	6
(Thailand) T Tanasugarn	6	3	4
Q	(Germany) A Rösch	7	6
Q	(Austria) S Bammer	5	3

Second round
15	(Colombia) F Zuluaga	6	6
(Hungary) A Kapros	3	4
Q	(Croatia) S Talaja	6	6
21	(Slovenia) T Pisnik	1	0
27	(Hungary) P Mandula	3	4
(United States) L Granville	6	6
Q	(Germany) A Rösch	1	3
2	(Belgium) K Clijsters	6	6

Third round
15	(Colombia) F Zuluaga	6	2
Q	(Croatia) S Talaja	4	0	r
(United States) L Granville	w/o
2	(Belgium) K Clijsters

Fourth round
15	(Colombia) F Zuluaga	7	6
(United States) L Granville	5	2

== Qualifying ==
=== Seeds ===
1. (Argentina) Gisela Dulko (qualified)
2. (Japan) ~~Ai Sugiyama~~ (moved to Main Draw but withdrew)
3. (Croatia) Silvija Talaja (qualified)
4. (Czech Republic) Iveta Benešová (qualifying competition, Lucky loser)
5. (Czech Republic) Eva Birnerová (qualifying competition, Lucky loser)
6. (Bosnia and Herzegovina) Mervana Jugić-Salkić (first round)
7. (Russia) Alina Jidkova (qualified)
8. (Spain) Conchita Martínez Granados (qualifying competition)
9. (Germany) Anna-Lena Grönefeld (qualified)
10. (Spain) Marta Marrero (qualified)
11. (United States) Tara Snyder (first round)
12. (Italy) Antonella Serra Zanetti (qualified)
13. (Madagascar) ~~Dally Randriantefy~~ (moved to Main Draw)
14. (Germany) Julia Schruff (qualifying competition)
15. (Czech Republic) Barbora Strýcová (qualified)
16. (Canada) Maureen Drake (first round)
17. (Italy) Adriana Serra Zanetti (first round)
18. (Ukraine) Yuliya Beygelzimer (qualifying competition)
19. (Colombia) Catalina Castaño (first round)
20. (United States) Teryn Ashley (first round)
21. (United States) Meilen Tu (first round)
22. (France) Séverine Beltrame (qualifying competition)
23. (France) Camille Pin (first round)
24. (Australia) Samantha Stosur (qualified)
25. (United States) Shenay Perry (qualified)
26. (France) Stéphanie Foretz (qualifying competition)

=== Qualifiers ===
1. (Argentina) Gisela Dulko
2. (Germany) Angelika Rösch
3. (Croatia) Silvija Talaja
4. (Australia) Samantha Stosur
5. (Austria) Sybille Bammer
6. (United States) Marissa Irvin
7. (Russia) Alina Jidkova
8. (Czech Republic) Barbora Strýcová
9. (Germany) Anna-Lena Grönefeld
10. (Spain) Marta Marrero
11. (United States) Shenay Perry
12. (Italy) Antonella Serra Zanetti

=== Lucky losers ===
1. (Czech Republic) Iveta Benešová
2. (Czech Republic) Eva Birnerová

=== Qualifying draw ===
==== First qualifier ====
First round				Qualifying competition
1	(Argentina) Gisela Dulko	6	6
	(Argentina) Natalia Gussoni	1	2	1	(Argentina) Gisela Dulko	7^{7}	6
WC	(United States) Brittany Blalock	0	1	22	(France) Séverine Beltrame	6^{3}	4
22	(France) Séverine Beltrame	6	6

==== Second qualifier ====
First round					Qualifying competition
26	(France) Stéphanie Foretz	3	6	6
WC	(United States) Riza Zalameda	6	2	2	26	(France) Stéphanie Foretz	2	3
	(Germany) Angelika Rösch	6	6			(Germany) Angelika Rösch	6	6
16	(Canada) Maureen Drake	3	4

==== Third qualifier ====
First round				Qualifying competition
3	(Croatia) Silvija Talaja	6	6
	(United States) Jennifer Hopkins	3	2	3	(Croatia) Silvija Talaja	6	6
	(United States) Ansley Cargill	3	4	14	(Germany) Julia Schruff	3	4
14	(Germany) Julia Schruff	6	6

==== Fourth qualifier ====
First round				Qualifying competition
4	(Czech Republic) Iveta Benešová	6	6
	(Croatia) Ivana Abramović	4	2	4	(Czech Republic) Iveta Benešová	3	4
WC	(Canada) Martina Nejedly	6^{5}	4	24	(Australia) Samantha Stosur	6	6
24	(Australia) Samantha Stosur	7^{7}	6

==== Fifth qualifier ====
First round					Qualifying competition
5	(Czech Republic) Eva Birnerová	6	3	6
	(Chinese Taipei) Janet Lee	4	6	2	5	(Czech Republic) Eva Birnerová	2	3
	(Austria) Sybille Bammer	6	6			(Austria) Sybille Bammer	6	6
23	(France) Camille Pin	1	3

==== Sixth qualifier ====
First round					Qualifying competition
6	(Bosnia and Herzegovina) Mervana Jugić-Salkić	1	6^{5}
	(United States) Marissa Irvin	6	7^{7}			(United States) Marissa Irvin	6	6
WC	(United States) Christina Fusano	6	5	6	WC	(United States) Christina Fusano	3	4
21	(United States) Meilen Tu	4	7	2

==== Seventh qualifier ====
First round					Qualifying competition
7	(Russia) Alina Jidkova	7	6
	(United States) Abigail Spears	5	4		7	(Russia) Alina Jidkova	6	6
	(United States) Bethanie Mattek	6	5	1	18	(Ukraine) Yuliya Beygelzimer	2	2
18	(Ukraine) Yuliya Beygelzimer	4	7	6

==== Eighth qualifier ====
First round				Qualifying competition
8	(Spain) Conchita Martínez Granados	6	6
	(Bulgaria) Svetlana Krivencheva	1	1	8	(Spain) Conchita Martínez Granados	3	2
	(Slovakia) Eva Fislová	4	1	15	(Czech Republic) Barbora Strýcová	6	6
15	(Czech Republic) Barbora Strýcová	6	6

==== Ninth qualifier ====
First round				Qualifying competition
9	(Germany) Anna-Lena Grönefeld	6	6
	(Romania) Ruxandra Dragomir Ilie	2	0	9	(Germany) Anna-Lena Grönefeld	4	7	6
	(Czech Republic) Renata Voráčová	7^{7}	6		(Czech Republic) Renata Voráčová	6	5	4
20	(United States) Teryn Ashley	6^{4}	4

==== Tenth qualifier ====
First round					Qualifying competition
10	(Spain) Marta Marrero	6	6
	(Slovakia) Jarmila Gajdošová	4	2		10	(Spain) Marta Marrero	6	6
WC	(United States) Anne Yelsey	3	7	6	WC	(United States) Anne Yelsey	0	0
17	(Italy) Adriana Serra Zanetti	6	5	3

==== Eleventh qualifier ====
First round					Qualifying competition
11	(United States) Tara Snyder	3	5
	(United States) Julie Ditty	6	7			(United States) Julie Ditty	3	1
	(United States) Allison Bradshaw	6	3	4	25	(United States) Shenay Perry	6	6
25	(United States) Shenay Perry	4	6	6

==== Twelfth qualifier ====
First round					Qualifying competition
12	(Italy) Antonella Serra Zanetti	2	6	5
WC	(United States) Ann Mall	6	2	0^{r}	12	(Italy) Antonella Serra Zanetti	7^{7}	6
	(United States) Lilia Osterloh	4	7	6		(United States) Lilia Osterloh	6^{5}	4
19	(Colombia) Catalina Castaño	6	5	1
