= 2006 J&S Cup =

Coordinates: 52°13′11.6″N 21°2′16.3″E

- Date: 1–7 May
- Edition: 11th
- Category: Tier II
- Draw: 28S / 16D
- Surface: Clay / outdoor
- Location: Warsaw, Poland

Champions

Singles
- (Belgium) Kim Clijsters

Doubles
- (Russia) Anastasia Myskina / (Russia) Elena Likhovtseva
← 2005 ·	J&S Cup	· 2007 →

The 2006 J&S Cup was a Tier II event on the 2006 WTA Tour that run from 1 May until 7 May 2006. It was held in Warsaw, Poland, and was the 11th year that the J&S Cup was staged. Kim Clijsters won her first Warsaw title and first overall of the year.

== Finals ==
=== Singles ===
(Belgium) Kim Clijsters defeated (Russia) Svetlana Kuznetsova, 7–5, 6–2

=== Doubles ===
(Russia) Anastasia Myskina / (Russia) Elena Likhovtseva defeated (Spain) Anabel Medina Garrigues / (Slovenia) Katarina Srebotnik, 6–3, 6–4

== Entrants ==
=== Seeds ===
Player	Nationality	Ranking*	Seeding
Kim Clijsters	Belgium	2	1
Patty Schnyder	Switzerland	4	2
Elena Dementieva	Russia	9	3
Svetlana Kuznetsova	Russia	10	4
Francesca Schiavone	Italy	11	5
Anastasia Myskina	Russia	12	6
Venus Williams	United States	13	7
Daniela Hantuchová	Slovakia	16	9

- Seedings are based on the rankings of April 24, 2006.
- Anna-Lena Grönefeld No. 8 seed withdrew due to left hamstring strain, so Daniela Hantuchová become No. 9 seed

=== Other entrants ===
The following players received wildcards into the main draw:

- (Poland) Agnieszka Radwańska
- (Poland) Urszula Radwańska

The following players received entry from the qualifying draw:

- (Switzerland) Emmanuelle Gagliardi
- (Ukraine) Tatiana Perebiynis
- (Ukraine) Julia Vakulenko
- (Russia) Galina Voskoboeva

The following players received entry as lucky losers:

- (Bulgaria) Tsvetana Pironkova
