= 2007 J&S Cup =

- Date: 30 April – 6 May
- Edition: 12th
- Category: Tier II
- Draw: 28S / 16D
- Surface: Clay / outdoor
- Location: Warsaw, Poland

Champions

Singles
- (Belgium) Justine Henin

Doubles
- (Russia) Vera Dushevina / (Ukraine) Tatiana Perebiynis
← 2006 ·	Warsaw Open	· 2009 →

The 2007 J&S Cup was a Tier II event on the 2007 WTA Tour that ran from 30 April until 6 May 2007. It was held in Warsaw, Poland, and was the 12th year that the event was staged. Justine Henin won her second Warsaw title and third overall of the year after other victories in Dubai and Doha.

The event was also Kim Clijsters' last professional tournament before taking a break from the sport to start a family. The Belgian lost in the second round to qualifier Julia Vakulenko, and just a few days after announced her retirement from professional tennis. She would eventually return to the sport in 2009 after giving birth to a daughter in 2008.

== Entrants ==
=== Seeds ===
Player	Nationality	Ranking*	Seeding
Justine Henin	Belgium	1	1
Kim Clijsters	Belgium	4	2
Svetlana Kuznetsova	Russia	5	3
Jelena Janković	Serbia	7	4
Nadia Petrova	Russia	9	5
Anna Chakvetadze	Russia	11	6
Elena Dementieva	Russia	13	7
Katarina Srebotnik	Slovenia	21	8

- Seedings are based on the rankings of April 23, 2007.

=== Other entrants ===
The following players received wildcards into the main draw:

- (Poland) Katarzyna Piter
- (Poland) Urszula Radwańska

The following players received entry from the qualifying draw:

- (Ukraine) Kateryna Bondarenko
- (Austria) Tamira Paszek
- (Bulgaria) Tsvetana Pironkova
- (Ukraine) Julia Vakulenko

== Finals ==
=== Singles ===
(Belgium) Justine Henin defeated (Ukraine) Alona Bondarenko, 6–1, 6–3

- It was Justine Henin third title of the year, and second J&S Cup title.

=== Doubles ===
(Russia) Vera Dushevina / (Ukraine) Tatiana Perebiynis defeated (Russia) Elena Likhovtseva / (Russia) Elena Vesnina, 7–5, 3–6, [10–2]
