= 2005 J&S Cup – Singles =

Singles
- 2005 J&S Cup

Final
- Champion: (Belgium) Justine Henin-Hardenne
- Runner-up: (Russia) Svetlana Kuznetsova
- Score: 3–6, 6–2, 7–5

Details
- Draw: 28
- Seeds: 8

Events
Singles	Doubles
← 2004 ·	J&S Cup	· 2006 →

Venus Williams was the defending champion, but chose not to participate that year.

Unseeded Justine Henin-Hardenne won the title, defeating Svetlana Kuznetsova in the final, 3–6, 6–2, 7–5.

== Seeds ==
1. (France) Amélie Mauresmo (withdrew)
2. (Russia) Svetlana Kuznetsova (final)
3. (Russia) Vera Zvonareva (second round)
4. (Switzerland) Patty Schnyder (quarterfinals)
5. (Russia) Elena Bovina (quarterfinals)
6. (France) Nathalie Dechy (quarterfinals)
7. (Belgium) Kim Clijsters (semifinals)
8. (Italy) Silvia Farina Elia (quarterfinals)
9. (Italy) Francesca Schiavone (first round)

== Draw ==
=== Key ===
- Q = Qualifier
- WC = Wild card
- LL = Lucky loser
- Alt = Alternate
- ITF = ITF entry
- PR = Protected ranking
- SR = Special ranking
- SE = Special exempt
- JE = Junior exempt
- JR = Junior Accelerator Programme entrant
- CO = College Accelerator Programme entrant
- NG = Next Gen Accelerator Program entrant
- w/o = Walkover
- r = Retired
- d = Defaulted

=== Finals ===
Semifinals
(Serbia and Montenegro) Ana Ivanovic	4	5
(Belgium) Justine Henin-Hardenne	6	7
7	(Belgium) Kim Clijsters	6	2	3
2	(Russia) Svetlana Kuznetsova	2	6	6

Final
(Belgium) Justine Henin-Hardenne	3	6	7
2	(Russia) Svetlana Kuznetsova	6	2	5

=== Top half ===
First round
(Slovakia) M Suchá	0	0
(Serbia and Montenegro) A Ivanovic	6	6
(France) V Razzano	6^{4}	5
(Poland) M Domachowska	7	7
(Bulgaria) M Maleeva	4	4
6	(France) N Dechy	6	6
Q	(Ukraine) J Vakulenko	7	6
Q	(Russia) A Chakvetadze	6^{5}	1
(Belgium) J Henin-Hardenne	6	6
LL	(Czech Republic) D Chládková	2	2
(Venezuela) M Vento-Kabchi	5
9	(Italy) F Schiavone	1	r

Second round
3	(Russia) V Zvonareva	2	4
(Serbia and Montenegro) A Ivanovic	6	6
(Poland) M Domachowska	4	6^{4}
6	(France) N Dechy	6	7
4	(Switzerland) P Schnyder	6	6
Q	(Ukraine) J Vakulenko	2	4
(Belgium) J Henin-Hardenne	6	7
(Venezuela) M Vento-Kabchi	3	5

Quarterfinals
(Serbia and Montenegro) A Ivanovic	7	6
6	(France) N Dechy	6^{2}	4
4	(Switzerland) P Schnyder	1	2
(Belgium) J Henin-Hardenne	6	6

Semifinals
(Serbia and Montenegro) A Ivanovic	4	5
(Belgium) J Henin-Hardenne	6	7

=== Bottom half ===
First round
7	(Belgium) K Clijsters	7	6^{5}	6
LL	(Ukraine) T Perebiynis	5	7	1
Q	(Russia) M Kirilenko	6	6
(Czech Republic) I Benešová	1	2
WC	(Poland) K Kosińska	4	5
(Slovakia) D Hantuchová	6	7
8	(Italy) S Farina Elia	6	6
LL	(Czech Republic) M Paštiková	2	0
(Russia) V Dushevina	3	4
Q	(Czech Republic) Z Ondrášková	6	6
(Czech Republic) K Koukalová	5	5
(Israel) A Smashnova	7	7

Second round
7	(Belgium) K Clijsters	6	6
Q	(Russia) M Kirilenko	2	1
(Slovakia) D Hantuchová	4	6	3
5	(Russia) E Bovina	6	4	6
8	(Italy) S Farina Elia	6	6
Q	(Czech Republic) Z Ondrášková	1	2
(Israel) A Smashnova	2	6	0
2	(Russia) S Kuznetsova	6	4	6

Quarterfinals
7	(Belgium) K Clijsters	7	6
5	(Russia) E Bovina	6^{4}	3
8	(Italy) S Farina Elia	3	4
2	(Russia) S Kuznetsova	6	6

Semifinals
7	(Belgium) K Clijsters	6	2	3
2	(Russia) S Kuznetsova	2	6	6
