= 2007 J&S Cup – Singles =

Singles
- 2007 J&S Cup

Final
- Champion: (Belgium) Justine Henin
- Runner-up: (Ukraine) Alona Bondarenko
- Score: 6-1, 6-3

Details
- Draw: 28
- Seeds: 8

Events
Singles	Doubles
← 2006 ·	Warsaw Open	· 2008 →

Kim Clijsters was the defending champion, but lost in the second round to Julia Vakulenko in her last professional match for over two years.
Justine Henin won in the final against Alona Bondarenko 6-1, 6-3

== Seeds ==
1. (Belgium) Justine Henin (champion)
2. (Belgium) Kim Clijsters (second round)
3. (Russia) Svetlana Kuznetsova (semifinals)
4. (Serbia) Jelena Janković (semifinals)
5. (Russia) Nadia Petrova (second round)
6. (Russia) Anna Chakvetadze (quarterfinals)
7. (Russia) Elena Dementieva (second round)
8. (Slovenia) Katarina Srebotnik (first round)

== Draw ==
=== Key ===
- Q = Qualifier
- WC = Wild card
- LL = Lucky loser
- Alt = Alternate
- SE = Special exempt
- PR = Protected ranking
- ITF = ITF entry
- JE = Junior exempt
- w/o = Walkover
- r = Retired
- d = Defaulted
- SR = Special ranking

=== Finals ===
Semifinals
1	(Belgium) Justine Henin	7	2	6
4	(Serbia) Jelena Janković	5	6	4
3	(Russia) Svetlana Kuznetsova	2	6^{4}
(Ukraine) Alona Bondarenko	6	7

Final
1	(Belgium) Justine Henin	6	6
(Ukraine) Alona Bondarenko	1	3

=== Top half ===
First round
(Estonia) K Kanepi	2	4
(Germany) A-L Grönefeld	6	6
(Italy) M Santangelo	6	6
(France) S Brémond	2	3
WC	(Poland) K Piter	3	5
5	(Russia) N Petrova	6	7
WC	(Poland) U Radwańska	6	6^{4}	3
(Russia) E Vesnina	2	7	6
(Italy) T Garbin	6	6
(United States) L Granville	4	2
(United States) J Craybas	6^{6}	5
6	(Russia) A Chakvetadze	7	7

Second round
1	(Belgium) J Henin	6	6
(Germany) A-L Grönefeld	1	2
(Italy) M Santangelo	6	6
5	(Russia) N Petrova	3	3
4	(Serbia) J Janković	6	7
(Russia) E Vesnina	2	5
(Italy) T Garbin	2	2
6	(Russia) A Chakvetadze	6	6

Quarterfinals
1	(Belgium) J Henin	6	6
(Italy) M Santangelo	2	1
4	(Serbia) J Janković	7	3
6	(Russia) A Chakvetadze	6^{1}	1	r

Semifinals
1	(Belgium) J Henin	7	2	6
4	(Serbia) J Janković	5	6	4

=== Bottom half ===
First round
7	(Russia) E Dementieva	6^{5}	6	7
(United States) M Tu	7	0	5
(Netherlands) M Krajicek	4	3
(United States) V Williams	6	6
Q	(Ukraine) K Bondarenko	6	6^{3}	6
Q	(Austria) T Paszek	1	7	1
8	(Slovenia) K Srebotnik	3	6	1
(Ukraine) A Bondarenko	6	4	6
Q	(Bulgaria) T Pironkova	5	1
(Poland) A Radwańska	7	6
(Russia) E Likhovtseva	4	1
Q	(Ukraine) J Vakulenko	6	6

Second round
7	(Russia) E Dementieva	1	6^{4}
(United States) V Williams	6	7
Q	(Ukraine) K Bondarenko	6	2	1
3	(Russia) S Kuznetsova	2	6	6
(Ukraine) A Bondarenko	0	6	6
(Poland) A Radwańska	6	4	3
Q	(Ukraine) J Vakulenko	7	6
2	(Belgium) K Clijsters	6^{3}	3

Quarterfinals
(United States) V Williams	6	3	4
3	(Russia) S Kuznetsova	3	6	6
(Ukraine) A Bondarenko	6	3
Q	(Ukraine) J Vakulenko	2	1	r

Semifinals
3	(Russia) S Kuznetsova	2	6^{4}
(Ukraine) A Bondarenko	6	7
