= 2006 J&S Cup – Singles =

Singles
- 2006 J&S Cup

Final
- Champion: (Belgium) Kim Clijsters
- Runner-up: (Russia) Svetlana Kuznetsova
- Score: 7–5, 6–2

Details
- Draw: 28
- Seeds: 8

Events
Singles	Doubles
← 2005 ·	Warsaw Open	· 2007 →

Justine Henin-Hardenne was the defending champion, but withdrew from the tournament due to a back injury.

Kim Clijsters won the title by beating Svetlana Kuznetsova in the finals.

== Seeds ==
1. (Belgium) Kim Clijsters (champion)
2. (Switzerland) Patty Schnyder (second round)
3. (Russia) Elena Dementieva (semifinals)
4. (Russia) Svetlana Kuznetsova (finals)
5. (Italy) Francesca Schiavone (quarterfinals)
6. (Russia) Anastasia Myskina (first round)
7. (United States) Venus Williams (quarterfinals)
8. (Germany) Anna-Lena Grönefeld (withdrew)
9. (Slovakia) Daniela Hantuchová (second round)

== Draw ==
=== Key ===
- Q = Qualifier
- WC = Wild card
- LL = Lucky loser
- Alt = Alternate
- SE = Special exempt
- PR = Protected ranking
- ITF = ITF entry
- JE = Junior exempt
- w/o = Walkover
- r = Retired
- d = Defaulted
- SR = Special ranking

=== Finals ===
Semifinals
1	(Belgium) Kim Clijsters	7	6
3	(Russia) Elena Dementieva	5	4
4	(Russia) Svetlana Kuznetsova	6	6
(Russia) Anna Chakvetadze	1	1

Final
1	(Belgium) Kim Clijsters	7	6
4	(Russia) Svetlana Kuznetsova	5	2

=== Top half ===
First round
Q	(Ukraine) J Vakulenko	6	6
Q	(Switzerland) E Gagliardi	4	1
(Russia) E Likhovtseva	7	4	6
(Spain) A M Garrigues	5	6	1
(Finland) E Laine	0	1
5	(Italy) F Schiavone	6	6
Q	(Ukraine) T Perebiynis	6	4	6
Q	(Russia) G Voskoboeva	3	6	4
(Czech Republic) K Koukalová	7	6
(Czech Republic) I Benešová	6^{3}	4
WC	(Poland) A Radwańska	6	4	6
6	(Russia) A Myskina	4	6	4

Second round
1	(Belgium) K Clijsters	6	6
Q	(Ukraine) J Vakulenko	3	2
(Russia) E Likhovtseva	4	1
5	(Italy) F Schiavone	6	6
3	(Russia) E Dementieva	6	6
Q	(Ukraine) T Perebiynis	2	0
(Czech Republic) K Koukalová	1	2
WC	(Poland) A Radwańska	6	6

Quarterfinals
1	(Belgium) K Clijsters	6	6
5	(Italy) F Schiavone	4	4
3	(Russia) E Dementieva	5	6	6
WC	(Poland) A Radwańska	7	3	1

Semifinals
1	(Belgium) K Clijsters	7	6
3	(Russia) E Dementieva	5	4

=== Bottom half ===
First round
7	(United States) V Williams	6	6
WC	(Poland) U Radwańska	3	3
(Switzerland) M Hingis	7	7
(Russia) M Kirilenko	5	6^{1}
LL	(Bulgaria) T Pironkova	6	6
(Slovenia) K Srebotnik	1	1
9	(Slovakia) D Hantuchová	4	7	6
(Israel) A Smashnova	6	5	3
(Russia) A Chakvetadze	7	6
(Serbia and Montenegro) J Janković	5	3
(Poland) M Domachowska	4	5
(Serbia and Montenegro) A Ivanovic	6	7

Second round
7	(United States) V Williams	4	7	6
(Switzerland) M Hingis	6	5	4
LL	(Bulgaria) T Pironkova	3	1
4	(Russia) S Kuznetsova	6	6
9	(Slovakia) D Hantuchová	4	3
(Russia) A Chakvetadze	6	6
(Serbia and Montenegro) A Ivanovic	6	6
2	(Switzerland) P Schnyder	3	2

Quarterfinals
7	(United States) V Williams	4	2
4	(Russia) S Kuznetsova	6	6
(Russia) A Chakvetadze	4	6	6
(Serbia and Montenegro) A Ivanovic	6	2	4

Semifinals
4	(Russia) S Kuznetsova	6	6
(Russia) A Chakvetadze	1	1
