= 2005 J&S Cup =

- Date: 25 April – 1 May
- Edition: 10th
- Category: Tier II
- Draw: 28S / 16D
- Prize money: $585,000
- Surface: Clay / outdoor
- Location: Warsaw, Poland

Champions

Singles
- (Belgium) Justine Henin-Hardenne

Doubles
- (Ukraine) Tatiana Perebiynis / (Czech Republic) Barbora Strýcová
← 2004 ·	J&S Cup	· 2006 →

The 2005 J&S Cup was a Tier II event on the 2005 WTA Tour that run from 25 April 25 until 1 May 2005. It was held on outdoor clay courts in Warsaw, Poland, and was the 10th year that the event was staged. Unseeded Justine Henin-Hardenne won her first Warsaw title and second overall of the year.

== Finals ==
=== Singles ===
(Belgium) Justine Henin-Hardenne defeated (Russia) Svetlana Kuznetsova, 3–6, 6–2, 7–5

=== Doubles ===
(Ukraine) Tatiana Perebiynis / (Czech Republic) Barbora Strýcová defeated (Poland) Klaudia Jans / (Poland) Alicja Rosolska, 6–1, 6–4

== Entrants ==
=== Seeds ===
Player	Nationality	Ranking*	Seeding
Amélie Mauresmo	France	3	1
Svetlana Kuznetsova	Russia	7	2
Vera Zvonareva	Russia	10	3
Patty Schnyder	Switzerland	13	4
Elena Bovina	Russia	14	5
Nathalie Dechy	France	15	6
Kim Clijsters	Belgium	17	7
Silvia Farina Elia	Italy	19	8
Francesca Schiavone	Italy	20	9

- Seedings are based on the rankings of April 18, 2005.
- Amélie Mauresmo withdrew From the tournament, so Francesca Schiavone became the No. 9 seed.

=== Other entrants ===
The following players received wildcards into the main draw:

- (Poland) Marta Domachowska
- (Poland) Karolina Kosińska

The following players received entry from the qualifying draw:

- (Russia) Anna Chakvetadze
- (Russia) Maria Kirilenko
- (Czech Republic) Zuzana Ondrášková
- (Ukraine) Julia Vakulenko

The following players received entry as lucky losers:

- (Czech Republic) Denisa Chládková
- (Czech Republic) Michaela Paštiková
- (Ukraine) Tatiana Perebiynis
