= 2004 Australian Open – Women's singles =

Women's singles
- 2004 Australian Open

Final
- Champion: (Belgium) Justine Henin-Hardenne
- Runner-up: (Belgium) Kim Clijsters
- Score: 6–3, 4–6, 6–3

Details
- Draw: 128
- Seeds: 32

Events
Singles	men	women		boys	girls
Doubles	men	women	mixed	boys	girls
WC Singles	men	women	quad
WC Doubles	men	women	quad
Legends	men	women	mixed
- Australian Open

Justine Henin-Hardenne defeated Kim Clijsters in the final, 6–3, 4–6, 6–3 to win the women's singles tennis title at the 2004 Australian Open. It was her third major title, each time defeating Clijsters in the final (after her victories at the 2003 French and US Opens). Clijsters would eventually win the title seven years later.

Serena Williams was the reigning champion, but did not participate this year due to a left knee injury.

Fabiola Zuluaga became the first Colombian to reach a major semifinal.

== Seeds ==
1. (Belgium) Justine Henin-Hardenne (champion)
2. (Belgium) Kim Clijsters (final)
3. (United States) Venus Williams (third round)
4. (France) Amélie Mauresmo (quarterfinals, withdrew)
5. (United States) Lindsay Davenport (quarterfinals)
6. (Russia) Anastasia Myskina (quarterfinals)
7. (Russia) Elena Dementieva (first round)
8. (Japan) Ai Sugiyama (second round)
9. (United States) Chanda Rubin (fourth round)
10. (Russia) Nadia Petrova (first round)
11. (Russia) Vera Zvonareva (fourth round)
12. (Argentina) Paola Suárez (third round)
13. (Spain) Conchita Martínez (first round)
14. (Israel) Anna Smashnova-Pistolesi (second round)
15. (Slovakia) Daniela Hantuchová (second round)
16. (Spain) Magüi Serna (first round)
17. (United States) Meghann Shaughnessy (first round)
18. (Italy) Francesca Schiavone (second round)
19. (Greece) Eleni Daniilidou (third round)
20. (Italy) Silvia Farina Elia (fourth round)
21. (Russia) Elena Bovina (second round)
22. (Switzerland) Patty Schnyder (semifinals)
23. (Russia) Lina Krasnoroutskaya (third round)
24. (Bulgaria) Magdalena Maleeva (second round)
25. (United States) Lisa Raymond (quarterfinals)
26. (Slovenia) Tina Pisnik (first round)
27. (South Africa) Amanda Coetzer (second round)
28. (Russia) Maria Sharapova (third round)
29. (France) Nathalie Dechy (fourth round)
30. (Russia) Svetlana Kuznetsova (third round)
31. (Thailand) Tamarine Tanasugarn (first round)
32. (Colombia) Fabiola Zuluaga (semifinals)

== Draw ==
Key

- Q = Qualifier
- WC = Wild card
- LL = Lucky loser
- Alt = Alternate
- ITF = ITF entry
- PR = Protected ranking
- SR = Special ranking
- SE = Special exempt
- JE = Junior exempt
- JR = Junior Accelerator Programme entrant
- CO = College Accelerator Programme entrant
- NG = Next Gen Accelerator Program entrant
- w/o = Walkover
- r = Retired
- d = Defaulted

=== Finals ===
Quarterfinals
1	(Belgium) Justine Henin-Hardenne	7	6
5	(United States) Lindsay Davenport	5	3
4	(France) Amélie Mauresmo	w/o
32	(Colombia) Fabiola Zuluaga
22	(Switzerland) Patty Schnyder	7^{7}	6
25	(United States) Lisa Raymond	6^{2}	3
6	(Russia) Anastasia Myskina	2	6^{9}
2	(Belgium) Kim Clijsters	6	7^{11}

Semifinals
1	(Belgium) Justine Henin-Hardenne	6	6
32	(Colombia) Fabiola Zuluaga	2	2
22	(Switzerland) Patty Schnyder	2	6^{2}
2	(Belgium) Kim Clijsters	6	7^{7}

Final
1	(Belgium) Justine Henin-Hardenne	6	4	6
2	(Belgium) Kim Clijsters	3	6	3

=== Top half ===
==== Section 1 ====
First round
1	(Belgium) J Henin-Hardenne	6	6
WC	(Australia) O Lukaszewicz	0	0
Q	(France) C Pin	6	6^{3}	6
(Italy) T Garbin	4	7^{7}	4
(Italy) F Pennetta	5	4
(Italy) An Serra Zanetti	7	6
Q	(United States) S Perry	3	3
30	(Russia) S Kuznetsova	6	6
19	(Greece) E Daniilidou	6	6
Q	(United States) J Hopkins	1	3
(Belgium) E Callens	6	3	3
(Zimbabwe) C Black	2	6	6
(Argentina) C Fernández	6	3	4
(Austria) B Schett	4	6	6
Q	(Italy) M Santangelo	6^{3}	7	6
16	(Spain) M Serna	7^{7}	5	4

Second round
1	(Belgium) J Henin-Hardenne	6	6
Q	(France) C Pin	1	4
(Italy) An Serra Zanetti	6^{0}	4
30	(Russia) S Kuznetsova	7^{7}	6
19	(Greece) E Daniilidou	3	6	6
(Zimbabwe) C Black	6	0	1
(Austria) B Schett	6^{3}	6	3
Q	(Italy) M Santangelo	7^{7}	0	6

Third round
1	(Belgium) J Henin-Hardenne	6	7
30	(Russia) S Kuznetsova	2	5
19	(Greece) E Daniilidou	4	7	3
Q	(Italy) M Santangelo	6	5	6

Fourth round
1	(Belgium) J Henin-Hardenne	6	7^{7}
Q	(Italy) M Santangelo	1	6^{5}

==== Section 2 ====
First round
11	(Russia) V Zvonareva	6	6
(Czech Republic) Z Ondrášková	3	1
(Hungary) M Czink	6	6
(Venezuela) M Vento-Kabchi	4	3
(Japan) A Morigami	7^{7}	4	6
Q	(Canada) M-È Pelletier	6^{2}	6	4
(Australia) N Pratt	6	5	6
17	(United States) M Shaughnessy	4	7	4
31	(Thailand) T Tanasugarn	1	3
(United States) L Granville	6	6
WC	(Australia) E Dominikovic	4	7	6
WC	(Australia) T Musgrave	6	5	3
(France) É Loit	7	6
(Spain) M Marrero	5	4
PR	(Romania) R Dragomir-Ilie	2	3
5	(United States) L Davenport	6	6

Second round
11	(Russia) V Zvonareva	7	6
(Hungary) M Czink	5	4
(Japan) A Morigami	6	3	3
(Australia) N Pratt	1	6	6
(United States) L Granville	6	2	6
WC	(Australia) E Dominikovic	2	6	1
(France) É Loit	3	6	0
5	(United States) L Davenport	6	3	6

Third round
11	(Russia) V Zvonareva	7	2	6
(Australia) N Pratt	5	6	1
(United States) L Granville	4	0
5	(United States) L Davenport	6	6

Fourth round
11	(Russia) V Zvonareva	1	3
5	(United States) L Davenport	6	6

==== Section 3 ====
First round
4	(France) A Mauresmo	6	6
WC	(Chinese Taipei) C-j Chuang	1	0
WC	(Australia) C Dellacqua	4	4
(Slovakia) Ľ Cervanová	6	6
(United States) A Cargill	3	4
(Spain) A Medina Garrigues	6	6
Q	(Ukraine) Y Fedak	7	6
26	(Slovenia) T Pisnik	5	0
21	(Russia) E Bovina	4	6	7
(Czech Republic) S Kleinová	6	1	5
(Ukraine) T Perebiynis	0	0
(Luxembourg) C Schaul	6	6
Q	(Germany) A Bachmann	1	4
(Australia) A Molik	6	6
(Italy) Ad Serra Zanetti	6^{5}	4
15	(Slovakia) D Hantuchová	7^{7}	6

Second round
4	(France) A Mauresmo	6	6
(Slovakia) Ľ Cervanová	0	2
(Spain) A Medina Garrigues	6	2	6
Q	(Ukraine) Y Fedak	2	6	3
21	(Russia) E Bovina	4	3
(Luxembourg) C Schaul	6	6
(Australia) A Molik	6	6
15	(Slovakia) D Hantuchová	4	3

Third round
4	(France) A Mauresmo	6	6
(Spain) A Medina Garrigues	1	2
(Luxembourg) C Schaul	7^{7}	1	2
(Australia) A Molik	6^{4}	6	6

Fourth round
4	(France) A Mauresmo	7	7
(Australia) A Molik	5	5

==== Section 4 ====
First round
10	(Russia) N Petrova	3	3
(Hungary) A Kapros	6	6
WC	(Australia) S Stosur	6	6
(Croatia) S Talaja	3	2
(Spain) G León García	4	6	4
(Hungary) P Mandula	6	4	6
(United States) S Reeves	1	0
24	(Bulgaria) M Maleeva	6	6
32	(Colombia) F Zuluaga	6	6
(Japan) S Asagoe	3	2
(Russia) A Jidkova	2	6^{5}
Q	(Argentina) M Díaz Oliva	6	7^{7}
(Italy) R Grande	2	1
(United States) J Craybas	6	6
(Serbia and Montenegro) J Janković	6	6
7	(Russia) E Dementieva	1	4

Second round
(Hungary) A Kapros	6	6
WC	(Australia) S Stosur	3	1
(Hungary) P Mandula	6^{6}	6	6
24	(Bulgaria) M Maleeva	7^{8}	2	3
32	(Colombia) F Zuluaga	6	6
Q	(Argentina) M Díaz Oliva	3	4
(United States) J Craybas	6	2	8
(Serbia and Montenegro) J Janković	4	6	6

Third round
(Hungary) A Kapros	3	6	12
(Hungary) P Mandula	6	3	10
32	(Colombia) F Zuluaga	7^{8}	4	6
(United States) J Craybas	6^{6}	6	2

Fourth round
(Hungary) A Kapros	4	2
32	(Colombia) F Zuluaga	6	6

=== Bottom half ===
==== Section 5 ====
First round
8	(Japan) A Sugiyama	6	6
(Russia) T Panova	4	2
(Switzerland) M Casanova	3	6	4
(Japan) S Obata	6	4	6
Q	(Israel) T Obziler	6	6
(Slovakia) M Suchá	3	2
(Croatia) J Kostanić	5	4
29	(France) N Dechy	7	6
22	(Switzerland) P Schnyder	6	5	6
(Indonesia) A Widjaja	3	7	3
(United States) A Stevenson	3	1
(France) M Bartoli	6	6
(Czech Republic) E Birnerová	4	3
(Ukraine) J Vakulenko	6	6
Q	(Argentina) G Dulko	2	2
12	(Argentina) P Suárez	6	6

Second round
8	(Japan) A Sugiyama	4	4
(Japan) S Obata	6	6
Q	(Israel) T Obziler	3	0
29	(France) N Dechy	6	6
22	(Switzerland) P Schnyder	6	2	6
(France) M Bartoli	4	6	3
(Ukraine) J Vakulenko	3	4
12	(Argentina) P Suárez	6	6

Third round
(Japan) S Obata	5	1
29	(France) N Dechy	7	6
22	(Switzerland) P Schnyder	7	6
12	(Argentina) P Suárez	5	3

Fourth round
29	(France) N Dechy	2	4
22	(Switzerland) P Schnyder	6	6

==== Section 6 ====
First round
14	(Israel) A Smashnova-Pistolesi	6	6
(Czech Republic) K Koukalová	3	3
WC	(France) T Golovin	6	4
(Switzerland) M-G Mikaelian	0	1	r
(Spain) A Parra Santonja	5	1
Q	(Czech Republic) B Strýcová	7	6
(Croatia) K Šprem	3	4
23	(Russia) L Krasnoroutskaya	6	6
25	(United States) L Raymond	5	6	6
(Spain) M Sánchez Lorenzo	7	3	4
(Germany) A Barna	2	6	7
(Canada) M Drake	6	0	5
(Russia) V Dushevina	6	4	6
(China) J Zheng	2	6	0
(United States) A Harkleroad	2	1
3	(United States) V Williams	6	6

Second round
14	(Israel) A Smashnova-Pistolesi	2	3
WC	(France) T Golovin	6	6
Q	(Czech Republic) B Strýcová	3	6	3
23	(Russia) L Krasnoroutskaya	6	4	6
25	(United States) L Raymond	6	6
(Germany) A Barna	3	4
(Russia) V Dushevina	4	2
3	(United States) V Williams	6	6

Third round
WC	(France) T Golovin	6	7^{7}
23	(Russia) L Krasnoroutskaya	2	6^{4}
25	(United States) L Raymond	6	7^{7}
3	(United States) V Williams	4	6^{5}

Fourth round
WC	(France) T Golovin	2	0
25	(United States) L Raymond	6	6

==== Section 7 ====
First round
6	(Russia) A Myskina	6	7
(Sweden) S Arvidsson	2	5
(Switzerland) E Gagliardi	7^{7}	7
Q	(Czech Republic) L Prusová	6^{5}	5
WC	(Australia) S Ferguson	3	1
LL	(United States) L Lee-Waters	6	6
(Spain) C Martínez Granados	4	3
28	(Russia) M Sharapova	6	6
18	(Italy) F Schiavone	7	6
(Spain) C Torrens Valero	5	1
(Russia) E Likhovtseva	3	6	6
(Madagascar) D Randriantefy	6	1	1
(Czech Republic) D Chládková	6	6
(France) S Foretz	4	2
(Sweden) A Svensson	3	6	3
9	(United States) C Rubin	6	4	6

Second round
6	(Russia) A Myskina	6	6
(Switzerland) E Gagliardi	2	4
LL	(United States) L Lee-Waters	1	3
28	(Russia) M Sharapova	6	6
18	(Italy) F Schiavone	2	2
(Russia) E Likhovtseva	6	6
(Czech Republic) D Chládková	2	4
9	(United States) C Rubin	6	6

Third round
6	(Russia) A Myskina	6	1	6
28	(Russia) M Sharapova	4	6	2
(Russia) E Likhovtseva	3	2
9	(United States) C Rubin	6	6

Fourth round
6	(Russia) A Myskina	6^{3}	6	6
9	(United States) C Rubin	7^{7}	2	2

==== Section 8 ====
First round
13	(Spain) C Martínez	6^{7}	1
(Puerto Rico) K Brandi	7^{9}	6
(France) S Cohen-Aloro	6	5	3
(United States) A Frazier	4	7	6
(Slovenia) K Srebotnik	4	3
(Spain) V Ruano Pascual	6	6
(Slovakia) H Nagyová	3	3
20	(Italy) S Farina Elia	6	6
27	(South Africa) A Coetzer	6	6
(United States) T Snyder	3	1
(Slovakia) Ľ Kurhajcová	3	6^{1}
(Russia) D Safina	6	7^{7}
(Venezuela) M Sequera	2	2
(Italy) ME Camerin	6	6
(Germany) M Weingärtner	3	2
2	(Belgium) K Clijsters	6	6

Second round
(Puerto Rico) K Brandi	6	0	5
(United States) A Frazier	2	6	7
(Spain) V Ruano Pascual	7	4	4
20	(Italy) S Farina Elia	5	6	6
27	(South Africa) A Coetzer	5	3
(Russia) D Safina	7	6
(Italy) ME Camerin	0	0
2	(Belgium) K Clijsters	6	6

Third round
(United States) A Frazier	6	1	5
20	(Italy) S Farina Elia	4	6	7
(Russia) D Safina	2	1
2	(Belgium) K Clijsters	6	6

Fourth round
20	(Italy) S Farina Elia	3	3
2	(Belgium) K Clijsters	6	6

== Championship match statistics ==
Category	(Belgium) Henin-Hardenne	(Belgium) Clijsters
1st serve %	38/77 (49%)	60/91 (66%)
1st serve points won	31 of 38 = 82%	37 of 60 = 62%
2nd serve points won	17 of 39 = 44%	11 of 31 = 35%
Total service points won	48 of 77 = 62.34%	48 of 91 = 52.75%
Aces	4	1
Double faults	6	6
Winners	31	37
Unforced errors	38	43
Net points won	14 of 18 = 78%	14 of 28 = 50%
Break points converted	6 of 8 = 75%	4 of 6 = 67%
Return points won	43 of 91 = 47%	29 of 77 = 38%
Total points won	91	77

Preceded by 2003 US Open – Women's singles	Grand Slam women's singles	Succeeded by 2004 French Open – Women's singles
