= 2006 J&S Cup – Doubles =

Doubles
- 2006 J&S Cup

Final
- Champions: (Russia) Elena Likhovtseva (Russia) Anastasia Myskina
- Runners-up: (Spain) Anabel Medina Garrigues (Slovenia) Katarina Srebotnik
- Score: 6–3, 6–4

Details
- Draw: 16
- Seeds: 4

Events
Singles	Doubles
← 2005 ·	Warsaw Open	· 2007 →

Tatiana Perebiynis and Barbora Strýcová were the defending champions, but Strýcová chose not to compete that year. Perebiynis partnered with Martina Müller.
Elena Likhovtseva and Anastasia Myskina won in the final 6–3, 6–4 against Anabel Medina Garrigues and Katarina Srebotnik

== Seeds ==
1. (South Africa) Liezel Huber / (United States) Martina Navratilova (first round)
2. (Spain) Anabel Medina Garrigues / (Slovenia) Katarina Srebotnik (final)
3. (Russia) Elena Likhovtseva / (Russia) Anastasia Myskina (champions)
4. (Russia) Elena Dementieva / (Russia) Galina Voskoboeva (first round)

== Draw ==
=== Key ===
- Q = Qualifier
- WC = Wild card
- LL = Lucky loser
- Alt = Alternate
- SE = Special exempt
- PR = Protected ranking
- ITF = ITF entry
- JE = Junior exempt
- w/o = Walkover
- r = Retired
- d = Defaulted
- SR = Special ranking

First round
1	(South Africa) L Huber (United States) M Navratilova	2	4
(Serbia and Montenegro) A Ivanovic (Russia) M Kirilenko	6	6
(Czech Republic) I Benešová (Netherlands) M Krajicek	5	7	6
(Poland) M Domachowska (Slovakia) J Husárová	7	6^{1}	4
3	(Russia) E Likhovtseva (Russia) A Myskina	6	6
Q	(Russia) A Chakvetadze (Poland) U Radwańska	2	0
(Poland) K Jans (Poland) A Rosolska	6	6
(Serbia and Montenegro) J Janković (Slovenia) T Križan	1	2
(Czech Republic) G Navrátilová (Czech Republic) M Paštiková	4	6^{5}
(Germany) M Müller (Ukraine) T Perebyinis	6	7
(United States) M Tu (Romania) A Vanc	6	3
4	(Russia) E Dementieva (Russia) G Voskoboeva	2	5	r
(Austria) D Klemenschits (Austria) S Klemenschits	4	2
(Czech Republic) L Hradecká (Czech Republic) V Uhlířová	6	6
WC	(Poland) K Kosińska (Poland) A Radwańska	0	4
2	(Spain) A Medina Garrigues (Slovenia) K Srebotnik	6	6

Quarterfinals
(Serbia and Montenegro) A Ivanovic (Russia) M Kirilenko	6	6
(Czech Republic) I Benešová (Netherlands) M Krajicek	2	3
3	(Russia) E Likhovtseva (Russia) A Myskina	7	7
(Poland) K Jans (Poland) A Rosolska	5	5
(Germany) M Müller (Ukraine) T Perebyinis	6^{3}	1
(United States) M Tu (Romania) A Vanc	7	6
(Czech Republic) L Hradecká (Czech Republic) V Uhlířová	3	5
2	(Spain) A Medina Garrigues (Slovenia) K Srebotnik	6	7

Semifinals
(Serbia and Montenegro) A Ivanovic (Russia) M Kirilenko	3	4
3	(Russia) E Likhovtseva (Russia) A Myskina	6	6
(United States) M Tu (Romania) A Vanc	3	2
2	(Spain) A Medina Garrigues (Slovenia) K Srebotnik	6	6

Final
3	(Russia) E Likhovtseva (Russia) A Myskina	6	6
2	(Spain) A Medina Garrigues (Slovenia) K Srebotnik	3	4
