= 2005 J&S Cup – Doubles =

Doubles
- 2005 J&S Cup

Final
- Champions: (Ukraine) Tatiana Perebiynis (Czech Republic) Barbora Strýcová
- Runners-up: (Poland) Klaudia Jans (Poland) Alicja Rosolska
- Score: 6–1, 6–4

Details
- Draw: 16
- Seeds: 4

Events
Singles	Doubles
← 2004 ·	Warsaw Open	· 2006 →

Silvia Farina Elia and Francesca Schiavone were the defending champions, but they chose not to compete that year together.

Farina Elia partnered with Vera Zvonareva.
Schiavone partnered with Daniela Hantuchová.

Tatiana Perebiynis and Barbora Strýcová won in the final 6–1, 6–4 against Klaudia Jans and Alicja Rosolska

== Seeds ==
1. (Zimbabwe) Cara Black / (South Africa) Liezel Huber (first round)
2. (Slovakia) Daniela Hantuchová / (Italy) Francesca Schiavone (first round)
3. (Australia) Lisa McShea / (Venezuela) María Vento-Kabchi (first round)
4. (Italy) Silvia Farina Elia / (Russia) Vera Zvonareva (quarterfinals)

== Draw ==
=== Key ===
- Q = Qualifier
- WC = Wild card
- LL = Lucky loser
- Alt = Alternate
- ITF = ITF entry
- PR = Protected ranking
- SR = Special ranking
- SE = Special exempt
- JE = Junior exempt
- JR = Junior Accelerator Programme entrant
- CO = College Accelerator Programme entrant
- NG = Next Gen Accelerator Program entrant
- w/o = Walkover
- r = Retired
- d = Defaulted

=== Draw ===
First round
1	(Zimbabwe) C Black (South Africa) L Huber	6	3	6^{5}
Q	(Czech Republic) L Hradecká (Czech Republic) H Šromová	4	6	7
(Czech Republic) D Chládková (Romania) R Dragomir Ilie	6	6
WC	(Poland) O Brózda (Poland) K Kosińska	0	1
3	(Australia) L McShea (Venezuela) M Vento-Kabchi	2	4
(Serbia and Montenegro) A Ivanovic (Slovenia) T Križan	6	6
(Czech Republic) G Navrátilová (Czech Republic) M Paštiková	2	5
(Poland) K Jans (Poland) A Rosolska	6	7
(Czech Republic) I Benešová (Croatia) S Talaja	3	6	6^{8}
(Ukraine) T Perebiynis (Czech Republic) B Strýcová	6	3	7
(Latvia) L Dekmeijere (Japan) N Miyagi	0	1
4	(Italy) S Farina Elia (Russia) V Zvonareva	6	6
(Poland) M Domachowska (Russia) M Kirilenko	6	6
(Ukraine) M Koryttseva (Slovakia) L Tvarošková	0	1
(Russia) A Rodionova (Russia) E Vesnina	w	/	o
2	(Slovakia) D Hantuchová (Italy) F Schiavone

Quarterfinals
Q	(Czech Republic) L Hradecká (Czech Republic) H Šromová	0	3
(Czech Republic) D Chládková (Romania) R Dragomir Ilie	6	6
(Serbia and Montenegro) A Ivanovic (Slovenia) T Križan	1	7	5
(Poland) K Jans (Poland) A Rosolska	6	6^{2}	7
(Ukraine) T Perebiynis (Czech Republic) B Strýcová	7	4	6
4	(Italy) S Farina Elia (Russia) V Zvonareva	5	6	4
(Poland) M Domachowska (Russia) M Kirilenko	6	6
(Russia) A Rodionova (Russia) E Vesnina	2	3

Semifinals
(Czech Republic) D Chládková (Romania) R Dragomir Ilie	6	3	3
(Poland) K Jans (Poland) A Rosolska	0	6	6
(Ukraine) T Perebiynis (Czech Republic) B Strýcová	3	6	6
(Poland) M Domachowska (Russia) M Kirilenko	6	1	3

Final
(Poland) K Jans (Poland) A Rosolska	1	4
(Ukraine) T Perebiynis (Czech Republic) B Strýcová	6	6
