= 2007 J&S Cup – Doubles =

Doubles
- 2007 J&S Cup

Final
- Champions: (Russia) Vera Dushevina (Ukraine) Tatiana Perebiynis
- Runners-up: (Russia) Elena Likhovtseva (Russia) Elena Vesnina
- Score: 7–5, 3–6, [10–2]

Details
- Draw: 16
- Seeds: 4

Events
Singles	Doubles
← 2006 ·	Warsaw Open	· 2008 →

Elena Likhovtseva and Anastasia Myskina were the defending champions, but Myskina chose not to compete that year. Likhovtseva partnered with Elena Vesnina.

Vera Dushevina and Tatiana Perebiynis won in the final 7–5, 3–6, [10–2] against Likhovtseva and Vesnina.

== Seeds ==
1. (Italy) Mara Santangelo
  (Slovenia) Katarina Srebotnik (semifinals)
2. (Russia) Elena Likhovtseva
  (Russia) Elena Vesnina (final)
3. (United States) Meilen Tu
  (Russia) Galina Voskoboeva (quarterfinals)
4. (Slovakia) Jarmila Gajdošová
  (Czech Republic) Vladimíra Uhlířová (first round)

== Draw ==
=== Key ===
- Q = Qualifier
- WC = Wild card
- LL = Lucky loser
- Alt = Alternate
- SE = Special exempt
- PR = Protected ranking
- ITF = ITF entry
- JE = Junior exempt
- w/o = Walkover
- r = Retired
- d = Defaulted
- SR = Special ranking

=== Draw ===
First round
1	(Italy) M Santangelo (Slovenia) K Srebotnik	6	3	[10]
(Poland) K Jans (Poland) A Rosolska	3	6	[7]
(United States) J Craybas (United States) L Granville	7^{7}	7
(Czech Republic) M Paštiková (Czech Republic) H Šromová	6^{5}	5
4	(Slovakia) J Gajdošová (Czech Republic) V Uhlířová	3	3
(Italy) T Garbin (Netherlands) M Krajicek	6	6
(Russia) V Dushevina (Ukraine) T Perebiynis	6	6
(Russia) A Chakvetdze (Poland) A Radwańska	2	4
(Ukraine) A Bondarenko (Ukraine) K Bondarenko	6	6
WC	(Germany) A-L Grönefeld (Poland) U Radwańska	1	2
(France) S Brémond (Slovenia) A Klepač	3	6	[8]
3	(United States) M Tu (Russia) G Voskoboeva	6	3	[10]
(Latvia) L Dekmeijere (Czech Republic) G Navrátilová	5	3
(Poland) O Brózda (Poland) K Kosińska	7	6
(Ukraine) Y Beygelzimer (Belarus) T Poutchek	6^{2}	4
2	(Russia) E Likhovtseva (Russia) E Vesnina	7^{7}	6

Quarterfinals
1	(Italy) M Santangelo (Slovenia) K Srebotnik	6	6
(United States) J Craybas (United States) L Granville	3	0
(Italy) T Garbin (Netherlands) M Krajicek	6^{5}	7	[8]
(Russia) V Dushevina (Ukraine) T Perebiynis	7^{7}	5	[10]
(Ukraine) A Bondarenko (Ukraine) K Bondarenko	6	6
3	(United States) M Tu (Russia) G Voskoboeva	2	1
(Poland) O Brózda (Poland) K Kosińska	6	3	[5]
2	(Russia) E Likhovtseva (Russia) E Vesnina	3	6	[10]

Semifinals
1	(Italy) M Santangelo (Slovenia) K Srebotnik	2	4
(Russia) V Dushevina (Ukraine) T Perebiynis	6	6
(Ukraine) A Bondarenko (Ukraine) K Bondarenko	3	6	[5]
2	(Russia) E Likhovtseva (Russia) E Vesnina	6	2	[10]

Final
(Russia) V Dushevina (Ukraine) T Perebiynis	7	3	[10]
2	(Russia) E Likhovtseva (Russia) E Vesnina	5	6	[2]
