= Julia Vakulenko =

Ukraine-born female tennis player (born 1983)

Julia Vakulenko Юлія Вакуленко
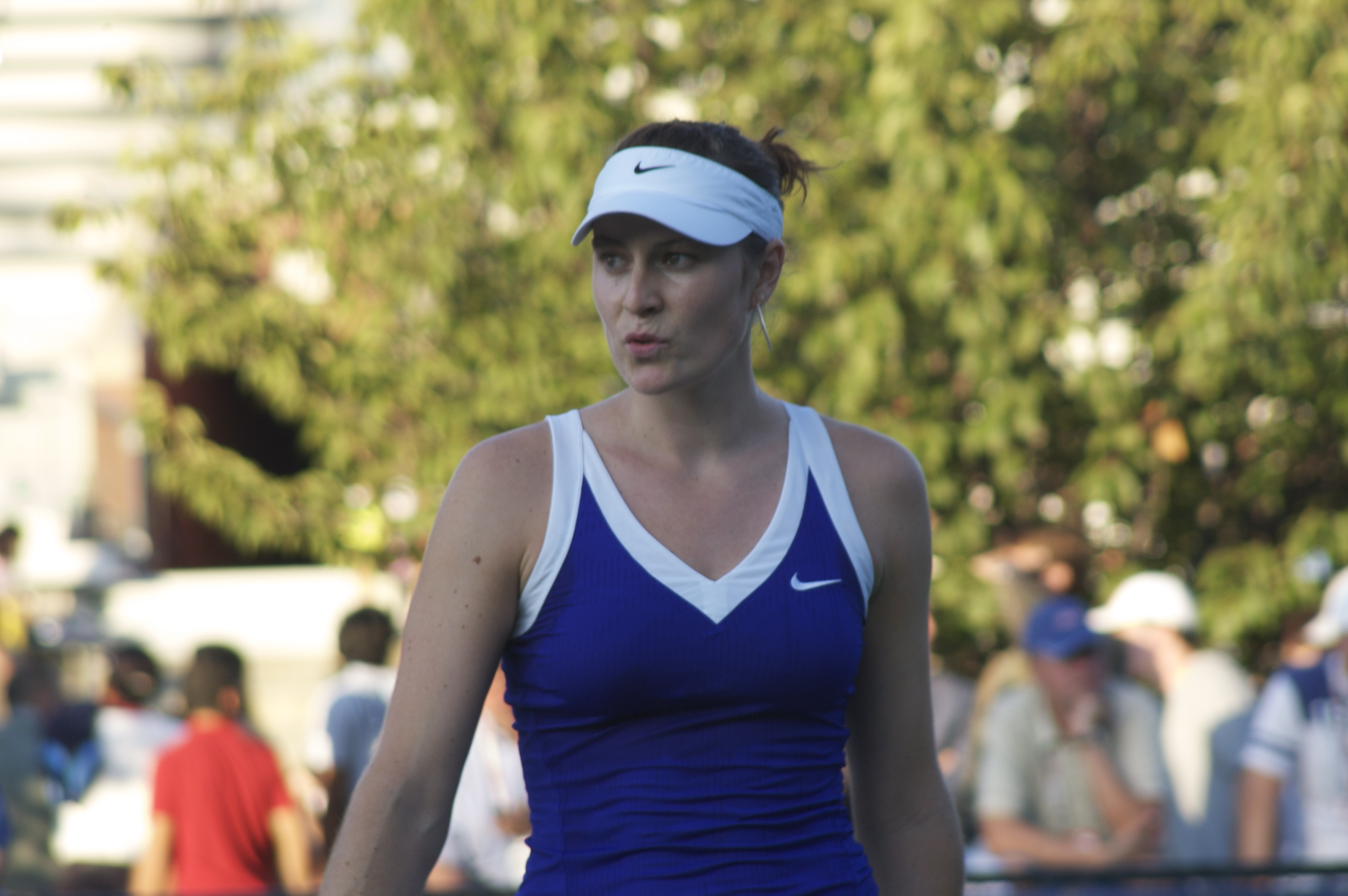
- Country (sports): Ukraine; Spain
- Residence: Barcelona, Spain
- Born: 10 July 1983 (age 43) Yalta, Ukrainian SSR, Soviet Union (now Ukraine)
- Height: 1.83 m (6 ft 0 in)
- Turned pro: 1998
- Retired: 2011
- Plays: Right-handed (two-handed backhand)
- Prize money: $869,480

Singles
- Career record: 282–191
- Career titles: 7 ITF
- Highest ranking: No. 32 (19 November 2007)

Grand Slam singles results
- Australian Open: 2R (2004, 2007)
- French Open: 3R (2003, 2006)
- Wimbledon: 2R (2005)
- US Open: 4R (2007)

Doubles
- Career record: 16–37
- Career titles: 0
- Highest ranking: No. 136 (9 February 2004)

Julia Olehivna Vakulenko (Ukrainian: Юлія Оле́гівна Вакуленко; born 10 July 1983) is a Ukrainian-born Spanish former tennis player. She achieved her career-high singles ranking of world No. 32 in November 2007. Vakulenko reached one WTA Tour final and won seven ITF singles titles.

In April 2008, Vakulenko renounced her Ukrainian citizenship, and then announced her decision to acquire the citizenship of Spain where she had lived for the previous 10 years.

== Career ==
At the 2006 French Open, Vakulenko reached the third round, losing to seventh seed Patty Schnyder.

Having entered the tournament as a qualifier, she defeated then world No. 4 Kim Clijsters in the second round of 2007 J&S Cup in Warsaw, Poland. Vakulenko retired due to injury while trailing by a set and a break of serve in her quarterfinal with fellow Ukrainian player Alona Bondarenko. A week later at the 2007 German Open in Berlin, Vakulenko defeated world No. 3 Amélie Mauresmo and world No. 10 Dinara Safina, both in three sets, on the same day after rain stoppages had caused havoc with the event's schedule. She retired in the first set of her semifinal match against 12th seed and eventual champion Ana Ivanovic due to a hand injury.

On 28 August 2007, in the first round of the US Open, Vakulenko defeated ninth seed Daniela Hantuchová in three sets. She eventually reached the fourth round, her best performance at a major, before falling to Ágnes Szávay.

Seeded third at the final event of the 2007 season, the Bell Challenge in Quebec City, Canada, Vakulenko reached the first WTA Tour final of her career. En route, she defeated Rossana de los Ríos, wildcard entrant Stéphanie Dubois, fifth seed Olga Govortsova and qualifier Julie Ditty. In the championship match, she lost in straight sets to three-time Grand Slam champion Lindsay Davenport, who was playing in only her third event since giving birth.

After changing her citizenship from Ukraine to Spain in April 2008, she planned to play for Spain in the Fed Cup, but was not able to compete in the 2008 Summer Olympics due to lack of time to be included in Spain's application.

== WTA Tour finals ==
=== Singles: 1 (runner-up) ===
Winner – Legend
Grand Slam
Tier I
Tier II
Tier III, IV & V (0–1)

Result	Date	Tournament	Tier	Surface	Opponent	Score
Loss	Nov 2007	Bell Challenge, Canada	Tier III	Carpet (i)	(United States) Lindsay Davenport	4–6, 1–6

== ITF finals ==
Legend
$75,000 tournaments
$50,000 tournaments
$25,000 tournaments
$10,000 tournaments

=== Singles (7–6) ===
Result	No.	Date	Location	Surface	Opponent	Score
Loss	1.	28 September 1998	Lerida, Spain	Clay	(Spain) Mariam Ramón Climent	1–6, 3–6
Win	2.	6 December 1998	Mallorca, Spain	Clay	(Spain) Laura Pena	6–4, 6–1
Loss	3.	3 April 2000	Dinan, France	Clay	(Austria) Melanie Schnell	6–2, 1–6, 2–6
Loss	4.	18 June 2000	Lenzerheide, Switzerland	Clay	(Hungary) Kira Nagy	2–6, 6–3, 6–7
Loss	5.	10 July 2000	Getxo, Spain	Clay	(Spain) María José Martínez Sánchez	4–6, 0–6
Loss	6.	5 August 2001	Saint-Gaudens, France	Clay	(France) Céline Beigbeder	4–6, 1–6
Win	7.	17 November 2002	Deauville, France	Clay (i)	(France) Virginie Pichet	6–2, 6–1
Win	8.	3 December 2002	Daytona Beach, United States	Hard	(United States) Bethanie Mattek-Sands	6–4, 6–0
Win	9.	29 September 2003	Girona, Spain	Clay	(Czech Republic) Barbora Strýcová	7–5, 2–0 ret.
Win	10.	8 February 2009	Rancho Mirage, United States	Hard	(United States) Lauren Albanese	6–0, 6–1
Loss	11.	16 February 2009	Surprise, United States	Hard	(Belgium) Yanina Wickmayer	7–6^{(0)}, 3–6, 3–4 ret.
Win	12.	27 June 2009	Périgueux, France	Clay	(Australia) Sophie Ferguson	6–2, 7–5
Win	13.	10 August 2009	Koksijde, Belgium	Clay	(France) Iryna Brémond	7–5, 6–1

=== Doubles (0–1) ===
Result	Date	Location	Surface	Partner	Opponents	Score
Loss	23 November 2003	Barcelona, Spain	Clay	(Spain) Núria Roig	(Spain) Marta Fraga (Spain) Adriana González-Peñas	3–6, 3–6

== Singles performance timeline ==
Key
W	F	SF	QF	#R	RR	Q#	DNQ	A	NH

(W) winner; (F) finalist; (SF) semifinalist; (QF) quarterfinalist; (#R) rounds 4, 3, 2, 1; (RR) round-robin stage; (Q#) qualification round; (DNQ) did not qualify; (A) absent; (NH) not held; (SR) strike rate (events won / competed); (W–L) win–loss record.

Tournament	2001	2002	2003	2004	2005	2006	2007	2008	2009	2010	Career W-L
Grand Slam tournaments
Australian Open	Q1	A	Q3	2R	A	A	2R	1R	A	Q1	2–3
French Open	A	Q2	3R	1R	A	3R	1R	1R	Q1	A	4–5
Wimbledon	Q3	Q2	1R	1R	2R	1R	1R	1R	Q1	A	1–6
US Open	Q3	A	2R	2R	A	A	4R	1R	Q1	A	5–4
GS Win–loss	0–0	0–0	3–3	2–4	1–1	2–2	4–4	0–4	0–0	0–0	12–18
Tier I tournaments
Doha^{1}	Not Tier I or Was Not Held						A	0–0			
Indian Wells	A	A	1R	A	A	1R	A	0–2			
Miami	A	A	1R	A	A	3R	A	2–2			
Charleston	1R	A	A	A	3R	1R	A	2–3			
Berlin	A	A	1R	A	2R	SF	A	5–3			
Rome	2R	A	A	A	A	A	1R	1–2			
Montreal/Toronto	A	A	A	A	A	1R		0–1			
Tokyo	A	A	1R	A	A	A		0–1			
Moscow	A	A	A	A	A	A		0–0			
San Diego^{1}	A	A	A	A	A	1R	-	0–1			
Zurich^{1}	A	A	A	A	A	A	-	0–0			
Tier II tournaments
Amelia Island^{1}	A	A	A	A	A	2R	-	1–1			
Warsaw^{1}	A	A	A	2R	2R	3R	-	4–3			
Stanford^{1}	A	A	A	A	A	1R	-	0–1			
Los Angeles^{1}	A	A	A	A	A	1R	-	0–1			
Luxembourg^{1}	A	A	A	A	A	1R	-	0–1			
Stuttgart^{1}	A	A	A	A	A	2R	-	1–1			
Linz^{1}	A	A	A	A	A	QF	-	3–1			
Tier III tournaments
Birmingham^{1}	A	A	A	A	A	3R	-	2–1			
Tier IV tournaments
Hyderabad^{1}	A	1R	A	A	A	A	-	0–1			
Tier V tournaments
Casablanca^{1}	A	A	1R	A	A	A	-	0–1			
Year-end ranking	209	73	129	185	120	32		N/A			

- ^{1} Doha became a Tier I tournament in 2008, replacing San Diego and Zürich

== Head-to-head record ==
Players who have been ranked world No. 1 are in boldface.

- **Dinara Safina** 1–1
- Jelena Kostanić 1–0
- Svetlana Kuznetsova
- Flavia Pennetta 2–1
- Daniela Hantuchová 1–1
- Elena Dementieva 0–1
- Patty Schnyder
- Francesca Schiavone
- Anna Chakvetadze 1–0
- **Maria Sharapova** 0–1
- Ai Sugiyama 1–0
- **Jelena Janković** 1–1
- **Amélie Mauresmo** 1–1
- **Kim Clijsters** 1–1
- **Caroline Wozniacki** 0–1
- Anna Kournikova 0–1
- **Lindsay Davenport** 0–1
- **Ana Ivanovic** 0–1
- **Justine Henin** 0–1
- **Serena Williams** 0–1
- Petra Kvitová 0–1
- Mary Pierce 0–1
- Kimiko Date-Krumm
- Paola Suárez
- Alicia Molik
- Marion Bartoli 0–1

== Top 10 wins ==
Season	2007	**Total**
Wins	3	**3**

#	Player	Rank	Event	Surface	Round	Score	JVR
**2007**
1.	(Belgium) Kim Clijsters	No. 4	Warsaw Open	Clay	2R	7–6^{(7–3)}, 6–3	No. 61
2.	(France) Amélie Mauresmo	No. 3	German Open	Clay	3R	2–6, 6–1, 6–2	No. 53
3.	(Russia) Dinara Safina	No. 10	German Open	Clay	QF	6–3, 5–7, 6–3	No. 53
