= Svetlana Kuznetsova =

Russian tennis player (born 1985)

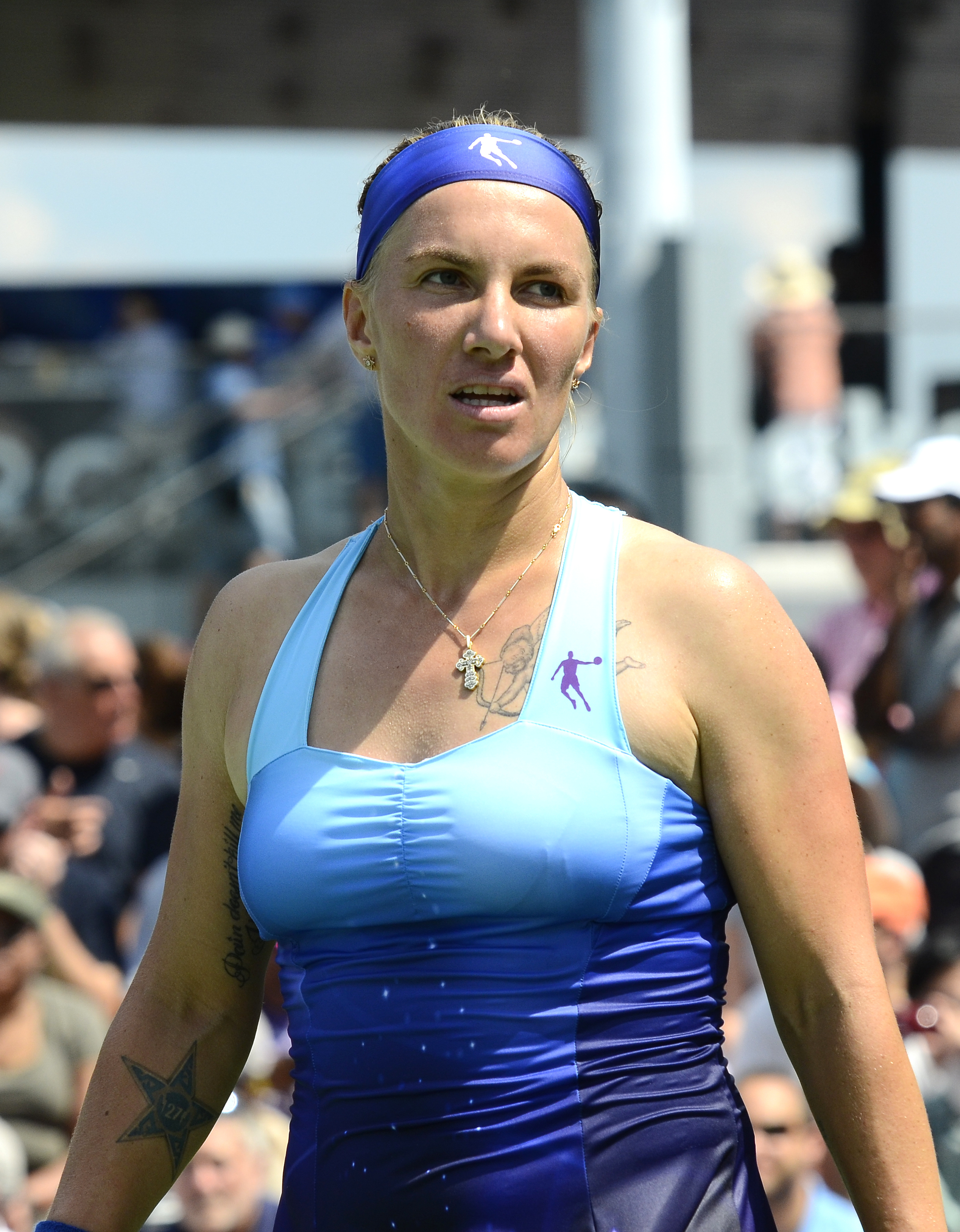
- Kuznetsova at the 2014 US Open
- Country (sports): Russia
- Residence: Moscow, Russia
- Born: 27 June 1985 (age 41) Leningrad, Soviet Union
- Height: 1.74 m (5 ft 9 in)
- Turned pro: 2000
- Retired: 2021
- Plays: Right-handed (two-handed backhand)
- Coach: Gustavo Marcaccio
- Prize money: $25,816,890: 15th in all-time rankings

Singles
- Career record: 670–348
- Career titles: 18
- Highest ranking: No. 2 (10 September 2007)

Grand Slam singles results
- Australian Open: QF (2005, 2009, 2013)
- French Open: W (2009)
- Wimbledon: QF (2003, 2005, 2007, 2017)
- US Open: W (2004)

Other tournaments
- Tour Finals: SF (2016)
- Olympic Games: QF (2004)

Doubles
- Career record: 259–135
- Career titles: 16
- Highest ranking: No. 3 (7 June 2004)

Grand Slam doubles results
- Australian Open: W (2005, 2012)
- French Open: F (2004)
- Wimbledon: F (2005)
- US Open: F (2003, 2004)

Other doubles tournaments
- Tour Finals: SF (2003, 2004)
- Olympic Games: QF (2008, 2016)

Mixed doubles
- Career record: 4–4

Grand Slam mixed doubles results
- Australian Open: 1R (2003, 2014)
- French Open: 2R (2003)
- Wimbledon: QF (2003)

Team competitions
- Fed Cup: W (2004, 2007, 2008); record 27–13

Svetlana Aleksandrovna Kuznetsova (Note: Russian: Светла́на Алекса́ндровна Кузнецо́ва, IPA: [svʲɪtˈlanə kʊznʲɪˈtsovə]) (born 27 June 1985) is a Russian former professional tennis player. She was ranked as high as world No. 2 in singles and No. 3 in doubles by the WTA. During her career, Kuznetsova won 18 singles and 16 doubles titles, including two singles majors at the 2004 US Open and 2009 French Open, and two doubles majors at the 2005 and 2012 Australian Opens.

Kuznetsova first took part in a WTA Tour event in 2001. Her first major title came at the 2004 US Open over compatriot Elena Dementieva, making her the third Russian woman to win a major. Kuznetsova's second major singles title was the 2009 French Open, defeating compatriot Dinara Safina in the final. At the 2006 French Open and the 2007 US Open singles tournaments she was the runner-up, both times to Justine Henin, raising her to a career-high singles ranking of world No. 2. After 2010, Kuznetsova's results declined, but slowly recovered through 2016, when she re-entered the top ten and reached the semifinals of the WTA Finals. She retired from the sport in 2021.

Kuznetsova was also successful in doubles. She won her first five career doubles titles with Arantxa Sánchez Vicario. Partnering Elena Likhovtseva, she climbed to No. 3 in doubles in 2004. She won the Australian Open twice in doubles, in 2005 alongside Alicia Molik and in 2012 partnering Vera Zvonareva.

== Early life ==
Kuznetsova was born in Leningrad. Her father, Aleksandr Kuznetsov, coached five Olympic and world cycling champions. Kuznetsova's mother, Galina Tsareva, is a six-time world champion and holder of 20 world records in cycling, and her brother, Nikolay Kuznetsov, was a silver medalist at the 1996 Summer Olympics in Atlanta and coach of the Russian cycling team Lokomotiv. Kuznetsova never showed interest in cycling, but rather tennis. She liked watching tennis from an early age, preferring men's over women's tennis. "I had posters in my room of MaliVai Washington, Marcelo Ríos, and (Yevgeny) Kafelnikov. It's very weird but this is who I liked. Later I was a big fan of (Marat) Safin.", she said. Kuznetsova began to play tennis at the age of seven, and moved to Spain six years later to receive better training and coaching. While there, she became fluent in Spanish.

== Career ==
=== 2000: Juniors ===
Kuznetsova debuted in her first ITF Circuit tournament in Mallorca on 31 January. In the first round, she defeated Katia Altilia from Italy in straight sets, 6–0, 6–4. However, she lost in the quarterfinal to Oana Elena Golimbioschi. Her next appearance was in Talence in April. She defeated Aurore Desertin in the first round, but lost in the second round to Berengere Karpenschif, both from France. In Minsk, Belarus, in a tournament using the short sets scoring system, she reached the quarterfinal, after defeating the unranked Vera Zvonareva in the first round in four sets, and Daria Panova in three sets in the second round. In the quarterfinal, she lost to 574th ranked Elena Voropaeva in four sets, after losing two tie breaks in the two earlier sets. However, Kuznetsova was ranked in the top 900, receiving her first ranking of 889 during the week ending 20 November 2000. She moved to Mallorca again and lost in the first round to Dinara Safina after winning the first set. Her last tournament of the year was again in Mallorca, but now played in a minimum of four sets. In the round of 32, she defeated Silvia Disderi. However, she fell to eighth seeded Mihaela Moldovan in the last round. She ended the season ranked 889.

=== 2001–2002: First WTA Tour titles ===
Kuznetsova began playing in tournaments on the ITF Circuit in 2000, winning her first title on the circuit in April 2001. Her first appearances in the main draws of tournaments on the main WTA Tour were at the Madrid Open in May of that year and at the Waikoloa Championships in September, losing in the second round on both occasions. She finished the year 2001 ranked 259.

Kuznetsova made her major main-draw debut at the 2002 Australian Open, where, as a qualifier, she reached the second round, before losing to 16th seed Iroda Tulyaganova. However, she previously lost in the qualifying rounds of both the 2001 French Open and 2001 Wimbledon.

As a qualifier at the clay-court Nordic Light Open in Helsinki, Finland in August, Kuznetsova won her first WTA singles title, defeating world No. 24 Patty Schnyder in the quarterfinals for her first win over a top 40 player, before defeating Denisa Chládková in the final. Kuznetsova entered the top 100 for the first time as a result of that victory. Kuznetsova qualified for the US Open, defeating 19th seed Anne Kremer in the first round for her first win over a top 20 player, before losing in the third round to 13th seed Silvia Farina Elia. In September, Kuznetsova won her second title at the hardcourt Bali Tennis Classic in Indonesia, defeating former major champions Arantxa Sánchez Vicario and Conchita Martínez. Also during 2002, she teamed up with Sánchez Vicario to win the first WTA Tour doubles titles of her career, in Sopot, Poland, Helsinki and Kyōtō, Japan. Kuznetsova finished the 2002 season as world No. 43 in singles.

=== 2003: First major quarterfinal ===
Kuznetsova began her season at the Brisbane International. She received a wildcard, but fell in the first round in the singles to Elena Bovina. In the doubles competition, she paired with Martina Navratilova, with whom she would play throughout the year (except on the Indian Wells Open, partnering with Janette Husárová), and won against Nathalie Dechy and Émilie Loit in straight sets. In the Australian Open, she lost to second seed Venus Williams in the first round. With Navratilova, they lost against ninth seed Daniela Hantuchová and Chanda Rubin in the third round. She paired with Australian Jeff Coetzee but lost to Mark Knowles and Elena Likhovtseva in two tight sets in the first round. In the singles event of the Dubai Tennis Championships, Kuznetsova won the first round against sixth seeded Francesca Schiavone, but was beaten by Dinara Safina in the second round. In the doubles event she and Navratilova were beaten by eventual runners-up María Vento-Kabchi and Angelique Widjaja. She did not reach the quarterfinals of any tournament during the first half of the year. Her win over world No. 11, Anastasia Myskina, in the second round of the Indian Wells Open in California was her highest up to that date.

In the first round of the French Open, Kuznetsova lost to Meghann Shaughnessy. She was also unsuccessful with Jared Palmer in the mixed doubles, losing to Nadia Petrova and Paul Haarhuis in the round of 16. Kuznetsova paired with Navratilova in the doubles match, but lost to Kim Clijsters and Ai Sugiyama in three sets in the quarterfinal. Kuznetsova participated at Wimbledon, where in the fourth round, she defeated wildcard Maria Sharapova to reach her first Grand Slam quarterfinal, losing to third seed Justine Henin. At the doubles, they were again defeated by Clijsters and Sugiyama. Kuznetsova paired with Australian Todd Woodbridge in the mixed doubles, but lost against Leoš Friedl and Liezel Huber in the quarterfinal. She then made her first semifinal appearance of the year in San Diego, before losing to Henin. At the US Open singles tournament, Kuznetsova lost in the third round to top seed Kim Clijsters. However, in the doubles competition, she again partnered with Navratilova and reached the first Grand Slam final of her career but were beaten by Paola Suárez and Virginia Ruano Pascual in two straight sets. She entered the Sparkassen Cup in Leipzig, losing to fifth seeded Daniela Hantuchová in the first round. Kuznetsova and Navratilova won the doubles title against Elena Likhovtseva and Nadia Petrova. In the doubles competition at the Kremlin Cup, they reached the semifinals before losing to Russian couple and runners-up Anastasia Myskina and Vera Zvonareva. Her last appearance of the year was at the WTA Championships doubles competition in Los Angeles. In her first Tour Championships participation she and Navratilova lost in the first round to eventual champions Virginia Ruano Pascual and Paola Suárez. She finished the 2003 season as world No. 36.

=== 2004: US Open title ===
Kuznetsova reached the third round of the singles competition at the Australian Open, before losing to top seed Justine Henin. She reached her second major doubles final with new partner Elena Likhovtseva before losing to Virginia Ruano Pascual and Paola Suárez. Several weeks later, playing singles at Dubai, Kuznetsova defeated former world No. 1, Venus Williams, in the quarterfinals before defeating world No. 8, Ai Sugiyama, in the semifinals for her first win over a top-10 player. Kuznetsova lost the final to world No. 1 Henin. The following week, Kuznetsova defeated Henin for the first time in the semifinals of Doha, before losing in the final to compatriot Myskina in three sets, pushing her into the top 20 for the first time. In April, Kuznetsova reached her third singles final of the year at the start of the clay-court season at the J&S Cup in Warsaw, losing to Venus Williams in the final. Kuznetsova climbed to No. 11 by the time of the French Open. There, she reached the fourth round before losing to eventual champion Myskina, after holding a match point in the third set. In doubles Kuznetsova and Likhovtseva reached the final, losing to Suarez and Ruano Pascual. Following the French Open, Kuznetsova climbed to career-highs of world No. 9 in the singles rankings, her first time in the top ten, and on 7 June 2004, world No. 3 in the doubles rankings. Kuznetsova won her third title at the Eastbourne International, defeating Hantuchová in the final in three sets. At Wimbledon, Kuznetsova suffered a first-round loss to 118th–ranked Virginie Razzano. She fell to No. 4 in the doubles on 26 July, losing in the LA Women's Tennis Championships to 113th ranked Gisela Dulko and Patricia Tarabini.

Representing Russia at the Olympics, Kuznetsova reached the quarterfinals before losing to silver-medallist Amélie Mauresmo. She went into the US Open seeded ninth. There, she defeated 14th seed Petrova in the quarterfinals, and in her first Grand Slam tournament semifinal, defeated fifth seed and former champion Davenport, ending the American's 22-match winning streak. In the final, Kuznetsova defeated sixth seed Dementieva. Kuznetsova was the first female Russian to win the US Open and the third to win a Grand Slam singles title, following the successes of Myskina and Maria Sharapova earlier in the year. Meanwhile, Kuznetsova teamed with Likhovtseva to reach the final of the doubles tournament before losing there to Suarez and Ruano Pascual, marking Kuznetsova's fourth consecutive defeat by the pair in Grand Slams. Kuznetsova, however, climbed again to No. 3 on 13 September, after her loss in Los Angeles in early July. Kuznetsova continued her success by winning the Wismilak International in Bali, Indonesia defeating Marlene Weingärtner in the final. In the doubles she reached with Arantxa-Sánchez Vicario the final, losing to Anastasia Myskina and Ai Sugiyama. This improved her singles ranking to a new high of world No. 5, but worsen her doubles ranking to No. 4 on 20 September. The following week, at the China Open in Beijing, Kuznetsova defeated Wimbledon champion Sharapova in the semifinals to extend her winning streak to 14 matches. However, she lost in the final to Serena Williams. Making her debut at the season-ending WTA Championships in Los Angeles, Kuznetsova lost two of three matches in the preliminary round-robin stage and exited before the semifinals. Kuznetsova finished the season as world No. 5.

=== 2005: Out of the top 10 ===
Kuznetsova began the year by reaching the quarterfinals of the Australian Open, losing to fourth seed Sharapova in three sets. Kuznetsova teamed with Australian Alicia Molik to win her first Grand Slam doubles title, defeating Davenport and Corina Morariu. In the first round she received a bye at the Pan Pacific Open and was defeated by runner-up Lindsay Davenport in the semifinal. Kuznetsova did not reach any finals during the spring hard-court season, with defeats including one to No. 97 Sania Mirza in the first round at Dubai. She received a first-round bye at the Indian Wells Open and reached the quarterfinal before losing to Elena Dementieva. She joined the next event, the NASDAQ-100 Open in Miami, and progressed to the fourth round after receiving a bye in the first round. There she was defeated by Ana Ivanovic.

She made her first final of the year at the J&S Cup in Warsaw, defeating former world No. 1 Clijsters in the semifinals. In the final, Kuznetsova lost to Henin. At the French Open, Kuznetsova lost again to eventual champion Henin in a tightly contested fourth round match, having wasted a match point in the third set. At Wimbledon, Kuznetsova reached the quarterfinals for the second time before losing to top seed Davenport. She teamed up with Mauresmo to reach her sixth Grand Slam doubles final but suffered a heavy defeat by Cara Black and Liezel Huber.

At the US Open, she lost to No. 97 Ekaterina Bychkova in the first round, becoming the first female defending US Open champion to lose in the first round. This defeat dropped her out of the top ten. She defeated Zvonareva in the quarterfinal of the Kremlin Cup but was beaten by Francesca Schiavone in the semifinal. At the Zurich Open, Kuznetsova lost in the first round to the unseeded Nathalie Dechy. She finished the year ranked world No. 18.

=== 2006: Return to form ===
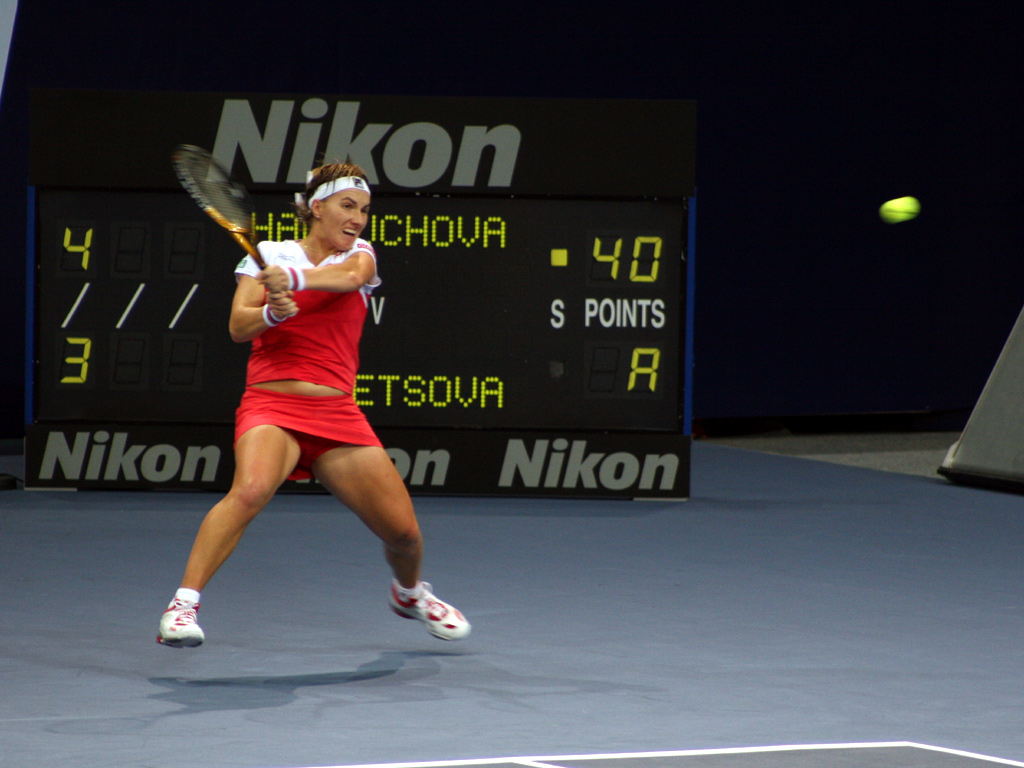
Kuznetsova at the Zurich Open, 2006

Kuznetsova started her season at the Australian Open and reached the fourth round before losing there to top seed Davenport. Several weeks later, Kuznetsova rebounded at Dubai, defeating world No. 2 Mauresmo in the quarterfinals for her first win over a top ten player since 2004. She lost to Henin in the semifinals. In March, Kuznetsova defeated former world No. 1, Martina Hingis, in the third round of the Miami Open, before going on to defeat world No. 1 Mauresmo in the semifinals. In the final, she defeated Sharapova to win the first Tier I title of her career and her first singles title in 18 months. This win returned her to the top ten.

Kuznetsova reached her second final of the year at the clay-court J&S Cup in Warsaw, defeating Venus Williams en route. In the final, she lost to world No. 2, Clijsters, marking third consecutive runner-up finish at that event. At the French Open, Kuznetsova reached the quarterfinals for the first time, where she defeated 14th seed Dinara Safina. In the semifinals, she defeated 17-year-old Czech Nicole Vaidišová after saving a match point. In her second Grand Slam final, Kuznetsova lost to Henin. Kuznetsova reached only the third round at Wimbledon, losing to 27th seed Li Na.

At the US Open, Kuznetsova lost in the fourth round to 19th seed Jelena Janković. In September, she won her second title of the year at the $225,000 Commonwealth Bank Tennis Classic in Bali as the top seeded – for the first time in her career – defeating Davenport in the semifinals and Marion Bartoli in the final. The following week, she won the China Open in Beijing, after defeating world No. 1 Mauresmo in the final.

Competing at the season-ending Tour Championships, played in Madrid, for the second time Kuznetsova again failed to advance past the preliminary round-robin stage, winning just one of her three matches. She finished the season as world No. 4.

=== 2007: Continued success, world No. 2 ===
Kuznetsova began the year by losing in the fourth round of the Australian Open to 16th seed Israeli Shahar Pe'er. She rebounded to reach her first final of the year in February at the Qatar Open in Doha, losing to world No. 1 Henin in two sets. She was seed first and made the final of the Tier I Indian Wells Open but lost to Hantuchová, in straight sets. Reaching the final improved her ranking to third during the week ending 18 March, a career high.

Kuznetsova continued on form during the clay-court season. At the J&S Cup in Warsaw, she defeated Venus Williams for the first time in her career in the quarterfinals before losing to Alona Bondarenko in the semifinals. She made the final of another Tier I tournament, at the German Open in Berlin, after defeating world No. 1 Henin for only the second time in the semifinals. In the final, the 1st seeded Kuznetsova lost to 12th seeded Ana Ivanovic. The following week, Kuznetsova reached the final of the Tier I Italian Open in Rome, losing to third seed Janković. As the third seed at the French Open, Kuznetsova advanced to the quarterfinals without dropping a set but lost there to runner-up Ivanovic. Kuznetsova reached the quarterfinals of Wimbledon for the third time in which she lost to eventual champion Venus Williams.

In August, the top-seeded Kuznetsova won her first title of the year at New Haven, after three of her opponents retired due to injury or illness, including her finals opponent Ágnes Szávay. At the US Open, Kuznetsova defeated sixth seed Anna Chakvetadze in the semifinals to advance to her third Grand Slam final. She lost to Henin in straight sets. As a result of this run, Kuznetsova reached world No. 2 during the week ending 9 September.

At the Porsche Tennis Grand Prix in Stuttgart, Germany, Kuznetsova recorded her first career win over Serena Williams, before losing in the semifinals to Tatiana Golovin. The following week she was seeded first in the Kremlin Cup in Moscow, but lost to Serena Williams in the semifinals. Kuznetsova completed the year by competing at the Year-ending championships in Madrid, but once again failed to progress beyond the preliminary round-robin stage, losing all three matches. She finished the season as world No. 2, and as the highest-ranked Russian player for the first time.

=== 2008: Steady ranking ===
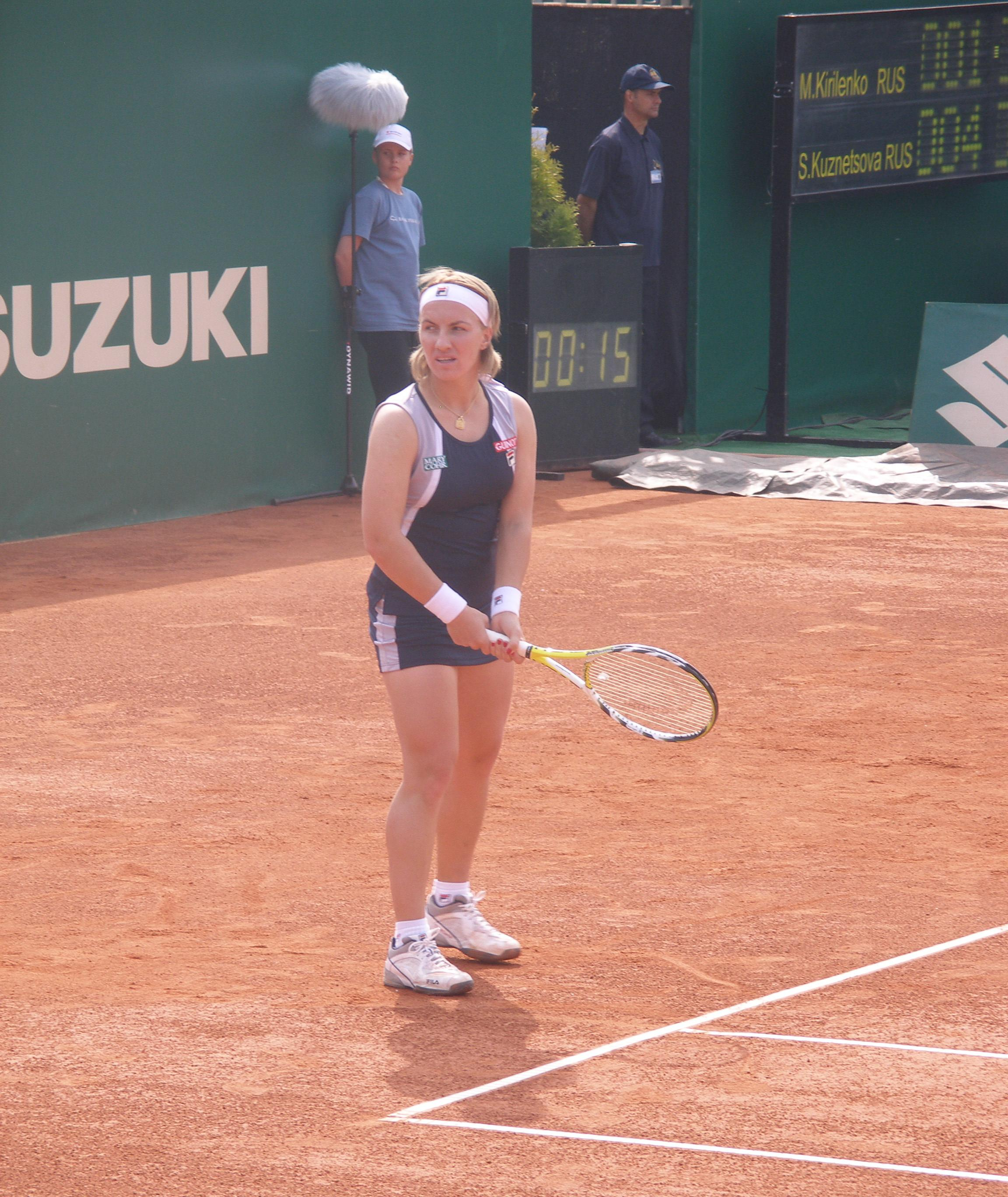
Kuznetsova at the 2008 Warsaw Masters

Kuznetsova began the season by reaching the final at the Sydney International, losing to world No. 1 Henin in the final set. At the Australian Open, Kuznetsova was seeded second, but fell in the third round to 29th seed Agnieszka Radwańska. After her defeat at the Qatar Ladies Open to 15th seeded Sybille Bammer, she fell after 15 weeks to No. 3 on 25 February. Kuznetsova made her second final of the season in Dubai, defeating former world No. 1, Mauresmo, in the quarterfinals and world No. 4, Janković, in the semifinals. In the final Kuznetsova lost to Elena Dementieva. At the Tier I Indian Wells Open, Kuznetsova defeated Radwańska in the quarterfinals, before defeating Australian Open champion Sharapova. In the final, Kuznetsova lost to top-seeded Ivanović. This marked her eighth defeat in her nine most recent final appearances. At the Tier I Miami Open the next fortnight, Kuznetsova defeated Venus Williams in the quarterfinals but then lost to her sister Serena in the semifinals.

Kuznetsova's form dipped following the conclusion of the spring hardcourt season, as she won just three of five matches on clay leading up to the French Open. She advanced to the semifinals without dropping a set, but then lost to Safina. At Wimbledon, Kuznetsova lost in the fourth round to Agnieszka Radwańska, after leading by a break in the third and final set.

In the summer, she competed at the Beijing Olympics, losing to local favorite Li Na in the first round. Seeded third in the US Open, she fell to Katarina Srebotnik in the third round in three sets. After the latter loss, she dropped out of the top five in the world rankings for the first time in two years. The following week, Kuznetsova made her first final since March at the Tier I Pan Pacific Open in Tokyo, defeating world No. 2 Janković in the quarterfinals, before losing to Safina in the final. The following week, Kuznetsova reached the final at the China Open in Beijing, but lost to Janković. This marked Kuznetsova's 10th defeat in her last eleven finals.

She mirrored her earlier performance at the season-ending WTA Championships in Doha, losing all three of her matches. Kuznetsova finished the year ranked No. 8, the only woman in the top ten not to have won a title that year.

=== 2009: French Open title ===
At the Australian Open, Kuznetsova reached the quarterfinals for the second time in her career, but lost to eventual champion Serena Williams, after being within two points of winning the match in the second set. After that, Kuznetsova did not win another match for nearly two months. She broke her losing streak in Miami reaching the semifinals, losing to Victoria Azarenka.

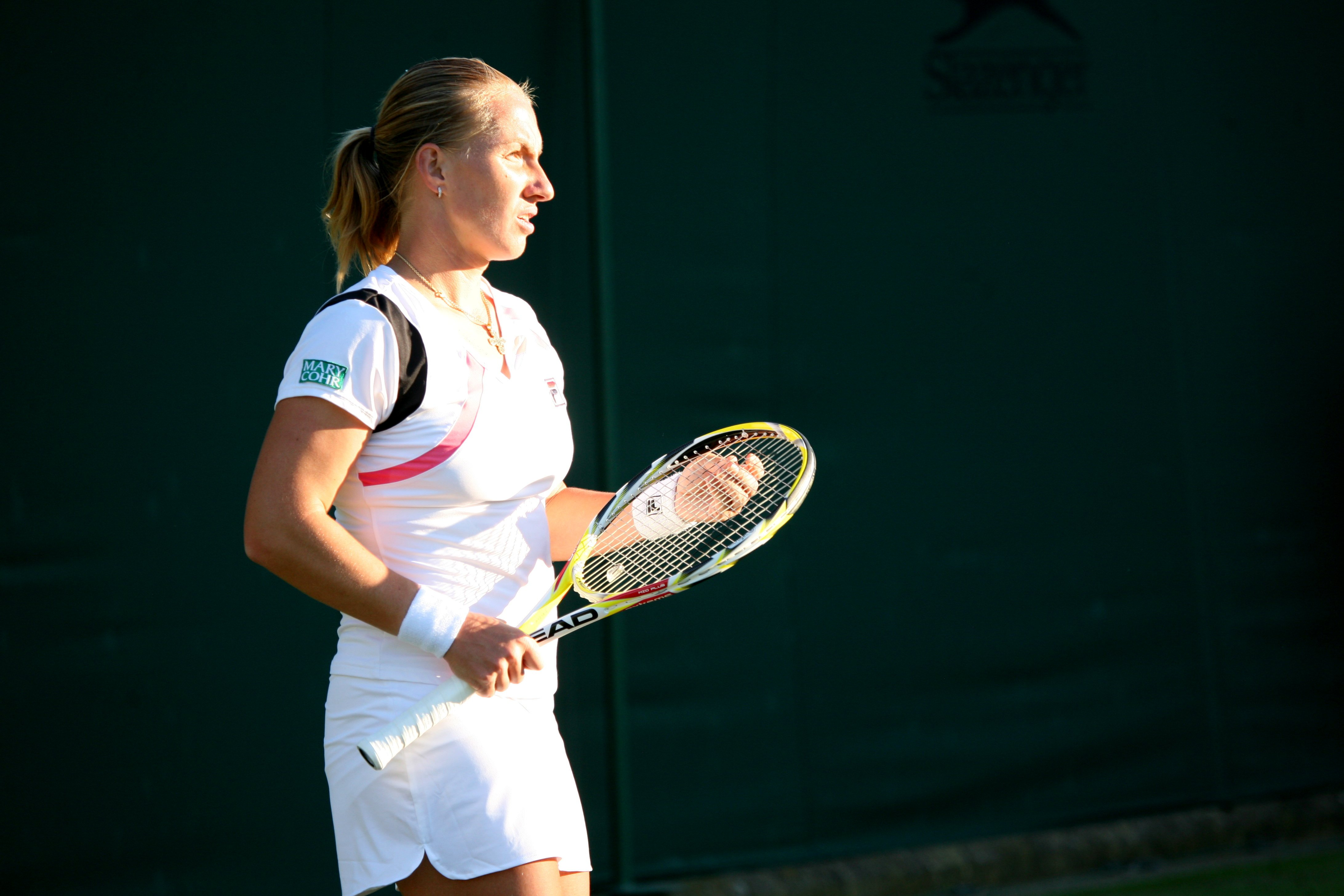
Kuznetsova at the 2009 Wimbledon Championships

At the Porsche Grand Prix, Kuznetsova defeated world No. 3 Dementieva in the semifinals to reach her first final that year. She defeated world No. 1 Safina to win her first singles title since August 2007. The following week, Kuznetsova also reached the final at the Premier 5 Internazionali d'Italia in Rome, having defeated No. 4 Janković en route. She lost the championship to Safina. In the quarterfinals of the French Open, she defeated Serena Williams in three sets, before defeating Samantha Stosur to reach her fourth major final. There she beat top seed Safina to win her second Grand Slam title. At Wimbledon, Kuznetsova fell in the third round to unseeded German Sabine Lisicki.

She pulled out of the LA Women's Tennis Championships, citing a foot injury. Her next event was the Cincinnati Open, where she fell to Clijsters in the third round. She then played in the Rogers Cup and lost to Samantha Stosur in the second round. She received a wildcard entrance to the Pilot Pen Tennis tournament in New Haven, but lost in the quarterfinals to Mauresmo. This became her last tournament as first seeded. At the US Open she won in straight set wins over Görges, Sevastova, and Peer, but lost against Caroline Wozniacki in the fourth round. At the Pan Pacific Open in Tokyo, seeded fifth, she lost to Andrea Petkovic.

A week later, she played at China Open as the sixth seed. She advanced to the final beating Petrova in the semifinal and won against Agnieszka Radwańska in the final. Soon after, she played at the Tour Championships in Doha. She entered the Maroon group along with Dementieva, Serena and Venus Williams, and lost both her matches against the Williams sisters. She defeated Dementieva, breaking her eight–match losing streak at the Championships. Kuznetsova ended the year ranked No. 3.

=== 2010–11: Struggles with form ===
Kuznetsova began the year at the Sydney International. She defeated Alisa Kleybanova in the first round before falling to Dominika Cibulková in the second. Kuznetsova was seeded third for the Australian Open. She advanced to the fourth round, losing to 19th seeded Petrova. Following the tournament, Kuznetsova's ranking dropped to world No. 4. Kuznetsova was seeded second for the Dubai Championships but fell in a third round upset to qualifier and No. 99 ranked Regina Kulikova. At the Billie Jean King Cup exhibition, Kuznetsova lost her match to Williams. For the first as the top seed, due to Serena Williams and Safina's withdrawal at Indian Wells, she was upset by Carla Suárez Navarro in the second round after receiving a first round bye. Kuznetsova was seeded, for the sixth and last time to date, top at the Miami Open and after receiving a bye in the first round, managed to prevent another upset by defeating Peng Shuai in the second round. She then defeated 27th seed Ágnes Szávay to book a fourth round encounter with Marion Bartoli, losing to the French No. 1 in the quarterfinal.

Kuznetsova was the defending champion at the Porsche Grand Prix, but fell to Li Na in the second round, after defeating Srebotnik. At the Italian Open, where she had reached the final the year before, she lost in the second round to Maria Kirilenko, after receiving a first round bye. As the defending champion at the French Open, Kuznetsova was the sixth seed. She defeated Sorana Cîrstea and Andrea Petkovic in the early rounds. In the third round she lost to 30th seeded Kirilenko. Kuznetsova advanced to the quarterfinals of the Eastbourne International, losing to Ekaterina Makarova. Kuznetsova was seeded 19th at the Wimbledon. She defeated Akgul Amanmuradova in the first round, before falling to Anastasia Rodionova in the second round.

Kuznetsova rallied by winning the San Diego Open. She defeated Yanina Wickmayer, Sara Errani, CoCo Vandeweghe, and Flavia Pennetta en route to the final which she won in three sets against Agnieszka Radwańska. She then played at the Cincinnati Open suffering an early exit to Sharapova in the first round. At the Rogers Cup, Kuznetsova made it to the semifinals before falling to Caroline Wozniacki in two sets. Kuznetsova was seeded 11th at the US Open. She defeated Kimiko Date-Krumm, Anastasija Sevastova, and 23rd seed Kirilenko before falling in the fourth round to unseeded Cibulková. Kuznetsova was the 10th seed at the Pan Pacific Open, but lost to Petkovic in the second round.

As the defending champion, Kuznetsova exited in the first round of the China Open to Roberta Vinci. She finished the year ranked world No. 27, her lowest since 2003.

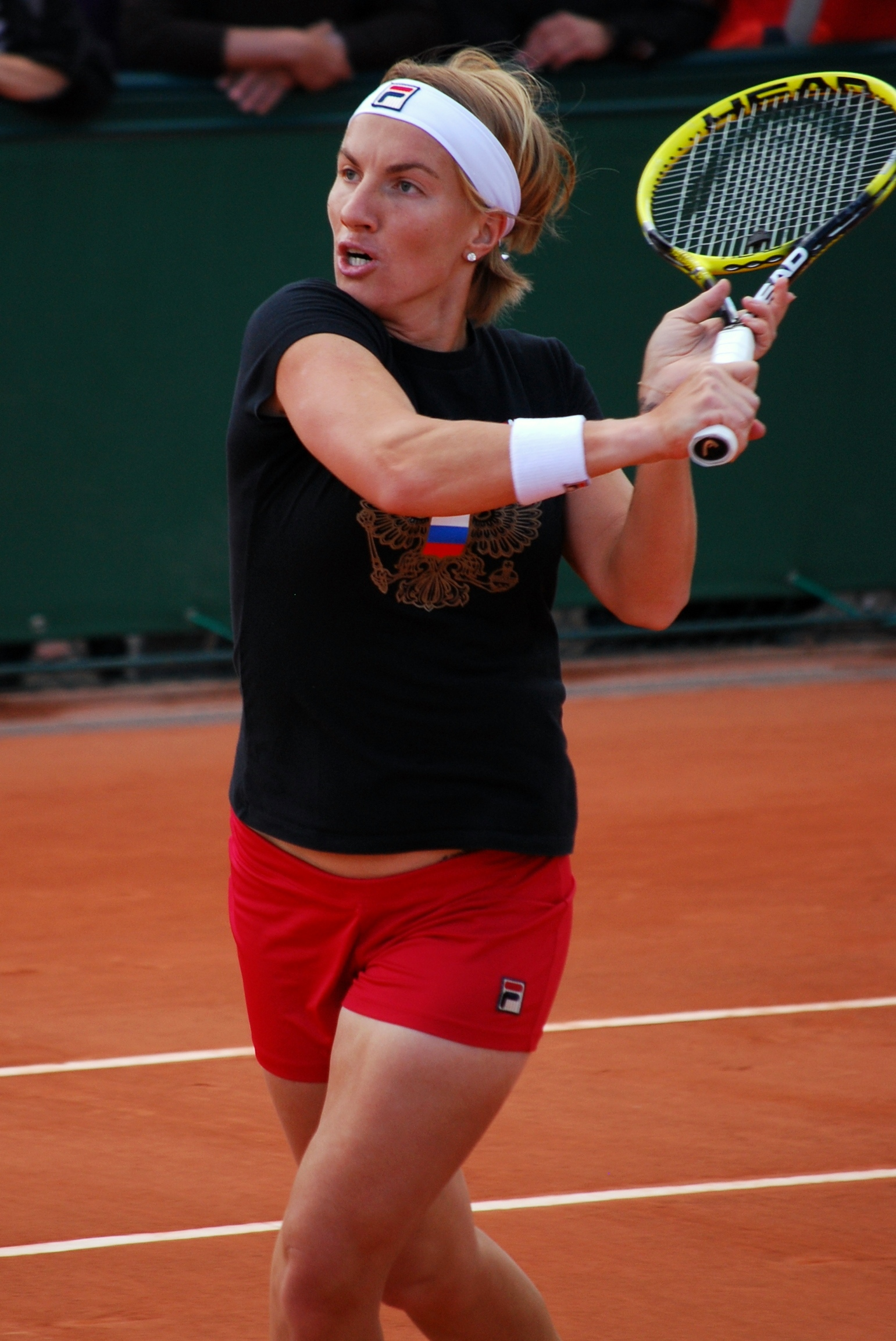
Svetlana Kuznetsova at Roland Garros

Kuznetsova's first tournament of 2011 was the Auckland Open in New Zealand where she was the third seed. She fell to Peng Shuai in the second round, although initially up a set. She then headed to Sydney where she lost in the quarterfinals to eight-seeded Li. Kuznetsova was seeded 23rd at the Australian Open where she lost in the fourth round to Francesca Schiavone, squandering six match points in the final set. The match was the longest recorded women's Grand Slam match in the Open Era, with a final scoreline of 6–4, 1–6, 16–14, and the second-longest women's match in the Open Era. Her next tournament was the Dubai Tennis Championships. The 16th seed set up a date in the final with Caroline Wozniacki by beating Flavia Pennetta in the semifinal. Kuznetsova was defeated by the top-seed. In doubles, she teamed up with Vera Zvonareva, but pulled out before the semifinal against Liezel Huber and María José Martínez Sánchez due to a right elbow injury of Zvonareva. She lost in the Qatar Ladies Open tournament against Shahar Pe'er in the first round. Kuznetsova received a bye in the first round at the Indian Wells Open, but was defeated by wildcard Christina McHale in two tie-breaks in the second round. At the doubles event, Kuznetsova teamed up with Vera Zvonareva. They received a wildcard in the first round, but were defeated by fourth seed Vania King and Shvedova. In the singles tournament of Miami, Kuznetsova was 11th-seeded and lost in the third round to Peng Shuai in straight sets. In the doubles tournament, again with Zvonareva and receiving a wildcard entry, they exited in the second round against María José Martínez Sánchez and Anabel Medina Garrigues.

Kuznetsova was seeded second at the Andalucia Tennis Experience, after receiving a wildcard. She succeeded to move to the semifinal where she lost against qualifier Irina-Camelia Begu. She failed to reach the second round in both the Madrid Open and Italian Open, losing to Dominika Cibulková and Gréta Arn, respectively. In Madrid, she partnered with Zvonareva and received a wildcard. They moved into the second round, but lost against King and Shvedova. Kuznetsova was seeded 13th at the French Open singles event where she lost against Marion Bartoli in the quarterfinal, her first in a Grand Slam tournament since 2009. At the doubles event she paired with Zvonareva and defeated unseeded Klaudia Jans and Alicja Rosolska from Poland. They lost against third seeds King and Shvedova. She lost against Dominika Cibulková in the quarterfinal of the Rosmalen Open. At Wimbledon, she defeated Zhang Shuai and Alexandra Dulgheru but lost against Yanina Wickmayer.

Kuznetsova was the defending champion at the San Diego Open but withdrew due to a groin strain. She recovered quickly from the injury and entered the Rogers Cup, but lost to Simona Halep in the first round. As 14th-seed, she made it to the third round of the Western & Southern Open and was beaten by eventual champion Maria Sharapova. Kuznetsova reached the fourth round of the US Open in which she lost to top-seeded Wozniacki.

=== 2012: Injuries and out of top 50 ===
Kuznetsova began her season at Auckland where she reached the semifinal, losing in three sets to Chinese Zheng Jie. At the Australian Open, she was defeated in the third round of the singles event by Sabine Lisicki. In contrast, she partnered with Vera Zvonareva as in the previous season and won her second Grand Slam doubles title against the Italian duo Errani and Vinci, defeating them in a three sets final. It was her best doubles result since 2009. It was the first time since 2008 that an unseeded pair won the Australian Open doubles title.

Kuznetsova was seeded 26th at the French Open. She upset world No. 3, Agnieszka Radwańska, in the third round but subsequently lost in the fourth to eventual runner-up, Sara Errani.

Kuznetsova then suffered a first-round loss at Wimbledon, falling to Yanina Wickmayer in straight sets. It was the first time she lost in the first round of any Grand Slam since the 2005 US Open where she was the defending champion. She withdrew from the US Open, ending a streak of 40 consecutive Grand Slam appearances dating back to 2002.

=== 2013: Comeback from injury, return to form ===
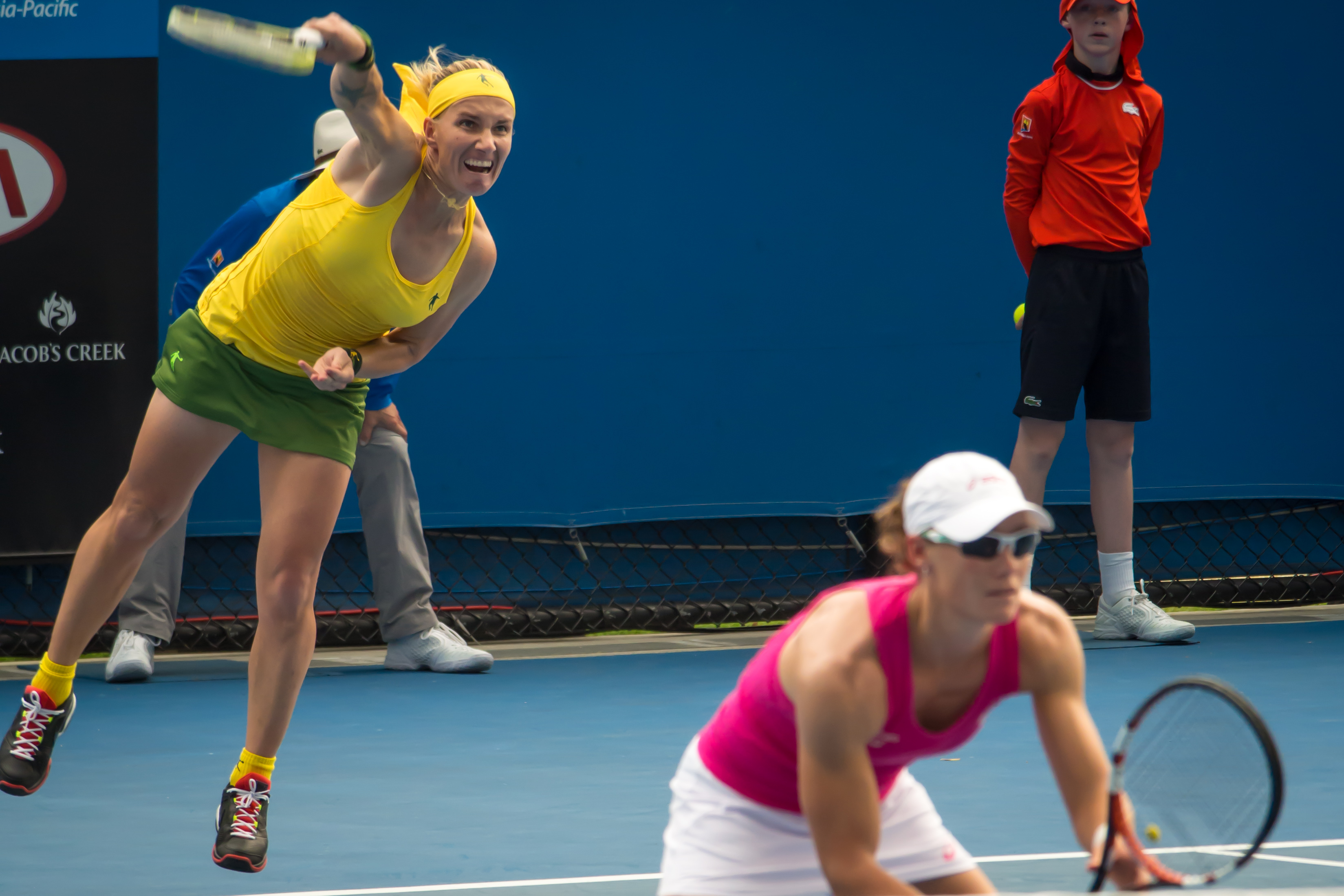
Playing doubles with Sam Stosur at the 2014 Australian Open

Kuznetsova began her comeback at Sydney, where she had to qualify to enter the main draw. In the second round, she upset former world No. 1, Caroline Wozniacki, in three sets for her first win in a main draw of any tournament since the previous year's French Open.

Kuznetsova entered the Australian Open unseeded, but she was able to reach the quarterfinals for the third time, after defeating Wozniacki for the second time this year, in the fourth round. She subsequently lost in the quarterfinals to world No. 1, defending and eventual champion, Victoria Azarenka, in two sets. She next played at the Qatar Ladies Open and defeated ninth seed Marion Bartoli in the second round, before losing in the third to Sam Stosur.

Kuznetsova then entered Indian Wells as an unseeded player. She matched her 2012 performance by reaching the third round, defeating former champion Janković in the second round, before losing to Marion Bartoli in the third. At Miami, Kuznetsova was again unseeded, but she managed to reach the third round, losing to Ana Ivanovic in straight sets.

At the French Open, Kuznetsova reached her second consecutive Grand Slam quarterfinal, where she lost to world No. 1 and eventual champion, Serena Williams, in three sets. The second set which Kuznetsova won was the only one dropped by Williams during the tournament. She had defeated 22nd-seed and compatriot Ekaterina Makarova and sixth seed Angelique Kerber en route.

=== 2014: Steady ranking, first WTA Tour title since 2010 ===
Kuznetsova began the year with a loss to Varvara Lepchenko in the first round at Sydney. At the first round of the Pattaya Open, Kuznetsova defeated Zhang Shuai to record her 500th career victory. This immediately followed a first round loss to Elina Svitolina at the Australian Open. Kuznetsova lost to Petra Kvitová in three sets in the third round at the Indian Wells Open. At Miami, Kuznetsova was upset in her first match by 17-year-old Croat Donna Vekić in straight sets, after receiving a first-round bye.

Kuznetsova reached the quarterfinals at the Stuttgart Grand Prix, before she was defeated by eventual finalist Ivanović. In the following competition, the seventh-seed Russian was finalist at the Portugal Open, losing to Carla Suárez Navarro in tough three sets. This was her first single final in more than three years.

In Roland Garros, Kuznetsova repeated her success in the previous year, climbing to the quarterfinals, before that defeating fifth-seeded Wimbledon champion Petra Kvitová in the third round. The injured Kuznetsova was helpless against finalist Simona Halep, who defeated her in straight sets.

Kuznetsova was upset in the first round of the Wimbledon Championships by Michelle Larcher de Brito in three sets.

Winning her first WTA Tour title in almost four years, Kuznetsova outlasted Kurumi Nara to claim the Washington Open. Seeded sixth in the tournament, the Russian broke unseeded Nara in the final game to win her fourteenth career title.

=== 2015: First Premier Mandatory final since Beijing 2009 ===
Kuznetsova failed to win a match in Auckland and Sydney, losing to qualifier Lucie Hradecká and Madison Keys in the first rounds, respectively. She lost her opening match again at Melbourne, losing to Caroline Garcia.

Kuznetsova scored her first win of the year at the Fed Cup, where she defeated world No. 8, Agnieszka Radwańska. However, Kuznetsova's hardcourt season was disappointing, with her biggest win against 15th-ranked Angelique Kerber in Miami.

She started the clay-court season at the WTA International tournament Prague Open, where she lost to 98th-ranked Zhang Shuai, but renewed herself at the Madrid Open, where she reached her 35th final. Kuznetsova had wins over Ekaterina Makarova, Garbiñe Muguruza, Sam Stosur and Lucie Šafářová, and then defeated Maria Sharapova in two sets. She lost to Petra Kvitová in the final in straight sets. Kuznetsova reached the second round of Roland Garros, losing there to long-time rival Francesca Schiavone in three tricky sets, 7–6, 5–7, 8–10. It was the third-longest women's match in the history of the French Open, lasting 3 hours and 50 minutes. This loss resulted to her exit from the top 20, losing ten ranking positions.

Kuznetsova played a steady grass season, with a win–loss of 6–3, the second-best result judged by wins in her career on grass. She reached the second round of Wimbledon for the first time since 2011. Kuznetsova withdrew from most of the North America tournaments, including the Rogers Cup and Cincinnati, due to a left leg injury. At the US Open, she lost in the first round to Kristina Mladenovic. Kuznetsova renewed herself in Guangzhou, reaching the quarterfinals. She eventually received her first trophy this season at the Kremlin Cup with a straight sets victory over Anastasia Pavlyuchenkova in the final, becoming the 15th title in her career.

=== 2016: Miami final; return to the top 10, and WTA Finals semifis ===
Svetlana repeated her season start. In Auckland, she reached the second round where she was knocked out by Tamira Paszek. She then triumphed in Sydney, defeating top-seeded Halep in the semifinals in three tight sets, and qualifier Monica Puig from Puerto Rico in the finals in two sets.

At the Australian Open, seeded No. 23, she reached the second round, where she lost surprisingly to returning Kateryna Bondarenko from Ukraine.

Seeded eighth at Dubai, Kuznetsova suffered a shocking demolition by Julia Görges in the first round. Kuznetsova then traveled to Doha for the Qatar Ladies Open. She was seeded 12th and was drawn to face Julia Görges in the first round for consecutive tournaments. However, this time Svetlana won in straight sets but lost out to Jeļena Ostapenko in the second round.

At Indian Wells, Svetlana was seeded 16th and received a bye into the second round. However, she suffered a loss to CoCo Vandeweghe. Kuznetsova then reached her second Miami Open final of her career. There she beat Carina Witthöft, Caroline Garcia, Serena Williams, Ekaterina Makarova and Timea Bacsinszky, all, except Bacsinszky, in three tight sets. The last time Kuznetsova defeated a world No. 1 player was at the 2009 Roland Garros final. She also stopped the American's 20-match winning streak. However, Kuznetsova missed her chance to return to the Top 10 for the first time since 2009 when she lost to Victoria Azarenka in the final.

Kuznetsova reached the quarterfinals of the Italian Open, where she suffered a clear loss by Serena Williams. As a result, she jumped four ranking positions, to No. 15. On 15 April, Kuznetsova replaced Sharapova from the top position among Russian players, the first time since 2011.

The Russian reached the fourth round in singles at the French Open, losing to eventual champion Garbiñe Muguruza. In doubles, she partnered with Margarita Gasparyan to reach the semifinals. This became her best Grand Slam doubles result since 2012 Australian Open, and her best French Open doubles result since 2004. By reaching the fourth round of the Wimbledon, where she lost to Serena Williams, she ensured herself a place in the top ten for the first time since 2010. Then at the Rogers Cup, the Russian reached the quarterfinal where she was beaten by Halep.

Kuznetsova qualified to the 2016 Summer Olympics in singles and doubles. In doubles she should have partnered with Gasparyan, but the young tennis player cited her injury; she was replaced by Daria Kasatkina. Kuznetsova reached the third round in singles and the quarterfinal in doubles. She again reached the quarterfinal in a Premier 5 tournament, doing so in Cincinnati. At the US Open, Kuznetsova suffered a disappointing loss against resurgent Caroline Wozniacki despite leading 4–0 in the first set.

Kuznetsova rebounded at the Wuhan Open, reaching the semifinals which boosted her hopes to qualify for the WTA Finals for the first time since 2009. This run included defeating defending champion Venus Williams and Agnieszka Radwańska, after saving match point. She then lost to fellow Singapore contender Dominika Cibulková in a tight three set match. At the China Open, Kuznetsova received a bye into the second round due to her impressive performance at Wuhan. She defeated Misaki Doi but lost to yet another Singapore Contender Madison Keys in the third round. Being the favourite for the title in Tianjin after top seed Agnieszka Radwańska withdrew from her quarterfinal match, Kuznetsova disappointingly lost to Alison Riske in the semifinals. This would have kept her out of Singapore, until Serena Williams withdrew from Singapore and that left a spot up to grabs.

As the defending champion, Kuznetsova took a wildcard into the Kremlin Cup, knowing that she had to win the title to qualify for Singapore. Kuznetsova handled the pressure well; defeating Alizé Cornet, Tímea Babos, Elina Svitolina and Daria Gavrilova in the final to win the title. This win automatically took the place in the last spot at WTA Finals for the first time since 2009 and also meant that Kuznetsova managed to successfully defend a title for the first time in her career, she replaced Johanna Konta as the potential last qualifier spot. In the WTA Finals, she defeated Radwańska and Pliskova in three sets, before losing to Garbiñe Muguruza to top her group. She then lost to eventual champion, Dominika Cibulková.

=== 2017: Indian Wells final, steady top-10 ranking in mid-season ===
Kuznetsova as fifth seeded started well at the Brisbane International, reaching the quarterfinals but losing there to Muguruza. She lost in the second round of the Sydney Open to Anastasia Pavlyuchenkova in two straight sets. At the Australian Open, she got into the fourth round, her best result there since 2013, but lost again to Pavlyuchenkova in two straight sets.

Her disappointing season continued at the St. Petersburg Ladies' Trophy as she crashed out in her first quarterfinal of the year against Yulia Putintseva, the eventual finalist. Kuznetsova then skipped both the Dubai and the Qatar Ladies Open due to an injury.

Her first tournament back from the injury, she won her opening round match at the Indian Wells Open against Johanna Larsson, before following it up with impressive victories over Roberta Vinci, Caroline Garcia, taking revenge for her two losses this year against Anastasia Pavlyuchenkova and then earned an excellent victory over the in-form Karolína Plíšková to reach her first final at Indian Wells since 2008 – she ultimately ended up losing to compatriot Elena Vesnina in three sets. She then lost to Venus Williams in the fourth round at the Miami event.

Kuznetsova's first clay-court event of the year came at the Porsche Tennis Grand Prix where she was the eighth seed and the title favourite. However, she failed to capitalize on her chances as she fell to eventual champion local wildcard Laura Siegemund, who eventually went on to unexpectedly clinch the title. She then reached the semifinals of the Madrid Open, losing to Mladenovic. As a result, she climbed to the eighth world ranking position. However, after a disappointing performance in Rome, Kuznetsova returned to the ninth position. At the French Open, Kuznetsova defended her points as she went to the fourth round, losing there to Wozniacki.

The results from the grass-court season were one of the best in Kuznetsova's career, producing a win–loss record of 6–2, repeating the 2005 record. She reached the quarterfinals of Eastbourne, losing to Pliskova in three sets. She then improved her performance at Wimbledon, defeating Ons Jabeur, Ekaterina Makarova, Polona Hercog and No. 10 Agnieszka Radwańska on her way to reach the quarterfinals, where she fell to eventual champion Garbiñe Muguruza. She was once again beaten by Muguruza in Cincinnati, but now in three tight sets.

By the end of the season, Kuznetsova showed low results due to her hand injury, twice losing in the second round in a total of three tournaments, after receiving a bye. She withdrew from the Kremlin Cup, where she was the two-times defending champion. On 23 October, she fell out of the top-10 and dropped to the 11th position, ending her 65 weeks streak in the top 10.

=== 2018: Decline and comeback in Washington DC ===
Kuznetsova continued her poor performance on court. She reached a quarterfinal only once in an International event in Istanbul. Even at Roland Garros, where she has been traditionally playing well, Kuznetsova lost in the first round to world No. 3 Garbiñe Muguruza. After her first-round loss in Wimbledon, Kuznetsova pulled out of the top 100. However, she rebounded herself winning the Washington Open defeating Donna Vekić in three sets. By that, she extended her tournament's record to 11–0. Furthermore, she returned to the top 100 after this success; however, after her loss at Cincinnati, she dropped just outside the top 100. She finished the season ranked 107, her worst ranking since 2001.

=== 2019: Comeback after injury ===
After half a year off battling injury, Kuznetsova made a comeback at the Ladies Open Lugano, reaching the quarterfinals. One of her best results in the European swing a win over world No. 10, Aryna Sabalenka, at the Madrid Open.

Kuznetsova could not defend her title at the Washington Open, after she was granted a visa too late, although she applied in February. This led to her losing 90 ranking positions, from 108 to 198. In the U.S. swing, Kuznetsova reached the third round of the Rogers Cup, losing to Simona Halep in straight sets. Ranked 153 and earning a wild card, Kuznetsova reached the final at the following Western & Southern Open, defeating 11th seeded Anastasija Sevastova, Dayana Yastremska, eighth seeded Sloane Stephens, third seeded Karolína Plíšková and top-seeded Ashleigh Barty. She was defeated by Madison Keys. As a result, Kuznetsova went from No. 153 to No. 62 in the world ranking.

At the US Open, she was stunned in the first round by Kristie Ahn. She successfully qualified at Wuhan, defeating wildcard Zheng Qinwen and Bethanie Mattek-Sands, and defeated Yulia Putintseva and Hsieh Su-wei, before falling in the third round to Elina Svitolina. At Beijing, Kuznetsova was defeated by Christina McHale in the first round in three sets. Kuznetsova's final event of the year was at Moscow, where she was defeated in the first round by eventual semifinalist Karolína Muchová. She ended the year ranked No. 54.

=== 2020: Return to form ===
At Hobart, Kuznetsova lost in two sets to Magda Linette in the first round. She then participated in the Australian Open for the first time in three years, where she defeated Markéta Vondroušová in the first round, before falling to Camila Giorgi. At St. Petersburg, she defeated Jennifer Brady before losing to Belinda Bencic. At Doha, she defeated Çağla Büyükakçay and Iga Świątek, received a walkover from Amanda Anisimova and then avenged her St. Petersburg defeat against Bencic in straight sets to reach the semifinals for her first top-ten victory of the year. She lost to eventual champion Aryna Sabalenka in the semifinals. Despite the loss, her ranking rose to No. 32 in the world, and she was due to be seeded for the first time in years at Indian Wells, before the tournament was cancelled due to the COVID-19 pandemic.

Upon the resumption of the tour, Kuznetsova opted to skip the US Open Series due to pandemic concerns. She made her return at the İstanbul Cup as the top seed, but was stunned by Eugenie Bouchard in her first match. Her first wins came at the Italian Open, including an upset over 14th seed Anett Kontaveit. She lost to Elina Svitolina in the third round. Her last tournament of the year was the French Open where she lost to compatriot Anastasia Pavlyuchenkova in the first round.

=== 2021–24: Injury struggles, early end of season, three years hiatus ===
Kuznetsova began her season at the Grampians Trophy after going through a 14-day hard quarantine. She lost to Jennifer Brady in the first round despite leading by an early break. After defeating Barbora Strýcová in the first round of the Australian Open, Kuznetsova lost to Belinda Bencic in a tight match, after leading by a break in the deciding set.

During the Middle East swing, Kuznetsova lost in the first round of the Qatar Ladies Open to Victoria Azarenka but managed to reach the third round of Dubai with three-set wins over Wang Qiang and world No. 5, Elina Svitolina, for her first top-ten win of the year.

She then reached her first semifinal of the year at her home tournament, the St. Petersburg Ladies' Trophy. She survived a scare against teenage rising star Wang Xinyu in her opener before producing a comeback against Jaqueline Cristian in the quarterfinals. However, she lost to Daria Kasatkina in the semifinals, after leading by a set.

It was the start of a five-match losing streak as Kuznetsova lost in the first round of the Miami Open to Alizé Cornet, and her only clay-court tournament was at the French Open where she lost to Azarenka. She then lost in the first round of the Wimbledon Championships to qualifier Lesley Pattinama Kerkhove.

Due to injury concerns, Kuznetsova gave up her spot from the Olympics for another compatriot. She ended her season prematurely due to lingering injuries, with her comeback date not disclosed. She fell out of the top 100 in September 2021 after being inactive.

== Rivalries ==
=== Kuznetsova vs. Henin ===
Belgian tennis legend Justine Henin was one of Kuznetsova's leading rivals during the middle portion of her career. Of the 19 matches that they played, Kuznetsova earned three victories, including their final one. Henin won their first meeting in the 2003 Wimbledon Quarterfinal when Kuznetsova, just 17, lost in straight sets. Kuznetsova earned her first win over the Belgian at the semifinals of the 2004 Total Qatar Open, where she went on to lose in the final to Anastasia Myskina. This result projected the Russian into the world's top 20 players for the first time. Arguably their finest match followed in the fourth round of the 2005 French Open, where Henin saved two match points en route to a three set victory. Henin went on to win the tournament, defending her title a year later by beating Kuznetsova in the 2006 final. Henin additionally defeated Kuznetsova in the finals of the 2007 US Open grand slam tournament in straight sets. Kuznetsova beat Henin for the second time in the semifinals of the 2007 Qatar Telecom German Open tournament in Berlin in three sets, becoming the second-to-last person to do so in 2007. The Belgian went on a seven-month, 32-match winning streak after Wimbledon, having lifted the French Open directly beforehand. Henin unexpectedly retired in 2008, but returned to the tour briefly in 2010, only to suffer an elbow tear at Wimbledon. Justine Henin made one final comeback following her injury at the 2011 Australian Open, where Kuznetsova defeated her in a dramatic match in the third round. Due to the recurring nature of her elbow injury, Henin retired immediately following her match with Kuznetsova, making the Russian the final person to play against and defeat her.

=== Kuznetsova vs. Radwańska ===
Kuznetsova and Agnieszka Radwańska played each other eighteen times between 2007 and 2017, with Kuznetsova leading the head-to-head 14–4. Their first meeting was at Wimbledon in 2007 with Kuznetsova winning in straight sets. Kuznetsova won their first three meetings, but in the four meetings that eventuated in 2008, Kuznetsova lost three of them, including in the third round of the Australian Open and in the fourth round of Wimbledon. Additionally, she also lost against her at the year-end championships later in the year, after Radwańska replaced an injured Ana Ivanovic. Kuznetsova subsequently dominated Radwańska in future meetings, winning six meetings between the pair between 2009 and 2012, including an upset victory at the 2012 French Open, until Radwańska stopped the rot at the 2014 Mutua Madrid Open, saving a match point in the process. Prior to 2014, Kuznetsova's two most recent titles came by defeating Radwańska in the championship match, first at Beijing in 2009 and then at San Diego in 2010. In 2015, Kuznetsova defeated Radwańska again in the opening match of Fed Cup tie between Russia and Poland. At the 2016 Wuhan Open, Kuznetsova saved a match point in the second set en route to winning a three-set, quarterfinal thriller, and also saved a match point when they met at the WTA Finals in Singapore later that year. Their most recent and final meeting, at the 2017 Wimbledon Championships, saw Kuznetsova win in straight sets, a decade on from their first meeting.

=== Kuznetsova vs. Ivanovic ===
Kuznetsova and Ana Ivanovic played each other fourteen times between 2005 and 2015 inclusive. Kuznetsova struggled for most of the rivalry, losing eight of the eleven meetings between the pair. Kuznetsova's only victory in the main tour came in the quarterfinals of the 2006 Sydney International; her other two wins over Ivanovic came in the 2010 and 2012 Fed Cups. They met in two finals, with Kuznetsova losing both: first in Berlin in 2007 and at Indian Wells in 2008, the latter of which they contested as the top two seeds. Additionally, at the 2007 WTA Tour Championships, Kuznetsova lost to Ivanovic in three sets on the Serb's 20th birthday. Their last meeting was in the third round of the 2015 China Open with Kuznetsova losing in three sets.

== Fed Cup participation ==
Kuznetsova joined team Russia in 2004 in the doubles and singles competition. Her teammates were Myskina and Zvonareva in singles and Likhovtseva in doubles. They competed against Australia in the first round in the Luzhniki Stadium in an indoor carpet court. Kuznetsova defeated Molik and Molik/Rennae Stubbs. The result was 4–1 for Russia; Myskina lost to Molik. In the quarterfinal they faced Argentina in Buenos Aires. Kuznetsova lost to Gisela Dulko. In the doubles she defeated Dulko and partner Patricia Tarabini. The final score was the same as in the first round, 4–1. In the semifinal they faced Austria. Again in Moscow, Kuznetsova defeated Yvonne Meusburger, Daniela Kix and Meusburger and Patricia Wartusch all in straight sets. The final score was a straight 5–0. In the final they faced France only three days after the semifinal. Kuznetsova beat Dechy, but lost to Tatiana Golovin. Russia won the final 3–2 for its first Fed Cup victory.

Kuznetsova did not participate in the next two years. She rejoined in 2007 and defeated Spain's Lourdes Domínguez Lino and Anabel Medina Garrigues in the quarterfinal. She was elected in the final that year. There, she won against Mara Santangelo and Schiavone from Italy. Russia again won that year's Cup.

The next year she again participated. Playing against the United States she defeated 282nd-ranked Ahsha Rolle in the semifinal. In contrast, Kuznetsova lost the doubles competition with partner Elena Vesnina, beaten by Liezel Huber and Vania King. In the end, Russia defeated the US 3–2. In the final, Russia defeated Spain as it had the prior year. Kuznetsova won against Carla Suárez Navarro and Garrigues. Team Russia won the 2008 Fed Cup with 4–0.

In 2009 Kuznetsova joined the group again. She played against China in the quarterfinal and won in the singles over opponent Yan Zi, and in the doubles, together with Dementieva, over Sun Tiantian and Yan Zi, after losing the first set. Russia won against China in a straight 5–0 final scoreline. Russia lost to Italy in the semifinal. Kuznetsova was the only winner, defeating Pennetta.

At the 2010 Fed Cup, Russia defeated Serbia in the quarterfinal 3–2. There, Kuznetsova won two of three matches, beating Ivanović, and Ivanović and Janković in doubles, with partner Kleybanova. She lost to Janković.

Kuznetsova joined the Russian team in 2011. In the first round they faced France on 5 and 6 February. In the first round, Kuznetsova was defeated by Alizé Cornet, but defeated Virginie Razzano a day later. She teamed up with Anastasia Pavlyuchenkova and defeated Cornet/Julie Coin in the doubles. Russia became just the fourth nation to come back from 0–2 down in a Fed Cup tie since the best-of-five-match format was introduced to the World Group in 1995. Russia defeated Italy in the semifinal in 5–0. There, Svetlana Kuznetsova defeated Roberta Vinci. Russia succeeded, the first time since 2008, in a final in the Fed Cup. Russia, however, lost against Czech Republic in 3–2.

The first round of the 2012 Fed Cup saw three wins in the single competition, two of which were made by Kuznetsova, the first against Sílvia Soler Espinosa, the second against Carla Suárez Navarro. The pair Kuznetsova/Petrova retired in their last match due to Kuznetsova's fatigue, but Russia still won in 3–2. Team Russia lost against the Serbian team in the semifinal, 2–3. Although winning the first match against Ana Ivanovic in three sets, Kuznetsova was later defeated by Jelena Janković in two straight sets.

After a two-years break in the Fed Cup, Kuznetsova participated at the 2015 Fed Cup, where team Russia played against Poland in the Round Robin. With her win over Agnieszka Radwańska in three sets, Kuznetsova beat a top-10 player in the Fed Cup for the first time. In the semifinals against Germany she played two rubbers, one was won against Julia Görges, another against Andrea Petkovic. With her win over Görges, Kuznetsova became the second-best Russian Fed Cup player by total wins, with 27 won rubbers; the absolute leader is Larisa Savchenko, with 40 won rubbers. Kuznetsova was not called in the final.

Kuznetsova at the 2016 Fed Cup lost in four hours against Richèl Hogenkamp in the first day, becoming the longest Fed Cup singles match in the history.

== Coaches ==
Kuznetsova received training at the Sanchez-Casal Academy in Barcelona, Spain from the age of 14 and was coached under direction of club president Emilio Sánchez and Sergio Casal. Her major coaching relationship was with Stefan Ortega who was a regular guest in her player's box and helped advance her game.

After a series of poor finals' results Kuznetsova ended her relationship with the Sanchez-Casal academy in 2009 and moved to Moscow on the advice of Roger Federer to start training with experienced Russian coach Olga Morozova. They ended their relationship after the BNP Paribas Open in March 2009, after which Kuznetsova was without a coach. As of May 2009 her coach was former Russian tennis player and Fed Cup coach Larisa Neiland. She was coached for a short period by Loïc Courteau after trying unsuccessfully to convince Mauresmo to coach her. Her next coach was for a short time the former Spanish tennis player Carlos Cuadrado, until he was replaced with her former coach Neiland. After the loss in the Italian Open, Kuznetsova has switched to Morozova, then to Amos Mansdorf and finally in May 2012 to Argentine Hernán Gumy, former coach of Marat Safin. She said in an interview, that she likes working with him and understands with him well. With his help she won three matches in straight sets at the 2012 French Open, including claiming the scalp of then-world No. 3 Agnieszka Radwańska.

After a poor late 2012 season, Kuznetsova has switched between Gumy and Carlos Martínez; sometimes both serve as coaches. She was also coached by Javier Piles.

== Playing style ==
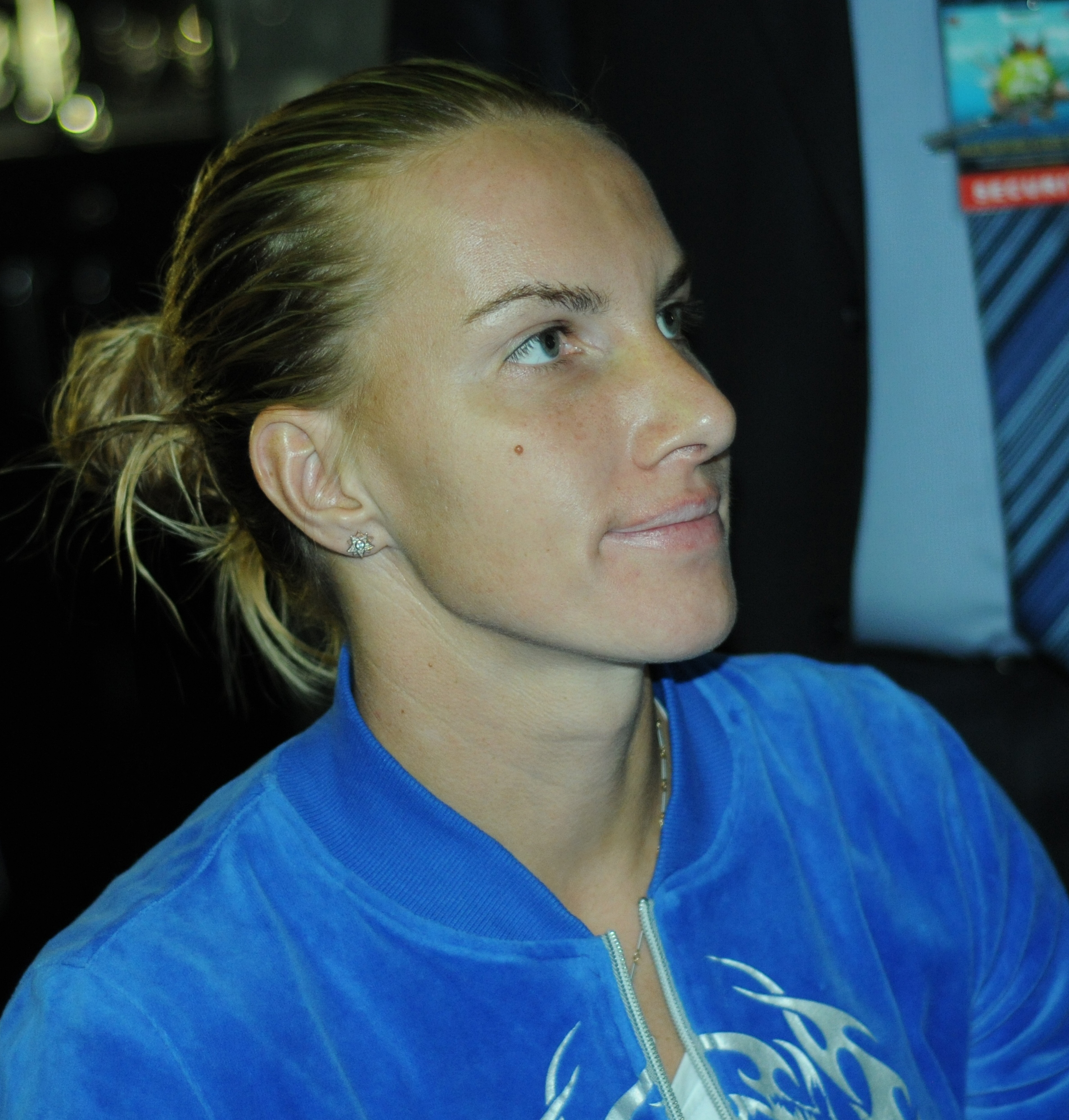
Svetlana Kuznetsova, 2014

Svetlana Kuznetsova plays right-handed and has a two-handed backhand. She is an all-round player. She has been described as technically the most complete player on tour. She is noted for her great speed on court and her strong forehand with much topspin. She is capable of producing effective volley winners providing an agile touch. According to Richard Pagliaro of ESPN, "Kuznetsova can alter the spin, speed and height of her shots and owns the variety that plays well on clay" but since her recent failures, "consistency has eluded her, and she's prone to flakiness and frustration under pressure." Jeff Cooper of about.com meant her greatest strengths were the "outstandingly powerful and accurate forehand. Strong topspin on forehand and backhand. Solid serve. Great speed" and outlined her basic style as "power baseliner" with "no major weakness". She is known for her unpredictability and inconsistency.

== Endorsements and popular culture ==
Kuznetsova extended her long standing endorsement agreements with the sport brand Fila on 13 January 2012. She debuted with the new apparel at the 2012 Australian Open alongside fellow Fila player Kim Clijsters. According to chairman Gene Yoon, "Both players are longtime members of the Fila family and have played an important role in Fila's rich history in tennis." However that contract was not extended beyond 2012. Subsequently, shortly before the start of the 2013 Australian Open, Kuznetsova signed a new apparel endorsement deal with Chinese sports apparel brand Qiaodan. Svetlana Kuznetsova appeared in video games Top Spin 2, Top Spin 3, Virtua Tennis 2009 and Virtua Tennis 4 as a playable character.

== Career statistics ==
=== Grand Slam tournament performance timelines ===
Key
W	F	SF	QF	#R	RR	Q#	DNQ	A	NH

(W) winner; (F) finalist; (SF) semifinalist; (QF) quarterfinalist; (#R) rounds 4, 3, 2, 1; (RR) round-robin stage; (Q#) qualification round; (DNQ) did not qualify; (A) absent; (NH) not held; (SR) strike rate (events won / competed); (W–L) win–loss record.

==== Singles ====
Tournament	2002	2003	2004	2005	2006	2007	2008	2009	2010	2011	2012	2013	2014	2015	2016	2017	2018	2019	2020	2021	SR	W–L
Australian Open	2R	1R	3R	QF	4R	4R	3R	QF	4R	4R	3R	QF	1R	1R	2R	4R	A	A	2R	2R	0 / 18	37–18
French Open	Q2	1R	4R	4R	F	QF	SF	W	3R	QF	4R	QF	QF	2R	4R	4R	1R	1R	1R	1R	1 / 19	52–18
Wimbledon	Q2	QF	1R	QF	3R	QF	4R	3R	2R	3R	1R	A	1R	2R	4R	QF	1R	1R	NH	1R	0 / 17	30–17
US Open	3R	3R	W	1R	4R	F	3R	4R	4R	4R	A	3R	1R	1R	2R	2R	1R	1R	A	A	1 / 17	35–16
Win–Loss	3–2	6–4	12–3	11–4	14–4	17–4	12–4	16–3	9–4	12–4	5–3	10–3	4–4	2–4	8–4	11–4	0–3	0–3	1–2	1–3	2 / 71	154–69

=== Grand Slam tournament finals ===
==== Singles: 4 (2 titles, 2 runner-ups) ====
Result	Year	Tournament	Surface	Opponent	Score
Win	2004	US Open	Hard	(Russia) Elena Dementieva	6–3, 7–5
Loss	2006	French Open	Clay	(Belgium) Justine Henin	4–6, 4–6
Loss	2007	US Open	Hard	(Belgium) Justine Henin	1–6, 3–6
Win	2009	French Open	Clay	(Russia) Dinara Safina	6–4, 6–2

==== Doubles: 7 (2 titles, 5 runner-ups) ====
Result	Year	Tournament	Surface	Partner	Opponent	Score
Loss	2003	US Open	Hard	(United States) Martina Navratilova	(Spain) Virginia Ruano Pascual; (Argentina) Paola Suárez	2–6, 3–6
Loss	2004	Australian Open	Hard	(Russia) Elena Likhovtseva	(Spain) Virginia Ruano Pascual (Argentina) Paola Suárez	4–6, 3–6
Loss	2004	French Open	Clay	(Russia) Elena Likhovtseva	(Spain) Virginia Ruano Pascual (Argentina) Paola Suárez	0–6, 3–6
Loss	2004	US Open	Hard	(Russia) Elena Likhovtseva	(Spain) Virginia Ruano Pascual (Argentina) Paola Suárez	4–6, 5–7
Win	2005	Australian Open	Hard	(Australia) Alicia Molik	(United States) Lindsay Davenport; (United States) Corina Morariu	6–3, 6–4
Loss	2005	Wimbledon	Grass	(France) Amélie Mauresmo	(Zimbabwe) Cara Black; (South Africa) Liezel Huber	2–6, 1–6
Win	2012	Australian Open	Hard	(Russia) Vera Zvonareva	(Italy) Sara Errani; (Italy) Roberta Vinci	5–7, 6–4, 6–3

== Awards and nominations ==
2001

- Russian Cup (Newcomer of the Year)

2002

- WTA Awards – Most Impressive Newcomer (won)
- Russian Cup (Success of the Year)

2004

- Russian Cup (Team of the Year)

2005

- Laureus World Newcomer of the Year (nominated)
- Best Female Tennis Player ESPY Award (nominated)

2006

- WTA Awards – Diamond Aces (won)

2007

- Russian Cup (Team of the Year)

2008

- Russian Cup (Team of the Year)

2009

- Order of Merit for the Fatherland, 2nd class
- Best Female Tennis Player ESPY Award (nominated)

2016

- Russian Tennis Hall of Fame (Best Contemporary Tennis Player)
- Russian Cup (Best Tennis Player)

== Records ==
- These records were attained in the Open Era of tennis.

Tournament	Year	Record accomplished	Players matched
Australian Open	2011		
Australian Open	2011	Longest women's match in a major in the Open Era by time played (4 hours, 44 minutes)	Francesca Schiavone
Australian Open	2011	Second-longest women's match in the Open Era	Francesca Schiavone
Fed Cup	2016	Longest Fed Cup women's singles match by time played (4 hours)	Richèl Hogenkamp
WTA Finals	2016	Second most three-set matches won in the 21st century (22 matches won in one season)	Petra Kvitová (2013; 25); Anastasia Myskina (2002); Ai Sugiyama (2003; both 22)

== See also ==
- Performance timelines for all female tennis players since 1978 who reached at least one Grand Slam final
- List of Grand Slam women's singles champions

== Notes ==
Awards and achievements
Preceded by (Argentina) María Emilia Salerni	ITF Junior World Champion; 2001	Succeeded by (Czech Republic) Barbora Strýcová
Preceded by (Slovakia) Daniela Hantuchová	WTA Newcomer of the Year; 2002	Succeeded by (Russia) Maria Sharapova
