= Svetlana Kuznetsova career statistics =

Career finals
Discipline	Type	Won	Lost	Total	WR
Singles	Grand Slam	2	2	4	0.50
Singles	Summer Olympics	–	–	–	–
Singles	WTA Finals	–	–	–	–
Singles	WTA 1000	2	11	13	0.15
Singles	WTA 500 & 250	14	11	25	0.56
Singles	Total	18	24	42	0.43
Doubles	Grand Slam	2	5	7	0.29
Doubles	Summer Olympics	–	–	–	–
Doubles	WTA Finals	–	–	–	–
Doubles	WTA 1000	4	2	6	0.67
Doubles	WTA 500 & 250	10	8	18	0.56
Doubles	Total	16	15	31	0.52
Total		34	39	73	0.47

This is a list of the main career statistics of professional tennis player Svetlana Kuznetsova. Since her professional debut in 2000, she has won 18 singles titles and 16 doubles titles on the WTA Tour. Some of her major titles include two Grand Slam titles in singles (2004 US Open and 2009 French Open) and two in doubles (Australian Open in 2005 and 2012). During her career, she has made 62 top 10 wins, including seven wins over world No. 1 in that moment and earned more than $25M prize money. In singles, she reached career-highest ranking of place 2, while in doubles she is former world No. 3. Playing for Russia at the Billie Jean King Cup, she won three titles, in 2004, 2007 and 2008.

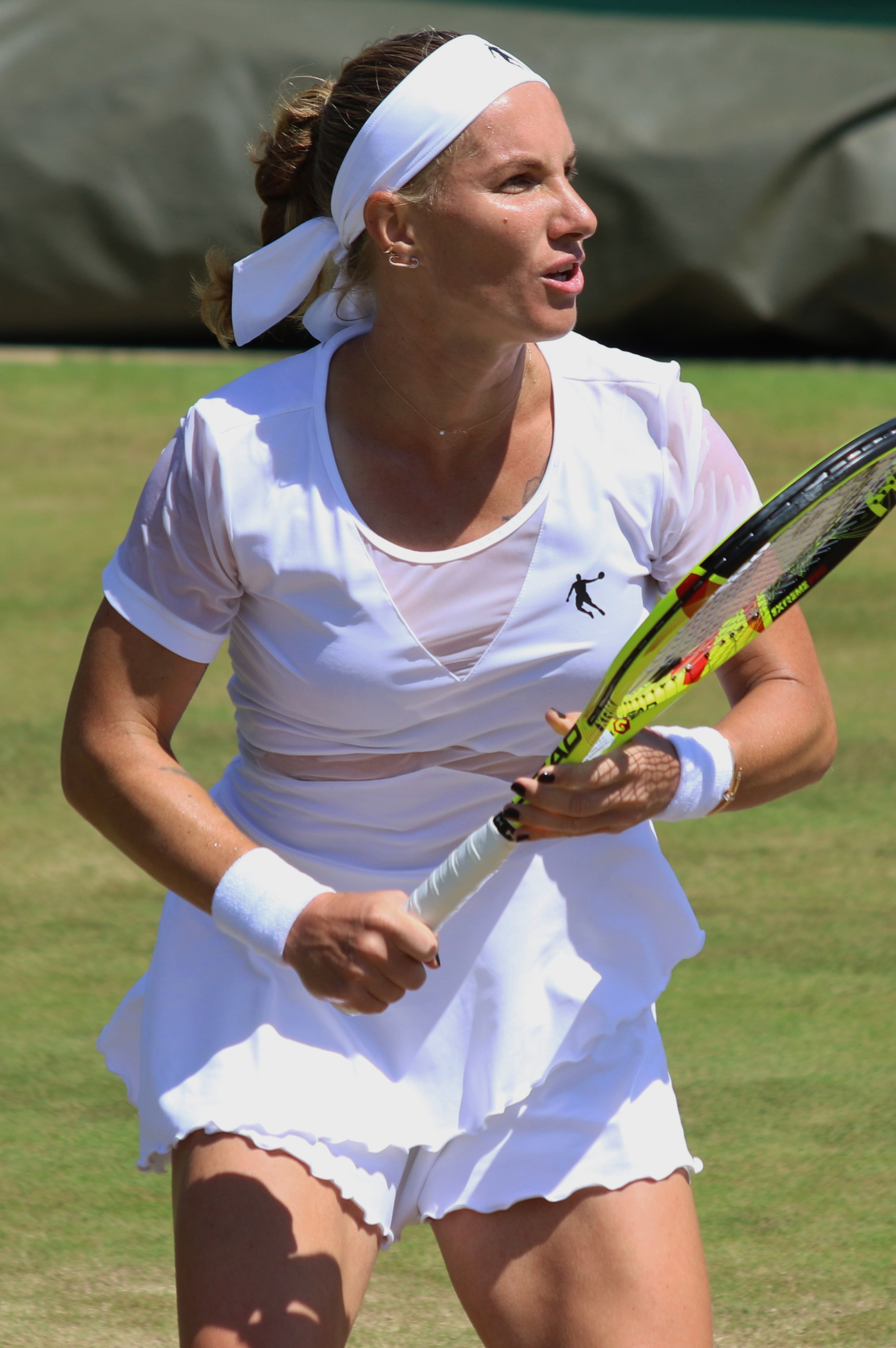
Kuznetsova at the 2017 Wimbledon Championships.

== Performance timelines ==
Key
W	F	SF	QF	#R	RR	Q#	P#	DNQ	A	Z#	PO	G	S	B	NMS	NTI	P	NH

(W) winner; (F) finalist; (SF) semifinalist; (QF) quarterfinalist; (#R) rounds 4, 3, 2, 1; (RR) round-robin stage; (Q#) qualification round; (P#) preliminary round; (DNQ) did not qualify; (A) absent; (Z#) Davis/Fed Cup Zonal Group (with number indication) or (PO) play-off; (G) gold, (S) silver or (B) bronze Olympic/Paralympic medal; (NMS) not a Masters tournament; (NTI) not a Tier I tournament; (P) postponed; (NH) not held; (SR) strike rate (events won / competed); (W–L) win–loss record.

=== Singles ===
Current through 2021 Wimbledon Championships.

Tournament	2001	2002	2003	2004	2005	2006	2007	2008	2009	2010	2011	2012	2013	2014	2015	2016	2017	2018	2019	2020	2021	SR	W–L	Win %
Grand Slam tournaments
Australian Open	A	2R	1R	3R	QF	4R	4R	3R	QF	4R	4R	3R	QF	1R	1R	2R	4R	A	A	2R	2R	0 / 18	37–18	67%
French Open	A	Q2	1R	4R	4R	F	QF	SF	W	3R	QF	4R	QF	QF	2R	4R	4R	1R	1R	1R	1R	1 / 19	52–18	74%
Wimbledon	A	Q2	QF	1R	QF	3R	QF	4R	3R	2R	3R	1R	A	1R	2R	4R	QF	1R	1R	NH	1R	0 / 17	30–17	64%
US Open	A	3R	3R	W	1R	4R	F	3R	4R	4R	4R	A	3R	1R	1R	2R	2R	1R	1R	A	A	1 / 17	35–16	69%
Win–loss	0–0	3–2	6–4	12–3	11–4	14–4	17–4	12–4	16–3	9–4	12–4	5–3	10–3	4–4	2–4	8–4	11–4	0–3	0–3	1–2	1–3	2 / 71	154–69	69%
National representation
Billie Jean King Cup (Note: Formerly known as Fed Cup until 2020.)	A	A	A	W	A	A	W	W	SF	SF	F	SF	A	A	F	QF	A	A	A	A (Note: Edition is split into the two years due to COVID-19.)		3 / 9	21–11	66%
Summer Olympics	NH			QF	NH			1R	NH			A	NH			3R	NH				A	0 / 3	5–3	63%
Year-end championships
WTA Finals	DNQ			RR	DNQ	RR	RR	RR	RR	DNQ						SF	DNQ			NH	DNQ	0 / 6	5–14	26%
WTA Elite Trophy	NH								A	DNQ					RR	A	A	DNQ		NH	DNQ	0 / 1	1–1	50%
WTA 1000 tournaments + former
Dubai / Qatar Open	NT1							3R	2R	3R	F	3R	3R	A	2R	2R	A	A	A	SF	3R	0 / 10	17–10	63%
Indian Wells Open	A	A	3R	QF	QF	A	F	F	2R	2R	2R	3R	3R	3R	3R	2R	F	2R	A	NH	A	0 / 15	28–15	65%
Miami Open	A	A	2R	4R	4R	W	4R	SF	SF	4R	3R	2R	3R	2R	4R	F	4R	2R	A	NH	1R	1 / 17	35–16	69%
Berlin / Madrid Open^{1}	A	A	2R	QF	QF	QF	F	3R	2R	1R	1R	1R	3R	2R	F	1R	SF	1R	2R	NH	A	0 / 17	26–17	54%
Italian Open	A	A	3R	QF	2R	SF	F	3R	F	2R	1R	1R	1R	2R	A	QF	3R	2R	A	3R	A	0 / 16	25–16	61%
Canadian Open	A	A	1R	A	3R	QF	QF	QF	2R	SF	1R	A	1R	1R	A	QF	2R	A	3R	NH	A	0 / 13	15–13	54%
Cincinnati Open	NH			NT1					3R	1R	3R	A	1R	3R	A	QF	QF	2R	F	A	A	0 / 8	13–8	62%
Pan Pacific / Wuhan Open	A	A	A	A	SF	A	A	F	2R	2R	A	A	QF	2R	1R	SF	2R	A	3R	NH		0 / 9	17–9	65%
China Open	NT1								W	1R	2R	A	2R	QF	3R	3R	1R	A	A	NH		1 / 8	13–7	65%
Charleston Open	A	A	A	A	A	QF	A	A	NT1													0 / 1	2–1	67%
San Diego Open	NT1			3R	3R	A	A	NH		NT1						NH						0 / 2	2–2	50%
Moscow Open	Q1	A	2R	QF	QF	2R	SF	QF	NT1													0 / 6	8–6	57%
Zurich Open	A	A	Q3	A	1R	SF	QF	NT1	NH													0 / 3	3–3	50%
Career statistics
	2001	2002	2003	2004	2005	2006	2007	2008	2009	2010	2011	2012	2013	2014	2015	2016	2017	2018	2019	2020	2021	Career		
Tournaments	2	11	16	22	17	22	19	19	18	17	19	12	18	19	20	22	17	14	13	7	9	Career total: 333		
Titles	0	2	0	3	0	3	1	0	3	1	0	0	0	1	1	2	0	1	0	0	0	Career total: 18		
Finals	0	2	0	7	1	5	6	5	4	1	1	0	0	2	2	3	1	1	1	0	0	Career total: 42		
Hard win–loss	1–1	10–4	14–10	40–14	11–9	37–11	34–14	31–16	24–11	20–11	23–15	11–7	21–14	15–11	16–12	33–17	17–11	7–5	9–6	5–4	5–6	14 / 211	384–209	65%
Clay win–loss	1–1	12–5	3–3	12–5	8–4	19–6	16–4	10–3	17–3	3–4	7–4	5–5	8–4	12–5	7–4	9–3	9–4	3–5	5–6	2–3	0–1	3 / 82	168–82	67%
Grass win–loss	—N/a	—N/a	4–1	4–1	6–2	4–2	4–1	3–2	2–2	3–2	4–2	0–1	0–0	0–1	5–3	3–2	6–2	1–3	0–1	0–0	0–2	1 / 31	49–30	62%
Carpet win–loss	—N/a	—N/a	1–2	3–3	4–2	0–1	1–1	0–0	Discontinued													0 / 9	9–9	50%
Overall win–loss	2–2	22–9	22–16	59–23	29–17	60–20	55–20	44–21	43–16	26–17	34–21	16–13	29–18	27–17	28–19	45–22	32–17	11–13	14–13	7–7	5–9	18 / 333	610–330	65%
Year-end ranking	259	43	36	5	18	4	2	8	3	27	19	72	21	28	25	9	12	107	54	36	107	$25,816,890		

=== Doubles ===
Current through the suspension of the 2020 WTA Tour.

Tournament	2001	2002	2003	2004	2005	2006	2007	2008	2009	2010	2011	2012	2013	2014	2015	2016	2017	2018	SR	W–L	Win %
Grand Slam tournaments
Australian Open	A	A	3R	F	W	3R	2R	2R	1R	3R	A	W	2R	2R	3R	3R	A	A	2 / 13	31–11	74%
French Open	A	A	3R	F	2R	A	A	A	A	A	2R	A	2R	1R	A	SF	3R	2R	0 / 9	17–9	65%
Wimbledon	A	1R	QF	QF	F	2R	QF	A	3R	2R	A	A	A	A	A	1R	QF	A	0 / 10	21–10	68%
US Open	A	2R	F	F	QF	A	A	A	A	A	A	A	2R	A	1R	A	A	A	0 / 6	15–6	71%
Win–loss	0–0	1–2	12–4	18–4	15–3	3–0	4–2	1–0	2–2	3–2	1–1	6–0	3–3	1–1	3–4	6–3	5–2	1–1	2 / 34	84–36	70%
National representation
Billie Jean King Cup	A	A	A	W	A	A	W	W	SF	SF	F	SF	A	A	F	QF	A	A	3 / 9	6–2	75%
Summer Olympics	NH			2R	NH			QF	NH			A	NH			QF	NH		0 / 3	5–3	63%
Year-end championships
WTA Finals	DNQ		SF	SF	DNQ														0 / 2	0–2	0%
WTA 1000 tournaments + former
Dubai / Qatar Open	NT1							A	A	2R	SF	A	A	A	A	A	A	A	0 / 1	3–1	75%
Indian Wells Open	A	A	2R	F	1R	A	A	2R	2R	A	1R	1R	1R	SF	2R	1R	QF	A	0 / 12	13–12	52%
Miami Open	A	A	SF	F	W	SF	2R	QF	W	1R	2R	2R	SF	1R	A	1R	QF	A	2 / 14	28–12	70%
Berlin / Madrid Open^{1}	A	A	QF	2R	A	A	QF	A	A	A	2R	1R	QF	2R	A	QF	1R	A	0 / 9	9–9	50%
Italian Open	A	A	W	A	A	A	A	A	A	A	A	A	1R	1R	A	1R	1R	2R	1 / 6	6–5	55%
Canadian Open	A	A	W	A	QF	A	QF	1R	2R	A	1R	A	1R	A	A	1R	A	A	1 / 8	7–7	50%
Cincinnati Open	not held			Tier III					A	A	2R	A	A	A	A	A	A	A	0 / 1	1–1	50%
Pan Pacific / Wuhan Open	A	A	A	A	A	A	A	A	1R	A	A	A	A	A	1R	2R	A	A	0 / 3	1–3	25%
China Open	Tier IV			Tier II					2R	A	A	A	1R	A	1R	A	A	A	0 / 3	1–3	25%
Kremlin Cup	QF	A	SF	1R	1R	QF	A	A	NT1										0 / 5	4–5	44%
Zurich Open	A	A	A	A	1R	1R	A	NT1	NH										0 / 2	0–2	0%
Career statistics
Tournaments	2	12	17	16	11	9	8	7	8	6	7	4	10	7	6	12	7	3	Career total: 152		
Titles	0	3	5	2	2	1	0	0	1	0	0	1	0	0	0	0	0	0	Career total: 15		
Finals	0	5	6	10	4	2	1	0	1	0	0	1	0	0	0	0	0	0	Career total: 30		
Hard win–loss	0–0	11–3	27–9	32–9	18–6	9–5	6–4	6–6	8–6	5–4	5–5	7–2	8–8	5–3	3–6	6–7	4–2	0–0	11 / 95	170–84	67%
Clay win–loss	1–1	14–5	9–2	5–2	1–1	0–1	2–1	0–0	0–0	0–0	2–2	0–1	3–3	1–3	0–0	6–3	2–3	2–2	3 / 33	48–30	62%
Grass win–loss	0–0	0–1	3–1	6–2	5–1	5–1	3–1	0–1	2–1	1–2	0–0	0–0	0–0	0–0	0–1	0–2	4–2	0–1	1 / 19	29–17	63%
Carpet win–loss	1–1	1–1	0–0	6–1	0–1	0–1	1–1	2–1	Did not continue										1 / 8	11–7	61%
Overall win–loss	2–2	23–9	43–11	44–14	23–8	15–6	14–5	6–6	10–6	6–5	7–6	7–3	7–10	5–7	3–7	12–12	10–7	2–3	16 / 155	239–127	65%
Year-end ranking	217	45	7	8	8	37	41	142	53	107	89	38	54	116	165	56	60	298			

== Grand Slam tournament finals ==
=== Singles: 4 (2 titles, 2 runner-ups) ===
Result	Year	Tournament	Surface	Opponent	Score
Win	2004	US Open	Hard	(Russia) Elena Dementieva	6–3, 7–5
Loss	2006	French Open	Clay	(Belgium) Justine Henin	4–6, 4–6
Loss	2007	US Open	Hard	(Belgium) Justine Henin	1–6, 3–6
Win	2009	French Open	Clay	(Russia) Dinara Safina	6–4, 6–2

=== Doubles: 7 (2 titles, 5 runner-ups) ===
Result	Year	Tournament	Surface	Partner	Opponents	Score
Loss	2003	US Open	Hard	(United States) Martina Navratilova	(Spain) Virginia Ruano Pascual (Argentina) Paola Suárez	2–6, 3–6
Loss	2004	Australian Open	Hard	(Russia) Elena Likhovtseva	(Spain) Virginia Ruano Pascual (Argentina) Paola Suárez	4–6, 3–6
Loss	2004	French Open	Clay	(Russia) Elena Likhovtseva	(Spain) Virginia Ruano Pascual (Argentina) Paola Suárez	0–6, 3–6
Loss	2004	US Open	Hard	(Russia) Elena Likhovtseva	(Spain) Virginia Ruano Pascual (Argentina) Paola Suárez	4–6, 5–7
Win	2005	Australian Open	Hard	(Australia) Alicia Molik	(United States) Lindsay Davenport (United States) Corina Morariu	6–3, 6–4
Loss	2005	Wimbledon	Grass	(France) Amélie Mauresmo	(Zimbabwe) Cara Black (South Africa) Liezel Huber	2–6, 1–6
Win	2012	Australian Open	Hard	(Russia) Vera Zvonareva	(Italy) Sara Errani (Italy) Roberta Vinci	5–7, 6–4, 6–3

== WTA 1000 tournaments ==
=== Singles: 13 (2 titles, 11 runners-up) ===
Result	Year	Tournament	Surface	Opponent	Score
Win	2006	Miami Open	Hard	(Russia) Maria Sharapova	6–4, 6–3
Loss	2007	Indian Wells Open	Hard	(Slovakia) Daniela Hantuchová	3–6, 4–6
Loss	2007	German Open	Clay	(Serbia) Ana Ivanovic	6–3, 4–6, 6–7^{(3–7)}
Loss	2007	Italian Open	Clay	(Serbia) Jelena Janković	5–7, 1–6
Loss	2008	Indian Wells Open	Hard	(Serbia) Ana Ivanovic	4–6, 3–6
Loss	2008	Pan Pacific Open	Hard	(Russia) Dinara Safina	1–6, 3–6
Loss	2009	Italian Open	Clay	(Russia) Dinara Safina	3–6, 2–6
Win	2009	China Open	Hard	(Poland) Agnieszka Radwańska	6–2, 6–4
Loss	2011	Dubai Championships	Hard	(Denmark) Caroline Wozniacki	1–6, 3–6
Loss	2015	Madrid Open	Clay	(Czech Republic) Petra Kvitová	1–6, 2–6
Loss	2016	Miami Open	Hard	(Belarus) Victoria Azarenka	3–6, 2–6
Loss	2017	Indian Wells Open	Hard	(Russia) Elena Vesnina	7–6^{(8–6)}, 5–7, 4–6
Loss	2019	Cincinnati Open	Hard	(United States) Madison Keys	5–7, 6–7^{(5–7)}

=== Doubles: 6 (4 titles, 2 runner-ups) ===
Result	Year	Tournament	Surface	Partner	Opponents	Score
Win	2003	Italian Open	Clay	(United States) Martina Navratilova	(Serbia and Montenegro) Jelena Dokić; (Russia) Nadia Petrova	6–4, 5–7, 6–2
Win	2003	Canadian Open	Hard	(United States) Martina Navratilova	(Colombia) María Vento-Kabchi; (Indonesia) Angelique Widjaja	3–6, 6–1, 6–1
Loss	2004	Indian Wells Open	Hard	(Russia) Elena Likhovtseva	(Spain) Virginia Ruano Pascual; (Argentina) Paola Suárez	1–6, 2–6
Loss	2004	Miami Open	Hard	(Russia) Elena Likhovtseva	(Russia) Nadia Petrova (United States) Meghann Shaughnessy	2–6, 3–6
Win	2005	Miami Open	Hard	(Australia) Alicia Molik	(United States) Lisa Raymond; (Australia) Rennae Stubbs	7–5, 6–7^{(5–7)}, 6–2
Win	2009	Miami Open (2)	Hard	(France) Amélie Mauresmo	(Czech Republic) Květa Peschke (United States) Lisa Raymond	4–6, 6–3, [10–3]

== WTA career finals ==
=== Singles: 42 (18 titles, 24 runners–up) ===
Legend Grand Slam (2–2) Premier Mandatory & 5 (Tier I) (2–11) Premier (Tier II) (8–10) International (6–1)	Titles by surface Hard (14–15) Grass (1–0) Clay (3–9)

Result	W–L	Date	Tournament	Tier	Surface	Opponent	Score
Win	1–0	May 2002	Nordic Light Open, Finland	International	Clay	(Czech Republic) Denisa Chládková	0–6, 6–3, 7–6^{(7–2)}
Win	2–0	Sep 2002	Wismilak International, Indonesia	International	Hard	(Spain) Conchita Martínez	3–6, 7–6^{(7–4)}, 7–5
Loss	2–1	Feb 2004	Dubai Championships, UAE	Tier II	Hard	(Belgium) Justine Henin	6–7^{(3–7)}, 3–6
Loss	2–2	Mar 2004	Qatar Open, Qatar	Tier II	Hard	(Russia) Anastasia Myskina	6–4, 4–6, 4–6
Loss	2–3	May 2004	Warsaw Open, Poland	Tier II	Clay	(United States) Venus Williams	1–6, 4–6
Win	3–3	Jun 2004	Eastbourne International, UK	Tier II	Grass	(Slovakia) Daniela Hantuchová	2–6, 7–6^{(7–4)}, 6–4
Win	4–3	Sep 2004	US Open, United States	Grand Slam	Hard	(Russia) Elena Dementieva	6–3, 7–5
Win	5–3	Sep 2004	Wismilak International, Indonesia (2)	International	Hard	(Germany) Marlene Weingärtner	6–1, 6–4
Loss	5–4	Sep 2004	China Open, China	Tier II	Hard	(United States) Serena Williams	6–4, 5–7, 4–6
Loss	5–5	May 2005	Warsaw Open, Poland	Tier II	Clay	(Belgium) Justine Henin	6–3, 2–6, 5–7
Win	6–5	Apr 2006	Miami Open, United States	Tier I	Hard	(Russia) Maria Sharapova	6–4, 6–3
Loss	6–6	May 2006	Warsaw Open, Poland	Tier II	Clay	(Belgium) Kim Clijsters	5–7, 2–6
Loss	6–7	Jun 2006	French Open, France	Grand Slam	Clay	(Belgium) Justine Henin	4–6, 4–6
Win	7–7	Sep 2006	Wismilak International, Indonesia (3)	International	Hard	(France) Marion Bartoli	7–5, 6–2
Win	8–7	Sep 2006	China Open, China	Tier II	Hard	(France) Amélie Mauresmo	6–4, 6–0
Loss	8–8	Mar 2007	Qatar Open, Qatar	Tier II	Hard	(Belgium) Justine Henin	4–6, 2–6
Loss	8–9	Mar 2007	Indian Wells Open, United States	Tier I	Hard	(Slovakia) Daniela Hantuchová	3–6, 4–6
Loss	8–10	May 2007	German Open, Germany	Tier I	Clay	(Serbia) Ana Ivanovic	6–3, 4–6, 6–7^{(3–7)}
Loss	8–11	May 2007	Italian Open, Italy	Tier I	Clay	(Serbia) Jelena Janković	5–7, 1–6
Win	9–11	Aug 2007	Connecticut Open, United States	Tier II	Hard	(Hungary) Ágnes Szávay	4–6, 3–0 ret.
Loss	9–12	Sep 2007	US Open, United States	Grand Slam	Hard	(Belgium) Justine Henin	1–6, 3–6
Loss	9–13	Jan 2008	Sydney International, Australia	Tier II	Hard	(Belgium) Justine Henin	6–4, 2–6, 4–6
Loss	9–14	Mar 2008	Dubai Championships, UAE	Tier II	Hard	(Russia) Elena Dementieva	6–4, 3–6, 2–6
Loss	9–15	Mar 2008	Indian Wells Open, United States	Tier I	Hard	(Serbia) Ana Ivanovic	4–6, 3–6
Loss	9–16	Sep 2008	Pan Pacific Open, Japan	Tier I	Hard	(Russia) Dinara Safina	1–6, 3–6
Loss	9–17	Sep 2008	China Open, China	Tier II	Hard	(Serbia) Jelena Janković	3–6, 2–6
Win	10–17	May 2009	Stuttgart Open, Germany	Premier	Clay (i)	(Russia) Dinara Safina	6–4, 6–3
Loss	10–18	May 2009	Italian Open, Italy	Premier 5	Clay	(Russia) Dinara Safina	3–6, 2–6
Win	11–18	Jun 2009	French Open, France	Grand Slam	Clay	(Russia) Dinara Safina	6–4, 6–2
Win	12–18	Oct 2009	China Open, China (2)	Premier M	Hard	(Poland) Agnieszka Radwańska	6–2, 6–4
Win	13–18	Aug 2010	Southern California Open, U.S.	Premier	Hard	(Poland) Agnieszka Radwańska	6–4, 6–7^{(7–9)}, 6–3
Loss	13–19	Feb 2011	Dubai Championships, UAE	Premier 5	Hard	(Denmark) Caroline Wozniacki	1–6, 3–6
Loss	13–20	May 2014	Portugal Open, Portugal	International	Clay	(Spain) Carla Suárez Navarro	4–6, 6–3, 4–6
Win	14–20	Aug 2014	Washington Open, United States	International	Hard	(Japan) Kurumi Nara	6–3, 4–6, 6–4
Loss	14–21	May 2015	Madrid Open, Spain	Premier M	Clay	(Czech Republic) Petra Kvitová	1–6, 2–6
Win	15–21	Oct 2015	Kremlin Cup, Russia	Premier	Hard (i)	(Russia) Anastasia Pavlyuchenkova	6–2, 6–1
Win	16–21	Jan 2016	Sydney International, Australia	Premier	Hard	(Puerto Rico) Monica Puig	6–0, 6–2
Loss	16–22	Apr 2016	Miami Open, United States	Premier M	Hard	(Belarus) Victoria Azarenka	3–6, 2–6
Win	17–22	Oct 2016	Kremlin Cup, Russia (2)	Premier	Hard (i)	(Australia) Daria Gavrilova	6–2, 6–1
Loss	17–23	Mar 2017	Indian Wells Open, United States	Premier M	Hard	(Russia) Elena Vesnina	7–6^{(8–6)}, 5–7, 4–6
Win	18–23	Aug 2018	Washington Open, United States (2)	International	Hard	(Croatia) Donna Vekić	4–6, 7–6^{(9–7)}, 6–2
Loss	18–24	Aug 2019	Cincinnati Open, United States	Premier 5	Hard	(United States) Madison Keys	5–7, 6–7^{(5–7)}

=== Doubles: 31 (16 titles, 15 runners–up) ===
Legend Grand Slam (2–5) Premier Mandatory & 5 (Tier I) (4–2) Premier (Tier II) (6–5) International (Tier III / IV) (4–3)	Titles by surface Hard (11–12) Grass (1–2) Clay (3–1) Carpet (1–0)

Result	W–L	Date	Tournament	Tier	Surface	Partner	Opponents	Score
Win	1–0	Jul 2002	Warsaw Open, Poland	Tier III	Clay	(Spain) Arantxa Sánchez Vicario	(Russia) Ekaterina Sysoeva; (Russia) Evgenia Kulikovskaya	6–2, 6–2
Win	2–0	Aug 2002	Nordic Light Open, Finland	Tier IV	Clay	(Spain) Arantxa Sánchez Vicario	(Spain) Eva Bes; (Spain) Maria Martínez Sánchez	6–3, 6–7^{(5–7)}, 6–3
Win	3–0	Sep 2002	Toyota Princess Cup, Japan	Tier II	Hard	(Spain) Arantxa Sánchez Vicario	(Hungary) Petra Mandula; (Austria) Patricia Wartusch	6–2, 6–4
Loss	3–1	Sep 2002	Wismilak International, Indonesia	Tier III	Hard	(Spain) Arantxa Sánchez Vicario	(Zimbabwe) Cara Black; (Spain) Virginia Ruano Pascual	2–6, 3–6
Loss	3–2	Oct 2002	Japan Open, Japan	Tier III	Hard	(Spain) Arantxa Sánchez Vicario	(Japan) Shinobu Asagoe; (Japan) Nana Miyagi	4–6, 6–4, 4–6
Win	4–2	Dec 2002	Hard Court Open, Australia	Tier III	Hard	(United States) Martina Navratilova	(France) Nathalie Dechy (France) Émilie Loit	6–4, 6–4
Win	5–2	Feb 2003	Dubai Championships, UAE	Tier II	Hard	(United States) Martina Navratilova	(Zimbabwe) Cara Black; (Russia) Elena Likhovtseva	6–3, 7–6^{(9–7)}
Win	6–2	May 2003	Italian Open, Italy	Tier I	Clay	(United States) Martina Navratilova	(Serbia and Montenegro) Jelena Dokić; (Russia) Nadia Petrova	6–4, 5–7, 6–2
Win	7–2	Aug 2003	Canadian Open, Canada	Tier I	Hard	(United States) Martina Navratilova	(Colombia) María Vento-Kabchi; (Indonesia) Angelique Widjaja	3–6, 6–1, 6–1
Loss	7–3	Aug 2003	US Open, United States	Grand Slam	Hard	(United States) Martina Navratilova	(Spain) Virginia Ruano Pascual; (Argentina) Paola Suárez	2–6, 3–6
Win	8–3	Sep 2003	Sparkassen Cup, Germany	Tier II	Carpet	(United States) Martina Navratilova	(Russia) Elena Likhovtseva (Russia) Nadia Petrova	3–6, 6–1, 6–3
Win	9–3	Jan 2004	Hard Court Open, Australia (2)	Tier III	Hard	(Russia) Elena Likhovtseva	(South Africa) Liezel Huber; (Bulgaria) Magdalena Maleeva	6–3, 6–4
Loss	9–4	Feb 2004	Australian Open, Australia	Grand Slam	Hard	(Russia) Elena Likhovtseva	(Spain) Virginia Ruano Pascual (Argentina) Paola Suárez	4–6, 3–6
Loss	9–5	Feb 2004	Dubai Championships, UAE	Tier II	Hard	(Russia) Elena Likhovtseva	(Slovakia) Janette Husárová; (Spain) Conchita Martínez	0–6, 6–1, 3–6
Win	10–5	Mar 2004	Qatar Open, Qatar	Tier II	Hard	(Russia) Elena Likhovtseva	(Slovakia) Janette Husárová (Spain) Conchita Martínez	7–6^{(7–4)}, 6–2
Loss	10–6	Mar 2004	Indian Wells Open, United States	Tier I	Hard	(Russia) Elena Likhovtseva	(Spain) Virginia Ruano Pascual (Argentina) Paola Suárez	1–6, 2–6
Loss	10–7	Mar 2004	Miami Open, United States	Tier I	Hard	(Russia) Elena Likhovtseva	(Russia) Nadia Petrova (United States) Meghann Shaughnessy	2–6, 3–6
Loss	10–8	May 2004	French Open, France	Grand Slam	Clay	(Russia) Elena Likhovtseva	(Spain) Virginia Ruano Pascual (Argentina) Paola Suárez	0–6, 3–6
Loss	10–9	Jun 2004	Eastbourne International, UK	Tier II	Grass	(Russia) Elena Likhovtseva	(Australia) Alicia Molik; (Spain) Magüi Serna	4–6, 4–6
Loss	10–10	Aug 2004	US Open, United States	Grand Slam	Hard	(Russia) Elena Likhovtseva	(Spain) Virginia Ruano Pascual (Argentina) Paola Suárez	4–6, 5–7
Loss	10–11	Sep 2004	Wismilak International, Indonesia	Tier III	Hard	(Spain) Arantxa Sánchez Vicario	(Russia) Anastasia Myskina; (Japan) Ai Sugiyama	3–6, 5–7
Win	11–11	Jan 2005	Australian Open, Australia	Grand Slam	Hard	(Australia) Alicia Molik	(United States) Lindsay Davenport; (United States) Corina Morariu	6–3, 6–4
Loss	11–12	Feb 2005	Dubai Championships, UAE	Tier II	Hard	(Australia) Alicia Molik	(Spain) Virginia Ruano Pascual; (Argentina) Paola Suárez	7–6, 2–6, 1–6
Win	12–12	Mar 2005	Miami Open, United States	Tier I	Hard	(Australia) Alicia Molik	(United States) Lisa Raymond; (Australia) Rennae Stubbs	7–5, 6–7^{(5–7)}, 6–2
Loss	12–13	Jun 2005	Wimbledon, United Kingdom	Grand Slam	Grass	(France) Amélie Mauresmo	(Zimbabwe) Cara Black; (United States) Liezel Huber	2–6, 1–6
Loss	12–14	Feb 2006	Dubai Championships, UAE	Tier II	Hard	(Russia) Nadia Petrova	(Czech Republic) Květa Peschke; (Italy) Francesca Schiavone	6–3, 6–7, 3–6
Win	13–14	Jun 2006	Eastbourne International, UK	Tier II	Grass	(France) Amélie Mauresmo	(United States) Martina Navratilova; (South Africa) Liezel Huber	6–2, 6–4
Loss	13–15	Feb 2007	Dubai Championships, UAE	Tier II	Hard	(Australia) Alicia Molik	(Zimbabwe) Cara Black; (United States) Liezel Huber	6–7, 4–6
Win	14–15	Apr 2009	Miami Open, United States (2)	Premier M	Hard	(France) Amélie Mauresmo	(Czech Republic) Květa Peschke; (United States) Lisa Raymond	4–6, 6–3, [10–3]
Win	15–15	Jan 2012	Australian Open, Australia (2)	Grand Slam	Hard	(Russia) Vera Zvonareva	(Italy) Sara Errani; (Italy) Roberta Vinci	5–7, 6–4, 6–3
Win	16–15	Oct 2013	Kremlin Cup, Russia	Premier	Hard (i)	(Australia) Samantha Stosur	(Russia) Alla Kudryavtseva; (Australia) Anastasia Rodionova	6–1, 1–6, [10–8]

== ITF Junior Circuit ==
=== Junior Grand Slam finals ===
==== Singles: 2 (2 runners-up) ====
Result	Year	Tournament	Surface	Opponent	Score
Loss	2001	French Open	Clay	(Estonia) Kaia Kanepi	3–6, 6–1, 2–6
Loss	2001	US Open	Hard	(France) Marion Bartoli	6–4, 3–6, 4–6

==== Doubles: 4 (1 title, 3 runners-up) ====
Result	Year	Tournament	Surface	Partner	Opponents	Score
Loss	2001	Australian Open	Hard	(Russia) Anna Bastrikova	(Czech Republic) Petra Cetkovská (Czech Republic) Barbora Strýcová	6–7^{(3-7)}, 6–1, 4–6
Win	2001	US Open	Hard	(Russia) Galina Fokina	(Socialist Federal Republic of Yugoslavia) Jelena Janković (Croatia) Matea Mezak	7–5, 6–3
Loss	2002	Australian Open	Hard	(Croatia) Matea Mezak	(Argentina) Gisela Dulko (Poland) Angelique Widjaja	2–6, 7–5, 4–6
Loss	2002	French Open	Clay	(Chinese Taipei) Su-Wei Hsieh	(Germany) Anna-Lena Grönefeld (Czech Republic) Barbora Strýcová	5–7, 5–7

== WTA Tour career earnings ==
Current as of 15 November 2021

Year	Grand Slam singles titles	WTA singles titles	Total singles titles	Earnings ($)	Money list rank
2000–01	0	0	0	14,546	N/A
2002	0	2	2	175,470	61
2003	0	0	0	564,484	18
2004	1	2	3	2,060,590	5
2005	0	0	0	1,246,818	10
2006	0	3	3	2,018,304	4
2007	0	1	1	2,287,487	2
2008	0	0	0	1,771,119	9
2009	1	2	3	3,658,841	3
2010	0	1	1	1,345,564	13
2011	0	0	0	830,935	22
2012	0	0	0	549,968	33
2013	0	0	0	846,733	22
2014	0	1	1	818,546	31
2015	0	1	1	1,136,803	28
2016	0	2	2	2,396,479	10
2017	0	0	0	2,343,699	14
2018	0	1	1	341,412	108
2019	0	0	0	593,245	70
2020	0	0	0	348,243	62
2021	0	0	0	333,290	113
Career	2	16	18	25,816,890	10

== Fed Cup/Billie Jean King Cup participation ==
This table is current through the 2015 Fed Cup

Legend
World Group (27–13)

=== Singles (21–11) ===
Edition	Round	Date	Location	Against	Surface	Opponent	W/L	Result
2004	WG 1R	24–25 Apr 2004	Moscow (RUS)	Australia	Carpet (i)	Alicia Molik	W	6–4, 3–6, 6–4
2004	WG QF	10–11 Jul 2004	Buenos Aires (ARG)	Argentina	Clay	Gisela Dulko	L	4–6, 6–3, 4–6
2004	WG SF	24 Nov 2004	Moscow (RUS)	Austria	Carpet (i)	Yvonne Meusburger	W	6–1, 6–1
2004	WG SF	25 Nov 2004	Moscow (RUS)	Austria	Carpet (i)	Daniela Kix	W	6–1, 6–1
2004	WG F	27 Nov 2004	Moscow (RUS)	France	Carpet (i)	Nathalie Dechy	L	6–3, 6–7^{(4–7)}, 6–8
2004	WG F	28 Nov 2004	Moscow (RUS)	France	Carpet (i)	Tatiana Golovin	L	4–6, 1–6
2007	WG QF	21 Apr 2007	Moscow (RUS)	Spain	Clay (i)	Lourdes Domínguez Lino	W	6–3, 6–2
2007	WG QF	22 Apr 2007	Moscow (RUS)	Spain	Clay (i)	Anabel Medina Garrigues	W	6–3, 4–6, 6–0
2007	WG F	15 Sep 2007	Moscow (RUS)	Italy	Hard (i)	Mara Santangelo	W	6–1, 6–2
2007	WG F	16 Sep 2007	Moscow (RUS)	Italy	Hard (i)	Francesca Schiavone	W	4–6, 7–6^{(9–7)}, 7–5
2008	WG SF	26–27 Apr 2008	Moscow (RUS)	United States	Clay (i)	Ahsha Rolle	W	6–2, 6–1
2008	WG F	13 Sep 2008	Madrid (ESP)	(Spain)	Clay	Carla Suárez Navarro	W	6–3, 6–1
2008	WG F	14 Sep 2008	Madrid (ESP)	(Spain)	Clay	Anabel Medina Garrigues	W	5–7, 6–3, 6–4
2009	WG QF	7–8 Feb 2009	Moscow (RUS)	China	Hard (i)	Yan Zi	W	6–2, 6–4
2009	WG SF	25 Apr 2009	Castellaneta Marina (ITA)	Italy	Clay	Francesca Schiavone	L	6–1, 2–6, 3–6
2009	WG SF	26 Apr 2009	Castellaneta Marina (ITA)	Italy	Clay	Flavia Pennetta	W	6–0, 6–3
2010	WG QF	6 Feb 2010	Belgrade (SRB)	Serbia	Hard (i)	Ana Ivanovic	W	6–1, 6–4
2010	WG QF	7 Feb 2010	Belgrade (SRB)	Serbia	Hard (i)	Jelena Janković	L	3–6, 6–4, 3–6
2011	WG QF	5 Feb 2011	Moscow (RUS)	France	Hard (i)	Alizé Cornet	L	6–3, 3–6, 4–6
2011	WG QF	6 Feb 2011	Moscow (RUS)	France	Hard (i)	Virginie Razzano	W	6–4, 6–4
2011	WG SF	16–17 Apr 2011	Moscow (RUS)	Italy	Hard (i)	Roberta Vinci	W	6–2, 6–7^{(4–7)}, 6–1
2011	WG F	5 Nov 2011	Moscow (RUS)	Czech Republic	Hard (i)	Lucie Šafářová	W	6–2, 6–3
2011	WG F	6 Nov 2011	Moscow (RUS)	Czech Republic	Hard (i)	Petra Kvitová	L	6–4, 2–6, 3–6
2012	WG QF	4 Feb 2012	Moscow (RUS)	Spain	Hard (i)	Carla Suárez Navarro	W	6–3, 6–1
2012	WG QF	5 Feb 2012	Moscow (RUS)	Spain	Hard (i)	Sílvia Soler Espinosa	W	6–2, 4–6, 6–3
2012	WG SF	21 Apr 2012	Moscow (RUS)	Serbia	Clay (i)	Ana Ivanovic	W	6–2, 2–6, 6–4
2012	WG SF	22 Apr 2012	Moscow (RUS)	Serbia	Clay (i)	Jelena Janković	L	1–6, 4–6
2015	WG QF	7 Feb 2015	Kraków (POL)	Poland	Hard (i)	Agnieszka Radwańska	W	6–4, 2–6, 6–2
2015	WG SF	18 Apr 2015	Sochi (RUS)	Germany	Clay (i)	Julia Görges	W	6–4, 6–4
2015	WG SF	19 Apr 2015	Sochi (RUS)	Germany	Clay (i)	Andrea Petkovic	L	2–6, 1–6
2016	WG QF	6 Feb 2016	Moscow (RUS)	Netherlands	Hard (i)	Richèl Hogenkamp	L	6–7^{(4–7)}, 7–5, 8–10
2016	WG QF	7 Feb 2016	Moscow (RUS)	Netherlands	Hard (i)	Kiki Bertens	L	1–6, 4–6

=== Doubles (6–2) ===
Edition	Round	Date	Location	Against	Surface	Partner	Opponents	W/L	Result
2004	WG 1R	25 Apr 2004	Moscow (RUS)	Australia	Carpet (i)	Elena Likhovtseva	Alicia Molik; Rennae Stubbs	W	6–2, 3–6, 7–6^{(9–7)}
2004	WG QF	11 Jul 2004	Buenos Aires (ARG)	Argentina	Clay	Elena Likhovtseva	Gisela Dulko; Patricia Tarabini	W	6–2, 5–7, 6–4
2004	WG SF	25 Nov 2004	Moscow (RUS)	Austria	Carpet (i)	Elena Likhovtseva	Yvonne Meusburger; Patricia Wartusch	W	6–2, 6–2
2008	WG SF	27 Apr 2008	Moscow (RUS)	United States	Clay (i)	Elena Vesnina	Liezel Huber; Vania King	L	6–7^{(3–7)}, 4–6
2009	WG QF	8 Feb 2009	Moscow (RUS)	China	Hard (i)	Elena Dementieva	Sun Tiantian; Yan Zi	W	1–6, 6–4, 6–4
2010	WG QF	7 Feb 2010	Belgrade (SRB)	Serbia	Hard (i)	Alisa Kleybanova	Ana Ivanovic; Jelena Janković	W	6–1, 6–4
2011	WG QF	6 Feb 2011	Moscow (RUS)	France	Hard (i)	Anastasia Pavlyuchenkova	Julie Coin; Alizé Cornet	W	7–6^{(7–4)}, 6–0
2012	WG QF	5 Feb 2012	Moscow (RUS)	Spain	Hard (i)	Nadia Petrova	Nuria Llagostera Vives; Arantxa Parra Santonja	L	3–6, 0–0, ret.

== Career Grand Slam tournament seedings ==
Year	Australian Open	French Open	Wimbledon	US Open
2002	qualifier	absent	absent	qualifier
2003	unseeded	unseeded	33rd	27th
2004	30th	11th	8th	9th
2005	5th	6th	5th	5th
2006	14th	8th	5th	6th
2007	3rd	3rd	5th	4th
2008	2nd	4th	4th	3rd
2009	8th	7th	5th	6th
2010	3rd	6th	19th	11th
2011	23rd	13th	12th	15th
2012	18th	26th	32nd	absent
2013	unseeded	unseeded	absent	27th
2014	19th	27th	28th	20th
2015	27th	18th	26th	30th
2016	23rd	13th	13th	9th
2017	8th	8th	7th	8th
2018	absent	unseeded	unseeded	wild card
2019	absent	unseeded	unseeded	unseeded
2020	unseeded	28th	not held	absent
2021	unseeded	unseeded	unseeded	absent

== Wins against top 10 players ==
No.	Player	Rk	Event	Surface	Rd	Score	Rk	Years	Ref
1.	(Japan) Ai Sugiyama	No. 8	Dubai Championships, UAE	Hard	SF	6–0, 7–5	29	2004	
2.	(Belgium) Justine Henin	No. 1	Qatar Open	Hard	SF	6–2, 4–6, 6–3	29	2004	
3.	(Russia) Elena Dementieva	No. 9	German Open	Clay	3R	6–2, 6–7^{(5–7)}, 6–4	14	2004	
4.	(United States) Lindsay Davenport	No. 4	US Open	Hard	SF	1–6, 6–2, 6–4	9	2004	
5.	(Russia) Elena Dementieva	No. 6	US Open	Hard	F	6–3, 7–5	9	2004	
6.	(Russia) Maria Sharapova	No. 9	China Open	Hard	SF	6–2, 6–2	5	2004	
7.	(France) Amélie Mauresmo	No. 2	Dubai Championships, UAE	Hard	QF	7–6^{(13–11)}, 6–4	15	2006	
8.	(France) Amélie Mauresmo	No. 1	Miami Open, USA	Hard	SF	6–1, 6–4	14	2006	
9.	(Russia) Maria Sharapova	No. 4	Miami Open, USA	Hard	F	6–4, 6–3	14	2006	
10.	(Switzerland) Patty Schnyder	No. 9	Amelia Island Championships, USA	Clay	QF	6–3, 6–1	10	2006	
11.	(Russia) Elena Dementieva	No. 5	Connecticut Open, USA	Hard	QF	6–3, 3–6, 6–2	7	2006	
12.	(France) Amélie Mauresmo	No. 1	China Open	Hard	F	6–4, 6–0	5	2006	
13.	(Switzerland) Martina Hingis	No. 9	Zurich Open, Switzerland	Hard (i)	QF	6–1, 1–6, 6–3	4	2006	
14.	(Russia) Elena Dementieva	No. 8	WTA Tour Championships, U.S.	Hard (i)	RR	7–6, 6–4	4	2006	
15.	(Czech Republic) Nicole Vaidišová	No. 10	Indian Wells Open, USA	Hard	QF	4–6, 6–3, 6–4	4	2007	
16.	(Russia) Nadia Petrova	No. 9	German Open	Clay	QF	7–6^{(7–5)}, 6–4	5	2007	
17.	(Belgium) Justine Henin	No. 1	German Open	Clay	SF	6–4, 5–7, 6–4	5	2007	
18.	(Russia) Dinara Safina	No. 9	Italian Open	Clay	QF	6–1, 6–3	3	2007	
19.	(Russia) Anna Chakvetadze	No. 6	US Open	Hard	SF	3–6, 6–1, 6–1	4	2007	
20.	(United States) Serena Williams	No. 7	Stuttgart Open, Germany	Hard	QF	6–3, 6–3	2	2007	
21.	(Serbia) Jelena Janković	No. 4	Dubai Championships, UAE	Hard	SF	5–7, 6–4, 6–3	2	2008	
22.	(Russia) Maria Sharapova	No. 5	Indian Wells Open, USA	Hard	SF	6–3, 5–7, 6–2	3	2008	
23.	(United States) Venus Williams	No. 7	Miami Open, USA	Hard	QF	6–4, 6–4	4	2008	
24.	(Serbia) Jelena Janković	No. 2	Pan Pacific Open, Japan	Hard	QF	2–6, 7–5, 7–5	7	2008	
25.	(Russia) Elena Dementieva	No. 3	Stuttgart Open, Germany	Clay (i)	SF	6–4, 6–2	9	2009	
26.	(Russia) Dinara Safina	No. 1	Stuttgart Open, Germany	Clay (i)	F	6–4, 6–3	9	2009	
27.	(Serbia) Jelena Janković	No. 4	Italian Open	Clay	QF	6–1, 7–5^{(7–3)}	8	2009	
28.	(Belarus) Victoria Azarenka	No. 9	Italian Open	Clay	SF	6–2, 6–4	8	2009	
29.	(United States) Serena Williams	No. 2	French Open	Clay	QF	7–6^{(7–3)}, 5–7, 7–5	7	2009	
30.	(Russia) Dinara Safina	No. 1	French Open	Clay	F	6–4, 6–2	7	2009	
31.	(Russia) Elena Dementieva	No. 5	WTA Finals, Qatar	Hard	RR	6–3, 6–2	3	2009	
32.	(Poland) Agnieszka Radwańska	No. 10	Southern California Open, USA	Hard	F	6–4, 6–7^{(7–9)}, 6–3	21	2010	
33.	(Poland) Agnieszka Radwańska	No. 9	Canadian Open	Hard	3R	6–4, 1–6, 6–3	16	2010	
34.	(Australia) Samantha Stosur	No. 6	Sydney International, Australia	Hard	2R	3–6, 6–3, 6–4	25	2011	
35.	(Italy) Francesca Schiavone	No. 4	Dubai Championships, UAE	Hard	3R	1–6, 6–0, 7–5	23	2011	
36.	(Poland) Agnieszka Radwańska	No. 10	Dubai Championships, UAE	Hard	QF	7–6^{(9–7)}, 6–3	23	2011	
37.	(Russia) Vera Zvonareva	No. 7	Sydney International, Australia	Hard	1R	6–1, 6–2	19	2012	
38.	(Poland) Agnieszka Radwańska	No. 3	French Open	Clay	3R	6–1, 6–2	28	2012	
39.	(Denmark) Caroline Wozniacki	No. 10	Sydney International, Australia	Hard	2R	7–6^{(7–4)}, 1–6, 6–2	85	2013	
40.	(Denmark) Caroline Wozniacki	No. 10	Australian Open	Hard	4R	6–2, 2–6, 7–5	75	2013	
41.	(Germany) Angelique Kerber	No. 8	French Open	Hard	4R	6–4, 4–6, 6–3	39	2013	
42.	(Italy) Sara Errani	No. 6	Pan Pacific Open, Japan	Hard	2R	6–4, 6–4	27	2013	
43.	(Romania) Simona Halep	No. 5	Stuttgart Open, Germany	Clay	2R	7–5, 7–6^{(7–4)}	29	2014	
44.	(Czech Republic) Petra Kvitová	No. 6	French Open	Clay	3R	6–7^{(3–7)}, 6–1, 9–7	28	2014	
45.	(Canada) Eugenie Bouchard	No. 8	Cincinnati Open, USA	Hard	2R	6–4, 3–6, 6–2	24	2014	
46.	(Germany) Angelique Kerber	No. 10	China Open	Hard	3R	2–6, 6–4, 6–3	27	2014	
47.	(Poland) Agnieszka Radwańska	No. 8	Fed Cup, Kraków, Poland	Hard (i)	QF	6–4, 2–6, 6–2	27	2015	
48.	(Russia) Ekaterina Makarova	No. 8	Madrid Open, Spain	Clay	1R	6–2, 6–1	29	2015	
49.	(Russia) Maria Sharapova	No. 3	Madrid Open, Spain	Clay	SF	6–2, 6–4	29	2015	
50.	(Romania) Simona Halep	No. 2	Sydney International, Australia	Hard	SF	7–6^{(7–5)}, 4–6, 6–3	25	2016	
51.	(United States) Serena Williams	No. 1	Miami Open, USA	Hard	4R	6–7^{(3–7)}, 6–1, 6–2	19	2016	
52.	(United States) Venus Williams	No. 7	Wuhan Open, China	Hard	3R	6–2, 6–2	10	2016	
53.	(Poland) Agnieszka Radwańska	No. 4	Wuhan Open, China	Hard	QF	1–6, 7–6^{(11–9)}, 6–4	10	2016	
54.	(Poland) Agnieszka Radwańska	No. 3	WTA Finals, Singapore	Hard (i)	RR	7–5, 1–6, 7–5	9	2016	
55.	(Czech Republic) Karolína Plíšková	No. 5	WTA Finals, Singapore	Hard (i)	RR	3–6, 6–2, 7–6^{(8–6)}	9	2016	
56.	(Czech Republic) Karolína Plíšková	No. 3	Indian Wells Open, United States	Hard	SF	7–6^{(7–5)}, 7–6^{(7–2)}	8	2017	
57.	(Poland) Agnieszka Radwańska	No. 10	Wimbledon, United Kingdom	Grass	4R	6–2, 6–4	8	2017	
58.	(Belarus) Aryna Sabalenka	No. 10	Madrid Open, Spain	Clay	1R	7–5, 6–4	109	2019	
59.	(United States) Sloane Stephens	No. 10	Cincinnati Open, United States	Hard	3R	6–1, 6–2	153	2019	
60.	(Czech Republic) Karolína Plíšková	No. 3	Cincinnati Open, United States	Hard	QF	3–6, 7–6^{(7–2)}, 6–3	153	2019	
61.	(Australia) Ashleigh Barty	No. 2	Cincinnati Open, United States	Hard	SF	6–2, 6–4	153	2019	
62.	(Switzerland) Belinda Bencic	No. 9	Qatar Open	Hard	QF	6–4, 6–4	46	2020	
63.	(Ukraine) Elina Svitolina	No. 5	Dubai Championships, UAE	Hard	2R	2–6, 6–4, 6–1	41	2021	

- Key: (Rk) first use, opponent rank; (Rd) round; (Rk) 2nd use, player rank; (Ref) reference; (F) final; (SF) semifinal; (QF) quarterfinal; (#R) rounds 4, 3, 2, 1; (RR) round-robin stage

== See also ==
- List of Grand Slam Women's Singles champions
- WTA Tour records
