= 2004 Wismilak International =

- Date: 13–19 September
- Edition: 10th
- Category: Tier III
- Draw: 30S / 16D
- Prize money: $225,000
- Surface: Hard / outdoor
- Location: Bali, Indonesia

Champions

Singles
- (Russia) Svetlana Kuznetsova

Doubles
- (Russia) Anastasia Myskina / (Japan) Ai Sugiyama
← 2003 ·	Wismilak International	· 2005 →

The 2004 Wismilak International was a women's tennis tournament played on outdoor hard courts in Bali, Indonesia that was part of the Tier III category of the 2004 WTA Tour. It was the tenth edition of the tournament and was held from 13 September through 19 September 2004. Second-seeded Svetlana Kuznetsova won the singles title and earned $35,000 first-prize money.

== Finals ==
=== Singles ===
(Russia) Svetlana Kuznetsova defeated (Germany) Marlene Weingärtner, 6–1, 6–4

- It was Kuznetsova's 3rd singles title of the year and the 5th of her career.

=== Doubles ===
(Russia) Anastasia Myskina / (Japan) Ai Sugiyama defeated (Russia) Svetlana Kuznetsova / (Spain) Arantxa Sánchez Vicario, 6–3, 7–5
