= 2002 J&S Cup =

- Date: 6–12 May
- Edition: 7th
- Location: Warsaw, Poland

Champions

Singles
- (Russia) Elena Bovina

Doubles
- (Croatia) Jelena Kostanić / (Slovakia) Henrieta Nagyová
← 2000 ·	J&S Cup	· 2003 →

The 2002 J&S Cup was a tennis tournament played on clay courts in Warsaw, Poland. The event was part of the 2002 WTA Tour. The tournament was held from May 6 to 12, 2002.

== Finals ==
=== Singles ===
(Russia) Elena Bovina defeated (Slovakia) Henrieta Nagyová, 6–3, 6–1.

=== Doubles ===
(Croatia) Jelena Kostanić / (Slovakia) Henrieta Nagyová defeated (Russia) Evgenia Kulikovskaya / (Croatia) Silvija Talaja, 6–1, 6–1.
