= 2002 J&S Cup – Doubles =

Doubles
- 2002 J&S Cup

Final
- Champion: (Croatia) Jelena Kostanić (Slovakia) Henrieta Nagyová
- Runner-up: (Russia) Evgenia Kulikovskaya (Croatia) Silvija Talaja
- Score: 6–1, 6–1

Details
- Draw: 16
- Seeds: 4

Events
Singles	Doubles
← 2000 ·	Warsaw Open	· 2003 →

The 2002 J&S Cup was a tennis tournament played on clay courts in Warsaw, Poland the event was part of the 2002 WTA Tour. The tournament was held from May 6 to 12, 2002. Tathiana Garbin and Janette Husárová were the reigning champions, but chose not to defend their title. Jelena Kostanić and Henrieta Nagyová won in the final against Evgenia Kulikovskaya and Silvija Talaja, 6–1, 6–1.

== Seeds ==
1. (France) Émilie Loit / (Italy) Roberta Vinci (quarterfinals)
2. (Argentina) Laura Montalvo / (Argentina) María Emilia Salerni (quarterfinals)
3. (United States) Samantha Reeves / (Kazakhstan) Irina Selyutina (quarterfinals)
4. (Spain) Eva Bes / (Venezuela) María Vento-Kabchi (first round)

== Main draw ==
=== Key ===
- Q = Qualifier
- WC = Wild card
- LL = Lucky loser
- Alt = Alternate
- SE = Special exempt
- PR = Protected ranking
- ITF = ITF entry
- JE = Junior exempt
- w/o = Walkover
- r = Retired
- d = Defaulted
- SR = Special ranking

=== Draw ===
First round
1	(France) É Loit (Italy) R Vinci	6	6
(France) S Foretz (Germany) C Schneider	4	3
(Russia) A Jidkova (Belarus) N Ostrovskaya	3	4
(Russia) S Kuznetsova (Czech Republic) R Voráčová	6	6
3	(United States) S Reeves (Kazakhstan) I Selyutina	6	6
(South Africa) N Grandin (Netherlands) A van Exel	1	0
LL	(Russia) V Douchevina (Poland) A Rosolska	1	5
Q	(Russia) E Koulikovskaya (Croatia) S Talaja	6	7
(South Africa) K Grant (United States) Abigail Spears	6	7
(India) M Malhotra (New Zealand) S Stephens	4	6^{3}
(Croatia) J Kostanić (Slovakia) H Nagyová	6	6
4	(Spain) E Bes (Venezuela) M Vento-Kabchi	3	4
(Bulgaria) L Bacheva (Belarus) T Poutchek	6	6
(Germany) K Freye (Romania) A Vanc	2	3
WC	(Poland) M Domachowska (Poland) K Jans	3	1
2	(Argentina) L Montalvo (Argentina) M. E. Salerni	6	6

Quarterfinals
1	(France) É Loit (Italy) R Vinci
(Russia) S Kuznetsova (Czech Republic) R Voráčová	w/	o
3	(United States) S Reeves (Kazakhstan) I Selyutina	1	2
Q	(Russia) E Koulikovskaya (Croatia) S Talaja	6	6
(South Africa) K Grant (United States) Abigail Spears	4	6	1
(Croatia) J Kostanić (Slovakia) H Nagyová	6	4	6
(Bulgaria) L Bacheva (Belarus) T Poutchek	w/	o
2	(Argentina) L Montalvo (Argentina) M. E. Salerni

Semifinals
(Russia) S Kuznetsova (Czech Republic) R Voráčová	6	2	3
Q	(Russia) E Koulikovskaya (Croatia) S Talaja	2	6	6
(Croatia) J Kostanić (Slovakia) H Nagyová	7	6
(Bulgaria) L Bacheva (Belarus) T Poutchek	6^{2}	2

Final
Q	(Russia) E Koulikovskaya (Croatia) S Talaja	1	1
(Croatia) J Kostanić (Slovakia) H Nagyová	6	6
