= 2003 J&S Cup – Doubles =

Doubles
- 2003 J&S Cup

Final
- Champions: (South Africa) Liezel Huber (Bulgaria) Magdalena Maleeva
- Runners-up: (Greece) Eleni Daniilidou (Italy) Francesca Schiavone
- Score: 3–6, 6–4, 6–2

Details
- Draw: 16
- Seeds: 4

Events
Singles	Doubles
← 2002 ·	Warsaw Open	· 2004 →

Jelena Kostanić and Henrieta Nagyová were the defending champions, but they both chose not to compete that year.

Liezel Huber and Magdalena Maleeva won in the final 3–6, 6–4, 6–2 against Eleni Daniilidou and Francesca Schiavone.

== Seeds ==
1. (South Africa) Liezel Huber / (Bulgaria) Magdalena Maleeva (champions)
2. (Slovenia) Tina Križan / (Slovenia) Katarina Srebotnik (quarterfinals)
3. (Netherlands) Kristie Boogert / (Spain) Magüi Serna (semifinals)
4. (France) Caroline Dhenin / (Paraguay) Rossana Neffa-de los Ríos (quarterfinals)

== Draw ==
=== Key ===
- Q = Qualifier
- WC = Wild card
- LL = Lucky loser
- Alt = Alternate
- SE = Special exempt
- PR = Protected ranking
- ITF = ITF entry
- JE = Junior exempt
- w/o = Walkover
- r = Retired
- d = Defaulted
- SR = Special ranking

First round
1	(South Africa) L Huber (Bulgaria) M Maleeva	7	7
(Germany) A Barna (Germany) V Henke	5	6^{4}
(Hungary) K Marosi (Czech Republic) R Voráčová	6	6
(Argentina) P Tarabini (Netherlands) C Vis	2	1
3	(Netherlands) K Boogert (Spain) M Serna	6	6
(Czech Republic) S Kleinová (Poland) K Jans	2	4
WC	(Poland) N Bubien (Poland) A Rosolska	1	2
(Ukraine) Y Fedak (United States) G Lastra	6	6
(Poland) K Straczy (Poland) A Zarska	1	4
(Czech Republic) D Chládková (United States) J Craybas	6	6
(Poland) K Kosińska (Poland) A Rosolska	4	0
4	(France) C Dhenin (Paraguay) R Neffa-de los Ríos	6	6
(Greece) E Daniilidou (Italy) F Schiavone	6	6
(Russia) O Kalyuzhnaya (Spain) A Parra	4	2
Q	(Czech Republic) Z Ondrášková (Slovakia) M Suchá	2	1
2	(Slovenia) T Križan (Slovenia) K Srebotnik

Quarterfinals
1	(South Africa) L Huber (Bulgaria) M Maleeva	6	6
(Hungary) K Marosi (Czech Republic) R Voráčová	4	2
3	(Netherlands) K Boogert (Spain) M Serna	6	5	6
(Ukraine) Y Fedak (United States) G Lastra	2	7	2
(Czech Republic) D Chládková (United States) J Craybas	7	3	6
4	(France) C Dhenin (Paraguay) R Neffa-de los Ríos	6^{4}	6	3
(Greece) E Daniilidou (Italy) F Schiavone	7	7
2	(Slovenia) T Križan (Slovenia) K Srebotnik	6^{4}	5

Semifinals
1	(South Africa) L Huber (Bulgaria) M Maleeva	1	6	6
3	(Netherlands) K Boogert (Spain) M Serna	6	2	2
(Czech Republic) D Chládková (United States) J Craybas	1	0
(Greece) E Daniilidou (Italy) F Schiavone	6	6

Final
1	(South Africa) L Huber (Bulgaria) M Maleeva	3	6	6
(Greece) E Daniilidou (Italy) F Schiavone	6	4	2
