= 2002 J&S Cup – Singles =

Singles
- 2002 J&S Cup

Final
- Champion: (Russia) Elena Bovina
- Runner-up: (Slovakia) Henrieta Nagyová
- Score: 6–3, 6–1

Details
- Draw: 32
- Seeds: 8

Events
Singles	Doubles
← 2001 ·	J&S Cup	· 2003 →

The 2002 J&S Cup was a tennis tournament played on clay courts in Warsaw, Poland the event was part of the 2002 WTA Tour. The tournament was held from May 6 to 12, 2002. Henrieta Nagyová was the defending champion, but lost in the final to Elena Bovina of Russia 6–3, 6–1.

== Seeds ==
1. (Slovakia) Henrieta Nagyová (final)
2. (Belarus) Tatiana Poutchek (first round)
3. (Russia) Anna Kournikova (first round)
4. (Russia) Alina Jidkova (first round)
5. (Spain) Virginia Ruano Pascual (quarterfinals)
6. (United States) Samantha Reeves (second round)
7. (Croatia) Jelena Kostanić (first round)
8. (France) Stéphanie Foretz (second round)

== Draw ==
=== Key ===
- Q = Qualifier
- WC = Wild card
- LL = Lucky loser
- Alt = Alternate
- SE = Special exempt
- PR = Protected ranking
- ITF = ITF entry
- JE = Junior exempt
- w/o = Walkover
- r = Retired
- d = Defaulted
- SR = Special ranking

=== Finals ===
Semifinals
1	(Slovakia) Henrieta Nagyová	6	6
(Russia) Vera Zvonareva	1	4
(Russia) Elena Bovina	1	6	7
(Croatia) Silvija Talaja	6	2	5

Final
1	(Slovakia) Henrieta Nagyová	3	1
(Russia) Elena Bovina	6	6

=== Top half ===
First round
1	(Slovakia) H Nagyová	6	6
(Kazakhstan) I Selyutina	4	4
(Italy) M. E. Camerin	6	5	4
Q	(Czech Republic) R Voráčová	3	7	6
WC	(Poland) M Domachowska	6^{2}	6	3
(France) C Beigbeder	7	1	6
Q	(Russia) V Douchevina	1	6^{2}
5	(Spain) V Ruano Pascual	6	7
4	(Russia) A Jidkova	0	3
(Tunisia) S Sfar	6	6
(Argentina) M. E. Salerni	1	4
(Italy) T Garbin	6	6
(Spain) E Bes	6	4	1
(Russia) V Zvonareva	4	6	6
(France) É Loit	6	6
7	(Croatia) J Kostanić	4	0

Second round
1	(Slovakia) H Nagyová	7	6
Q	(Czech Republic) R Voráčová	5	2
(France) C Beigbeder	3	2
5	(Spain) V Ruano Pascual	6	6
(Tunisia) S Sfar	6	6
(Italy) T Garbin	3	2
(Russia) V Zvonareva	6	6
(France) É Loit	3	2

Quarterfinals
1	(Slovakia) H Nagyová	6^{1}	7	6
5	(Spain) V Ruano Pascual	7	5	1
(Tunisia) S Sfar	4	6^{2}
(Russia) V Zvonareva	6	7

Semifinals
1	(Slovakia) H Nagyová	6	6
(Russia) V Zvonareva	1	4

=== Bottom half ===
First round
6	(United States) S Reeves	7	6
(Germany) J Kandarr	6^{4}	2
WC	(Poland) J Sakowicz	6	4	3
(Russia) E Bovina	1	6	6
(Canada) J Nejedly	1	5
(Netherlands) S Noorlander	6	7
Q	(Russia) S Kuznetsova	6	4	5
3	(Russia) A Kournikova	4	6	2^{r}
8	(France) S Foretz	7	6
(Russia) E Koulikovskaya	5	2
(Slovakia) L Cervanová	6	6
Q	(Italy) R Vinci	1	3
(Bulgaria) L Bacheva	6	6
(United States) J Craybas	3	0
(Croatia) S Talaja	6	6
2	(Belarus) T Poutchek	4	2

Second round
6	(United States) S Reeves	4	6^{1}
(Russia) E Bovina	6	7
(Netherlands) S Noorlander	4	6	1
Q	(Russia) S Kuznetsova	6	2	6
8	(France) S Foretz	2	3
(Slovakia) L Cervanová	6	6
(Bulgaria) L Bacheva	3	3
(Croatia) S Talaja	6	6

Quarterfinals
(Russia) E Bovina	6	6
Q	(Russia) S Kuznetsova	3	2
(Slovakia) L Cervanová	6	3	5
(Croatia) S Talaja	2	6	7

Semifinals
(Russia) E Bovina	1	6	7
(Croatia) S Talaja	6	2	5
