= 2004 J&S Cup =

- Date: 26 April – 2 May
- Edition: 9th
- Category: Tier II
- Draw: 28S / 16D
- Prize money: $585,000
- Surface: Clay / outdoor
- Location: Warsaw, Poland

Champions

Singles
- (United States) Venus Williams

Doubles
- (Italy) Silvia Farina Elia / (Italy) Francesca Schiavone
← 2003 ·	Warsaw Open	· 2005 →

The 2004 J&S Cup was a Tier II women's tennis event on the 2004 WTA Tour that ran from 26 April until 2 May 2004. It was held in Warsaw, Poland, and was the 9th year that the event was staged. The 2003 J&S Cup finalist Venus Williams won her first Warsaw title and second overall of the year.

== Finals ==
=== Singles ===
(United States) Venus Williams defeated (Russia) Svetlana Kuznetsova, 6-1, 6-4

=== Doubles ===
(Italy) Silvia Farina Elia / (Italy) Francesca Schiavone defeated (Argentina) Gisela Dulko / (Argentina) Patricia Tarabini, 3-6, 6-2, 6-1

== Entrants ==
=== Seeds ===
Player	Nationality	Ranking*	Seeding
Amélie Mauresmo	France	3	1
Venus Williams	United States	4	2
Vera Zvonareva	Russia	11	3
Svetlana Kuznetsova	Russia	14	4
~~Paola Suárez~~	Argentina	15	5
Silvia Farina Elia	Italy	16	6
Patty Schnyder	Switzerland	17	7
Anna Smashnova-Pistolesi	Israel	20	8
Francesca Schiavone	Italy	22	9

- Seedings are based on the rankings of April 19, 2004.
- Paola Suárez (no. 5 seed) withdrew from the tournament due to low back pain; Francesca Schiavone became the no. 9 seed.

=== Other entrants ===
The following players received wildcards into the main draw:

- (Russia) Vera Douchevina
- (Poland) Marta Domachowska

The following players received entry from the qualifying draw:

- (Slovakia) Henrieta Nagyová
- (Czech Republic) Květa Peschke
- (United States) Kristen Schlukebir
- (Ukraine) Elena Tatarkova

The following players received entry as lucky losers:

- (Czech Republic) Lenka Němečková
