= 2004 J&S Cup – Doubles =

Doubles
- 2004 J&S Cup

Final
- Champions: (Italy) Silvia Farina Elia (Italy) Francesca Schiavone
- Runners-up: (Argentina) Gisela Dulko (Argentina) Patricia Tarabini
- Score: 3–6, 6–2, 6–1

Details
- Draw: 16
- Seeds: 4

Events
Singles	Doubles
← 2003 ·	Warsaw Open	· 2005 →

The 2004 J&S Cup – Doubles was a tennis competition.https://www.tennislive.net/wta-women/js-cup-warsaw-2004/

Liezel Huber and Magdalena Maleeva were the defending champions, but they both chose not to compete that year.

Silvia Farina Elia and Francesca Schiavone won in the final 3–6, 6–2, 6–1 against Gisela Dulko and Patricia Tarabini.

== Seeds ==
1. (Russia) Elena Likhovtseva / (Russia) Vera Zvonareva (semifinals)
2. (Italy) Silvia Farina Elia / (Italy) Francesca Schiavone (champions)
3. (Slovenia) Tina Križan / (Slovenia) Katarina Srebotnik (first round)
4. (Russia) Elena Bovina / (Czech Republic) Denisa Chládková (quarterfinals)

== Draw ==
=== Key ===
- Q = Qualifier
- WC = Wild card
- LL = Lucky loser
- Alt = Alternate
- ITF = ITF entry
- PR = Protected ranking
- SR = Special ranking
- SE = Special exempt
- JE = Junior exempt
- JR = Junior Accelerator Programme entrant
- CO = College Accelerator Programme entrant
- NG = Next Gen Accelerator Program entrant
- w/o = Walkover
- r = Retired
- d = Defaulted

First round
1	(Russia) E Likhovtseva (Russia) V Zvonareva	6	7
(Russia) E Kulikovskaya (Russia) A Rodionova	2	5
WC	(Poland) K Jans (Poland) A Rosolska	4	3
(Italy) Ad. Serra Zanetti (Italy) An. Serra Zanetti	6	6
4	(Russia) E Bovina (Czech Republic) D Chládková	6	7
(Czech Republic) O Blahotová (Czech Republic) G Navrátilová	3	5
(Argentina) G Dulko (Argentina) P Tarabini	6	6^{1}	6
WC	(Slovakia) D Hantuchová (Slovenia) T Pisnik	2	7	1
(Czech Republic) L Němečková (Czech Republic) M Paštiková	4	3
(Belarus) D Kustova (Ukraine) E Tatarkova	6	6
(Greece) E Daniilidou (Colombia) F Zuluaga	7	1	6
3	(Slovenia) T Križan (Slovenia) K Srebotnik	^{1}	6	1
(United States) T Ashley (Spain) A Medina Garrigues	4	1
(Slovakia) H Nagyová (Czech Republic) K Peschke	6	6
Q	(Poland) M Domachowska (Ukraine) Y Fedak	0	2
2	(Italy) S Farina Elia (Italy) F Schiavone	6	6

Quarterfinals
1	(Russia) E Likhovtseva (Russia) V Zvonareva	6	6
(Italy) Ad. Serra Zanetti (Italy) An. Serra Zanetti	1	4
4	(Russia) E Bovina (Czech Republic) D Chládková	3	6	3
(Argentina) G Dulko (Argentina) P Tarabini	6	2	6
(Belarus) D Kustova (Ukraine) E Tatarkova	4	5
(Greece) E Daniilidou (Colombia) F Zuluaga	6	7
(Slovakia) H Nagyová (Czech Republic) K Peschke	6	2	2
2	(Italy) S Farina Elia (Italy) F Schiavone	4	6	6

Semifinals
1	(Russia) E Likhovtseva (Russia) V Zvonareva	3	6	4
(Argentina) G Dulko (Argentina) P Tarabini	6	3	6
(Greece) E Daniilidou (Colombia) F Zuluaga	6^{3}	2
2	(Italy) S Farina Elia (Italy) F Schiavone	7	6

Final
(Argentina) G Dulko (Argentina) P Tarabini	6	2	1
2	(Italy) S Farina Elia (Italy) F Schiavone	3	6	6
