= 2004 Dubai Tennis Championships – Men's singles =

Men's singles
- 2004 Dubai Tennis Championships

Final
- Champion: (Switzerland) Roger Federer
- Runner-up: (Spain) Feliciano López
- Score: 4–6, 6–1, 6–2

Details
- Draw: 32
- Seeds: 8

Events
Singles	men	women
Doubles	men	women
- Dubai Tennis Championships

Roger Federer was the defending champion and won in the final 4–6, 6–1, 6–2 against Feliciano López.

== Seeds ==
A champion seed is indicated in bold text while text in italics indicates the round in which that seed was eliminated.

1. (Switzerland) **Roger Federer (champion)**
2. (Argentina) Guillermo Coria (first round)
3. (Germany) Rainer Schüttler (first round)
4. (Argentina) David Nalbandian (first round)
5. (Australia) Mark Philippoussis (first round)
6. (United Kingdom) Tim Henman (first round)
7. (Thailand) Paradorn Srichaphan (second round)
8. (Netherlands) Sjeng Schalken (quarterfinals)

== Draw ==
Key

- Q = Qualifier
- WC = Wild card
- LL = Lucky loser
- Alt = Alternate
- ITF = ITF entry
- PR = Protected ranking
- SR = Special ranking
- SE = Special exempt
- JE = Junior exempt
- JR = Junior Accelerator Programme entrant
- CO = College Accelerator Programme entrant
- NG = Next Gen Accelerator Program entrant
- w/o = Walkover
- r = Retired
- d = Defaulted

First round
1	(Switzerland) **R Federer**	**7^{7}**	**7^{7}**
WC	(Russia) M Safin	6^{2}	6^{4}
(Spain) **T Robredo**	**6**	**6**
(Sweden) J Björkman	4	4
(Romania) **A Pavel**	**6**	2	**7**
(Czech Republic) B Ulihrach	1	**6**	5
Q	(Czech Republic) **T Zíb**	**6**	3	**7^{7}**
6	(United Kingdom) T Henman	4	**6**	6^{4}
4	(Argentina) D Nalbandian	3	4
(Finland) **J Nieminen**	**6**	**6**
(France) **G Carraz**	**6**	**6**
WC	(United Arab Emirates) O Bahrouzyan	0	0
(France) **F Santoro**	**6**	6^{7}	**6**
(Spain) A Martín	3	**7^{9}**	4
(Armenia) S Sargsian	3	1
8	(Netherlands) **S Schalken**	**6**	**6**
7	(Thailand) **P Srichaphan**	4
(Slovakia) D Hrbatý	3^{r}
Q	(Italy) M Dell'Acqua	3	**6**	4
(Croatia) **I Ljubičić**	**6**	3	**6**
(Spain) **F López**	**6**	**6**
(Russia) N Davydenko	4	3
Q	(Germany) **P Kohlschreiber**	3	**6**	**6**
3	(Germany) R Schüttler	**6**	4	4
5	(Australia) M Philippoussis	2	6^{8}
(Belgium) **O Rochus**	**6**	**7^{10}**
(Belarus) M Mirnyi	3	6^{6}
(Spain) **R Nadal**	**6**	**7^{8}**
WC	(United Arab Emirates) M Ghareeb	6^{5}	**6**	6^{6}
Q	(Netherlands) **D van Scheppingen**	**7^{7}**	3	**7^{8}**
(Russia) **M Youzhny**	4	**6**	**6**
2	(Argentina) G Coria	**6**	3	4

Second round
1	(Switzerland) **R Federer**	**6**	**6**
(Spain) T Robredo	3	4
(Romania) **A Pavel**	**7**	1	**6**
Q	(Czech Republic) T Zíb	5	**6**	1
(Finland) **J Nieminen**	**7^{7}**	**6**
(France) G Carraz	6^{3}	3
(France) F Santoro	**7**	4	4
8	(Netherlands) **S Schalken**	5	**6**	**6**
7	(Thailand) P Srichaphan	6^{6}	**6**	5
(Croatia) **I Ljubičić**	**7^{8}**	4	**7**
(Spain) **F López**	**6**	**6**
Q	(Germany) P Kohlschreiber	3	4
(Belgium) O Rochus	3	5
(Spain) **R Nadal**	**6**	**7**
Q	(Netherlands) D van Scheppingen	4	5
(Russia) **M Youzhny**	**6**	**7**

Quarterfinals
1	(Switzerland) **R Federer**	**6**	**6**
(Romania) A Pavel	3	3
(Finland) **J Nieminen**	**6**	**6**
8	(Netherlands) S Schalken	3	3
(Croatia) I Ljubičić	4	6^{4}
(Spain) **F López**	**6**	**7^{7}**
(Spain) R Nadal	2	**6**	1
(Russia) **M Youzhny**	**6**	1	**6**

Semifinals
1	(Switzerland) **R Federer**	**7^{9}**	**6**
(Finland) J Nieminen	6^{7}	2
(Spain) **F López**	**6**	4	**6**
(Russia) M Youzhny	4	**6**	4

Final
1	(Switzerland) **Roger Federer**	4	**6**	**6**
(Spain) Feliciano López	**6**	1	2
