= 2005 Dubai Tennis Championships – Men's doubles =

Men's doubles
- 2005 Dubai Tennis Championships
- Final date: February 21 – March 7

Final
- Champion: (Czech Republic) Martin Damm (Czech Republic) Radek Štěpánek
- Runner-up: (Sweden) Jonas Björkman (France) Fabrice Santoro
- Score: 6–2, 6–4

Details
- Draw: 16
- Seeds: 4

Events
Singles	men	women
Doubles	men	women
← 2004 ·	Dubai Tennis Championships	· 2006 →

2005 Dubai Tennis Championships. Mahesh Bhupathi and Fabrice Santoro were the defending champions. Bhupathi partnered with Todd Woodbridge, losing in the semifinals. Santoro partnered with Jonas Björkman, finishing runner-up.

Martin Damm and Radek Štěpánek won in the final 6–2, 6–4, against Jonas Björkman and Fabrice Santoro.

== Seeds ==
1. (The Bahamas) Mark Knowles / (Canada) Daniel Nestor (quarterfinals)
2. (Zimbabwe) Wayne Black / (Zimbabwe) Kevin Ullyett (first round)
3. (India) Mahesh Bhupathi / (Australia) Todd Woodbridge (semifinals)
4. (Sweden) Jonas Björkman / (France) Fabrice Santoro (final)

== Draw ==
=== Key ===
- Q = Qualifier
- WC = Wild card
- LL = Lucky loser
- Alt = Alternate
- SE = Special exempt
- PR = Protected ranking
- ITF = ITF entry
- JE = Junior exempt
- w/o = Walkover
- r = Retired
- d = Defaulted
- SR = Special ranking

=== Draw ===
First round
1	(The Bahamas) M Knowles (Canada) D Nestor	6	6
WC	(United Arab Emirates) O Bahrouzyan (Morocco) Y El Aynaoui	1	1
(Czech Republic) M Damm (Czech Republic) R Štěpánek	6	6
(Spain) F López (Spain) F Verdasco	3	4
3	(India) M Bhupathi (Australia) T Woodbridge	6	6
Alt	(Czech Republic) P Pála (Belgium) O Rochus	1	2
(Slovakia) D Hrbatý (Sweden) T Johansson	6^{4}	6	4
(Germany) R Schüttler (Russia) M Youzhny	7^{7}	4	6
(Croatia) I Ljubičić (Russia) M Safin	4	5
(Czech Republic) C Suk (Czech Republic) P Vízner	6	7
WC	(Kuwait) M al Ghareeb (Russia) D Sitak	3	3
4	(Sweden) J Björkman (France) F Santoro	6	6
(Czech Republic) T Berdych (Germany) N Kiefer	7^{10}	6
(India) L Paes (Serbia and Montenegro) N Zimonjić	6^{8}	2
(Russia) I Andreev (Russia) N Davydenko	7	6
2	(Zimbabwe) W Black (Zimbabwe) K Ullyett	5	4

Quarterfinals
1	(The Bahamas) M Knowles (Canada) D Nestor	4	4
(Czech Republic) M Damm (Czech Republic) R Štěpánek	6	6
3	(India) M Bhupathi (Australia) T Woodbridge	4	6	6
(Germany) R Schüttler (Russia) M Youzhny	6	4	2
(Czech Republic) C Suk (Czech Republic) P Vízner	6^{3}	4
4	(Sweden) J Björkman (France) F Santoro	7^{7}	6
(Czech Republic) T Berdych (Germany) N Kiefer	6	6^{7}	6
(Russia) I Andreev (Russia) N Davydenko	3	7^{9}	3

Semifinals
(Czech Republic) M Damm (Czech Republic) R Štěpánek	6^{3}	6	6
3	(India) M Bhupathi (Australia) T Woodbridge	7^{7}	2	4
4	(Sweden) J Björkman (France) F Santoro	7^{7}	7^{7}
(Czech Republic) T Berdych (Germany) N Kiefer	6^{4}	6^{5}

Final
(Czech Republic) M Damm (Czech Republic) R Štěpánek	6	6
4	(Sweden) J Björkman (France) F Santoro	2	4
