= 2004 J&S Cup – Singles =

Singles
- 2004 J&S Cup

Final
- Champion: (United States) Venus Williams
- Runner-up: (Russia) Svetlana Kuznetsova
- Score: 6–1, 6–4

Details
- Draw: 28
- Seeds: 8

Events
Singles	Doubles
← 2003 ·	J&S Cup	· 2005 →

Amélie Mauresmo was the defending champion, but lost in the quarterfinals to Francesca Schiavone

== Seeds ==
The top four seeds received a bye into the second round.

1. (France) Amélie Mauresmo (quarterfinals)
2. (United States) Venus Williams (champion)
3. (Russia) Vera Zvonareva (semifinals)
4. (Russia) Svetlana Kuznetsova (final)
5. (Argentina) Paola Suárez (withdrew due to low back pain)
6. (Italy) Silvia Farina Elia (quarterfinals)
7. (Switzerland) Patty Schnyder (second round)
8. (Israel) Anna Smashnova-Pistolesi (quarterfinals)
9. (Italy) Francesca Schiavone (semifinals)

== Main draw ==
=== Key ===
- Q = Qualifier
- WC = Wild card
- LL = Lucky loser
- Alt = Alternate
- SE = Special exempt
- PR = Protected ranking
- ITF = ITF entry
- JE = Junior exempt
- w/o = Walkover
- r = Retired
- d = Defaulted
- SR = Special ranking

=== Finals ===
Semifinals
9	(Italy) Francesca Schiavone	3	2
4	(Russia) Svetlana Kuznetsova	6	6
3	(Russia) Vera Zvonareva	3	5
2	(United States) Venus Williams	6	7

Final
4	(Russia) Svetlana Kuznetsova	1	4
2	(United States) Venus Williams	6	6

=== Top half ===
First round
(Argentina) G Dulko	2	2
(Greece) E Daniilidou	6	6
(Russia) E Bovina	4	6	6
(Slovenia) K Srebotnik	6	3	1
(Slovenia) T Pisnik	3	0
9	(Italy) F Schiavone	6	6
Q	(Czech Republic) K Peschke	5	3
WC	(Russia) V Douchevina	7	6
WC	(Poland) M Domachowska	6	6
Q	(United States) K Schlukebir	4	0
(Czech Republic) D Chládková	4	1
6	(Italy) S Farina Elia	6	6

Second round
1	(France) A Mauresmo	6	7
(Greece) E Daniilidou	2	6^{3}
(Russia) E Bovina	2	3
9	(Italy) F Schiavone	6	6
4	(Russia) S Kuznetsova	6	6
WC	(Russia) V Douchevina	0	1
WC	(Poland) M Domachowska	4	6	4
6	(Italy) S Farina Elia	6	4	6

Quarterfinals
1	(France) A Mauresmo	6	6^{2}	1
9	(Italy) F Schiavone	3	7	6
4	(Russia) S Kuznetsova	6	6
6	(Italy) S Farina Elia	1	4

Semifinals
9	(Italy) F Schiavone	3	2
4	(Russia) S Kuznetsova	6	6

=== Bottom half ===
First round
8	(Israel) A Smashnova-Pistolesi	6	6
(Switzerland) M-G Mikaelian	3	2
(Slovakia) D Hantuchová	6^{3}	6	6
(Spain) M Sánchez Lorenzo	7	3	3
LL	(Czech Republic) L Němečková	6	6
Q	(Slovakia) H Nagyová	3	2
7	(Switzerland) P Schnyder	6	6
Q	(Ukraine) E Tatarkova	3	4
(Russia) E Likhovtseva	3	1
(Bulgaria) M Maleeva	6	6
(Spain) A Medina Garrigues	6^{10}	4
(Colombia) F Zuluaga	7	6

Second round
8	(Israel) A Smashnova-Pistolesi	6	7
(Slovakia) D Hantuchová	4	5
LL	(Czech Republic) L Němečková	1	3
3	(Russia) V Zvonareva	6	6
7	(Switzerland) P Schnyder	7	2	3
(Bulgaria) M Maleeva	5	6	6
(Colombia) F Zuluaga	6	2	0
2	(United States) V Williams	4	6	6

Quarterfinals
8	(Israel) A Smashnova-Pistolesi	3	5
3	(Russia) V Zvonareva	6	7
(Bulgaria) M Maleeva	1	0
2	(United States) V Williams	6	6

Semifinals
3	(Russia) V Zvonareva	3	2
2	(United States) V Williams	6	6
