= 2003 Wismilak International =

- Date: 8–14 September
- Edition: 9th
- Category: Tier III
- Draw: 30S / 16D
- Prize money: $225,000
- Surface: Hard / outdoor
- Location: Bali, Indonesia

Champions

Singles
- (Russia) Elena Dementieva

Doubles
- (Venezuela) María Vento-Kabchi (Indonesia) Angelique Widjaja
← 2002 ·	Wismilak International	· 2004 →

The 2003 Wismilak International was a women's tennis tournament played on outdoor hard courts in Bali, Indonesia that was part of the Tier III category of the 2003 WTA Tour. It was the ninth edition of the tournament and was held from 8 September through 14 September 2003. Second-seeded Elena Dementieva won the singles title and earned $35,000 first-prize money.

== Finals ==
=== Singles ===
(Russia) Elena Dementieva defeated (United States) Chanda Rubin, 6–2, 6–1

- It was Dementieva's 2nd singles title of the year and of her career.

=== Doubles ===
(Venezuela) María Vento-Kabchi / (Indonesia) Angelique Widjaja defeated (France) Émilie Loit / (Australia) Nicole Pratt, 7–5, 6–2
