= 2003 Wismilak International – Doubles =

Doubles
- 2003 Wismilak International

Final
- Champions: (Venezuela) María Vento-Kabchi (Indonesia) Angelique Widjaja
- Runners-up: (France) Émilie Loit (Australia) Nicole Pratt
- Score: 7–5, 6–2

Events
Singles	Doubles
← 2002 ·	Commonwealth Bank Tennis Classic	· 2004 →

Cara Black and Virginia Ruano Pascual were the defending champions, but none competed this year.

María Vento-Kabchi and Angelique Widjaja won the title by defeating Émilie Loit and Nicole Pratt 7–5, 6–2 in the final.

== Seeds ==
1. (Venezuela) María Vento-Kabchi / (Indonesia) Angelique Widjaja (champions)
2. (France) Émilie Loit / (Australia) Nicole Pratt (final)
3. (Switzerland) Emmanuelle Gagliardi / (Austria) Barbara Schett (first round)
4. (Federal Republic of Yugoslavia) Jelena Dokic / (United States) Ashley Harkleroad (first round)

== Draw ==
=== Key ===
- Q = Qualifier
- WC = Wild card
- LL = Lucky loser
- Alt = Alternate
- SE = Special exempt
- PR = Protected ranking
- ITF = ITF entry
- JE = Junior exempt
- w/o = Walkover
- r = Retired
- d = Defaulted
- SR = Special ranking

=== Draw ===
First round
1	(Venezuela) M Vento-Kabchi (Indonesia) A Widjaja	6	6
(China) Z Yan (China) J Zheng	4	2
(South Korea) Y-j Cho (South Korea) M-r Jeon	3	7^{7}	6
(Japan) A Morigami (Japan) S Obata	6	6^{3}	2
3	(Switzerland) E Gagliardi (Austria) B Schett	3	6	3
(Republic of Ireland) K Liggan (Spain) A Parra Santonja	6	1	6
WC	(Indonesia) L Andriyani (Indonesia) M Rosa	1	1
(Australia) T Musgrave (United States) A Spears	6	6
(Paraguay) R de los Ríos (Russia) D Safina	3	1
(Italy) T Garbin (Italy) F Pennetta	6	6
(Indonesia) W Prakusya (Thailand) T Tanasugarn	6	6
4	(Federal Republic of Yugoslavia) J Dokic (United States) A Harkleroad	1	3
Q	(Indonesia) Y Basuki (Indonesia) D Julianto	1	2
(Australia) E Dominikovic (Germany) AL Grönefeld	6	6
(China) T Li (China) T Sun	4	3
2	(France) É Loit (Australia) N Pratt	6	6

Quarterfinals
1	(Venezuela) M Vento-Kabchi (Indonesia) A Widjaja	6	7^{7}
(South Korea) Y-j Cho (South Korea) M-r Jeon	3	6^{0}
(Republic of Ireland) K Liggan (Spain) A Parra Santonja	6^{4}	3
(Australia) T Musgrave (United States) A Spears	7^{7}	6
(Italy) T Garbin (Italy) F Pennetta	4	3^{r}
(Indonesia) W Prakusya (Thailand) T Tanasugarn	6	2
(Australia) E Dominikovic (Germany) AL Grönefeld	2	2
2	(France) É Loit (Australia) N Pratt	6	6

Semifinals
1	(Venezuela) M Vento-Kabchi (Indonesia) A Widjaja	2	7	6
(Australia) T Musgrave (United States) A Spears	6	5	3
(Indonesia) W Prakusya (Thailand) T Tanasugarn	6	3	5
2	(France) É Loit (Australia) N Pratt	4	6	7

Final
1	(Venezuela) M Vento-Kabchi (Indonesia) A Widjaja	7	6
2	(France) É Loit (Australia) N Pratt	5	2
