= 2004 Dubai Tennis Championships – Men's doubles =

Men's doubles
- 2004 Dubai Tennis Championships

Final
- Champions: (India) Mahesh Bhupathi (France) Fabrice Santoro
- Runners-up: (Sweden) Jonas Björkman (India) Leander Paes
- Score: 6–2, 4–6, 6–4

Details
- Draw: 16
- Seeds: 4

Events
Singles	men	women
Doubles	men	women
← 2003 ·	Dubai Tennis Championships	· 2005 →

Leander Paes and David Rikl were the defending champions but only Paes competed that year with Jonas Björkman.

Björkman and Paes lost in the final 6–2, 4–6, 6–4 against Mahesh Bhupathi and Fabrice Santoro.

== Seeds ==
1. (India) Mahesh Bhupathi / (France) Fabrice Santoro (champions)
2. (Sweden) Jonas Björkman / (India) Leander Paes (final)
3. (The Bahamas) Mark Knowles / (Canada) Daniel Nestor (first round)
4. (Czech Republic) Martin Damm / (Czech Republic) Cyril Suk (first round)

== Draw ==
=== Key ===
- Q = Qualifier
- WC = Wild card
- LL = Lucky loser
- Alt = Alternate
- SE = Special exempt
- PR = Protected ranking
- ITF = ITF entry
- JE = Junior exempt
- w/o = Walkover
- r = Retired
- d = Defaulted
- SR = Special ranking

First round
1	(India) M Bhupathi (France) F Santoro	6	6
WC	(United Arab Emirates) M Ghareeb (Switzerland) I Heuberger	4	2
(Russia) N Davydenko (Spain) F López	6	6
(Belgium) O Rochus (Russia) M Safin	4	2
4	(Czech Republic) M Damm (Czech Republic) C Suk	6^{5}	2
(Czech Republic) P Pála (Czech Republic) P Vízner	7^{7}	6
(Croatia) I Ljubičić (Netherlands) S Schalken	6^{2}	0
(Czech Republic) T Cibulec (Czech Republic) L Friedl	7^{7}	6
WC	(United Arab Emirates) O Bahrouzyan (United Arab Emirates) N Mohammed	1	3
(Germany) M Kohlmann (Germany) R Schüttler	6	6
(Spain) R Nadal (Spain) T Robredo	5	7^{7}	6
3	(The Bahamas) M Knowles (Canada) D Nestor	7	6^{4}	1
(Australia) P Hanley (Serbia and Montenegro) N Zimonjić	6	3	7
(Slovakia) D Hrbatý (Austria) J Knowle	3	6	5
(Zimbabwe) W Black (Zimbabwe) K Ullyett	3	4
2	(Sweden) J Björkman (India) L Paes	6	6

Quarterfinals
1	(India) M Bhupathi (France) F Santoro	6	6
(Russia) N Davydenko (Spain) F López	1	4
(Czech Republic) P Pála (Czech Republic) P Vízner	6	7
(Czech Republic) T Cibulec (Czech Republic) L Friedl	4	5
(Germany) M Kohlmann (Germany) R Schüttler	6^{4}	5
(Spain) R Nadal (Spain) T Robredo	7^{7}	7
(Australia) P Hanley (Serbia and Montenegro) N Zimonjić	3	6	3
2	(Sweden) J Björkman (India) L Paes	6	3	6

Semifinals
1	(India) M Bhupathi (France) F Santoro	6	7^{7}
(Czech Republic) P Pála (Czech Republic) P Vízner	1	6^{4}
(Spain) R Nadal (Spain) T Robredo	3	4
2	(Sweden) J Björkman (India) L Paes	6	6

Final
1	(India) M Bhupathi (France) F Santoro	6	4	6
2	(Sweden) J Björkman (India) L Paes	2	6	4
