= 2003 Wismilak International – Singles =

Singles
- 2003 Wismilak International

Final
- Champion: (Russia) Elena Dementieva
- Runner-up: (United States) Chanda Rubin
- Score: 6–2, 6–1

Events
Singles	Doubles
← 2002 ·	Commonwealth Bank Tennis Classic	· 2004 →

Svetlana Kuznetsova was the defending champion, but chose not to participate in 2003.

Elena Dementieva won the title. She defeated Chanda Rubin 6–2, 6–1 in the final.

== Seeds ==
1. (United States) Chanda Rubin (final)
2. (Russia) Elena Dementieva (champion)
3. (Spain) Conchita Martínez (second round)
4. (Socialist Federal Republic of Yugoslavia) Jelena Dokić (first round)
5. (Thailand) Tamarine Tanasugarn (quarterfinals)
6. (Zimbabwe) Cara Black (withdrew)
7. (France) Émilie Loit (first round)
8. (South Korea) Cho Yoon-jeong (second round)
9. (United States) Ashley Harkleroad (first round)

== Draw ==
=== Key ===
- Q = Qualifier
- WC = Wild card
- LL = Lucky loser
- Alt = Alternate
- ITF = ITF entry
- PR = Protected ranking
- SR = Special ranking
- SE = Special exempt
- JE = Junior exempt
- JR = Junior Accelerator Programme entrant
- CO = College Accelerator Programme entrant
- NG = Next Gen Accelerator Program entrant
- w/o = Walkover
- r = Retired
- d = Defaulted

=== Finals ===
Semifinals
1	(United States) Chanda Rubin	6	6
(Japan) Saori Obata	4	3
(Venezuela) María Vento-Kabchi	2	5
2	(Russia) Elena Dementieva	6	7

Final
1	(United States) Chanda Rubin	2	1
2	(Russia) Elena Dementieva	6	6

=== Top half ===
First round
(United States) S Taylor	1	4
(Spain) M Sánchez Lorenzo	6	6
(Germany) A Barna	7	7
WC	(Indonesia) W Prakusya	5	6^{4}
(United States) J Craybas	6	6^{3}	2
8	(South Korea) Y-j Cho	4	7	6
4	(Socialist Federal Republic of Yugoslavia) J Dokić	5	3
(Italy) T Garbin	7	6
(Indonesia) A Widjaja	7	4	7
(Russia) D Safina	6^{4}	6	5
(Austria) B Schett	6^{2}	7	7
(Japan) A Morigami	7	5	6^{5}
(Japan) S Obata	6	6
9	(United States) A Harkleroad	3	2

Second round
1	(United States) C Rubin	6	6
(Spain) M Sánchez Lorenzo	2	2
(Germany) A Barna	6	1	6
8	(South Korea) Y-j Cho	3	6	3
(Italy) T Garbin	5	3
(Indonesia) A Widjaja	7	6
(Austria) B Schett	1	1
(Japan) S Obata	6	6

Quarterfinals
1	(United States) C Rubin	6	6
(Germany) A Barna	2	2
(Indonesia) A Widjaja	6	5	1
(Japan) S Obata	4	7	6

Semifinals
1	(United States) C Rubin	6	6
(Japan) S Obata	4	3

=== Bottom half ===
First round
7	(France) É Loit	6^{4}	5
Q	(Croatia) I Abramović	7	7
(Switzerland) E Gagliardi	6	6
WC	(United States) C Morariu	4	3
Q	(Paraguay) R de los Ríos	4	4
(Venezuela) M Vento-Kabchi	6	6
Q	(Spain) A Parra	1	6^{5}
3	(Spain) C Martínez	6	7
5	(Thailand) T Tanasugarn	6	6
(Australia) N Pratt	0	0
(Italy) F Pennetta	3	2
Q	(China) J Zheng	6	6
(Germany) A-L Grönefeld	6	6^{4}	6
LL	(China) T Sun	4	7	1

Second round
Q	(Croatia) I Abramović	1	5
(Switzerland) E Gagliardi	6	7
(Venezuela) M Vento-Kabchi	6	6
3	(Spain) C Martínez	1	3
5	(Thailand) T Tanasugarn	6	6
Q	(China) J Zheng	4	3
(Germany) A-L Grönefeld	4	1
2	(Russia) E Dementieva	6	6

Quarterfinals
(Switzerland) E Gagliardi	6	1	1
(Venezuela) M Vento-Kabchi	1	6	6
5	(Thailand) T Tanasugarn	4	2
2	(Russia) E Dementieva	6	6

Semifinals
(Venezuela) M Vento-Kabchi	2	5
2	(Russia) E Dementieva	6	7
