= 2005 Dubai Tennis Championships – Men's singles =

Men's singles
- 2005 Dubai Tennis Championships

Final
- Champion: (Switzerland) Roger Federer
- Runner-up: (Croatia) Ivan Ljubičić
- Score: 6–1, 6–7^{(6–8)}, 6–3

Details
- Draw: 32
- Seeds: 8

Events
Singles	men	women
Doubles	men	women
- Dubai Tennis Championships

Two-time defending champion Roger Federer clinched a third successive success at the event, defeating Ivan Ljubičić 6–1, 6–7^{(6–8)}, 6–3, in the final.

== Seeds ==
1. (Switzerland) Roger Federer (champion)
2. (Russia) Marat Safin (first round)
3. (United Kingdom) Tim Henman (quarterfinals)
4. (United States) Andre Agassi (semifinals)
5. (Spain) Tommy Robredo (semifinals)
6. (Russia) Nikolay Davydenko (quarterfinals)
7. (Russia) Mikhail Youzhny (quarterfinals)
8. (Croatia) Ivan Ljubičić (final)

== Draw ==
Key

- Q = Qualifier
- WC = Wild card
- LL = Lucky loser
- Alt = Alternate
- ITF = ITF entry
- PR = Protected ranking
- SR = Special ranking
- SE = Special exempt
- JE = Junior exempt
- JR = Junior Accelerator Programme entrant
- CO = College Accelerator Programme entrant
- NG = Next Gen Accelerator Program entrant
- w/o = Walkover
- r = Retired
- d = Defaulted

=== Finals ===
Semifinals
1	(Switzerland) Roger Federer	6	6
4	(United States) Andre Agassi	3	1
8	(Croatia) Ivan Ljubičić	6	6
5	(Spain) Tommy Robredo	4	3

Final
1	(Switzerland) Roger Federer	6	6^{6}	6
8	(Croatia) Ivan Ljubičić	1	7^{8}	3

=== Top half ===
First round
1	(Switzerland) R Federer	6^{5}	6	7^{7}
Q	(Czech Republic) I Minář	7^{7}	3	6^{5}
WC	(Spain) JC Ferrero	6	6
(Germany) F Mayer	3	4
(Morocco) Y El Aynaoui	0	1
(Germany) R Schüttler	6	6
(Sweden) T Johansson	6^{3}	1
7	(Russia) M Youhzny	7^{7}	6
4	(United States) A Agassi	6	7
(Czech Republic) R Štěpánek	4	5
(Thailand) P Srichaphan	2	6	3
(Spain) F López	6	3	6
(Slovakia) D Hrbatý	6	6
WC	(United Arab Emirates) O Bahrouzyan	0	4
(France) F Santoro	3	0
6	(Russia) N Davydenko	6	6

Second round
1	(Switzerland) R Federer	4	6	7^{8}
WC	(Spain) JC Ferrero	6	3	6^{6}
(Germany) R Schüttler	5	4
7	(Russia) M Youhzny	7	6
4	(United States) A Agassi	6	6
(Spain) F López	1	3
(Slovakia) D Hrbatý	5	3
6	(Russia) N Davydenko	7	6

Quarterfinals
1	(Switzerland) R Federer	6	7
7	(Russia) M Youhzny	3	5
4	(United States) A Agassi	6	7^{7}
6	(Russia) N Davydenko	4	6^{4}

Semifinals
1	(Switzerland) R Federer	6	6
4	(United States) A Agassi	3	1

=== Bottom half ===
First round
8	(Croatia) I Ljubičić	6	6
Q	(France) J-R Lisnard	1	1
Q	(Belarus) V Voltchkov	2	2
(Spain) F Verdasco	6	6
(Russia) I Andreev	6	7
Q	(Switzerland) M Chiudinelli	3	5
(United Kingdom) G Rusedski	6	6^{7}	4
3/WC	(United Kingdom) T Henman	4	7^{9}	6
5	(Spain) T Robredo	7^{7}	7^{8}
(Belgium) O Rochus	6^{5}	6^{6}
(Czech Republic) T Berdych	6	7^{7}
(Slovakia) K Beck	4	6^{4}
(South Korea) Lee H-t	7	6
(Sweden) R Söderling	5	4
(Germany) N Kiefer	7^{7}	6
2	(Russia) M Safin	6^{2}	4

Second round
8	(Croatia) I Ljubičić	6^{4}	6	7^{10}
(Spain) F Verdasco	7^{7}	4	6^{8}
(Russia) I Andreev	6^{5}	1
3/WC	(United Kingdom) T Henman	7^{7}	6
5	(Spain) T Robredo	6	6
(Czech Republic) T Berdych	2	4
(South Korea) Lee H-t	6	1	3
(Germany) N Kiefer	2	6	6

Quarterfinals
8	(Croatia) I Ljubičić	7	6
3/WC	(United Kingdom) T Henman	5	4
5	(Spain) T Robredo	6	6
(Germany) N Kiefer	4	4

Semifinals
8	(Croatia) I Ljubičić	6	6
5	(Spain) T Robredo	4	3
