= 2004 Dubai Tennis Championships – Women's singles =

Women's singles
- 2004 Dubai Tennis Championships

Final
- Champion: (Belgium) Justine Henin-Hardenne
- Runner-up: (Russia) Svetlana Kuznetsova
- Score: 7–6^{(7–3)}, 6–3

Details
- Draw: 28
- Seeds: 8

Events
Singles	men	women
Doubles	men	women
- Dubai Tennis Championships

Justine Henin-Hardenne was the defending champion and successfully defended her title, by defeating Svetlana Kuznetsova 7–6^{(7–3)}, 6–3 in the final.

== Seeds ==
The first four seeds received a bye into the second round.

1. (Belgium) Justine Henin-Hardenne (champion)
2. (United States) Venus Williams (quarterfinals)
3. (United States) Jennifer Capriati (second round)
4. (Russia) Anastasia Myskina (quarterfinals)
5. (Japan) Ai Sugiyama (semifinals)
6. (Serbia and Montenegro) Jelena Dokic (first round)
7. (Italy) Francesca Schiavone (first round)
8. (Spain) Conchita Martínez (quarterfinals)

== Draw ==
Key

- Q = Qualifier
- WC = Wild card
- LL = Lucky loser
- Alt = Alternate
- ITF = ITF entry
- PR = Protected ranking
- SR = Special ranking
- SE = Special exempt
- JE = Junior exempt
- JR = Junior Accelerator Programme entrant
- CO = College Accelerator Programme entrant
- NG = Next Gen Accelerator Program entrant
- w/o = Walkover
- r = Retired
- d = Defaulted

=== Finals ===
Semifinals
1	(Belgium) Justine Henin-Hardenne	6	6
(United States) Meghann Shaughnessy	4	2
5	(Japan) Ai Sugiyama	0	5
(Russia) Svetlana Kuznetsova	6	7

Final
1	(Belgium) Justine Henin-Hardenne	7^{7}	6
(Russia) Svetlana Kuznetsova	6^{3}	3

=== Top half ===
First round
(Thailand) T Tanasugarn	2	0^{r}
WC	(Tunisia) S Sfar	6	4
Q	(Italy) ME Camerin	5	6	6
(Russia) E Likhovtseva	7	1	0
Q	(Bosnia and Herzegovina) M Jugić-Salkić	3	2
8	(Spain) C Martínez	6	6
Q	(Russia) V Dushevina	4	4
(Spain) M Serna	6	6
(United States) M Shaughnessy	6	6
LL	(Hungary) A Kapros	1	2
(Hungary) P Mandula	6	6
6	(Serbia and Montenegro) J Dokic	1	2

Second round
1	(Belgium) J Henin-Hardenne	6	7
WC	(Tunisia) S Sfar	1	5
Q	(Italy) ME Camerin	2	2
8	(Spain) C Martínez	6	6
4	(Russia) A Myskina	6	6
(Spain) M Serna	1	4
(United States) M Shaughnessy	7^{7}	6
(Hungary) P Mandula	6^{1}	4

Quarterfinals
1	(Belgium) J Henin-Hardenne	6	6
8	(Spain) C Martínez	1	0
4	(Russia) A Myskina	6^{2}	6	3
(United States) M Shaughnessy	7^{7}	4	6

Semifinals
1	(Belgium) J Henin-Hardenne	6	6
(United States) M Shaughnessy	4	2

=== Bottom half ===
First round
5	(Japan) A Sugiyama	6	6
(Russia) L Krasnoroutskaya	2	3
WC	(Australia) N Pratt	7	7
Q	(China) J Zheng	5	5
(Slovenia) T Pisnik	6	3	2
WC	(Greece) E Daniilidou	3	6	6
7	(Italy) F Schiavone	4	4
(Russia) S Kuznetsova	6	6
(Germany) A Barna	2	6	7
(Bulgaria) M Maleeva	6	4	5
(Australia) A Molik	7^{7}	6
(Venezuela) M Vento-Kabchi	6^{3}	2

Second round
5	(Japan) A Sugiyama	6	6
WC	(Australia) N Pratt	2	2
WC	(Greece) E Daniilidou	6	7^{7}
3	(United States) J Capriati	4	6^{2}
(Russia) S Kuznetsova	6	6
(Germany) A Barna	4	3
(Australia) A Molik	3	4
2	(United States) V Williams	6	6

Quarterfinals
5	(Japan) A Sugiyama	6	6
WC	(Greece) E Daniilidou	1	3
(Russia) S Kuznetsova	6	6
2	(United States) V Williams	2	3

Semifinals
5	(Japan) A Sugiyama	0	5
(Russia) S Kuznetsova	6	7
