= 2003 J&S Cup – Singles =

Singles
- 2003 J&S Cup

Final
- Champion: (France) Amélie Mauresmo
- Runner-up: (United States) Venus Williams
- Score: 6-7^{(6–8)}, 6–0, 3–0, ret.

Details
- Draw: 28
- Seeds: 8

Events
Singles	Doubles
← 2002 ·	J&S Cup	· 2004 →

Elena Bovina was the defending champion, but chose not to participate that year.
Amélie Mauresmo won in the final against Venus Williams 6-7^{(6–8)}, 6–0, 3–0, retired due to straining an abdominal muscle.

== Seeds ==
1. (United States) Venus Williams (final)
2. (France) Amélie Mauresmo (champion)
3. (Slovakia) Daniela Hantuchová (second round)
4. (Socialist Federal Republic of Yugoslavia) Jelena Dokić (semifinals)
5. (Bulgaria) Magdalena Maleeva (first round)
6. (Greece) Eleni Daniilidou (second round)
7. (Israel) Anna Pistolesi (quarterfinals)
8. (Spain) ~~Conchita Martínez~~ (withdrew)
9. (Russia) ~~Elena Likhovtseva~~ (withdrew)
10. (Russia) Tatiana Panova (first round)

== Main draw ==
=== Key ===
- Q = Qualifier
- WC = Wild card
- LL = Lucky loser
- Alt = Alternate
- SE = Special exempt
- PR = Protected ranking
- ITF = ITF entry
- JE = Junior exempt
- w/o = Walkover
- r = Retired
- d = Defaulted
- SR = Special ranking

=== Finals ===
Semifinals
1	(United States) Venus Williams	6	7
(Czech Republic) Denisa Chládková	3	6^{5}
4	(Socialist Federal Republic of Yugoslavia) Jelena Dokić	5	2
2	(France) Amélie Mauresmo	7	6

Final
1	(United States) Venus Williams	7	0	0^{r}
2	(France) Amélie Mauresmo	6^{6}	6	3

=== Top half ===
First round
Q	(Slovakia) M Suchá	4	3
Q	(Czech Republic) Z Ondrášková	6	6
(Slovenia) K Srebotnik	2	3
(Italy) F Schiavone	6	6
LL	(Hungary) K Marosi	4	1
6	(Greece) E Daniilidou	6	6
(Colombia) F Zuluaga	6	6
WC	(Poland) J Sakowicz	3	2
(Croatia) I Majoli	1	4
(Czech Republic) D Chládková	6	6
Q	(Spain) A Parra	6^{0}	6	6
5	(Bulgaria) M Maleeva	7	4	1

Second round
1	(United States) V Williams	6	6
Q	(Czech Republic) Z Ondrášková	2	3
(Italy) F Schiavone	6	6
5	(Greece) E Daniilidou	1	1
3	(Slovakia) D Hantuchová	2	4
(Colombia) F Zuluaga	6	6
(Czech Republic) D Chládková	6	7
Q	(Spain) A Parra	1	5

Quarterfinals
1	(United States) V Williams	2	6	6
(Italy) F Schiavone	6	3	3
(Colombia) F Zuluaga	5	5
(Czech Republic) D Chládková	7	7

Semifinals
1	(United States) V Williams	6	7
(Czech Republic) D Chládková	3	6^{5}

=== Bottom half ===
First round
10	(Russia) T Panova	2	1
Q	(Czech Republic) S Kleinová	6	6
(Spain) M Serna	6	3	7
(Czech Republic) I Benešová	2	6	5
(Switzerland) M Casanova	4	6	6
(Paraguay) R Neffa-de los Ríos	6	4	3
7	(Israel) A Pistolesi	6	6
(Austria) B Schett	4	2
(United States) J Craybas	7	6
(Germany) A Barna	6^{4}	4
WC	(Poland) M Domachowska	3	6	1
LL	(Czech Republic) R Voráčová	6	3	6

Second round
Q	(Czech Republic) S Kleinová	6	1	2
(Spain) M Serna	4	6	6
(Switzerland) M Casanova	5	6^{12}
4	(Socialist Federal Republic of Yugoslavia) J Dokić	7	7
7	(Israel) A Pistolesi	6	7
(United States) J Craybas	0	5
LL	(Czech Republic) R Voráčová	6	2	0
2	(France) A Mauresmo	2	6	6

Quarterfinals
(Spain) M Serna	5	2
4	(Socialist Federal Republic of Yugoslavia) J Dokić	7	6
7	(Israel) A Pistolesi	6	4	3
2	(France) A Mauresmo	3	6	6

Semifinals
4	(Socialist Federal Republic of Yugoslavia) J Dokić	5	2
2	(France) A Mauresmo	7	6
