= 2005 Dubai Tennis Championships =

- Date: February 21 – March 7
- Edition: 13th
- Surface: Hard / Outdoor

Champions

Men's singles
- (Switzerland) Roger Federer

Women's singles
- (United States) Lindsay Davenport

Men's doubles
- (Czech Republic) Martin Damm / (Czech Republic) Radek Štěpánek

Women's doubles
- (Spain) Virginia Ruano / (Argentina) Paola Suárez
- Dubai Tennis Championships

The 2005 Dubai Duty Free Men's and Women's Tennis Championships was the 13th edition of this tennis tournament and was played on outdoor hard courts. The tournament was part of the International Series Gold of the 2005 ATP Tour and the Tier II series of the 2005 WTA Tour. It took place in Dubai, United Arab Emirates from February 21 through March 7, 2005.

== Finals ==
=== Men's singles ===
(Switzerland) Roger Federer defeated (Croatia) Ivan Ljubičić 6–1, 6–7^{(6–8)}, 6–3

=== Women's singles ===
(United States) Lindsay Davenport defeated (Serbia and Montenegro) Jelena Janković 6–4, 3–6, 6–4

=== Men's doubles ===
(Czech Republic) Martin Damm / (Czech Republic) Radek Štěpánek defeated (Sweden) Jonas Björkman / (France) Fabrice Santoro 6–2, 6–4

=== Women's doubles ===
(Spain) Virginia Ruano Pascual / (Argentina) Paola Suárez defeated (Russia) Svetlana Kuznetsova / (Australia) Alicia Molik, 6–7^{(7–9)}, 6–2, 6–1
