= 2005 Dubai Tennis Championships – Women's singles =

Women's singles
- 2005 Dubai Tennis Championships

Final
- Champion: (United States) Lindsay Davenport
- Runner-up: (Serbia and Montenegro) Jelena Janković
- Score: 6–4, 3–6, 6–4

Details
- Draw: 28
- Seeds: 8

Events
Singles	men	women
Doubles	men	women
- Dubai Tennis Championships

Justine Henin-Hardenne was the defending champion, but chose not to participate that year.

Lindsay Davenport won the final, beating Jelena Janković, 6–4, 3–6, 6–4.

== Singles results ==
=== Seeds ===
The top four seeds received a bye into the second round.

1. (United States) Lindsay Davenport (champion)
2. (United States) Serena Williams (semifinals, retired)
3. (Russia) Anastasia Myskina (quarterfinals)
4. (Russia) Svetlana Kuznetsova (second round)
5. (United States) Venus Williams (first round)
6. (Australia) Alicia Molik (first round)
7. (France) Nathalie Dechy (second round)
8. (Switzerland) Patty Schnyder (semifinals)

=== Draw ===
Key

- Q = Qualifier
- WC = Wild card
- LL = Lucky loser
- Alt = Alternate
- ITF = ITF entry
- PR = Protected ranking
- SR = Special ranking
- SE = Special exempt
- JE = Junior exempt
- JR = Junior Accelerator Programme entrant
- CO = College Accelerator Programme entrant
- NG = Next Gen Accelerator Program entrant
- w/o = Walkover
- r = Retired
- d = Defaulted

==== Finals ====
Semifinals
1	(United States) Lindsay Davenport	4	7	6
8	(Switzerland) Patty Schnyder	6	5	1
(Serbia and Montenegro) Jelena Janković	6	4
2	(United States) Serena Williams	0	3^{r}

Finals
1	(United States) Lindsay Davenport	6	3	6
(Serbia and Montenegro) Jelena Janković	4	6	4

==== Top half ====
First round
Q	(China) J Zheng	7^{7}	6
(Spain) A Medina Garrigues	6^{4}	2
(Japan) S Asagoe	3	4
WC	(Spain) C Martínez	6	6
Q	(Russia) V Dushevina	7^{7}	4	6^{4}
7	(France) N Dechy	6^{1}	6	7^{7}
Q	(France) M Bartoli	6	6
(Argentina) G Dulko	4	4
(Japan) A Sugiyama	6	6^{4}	2
Q	(China) N Li	1	7^{7}	6
(Bulgaria) M Maleeva	6^{1}	2
8	(Switzerland) P Schnyder	7^{7}	6

Second round
1	(United States) L Davenport	6	7
Q	(China) J Zheng	2	5
WC	(Spain) C Martínez	6	6
7	(France) N Dechy	1	2
3	(Russia) A Myskina	4
Q	(France) M Bartoli	2^{r}
Q	(China) N Li	3	6^{9}
8	(Switzerland) P Schnyder	6	7^{11}

Quarterfinals
1	(United States) L Davenport	6	6
WC	(Spain) C Martínez	1	4
3	(Russia) A Myskina	7^{7}	6^{2}	2
8	(Switzerland) P Schnyder	6^{0}	7^{7}	6

Semifinals
1	(United States) L Davenport	4	7	6
8	(Switzerland) P Schnyder	6	5	1

==== Bottom half ====
First round
5	(United States) V Williams	5	6^{6}
(Italy) S Farina Elia	7	7^{8}
(Serbia and Montenegro) J Janković	6	6
(Argentina) P Suárez	3	1
WC	(India) S Mirza	6^{2}	6	6
(Croatia) J Kostanić	7^{7}	4	1
6	(Australia) A Molik	6^{8}	2
(Slovakia) D Hantuchová	7^{10}	6
(Russia) E Likhovtseva	2	6	7^{7}
WC	(Tunisia) S Sfar	6	2	6^{5}
(Italy) F Schiavone	1	6	4
(Russia) E Bovina	6	3	6

Second round
(Italy) S Farina Elia	6	5	1
(Serbia and Montenegro) J Janković	4	7	6
WC	(India) S Mirza	6	6
4	(Russia) S Kuznetsova	4	2
(Slovakia) D Hantuchová	7	6
(Russia) E Likhovtseva	5	4
(Russia) E Bovina	6	1	4
2	(United States) S Williams	1	6	6

Quarterfinals
(Serbia and Montenegro) J Janković	6	6
WC	(India) S Mirza	2	2
(Slovakia) D Hantuchová	4	3
2	(United States) S Williams	6	6

Semifinals
(Serbia and Montenegro) J Janković	6	4
2	(United States) S Williams	0	3^{r}

== Qualifying ==
=== Seeds ===
1. (France) Marion Bartoli (qualified)
2. (Russia) Vera Douchevina (qualified)
3. (Australia) Samantha Stosur (second round)
4. (Italy) Maria Elena Camerin (second round)
5. (China) Li Na (qualified)
6. n/a
7. (Slovakia) Martina Suchá (first round)
8. (Serbia and Montenegro) Ana Ivanovic (qualifying competition)

=== Qualifiers ===
1. (France) Marion Bartoli
2. (Russia) Vera Douchevina
3. (China) Li Na
4. (China) Zheng Jie

=== Draw ===
==== First qualifier ====
First round
1	(France) Marion Bartoli	6	6
(France) Stéphanie Foretz	2	2
(Croatia) Silvija Talaja	6	6
(Ukraine) Yuliana Fedak	4	4
(Australia) Nicole Pratt	7	6
(Luxembourg) Anne Kremer	5	2
(Russia) Galina Voskoboeva	2	6	6
7	(Slovakia) Martina Suchá	6	2	4

Second round
1	(France) Marion Bartoli	6	6
(Croatia) Silvija Talaja	2	2
(Australia) Nicole Pratt	7	4	1
(Russia) Galina Voskoboeva	5	6	6

Qualifying competition
1	(France) Marion Bartoli	6	7
(Russia) Galina Voskoboeva	1	5

==== Second qualifier ====
First round
2	(Russia) Vera Douchevina	7	6
(Czech Republic) Lenka Němečková	5	1
(France) Stéphanie Cohen-Aloro	4	7	5
(Czech Republic) Libuše Průšová	6	5	7
(China) Li Ting	7^{7}	6^{5}	1
(Russia) Maria Kirilenko	6^{4}	7^{7}	6
WC	(Egypt) Heidi El Tabakh	1	2
8	(Serbia and Montenegro) Ana Ivanovic	6	6

Second round
2	(Russia) Vera Douchevina	1	6	6
(Czech Republic) Libuše Průšová	6	3	1
(Russia) Maria Kirilenko	5	1
8	(Serbia and Montenegro) Ana Ivanovic	7	6

Qualifying competition
2	(Russia) Vera Douchevina	6	6
8	(Serbia and Montenegro) Ana Ivanovic	4	3

==== Third qualifier ====
First round
3	(Australia) Samantha Stosur	6^{5}	7	7^{7}
(China) Sun Tiantian	7^{7}	5	6^{4}
(Russia) Tatiana Panova	1	2
(Zimbabwe) Cara Black	6	6
(Germany) Anca Barna	6	2	7^{7}
WC	(Germany) Vanessa Henke	3	6	6^{1}
WC	(Germany) Martina Müller	1	1
5	(China) Li Na	6	6

Second round
3	(Australia) Samantha Stosur	7^{8}	2	4
(Zimbabwe) Cara Black	6^{6}	6	6
(Germany) Anca Barna	3	5
5	(China) Li Na	6	7

Qualifying competition
(Zimbabwe) Cara Black	2	7^{10}	3
5	(China) Li Na	6	6^{8}	6

==== Fourth qualifier ====
First round
4	(Italy) Maria Elena Camerin	7^{7}	1
(Italy) Roberta Vinci	6^{1}	0^{r}
(China) Zheng Jie	6	6
(Czech Republic) Sandra Kleinová	1	4
(Spain) Virginia Ruano Pascual	1	6	6
(Belgium) Els Callens	6	3	4
WC	(Uzbekistan) Iroda Tulyaganova	2	3
Alt	(Venezuela) María Vento-Kabchi	6	6

Second round
4	(Italy) Maria Elena Camerin	3	2
(China) Zheng Jie	6	6
(Spain) Virginia Ruano Pascual	6	1	7^{8}
Alt	(Venezuela) María Vento-Kabchi	4	6	6^{6}

Qualifying competition
(China) Zheng Jie	3	6	7
(Spain) Virginia Ruano Pascual	6	4	5
