= 2004 Wismilak International – Doubles =

Doubles
- 2004 Wismilak International

Final
- Champions: (Russia) Anastasia Myskina (Japan) Ai Sugiyama
- Runners-up: (Russia) Svetlana Kuznetsova (Spain) Arantxa Sánchez Vicario
- Score: 6–3, 7–5

Details
- Draw: 16 (1WC/1Q/1PR)
- Seeds: 4

Events
Singles	Doubles
← 2003 ·	Commonwealth Bank Tennis Classic	· 2005 →

María Vento-Kabchi and Angelique Widjaja were the defending champions, but lost in quarterfinals to Svetlana Kuznetsova and Arantxa Sánchez Vicario.

Anastasia Myskina and Ai Sugiyama won the title by defeating Svetlana Kuznetsova and Arantxa Sánchez Vicario 6–3, 7–5 in the final.

== Seeds ==
1. (Russia) Anastasia Myskina / (Japan) Ai Sugiyama (champions)
2. (Venezuela) María Vento-Kabchi / (Indonesia) Angelique Widjaja (quarterfinals)
3. (Argentina) Gisela Dulko / (Venezuela) Milagros Sequera (semifinals, withdrew)
4. (Italy) Tathiana Garbin / (Australia) Nicole Pratt (semifinals)

== Draw ==
=== Key ===
- Q = Qualifier
- WC = Wild card
- LL = Lucky loser
- Alt = Alternate
- SE = Special exempt
- PR = Protected ranking
- ITF = ITF entry
- JE = Junior exempt
- w/o = Walkover
- r = Retired
- d = Defaulted
- SR = Special ranking

=== Draw ===
First round
1	(Russia) A Myskina (Japan) A Sugiyama	4	6	7^{8}
Q	(Germany) A Barna (Serbia and Montenegro) J Janković	6	1	6^{6}
(Spain) M Marrero (Spain) A Medina Garrigues	6	1	6
(Poland) K Jans (Poland) A Rosolska	3	6	4
3	(Argentina) G Dulko (Venezuela) M Sequera	6	6
(Republic of Ireland) C Curran (South Africa) N Grandin	0	1
WC	(Indonesia) AF Damayanti (Indonesia) S Mende	5	4
(Australia) C Dellacqua (Australia) N Sewell	7	6
PR	(Argentina) M Díaz Oliva (Australia) S Stone	6	0	r
(United States) A Augustus (United States) J Hopkins	4	6
(Japan) A Nakamura (Japan) S Obata	4	3
4	(Italy) T Garbin (Australia) N Pratt	6	6
(Poland) M Domachowska (Russia) G Voskoboeva	4	3
(Russia) S Kuznetsova (Spain) A Sánchez Vicario	6	6
(Italy) ME Camerin (Italy) F Pennetta	6	3	3
2	(Venezuela) M Vento-Kabchi (Indonesia) A Widjaja	3	6	6

Quarterfinals
1	(Russia) A Myskina (Japan) A Sugiyama	6	6
(Spain) M Marrero (Spain) A Medina Garrigues	1	2
3	(Argentina) G Dulko (Venezuela) M Sequera	6	6
(Australia) C Dellacqua (Australia) N Sewell	1	0
(United States) A Augustus (United States) J Hopkins	2	3
4	(Italy) T Garbin (Australia) N Pratt	6	6
(Russia) S Kuznetsova (Spain) A Sánchez Vicario	6	6
2	(Venezuela) M Vento-Kabchi (Indonesia) A Widjaja	3	4

Semifinals
1	(Russia) A Myskina (Japan) A Sugiyama	w/o
3	(Argentina) G Dulko (Venezuela) M Sequera
4	(Italy) T Garbin (Australia) N Pratt	2	3
(Russia) S Kuznetsova (Spain) A Sánchez Vicario	6	6

Final
1	(Russia) A Myskina (Japan) A Sugiyama	6	7
(Russia) S Kuznetsova (Spain) A Sánchez Vicario	3	5
