= 2005 Dubai Tennis Championships – Women's doubles =

Women's doubles
- 2005 Dubai Tennis Championships

Final
- Champions: (Spain) Virginia Ruano Pascual (Argentina) Paola Suárez
- Runners-up: (Russia) Svetlana Kuznetsova (Australia) Alicia Molik
- Score: 6–7^{(7–9)}, 6–2, 6–1

Events
Singles	men	women
Doubles	men	women
- Dubai Tennis Championships

Janette Husárová and Conchita Martínez were the defending champions, but Husárová did not compete this year. Martínez teamed up with Elena Likhovtseva and lost in quarterfinals to Daniela Hantuchová and Francesca Schiavone.

Virginia Ruano Pascual and Paola Suárez won the title by defeating Svetlana Kuznetsova and Alicia Molik 6–7^{(7–9)}, 6–2, 6–1 in the final.

== Seeds ==
1. (Spain) Virginia Ruano Pascual / (Argentina) Paola Suárez (champions)
2. (Russia) Svetlana Kuznetsova / (Australia) Alicia Molik (final)
3. (Zimbabwe) Cara Black / (South Africa) Liezel Huber (quarterfinals)
4. (Russia) Elena Likhovtseva / (Spain) Conchita Martínez (quarterfinals)

== Draw ==
Key

- Q = Qualifier
- WC = Wild card
- LL = Lucky loser
- Alt = Alternate
- ITF = ITF entry
- PR = Protected ranking
- SR = Special ranking
- SE = Special exempt
- JE = Junior exempt
- JR = Junior Accelerator Programme entrant
- CO = College Accelerator Programme entrant
- NG = Next Gen Accelerator Program entrant
- w/o = Walkover
- r = Retired
- d = Defaulted

=== Draw ===
First round
1	(Spain) V Ruano Pascual (Argentina) P Suárez	6	4	6
(Russia) A Myskina (Japan) A Sugiyama	3	6	3
WC	(Austria) D Klemenschits (Austria) S Klemenschits	3	3
(Argentina) G Dulko (Venezuela) M Vento-Kabchi	6	6
4	(Russia) E Likhovtseva (Spain) C Martínez	6	6
(United States) L Davenport (United States) C Morariu	3	1
WC	(Slovakia) D Hantuchová (Italy) F Schiavone	6	6
Q	(New Zealand) L Baker (Italy) F Lubiani	2	4
(France) N Dechy (Switzerland) P Schnyder	6	3	1
(China) Z Yan (China) J Zheng	4	6	6
(Italy) S Farina Elia (Croatia) J Kostanić	0	7	2
3	(Zimbabwe) C Black (South Africa) L Huber	6	5	6
(Australia) N Pratt (Australia) S Stosur	2	2
(China) T Li (China) T Sun	6	6
(Belgium) E Callens (Australia) B Stewart	4	2
2	(Russia) S Kuznetsova (Australia) A Molik	6	6

Quarterfinals
1	(Spain) V Ruano Pascual (Argentina) P Suárez	6	6
(Argentina) G Dulko (Venezuela) M Vento-Kabchi	2	4
4	(Russia) E Likhovtseva (Spain) C Martínez	3	3
WC	(Slovakia) D Hantuchová (Italy) F Schiavone	6	6
(China) Z Yan (China) J Zheng	6	6
3	(Zimbabwe) C Black (South Africa) L Huber	0	3
(China) T Li (China) T Sun	3	4
2	(Russia) S Kuznetsova (Australia) A Molik	6	6

Semifinals
1	(Spain) V Ruano Pascual (Argentina) P Suárez	5	6	7
WC	(Slovakia) D Hantuchová (Italy) F Schiavone	7	4	5
(China) Z Yan (China) J Zheng	5	4
2	(Russia) S Kuznetsova (Australia) A Molik	7	6

Final
1	(Spain) V Ruano Pascual (Argentina) P Suárez	6^{7}	6	6
2	(Russia) S Kuznetsova (Australia) A Molik	7^{9}	2	1
