= 2004 Wismilak International – Singles =

Singles
- 2004 Wismilak International

Final
- Champion: (Russia) Svetlana Kuznetsova
- Runner-up: (Germany) Marlene Weingärtner
- Score: 6–1, 6–4

Details
- Draw: 30 (2WC/4Q/1PR)
- Seeds: 8

Events
Singles	Doubles
← 2003 ·	Commonwealth Bank Tennis Classic	· 2005 →

Elena Dementieva was the defending champion, but did not compete this year.

Svetlana Kuznetsova won the title by defeating Marlene Weingärtner 6–1, 6–4 in the final.

== Seeds ==
The top two seeds received a bye into the second round.

1. (Russia) Anastasia Myskina (second round)
2. (Russia) Svetlana Kuznetsova (champion)
3. (Japan) Ai Sugiyama (first round)
4. (Russia) Nadia Petrova (semifinals)
5. (United States) Chanda Rubin (first round)
6. (Venezuela) María Vento-Kabchi (first round)
7. (Argentina) Gisela Dulko (quarterfinals)
8. (Serbia and Montenegro) Jelena Janković (first round)

== Draw ==
=== Key ===
- Q = Qualifier
- WC = Wild card
- LL = Lucky loser
- Alt = Alternate
- SE = Special exempt
- PR = Protected ranking
- ITF = ITF entry
- JE = Junior exempt
- w/o = Walkover
- r = Retired
- d = Defaulted
- SR = Special ranking

=== Finals ===
Semifinals
(Italy) Maria Elena Camerin	6	3	3
(Germany) Marlene Weingärtner	2	6	6
4	(Russia) Nadia Petrova	7^{7}	1	2
2	(Russia) Svetlana Kuznetsova	6^{1}	6	6

Final
(Germany) Marlene Weingärtner	1	4
2	(Russia) Svetlana Kuznetsova	6	6

=== Top half ===
First round
(Slovenia) T Pisnik	5	2
(Italy) ME Camerin	7	6
(Italy) F Pennetta	7^{7}	6
(Australia) N Pratt	6^{2}	4
WC	(Indonesia) AF Damayanti	3	1
7	(Argentina) G Dulko	6	6
3	(Japan) A Sugiyama	4	6^{1}
Q	(Japan) A Nakamura	6	7^{7}
(Germany) M Weingärtner	6	6
Q	(Poland) M Domachowska	3	4
(Puerto Rico) K Brandi	6	6
(Japan) S Obata	1	2
PR	(South Korea) Y-j Cho	7	6
6	(Venezuela) M Vento-Kabchi	5	1

Second round
1	(Russia) A Myskina	3	6	2
(Italy) ME Camerin	6	1	6
(Italy) F Pennetta	6	1	5
7	(Argentina) G Dulko	4	6	7
Q	(Japan) A Nakamura	5	3
(Germany) M Weingärtner	7	6
(Puerto Rico) K Brandi	2	6	3
PR	(South Korea) Y-j Cho	6	4	6

Quarterfinals
(Italy) ME Camerin	3	6	6
7	(Argentina) G Dulko	6	3	2
(Germany) M Weingärtner	6	5	6
PR	(South Korea) Y-j Cho	4	7	2

Semifinals
(Italy) ME Camerin	6	3	3
(Germany) M Weingärtner	2	6	6

=== Bottom half ===
First round
5	(United States) C Rubin	1	4
(Italy) T Garbin	6	6
(Spain) A Medina Garrigues	6^{5}	2
(France) M Bartoli	7^{7}	6
(Spain) M Marrero	6	5	6
(United States) J Craybas	4	7	1
(Japan) A Morigami	2	1^{r}
4	(Russia) N Petrova	6	3
8	(Serbia and Montenegro) J Janković	6	2	2
WC	(Indonesia) A Widjaja	4	6	6
(Germany) A Barna	2	7^{7}	6
Q	(Argentina) M Díaz Oliva	6	6^{5}	2
Q	(Australia) S Stosur	6	7^{7}
(Venezuela) M Sequera	2	6^{5}

Second round
(Italy) T Garbin	6	2
(France) M Bartoli	0	0^{r}
(Spain) M Marrero	5	1
4	(Russia) N Petrova	7	6
WC	(Indonesia) A Widjaja	6	4	6
(Germany) A Barna	4	6	2
Q	(Australia) S Stosur	4	4
2	(Russia) S Kuznetsova	6	6

Quarterfinals
(Italy) T Garbin	1	5
4	(Russia) N Petrova	6	7
WC	(Indonesia) A Widjaja	5	1
2	(Russia) S Kuznetsova	7	6

Semifinals
4	(Russia) N Petrova	7^{7}	1	2
2	(Russia) S Kuznetsova	6^{1}	6	6
