= 2004 Dubai Tennis Championships – Women's doubles =

Women's doubles
- 2004 Dubai Tennis Championships

Final
- Champions: (Slovakia) Janette Husárová (Spain) Conchita Martínez
- Runners-up: (Russia) Svetlana Kuznetsova (Russia) Elena Likhovtseva
- Score: 6–0, 1–6, 6–3

Events
Singles	men	women
Doubles	men	women
- Dubai Tennis Championships

Svetlana Kuznetsova and Martina Navratilova were the defending champions, but Navratilova did not compete this year.

Kuznetsova teamed up with Elena Likhovtseva and lost in the final to Janette Husárová and Conchita Martínez. The score was 6–0, 1–6, 6–3.

== Seeds ==
1. (South Africa) Liezel Huber / (Japan) Ai Sugiyama (quarterfinals)
2. (Russia) Svetlana Kuznetsova / (Russia) Elena Likhovtseva (final)
3. (Venezuela) María Vento-Kabchi / (Indonesia) Angelique Widjaja (first round)
4. (Slovakia) Janette Husárová / (Spain) Conchita Martínez (champions)

== Draw ==
Key

- Q = Qualifier
- WC = Wild card
- LL = Lucky loser
- Alt = Alternate
- ITF = ITF entry
- PR = Protected ranking
- SR = Special ranking
- SE = Special exempt
- JE = Junior exempt
- JR = Junior Accelerator Programme entrant
- CO = College Accelerator Programme entrant
- NG = Next Gen Accelerator Program entrant
- w/o = Walkover
- r = Retired
- d = Defaulted

=== Draw ===
First round
1	(South Africa) L Huber (Japan) A Sugiyama	2	6	6
(Russia) L Krasnoroutskaya (Russia) A Myskina	6	1	3
(United States) M Shaughnessy (Italy) R Vinci	6	6
(Estonia) M Ani (Czech Republic) L Průšová	2	2
4	(Slovakia) J Husárová (Spain) C Martínez	6	6
(China) Z Yan (China) J Zheng	3	4
Q	(Bosnia and Herzegovina) M Jugić-Salkić (Italy) M Santangelo	2	6^{8}
(France) C Dhenin (Italy) F Schiavone	6	7^{10}
(France) S Cohen-Aloro (Australia) N Pratt	2	6	6
WC	(Greece) E Daniilidou (Tunisia) S Sfar	6	2	3
(Croatia) J Kostanić (Slovakia) H Nagyová	6	6
3	(Venezuela) M Vento-Kabchi (Indonesia) A Widjaja	3	1
(Hungary) P Mandula (Austria) B Schett	7^{7}	3	6
(Australia) A Molik (Spain) M Serna	6^{4}	6	1
(China) T Li (China) T Sun	2	4
2	(Russia) S Kuznetsova (Russia) E Likhovtseva	6	6

Quarterfinals
1	(South Africa) L Huber (Japan) A Sugiyama	6	5	6^{5}
(United States) M Shaughnessy (Italy) R Vinci	3	7	7^{7}
4	(Slovakia) J Husárová (Spain) C Martínez	3	6	6
(France) C Dhenin (Italy) F Schiavone	6	0	1
(France) S Cohen-Aloro (Australia) N Pratt	4	2
(Croatia) J Kostanić (Slovakia) H Nagyová	6	6
(Hungary) P Mandula (Austria) B Schett
2	(Russia) S Kuznetsova (Russia) E Likhovtseva	w/o

Semifinals
(United States) M Shaughnessy (Italy) R Vinci	1	3
4	(Slovakia) J Husárová (Spain) C Martínez	6	6
(Croatia) J Kostanić (Slovakia) H Nagyová	4	6^{4}
2	(Russia) S Kuznetsova (Russia) E Likhovtseva	6	7^{7}

Final
4	(Slovakia) J Husárová (Spain) C Martínez	6	1	6
2	(Russia) S Kuznetsova (Russia) E Likhovtseva	0	6	3
