= 2004 Dubai Tennis Championships =

- Date: March 1 – March 7 (men); February 23 – February 28 (women)
- Edition: 11th (men) / 4th (women)
- Location: Dubai, United Arab Emirates
- Venue: Aviation Club Tennis Centre

Champions

Men's singles
- (Switzerland) Roger Federer

Women's singles
- (Belgium) Justine Henin-Hardenne

Men's doubles
- (India) Mahesh Bhupathi / (France) Fabrice Santoro

Women's doubles
- (Slovakia) Janette Husárová / (Spain) Conchita Martínez
- Dubai Tennis Championships

The 2004 Dubai Duty Free Men's and Women's Tennis Championships was a tennis tournament played on outdoor hard courts at the Aviation Club Tennis Centre in Dubai in the United Arab Emirates that was part of the International Series Gold of the 2004 ATP Tour and of Tier II of the 2004 WTA Tour. The men's tournament was held from March 1 through March 7, 2004 while the women's tournament was held from February 23 through February 28, 2004.

== Finals ==
=== Men's singles ===
(Switzerland) Roger Federer defeated (Spain) Feliciano López 4–6, 6–1, 6–2

- It was Federer's 2nd title of the year and the 19th of his career.

=== Women's singles ===
(Belgium) Justine Henin-Hardenne defeated (Russia) Svetlana Kuznetsova 7–6^{(7–3)}, 6–3

- It was Henin-Hardenne's 3rd title of the year and the 19th of her career.

=== Men's doubles ===
(India) Mahesh Bhupathi / (France) Fabrice Santoro defeated (Sweden) Jonas Björkman / (India) Leander Paes 6–2, 4–6, 6–4

- It was Bhupathi's 2nd title of the year and the 33rd of his career. It was Santoro's 3rd title of the year and the 18th of his career.

=== Women's doubles ===
(Slovakia) Janette Husárová / (Spain) Conchita Martínez defeated (Russia) Svetlana Kuznetsova / (Russia) Elena Likhovtseva 6–0, 1–6, 6–3

- It was Husárová's 1st title of the year and the 16th of her career. It was Martínez's only title of the year and the 43rd of her career.
