= 2003 J&S Cup =

- Date: 28 April – 4 May
- Edition: 8th
- Category: Tier II
- Draw: 28S / 16D
- Location: Warsaw, Poland
- Venue: Warszawianka Tennis Centre

Champions

Singles
- (France) Amélie Mauresmo

Doubles
- (South Africa) Liezel Huber / (Bulgaria) Magdalena Maleeva
- J&S Cup

The 2003 J&S Cup was a Tier II event on the 2003 WTA Tour that run from April 28 - May 4, 2003. It was held in Warsaw, Poland, and was the 8th year that the event was staged. Amélie Mauresmo of France won her first Warsaw title and first overall of the year.

== Entrants ==
=== Seeds ===
Player	Nationality	Ranking*	Seeding
Venus Williams	United States	3	1
Amélie Mauresmo	France	7	2
Daniela Hantuchová	Slovakia	9	3
Jelena Dokić	(Socialist Federal Republic of Yugoslavia) Yugoslavia	10	4
Magdalena Maleeva	Bulgaria	14	5
Eleni Daniilidou	Greece	15	6
Anna Pistolesi	Israel	21	7
~~Conchita Martínez~~	Spain	25	8
~~Elena Likhovtseva~~	Russia	30	9
Tatiana Panova	Russia	31	10

- Seedings are based on the rankings of April 21, 2003.
- Conchita Martínez withdrew due to a right shoulder injury, so Elena Likhovtseva became the No. 9 seed, but she also withdrew due to illness, so Tatiana Panova of Russia become No. 10 seed.

=== Other entrants ===
The following players received wildcards into the main draw:

- (Poland) Marta Domachowska
- (Poland) Joanna Sakowicz

The following players received entry from the qualifying draw:

- (Czech Republic) Sandra Kleinová
- (Czech Republic) Zuzana Ondrášková
- (Spain) Arantxa Parra
- (Slovakia) Martina Suchá

The following players received entry as lucky losers:

- (Hungary) Katalin Marosi
- (Czech Republic) Renata Voráčová

== Finals ==
=== Singles ===
(France) Amélie Mauresmo defeated (United States) Venus Williams, 6-7(6), 6-0, 3-0, Ret.

=== Doubles ===
(South Africa) Liezel Huber / (Bulgaria) Magdalena Maleeva defeated (Greece) Eleni Daniilidou / (Argentina) Gisela Dulko, 3-6, 6-4, 6-2
