= 2004 in tennis =

This page covers all the important events in the sport of tennis in 2004. Primarily, it provides the results of notable tournaments throughout the year on both the ATP and WTA Tours, the Davis Cup, and the Fed Cup.

== The Slams ==
- 2004 Australian Open
- 2004 French Open
- 2004 Wimbledon Championships
- 2004 US Open

== Notable stories ==
=== Olympics and Chile ===
Held from August 15 to August 22 in Athens, Greece, it consisted of four events; men's singles, women's singles, men's doubles, and women's doubles. The standard 5th event, mixed doubles, was not part of these games. There were 170 participants (87 men and 83 women) from 52 countries. The events were held at the Athens Olympic Tennis Centre at the Athens Olympic Sports Complex. The surface was hardcourt, specifically DecoTurf, the same surface as used at the US Open in Flushing Meadow, New York. The Centre had 16 courts built specifically for the 2004 Olympics, with construction finished just before the opening of the Athens Olympics. There was a main court seating 6,000 fans for the Olympics, two show courts with seating for 3,200 seats during the Olympics, and 16 side courts with limited seating.

Chile won the most medals (three), two of which were gold, led by Nicolás Massú, who won the men's singles, and partnered by Fernando González, also helped Chile take gold in the doubles.

=== Russian breakthrough ===
The year 2004 was well known for the breakthrough of Russian players into the WTA Tour.

At the French Open, Anastasia Myskina became the first woman from Russia to win a Grand Slam singles title, by defeating compatriot Elena Dementieva in the final, 6–1, 6–2. A mere four weeks later, at Wimbledon, 17–year-old Maria Sharapova became the nation's second female Grand Slam winner, defeating two-time champion Serena Williams in the final, 6–1, 6–4, and becoming the third-youngest woman (after Lottie Dod and Martina Hingis) to win Wimbledon. Finally, at the US Open, Svetlana Kuznetsova became the nation's third consecutive winner of a Grand Slam singles title, defeating Dementieva in the final, 6–3, 7–5.

Other Russian players also made an impact on the WTA Tour that year. Nadia Petrova cracked the WTA's Top 10 for the first time, and also achieved her biggest result that year, defeating defending US Open champion Justine Henin-Hardenne in the fourth round, before losing to Kuznetsova in the quarter-finals. Vera Zvonareva also continued to improve on the Tour before injuries briefly derailed her career the following year.

The conclusion of the season culminated in Sharapova winning the 2004 WTA Tour Championships by repeating her Wimbledon victory over Serena Williams in the final, 4–6, 6–2, 6–4, after coming from 0–4 down in the final set.

Russia also won its first Fed Cup title.

== ITF ==
=== Grand Slam events ===
Men's singles

Championship	Champion	Finalist	Score in the final
Australian Open	(Switzerland) Roger Federer	(Russia) Marat Safin	7–6(7–3), 6–4, 6–2
French Open	(Argentina) Gastón Gaudio	(Argentina) Guillermo Coria	0–6, 3–6, 6–4, 6–1, 8–6
Wimbledon	(Switzerland) Roger Federer	(United States) Andy Roddick	4–6, 7–5, 7–6^{(7–3)}, 6–4
US Open	(Switzerland) Roger Federer	(Australia) Lleyton Hewitt	6–0, 7–6^{(7–3)}, 6–0

Women's singles

Championship	Champion	Finalist	Score in the final
Australian Open	(Belgium) Justine Henin-Hardenne	(Belgium) Kim Clijsters	6–3, 4–6, 6–3
French Open	(Russia) Anastasia Myskina	(Russia) Elena Dementieva	6–1, 6–2
Wimbledon	(Russia) Maria Sharapova	(United States) Serena Williams	6–1, 6–4
US Open	(Russia) Svetlana Kuznetsova	(Russia) Elena Dementieva	6–3, 7–5

Men's doubles

Championship	Champions	Finalists	Score in the final
Australian Open	(France) Michaël Llodra (France) Fabrice Santoro	(United States) Bob Bryan (United States) Mike Bryan	7–6^{(7–4)}, 6–3
French Open	(Belgium) Xavier Malisse (Belgium) Olivier Rochus	(France) Michaël Llodra (France) Fabrice Santoro	7–5, 7–5
Wimbledon	(Sweden) Jonas Björkman (Australia) Todd Woodbridge	(Austria) Julian Knowle (Serbia and Montenegro) Nenad Zimonjić	6–1, 6–4, 4–6, 6–4
US Open	(The Bahamas) Mark Knowles (Canada) Daniel Nestor	(India) Leander Paes (Czech Republic) David Rikl	6–3, 6–3

Women's doubles

Championship	Champions	Finalists	Score in the final
Australian Open	(Spain) Virginia Ruano (Argentina) Paola Suárez	(Russia) Svetlana Kuznetsova (Russia) Elena Likhovtseva	6–4, 6–3
French Open	(Spain) Virginia Ruano (Argentina) Paola Suárez	(Russia) Svetlana Kuznetsova (Russia) Elena Likhovtseva	6–0, 6–3
Wimbledon	(Zimbabwe) Cara Black (Australia) Rennae Stubbs	(South Africa) Liezel Huber (Japan) Ai Sugiyama	6–3, 7–6^{(7–5)}
US Open	(Spain) Virginia Ruano (Argentina) Paola Suárez	(Russia) Svetlana Kuznetsova (Russia) Elena Likhovtseva	6–4, 7–5

Mixed doubles

Championship	Champions	Finalists	Score in the final
Australian Open	(Russia) Elena Bovina (Serbia and Montenegro) Nenad Zimonjić	(United States) Martina Navratilova (India) Leander Paes	6–1, 7–6^{(7–3)}
French Open	(France) Tatiana Golovin (France) Richard Gasquet	(Zimbabwe) Cara Black (Zimbabwe) Wayne Black	6–3, 6–4
Wimbledon	(Zimbabwe) Cara Black (Zimbabwe) Wayne Black	(Australia) Alicia Molik (Australia) Todd Woodbridge	3–6, 7–6^{(10–8)}, 6–4
US Open	(Russia) Vera Zvonareva (United States) Bob Bryan	(Australia) Alicia Molik (Australia) Todd Woodbridge	6–3, 6–4

=== Olympics ===
Men's singles

Championship	Gold medalist	Silver medalist	Bronze medalist
Athens	(Chile) Nicolás Massú	(United States) Mardy Fish	(Chile) Fernando González

Women's singles

Championship	Gold medalist	Silver medalist	Bronze medalist
Athens	(Belgium) Justine Henin-Hardenne	(France) Amélie Mauresmo	(Australia) Alicia Molik

Men's doubles

Championship	Gold medalists	Silver medalists	Bronze medalists
Athens	(Chile) Fernando González (Chile) Nicolás Massú	(Germany) Nicolas Kiefer (Germany) Rainer Schüttler	(Croatia) Mario Ančić (Croatia) Ivan Ljubičić

Women's doubles

Championship	Gold medalists	Silver medalists	Bronze medalists
Athens	(China) Li Ting (China) Sun Tiantian	(Spain) Conchita Martínez (Spain) Virginia Ruano	(Argentina) Paola Suárez (Argentina) Patricia Tarabini

=== Davis Cup ===
2004 Davis Cup Champions
(Spain)
Spain
2nd title

Spain
3
Estadio de la Cartuja, Seville, Spain
3–5 December
Clay (indoors)

United States
2

			1	2	3	4	5
1	(Spain) (United States)	Carlos Moyà; Mardy Fish	6; 4	6; 2	6; 3
2	(Spain) (United States)	Rafael Nadal; Andy Roddick	6^{6} 7^{8}	6; 2	7^{8} 6^{6}	6; 2
3	(Spain) (United States)	Juan Carlos Ferrero / Tommy Robredo; Bob Bryan / Mike Bryan	0; 6	3; 6	2; 6
4	(Spain) (United States)	Carlos Moyà; Andy Roddick	6; 2	7^{7} 6^{2}	7^{7} 6^{5}
5	(Spain) (United States)	Tommy Robredo; Mardy Fish	6^{9} 7^{11}	2; 6

=== Fed Cup ===
2004 Fed Cup Champions
(Russia)
Russia
1st title

Russia
3
Ice Stadium Krylatskoe, Moscow, Russia
27–28 November
Carpet (indoors)

France
2

			1	2	3
1	(Russia) (France)	Svetlana Kuznetsova; Nathalie Dechy	6; 3	6^{5} 7^{7}	6; 8
2	(Russia) (France)	Anastasia Myskina; Tatiana Golovin	6; 4	7^{7} 6^{5}
3	(Russia) (France)	Anastasia Myskina; Nathalie Dechy	6; 3	6; 4
4	(Russia) (France)	Svetlana Kuznetsova; Tatiana Golovin	4; 6	1; 6
5	(Russia) (France)	Anastasia Myskina / Vera Zvonareva; Marion Bartoli / Émilie Loit	7^{7} 6^{5}	7; 5

=== Hopman Cup ===
2004 Hopman Cup Champions
(United States)
United States
3rd title

United States
2
Burswood Entertainment Complex, Perth, Australia
3–10 January
Hard (indoors)

Slovakia
1

			1	2	3
1	(United States) (Slovakia)	Lindsay Davenport; Daniela Hantuchová	6; 3	6; 1
2	(United States) (Slovakia)	James Blake; Karol Kučera	6; 4	4; 6	6; 7
3	(United States) (Slovakia)	Lindsay Davenport / James Blake; Daniela Hantuchová / Karol Kučera	6; 2	6; 3

== ATP/WTA ==
=== Year-End Championships ===
==== Men's singles ====
Championship	Champion	Finalist	Score in the final
Houston	(Switzerland) Roger Federer	(Australia) Lleyton Hewitt	6–3 6–2

==== Women's singles ====
Championship	Champion	Finalist	Score in the final
Los Angeles	(Russia) Maria Sharapova	(United States) Serena Williams	4–6, 6–2, 6–4

==== Men's doubles ====
Championship	Champion	Finalist	Score in the final
Houston	(United States) Bob Bryan (United States) Mike Bryan	(Zimbabwe) Wayne Black (Zimbabwe) Kevin Ullyett	4–6, 7–5, 6–4, 6–2

==== Women's doubles ====
Championship	Champions	Finalists	Score in the final
Los Angeles	(Russia) Nadia Petrova (United States) Meghann Shaughnessy	(Zimbabwe) Cara Black (Australia) Rennae Stubbs	7–5, 6–2

=== Masters Series/Tier I ===
==== Men's singles ====
Championship	Champion	Finalist	Score in the final
Indian Wells	(Switzerland) Roger Federer	(United Kingdom) Tim Henman	6–3, 6–3
Miami	(United States) Andy Roddick	(Argentina) Guillermo Coria	6–7^{(2–7)}, 6–3, 6–1, ret.
Monte Carlo	(Argentina) Guillermo Coria	(Germany) Rainer Schüttler	6–2, 6–1, 6–3
Rome	(Spain) Carlos Moyà	(Argentina) David Nalbandian	6–3, 6–3, 6–1
Hamburg	(Switzerland) Roger Federer	(Argentina) Guillermo Coria	4–6, 6–4, 6–2, 6–3
Toronto	(Switzerland) Roger Federer	(United States) Andy Roddick	7–5, 6–3
Cincinnati	(United States) Andre Agassi	(Australia) Lleyton Hewitt	6–3, 3–6, 6–2
Madrid	(Russia) Marat Safin	(Argentina) David Nalbandian	6–2, 6–4, 6–3
Paris	(Russia) Marat Safin	(Czech Republic) Radek Štěpánek	6–3, 7–6^{(7–5)}, 6–3

==== Women's singles ====
Championship	Champion	Finalist	Score in the final
Tokyo	(United States) Lindsay Davenport	(Bulgaria) Magdalena Maleeva	6–4, 6–1
Indian Wells	(Belgium) Justine Henin-Hardenne	(United States) Lindsay Davenport	6–1, 6–4
Miami	(United States) Serena Williams	(Russia) Elena Dementieva	6–1, 6–1
Charleston	(United States) Venus Williams	(Spain) Conchita Martínez	2–6, 6–2, 6–1
Berlin	(France) Amélie Mauresmo	(United States) Venus Williams	walkover
Rome	(France) Amélie Mauresmo	(United States) Jennifer Capriati	3–6, 6–3, 7–6^{(8–6)}
San Diego	(United States) Lindsay Davenport	(Russia) Anastasia Myskina	6–1, 6–1
Montreal	(France) Amélie Mauresmo	(Russia) Elena Likhovtseva	6–1, 6–0
Moscow	(Russia) Anastasia Myskina	(Russia) Elena Dementieva	7–5, 6–0
Zürich	(Australia) Alicia Molik	(Russia) Maria Sharapova	4–6, 6–2, 6–3

==== Men's doubles ====
Championship	Champions	Finalists	Score in the final
Indian Wells	(France) Arnaud Clément (France) Sébastien Grosjean	(Zimbabwe) Wayne Black (Zimbabwe) Kevin Ullyett	6–3, 4–6, 7–5
Miami	(Zimbabwe) Wayne Black (Zimbabwe) Kevin Ullyett	(Sweden) Jonas Björkman (Australia) Todd Woodbridge	6–2, 7–6^{(14–12)}
Monte Carlo	(United Kingdom) Tim Henman (Serbia and Montenegro) Nenad Zimonjić	(Argentina) Gastón Etlis (Argentina) Martín Rodríguez	7–5, 6–2
Rome	(India) Mahesh Bhupathi (Belarus) Max Mirnyi	(Australia) Wayne Arthurs (Australia) Paul Hanley	2–6, 6–3, 6–4
Hamburg	(Zimbabwe) Wayne Black (Zimbabwe) Kevin Ullyett	(United States) Bob Bryan (United States) Mike Bryan	6–4, 6–2
Toronto	(India) Mahesh Bhupathi (India) Leander Paes	(Sweden) Jonas Björkman (Belarus) Max Mirnyi	6–4, 6–2
Cincinnati	(The Bahamas) Mark Knowles (Canada) Daniel Nestor	(Sweden) Jonas Björkman (Australia) Todd Woodbridge	6–2, 3–6, 6–3
Madrid	(The Bahamas) Mark Knowles (Canada) Daniel Nestor	(United States) Bob Bryan (United States) Mike Bryan	6–3, 6–4
Paris	(Sweden) Jonas Björkman (Australia) Todd Woodbridge	(Zimbabwe) Wayne Black (Zimbabwe) Kevin Ullyett	6–3, 6–4

==== Women's doubles ====
Championship	Champions	Finalists	Score in the final
Tokyo	(Zimbabwe) Cara Black (Australia) Rennae Stubbs	(Russia) Elena Likhovtseva (Bulgaria) Magdalena Maleeva	6–0, 6–1
Indian Wells	(Spain) Virginia Ruano (Argentina) Paola Suárez	(Russia) Svetlana Kuznetsova (Russia) Elena Likhovtseva	6–1, 6–2
Miami	(Russia) Nadia Petrova (United States) Meghann Shaughnessy	(Russia) Svetlana Kuznetsova (Russia) Elena Likhovtseva	6–2, 6–3
Charleston	(Spain) Virginia Ruano (Argentina) Paola Suárez	(United States) Martina Navratilova (United States) Lisa Raymond	6–4, 6–1
Berlin	(Russia) Nadia Petrova (United States) Meghann Shaughnessy	(Slovakia) Janette Husárová (Spain) Conchita Martínez	6–2, 2–6, 6–1
Rome	(Russia) Nadia Petrova (United States) Meghann Shaughnessy	(Spain) Virginia Ruano (Argentina) Paola Suárez	2–6, 6–3, 6–3
San Diego	(Zimbabwe) Cara Black (Australia) Rennae Stubbs	(Spain) Virginia Ruano (Argentina) Paola Suárez	4–6, 6–1, 6–4
Montreal	(Japan) Shinobu Asagoe (Japan) Ai Sugiyama	(South Africa) Liezel Huber (Thailand) Tamarine Tanasugarn	6–0, 6–3
Moscow	(Russia) Anastasia Myskina (Russia) Vera Zvonareva	(Spain) Virginia Ruano (Argentina) Paola Suárez	6–3, 4–6, 6–2
Zürich	(Zimbabwe) Cara Black (Australia) Rennae Stubbs	(Spain) Virginia Ruano (Argentina) Paola Suárez	6–4, 6–4

=== ARAG World Team Cup ===
2004 ARAG World Team Cup Champions
(Chile)
Chile
2nd title

Chile
2
Rochusclub, Düsseldorf, Germany
16–22 May
Clay (outdoors)

Australia
1

			1	2	3
1	(Chile) (Australia)	Nicolás Massú; Mark Philippoussis	6; 3	6; 1
2	(Chile) (Australia)	Fernando González; Lleyton Hewitt	7; 5	6; 2
3	(Chile) (Australia)	Adrián García / Nicolás Massú; Wayne Arthurs / Paul Hanley	4; 6	4; 6

== Movies ==
- Wimbledon

== Tennis Hall of Fame ==
Class	Inductees	Category
Class of 2004	(United States) Dorothy Cheney	Player
Class of 2004	(Sweden) Stefan Edberg	Player
Class of 2004	(Germany) Stefanie Graf	Player

== See also ==
- Tennis at the 2004 Summer Olympics
