= 2004 US Open Series =

In tennis, the first edition of the US Open Series was contested in 2004.

== 2004 schedule ==
Legend
Grand Slam Event
ATP Masters 1000 and WTA Tier I

Week	Date	Men's Events	Women's Events
1	July 12 – July 18	Los Angeles; Mercedes Benz Cup; 2004 Champion: (Germany) Tommy Haas	Stanford; Bank of the West Classic; 2004 Champion: (United States) Lindsay Davenport
2	July 19 – July 25	Indianapolis; RCA Championships; 2004 Champion: (United States) Andy Roddick	Los Angeles; JPMorgan Chase Open; 2004 Champion: (United States) Lindsay Davenport
3	July 26 – August 1	Toronto; Canada Masters; 2004 Champion: (Switzerland) Roger Federer	San Diego; Acura Classic; 2004 Champion: (United States) Lindsay Davenport
4	August 2 – August 8	Cincinnati; Cincinnati Masters; 2004 Champion: (United States) Andre Agassi	Montreal; Rogers AT&T Cup; 2004 Champion: (France) Amélie Mauresmo
5	August 9 – August 15	No series event held this week	
6	August 16 – August 22	Washington, D. C. Legg Mason Tennis Classic; 2004 Champion: (Australia) Lleyton Hewitt	No series event held this week
7	August 23 – August 29	No series event held this week	New Haven; Pilot Pen Tennis; 2004 Champion: (Russia) Elena Bovina
8	August 30 – September 6	New York; US Open; 2004 Champion: (Switzerland) Roger Federer	New York; US Open; 2004 Champion: (Russia) Svetlana Kuznetsova

== Standings ==
=== ATP ===
Rank	Nationality	Player	Titles	Points	Result at US Open
1	AUS	Lleyton Hewitt	1	155	F
2	USA	Andy Roddick	1	155	QF
3	USA	Andre Agassi	1	123	QF

=== WTA ===
Rank	Nationality	Player	Titles	Points	Result at US Open
1	USA	Lindsay Davenport	3	100	SF
2	FRA	Amélie Mauresmo	1	100	QF
3	RUS	Elena Likhovtseva	0	70	
