= 2005 Italian Open – Women's doubles =

Women's doubles
- 2005 Italian Open

Final
- Champions: (Zimbabwe) Cara Black (South Africa) Liezel Huber
- Runners-up: (Russia) Maria Kirilenko (Spain) Anabel Medina Garrigues
- Score: 6–0, 4–6, 6–1

Details
- Draw: 28
- Seeds: 8

Events
| Singles | men | women |
| Doubles | men | women |
| ← 2004 · | Italian Open | · 2006 → |

Nadia Petrova and Meghann Shaughnessy were the defending champions, but had different outcomes. While Petrova decided to focus only on the singles tournament, Shaughnessy partnered with Anna-Lena Grönefeld and lost in semifinals to Maria Kirilenko and Anabel Medina Garrigues.

Cara Black and Liezel Huber won the title, defeating Kirilenko and Medina Garrigues 6–0, 4–6, 6–1 in the final.

== Seeds ==
The first four seeds received a bye into the second round.

1. (Spain) Virginia Ruano Pascual / (Argentina) Paola Suárez (second round, withdrew due to a right quadriceps strain on Ruano Pascual)
2. (Zimbabwe) Cara Black / (South Africa) Liezel Huber (champions)
3. (Russia) Elena Likhovtseva / (Russia) Vera Zvonareva (semifinals)
4. (Germany) Anna-Lena Grönefeld / (United States) Meghann Shaughnessy (semifinals)
5. (Australia) Bryanne Stewart / (Australia) Samantha Stosur (first round)
6. (Slovakia) Daniela Hantuchová / (Japan) Ai Sugiyama (quarterfinals)
7. (United States) Martina Navratilova / (Italy) Francesca Schiavone (first round)
8. (Argentina) Gisela Dulko / (Venezuela) María Vento-Kabchi (quarterfinals)

== Draw ==
=== Key ===
- Q = Qualifier
- WC = Wild card
- LL = Lucky loser
- Alt = Alternate
- ITF = ITF entry
- PR = Protected ranking
- SR = Special ranking
- SE = Special exempt
- JE = Junior exempt
- JR = Junior Accelerator Programme entrant
- CO = College Accelerator Programme entrant
- NG = Next Gen Accelerator Program entrant
- w/o = Walkover
- r = Retired
- d = Defaulted

=== Finals ===
Semifinals
(Russia) Maria Kirilenko (Spain) Anabel Medina Garrigues | 6 | 7
4 | (Germany) Anna-Lena Grönefeld (United States) Meghann Shaughnessy | 2 | 5
3 | (Russia) Elena Likhovtseva (Russia) Vera Zvonareva | 1 | 6 | 2
2 | (Zimbabwe) Cara Black (South Africa) Liezel Huber | 6 | 3 | 6

Final
(Russia) Maria Kirilenko (Spain) Anabel Medina Garrigues | 0 | 6 | 1
2 | (Zimbabwe) Cara Black (South Africa) Liezel Huber | 6 | 4 | 6

=== Top half ===
First round
Q | (Italy) S Errani (Italy) G Gabba | 2 | 1
(Russia) M Kirilenko (Spain) A Medina Garrigues | 6 | 6
LL | (Russia) E Linetskaya (India) S Uberoi | 2 | 2
(Czech Republic) D Chládková (Switzerland) E Gagliardi | 6 | 6
(France) S Testud (Italy) R Vinci | 1 | 0
6 | (Slovakia) D Hantuchová (Japan) A Sugiyama | 6 | 6
WC | (Italy) S Farina Elia (Italy) F Pennetta | 0 | 2
(Japan) S Asagoe (Spain) M Marrero | 6 | 6
(France) N Dechy (Spain) C Martínez | 6 | 6
(France) S Cohen-Aloro (Tunisia) S Sfar | 3 | 0
(France) C Dhenin (Romania) A Vanc | 4 | 7 | 6
5 | (Australia) B Stewart (Australia) S Stosur | 6 | 5 | 4

Second round
1 | (Spain) V Ruano Pascual (Argentina) P Suárez
(Russia) M Kirilenko (Spain) A Medina Garrigues | w/o
(Czech Republic) D Chládková (Switzerland) E Gagliardi | 0 | 2
6 | (Slovakia) D Hantuchová (Japan) A Sugiyama | 6 | 6
4 | (Germany) A-L Grönefeld (United States) M Shaughnessy | 6 | 6
(Japan) S Asagoe (Spain) M Marrero | 4 | 2
(France) N Dechy (Spain) C Martínez | 7 | 6
(France) C Dhenin (Romania) A Vanc | 5 | 2

Quarterfinals
(Russia) M Kirilenko (Spain) A Medina Garrigues | 2 | 6 | 6
6 | (Slovakia) D Hantuchová (Japan) A Sugiyama | 6 | 2 | 4
4 | (Germany) A-L Grönefeld (United States) M Shaughnessy | 6 | 3 | 6
(France) N Dechy (Spain) C Martínez | 4 | 6 | 1

Semifinals
(Russia) M Kirilenko (Spain) A Medina Garrigues | 6 | 7
4 | (Germany) A-L Grönefeld (United States) M Shaughnessy | 2 | 5

=== Bottom half ===
First round
8 | (Argentina) G Dulko (Venezuela) M Vento-Kabchi | 6 | 6
(Australia) L McShea (United States) A Spears | 4 | 0
WC | (Italy) Ad Serra Zanetti (Italy) An Serra Zanetti | 2 | 2
(Croatia) S Talaja (United States) M Washington | 6 | 6
(Chinese Taipei) J Lee (China) S Peng | 7^{8} | 6
(China) T Li (China) T Sun | 6^{6} | 3
7 | (United States) M Navratilova (Italy) F Schiavone | 4 | 2
(Italy) ME Camerin (Italy) T Garbin | 6 | 6
(Belgium) E Callens (Slovenia) T Križan | 4 | 5
(United States) J Russell (Italy) M Santangelo | 6 | 7
(China) Z Yan (China) J Zheng | 4 | 2
(Russia) A Jidkova (Ukraine) T Perebiynis | 6 | 6

Second round
8 | (Argentina) G Dulko (Venezuela) M Vento-Kabchi | 6 | 6
(Croatia) S Talaja (United States) M Washington | 0 | 2
(Chinese Taipei) J Lee (China) S Peng | 2 | 5
3 | (Russia) E Likhovtseva (Russia) V Zvonareva | 6 | 7
(Italy) ME Camerin (Italy) T Garbin | 2 | 3
(United States) J Russell (Italy) M Santangelo | 6 | 6
(Russia) A Jidkova (Ukraine) T Perebiynis | 2 | 4
2 | (Zimbabwe) C Black (South Africa) L Huber | 6 | 6

Quarterfinals
8 | (Argentina) G Dulko (Venezuela) M Vento-Kabchi | 6 | 4 | 2
3 | (Russia) E Likhovtseva (Russia) V Zvonareva | 3 | 6 | 6
(United States) J Russell (Italy) M Santangelo | 6 | 0 | 2
2 | (Zimbabwe) C Black (South Africa) L Huber | 3 | 6 | 6

Semifinals
3 | (Russia) E Likhovtseva (Russia) V Zvonareva | 1 | 6 | 2
2 | (Zimbabwe) C Black (South Africa) L Huber | 6 | 3 | 6
