= 2005 Italian Open – Men's singles =

Men's singles
- 2005 Italian Open

Final
- Champion: (Spain) Rafael Nadal
- Runner-up: (Argentina) Guillermo Coria
- Score: 6–4, 3–6, 6–3, 4–6, 7–6^{(8–6)}

Details
- Draw: 64 (4WC/8Q/1LL)
- Seeds: 16

Events
Singles	men	women
Doubles	men	women
← 2004 ·	Italian Open	· 2006 →

Rafael Nadal defeated Guillermo Coria in the final, 6–4, 3–6, 6–3, 4–6, 7–6^{(8–6)} to win the men's singles tennis title at the 2005 Italian Open. Nadal was making his tournament debut, and it was the first of an eventual record ten Italian Open titles. The final is considered one of the best matches in tournament history.

Carlos Moyá was the defending champion, but lost in the first round to Potito Starace.

== Seeds ==
A champion seed is indicated in bold text while text in italics indicates the round in which that seed was eliminated.

1. (United States) Andy Roddick (third round)
2. (Russia) Marat Safin (second round)
3. (Argentina) Gastón Gaudio (third round)
4. (United Kingdom) Tim Henman (third round)
5. (Spain) **Rafael Nadal (champion)**
6. (United States) Andre Agassi (semifinals)
7. (Spain) Carlos Moyà (first round)
8. (Argentina) David Nalbandian (first round)
9. (Argentina) Guillermo Coria (final)
10. (Sweden) Joachim Johansson (first round)
11. (Argentina) Guillermo Cañas (third round)
12. (Croatia) Ivan Ljubičić (third round)
13. (Spain) Tommy Robredo (first round)
14. (Russia) Nikolay Davydenko (first round)
15. (Czech Republic) Radek Štěpánek (quarterfinals)
16. (Sweden) Thomas Johansson (second round)

== Draw ==
=== Key ===
- Q = Qualifier
- WC = Wild card
- LL = Lucky loser
- Alt = Alternate
- ITF = ITF entry
- PR = Protected ranking
- SR = Special ranking
- SE = Special exempt
- JE = Junior exempt
- JR = Junior Accelerator Programme entrant
- CO = College Accelerator Programme entrant
- NG = Next Gen Accelerator Program entrant
- w/o = Walkover
- r = Retired
- d = Defaulted

=== Finals ===
Semifinals
9	(Argentina) **Guillermo Coria**	**7**	**7^{7}**
6	(United States) Andre Agassi	5	6^{0}
(Spain) David Ferrer	**6**	4	5
5	(Spain) **Rafael Nadal**	4	**6**	**7**

Final
9	(Argentina) Guillermo Coria	4	**6**	3	**6**	6^{6}
5	(Spain) **Rafael Nadal**	**6**	3	**6**	4	**7^{8}**

=== Top half ===
==== Section 1 ====
First round
1	(United States) **A Roddick**	**6**	**6**
(United Kingdom) G Rusedski	4	2
(Spain) **Á Costa**	**6**	**6**
Q	(Spain) A Montañés	4	4
Q	(Switzerland) **S Wawrinka**	**6**	**6**
(Czech Republic) T Berdych	1	4
(Spain) **F Verdasco**	**6**	**7**
14	(Russia) N Davydenko	3	5
9	(Argentina) **G Coria**	**7^{7}**	5	**6**
(Chile) F González	6^{5}	**7**	4
(Germany) **N Kiefer**	**6**	**6**
(Germany) T Haas	3	1
(Belarus) M Mirnyi	**7**	4	6^{6}
WC	(Italy) **D Sanguinetti**	5	**6**	**7^{8}**
(France) **F Santoro**	**6**	1	**6**
8	(Argentina) D Nalbandian	4	**6**	4

Second round
1	(United States) **A Roddick**	**6**	**7**
(Spain) Á Costa	4	5
Q	(Switzerland) S Wawrinka	6^{8}	2
(Spain) **F Verdasco**	**7^{10}**	**6**
9	(Argentina) **G Coria**	**6**	**6**
(Germany) N Kiefer	1	1
WC	(Italy) **D Sanguinetti**	**6**	**7**
(France) F Santoro	3	5

Third round
1	(United States) A Roddick	**7^{7}**	6^{3}	4
(Spain) **F Verdasco**	6^{1}	**7^{7}**	**6**
9	(Argentina) **G Coria**	**6**	**6**
WC	(Italy) D Sanguinetti	0	4

Quarterfinals
(Spain) F Verdasco	**6**	3	3
9	(Argentina) **G Coria**	3	**6**	**6**

==== Section 2 ====
First round
4	(United Kingdom) **T Henman**	**6**	**6**
(Brazil) G Kuerten	3	3
(Chile) **N Massú**	**6**	**6**
Q	(France) P-H Mathieu	0	4
(Brazil) R Mello	4	3
(Slovakia) **D Hrbatý**	**6**	**6**
Q	(France) **J Benneteau**	**6**	**6**
13	(Spain) T Robredo	1	0
12	(Croatia) **I Ljubičić**	**6**	**6**
(Belgium) O Rochus	3	3
(Denmark) K Carlsen	3	2
(France) **S Grosjean**	**6**	**6**
Q	(France) **R Gasquet**	**6**	**6**
(Thailand) P Srichaphan	0	2
WC	(Italy) A di Mauro	5	2
6	(United States) **A Agassi**	**7**	**6**

Second round
4	(United Kingdom) **T Henman**	**6**	**6**
(Chile) N Massú	3	2
(Slovakia) **D Hrbatý**	**7^{7}**	**6**
Q	(France) J Benneteau	6^{4}	0
12	(Croatia) **I Ljubičić**	**6**	3	**6**
(France) S Grosjean	4	**6**	3
Q	(France) R Gasquet	2	3
6	(United States) **A Agassi**	**6**	**6**

Third round
4	(United Kingdom) T Henman	3	**6**	3
(Slovakia) **D Hrbatý**	**6**	3	**6**
12	(Croatia) I Ljubičić	6^{4}	3
6	(United States) **A Agassi**	**7^{7}**	**6**

Quarterfinals
(Slovakia) D Hrbatý	3	3
6	(United States) **A Agassi**	**6**	**6**

=== Bottom half ===
==== Section 3 ====
First round
7	(Spain) C Moyà	4	6^{7}
WC	(Italy) **P Starace**	**6**	**7^{9}**
LL	(Spain) **A Martín**	**6**	1
(Germany) R Schüttler	0	0^{r}
(Germany) F Mayer	**6**	3	5
(Peru) **L Horna**	4	**6**	**7**
WC	(Italy) **A Seppi**	**6**	**6**
10	(Sweden) J Johansson	1	2
16	(Sweden) **T Johansson**	**6**	**6**
(Spain) F López	3	2
(France) C Saulnier	1	3
(Spain) **D Ferrer**	**6**	**6**
(Italy) **F Volandri**	**6**	**6**
(Morocco) Y El Aynaoui	0	2
(Slovakia) K Beck	4	3
3	(Argentina) **G Gaudio**	**6**	**6**

Second round
WC	(Italy) P Starace	3	**6**	3
LL	(Spain) **A Martín**	**6**	3	**6**
(Peru) **L Horna**	2	**6**	**6**
WC	(Italy) A Seppi	**6**	3	4
16	(Sweden) T Johansson	3	4
(Spain) **D Ferrer**	**6**	**6**
(Italy) F Volandri	4	2
3	(Argentina) **G Gaudio**	**6**	**6**

Third round
LL	(Spain) **A Martín**	**6**	**6**
(Peru) L Horna	1	3
(Spain) **D Ferrer**	**6**	**6**
3	(Argentina) G Gaudio	0	1

Quarterfinals
LL	(Spain) A Martín	2	**6**	5
(Spain) **D Ferrer**	**6**	3	**7**

==== Section 4 ====
First round
5	(Spain) **R Nadal**	**6**	**6**
(Russia) M Youzhny	0	2
Q	(Romania) **V Hănescu**	**6**	3	**6**
(Austria) J Melzer	4	**6**	3
Q	(Argentina) **J Mónaco**	**6**	**6**
(Sweden) R Söderling	3	2
(Romania) A Pavel	5	2
11	(Argentina) **G Cañas**	**7**	**6**
15	(Czech Republic) **R Štěpánek**	**6**	6^{5}	**6**
(Croatia) M Ančić	1	**7^{7}**	3
(France) M Llodra	4	4
(Argentina) **J I Chela**	**6**	**6**
Q	(Spain) **N Almagro**	3	**6**	**6**
(Russia) I Andreev	**6**	4	1
(Czech Republic) J Novák	**7^{7}**	1	1
2	(Russia) **M Safin**	6^{3}	**6**	**6**

Second round
5	(Spain) **R Nadal**	**6**	**6**
Q	(Romania) V Hănescu	1	1
Q	(Argentina) J Mónaco	0	0
11	(Argentina) **G Cañas**	**6**	**6**
15	(Czech Republic) **R Štěpánek**	**6**	4	**6**
(Argentina) J I Chela	4	**6**	1
Q	(Spain) **N Almagro**	**6**	**6**
2	(Russia) M Safin	4	3

Third round
5	(Spain) **R Nadal**	**6**	**6**
11	(Argentina) G Cañas	3	1
15	(Czech Republic) **R Štěpánek**	4	**6**	**6**
Q	(Spain) N Almagro	**6**	4	2

Quarterfinals
5	(Spain) **R Nadal**	5	**6**	**6**
15	(Czech Republic) R Štěpánek	**7**	1	1

== Qualifying ==
=== Qualifying seeds ===
1. (France) **Richard Gasquet (qualified)**
2. (Spain) Alberto Martín (qualifying competition, **lucky loser**)
3. (Croatia) Ivo Karlović (first round)
4. (United States) Kevin Kim (first round)
5. (Spain) Santiago Ventura (qualifying competition)
6. (Argentina) **Juan Mónaco (qualified)**
7. (France) **Paul-Henri Mathieu (qualified)**
8. (Spain) **Albert Montañés (qualified)**
9. (Czech Republic) Jan Hernych (first round)
10. (Netherlands) Peter Wessels (qualifying competition)
11. (Spain) Álex Calatrava (first round)
12. (Romania) **Victor Hănescu (qualified)**
13. (n/a)
14. (France) Jérôme Haehnel (first round)
15. (Spain) Óscar Hernández (qualifying competition)
16. (Australia) Wayne Arthurs (first round, retired)

=== Qualifiers ===
1. (France) **Richard Gasquet**
2. (Switzerland) **Stanislas Wawrinka**
3. (France) **Julien Benneteau**
4. (Romania) **Victor Hănescu**
5. (Spain) **Nicolás Almagro**
6. (Argentina) **Juan Mónaco**
7. (France) **Paul-Henri Mathieu**
8. (Spain) **Albert Montañés**

=== Lucky loser ===
1. (Spain) **Alberto Martín**

=== Qualifying draws ===
==== First qualifier ====
First round
1	**(France) Richard Gasquet**	**7**	**7^{8}**
(Spain) David Sánchez	5	6^{6}
WC	(Italy) Francesco Aldi	6^{6}	2
15	**(Spain) Óscar Hernández**	**7^{8}**	**6**

Qualifying competition
1	**(France) Richard Gasquet**	6^{3}	**6**	**6**
15	(Spain) Óscar Hernández	**7^{7}**	1	0

==== Second qualifier ====
First round
2	**(Spain) Alberto Martín**	**6**	**6**
(France) Jean-René Lisnard	3	2
**(Switzerland) Stanislas Wawrinka**	**6**	3	**6**
14	(France) Jérôme Haehnel	1	**6**	2

Qualifying competition
2	(Spain) Alberto Martín	3	**6**	4
**(Switzerland) Stanislas Wawrinka**	**6**	4	**6**

==== Third qualifier ====
First round
3	(Croatia) Ivo Karlović	4	3
**(France) Julien Benneteau**	**6**	**6**
**(Germany) Lars Burgsmüller**	**7^{7}**	**6**
11	(Spain) Álex Calatrava	6^{4}	1

Qualifying competition
**(France) Julien Benneteau**	**6**	**6**
(Germany) Lars Burgsmüller	4	1

==== Fourth qualifier ====
First round
4	(United States) Kevin Kim	4	1
**(Sweden) Jonas Björkman**	**6**	**6**
(France) Grégory Carraz	2	3
12	**(Romania) Victor Hănescu**	**6**	**6**

Qualifying competition
(Sweden) Jonas Björkman	6^{4}	**6**	3
12	**(Romania) Victor Hănescu**	**7^{7}**	4	**6**

==== Fifth qualifier ====
First round
5	**(Spain) Santiago Ventura**	**6**	**7^{7}**
(Switzerland) Ivo Heuberger	2	6^{5}
**(Spain) Nicolás Almagro**	**6**	**7**
Alt	(Romania) Răzvan Sabău	0	5

Qualifying competition
5	(Spain) Santiago Ventura	2	2
**(Spain) Nicolás Almagro**	**6**	**6**

==== Sixth qualifier ====
First round
6	**(Argentina) Juan Mónaco**	**7^{7}**	**6**
WC	(Italy) Federico Luzzi	6^{5}	4
WC	(Italy) Daniele Bracciali	2	2
10	**(Netherlands) Peter Wessels**	**6**	**6**

Qualifying competition
6	**(Argentina) Juan Mónaco**	**6**	3	**6**
10	(Netherlands) Peter Wessels	3	**6**	3

==== Seventh qualifier ====
First round
7	**(France) Paul-Henri Mathieu**	**6**	**6**
(Sweden) Thomas Enqvist	4	3
**(France) Gilles Simon**	**6**
16	(Australia) Wayne Arthurs	2	r

Qualifying competition
7	**(France) Paul-Henri Mathieu**	**6**	**6**
(France) Gilles Simon	4	2

==== Eighth qualifier ====
First round
8	**(Spain) Albert Montañés**	**7^{7}**	**6**
WC	(Italy) Fabio Fognini	6^{4}	0
**(France) Olivier Patience**	**6**	**6**
9	(Czech Republic) Jan Hernych	3	4

Qualifying competition
8	**(Spain) Albert Montañés**	3	**6**	3
(France) Olivier Patience	**6**	1	0^{r}
