= 2004 Italian Open – Women's singles =

Women's singles
- 2004 Italian Open

Final
- Champion: (France) Amélie Mauresmo
- Runner-up: (United States) Jennifer Capriati
- Score: 3–6, 6–3, 7–6^{(8–6)}

Details
- Draw: 56 (3WC/12Q)
- Seeds: 16

Events
Singles	men	women
Doubles	men	women
← 2003 ·	Italian Open	· 2005 →

Amélie Mauresmo defeated Jennifer Capriati in the final, 3–6, 6–3, 7–6^{(8–6)} to win the women's singles tennis title at the 2004 Italian Open. It was her second title of the season and the 12th of her career. This was Mauresmo’s fourth final in the last five years, finishing runner-up in 2000, 2001, and 2003.

Kim Clijsters was the reigning champion, but did not compete this year due to a wrist injury.

== Seeds ==
The first eight seeds received a bye into the second round.

1. (United States) Serena Williams (semifinals)
2. (France) Amélie Mauresmo (champion)
3. (Russia) Anastasia Myskina (second round)
4. (Russia) Nadia Petrova (second round)
5. (United States) Jennifer Capriati (final)
6. (Russia) Elena Dementieva (second round)
7. (Japan) Ai Sugiyama (third round)
8. (Russia) Vera Zvonareva (semifinals)
9. (Russia) Svetlana Kuznetsova (quarterfinals)
10. (Italy) Silvia Farina Elia (quarterfinals)
11. (Switzerland) Patty Schnyder (second round, retired due to a left upper arm strain)
12. (Argentina) Paola Suárez (third round)
13. (Spain) Conchita Martínez (third round)
14. (Italy) Francesca Schiavone (quarterfinals)
15. (Bulgaria) Magdalena Maleeva (first round)
16. (Israel) Anna Smashnova-Pistolesi (quarterfinals)

== Draw ==
=== Key ===
- Q = Qualifier
- WC = Wild card
- LL = Lucky loser
- Alt = Alternate
- ITF = ITF entry
- PR = Protected ranking
- SR = Special ranking
- SE = Special exempt
- JE = Junior exempt
- JR = Junior Accelerator Programme entrant
- CO = College Accelerator Programme entrant
- NG = Next Gen Accelerator Program entrant
- w/o = Walkover
- r = Retired
- d = Defaulted

=== Finals ===
Quarterfinals
PR/1	(United States) Serena Williams	7	6
9	(Russia) Svetlana Kuznetsova	5	0
16	(Israel) Anna Smashnova-Pistolesi	3	3
5	(United States) Jennifer Capriati	6	6
8	(Russia) Vera Zvonareva	6	6
14	(Italy) Francesca Schiavone	3	3
10	(Italy) Silvia Farina Elia	1	6	5
2	(France) Amélie Mauresmo	6	2	7

Semifinals
PR/1	(United States) Serena Williams	4	4
5	(United States) Jennifer Capriati	6	6
8	(Russia) Vera Zvonareva	2	3
2	(France) Amélie Mauresmo	6	6

Final
5	(United States) Jennifer Capriati	6	3	6^{6}
2	(France) Amélie Mauresmo	3	6	7^{8}

=== Top half ===
==== Section 1 ====
First round
PR	(France) S Testud	6	3	4
(Spain) M Sánchez Lorenzo	3	6	6
Q	(Russia) V Dushevina	6	5	6
(Zimbabwe) C Black	4	7	4
Q	(Madagascar) D Randriantefy	6	4	6
15	(Bulgaria) M Maleeva	3	6	4
9	(Russia) S Kuznetsova	6	4	6
(Australia) A Molik	2	6	4
Q	(Spain) M Marrero	6	7^{7}
Q	(Russia) T Panova	1	6^{3}
Q	(Argentina) G Dulko	1	4
(France) M Pierce	6	6

Second round
PR/1	(United States) S Williams	7	6
(Spain) M Sánchez Lorenzo	5	3
Q	(Russia) V Dushevina	0	3
Q	(Madagascar) D Randriantefy	6	6
9	(Russia) S Kuznetsova	6	6
Q	(Spain) M Marrero	0	4
(France) M Pierce	2	4
7	(Japan) A Sugiyama	6	6

Third round
PR/1	(United States) S Williams	6	6
Q	(Madagascar) D Randriantefy	1	3
9	(Russia) S Kuznetsova	6	3	7^{7}
7	(Japan) A Sugiyama	4	6	6^{4}

Quarterfinals
PR/1	(United States) S Williams	7	6
9	(Russia) S Kuznetsova	5	0

==== Section 2 ====
First round
(United States) L Granville	0	3
WC	(Italy) F Pennetta	6	6
WC	(Italy) ME Camerin	7	7
(Serbia and Montenegro) J Dokic	5	5
(Spain) M Serna	2	1
16	(Israel) A Smashnova-Pistolesi	6	6
12	(Argentina) P Suárez	5	6
(Colombia) F Zuluaga	7	1	r
(United States) J Craybas	4	2
Q	(France) T Golovin	6	6
Q	(Czech Republic) K Koukalová	7^{7}	2	4
(Venezuela) M Vento-Kabchi	6^{3}	6	6

Second round
4	(Russia) N Petrova	6	6^{4}	4
WC	(Italy) F Pennetta	1	7^{7}	6
WC	(Italy) ME Camerin	2	1
16	(Israel) A Smashnova-Pistolesi	6	6
12	(Argentina) P Suárez	6	7
Q	(France) T Golovin	2	5
(Venezuela) M Vento-Kabchi	2	1
5	(United States) J Capriati	6	6

Third round
WC	(Italy) F Pennetta	2	2
16	(Israel) A Smashnova-Pistolesi	6	6
12	(Argentina) P Suárez	2	2
5	(United States) J Capriati	6	6

Quarterfinals
16	(Israel) A Smashnova-Pistolesi	3	3
5	(United States) J Capriati	6	6

=== Bottom half ===
==== Section 3 ====
First round
(Russia) D Safina	6	6
WC	(Italy) M Santangelo	3	2
(Russia) E Bovina	6	1	6
(Slovenia) T Pisnik	3	6	0
(Germany) A Barna	4	1
11	(Switzerland) P Schnyder	6	6
14	(Italy) F Schiavone	6	6
(Australia) N Pratt	2	3
Q	(United States) S Reeves	6	3	6
(United States) L Raymond	4	6	2
(France) É Loit	6	3	6^{3}
(Russia) E Likhovtseva	4	6	7^{7}

Second round
8	(Russia) V Zvonareva	1	6	6
(Russia) D Safina	6	4	2
(Russia) E Bovina	3	7^{7}
11	(Switzerland) P Schnyder	6	6^{5}	r
14	(Italy) F Schiavone	6	6
Q	(United States) S Reeves	3	4
(Russia) E Likhovtseva	7	1	6
3	(Russia) A Myskina	5	6	3

Third round
8	(Russia) V Zvonareva	6	6
(Russia) E Bovina	3	0
14	(Italy) F Schiavone	6	6
(Russia) E Likhovtseva	1	3

Quarterfinals
8	(Russia) V Zvonareva	6	6
14	(Italy) F Schiavone	3	3

==== Section 4 ====
First round
Q	(Ukraine) T Perebiynis	4	5
(Russia) M Sharapova	6	7
Q	(Croatia) J Kostanić	4	6^{3}
(United States) M Shaughnessy	6	7^{7}
Q	(Austria) B Schett	4	4
10	(Italy) S Farina Elia	6	6
13	(Spain) C Martínez	6	6
Q	(Ukraine) Y Fedak	1	1
(Croatia) K Šprem	6	6
(Slovakia) D Hantuchová	2	2
(France) N Dechy	6	6
(Puerto Rico) K Brandi	4	4

Second round
6	(Russia) E Dementieva	1	4
(Russia) M Sharapova	6	6
(United States) M Shaughnessy	2	5
10	(Italy) S Farina Elia	6	7
13	(Spain) C Martínez	4	6	6
(Croatia) K Šprem	6	4	2
(France) N Dechy	5	2
2	(France) A Mauresmo	7	6

Third round
(Russia) M Sharapova	6^{3}	0
10	(Italy) S Farina Elia	7^{7}	6
13	(Spain) C Martínez	3	4
2	(France) A Mauresmo	6	6

Quarterfinals
10	(Italy) S Farina Elia	1	6	5
2	(France) A Mauresmo	6	2	7

== Qualifying ==
=== Qualifying seeds ===
1. (Croatia) Jelena Kostanić (qualified)
2. (Serbia and Montenegro) Jelena Janković (first round, retired due to a left low back strain)
3. (Czech Republic) Iveta Benešová (qualifying competition)
4. (Austria) Barbara Schett (qualified)
5. (Slovakia) Martina Suchá (qualifying competition)
6. (China) Zheng Jie (first round)
7. (Luxembourg) Claudine Schaul (qualifying competition)
8. (Slovenia) Katarina Srebotnik (first round)
9. (Slovakia) Ľubomíra Kurhajcová (first round)
10. (Argentina) Gisela Dulko (qualified)
11. (France) Marion Bartoli (qualifying competition)
12. (Czech Republic) Klára Koukalová (qualified)
13. (Ukraine) Julia Vakulenko (qualifying competition)
14. (France) Tatiana Golovin (qualified)
15. (Spain) Marta Marrero (qualified)
16. (Spain) Virginia Ruano Pascual (qualifying competition)
17. (Belgium) Els Callens (qualifying competition)
18. (Italy) Rita Grande (qualifying competition)
19. (Russia) Alina Jidkova (qualifying competition)
20. (Italy) Tathiana Garbin (first round)
21. (Russia) Vera Dushevina (qualified)
22. (United States) Samantha Reeves (qualified)
23. (Ukraine) Tatiana Perebiynis (qualified)
24. (Germany) Marlene Weingärtner (first round)

=== Qualifiers ===
1. (Croatia) Jelena Kostanić
2. (Ukraine) Yuliana Fedak
3. (France) Tatiana Golovin
4. (Austria) Barbara Schett
5. (Ukraine) Tatiana Perebiynis
6. (Russia) Tatiana Panova
7. (Spain) Marta Marrero
8. (United States) Samantha Reeves
9. (Madagascar) Dally Randriantefy
10. (Argentina) Gisela Dulko
11. (Russia) Vera Dushevina
12. (Czech Republic) Klára Koukalová

=== Qualifying draw ===
==== First qualifier ====
First round
1	(Croatia) Jelena Kostanić	7^{7}	6
(Italy) Antonella Serra Zanetti	6^{3}	1
(Italy) Roberta Vinci	6	6
20	(Italy) Tathiana Garbin	1	0

Qualifying competition
1	(Croatia) Jelena Kostanić	6	6
(Italy) Roberta Vinci	0	3

==== Second qualifier ====
First round
2	(Serbia and Montenegro) Jelena Janković	4	1^{r}
(Ukraine) Yuliana Fedak	6	3
(Germany) Julia Schruff	5	6^{2}
17	(Belgium) Els Callens	7	7^{7}

Qualifying competition
(Ukraine) Yuliana Fedak	6	6
17	(Belgium) Els Callens	4	3

==== Third qualifier ====
First round
3	(Czech Republic) Iveta Benešová	6	6
(Venezuela) Milagros Sequera	0	1
(Bosnia and Herzegovina) Mervana Jugić-Salkić	2	5
14	(France) Tatiana Golovin	6	7

Qualifying competition
3	(Czech Republic) Iveta Benešová	6	5	4
14	(France) Tatiana Golovin	1	7	6

==== Fourth qualifier ====
First round
4	(Austria) Barbara Schett	7	6
WC	(Italy) Valentina Sassi	5	0
WC	(Italy) Alice Canepa	7^{8}	2	2
19	(Russia) Alina Jidkova	6^{6}	6	6

Qualifying competition
4	(Austria) Barbara Schett	6	7
19	(Russia) Alina Jidkova	0	5

==== Fifth qualifier ====
First round
5	(Slovakia) Martina Suchá	6	6
(United States) Shenay Perry	2	4
(Australia) Samantha Stosur	2	7	2
23	(Ukraine) Tatiana Perebiynis	6	5	6

Qualifying competition
5	(Slovakia) Martina Suchá	4	1
23	(Ukraine) Tatiana Perebiynis	6	6

==== Sixth qualifier ====
First round
6	(China) Zheng Jie	6^{7}	5
(Russia) Tatiana Panova	7^{9}	7
WC	(Italy) Margot Torre	2	4
18	(Italy) Rita Grande	6	6

Qualifying competition
(Russia) Tatiana Panova	6	6
18	(Italy) Rita Grande	1	2

==== Seventh qualifier ====
First round
7	(Luxembourg) Claudine Schaul	2	6	6
WC	(Italy) Sara Errani	6	2	2
WC	(Italy) Giulia Casoni	1	4
15	(Spain) Marta Marrero	6	6

Qualifying competition
7	(Luxembourg) Claudine Schaul	4	3
15	(Spain) Marta Marrero	6	6

==== Eighth qualifier ====
First round
8	(Slovenia) Katarina Srebotnik	5	4
(Germany) Stephanie Gehrlein	7	6
(United States) Meilen Tu	5	3
22	(United States) Samantha Reeves	7	6

Qualifying competition
(Germany) Stephanie Gehrlein	4	3
22	(United States) Samantha Reeves	6	6

==== Ninth qualifier ====
First round
9	(Slovakia) Ľubomíra Kurhajcová	6^{3}	0
(Madagascar) Dally Randriantefy	7^{7}	6
(Italy) Adriana Serra Zanetti	6	6
24	(Germany) Marlene Weingärtner	4	4

Qualifying competition
(Madagascar) Dally Randriantefy	6	2	6
(Italy) Adriana Serra Zanetti	3	6	1

==== Tenth qualifier ====
First round
10	(Argentina) Gisela Dulko	6	6
(China) Sun Tiantian	3	2
(Czech Republic) Zuzana Ondrášková	3	2
16	(Spain) Virginia Ruano Pascual	6	6

Qualifying competition
10	(Argentina) Gisela Dulko	6	6
16	(Spain) Virginia Ruano Pascual	4	0

==== Eleventh qualifier ====
First round
11	(France) Marion Bartoli	6	6
WC	(Italy) Nathalie Viérin	3	1
(Czech Republic) Sandra Kleinová	4	2
21	(Russia) Vera Dushevina	6	6

Qualifying competition
11	(France) Marion Bartoli	6^{4}	0
21	(Russia) Vera Dushevina	7^{7}	6

==== Twelfth qualifier ====
First round
12	(Czech Republic) Klára Koukalová	6	6
(Estonia) Maret Ani	3	4
(Switzerland) Emmanuelle Gagliardi	7^{7}	3	2
13	(Ukraine) Julia Vakulenko	6^{5}	6	6

Qualifying competition
12	(Czech Republic) Klára Koukalová	2	6	6
13	(Ukraine) Julia Vakulenko	6	1	3
