= 2005 Italian Open – Women's singles =

Women's singles
- 2005 Italian Open

Final
- Champion: (France) Amélie Mauresmo
- Runner-up: (Switzerland) Patty Schnyder
- Score: 2–6, 6–3, 6–4

Details
- Draw: 56 (3WC/8Q/1LL)
- Seeds: 16

Events
Singles	men	women
Doubles	men	women
- Italian Open

Defending champion Amélie Mauresmo defeated Patty Schnyder in the final, 2–6, 6–3, 6–4 to win the women's singles tennis title at the 2005 Italian Open. This was Mauresmo’s 5th final in Rome in the last six years, with runner-up finishes in 2000, 2001, and 2003.

== Seeds ==
The first eight seeds received a bye into the second round.

1. (Russia) Maria Sharapova (semifinals)
2. (France) Amélie Mauresmo (champion)
3. (United States) Serena Williams (second round)
4. (Russia) Elena Dementieva (second round)
5. (Russia) Svetlana Kuznetsova (second round)
6. (Russia) Vera Zvonareva (semifinals)
7. (Russia) Nadia Petrova (third round, withdrew due to a right thigh strain)
8. (Switzerland) Patty Schnyder (final)
9. (Russia) Elena Bovina (quarterfinals)
10. (France) Nathalie Dechy (first round)
11. (Russia) Elena Likhovtseva (first round)
12. (France) Tatiana Golovin (first round)
13. (Italy) Silvia Farina Elia (third round)
14. (Japan) Shinobu Asagoe (first round)
15. (Japan) Ai Sugiyama (third round)
16. (Slovakia) Daniela Hantuchová (first round)

== Draw ==
Key

- Q = Qualifier
- WC = Wild card
- LL = Lucky loser
- Alt = Alternate
- ITF = ITF entry
- PR = Protected ranking
- SR = Special ranking
- SE = Special exempt
- JE = Junior exempt
- JR = Junior Accelerator Programme entrant
- CO = College Accelerator Programme entrant
- NG = Next Gen Accelerator Program entrant
- w/o = Walkover
- r = Retired
- d = Defaulted

=== Finals ===
Quarterfinals
1	(Russia) Maria Sharapova	6	6
9	(Russia) Elena Bovina	2	2
(Russia) Evgenia Linetskaya	1	0
8	(Switzerland) Patty Schnyder	6	6
6	(Russia) Vera Zvonareva	7	7^{7}
(Italy) Francesca Schiavone	5	6^{4}
(Spain) Conchita Martínez	1	2
2	(France) Amélie Mauresmo	6	6

Semifinals
1	(Russia) Maria Sharapova	6	3	1
8	(Switzerland) Patty Schnyder	3	6	6
6	(Russia) Vera Zvonareva	2	4
2	(France) Amélie Mauresmo	6	6

Final
8	(Switzerland) Patty Schnyder	6	3	4
2	(France) Amélie Mauresmo	2	6	6

=== Top half ===
==== Section 1 ====
First round
(Russia) A Jidkova	4	1
(Spain) A Medina Garrigues	6	6
(France) M Pierce	6	7
(China) S Peng	1	5
Q	(Croatia) S Mamić	6	6
16	(Slovakia) D Hantuchová	1	2
9	(Russia) E Bovina	6	6
(United States) M Washington	2	2
(Czech Republic) D Chládková	6^{4}	1
WC	(Italy) R Vinci	7^{7}	6
(Croatia) K Šprem	3	0
(Argentina) P Suárez	6	6

Second round
1	(Russia) M Sharapova	6	6
(Spain) A Medina Garrigues	4	2
(France) M Pierce	6	6
Q	(Croatia) S Mamić	4	4
9	(Russia) E Bovina	7	6
WC	(Italy) R Vinci	5	2
(Argentina) P Suárez	6	6
5	(Russia) S Kuznetsova	2	4

Third round
1	(Russia) M Sharapova	7^{7}	6
(France) M Pierce	6^{4}	4
9	(Russia) E Bovina	3	6	7^{7}
(Argentina) P Suárez	6	3	6^{5}

Quarterfinals
1	(Russia) M Sharapova	6	6
9	(Russia) E Bovina	2	2

==== Section 2 ====
First round
(Argentina) G Dulko	6	7
LL	(Spain) V Ruano Pascual	3	5
(Russia) E Linetskaya	6	6
(Italy) T Garbin	3	4
(Italy) F Pennetta	6	6
14	(Japan) S Asagoe	2	3
12	(France) T Golovin	3	4
(Serbia and Montenegro) A Ivanovic	6	6
Q	(Slovakia) L Kurhajcová	3	6	1
(Russia) A Chakvetadze	6	3	6
WC	(Italy) An Serra Zanetti	1	2
(Germany) A-L Grönefeld	6	6

Second round
4	(Russia) E Dementieva	5	4
(Argentina) G Dulko	7	6
(Russia) E Linetskaya	6	4	7^{7}
(Italy) F Pennetta	2	6	6^{5}
(Serbia and Montenegro) A Ivanovic	5	6	6
(Russia) A Chakvetadze	7	3	2
(Germany) A-L Grönefeld	2	4
8	(Switzerland) P Schnyder	6	6

Third round
(Argentina) G Dulko	7	4	4
(Russia) E Linetskaya	5	6	6
(Serbia and Montenegro) A Ivanovic	3	2
8	(Switzerland) P Schnyder	6	6

Quarterfinals
(Russia) E Linetskaya	1	0
8	(Switzerland) P Schnyder	6	6

=== Bottom half ===
==== Section 3 ====
First round
(Madagascar) D Randriantefy	7^{7}	2	1
(Serbia and Montenegro) J Janković	6^{3}	6	6
Q	(Ukraine) T Perebiynis	3	2
Q	(Colombia) C Castaño	6	6
(Italy) ME Camerin	4	6	6
10	(France) N Dechy	6	1	4
15	(Japan) A Sugiyama	6	6
(Bulgaria) M Maleeva	2	4
(Venezuela) M Vento-Kabchi	6	7^{7}
(France) V Razzano	4	6^{4}
(United States) M Shaughnessy	5	0
(Italy) F Schiavone	7	6

Second round
6	(Russia) V Zvonareva	6	6
(Serbia and Montenegro) J Janković	4	1
Q	(Colombia) C Castaño	6	6
(Italy) ME Camerin	2	2
15	(Japan) A Sugiyama	6	6
(Venezuela) M Vento-Kabchi	3	0
(Italy) F Schiavone	7^{7}	6
3	(United States) S Williams	6^{2}	1

Third round
6	(Russia) V Zvonareva	6	5	6
Q	(Colombia) C Castaño	1	7	2
15	(Japan) A Sugiyama	3	5
(Italy) F Schiavone	6	7

Quarterfinals
6	(Russia) V Zvonareva	7	7^{7}
(Italy) F Schiavone	5	6^{4}

==== Section 4 ====
First round
Q	(Italy) M Santangelo	6	6
(Colombia) F Zuluaga	2	2
(Spain) C Martínez	6	6
Q	(United States) A Haynes	0	1
(Israel) A Smashnova	6	6
11	(Russia) E Likhovtseva	1	3
13	(Italy) S Farina Elia	6	6
(Russia) M Kirilenko	4	1
Q	(France) S Cohen-Aloro	2	7^{7}	6
WC	(Italy) N Viérin	6	6^{4}	2
(Australia) S Stosur	6	6
Q	(Ukraine) Y Fedak	3	3

Second round
7	(Russia) N Petrova	6	6
Q	(Italy) M Santangelo	3	1
(Spain) C Martínez	3	6	6
(Israel) A Smashnova	6	1	1
13	(Italy) S Farina Elia	6	6
Q	(France) S Cohen-Aloro	3	3
(Australia) S Stosur	2	0
2	(France) A Mauresmo	6	6

Third round
7	(Russia) N Petrova
(Spain) C Martínez	w/o
13	(Italy) S Farina Elia	4	3
2	(France) A Mauresmo	6	6

Quarterfinals
(Spain) C Martínez	1	2
2	(France) A Mauresmo	6	6

== Qualifying ==
=== Qualifying seeds ===
1. (Spain) Virginia Ruano Pascual (qualifying competition, lucky loser)
2. (China) ~~Zheng Jie~~ (still playing at Rabat)
3. (United States) Abigail Spears (first round)
4. (Ukraine) Tatiana Perebiynis (qualified)
5. (Luxembourg) Claudine Schaul (first round)
6. (Ukraine) Yuliana Fedak (qualified)
7. (Spain) Marta Marrero (first round)
8. (France) Stéphanie Foretz (qualifying competition)
9. (Ukraine) Alona Bondarenko (qualifying competition)
10. (Russia) Tatiana Panova (first round)
11. (Switzerland) Emmanuelle Gagliardi (qualifying competition)
12. (Colombia) Catalina Castaño (qualified)
13. (France) Stéphanie Cohen-Aloro (qualified)
14. (United States) Angela Haynes (qualified)
15. (Croatia) Sanda Mamić (qualified)
16. (Tunisia) Selima Sfar (first round)

=== Qualifiers ===
1. (France) Stéphanie Cohen-Aloro
2. (Colombia) Catalina Castaño
3. (Slovakia) Ľubomíra Kurhajcová
4. (Ukraine) Tatiana Perebiynis
5. (United States) Angela Haynes
6. (Ukraine) Yuliana Fedak
7. (Italy) Mara Santangelo
8. (Croatia) Sanda Mamić

=== Lucky loser ===
1. (Spain) Virginia Ruano Pascual

=== Qualifying draw ===
==== First qualifier ====
First round
1	(Spain) Virginia Ruano Pascual	6	7
WC	(Italy) Giulia Casoni	2	5
(United States) Shikha Uberoi	1	4
13	(France) Stéphanie Cohen-Aloro	6	6

Qualifying competition
1	(Spain) Virginia Ruano Pascual	6	2	5
13	(France) Stéphanie Cohen-Aloro	3	6	7

==== Second qualifier ====
First round
Alt	(Belgium) Els Callens	4	1
Alt	(Hungary) Rita Kuti-Kis	6	6
WC	(Italy) Sara Errani	4	7	4
12	(Colombia) Catalina Castaño	6	5	6

Qualifying competition
Alt	(Hungary) Rita Kuti-Kis	3	2
12	(Colombia) Catalina Castaño	6	6

==== Third qualifier ====
First round
3	(United States) Abigail Spears	2	3
WC	(Italy) Adriana Serra Zanetti	6	6
(Slovakia) Ľubomíra Kurhajcová	7	6
10	(Russia) Tatiana Panova	5	0

Qualifying competition
WC	(Italy) Adriana Serra Zanetti	6^{5}	6	3
(Slovakia) Ľubomíra Kurhajcová	7^{7}	2	6

==== Fourth qualifier ====
First round
4	(Ukraine) Tatiana Perebiynis	6	2	6
(Croatia) Silvija Talaja	3	6	1
(Czech Republic) Kateřina Böhmová	4	3
11	(Switzerland) Emmanuelle Gagliardi	6	6

Qualifying competition
4	(Ukraine) Tatiana Perebiynis	4	6	6
11	(Switzerland) Emmanuelle Gagliardi	6	4	0

==== Fifth qualifier ====
First round
5	(Luxembourg) Claudine Schaul	2	3
WC	(Italy) Giulia Gabba	6	6
(China) Sun Tiantian	3	2
14	(United States) Angela Haynes	6	6

Qualifying competition
WC	(Italy) Giulia Gabba	6	4	0
14	(United States) Angela Haynes	4	6	6

==== Sixth qualifier ====
First round
6	(Ukraine) Yuliana Fedak	6	6
(Czech Republic) Sandra Kleinová	4	3
(United Kingdom) Elena Baltacha	1	2
9	(Ukraine) Alona Bondarenko	6	6

Qualifying competition
6	(Ukraine) Yuliana Fedak	6	6
9	(Ukraine) Alona Bondarenko	3	3

==== Seventh qualifier ====
First round
7	(Spain) Marta Marrero	6	6^{3}	1
(China) Li Ting	0	7^{7}	6
(Italy) Mara Santangelo	6	6
16	(Tunisia) Selima Sfar	1	0

Qualifying competition
(China) Li Ting	4	6	4
(Italy) Mara Santangelo	6	4	6

==== Eighth qualifier ====
First round
8	(France) Stéphanie Foretz	2	6	6
(Estonia) Maret Ani	6	3	3
SR	(Ukraine) Julia Vakulenko	1	4
15	(Croatia) Sanda Mamić	6	6

Qualifying competition
8	(France) Stéphanie Foretz	4	5
15	(Croatia) Sanda Mamić	6	7
