= 2005 Italian Open – Men's doubles =

Men's doubles
- 2005 Italian Open

Final
- Champions: (France) Michaël Llodra (France) Fabrice Santoro
- Runners-up: (United States) Bob Bryan (United States) Mike Bryan
- Score: 6–4, 6–2

Details
- Draw: 24
- Seeds: 8

Events
Singles	men	women
Doubles	men	women
← 2004 ·	Italian Open	· 2006 →

Mahesh Bhupathi and Max Mirnyi were the defending champions, but played this tournament with different partners. Bhupathi teamed up with Todd Woodbridge while Mirnyi teamed up with Jonas Björkman. Both pairs were eliminated in semifinals.

Michaël Llodra and Fabrice Santoro won the title, defeating Bob and Mike Bryan 6–4, 6–2 in the final.

== Seeds ==
All seeds received a bye into the second round.

1. (The Bahamas) Mark Knowles / (Canada) Daniel Nestor (quarterfinals)
2. (Sweden) Jonas Björkman / (Belarus) Max Mirnyi (semifinals)
3. (United States) Bob Bryan / (United States) Mike Bryan (final)
4. (Zimbabwe) Wayne Black / (Zimbabwe) Kevin Ullyett (second round)
5. (India) Mahesh Bhupathi / (Australia) Todd Woodbridge (semifinals)
6. (India) Leander Paes / (Serbia and Montenegro) Nenad Zimonjić (quarterfinals)
7. (Australia) Wayne Arthurs / (Australia) Paul Hanley (second round)
8. (France) Michaël Llodra / (France) Fabrice Santoro (champions)

== Draw ==
=== Key ===
- Q = Qualifier
- WC = Wild card
- LL = Lucky loser
- Alt = Alternate
- SE = Special exempt
- PR = Protected ranking
- ITF = ITF entry
- JE = Junior exempt
- w/o = Walkover
- r = Retired
- d = Defaulted
- SR = Special ranking

=== Finals ===
Semifinals
8	(France) Michaël Llodra (France) Fabrice Santoro	6	6
5	(India) Mahesh Bhupathi (Australia) Todd Woodbridge	4	4
3	(United States) Bob Bryan (United States) Mike Bryan	6	4	6
2	(Sweden) Jonas Björkman (Belarus) Max Mirnyi	3	6	2

Final
8	(France) Michaël Llodra (France) Fabrice Santoro	6	6
3	(United States) Bob Bryan (United States) Mike Bryan	4	2

=== Top half ===
First round
(Czech Republic) C Suk (Czech Republic) P Vízner	7	4	4
(Czech Republic) M Damm (Czech Republic) R Štěpánek	5	6	6
(Sweden) T Johansson (Croatia) I Ljubičić	2	7^{7}	4
(Argentina) G Etlis (Argentina) M Rodríguez	6	6^{2}	6
(Czech Republic) J Novák (Spain) T Robredo	6^{5}	7^{7}	6
(Chile) F González (Chile) N Massú	7^{7}	6^{2}	4
(Sweden) J Johansson (Russia) M Safin	6	6
(Czech Republic) F Čermák (Czech Republic) L Friedl	1	4

Second round
1	(The Bahamas) M Knowles (Canada) D Nestor	6	6
(Czech Republic) M Damm (Czech Republic) R Štěpánek	1	2
(Argentina) G Etlis (Argentina) M Rodríguez	2	3
8	(France) M Llodra (France) F Santoro	6	6
4	(Zimbabwe) W Black (Zimbabwe) K Ullyett	4	6	3
(Czech Republic) J Novák (Spain) T Robredo	6	3	6
(Sweden) J Johansson (Russia) M Safin
5	(India) M Bhupathi (Australia) T Woodbridge	w/o

Quarterfinals
1	(The Bahamas) M Knowles (Canada) D Nestor	7	3	2
8	(France) M Llodra (France) F Santoro	5	6	6
(Czech Republic) J Novák (Spain) T Robredo	3	2
5	(India) M Bhupathi (Australia) T Woodbridge	6	6

Semifinals
8	(France) M Llodra (France) F Santoro	6	6
5	(India) M Bhupathi (Australia) T Woodbridge	4	4

=== Bottom half ===
First round
WC	(Italy) D Bracciali (Italy) G Galimberti	6	6
(Austria) J Melzer (United States) A Roddick	2	0
(Israel) J Erlich (Israel) A Ram	7^{7}	4	2
(Sweden) S Aspelin (Australia) T Perry	6^{3}	6	6
(Spain) D Ferrer (Slovakia) D Hrbatý	6	7^{7}
(Argentina) M Hood (Austria) J Knowle	2	6^{3}
WC	(Italy) A Seppi (Italy) P Starace	6	6
(Argentina) L Arnold Ker (United States) J Palmer	4	3

Second round
6	(India) L Paes (Serbia and Montenegro) N Zimonjić	6	5	6
WC	(Italy) D Bracciali (Italy) G Galimberti	4	7	1
(Sweden) S Aspelin (Australia) T Perry	2	3
3	(United States) B Bryan (United States) M Bryan	6	6
7	(Australia) W Arthurs (Australia) P Hanley	5	4
(Spain) D Ferrer (Slovakia) D Hrbatý	7	6
WC	(Italy) A Seppi (Italy) P Starace	0	1
2	(Sweden) J Björkman (Belarus) M Mirnyi	6	6

Quarterfinals
6	(India) L Paes (Serbia and Montenegro) N Zimonjić	2	6	5
3	(United States) B Bryan (United States) M Bryan	6	4	7
(Spain) D Ferrer (Slovakia) D Hrbatý	2	1
2	(Sweden) J Björkman (Belarus) M Mirnyi	6	6

Semifinals
3	(United States) B Bryan (United States) M Bryan	6	4	6
2	(Sweden) J Björkman (Belarus) M Mirnyi	3	6	2
