= 2005 Italian Open (tennis) =

- Date: 2–9 May (men); 9–15 May (women)
- Edition: 62nd
- Surface: Clay / outdoor
- Location: Rome, Italy
- Venue: Foro Italico

Champions

Men's singles
- (Spain) Rafael Nadal

Women's singles
- (France) Amélie Mauresmo

Men's doubles
- (France) Michaël Llodra / (France) Fabrice Santoro

Women's doubles
- (Zimbabwe) Cara Black / (South Africa) Liezel Huber
- Italian Open

The 2005 Italian Open (also known as the 2005 Rome Masters and the 2005 Telecom Italia Masters for sponsorship reason) was a tennis tournament played on outdoor clay courts. It was the 62nd edition of the Italian Open, and was part of the ATP Masters Series of the 2005 ATP Tour, and of the Tier I Series of the 2005 WTA Tour. Both the men's and the women's events took place at the Foro Italico in Rome, Italy.

== Finals ==
=== Men's singles ===
(Spain) Rafael Nadal defeated (Argentina) Guillermo Coria, 6–4, 3–6, 6–3, 4–6, 7–6^{(8–6)}

- It was Nadal's 5th title of the year, and his 6th overall. It was his 2nd Masters title of the year, and his 2nd overall.

=== Women's singles ===
(France) Amélie Mauresmo defeated (Switzerland) Patty Schnyder, 2–6, 6–3, 6–4

- It was Mauresmo's 2nd title of the year, and her 17th overall. It was her 1st Tier I title of the year and her 6th overall.

=== Men's doubles ===
(France) Michaël Llodra / (France) Fabrice Santoro defeated (United States) Bob Bryan / (United States) Mike Bryan, 6–4, 6–2

=== Women's doubles ===
(Zimbabwe) Cara Black / (South Africa) Liezel Huber defeated (Russia) Maria Kirilenko / (Spain) Anabel Medina Garrigues, 6–0, 4–6, 6–1
