= Anabel Medina Garrigues =

Spanish tennis player and coach

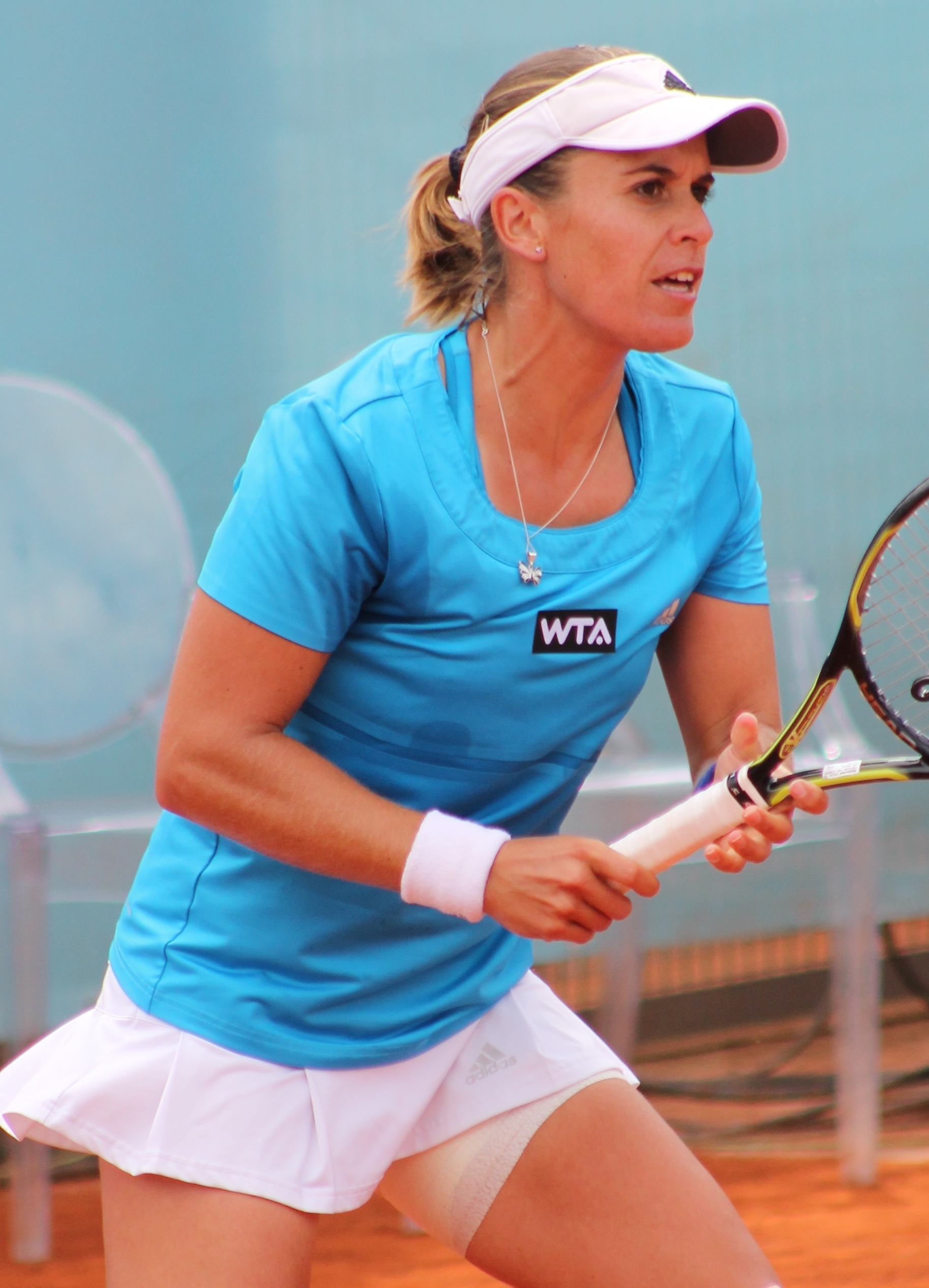
- Medina Garrigues at the 2014 Madrid Open
- Full name: Ana Isabel Medina Garrigues
- Country (sports): Spain
- Born: 31 July 1982 (age 43) Valencia
- Height: 1.69 m (5 ft 7 in)
- Turned pro: January 1998
- Retired: August 2018
- Plays: Right-handed (two-handed backhand)
- Prize money: US$5,956,607

Singles
- Career record: 478–351
- Career titles: 11
- Highest ranking: No. 16 (4 May 2009)

Grand Slam singles results
- Australian Open: 4R (2002, 2009)
- French Open: 4R (2007)
- Wimbledon: 3R (2006, 2008, 2009)
- US Open: 3R (2005, 2007, 2011)

Doubles
- Career record: 447–295
- Career titles: 28
- Highest ranking: No. 3 (10 November 2008)

Grand Slam doubles results
- Australian Open: SF (2008)
- French Open: W (2008, 2009)
- Wimbledon: SF (2009)
- US Open: SF (2008, 2012)

Other doubles tournaments
- Olympic Games: Silver medal (2008)

Grand Slam mixed doubles results
- Australian Open: SF (2009)
- French Open: 2R (2011)
- Wimbledon: SF (2015)
- US Open: SF (2013)

Team competitions
- Fed Cup: 18–16

Coaching career (2017-)
- Jeļena Ostapenko (2017)

Coaching achievements
- Coachee singles titles total: 2
- List of notable tournaments (with champion) French Open (Ostapenko)

Ana Isabel Medina Garrigues (Spanish: [anaˈβel meˈðina ɣaˈriɣes], (Note: In isolation, Garrigues is pronounced [ɡaˈriɣes].) Valencian: [anaˈbɛl meˈðina ɣaˈriɣes]; born 31 July 1982) is a Spanish tennis coach and former professional player.

As a player, she reached a career-high ranking of world No. 16 in 2009, and won 11 singles and 28 doubles titles, including the 2008 and 2009 French Open with Virginia Ruano Pascual. Like many of her Spanish compatriots, she was a clay-court specialist who ground out most of her rallies. However, unlike most of her fellow Spaniards, she preferred to play on hard courts. She won the WTA Tour tournament in Strasbourg, beating Katarina Srebotnik in the final in May 2008, thus defending the title she won the previous year against Amélie Mauresmo. Her other singles titles came at Palermo in 2011, 2006, 2005, 2004 and 2001, at Canberra in 2006, Strasbourg in 2005 and Fès in 2009.

After retirement from singles tennis (she continues playing doubles) at the end of the 2014 season, Medina Garrigues became a professional coach, gaining success while working for Jeļena Ostapenko, who won the 2017 French Open Grand Slam title. In late 2017, she was named captain of Spain's Fed Cup team. She has also become a tournament organizer at the Valencia Open.

== Career ==
=== 2008–2009 ===
Together with Virginia Ruano Pascual, she won the French Open and the silver medal at the 2008 Beijing Olympics. They successfully defended their French Open title in 2009.

=== 2011 ===
Medina Garrigues began 2011 by losing in the first rounds of Auckland Open, Australian Open, and Copa Colsanitas and in the qualifying draw of the Sydney International. She then reached her first semifinal in nine months in the Abierto Mexicano with wins over top seed Julia Görges and seventh seed Carla Suárez Navarro before losing to Gisela Dulko in straight sets. At the Indian Wells Open, she defeated Tamira Paszek before losing to Maria Sharapova.

Garrigues then qualified for the Tournament of Champions and reached the final, but she was defeated by defending champion Ana Ivanovic in two sets.

=== 2012 ===
Medina Garrigues reached the quarterfinals of the Swedish Open in Båstad, where she lost to Johanna Larsson.

=== 2014 ===
Medina Garrigues started 2014 at the Australian Open and lost in the first round to lucky loser Irina Falconi.

At the Pattaya Open, Medina Garrigues was defeated in the first round by Alison Riske without winning a single game. She announced that the French Open would be her last tournament, before retiring from singles tennis, though she would continue to play doubles. Medina Garrigues lost in the second round of qualifying there to Tereza Smitková in two sets, ending her singles career.

=== 2018 ===
Medina Garrigues entered the doubles competition at the Madrid Open, partnering fellow Spaniard Arantxa Parra Santonja. Then in August, she retired from the tennis circuit.

== Performance timelines ==
Key
| W | F | SF | QF | #R | RR | Q# | P# | DNQ | A | Z# | PO | G | S | B | NMS | NTI | P | NH |

(W) winner; (F) finalist; (SF) semifinalist; (QF) quarterfinalist; (#R) rounds 4, 3, 2, 1; (RR) round-robin stage; (Q#) qualification round; (P#) preliminary round; (DNQ) did not qualify; (A) absent; (Z#) Davis/Fed Cup Zonal Group (with number indication) or (PO) play-off; (G) gold, (S) silver or (B) bronze Olympic/Paralympic medal; (NMS) not a Masters tournament; (NTI) not a Tier I tournament; (P) postponed; (NH) not held; (SR) strike rate (events won / competed); (W–L) win–loss record.

=== Singles ===
| Tournament | 2001 | 2002 | 2003 | 2004 | 2005 | 2006 | 2007 | 2008 | 2009 | 2010 | 2011 | 2012 | 2013 | 2014 | SR | W–L |
|---|---|---|---|---|---|---|---|---|---|---|---|---|---|---|---|---|
Grand Slam tournaments
| Australian Open | 2R | 4R | 1R | 3R | 1R | 1R | 1R | 2R | 4R | 1R | 1R | 3R | 1R | 1R | | 12–14 |
| French Open | 1R | A | A | 2R | 3R | 3R | 4R | 3R | 2R | 2R | 2R | 3R | 1R | Q2 | | 15–11 |
| Wimbledon | 1R | A | A | 1R | 1R | 3R | 1R | 3R | 3R | 1R | 1R | 2R | 1R | A | | 7–11 |
| US Open | 1R | A | A | 2R | 3R | 1R | 3R | 2R | 2R | 1R | 3R | 1R | 1R | A | | 9–10 |
| Win–loss | 1–4 | 3–1 | 0–1 | 4–4 | 4–4 | 4–4 | 5–4 | 6–4 | 7–4 | 1–4 | 3–4 | 5–4 | 0–4 | 0–1 | | 43–46 |
Olympic Games
| Summer Olympics | not held | | | 1R | not held | | | 1R | not held | | | 1R | NH | | | 0–3 |
Year-end championships
| WTA Tour Championships | absent | | | | | | | | | | | | | | | 0–0 |
| Tournament of Champions | not held | | | | | | | | RR | A | F | A | A | A | | 2–3 |
Premier Mandatory & 5
| Dubai / Qatar Open (Note: The first Premier 5 event of the year has switched back and forth between the Dubai Tennis Championships and the Qatar Ladies Open since 2009. Dubai was classified as a Premier 5 event from 2009 to 2011 before being succeeded by Doha for the 2012–2014 period. In 2015, Dubai regained its Premier 5 status while Doha was demoted to Premier status. The Premier 5 tournaments were reclassified as WTA 1000 tournaments in 2021.) | not held | | | | not Tier 1 | | | | 3R | 2R | A | no Premier 5 | | | | 3–2 |
| Indian Wells Open | absent | | | 2R | 3R | 2R | 1R | 4R | 1R | 2R | 2R | 3R | 3R | A | | 11–10 |
| Miami Open | Absent | | | 2R | 2R | 2R | 2R | 2R | 4R | 2R | 4R | 2R | 1R | A | | 12–10 |
| Madrid Open | not held | | | | | | | | 1R | 3R | 1R | 3R | QF | 1R | | 7–6 |
| Italian Open | A | | 1R | A | 2R | 3R | QF | 2R | 1R | A | 3R | 3R | 1R | A | | 11–9 |
| Canadian Open | Absent | | | | 2R | 2R | 1R | A | 1R | 1R | 2R | A | A | A | | 3–6 |
| Cincinnati Open | not held | | | | | not Tier 1 | | | A | 1R | 1R | 2R | A | A | | 1–3 |
| Pan Pacific / Wuhan Open (Note: In 2014, the Pan Pacific Open was downgraded to a Premier event and replaced by the Wuhan Open. The Premier 5 tournaments were reclassified as WTA 1000 tournaments in 2021.) | absent | | | | | | | | 1R | 1R | A | 1R | A | A | | 0–3 |
| China Open | not held | | | | not Tier 1 | | | | 2R | 1R | 1R | 1R | A | A | | 1–3 |
Career statistics
| Overall win–loss | 28–24 | 11–6 | 39–22 | 37–27 | 30–25 | 37–25 | 28–25 | 45–27 | 33–28 | 22–26 | 35–18 | 23–26 | 19–26 | 3–9 | | 477–351 |
| Year-end ranking | 66 | 116 | 71 | 39 | 34 | 27 | 35 | 22 | 28 | 73 | 27 | 50 | 100 | 464 | | - |

=== Doubles ===
| Tournament | 2000 | 2001 | 2002 | 2003 | 2004 | 2005 | 2006 | 2007 | 2008 | 2009 | 2010 | 2011 | 2012 | 2013 | 2014 | 2015 | 2016 | 2017 | 2018 | SR | W–L |
|---|---|---|---|---|---|---|---|---|---|---|---|---|---|---|---|---|---|---|---|---|---|
Grand Slam tournaments
| Australian Open | A | A | 2R | 1R | 1R | QF | 1R | 3R | SF | 3R | 1R | 2R | 1R | 1R | 2R | 2R | 3R | A | A | 0 / 15 | 17–15 |
| French Open | A | 1R | A | A | 1R | 2R | SF | QF | W | W | SF | 3R | 3R | 1R | 1R | 3R | 1R | A | 2R | 2 / 15 | 31–13 |
| Wimbledon | A | 1R | A | A | 1R | 3R | QF | 3R | 3R | SF | 1R | 2R | 1R | 1R | 3R | 3R | 3R | A | A | 0 / 14 | 20–14 |
| US Open | A | 1R | A | A | 2R | 1R | A | 3R | SF | 3R | 2R | 3R | SF | 3R | 2R | 2R | A | A | 1R | 0 / 13 | 20–13 |
| Win–loss | 0–0 | 0–3 | 1–1 | 0–1 | 1–4 | 6–4 | 7–3 | 9–4 | 16–3 | 14–3 | 5–4 | 6–4 | 6–4 | 2–4 | 4–4 | 6–4 | 4–3 | 0–0 | 1–2 | 2 / 57 | 88–55 |
Olympic Games
| Summer Olympics | A | not held | | | 1R | not held | | | S | not held | | | 1R | not held | | | 1R | not held | | 0 / 4 | 4–4 |
Year-end championships
| Tour Championships | A | A | A | A | A | A | A | A | SF | A | A | A | A | A | A | A | A | A | A | 0 / 1 | 0–1 |
Premier M & Premier 5
| Dubai / Qatar Open | | | | | | | | | 1R | SF | 1R | A | QF | 1R | | A | NP5 | A | NP5 | 0 / 5 | 2–5 |
| Indian Wells Open | A | A | A | A | A | 2R | SF | QF | 1R | 1R | 1R | 1R | 1R | QF | 2R | 1R | 1R | A | A | 0 / 12 | 8–12 |
| Miami Open | A | A | A | A | A | 2R | QF | 1R | 1R | QF | A | SF | QF | 2R | QF | 1R | 2R | A | A | 0 / 11 | 14–11 |
| Madrid Open | not held | | | | | | | | | 2R | 2R | 2R | 2R | 1R | SF | 1R | 2R | A | 1R | 0 / 9 | 6–9 |
| Italian Open | A | A | A | 1R | A | F | SF | 1R | QF | A | A | QF | 2R | 1R | SF | 1R | 2R | A | 2R | 0 / 12 | 16–12 |
| Canadian Open | A | A | A | A | A | QF | A | 1R | A | 2R | SF | 1R | A | A | 1R | 2R | A | A | A | 0 / 7 | 6–7 |
| Cincinnati Open | not held | | | | Tier III | | | | | A | 2R | 1R | 1R | 1R | QF | QF | 2R | A | A | 0 / 7 | 5–7 |
| Pan Pacific / Wuhan Open | A | A | A | A | A | A | A | A | A | QF | 1R | A | QF | A | QF | 2R | A | A | A | 0 / 5 | 4–5 |
| China Open | Tier IV | | | Tier II | | | | | | 2R | 1R | QF | 2R | 2R | 1R | 1R | A | A | A | 0 / 7 | 5–7 |
Career statistics
| Titles | 0 | 4 | 0 | 0 | 1 | 2 | 0 | 1 | 4 | 1 | 3 | 2 | 0 | 3 | 2 | 2 | 3 | 0 | 0 | 28 | |
| Finals | 0 | 5 | 0 | 0 | 2 | 6 | 1 | 3 | 6 | 2 | 4 | 2 | 1 | 4 | 2 | 5 | 3 | 0 | 0 | 46 | |
| Year-end ranking | 259 | 42 | 177 | 165 | 79 | 20 | 19 | 25 | 3 | 11 | 25 | 30 | 24 | 30 | 23 | 32 | 36 | | | | |

== Grand Slam tournaments ==
=== Doubles: 2 (2 titles) ===
| Result | Date | Championship | Surface | Partner | Opponents | Score |
|---|---|---|---|---|---|---|
| Win | 2008 | French Open | Clay | (Spain) Virginia Ruano Pascual | (Australia) Casey Dellacqua (Italy) Francesca Schiavone | 2–6, 7–5, 6–4 |
| Win | 2009 | French Open (2) | Clay | (Spain) Virginia Ruano Pascual | (Belarus) Victoria Azarenka (Russia) Elena Vesnina | 6–1, 6–1 |

== Other significant finals ==
=== Olympic Games ===
==== Doubles: 1 (silver medal) ====
| Result | Year | Tournament | Surface | Partner | Opponents | Score |
|---|---|---|---|---|---|---|
| Silver | 2008 | Beijing Olympics | Hard | (Spain) Virginia Ruano Pascual | (United States) Serena Williams (United States) Venus Williams | 2–6, 0–6 |

=== WTA Elite Trophy ===
==== Singles: 1 (runner-up) ====
| Result | Year | Tournament | Surface | Opponent | Score |
|---|---|---|---|---|---|
| Loss | 2011 | WTA Elite Trophy, Indonesia | Hard | (Serbia) Ana Ivanovic | 3–6, 0–6 |

=== Premier Mandatory tournaments ===
==== Doubles: 1 (runner-up) ====
| Result | Year | Tournament | Surface | Partner | Opponents | Score |
|---|---|---|---|---|---|---|
| Loss | 2005 | Italian Open | Clay | (Russia) Maria Kirilenko | (Zimbabwe) Cara Black (South Africa) Liezel Huber | 0–6, 6–4, 1–6 |

== WTA Tour finals ==
=== Singles: 18 (11 titles, 7 runner-ups) ===
| Legend WTA Elite Trophy (0–1) Premier (0–0) International (11–6) | Finals by surface Hard (1–5) Clay (10–2) Grass (0–0) |

| Result | W–L | Date | Tournament | Tier | Surface | Opponent | Score |
|---|---|---|---|---|---|---|---|
| Win | 1–0 | Jul 2001 | Palermo Ladies Open, Italy | Tier V | Clay | (Spain) Cristina Torrens Valero | 6–4, 6–4 |
| Loss | 1–1 | Jan 2002 | Hobart International, Australia | Tier V | Hard | (Slovakia) Martina Suchá | 6–7^{(7–9)}, 1–6 |
| Loss | 1–2 | Feb 2003 | Copa Colsanitas, Colombia | Tier III | Clay | (Colombia) Fabiola Zuluaga | 3–6, 2–6 |
| Win | 2–2 | Jul 2004 | Palermo Ladies Open (2) | Tier V | Clay | (Italy) Flavia Pennetta | 6–4, 6–4 |
| Win | 3–2 | May 2005 | Internationaux de Strasbourg, France | Tier III | Clay | (Poland) Marta Domachowska | 6–4, 6–3 |
| Win | 4–2 | Jul 2005 | Palermo Ladies Open (3) | Tier IV | Clay | (Czech Republic) Klára Koukalová | 6–4, 6–0 |
| Win | 5–2 | Jan 2006 | Canberra International, Australia | Tier IV | Hard | (South Korea) Cho Yoon-jeong | 6–4, 0–6, 6–4 |
| Win | 6–2 | Jul 2006 | Palermo Ladies Open (4) | Tier III | Clay | (Italy) Tathiana Garbin | 6–4, 6–4 |
| Loss | 6–3 | Oct 2006 | Guangzhou Open, China | Tier III | Hard | (Russia) Anna Chakvetadze | 1–6, 4–6 |
| Win | 7–3 | May 2007 | Internationaux de Strasbourg (2) | Tier III | Clay | (France) Amélie Mauresmo | 6–4, 4–6, 6–4 |
| Loss | 7–4 | May 2008 | Morocco Open | Tier IV | Clay | (Argentina) Gisela Dulko | 6–7^{(2–7)}, 6–7^{(5–7)} |
| Win | 8–4 | May 2008 | Internationaux de Strasbourg (3) | Tier III | Clay | (Slovenia) Katarina Srebotnik | 4–6, 7–6^{(7–4)}, 6–0 |
| Loss | 8–5 | Jul 2008 | Slovenia Open | Tier IV | Hard | (Italy) Sara Errani | 3–6, 3–6 |
| Win | 9–5 | May 2009 | Morocco Open | International | Clay | (Russia) Ekaterina Makarova | 6–0, 6–1 |
| Loss | 9–6 | Sep 2009 | Korea Open | International | Hard | (Japan) Kimiko Date-Krumm | 3–6, 3–6 |
| Win | 10–6 | Apr 2011 | Estoril Open, Portugal | International | Clay | (Germany) Kristina Barrois | 6–1, 6–2 |
| Win | 11–6 | Jul 2011 | Palermo Ladies Open (5) | International | Clay | (Slovenia) Polona Hercog | 6–3, 6–2 |
| Loss | 11–7 | Nov 2011 | Tournament of Champions, Bali | Elite | Hard (i) | (Serbia) Ana Ivanovic | 3–6, 0–6 |

=== Doubles: 45 (28 titles, 17 runner-ups) ===
| Legend Grand Slam tournaments (2–0) WTA Elite Trophy (0–1) Premier M & Premier 5 (0–1) Premier (3–7) WTA International (23–8) | Finals by surface Hard (10–9) Clay (16–7) Grass (2–0) Carpet (0–1) |

| Result | W–L | Date | Tournament | Tier | Surface | Partner | Opponents | Score |
|---|---|---|---|---|---|---|---|---|
| Win | 1. | Mar 2001 | Mexican Open | Tier III | Clay | (Spain) María José Martínez Sánchez | (Spain) Virginia Ruano Pascual (Argentina) Paola Suárez | 6–4, 6–7^{(5–7)}, 7–5 |
| Win | 2. | Apr 2001 | Porto Open, Portugal | Tier IV | Clay | (Spain) María José Martínez Sánchez | (France) Alexandra Fusai (Italy) Rita Grande | 6–1, 6–7^{(5–7)}, 7–5 |
| Win | 3. | May 2001 | Bol Ladies Open, Croatia | Tier III | Clay | (Spain) María José Martínez Sánchez | (Russia) Nadia Petrova (Slovenia) Tina Pisnik | 7–5, 6–4 |
| Loss | 1. | Jul 2001 | Palermo Ladies Open, Italy | Tier V | Clay | (Spain) María José Martínez Sánchez | (Italy) Tathiana Garbin (Slovakia) Janette Husárová | 6–4, 2–6, 4–6 |
| Win | 4. | Aug 2001 | Swiss Indoors | Tier IV | Clay | (Spain) María José Martínez Sánchez | (South Africa) Joannette Kruger (Spain) Marta Marrero | 7–6^{(7–5)}, 6–2 |
| Loss | 2. | Feb 2004 | Copa Colsanitas, Colombia | Tier III | Clay | (Spain) Arantxa Parra Santonja | (Germany) Jasmin Wöhr (Austria) Barbara Schwartz | 1–6, 3–6 |
| Win | 5. | Jul 2004 | Palermo Ladies Open (2) | Tier V | Clay | (Spain) Arantxa Sánchez Vicario | (Slovakia) Ľubomíra Kurhajcová (Slovakia) Henrieta Nagyová | 6–3, 7–6 |
| Loss | 3. | Jan 2005 | Hobart International, Australia | Tier V | Hard | (Russia) Dinara Safina | (China) Yan Zi (China) Zheng Jie | 4–6, 5–7 |
| Loss | 4. | Feb 2005 | Paris Indoors, France | Tier II | Carpet (i) | (Russia) Dinara Safina | (Czech Republic) Iveta Benešová (Czech Republic) Květa Peschke | 2–6, 6–2, 2–6 |
| Loss | 5. | Feb 2005 | Diamond Games Antwerp, Belgium | Tier II | Hard | (Russia) Dinara Safina | (Zimbabwe) Cara Black (Belgium) Els Callens | 6–3, 4–6, 4–6 |
| Loss | 6. | May 2005 | Italian Open | Tier I | Hard | (Russia) Maria Kirilenko | (Zimbabwe) Cara Black (South Africa) Liezel Huber | 0–6, 6–4, 1–6 |
| Win | 6. | Jun 2005 | Rosmalen Open, Netherlands | Tier III | Grass | (Russia) Dinara Safina | (Czech Republic) Iveta Benešová (Spain) Nuria Llagostera Vives | 6–4, 2–6, 7–6^{(13–11)} |
| Win | 7. | Sep 2005 | Slovenia Open | Tier IV | Hard | (Italy) Roberta Vinci | (Croatia) Jelena Kostanić (Slovenia) Katarina Srebotnik | 6–4, 5–7, 6–2 |
| Loss | 7. | May 2006 | Warsaw Open, Poland | Tier II | Clay | (Slovenia) Katarina Srebotnik | (Russia) Elena Likhovtseva (Russia) Anastasia Myskina | 3–6, 4–6 |
| Loss | 8. | Jan 2007 | Hobart International (2) | Tier IV | Hard | (Spain) Virginia Ruano Pascual | (Russia) Elena Likhovtseva (Russia) Elena Vesnina | 4–6, 5–7 |
| Loss | 9. | Apr 2007 | Amelia Island Championships, US | Tier II | Clay | (Spain) Virginia Ruano Pascual | (Italy) Mara Santangelo (Slovenia) Katarina Srebotnik | 3–6, 6–7^{(4–7)} |
| Win | 8. | Jul 2007 | Stockholm Open, Sweden | Tier IV | Hard | (Spain) Virginia Ruano Pascual | (Chinese Taipei) Chan Chin-wei (Ukraine) Tetiana Luzhanska | 6–1, 5–7, [10–6] |
| Win | 9. | Jan 2008 | Hobart International (3) | Tier IV | Hard | (Spain) Virginia Ruano Pascual | (Greece) Eleni Daniilidou (Germany) Jasmin Wöhr | 6–2, 6–4 |
| Win | 10. | Jun 2008 | French Open | Grand Slam | Clay | (Spain) Virginia Ruano Pascual | (Australia) Casey Dellacqua (Italy) Francesca Schiavone | 2–6, 7–5, 6–4 |
| Loss | 10. | Jun 2008 | Rosmalen Open, Netherlands | Tier III | Clay | (Spain) Virginia Ruano Pascual | (Chinese Taipei) Chan Yung-jan (Chinese Taipei) Chuang Chia-jung | 5–7, 2–6 |
| Win | 11. | Jul 2008 | Slovenia Open | Tier IV | Hard | (Spain) Virginia Ruano Pascual | (Russia) Vera Dushevina (Russia) Ekaterina Makarova | 6–4, 6–1 |
| Win | 12. | Sep 2008 | China Open | Tier II | Hard | (Denmark) Caroline Wozniacki | (China) Han Xinyun (China) Xu Yifan | 6–1, 6–3 |
| Loss | 11. | Apr 2009 | Andalucia Tennis Experience, Spain | International | Clay | (Spain) Virginia Ruano Pascual | (Poland) Klaudia Jans (Poland) Alicja Rosolska | 3–6, 3–6 |
| Win | 13. | Jun 2009 | French Open | Grand Slam | Clay | (Spain) Virginia Ruano Pascual | (Belarus) Victoria Azarenka (Russia) Elena Vesnina | 6–1, 6–1 |
| Win | 14. | May 2010 | Morocco Open | International | Clay | (Czech Republic) Iveta Benešová | (Czech Republic) Lucie Hradecká (Czech Republic) Renata Voráčová | 6–3, 6–1 |
| Win | 15. | May 2010 | Portugal Open | International | Clay | (Romania) Sorana Cîrstea | (Russia) Vitalia Diatchenko (France) Aurélie Védy | 6–1, 7–5 |
| Loss | 12. | Jul 2010 | Budapest Grand Prix, Hungary | International | Clay | (Romania) Sorana Cîrstea | (Switzerland) Timea Bacsinszky (Italy) Tathiana Garbin | 3–6, 3–6 |
| Win | 16. | Jul 2010 | Gastein Ladies, Austria | International | Clay | (Czech Republic) Lucie Hradecká | (Switzerland) Timea Bacsinszky (Italy) Tathiana Garbin | 6–7^{(2–7)}, 6–1, [10–5] |
| Win | 17. | Feb 2011 | Copa Colsanitas, Colombia | International | Clay | (Romania) Edina Gallovits-Hall | (Canada) Sharon Fichman (Spain) Laura Pous Tió | 2–6, 7–6^{(8–6)}, [11–9] |
| Win | 18. | Jul 2011 | Budapest Grand Prix (2) | International | Clay | (Poland) Alicja Rosolska | (South Africa) Natalie Grandin (Czech Republic) Vladimíra Uhlířová | 6–2, 6–2 |
| Loss | 13. | Apr 2012 | Charleston Cup, US | Premier | Hard | (Kazakhstan) Yaroslava Shvedova | (Russia) Anastasia Pavlyuchenkova (Czech Republic) Lucie Šafářová | 7–5, 4–6, [6–10] |
| Win | 19. | Mar 2013 | Brasil Tennis Cup | International | Hard | (Kazakhstan) Yaroslava Shvedova | (United Kingdom) Anne Keothavong (Russia) Valeria Savinykh | 6–0, 6–4 |
| Win | 20. | Jun 2013 | Rosmalen Open, Netherlands (2) | International | Grass | (Romania) Irina-Camelia Begu | (Slovakia) Dominika Cibulková (Spain) Arantxa Parra Santonja | 4–6, 7–6^{(7–3)}, [11–9] |
| Win | 21. | Jul 2013 | Swedish Open | International | Clay | (Czech Republic) Klára Zakopalová | (Romania) Alexandra Dulgheru (Italy) Flavia Pennetta | 6–1, 6–4 |
| Loss | 14. | Aug 2013 | New Haven Open, US | Premier | Hard | (Slovenia) Katarina Srebotnik | (India) Sania Mirza (China) Zheng Jie | 3–6, 4–6 |
| Win | 22. | Feb 2014 | Brasil Tennis Cup (2) | International | Hard | (Kazakhstan) Yaroslava Shvedova | (Italy) Francesca Schiavone (Spain) Sílvia Soler Espinosa | 7–6^{(7–1)}, 2–6, [10–3] |
| Win | 23. | Apr 2014 | Charleston Cup, US | Premier | Clay (green) | (Kazakhstan) Yaroslava Shvedova | (Chinese Taipei) Chan Hao-ching (Chinese Taipei) Chan Yung-jan | 7–6^{(7–4)}, 6–2 |
| Win | 24. | Feb 2015 | Antwerp Open, Belgium (2) | Premier | Hard (i) | (Spain) Arantxa Parra Santonja | (Belgium) An-Sophie Mestach (Belgium) Alison Van Uytvanck | 6–4, 3–6, [10–5] |
| Win | 25. | May 2015 | Nuremberg Cup, Germany | International | Clay | (Chinese Taipei) Chan Hao-ching | (Spain) Lara Arruabarrena (Romania) Raluca Olaru | 6–4, 7–6^{(7–5)} |
| Loss | 15. | Aug 2015 | Stanford Classic, US | Premier | Hard | (Spain) Arantxa Parra Santonja | (China) Xu Yifan (China) Zheng Saisai | 1–6, 3–6 |
| Loss | 16. | Oct 2015 | Luxembourg Open | International | Hard (i) | (Spain) Arantxa Parra Santonja | (Germany) Mona Barthel (Germany) Laura Siegemund | 2–6, 6–7^{(2–7)} |
| Loss | 17. | Nov 2015 | WTA Elite Trophy, Zhuhai | Elite | Hard (i) | (Spain) Arantxa Parra Santonja | (China) Liang Chen (China) Wang Yafan | 4–6, 3–6 |
| Win | 26. | Feb 2016 | Mexican Open (2) | International | Hard | (Spain) Arantxa Parra Santonja | (Netherlands) Kiki Bertens (Sweden) Johanna Larsson | 6–0, 6–4 |
| Win | 27. | Mar 2016 | Monterrey Open, US | International | Hard | (Spain) Arantxa Parra Santonja | (Croatia) Petra Martić (United States) Maria Sanchez | 4–6, 7–5, [10–7] |
| Win | 28. | May 2016 | Internationaux de Strasbourg, France | International | Clay | (Spain) Arantxa Parra Santonja | (Argentina) María Irigoyen (China) Liang Chen | 6–2, 6–0 |

== ITF finals ==
Legend
$100,000 tournaments
$75,000 tournaments
$50,000 tournaments
$25,000 tournaments
$10,000 tournaments

=== Singles (6–4) ===
| Result | No. | Date | Tournament | Tier | Surface | Opponent | Score |
|---|---|---|---|---|---|---|---|
| Win | 1. | 29 March 1999 | ITF Pontevedra, Spain | 10,000 | Hard | (Spain) Ángeles Montolio | 6–1, 6–2 |
| Loss | 1. | 23 April 2000 | ITF Gelos, France | 25,000 | Clay | (Spain) Marta Marrero | 6–2, 5–7, 5–7 |
| Loss | 2. | 12 July 2000 | Open de Marseille, France | 50,000 | Clay | (Spain) Ángeles Montolio | 2–6, 7–6, 4–6 |
| Win | 2. | 4 September 2000 | Open Denain, France | 50,000 | Hard (i) | (Spain) María José Martínez Sánchez | 2–6, 7–5, 6–0 |
| Win | 3. | 7 October 2001 | ITF Girona, Spain | 50,000 | Clay | (Germany) Angelika Rösch | 6–4, 6–4 |
| Win | 4. | 29 June 2003 | ITF Périgueux, France | 25,000 | Clay | (France) Céline Beigbeder | 6–1, 6–2 |
| Win | 5. | 8 September 2003 | Open Denain, France | 75,000 | Clay | (Spain) Gala León García | 6–4, 6–0 |
| Loss | 3. | 21 September 2003 | ITF Bordeaux, France | 75,000 | Clay | (Czech Republic) Zuzana Ondrášková | 7–6^{(4)}, 4–6, 3–6 |
| Win | 6. | 13 June 2004 | Open de Marseille, France | 50,000 | Clay | (Slovakia) Ľubomíra Kurhajcová | 5–7, 6–3, 6–3 |
| Loss | 4. | 9 June 2013 | Open de Marseille, France | 100,000 | Clay | (Germany) Andrea Petkovic | 4–6, 2–6 |

=== Doubles (3–3) ===
| Result | No. | Date | Tournament | Tier | Surface | Partner | Opponents | Score |
|---|---|---|---|---|---|---|---|---|
| Loss | 1. | 11 May 1998 | ITF Tortosa, Spain | 10,000 | Clay | (Spain) María José Martínez Sánchez | (Spain) Patricia Aznar (Spain) Cynthia Perez | 0–6, 3–6 |
| Win | 1. | 5 July 1999 | ITF Vigo, Spain | 10,000 | Clay | (Spain) Lourdes Domínguez Lino | (Spain) Patricia Aznar (Spain) Ana Salas Lozano | 7–5, 6–1 |
| Win | 2. | 23 August 1999 | ITF Bucharest, Romania | 25,000 | Clay | (Spain) Lourdes Domínguez Lino | (Belarus) Nadejda Ostrovskaya (Slovakia) Zuzana Váleková | 7–5, 6–2 |
| Loss | 2. | 17 April 2000 | ITF Gelos, France | 25,000 | Clay | (Spain) Lourdes Domínguez Lino | (Spain) Eva Bes (Spain) Marta Marrero | 3–6, 4–6 |
| Loss | 3. | 22 September 2002 | ITF Biella, Italy | 50,000 | Clay | (Spain) María José Martínez Sánchez | (Bulgaria) Lubomira Bacheva (Spain) Eva Bes | 5–7, 6–2, 6–7^{(5)} |
| Win | 3. | 22 June 2003 | ITF Périgueux, France | 25,000 | Clay | (Spain) María José Martínez Sánchez | (Croatia) Lana Popadić (Madagascar) Natacha Randriantefy | 6–0, 6–3 |

== Team events ==
=== Hopman Cup (1–1) ===
| Result | Date | Location | Surface | Partner | Opponents | Score |
|---|---|---|---|---|---|---|
| Loss | 9 January 2007 | Perth | Hard | (Spain) Tommy Robredo | (Russia) Nadia Petrova (Russia) Dmitry Tursunov | 0–2 |
| Win | 5 January 2013 | Perth | Hard | (Spain) Fernando Verdasco | (Serbia) Ana Ivanovic (Serbia) Novak Djokovic | 2–1 |
