= 2004 Italian Open – Men's singles =

Men's singles
- 2004 Italian Open

Final
- Champion: (Spain) Carlos Moyá
- Runner-up: (Argentina) David Nalbandian
- Score: 6–3, 6–3, 6–1

Details
- Seeds: 16

Events
| Singles | men | women |
| Doubles | men | women |
| ← 2003 · | Italian Open | · 2005 → |

Carlos Moyá defeated David Nalbandian in the final, 6–3, 6–3, 6–1 to win the men's singles tennis title at the 2004 Italian Open.

Félix Mantilla was the defending champion, but lost in the second round to Mariano Zabaleta.

== Seeds ==
A champion seed is indicated in bold text while text in italics indicates the round in which that seed was eliminated.

1. (Switzerland) Roger Federer (second round)
2. (United States) Andy Roddick (first round)
3. (Germany) Rainer Schüttler (first round)
4. (United Kingdom) Tim Henman (third round)
5. (Argentina) David Nalbandian (final)
6. (Spain) **Carlos Moyá (champion)**
7. (France) Sébastien Grosjean (second round)
8. (Chile) Nicolás Massú (quarterfinals)
9. (Australia) Mark Philippoussis (first round)
10. (Thailand) Paradorn Srichaphan (second round)
11. (Netherlands) Sjeng Schalken (second round)
12. (Czech Republic) Jiří Novák (quarterfinals)
13. (Chile) Fernando González (second round)
14. (Netherlands) Martin Verkerk (second round)
15. (Australia) Lleyton Hewitt (second round)
16. (Argentina) Juan Ignacio Chela (first round)

== Draw ==
=== Key ===
- Q = Qualifier
- WC = Wild card
- LL = Lucky loser
- Alt = Alternate
- SE = Special exempt
- PR = Protected ranking
- ITF = ITF entry
- JE = Junior exempt
- w/o = Walkover
- r = Retired
- d = Defaulted
- SR = Special ranking

=== Finals ===
Semifinals
(Spain) Albert Costa | **7^{7}** | 1 | 4
5 | (Argentina) **David Nalbandian** | 6^{4} | **6** | **6**
(Argentina) Mariano Zabaleta | 3 | 4
6 | (Spain) **Carlos Moyá** | **6** | **6**

Final
5 | (Argentina) David Nalbandian | 3 | 3 | 1
6 | (Spain) **Carlos Moyá** | **6** | **6** | **6**

=== Top half ===
==== Section 1 ====
First round
1 | (Switzerland) **R Federer** | **7^{7}** | **6**
(Sweden) J Björkman | 6^{4} | 3
Q | (Spain) À Corretja | 6^{5} | 1
(Spain) **A Costa** | **7^{7}** | **6**
(Peru) **L Horna** | **6** | 4 | **7^{8}**
(Russia) M Youzhny | 0 | **6** | 6^{6}
(United States) T Martin | 5 | **6** | 3
14 | (Netherlands) **M Verkerk** | **7** | 3 | **6**
12 | (Czech Republic) **J Novák** | 2 | **6** | **6**
(United States) J Blake | **6** | 3 | 1
LL | (Austria) S Koubek | 2 | 4
(Belarus) **M Mirnyi** | **6** | **6**
Q | (Spain) **D Ferrer** | **6** | 2 | **6**
WC | (Italy) D Sanguinetti | 3 | **6** | 3
(Spain) F López | 5 | 2
7 | (France) **S Grosjean** | **7** | **6**

Second round
1 | (Switzerland) R Federer | **6** | 3 | 2
(Spain) **A Costa** | 3 | **6** | **6**
(Peru) **L Horna** | **6** | 3 | **6**
14 | (Netherlands) M Verkerk | 4 | **6** | 3
12 | (Czech Republic) **J Novák** | **6** | **6**
(Belarus) M Mirnyi | 1 | 1
Q | (Spain) **D Ferrer** | 6^{4} | **6** | **6**
7 | (France) S Grosjean | **7^{7}** | 3 | 2

Third round
(Spain) **A Costa** | **6** | **6**
(Peru) L Horna | 2 | 3
12 | (Czech Republic) **J Novák** | **6** | **7**
Q | (Spain) D Ferrer | 3 | 5

Quarterfinals
(Spain) **A Costa** | **6** | **6**
12 | (Czech Republic) J Novák | 4 | 2

==== Section 2 ====
First round
3 | (Germany) R Schüttler | 2 | **6** | 5
(United States) **V Spadea** | **6** | 2 | **7**
LL | (Spain) R Ramírez Hidalgo | 1 | 4
(Morocco) **H Arazi** | **6** | **6**
(Armenia) S Sargsian | 2 | 2
(Russia) **N Davydenko** | **6** | **6**
(Slovakia) D Hrbatý | 4 | 4
13 | (Chile) **F González** | **6** | **6**
11 | (Netherlands) **S Schalken** | **6** | 4 | **6**
Q | (Australia) W Arthurs | 3 | **6** | 1
(Italy) **F Volandri** | **6** | 0 | **6**
(Germany) N Kiefer | 4 | **6** | 0
Q | (Croatia) M Ančić | 4 | **6** | 6^{6}
(Brazil) **F Saretta** | **6** | 3 | **7^{8}**
(Sweden) R Söderling | 4 | 4
5 | (Argentina) **D Nalbandian** | **6** | **6**

Second round
(United States) **V Spadea** | 2 | **6** | **6**
(Morocco) H Arazi | **6** | 2 | 4
(Russia) **N Davydenko** | 2 | **6** | **6**
13 | (Chile) F González | **6** | 2 | 4
11 | (Netherlands) S Schalken | 2 | 3
(Italy) **F Volandri** | **6** | **6**
(Brazil) F Saretta | 2 | 4
5 | (Argentina) **D Nalbandian** | **6** | **6**

Third round
(United States) **V Spadea** | 4 | **6** | **6**
(Russia) N Davydenko | **6** | 3 | 4
(Italy) F Volandri | 6^{4} | **6** | 4
5 | (Argentina) **D Nalbandian** | **7^{7}** | 3 | **6**

Quarterfinals
(United States) V Spadea | 4 | 3
5 | (Argentina) **D Nalbandian** | **6** | **6**

=== Bottom half ===
==== Section 3 ====
First round
8 | (Chile) **N Massú** | 6^{9} | **7** | **6**
Q | (Italy) M Dell'Acqua | **7^{11}** | 5 | 3
(Georgia (country)) **I Labadze** | **6** | **6**
(Argentina) G Gaudio | 3 | 2
WC | (Italy) S Pescosolido | 4 | 3
(Russia) **M Safin** | **6** | **6**
WC | (Italy) A di Mauro | 6^{3} | **6** | 3
10 | (Thailand) **P Srichaphan** | **7^{7}** | 3 | **6**
16 | (Argentina) J I Chela | 4 | 2
(Argentina) **M Zabaleta** | **6** | **6**
(Spain) **F Mantilla** | 5 | **7** | **6**
(United States) R Ginepri | **7** | 5 | 0
(Czech Republic) **R Štěpánek** | **6** | **6**
(Croatia) G Ivanišević | 2 | 4
Q | (Germany) F Mayer | 5 | 1
4 | (United Kingdom) **T Henman** | **7** | **6**

Second round
8 | (Chile) **N Massú** | **6** | **7**
(Georgia (country)) I Labadze | 2 | 5
(Russia) **M Safin** | **6** | **6**
10 | (Thailand) P Srichaphan | 2 | 2
(Argentina) **M Zabaleta** | **7** | **6**
(Spain) F Mantilla | 5 | 3
(Czech Republic) R Štěpánek | 1 | 1
4 | (United Kingdom) **T Henman** | **6** | **6**

Third round
8 | (Chile) **N Massú** | **7** | **6**
(Russia) M Safin | 5 | 4
(Argentina) **M Zabaleta** | 3 | **6** | **6**
4 | (United Kingdom) T Henman | **6** | 3 | 2

Quarterfinals
8 | (Chile) N Massú | 1 | 5
(Argentina) **M Zabaleta** | **6** | **7**

==== Section 4 ====
First round
6 | (Spain) **C Moyá** | **6** | **6**
(Spain) A Martín | 4 | 2
(France) A Clément | 3 | **6** | 6^{3}
(Croatia) **I Ljubičić** | **6** | 2 | **7^{7}**
(Germany) T Haas | 5 | **6** | 6^{5}
Q | (Croatia) **I Karlović** | **7** | 4 | **7^{7}**
(Spain) **T Robredo** | **6** | 4 | **6**
9 | (Australia) M Philippoussis | 2 | **6** | 4
15 | (Australia) **L Hewitt** | 5 | **7** | **6**
WC | (Italy) A Seppi | **7** | 5 | 3
(Ecuador) N Lapentti | 4 | 3
(Romania) **A Pavel** | **6** | **6**
Q | (Russia) I Andreev | 2 | 3
(Spain) **D Sánchez** | **6** | **6**
(Argentina) **G Cañas** | **7^{9}** | **6**
2 | (United States) A Roddick | 6^{7} | 1

Second round
6 | (Spain) **C Moyá** | **6** | **6**
(Croatia) I Ljubičić | 2 | 4
Q | (Croatia) **I Karlović** | **7^{7}** | **6**
(Spain) T Robredo | 6^{5} | 4
15 | (Australia) L Hewitt | **6** | 3 | 4
(Romania) **A Pavel** | 4 | **6** | **6**
(Spain) **D Sánchez** | **7** | **6**
(Argentina) G Cañas | 5 | 2

Third round
6 | (Spain) **C Moyá** | **6** | 3 | **6**
Q | (Croatia) I Karlović | 4 | **6** | 4
(Romania) **A Pavel** | **7^{7}** | **7^{7}**
(Spain) D Sánchez | 6^{3} | 6^{5}

Quarterfinals
6 | (Spain) **C Moyá** | **6** | **6**
(Romania) A Pavel | 1 | 2
