= 2004 Italian Open – Women's doubles =

Women's doubles
- 2004 Italian Open

Final
- Champions: (Russia) Nadia Petrova (United States) Meghann Shaughnessy
- Runners-up: (Spain) Virginia Ruano Pascual (Argentina) Paola Suárez
- Score: 2–6, 6–3, 6–3

Events
| Singles | men | women |
| Doubles | men | women |
| ← 2003 · | Italian Open | · 2005 → |

Svetlana Kuznetsova and Martina Navratilova were the defending champions, but Kuznetsova decided not to compete this year. Navratilova teamed up with Lisa Raymond and lost in second round to Elena Likhovtseva and Anastasia Myskina.

Nadia Petrova and Meghann Shaughnessy won the title, defeating Virginia Ruano Pascual and Paola Suárez 2–6, 6–3, 6–3 in the final. It was the 8th title for Petrova and the 8th title for Shaughnessy in their respective careers. It was also the 4th title for the pair during this season.

== Seeds ==
The first four seeds received a bye into the second round.

1. (Spain) Virginia Ruano Pascual / (Argentina) Paola Suárez (final)
2. (South Africa) Liezel Huber / (Japan) Ai Sugiyama (second round)
3. (United States) Martina Navratilova / (United States) Lisa Raymond (second round)
4. (Russia) Nadia Petrova / (United States) Meghann Shaughnessy (champions)
5. (Zimbabwe) Cara Black / (Belgium) Els Callens (first round)
6. (Slovakia) Janette Husárová / (Spain) Conchita Martínez (semifinals)
7. (China) Li Ting / (China) Sun Tiantian (semifinals)
8. (France) Marion Bartoli / (United States) Meilen Tu (first round)

== Draw ==
=== Key ===
- Q = Qualifier
- WC = Wild card
- LL = Lucky loser
- Alt = Alternate
- ITF = ITF entry
- PR = Protected ranking
- SR = Special ranking
- SE = Special exempt
- JE = Junior exempt
- JR = Junior Accelerator Programme entrant
- CO = College Accelerator Programme entrant
- NG = Next Gen Accelerator Program entrant
- w/o = Walkover
- r = Retired
- d = Defaulted

=== Finals ===
Semifinals
1 | (Spain) Virginia Ruano Pascual (Argentina) Paola Suárez | 6 | 6
7 | (China) Li Ting (China) Sun Tiantian | 4 | 2
4 | (Russia) Nadia Petrova (United States) Meghann Shaughnessy | 6 | 7^{7}
6 | (Slovakia) Janette Husárová (Spain) Conchita Martínez | 2 | 6^{4}

Final
1 | (Spain) Virginia Ruano Pascual (Argentina) Paola Suárez | 6 | 3 | 3
4 | (Russia) Nadia Petrova (United States) Meghann Shaughnessy | 2 | 6 | 6

=== Top half ===
First round
(Italy) R Grande (Venezuela) M Vento-Kabchi | 6^{11} | 2
(Argentina) G Dulko (Russia) M Sharapova | 7^{13} | 6
(Russia) E Bovina (France) N Dechy | 6 | 7
(Australia) L McShea (Venezuela) M Sequera | 3 | 5
PR | (Czech Republic) K Peschke (Germany) B Rittner | 6^{4} | 6 | 6
5 | (Zimbabwe) C Black (Belgium) E Callens | 7^{7} | 2 | 4
(Russia) A Jidkova (United States) A Spears | 0 | 7 | 2
(Russia) E Likhovtseva (Russia) A Myskina | 6 | 5 | 6
WC | (Italy) T Garbin (Italy) M Santangelo | 6 | 5 | 0
(Austria) B Schett (Argentina) P Tarabini | 3 | 7 | 6
(United States) L Granville (Ukraine) T Perebiynis | 2 | 4
7 | (China) T Li (China) T Sun | 6 | 6

Second round
1 | (Spain) V Ruano Pascual (Argentina) P Suárez | 6 | 6
(Argentina) G Dulko (Russia) M Sharapova | 1 | 1
(Russia) E Bovina (France) N Dechy | 6 | 6
PR | (Czech Republic) K Peschke (Germany) B Rittner | 1 | 3
3 | (United States) M Navratilova (United States) L Raymond | 6^{4} | 7^{8} | 3
(Russia) E Likhovtseva (Russia) A Myskina | 7^{7} | 6^{6} | 6
(Austria) B Schett (Argentina) P Tarabini | 3 | 2
7 | (China) T Li (China) T Sun | 6 | 6

Quarterfinals
1 | (Spain) V Ruano Pascual (Argentina) P Suárez | 6 | 6
(Russia) E Bovina (France) N Dechy | 4 | 0
(Russia) E Likhovtseva (Russia) A Myskina | 6^{3} | 5
7 | (China) T Li (China) T Sun | 7^{7} | 7

Semifinals
1 | (Spain) V Ruano Pascual (Argentina) P Suárez | 6 | 6
7 | (China) T Li (China) T Sun | 4 | 2

=== Bottom half ===
First round
8 | (France) M Bartoli (United States) M Tu | 6 | 5 | 1
(Slovakia) D Hantuchová (Russia) D Safina | 2 | 7 | 6
(Estonia) M Ani (Switzerland) E Gagliardi | 3 | 6 | 7
(China) Z Yan (China) J Zheng | 6 | 4 | 5
(Italy) S Farina Elia (Italy) F Schiavone | 6 | 3 | 6^{5}
PR | (France) S Testud (Italy) R Vinci | 2 | 6 | 7^{7}
6 | (Slovakia) J Husárová (Spain) C Martínez | 6 | 6
Q | (Italy) ME Camerin (Spain) M Marrero | 2 | 4
(Australia) A Molik (Spain) M Serna | 4 | 4
WC | (Italy) Ad Serra Zanetti (Italy) An Serra Zanetti | 6 | 6
WC | (France) M Pierce (Spain) A Sánchez Vicario | 1 | 6 | 3
(Russia) E Dementieva (Australia) N Pratt | 6 | 0 | 6

Second round
(Slovakia) D Hantuchová (Russia) D Safina | 6^{1} | 6 | 2
(Estonia) M Ani (Switzerland) E Gagliardi | 7^{7} | 3 | 6
PR | (France) S Testud (Italy) R Vinci | 3 | 1
4 | (Russia) N Petrova (United States) M Shaughnessy | 6 | 6
6 | (Slovakia) J Husárová (Spain) C Martínez | 7 | 6
WC | (Italy) Ad Serra Zanetti (Italy) An Serra Zanetti | 5 | 3
(Russia) E Dementieva (Australia) N Pratt | 7 | 7
2 | (South Africa) L Huber (Japan) A Sugiyama | 5 | 5

Quarterfinals
(Estonia) M Ani (Switzerland) E Gagliardi | 1 | 3
4 | (Russia) N Petrova (United States) M Shaughnessy | 6 | 6
6 | (Slovakia) J Husárová (Spain) C Martínez | 6 | 6
(Russia) E Dementieva (Australia) N Pratt | 4 | 1

Semifinals
4 | (Russia) N Petrova (United States) M Shaughnessy | 6 | 7^{7}
6 | (Slovakia) J Husárová (Spain) C Martínez | 2 | 6^{4}
