= 2004 Italian Open – Men's doubles =

Men's doubles
- 2004 Italian Open

Final
- Champions: (India) Mahesh Bhupathi (Belarus) Max Mirnyi
- Runners-up: (Australia) Wayne Arthurs (Australia) Paul Hanley
- Score: 2–6, 6–3, 6–4

Events
Singles	men	women
Doubles	men	women
← 2003 ·	Italian Open	· 2005 →

Mahesh Bhupathi and Max Mirnyi defeated defending champions Wayne Arthurs and Paul Hanley 2–6, 6–3, 6–4 in the final. It was the 34th title for Bhupathi and the 20th title for Mirnyi in their respective careers.

== Seeds ==
All seeds received a bye into the second round.

1. (United States) Bob Bryan / (United States) Mike Bryan (semifinals)
2. (Sweden) Jonas Björkman / (Australia) Todd Woodbridge (semifinals)
3. (India) Mahesh Bhupathi / (Belarus) Max Mirnyi (champions)
4. (The Bahamas) Mark Knowles / (Canada) Daniel Nestor (quarterfinals)
5. (France) Michaël Llodra / (France) Fabrice Santoro (quarterfinals)
6. (Australia) Wayne Arthurs / (Australia) Paul Hanley (final)
7. (Czech Republic) Martin Damm / (Czech Republic) Cyril Suk (second round)
8. (Zimbabwe) Wayne Black / (Zimbabwe) Kevin Ullyett (quarterfinals)

== Draw ==
Key

- Q = Qualifier
- WC = Wild card
- LL = Lucky loser
- Alt = Alternate
- ITF = ITF entry
- PR = Protected ranking
- SR = Special ranking
- SE = Special exempt
- JE = Junior exempt
- JR = Junior Accelerator Programme entrant
- CO = College Accelerator Programme entrant
- NG = Next Gen Accelerator Program entrant
- w/o = Walkover
- r = Retired
- d = Defaulted

=== Finals ===
Semifinals
1	(United States) Bob Bryan (United States) Mike Bryan	4	1
6	(Australia) Wayne Arthurs (Australia) Paul Hanley	6	6
3	(India) Mahesh Bhupathi (Belarus) Max Mirnyi	6^{6}	6	6
2	(Sweden) Jonas Björkman (Australia) Todd Woodbridge	7^{8}	2	4

Final
6	(Australia) Wayne Arthurs (Australia) Paul Hanley	6	3	4
3	(India) Mahesh Bhupathi (Belarus) Max Mirnyi	2	6	6

=== Top half ===
First round
(Argentina) L Arnold Ker (Armenia) S Sargsian	6	5	4
(Australia) M Philippoussis (Russia) M Safin	3	7	6
WC	(Italy) M Bertolini (Italy) G Galimberti	6	4	4
(Argentina) G Cañas (Argentina) JI Chela	1	6	6
(Israel) J Erlich (Israel) A Ram	5	7^{11}	6^{5}
(Argentina) G Etlis (Argentina) M Rodríguez	7	6^{9}	7^{7}
(India) L Paes (Czech Republic) D Rikl	7^{7}	7
(Argentina) M Hood (Argentina) S Prieto	6^{5}	5

Second round
1	(United States) B Bryan (United States) M Bryan	6^{3}	7	6
(Australia) M Philippoussis (Russia) M Safin	7^{7}	5	3
(Argentina) G Cañas (Argentina) JI Chela	6	6
7	(Czech Republic) M Damm (Czech Republic) C Suk	3	4
4	(The Bahamas) M Knowles (Canada) D Nestor	7^{7}	6
(Argentina) G Etlis (Argentina) M Rodríguez	6^{3}	4
(India) L Paes (Czech Republic) D Rikl	3	2
6	(Australia) W Arthurs (Australia) P Hanley	6	6

Quarterfinals
1	(United States) B Bryan (United States) M Bryan	6	7
(Argentina) G Cañas (Argentina) JI Chela	3	5
4	(The Bahamas) M Knowles (Canada) D Nestor	3	6	4
6	(Australia) W Arthurs (Australia) P Hanley	6	4	6

Semifinals
1	(United States) B Bryan (United States) M Bryan	4	1
6	(Australia) W Arthurs (Australia) P Hanley	6	6

=== Bottom half ===
First round
(Czech Republic) J Novák (Thailand) P Srichaphan	2	4
(United States) J Palmer (Czech Republic) P Vízner	6	6
Alt	(Italy) S Pescosolido (Italy) V Santopadre	6	4	4
WC	(Switzerland) Y Allegro (Switzerland) R Federer	4	6	6
(Chile) F González (Chile) N Massú	4	2
(Czech Republic) F Čermák (Czech Republic) L Friedl	6	6
Alt	(Croatia) G Ivanišević (Croatia) L Ljubičić	3	2
(France) A Clément (Serbia and Montenegro) N Zimonjić	6	6

Second round
5	(France) M Llodra (France) F Santoro	7^{7}	7
(United States) J Palmer (Czech Republic) P Vízner	6^{4}	5
WC	(Switzerland) Y Allegro (Switzerland) R Federer	6	5	5
3	(India) M Bhupathi (Belarus) M Mirnyi	3	7	7
8	(Zimbabwe) W Black (Zimbabwe) K Ullyett	1	6	7^{7}
(Czech Republic) F Čermák (Czech Republic) L Friedl	6	4	6^{1}
(France) A Clément (Serbia and Montenegro) N Zimonjić	5	6^{3}
2	(Sweden) J Björkman (Australia) T Woodbridge	7	7^{7}

Quarterfinals
5	(France) M Llodra (France) F Santoro	5	3
3	(India) M Bhupathi (Belarus) M Mirnyi	7	6
8	(Zimbabwe) W Black (Zimbabwe) K Ullyett	2	6^{6}
2	(Sweden) J Björkman (Australia) T Woodbridge	6	7^{8}

Semifinals
3	(India) M Bhupathi (Belarus) M Mirnyi	6^{6}	6	6
2	(Sweden) J Björkman (Australia) T Woodbridge	7^{8}	2	4
