= 2003 WTA Tour =

Women's tennis circuit

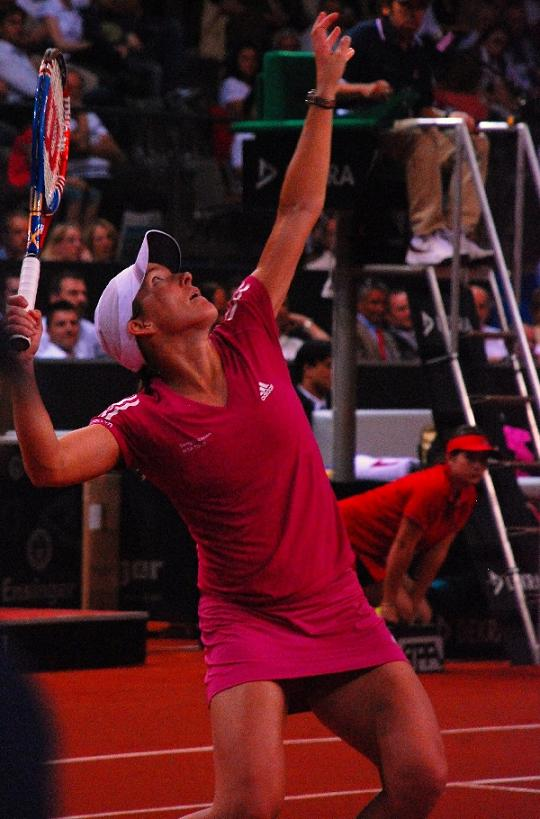
- Justine Henin-Hardenne finished the year as world No. 1 for the first time in her career. She won eight tournaments during the season, including two majors at the French Open and the US Open. She also won four Tier I events.

Details
- Duration: December 28, 2002 – November 20, 2003
- Edition: 33rd
- Tournaments: 59
- Categories: Grand Slam (4); WTA Championships; WTA Tier I (9); WTA Tier II (17); WTA Tier III (16); WTA Tier IV (6); WTA Tier V (6)

Achievements (singles)
- Most titles: (Belgium) Kim Clijsters (9)
- Most finals: (Belgium) Kim Clijsters (15)
- Prize money leader: (Belgium) Kim Clijsters ($4,466,345)
- Points leader: (Belgium) Justine Henin-Hardenne (6,628)

Awards
- Player of the year: (Belgium) Justine Henin-Hardenne
- Doubles team of the year: (Spain) Virginia Ruano Pascual (Argentina) Paola Suárez
- Most improved player of the year: (Russia) Nadia Petrova
- Newcomer of the year: (Russia) Maria Sharapova
- Comeback player of the year: (France) Amélie Mauresmo

The 2003 WTA Tour was the elite professional tennis circuit organized by the Women's Tennis Association (WTA) for the 2003 tennis season. The 2003 WTA Tour included the four Grand Slam tournaments, the WTA Tour Championships and the WTA Tier I, Tier II, Tier III, Tier IV and Tier V events. ITF tournaments were not part of the 2003 WTA Tour, although they award points for the WTA World Ranking.

== Schedule ==
The table below shows the 2003 WTA Tour schedule.

=== Key ===
Grand Slam events
Year-end championships
Tier I events
Tier II events
Tier III events
Tier IV and V events
Team events

=== January ===
Week	Tournament	Champions	Runners-up	Semifinalists	Quarterfinalists
30 Dec	Hopman Cup; Perth, Australia; Hopman Cup; Hard (i) – 8 teams (RR)	United States; 3–0	Australia	Round robin losers (Group A) Belgium; Spain; Uzbekistan	Round robin losers (Group B) Czech Republic; Slovakia; Italy
30 Dec	Uncle Tobys Hardcourts; Gold Coast, Australia; Tier III event Hard – $170,000 – 30S/32Q/16D; Singles – Doubles	(France) Nathalie Dechy; 6–3, 3–6, 6–3	(Switzerland) Marie-Gayanay Mikaelian	(Switzerland) Patty Schnyder (Russia) Elena Bovina	(United States) Meghann Shaughnessy (Spain) María Sánchez Lorenzo (Italy) Tathiana Garbin (Austria) Barbara Schett
30 Dec	Uncle Tobys Hardcourts; Gold Coast, Australia; Tier III event Hard – $170,000 – 30S/32Q/16D; Singles – Doubles	(Russia) Svetlana Kuznetsova (United States) Martina Navratilova; 6–4, 6–4	(France) Nathalie Dechy (France) Émilie Loit	(Switzerland) Patty Schnyder (Russia) Elena Bovina	(United States) Meghann Shaughnessy (Spain) María Sánchez Lorenzo (Italy) Tathiana Garbin (Austria) Barbara Schett
30 Dec	ASB Classic; Auckland, New Zealand; Tier IV event Hard – $140,000 – 32S/32Q/16D; Singles – Doubles	(Greece) Eleni Daniilidou; 6–4, 4–6, 7–6^{(7–2)}	(South Korea) Cho Yoon-jeong	(Israel) Anna Pistolesi (Switzerland) Emmanuelle Gagliardi	(United States) Jill Craybas (Russia) Vera Zvonareva (United States) Laura Granville (Argentina) Paola Suárez
30 Dec	ASB Classic; Auckland, New Zealand; Tier IV event Hard – $140,000 – 32S/32Q/16D; Singles – Doubles	(United States) Teryn Ashley (United States) Abigail Spears; 6–2, 2–6, 6–0	(Zimbabwe) Cara Black (Russia) Elena Likhovtseva	(Israel) Anna Pistolesi (Switzerland) Emmanuelle Gagliardi	(United States) Jill Craybas (Russia) Vera Zvonareva (United States) Laura Granville (Argentina) Paola Suárez
6 Jan	Adidas International; Sydney, Australia; Tier II event Hard – $585,000 – 28S/32Q/16D; Singles – Doubles	(Belgium) Kim Clijsters; 6–4, 6–3	(United States) Lindsay Davenport	(Russia) Tatiana Panova (Belgium) Justine Henin-Hardenne	(Belarus) Olga Barabanschikova (Slovakia) Daniela Hantuchová (South Africa) Amanda Coetzer (United States) Chanda Rubin
6 Jan	Adidas International; Sydney, Australia; Tier II event Hard – $585,000 – 28S/32Q/16D; Singles – Doubles	(Belgium) Kim Clijsters (Japan) Ai Sugiyama; 6–3, 6–3	(Spain) Conchita Martínez (Australia) Rennae Stubbs	(Russia) Tatiana Panova (Belgium) Justine Henin-Hardenne	(Belarus) Olga Barabanschikova (Slovakia) Daniela Hantuchová (South Africa) Amanda Coetzer (United States) Chanda Rubin
6 Jan	Moorilla International; Hobart, Australia; Tier V event Hard – $110,000 – 32S/32Q/16D; Singles – Doubles	(Australia) Alicia Molik; 6–2, 4–6, 6–4	(United States) Amy Frazier	(Czech Republic) Iveta Benešová (Russia) Elena Likhovtseva	(Russia) Vera Zvonareva (Japan) Shinobu Asagoe (United States) Jill Craybas (Germany) Angelika Rösch
6 Jan	Moorilla International; Hobart, Australia; Tier V event Hard – $110,000 – 32S/32Q/16D; Singles – Doubles	(Zimbabwe) Cara Black (Russia) Elena Likhovtseva; 7–5, 7–6^{(7–1)}	(Austria) Barbara Schett (Austria) Patricia Wartusch	(Czech Republic) Iveta Benešová (Russia) Elena Likhovtseva	(Russia) Vera Zvonareva (Japan) Shinobu Asagoe (United States) Jill Craybas (Germany) Angelika Rösch
6 Jan	Canberra Women's Classic; Canberra, Australia; Tier V event Hard – $110,000 – 32S/32Q/16D; Singles – Doubles	(United States) Meghann Shaughnessy; 6–1, 6–1	(Italy) Francesca Schiavone	(France) Marion Bartoli (France) Émilie Loit	(Germany) Marlene Weingärtner (Italy) Adriana Serra Zanetti (Italy) Flavia Pennetta (Spain) Magüi Serna
6 Jan	Canberra Women's Classic; Canberra, Australia; Tier V event Hard – $110,000 – 32S/32Q/16D; Singles – Doubles	(Italy) Tathiana Garbin (France) Émilie Loit; 6–3, 3–6, 6–4	(Czech Republic) Dája Bedáňová (Russia) Dinara Safina	(France) Marion Bartoli (France) Émilie Loit	(Germany) Marlene Weingärtner (Italy) Adriana Serra Zanetti (Italy) Flavia Pennetta (Spain) Magüi Serna
13 Jany; 20 Jany	Australian Open; Melbourne, Australia; Grand Slam; Hard – $4,054,063 – 128S/96Q/64D/32X; Singles – Doubles – Mixed doubles	(United States) Serena Williams; 7–6^{(7–4)}, 3–6, 6–4	(United States) Venus Williams	(Belgium) Kim Clijsters (Belgium) Justine Henin-Hardenne	(United States) Meghann Shaughnessy (Russia) Anastasia Myskina (Spain) Virginia Ruano Pascual (Slovakia) Daniela Hantuchová
13 Jany; 20 Jany	Australian Open; Melbourne, Australia; Grand Slam; Hard – $4,054,063 – 128S/96Q/64D/32X; Singles – Doubles – Mixed doubles	(United States) Serena Williams (United States) Venus Williams; 4–6, 6–4, 6–3	(Spain) Virginia Ruano Pascual (Argentina) Paola Suárez	(Belgium) Kim Clijsters (Belgium) Justine Henin-Hardenne	(United States) Meghann Shaughnessy (Russia) Anastasia Myskina (Spain) Virginia Ruano Pascual (Slovakia) Daniela Hantuchová
13 Jany; 20 Jany	Australian Open; Melbourne, Australia; Grand Slam; Hard – $4,054,063 – 128S/96Q/64D/32X; Singles – Doubles – Mixed doubles	(India) Leander Paes (United States) Martina Navratilova; 6–4, 7–5	(Australia) Todd Woodbridge (Greece) Eleni Daniilidou	(Belgium) Kim Clijsters (Belgium) Justine Henin-Hardenne	(United States) Meghann Shaughnessy (Russia) Anastasia Myskina (Spain) Virginia Ruano Pascual (Slovakia) Daniela Hantuchová
27 Jan	Toray Pan Pacific Open; Tokyo, Japan; Tier I event Carpet (i) – $1,300,000 – 28S/32Q/16D; Singles – Doubles	(United States) Lindsay Davenport; 6–7^{(6–8)}, 6–1, 6–2	(United States) Monica Seles	(United States) Chanda Rubin (United States) Lisa Raymond	(Russia) Lina Krasnoroutskaya (Russia) Elena Dementieva (Thailand) Tamarine Tanasugarn (Federal Republic of Yugoslavia) Jelena Dokić
27 Jan	Toray Pan Pacific Open; Tokyo, Japan; Tier I event Carpet (i) – $1,300,000 – 28S/32Q/16D; Singles – Doubles	(Russia) Elena Bovina (Australia) Rennae Stubbs; 6–3, 6–4	(United States) Lindsay Davenport (United States) Lisa Raymond	(United States) Chanda Rubin (United States) Lisa Raymond	(Russia) Lina Krasnoroutskaya (Russia) Elena Dementieva (Thailand) Tamarine Tanasugarn (Federal Republic of Yugoslavia) Jelena Dokić

=== February ===
Week	Tournament	Champions	Runners-up	Semifinalists	Quarterfinalists
3 Feb	Open Gaz de France; Paris, France; Tier II event Hard (i) – $585,000 – 28S/32Q/16D; Singles – Doubles	(United States) Serena Williams; 6–3, 6–2	(France) Amélie Mauresmo	(Greece) Eleni Daniilidou (Russia) Elena Dementieva	(Slovakia) Janette Husárová (Federal Republic of Yugoslavia) Jelena Dokić (Spain) Magüi Serna (Slovakia) Daniela Hantuchová
3 Feb	Open Gaz de France; Paris, France; Tier II event Hard (i) – $585,000 – 28S/32Q/16D; Singles – Doubles	(Austria) Barbara Schett (Switzerland) Patty Schnyder; 2–6, 6–2, 7–6^{(7–5)}	(France) Marion Bartoli (France) Stéphanie Cohen-Aloro	(Greece) Eleni Daniilidou (Russia) Elena Dementieva	(Slovakia) Janette Husárová (Federal Republic of Yugoslavia) Jelena Dokić (Spain) Magüi Serna (Slovakia) Daniela Hantuchová
3 Feb	AP Tourism Hyderabad Open; Hyderabad, India; Tier IV event Hard – $140,000 – 32S/32Q/16D; Singles – Doubles	(Thailand) Tamarine Tanasugarn; 6–4, 6–4	(Uzbekistan) Iroda Tulyaganova	(Japan) Akiko Morigami (Italy) Flavia Pennetta	(Croatia) Silvija Talaja (Israel) Tzipora Obziler (France) Mary Pierce (Russia) Maria Kirilenko
3 Feb	AP Tourism Hyderabad Open; Hyderabad, India; Tier IV event Hard – $140,000 – 32S/32Q/16D; Singles – Doubles	(Russia) Elena Likhovtseva (Uzbekistan) Iroda Tulyaganova; 6–4, 6–4	(Russia) Evgenia Kulikovskaya (Belarus) Tatiana Poutchek	(Japan) Akiko Morigami (Italy) Flavia Pennetta	(Croatia) Silvija Talaja (Israel) Tzipora Obziler (France) Mary Pierce (Russia) Maria Kirilenko
10 Feb	Proximus Diamond Games; Antwerp, Belgium; Tier II event Hard (i) – $585,000 – 28S/32Q/16D; Singles – Doubles	(United States) Venus Williams; 6–2, 6–4	(Belgium) Kim Clijsters	(Slovakia) Daniela Hantuchová (Belgium) Justine Henin-Hardenne	(Slovenia) Tina Pisnik (France) Nathalie Dechy (Japan) Ai Sugiyama (Switzerland) Patty Schnyder
10 Feb	Proximus Diamond Games; Antwerp, Belgium; Tier II event Hard (i) – $585,000 – 28S/32Q/16D; Singles – Doubles	(Belgium) Kim Clijsters (Japan) Ai Sugiyama; 6–2, 6–0	(France) Nathalie Dechy (France) Émilie Loit	(Slovakia) Daniela Hantuchová (Belgium) Justine Henin-Hardenne	(Slovenia) Tina Pisnik (France) Nathalie Dechy (Japan) Ai Sugiyama (Switzerland) Patty Schnyder
10 Feb	Qatar Total Fina Elf Open; Doha, Qatar; Tier III event Hard – $170,000 – 30S/32Q/16D; Singles – Doubles	(Russia) Anastasia Myskina; 6–3, 6–1	(Russia) Elena Likhovtseva	(Russia) Lina Krasnoroutskaya (Austria) Patricia Wartusch	(Spain) Conchita Martínez (Bulgaria) Magdalena Maleeva (Australia) Nicole Pratt (Russia) Dinara Safina
10 Feb	Qatar Total Fina Elf Open; Doha, Qatar; Tier III event Hard – $170,000 – 30S/32Q/16D; Singles – Doubles	(Chinese Taipei) Janet Lee (Indonesia) Wynne Prakusya; 6–1, 6–3	(Venezuela) María Vento-Kabchi (Indonesia) Angelique Widjaja	(Russia) Lina Krasnoroutskaya (Austria) Patricia Wartusch	(Spain) Conchita Martínez (Bulgaria) Magdalena Maleeva (Australia) Nicole Pratt (Russia) Dinara Safina
17 Feb	Dubai Tennis Championships; Dubai, United Arab Emirates; Tier II event Hard – $585,000 – 28S/32Q/16D; Singles – Doubles	(Belgium) Justine Henin-Hardenne; 4–6, 7–6^{(7–4)}, 7–5	(United States) Monica Seles	(United States) Jennifer Capriati (France) Amélie Mauresmo	(Russia) Anastasia Myskina (Spain) Conchita Martínez (Uzbekistan) Iroda Tulyaganova (Russia) Lina Krasnoroutskaya
17 Feb	Dubai Tennis Championships; Dubai, United Arab Emirates; Tier II event Hard – $585,000 – 28S/32Q/16D; Singles – Doubles	(Russia) Svetlana Kuznetsova (United States) Martina Navratilova; 6–3, 7–6^{(9–7)}	(Zimbabwe) Cara Black (Russia) Elena Likhovtseva	(United States) Jennifer Capriati (France) Amélie Mauresmo	(Russia) Anastasia Myskina (Spain) Conchita Martínez (Uzbekistan) Iroda Tulyaganova (Russia) Lina Krasnoroutskaya
17 Feb	Cellular South Cup; Memphis, United States; Tier III event Hard (i) – $170,000 – 30S/32Q/16D; Singles – Doubles	(United States) Lisa Raymond; 6–3, 6–2	(South Africa) Amanda Coetzer	(United States) Laura Granville (South Korea) Cho Yoon-jeong	(Italy) Silvia Farina Elia (France) Stéphanie Foretz (Japan) Saori Obata (United States) Carly Gullickson
17 Feb	Cellular South Cup; Memphis, United States; Tier III event Hard (i) – $170,000 – 30S/32Q/16D; Singles – Doubles	(Japan) Akiko Morigami (Japan) Saori Obata; 6–1, 6–1	(Russia) Alina Jidkova (Australia) Bryanne Stewart	(United States) Laura Granville (South Korea) Cho Yoon-jeong	(Italy) Silvia Farina Elia (France) Stéphanie Foretz (Japan) Saori Obata (United States) Carly Gullickson
17 Feb	Copa Colsanitas; Bogotá, Colombia; Tier III event Clay – $170,000 – 30S/32Q/16D; Singles – Doubles	(Colombia) Fabiola Zuluaga; 6–3, 6–2	(Spain) Anabel Medina Garrigues	(Argentina) Paola Suárez (Slovenia) Katarina Srebotnik	(Spain) Conchita Martínez Granados (Hungary) Katalin Marosi (Colombia) Catalina Castaño (Italy) Flavia Pennetta
17 Feb	Copa Colsanitas; Bogotá, Colombia; Tier III event Clay – $170,000 – 30S/32Q/16D; Singles – Doubles	(Slovenia) Katarina Srebotnik (Sweden) Åsa Svensson; 6–2, 6–1	(Slovenia) Tina Križan (Ukraine) Tatiana Perebiynis	(Argentina) Paola Suárez (Slovenia) Katarina Srebotnik	(Spain) Conchita Martínez Granados (Hungary) Katalin Marosi (Colombia) Catalina Castaño (Italy) Flavia Pennetta
24 Feb	State Farm Women's Tennis Classic; Scottsdale, United States; Tier II event Hard – $585,000 – 28S/30Q/16D; Singles – Doubles	(Japan) Ai Sugiyama; 3–6, 7–5, 6–4	(Belgium) Kim Clijsters	(United States) Alexandra Stevenson (United States) Meghann Shaughnessy	(France) Nathalie Dechy (Greece) Eleni Daniilidou (Italy) Francesca Schiavone (United States) Laura Granville
24 Feb	State Farm Women's Tennis Classic; Scottsdale, United States; Tier II event Hard – $585,000 – 28S/30Q/16D; Singles – Doubles	(Belgium) Kim Clijsters (Japan) Ai Sugiyama; 6–1, 6–4	(United States) Lindsay Davenport (United States) Lisa Raymond	(United States) Alexandra Stevenson (United States) Meghann Shaughnessy	(France) Nathalie Dechy (Greece) Eleni Daniilidou (Italy) Francesca Schiavone (United States) Laura Granville
24 Feb	Abierto Mexicano Telefónica Movistar; Acapulco, Mexico; Tier III event Clay – $170,000 – 30S/30Q/16D; Singles – Doubles	(South Africa) Amanda Coetzer; 7–5, 6–3	(Argentina) Mariana Díaz Oliva	(Japan) Shinobu Asagoe (France) Émilie Loit	(Spain) Cristina Torrens Valero (Czech Republic) Alena Vašková (Hungary) Petra Mandula (Italy) Flavia Pennetta
24 Feb	Abierto Mexicano Telefónica Movistar; Acapulco, Mexico; Tier III event Clay – $170,000 – 30S/30Q/16D; Singles – Doubles	(France) Émilie Loit (Sweden) Åsa Svensson; 6–3, 6–1	(Hungary) Petra Mandula (Austria) Patricia Wartusch	(Japan) Shinobu Asagoe (France) Émilie Loit	(Spain) Cristina Torrens Valero (Czech Republic) Alena Vašková (Hungary) Petra Mandula (Italy) Flavia Pennetta

=== March ===
Week	Tournament	Champions	Runners-up	Semifinalists	Quarterfinalists
3 Mar; 10 Mar	Pacific Life Open; Indian Wells, United States; Tier I event Hard – $2,100,000 – 96S/48Q/32D; Singles – Doubles	(Belgium) Kim Clijsters; 6–4, 7–5	(United States) Lindsay Davenport	(Spain) Conchita Martínez (United States) Jennifer Capriati	(United States) Chanda Rubin (South Africa) Amanda Coetzer (France) Amélie Mauresmo (Russia) Vera Zvonareva
3 Mar; 10 Mar	Pacific Life Open; Indian Wells, United States; Tier I event Hard – $2,100,000 – 96S/48Q/32D; Singles – Doubles	(United States) Lindsay Davenport (United States) Lisa Raymond; 2–6, 6–2, 7–6^{(7–5)}	(Belgium) Kim Clijsters (Japan) Ai Sugiyama	(Spain) Conchita Martínez (United States) Jennifer Capriati	(United States) Chanda Rubin (South Africa) Amanda Coetzer (France) Amélie Mauresmo (Russia) Vera Zvonareva
17 Mar; 24 Mar	NASDAQ-100 Open; Key Biscayne, United States; Tier I event Hard – $2,960,000 – 96S/48Q/32D; Singles – Doubles	(United States) Serena Williams; 4–6, 6–4, 6–1	(United States) Jennifer Capriati	(Belgium) Kim Clijsters (United States) Chanda Rubin	(France) Marion Bartoli (Federal Republic of Yugoslavia) Jelena Dokić (Belgium) Justine Henin-Hardenne (United States) Meghann Shaughnessy
17 Mar; 24 Mar	NASDAQ-100 Open; Key Biscayne, United States; Tier I event Hard – $2,960,000 – 96S/48Q/32D; Singles – Doubles	(South Africa) Liezel Huber (Bulgaria) Magdalena Maleeva; 6–4, 3–6, 7–5	(Japan) Shinobu Asagoe (Japan) Nana Miyagi	(Belgium) Kim Clijsters (United States) Chanda Rubin	(France) Marion Bartoli (Federal Republic of Yugoslavia) Jelena Dokić (Belgium) Justine Henin-Hardenne (United States) Meghann Shaughnessy
31 Mar	Sarasota Clay Court Classic; Sarasota, United States; Tier IV event $140,000 – clay (green) – 32S/32Q/16D; Singles – Doubles	(Russia) Anastasia Myskina; 6–4, 6–1	(Australia) Alicia Molik	(Croatia) Iva Majoli (France) Nathalie Dechy	(Argentina) Paola Suárez (Argentina) Clarisa Fernández (United States) Ansley Cargill (Russia) Elena Dementieva
31 Mar	Sarasota Clay Court Classic; Sarasota, United States; Tier IV event $140,000 – clay (green) – 32S/32Q/16D; Singles – Doubles	(South Africa) Liezel Huber (United States) Martina Navratilova; 7–6(8), 6–3	(Japan) Shinobu Asagoe (Japan) Nana Miyagi	(Croatia) Iva Majoli (France) Nathalie Dechy	(Argentina) Paola Suárez (Argentina) Clarisa Fernández (United States) Ansley Cargill (Russia) Elena Dementieva
31 Mar	GP SAR de La Princesse Lalla Meryem; Casablanca, Morocco; Tier V event Clay – $110,000 – 32S/32Q/16D; Singles – Doubles	(Italy) Rita Grande; 6–2, 4–6, 6–1	(Italy) Antonella Serra Zanetti	(Slovakia) Ľudmila Cervanová (Spain) Marta Marrero	(Spain) Gala León García (Russia) Anastasia Rodionova (Slovakia) Henrieta Nagyová (Slovakia) Ľubomíra Kurhajcová
31 Mar	GP SAR de La Princesse Lalla Meryem; Casablanca, Morocco; Tier V event Clay – $110,000 – 32S/32Q/16D; Singles – Doubles	(Argentina) Gisela Dulko (Argentina) María Emilia Salerni; 6–3, 6–4	(Slovakia) Henrieta Nagyová (Ukraine) Elena Tatarkova	(Slovakia) Ľudmila Cervanová (Spain) Marta Marrero	(Spain) Gala León García (Russia) Anastasia Rodionova (Slovakia) Henrieta Nagyová (Slovakia) Ľubomíra Kurhajcová

=== April ===
Week	Tournament	Champions	Runners-up	Semifinalists	Quarterfinalists
7 Apr	Family Circle Cup; Charleston, United States; Tier I event $1,300,000 – clay (green) – 56S/32Q/28D; Singles – Doubles	(Belgium) Justine Henin-Hardenne; 6–3, 6–4	(United States) Serena Williams	(United States) Lindsay Davenport (United States) Ashley Harkleroad	(Federal Republic of Yugoslavia) Jelena Dokić (Russia) Vera Zvonareva (Slovakia) Daniela Hantuchová (France) Mary Pierce
7 Apr	Family Circle Cup; Charleston, United States; Tier I event $1,300,000 – clay (green) – 56S/32Q/28D; Singles – Doubles	(Spain) Virginia Ruano Pascual (Argentina) Paola Suárez; 6–0, 6–3	(Slovakia) Janette Husárová (Spain) Conchita Martínez	(United States) Lindsay Davenport (United States) Ashley Harkleroad	(Federal Republic of Yugoslavia) Jelena Dokić (Russia) Vera Zvonareva (Slovakia) Daniela Hantuchová (France) Mary Pierce
7 Apr	Estoril Open; Oeiras, Portugal; Tier IV event Clay – $140,000 – 32S/32Q/16D; Singles – Doubles	(Spain) Magüi Serna; 6–4, 6–1	(Germany) Julia Schruff	(Switzerland) Emmanuelle Gagliardi (France) Virginie Razzano	(Slovakia) Ľudmila Cervanová (Croatia) Silvija Talaja (Argentina) Gisela Dulko (France) Stéphanie Cohen-Aloro
7 Apr	Estoril Open; Oeiras, Portugal; Tier IV event Clay – $140,000 – 32S/32Q/16D; Singles – Doubles	(Hungary) Petra Mandula (Austria) Patricia Wartusch; 6–7^{(3–7)}, 7–6^{(7–3)}, 6–2	(Estonia) Maret Ani (Switzerland) Emmanuelle Gagliardi	(Switzerland) Emmanuelle Gagliardi (France) Virginie Razzano	(Slovakia) Ľudmila Cervanová (Croatia) Silvija Talaja (Argentina) Gisela Dulko (France) Stéphanie Cohen-Aloro
14 Apr	Bausch & Lomb Championships; Amelia Island, United States; Tier II event $585,000 – clay (green) – 56S/16Q/16D; Singles – Doubles	(Russia) Elena Dementieva; 4–6, 7–5, 6–3	(United States) Lindsay Davenport	(Belgium) Justine Henin-Hardenne (United States) Jennifer Capriati	(United States) Monica Seles (Slovakia) Daniela Hantuchová (United States) Lisa Raymond (Switzerland) Patty Schnyder
14 Apr	Bausch & Lomb Championships; Amelia Island, United States; Tier II event $585,000 – clay (green) – 56S/16Q/16D; Singles – Doubles	(United States) Lindsay Davenport (United States) Lisa Raymond; 7–5, 6–2	(Spain) Virginia Ruano Pascual (Argentina) Paola Suárez	(Belgium) Justine Henin-Hardenne (United States) Jennifer Capriati	(United States) Monica Seles (Slovakia) Daniela Hantuchová (United States) Lisa Raymond (Switzerland) Patty Schnyder
14 Apr	Tippmix Budapest Grand Prix; Budapest, Hungary; Tier V event Clay – $110,000 – 32S/32Q/16D; Singles – Doubles	(Spain) Magüi Serna; 3–6, 7–5, 6–4	(Australia) Alicia Molik	(Spain) María Sánchez Lorenzo (Slovakia) Ľudmila Cervanová	(Federal Republic of Yugoslavia) Jelena Janković (Slovakia) Jarmila Gajdošová (Czech Republic) Iveta Benešová (Hungary) Petra Mandula
14 Apr	Tippmix Budapest Grand Prix; Budapest, Hungary; Tier V event Clay – $110,000 – 32S/32Q/16D; Singles – Doubles	(Hungary) Petra Mandula (Ukraine) Elena Tatarkova; 6–3, 6–1	(Spain) Conchita Martínez Granados (Ukraine) Tatiana Perebiynis	(Spain) María Sánchez Lorenzo (Slovakia) Ľudmila Cervanová	(Federal Republic of Yugoslavia) Jelena Janković (Slovakia) Jarmila Gajdošová (Czech Republic) Iveta Benešová (Hungary) Petra Mandula
21 Apr	Fed Cup: First Round; Ettenheim, Germany, Clay; Bree, Belgium, Clay (i); Linköping, Sweden, Hard (i); Lowell, USA, Hard (i); Moscow, Russia, Carpet (i); Buenos Aires, Argentina, Clay; Andrézieux-Bouthéon, France, Clay (i); Tarragona, Spain, Clay	First round winners Slovakia 3–2; Belgium 5–0; Italy 3–2; United States 5–0; Russia 4–1; Slovenia 3–2; France 5–0; Spain 3–2	First round losers Germany; Austria; Sweden; Czech Republic; Croatia; Argentina; Colombia; Australia		
28 Apr	J&S Cup; Warsaw, Poland; Tier II event Clay – $700,000 – 28S/31Q/16D; Singles – Doubles	(France) Amélie Mauresmo; 6–7^{(6–8)}, 6–0, 3–0 ret.	(United States) Venus Williams	(Czech Republic) Denisa Chládková (Federal Republic of Yugoslavia) Jelena Dokić	(Italy) Francesca Schiavone (Colombia) Fabiola Zuluaga (Spain) Magüi Serna (Israel) Anna Pistolesi
28 Apr	J&S Cup; Warsaw, Poland; Tier II event Clay – $700,000 – 28S/31Q/16D; Singles – Doubles	(South Africa) Liezel Huber (Bulgaria) Magdalena Maleeva; 3–6, 6–4, 6–2	(Greece) Eleni Daniilidou (Italy) Francesca Schiavone	(Czech Republic) Denisa Chládková (Federal Republic of Yugoslavia) Jelena Dokić	(Italy) Francesca Schiavone (Colombia) Fabiola Zuluaga (Spain) Magüi Serna (Israel) Anna Pistolesi
28 Apr	Croatian Bol Ladies Open; Bol, Croatia; Tier III event Clay – $170,000 – 30S/32Q/16D; Singles – Doubles	(Russia) Vera Zvonareva; 6–1, 6–3	(Spain) Conchita Martínez Granados	(United States) Samantha Reeves (Spain) María Sánchez Lorenzo	(Spain) Gala León García (Slovakia) Ľudmila Cervanová (Italy) Tathiana Garbin (Croatia) Silvija Talaja
28 Apr	Croatian Bol Ladies Open; Bol, Croatia; Tier III event Clay – $170,000 – 30S/32Q/16D; Singles – Doubles	(Hungary) Petra Mandula (Austria) Patricia Wartusch; 6–3, 6–2	(Switzerland) Emmanuelle Gagliardi (Switzerland) Patty Schnyder	(United States) Samantha Reeves (Spain) María Sánchez Lorenzo	(Spain) Gala León García (Slovakia) Ľudmila Cervanová (Italy) Tathiana Garbin (Croatia) Silvija Talaja

=== May ===
Week	Tournament	Champions	Runners-up	Semifinalists	Quarterfinalists
5 May	MasterCard German Open; Berlin, Germany; Tier I event Clay – $1,224,000 – 56S/48Q/28D; Singles – Doubles	(Belgium) Justine Henin-Hardenne; 6–4, 4–6, 7–5	(Belgium) Kim Clijsters	(United States) Jennifer Capriati (France) Amélie Mauresmo	(Slovakia) Daniela Hantuchová (Russia) Elena Likhovtseva (Uzbekistan) Iroda Tulyaganova (Russia) Vera Zvonareva
5 May	MasterCard German Open; Berlin, Germany; Tier I event Clay – $1,224,000 – 56S/48Q/28D; Singles – Doubles	(Spain) Virginia Ruano Pascual (Argentina) Paola Suárez; 6–3, 4–6, 6–4	(Belgium) Kim Clijsters (Japan) Ai Sugiyama	(United States) Jennifer Capriati (France) Amélie Mauresmo	(Slovakia) Daniela Hantuchová (Russia) Elena Likhovtseva (Uzbekistan) Iroda Tulyaganova (Russia) Vera Zvonareva
12 May	Telecom Italia Masters; Rome, Italy; Tier I event Clay – $1,300,000 – 56S/48Q/28D; Singles – Doubles	(Belgium) Kim Clijsters; 3–6, 7–6^{(7–3)}, 6–0	(France) Amélie Mauresmo	(United States) Serena Williams (Japan) Ai Sugiyama	(Spain) Conchita Martínez (United States) Jennifer Capriati (Slovenia) Tina Pisnik (Russia) Anastasia Myskina
12 May	Telecom Italia Masters; Rome, Italy; Tier I event Clay – $1,300,000 – 56S/48Q/28D; Singles – Doubles	(Russia) Svetlana Kuznetsova (United States) Martina Navratilova; 6–4, 5–7, 6–2	(Federal Republic of Yugoslavia) Jelena Dokić (Russia) Nadia Petrova	(United States) Serena Williams (Japan) Ai Sugiyama	(Spain) Conchita Martínez (United States) Jennifer Capriati (Slovenia) Tina Pisnik (Russia) Anastasia Myskina
19 May	Internationaux de Strasbourg; Strasbourg, France; Tier III event Clay – $170,000 – 30S/32Q/16D; Singles – Doubles	(Italy) Silvia Farina Elia; 6–3, 4–6, 6–4	(Croatia) Karolina Šprem	(Russia) Vera Zvonareva (United States) Ashley Harkleroad	(Slovenia) Maja Matevžič (France) Marion Bartoli (France) Émilie Loit (Russia) Anastasia Myskina
19 May	Internationaux de Strasbourg; Strasbourg, France; Tier III event Clay – $170,000 – 30S/32Q/16D; Singles – Doubles	(Canada) Sonya Jeyaseelan (Slovenia) Maja Matevžič; 6–4, 6–4	(United States) Laura Granville (Croatia) Jelena Kostanić	(Russia) Vera Zvonareva (United States) Ashley Harkleroad	(Slovenia) Maja Matevžič (France) Marion Bartoli (France) Émilie Loit (Russia) Anastasia Myskina
19 May	Open de España; Madrid, Spain; Tier III event Clay – $170,000 – 30S/32Q/16D; Singles – Doubles	(United States) Chanda Rubin; 6–4, 5–7, 6–4	(Spain) María Sánchez Lorenzo	(Uzbekistan) Iroda Tulyaganova (Austria) Barbara Schett	(Argentina) Paola Suárez (Zimbabwe) Cara Black (Argentina) Clarisa Fernández (Switzerland) Emmanuelle Gagliardi
19 May	Open de España; Madrid, Spain; Tier III event Clay – $170,000 – 30S/32Q/16D; Singles – Doubles	(United States) Jill Craybas (South Africa) Liezel Huber; 6–4, 7–6^{(8–6)}	(Italy) Rita Grande (Indonesia) Angelique Widjaja	(Uzbekistan) Iroda Tulyaganova (Austria) Barbara Schett	(Argentina) Paola Suárez (Zimbabwe) Cara Black (Argentina) Clarisa Fernández (Switzerland) Emmanuelle Gagliardi
26 May; 2 Jun	French Open; Paris, France; Grand Slam; Clay – $5,363,011 – 128S/96Q/64D/32X; Singles – Doubles – Mixed doubles	(Belgium) Justine Henin-Hardenne; 6–0, 6–4	(Belgium) Kim Clijsters	(United States) Serena Williams (Russia) Nadia Petrova	(France) Amélie Mauresmo (United States) Chanda Rubin (Russia) Vera Zvonareva (Spain) Conchita Martínez
26 May; 2 Jun	French Open; Paris, France; Grand Slam; Clay – $5,363,011 – 128S/96Q/64D/32X; Singles – Doubles – Mixed doubles	(Belgium) Kim Clijsters (Japan) Ai Sugiyama; 6–7^{(5–7)}, 6–2, 9–7	(Spain) Virginia Ruano Pascual (Argentina) Paola Suárez	(United States) Serena Williams (Russia) Nadia Petrova	(France) Amélie Mauresmo (United States) Chanda Rubin (Russia) Vera Zvonareva (Spain) Conchita Martínez
26 May; 2 Jun	French Open; Paris, France; Grand Slam; Clay – $5,363,011 – 128S/96Q/64D/32X; Singles – Doubles – Mixed doubles	(United States) Mike Bryan (United States) Lisa Raymond; 6–3, 6–4	(India) Mahesh Bhupathi (Russia) Elena Likhovtseva	(United States) Serena Williams (Russia) Nadia Petrova	(France) Amélie Mauresmo (United States) Chanda Rubin (Russia) Vera Zvonareva (Spain) Conchita Martínez

=== June ===
Week	Tournament	Champions	Runners-up	Semifinalists	Quarterfinalists
9 Jun	DFS Classic; Birmingham, Great Britain; Tier III event Grass – $170,000 – 56S/32Q/16D; Singles – Doubles	(Bulgaria) Magdalena Maleeva; 6–1, 6–4	(Japan) Shinobu Asagoe	(Russia) Maria Sharapova (Greece) Eleni Daniilidou	(Russia) Elena Dementieva (Venezuela) María Vento-Kabchi (France) Stéphanie Foretz (Thailand) Tamarine Tanasugarn
9 Jun	DFS Classic; Birmingham, Great Britain; Tier III event Grass – $170,000 – 56S/32Q/16D; Singles – Doubles	(Belgium) Els Callens (United States) Meilen Tu; 7–5, 6–4	(Australia) Alicia Molik (United States) Martina Navratilova	(Russia) Maria Sharapova (Greece) Eleni Daniilidou	(Russia) Elena Dementieva (Venezuela) María Vento-Kabchi (France) Stéphanie Foretz (Thailand) Tamarine Tanasugarn
9 Jun	Wien Energie Grand Prix; Vienna, Austria; Tier III event Clay – $170,000 – 30S/32Q/16D; Singles – Doubles	(Argentina) Paola Suárez; 7–6(0), 2–6, 6–4	(Croatia) Karolina Šprem	(Germany) Anca Barna (Russia) Vera Zvonareva	(Federal Republic of Yugoslavia) Jelena Dokić (Italy) Silvia Farina Elia (Czech Republic) Denisa Chládková (Slovenia) Maja Matevžič
9 Jun	Wien Energie Grand Prix; Vienna, Austria; Tier III event Clay – $170,000 – 30S/32Q/16D; Singles – Doubles	(China) Li Ting (China) Sun Tiantian; 6–3, 6–4	(China) Yan Zi (China) Zheng Jie	(Germany) Anca Barna (Russia) Vera Zvonareva	(Federal Republic of Yugoslavia) Jelena Dokić (Italy) Silvia Farina Elia (Czech Republic) Denisa Chládková (Slovenia) Maja Matevžič
16 Jun	Hastings Direct Int'l Champ's; Eastbourne, Great Britain; Tier II event Grass – $585,000 – 28S/32Q/16D; Singles – Doubles	(United States) Chanda Rubin; 6–4, 3–6, 6–4	(Spain) Conchita Martínez	(Italy) Silvia Farina Elia (United States) Jennifer Capriati	(Bulgaria) Magdalena Maleeva (Slovakia) Daniela Hantuchová (France) Nathalie Dechy (Israel) Anna Pistolesi
16 Jun	Hastings Direct Int'l Champ's; Eastbourne, Great Britain; Tier II event Grass – $585,000 – 28S/32Q/16D; Singles – Doubles	(United States) Lindsay Davenport (United States) Lisa Raymond; 6–3, 6–2	(United States) Jennifer Capriati (Spain) Magüi Serna	(Italy) Silvia Farina Elia (United States) Jennifer Capriati	(Bulgaria) Magdalena Maleeva (Slovakia) Daniela Hantuchová (France) Nathalie Dechy (Israel) Anna Pistolesi
16 Jun	Ordina Open 's-Hertogenbosch, Netherlands; Tier III event Grass – $170,000 – 30S/16D; Singles – Doubles	(Belgium) Kim Clijsters; 6–7^{(4–7)}, 3–0 ret.	(Belgium) Justine Henin-Hardenne	(Germany) Barbara Rittner (Russia) Nadia Petrova	(Slovenia) Tina Pisnik (Uzbekistan) Iroda Tulyaganova (Russia) Elena Dementieva (Slovakia) Ľudmila Cervanová
16 Jun	Ordina Open 's-Hertogenbosch, Netherlands; Tier III event Grass – $170,000 – 30S/16D; Singles – Doubles	(Russia) Elena Dementieva (Russia) Lina Krasnoroutskaya; 2–6, 6–3, 6–4	(Russia) Nadia Petrova (France) Mary Pierce	(Germany) Barbara Rittner (Russia) Nadia Petrova	(Slovenia) Tina Pisnik (Uzbekistan) Iroda Tulyaganova (Russia) Elena Dementieva (Slovakia) Ľudmila Cervanová
23 Jun; 30 Jun	Wimbledon Championships; London, Great Britain; Grand Slam; Grass – $5,182,419 – 128S/96Q/64D/32X; Singles – Doubles – Mixed doubles	(United States) Serena Williams; 4–6, 6–4, 6–2	(United States) Venus Williams	(Belgium) Justine Henin-Hardenne (Belgium) Kim Clijsters	(United States) Jennifer Capriati (Russia) Svetlana Kuznetsova (United States) Lindsay Davenport (Italy) Silvia Farina Elia
23 Jun; 30 Jun	Wimbledon Championships; London, Great Britain; Grand Slam; Grass – $5,182,419 – 128S/96Q/64D/32X; Singles – Doubles – Mixed doubles	(Belgium) Kim Clijsters (Japan) Ai Sugiyama; 6–4, 6–4	(Spain) Virginia Ruano Pascual (Argentina) Paola Suárez	(Belgium) Justine Henin-Hardenne (Belgium) Kim Clijsters	(United States) Jennifer Capriati (Russia) Svetlana Kuznetsova (United States) Lindsay Davenport (Italy) Silvia Farina Elia
23 Jun; 30 Jun	Wimbledon Championships; London, Great Britain; Grand Slam; Grass – $5,182,419 – 128S/96Q/64D/32X; Singles – Doubles – Mixed doubles	(India) Leander Paes (United States) Martina Navratilova; 6–3, 6–3	(Israel) Andy Ram (Russia) Anastasia Rodionova	(Belgium) Justine Henin-Hardenne (Belgium) Kim Clijsters	(United States) Jennifer Capriati (Russia) Svetlana Kuznetsova (United States) Lindsay Davenport (Italy) Silvia Farina Elia

=== July ===
Week	Tournament	Champions	Runners-up	Semifinalists	Quarterfinalists
7 Jul	Internazionali Femminili di Palermo; Palermo, Italy; Tier V event Clay – $110,000 – 32S/30Q/16D; Singles – Doubles	(Russia) Dinara Safina; 6–3, 6–4	(Slovenia) Katarina Srebotnik	(Slovakia) Ľudmila Cervanová (Spain) Anabel Medina Garrigues	(Slovakia) Henrieta Nagyová (Italy) Francesca Schiavone (Ukraine) Yuliana Fedak (France) Virginie Razzano
7 Jul	Internazionali Femminili di Palermo; Palermo, Italy; Tier V event Clay – $110,000 – 32S/30Q/16D; Singles – Doubles	(Italy) Adriana Serra Zanetti (Italy) Emily Stellato; 6–4, 6–2	(Spain) María José Martínez Sánchez (Spain) Arantxa Parra Santonja	(Slovakia) Ľudmila Cervanová (Spain) Anabel Medina Garrigues	(Slovakia) Henrieta Nagyová (Italy) Francesca Schiavone (Ukraine) Yuliana Fedak (France) Virginie Razzano
14 Jul	Fed Cup: Quarterfinals; Charleroi, Belgium, Hard (i); Washington, D.C., USA, Hard; Portorož, Slovenia, Clay; Oviedo, Spain, Clay	Quarterfinal winners Belgium 5–0; United States 5–0; Russia 5–0; France 4–1	Quarterfinal losers Slovakia; Italy; Slovenia; Spain		
21 Jul	Bank of the West Classic; Stanford, United States; Tier II event Hard – $635,000 – 28S/32Q/16D; Singles – Doubles	(Belgium) Kim Clijsters; 4–6, 6–4, 6–2	(United States) Jennifer Capriati	(Venezuela) María Vento-Kabchi (Italy) Francesca Schiavone	(United States) Lisa Raymond (Federal Republic of Yugoslavia) Jelena Dokić (United States) Amy Frazier (Switzerland) Marie-Gayanay Mikaelian
21 Jul	Bank of the West Classic; Stanford, United States; Tier II event Hard – $635,000 – 28S/32Q/16D; Singles – Doubles	(Zimbabwe) Cara Black (United States) Lisa Raymond; 7–6^{(7–5)}, 6–1	(South Korea) Cho Yoon-jeong (Italy) Francesca Schiavone	(Venezuela) María Vento-Kabchi (Italy) Francesca Schiavone	(United States) Lisa Raymond (Federal Republic of Yugoslavia) Jelena Dokić (United States) Amy Frazier (Switzerland) Marie-Gayanay Mikaelian
28 Jul	Acura Classic; San Diego, United States; Tier II event Hard – $1,000,000 – 56S/16Q/16D; Singles – Doubles	(Belgium) Justine Henin-Hardenne; 3–6, 6–2, 6–3	(Belgium) Kim Clijsters	(Russia) Svetlana Kuznetsova (United States) Lindsay Davenport	(Russia) Elena Likhovtseva (Russia) Nadia Petrova (United States) Chanda Rubin (United States) Lisa Raymond
28 Jul	Acura Classic; San Diego, United States; Tier II event Hard – $1,000,000 – 56S/16Q/16D; Singles – Doubles	(Belgium) Kim Clijsters (Japan) Ai Sugiyama; 6–4, 7–5	(United States) Lindsay Davenport (United States) Lisa Raymond	(Russia) Svetlana Kuznetsova (United States) Lindsay Davenport	(Russia) Elena Likhovtseva (Russia) Nadia Petrova (United States) Chanda Rubin (United States) Lisa Raymond
28 Jul	Idea Prokom Open; Sopot, Poland; Tier III event Clay – $300,000 – 30S/32Q/16D; Singles – Doubles	(Israel) Anna Pistolesi; 6–2, 6–0	(Czech Republic) Klára Koukalová	(Hungary) Petra Mandula (Switzerland) Patty Schnyder	(Russia) Anastasia Myskina (Croatia) Jelena Kostanić (Russia) Dinara Safina (Slovenia) Maja Matevžič
28 Jul	Idea Prokom Open; Sopot, Poland; Tier III event Clay – $300,000 – 30S/32Q/16D; Singles – Doubles	(Ukraine) Tatiana Perebiynis (Croatia) Silvija Talaja; 6–4, 6–2	(Estonia) Maret Ani (Czech Republic) Libuše Prusová	(Hungary) Petra Mandula (Switzerland) Patty Schnyder	(Russia) Anastasia Myskina (Croatia) Jelena Kostanić (Russia) Dinara Safina (Slovenia) Maja Matevžič

=== August ===
Week	Tournament	Champions	Runners-up	Semifinalists	Quarterfinalists
4 Aug	JPMorgan Chase Open; Carson, United States; Tier II event Hard – $635,000 – 56S/16Q/16D; Singles – Doubles	(Belgium) Kim Clijsters; 6–1, 3–6, 6–1	(United States) Lindsay Davenport	(Italy) Francesca Schiavone (Japan) Ai Sugiyama	(Russia) Svetlana Kuznetsova (Australia) Nicole Pratt (Bulgaria) Magdalena Maleeva (South Africa) Amanda Coetzer
4 Aug	JPMorgan Chase Open; Carson, United States; Tier II event Hard – $635,000 – 56S/16Q/16D; Singles – Doubles	(France) Mary Pierce (Australia) Rennae Stubbs; 6–3, 6–3	(Russia) Elena Bovina (Belgium) Els Callens	(Italy) Francesca Schiavone (Japan) Ai Sugiyama	(Russia) Svetlana Kuznetsova (Australia) Nicole Pratt (Bulgaria) Magdalena Maleeva (South Africa) Amanda Coetzer
4 Aug	Nordea Nordic Light Open; Espoo, Finland; Tier IV event Hard – $140,000 – 32S/32Q/16D; Singles – Doubles	(Israel) Anna Pistolesi; 4–6, 6–4, 6–0	(Croatia) Jelena Kostanić	(Russia) Vera Douchevina (Croatia) Karolina Šprem	(Croatia) Silvija Talaja (Hungary) Melinda Czink (Hungary) Petra Mandula (Slovakia) Ľudmila Cervanová
4 Aug	Nordea Nordic Light Open; Espoo, Finland; Tier IV event Hard – $140,000 – 32S/32Q/16D; Singles – Doubles	(Russia) Evgenia Kulikovskaya (Ukraine) Elena Tatarkova; 6–2, 6–4	(Ukraine) Tatiana Perebiynis (Croatia) Silvija Talaja	(Russia) Vera Douchevina (Croatia) Karolina Šprem	(Croatia) Silvija Talaja (Hungary) Melinda Czink (Hungary) Petra Mandula (Slovakia) Ľudmila Cervanová
11 Aug	Rogers AT&T Cup; Toronto, Canada; Tier I event Hard – $1,325,000 – 56S/32Q/28D; Singles – Doubles	(Belgium) Justine Henin-Hardenne; 6–1, 6–0	(Russia) Lina Krasnoroutskaya	(Argentina) Paola Suárez (Russia) Elena Dementieva	(Slovenia) Katarina Srebotnik (Russia) Vera Zvonareva (France) Amélie Mauresmo (Russia) Elena Bovina
11 Aug	Rogers AT&T Cup; Toronto, Canada; Tier I event Hard – $1,325,000 – 56S/32Q/28D; Singles – Doubles	(Russia) Svetlana Kuznetsova (United States) Martina Navratilova; 3–6, 6–1, 6–1	(Venezuela) María Vento-Kabchi (Indonesia) Angelique Widjaja	(Argentina) Paola Suárez (Russia) Elena Dementieva	(Slovenia) Katarina Srebotnik (Russia) Vera Zvonareva (France) Amélie Mauresmo (Russia) Elena Bovina
18 Aug	Pilot Pen Tennis; New Haven, United States; Tier II event Hard – $625,000 – 28S/32Q/16D; Singles – Doubles	(United States) Jennifer Capriati; 6–2, 4–0 ret.	(United States) Lindsay Davenport	(Russia) Elena Dementieva (France) Amélie Mauresmo	(Spain) Magüi Serna (Zimbabwe) Cara Black (Israel) Anna Pistolesi (Japan) Ai Sugiyama
18 Aug	Pilot Pen Tennis; New Haven, United States; Tier II event Hard – $625,000 – 28S/32Q/16D; Singles – Doubles	(Spain) Virginia Ruano Pascual (Argentina) Paola Suárez; 7–6^{(8–6)}, 6–3	(Australia) Alicia Molik (Spain) Magüi Serna	(Russia) Elena Dementieva (France) Amélie Mauresmo	(Spain) Magüi Serna (Zimbabwe) Cara Black (Israel) Anna Pistolesi (Japan) Ai Sugiyama
25 Aug; 1 Sep	U.S. Open; New York City, United States; Grand Slam; Hard – $6,682,980 – 128S/96Q/64D/32X; Singles – Doubles – Mixed doubles	(Belgium) Justine Henin-Hardenne; 7–5, 6–1	(Belgium) Kim Clijsters	(United States) Lindsay Davenport (United States) Jennifer Capriati	(France) Amélie Mauresmo (Argentina) Paola Suárez (Italy) Francesca Schiavone (Russia) Anastasia Myskina
25 Aug; 1 Sep	U.S. Open; New York City, United States; Grand Slam; Hard – $6,682,980 – 128S/96Q/64D/32X; Singles – Doubles – Mixed doubles	(Spain) Virginia Ruano Pascual (Argentina) Paola Suárez; 6–2, 6–3	(Russia) Svetlana Kuznetsova (United States) Martina Navratilova	(United States) Lindsay Davenport (United States) Jennifer Capriati	(France) Amélie Mauresmo (Argentina) Paola Suárez (Italy) Francesca Schiavone (Russia) Anastasia Myskina
25 Aug; 1 Sep	U.S. Open; New York City, United States; Grand Slam; Hard – $6,682,980 – 128S/96Q/64D/32X; Singles – Doubles – Mixed doubles	(United States) Bob Bryan (Slovenia) Katarina Srebotnik; 5–7, 7–5, 7–6	(Canada) Daniel Nestor (Russia) Lina Krasnoroutskaya	(United States) Lindsay Davenport (United States) Jennifer Capriati	(France) Amélie Mauresmo (Argentina) Paola Suárez (Italy) Francesca Schiavone (Russia) Anastasia Myskina

=== September ===
Week	Tournament	Champions	Runners-up	Semifinalists	Quarterfinalists
8 Sep	Wismilak International; Bali, Indonesia; Tier III event Hard – $225,000 – 30S/24Q/16D; Singles – Doubles	(Russia) Elena Dementieva; 6–2, 6–1	(United States) Chanda Rubin	(Japan) Saori Obata (Venezuela) María Vento-Kabchi	(Germany) Anca Barna (Indonesia) Angelique Widjaja (Switzerland) Emmanuelle Gagliardi (Thailand) Tamarine Tanasugarn
8 Sep	Wismilak International; Bali, Indonesia; Tier III event Hard – $225,000 – 30S/24Q/16D; Singles – Doubles	(Venezuela) María Vento-Kabchi (Indonesia) Angelique Widjaja; 7–5, 6–2	(France) Émilie Loit (Australia) Nicole Pratt	(Japan) Saori Obata (Venezuela) María Vento-Kabchi	(Germany) Anca Barna (Indonesia) Angelique Widjaja (Switzerland) Emmanuelle Gagliardi (Thailand) Tamarine Tanasugarn
15 Sep	Polo Open; Shanghai, China; Tier II event Hard – $585,000 – 28S/32Q/16D; Singles – Doubles	(Russia) Elena Dementieva; 6–3, 7–6^{(8–6)}	(United States) Chanda Rubin	(Japan) Ai Sugiyama (Japan) Akiko Morigami	(Russia) Maria Sharapova (Russia) Dinara Safina (Australia) Alicia Molik (Germany) Anca Barna
15 Sep	Polo Open; Shanghai, China; Tier II event Hard – $585,000 – 28S/32Q/16D; Singles – Doubles	(France) Émilie Loit (Australia) Nicole Pratt; 6–3, 6–3	(Japan) Ai Sugiyama (Thailand) Tamarine Tanasugarn	(Japan) Ai Sugiyama (Japan) Akiko Morigami	(Russia) Maria Sharapova (Russia) Dinara Safina (Australia) Alicia Molik (Germany) Anca Barna
22 Sep	Sparkassen Cup; Leipzig, Germany; Tier II event Hard (i) – $585,000 – 28S/32Q/16D; Singles – Doubles	(Russia) Anastasia Myskina; 3–6, 6–3, 6–3	(Belgium) Justine Henin-Hardenne	(Belgium) Kim Clijsters (Venezuela) María Vento-Kabchi	(Switzerland) Patty Schnyder (Russia) Nadia Petrova (Czech Republic) Sandra Kleinová (Belgium) Els Callens
22 Sep	Sparkassen Cup; Leipzig, Germany; Tier II event Hard (i) – $585,000 – 28S/32Q/16D; Singles – Doubles	(Russia) Svetlana Kuznetsova (United States) Martina Navratilova; 3–6, 6–1, 6–3	(Russia) Elena Likhovtseva (Russia) Nadia Petrova	(Belgium) Kim Clijsters (Venezuela) María Vento-Kabchi	(Switzerland) Patty Schnyder (Russia) Nadia Petrova (Czech Republic) Sandra Kleinová (Belgium) Els Callens
29 Sep	Ladies Kremlin Cup; Moscow, Russia; Tier I event Carpet (i) – $1,300,000 – 28S/32Q/16D; Singles – Doubles	(Russia) Anastasia Myskina; 6–2, 6–4	(France) Amélie Mauresmo	(Israel) Anna Pistolesi (Russia) Elena Dementieva	(Russia) Elena Bovina (Greece) Eleni Daniilidou (Italy) Francesca Schiavone (Russia) Vera Zvonareva
29 Sep	Ladies Kremlin Cup; Moscow, Russia; Tier I event Carpet (i) – $1,300,000 – 28S/32Q/16D; Singles – Doubles	(Russia) Nadia Petrova (United States) Meghann Shaughnessy; 6–3, 6–4	(Russia) Anastasia Myskina (Russia) Vera Zvonareva	(Israel) Anna Pistolesi (Russia) Elena Dementieva	(Russia) Elena Bovina (Greece) Eleni Daniilidou (Italy) Francesca Schiavone (Russia) Vera Zvonareva
29 Sep	AIG Japan Open; Tokyo, Japan; Tier III event Hard – $170,000 – 30S/32Q/16D; Singles – Doubles	(Russia) Maria Sharapova; 2–6, 6–2, 7–6^{(7–5)}	(Hungary) Anikó Kapros	(Spain) Arantxa Parra Santonja (China) Zheng Jie	(Japan) Ai Sugiyama (United States) Jill Craybas (Luxembourg) Claudine Schaul (China) Yan Zi
29 Sep	AIG Japan Open; Tokyo, Japan; Tier III event Hard – $170,000 – 30S/32Q/16D; Singles – Doubles	(Russia) Maria Sharapova (Thailand) Tamarine Tanasugarn; 7–6^{(7–1)}, 6–0	(United States) Ansley Cargill (United States) Ashley Harkleroad	(Spain) Arantxa Parra Santonja (China) Zheng Jie	(Japan) Ai Sugiyama (United States) Jill Craybas (Luxembourg) Claudine Schaul (China) Yan Zi

=== October ===
Week	Tournament	Champions	Runners-up	Semifinalists	Quarterfinalists
6 Oct	Porsche Tennis Grand Prix; Filderstadt, Germany; Tier II event Hard (i) – $650,000 – 28S/32Q/16D; Singles – Doubles	(Belgium) Kim Clijsters; 5–7, 6–4, 6–2	(Belgium) Justine Henin-Hardenne	(France) Mary Pierce (Russia) Elena Bovina	(France) Amélie Mauresmo (Bulgaria) Magdalena Maleeva (United States) Lindsay Davenport (Russia) Elena Dementieva
6 Oct	Porsche Tennis Grand Prix; Filderstadt, Germany; Tier II event Hard (i) – $650,000 – 28S/32Q/16D; Singles – Doubles	(United States) Lisa Raymond (Australia) Rennae Stubbs; 6–2, 6–4	(Zimbabwe) Cara Black (United States) Martina Navratilova	(France) Mary Pierce (Russia) Elena Bovina	(France) Amélie Mauresmo (Bulgaria) Magdalena Maleeva (United States) Lindsay Davenport (Russia) Elena Dementieva
6 Oct	Tashkent Open; Tashkent, Uzbekistan; Tier IV event Hard – $140,000 – 32S/32Q/16D; Singles – Doubles	(Spain) Virginia Ruano Pascual; 6–2, 7–6^{(7–2)}	(Japan) Saori Obata	(Spain) Arantxa Parra Santonja (Switzerland) Emmanuelle Gagliardi	(Russia) Lioudmila Skavronskaia (United States) Jill Craybas (Croatia) Jelena Kostanić (Italy) Adriana Serra Zanetti
6 Oct	Tashkent Open; Tashkent, Uzbekistan; Tier IV event Hard – $140,000 – 32S/32Q/16D; Singles – Doubles	(Ukraine) Yuliya Beygelzimer (Belarus) Tatiana Poutchek; 6–3, 7–6^{(7–0)}	(China) Li Ting (China) Sun Tiantian	(Spain) Arantxa Parra Santonja (Switzerland) Emmanuelle Gagliardi	(Russia) Lioudmila Skavronskaia (United States) Jill Craybas (Croatia) Jelena Kostanić (Italy) Adriana Serra Zanetti
13 Oct	Swisscom Challenge; Zürich, Switzerland; Tier I event Hard (i) – $1,300,000 – 28S/32Q/16D; Singles – Doubles	(Belgium) Justine Henin-Hardenne; 6–0, 6–4	(Federal Republic of Yugoslavia) Jelena Dokić	(Belgium) Kim Clijsters (Russia) Nadia Petrova	(Slovenia) Tina Pisnik (Switzerland) Patty Schnyder (Russia) Elena Bovina (Russia) Vera Zvonareva
13 Oct	Swisscom Challenge; Zürich, Switzerland; Tier I event Hard (i) – $1,300,000 – 28S/32Q/16D; Singles – Doubles	(Belgium) Kim Clijsters (Japan) Ai Sugiyama; 7–6^{(7–3)}, 6–2	(Spain) Virginia Ruano Pascual (Argentina) Paola Suárez	(Belgium) Kim Clijsters (Russia) Nadia Petrova	(Slovenia) Tina Pisnik (Switzerland) Patty Schnyder (Russia) Elena Bovina (Russia) Vera Zvonareva
20 Oct	Generali Ladies Linz; Linz, Austria; Tier II event Hard (i) – $585,000 – 28S/32Q/16D; Singles – Doubles	(Japan) Ai Sugiyama; 7–5, 6–4	(Russia) Nadia Petrova	(Switzerland) Patty Schnyder (Russia) Vera Zvonareva	(Russia) Anastasia Myskina (Argentina) Paola Suárez (Israel) Anna Pistolesi (Federal Republic of Yugoslavia) Jelena Dokić
20 Oct	Generali Ladies Linz; Linz, Austria; Tier II event Hard (i) – $585,000 – 28S/32Q/16D; Singles – Doubles	(South Africa) Liezel Huber (Japan) Ai Sugiyama; 6–1, 7–6^{(8–6)}	(France) Marion Bartoli (Italy) Silvia Farina Elia	(Switzerland) Patty Schnyder (Russia) Vera Zvonareva	(Russia) Anastasia Myskina (Argentina) Paola Suárez (Israel) Anna Pistolesi (Federal Republic of Yugoslavia) Jelena Dokić
20 Oct	SEAT Open; Kockelscheuer, Luxembourg; Tier III event Hard (i) – $225,000 – 30S/28Q/16D; Singles – Doubles	(Belgium) Kim Clijsters; 6–2, 7–5	(United States) Chanda Rubin	(Russia) Maria Sharapova (Germany) Marlene Weingärtner	(France) Émilie Loit (Germany) Anca Barna (Greece) Eleni Daniilidou (Australia) Alicia Molik
20 Oct	SEAT Open; Kockelscheuer, Luxembourg; Tier III event Hard (i) – $225,000 – 30S/28Q/16D; Singles – Doubles	(Russia) Maria Sharapova (Thailand) Tamarine Tanasugarn; 6–1, 6–4	(Ukraine) Elena Tatarkova (Germany) Marlene Weingärtner	(Russia) Maria Sharapova (Germany) Marlene Weingärtner	(France) Émilie Loit (Germany) Anca Barna (Greece) Eleni Daniilidou (Australia) Alicia Molik
27 Oct	Advanta Championships of Philadelphia; Philadelphia, United States; Tier II event Hard (i) – $585,000 – 28S/32Q/16D; Singles – Doubles	(France) Amélie Mauresmo; 5–7, 6–0, 6–2	(Russia) Anastasia Myskina	(Russia) Nadia Petrova (Japan) Ai Sugiyama	(Germany) Marlene Weingärtner (United States) Chanda Rubin (United States) Meghann Shaughnessy (United States) Lisa Raymond
27 Oct	Advanta Championships of Philadelphia; Philadelphia, United States; Tier II event Hard (i) – $585,000 – 28S/32Q/16D; Singles – Doubles	(United States) Martina Navratilova (United States) Lisa Raymond; 6–3, 6–4	(Zimbabwe) Cara Black (Australia) Rennae Stubbs	(Russia) Nadia Petrova (Japan) Ai Sugiyama	(Germany) Marlene Weingärtner (United States) Chanda Rubin (United States) Meghann Shaughnessy (United States) Lisa Raymond
27 Oct	Challenge Bell; Quebec City, Canada; Tier III event Carpet (i) – $170,000 – 30S/32Q/16D; Singles – Doubles	(Russia) Maria Sharapova; 6–2 ret.	(Venezuela) Milagros Sequera	(France) Mary Pierce (United States) Laura Granville	(Slovakia) Ľubomíra Kurhajcová (France) Marion Bartoli (China) Zheng Jie (Russia) Alina Jidkova
27 Oct	Challenge Bell; Quebec City, Canada; Tier III event Carpet (i) – $170,000 – 30S/32Q/16D; Singles – Doubles	(China) Li Ting (China) Sun Tiantian; 6–3, 6–3	(Belgium) Els Callens (United States) Meilen Tu	(France) Mary Pierce (United States) Laura Granville	(Slovakia) Ľubomíra Kurhajcová (France) Marion Bartoli (China) Zheng Jie (Russia) Alina Jidkova

=== November ===
Week	Tournament	Champions	Runners-up	Semifinalists	Quarterfinalists
3 Nov	WTA Tour Championships; Los Angeles, United States; Year-end Championship; Hard – $3,000,000 – 8S (round robin)/4D; Singles – Doubles	(Belgium) Kim Clijsters; 6–2, 6–0	(France) Amélie Mauresmo	(United States) Jennifer Capriati (Belgium) Justine Henin-Hardenne	(United States) Chanda Rubin (Russia) Elena Dementieva (Russia) Anastasia Myskina (Japan) Ai Sugiyama
3 Nov	WTA Tour Championships; Los Angeles, United States; Year-end Championship; Hard – $3,000,000 – 8S (round robin)/4D; Singles – Doubles	(Spain) Virginia Ruano Pascual (Argentina) Paola Suárez; 6–4, 3–6, 6–3	(Belgium) Kim Clijsters (Japan) Ai Sugiyama	(United States) Jennifer Capriati (Belgium) Justine Henin-Hardenne	(United States) Chanda Rubin (Russia) Elena Dementieva (Russia) Anastasia Myskina (Japan) Ai Sugiyama
3 Nov	Volvo Women's Open; Pattaya, Thailand; Tier V event Hard – $110,000 – 32S/28Q/16D; Singles – Doubles	(Slovakia) Henrieta Nagyová; 6–4, 6–2	(Slovakia) Ľubomíra Kurhajcová	(Thailand) Tamarine Tanasugarn (Germany) Anca Barna	(Russia) Anastasia Rodionova (Ukraine) Elena Tatarkova (Croatia) Jelena Kostanić (Japan) Saori Obata
3 Nov	Volvo Women's Open; Pattaya, Thailand; Tier V event Hard – $110,000 – 32S/28Q/16D; Singles – Doubles	(China) Li Ting (China) Sun Tiantian; 6–4, 6–3	(Indonesia) Wynne Prakusya (Indonesia) Angelique Widjaja	(Thailand) Tamarine Tanasugarn (Germany) Anca Barna	(Russia) Anastasia Rodionova (Ukraine) Elena Tatarkova (Croatia) Jelena Kostanić (Japan) Saori Obata
14 Nov	Fed Cup: Final; Moscow, Russia, Carpet (i)	France; 4–1	United States	Belgium 1–4; Russia 2–3	

== Rankings ==
Below are the 2003 WTA year-end rankings:

No	Player Name	Nation	Points	2002	Change
1	Justine Henin-Hardenne	BEL	6,628	5	+4
2	Kim Clijsters	BEL	6,553	4	+2
3	Serena Williams	USA	3,916	1	-2
4	Amélie Mauresmo	FRA	3,194	6	+2
5	Lindsay Davenport	USA	2,990	12	+7
6	Jennifer Capriati	USA	2,766	3	-3
7	Anastasia Myskina	RUS	2,581	11	+4
8	Elena Dementieva	RUS	2,383	19	+11
9	Chanda Rubin	USA	2,328	13	+4
10	Ai Sugiyama	JPN	2,235	24	+14
11	Venus Williams	USA	2,211	2	-9
12	Nadia Petrova	RUS	1,994	111	+99
13	Vera Zvonareva	RUS	1,808	45	+32
14	Paola Suárez	ARG	1,526	27	+13
15	Jelena Dokić	YUG	1,405	9	-6
16	Anna Pistolesi	ISR	1,353	16	=
17	Meghann Shaughnessy	USA	1,350	30	+13
18	Conchita Martínez	ESP	1,316	34	+16
19	Daniela Hantuchová	SVK	1,271	8	-11
20	Francesca Schiavone	ITA	1,265	41	+21

=== Number 1 ranking ===
Holder	Date gained	Date forfeited
Serena Williams (USA)	Year-End 2002	10 August 2003
Kim Clijsters (BEL)	11 August 2003	19 October 2003
Justine Henin-Hardenne (BEL)	20 October 2003	26 October 2003
Kim Clijsters (BEL)	27 October 2003	9 November 2003
Justine Henin-Hardenne (BEL)	10 November 2003	Year-End 2003

=== Points distribution ===
Category	W	F	SF	QF	R16	R32	R64	R128	Q	Q3	Q2	Q1
Grand Slam (S)	650	456	292	162	90	56	32	2	26	21	12.5	2
Grand Slam (D)	650	456	292	162	90	56	2	–	22	–	–	–
WTA Championships (S)	485	340	218	121	67	–	–	–	–	–	–	–
WTA Championships (D)	485	340	218	121	–	–	–	–	–	–	–	–
Tier I $2,000,000 (S)	325	228	146	81	45	28	16	1	11	–	6.25	1
Tier I $2,000,000 (D)	325	228	146	81	45	1	–	–	20	–	–	–
Tier I $1,325,000 (56S)	300	210	135	75	42	25	1	–	10.5	–	5.75	1
Tier I $1,325,000 (28D)	300	210	135	75	42	1	–	–	18.5	–	–	–
Tier I $1,224,000 (56S)	275	193	124	69	38	23	1	–	9.5	–	5.25	1
Tier I $1,224,000 (28S)	275	193	124	69	38	1	–	–	17	9.5	5.25	1
Tier I $1,224,000 (28D)	275	193	124	69	38	1	–	–	17	–	–	–
Tier I $1,224,000 (16D)	275	193	124	69	1	–	–	–	17	–	–	–
Tier II $650,000 (56S)	220	154	99	55	29	15	1	–	7.75	–	4.5	1
Tier II $650,000 (28S)	220	154	99	55	29	1	–	–	13.25	7.75	4.5	1
Tier II $650,000 (16D)	220	154	99	55	1	–	–	–	13	–	–	–
Tier II $585,000 (56S)	195	137	88	49	25	14	1	–	6.75	–	4	1
Tier II $585,000 (28S)	195	137	88	49	25	1	–	–	11.75	6.75	4	1
Tier II $585,000 (16D)	195	137	88	49	1	–	–	–	11.75	–	–	–
Tier III $225,000 (30S)	145	103	66	37	19	1	–	–	4.5	–	2.75	1
Tier III $225,000 (16D)	145	103	66	37	1	–	–	–	–	–	–	–
Tier III $170,000 (56S)	120	85	55	30	16	9	1	–	3.75	–	2.25	1
Tier III $170,000 (30S)	120	85	55	30	16	1	–	–	7.25	3.75	2.25	1
Tier III $170,000 (16D)	120	85	55	30	1	–	–	–	7.5	–	–	–
Tier IV $140,000 (S)	95	67	43	24	12	1	–	–	5.5	3.5	2	1
Tier IV $140,000 (D)	95	67	43	24	1	–	–	–	6.25	–	–	–
Tier V $110,000 (S)	80	56	36	20	10	1	–	–	4.5	3	2	1
Tier V $110,000 (D)	80	56	36	20	1	–	–	–	5	–	–	–

== Statistics ==
List of players and titles won, last name alphabetically:

- (Belgium) Kim Clijsters – Sydney, Indian Wells, Rome, 's-Hertogenbosch, Stanford, Los Angeles, Filderstadt, Luxembourg and WTA Tour Championships (9)
- (Belgium) Justine Henin-Hardenne – Dubai, Charleston, Berlin, French Open, San Diego, Toronto, U.S. Open and Zurich (8)
- (Russia) Anastasia Myskina – Doha, Sarasota, Leipzig and Moscow (4)
- (United States) Serena Williams – Australian Open, Paris, Miami and Wimbledon (4)
- (Russia) Elena Dementieva – Amelia Island, Bali and Shanghai (3)
- (France) Amélie Mauresmo – Warsaw and Philadelphia (2)
- (United States) Chanda Rubin – Madrid and Eastbourne (2)
- (Spain) Magüi Serna – Estoril and Budapest (2)
- (Russia) Maria Sharapova – Tokyo Japan Open and Quebec City (2)
- (Israel) Anna Pistolesi – Sopot and Helsinki (2)
- (Japan) Ai Sugiyama – Scottsdale and Linz (2)
- (United States) Jennifer Capriati – New Haven (1)
- (South Africa) Amanda Coetzer – Acapulco (1)
- (Greece) Eleni Daniilidou – Auckland (1)
- (United States) Lindsay Davenport – Tokyo Pan Pacific (1)
- (France) Nathalie Dechy – Gold Coast (1)
- (Italy) Silvia Farina Elia – Strasbourg (1)
- (Italy) Rita Grande – Casablanca (1)
- (Bulgaria) Magdalena Maleeva – Birmingham (1)
- (Australia) Alicia Molik – Hobart (1)
- (Slovakia) Henrieta Nagyová – Pattaya City (1)
- (United States) Lisa Raymond – Memphis (1)
- (Spain) Virginia Ruano Pascual – Tashkent (1)
- (Russia) Dinara Safina – Palermo (1)
- (United States) Meghann Shaughnessy – Canberra (1)
- (Argentina) Paola Suárez – Vienna (1)
- (Thailand) Tamarine Tanasugarn – Hyderabad (1)
- (United States) Venus Williams – Antwerp (1)
- (Colombia) Fabiola Zuluaga – Bogotá (1)
- (Russia) Vera Zvonareva – Bol (1)

The following players won their first title:

- (France) Nathalie Dechy – Gold Coast
- (Australia) Alicia Molik – Hobart
- (Thailand) Tamarine Tanasugarn – Hyderabad
- (Russia) Elena Dementieva – Amelia Island
- (Russia) Vera Zvonareva – Bol
- (Russia) Maria Sharapova – Tokyo Japan Open

Titles won by nation:

- Belgium – 17 (Sydney, Dubai, Indian Wells, Charleston, Berlin, Rome, French Open, 's-Hertogenbosch, Stanford, San Diego, Los Angeles, Toronto, U.S. Open, Filderstadt, Zurich, Luxembourg and WTA Tour Championships)
- Russia – 11 (Doha, Sarasota, Amelia Island, Bol, Palermo, Bali, Shanghai, Leipzig, Moscow, Tokyo Japan Open and Quebec City)
- United States – 11 (Canberra, Australian Open, Tokyo Pan Pacific, Paris, Antwerp, Memphis, Miami, Madrid, Eastbourne, Wimbledon and New Haven)
- France – 3 (Gold Coast, Warsaw and Philadelphia)
- Spain – 3 (Estoril, Budapest and Tashkent)
- Israel – 2 (Sopot and Helsinki)
- Italy – 2 (Casablanca and Strasbourg)
- Japan – 2 (Scottsdale and Linz)
- Argentina – 1 (Vienna)
- Australia – 1 (Hobart)
- Bulgaria – 1 (Birmingham)
- Colombia – 1 (Bogotá)
- Greece – 1 (Auckland)
- South Africa – 1 (Acapulco)
- Slovakia – 1 (Pattaya City)
- Thailand – 1 (Hyderabad)

== See also ==
- 2003 ATP Tour
- WTA Tour
- List of female tennis players
- List of tennis tournaments
