= 2003 Serena Williams tennis season =

- Full name: Serena Jameka Williams
- Country: United States
- Calendar prize money: $2,504,871

Singles
- Season record: 38–3 (93%)
- Calendar titles: 4
- Year-end ranking: 3
- Ranking change from previous year: ▼2

Grand Slam & significant results
- Australian Open: W
- French Open: SF
- Wimbledon: W
- US Open: A

Doubles
- Season record: 8–1
- Calendar titles: 1

Grand Slam doubles results
- Australian Open: W
- Wimbledon: 3R

Serena Williams's 2003 tennis season ended abruptly after Wimbledon, as Williams underwent surgery on the quadriceps tendon in her knee at the start of August. Initially she was expected to be out for six to eight weeks.

== Year in detail ==
=== Australian Open and early hard court season ===
==== Hopman Cup ====
Williams began her season at the Hopman Cup as a preparation for the Australian Open teaming up with James Blake. They played their first tie against Uzbekistan represented by Iroda Tulyaganova and Oleg Ogorodov, Williams won her singles and mixed doubles match both in straight sets. In the second tie, they took on the Spanish pairing of Virginia Ruano Pascual and Tommy Robredo and won all their matches in straight sets. In the final tie, they took on Kim Clijsters and Xavier Malisse for a spot in the final, Williams defeated Clijsters in straight sets, but Malisse defeated Blake to push it to a decisive Mixed Doubles match, which Williams and Blake won in a match tie-break. In the final they took on Australia's Alicia Molik and Lleyton Hewitt and won all three matches to take the Hopman Cup.

==== Australian Open ====
"I just can't believe I can now be compared to these women," Serena said of Graf, Margaret Court, Maureen Connolly and Martina Navratilova. "They're such greats and I don't known if I'll accomplish everything they have but to even be in the category of winning four in a row is for me really amazing, it's something I've always dreamed of and wanted to do," Serena added.

— Williams after winning the Serena Slam.

Williams came into the Australian Open trying to win her fourth consecutive slam after winning the 2002 editions of French Open, Wimbledon, and US Open. Williams opened her campaign against Frenchwoman Émilie Loit. Williams fell to a slow start as Loit took advantage and claimed the first set. The second set was close, as Williams was pushed to a tie-break, where Loit was 3 points away from the upset, however Williams took the tie-break by seven points to five. In the deciding set, Williams had two match points at the tenth game, however Loit saved them to take the game. Williams eventually took the match in the twelfth game in her third match point, overcoming 55 unforced errors she hit in the match. In her next match, she took on Els Callens, the match went on plan for Williams, as she only dropped four games, including a bagel in the second set. Williams also produced 21 winners and 13 unforced errors. In the round of 32, Williams faced Thai Tamarine Tanasugarn, and made quick work delivering a double breadstick domination. In the fourth round, Williams made a slow start but eventually defeated Eleni Daniilidou in straight sets to advance. In the last 8, Williams took on compatriot Meghann Shaughnessy, assuring an American semifinalist, however Williams didn't give Shaughnessy a look only dropping two games each set, and was helped by 8 aces she fired down in the match. In the final four, Williams took on Belgian Kim Clijsters. The first set saw Williams struggled, including making two consecutive double faults to give away the set in the tenth game. The second set saw a comeback from the younger Williams as she broke Clijsters in the fifth and ninth game to push it to a decider. In the final set, Clijsters took a commanding lead taking five of the first six games. However Williams made a comeback and won the last six games, including saving two match points in the eight game on the Clijsters serve to advance to the final. In the final, Serena Williams faced older sister Venus, in the siblings fourth consecutive slam final, being the first pair in women's tennis to compete in four consecutive slam finals, the sisters were also squared at four wins a piece in their previous meetings. The first set saw Venus served for the set, but failed to do so, as Serena pushed it to a tie-break and win seven games to four. However the older Williams came back and took the second set. In the final set Venus saved breakpoints in the eight game, but eventually got broken in the tenth game to hand her sister the victory. Serena had 54 errors to Venus' 51, but beat her 37–28 on winners. This win marks Serena holding the four slams, first since Steffi Graf in 1994, this achievement by Serena was dubbed as the "Serena Slam", as it could not be called a Grand Slam as it did not happen in the same calendar year.

Williams played with sister Venus Williams in the doubles tournament. They breezed through the final without dropping a set defeating the teams Rita Grande and Patty Schnyder, Casey Dellacqua and Nicole Sewell, Svetlana Kuznetsova and Martina Navratilova, Kim Clijsters and Ai Sugiyama, and Lindsay Davenport and Lisa Raymond. In the final, they were pushed by Virginia Ruano Pascual and Paolo Suárez, dropping their first set of the tournament, before coming back to take the final two sets. This is the sisters sixth slam title as a team and second Australian Open title.

==== Open Gaz de France ====
Williams' next tournament after her achieving the 'Serena Slam' was at the Open Gaz de France. As the top seed, Williams received a bye in the first round. Her first opponent was Swiss Myriam Casanova, the American dominated the first set with a bagel and the took a tight second set in the tenth game. She then followed it up with a win against Slovak Janette Husárová, winning each set with a drop of only three games. In the final four, Williams took on Eleni Daniilidou and dominated the match dropping only two games both in the first set. She only drop six points on serve in the entire match. In the final, It was against Amélie Mauresmo and dominated the Frenchwoman, the first six games went on serve, before Williams took 9 of the last 11 games to take the title and remain unbeaten in 2013.

==== NASDAQ-100 Open ====
After continuing her boycott of the Pacific Life Open, Williams played at the NASDAQ-100 Open and was the defending champion. After receiving a bye in the first round, she took on Italian Francesca Schiavone, after a tight first set, which Williams took on the twelfth game, she cruised through the second dropping only a game to advance. She then cruised pass Tatiana Panova in straight sets, dropping only three games. In the fourth round, she faced Iroda Tulyaganova, where she took the first set with ease, winning it with a bagel. In the second set, Williams won the set by a break lead, closing it out in the tenth game. In the last 8, Williams faced Frenchwoman Marion Bartoli, Bartoli failed to hold serve in the match getting broken all eight of her service games, while breaking Williams three times. Williams hit 31 winners to aid her in her win. In the semifinals, Williams push pass with a comfortable win, in a rematch of the epic Australian Open semifinal against Kim Clijsters. Williams won in straight sets despite making 37 unforced errors. In the final, Williams took on compatriot and rival Jennifer Capriati, who was celebrating her birthday. Williams broke Capriati in the second game, but Capriati took six of the next eight games to hand Williams her first set drop in the event and first since the Australian Open final. Williams took the first four games of the second set, just to see Capriati reel in four of the next five games to bring it back on serve, however Williams broke her compatriot in the tenth game to push it to a decider. In the final set, Williams dominated allowing only Capriati a game to take her third title of the season and remain unbeaten in the year with 17–0 record.

=== Clay court season and French Open ===
==== Family Circle Cup ====
Williams played her first clay court event of the season at the green clay of Family Circle Cup. As the top seed, she received a bye in the first round, then defeated Dally Randriantefy of Madagascar, dropping only three games, including a bagel in the second. In the following match, She made quick work of Conchita Martínez in 61 minutes, winning both sets at two. She also made quick work of Australian Jelena Dokić, also dropping only two games in each set, despite getting broken once. In the semifinals, Williams faced compatriot Lindsay Davenport. Williams made quick work of the first set, dropping only one game. In the second set, Williams took an early break lead; however Davenport broke back in the eight game. Williams then broke again in the 11th game to serve it out. Williams saved two break points with two aces and eventually closed it out to advance. In the final, Williams took on Belgian Justine Henin-Hardenne. Williams took the first three games to start the match, but Henin-Hardenne took the next six games, allowing Williams to only win 3 of the last 26 points in the set. Williams once again led by a break in the second set, but Henin-Hardenne took six of the last eight games to win the match. This loss marked an end to Williams's undefeated streak in 2003 at 21 wins.

==== Telecom Italia Masters ====
Williams final French Open preparation was at the Telecom Italia Masters. After a bye in the first round, Williams went against Klára Zakopalová and defeated the Czech with a break lead in each set. Williams then dominated Nathalie Dechy, winning the first set at three and scoring a bagel against the Frenchwoman in the second set. Facing Conchita Martínez in the last eight, Williams scraped through a tight first set winning it in the twelfth game, but made easy work in the second set, dropping only 2 games. In the semifinals, Williams took on Frenchwoman Amélie Mauresmo, Williams dominated the first set, dropping only a game. Williams then served for the match in tenth game of the second and was two points away from the match, but Mauresmo broke Williams and then broke her again in the twelfth game to take the set. In the final set, Mauresmo broke Williams in the eight game and then served it out take eliminate Williams.

==== French Open ====
Williams came into the French Open as the top seed and defending champion, and coming in with a 28-match winning streak in slams. Williams started her campaign for a fifth consecutive slam against Barbara Rittner, Williams broke early but Rittner broke back in the fourth game. However, the break seemed to fire up Williams, as Williams won ten of the next eleven games to advance in 52 minutes. She then followed it up with a straight set win against Swiss Marie-Gayanay Mikaelian, dropping just five games. In the third round, Williams delivered a double bagel beatdown against former world no. 7 Barbara Schett in just 40 minutes. Schett won just 20 points, 16 of which came from Williams' unforced errors. In the round of 16, Williams faced Japan's Ai Sugiyama, Sugiyama took an early break lead but Williams came back and won five of next six games, closing it out in the twelfth game. Williams then took control of the second set with a break lead. In the final 8, It was a rematch of the Rome semifinals, when Williams took on Amélie Mauresmo, where Williams took control of the whole match. Williams took the first four games before Mauresmo could take a game, Williams then rallied to take the next six games, along the way taking the first set. I remained on serve as Williams closed it out. Williams made 24 winners to Mauresmo's 5, Mauresmo also hit 35 unforced errors. In the semifinals, Williams took on Justine Henin-Hardenne in rematch of the Charleston final, The pair traded the first two sets, Henin-Hardenne taking the first at two and Williams taking the second at four. In the final set Williams broke in the fourth game to take a break lead and then held serve. However, Henin-Hardenne took six of the last seven games to end Williams 33 match winning streak in Slams. The match didn't go without controversy as Henin-Hardenne was accused of unsportsmanlike conduct when she denied having raised her hand up when Williams hit a first serve in the seventh game and denied such happened.

=== Wimbledon ===
Williams was the world no. 1 and defending coming into the Wimbledon Championships. Williams began her title defense 24-hours after the upset of no. 1 and defending men's champion Lleyton Hewitt, However, Williams did not want to be part of history to have 2 world no. 1 and defending champions bow out in the very first round as she routed compatriot Jill Craybas dropping three games in each set. In the following round, Williams faced Els Callens. Williams broke in the fifth game and that was enough to take the first set. In the second set, Williams took the first four games, however Callens came back and won the next four. But Williams broke once again in the ninth game and then served it out. In the next match, Williams defeated compatriot Laura Granville, breaking Granville once and in the first, which was proven enough to take the set. In the next set, Williams only dropped a game to continue her title defense. In the round of 16, Williams made quick work of Russian Elena Dementieva winning each set at two. In the quarterfinals, Williams had a tough match against another American Jennifer Capriati. Williams started slow, which allowed Capriati to take control of the first set and win it dropping only two games. However, Williams fought back winning the second set dropping only two games as well. In the ninth game of the deciding set, Williams was serving for the match and saved two break points, and eventually closed it out to advance. In the match for a spot in the final, Williams had the tough task as she faces Justine Henin-Hardenne, one of two players who has beaten her in 2003 and the only player she hasn't beaten in 2003. Despite, the anticipation of the match, Williams was proven too much for her Belgian opponent. Williams raced through the first four games, but Henin-Hardenne came back on serve taking the next three games. Williams then broke and served it out to take the first set. In the second set, Williams raced pass it, dropping only two games. The final saw a rematch of last year's final. As it was a sister affair, with Serena taking on sister Venus Williams. Venus took initiative breaking in the second game, and squandered four break points in the fourth game. Serena eventually broke back, but lost her serve while serving to stay in it in the tenth game to hand Venus the first set. Serena finished with 30 unforced errors to Venus' 25. The second set saw the first three games leading to breaks. In the second set, Serena took four of the first five games, Venus got back one of the breaks, but Serena was able to close it out in the tenth game to push it to a final set. As Venus' abdominal strain showed its effects more, with serves around 85 mph and many errors, Serena took initiative and closed out the match in the eight game. This was Serena's 5th slam of the last six and her 6th overall.

She and Venus competed in the doubles as the defending champions, in the first round they took on Corina Morariu and Rennae Stubbs, where they dropped the first set in a tie-break, but cruise pass the next two sets dropping only five games. They then made quick work of Australians Alicia Molik and Samantha Stosur, winning with a double breadstick scoreline. However, they fell to the Russian team of Elena Dementieva and Lina Krasnoroutskaya, losing in the third set 7–5.

=== US Open, Year-End Championships and hard court season ===
Williams had a surgery to repair a partial tear in the middle portion of the quadriceps tendon of her left knee in August, which forced her to withdraw from events following Wimbledon, including the US Open and the Year-End Championships, which in turn also dropped her world no. 1 ranking to Kim Clijsters.

=== Fed Cup ===
Williams represented the United States Fed Cup team against Czech Republic and won all her matches. She defeated Iveta Benešová and Klára Zakopalová in straight sets. She toughed out the first set against Benešová and cruised pass the second set, while against Zakopalová it was all cruise control for the American. She also teamed up with sister Venus Williams to defeat Dája Bedáňová and Eva Birnerová dropping just a game. The Williams sisters made a 5–0 sweep for United States.

== All matches ==
=== Singles matches ===
Tournament	Match	Round	Opponent	Rank	Result	Score
Australian Open; Melbourne, Australia; Grand Slam; Hard; 13–26 January 2003	255	1R	(France) Émilie Loit	#56	Win	3–6, 7–6^{(7–5)}, 7–5
Australian Open; Melbourne, Australia; Grand Slam; Hard; 13–26 January 2003	256	2R	(Belgium) Els Callens	#66	Win	6–4, 6–0
Australian Open; Melbourne, Australia; Grand Slam; Hard; 13–26 January 2003	257	3R	(Thailand) Tamarine Tanasugarn	#32	Win	6–1, 6–1
Australian Open; Melbourne, Australia; Grand Slam; Hard; 13–26 January 2003	258	4R	(Greece) Eleni Daniilidou	#20	Win	6–4, 6–1
Australian Open; Melbourne, Australia; Grand Slam; Hard; 13–26 January 2003	259	QF	(United States) Meghann Shaughnessy	#33	Win	6–2, 6–2
Australian Open; Melbourne, Australia; Grand Slam; Hard; 13–26 January 2003	260	SF	(Belgium) Kim Clijsters	#4	Win	4–6, 6–3, 7-5
Australian Open; Melbourne, Australia; Grand Slam; Hard; 13–26 January 2003	261	F	(United States) Venus Williams	#2	Win	7–6^{(6–4)}3–6, 6–4
Open Gaz de France; Paris, France; WTA Tier II; Hard; 3–9 February 2003	–	1R	Bye			
Open Gaz de France; Paris, France; WTA Tier II; Hard; 3–9 February 2003	262	2R	(Switzerland) Myriam Casanova	#53	Win	6–0, 6–4
Open Gaz de France; Paris, France; WTA Tier II; Hard; 3–9 February 2003	263	QF	(Slovakia) Janette Husárová	#35	Win	6–3, 6–3
Open Gaz de France; Paris, France; WTA Tier II; Hard; 3–9 February 2003	264	SF	(Greece) Eleni Daniilidou	#18	Win	6–2, 6-0
Open Gaz de France; Paris, France; WTA Tier II; Hard; 3–9 February 2003	265	F	(France) Amélie Mauresmo	#7	Win	6–3, 6–2
NASDAQ-100 Open; Key Biscayne, Miami, US; WTA Tier I Hard; 17–30 March 2003	–	1R	Bye			
NASDAQ-100 Open; Key Biscayne, Miami, US; WTA Tier I Hard; 17–30 March 2003	266	2R	(Italy) Francesca Schiavone	#35	Win	7–5, 6–1
NASDAQ-100 Open; Key Biscayne, Miami, US; WTA Tier I Hard; 17–30 March 2003	267	3R	(Russia) Tatiana Panova	#24	Win	6–2, 6–1
NASDAQ-100 Open; Key Biscayne, Miami, US; WTA Tier I Hard; 17–30 March 2003	268	4R	(Uzbekistan) Iroda Tulyaganova	#45	Win	6–0, 6–4
NASDAQ-100 Open; Key Biscayne, Miami, US; WTA Tier I Hard; 17–30 March 2003	269	QF	(France) Marion Bartoli	#87	Win	6–1, 6–2
NASDAQ-100 Open; Key Biscayne, Miami, US; WTA Tier I Hard; 17–30 March 2003	270	SF	(Belgium) Kim Clijsters	#3	Win	6–4, 6-2
NASDAQ-100 Open; Key Biscayne, Miami, US; WTA Tier I Hard; 17–30 March 2003	271	F	(United States) Jennifer Capriati	#5	Win	4–6, 6–4, 6–1
Family Circle Cup; Charleston, US; WTA Tier I Clay, Green; 7–13 April 2003	–	1R	Bye			
Family Circle Cup; Charleston, US; WTA Tier I Clay, Green; 7–13 April 2003	272	2R	(Madagascar) Dally Randriantefy	#95	Win	6–3, 6–0
Family Circle Cup; Charleston, US; WTA Tier I Clay, Green; 7–13 April 2003	273	3R	(Spain) Conchita Martínez	#25	Win	6–2, 6–2
Family Circle Cup; Charleston, US; WTA Tier I Clay, Green; 7–13 April 2003	274	QF	(Australia) Jelena Dokić	#11	Win	6–2, 6–2
Family Circle Cup; Charleston, US; WTA Tier I Clay, Green; 7–13 April 2003	275	SF	(United States) Lindsay Davenport	#5	Win	6–1, 7-5
Family Circle Cup; Charleston, US; WTA Tier I Clay, Green; 7–13 April 2003	276	F	(Belgium) Justine Henin-Hardenne	#4	Loss	3–6, 4–6
Fed Cup World Group: US vs Czech Republic; Massachusetts, United States; Fed Cup; Hard, indoor 26–27 April 2003	277	–	(Czech Republic) Iveta Benešová	#71	Win	7–5, 6–1
Fed Cup World Group: US vs Czech Republic; Massachusetts, United States; Fed Cup; Hard, indoor 26–27 April 2003	278	–	(Czech Republic) Klára Zakopalová	#73	Win	6–2, 6–2
Telecom Italia Masters; Rome, Italy; WTA Tier I Clay, Red; 12–18 May 2003	–	1R	Bye			
Telecom Italia Masters; Rome, Italy; WTA Tier I Clay, Red; 12–18 May 2003	279	2R	(Czech Republic) Klára Zakopalová	#72	Win	6–4, 6–3
Telecom Italia Masters; Rome, Italy; WTA Tier I Clay, Red; 12–18 May 2003	280	3R	(France) Nathalie Dechy	#24	Win	6–3, 6–0
Telecom Italia Masters; Rome, Italy; WTA Tier I Clay, Red; 12–18 May 2003	281	QF	(Spain) Conchita Martínez	#27	Win	7–5, 6–2
Telecom Italia Masters; Rome, Italy; WTA Tier I Clay, Red; 12–18 May 2003	282	SF	(France) Amélie Mauresmo	#9	Loss	6–1, 5–7, 3-6
French Open; Paris, France; Grand Slam; Grass; 26 May - 8 June 2003	283	1R	(Germany) Barbara Rittner	#87	Win	6–2, 6–1
French Open; Paris, France; Grand Slam; Grass; 26 May - 8 June 2003	284	2R	(Switzerland) Marie-Gayanay Mikaelian	#39	Win	6–3, 6–2
French Open; Paris, France; Grand Slam; Grass; 26 May - 8 June 2003	285	3R	(Austria) Barbara Schett	#51	Win	6–0, 6–0
French Open; Paris, France; Grand Slam; Grass; 26 May - 8 June 2003	286	4R	(Japan) Ai Sugiyama	#15	Win	7–5, 6–3
French Open; Paris, France; Grand Slam; Grass; 26 May - 8 June 2003	287	QF	(France) Amélie Mauresmo	#5	Win	6–1, 6–2
French Open; Paris, France; Grand Slam; Grass; 26 May - 8 June 2003	288	SF	(Belgium) Justine Henin-Hardenne	#4	Loss	2–6, 6–4, 5–7
Wimbledon; London, United Kingdom; Grand Slam; Grass; 23 June - 6 July 2003	289	1R	(United States) Jill Craybas	#67	Win	6–3, 6–3
Wimbledon; London, United Kingdom; Grand Slam; Grass; 23 June - 6 July 2003	290	2R	(Belgium) Els Callens	#65	Win	6–4, 6–4
Wimbledon; London, United Kingdom; Grand Slam; Grass; 23 June - 6 July 2003	291	3R	(United States) Laura Granville	#30	Win	6–3, 6–1
Wimbledon; London, United Kingdom; Grand Slam; Grass; 23 June - 6 July 2003	292	4R	(Russia) Elena Dementieva	#16	Win	6–2, 6–2
Wimbledon; London, United Kingdom; Grand Slam; Grass; 23 June - 6 July 2003	293	QF	(United States) Jennifer Capriati	#7	Win	2–6, 6–2, 6–3
Wimbledon; London, United Kingdom; Grand Slam; Grass; 23 June - 6 July 2003	294	SF	(Belgium) Justine Henin-Hardenne	#3	Win	6–3, 6-2
Wimbledon; London, United Kingdom; Grand Slam; Grass; 23 June - 6 July 2003	295	F	(United States) Venus Williams	#4	Win	4–6, 6–4, 6–2

=== Doubles matches ===
Tournament	Match	Round	Partner	Opponents	Rank	Result	Score
Australian Open; Melbourne, Australia; Grand Slam; Hard, outdoor 13–26 January 2003	100	1R	(United States) Venus Williams	(Italy) Rita Grande (Switzerland) Patty Schnyder	#58 #50	Win	6–3, 6–1
Australian Open; Melbourne, Australia; Grand Slam; Hard, outdoor 13–26 January 2003	101	2R	(United States) Venus Williams	(Australia) Casey Dellacqua (Australia) Nicole Sewell	#539 #214	Win	6–3, 6–2
Australian Open; Melbourne, Australia; Grand Slam; Hard, outdoor 13–26 January 2003	102	3R	(United States) Venus Williams	(Russia) Svetlana Kuznetsova (United States) Martina Navratilova	#36 #53	Win	6–3, 6–2
Australian Open; Melbourne, Australia; Grand Slam; Hard, outdoor 13–26 January 2003	103	QF	(United States) Venus Williams	(Belgium) Kim Clijsters (Japan) Ai Sugiyama	#16 #10	Win	6–4, 7–5
Australian Open; Melbourne, Australia; Grand Slam; Hard, outdoor 13–26 January 2003	104	SF	(United States) Venus Williams	(United States) Lindsay Davenport (United States) Lisa Raymond	#98 #3	Win	6–2, 6–2
Australian Open; Melbourne, Australia; Grand Slam; Hard, outdoor 13–26 January 2003	105	F	(United States) Venus Williams	(Spain) Virginia Ruano Pascual (Argentina) Paola Suárez	#2 #1	Win	4–6, 6–4, 6–3
Fed Cup World Group: US vs Czech Republic; Massachusetts, United States; Fed Cup; Hard, indoor 26–27 April 2003	106	–	(United States) Venus Williams	(Czech Republic) Dája Bedáňová (Czech Republic) Eva Birnerová	#80 #257	Win	6–0, 6–1
Wimbledon Championships; London, United Kingdom; Grand Slam; Grass, outdoor 23 June – 6 July 2003	107	1R	(United States) Venus Williams	(United States) Corina Morariu (Australia) Rennae Stubbs	#73 #15	Win	6–7^{(7–9)},6–2, 6–3
Wimbledon Championships; London, United Kingdom; Grand Slam; Grass, outdoor 23 June – 6 July 2003	108	2R	(United States) Venus Williams	(Australia) Alicia Molik (Australia) Samantha Stosur	#44 #136	Win	6–1, 6–1
Wimbledon Championships; London, United Kingdom; Grand Slam; Grass, outdoor 23 June – 6 July 2003	109	3R	(United States) Venus Williams	(Russia) Elena Dementieva (Russia) Lina Krasnoroutskaya	#7 #49	Loss	3–6, 6–3, 5–7

=== Hopman Cup Matches ===
Tournament	Round	Partner	Match	Opponents	Result	Score
Hopman Cup; Perth, Western Australia, Australia; Mixed Exhibition; Hard, indoor 28 December - 4 January 2003
Hopman Cup; Perth, Western Australia, Australia; Mixed Exhibition; Hard, indoor 28 December - 4 January 2003	RR	(United States) James Blake	Singles	(Uzbekistan) Iroda Tulyaganova	Win	6–3, 6–2
Hopman Cup; Perth, Western Australia, Australia; Mixed Exhibition; Hard, indoor 28 December - 4 January 2003	RR	(United States) James Blake	Doubles	(Uzbekistan) Iroda Tulyaganova (Uzbekistan) Oleg Ogorodov	Win	6–3, 6–1
Hopman Cup; Perth, Western Australia, Australia; Mixed Exhibition; Hard, indoor 28 December - 4 January 2003	RR	(United States) James Blake	Singles	(Spain) Virginia Ruano Pascual	Win	6–3, 6–3
Hopman Cup; Perth, Western Australia, Australia; Mixed Exhibition; Hard, indoor 28 December - 4 January 2003	RR	(United States) James Blake	Doubles	(Spain) Virginia Ruano Pascual (Spain) Tommy Robredo	Win	6–1, 6–4
Hopman Cup; Perth, Western Australia, Australia; Mixed Exhibition; Hard, indoor 28 December - 4 January 2003	RR	(United States) James Blake	Singles	(Belgium) Kim Clijsters	Win	7–5, 6–3
Hopman Cup; Perth, Western Australia, Australia; Mixed Exhibition; Hard, indoor 28 December - 4 January 2003	RR	(United States) James Blake	Doubles	(Belgium) Kim Clijsters (Belgium) Xavier Malisse	Win	7–6^{(8–6)}, 3–6, [10–5]
Hopman Cup; Perth, Western Australia, Australia; Mixed Exhibition; Hard, indoor 28 December - 4 January 2003	F	(United States) James Blake	Singles	(Australia) Alicia Molik	Win	6–3, 6–2
Hopman Cup; Perth, Western Australia, Australia; Mixed Exhibition; Hard, indoor 28 December - 4 January 2003	F	(United States) James Blake	Doubles	(Australia) Alicia Molik (Australia) Lleyton Hewitt	Win	6–2, 6–3

== Tournament schedule ==
=== Singles schedule ===
Williams' 2003 singles tournament schedule is as follows:

Date	Championship	Location	Category	Surface	Points	Outcome
13 January 2003 – 26 January 2003	Australian Open	Melbourne (AUS)	Grand Slam	Hard	650	Winner defeated Venus Williams 7–6(6–4), 3–6, 6–1
3 February 2003 – 9 February 2003	Open Gaz de France	Bangalore (IND)	WTA Tier II	Hard	195	Winner defeated Amélie Mauresmo, 6–3, 6–2
17 March 2003 – 30 March 2003	NASDAQ-100 Open	Miami (US)	WTA Tier I	Hard	325	Winner defeated Jennifer Capriati 4–6, 6–4, 6–1
7 April 2003 – 13 April 2003	Family Circle Cup	Charleston (US)	WTA Tier I	Clay (green)	193	Finals lost to Justine Henin-Hardenne 3–6, 4–6
26 April 2003– 27 April 2003	Fed Cup World Group: Czech Republic vs. United States	Massachusetts, (US)	Fed Cup	Hard (i)		United States def. Czech Republic, 5–0; United States Advanced to the Quarterfinals
12 May 2003 – 18 May 2003	Telecom Italia Masters	Rome (ITA)	WTA Tier I	Clay	124	Semifinals lost to Amélie Mauresmo 6–1, 5–7, 3–6
26 May 2003 – 8 June 2003	French Open	Paris (FRA)	Grand Slam	Clay	293	Semifinals lost to Justine Henin-Hardenne, 2–6, 6–4, 5–7
23 June 2003 – 6 July 2003	Wimbledon Championships	London (GBR)	Grand Slam	Grass	650	Winner defeated Venus Williams, 4–6, 6–4, 6–2
Total year-end points					2429	

=== Doubles schedule ===
Williams' 2003 doubles tournament schedule is as follows:

Date	Championship	Location	Category	Partner	Surface	Points	Outcome
13 January 2003 – 26 January 2003	Australian Open	Melbourne (AUS)	Grand Slam	(United States) Venus Williams	Hard	650	Winner defeated Ruano Pascual/Suárez 4–6, 6–4, 6–3
26 April 2003– 27 April 2003	Fed Cup World Group: Czech Republic vs. United States	Massachusetts, (US)	Fed Cup	(United States) Venus Williams	Hard (i)		United States def. Czech Republic, 5–0; United States Advanced to the Quarterfinals
23 June 2003 – 6 July 2003	Wimbledon Championships	London (GBR)	Grand Slam	(United States) Venus Williams	Grass	90	Third Round lost to Dementieva/Krasnoroutskaya, 3–6, 6–3, 5–7
Total year-end points						740	

== Yearly records ==
=== Head–to–head matchups ===
Ordered by percentage of wins

- (Belgium) Els Callens 2–0
- (Czech Republic) Klára Zakopalová 2–0
- (Greece) Eleni Daniilidou 2–0
- (Belgium) Kim Clijsters 2–0
- (United States) Venus Williams 2–0
- (Spain) Conchita Martínez 2–0
- (United States) Jennifer Capriati 2–0
- (Switzerland) Myriam Casanova 1–0
- (Thailand) Tamarine Tanasugarn 1–0
- (United States) Meghann Shaughnessy 1–0
- (Slovakia) Janette Husárová 1–0
- (France) Émilie Loit 1–0
- (Italy) Francesca Schiavone 1–0
- (Russia) Tatiana Panova 1–0
- (Uzbekistan) Iroda Tulyaganova 1–0
- (France) Marion Bartoli 1–0
- (Madagascar) Dally Randriantefy 1–0
- (Australia) Jelena Dokić 1–0
- (Croatia) Karolina Šprem 1–0
- (United States) Lindsay Davenport 1–0
- (Czech Republic) Iveta Benešová 1–0
- (France) Nathalie Dechy 1–0
- (Germany) Barbara Rittner 1–0
- (Switzerland) Marie-Gayanay Mikaelian 1–0
- (Austria) Barbara Schett 1–0
- (Japan) Ai Sugiyama 1–0
- (United States) Jill Craybas 1–0
- (United States) Laura Granville 1–0
- (Russia) Elena Dementieva 1–0
- (France) Amélie Mauresmo 2–1
- (Belgium) Justine Henin-Hardenne 1–2

=== Finals ===
==== Singles: 5 (4–1) ====
Legend Grand Slam (2–0) WTA Tier I (1–1) WTA Tier II (1–0)	Finals by surface Hard (3–0) Clay (0–1) Grass (1–0)	Finals by venue Outdoors (3–1) Indoors (1–0)

Outcome	No.	Date	Tournament	Surface	Opponent in the final	Score in the final
Winner	20.	January 26, 2003	Australian Open, Melbourne, Australia (1)	Hard	(United States) Venus Williams	7–6^{(7–4)}, 3–6, 6–4
Winner	21.	February 3, 2003	Paris, France (2)	Carpet	(France) Amélie Mauresmo	6–3, 6–2
Winner	22.	March 29, 2003	Miami, US (2)	Hard	(United States) Jennifer Capriati	4–6, 6–4, 6–1
Runner-up	7.	April 7, 2003	Charleston, US (1)	Clay (green)	(Belgium) Justine Henin-Hardenne	3–6, 4–6
Winner	23.	July 6, 2003	Wimbledon, London, UK (2)	Grass	(United States) Venus Williams	4–6, 6–4, 6–2

==== Doubles: 1 (1–0) ====
Legend Grand Slam (1–0)	Finals by surface Hard (1–0)	Finals by venue Outdoors (1–0)

Outcome	No.	Date	Championship	Surface	Partner	Opponent in the final	Score in the final
Winner	11.	January 13, 2003	Australian Open, Melbourne, Australia (2)	Hard	(United States) Venus Williams	(Spain) Virginia Ruano Pascual (Argentina) Paola Suárez	4–6, 6–4, 6–3

=== Earnings ===
#	Event	Prize money	Year-to-date
1	Australian Open	$556,534	$556,534
1	Australian Open (Doubles)	$103,553	$660,087
2	Open Gaz de France	$93,000	$753,087
3	NASDAQ-100 Open	$393,000	$1,146.087
4	Family Circle Cup	$96,000	$1,242,087
5	Internazionali BNL d'Italia	$48,600	$1,290,687
6	French Open	$193,304	$1,483,991
7	Wimbledon Championships	$756,122	$2,240,113
7	Wimbledon Championships (Doubles)	$8,925	$2,249,038
			$2,249,038

Figures in United States dollars (USD) unless noted.

== See also ==
- 2003 WTA Tour

Sporting positions
Preceded by Venus Williams; Angelique Kerber	World No. 1 First stint: July 8, 2002 – August 10, 2003; Last stint: April 24, 2017 – May 14, 2017	Succeeded by Kim Clijsters; Angelique Kerber
Preceded by Jennifer Capriati; Justine Henin; Petra Kvitová	Year-end World No. 1; 2002; 2008, 2009; 2012 – 2015	Succeeded by Justine Henin; Kim Clijsters; Angelique Kerber
Awards
Preceded by Jennifer Capriati; Jelena Janković; Petra Kvitová	ITF Women's Singles World Champion; 2002; 2009; 2012 – 2015	Succeeded by Justine Henin; Caroline Wozniacki; Angelique Kerber
Preceded by Martina Hingis & Anna Kournikova; Cara Black & Liezel Huber	WTA Doubles Team of the Year; 2000 (with Venus Williams); 2009 (with Venus Williams)	Succeeded by Lisa Raymond & Rennae Stubbs; Gisela Dulko & Flavia Pennetta
Preceded by Cara Black & Liezel Huber	ITF Women's Doubles World Champion; 2009 (with Venus Williams)	Succeeded by Gisela Dulko & Flavia Pennetta
