= 2003 ASB Classic =

- Date: 30 December – 5 January
- Edition: 18th
- Category: WTA Tier IV
- Draw: 32S / 16D
- Prize money: $140,000
- Surface: Hard / outdoor
- Location: Auckland, New Zealand
- Venue: ASB Tennis Centre

Champions

Singles
- (Greece) Eleni Daniilidou

Doubles
- (United States) Teryn Ashley / (United States) Abigail Spears
- WTA Auckland Open

The 2003 Auckland Open (also named ASB Classic for sponsorship reasons) was a 2003 WTA Tour women's tennis tournament, played on outdoor hard courts. It was the 18th edition of the WTA Auckland Open. It took place at the ASB Tennis Centre in Auckland, New Zealand, from 30 December 2002 to 5 January 2003. Second-seeded Eleni Daniilidou won the singles title and earned $22,000 first-prize money.

== Points and prize money ==
=== Point distribution ===
Event	W	F	SF	QF	Round of 16	Round of 32	Q	Q3	Q2	Q1
Singles	95	67	43	24	12	1	5.5	3.5	2	1
Doubles	95	67	43	24	1	—N/a	6.25	—N/a	—N/a	—N/a

=== Prize money ===
Event	W	F	SF	QF	Round of 16	Round of 32	Q3	Q2	Q1
Singles	$22,000	$12,000	$6,300	$3,400	$1,825	$1,000	$550	$300	$175
Doubles *	$6,500	$3,475	$1,850	$1,000	$550	—N/a	—N/a	—N/a	—N/a

_{* per team}

== Singles main-draw entrants ==
=== Seeds ===
Country	Player	Rank^{1}	Seed
ISR	Anna Pistolesi	16	1
GRE	Eleni Daniilidou	22	2
RUS	Tatiana Panova	23	3
LUX	Anne Kremer	25	4
ARG	Paola Suárez	27	5
ARG	Clarisa Fernández	31	6
SVK	Janette Husárová	33	7
SLO	Katarina Srebotnik	36	8

^{1} Rankings as of 16 December 2002.

=== Other entrants ===
The following players received wildcards into the singles main draw:

- (New Zealand) Leanne Baker
- (New Zealand) Shelley Stephens

The following players received entry from the qualifying draw:

- (Japan) Shinobu Asagoe
- (United States) Ashley Harkleroad
- (Israel) Tzipora Obziler
- (Czech Republic) Renata Voráčová

== Doubles main-draw entrants ==
=== Seeds ===
Country	Player	Country	Player	Rank^{1}	Seed
ZIM	Cara Black	RUS	Elena Likhovtseva	19	1
SLO	Tina Križan	SLO	Katarina Srebotnik	60	2
ITA	Rita Grande	ESP	María José Martínez Sánchez	129	3
GRE	Eleni Daniilidou	AUT	Patricia Wartusch	134	4

^{1} Rankings as of 16 December 2002.

=== Other entrants ===
The following pair received wildcards into the doubles main draw:

- (Greece) Vanessa Henke / (New Zealand) Shelley Stephens

The following pair received entry from the qualifying draw:

- (New Zealand) Leanne Baker / (India) Manisha Malhotra

== Finals ==
=== Singles ===
(Greece) Eleni Daniilidou defeated (South Korea) Cho Yoon-jeong, 6–4, 4–6, 7–6^{(7–2)}

- It was the 1st singles title of the season for Daniilidou and the 2nd title in her career.

=== Doubles ===
(United States) Teryn Ashley / (United States) Abigail Spears defeated (Zimbabwe) Cara Black / (Russia) Elena Likhovtseva, 6–2, 2–6, 6–0

- It was the 1st title for both Ashley and Spears in their respective doubles careers.

== See also ==
- 2003 Heineken Open – men's tournament
