= 2003 Open Gaz de France – Doubles =

Doubles
- 2003 Open Gaz de France

Final
- Champions: (Austria) Barbara Schett (Switzerland) Patty Schnyder
- Runners-up: (France) Marion Bartoli (France) Stéphanie Cohen-Aloro
- Score: 2–6, 6–2, 7–6^{(7–5)}

Events
Singles	Doubles
← 2002 ·	Open Gaz de France	· 2004 →

Nathalie Dechy and Meilen Tu were the defending champions but only Dechy competed that year with Émilie Loit.

Dechy and Loit lost in the semifinals to Barbara Schett and Patty Schnyder.

Schett and Schnyder won in the final 2–6, 6–2, 7–6^{(7–5)} against Marion Bartoli and Stéphanie Cohen-Aloro.

== Seeds ==
Champion seeds are indicated in bold text while text in italics indicates the round in which those seeds were eliminated.

1. (Slovakia) Daniela Hantuchová / (Japan) Ai Sugiyama (first round)
2. (France) Nathalie Dechy / (France) Émilie Loit (semifinals)
3. (Austria) **Barbara Schett** / (Switzerland) **Patty Schnyder (champions)**
4. (Italy) Silvia Farina Elia / (Sweden) Åsa Svensson (first round)

== Draw ==
=== Key ===
- Q = Qualifier
- WC = Wild card
- LL = Lucky loser
- Alt = Alternate
- SE = Special exempt
- PR = Protected ranking
- ITF = ITF entry
- JE = Junior exempt
- w/o = Walkover
- r = Retired
- d = Defaulted
- SR = Special ranking

First round
1	(Slovakia) D Hantuchová (Japan) A Sugiyama	4	2
(Greece) **E Daniilidou** (Australia) **N Pratt**	**6**	**6**
(Netherlands) **K Boogert** (Spain) **M Serna**	**7**	**6**
(Hungary) Z Gubacsi (Ukraine) T Perebiynis	5	0
4	(Italy) S Farina Elia (Sweden) Å Svensson	3	**7^{7}**	4
(France) **S Foretz** (France) **V Razzano**	**6**	6^{4}	**6**
WC	(France) **M Bartoli** (France) **S Cohen-Aloro**	**6**	1	**6**
(Bulgaria) L Bacheva (France) C Dhenin	4	**6**	4
(Czech Republic) **D Bedáňová** (Slovakia) **J Husárová**	**6**	**6**
Q	(Netherlands) K Kilsdonk (France) S Lefèvre	1	2
(France) A Fusai (France) N Tauziat	2	2
3	(Austria) **B Schett** (Switzerland) **P Schnyder**	**6**	**6**
(United States) **A Stevenson** (Ukraine) **E Tatarkova**	**7^{7}**	**6**
(Germany) K Freye (Germany) A Roesch	6^{4}	2
(Italy) R Grande (Spain) M Marrero	1	1
2	(France) **N Dechy** (France) **É Loit**	**6**	**6**

Quarterfinals
(Greece) E Daniilidou (Australia) N Pratt	2	2
(Netherlands) **K Boogert** (Spain) **M Serna**	**6**	**6**
(France) S Foretz (France) V Razzano	6^{4}	6^{5}
WC	(France) **M Bartoli** (France) **S Cohen-Aloro**	**7^{7}**	**7^{7}**
(Czech Republic) D Bedáňová (Slovakia) J Husárová	2	**7**	6^{3}
3	(Austria) **B Schett** (Switzerland) **P Schnyder**	**6**	5	**7^{7}**
(United States) A Stevenson (Ukraine) E Tatarkova	2	1
2	(France) **N Dechy** (United States) **É Loit**	**6**	**6**

Semifinals
(Netherlands) K Boogert (Spain) M Serna	4	3
WC	(France) **M Bartoli** (France) **S Cohen-Aloro**	**6**	**6**
3	(Austria) **B Schett** (Switzerland) **P Schnyder**	**6**	**6**
2	(France) N Dechy (France) É Loit	**6**	**7^{7}**

Final
WC	(France) Marion Bartoli (France) Stéphanie Cohen-Aloro	**6**	2	6^{5}
3	(Austria) **Barbara Schett** (Switzerland) **Patty Schnyder**	2	**6**	**7^{7}**
