= 2003 ASB Classic – Doubles =

Doubles
- 2003 ASB Classic

Final
- Champions: (United States) Teryn Ashley (United States) Abigail Spears
- Runners-up: (Zimbabwe) Cara Black (Russia) Elena Likhovtseva
- Score: 6–2, 2–6, 6–0

Details
- Draw: 16
- Seeds: 4

Events
Singles	Doubles
← 2002 ·	WTA Auckland Open	· 2004 →

Nicole Arendt and Liezel Huber were the defending champions, but none competed this year.

Teryn Ashley and Abigail Spears won the title by defeating Cara Black and Elena Likhovtseva 6–2, 2–6, 6–0 in the final.

== Seeds ==
1. (Zimbabwe) Cara Black / (Russia) Elena Likhovtseva (final)
2. (Slovenia) Tina Križan / (Slovenia) Katarina Srebotnik (quarterfinals)
3. (Italy) Rita Grande / (Spain) María José Martínez Sánchez (first round)
4. (Greece) Eleni Daniilidou / (Austria) Patricia Wartusch (first round)

== Draw ==
=== Key ===
- Q = Qualifier
- WC = Wild card
- LL = Lucky loser
- Alt = Alternate
- ITF = ITF entry
- PR = Protected ranking
- SR = Special ranking
- SE = Special exempt
- JE = Junior exempt
- JR = Junior Accelerator Programme entrant
- CO = College Accelerator Programme entrant
- NG = Next Gen Accelerator Program entrant
- w/o = Walkover
- r = Retired
- d = Defaulted

=== Draw ===
First round
1	(Zimbabwe) C Black (Russia) E Likhovtseva	6	6
(Switzerland) E Gagliardi (Slovakia) H Nagyová	4	3
(Australia) C Barclay (Germany) M Müller	1	7	7
WC	(Germany) V Henke (New Zealand) S Stephens	6	5	5
4	(Greece) E Daniilidou (Austria) P Wartusch	3	3
PR	(France) M Pierce (Argentina) P Suárez	6	6
(Russia) A Jidkova (Russia) T Panova	7^{7}	5	6
(United States) J Hopkins (United States) B Rippner	6^{2}	7	2
(United States) M Tu (Canada) V Webb	5	3
(South Africa) N de Villiers (Netherlands) A van Exel	7	6
(United States) A Harkleroad (United States) ME Salerni	6	6
3	(Italy) R Grande (Spain) MJ Martínez Sánchez	4	3
(United States) T Ashley (United States) A Spears	6	4	6
(South Africa) K Grant (Germany) J Wöhr	3	6	2
Q	(New Zealand) L Baker (India) M Malhotra	3	5
2	(Slovenia) T Križan (Slovenia) K Srebotnik	6	7

Quarterfinals
1	(Zimbabwe) C Black (Russia) E Likhovtseva	6	6
(Australia) C Barclay (Germany) M Müller	2	2
PR	(France) M Pierce (Argentina) P Suárez	3	3
(Russia) A Jidkova (Russia) T Panova	6	6
(South Africa) N de Villiers (Netherlands) A van Exel	3	1
(United States) A Harkleroad (United States) ME Salerni	6	6
(United States) T Ashley (United States) A Spears	6	6
2	(Slovenia) T Križan (Slovenia) K Srebotnik	2	2

Semifinals
1	(Zimbabwe) C Black (Russia) E Likhovtseva	6	6
(Russia) A Jidkova (Russia) T Panova	1	0
(United States) A Harkleroad (United States) ME Salerni	2	3
(United States) T Ashley (United States) A Spears	6	6

Final
1	(Zimbabwe) C Black (Russia) E Likhovtseva	2	6	0
(United States) T Ashley (United States) A Spears	6	2	6
