= 2003 Open Gaz de France – Singles =

Singles
- 2003 Open Gaz de France

Final
- Champion: (United States) Serena Williams
- Runner-up: (France) Amélie Mauresmo
- Score: 6–3, 6–2

Details
- Draw: 28
- Seeds: 8

Events
Singles	Doubles
← 2002 ·	Open Gaz de France	· 2004 →

Venus Williams was the defending champion but did not compete that year.

Serena Williams won in the final 6–3, 6–2 against Amélie Mauresmo.

== Seeds ==
A champion seed is indicated in bold text while text in italics indicates the round in which that seed was eliminated. The top four seeds received a bye to the second round.

1. (United States) **Serena Williams (champion)**
2. (Slovakia) Daniela Hantuchová (quarterfinals)
3. (France) Amélie Mauresmo (final)
4. (Federal Republic of Yugoslavia) Jelena Dokić (quarterfinals)
5. (Switzerland) Patty Schnyder (first round)
6. (Italy) Silvia Farina Elia (first round)
7. (Israel) Anna Pistolesi (first round)
8. (Greece) Eleni Daniilidou (semifinals)

== Draw ==
=== Key ===
- Q = Qualifier
- WC = Wild card
- LL = Lucky loser
- Alt = Alternate
- SE = Special exempt
- PR = Protected ranking
- ITF = ITF entry
- JE = Junior exempt
- w/o = Walkover
- r = Retired
- d = Defaulted
- SR = Special ranking

=== Final ===
Final
1	(United States) **Serena Williams**	**6**	**6**
3	(France) Amélie Mauresmo	3	2

=== Section 1 ===
First round
(Switzerland) **M Casanova**	4	**7**	**6**
(Austria) B Schett	**6**	5	3
(Slovakia) **J Husárová**	1	**6**	**6**
Q	(Germany) G Arn	**6**	2	0
(Slovenia) **T Pisnik**	**6**	**6**
5	(Switzerland) P Schnyder	3	3
Q	(France) V Razzano	3	2
(France) **É Loit**	**6**	**6**
Q	(France) **S Foretz**	**6**	5	**7**
(Australia) N Pratt	2	**7**	5
(United States) A Stevenson	3	5
8	(Greece) **E Daniilidou**	**6**	**7**

Second round
1	(United States) **S Williams**	**6**	**6**
(Switzerland) M Casanova	0	4
(Slovakia) **J Husárová**	**6**	**6**
(Slovenia) T Pisnik	4	3
4	(Federal Republic of Yugoslavia) **J Dokić**	**6**	**6**
(France) É Loit	3	4
Q	(France) S Foretz	0	4
8	(Greece) **E Daniilidou**	**6**	**6**

Quarterfinals
1	(United States) **S Williams**	**6**	**6**
(Slovakia) J Husárová	3	3
4	(Federal Republic of Yugoslavia) J Dokić	1	3
8	(Greece) **E Daniilidou**	**6**	**6**

Semifinals
1	(United States) **S Williams**	**6**	**6**
8	(Greece) E Daniilidou	2	0

=== Section 2 ===
First round
7	(Israel) A Pistolesi	3	2
WC	(France) **S Cohen-Aloro**	**6**	**6**
(Czech Republic) D Bedáňová	3	6^{5}
(Spain) **M Serna**	**6**	**7^{7}**
(Japan) **A Sugiyama**	**6**	**6**
(France) N Dechy	2	4
6	(Italy) S Farina Elia	3	**6**	5
(Italy) **R Grande**	**6**	1	**7**
Q	(Czech Republic) D Chládková	4	3
(Russia) **E Dementieva**	**6**	**6**
WC	(France) M Bartoli	3	4
(Slovenia) **M Matevžič**	**6**	**6**

Second round
WC	(France) S Cohen-Aloro	6^{3}	**7^{7}**	3
(Spain) **M Serna**	**7^{7}**	6^{2}	**6**
(Japan) A Sugiyama	5	2
3	(France) **A Mauresmo**	**7**	**6**
(Italy) R Grande	3	**6**	3
(Russia) **E Dementieva**	**6**	4	**6**
(Slovenia) M Matevžič	3	3
2	(Slovakia) **D Hantuchová**	**6**	**6**

Quarterfinals
(Spain) M Serna	6^{4}	4
3	(France) **A Mauresmo**	**7^{7}**	**6**
(Russia) **E Dementieva**	**7**	**6**
2	(Slovakia) D Hantuchová	5	3

Semifinals
3	(France) **A Mauresmo**	**6**	**6**
(Russia) E Dementieva	0	0
