= 2003 ASB Classic – Singles =

Singles
- 2003 ASB Classic

Final
- Champion: (Greece) Eleni Daniilidou
- Runner-up: (South Korea) Cho Yoon-jeong
- Score: 6–4, 4–6, 7–6^{(7–2)}

Details
- Draw: 32
- Seeds: 8

Events
Singles	Doubles
- WTA Auckland Open

Anna Smashnova-Pistolesi was the defending champion, but retired in the semifinals against Cho Yoon-jeong.

Eleni Daniilidou defeated Cho 6–4, 4–6, 7–6^{(7–2)} in the final to win her title..

== Seeds ==
1. (Israel) Anna Smashnova-Pistolesi (semifinals, retired)
2. (Greece) Eleni Daniilidou (champion)
3. (Russia) Tatiana Panova (first round)
4. (Luxembourg) Anne Kremer (first round)
5. (Argentina) Paola Suárez (quarterfinals)
6. (Argentina) Clarisa Fernández (second round)
7. (Slovakia) Janette Husárová (first round)
8. (Slovenia) Katarina Srebotnik (first round)

== Draw ==
Key

- Q = Qualifier
- WC = Wild card
- LL = Lucky loser
- Alt = Alternate
- ITF = ITF entry
- PR = Protected ranking
- SR = Special ranking
- SE = Special exempt
- JE = Junior exempt
- JR = Junior Accelerator Programme entrant
- CO = College Accelerator Programme entrant
- NG = Next Gen Accelerator Program entrant
- w/o = Walkover
- r = Retired
- d = Defaulted

=== Finals ===
Semifinals
1	(Israel) Anna Smashnova-Pistolesi	6^{2}	2^{r}
(South Korea) Cho Yoon-jeong	7^{7}	2
(Switzerland) Emmanuelle Gagliardi	4	3
2	(Greece) Eleni Daniilidou	6	6

Final
(South Korea) Cho Yoon-jeong	4	6	6^{2}
2	(Greece) Eleni Daniilidou	6	4	7^{7}

=== Top half ===
First round
1	(Israel) A Smashnova-Pistolesi	6	6
Q	(Israel) T Obziler	4	3
(Slovakia) H Nagyová	4	2
(Russia) E Likhovtseva	6	6
(United States) M Tu	7	3	6
(Slovakia) M Suchá	5	6	2
(United States) J Craybas	7^{7}	6
8	(Slovenia) K Srebotnik	6^{2}	4
3	(Russia) T Panova	4	1
(Russia) V Zvonareva	6	6
(Italy) A Serra Zanetti	3	6^{8}
(Germany) A Barna	6	7^{10}
(South Korea) Y-j Cho	6^{8}	6	6
(Austria) P Wartusch	7^{10}	2	0
Q	(Czech Republic) R Voráčová	6^{1}	7	4
6	(Argentina) C Fernández	7^{7}	5	6

Second round
1	(Israel) A Smashnova-Pistolesi	6	7^{7}
(Russia) E Likhovtseva	3	6^{3}
(United States) M Tu	4	4
(United States) J Craybas	6	6
(Russia) V Zvonareva	6	6
(Germany) A Barna	3	4
(South Korea) Y-j Cho	7	6
6	(Argentina) C Fernández	5	2

Quarterfinals
1	(Israel) A Smashnova-Pistolesi	6	6
(United States) J Craybas	3	1
(Russia) V Zvonareva	6^{3}	6	3
(South Korea) Y-j Cho	7^{7}	1	6

Semifinal
1	(Israel) A Smashnova-Pistolesi	6^{2}	2^{r}
(South Korea) Y-j Cho	7^{7}	2

=== Bottom half ===
First round
7	(Slovakia) J Husárová	1	2
(Zimbabwe) C Black	6	6
(United States) L Granville	6	6
WC	(New Zealand) S Stephens	2	1
(Italy) R Grande	6^{2}	1
(Switzerland) E Gagliardi	7^{7}	6
Q	(United States) A Harkleroad	6	6
4	(Luxembourg) A Kremer	3	0
5	(Argentina) P Suárez	6	6
(Italy) ME Camerin	1	0
(France) M Pierce	6	7
(Germany) A Rösch	4	5
WC	(New Zealand) L Baker	5	6	2
(Germany) M Müller	7	4	6
Q	(Japan) S Asagoe	3	2
2	(Greece) E Daniilidou	6	6

Second round
(Zimbabwe) C Black	3	2
(United States) L Granville	6	6
(Switzerland) E Gagliardi	6	1	7^{7}
Q	(United States) A Harkleroad	2	6	6^{5}
5	(Argentina) P Suárez	4	6	6
(France) M Pierce	6	4	4
(Germany) M Müller	3	0
2	(Greece) E Daniilidou	6	6

Quarterfinals
(United States) L Granville	6	3	4
(Switzerland) E Gagliardi	3	6	6
5	(Argentina) P Suárez	6	1	6^{4}
2	(Greece) E Daniilidou	1	6	7^{7}

Semifinal
(Switzerland) E Gagliardi	4	3
2	(Greece) E Daniilidou	6	6
