= 2003 Open Gaz de France =

- Date: 3–9 February
- Edition: 11th
- Category: Tier II
- Draw: 28S / 16D
- Prize money: $585,000
- Location: Paris, France
- Venue: Stade Pierre de Coubertin

Champions

Singles
- (United States) Serena Williams

Doubles
- (Austria) Barbara Schett / (Switzerland) Patty Schnyder
← 2002 ·	Open Gaz de France	· 2004 →

The 2003 Open Gaz de France was a women's tennis tournament played on indoor hard courts at the Stade Pierre de Coubertin in Paris, France that was part of Tier II of the 2003 WTA Tour. It was the eleventh edition of the tournament and was held from 3 February through 9 February 2003. First-seeded Serena Williams won the singles title.

== Finals ==
=== Singles ===
(United States) Serena Williams defeated (France) Amélie Mauresmo 6–2, 6–3

- It was Williams's 1st title of the year and the 32nd title of her career.

=== Doubles ===
(Austria) Barbara Schett / (Switzerland) Patty Schnyder defeated (France) Marion Bartoli / (France) Stéphanie Cohen-Aloro 2–6, 6–2, 7–6 (7–5)

- It was Schett's only title of the year and the 10th title of her career. It was Schnyder's only title of the year and the 11th of her career.
