= 2003 Fed Cup World Group =

Part of tennis tournament

- Date: 26 April – 23 November
- Edition: 13th

Champions
- France
- Fed Cup

The World Group was the highest level of Fed Cup competition in 2003. Sixteen nations competed in a four-round knockout competition. Slovakia was the defending champion, but they were defeated in the quarterfinals by Belgium. France defeated United States in the final to win their second title and claim the World No. 1 ranking.

== Participating teams ==
Participating teams
Argentina	Australia	Austria	Belgium
Colombia	Croatia	Czech Republic	France
Germany	Italy	Russia	Slovakia
Slovenia	Spain	Sweden	United States

== Draw ==
First round 26–27 April
Ettenheim, Germany (Outdoor clay)
1	Slovakia	3
Germany	2
Bree, Belgium (Indoor clay)
Austria	0
5	Belgium	5
Linköping, Sweden (Indoor hard)
7	Italy	3
Sweden	2
Lowell, Massachusetts, United States (Indoor hard)
Czech Republic	0
3	United States	5
Moscow, Russia (Indoor carpet)
4	Russia	4
Croatia	1
Buenos Aires, Argentina (Outdoor clay)
Slovenia	3
8	Argentina	2
Andrézieux-Bouthéon, France (Indoor clay)
6	France	5
Colombia	0
Tarragona, Spain (Outdoor clay)
Australia	2
2	Spain	3

Quarterfinals; 19–20 July
Charleroi, Belgium (Indoor hard)
1	Slovakia	0
5	Belgium	5
Washington, D.C., United States (Outdoor hard)
7	Italy	0
3	United States	5
Portorož, Slovenia (Outdoor clay)
4	Russia	5
Slovenia	0
Oviedo, Spain (Outdoor clay)
6	France	4
2	Spain	1

Semifinals; 19–20 November
Moscow, Russia (Indoor carpet)
5	Belgium	1
3	United States	4
Moscow, Russia (Indoor carpet)
4	Russia	2
6	France	3

Final; 22–23 November
Moscow, Russia (Indoor carpet)
3	United States	1
6	France	4

== First round ==
=== Slovakia vs. Germany ===
Slovakia
3
Tennis Center Ettenheim, Ettenheim, Germany
26–27 April 2003
Red clay (outdoors)

Germany
2

			1	2	3
1	(Slovakia) (Germany)	Ľudmila Cervanová; Anca Barna	6; 3	2; 6	2; 6
2	(Slovakia) (Germany)	Daniela Hantuchová; Marlene Weingärtner	2; 6	7^{7} 6^{5}	7; 5
3	(Slovakia) (Germany)	Daniela Hantuchová; Anca Barna	2; 6	6; 3	6; 1
4	(Slovakia) (Germany)	Ľudmila Cervanová; Marlene Weingärtner	6; 2	6; 1
5	(Slovakia) (Germany)	Eva Fislová / Ľubomíra Kurhajcová; Martina Müller / Barbara Rittner	5; 7	6^{4} 7^{7}

=== Austria vs. Belgium ===
Austria
0
Expodroom Bree, Bree, Belgium
26–27 April 2003
Red clay (indoors)

Belgium
5

			1	2	3
1	(Austria) (Belgium)	Evelyn Fauth; Kim Clijsters	6; 4	2; 6	2; 6
2	(Austria) (Belgium)	Patricia Wartusch; Justine Henin-Hardenne	2; 6	1; 6
3	(Austria) (Belgium)	Patricia Wartusch; Kim Clijsters	2; 6	2; 6
4	(Austria) (Belgium)	Evelyn Fauth; Els Callens	6^{0} 7^{7}	2; 6
5	(Austria) (Belgium)	Sybille Bammer / Yvonne Meusburger; Els Callens / Kim Clijsters	2; 6	2; 6

=== Italy vs. Sweden ===
Italy
3
Linköping, Sweden
26–27 April 2003
Premier hard (indoors)

Sweden
2

			1	2	3
1	(Italy) (Sweden)	Antonella Serra Zanetti; Sofia Arvidsson	4; 6	7^{7} 6^{2}	3; 6
2	(Italy) (Sweden)	Flavia Pennetta; Hanna Nooni	6; 4	6; 3
3	(Italy) (Sweden)	Flavia Pennetta; Sofia Arvidsson	6; 0	6; 4
4	(Italy) (Sweden)	Antonella Serra Zanetti; Hanna Nooni	6; 0	2; 6	4; 6
5	(Italy) (Sweden)	Flavia Pennetta / Roberta Vinci; Sofia Arvidsson / Maria Wolfbrandt	6; 2	6; 1

=== Czech Republic vs. United States ===
Czech Republic
0
The Paul E. Tsongas Arena, Lowell, MA, United States
26–27 April 2003
Plexipave (indoors)

United States
5

			1	2	3
1	(Czech Republic) (United States)	Dája Bedáňová; Venus Williams	1; 6	0; 6
2	(Czech Republic) (United States)	Iveta Benešová; Serena Williams	5; 7	1; 6
3	(Czech Republic) (United States)	Klára Koukalová; Serena Williams	2; 6	2; 6
4	(Czech Republic) (United States)	Iveta Benešová; Venus Williams	3; 6	2; 6
5	(Czech Republic) (United States)	Dája Bedáňová / Eva Birnerová; Serena Williams / Venus Williams	0; 6	1; 6

=== Russia vs. Croatia ===
Russia
4
Druzhba Multipurpose Arena, Moscow, Russia
26–27 April 2003
Taraflex (indoors)

Croatia
1

			1	2	3
1	(Russia) (Croatia)	Anastasia Myskina; Karolina Šprem	6; 1	3; 6	6; 0
2	(Russia) (Croatia)	Elena Dementieva; Iva Majoli	6; 1	6; 4
3	(Russia) (Croatia)	Anastasia Myskina; Iva Majoli	6; 2	7; 5
4	(Russia) (Croatia)	Elena Likhovtseva; Karolina Šprem	4; 6	3; 6
5	(Russia) (Croatia)	Elena Dementieva / Anastasia Myskina; Darija Jurak / Matea Mezak	6; 4	6; 4

=== Slovenia vs. Argentina ===
Slovenia
3
Pilar, Argentine
26–27 April 2003
Taraflex (indoors)

Argentina
2

			1	2	3
1	(Slovenia) (Argentina)	Tina Pisnik; María Emilia Salerni	7; 5	6; 3
2	(Slovenia) (Argentina)	Katarina Srebotnik; Natalia Garbellotto	6; 1	6; 2
3	(Slovenia) (Argentina)	Katarina Srebotnik; María Emilia Salerni	6; 3	6^{1} 7^{7}	6; 1
4	(Slovenia) (Argentina)	Maja Matevžič; Natalia Gussoni	4; 6	2; 6
5	(Slovenia) (Argentina)	Tina Križan / Tina Pisnik; Natalia Gussoni / María Emilia Salerni	2; 6	6; 3	4; 6

=== France vs. Colombia ===
France
5
Palais de Sports des Bullieux, Andrézieux-Bouthéon, France
26–27 April 2003
Red clay (indoors)

Colombia
0

			1	2	3
1	(France) (Colombia)	Nathalie Dechy; Fabiola Zuluaga	6; 1	6^{7} 7^{9}	6; 4
2	(France) (Colombia)	Amélie Mauresmo; Catalina Castaño	5; 1			retired
3	(France) (Colombia)	Amélie Mauresmo; Fabiola Zuluaga	6; 4	6; 4
4	(France) (Colombia)	Nathalie Dechy; Romy Farah	6; 2	6; 2
5	(France) (Colombia)	Émilie Loit / Virginie Razzano; Carolina Escamilla / Romy Farah	6; 1	6; 1

=== Australia vs. Spain ===
Australia
2
Club Tenis Tarragona, Tarragona, Spain
26–27 April 2003
Red clay (outdoors)

Spain
3

			1	2	3
1	(Australia) (Spain)	Alicia Molik; Virginia Ruano Pascual	6; 3	6; 4
2	(Australia) (Spain)	Nicole Pratt; Magüi Serna	3; 6	2; 6
3	(Australia) (Spain)	Nicole Pratt; Conchita Martínez	1; 6	2; 6
4	(Australia) (Spain)	Alicia Molik; Magüi Serna	4; 6	1; 6
5	(Australia) (Spain)	Alicia Molik / Rennae Stubbs; Anabel Medina Garrigues / Virginia Ruano Pascual	4; 6	6; 2	6; 3

== Quarterfinals ==
=== Slovakia vs. Belgium ===
Slovakia
0
Spiroudome, Charleroi, Belgium
19–20 July 2003
Decoturf II (indoors)

Belgium
5

			1	2	3
1	(Slovakia) (Belgium)	Janette Husárová; Justine Henin-Hardenne	5; 7	4; 6
2	(Slovakia) (Belgium)	Ľubomíra Kurhajcová; Kim Clijsters	3; 6	1; 6
3	(Slovakia) (Belgium)	Janette Husárová; Kim Clijsters	0; 6	1; 6
4	(Slovakia) (Belgium)	Eva Fislová; Justine Henin-Hardenne	2; 6	1; 6
5	(Slovakia) (Belgium)	Jarmila Gajdošová / Ľubomíra Kurhajcová; Els Callens / Caroline Maes	4; 6	5; 7

=== Italy vs. United States ===
Italy
0
William H.G. Fitzgerald Tennis Centre, Washington, D.C., United States
19–20 July 2003
Decoturf II (outdoors)

United States
5

			1	2	3
1	(Italy) (United States)	Francesca Schiavone; Meghann Shaughnessy	3; 6	4; 6
2	(Italy) (United States)	Rita Grande; Chanda Rubin	3; 6	3; 6
3	(Italy) (United States)	Francesca Schiavone; Chanda Rubin	7; 5	4; 6	0; 6
4	(Italy) (United States)	Rita Grande; Meghann Shaughnessy	3; 6	5; 7
5	(Italy) (United States)	Tathiana Garbin / Antonella Serra Zanetti; Lisa Raymond / Alexandra Stevenson	1; 6	2; 6

=== Russia vs. Slovenia ===
Russia
5
SRC Marina Portorož, Portorož, Slovenia
19–20 July 2003
Red clay (outdoors)

Slovenia
0

			1	2	3
1	(Russia) (Slovenia)	Anastasia Myskina; Maja Matevžič	6; 4	6; 1
2	(Russia) (Slovenia)	Elena Dementieva; Katarina Srebotnik	6; 1	6; 3
3	(Russia) (Slovenia)	Elena Bovina; Katarina Srebotnik	7^{7} 6^{4}	6; 2
4	(Russia) (Slovenia)	Vera Zvonareva; Maja Matevžič	6; 1	6; 2
5	(Russia) (Slovenia)	Elena Dementieva / Anastasia Myskina; Tina Križan / Katarina Srebotnik	6; 2	6; 3

=== France vs. Spain ===
France
4
Escuela de Tenis Municipál Parque del Oeste, Oviedo, Spain
19–20 July 2003
Red clay (indoors)

Spain
1

			1	2	3
1	(France) (Spain)	Nathalie Dechy; Magüi Serna	6; 3	6; 4
2	(France) (Spain)	Amélie Mauresmo; María Sánchez Lorenzo	6; 3	6; 3
3	(France) (Spain)	Amélie Mauresmo; Magüi Serna	7; 5	6; 2
4	(France) (Spain)	Stéphanie Cohen-Aloro; María Sánchez Lorenzo	6; 3	6; 4
5	(France) (Spain)	Nathalie Dechy / Émilie Loit; Anabel Medina Garrigues / Virginia Ruano Pascual	4; 6	4; 6

== Semifinals ==
=== Belgium vs. United States ===
Belgium
1
Olympic Stadium, Moscow, Russia
19–20 November 2003
Taraflex (indoors)

United States
4

			1	2	3
1	(Belgium) (United States)	Caroline Maes; Lisa Raymond	2; 6	1; 6
2	(Belgium) (United States)	Kirsten Flipkens; Meghann Shaughnessy	7^{7} 6^{4}	6^{8} 7^{10}	7; 9
3	(Belgium) (United States)	Els Callens; Meghann Shaughnessy	6; 3	7^{7} 6^{5}
4	(Belgium) (United States)	Elke Clijsters; Lisa Raymond	2; 6	1; 6
5	(Belgium) (United States)	Elke Clijsters / Caroline Maes; Martina Navratilova / Lisa Raymond	1; 6	4; 6

=== Russia vs. France ===
Russia
2
Olympic Stadium, Moscow, Russia
19–20 November 2003
Taraflex (indoors)

France
3

			1	2	3
1	(Russia) (France)	Vera Zvonareva; Amélie Mauresmo	2; 6	2; 6
2	(Russia) (France)	Anastasia Myskina; Mary Pierce	4; 6	7^{7} 6^{2}	7; 5
3	(Russia) (France)	Anastasia Myskina; Amélie Mauresmo	7^{7} 6^{3}	3; 6	4; 6
4	(Russia) (France)	Vera Zvonareva; Mary Pierce	4; 6	6; 3	3; 6
5	(Russia) (France)	Anastasia Myskina / Nadia Petrova; Stéphanie Cohen-Aloro / Émilie Loit	6; 3	1; 6	6; 3

== Final ==
=== United States vs. France ===
United States
1
Olympic Stadium, Moscow, Russia
22–23 November 2003
Taraflex (indoors)

France
4

			1	2	3
1	(United States) (France)	Lisa Raymond; Amélie Mauresmo	4; 6	3; 6
2	(United States) (France)	Meghann Shaughnessy; Mary Pierce	3; 6	6; 3	6; 8
3	(United States) (France)	Meghann Shaughnessy; Amélie Mauresmo	2; 6	1; 6
4	(United States) (France)	Alexandra Stevenson; Émilie Loit	4; 6	2; 6
5	(United States) (France)	Martina Navratilova / Lisa Raymond; Stéphanie Cohen-Aloro / Émilie Loit	6; 4	6; 0

2003 Fed Cup champions

France
Second title

== See also ==
- Fed Cup structure
