= 2003 Family Circle Cup =

- Date: April 7–13
- Edition: 31st
- Category: WTA Tier I Event
- Draw: 64S / 32D
- Surface: Clay / outdoor
- Location: Charleston, SC, U.S.
- Venue: Family Circle Tennis Center
- Attendance: 81,389

Champions

Singles
- (Belgium) Justine Henin-Hardenne

Doubles
- (Spain) Virginia Ruano / (Argentina) Paola Suárez
| ← 2002 · | Family Circle Cup | · 2004 → |

The 2003 Family Circle Cup was a women's tennis tournament and the 31st edition of the Family Circle Cup. This WTA Tier I Event was held at the Family Circle Tennis Center in Charleston, South Carolina, United States and played on outdoor clay courts. Second-seeded Justine Henin-Hardenne won the singles title.

== Finals ==
=== Singles ===
(Belgium) Justine Henin-Hardenne defeated (United States) Serena Williams 6–3, 6–4

=== Doubles ===
(Spain) Virginia Ruano Pascual / (Argentina) Paola Suárez defeated (Slovakia) Janette Husárová / (Spain) Conchita Martínez 6–0, 6–3
