= Kim Clijsters career statistics =

Career finals
Discipline	Type	Won	Lost	Total
Singles	Grand Slam	4	4	8
Singles	WTA Finals (Note: Formerly known as: Virginia Slims Championships (until 1995); WTA Tour Championships (until 2014))	3	0	3
Singles	WTA 1000 (Note: Formerly known as: Category 4 & 5 & 6 (until 1990); Tier I (until 2009); WTA Premier Mandatory and 5 (until 2021))	7	3	10
Singles	WTA 500 (Note: Formerly known as: Category 3 (until 1990); Tier II (until 2009); WTA Premier (until 2021))	18	10	28
Singles	WTA 250 (Note: Formerly known as: Category 1 & 2 (until 1990); Tier III & IV & V (until 2009); WTA International (until 2021))	9	2	11
Singles	Olympics	–	–	–
Singles	Total	41	19	60
Doubles	Grand Slam	2	1	3
Doubles	WTA Finals	0	1	1
Doubles	WTA 1000	1	2	3
Doubles	WTA 500	5	3	8
Doubles	WTA 250	3	2	5
Doubles	Olympics	–	–	–
Doubles	Total	11	9	20
Mixed	Grand Slam	0	1	1
Mixed	Total	0	1	1

The career of Belgian former professional tennis player Kim Clijsters started when she turned professional in 1997 and lasted until her official retirement in 2022. During her career Clijsters won 41 singles titles, including 4 titles at Grand Slam events. She reached the No. 1 ranking on 11 August 2003, and held that position for a total of 20 weeks. Her singles career win–loss record is 485–126 (79.9%). Clijsters won 11 doubles titles during her career, including two at a Grand Slam event, and was ranked No. 1 in doubles on 4 August 2003.

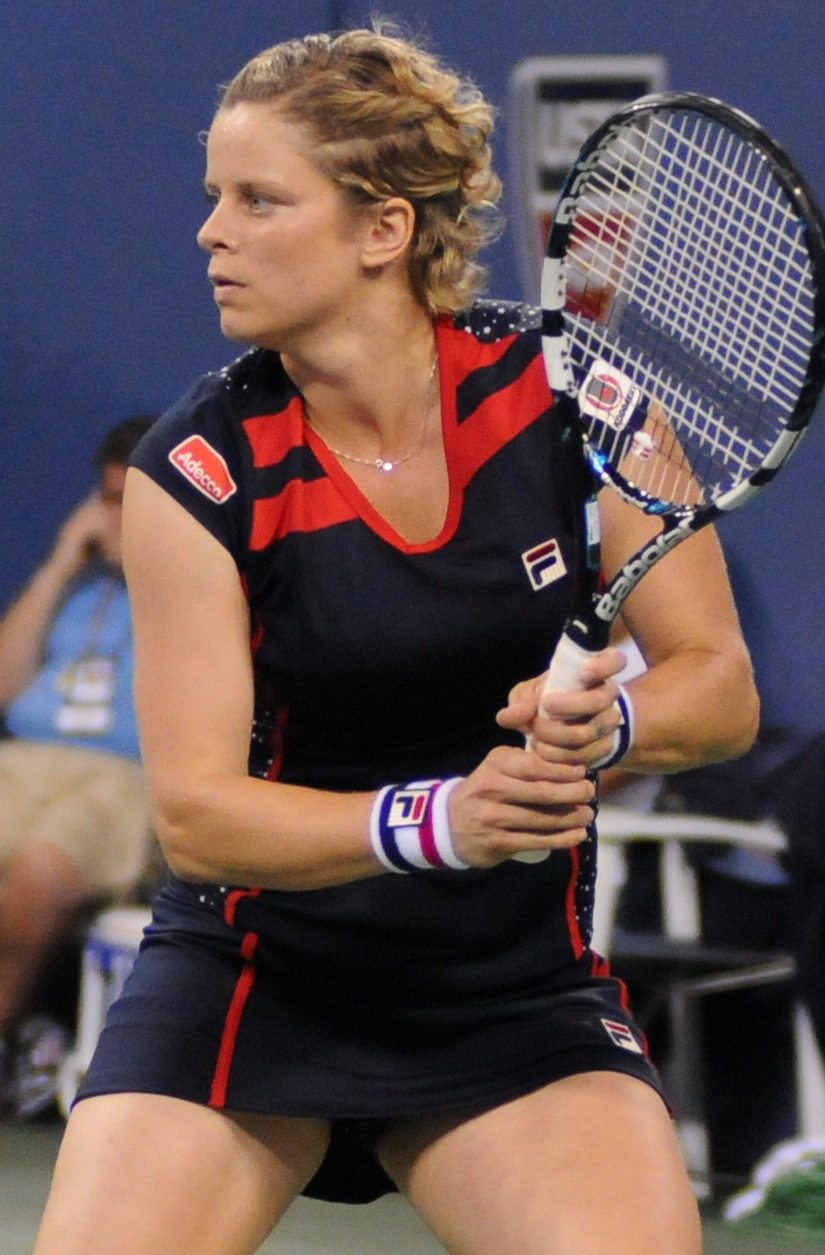
Clijsters at the 2012 US Open

== Performance timelines ==
Key
W	F	SF	QF	#R	RR	Q#	P#	DNQ	A	Z#	PO	G	S	B	NMS	NTI	P	NH

(W) winner; (F) finalist; (SF) semifinalist; (QF) quarterfinalist; (#R) rounds 4, 3, 2, 1; (RR) round-robin stage; (Q#) qualification round; (P#) preliminary round; (DNQ) did not qualify; (A) absent; (Z#) Davis/Fed Cup Zonal Group (with number indication) or (PO) play-off; (G) gold, (S) silver or (B) bronze Olympic/Paralympic medal; (NMS) not a Masters tournament; (NTI) not a Tier I tournament; (P) postponed; (NH) not held; (SR) strike rate (events won / competed); (W–L) win–loss record.
To avoid confusion and double counting, these charts are updated at the conclusion of a tournament or when the player's participation has ended.

Only main-draw results in WTA Tour, Grand Slam tournaments, Billie Jean King Cup (Fed Cup), Hopman Cup and Olympic Games are included in win–loss records.

=== Singles ===
Tournament	1999	2000	2001	2002	2003	2004	2005	2006	2007	2008	2009	2010	2011	2012	...	2020	2021	SR	W–L	Win %
Grand Slam tournaments
Australian Open	A	1R	4R	SF	SF	F	A	SF	SF	A	A	3R	W	SF		A	A	1 / 10	43–9	83%
French Open	A	1R	F	3R	F	A	4R	SF	A	A	A	A	2R	A		A	A	0 / 7	23–7	77%
Wimbledon	4R	2R	QF	2R	SF	A	4R	SF	A	A	A	QF	A	4R		NH	A	0 / 9	28–9	76%
US Open	3R	2R	QF	4R	F	A	W	A	A	A	W	W	A	2R		1R	A	3 / 10	38–7	84%
Win–loss	5–2	2–4	17–4	11–4	22–4	6–1	13–2	14–3	5–1	0–0	7–0	13–2	8–1	9–3		0–1	0–0	4 / 36	132–32	80%
Year-end championship
WTA Finals	DNQ	QF	SF	W	W	DNQ	RR	SF	did not qualify			W	did not qualify			NH	DNQ	3 / 7	19–7	73%
National representation
Summer Olympics	NH	A	not held			A	not held			A	not held			QF		NH	A	0 / 1	3–1	75%
Fed Cup	A	SF	W	QF	SF	QF	PO	F	A	A	A	PO	SF	A		A	A	1 / 7	21–3	88%
WTA 1000 + former^{†} tournaments
Indian Wells Open	A	4R	F	2R	W	3R	W	A	A	A	A	3R	4R	A		NH	1R	2 / 9	24–6	80%
Miami Open	A	4R	4R	QF	SF	A	W	2R	4R	A	A	W	QF	3R		NH	A	2 / 10	31–8	81%
Berlin / Madrid Open (Note: In 2009, the Berlin Open was replaced by the Madrid Open. The Premier Mandatory tournaments were reclassified as WTA 1000 tournaments in 2021.)	A	A	1R	2R	F	3R	3R	A	A	A	A	A	A	A		NH	A	0 / 5	7–4	64%
Italian Open	A	A	2R	SF	W	A	A	3R	A	A	A	A	A	A		A	A	1 / 4	9–3	75%
Canadian Open	A	A	A	3R	3R	A	W	2R	A	A	3R	QF	2R	A		NH	A	1 / 7	10–6	63%
Cincinnati Open	not held					not Premier 5					QF	W	A	A		A	A	1 / 2	8–1	89%
Southern California Open^{†}	Tier II					A	QF	F	A	not held		Premier			not held			0 / 2	6–2	75%
Zurich Open^{†}	A	A	A	QF	SF	A	A	A	A	TII	not held							0 / 2	4–2	67%
Career statistics
	1999	2000	2001	2002	2003	2004	2005	2006	2007	2008	2009	2010	2011	2012	...	2020	2021	Career		
Tournaments	8	17	22	21	21	6	17	14	5	0	4	11	8	7		3	2	Career total: 166		
Titles	1	2	3	4	9	2	9	3	1	0	1	5	1	0		0	0	Career total: 41		
Finals	2	3	6	6	15	3	9	5	2	0	1	5	3	0		0	0	Career total: 60		
Hard win–loss	6–2	16–8	30–10	35–10	59–7	9–2	49–4	23–6	11–2	0–0	13–3	32–4	21–5	11–4		0–3	0–2	31 / 103	315–72	81%
Clay win–loss	2–2	1–2	15–5	10–3	17–2	3–0	8–3	11–3	0–1	0–0	0–0	2–1	1–1	0–0		0–0	0–0	3 / 26	70–23	75%
Grass win–loss	3–1	2–2	7–2	2–2	9–1	0–0	8–1	6–2	0–0	0–0	0–0	6–2	1–1	9–2		0–0	0–0	2 / 19	53–16	77%
Carpet win–loss	5–2	11–5	6–1	4–2	5–2	8–0	2–1	3–1	3–1	0–0	Discontinued							5 / 18	47–15	76%
Overall win–loss	16–7	30–17	58–18	51–17	90–12	20–2	67–9	43–12	14–4	0–0	13–3	40–7	23–7	20–6		0–3	0–2	41 / 166	485–126	80%
Win %	70%	64%	76%	75%	88%	91%	88%	78%	78%	–	81%	85%	77%	77%		0%	0%	Career total: 79%		
Year-end ranking	47	18	5	4	2	22	2	5	–	–	18	3	13	–		1023	1118	$24,545,194		

=== Doubles ===
Tournament	1999	2000	2001	2002	2003	2004	2005	2006	2007	2008	2009	2010	2011	2012	...	2021	SR	W–L	Win %
Grand Slam tournaments
Australian Open	A	1R	3R	3R	QF	A	A	A	A	A	A	A	A	A		A	0 / 4	7–4	63%
French Open	A	1R	3R	A	W	A	A	A	A	A	A	A	A	A		A	1 / 3	8–2	80%
Wimbledon	A	2R	F	A	W	A	A	A	A	A	A	A	A	A		A	1 / 3	12–2	86%
US Open	A	3R	A	QF	2R	A	A	A	A	A	A	A	A	1R		A	0 / 4	6–4	60%
Win–loss	0–0	3–4	9–3	5–2	16–2	0–0	0–0	0–0	0–0	0–0	0–0	0–0	0–0	0–1		0–0	2 / 14	33–12	73%
Year-end championship
WTA Finals	did not qualify				F	did not qualify											0 / 1	1–1	50%
WTA 1000 + former^{†} tournaments
Indian Wells Open	A	A	1R	A	F	A	A	A	A	A	A	A	A	A		A	0 / 2	4–2	67%
Miami Open	A	1R	1R	A	QF	A	A	2R	1R	A	A	2R	A	A		A	0 / 6	4–6	40%
Berlin / Madrid Open	A	A	A	A	F	A	A	A	A	A	not held					500	0 / 1	3–1	75%
Italian Open	A	A	1R	A	A	A	A	A	A	A	A	A	A	A		A	0 / 1	0–1	0%
Canadian Open	A	A	A	QF	A	A	A	A	A	A	A	A	A	A		A	0 / 1	2–1	67%
Cincinnati Open	not held					not Premier 5					1R	A	A	A		A	0 / 1	0–1	0%
Zurich Open^{†}	A	A	A	SF	W	A	A	A	A	A	TII	not held					1 / 2	6–1	86%
Career statistics
	1999	2000	2001	2002	2003	2004	2005	2006	2007	2008	2009	2010	2011	2012	...	2021	Career		
Tournaments	5	12	14	11	13	1	1	1	1	0	2	2	0	1		1	Career total: 65		
Titles	1	1	0	2	7	0	0	0	0	0	0	0	0	0		0	Career total: 11		
Finals	1	3	4	2	10	0	0	0	0	0	0	0	0	0		0	Career total: 20		
Overall win–loss	5–4	17–11	25–13	17–8	47–5	1–1	2–1	1–2	0–1	0–0	1–2	1–2	0–0	0–1		0–1	11 / 65	117–52	69%
Year-end ranking	150	48	15	24	4	–	–	–	–	–	–	–	–	–		–			

== Significant finals ==
=== Grand Slams ===
==== Singles: 8 (4 titles, 4 runner-ups) ====
Result	Year	Championship	Surface	Opponent	Score
Loss	2001	French Open	Clay	(United States) Jennifer Capriati	6–1, 4–6, 10–12
Loss	2003	French Open	Clay	(Belgium) Justine Henin	0–6, 4–6
Loss	2003	US Open	Hard	(Belgium) Justine Henin	5–7, 1–6
Loss	2004	Australian Open	Hard	(Belgium) Justine Henin	3–6, 6–4, 3–6
Win	2005	US Open	Hard	(France) Mary Pierce	6–3, 6–1
Win	2009	US Open (2)	Hard	(Denmark) Caroline Wozniacki	7–5, 6–3
Win	2010	US Open (3)	Hard	(Russia) Vera Zvonareva	6–2, 6–1
Win	2011	Australian Open	Hard	(China) Li Na	3–6, 6–3, 6–3

==== Doubles: 3 (2 titles, 1 runner-up) ====
Result	Year	Championship	Surface	Partner	Opponents	Score
Loss	2001	Wimbledon	Grass	(Japan) Ai Sugiyama	(United States) Lisa Raymond (Australia) Rennae Stubbs	4–6, 3–6
Win	2003	French Open	Clay	(Japan) Ai Sugiyama	(Spain) Virginia Ruano Pascual (Argentina) Paola Suárez	6–7^{(5–7)}, 6–2, 9–7
Win	2003	Wimbledon	Grass	(Japan) Ai Sugiyama	(Spain) Virginia Ruano Pascual (Argentina) Paola Suárez	6–4, 6–4

==== Mixed doubles: 1 (1 runner-up) ====
Result	Year	Championship	Surface	Partner	Opponents	Score
Loss	2000	Wimbledon	Grass	(Australia) Lleyton Hewitt	(United States) Kimberly Po (United States) Donald Johnson	4–6, 6–7^{(3–7)}

Sources: ITF profile and WTA profile

=== WTA Finals ===
==== Singles: 3 finals (3 titles) ====
Result	Year	Tournament	Surface	Opponent	Score
Win	2002	WTA Finals, Los Angeles, United States	Hard (i)	(United States) Serena Williams	7–5, 6–3
Win	2003	WTA Finals, Los Angeles, United States (2)	Hard (i)	(France) Amélie Mauresmo	6–2, 6–0
Win	2010	WTA Finals, Doha, Qatar (3)	Hard	(Denmark) Caroline Wozniacki	6–3, 5–7, 6–3

==== Doubles: 1 final (1 runner-up) ====
Result	Year	Tournament	Surface	Partner	Opponent	Score
Loss	2003	WTA Finals, Los Angeles, United States	Hard (i)	(Japan) Ai Sugiyama	(Spain) Virginia Ruano Pascual (Argentina) Paola Suárez	4–6, 6–3, 3–6

=== WTA 1000 ===
==== Singles: 10 finals (7 titles, 3 runner-ups) ====
Result	Year	Tournament	Surface	Opponent	Score
Loss	2001	Indian Wells Open	Hard	(United States) Serena Williams	6–4, 4–6, 2–6
Win	2003	Indian Wells Open	Hard	(United States) Lindsay Davenport	6–4, 7–5
Loss	2003	German Open	Clay	(Belgium) Justine Henin	4–6, 6–4, 5–7
Win	2003	Italian Open	Clay	(France) Amélie Mauresmo	3–6, 7–6^{(7–3)}, 6–0
Win	2005	Indian Wells (2)	Hard	(United States) Lindsay Davenport	6–4, 4–6, 6–2
Win	2005	Miami Open	Hard	(Russia) Maria Sharapova	6–3, 7–5
Win	2005	Canadian Open	Hard	(Belgium) Justine Henin	7–5, 6–1
Loss	2006	Southern California Open	Hard	(Russia) Maria Sharapova	5–7, 5–7
Win	2010	Miami Open (2)	Hard	(United States) Venus Williams	6–2, 6–1
Win	2010	Cincinnati Open	Hard	(Russia) Maria Sharapova	2–6, 7–6^{(7–4)}, 6–2

==== Doubles: 3 finals (1 title, 2 runner-ups) ====
Result	Year	Tournament	Surface	Partner	Opponent	Score
Loss	2003	Indian Wells Open	Hard	(Japan) Ai Sugiyama	(United States) Lindsay Davenport (United States) Lisa Raymond	6–3, 4–6, 1–6
Loss	2003	German Open	Clay	(Japan) Ai Sugiyama	(Spain) Virginia Ruano Pascual (Argentina) Paola Suárez	3–6, 6–4, 4–6
Win	2003	Zurich Open	Hard (i)	(Japan) Ai Sugiyama	(Spain) Virginia Ruano Pascual (Argentina) Paola Suárez	7–6^{(7–3)}, 6–2

== WTA Tour finals ==
=== Singles: 60 (41 titles, 19 runner-ups) ===
Legend Grand Slam tournaments (4–4) Finals (3–0) WTA 1000 (Tier I / Premier 5 / Premier M) (7–3) WTA 500 (Tier II / Premier) (18–10) WTA 250 (Tier III / Tier IV / Tier V / International) (9–2)	Finals by surface Hard (31–11) Grass (2–1) Clay (3–3) Carpet (5–4)

Result	W–L	Date	Tournament	Tier	Surface	Opponent	Score
Win	1–0	Sep 1999	Luxembourg Open, Luxembourg	Tier III	Carpet (i)	(Belgium) Dominique Monami	6–2, 6–2
Loss	1–1	Oct 1999	Bratislava Open, Slovakia	Tier V	Hard	(France) Amélie Mauresmo	3–6, 3–6
Win	2–1	Jan 2000	Hobart International, Australia	Tier IV	Hard	(United States) Chanda Rubin	2–6, 6–2, 6–2
Loss	2–2	Oct 2000	Stuttgart Open, Germany	Tier II	Carpet (i)	(Switzerland) Martina Hingis	0–6, 3–6
Win	3–2	Oct 2000	Sparkassen Cup, Germany	Tier II	Carpet (i)	(Russia) Elena Likhovtseva	7–6^{(8–6)}, 4–6, 6–4
Loss	3–3	Mar 2001	Indian Wells Open United States	Tier I	Hard	(United States) Serena Williams	6–4, 4–6, 2–6
Loss	3–4	May 2001	French Open, France	Grand Slam	Clay	(United States) Jennifer Capriati	6–1, 4–6, 10–12
Loss	3–5	Jun 2001	Rosmalen Championships, Netherlands	Tier III	Grass	(Belgium) Justine Henin	4–6, 6–3, 3–6
Win	4–5	Jul 2001	Stanford Classic, United States	Tier II	Hard	(United States) Lindsay Davenport	6–4, 6–7^{(5–7)}, 6–1
Win	5–5	Sep 2001	Sparkassen Cup, Germany (2)	Tier II	Carpet (i)	(Bulgaria) Magdalena Maleeva	6–1, 6–1
Win	6–5	Oct 2001	Luxembourg Open, Luxembourg (2)	Tier III	Hard (i)	(United States) Lisa Raymond	6–2, 6–2
Win	7–5	Apr 2002	WTA Hamburg, Germany	Tier II	Clay	(United States) Venus Williams	1–6, 6–3, 6–4
Loss	7–6	Jul 2002	Stanford Classic, United States	Tier II	Hard	(United States) Venus Williams	3–6, 3–6
Loss	7–7	Sep 2002	Princess Cup, Japan	Tier II	Hard	(United States) Serena Williams	6–2, 3–6, 3–6
Win	8–7	Oct 2002	Stuttgart Open, Germany	Tier II	Hard	(Slovakia) Daniela Hantuchová	4–6, 6–3, 6–4
Win	9–7	Oct 2002	Luxembourg Open, Luxembourg (3)	Tier III	Hard (i)	(Bulgaria) Magdalena Maleeva	6–1, 6–2
Win	10–7	Nov 2002	WTA Tour Championships, United States	Tour Finals	Hard	(United States) Serena Williams	7–5, 6–3
Win	11–7	Jan 2003	Sydney International, Australia	Tier II	Hard	(United States) Lindsay Davenport	6–4, 6–3
Loss	11–8	Feb 2003	Diamond Games, Belgium	Tier II	Carpet (i)	(United States) Venus Williams	2–6, 4–6
Loss	11–9	Mar 2003	State Farm Classic, United States	Tier II	Hard	(Japan) Ai Sugiyama	6–3, 5–7, 4–6
Win	12–9	Mar 2003	Indian Wells Open, United States	Tier I	Hard	(United States) Lindsay Davenport	6–4, 7–5
Loss	12–10	May 2003	German Open, Germany	Tier I	Clay	(Belgium) Justine Henin	4–6, 6–4, 5–7
Win	13–10	May 2003	Italian Open, Italy	Tier I	Clay	(France) Amélie Mauresmo	3–6, 7–6^{(7–3)}, 6–0
Loss	13–11	May 2003	French Open, France	Grand Slam	Clay	(Belgium) Justine Henin	0–6, 4–6
Win	14–11	Jun 2003	Rosmalen Championships, Netherlands	Tier III	Grass	(Belgium) Justine Henin	6–7^{(4–7)}, 3–0, ret.
Win	15–11	Jul 2003	Stanford Classic, United States (2)	Tier II	Hard	(United States) Jennifer Capriati	4–6, 6–4, 6–2
Loss	15–12	Jul 2003	Southern California Open, United States	Tier II	Hard	(Belgium) Justine Henin	6–3, 2–6, 3–6
Win	16–12	Aug 2003	LA Championships, United States	Tier II	Hard	(United States) Lindsay Davenport	6–1, 3–6, 6–1
Loss	16–13	Aug 2003	US Open, United States	Grand Slam	Hard	(Belgium) Justine Henin	5–7, 1–6
Win	17–13	Oct 2003	Stuttgart Open, Germany (2)	Tier II	Hard	(Belgium) Justine Henin	5–7, 6–4, 6–2
Win	18–13	Oct 2003	Luxembourg Open, Luxembourg (4)	Tier III	Hard	(United States) Chanda Rubin	6–2, 7–5
Win	19–13	Nov 2003	WTA Tour Championships, United States (2)	Tour Finals	Hard	(France) Amélie Mauresmo	6–2, 6–0
Loss	19–14	Jan 2004	Australian Open, Melbourne	Grand Slam	Hard	(Belgium) Justine Henin	3–6, 6–4, 3–6
Win	20–14	Feb 2004	Open GDF Suez, France	Tier II	Carpet (i)	(France) Mary Pierce	6–2, 6–1
Win	21–14	Feb 2004	Diamond Games, Belgium	Tier II	Carpet (i)	(Italy) Silvia Farina Elia	6–3, 6–0
Win	22–14	Mar 2005	Indian Wells Open, United States	Tier I	Hard	(United States) Lindsay Davenport	6–4, 4–6, 6–2
Win	23–14	Mar 2005	Miami Open, United States	Tier I	Hard	(Russia) Maria Sharapova	6–3, 7–5
Win	24–14	Jun 2005	Eastbourne International, United Kingdom	Tier II	Grass	(Russia) Vera Dushevina	7–5, 6–0
Win	25–14	Aug 2005	Stanford Classic, United States (3)	Tier II	Hard	(United States) Venus Williams	7–5, 6–2
Win	26–14	Aug 2005	LA Championships, United States (2)	Tier II	Hard	(Slovakia) Daniela Hantuchová	6–4, 6–1
Win	27–14	Aug 2005	Canadian Open, Canada	Tier I	Hard	(Belgium) Justine Henin	7–5, 6–1
Win	28–14	Sep 2005	US Open, United States	Grand Slam	Hard	(France) Mary Pierce	6–3, 6–1
Win	29–14	Oct 2005	Luxembourg Open, Luxembourg (5)	Tier II	Hard	(Germany) Anna-Lena Grönefeld	6–2, 6–4
Win	30–14	Oct 2005	Gaz de France Stars, Belgium	Tier III	Hard	(Italy) Francesca Schiavone	6–2, 6–3
Loss	30–15	Feb 2006	Diamond Games, Belgium	Tier II	Carpet (i)	(France) Amélie Mauresmo	6–3, 3–6, 3–6
Win	31–15	May 2006	Warsaw Open, Poland	Tier II	Clay	(Russia) Svetlana Kuznetsova	7–5, 6–2
Win	32–15	Jul 2006	Stanford Classic, United States (4)	Tier II	Hard	(Switzerland) Patty Schnyder	6–4, 6–2
Loss	32–16	Aug 2006	Southern California Open, United States	Tier I	Hard	(Russia) Maria Sharapova	5–7, 5–7
Win	33–16	Nov 2006	Gaz de France Stars, Belgium (2)	Tier III	Hard	(Estonia) Kaia Kanepi	6–3, 3–6, 6–4
Win	34–16	Jan 2007	Sydney International, Australia (2)	Tier II	Hard	(Serbia) Jelena Janković	4–6, 7–6^{(7–1)}, 6–4
Loss	34–17	Feb 2007	Diamond Games, Belgium	Tier II	Carpet (i)	(France) Amélie Mauresmo	4–6, 6–7^{(4–7)}
Win	35–17	Sep 2009	US Open, United States (2)	Grand Slam	Hard	(Denmark) Caroline Wozniacki	7–5, 6–3
Win	36–17	Jan 2010	Brisbane International, Australia	International	Hard	(Belgium) Justine Henin	6–3, 4–6, 7–6^{(8–6)}
Win	37–17	Apr 2010	Miami Open, United States (2)	Premier M	Hard	(United States) Venus Williams	6–2, 6–1
Win	38–17	Aug 2010	Cincinnati Open, United States	Premier 5	Hard	(Russia) Maria Sharapova	2–6, 7–6^{(7–4)}, 6–2
Win	39–17	Sep 2010	US Open, United States (3)	Grand Slam	Hard	(Russia) Vera Zvonareva	6–2, 6–1
Win	40–17	Oct 2010	WTA Tour Championships, Qatar (3)	Tour Finals	Hard	(Denmark) Caroline Wozniacki	6–3, 5–7, 6–3
Loss	40–18	Jan 2011	Sydney International, Australia	Premier	Hard	(China) Li Na	6–7^{(3–7)}, 3–6
Win	41–18	Jan 2011	Australian Open, Australia	Grand Slam	Hard	(China) Li Na	3–6, 6–3, 6–3
Loss	41–19	Feb 2011	Open GDF Suez, France	Premier	Hard (i)	(Czech Republic) Petra Kvitová	4–6, 3–6

=== Doubles: 20 (11 titles, 9 runner-ups) ===
Legend Grand Slam tournaments (2–1) Finals (0–1) WTA 1000 (Tier I) (1–2) WTA 500 (Tier II) (5–3) WTA 250 (Tier III / Tier IV / Tier V) (3–2)	Finals by surface Hard (7–5) Grass (1–2) Clay (2–1) Carpet (1–1)

Result	W–L	Date	Tournament	Tier	Surface	Partner	Opponents	Score
Win	1–0	Oct 1999	Bratislava Open, Slovakia	Tier V	Hard	(Belgium) Laurence Courtois	(Belarus) Olga Barabanschikova (United States) Lilia Osterloh	6–2, 3–6, 7–5
Loss	1–1	Jan 2000	Hobart International, Australia	Tier IV	Hard	(Australia) Alicia Molik	(Italy) Rita Grande (France) Émilie Loit	2–6, 6–2, 3–6
Win	2–1	May 2000	Belgian Open, Belgium	Tier V	Clay	(Belgium) Sabine Appelmans	(United States) Jennifer Hopkins (Slovenia) Petra Rampre	6–1, 6–1
Loss	2–2	Oct 2000	Sparkassen Cup, Germany	Tier II	Carpet	(Belgium) Laurence Courtois	(Spain) Arantxa Sánchez-Vicario (France) Anne-Gaëlle Sidot	7–6^{(8–6)}, 5–7, 3–6
Loss	2–3	Mar 2001	State Farm Classic, United States	Tier II	Hard	(United States) Meghann Shaughnessy	(United States) Lisa Raymond (Australia) Rennae Stubbs	Walkover
Loss	2–4	Jun 2001	Rosmalen Championships, Netherlands	Tier III	Grass	(Netherlands) Miriam Oremans	(Romania) Ruxandra Dragomir (Russia) Nadia Petrova	6–7^{(5–7)}, 7–6^{(7–4)}, 4–6
Loss	2–5	Jul 2001	Wimbledon, United Kingdom	Grand Slam	Grass	(Japan) Ai Sugiyama	(United States) Lisa Raymond (Australia) Rennae Stubbs	4–6, 3–6
Loss	2–6	Sep 2001	Princess Cup, Japan	Tier II	Hard	(Japan) Ai Sugiyama	(Zimbabwe) Cara Black (South Africa) Liezel Huber	1–6, 3–6
Win	3–6	Aug 2002	LA Championships, United States	Tier II	Hard	(Serbia and Montenegro) Jelena Dokić	(Slovakia) Daniela Hantuchová (Japan) Ai Sugiyama	6–3, 6–3
Win	4–6	Oct 2002	Luxembourg Open, Luxembourg	Tier III	Hard	(Slovakia) Janette Husárová	(Czech Republic) Květa Peschke (Germany) Barbara Rittner	4–6, 6–3, 7–5
Win	5–6	Jan 2003	Sydney International, Australia	Tier II	Hard	(Japan) Ai Sugiyama	(Spain) Conchita Martínez (Australia) Rennae Stubbs	6–3, 6–3
Win	6–6	Feb 2003	Belgian Open, Belgium (2)	Tier II	Carpet	(Japan) Ai Sugiyama	(France) Nathalie Dechy (France) Émilie Loit	6–2, 6–0
Win	7–6	Mar 2003	State Farm Classic, United States	Tier II	Hard	(Japan) Ai Sugiyama	(United States) Lindsay Davenport (United States) Lisa Raymond	6–1, 6–4
Loss	7–7	Mar 2003	Indian Wells Open, United States	Tier I	Hard	(Japan) Ai Sugiyama	(United States) Lindsay Davenport (United States) Lisa Raymond	6–3, 4–6, 1–6
Loss	7–8	May 2003	German Open, Germany	Tier I	Clay	(Japan) Ai Sugiyama	(Spain) Virginia Ruano Pascual (Argentina) Paola Suárez	3–6, 6–4, 4–6
Win	8–8	Jun 2003	French Open, France	Grand Slam	Clay	(Japan) Ai Sugiyama	(Spain) Virginia Ruano Pascual (Argentina) Paola Suárez	6–7, 6–2, 9–7
Win	9–8	Jul 2003	Wimbledon, United Kingdom	Grand Slam	Grass	(Japan) Ai Sugiyama	(Spain) Virginia Ruano Pascual (Argentina) Paola Suárez	6–4, 6–4
Win	10–8	Aug 2003	Southern California Open, United States	Tier II	Hard	(Japan) Ai Sugiyama	(United States) Lindsay Davenport (United States) Lisa Raymond	6–4, 7–5
Win	11–8	Oct 2003	Zurich Open, Switzerland	Tier I	Hard	(Japan) Ai Sugiyama	(Spain) Virginia Ruano Pascual (Argentina) Paola Suárez	7–6, 6–2
Loss	11–9	Nov 2003	WTA Finals, United States	Finals	Hard	(Japan) Ai Sugiyama	(Spain) Virginia Ruano Pascual (Argentina) Paola Suárez	4–6, 6–3, 3–6

== ITF Circuit finals ==
=== Singles: 4 (3 titles, 1 runner-up) ===
Legend
$25,000 tournaments
$10,000 tournaments

Result	W–L	Date	Tournament	Tier	Surface	Opponent	Score
Win	1.	Jun 1998	ITF Brussels, Belgium	10,000	Clay	(Czech Republic) Denisa Sobotková	7–6, 6–1
Win	2.	Aug 1998	ITF Koksijde, Belgium	10,000	Clay	(Spain) Lourdes Domínguez Lino	6–3, 6–4
Win	3.	Feb 1999	ITF Sheffield, United Kingdom	10,000	Hard (i)	(Netherlands) Kim de Weille	6–3, 6–1
Loss	1.	Mar 1999	ITF Reims, France	25,000	Clay	(Belgium) Justine Henin	4–6, 4–6

=== Doubles: 3 titles ===
Legend
$25,000 tournaments
$10,000 tournaments

Result	W–L	Date	Tournament	Tier	Surface	Partner	Opponents	Score
Win	1.	Jul 1998	ITF Brussels, Belgium	10,000	Clay	(Belgium) Stephanie Devillé	(Russia) Maria Boboedova (Latvia) Elena Krutko	6–1, 7–5
Win	2.	Aug 1998	ITF Brussels, Belgium	10,000	Clay	(Belgium) Cindy Schuurmans	(Spain) Lourdes Domínguez Lino (Argentina) Luciana Masante	7–6, 7–5
Win	3.	Nov 1998	ITF Ramat Hasharon, Israel	25,000	Hard	(Belgium) Justine Henin	(Belarus) Olga Glouschenko (Belarus) Tatiana Poutchek	6–2, 6–0

== Billie Jean King Cup ==
=== Finals: 1 title ===
Result	Date	Tournament	Surface	Partners	Opponents	Score
Win	Nov 2001	Fed Cup, Spain	Clay	(Belgium) Justine Henin (Belgium) Els Callens (Belgium) Laurence Courtois	(Russia) Nadia Petrova (Russia) Elena Dementieva (Russia) Elena Likhovtseva (Russia) Elena Bovina	2–1

== Junior Grand Slam finals ==
=== Singles: 1 (1 runner-up) ===
Result	Year	Championship	Surface	Opponent	Score
Loss	1998	Wimbledon	Grass	(Slovenia) Katarina Srebotnik	5–7, 3–6

=== Doubles: 3 (2 titles, 1 runner-up) ===
Result	Year	Championship	Surface	Partner	Opponents	Score
Win	1998	French Open	Clay	(Australia) Jelena Dokic	(Russia) Elena Dementieva (Russia) Nadia Petrova	6–4, 7–6
Win	1998	US Open	Hard	(Denmark) Eva Dyrberg	(Australia) Jelena Dokic (Australia) Evie Dominikovic	7–6, 6–4
Loss	1999	French Open	Clay	(Germany) Mia Buric	(Italy) Flavia Pennetta (Italy) Roberta Vinci	5–7, 7–5, 4–6

== WTA Tour career earnings ==
Year	Grand Slam titles (Note: Includes singles, doubles and mixed doubles titles.)	WTA titles	Total titles	Earnings ($)	Money list rank
1999	0	1	1	135,006	65
2000	0	2	2	418,503	23
2001	0	3	3	1,335,659	6
2002	0	4	4	1,754,376	4
2003	0	9	9	4,466,345	1
2004	0	2	2	787,366	15
2005	1	8	9	3,983,654	1
2006	0	3	3	1,463,492	6
2007	0	1	1	414,159	38
2008	DNP
2009	1	0	1	1,632,560	10
2010	1	4	5	5,035,060	1
2011	1	0	0	2,325,741	9
2012	0	0	0	684,683	21
2013–19	DNP
Career	4	37	41	24,527,039	12

*As of October 10, 2021

== Top 10 Wins ==
- Clijsters has a 84–63 record against players who were, at the time the match was played, ranked in the top 10.

Season	1999	2000	2001	2002	2003	2004	2005	2006	2007	2008	2009	2010	2011	2012	2020	Total
Wins	1	7	3	12	21	1	13	6	1	0	5	10	2	2	0	84

#	Player	vsRank	Event	Surface	Round	Score
1999
1.	(South Africa) Amanda Coetzer	10	Wimbledon, United Kingdom	Grass	3R	6–2, 6–4
2000
2.	(France) Nathalie Tauziat	5	Fed Cup, Moscow, Russia	Carpet (i)	RR	6–1, 6–4
3.	(France) Nathalie Tauziat	7	Wimbledon, United Kingdom	Grass	1R	6–3, 3–6, 6–2
4.	(Spain) Conchita Martínez	6	Filderstadt, Germany	Hard (i)	QF	7–5, 7–5
5.	(France) Nathalie Tauziat	10	Filderstadt, Germany	Hard (i)	SF	3–6, 6–4, 6–1
6.	(Spain) Arantxa Sánchez Vicario	9	Leipzig, Germany	Carpet (i)	3R	7–5, 6–1
7.	(Russia) Anna Kournikova	10	Leipzig, Germany	Carpet (i)	SF	6–2, 6–3
8.	(Spain) Arantxa Sánchez Vicario	8	WTA Tour Championships, New York, US	Carpet (i)	1R	7–5, 6–4
2001
9.	(Switzerland) Martina Hingis	1	Indian Wells, US	Hard	SF	6–2, 2–6, 6–1
10.	(United States) Lindsay Davenport	4	Stanford, US	Hard	F	6–4, 6–7^{(5–7)}, 6–1
11.	(France) Nathalie Tauziat	9	New Haven, US	Hard	F	6–2, 6–2
2002
12.	(Belgium) Justine Henin	7	Sydney, Australia	Hard	QF	7–6^{(7–5)}, 6–2
13.	(Belgium) Justine Henin	8	Melbourne, Australia	Hard	QF	6–2, 6–3
14.	(Federal Republic of Yugoslavia) Jelena Dokic	9	Hamburg, Germany	Clay	SF	6–4, 4–4 RET
15.	(United States) Venus Williams	1	Hamburg, Germany	Clay	F	1–6, 6–3, 6–4
16.	(France) Sandrine Testud	10	Rome, Italy	Clay	QF	6–1, 6–3
17.	(United States) Lindsay Davenport	9	Stanford, US	Hard	SF	4–6, 6–4, 6–2
18.	(Federal Republic of Yugoslavia) Jelena Dokic	4	Tokyo, Japan	Hard	SF	5–7, 6–2, 6–3
19.	(United States) Lindsay Davenport	7	Filderstadt, Germany	Hard (i)	QF	4–6, 6–3, 6–4
20.	(France) Amélie Mauresmo	4	Filderstadt, Germany	Hard (i)	SF	3–6, 6–3, 7–5
21.	(Belgium) Justine Henin	4	WTA Tour Championships, Los Angeles, US	Hard (i)	QF	6–2, 6–1
22.	(United States) Venus Williams	2	WTA Tour Championships, Los Angeles, US	Hard (i)	SF	5–0 RET
23.	(United States) Serena Williams	1	WTA Tour Championships, Los Angeles, US	Hard (i)	F	7–5, 6–3
2003
24.	(Belgium) Justine Henin	5	Sydney, Australia	Hard	SF	6–2, 6–3
25.	(Belgium) Justine Henin	4	Antwerp, Belgium	Carpet (i)	SF	6–2, 7–6^{(7–3)}
26.	(United States) Lindsay Davenport	7	Indian Wells, US	Hard	F	6–4, 7–5
27.	(Federal Republic of Yugoslavia) Jelena Dokic	9	Miami, US	Hard	QF	6–2, 6–0
28.	(Slovakia) Daniela Hantuchová	9	Berlin, Germany	Clay	QF	6–0, 6–3
29.	(United States) Jennifer Capriati	7	Berlin, Germany	Clay	SF	6–4, 6–7^{(2–7)}, 6–4
30.	(France) Amélie Mauresmo	6	Rome, Italy	Clay	F	3–6, 7–6^{(7–3)}, 6–0
31.	(Belgium) Justine Henin	3	's-Hertogenbosch, Netherlands	Grass	F	6–7^{(4–7)}, 3–0 RET
32.	(United States) Jennifer Capriati	7	Stanford, US	Hard	F	4–6, 6–4, 6–2
33.	(United States) Lindsay Davenport	5	San Diego, US	Hard	SF	6–3, 6–3
34.	(United States) Lindsay Davenport	4	Los Angeles, US	Hard	F	6–1, 3–6, 6–1
35.	(France) Amélie Mauresmo	6	New York, US	Hard	QF	6–1, 6–4
36.	(United States) Lindsay Davenport	4	New York, US	Hard	SF	6–2, 6–3
37.	(France) Amélie Mauresmo	7	Filderstadt, Germany	Hard (i)	QF	6–4, 6–3
38.	(Belgium) Justine Henin	2	Filderstadt, Germany	Hard (i)	F	5–7, 6–4, 6–2
39.	(United States) Chanda Rubin	10	Luxembourg, Luxembourg	Hard (i)	F	6–2, 7–5
40.	(France) Amélie Mauresmo	6	WTA Tour Championships, Los Angeles, US	Hard (i)	RR	3–6, 6–4, 6–4
41.	(Russia) Elena Dementieva	9	WTA Tour Championships, Los Angeles, US	Hard (i)	RR	6–2, 6–2
42.	(United States) Chanda Rubin	10	WTA Tour Championships, Los Angeles, US	Hard (i)	RR	6–4, 6–4
43.	(United States) Jennifer Capriati	5	WTA Tour Championships, Los Angeles, US	Hard (i)	SF	4–6, 6–3, 6–0
44.	(France) Amélie Mauresmo	6	WTA Tour Championships, Los Angeles, US	Hard (i)	F	6–2, 6–0
2004
45.	(Russia) Anastasia Myskina	7	Melbourne, Australia	Hard	QF	6–2, 7–6^{(11–9)}
2005
46.	(Russia) Elena Dementieva	5	Indian Wells, US	Hard	SF	6–4, 6–2
47.	(United States) Lindsay Davenport	1	Indian Wells, US	Hard	F	6–4, 4–6, 6–2
48.	(Russia) Anastasia Myskina	6	Miami, US	Hard	4R	6–3, 6–4
49.	(Russia) Elena Dementieva	5	Miami, US	Hard	QF	6–2, 6–1
50.	(France) Amélie Mauresmo	2	Miami, US	Hard	SF	6–1, 6–0
51.	(Russia) Maria Sharapova	3	Miami, US	Hard	F	6–3, 7–5
52.	(Russia) Svetlana Kuznetsova	5	Eastbourne, United Kingdom	Grass	SF	6–4, 3–6, 6–4
53.	(United States) Venus Williams	10	Stanford, US	Carpet (i)	F	7–5, 6–2
54.	(Russia) Nadia Petrova	9	Los Angeles, US	Hard	QF	6–4, 6–2
55.	(Belgium) Justine Henin	5	Toronto, Canada	Hard	F	7–5, 6–1
56.	(United States) Venus Williams	10	New York, US	Hard	QF	4–6, 7–5, 6–1
57.	(Russia) Maria Sharapova	2	New York, US	Hard	SF	6–2, 6–7^{(4–7)}, 6–3
58.	(Russia) Elena Dementieva	7	WTA Tour Championships, Los Angeles, US	Hard (i)	RR	6–2, 6–3
2006
59.	(Russia) Elena Dementieva	8	Antwerp, Belgium	Carpet (i)	SF	5–7, 6–1, 6–2
60.	(Russia) Elena Dementieva	9	Warsaw, Poland	Clay	SF	7–5, 6–4
61.	(Russia) Svetlana Kuznetsova	10	Warsaw, Poland	Clay	F	7–5, 6–2
62.	(Switzerland) Patty Schnyder	8	Stanford, US	Hard	F	6–4, 6–2
63.	(Russia) Elena Dementieva	8	WTA Tour Championships, Madrid, Spain	Hard (i)	RR	6–4, 6–0
64.	(Russia) Svetlana Kuznetsova	4	WTA Tour Championships, Madrid, Spain	Hard (i)	RR	6–1, 6–1
2007
65.	(Switzerland) Martina Hingis	7	Melbourne, Australia	Hard	QF	3–6, 6–4, 6–3
2009
66.	(Russia) Svetlana Kuznetsova	6	Cincinnati, US	Hard	3R	6–4, 4–6, 6–2
67.	(Belarus) Victoria Azarenka	9	Toronto, Canada	Hard	2R	7–5, 4–6, 6–1
68.	(United States) Venus Williams	3	New York, US	Hard	4R	6–0, 0–6, 6–4
69.	(United States) Serena Williams	2	New York, US	Hard	SF	6–4, 7–5
70.	(Denmark) Caroline Wozniacki	8	New York, US	Hard	F	7–5, 6–3
2010
71.	(Belarus) Victoria Azarenka	7	Miami, US	Hard	4R	6–4, 6–0
72.	(Australia) Samantha Stosur	10	Miami, US	Hard	QF	6–3, 7–5
73.	(United States) Venus Williams	5	Miami, US	Hard	F	6–2, 6–1
74.	(Australia) Samantha Stosur	6	New York, US	Hard	QF	6–4, 5–7, 6–3
75.	(United States) Venus Williams	4	New York, US	Hard	SF	4–6, 7–6^{(7–2)}, 6–4
76.	(Russia) Vera Zvonareva	8	New York, US	Hard	F	6–2, 6–1
77.	(Serbia) Jelena Janković	8	WTA Tour Championships, Doha, Qatar	Hard	RR	6–2, 6–3
78.	(Belarus) Victoria Azarenka	10	WTA Tour Championships, Doha, Qatar	Hard	RR	6–4, 5–7, 6–1
79.	(Australia) Samantha Stosur	7	WTA Tour Championships, Doha, Qatar	Hard	SF	7–6^{(7–3)}, 6–1
80.	(Denmark) Caroline Wozniacki	1	WTA Tour Championships, Doha, Qatar	Hard	F	6–3, 5–7, 6–3
2011
81.	(Belarus) Victoria Azarenka	10	Sydney, Australia	Hard	QF	6–3, 6–2
82.	(Russia) Vera Zvonareva	2	Melbourne, Australia	Hard	SF	6–3, 6–3
2012
83.	(China) Li Na	6	Melbourne, Australia	Hard	4R	4–6, 7–6^{(8–6)}, 6–4
84.	(Denmark) Caroline Wozniacki	1	Melbourne, Australia	Hard	QF	6–3, 7–6^{(7–4)}

== Longest winning streak ==
=== 21-match win streak (2005) ===
#	Tournament	Category	Start date	Surface	Rd	Opponent	Rank	Score
–	Southern California Open	Tier I	1 August 2005	Hard	QF	(China) Peng Shuai	46	4–6, 4–6
1	Los Angeles Open	Tier II	8 August 2005	Hard	2R	(Croatia) Karolina Šprem	80	6–2, 6–1
2	Los Angeles Open	Tier II	8 August 2005	Hard	3R	(Russia) Dinara Safina (12)	24	6–0, 7–5
3	Los Angeles Open	Tier II	8 August 2005	Hard	QF	(Russia) Nadia Petrova (4)	9	6–4, 6–2
4	Los Angeles Open	Tier II	8 August 2005	Hard	SF	(Italy) Francesca Schiavone (13)	28	6–2, 6–4
5	Los Angeles Open	Tier II	8 August 2005	Hard	F	(Slovakia) Daniela Hantuchová (9)	22	6–4, 6–1
6	Rogers Cup	Tier I	15 August 2005	Hard	2R	(France) Virginie Razzano	39	6–3, 6–0
–	Rogers Cup	Tier I	15 August 2005	Hard	3R	(Serbia and Montenegro) Ana Ivanovic (12)	19	Walkover
7	Rogers Cup	Tier I	15 August 2005	Hard	QF	(Italy) Flavia Pennetta (14)	30	6–0, 6–1
8	Rogers Cup	Tier I	15 August 2005	Hard	SF	(Russia) Anastasia Myskina (9)	14	6–4, 6–1
9	Rogers Cup	Tier I	15 August 2005	Hard	F	(Belgium) Justine Henin-Hardenne (4)	5	7–5, 6–1
10	US Open	Grand Slam	29 August 2005	Hard	1R	(Germany) Martina Müller (Q)	135	6–1, 6–2
11	US Open	Grand Slam	29 August 2005	Hard	2R	(Colombia) Fabiola Zuluaga	58	7–5, 6–0
12	US Open	Grand Slam	29 August 2005	Hard	3R	(Japan) Ai Sugiyama (30)	33	6–1, 6–4
13	US Open	Grand Slam	29 August 2005	Hard	4R	(Venezuela) María Vento-Kabchi	72	6–1, 6–0
14	US Open	Grand Slam	29 August 2005	Hard	QF	(United States) Venus Williams (10)	10	4–6, 7–5, 6–1
15	US Open	Grand Slam	29 August 2005	Hard	SF	(Russia) Maria Sharapova (1)	2	6–2, 6–7^{(4–7)}, 6–3
16	US Open	Grand Slam	29 August 2005	Hard	F	(France) Mary Pierce (12)	12	6–3, 6–1
17	Luxembourg Open	Tier II	26 September 2005	Hard (i)	2R	(Czech Republic) Klára Koukalová	35	6–3, 6–0
18	Luxembourg Open	Tier II	26 September 2005	Hard (i)	QF	(Italy) Francesca Schiavone (6)	21	6–4, 7–5
19	Luxembourg Open	Tier II	26 September 2005	Hard (i)	SF	(France) Nathalie Dechy (4)	15	6–3, 6–1
20	Luxembourg Open	Tier II	26 September 2005	Hard (i)	F	(Germany) Anna-Lena Grönefeld	23	6–2, 6–4
21	Stuttgart Open	Tier II	3 October 2005	Hard (i)	2R	(Croatia) Karolina Šprem (Q)	68	6–3, 6–2
–	Stuttgart Open	Tier II	3 October 2005	Hard (i)	QF	(Russia) Elena Dementieva (5)	8	3–6, 6–3, 2–6
