= Amélie Mauresmo career statistics =

Career finals
Discipline	Type	Won	Lost	Total
Singles	Grand Slam	2	1	3
Singles	Summer Olympics	0	1	1
Singles	WTA Finals (Note: Formerly known as WTA Tour Championships until 2014.)	1	2	3
Singles	WTA 1000 (Note: Formerly known as: Tier I (until 2009); WTA Premier Mandatory and 5 (until 2021))	6	5	11
Singles	WTA 500 (Note: Formerly known as: Tier II (until 2009); WTA Premier (until 2021))	14	12	26
Singles	WTA 250 (Note: Formerly known as: Tier III & IV & V (until 2009); WTA International (until 2021))	2	2	4
Singles	Total	25	23	48
Doubles	Grand Slam	0	1	1
Doubles	Summer Olympics	0	0	0
Doubles	WTA Finals	0	0	0
Doubles	WTA 1000	1	0	1
Doubles	WTA 500	2	0	2
Doubles	WTA 250	0	0	0
Doubles	Total	3	1	4
Total		28	24	52

This is a list of the main career statistics of French professional tennis player Amélie Mauresmo.

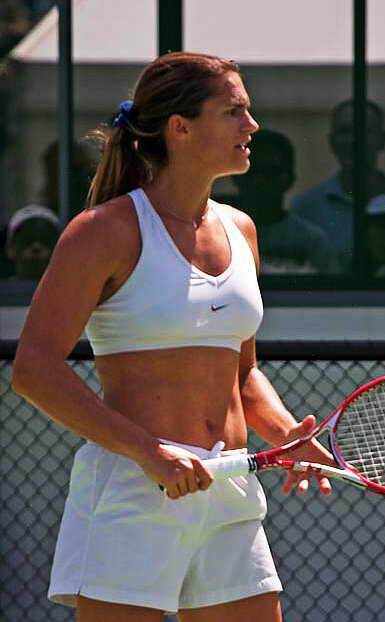
Mauresmo at the 2005 Australian Open practicing.

== Performance timeline ==
Key
W	F	SF	QF	#R	RR	Q#	P#	DNQ	A	Z#	PO	G	S	B	NMS	NTI	P	NH

(W) winner; (F) finalist; (SF) semifinalist; (QF) quarterfinalist; (#R) rounds 4, 3, 2, 1; (RR) round-robin stage; (Q#) qualification round; (P#) preliminary round; (DNQ) did not qualify; (A) absent; (Z#) Davis/Fed Cup Zonal Group (with number indication) or (PO) play-off; (G) gold, (S) silver or (B) bronze Olympic/Paralympic medal; (NMS) not a Masters tournament; (NTI) not a Tier I tournament; (P) postponed; (NH) not held; (SR) strike rate (events won / competed); (W–L) win–loss record.

=== Singles ===
Tournament	1993	1994	1995	1996	1997	1998	1999	2000	2001	2002	2003	2004	2005	2006	2007	2008	2009	SR	W–L	Win%
Grand Slam tournaments
Australian Open	A	A	A	Q2	Q2	3R	F	2R	4R	QF	A	QF^{1}	QF	W	4R	3R	3R	1 / 14	38–9	–
French Open	A	A	1R	2R	2R	1R	2R	4R	1R	4R	QF	QF	3R	4R	3R	2R	1R	0 / 16	25–15	–
Wimbledon	A	A	A	A	Q3	2R	A	1R	3R	SF	A	SF	SF	W	4R	3R	4R	1 / 11	35–9	–
US Open	A	A	A	A	A	3R	4R	A	QF	SF	QF	QF	QF	SF	A	4R	2R	0 / 11	35–10	–
Win–loss	0–0	0–0	3–1	2–2	4–3	5–4	10–3	4–3	9–4	17–4	8–2	17–3	15–4	22–2	8–3	8–4	6–4	2 / 53	127–42	–
Year-end championships
Grand Slam Cup	not held					DNQ	QF	not held										0 / 1	0–1	–
WTA Finals	did not qualify						1R	DNQ	1R	A	F	SF	W	F	did not qualify			1 / 6	12–9	–
WTA Premier Mandatory & 5 + Tier I tournaments
Qatar / Dubai Open^{2}	not held								not tier I							2R	NH	0 / 1	1–1	50%
Indian Wells Open	not tier I			A	A	A	A	2R	A	A	QF^{1}	A	3R	A	A	3R	3R	0 / 5	6–4	60%
Miami Open	A	A	A	A	A	2R	3R	A	A	A	4R	A	SF	SF	A	3R	4R	0 / 7	15–7	68%
Berlin / Madrid Open^{3}	A	A	A	A	A	F	3R	2R	W	QF^{1}	SF	W	QF	SF	3R	A	SF	2 / 11	32–8	80%
Italian Open	A	A	A	A	A	Q1	SF	F	F	QF	F	W	W	A	2R	A	1R	2 / 9	29–7	81%
Canadian Open	A	A	A	A	A	1R	A	A	3R	W	QF	W	SF	A	A	A	1R	2 / 7	16–5	76%
Pan Pacific / Wuhan Open^{4}	A	A	A	A	A	A	A	A	A	A	A	A	A	A	A	1R	A	0 / 1	0–1	0%
Charleston Open^{5}	A	A	A	A	Q1	1R	2R	A	QF	2R	A	A	A	A	A	A	NMS	0 / 4	2–4	33%
Southern California Open^{5}	not tier I											2R	A	A	A	not held		0 / 1	0–1	0%
Kremlin Cup^{5}	not held			NT1	A	A	A	SF	2R	SF	F	A	2R	QF	1R	2R	NMS	0 / 8	10–8	56%
Zurich Open^{5}	A	A	A	A	A	2R	A	A	A	A	2R	A	2R	QF^{1}	2R	not held		0 / 5	3–4	43%
Win–loss	0–0	0–0	0–0	0–0	0–0	7–5	7–4	9–4	12–4	11–3	17–6	14–1	15–6	9–3	2–4	4–5	7–5	6 / 59	114–50	70%
Career statistics
	1993	1994	1995	1996	1997	1998	1999	2000	2001	2002	2003	2004	2005	2006	2007	2008	2009	SR	W–L	Win%
Tournaments	1	6	11	7	21	21	16	14	16	17	17	17	19	17	18	19	13	Career total: 250		
Finals	0	0	1	1	1	1	3	3	5	2	6	9	7	7	3	0	1	Career total: 48		
Titles	0	0	1	0	1	0	1	1	4	2	2	5	4	4	1	0	1	Career total: 25		
Hardcourt win–loss	0–0	0–1	4–6	6–3	5–6	16–8	21–8	5–4	17–6	25–5	23–10	34–6	34–10	28–9	8–5	23–14	17–9		266–109	–
Clay win–loss	0–1	0–2	9–3	2–2	5–7	12–9	7–4	13–4	17–4^{4}	9–4	19–3	22–3	10–3	7–3	7–5	4–2	6–3		149–62	–
Grass win–loss	0–0	3–2	0–0	1–1	7–2	1–2	0–0	0–1	2–1	7–2	1–1	7–2	5–2	7–1	6–2	3–2	4–2		54–23	–
Carpet win–loss	0–0	0–1	1–1	0–1	9–5	2–4	8–3	6–4	10–1	7–4	10–2	0–0	7–2	9–1	7–3	2–1	0–0		78–33	–
Overall win–loss	0–1	3–6	14–10	9–7	26–20	31–23	36–15	24–13	46–12^{4}	48–15	53–16	63–11	56–17	51–14	28–15	32–19	27–14		547–227	–
Year-end ranking			290	159	109	29	10	16	9	6	4	2	3	3	18	24	15	$15,022,476		

Notes

- ^{1} Withdraw during the tournament. Not counted as a loss.
- ^{2} The first Premier 5 event of the year has switched back and forth between the Dubai Tennis Championships and the Qatar Open since 2009. Dubai was classified as a Premier 5 event from 2009 to 2011 before being succeeded by Doha for the 2012–2014 period.
- ^{3} In 2009, the WTA German Open was abolished and replaced by the Madrid Open.
- ^{4} In 2014, the Pan Pacific Open was downgraded to a Premier event and replaced by the Wuhan Open.
- ^{5} In 2009, Tier I was reclassified as WTA Premier Mandatory and Premier 5. The tournaments covered by this note were either downgraded to lower categories or discontinued.

== Grand Slam tournament finals ==
=== Singles: 3 (2 titles, 1 runner-up) ===
Result	Year	Tournament	Surface	Opponent	Score
Loss	1999	Australian Open	Hard	(Switzerland) Martina Hingis	2–6, 3–6
Win	2006	Australian Open	Hard	(Belgium) Justine Henin	6–1, 2–0 ret.
Win	2006	Wimbledon	Grass	(Belgium) Justine Henin	2–6, 6–3, 6–4

=== Doubles: 1 (1 runner-up) ===
Result	Year	Tournament	Surface	Partner	Opponents	Score
Loss	2005	Wimbledon	Grass	(Russia) Svetlana Kuznetsova	(Zimbabwe) Cara Black (South Africa) Liezel Huber	2–6, 1–6

== Other significant finals ==
=== WTA Finals ===
==== Singles: 3 (1 title, 2 runner-ups) ====
Result	Year	Tournament	Surface	Opponent	Score
Loss	2003	WTA Finals, Los Angeles	Hard (i)	(Belgium) Kim Clijsters	2–6, 0–6
Win	2005	WTA Finals, Los Angeles	Hard (i)	(France) Mary Pierce	5–7, 7–6^{(7–3)}, 6–4
Loss	2006	WTA Finals, Madrid	Hard (i)	(Belgium) Justine Henin	4–6, 3–6

=== Summer Olympics ===
==== Singles: 1 (silver medal) ====
Result	Year	Tournament	Surface	Opponent	Score
Silver	2004	Athens Olympics	Hard	(Belgium) Justine Henin	3–6, 3–6

== WTA Tour finals ==
=== Singles: 48 (25 titles, 23 runners-up) ===
Legend Grand Slam (2–1) Olympics (0–1) Finals (1–2) Tier I (6–5) Premier (Tier II) (14–12) Tier III / Tier IV (2–2)	Finals by Surface Hard (13–11) Grass (1–1) Clay (6–7) Carpet (5–4)

Result	W–L	Date	Tournament	Tier	Surface	Opponent	Score
Loss	0–1	May 1998	Berlin Open, Germany	Tier I	Clay	(Spain) Conchita Martínez	4–6, 4–6
Loss	0–2	Jan 1999	Australian Open, Australia	Grand Slam	Hard	(Switzerland) Martina Hingis	2–6, 3–6
Loss	0–3	Feb 1999	Open GDF Suez, France	Tier II	Carpet (i)	(United States) Serena Williams	2–6, 6–3, 6–7^{(4–7)}
Win	1–3	Oct 1999	WTA Bratislava, Slovakia	Tier IV	Hard (i)	(Belgium) Kim Clijsters	6–3, 6–3
Win	2–3	Jan 2000	Sydney International, Australia	Tier II	Hard	(United States) Lindsay Davenport	7–6^{(7–2)}, 6–4
Loss	2–4	May 2000	Bol Open, Croatia	Tier III	Clay	(Slovenia) Tina Pisnik	6–7^{(4–7)}, 6–7^{(2–7)}
Loss	2–5	May 2000	Italian Open, Italy	Tier I	Clay	(United States) Monica Seles	2–6, 6–7^{(4–7)}
Win	3–5	Feb 2001	Open GDF Suez, France	Tier II	Carpet (i)	(Germany) Anke Huber	7–6^{(7–2)}, 6–1
Win	4–5	Feb 2001	Nice Internationaux, France	Tier II	Hard (i)	(Bulgaria) Magdalena Maleeva	6–2, 6–0
Win	5–5	Apr 2001	Amelia Island Championships, United States	Tier II	Clay	(South Africa) Amanda Coetzer	6–4, 7–5
Win	6–5	May 2001	Berlin Open, Germany	Tier I	Clay	(United States) Jennifer Capriati	6–4, 2–6, 6–3
Loss	6–6	May 2001	Italian Open, Italy	Tier I	Clay	(Serbia and Montenegro) Jelena Dokić	6–7^{(3–7)}, 1–6
Win	7–6	Feb 2002	Dubai Championships, United Arab Emirates	Tier II	Hard	(France) Sandrine Testud	6–4, 7–6^{(7–3)}
Win	8–6	Aug 2002	Canadian Open (Montreal), Canada	Tier I	Hard	(United States) Jennifer Capriati	6–4, 6–1
Loss	8–7	Feb 2003	Open GDF Suez, France	Tier II	Carpet (i)	(United States) Serena Williams	3–6, 2–6
Win	9–7	Apr 2003	Warsaw Open, Poland	Tier II	Clay	(United States) Venus Williams	6–7^{(6–8)}, 6–0, 3–0, ret.
Loss	9–8	May 2003	Italian Open, Italy	Tier I	Clay	(Belgium) Kim Clijsters	6–3, 6–7^{(3–7)}, 0–6
Loss	9–9	Sep 2003	Kremlin Cup, Russia	Tier I	Carpet (i)	(Russia) Anastasia Myskina	2–6, 4–6
Win	10–9	Oct 2003	Philadelphia Championships, United States	Tier II	Hard	(Russia) Anastasia Myskina	5–7, 6–0, 6–2
Loss	10–10	Nov 2003	WTA Finals, United States	Finals	Hard (i)	(Belgium) Kim Clijsters	2–6, 0–6
Loss	10–11	Jan 2004	Sydney International, Australia	Tier II	Hard	(Belgium) Justine Henin	4–6, 4–6
Loss	10–12	Apr 2004	Amelia Island Championships, United States	Tier II	Clay	(United States) Lindsay Davenport	4–6, 4–6
Win	11–12	May 2004	Berlin Open, Germany	Tier I	Clay	(United States) Venus Williams	w/o
Win	12–12	May 2004	Italian Open, Italy	Tier I	Clay	(United States) Jennifer Capriati	3–6, 6–3, 7–6^{(8–6)}
Win	13–12	Aug 2004	Canadian Open (Montreal), Canada	Tier I	Hard	(Russia) Elena Likhovtseva	6–1, 6–0
Loss	13–13	Aug 2004	Summer Olympic Games, Athens	Olympics	Hard	(Belgium) Justine Henin	3–6, 3–6
Loss	13–14	Oct 2004	Stuttgart Open, Germany	Tier II	Hard	(United States) Lindsay Davenport	2–6, ret.
Win	14–14	Oct 2004	Linz Open, Austria	Tier II	Hard	(Russia) Elena Bovina	6–2, 6–0
Win	15–14	Oct 2004	Philadelphia Championships, United States	Tier II	Hard	(Russia) Vera Zvonareva	3–6, 6–2, 6–2
Loss	15–15	Feb 2005	Open GDF Suez, France	Tier II	Carpet (i)	(Russia) Dinara Safina	4–6, 6–2, 3–6
Win	16–15	Feb 2005	Diamond Games, Belgium	Tier II	Carpet	(United States) Venus Williams	4–6, 7–5, 6–4
Win	17–15	May 2005	Italian Open, Italy	Tier I	Clay	(Switzerland) Patty Schnyder	2–6, 6–3, 6–4
Loss	17–16	Aug 2005	Connecticut Open, United States	Tier II	Hard	(United States) Lindsay Davenport	4–6, 4–6
Loss	17–17	Oct 2005	Stuttgart Open, Germany	Tier II	Hard	(United States) Lindsay Davenport	2–6, 4–6
Win	18–17	Oct 2005	Philadelphia Championships, United States	Tier II	Hard	(Russia) Elena Dementieva	7–5, 2–6, 7–5
Win	19–17	Nov 2005	WTA Finals, United States	Finals	Hard (i)	(France) Mary Pierce	5–7, 7–6^{(7–3)}, 6–4
Win	20–17	Jan 2006	Australian Open, Australia	Grand Slam	Hard	(Belgium) Justine Henin	6–1, 2–0 ret.
Win	21–17	Feb 2006	Open GDF Suez, France	Tier II	Carpet (i)	(France) Mary Pierce	6–1, 7–6^{(7–2)}
Win	22–17	Feb 2006	Diamond Games, Belgium	Tier II	Carpet	(Belgium) Kim Clijsters	3–6, 6–3, 6–3
Loss	22–18	Feb 2006	Qatar Open, Qatar	Tier II	Hard	(Russia) Nadia Petrova	3–6, 5–7
Win	23–18	Jul 2006	Wimbledon, United Kingdom	Grand Slam	Grass	(Belgium) Justine Henin	2–6, 6–3, 6–4
Loss	23–19	Sep 2006	China Open, China	Tier II	Hard	(Russia) Svetlana Kuznetsova	4–6, 0–6
Loss	23–20	Nov 2006	WTA Finals, Spain	Finals	Hard (i)	(Belgium) Justine Henin	4–6, 3–6
Win	24–20	Feb 2007	Diamond Games, Belgium	Tier II	Carpet	(Belgium) Kim Clijsters	6–4, 7–6^{(7–4)}
Loss	24–21	Feb 2007	Dubai Championships, United Arab Emirates	Tier II	Hard	(Belgium) Justine Henin	4–6, 5–7
Loss	24–22	May 2007	Internationaux de Strasbourg, France	Tier III	Clay	(Spain) Anabel Medina Garrigues	4–6, 6–4, 4–6
Loss	24–23	Jun 2007	Eastbourne International, United Kingdom	Tier II	Grass	(Belgium) Justine Henin	5–7, 7–6^{(7–4)}, 6–7^{(2–7)}
Win	25–23	Feb 2009	Open GDF Suez, France	Premier	Hard (i)	(Russia) Elena Dementieva	7–6^{(9–7)}, 2–6, 6–4

=== Doubles (3 titles, 1 runner-up) ===
Legend Grand Slam (0–1) Premier M (1–0) Tier II (2–0)	Finals by Surface Hard (1–0) Grass (1–1) Carpet (1–0)

Result	W–L	Date	Tournament	Tier	Surface	Partner	Opponent	Score
Win	1–0	Oct 2000	Linz Open, Austria	Tier II	Carpet (i)	(United States) Chanda Rubin	(Japan) Ai Sugiyama (France) Nathalie Tauziat	6–4, 6–4
Loss	1–1	Jul 2005	Wimbledon, United Kingdom	Grand Slam	Grass	(Russia) Svetlana Kuznetsova	(Zimbabwe) Cara Black (South Africa) Liezel Huber	2–6, 1–6
Win	2–1	Jun 2006	Eastbourne International, United Kingdom	Tier II	Grass	(Russia) Svetlana Kuznetsova	(South Africa) Liezel Huber (United States) Martina Navratilova	6–2, 6–4
Win	3–1	Apr 2009	Miami Open, United States	Premier M	Hard	(Russia) Svetlana Kuznetsova	(Czech Republic) Květa Peschke (United States) Lisa Raymond	4–6, 6–3, [10–3]

== ITF Circuit finals ==
=== Singles: 3 (2 titles, 1 runner–up) ===
Legend
50K tournaments
25K tournaments
10K tournaments

Result	W–L	Date	Tournament	Tier	Surface	Opponent	Score
Win	1–0	Oct 1995	ITF Saint-Raphaël, France	10K	Clay	(France) Ségolène Berger	6–3, 6–2
Loss	1–1	Aug 1996	ITF Bronx, United States	25K	Hard	(Spain) Virginia Ruano Pascual	4–6, 3–6
Win	2–1	Sep 1997	ITF Thessaloniki, Greece	50K	Grass	(Spain) Eva Bes	6–0, 6–0

=== Doubles: 4 (2 titles, 2 runner–ups) ===
Legend
25K tournaments
10K tournaments

Result	W–L	Date	Tournament	Tier	Surface	Partner	Opponents	Score
Win	1–0	May 1995	ITF Le Touquet, France	10K	Clay	(United Kingdom) Amanda Wainwright	(Greece) Julia Apostoli (France) Sylvie Sabas	6–4, 6–2
Win	2–0	Oct 1995	ITF Saint-Raphaël, France	10K	Clay	(France) Berangere Quillot	(France) Pascale Etchemendy (France) Angelique Olivier	6–3, 7–6^{(4)}
Loss	2–1	Oct 1995	ITF Flensburg, Germany	25K	Carpet (i)	(Germany) Sandra Klösel	(United Kingdom) Yvette Basting (Ukraine) Elena Tatarkova	4–6, 6–2, 2–6
Loss	2–2	Apr 1996	ITF Gelos, France	10K	Clay	(France) Isabelle Taesch	(Zimbabwe) Cara Black (India) Nirupama Vaidyanathan	6–7^{(4)}, 3–6

== WTA Tour career earnings ==
Year	Grand Slam titles	WTA titles	Total titles	Earnings ($)	Money list rank
1993	0	0	0	122	No data
1994	0	0	0	857	No data
1995	0	0	0	13,571	No data
1996	0	0	0	22,914	No data
1997	0	0	0	51,037	No data
1998	0	0	0	187,084	39
1999	0	1	1	582,468	13
2000	0	1	1	365,074	24
2001	0	4	4	867,702	11
2002	0	2	2	1,073,807	9
2003	0	2	2	1,560,341	6
2004	0	5	5	1,964,070	6
2005	0	4	4	2,843,708	2
2006	2	2	4	3,469,727	3
2007	0	1	1	736,354	20
2008	0	0	0	568,029	26
2009	0	1	1	715,611	24
Career	2	23	25	15,022,476	14

Notes

- Grand Slam titles, WTA titles, Total titles – Includes singles, doubles and mixed doubles titles.

== Wins against top 10 players ==
- Mauresmo has a 76–80 record against players who were, at the time the match was played, ranked in the top 10.

No.	Player	Rk	Event	Surface	Rd	Score	Rk	Years	Ref
1	(United States) Lindsay Davenport	2	Berlin Open, Germany	Clay	3R	6–2, 6–4	65	1998	
2	(Czech Republic) Jana Novotná	3	Berlin Open, Germany	Clay	SF	7–5, 5–7, 6–4	65	1998	
3	(France) Nathalie Tauziat	9	Connecticut Open, United States	Hard	1R	7–6, 6–0	32	1998	
4	(Switzerland) Patty Schnyder	9	Australian Open, Australia	Hard	2R	6–7^{(1–7)}, 6–4, 6–3	29	1999	
5	(United States) Lindsay Davenport	1	Australian Open, Australia	Hard	SF	4–6, 7–5, 7–5	29	1999	
6	(Switzerland) Martina Hingis	1	Open GDF Suez, France	Carpet (i)	QF	2–6, 6–1, 6–3	18	1999	
7	(France) Julie Halard-Decugis	10	Connecticut Open, United States	Hard	2R	6–1, 6–2	17	1999	
8	(France) Mary Pierce	5	Sydney International, Australia	Hard	QF	6–2, 6–3	10	2000	
9	(Switzerland) Martina Hingis	1	Sydney International, Australia	Hard	SF	7–5, 6–3	10	2000	
10	(United States) Lindsay Davenport	2	Sydney International, Australia	Hard	F	7–6^{(7–2)}, 6–4	10	2000	
11	(France) Mary Pierce	5	Italian Open, Italy	Clay	3R	6–3, 6–4	18	2000	
12	(Spain) Arantxa Sánchez Vicario	10	Italian Open, Italy	Clay	QF	6–1, 5–7, 6–4	18	2000	
13	(United States) Monica Seles	4	Sydney International, Australia	Hard	QF	6–4, 7–6^{(7–5)}	16	2001	
14	(Russia) Anna Kournikova	8	Open GDF Suez, France	Carpet (i)	QF	2–6, 7–6^{(7–4)}, 6–1	19	2001	
15	(South Africa) Amanda Coetzer	10	Amelia Island Championships, United States	Clay	F	6–4, 7–5	15	2001	
16	(South Africa) Amanda Coetzer	8	Berlin Open, Germany	Clay	QF	6–7^{(5–7)}, 6–3, 6–3	9	2001	
17	(Switzerland) Martina Hingis	1	Berlin Open, Germany	Clay	SF	2–6, 6–0, 6–4	9	2001	
18	(United States) Jennifer Capriati	4	Berlin Open, Germany	Clay	F	6–4, 2–6, 6–3	9	2001	
19	(Switzerland) Martina Hingis	1	Italian Open, Italy	Clay	SF	6–4, 7–6^{(7–5)}	6	2001	
20	(France) Nathalie Tauziat	9	US Open, United States	Hard	4R	6–0, 6–7^{(1–7)}, 6–3	7	2001	
21	(United States) Monica Seles	6	Dubai Championships, United Arab Emirates	Hard	SF	6–4, 6–3	10	2002	
22	(United States) Jennifer Capriati	3	Wimbledon, United Kingdom	Grass	QF	6–3, 6–2	11	2002	
23	(United States) Jennifer Capriati	3	Canadian Open, Canada	Hard	F	6–4, 6–1	10	2002	
24	(Belgium) Kim Clijsters	7	US Open, United States	Hard	4R	4–6, 6–3, 7–5	9	2002	
25	(United States) Jennifer Capriati	3	US Open, United States	Hard	QF	4–6, 7–6^{(7–5)}, 6–3	9	2002	
26	(Serbia and Montenegro) Jelena Dokić	10	Warsaw Open, Poland	Clay	SF	7–5, 6–2	7	2003	
27	(United States) Venus Williams	3	Warsaw Open, Poland	Clay	F	6–7^{(6–8)}, 6–0, 3–0, ret.	7	2003	
28	(United States) Jennifer Capriati	7	Italian Open, Italy	Clay	QF	6–3, 7–6^{(12–10)}	6	2003	
29	(United States) Serena Williams	1	Italian Open, Italy	Clay	SF	1–6, 7–5, 6–3	6	2003	
30	(Russia) Elena Dementieva	8	Kremlin Cup, Russia	Carpet (i)	SF	6–4, 6–1	7	2003	
31	(Russia) Anastasia Myskina	9	Philadelphia Championships, United States	Hard (i)	F	5–7, 6–0, 6–2	7	2003	
32	(Russia) Elena Dementieva	9	WTA Finals, United States	Hard (i)	RR	6–3, 6–2	6	2003	
33	(Belgium) Justine Henin	2	WTA Finals, United States	Hard (i)	SF	7–6^{(7–2)}, 3–6, 6–3	6	2003	
34	(Russia) Anastasia Myskina	7	Fed Cup, Moscow, Russia	Carpet (i)	SF	6–7^{(3–7)}, 6–3, 6–4	4	2003	
35	(Russia) Anastasia Myskina	7	Sydney International, Australia	Hard	QF	6–4, 7–6^{(7–4)}	4	2004	
36	(Belgium) Justine Henin	1	Amelia Island Championships, United States	Clay	SF	6–7^{(4–7)}, 7–5, 6–3	3	2004	
37	(United States) Jennifer Capriati	8	Berlin Open, Germany	Clay	SF	6–2, 6–0	3	2004	
38	(United States) Jennifer Capriati	8	Italian Open, Italy	Clay	F	3–6, 6–3, 7–6^{(8–6)}	3	2004	
39	(Russia) Svetlana Kuznetsova	10	Summer Olympics, Athens, Greece	Hard	QF	7–6^{(7–5)}, 4–6, 6–2	2	2004	
40	(Russia) Svetlana Kuznetsova	5	Stuttgart Open, Germany	Hard (i)	SF	7–5, 6–4	1	2004	
41	(United States) Venus Williams	10	Philadelphia Championships, United States	Hard (i)	QF	7–5, 5–7, 6–1	2	2004	
42	(Russia) Maria Sharapova	6	WTA Finals, United States	Hard (i)	RR	7–5, 6–4	2	2004	
43	(Russia) Svetlana Kuznetsova	4	WTA Finals, United States	Hard (i)	RR	6–3, 6–2	2	2004	
44	(Australia) Alicia Molik	10	Diamond Games, Belgium	Hard (i)	SF	6–3, 7–6^{(7–2)}	2	2005	
45	(United States) Venus Williams	8	Diamond Games, Belgium	Hard (i)	F	4–6, 7–5, 6–4	2	2005	
46	(Russia) Vera Zvonareva	10	Italian Open, Italy	Clay	SF	6–2, 6–4	3	2005	
47	(Russia) Anastasia Myskina	10	Wimbledon, United Kingdom	Grass	QF	6–3, 6–4	3	2005	
48	(Russia) Nadia Petrova	10	Canadian Open, Canada	Hard	QF	4–6, 7–5, 2–0, ret.	3	2005	
49	(Russia) Nadia Petrova	9	Stuttgart Open, Germany	Hard (i)	QF	2–6, 6–2, 6–4	4	2005	
50	(Russia) Elena Dementieva	8	Stuttgart Open, Germany	Hard (i)	SF	6–3, 6–4	4	2005	
51	(Russia) Elena Dementieva	10	Philadelphia Championships, United States	Hard (i)	F	7–5, 2–6, 7–5	4	2005	
52	(Belgium) Kim Clijsters	2	WTA Finals, United States	Hard (i)	RR	6–3, 7–6^{(7–4)}	4	2005	
53	(Russia) Elena Dementieva	7	WTA Finals, United States	Hard (i)	RR	6–2, 6–3	4	2005	
54	(Russia) Maria Sharapova	3	WTA Finals, United States	Hard (i)	SF	7–6^{(7–1)}, 6–3	4	2005	
55	(France) Mary Pierce	5	WTA Finals, United States	Hard (i)	F	5–7, 7–6^{(7–3)}, 6–4	4	2005	
56	(Switzerland) Patty Schnyder	8	Australian Open, Australia	Hard	QF	6–3, 6–0	3	2006	
57	(Belgium) Kim Clijsters	2	Australian Open, Australia	Hard	SF	5–7, 6–2, 3–2, ret.	3	2006	
58	(Belgium) Justine Henin	6	Australian Open, Australia	Hard	F	6–1, 2–0, ret.	3	2006	
59	(France) Mary Pierce	6	Open GDF Suez, France	Carpet (i)	F	6–1, 7–6^{(7–2)}	2	2006	
60	(Switzerland) Patty Schnyder	9	Diamond Games, Belgium	Hard (i)	QF	6–2, 6–4	2	2006	
61	(Russia) Nadia Petrova	7	Diamond Games, Belgium	Hard (i)	SF	6–4, 7–5	2	2006	
62	(Belgium) Kim Clijsters	1	Diamond Games, Belgium	Hard (i)	F	3–6, 6–3, 6–3	2	2006	
63	(Russia) Nadia Petrova	7	Miami Open, United States	Hard	QF	6–3, 6–1	1	2006	
64	(Russia) Maria Sharapova	4	Wimbledon, United Kingdom	Grass	SF	6–3, 3–6, 6–2	1	2006	
65	(Belgium) Justine Henin	3	Wimbledon, United Kingdom	Grass	F	2–6, 6–3, 6–4	1	2006	
66	(Belgium) Justine Henin	3	WTA Finals, Spain	Hard (i)	RR	4–6, 7–6^{(7–3)}, 6–2	1	2006	
67	(Switzerland) Martina Hingis	7	WTA Finals, Spain	Hard (i)	RR	3–6, 6–1, 6–4	1	2006	
68	(Belgium) Kim Clijsters	6	WTA Finals, Spain	Hard (i)	SF	6–2, 3–6, 6–3	1	2006	
69	(Belgium) Kim Clijsters	4	Diamond Games, Belgium	Hard (i)	F	6–4, 7–6^{(7–4)}	3	2007	
70	(Serbia) Ana Ivanovic	5	Brisbane International, Australia	Hard	QF	6–3, 6–2	23	2009	
71	(Poland) Agnieszka Radwańska	10	Open GDF Suez, France	Hard (i)	QF	6–2, 6–0	24	2009	
72	(Serbia) Jelena Janković	3	Open GDF Suez, France	Hard (i)	SF	6–2, 0–6, 6–1	24	2009	
73	(Russia) Elena Dementieva	4	Open GDF Suez, France	Hard (i)	F	7–6^{(9–7)}, 2–6, 6–4	24	2009	
74	(Russia) Elena Dementieva	5	Madrid Open, Spain	Clay	3R	1–6, 6–4, 6–2	21	2009	
75	(Russia) Vera Zvonareva	7	Eastbourne International, United Kingdom	Grass	1R	6–3, 1–6, 6–3	17	2009	
76	(Russia) Svetlana Kuznetsova	6	Connecticut Open, United States	Hard	QF	7–6^{(11–9)}, 2–6, 6–3	18	2009	

- Key: (Rk) first use, opponent rank; (Rd) round; (Rk) 2nd use, player rank; (Ref) reference; (F) final; (SF) semifinal; (QF) quarterfinal; (#R) rounds 4, 3, 2, 1; (RR) round-robin stage

== Longest winning streak ==
=== 16-match win streak (2001) ===
No.	Tournament	Tier	Start date	Surface	Rd	Opponent	Rk	Score
–	Australian Open	Grand Slam	15 January 2001	Hard	4R	(United States) Venus Williams (3)	3	2–6, 6–3, 3–6
1	Open Gaz de France	Tier II	6 February 2001	Carpet (i)	1R	(Russia) Tatiana Panova	32	6–4, 6–2
2	Open Gaz de France	Tier II	6 February 2001	Carpet (i)	2R	(Spain) Magüi Serna	34	4–6, 6–3, 6–4
3	Open Gaz de France	Tier II	6 February 2001	Carpet (i)	QF	(Russia) Anna Kournikova (2)	8	2–6, 7–6^{(7–4)}, 6–1
4	Open Gaz de France	Tier II	6 February 2001	Carpet (i)	SF	(France) Nathalie Tauziat (3)	11	6–2, 6–1
5	Open Gaz de France	Tier II	6 February 2001	Carpet (i)	F	(Germany) Anke Huber (6)	16	7–6^{(7–2)}, 6–1
6	Nice Open	Tier II	12 February 2001	Hard (i)	1R	(Sweden) Åsa Carlsson (LL)	65	6–1, 6–3
7	Nice Open	Tier II	12 February 2001	Hard (i)	2R	(Czech Republic) Květa Hrdličková	53	6–2, 6–2
8	Nice Open	Tier II	12 February 2001	Hard (i)	QF	(Luxembourg) Anne Kremer	32	6–2, 6–3
9	Nice Open	Tier II	12 February 2001	Hard (i)	SF	(Germany) Anke Huber (5)	16	2–6, 6–1, 6–1
10	Nice Open	Tier II	12 February 2001	Hard (i)	F	(Bulgaria) Magdalena Maleeva	20	6–2, 6–0
11	Amelia Island Championships	Tier II	9 April 2001	Clay	2R	(United States) Kristina Brandi	39	6–2, 6–1
12	Amelia Island Championships	Tier II	9 April 2001	Clay	3R	(United States) Lisa Raymond (12)	25	7–6^{(7–3)}, 4–6, 6–3
–	Amelia Island Championships	Tier II	9 April 2001	Clay	QF	(Russia) Elena Dementieva (3)	9	Walkover
13	Amelia Island Championships	Tier II	9 April 2001	Clay	SF	(Spain) Arantxa Sánchez Vicario (7)	11	6–3, 6–2
14	Amelia Island Championships	Tier II	9 April 2001	Clay	F	(South Africa) Amanda Coetzer (4)	10	6–4, 7–5
15	Family Circle Cup	Tier I	16 April 2001	Clay	2R	(United States) Marissa Irvin (WC)	124	6–2, 2–6, 6–3
16	Family Circle Cup	Tier I	16 April 2001	Clay	3R	(United States) Lisa Raymond (11)	25	7–5, 7–5
–	Family Circle Cup	Tier I	16 April 2001	Clay	QF	(Switzerland) Martina Hingis (1)	1	5–7, 2–6
