= 2003 WTA Tour Championships =

- Date: November 4–10
- Edition: 33rd
- Category: Year-end championships
- Draw: 8S (round robin) / 4D
- Prize money: $3,000,000
- Surface: Hard / indoor
- Location: Los Angeles, United States
- Venue: Staples Center

Champions

Singles
- (Belgium) Kim Clijsters

Doubles
- (Spain) Virginia Ruano Pascual / (Argentina) Paola Suárez
← 2002 ·	WTA Finals	· 2004 →

The 2003 WTA Tour Championships, also known by its sponsored name Bank of America WTA Tour Championships, was a women's tennis tournament played on indoor hard courts at the Staples Center in Los Angeles, United States. It was the 33rd edition of the year-end singles championships, the 28th edition of the year-end doubles championships, and was part of the 2003 WTA Tour. The tournament was held between November 4 and November 10, 2003. First-seeded Kim Clijsters won the singles event and earned $1,000,030 (Note: The added $30 represented the WTA Tour's celebration of its 30th anniversary.) first-prize money as well as 485 ranking points. With her victory Clijsters became the first female tennis player to earn $US4 million in a season. For the first time since 1978 a round robin system was used, after the men's Tennis Masters Cup. Two groups of four players were formed and each contender had to play three matches. Also, for singles, instead of the top sixteen players qualifying, only top eight qualified for the WTA Tour Championships. For doubles, the top four pairs (previously top eight) pairs qualified for the WTA Tour Championships, but still continued with the single elimination format.

== Finals ==
=== Singles ===
(Belgium) Kim Clijsters defeated (France) Amélie Mauresmo, 6–2, 6–0.

- It was Clijsters's 2nd WTA Championships title, her 9th title of the season and the 19th of her career.

=== Doubles ===
(Spain) Virginia Ruano Pascual / (Argentina) Paola Suárez defeated (Belgium) Kim Clijsters / (Japan) Ai Sugiyama, 6–4, 3–6, 6–3.

== Notes ==
=== Singles ===
Players in gold have qualified for Los Angeles. Players in brown withdrawn. The low-ranked players in blue after them would be played as alternates in Los Angeles.

Rank	Player	1	2	3	4	5	6	7	8	9	10	11	12	13	14	15	16	17	Total points	Tourn
1	(Belgium) Justine Henin-Hardenne	W 650+506	W 650+424	SF; 292+168	W 275+165	W 275+145	W 275+128	W 300+101	W 220+171	SF; 292+78	W 195+129	F 154+93	F 137+22	SF; 88+39	SF; 88+38	F 85+29	SF; 88+17	QF; 81+20	6,418	17
2	(Belgium) Kim Clijsters	F 456+294	F 456+190	W 325+134	SF; 292+148	SF; 292+140	W 275+127	W 220+163	W 195+155	W 195+103	F 193+102	W 195+69	F 154+83	F 137+98	SF; 146+89	W 145+67	W 120+88	F 137+33	6,348	20
2	(Belgium) Kim Clijsters	SF; 124+25	SF; 88+38	R16; 42+15															6,348	20
3	(United States) Serena Williams	W 650+460	W 650+398	SF; 292+214	W 325+168	F 193+112	W 195+89	SF; 124+46											3,916	7
4	(United States) Lindsay Davenport	SF; 292+116	W 275+88	F 228+91	F 137+93	F 137+92	F 137+83	F 137+73	QF; 162+44	R16; 90+84	SF; 124+40	SF; 99+63	R16; 90+66	QF; 55+35	R16; 45+12	R16; 1+0	R16; 1+0		2,990	16
5	(France) Amélie Mauresmo	F 193+174	W 220+134	W 195+101	F 193+93	QF; 162+76	QF; 162+56	F 137+46	SF; 124+37	SF; 88+39	QF; 81+35	QF; 55+46	QF; 75+25	SF; 88+12	R16; 45+19	R16; 16+8	R16; 1+0		2,736	16
6	(United States) Jennifer Capriati	SF; 292+132	W 195+144	F 228+87	QF; 162+130	SF; 146+47	SF; 124+53	F 137+25	SF; 88+48	SF; 88+33	SF; 88+25	R16; 90+20	QF; 69+14	R128; 2+0	R16; 1+0	R16; 1+0	R16; 1+0	R32; 1+0	2,471	17
7	(Russia) Anastasia Myskina	W 195+225	W 275+104	QF; 162+120	QF; 162+48	R16; 90+98	F 137+51	W 95+66	W 120+32	QF; 69+20	QF; 49+23	QF; 49+23	R16; 42+8	R64; 32+16	R16; 29+15	QF; 37+2	QF; 30+1	R64; 1+0	2,432	23
7	(Russia) Anastasia Myskina	R32; 1+0	R32; 1+0	R64; 1+0	R32; 1+0	R32; 1+0	R32; 1+0												2,432	23
8	(Russia) Elena Dementieva	W 195+191	W 195+96	SF; 135+100	W 145+68	SF; 88+68	SF; 88+66	SF; 124+27	R16; 90+32	QF; 55+58	R16; 90+20	QF; 69+17	R16; 38+25	R16; 45+14	QF; 30+18	R16; 29+15	QF; 24+18	QF; 30+10	2,324	26
8	(Russia) Elena Dementieva	R128; 2+0	R128; 2+0	R32; 1+0	R16; 1+0	R64; 1+0	R64; 1+0	R32; 1+0	R32; 1+0	R16; 1+0									2,324	26
9	(Japan) Ai Sugiyama	W 195+163	W 195+120	SF; 124+54	R16; 90+70	R16; 90+54	R16; 90+40	SF; 88+40	SF; 88+27	SF; 88+10	QF; 49+47	R16; 45+37	QF; 49+19	R16; 29+35	R16; 38+23	R16; 25+23	R64; 32+16	R16; 38+8	2,239	25
9	(Japan) Ai Sugiyama	R32; 28+8	QF; 30+2	R16; 25+2	R32; 1+0	R32; 1+0	R64; 1+0	R32; 1+0	R32; 1+0										2,239	25
10	(United States) Venus Williams	F 456+350	F 456+246	W 195+132	F 154+29	R16; 90+46	R16; 45+12												2,211	6
11	(United States) Chanda Rubin	W 195+96	SF; 146+109	QF; 162+70	SF; 124+38	F 137+20	W 120+30	F 103+26	F 103+22	R16; 90+28	QF; 81+31	QF; 55+45	QF; 49+46	R32; 56+32	R16; 29+35	QF; 49+4	R16; 25+8	R128; 2+0	2,169	20
11	(United States) Chanda Rubin	R32; 1+0	R32; 1+0	R32; 1+0															2,169	20
12	(Russia) Nadia Petrova	SF; 292+218	F 137+65	SF; 124+68	R16; 90+94	QF; 55+93	SF; 88+55	R32; 56+54	SF; 55+51	R32; 56+24	R16; 38+39	QF; 49+12	R16; 42+16	R16; 17.5+25	R16; 23.25+16	R32; 23+4	Q2; 6.25+2	Q2; 6.25+0	2,005	23
12	(Russia) Nadia Petrova	Q2; 4+2	R32; 1+0	R32; 1+0	R32; 1+0	R32; 1+0	R32; 1+0												2,005	23
13	(Russia) Vera Zvonareva	QF; 162+172	QF; 69+88	QF; 81+52	W 120+11	SF; 88+43	QF; 69+58	R16; 90+36	QF; 75+33	QF; 69+31	QF; 69+25	R32; 56+24	SF; 55+24	SF; 55+12	QF; 24+31	R32; 14+15	R16; 25+4	QF; 20+8	1,832	23
13	(Russia) Vera Zvonareva	R16; 16+2	R128; 2+0	R32; 1+0	R128; 1+0	R32; 1+0	R32; 1+0												1,832	23
