= 2003 Porsche Tennis Grand Prix =

- Date: 6–13 October
- Edition: 26th
- Category: Tier II
- Draw: 28S / 16D
- Prize money: $650,000
- Surface: Hard (Greenset) / indoor
- Location: Filderstadt, Germany
- Venue: Filderstadt Tennis Club

Champions

Singles
- (Belgium) Kim Clijsters

Doubles
- (United States) Lisa Raymond / (Australia) Rennae Stubbs
- Porsche Tennis Grand Prix

The 2003 Porsche Tennis Grand Prix was a women's tennis tournament played on indoor hard courts at the Filderstadt Tennis Club in Filderstadt, Germany that was part of Tier II of the 2003 WTA Tour. It was the 26th edition of the tournament and was held from 6 October until 13 October 2003. Third-seeded Kim Clijsters won the singles title and earned $98,500 first-prize money.

== Finals ==
=== Singles ===
(Belgium) Kim Clijsters defeated (Belgium) Justine Henin-Hardenne 5–7, 6–4, 6–2

- It was Clijsters's 7th singles title of the year and the 17th of her career.

=== Doubles ===
(United States) Lisa Raymond / (Australia) Rennae Stubbs defeated (Zimbabwe) Cara Black / (United States) Martina Navratilova 6–2, 6–4

== Prize money ==
Event	W	F	SF	QF	Round of 16	Round of 32
Singles	$98,500	$53,000	$28,300	$15,150	$8,100	$4,350
