= 2003 Dubai Tennis Championships – Doubles =

Doubles
- 2003 Dubai Tennis Championships and the Dubai Duty Free Women's Open

Final
- Champions: (India) Leander Paes (Czech Republic) David Rikl
- Runners-up: (Zimbabwe) Wayne Black (Zimbabwe) Kevin Ullyett
- Score: 6–3, 6–0

Details
- Draw: 16
- Seeds: 4

Events
Singles	men	women
Doubles	men	women
← 2002 ·	Dubai Tennis Championships	· 2004 →
← 2002 ·	Dubai Duty Free Women's Open	· 2004 →

Mark Knowles and Daniel Nestor were the defending champions but did not compete that year.

Leander Paes and David Rikl won in the final 6–3, 6–0 against Wayne Black and Kevin Ullyett.

== Seeds ==
1. (India) Mahesh Bhupathi / (Belarus) Max Mirnyi (semifinals)
2. (Sweden) Jonas Björkman / (Australia) Todd Woodbridge (semifinals)
3. (United States) Donald Johnson / (United States) Jared Palmer (quarterfinals)
4. (Czech Republic) Martin Damm / (Czech Republic) Cyril Suk (first round)

== Draw ==
=== Key ===
- Q = Qualifier
- WC = Wild card
- LL = Lucky loser
- Alt = Alternate
- SE = Special exempt
- PR = Protected ranking
- ITF = ITF entry
- JE = Junior exempt
- w/o = Walkover
- r = Retired
- d = Defaulted
- SR = Special ranking

First round
1	(India) M Bhupathi (Belarus) M Mirnyi	6	6
WC	(Morocco) K Alami (Romania) A Voinea	3	3
(France) F Santoro (Serbia and Montenegro) N Zimonjić	6	7^{7}
ALT	(Uzbekistan) V Kutsenko (Russia) A Stoliarov	1	6^{4}
3	(United States) D Johnson (United States) J Palmer	6	6
WC	(United Arab Emirates) O Bahrouzyan (United Arab Emirates) M Ghareeb	2	3
(Spain) F López (Spain) Á López Morón	3	2
(Zimbabwe) W Black (Zimbabwe) K Ullyett	6	6
(India) L Paes (Czech Republic) D Rikl	6	6
(Germany) R Schüttler (Russia) M Youzhny	1	4
(Russia) Y Kafelnikov (Spain) T Robredo	6	7^{7}
4	(Czech Republic) M Damm (Czech Republic) C Suk	0	6^{2}
(Morocco) H Arazi (Morocco) Y El Aynaoui	0	4
(Slovakia) D Hrbatý (Netherlands) S Schalken	6	6
(Czech Republic) J Novák (Czech Republic) P Pála	6^{4}	6^{5}
2	(Sweden) J Björkman (Australia) T Woodbridge	7^{7}	7^{7}

Quarterfinals
1	(India) M Bhupathi (Belarus) M Mirnyi	6	6^{11}	7
(France) F Santoro (Serbia and Montenegro) N Zimonjić	2	7^{13}	5
3	(United States) D Johnson (United States) J Palmer	5	3
(Zimbabwe) W Black (Zimbabwe) K Ullyett	7	6
(India) L Paes (Czech Republic) D Rikl	6	6
(Russia) Y Kafelnikov (Spain) T Robredo	1	3
(Slovakia) D Hrbatý (Netherlands) S Schalken	3	3
2	(Sweden) J Björkman (Australia) T Woodbridge	6	6

Semifinals
1	(India) M Bhupathi (Belarus) M Mirnyi	4	6	6^{4}
(Zimbabwe) W Black (Zimbabwe) K Ullyett	6	0	7^{7}
(India) L Paes (Czech Republic) D Rikl	6	2	6
2	(Sweden) J Björkman (Australia) T Woodbridge	2	6	4

Final
(Zimbabwe) W Black (Zimbabwe) K Ullyett	3	0
(India) L Paes (Czech Republic) D Rikl	6	6
