= 2003 Dubai Duty Free Women's Open – Doubles =

Doubles
- 2003 Dubai Tennis Championships and the Dubai Duty Free Women's Open

Final
- Champions: (Russia) Svetlana Kuznetsova (United States) Martina Navratilova
- Runners-up: (Zimbabwe) Cara Black (Russia) Elena Likhovtseva
- Score: 6–3, 7–6^{(9–7)}

Events
Singles	men	women
Doubles	men	women
- Dubai Tennis Championships Dubai Duty Free Women's Open

Barbara Rittner and María Vento-Kabchi were the defending champions, but Rittner did not compete this year. Vento-Kabchi teamed up with Angelique Widjaja and lost in semifinals to tournament winners Svetlana Kuznetsova and Martina Navratilova.

Svetlana Kuznetsova and Martina Navratilova won the title by defeating Cara Black and Elena Likhovtseva 6–3, 7–6^{(9–7)} in the final.

== Seeds ==
1. (Zimbabwe) Cara Black / (Russia) Elena Likhovtseva (final)
2. (Hungary) Petra Mandula / (Austria) Patricia Wartusch (first round)
3. (Chinese Taipei) Janet Lee / (Indonesia) Wynne Prakusya (quarterfinals)
4. (Russia) Svetlana Kuznetsova / (United States) Martina Navratilova (champions)

== Draw ==
Key

- Q = Qualifier
- WC = Wild card
- LL = Lucky loser
- Alt = Alternate
- ITF = ITF entry
- PR = Protected ranking
- SR = Special ranking
- SE = Special exempt
- JE = Junior exempt
- JR = Junior Accelerator Programme entrant
- CO = College Accelerator Programme entrant
- NG = Next Gen Accelerator Program entrant
- w/o = Walkover
- r = Retired
- d = Defaulted

=== Draw ===
First round
1	(Zimbabwe) C Black (Russia) E Likhovtseva	7^{7}	3	6
WC	(France) A Mauresmo (Switzerland) P Schnyder	6^{3}	6	0
(France) C Dhenin (Belarus) T Poutchek	6	4	6^{5}
(Australia) E Dominikovic (Croatia) J Kostanić	2	6	7^{7}
3	(Chinese Taipei) J Lee (Indonesia) W Prakusya	2	6	6
(Italy) R Grande (Uzbekistan) I Tulyaganova	6	4	1
(Russia) L Krasnoroutskaya (Australia) N Pratt	6	6
Q	(Czech Republic) I Benešová (Czech Republic) O Blahotová	4	4
(Bulgaria) M Maleeva (Australia) T Musgrave	6	4	6
(Paraguay) R de los Ríos (Argentina) P Tarabini	4	6	1
(South Africa) N de Villiers (Kazakhstan) I Selyutina	2	1
4	(Russia) S Kuznetsova (United States) M Navratilova	6	6
WC	(United Kingdom) L Ahl (Tunisia) S Sfar	3	3
(Switzerland) E Gagliardi (South Africa) K Grant	6	6
(Venezuela) M Vento-Kabchi (Indonesia) A Widjaja	6	2	6
2	(Hungary) P Mandula (Austria) P Wartusch	1	6	4

Quarterfinals
1	(Zimbabwe) C Black (Russia) E Likhovtseva	6	6
(Australia) E Dominikovic (Croatia) J Kostanić	3	2
3	(Chinese Taipei) J Lee (Indonesia) W Prakusya	6	4	3
(Russia) L Krasnoroutskaya (Australia) N Pratt	2	6	6
(Bulgaria) M Maleeva (Australia) T Musgrave	2	0
4	(Russia) S Kuznetsova (United States) M Navratilova	6	6
(Switzerland) E Gagliardi (South Africa) K Grant	7	4	0
(Venezuela) M Vento-Kabchi (Indonesia) A Widjaja	5	6	6

Semifinals
1	(Zimbabwe) C Black (Russia) E Likhovtseva	3	6	6
(Russia) L Krasnoroutskaya (Australia) N Pratt	6	4	1
4	(Russia) S Kuznetsova (United States) M Navratilova	4	7	7
(Venezuela) M Vento-Kabchi (Indonesia) A Widjaja	6	5	5

Final
1	(Zimbabwe) C Black (Russia) E Likhovtseva	3	6^{7}
4	(Russia) S Kuznetsova (United States) M Navratilova	6	7^{9}
