= 2003 Dubai Tennis Championships and Duty Free Women's Open =

2003 Dubai Tennis Championships and Dubai Duty Free Women's Open
- Date: 24 February – 2 March (men); 17 – 22 February (women)
- Edition: 10th (men) / 3rd (women)
- Surface: Hard / outdoor
- Location: Dubai, United Arab Emirates
- Venue: Aviation Club Tennis Centre

Champions

Men's singles
- (Switzerland) Roger Federer

Women's singles
- (Belgium) Justine Henin-Hardenne

Men's doubles
- (India) Leander Paes / (Czech Republic) David Rikl

Women's doubles
- (Russia) Svetlana Kuznetsova / (United States) Martina Navratilova
- Dubai Tennis Championships Dubai Duty Free Women's Open

The 2003 Dubai Tennis Championships and Dubai Duty Free Women's Open were tennis tournaments played on outdoor hard courts at the Aviation Club Tennis Centre in Dubai in the United Arab Emirates that were part of the International Series Gold of the 2003 ATP Tour and of Tier II of the 2003 WTA Tour. The men's tournament was held from 24 February through 2 March 2003 while the women's tournament was held from 17 February through 22 February 2003. Roger Federer and Justine Henin-Hardenne won the singles titles.

== Finals ==
=== Men's singles ===
(Switzerland) Roger Federer defeated (Czech Republic) Jiří Novák 6–1, 7–6^{(7–2)}

- It was Federer's 2nd title of the year and the 10th of his career.

=== Women's singles ===
(Belgium) Justine Henin-Hardenne defeated (United States) Monica Seles 4–6, 7–6^{(7–4)}, 7–5

- It was Henin-Hardenne's 1st title of the year and the 9th of her career.

=== Men's doubles ===
(India) Leander Paes / (Czech Republic) David Rikl defeated (Zimbabwe) Wayne Black / (Zimbabwe) Kevin Ullyett 6–3, 6–0

- It was Paes' 1st title of the year and the 27th of his career. It was Rikl's 1st title of the year and the 27th of his career.

=== Women's doubles ===
(Russia) Svetlana Kuznetsova / (United States) Martina Navratilova defeated (Zimbabwe) Cara Black / (Russia) Elena Likhovtseva 6–3, 7–6^{(9–7)}

- It was Kuznetsova's 2nd title of the year and the 7th of her career. It was Navratilova's 2nd title of the year and the 343rd of her career.
