= 2002 WTA Tour Championships – Singles =

Singles
- 2002 WTA Tour Championships

Final
- Champion: (Belgium) Kim Clijsters
- Runner-up: (United States) Serena Williams
- Score: 7–5, 6–3

Details
- Draw: 16
- Seeds: 8

Events
Singles	Doubles
- WTA Tour Championships

Kim Clijsters defeated defending champion Serena Williams in the final, 7–5, 6–3 to win the singles tennis title at the 2002 WTA Tour Championships. It was her first Tour Finals singles title, fourth title of the season, and tenth career singles title.

== Seeds ==
1. (United States) Serena Williams (final)
2. (United States) Venus Williams (semifinals, retired)
3. (United States) Jennifer Capriati (semifinals)
4. (Belgium) Justine Henin (quarterfinals)
5. (Belgium) Kim Clijsters (champion)
6. (United States) Monica Seles (quarterfinals)
7. (Slovakia) Daniela Hantuchová (first round)
8. (Serbia and Montenegro) Jelena Dokić (quarterfinals)

Note:

- (France) Amélie Mauresmo had qualified but pulled out due to right knee injury.
- (Switzerland) Martina Hingis had qualified but pulled out due to left ankle injury.

== Draw ==
Key

- Q = Qualifier
- WC = Wild card
- LL = Lucky loser
- Alt = Alternate
- ITF = ITF entry
- PR = Protected ranking
- SR = Special ranking
- SE = Special exempt
- JE = Junior exempt
- JR = Junior Accelerator Programme entrant
- CO = College Accelerator Programme entrant
- NG = Next Gen Accelerator Program entrant
- w/o = Walkover
- r = Retired
- d = Defaulted

First round
1	(United States) Serena Williams	6	6
(Israel) Anna Smashnova	2	2
(Russia) Anastasia Myskina	3	4
8	(Serbia and Montenegro) Jelena Dokić	6	6
3	(United States) Jennifer Capriati	7	6
(Italy) Silvia Farina Elia	5	1
(Bulgaria) Magdalena Maleeva	6	7
7	(Slovakia) Daniela Hantuchová	2	5
5	(Belgium) Kim Clijsters	6	6
(United States) Chanda Rubin	1	2
(Russia) Elena Dementieva	3	3
4	(Belgium) Justine Henin	6	6
6	(United States) Monica Seles	3	7^{8}	6
(United States) Lindsay Davenport	6	6^{6}	3
(Switzerland) Patty Schnyder	2	6^{7}
2	(United States) Venus Williams	6	7^{9}

Quarterfinals
1	(United States) Serena Williams	7^{7}	6
8	(Serbia and Montenegro) Jelena Dokić	6^{1}	0
3	(United States) Jennifer Capriati	6	4	6
(Bulgaria) Magdalena Maleeva	2	6	1
5	(Belgium) Kim Clijsters	6	6
4	(Belgium) Justine Henin	2	1
6	(United States) Monica Seles	5	4
2	(United States) Venus Williams	7	6

Semifinals
1	(United States) Serena Williams	2	6	6
3	(United States) Jennifer Capriati	6	4	4
5	(Belgium) Kim Clijsters	5
2	(United States) Venus Williams	0^{r}

Final
1	(United States) Serena Williams	5	3
5	(Belgium) Kim Clijsters	7	6

== See also ==
- WTA Tour Championships appearances
