= 2003 Dubai Duty Free Women's Open – Singles =

Singles
- 2003 Dubai Tennis Championships and the Dubai Duty Free Women's Open

Final
- Champion: (Belgium) Justine Henin-Hardenne
- Runner-up: (United States) Monica Seles
- Score: 4–6, 7–6^{(7–4)}, 7–5

Details
- Draw: 28
- Seeds: 8

Events
Singles	men	women
Doubles	men	women
- Dubai Tennis Championships Dubai Duty Free Women's Open

Amélie Mauresmo was the defending champion, but was forced to retire during her semifinal match against Monica Seles.

Justine Henin-Hardenne won the title by defeating Monica Seles 4–6, 7–6^{(7–4)}, 7–5 in the final.

== Seeds ==
The top four seeds received a bye into the second round.

1. (Belgium) Justine Henin-Hardenne (champion)
2. (France) Amélie Mauresmo (semifinals, retired)
3. (United States) Jennifer Capriati (semifinals)
4. (United States) Monica Seles (final)
5. (Russia) Anastasia Myskina (quarterfinals)
6. (Switzerland) Patty Schnyder (second round, retired)
7. (Bulgaria) Magdalena Maleeva (second round)
8. (Greece) Eleni Daniilidou (second round)

== Draw ==
Key

- Q = Qualifier
- WC = Wild card
- LL = Lucky loser
- Alt = Alternate
- ITF = ITF entry
- PR = Protected ranking
- SR = Special ranking
- SE = Special exempt
- JE = Junior exempt
- JR = Junior Accelerator Programme entrant
- CO = College Accelerator Programme entrant
- NG = Next Gen Accelerator Program entrant
- w/o = Walkover
- r = Retired
- d = Defaulted

=== Finals ===
Semifinals
1	(Belgium) Justine Henin-Hardenne	7	4	6
3	(United States) Jennifer Capriati	5	6	4
4	(United States) Monica Seles	6	2
2	(France) Amélie Mauresmo	3	2^{r}

Final
1	(Belgium) Justine Henin-Hardenne	4	7^{7}	7
4	(United States) Monica Seles	6	6^{4}	5

=== Top half ===
First round
Q	(Germany) A Barna	6	6
(Russia) E Likhovtseva	3	0
(Thailand) T Tanasugarn	5	7	6
WC	(Indonesia) A Widjaja	7	5	4
Q	(Russia) D Safina	4	3
5	(Russia) A Myskina	6	6
(Russia) S Kuznetsova	7^{7}	6
(Croatia) I Majoli	6^{2}	2
(Italy) R Grande	3	2
(Spain) C Martínez	6	6
WC	(Tunisia) S Sfar	6^{2}	2
8	(Greece) E Daniilidou	7^{7}	6

Second round
1	(Belgium) J Henin-Hardenne	1	6	6
Q	(Germany) A Barna	6	2	4
(Thailand) T Tanasugarn	3	2
5	(Russia) A Myskina	6	6
3	(United States) J Capriati	6	6
(Russia) S Kuznetsova	2	1
(Spain) C Martínez	6	6^{2}	6
8	(Greece) E Daniilidou	4	7^{7}	2

Quarterfinals
1	(Belgium) J Henin-Hardenne	6	6
5	(Russia) A Myskina	1	4
3	(United States) J Capriati	6	6
(Spain) C Martínez	2	3

Semifinals
1	(Belgium) J Henin-Hardenne	7	4	6
3	(United States) J Capriati	5	6	4

=== Bottom half ===
First round
7	(Bulgaria) M Maleeva	7	6
WC	(Switzerland) E Gagliardi	5	2
Q	(Spain) G León García	3	6	6^{4}
(Uzbekistan) I Tulyaganova	6	4	7^{7}
(Russia) T Panova	4	0
(Italy) F Schiavone	6	6
6	(Switzerland) P Schnyder	6	7
(Australia) N Pratt	4	5
(Russia) L Krasnoroutskaya	6	6
(Italy) Ad Serra Zanetti	3	0
(Zimbabwe) C Black	0	5
Q	(Hungary) P Mandula	6	7

Second round
7	(Bulgaria) M Maleeva	6^{2}	5
(Uzbekistan) I Tulyaganova	7^{7}	7
(Italy) F Schiavone	3	2
4	(United States) M Seles	6	6
6	(Switzerland) P Schnyder	1	r
(Russia) L Krasnoroutskaya	6
Q	(Hungary) P Mandula	2	6	6^{5}
2	(France) A Mauresmo	6	2	7^{7}

Quarterfinals
(Uzbekistan) I Tulyaganova	1	5
4	(United States) M Seles	6	7
(Russia) L Krasnoroutskaya	2	4
2	(France) A Mauresmo	6	6

Semifinals
4	(United States) M Seles	6	2
2	(France) A Mauresmo	3	2	r
