= 2003 WTA Tour Championships – Doubles =

Doubles
- 2003 WTA Tour Championships

Final
- Champion: (Spain) Virginia Ruano Pascual (Argentina) Paola Suárez
- Runner-up: (Belgium) Kim Clijsters (Japan) Ai Sugiyama
- Score: 6–4, 3–6, 6–3

Details
- Draw: 8
- Seeds: 4

Events
Singles	Doubles
- WTA Tour Championships

Virginia Ruano Pascual and Paola Suárez defeated Kim Clijsters and Ai Sugiyama in the final, 6–4, 3–6, 6–3 to win the doubles tennis title at the 2003 WTA Tour Championships.

Elena Dementieva and Janette Husárová were the reigning champions, but did not qualify this year.

== Seeds ==
1. (Belgium) Kim Clijsters / (Japan) Ai Sugiyama (final)
2. (Spain) Virginia Ruano Pascual / (Argentina) Paola Suárez (champions)
3. (Russia) Svetlana Kuznetsova / (United States) Martina Navratilova (semifinals)
4. (Zimbabwe) Cara Black / (Russia) Elena Likhovtseva (semifinals)

== Draw ==
Key

- Q = Qualifier
- WC = Wild card
- LL = Lucky loser
- Alt = Alternate
- ITF = ITF entry
- PR = Protected ranking
- SR = Special ranking
- SE = Special exempt
- JE = Junior exempt
- JR = Junior Accelerator Programme entrant
- CO = College Accelerator Programme entrant
- NG = Next Gen Accelerator Program entrant
- w/o = Walkover
- r = Retired
- d = Defaulted

=== Finals ===
Semifinals
1	(Belgium) Kim Clijsters (Japan) Ai Sugiyama	6	6
4	(Zimbabwe) Cara Black (Russia) Elena Likhovtseva	3	4
3	(Russia) Svetlana Kuznetsova (United States) Martina Navratilova	4	4
2	(Spain) Virginia Ruano Pascual (Argentina) Paola Suárez	6	6

Final
1	(Belgium) Kim Clijsters (Japan) Ai Sugiyama	4	6	3
2	(Spain) Virginia Ruano Pascual (Argentina) Paola Suárez	6	3	6
