= 2003 WTA Tour Championships – Singles =

Singles
- 2003 WTA Tour Championships

Final
- Champion: (Belgium) Kim Clijsters
- Runner-up: (France) Amélie Mauresmo
- Score: 6–2, 6–0

Details
- Draw: 8 (RR + elimination)
- Seeds: 8

Events
Singles	Doubles
- WTA Tour Championships

Defending champion Kim Clijsters successfully defended her title, defeating Amélie Mauresmo in the final, 6–2, 6–0 to win the singles title at the 2003 WTA Tour Championships. It was her second Tour Finals title in a row, (Clijsters later won again in 2010) her ninth title of the season, and the 19th of her career.

== Seeds ==
1. (1) (Belgium) Kim Clijsters (champion)
2. (2) (Belgium) Justine Henin-Hardenne (semifinals)
3. (5) (United States) Jennifer Capriati (semifinals)
4. (6) (France) Amélie Mauresmo (final)
5. (8) (Russia) Anastasia Myskina (round robin)
6. (9) (Russia) Elena Dementieva (round robin)
7. (10) (United States) Chanda Rubin (round robin)
8. (11) (Japan) Ai Sugiyama (round robin)

Note:

- (United States) Serena Williams had qualified but pulled out due to left knee surgery.
- (United States) Lindsay Davenport had qualified but pulled out due to left foot surgery.
- (United States) Venus Williams had qualified but pulled out due to abdominal injury.

== Alternates ==
1. (Russia) Nadia Petrova (not used)
2. (Russia) Vera Zvonareva (not used)

== Draw ==
Key

- Q = Qualifier
- WC = Wild card
- LL = Lucky loser
- Alt = Alternate
- ITF = ITF entry
- PR = Protected ranking
- SR = Special ranking
- SE = Special exempt
- JE = Junior exempt
- JR = Junior Accelerator Programme entrant
- CO = College Accelerator Programme entrant
- NG = Next Gen Accelerator Program entrant
- w/o = Walkover
- r = Retired
- d = Defaulted

=== Finals ===
Semifinals
1	(Belgium) Kim Clijsters	4	6	6
3	(United States) Jennifer Capriati	6	3	0
4	(France) Amélie Mauresmo	7^{7}	3	6
2	(Belgium) Justine Henin-Hardenne	6^{2}	6	3

Final
1	(Belgium) Kim Clijsters	6	6
4	(France) Amélie Mauresmo	2	0

=== Red group ===
		(Belgium) Clijsters	(France) Mauresmo	(Russia) Dementieva	(United States) Rubin	RR; W–L	Set; W–L	Game; W–L	Standings
1	(Belgium) Kim Clijsters		3–6, 6–4, 6–4	6–2, 6–2	6–4, 6–4	3–0	6–1 (86%)	39–26 (60%)	1
4	(France) Amélie Mauresmo	6–3, 4–6, 4–6		6–3, 6–2	6–4, 4–6, 2–6	1–2	4–4 (50%)	38–36 (51%)	2
6	(Russia) Elena Dementieva	2–6, 2–6	3–6, 2–6		4–6, 7–5, 6–1	1–2	2–5 (29%)	26–36 (42%)	4
7	(United States) Chanda Rubin	4–6, 4–6	4–6, 6–4, 6–2	6–4, 5–7, 1–6		1–2	3–5 (38%)	36–41 (47%)	3

Standings are determined by: 1. number of wins; 2. number of matches; 3. in two-players-ties, head-to-head records; 4. in three-players-ties, percentage of sets won, or of games won; 5. steering-committee decision.

=== Black group ===
		(Belgium) Henin-Hardenne	(United States) Capriati	(Russia) Myskina	(Japan) Sugiyama	RR; W–L	Set; W–L	Game; W–L	Standings
2	(Belgium) Justine Henin-Hardenne		6–2, 6–1	7–5, 5–7, 7–5	2–6, 4–6	2–1	4–3 (57%)	37–32 (54%)	1
3	(United States) Jennifer Capriati	2–6, 1–6		7–5, 5–7, 6–4	7–5, 7–6^{(7–3)}	2–1	4–3 (57%)	35–39 (47%)	2
5	(Russia) Anastasia Myskina	5–7, 7–5, 5–7	5–7, 7–5, 4–6		6–4, 6–3	1–2	4–4 (50%)	45–44 (51%)	3
8	(Japan) Ai Sugiyama	6–2, 6–4	5–7, 6–7^{(3–7)}	4–6, 3–6		1–2	2–4 (33%)	30–32 (48%)	4

Standings are determined by: 1. number of wins; 2. number of matches; 3. in two-players-ties, head-to-head records; 4. in three-players-ties, percentage of sets won, or of games won; 5. steering-committee decision.

== See also ==
- WTA Tour Championships appearances
