= 2006 WTA Tour Championships – Singles =

Singles
- 2006 WTA Tour Championships

Final
- Champion: (Belgium) Justine Henin-Hardenne
- Runner-up: (France) Amélie Mauresmo
- Score: 6–4, 6–3

Details
- Draw: 8 (RR + elimination)
- Seeds: 8

Events
Singles	Doubles
- WTA Tour Championships

Justine Henin-Hardenne defeated defending champion Amélie Mauresmo in the final, 6–4, 6–3 to win the singles tennis title at the 2006 WTA Tour Championships. It was her first Tour Finals title. Henin-Hardenne also secured the year-end world No. 1 ranking by reaching the final.

== Seeds ==
* As of October 30, 2006.

1. (France) Amélie Mauresmo (final)
2. (Russia) Maria Sharapova (semifinals)
3. (Belgium) Justine Henin-Hardenne (champion)
4. (Russia) Svetlana Kuznetsova (round robin)
5. (Russia) Nadia Petrova (round robin)
6. (Belgium) Kim Clijsters (semifinals)
7. (Russia) Elena Dementieva (round robin)
8. (Switzerland) Martina Hingis (round robin)

== Alternates ==
1. (Switzerland) Patty Schnyder (not used)
2. (Russia) Dinara Safina (not used)

== Draw ==
=== Finals ===
Semifinals
1	(France) Amélie Mauresmo	6	3	6
6	(Belgium) Kim Clijsters	2	6	3
2	(Russia) Maria Sharapova	2	6^{5}
3	(Belgium) Justine Henin-Hardenne	6	7^{7}

Final
1	(France) Amélie Mauresmo	4	3
3	(Belgium) Justine Henin-Hardenne	6	6

=== Red group ===
		(Russia) Sharapova	(Russia) Kuznetsova	(Belgium) Clijsters	(Russia) Dementieva	RR; W–L	Set; W–L	Game; W–L	Standings
2	(Russia) Maria Sharapova		6–1, 6–4	6–4, 6–4	6–1, 6–4	3–0	6–0		1
4	(Russia) Svetlana Kuznetsova	1–6, 4–6		1–6, 1–6	7–5, 6–3	1–2	2–4		3
6	(Belgium) Kim Clijsters	4–6, 4–6	6–1, 6–1		6–4, 6–0	2–1	4–2		2
7	(Russia) Elena Dementieva	1–6, 4–6	5–7, 3–6	4–6, 0–6		0–3	0–6		4

Standings are determined by: 1. number of wins; 2. number of matches; 3. in two-players-ties, head-to-head records; 4. in three-players-ties, percentage of sets won, or of games won; 5. steering-committee decision.

=== Yellow group ===
		(France) Mauresmo	(Belgium) Henin-Hardenne	(Russia) Petrova	(Switzerland) Hingis	RR; W–L	Set; W–L	Game; W–L	Standings
1	(France) Amélie Mauresmo		4–6, 7–6^{(7–3)}, 6–2	2–6, 2–6	3–6, 6–1, 6–4	2–1	4–4		1
3	(Belgium) Justine Henin-Hardenne	6–4, 6–7^{(3–7)}, 2–6		6–4, 6–4	6–2, 6–7^{(5–7)}, 6–1	2–1	5–3		2
5	(Russia) Nadia Petrova	6–2, 6–2	4–6, 4–6		4–6, 6–3, 3–6	1–2	3–4		4
8	(Switzerland) Martina Hingis	6–3, 1–6, 4–6	2–6, 7–6^{(7–5)}, 1–6	6–4, 3–6, 6–3		1–2	4–5		3

Standings are determined by: 1. number of wins; 2. number of matches; 3. in two-players-ties, head-to-head records; 4. in three-players-ties, percentage of sets won, or of games won; 5. steering-committee decision.

== See also ==
- WTA Tour Championships appearances
