= 2003 Porsche Tennis Grand Prix – Singles =

Singles
- 2003 Porsche Tennis Grand Prix

Final
- Champion: (Belgium) Kim Clijsters
- Runner-up: (Belgium) Justine Henin-Hardenne
- Score: 5–7, 6–4, 6–2

Events
Singles	Doubles
← 2002 ·	Women's Stuttgart Open	· 2004 →

Kim Clijsters was the defending champion, and successfully defended her title by defeating compatriot Justine Henin-Hardenne 5–7, 6–4, 6–2 in the final.

== Seeds ==
The first four seeds received a bye into the second round.

1. (Belgium) Kim Clijsters (champion)
2. (Belgium) Justine Henin-Hardenne (final)
3. (United States) Lindsay Davenport (quarterfinals)
4. (United States) Jennifer Capriati (second round)
5. (France) Amélie Mauresmo (quarterfinals)
6. (Russia) Elena Dementieva (quarterfinals)
7. (United States) Chanda Rubin (second round)
8. (Russia) Anastasia Myskina (second round)

== Draw ==
=== Key ===
- Q = Qualifier
- WC = Wild card
- LL = Lucky loser
- Alt = Alternate
- SE = Special exempt
- PR = Protected ranking
- ITF = ITF entry
- JE = Junior exempt
- w/o = Walkover
- r = Retired
- d = Defaulted
- SR = Special ranking

=== Finals ===
Semifinals
1	(Belgium) Kim Clijsters	7^{7}	6
WC	(France) Mary Pierce	6^{2}	0
(Russia) Elena Bovina	2	4
2	(Belgium) Justine Henin-Hardenne	6	6

Final
1	(Belgium) Kim Clijsters	5	6	6
2	(Belgium) Justine Henin-Hardenne	7	4	2

=== Top half ===
First round
(Slovakia) D Hantuchová	6	6
Q	(United States) L Raymond	3	4
(Switzerland) P Schnyder	7	7
Q	(Switzerland) M Casanova	5	5
(United States) M Shaughnessy	6^{4}	2
5	(France) A Mauresmo	7^{7}	6
WC	(France) M Pierce	6	6
Q	(Zimbabwe) C Black	2	0
(Federal Republic of Yugoslavia) J Dokic	5	0
(Bulgaria) M Maleeva	7	6
(Russia) V Zvonareva	6	4	3
7	(United States) C Rubin	1	6	6

Second round
1	(Belgium) K Clijsters	6	6
(Slovakia) D Hantuchová	1	1
(Switzerland) P Schnyder	2	6^{3}
5	(France) A Mauresmo	6	7^{7}
4	(United States) J Capriati	4	2
WC	(France) M Pierce	6	6
(Bulgaria) M Maleeva	6	6
7	(United States) C Rubin	3	4

Quarterfinals
1	(Belgium) K Clijsters	6	6
5	(France) A Mauresmo	4	3
WC	(France) M Pierce	7	7^{8}
(Bulgaria) M Maleeva	5	6^{6}

Semifinals
1	(Belgium) K Clijsters	7^{7}	6
WC	(France) M Pierce	6^{2}	0

=== Bottom half ===
First round
8	(Russia) A Myskina	0	6	4
(United States) A Stevenson	6	1	0^{r}
Q	(Colombia) F Zuluaga	2	4
(Russia) E Bovina	6	6
WC	(Israel) A Pistolesi	2	1
(Japan) A Sugiyama	6	6
6	(Russia) E Dementieva	6	6
(Russia) N Petrova	3	3
(Italy) S Farina Elia	7^{7}	7^{7}
(South Africa) A Coetzer	6^{4}	6^{4}
WC	(Germany) AL Grönefeld	6^{5}	2
(Spain) C Martínez	7^{7}	6

Second round
8	(Russia) A Myskina	2	3
(Russia) E Bovina	6	6
(Japan) A Sugiyama	2	4
3	(United States) L Davenport	6	6
6	(Russia) E Dementieva	6	2
(Italy) S Farina Elia	0	1^{r}
(Spain) C Martínez	0	6^{1}
2	(Belgium) J Henin-Hardenne	6	7^{7}

Quarterfinals
(Russia) E Bovina	6	6
3	(United States) L Davenport	3	2
6	(Russia) E Dementieva	5	0
2	(Belgium) J Henin-Hardenne	7	6

Semifinals
(Russia) E Bovina	2	4
2	(Belgium) J Henin-Hardenne	6	6
