= 2003 NASDAQ-100 Open – Women's singles =

Women's singles
- 2003 NASDAQ-100 Open

Final
- Champion: (United States) Serena Williams
- Runner-up: (United States) Jennifer Capriati
- Score: 4–6, 6–4, 6–1

Details
- Draw: 96 (8WC/12Q/1LL)
- Seeds: 32

Events
Singles	men	women
Doubles	men	women
← 2002 ·	Miami Open	· 2004 →

Defending champion Serena Williams defeated Jennifer Capriati in a rematch of the previous year's final, 4–6, 6–4, 6–1 to win the women's singles tennis title at the 2003 Miami Open.

This was Capriati’s third consecutive final at the Miami Open, also losing the 2001 final to Venus Williams.

== Seeds ==
All seeds received a bye into the second round.

1. (United States) Serena Williams (champion)
2. (United States) Venus Williams (fourth round)
3. (Belgium) Kim Clijsters (semifinals)
4. (Belgium) Justine Henin-Hardenne (quarterfinals)
5. (Slovakia) Daniela Hantuchová (second round)
6. (United States) Jennifer Capriati (final)
7. (United States) Lindsay Davenport (fourth round, retired)
8. (France) Amélie Mauresmo (fourth round)
9. (Federal Republic of Yugoslavia) Jelena Dokić (quarterfinals)
10. (United States) Monica Seles (withdrew)
11. (Russia) Anastasia Myskina (second round)
12. (United States) Chanda Rubin (semifinals)
13. (Bulgaria) Magdalena Maleeva (third round)
14. (Greece) Eleni Daniilidou (third round)
15. (Israel) Anna Pistolesi (fourth round)
16. (Russia) Elena Bovina (second round)
17. (Japan) Ai Sugiyama (third round)
18. (South Africa) Amanda Coetzer (second round)
19. (Russia) Elena Dementieva (second round)
20. (Italy) Silvia Farina Elia (third round)
21. (France) Nathalie Dechy (third round)
22. (United States) Lisa Raymond (third round)
23. (United States) Meghann Shaughnessy (quarterfinals)
24. (United States) Alexandra Stevenson (second round)
25. (Russia) Tatiana Panova (third round)
26. (Argentina) Clarisa Fernández (third round)
27. (Argentina) Paola Suárez (third round)
28. (Russia) Elena Likhovtseva (third round)
29. (Croatia) Iva Majoli (second round)
30. (Thailand) Tamarine Tanasugarn (third round)
31. (United States) Laura Granville (third round)
32. (Switzerland) Marie-Gayanay Mikaelian (second round)

== Draw ==
=== Key ===
- Q = Qualifier
- WC = Wild card
- LL = Lucky loser
- Alt = Alternate
- ITF = ITF entry
- PR = Protected ranking
- SR = Special ranking
- SE = Special exempt
- JE = Junior exempt
- JR = Junior Accelerator Programme entrant
- CO = College Accelerator Programme entrant
- NG = Next Gen Accelerator Program entrant
- w/o = Walkover
- r = Retired
- d = Defaulted

=== Finals ===
Quarterfinals
1	(United States) Serena Williams	6	6
Q	(France) Marion Bartoli	1	2
3	(Belgium) Kim Clijsters	6	6
9	(Federal Republic of Yugoslavia) Jelena Dokić	2	0
12	(United States) Chanda Rubin	6	6
4	(Belgium) Justine Henin-Hardenne	3	2
6	(United States) Jennifer Capriati	4	7	6
23	(United States) Meghann Shaughnessy	6	6^{5}	4

Semifinals
1	(United States) Serena Williams	6	6
3	(Belgium) Kim Clijsters	4	2
12	(United States) Chanda Rubin	2	4
6	(United States) Jennifer Capriati	6	6

Final
1	(United States) Serena Williams	4	6	6
6	(United States) Jennifer Capriati	6	4	1

=== Top half ===
==== Section 1 ====
First round
(Italy) F Schiavone	6	6
(Germany) B Rittner	3	3
Q	(Federal Republic of Yugoslavia) J Janković	6^{4}	1
(United States) M Irvin	7	6
(France) É Loit	7	2	2
(Australia) N Pratt	5	6	6
(Uzbekistan) I Tulyaganova	6	6
Q	(Ukraine) T Perebiynis	4	2

Second round
1	(United States) S Williams	7	6
(Italy) F Schiavone	5	1
(United States) M Irvin	6	3	3
25	(Russia) T Panova	4	6	6
19	(Russia) E Dementieva	5	4
(Australia) N Pratt	7	6
(Uzbekistan) I Tulyaganova	6	7
16	(Russia) E Bovina	4	5

Third round
1	(United States) S Williams	6	6
25	(Russia) T Panova	2	1
(Australia) N Pratt	6	1	3
(Uzbekistan) I Tulyaganova	4	6	6

Fourth round
1	(United States) S Williams	6	6
(Uzbekistan) I Tulyaganova	0	4

==== Section 2 ====
First round
WC	(United States) A Baker	0	0
Q	(France) M Bartoli	6	6
Q	(Spain) M Sánchez Lorenzo	6	6
Q	(Canada) M-È Pelletier	2	1
(Italy) F Pennetta	2	6	6
(Indonesia) A Widjaja	6	4	3
(Slovenia) T Pisnik	7	2	3
(Spain) C Torrens Valero	5	6	6

Second round
LL	(Australia) E Dominikovic	6	6^{1}	1
Q	(France) M Bartoli	4	7	6
Q	(Spain) M Sánchez Lorenzo	6^{2}	6	6
24	(United States) A Stevenson	7	1	2
29	(Croatia) I Majoli	2	3
(Italy) F Pennetta	6	6
(Spain) C Torrens Valero	2	1
7	(United States) L Davenport	6	6

Third round
Q	(France) M Bartoli	6	7
Q	(Spain) M Sánchez Lorenzo	2	5
(Italy) F Pennetta	4	6	1
7	(United States) L Davenport	6	2	6

Fourth round
Q	(France) M Bartoli	6
7	(United States) L Davenport	0	r

==== Section 3 ====
First round
WC	(United States) J Jackson	4	1
(South Korea) YJ Cho	6	6
(Slovenia) M Matevzic	2	0
(Zimbabwe) C Black	6	6
Q	(Luxembourg) C Schaul	6	6
WC	(China) P Shuai	4	4
(Colombia) F Zuluaga	6	6
(Slovenia) A Roesch	1	0

Second round
3	(Belgium) K Clijsters	6	6
(South Korea) YJ Cho	2	2
(Zimbabwe) C Black	1	0
27	(Argentina) P Suárez	6	6
22	(United States) L Raymond	6	6
Q	(Luxembourg) C Schaul	2	4
(Colombia) F Zuluaga	2	4
15	(Israel) A Pistolesi	6	6

Third round
3	(Belgium) K Clijsters	6	6
27	(Argentina) P Suárez	2	2
22	(United States) L Raymond	6	2	4
15	(Israel) A Pistolesi	4	6	6

Fourth round
3	(Belgium) K Clijsters	6	6
15	(Israel) A Pistolesi	1	1

==== Section 4 ====
First round
(Spain) V Ruano Pascual	3	2
(Russia) S Kuznetsova	6	6
WC	(Russia) M Sharapova	6^{3}	1
(Belgium) E Callens	7	6
(Italy) T Garbin	6^{9}	4
(Croatia) S Talaja	7	7
(Austria) B Schett	7	2	6^{3}
(Australia) A Molik	6^{5}	6	7

Second round
9	(Federal Republic of Yugoslavia) J Dokić	7	6
(Russia) S Kuznetsova	6^{3}	1
(Belgium) E Callens	4	3
21	(France) N Dechy	6	6
28	(Russia) E Likhovtseva	6^{1}	6	6
(Croatia) S Talaja	7	2	4
(Australia) A Molik	2	7	6
5	(Slovakia) D Hantuchová	6	5	0

Third round
9	(Federal Republic of Yugoslavia) J Dokić	6	6
21	(France) N Dechy	3	2
28	(Russia) E Likhovtseva	6^{7}	3
(Australia) A Molik	7	6

Fourth round
9	(Federal Republic of Yugoslavia) J Dokić	6	6
(Australia) A Molik	1	4

=== Bottom half ===
==== Section 5 ====
First round
(Czech Republic) K Koukalová	6	5	0
Q	(Spain) M Marrero	4	7	6
(Italy) R Grande	2	6	3
(Slovenia) T Poutchek	6	1	6
(Slovenia) K Srebotnik	6	2	6
WC	(France) T Golovin	1	6	4
(South Africa) J Kruger	6	3	2
WC	(United States) C Gullickson	2	6	6

Second round
8	(France) A Mauresmo	2	6	7
(Spain) M Marrero	6	2	6^{1}
(Belarus) T Poutchek	5	5
26	(Argentina) C Fernández	7	7
20	(Italy) S Farina Elia	2	6	4
(Slovenia) K Srebotnik	6	3	3^{r}
WC	(United States) C Gullickson	2	5
12	(United States) C Rubin	6	7

Third round
8	(France) A Mauresmo	6	6
26	(Argentina) C Fernández	2	0
20	(Italy) S Farina Elia	2	2
12	(United States) C Rubin	6	6

Fourth round
8	(France) A Mauresmo	0	2
12	(United States) C Rubin	6	6

==== Section 6 ====
First round
(United States) J Craybas	4	7	2
Q	(Sweden) Å Svensson	6	6^{3}	0^{r}
(Germany) M Müller	2	5
Q	(Germany) M Weingärtner	6	7
(Czech Republic) D Chládková	6	6
(Russia) V Zvonareva	4	4
(Austria) P Wartusch	0	3
Q	(Russia) V Douchevina	6	6

Second round
14	(Greece) E Daniilidou	6	6
(United States) J Craybas	4	3
Q	(Germany) M Weingärtner	6	6
18	(South Africa) A Coetzer	1	4
30	(Thailand) T Tanasugarn	3	6
(Czech Republic) D Chládková	2	2
Q	(Russia) V Douchevina	3	2
4	(Belgium) J Henin-Hardenne	6	6

Third round
14	(Greece) E Daniilidou	6^{6}	3
Q	(Germany) M Weingärtner	7	6
30	(Thailand) T Tanasugarn	2	0
4	(Belgium) J Henin-Hardenne	6	6

Fourth round
Q	(Germany) M Weingärtner	1	2
4	(Belgium) J Henin-Hardenne	6	6

==== Section 7 ====
First round
(Czech Republic) I Benešová	4	6^{6}
Q	(Russia) A Rodionova	6	7
(Czech Republic) D Bedáňová	6	6
(France) S Foretz	3	3
(Russia) D Safina	6	6
(Russia) A Kournikova	1	4
Q	(United States) M Washington	7	4	0
WC	(United States) S Taylor	5	6	6

Second round
6	(United States) J Capriati	7	6
Q	(Russia) A Rodionova	6^{3}	2
(Czech Republic) D Bedáňová	2	3
31	(United States) L Granville	6	6
17	(Japan) A Sugiyama	3	7	6
(Russia) D Safina	6	5	2
WC	(United States) S Taylor	7	6
11	(Russia) A Myskina	5	4

Third round
6	(United States) J Capriati	7	6
31	(United States) L Granville	6^{4}	0
17	(Japan) A Sugiyama	6	4	3
WC	(United States) S Taylor	2	6	6

Fourth round
6	(United States) J Capriati	6	6
WC	(United States) S Taylor	1	0

==== Section 8 ====
First round
(United States) M Tu	6	6^{4}	7
WC	(United States) B Mattek	1	7	6^{4}
(Russia) A Jidkova	6	7
(Germany) A Barna	4	6^{6}
(France) V Razzano	4	0
(Switzerland) E Gagliardi	6	6
(Japan) S Asagoe	6	6
(Spain) M Serna	4	4

Second round
13	(Bulgaria) M Maleeva	6	6
(United States) M Tu	2	1
(Russia) A Jidkova	6	4	3
23	(United States) M Shaughnessy	4	6	6
32	(Switzerland) M-G Mikaelian	3	2
(Switzerland) E Gagliardi	6	6
(Japan) S Asagoe	3	1
2	(United States) V Williams	6	6

Third round
13	(Bulgaria) M Maleeva	4	4
23	(United States) M Shaughnessy	6	6
(Switzerland) E Gagliardi	3	2
2	(United States) V Williams	6	6

Fourth round
23	(United States) M Shaughnessy	7	6
2	(United States) V Williams	6^{2}	1

== Qualifying ==
=== Qualifying seeds ===
1. (Hungary) Petra Mandula (first round)
2. (Spain) Marta Marrero (qualified)
3. (Australia) Evie Dominikovic (qualifying competition, lucky loser)
4. (Sweden) Åsa Svensson (qualified)
5. (Spain) María Sánchez Lorenzo (qualified)
6. (Madagascar) Dally Randriantefy (first round)
7. (Paraguay) Rossana de los Ríos (first round)
8. (France) Marion Bartoli (qualified)
9. (Germany) Marlene Weingärtner (qualified)
10. (Croatia) Jelena Kostanić (qualifying competition)
11. (United States) Ashley Harkleroad (qualifying competition)
12. (Russia) Evgenia Kulikovskaya (first round)
13. (France) Stéphanie Cohen-Aloro (first round)
14. (Japan) Saori Obata (first round)
15. (Slovakia) Martina Suchá (first round)
16. (Czech Republic) Libuše Průšová (first round)
17. (United States) Lindsay Lee-Waters (qualifying competition)
18. (United States) Ansley Cargill (qualifying competition)
19. (Russia) Nadia Petrova (qualifying competition)
20. (United States) Samantha Reeves (first round)
21. (Venezuela) Milagros Sequera (first round)
22. (Slovakia) Ľubomíra Kurhajcová (qualifying competition)
23. (Canada) Maureen Drake (qualifying competition)
24. (Indonesia) Wynne Prakusya (first round)

=== Qualifiers ===
1. (United States) Mashona Washington
2. (Spain) Marta Marrero
3. (Luxembourg) Claudine Schaul
4. (Sweden) Åsa Svensson
5. (Spain) María Sánchez Lorenzo
6. (Federal Republic of Yugoslavia) Jelena Janković
7. (Russia) Vera Dushevina
8. (France) Marion Bartoli
9. (Germany) Marlene Weingärtner
10. (Ukraine) Tatiana Perebiynis
11. (Russia) Anastasia Rodionova
12. (Canada) Marie-Ève Pelletier

=== Lucky loser ===
1. (Australia) Evie Dominikovic

=== Qualifying draw ===
==== First qualifier ====
First round
1	(Hungary) Petra Mandula	6	5	3
(United States) Mashona Washington	4	7	6
(Hungary) Anikó Kapros	6	2	1
17	(United States) Lindsay Lee-Waters	3	6	6

Qualifying competition
(United States) Mashona Washington	4	6	6
17	(United States) Lindsay Lee-Waters	6	2	4

==== Second qualifier ====
First round
2	(Spain) Marta Marrero	6	6
(Germany) Gréta Arn	1	0
(Czech Republic) Sandra Kleinová	1	4
19	(Russia) Nadia Petrova	6	6

Qualifying competition
2	(Spain) Marta Marrero	3	7^{7}	6
19	(Russia) Nadia Petrova	6	6^{5}	2

==== Third qualifier ====
First round
3	(Australia) Evie Dominikovic	6	4	6
(Israel) Tzipora Obziler	4	6	4
(Luxembourg) Claudine Schaul	6	6
15	(Slovakia) Martina Suchá	1	2

Qualifying competition
3	(Australia) Evie Dominikovic	4	1
(Luxembourg) Claudine Schaul	6	6

==== Fourth qualifier ====
First round
4	(Sweden) Åsa Svensson	6	7^{7}
(Italy) Adriana Serra Zanetti	1	6^{2}
(Canada) Vanessa Webb	3	6^{5}
22	(Slovakia) Ľubomíra Kurhajcová	6	7^{7}

Qualifying competition
4	(Sweden) Åsa Svensson	4	6	6
22	(Slovakia) Ľubomíra Kurhajcová	6	3	1

==== Fifth qualifier ====
First round
5	(Spain) María Sánchez Lorenzo	7	7^{7}
(Japan) Akiko Morigami	5	6^{4}
(Italy) Mara Santangelo	6	7^{7}
21	(Venezuela) Milagros Sequera	0	6^{2}

Qualifying competition
5	(Spain) María Sánchez Lorenzo	3	7	7^{7}
(Italy) Mara Santangelo	6	5	6^{3}

==== Sixth qualifier ====
First round
6	(Madagascar) Dally Randriantefy	5	2
WC	(Federal Republic of Yugoslavia) Jelena Janković	7	6
WC	(United States) Shenay Perry	6	6
16	(Czech Republic) Libuše Průšová	3	1

Qualifying competition
WC	(Federal Republic of Yugoslavia) Jelena Janković	6	6
WC	(United States) Shenay Perry	3	1

==== Seventh qualifier ====
First round
7	(Paraguay) Rossana de los Ríos	2	0
WC	(Russia) Vera Dushevina	6	6
(Czech Republic) Zuzana Ondrášková	6	6
13	(France) Stéphanie Cohen-Aloro	1	2

Qualifying competition
WC	(Russia) Vera Dushevina	6	1	6
(Czech Republic) Zuzana Ondrášková	4	6	2

==== Eighth qualifier ====
First round
8	(France) Marion Bartoli	6	6^{2}	6
(Netherlands) Seda Noorlander	0	7^{7}	3
(Ukraine) Julia Vakulenko	4	3
18	(United States) Ansley Cargill	6	6

Qualifying competition
8	(France) Marion Bartoli	6	6
18	(United States) Ansley Cargill	0	3

==== Ninth qualifier ====
First round
9	(Germany) Marlene Weingärtner	6	6
(Hungary) Zsófia Gubacsi	1	1
WC	(Argentina) Gisela Dulko	1	2
23	(Canada) Maureen Drake	6	6

Qualifying competition
9	(Germany) Marlene Weingärtner	7^{9}	6
23	(Canada) Maureen Drake	6^{7}	2

==== Tenth qualifier ====
First round
10	(Croatia) Jelena Kostanić	6	7^{7}
WC	(United States) Cory Ann Avants	4	6^{1}
(Ukraine) Tatiana Perebiynis	6^{5}	6	6
14	(Japan) Saori Obata	7^{7}	1	2

Qualifying competition
10	(Croatia) Jelena Kostanić	1	4
(Ukraine) Tatiana Perebiynis	6	6

==== Eleventh qualifier ====
First round
11	(United States) Ashley Harkleroad	6	6
(Belarus) Olga Barabanschikova	2	3
(Russia) Anastasia Rodionova	7	7
24	(Indonesia) Wynne Prakusya	5	5

Qualifying competition
11	(United States) Ashley Harkleroad	4	6	6^{3}
(Russia) Anastasia Rodionova	6	3	7^{7}

==== Twelfth qualifier ====
First round
12	(Russia) Evgenia Kulikovskaya	5	1
(Slovakia) Eva Fislová	7	6
WC	(Canada) Marie-Ève Pelletier	7^{7}	4	7^{7}
20	(United States) Samantha Reeves	6^{4}	6	6^{5}

Qualifying competition
(Slovakia) Eva Fislová	5	3
WC	(Canada) Marie-Ève Pelletier	7	6
