= Cara Black career statistics =

Career finals
Discipline	Type	Won	Lost	Total
Singles	Grand Slam	–	–	–
Singles	Summer Olympics	–	–	–
Singles	WTA Finals (Note: Formerly known as: Virginia Slims Championships (until 1995); WTA Tour Championships (until 2014))	–	–	–
Singles	WTA 1000 (Note: Formerly known as: Category 4 & 5 & 6 (until 1990); Tier I (until 2009); WTA Premier Mandatory and 5 (until 2021))	–	–	–
Singles	WTA 500 (Note: Formerly known as: Category 3 (until 1990); Tier II (until 2009); WTA Premier (until 2021))	–	–	–
Singles	WTA 250 (Note: Formerly known as: Category 1 & 2 (until 1990); Tier III & IV & V (until 2009); WTA International (until 2021))	1	1	2
Singles	Total	1	1	2
Doubles	Grand Slam	5	4	9
Doubles	Summer Olympics	–	–	–
Doubles	WTA Finals	3	6	9
Doubles	WTA 1000	17	15	32
Doubles	WTA 500	23	16	39
Doubles	WTA 250	12	8	20
Doubles	Total	60	49	109
Mixed doubles	Grand Slam	5	3	8
Mixed doubles	Total	5	3	8
Total		66	53	119

This is a list of the main career statistics of professional Zimbabwean tennis player Cara Black.

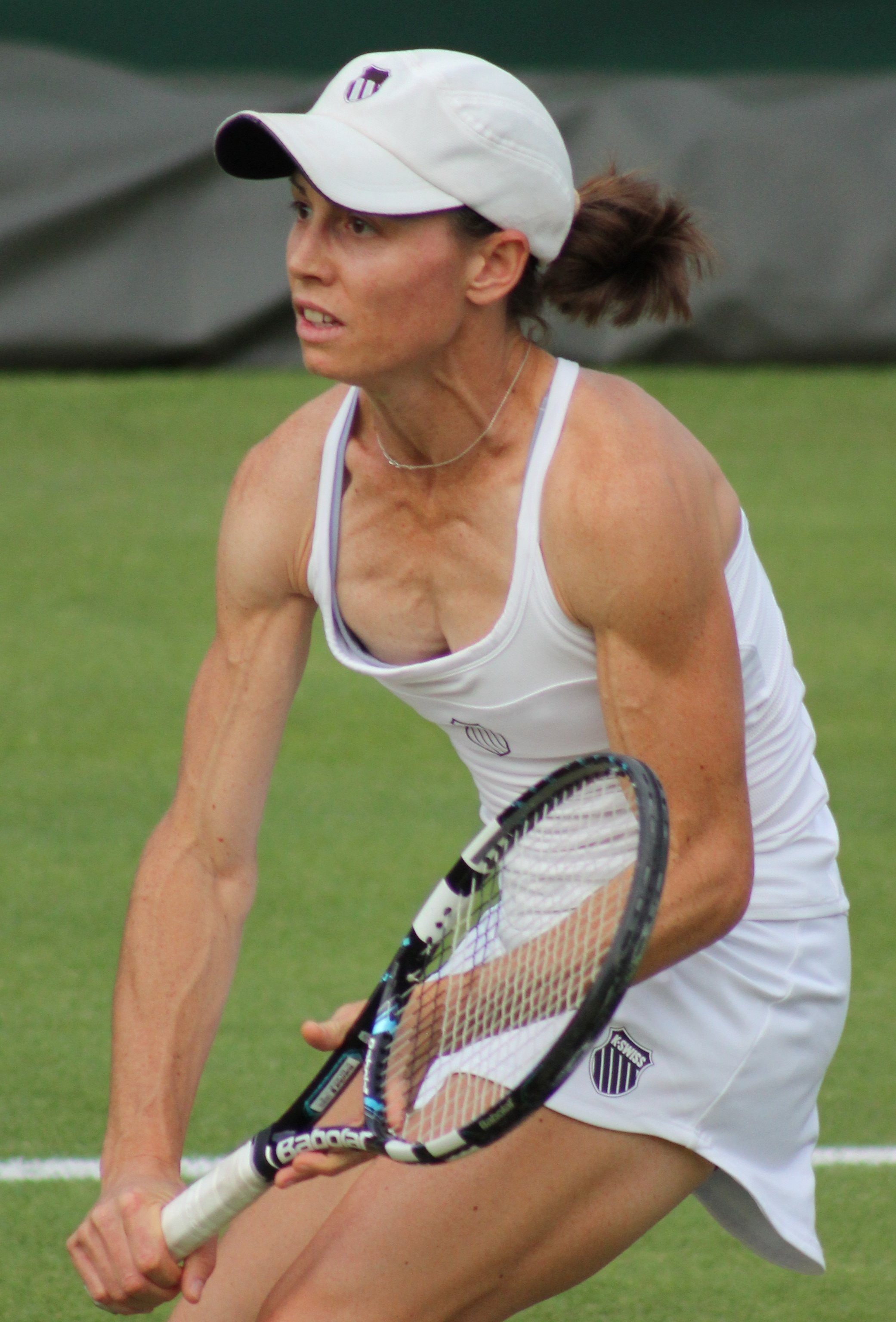
Black at the 2013 Wimbledon Championships.

== Grand Slam performance timelines ==
Key
W	F	SF	QF	#R	RR	Q#	P#	DNQ	A	Z#	PO	G	S	B	NMS	NTI	P	NH

(W) winner; (F) finalist; (SF) semifinalist; (QF) quarterfinalist; (#R) rounds 4, 3, 2, 1; (RR) round-robin stage; (Q#) qualification round; (P#) preliminary round; (DNQ) did not qualify; (A) absent; (Z#) Davis/Fed Cup Zonal Group (with number indication) or (PO) play-off; (G) gold, (S) silver or (B) bronze Olympic/Paralympic medal; (NMS) not a Masters tournament; (NTI) not a Tier I tournament; (P) postponed; (NH) not held; (SR) strike rate (events won / competed); (W–L) win–loss record.

Only main-draw results in WTA Tour, Grand Slam tournaments, Billie Jean King Cup (Fed Cup), Hopman Cup and Olympic Games are included in win–loss records.

=== Doubles ===
Tournament	1998	1999	2000	2001	2002	2003	2004	2005	2006	2007	2008	2009	2010	2011	2012	2013	2014	2015	SR	W–L	Win%
Grand Slam tournaments
Australian Open	A	1R	1R	2R	1R	3R	1R	2R	QF	W	QF	QF	F	QF	A	3R	QF	1R	1 / 16	31–15	
French Open	A	1R	2R	3R	3R	SF	3R	F	QF	SF	SF	SF	3R	A	A	QF	QF	A	0 / 14	38–14	
Wimbledon	1R	2R	1R	2R	SF	3R	W	W	SF	W	SF	SF	3R	3R	A	2R	2R	QF	3 / 17	46–14	
US Open	1R	1R	F	SF	SF	SF	3R	QF	QF	2R	W	F	SF	A	A	3R	SF	A	1 / 15	46–14	
Win–loss	0–2	1–4	5–4	8–4	10–4	12–4	10–3	15–3	12–4	17–2	17–3	14–4	13–4	5–2	0–0	8–4	11–4	3–2	5 / 62	161–57	
National representation
Summer Olympics	not held		A	not held			A	not held			A	not held			A	not held			0 / 0	0–0	
Year-end championship
WTA Finals	A	A	QF	F	F	SF	F	F	F	W	W	F	A	A	A	A	W	A	3 / 11	15–8	
WTA 1000 + former^{†} tournaments
Dubai	not held			Tier II								W	SF	A	Premier				1 / 2	6–1	
Doha	not held			Tier III			Tier II				F	not held		P	A	2R	QF	A	0 / 3	5–3	
Indian Wells Open	1R	2R	1R	2R	2R	QF	2R	2R	2R	A	A	2R	QF	A	A	2R	F	A	0 / 13	16–13	
Miami Open	A	SF	2R	QF	2R	2R	1R	A	1R	F	F	2R	1R	A	A	1R	SF	A	0 / 13	19–13	
Berlin / Madrid Open (Note: In 2009, the Berlin Open was replaced by the Madrid Open. The Premier Mandatory tournaments were reclassified as WTA 1000 tournaments in 2021.)	A	2R	2R	F	SF	A	QF	F	2R	SF	W	W	1R	A	A	F	QF	A	2 / 13	28–11	
Italian Open	A	1R	2R	W	SF	2R	1R	W	SF	SF	QF	QF	2R	A	A	A	QF	A	2 / 13	18–11	
Canadian Open	A	1R	QF	SF	2R	2R	A	QF	F	F	W	SF	2R	A	A	A	F	A	1 / 12	19–11	
Cincinnati Open	not held						Tier III					W	QF	A	A	1R	2R	A	1 / 4	6–4	
Pan Pacific / Wuhan Open (Note: In 2014, the Toray Pan Pacific Open was downgraded to a Premier event and replaced by the Wuhan Open. The Premier 5 tournaments were reclassified as WTA 1000 tournaments in 2021.)	A	A	QF	1R	1R	QF	W	QF	F	A	A	SF	A	A	A	W	F	A	2 / 9	20–8	
China Open	not held						Tier II					QF	A	A	A	W	F	A	1 / 3	8–2	
Charleston Open^{†}	A	2R	A	A	A	QF	SF	A	A	SF	SF	Premier							0 / 5	7–5	
Southern California Open^{†}	Tier II						W	SF	W	W	not held		Premier						3 / 4	13–1	
Kremlin Cup^{†}	SF	A	A	1R	A	SF	A	F	1R	W	F	Premier							1 / 7	14–6	
Zurich Open^{†}	A	A	QF	A	A	SF	W	W	W	SF	T II	not held							3 / 6	19–3	
Career statistics
	1998	1999	2000	2001	2002	2003	2004	2005	2006	2007	2008	2009	2010	2011	2012	2013	2014	2015	SR	W–L	Win%
Tournaments	10	24	23	25	24	26	22	24	21	23	24	21	20	5	0	20	24	5	341		
Titles	0	0	1	7	2	2	7	6	2	9	10	5	3	0	0	3	3	0	60		
Finals	0	2	5	10	5	6	9	12	8	12	14	7	6	0	0	6	8	0	110		
Overall win–loss	8–10	25–24	32–21	52–18	46–19	48–24	45–15	59–18	43–19	69–14	66–14	49–16	41–16	8–5	0–0	38–17	49–21	5–5		683–276	
Year-end ranking	78	30	14	3	9	9	3	1	5	1	1	1	13	77	624	13	4	109			

=== Mixed doubles ===
Tournament	1998	1999	2000	2001	2002	2003	2004	2005	2006	2007	2008	2009	2010	2011	SR	W–L
Australian Open	A	A	2R	1R	1R	2R	2R	QF	1R	1R	QF	2R	W	2R	1 / 12	14–11
French Open	A	3R	3R	1R	1R	W	SF	F	2R	1R	2R	2R	QF	A	1 / 12	19–11
Wimbledon	3R	3R	2R	3R	2R	3R	W	2R	SF	QF	3R	F	W	QF	2 / 14	36–12
US Open	A	2R	2R	QF	QF	SF	2R	2R	1R	1R	W	F	QF	A	1 / 12	22–11
Win–loss	2–1	5–3	5–4	4–4	3–4	11–3	12–3	8–4	6–4	3–4	11–3	10–4	14–2	2–2	5 /	78–39

== Grand Slams tournament finals ==
=== Doubles: 9 (5 titles, 4 runner-ups) ===
Result	Year	Championship	Surface	Partner	Opponents	Score
Loss	2000	US Open	Hard	(Russia) Elena Likhovtseva	(France) Julie Halard-Decugis (Japan) Ai Sugiyama	0–6, 6–1, 1–6
Win	2004	Wimbledon	Grass	(Australia) Rennae Stubbs	(South Africa) Liezel Huber (Japan) Ai Sugiyama	6–3, 7–6^{(7–5)}
Loss	2005	French Open	Clay	(South Africa) Liezel Huber	(Spain) Virginia Ruano Pascual (Argentina) Paola Suárez	6–4, 3–6, 3–6
Win	2005	Wimbledon	Grass	(South Africa) Liezel Huber	(Russia) Svetlana Kuznetsova (France) Amélie Mauresmo	6–2, 6–1
Win	2007	Australian Open	Hard	(South Africa) Liezel Huber	(Chinese Taipei) Chan Yung-jan (Chinese Taipei) Chuang Chia-jung	6–4, 6–7^{(4–7)}, 6–1
Win	2007	Wimbledon	Grass	(South Africa) Liezel Huber	(Slovenia) Katarina Srebotnik (Japan) Ai Sugiyama	3–6, 6–3, 6–2
Win	2008	US Open	Hard	(United States) Liezel Huber	(United States) Lisa Raymond (Australia) Samantha Stosur	6–3, 7–6^{(10–8)}
Loss	2009	US Open	Hard	(United States) Liezel Huber	(United States) Serena Williams (United States) Venus Williams	2–6, 2–6
Loss	2010	Australian Open	Hard	(United States) Liezel Huber	(United States) Serena Williams (United States) Venus Williams	4–6, 3–6

=== Mixed doubles: 8 (5 titles, 3 runner-ups) ===
By winning the 2010 Australian Open title, Black completed the mixed doubles Career Grand Slam. She became the sixth female player in history to achieve this.

Result	Year	Championship	Surface	Partner	Opponents	Score
Win	2002	French Open	Clay	(Zimbabwe) Wayne Black	(Russia) Elena Bovina (The Bahamas) Mark Knowles	6–3, 6–3
Loss	2004	French Open	Clay	(Zimbabwe) Wayne Black	(France) Tatiana Golovin (France) Richard Gasquet	3–6, 4–6
Win	2004	Wimbledon	Grass	(Zimbabwe) Wayne Black	(Australia) Alicia Molik (Australia) Todd Woodbridge	3–6, 7–6^{(10–8)}, 6–4
Win	2008	US Open	Hard	(India) Leander Paes	(United States) Liezel Huber (United Kingdom) Jamie Murray	7–6^{(8–6)}, 6–4
Loss	2009	Wimbledon	Grass	(India) Leander Paes	(Germany) Anna-Lena Grönefeld (The Bahamas) Mark Knowles	5–7, 3–6
Loss	2009	US Open	Hard	(India) Leander Paes	(United States) Carly Gullickson (United States) Travis Parrot	2–6, 4–6
Win	2010	Australian Open	Hard	(India) Leander Paes	(Russia) Ekaterina Makarova (Czech Republic) Jaroslav Levinský	7–5, 6–3
Win	2010	Wimbledon	Grass	(India) Leander Paes	(United States) Lisa Raymond (South Africa) Wesley Moodie	6–4, 7–6^{(7–5)}

== Other significant finals ==
=== WTA Finals ===
==== Doubles: 9 (3 titles, 6 runner-ups) ====
Result	Year	Tournament	Surface	Partner	Opponents	Score
Loss	2001	WTA Tour Championships, Germany	Carpet (i)	(Russia) Elena Likhovtseva	(United States) Lisa Raymond (Australia) Rennae Stubbs	5–7, 6–3, 3–6
Loss	2002	WTA Tour Championships, United States	Hard (i)	(Russia) Elena Likhovtseva	(Russia) Elena Dementieva (Slovakia) Janette Husárová	6–4, 4–6, 3–6
Loss	2004	WTA Tour Championships, United States	Hard (i)	(Australia) Rennae Stubbs	(Russia) Nadia Petrova (United States) Meghann Shaughnessy	7–5, 6–2
Loss	2005	WTA Tour Championships, United States	Hard (I)	(Australia) Rennae Stubbs	(Australia) Samantha Stosur (United States) Lisa Raymond	6–7^{(5–7)}, 7–5, 6–4
Loss	2006	WTA Tour Championships, Spain	Hard (i)	(Australia) Rennae Stubbs	(United States) Lisa Raymond (Australia) Samantha Stosur	3–6, 6–3, 6–3
Win	2007	WTA Tour Championships, Spain	Hard (i)	(United States) Liezel Huber	(Slovenia) Katarina Srebotnik (Japan) Ai Sugiyama	5–7, 6–3, [10–8]
Win	2008	WTA Tour Championships, Qatar	Hard	(United States) Liezel Huber	(Czech Republic) Květa Peschke (Australia) Rennae Stubbs	6–1, 7–5
Loss	2009	WTA Tour Championships, Qatar	Hard	(United States) Liezel Huber	(Spain) Nuria Llagostera Vives (Spain) María José Martínez Sánchez	7–6^{(7–0)}, 5–7, [10–7]
Win	2014	WTA Finals, Singapore	Hard (i)	(India) Sania Mirza	(China) Peng Shuai (Chinese Taipei) Hsieh Su-Wei	6–1, 6–0

== WTA 1000 tournaments ==
=== Doubles: 31 (17 titles, 14 runner-ups) ===
Result	Year	Tournament	Surface	Partner	Opponents	Score
Loss	2001	German Open	Clay	(Russia) Elena Likhovtseva	(Belgium) Els Callens (United States) Meghann Shaughnessy	6–4, 6–3
Win	2001	Italian Open	Clay	(Russia) Elena Likhovtseva	(Argentina) Paola Suárez (Argentina) Patricia Tarabini	6–1, 6–1
Win	2004	Pan Pacific Open	Carpet	(Australia) Rennae Stubbs	(Russia) Elena Likhovtseva (Bulgaria) Magdalena Maleeva	6–0, 6–1
Win	2004	Southern California Open	Hard	(Australia) Rennae Stubbs	(Spain) Virginia Ruano Pascual (Argentina) Paola Suárez	4–6, 6–1, 6–4
Win	2004	Zurich Open	Hard (i)	(Australia) Rennae Stubbs	(Spain) Virginia Ruano Pascual (Argentina) Paola Suárez	6–4, 6–4
Loss	2005	German Open	Clay	(South Africa) Liezel Huber	(Russia) Vera Zvonareva (Russia) Elena Likhovtseva	4–6, 6–4, 6–3
Win	2005	Italian Open	Clay	(South Africa) Liezel Huber	(Russia) Maria Kirilenko (Spain) Anabel Medina Garrigues	6–0, 4–6, 6–1
Loss	2005	Kremlin Cup	Carpet	(Australia) Rennae Stubbs	(Australia) Samantha Stosur (United States) Lisa Raymond	6–2, 6–4
Win	2005	Zurich Open	Hard (i)	(Australia) Rennae Stubbs	(Slovakia) Daniela Hantuchová (Japan) Ai Sugiyama	6–7(6), 7–6(4), 6–3
Loss	2006	Pan Pacific Open	Carpet	(Australia) Rennae Stubbs	(Australia) Samantha Stosur (United States) Lisa Raymond	6–2, 6–1
Win	2006	Southern California Open	Hard	(Australia) Rennae Stubbs	(Germany) Anna-Lena Grönefeld (United States) Meghann Shaughnessy	6–2, 6–2
Loss	2006	Canadian Open	Hard	(Germany) Anna-Lena Grönefeld	(Russia) Nadia Petrova (United States) Martina Navratilova	6–1, 6–2
Win	2006	Zurich Open	Hard (i)	(Australia) Rennae Stubbs	(South Africa) Liezel Huber (Slovenia) Katarina Srebotnik	7–5, 7–5
Loss	2007	Miami Open	Hard	(South Africa) Liezel Huber	(United States) Lisa Raymond (Australia) Samantha Stosur	6–4, 3–6, [10–2]
Win	2007	Southern California Open	Hard	(United States) Liezel Huber	(Belarus) Victoria Azarenka (Russia) Anna Chakvetadze	7–5, 6–4
Loss	2007	Canadian Open	Hard	(United States) Liezel Huber	(Slovenia) Katarina Srebotnik (Japan) Ai Sugiyama	6–4, 2–6, [10–5]
Win	2007	Kremlin Cup	Carpet	(United States) Liezel Huber	(Belarus) Victoria Azarenka (Belarus) Tatiana Poutchek	4–6, 6–1, [10–7]
Loss	2008	Qatar Open	Hard	(United States) Liezel Huber	(Australia) Rennae Stubbs (Czech Republic) Květa Peschke	6–1, 5–7, [10–7]
Loss	2008	Miami Open	Hard	(United States) Liezel Huber	(Slovenia) Katarina Srebotnik (Japan) Ai Sugiyama	7–5, 4–6, [10–3]
Win	2008	German Open	Clay	(United States) Liezel Huber	(Spain) Nuria Llagostera Vives (Spain) María José Martínez Sánchez	3–6, 6–2, [10–2]
Win	2008	Canadian Open	Hard	(United States) Liezel Huber	(Russia) Maria Kirilenko (Italy) Flavia Pennetta	6–1, 6–1
Loss	2008	Kremlin Cup	Hard (i)	(United States) Liezel Huber	(Russia) Nadia Petrova (Slovenia) Katarina Srebotnik	6–4, 6–4
Win	2009	Dubai Championships	Hard	(United States) Liezel Huber	(Russia) Maria Kirilenko (Poland) Agnieszka Radwańska	6–3, 6–3
Win	2009	Madrid Open	Clay	(United States) Liezel Huber	(Czech Republic) Květa Peschke (United States) Lisa Raymond	4–6, 6–3, [10–6]
Win	2009	Cincinnati Open	Hard	(United States) Liezel Huber	(Spain) Nuria Llagostera Vives (Spain) María José Martínez Sánchez	6–3, 0–6, [10–2]
Loss	2013	Madrid Open	Clay	(New Zealand) Marina Erakovic	(Russia) Anastasia Pavlyuchenkova (Czech Republic) Lucie Šafářová	6–2, 6–4
Win	2013	Pan Pacific Open	Hard	(India) Sania Mirza	(Chinese Taipei) Chan Hao-ching (United States) Liezel Huber	4–6, 6–0, [11–9]
Win	2013	China Open	Hard	(India) Sania Mirza	(Russia) Vera Dushevina (Spain) Arantxa Parra Santonja	6–2, 6–2
Loss	2014	Indian Wells Open	Hard	(India) Sania Mirza	(China) Peng Shuai (Chinese Taipei) Hsieh Su-wei	6–7^{(5–7)}, 2–6
Loss	2014	Canadian Open	Hard	(India) Sania Mirza	(Italy) Sara Errani (Italy) Roberta Vinci	6–7^{(4–7)}, 3–6
Loss	2014	Wuhan Open	Hard	(France) Caroline Garcia	(Switzerland) Martina Hingis (Italy) Flavia Pennetta	4–6, 7–5, [10–12]

== WTA Tour finals ==
=== Singles: 2 (1 title, 1 runner-up) ===
Legend
WTA 250 (Tier IV / Tier IVb) ( (1–1)

Result	W–L	Date	Tournament	Tier	Surface	Opponent	Score
Loss	0–1	Jan 2000	Auckland, New Zealand	Tier IVb	Hard	(Luxembourg) Anne Kremer	6–4, 6–4
Win	1–1	Sep 2002	Waikoloa, United States	Tier IV	Hard	(United States) Lisa Raymond	7–6^{(7–1)}, 6–4

=== Doubles: 109 (60 titles, 49 runner-ups) ===
Legend
Grand Slam tournaments (5–4)
Finals (3–6)
WTA 1000 (Tier I / Premier 5 / Premier M) (17–15)
WTA 500 (Tier II / Premier) (23–16)
WTA 250 (12–8)

Result	W–L	Date	Tournament	Tier	Surface	Partner	Opponents	Score
Loss	0–1	Jun 1999	's-Hertogenbosch, Netherlands	Tier III	Grass	(Netherlands) Kristie Boogert	(Italy) Rita Grande (Italy) Silvia Farina Elia	7–5, 7–6^{(7–2)}
Loss	0–2	Nov 1999	Quebec City, Canada	Tier III	Hard (i)	(United States) Debbie Graham	(United States) Amy Frazier (United States) Katie Schlukebir	6–2, 6–3
Win	1–2	Jan 2000	Auckland, New Zealand	Tier IV	Hard	(France) Alexandra Fusai	(Austria) Barbara Schwartz (Austria) Patricia Wartusch	3–6, 6–3, 6–4
Loss	1–3	Jun 2000	Birmingham, United Kingdom	Tier III	Grass	(Kazakhstan) Irina Selyutina	(Australia) Lisa McShea (Australia) Rachel McQuillan	6–3, 7–6^{(7–5)}
Loss	1–4	Jul 2000	Stanford, United States	Tier II	Hard	(United States) Amy Frazier	(United States) Chanda Rubin (France) Sandrine Testud	6–4, 6–4
Loss	1–5	Sep 2000	New York, United States	Grand Slam	Hard	(Russia) Elena Likhovtseva	(Japan) Ai Sugiyama (France) Julie Halard-Decugis	6–0, 1–6, 6–1
Win	2–5	Jan 2001	Hobart, Australia	Tier V	Hard	(Russia) Elena Likhovtseva	(Romania) Ruxandra Dragomir (Spain) Virginia Ruano Pascual	6–4, 6–1
Win	3–5	Apr 2001	Hamburg, Germany	Tier II	Clay	(Russia) Elena Likhovtseva	(Czech Republic) Květa Hrdličková (Germany) Barbara Rittner	6–2, 4–6, 6–2
Loss	3–6	May 2001	Berlin, Germany	Tier I	Clay	(Russia) Elena Likhovtseva	(Belgium) Els Callens (United States) Meghann Shaughnessy	6–4, 6–3
Win	4–6	May 2001	Rome, Italy	Tier I	Clay	(Russia) Elena Likhovtseva	(Argentina) Paola Suárez (Argentina) Patricia Tarabini	6–1, 6–1
Win	5–6	Jun 2001	Birmingham, United Kingdom	Tier III	Grass	(Russia) Elena Likhovtseva	(United States) Kimberly Po (France) Nathalie Tauziat	6–1, 6–1
Loss	5–7	Jun 2001	Eastbourne, United Kingdom	Tier II	Grass	(Russia) Elena Likhovtseva	(United States) Lisa Raymond (Australia) Rennae Stubbs	6–2, 6–2
Win	6–7	Jul 2001	San Diego, United States	Tier II	Hard	(Russia) Elena Likhovtseva	(Switzerland) Martina Hingis (Russia) Anna Kournikova	6–4, 1–6, 6–4
Win	7–7	Aug 2001	New Haven, United States	Tier II	Hard	(Russia) Elena Likhovtseva	(Federal Republic of Yugoslavia) Jelena Dokić (Russia) Nadia Petrova	6–0, 3–6, 6–2
Win	8–7	Sep 2001	Tokyo, Japan	Tier II	Hard	(South Africa) Liezel Huber	(Belgium) Kim Clijsters (Japan) Ai Sugiyama	6–1, 6–3
Loss	8–8	Nov 2001	Munich, Germany	Finals	Carpet	(Russia) Elena Likhovtseva	(United States) Lisa Raymond (Australia) Rennae Stubbs	7–5, 3–6, 6–3
Loss	8–9	Mar 2002	Scottsdale, United States	Tier II	Hard	(Russia) Elena Likhovtseva	(United States) Lisa Raymond (Australia) Rennae Stubbs	6–3, 5–7, 7–6^{(7–4)}
Win	9–9	Apr 2002	Porto, Portugal	Tier IV	Clay	(Kazakhstan) Irina Selyutina	(Netherlands) Kristie Boogert (Spain) Magüi Serna	7–6^{(8–6)}, 6–4
Loss	9–10	Jun 2002	Eastbourne, United Kingdom	Tier II	Grass	(Russia) Elena Likhovtseva	(United States) Lisa Raymond (Australia) Rennae Stubbs	6–7^{(5–7)}, 7–6^{(8–6)}, 6–2
Win	10–10	Sep 2002	Bali, Indonesia	Tier III	Hard	(Spain) Virginia Ruano Pascual	(Russia) Svetlana Kuznetsova (Spain) Arantxa Sánchez Vicario	6–2, 6–3
Loss	10–11	Nov 2002	Los Angeles, United States	Finals	Hard (i)	(Russia) Elena Likhovtseva	(Russia) Elena Dementieva (Slovakia) Janette Husárová	4–6, 6–4, 6–3
Loss	10–12	Jan 2003	Auckland, New Zealand	Tier IV	Hard	(Russia) Elena Likhovtseva	(United States) Abigail Spears (United States) Teryn Ashley	6–2, 2–6, 6–0
Win	11–12	Jan 2003	Hobart, Australia	Tier V	Hard	(Russia) Elena Likhovtseva	(Austria) Barbara Schett (Austria) Patricia Wartusch	7–5, 7–6^{(7–1)}
Loss	11–13	Feb 2003	Dubai, United Arab Emirates	Tier II	Hard	(Russia) Elena Likhovtseva	(Russia) Svetlana Kuznetsova (United States) Martina Navratilova	6–3, 7–6^{(9–7)}
Win	12–13	Jul 2003	Stanford, United States	Tier II	Hard	(United States) Lisa Raymond	(South Korea) Yoon-Jeong Cho (Italy) Francesca Schiavone	7–6^{(7–5)}, 6–1
Loss	12–14	Oct 2003	Filderstadt, Germany	Tier II	Hard (i)	(United States) Martina Navratilova	(United States) Lisa Raymond (Australia) Rennae Stubbs	6–2, 6–4
Loss	12–15	Nov 2003	Philadelphia, United States	Tier II	Hard (i)	(Australia) Rennae Stubbs	(United States) Lisa Raymond (United States) Martina Navratilova	6–3, 6–4
Win	13–15	Jan 2004	Sydney, Australia	Tier II	Hard	(Australia) Rennae Stubbs	(Russia) Dinara Safina (United States) Meghann Shaughnessy	7–5, 3–6, 6–4
Win	14–15	Feb 2004	Tokyo, Japan	Tier I	Carpet	(Australia) Rennae Stubbs	(Russia) Elena Likhovtseva (Bulgaria) Magdalena Maleeva	6–0, 6–1
Win	15–15	Feb 2004	Antwerp, Belgium	Tier II	Carpet	(Belgium) Els Callens	(Switzerland) Myriam Casanova (Greece) Eleni Daniilidou	6–2, 6–1
Loss	15–16	May 2004	Vienna, Austria	Tier III	Clay	(Australia) Rennae Stubbs	(United States) Lisa Raymond (United States) Martina Navratilova	6–2, 7–5
Win	16–16	Jun 2004	London, United Kingdom	Grand Slam	Grass	(Australia) Rennae Stubbs	(South Africa) Liezel Huber (Japan) Ai Sugiyama	6–3, 7–6^{(7–5)}
Win	17–16	Jul 2004	San Diego, United States	Tier I	Hard	(Australia) Rennae Stubbs	(Spain) Virginia Ruano Pascual (Argentina) Paola Suárez	4–6, 6–1, 6–4
Win	18–16	Oct 2004	Filderstadt, Germany	Tier II	Hard (i)	(Australia) Rennae Stubbs	(Germany) Anna-Lena Grönefeld (Germany) Julia Schruff	6–3, 6–2
Win	19–16	Oct 2004	Zurich, Switzerland	Tier I	Hard (i)	(Australia) Rennae Stubbs	(Spain) Virginia Ruano Pascual (Argentina) Paola Suárez	6–4, 6–4
Loss	19–17	Nov 2004	Los Angeles, United States	Finals	Hard (i)	(Australia) Rennae Stubbs	(Russia) Nadia Petrova (United States) Meghann Shaughnessy	7–5, 6–2
Win	20–17	Feb 2005	Antwerp, Belgium	Tier II	Carpet	(Belgium) Els Callens	(Spain) Anabel Medina Garrigues (Russia) Dinara Safina	3–6, 6–4, 6–4
Loss	20–18	Feb 2005	Doha, Qatar	Tier II	Hard	(South Africa) Liezel Huber	(Italy) Francesca Schiavone (Australia) Alicia Molik	6–3, 6–4
Loss	20–19	May 2005	Berlin, Germany	Tier I	Clay	(South Africa) Liezel Huber	(Russia) Vera Zvonareva (Russia) Elena Likhovtseva	4–6, 6–4, 6–3
Win	21–19	May 2005	Rome, Italy	Tier I	Clay	(South Africa) Liezel Huber	(Russia) Maria Kirilenko (Spain) Anabel Medina Garrigues	6–0, 4–6, 6–1
Loss	21–20	Jun 2005	Paris, France	Grand Slam	Clay	(South Africa) Liezel Huber	(Spain) Virginia Ruano Pascual (Argentina) Paola Suárez	4–6, 6–3, 6–3
Win	22–20	Jun 2005	London, United Kingdom	Grand Slam	Grass	(South Africa) Liezel Huber	(Russia) Svetlana Kuznetsova (France) Amélie Mauresmo	6–2, 6–1
Win	23–20	Jul 2005	Stanford, United States	Tier II	Hard	(Australia) Rennae Stubbs	(Russia) Elena Likhovtseva (Russia) Vera Zvonareva	6–3, 7–5
Loss	23–21	Oct 2005	Luxembourg City, Luxembourg	Tier II	Hard (i)	(Australia) Rennae Stubbs	(Australia) Samantha Stosur (United States) Lisa Raymond	7–5, 6–1
Loss	23–22	Oct 2005	Moscow, Russia	Tier I	Carpet	(Australia) Rennae Stubbs	(Australia) Samantha Stosur (United States) Lisa Raymond	6–2, 6–4
Win	24–22	Oct 2005	Zurich, Switzerland	Tier I	Hard (i)	(Australia) Rennae Stubbs	(Slovakia) Daniela Hantuchová (Japan) Ai Sugiyama	6–7^{(6–8)}, 7–6^{(7–4)}, 6–3
Win	25–22	Oct 2005	Philadelphia, United States	Tier II	Hard (i)	(Australia) Rennae Stubbs	(United States) Lisa Raymond (Australia) Samantha Stosur	6–4, 7–6^{(7–4)}
Loss	25–23	Nov 2005	Los Angeles, United States	Finals	Hard (I)	(Australia) Rennae Stubbs	(Australia) Samantha Stosur (United States) Lisa Raymond	6–7^{(5–7)}, 7–5, 6–4
Loss	25–24	Jan 2006	Gold Coast, Australia	Tier III	Hard	(Australia) Rennae Stubbs	(Russia) Dinara Safina (United States) Meghann Shaughnessy	6–2, 6–3
Loss	25–25	Feb 2006	Tokyo, Japan	Tier I	Carpet	(Australia) Rennae Stubbs	(Australia) Samantha Stosur (United States) Lisa Raymond	6–2, 6–1
Loss	25–26	Feb 2006	Paris, France	Tier II	Carpet	(Australia) Rennae Stubbs	(France) Émilie Loit (Czech Republic) Květa Peschke	7–6^{(7–5)}, 6–4
Win	26–26	Jul 2006	San Diego, United States	Tier I	Hard	(Australia) Rennae Stubbs	(Germany) Anna-Lena Grönefeld (United States) Meghann Shaughnessy	6–2, 6–2
Loss	26–27	Aug 2006	Montreal, Canada	Tier I	Hard	(Germany) Anna-Lena Grönefeld	(Russia) Nadia Petrova (United States) Martina Navratilova	6–1, 6–2
Loss	26–28	Oct 2006	Stuttgart, Germany	Tier II	Hard (i)	(Australia) Rennae Stubbs	(United States) Lisa Raymond (Australia) Samantha Stosur	6–3, 6–4
Win	27–28	Oct 2006	Zurich, Switzerland	Tier I	Hard (i)	(Australia) Rennae Stubbs	(South Africa) Liezel Huber (Slovenia) Katarina Srebotnik	7–5, 7–5
Loss	27–29	Nov 2006	Madrid, Spain	Finals	Hard (i)	(Australia) Rennae Stubbs	(United States) Lisa Raymond (Australia) Samantha Stosur	3–6, 6–3, 6–3
Win	28–29	Jan 2007	Melbourne, Australia	Grand Slam	Hard	(South Africa) Liezel Huber	(Chinese Taipei) Yung-Jan Chan (Chinese Taipei) Chia-Jung Chuang	6–4, 6–7^{(4–7)}, 6–1
Win	29–29	Feb 2007	Paris, France	Tier II	Carpet	(South Africa) Liezel Huber	(Czech Republic) Gabriela Navrátilová (Czech Republic) Vladimíra Uhlířová	6–2, 6–0
Win	30–29	Feb 2007	Antwerp, Belgium	Tier II	Carpet	(South Africa) Liezel Huber	(Russia) Elena Likhovtseva (Russia) Elena Vesnina	7–5, 4–6, 6–1
Win	31–29	Feb 2007	Dubai, United Arab Emirates	Tier II	Hard	(South Africa) Liezel Huber	(Russia) Svetlana Kuznetsova (Australia) Alicia Molik	7–6^{(8–6)}, 6–4
Loss	31–30	Apr 2007	Miami, United States	Tier I	Hard	(South Africa) Liezel Huber	(United States) Lisa Raymond (Australia) Samantha Stosur	6–4, 3–6, [10–2]
Win	32–30	Jun 2007	London, United Kingdom	Grand Slam	Grass	(South Africa) Liezel Huber	(Slovenia) Katarina Srebotnik (Japan) Ai Sugiyama	3–6, 6–3, 6–2
Win	33–30	Jul 2007	San Diego, United States	Tier I	Hard	(United States) Liezel Huber	(Belarus) Victoria Azarenka (Russia) Anna Chakvetadze	7–5, 6–4
Loss	33–31	Aug 2007	Toronto, Canada	Tier I	Hard	(United States) Liezel Huber	(Slovenia) Katarina Srebotnik (Japan) Ai Sugiyama	6–4, 2–6, [10–5]
Loss	33–32	Aug 2007	New Haven, United States	Tier II	Hard	(United States) Liezel Huber	(India) Sania Mirza (Italy) Mara Santangelo	6–1, 6–2
Win	34–32	Oct 2007	Moscow, Russia	Tier I	Carpet	(United States) Liezel Huber	(Belarus) Victoria Azarenka (Belarus) Tatiana Poutchek	4–6, 6–1, [10–7]
Win	35–32	Oct 2007	Linz, Austria	Tier II	Hard (i)	(United States) Liezel Huber	(Slovenia) Katarina Srebotnik (Japan) Ai Sugiyama	6–2, 3–6, [10–8]
Win	36–32	Nov 2007	Madrid, Spain	Finals	Hard (i)	(United States) Liezel Huber	(Slovenia) Katarina Srebotnik (Japan) Ai Sugiyama	5–7, 6–3, [10–8]
Win	37–32	Feb 2008	Antwerp, Belgium	Tier II	Carpet	(United States) Liezel Huber	(Czech Republic) Květa Peschke (Japan) Ai Sugiyama	6–1, 6–3
Loss	37–33	Feb 2008	Doha, Qatar	Tier I	Hard	(United States) Liezel Huber	(Australia) Rennae Stubbs (Czech Republic) Květa Peschke	6–1, 5–7, [10–7]
Win	38–33	Mar 2008	Dubai, United Arab Emirates	Tier II	Hard	(United States) Liezel Huber	(China) Yan Zi (China) Zheng Jie	7–5, 6–2
Loss	38–34	Apr 2008	Miami, United States	Tier I	Hard	(United States) Liezel Huber	(Slovenia) Katarina Srebotnik (Japan) Ai Sugiyama	7–5, 4–6, [10–3]
Win	39–34	May 2008	Berlin, Germany	Tier I	Clay	(United States) Liezel Huber	(Spain) Nuria Llagostera Vives (Spain) María José Martínez Sánchez	3–6, 6–2, [10–2]
Win	40–34	Jun 2008	Birmingham, Great Britain	Tier III	Grass	(United States) Liezel Huber	(Spain) Virginia Ruano Pascual (France) Séverine Brémond	6–2, 6–1
Win	41–34	Jun 2008	Eastbourne, United Kingdom	Tier II	Grass	(United States) Liezel Huber	(Czech Republic) Květa Peschke (Australia) Rennae Stubbs	2–6, 6–0, [10–8]
Win	42–34	Jul 2008	Stanford, United States	Tier II	Hard	(United States) Liezel Huber	(Russia) Elena Vesnina (Russia) Vera Zvonareva	6–4, 6–3
Win	43–34	Aug 2008	Montreal, Canada	Tier I	Hard	(United States) Liezel Huber	(Russia) Maria Kirilenko (Italy) Flavia Pennetta	6–1, 6–1
Win	44–34	Sep 2008	New York, United States	Grand Slam	Hard	(United States) Liezel Huber	(Australia) Samantha Stosur (United States) Lisa Raymond	6–4, 7–6^{(8–6)}
Loss	44–35	Oct 2008	Moscow, Russia	Tier I	Hard (i)	(United States) Liezel Huber	(Russia) Nadia Petrova (Slovenia) Katarina Srebotnik	6–4, 6–4
Win	45–35	Oct 2008	Zurich, Switzerland	Tier II	Hard (i)	(United States) Liezel Huber	(Germany) Anna-Lena Grönefeld (Switzerland) Patty Schnyder	6–1, 7–6^{(7–3)}
Loss	45–36	Oct 2008	Linz, Austria	Tier II	Hard (i)	(United States) Liezel Huber	(Slovenia) Katarina Srebotnik (Japan) Ai Sugiyama	6–4, 7–5
Win	46–36	Nov 2008	Doha, Qatar	Finals	Hard	(United States) Liezel Huber	(Czech Republic) Květa Peschke (Australia) Rennae Stubbs	6–1, 7–5
Win	47–36	Feb 2009	Paris, France	Premier	Hard (i)	(United States) Liezel Huber	(Czech Republic) Květa Peschke (United States) Lisa Raymond	6–4, 3–6, [10–4]
Win	48–36	Feb 2009	Dubai, United Arab Emirates	Premier 5	Hard	(United States) Liezel Huber	(Russia) Maria Kirilenko (Poland) Agnieszka Radwańska	6–3, 6–3
Win	49–36	May 2009	Madrid, Spain	Premier M	Clay	(United States) Liezel Huber	(Czech Republic) Květa Peschke (United States) Lisa Raymond	4–6, 6–3, [10–6]
Win	50–36	Jun 2009	Birmingham, United Kingdom	International	Grass	(United States) Liezel Huber	(United States) Raquel Kops-Jones (United States) Abigail Spears	6–1, 6–4
Win	51–36	Aug 2009	Cincinnati, United States	Premier 5	Hard	(United States) Liezel Huber	(Spain) Nuria Llagostera Vives (Spain) María José Martínez Sánchez	6–3, 0–6, [10–2]
Loss	51–37	Sep 2009	New York, United States	Grand Slam	Hard	(United States) Liezel Huber	(United States) Serena Williams (United States) Venus Williams	6–2, 6–2
Loss	51–38	Nov 2009	Doha, Qatar	Finals	Hard	(United States) Liezel Huber	(Spain) Nuria Llagostera Vives (Spain) María José Martínez Sánchez	7–6^{(7–0)}, 5–7, [10–7]
Win	52–38	Jan 2010	Auckland, New Zealand	International	Hard	(United States) Liezel Huber	(South Africa) Natalie Grandin (United States) Laura Granville	7–6^{(7–4)}, 6–2
Win	53–38	Jan 2010	Sydney, Australia	Premier	Hard	(United States) Liezel Huber	(Italy) Tathiana Garbin (Russia) Nadia Petrova	6–1, 3–6, [10–3]
Loss	53–39	Jan 2010	Melbourne, Australia	Grand Slam	Hard	(United States) Liezel Huber	(United States) Serena Williams (United States) Venus Williams	6–4, 6–3
Loss	53–40	Feb 2010	Paris, France	Premier	Hard (i)	(United States) Liezel Huber	(Czech Republic) Barbora Záhlavová-Strýcová (Czech Republic) Iveta Benešová	walkover
Loss	53–41	May 2010	Warsaw, Poland	Premier	Clay	(China) Yan Zi	(United States) Meghann Shaughnessy (Spain) Virginia Ruano Pascual	6–3, 6–4
Win	54–41	Jun 2010	Birmingham, United Kingdom	International	Grass	(United States) Lisa Raymond	(United States) Liezel Huber (United States) Bethanie Mattek-Sands	6–3, 3–2 ret.
Win	55–41	Jan 2013	Auckland, New Zealand	International	Hard	(Australia) Anastasia Rodionova	(Germany) Julia Görges (Kazakhstan) Yaroslava Shvedova	2–6, 6–2, [10–5]
Loss	55–42	May 2013	Madrid, Spain	Premier M	Clay	(New Zealand) Marina Erakovic	(Russia) Anastasia Pavlyuchenkova (Czech Republic) Lucie Šafářová	6–2, 6–4
Loss	55–43	May 2013	Strasbourg, France	International	Clay	(New Zealand) Marina Erakovic	(Japan) Kimiko Date-Krumm (South Africa) Chanelle Scheepers	6–4, 3–6, [14–12]
Loss	55–44	Jun 2013	Birmingham, United Kingdom	International	Grass	(New Zealand) Marina Erakovic	(Australia) Ashleigh Barty (Australia) Casey Dellacqua	7–5, 6–4
Win	56–44	Sep 2013	Toray Pan Pacific Open, Tokyo, Japan	Premier 5	Hard	(India) Sania Mirza	(Chinese Taipei) Chan Hao-ching (United States) Liezel Huber	4–6, 6–0, [11–9]
Win	57–44	Oct 2013	China Open, Beijing, China	Premier M	Hard	(India) Sania Mirza	(Russia) Vera Dushevina (Spain) Arantxa Parra Santonja	6–2, 6–2
Loss	57–45	Mar 2014	BNP Paribas Open, Indian Wells, USA	Premier M	Hard	(India) Sania Mirza	(Chinese Taipei) Hsieh Su-wei (China) Peng Shuai	6–7^{(5–7)}, 2–6
Loss	57–46	Apr 2014	Porsche Tennis Grand Prix, Stuttgart, Germany	Premier	Clay	(India) Sania Mirza	(Italy) Sara Errani (Italy) Roberta Vinci	2–6, 3–6
Win	58–46	May 2014	Portugal Open, Oeiras, Portugal	International	Clay	(India) Sania Mirza	(Czech Republic) Eva Hrdinová (Russia) Valeria Solovyeva	6–4, 6–3
Loss	58–47	Aug 2014	Rogers Cup, Montreal, Canada	Premier 5	Hard	(India) Sania Mirza	(Italy) Sara Errani (Italy) Roberta Vinci	6–7^{(4–7)}, 3–6
Win	59–47	Sep 2014	Toray Pan Pacific Open, Tokyo, Japan	Premier	Hard	(India) Sania Mirza	(Spain) Garbiñe Muguruza (Spain) Carla Suárez Navarro	6–2, 7–5
Loss	59–48	Sep 2014	Wuhan Open, Wuhan, China	Premier 5	Hard	(France) Caroline Garcia	(Switzerland) Martina Hingis (Italy) Flavia Pennetta	4–6, 7–5, [10–12]
Loss	59–49	Oct 2014	China Open, Beijing, China	Premier M	Hard	(India) Sania Mirza	(Czech Republic) Andrea Hlaváčková (China) Peng Shuai	4–6, 4–6
Win	60–49	Oct 2014	WTA Finals, Singapore, Singapore	Finals	Hard (i)	(India) Sania Mirza	(China) Peng Shuai (Chinese Taipei) Hsieh Su-Wei	6–1, 6–0

== ITF Circuit finals ==
=== Singles: (6 titles, 5 runner-ups) ===
Legend
75K tournaments
25K tournaments
10K tournaments

Result	W–L	Date	Tournament	Tier	Surface	Opponent	Score
Loss		Mar 1993	Harare, Zimbabwe	10K	Hard	(United States) Erica Adams	2–6, 3–6
Loss		Mar 1994	Nairobi, Kenya	10K	Hard	(Austria) Nicole Melch	6–7^{(4-7)}, 0–6
Win		Mar 1995	Gaborone, Botswana	10K	Hard	(Finland) Linda Jansson	6–4, 6–2
Win		Mar 1995	Harare, Zimbabwe	10K	Hard	(South Africa) Karen van der Merwe	6–1, 6–2
Loss		Mar 1996	Gaborone, Botswana	10K	Hard	(United States) Jeri Ingram	6–4, 4–6, 4–6
Loss		Mar 1996	Harare, Zimbabwe	10K	Hard	(Netherlands) Linda Sentis	3–6, 6–3, 2–6
Win		May 1996	Nitra, Slovakia	10K	Clay	(Slovakia) Zuzana Váleková	w/o
Win		Feb 1997	Mission, United States	25K	Hard	(United States) Keri Phebus	6–3, 6–3
Win		Mar 1997	Dinard, France	10K	Clay (i)	(France) Magalie Lamarre	4–6, 6–4, 6–2
Loss		Aug 1998	Bronx, United States	25K	Hard	(France) Sarah Pitkowski-Malcor	3–6, 5–7
Win		Oct 1999	Santa Clara, United States	75K	Hard	(Israel) Anna Smashnova	6–2, 6–1

=== Doubles: (11 titles, 3 runner-ups) ===
Legend
75K tournaments
25K tournaments
10K tournaments

Result	W–L	Date	Tournament	Tier	Surface	Partner	Opponents	Score
Win		Mar 1994	Nairobi, Kenya	10K	Hard	(South Africa) Nannie de Villiers	(United Kingdom) Sybille Seyfried (Spain) Magüi Serna	6-2, 6-2
Loss		Mar 1995	Gaborone, Botswana	10K	Hard	(Australia) Elissa Burton	(United Kingdom) Michele Mair (South Africa) Karen van der Merwe	1-6, 4-6
Loss		Mar 1995	Harare, Zimbabwe	10K	Hard	(Australia) Elissa Burton	(South Africa) Lucinda Gibbs (South Africa) Giselle Swart	4-6, 6-7^{(4-7)}
Win		Apr 1995	Nairobi, Kenya	10K	Hard	(Australia) Elissa Burton	(South Africa) Lucinda Gibbs (South Africa) Giselle Swart	6-3, 6-2
Win		Apr 1996	Gelos, France	10K	Clay	(India) Nirupama Vaidyanathan	(France) Amélie Mauresmo (France) Isabelle Taesch	7-6^{(7-4)}, 6-3
Win		Nov 1996	São Paulo, Brazil	10K	Clay	(Kazakhstan) Irina Selyutina	(Slovakia) Ľudmila Cervanová (Slovakia) Zuzana Váleková	4-6, 6-4, 6-3
Win		Nov 1996	São Paulo, Brazil	10K	Clay	(Kazakhstan) Irina Selyutina	(Brazil) Miriam D'Agostini (Brazil) Vanessa Menga	3-6, 6-3, 6-2
Win		Jan 1997	Delray Beach, United States	10K	Hard	(Kazakhstan) Irina Selyutina	(United States) Brie Rippner (United States) Paige Yaroshuk	6-3, 6-3
Win		Apr 1997	Athens, Greece	25K	Clay	(Kazakhstan) Irina Selyutina	(Hungary) Virág Csurgó (Bulgaria) Svetlana Krivencheva	6-3, 6-4
Win		Aug 1997	Kyiv, Ukraine	25K	Clay	(Kazakhstan) Irina Selyutina	(Russia) Natalia Egorova (Russia) Olga Ivanova	6-2, 6-4
Win		Sep 1997	Tucumán, Argentina	25K	Clay	(Kazakhstan) Irina Selyutina	(Brazil) Miriam D'Agostini (Brazil) Vanessa Menga	6-3, 6-1
Win		Sep 1998	Santa Clara County, United States	75K	Hard	(Kazakhstan) Irina Selyutina	(Canada) Maureen Drake (United States) Lindsay Lee-Waters	6-4, 5-7, 6-3
Win		Oct 2012	Traralgon, Australia	25K	Hard	(Australia) Arina Rodionova	(Australia) Ashleigh Barty (Australia) Sally Peers	2–6, 7–6^{(9-7)}, [10–8]
Loss		May 2011	Bendigo, Australia	25K	Hard	(Australia) Arina Rodionova	(Australia) Ashleigh Barty (Australia) Sally Peers	6–7^{(12-14)}, 6–7^{(5-7)}
