= 2005 Zurich Open – Singles =

Singles
- 2005 Zurich Open

Final
- Champion: (United States) Lindsay Davenport
- Runner-up: (Switzerland) Patty Schnyder
- Score: 7–6^{(7–5)}, 6–3

Details
- Draw: 28
- Seeds: 4

Events
Singles	Doubles
← 2004 ·	Zurich Open	· 2006 →

Lindsay Davenport defeated Patty Schnyder in the final, 7–6^{(7–5)}, 6–3 to win the singles tennis title at the 2005 Zurich Open.

Alicia Molik was the defending champion, but retired in the first round against Jelena Janković.

== Seeds ==
1. (United States) Lindsay Davenport (champion)
2. (France) Amélie Mauresmo (second round)
3. (France) ~~Mary Pierce~~ (withdrew due to a right quad strain)
4. (Russia) Elena Dementieva (quarterfinals)
5. (Russia) Nadia Petrova (second round)
6. (Switzerland) Patty Schnyder (final)
7. (Russia) Anastasia Myskina (semifinals)
8. (Australia) Alicia Molik (first round, retired due to recurrence of vestibular neuronitis)

== Draw ==
=== Key ===
- Q = Qualifier
- WC = Wild card
- LL = Lucky loser
- Alt = Alternate
- SE = Special exempt
- PR = Protected ranking
- ITF = ITF entry
- JE = Junior exempt
- w/o = Walkover
- r = Retired
- d = Defaulted
- SR = Special ranking

=== Finals ===
Semifinals
1	(United States) Lindsay Davenport	6	6
7	(Russia) Anastasia Myskina	0	4
6	(Switzerland) Patty Schnyder	6	6
(Serbia and Montenegro) Ana Ivanovic	2	1

Final
1	(United States) Lindsay Davenport	7^{7}	6
6	(Switzerland) Patty Schnyder	6^{5}	3

=== Top half ===
First round
(Slovakia) D Hantuchová	1	7	6
Q	(Japan) A Sugiyama	6	5	4
(Italy) F Schiavone	5	6	6
Q	(Italy) R Vinci	7	2	1
WC	(Spain) C Martínez	4	6^{5}
5	(Russia) N Petrova	6	7^{7}
(Russia) S Kuznetsova	4	6	6^{3}
(France) N Dechy	6	4	7^{7}
(Russia) E Likhovtseva	6	4	0^{r}
(Italy) S Farina Elia	2	6	2
(Russia) V Zvonareva	2	0^{r}
7	(Russia) A Myskina	6	3

Second round
1	(United States) L Davenport	3	7	6
(Slovakia) D Hantuchová	6	5	2
(Italy) F Schiavone	3	6	7^{7}
5	(Russia) N Petrova	6	2	6^{3}
4	(Russia) E Dementieva	5	6	6
(France) N Dechy	7	2	4
(Italy) S Farina Elia	1	4
7	(Russia) A Myskina	6	6

Quarterfinals
1	(United States) L Davenport	6	4	6
(Italy) F Schiavone	4	6	4
4	(Russia) E Dementieva	3	7^{7}	4
7	(Russia) A Myskina	6	6^{1}	6

Semifinals
1	(United States) L Davenport	6	6
7	(Russia) A Myskina	0	4

=== Bottom half ===
First round
6	(Switzerland) P Schnyder	6	6
WC	(Argentina) G Dulko	1	3
WC	(Bulgaria) M Maleeva	6	6
(Russia) A Chakvetadze	1	1
LL	(Italy) F Pennetta	1	6	6
Q	(Czech Republic) K Peschke	6	1	4
8	(Australia) A Molik	3	2^{r}
(Serbia and Montenegro) J Janković	6	4
(Serbia and Montenegro) A Ivanovic	6	5	7
(France) T Golovin	4	7	5
(Japan) S Asagoe	4	6^{7}
Q	(Slovenia) K Srebotnik	6	7^{9}

Second round
6	(Switzerland) P Schnyder	6	6
WC	(Bulgaria) M Maleeva	3	2
LL	(Italy) F Pennetta	5	6	6
LL	(Bulgaria) S Karatantcheva	7	1	3
(Serbia and Montenegro) J Janković	2	1
(Serbia and Montenegro) A Ivanovic	6	6
Q	(Slovenia) K Srebotnik	6	6
2	(France) A Mauresmo	2	0

Quarterfinals
6	(Switzerland) P Schnyder	2	6	6
LL	(Italy) F Pennetta	6	4	2
(Serbia and Montenegro) A Ivanovic	6	6
Q	(Slovenia) K Srebotnik	3	1

Semifinals
6	(Switzerland) P Schnyder	6	6
(Serbia and Montenegro) A Ivanovic	2	1
