= 2002 Porto Open =

Tennis tournament

- Date: 1–7 April
- Edition: 2nd
- Category: Tier IV
- Draw: 32S / 16D
- Prize money: $140,000
- Surface: Clay / outdoor
- Location: Porto, Portugal

Champions

Singles
- (Spain) Ángeles Montolio

Doubles
- (Zimbabwe) Cara Black / (Kazakhstan) Irina Selyutina
- Porto Open

The 2002 Porto Open was a women's tennis tournament played on outdoor clay courts in Porto, Portugal and was part of Tier IV of the 2002 WTA Tour. It was the second and last edition of the tournament and was held from 1 April until 7 April 2002. First-seeded Ángeles Montolio won the singles title and earned $22,000 first-prize money.

== Finals ==
=== Singles ===
(Spain) Ángeles Montolio defeated (Spain) Magüi Serna 6–1, 2–6, 7–5

- It was Montolio's 1st singles title of the year and the third and last of her career.

=== Doubles ===
(Zimbabwe) Cara Black / (Kazakhstan) Irina Selyutina defeated (Netherlands) Kristie Boogert / (Spain) Magüi Serna 7–6^{(8–6)}, 6–4

- It was Black's 1st doubles title of the year and the 9th of her career. It was Selyutina's 2nd doubles title of the year and the 3rd and last of her career.
