= 2005 Zurich Open =

- Date: 17–23 October 2005
- Edition: 22nd
- Category: Tier I
- Draw: 28S / 16D
- Prize money: US$ 1,300,000
- Surface: Hard (indoor)
- Location: Zürich, Switzerland
- Venue: Hallenstadion

Champions

Singles
- (United States) Lindsay Davenport

Doubles
- (Zimbabwe) Cara Black / (Australia) Rennae Stubbs
| ← 2004 · | Zurich Open | · 2006 → |

The 2005 Zurich Open was a women's tennis tournament played on indoor hard courts. It was the 22nd edition of the event known as the Zurich Open, and was part of the Tier I Series of the 2002 WTA Tour. It took place at the Hallenstadion in Zürich, Switzerland, from 17 October through 23 October 2002. First-seeded Lindsay Davenport won the singles title, while Cara Black and Rennae Stubbs claimed the doubles title.

== Finals ==
=== Singles ===
(United States) Lindsay Davenport defeated (Switzerland) Patty Schnyder, 7–6^{(7–5)}, 6–3

=== Doubles ===
(Zimbabwe) Cara Black / (Australia) Rennae Stubbs defeated (Slovakia) Daniela Hantuchová / (Japan) Ai Sugiyama, 6–7^{(6–8)}, 7–6^{(7–4)}, 6–3
