= 2006 Zurich Open – Singles =

Singles
- 2006 Zurich Open

Final
- Champion: (Russia) Maria Sharapova
- Runner-up: (Slovakia) Daniela Hantuchová
- Score: 6–1, 4–6, 6–3

Details
- Draw: 28 (3WC/4Q/1LL)
- Seeds: 8

Events
Singles	Doubles
← 2005 ·	Zurich Open	· 2007 →

Maria Sharapova defeated Daniela Hantuchová in the final, 6–1, 4–6, 6–3 to win the singles tennis title at the 2006 Zurich Open.

Lindsay Davenport was the reigning champion, but did not participate this year.

== Seeds ==
The first four seeds received a bye to the second round.

1. (France) Amélie Mauresmo (quarterfinals)
2. (Russia) Maria Sharapova (champion)
3. (Russia) Svetlana Kuznetsova (semifinals)
4. (Russia) Elena Dementieva (second round)
5. (Switzerland) Martina Hingis (quarterfinals)
6. (Switzerland) Patty Schnyder (first round)
7. (Czech Republic) Nicole Vaidišová (first round)
8. (Italy) Francesca Schiavone (second round)

== Draw ==
=== Key ===
- Q = Qualifier
- WC = Wild card
- LL = Lucky loser
- Alt = Alternate
- ITF = ITF entry
- PR = Protected ranking
- SR = Special ranking
- SE = Special exempt
- JE = Junior exempt
- JR = Junior Accelerator Programme entrant
- CO = College Accelerator Programme entrant
- NG = Next Gen Accelerator Program entrant
- w/o = Walkover
- r = Retired
- d = Defaulted

=== Finals ===
Semifinals
(Slovakia) Daniela Hantuchová	6	6
3	(Russia) Svetlana Kuznetsova	4	2
(Slovenia) Katarina Srebotnik	6^{3}	2
2	(Russia) Maria Sharapova	7	6

Finals
(Slovakia) Daniela Hantuchová	1	6	3
2	(Russia) Maria Sharapova	6	4	6

=== Top half ===
First round
(Australia) S Stosur	6	6
Q	(Italy) ME Camerin	1	3
(France) M Bartoli	3	6	1
(Japan) A Sugiyama	6	4	6
(Slovakia) D Hantuchová	6	7
6	(Switzerland) P Schnyder	2	5
(Serbia and Montenegro) J Janković	3	6	6
Q	(Bulgaria) T Pironkova	6	4	1
WC	(France) N Dechy	6	6
LL	(Slovakia) J Gajdošová	3	4
Q	(Germany) AL Grönefeld	0	5
5	(Switzerland) M Hingis	6	7

Second round
1	(France) A Mauresmo	7	6
(Australia) S Stosur	6^{4}	3
(Japan) A Sugiyama	6^{7}	2
(Slovakia) D Hantuchová	7	6
3	(Russia) S Kuznetsova	7	7
(Serbia and Montenegro) J Janković	6^{6}	5
WC	(France) N Dechy	3	3
5	(Switzerland) M Hingis	6	6

Quarterfinals
1	(France) A Mauresmo
(Slovakia) D Hantuchová	w/o
3	(Russia) S Kuznetsova	6	1	6
5	(Switzerland) M Hingis	1	6	3

Semifinals
(Slovakia) D Hantuchová	6	6
3	(Russia) S Kuznetsova	4	2

=== Bottom half ===
First round
7	(Czech Republic) N Vaidišová	2	0
(France) T Golovin	6	6
WC	(Switzerland) E Gagliardi	4	6^{4}
(Russia) M Kirilenko	6	7
(Slovenia) K Srebotnik	6	7
(France) M Pierce	3	5
8	(Italy) F Schiavone	6	6
Q	(United States) M Tu	2	1
Q	(Switzerland) T Bacsinszky	6	6
(Russia) A Myskina	3	3
(Israel) S Pe'er	6	6
WC	(Australia) A Molik	1	2

Second round
(France) T Golovin	4^{r}
(Russia) M Kirilenko	2
(Slovenia) K Srebotnik	6	6
4	(Russia) E Dementieva	1	4
8	(Italy) F Schiavone	1	^{r}
Q	(Switzerland) T Bacsinszky	6
(Israel) S Pe'er	4	6^{4}
2	(Russia) M Sharapova	6	7

Quarterfinals
(Russia) M Kirilenko	3	2
(Slovenia) K Srebotnik	6	6
Q	(Switzerland) T Bacsinszky	4	3
2	(Russia) M Sharapova	6	6

Semifinals
(Slovenia) K Srebotnik	6^{3}	2
2	(Russia) M Sharapova	7	6

== Qualifying ==
=== Qualifying seeds ===
1. (Italy) Mara Santangelo (second round, retired)
2. (Ukraine) Alona Bondarenko (second round)
3. (China) Zheng Jie (second round)
4. (Germany) Martina Müller (second round)
5. (Sweden) Sofia Arvidsson (first round)
6. (United States) Meghann Shaughnessy (first round, retired)
7. (Argentina) Gisela Dulko (second round)
8. (Italy) Maria Elena Camerin (qualified)

=== Qualifiers ===
1. (Switzerland) Timea Bacsinszky
2. (United States) Meilen Tu
3. (Bulgaria) Tsvetana Pironkova
4. (Italy) Maria Elena Camerin

=== Lucky loser ===
1. (Slovakia) Jarmila Gajdošová

=== Qualifying draw ===
==== First qualifier ====
First round
1	(Italy) Mara Santangelo	6	6
(Czech Republic) Sandra Kleinová	2	1
(Finland) Emma Laine	4	5
(Czech Republic) Zuzana Ondrášková	6	7
(United States) Lisa Raymond	7^{13}	6
(Germany) Adriana Barna	6^{11}	0
(Switzerland) Timea Bacsinszky	6^{6}	7	1
6	(United States) Meghann Shaughnessy	7^{8}	5	0^{r}

Second round
1	(Italy) Mara Santangelo	6	5	0^{r}
(Czech Republic) Zuzana Ondrášková	4	7	0
(United States) Lisa Raymond	3	5
(Switzerland) Timea Bacsinszky	6	7

Qualifying competition
(Czech Republic) Zuzana Ondrášková	7	2	1
(Switzerland) Timea Bacsinszky	5	6	6

==== Second qualifier ====
First round
2	(Ukraine) Alona Bondarenko	6	6
(Russia) Ekaterina Bychkova	3	2
(United States) Meilen Tu	4	6	6
(Czech Republic) Kateřina Böhmová	6	0	3
(Hungary) Kira Nagy	6	4	0
(Slovakia) Jarmila Gajdošová	4	6	6
WC	(Romania) Sorana Cîrstea	4	2
7	(Argentina) Gisela Dulko	6	6

Second round
2	(Ukraine) Alona Bondarenko	3	0
(United States) Meilen Tu	6	6
(Slovakia) Jarmila Gajdošová	6	3	6
7	(Argentina) Gisela Dulko	3	6	4

Qualifying competition
(United States) Meilen Tu	6^{6}	6	6
(Slovakia) Jarmila Gajdošová	7^{8}	2	2

==== Third qualifier ====
First round
3	(China) Zheng Jie	6	7^{8}
(Ukraine) Olga Savchuk	4	6^{6}
(Croatia) Karolina Šprem	6	3	2
(Poland) Joanna Sakowicz	4	6	6
(Ukraine) Kateryna Bondarenko	6	6
(Venezuela) María Vento-Kabchi	1	1
(Bulgaria) Tsvetana Pironkova	6	6
5	(Sweden) Sofia Arvidsson	4	3

Second round
3	(China) Zheng Jie	4	1
(Poland) Joanna Sakowicz	6	6
(Ukraine) Kateryna Bondarenko	2	3
(Bulgaria) Tsvetana Pironkova	6	6

Qualifying competition
(Poland) Joanna Sakowicz	1	2
(Bulgaria) Tsvetana Pironkova	6	6

==== Fourth qualifier ====
First round
4	(Germany) Martina Müller	6	6
WC	(Switzerland) Nicole Riner	4	4
(China) Yan Zi	6	1	6^{5}
(Germany) Kathrin Wörle	4	6	7^{7}
WC	(Austria) Tamira Paszek	6^{4}	6	7^{7}
(Poland) Agnieszka Radwańska	7^{7}	4	6^{5}
WC	(Switzerland) Stefanie Vögele	2	2
8	(Italy) Maria Elena Camerin	6	6

Second round
4	(Germany) Martina Müller	2	3
(Germany) Kathrin Wörle	6	6
WC	(Austria) Tamira Paszek	2	6^{4}
8	(Italy) Maria Elena Camerin	6	7^{7}

Qualifying competition
(Germany) Kathrin Wörle	3	4
8	(Italy) Maria Elena Camerin	6	6
