= 2003 Swisscom Challenge =

- Date: 13–19 October
- Edition: 20th
- Category: Tier I Series
- Draw: 28S / 16D
- Prize money: UUSD1,300,000
- Surface: Hard (indoor)
- Location: Zürich, Switzerland
- Venue: Schluefweg

Champions

Singles
- (Belgium) Justine Henin-Hardenne

Doubles
- (Belgium) Kim Clijsters / (Japan) Ai Sugiyama
- Zurich Open

The 2003 Swisscom Challenge, also known as the Zurich Open, was a women's tennis tournament played on indoor hard courts that was part of the Tier I Series of the 2003 WTA Tour. It was the 20th edition of the tournament and took place at the Schluefweg in Zürich, Switzerland, from 13 to 19 October 2003. Second-seeded Justine Henin-Hardenne won the singles title and the $189,000 first-prize money. With this victory Henin-Hardenne became the new world No. 1 ranked singles player.

== Finals ==
=== Singles ===
(Belgium) Justine Henin-Hardenne defeated (Federal Republic of Yugoslavia) Jelena Dokić, 6–0, 6–4

- It was Henin-Hardenne's 8th singles title of the year and the 14th of her career.

=== Doubles ===
(Belgium) Kim Clijsters / (Japan) Ai Sugiyama defeated (Spain) Virginia Ruano Pascual / (Argentina) Paola Suárez 7–6^{(7–3)}, 6–2
