= 2006 Zurich Open =

- Date: 16–22 October
- Edition: 23rd
- Category: Tier I
- Draw: 28S (32Q) / 16D
- Prize money: $1,340,000
- Surface: Hard / indoor
- Location: Zürich, Switzerland
- Venue: Hallenstadion

Champions

Singles
- (Russia) Maria Sharapova

Doubles
- (Zimbabwe) Cara Black / (Australia) Rennae Stubbs
← 2005 ·	Zurich Open	· 2007 →

The 2006 Zurich Open was a women's tennis tournament played on indoor hard courts. It was a Tier I women's tennis event on the 2006 WTA Tour. Maria Sharapova won the singles title, while Cara Black and Rennae Stubbs won the doubles title.

== Finals ==
=== Singles ===
(Russia) Maria Sharapova defeated (Slovakia) Daniela Hantuchová, 6–1, 4–6, 6–3

=== Doubles ===
(Zimbabwe) Cara Black / (Australia) Rennae Stubbs defeated (South Africa) Liezel Huber / (Slovenia) Katarina Srebotnik, 7–5, 7–5
