= Mareze Joubert =

South African tennis player

- Country (sports): South Africa
- Born: 18 August 1973 (age 51)
- Prize money: $61,746

Singles
- Career record: 170–122
- Career titles: 3 ITF
- Highest ranking: No. 245 (8 May 1995)

Doubles
- Career record: 135–89
- Career titles: 15 ITF
- Highest ranking: No. 225 (24 April 1995)

Mareze Joubert (born 18 August 1973) is a South African former professional tennis player.

== Tennis career ==
Joubert began competing on the professional tour in the early 1990s. She reached a best singles ranking of 245 in the world and qualified for two WTA Tour main draws, at the Japan Open and Birmingham Classic in 1994. During her career, she won a total of 18 titles on the ITF Circuit, three in singles and 15 in doubles.

In 2001, she was called up to South Africa's Fed Cup team for a tie against Slovenia in Spain as a last minute replacement for Jessica Steck, who was unable to secure a visa. Playing club tennis in the Netherlands at the time, Joubert made the trip to Spain and featured in the doubles rubber, which she and Kim Grant won against Maja Matevžič and Tina Pisnik.

== ITF Circuit finals ==
=== Singles: 12 (3 titles, 9 runner-ups) ===
$25,000 tournaments
$10,000 tournaments

Result	No.	Date	Tournament	Surface	Opponent	Score
Loss	1.	27 September 1993	ITF Johannesburg, South Africa	Hard	(South Africa) Karen van der Merwe	4–6, 6–3, 0–6
Loss	2.	17 April 1995	ITF Plovdiv, Bulgaria	Clay	(Austria) Marion Maruska	0–6, 4–6
Loss	3.	16 June 1996	ITF Hilton Head, United States	Hard	(United States) Anne Mall	4–6, 5–7
Loss	4.	19 July 1997	ITF Frinton, United Kingdom	Grass	(South Africa) Surina De Beer	4–6, 4–6
Win	5.	27 September 1997	ITF Sunderland, United Kingdom	Carpet (i)	(Russia) Natalia Egorova	6–3, 1–6, 7–5
Win	6.	11 July 1998	ITF Felixstowe, United Kingdom	Grass	(United Kingdom) Lucie Ahl	7–5, 6–3
Win	7.	27 July 1998	ITF Ilkley, United Kingdom	Grass	(United Kingdom) Claire Lyte	6–3, 6–4
Loss	8.	18 September 1999	ITF Frinton, United Kingdom	Grass	(United Kingdom) Kate Warne Holland	6–1, 4–6, 1–6
Loss	9.	26 March 2000	ITF Wodonga, Australia	Grass	(Japan) Akiko Morigami	1–6, 1–6
Loss	10.	2 April 2000	ITF Corowa, Australia	Grass	(Australia) Melanie-Ann Clayton	7–5, 3–6, 1–6
Loss	11.	30 July 2000	ITF Dublin, Ireland	Carpet	(United Kingdom) Lucie Ahl	2–6, 4–6
Loss	12.	20 August 2000	ITF London, England	Hard	(Belgium) Patty Van Acker	4–6, 1–6

=== Doubles: 26 (15 titles, 11 runner-ups) ===
Result	No.	Date	Tournament	Surface	Partner	Opponents	Score
Loss	1.	12 June 1993	ITF Evansville, United States	Hard	(South Africa) Rene Mentz	(Netherlands) Carin Bakkum (Japan) Hiromi Nagano	2–6, 2–6
Loss	2.	26 June 1993	ITF Roanoke, United States	Hard	(Canada) Vanessa Webb	(Japan) Ai Sugiyama (Japan) Yoshiko Sasano	4–6, 3–6
Win	3.	17 January 1994	ITF Mcallen, United States	Hard	(United States) Jean Ceniza	(United States) Tonya Evans (United States) Eleni Rossides	7–6^{(2)}, 6–2
Loss	4.	24 January 1994	ITF Austin, United States	Hard	(United States) Jean Ceniza	(France) Sophie Amiach (Australia) Tracey Morton-Rodgers	6–7, 6–7
Win	5.	24 July 1994	ITF Salisbury, United States	Hard	(Greece) Christína Papadáki	(South Africa) Liezel Horn (Japan) Hiroko Mochizuki	3–6, 6–1, 6–4
Loss	6.	4 December 1995	ITF Port Pirie, Australia	Hard	(Australia) Joanne Limmer	(Australia) Jenny Byrne (Australia) Catherine Barclay	1–6, 3–6
Win	7.	16 June 1996	ITF Hilton Head, United States	Hard	(Indonesia) Liza Andriyani	(United States) Dawn Buth (United States) Stephanie Nickitas	6–4, 6–4
Win	8.	22 September 1997	ITF Sunderland, United Kingdom	Hard (i)	(United Kingdom) Helen Crook	(United Kingdom) Victoria Davies (Israel) Limor Gabai	6–2, 6–4
Win	9.	1 December 1997	ITF Pretoria, South Africa	Hard	(South Africa) Helen Crook	(South Africa) Lucinda Gibbs (South Africa) Giselle Swart	6–2, 7–5
Win	10.	25 April 1998	ITF Bournemouth, United Kingdom	Clay	(United Kingdom) Lizzie Jelfs	(Israel) Limor Gabai (United Kingdom) Kate Warne-Holland	6–3, 6–3
Win	11.	18 July 1998	ITF Frinton, United Kingdom	Grass	(United Kingdom) Lizzie Jelfs	(United Kingdom) Lucie Ahl (United Kingdom) Amanda Wainwright	6–2, 7–5
Win	12.	27 July 1998	ITF Ilkley, United Kingdom	Grass	(United Kingdom) Lizzie Jelfs	(United Kingdom) Helen Crook (United Kingdom) Victoria Davies	6–3, 6–4
Win	13.	3 August 1998	ITF Southsea, United Kingdom	Grass	(United Kingdom) Lizzie Jelfs	(Greece) Eleni Daniilidou (United Kingdom) Lucy Wood	6–2, 6–3
Win	14.	21 September 1998	ITF Sunderland, United Kingdom	Hard (i)	(United Kingdom) Lizzie Jelfs	(United Kingdom) Helen Crook (United Kingdom) Victoria Davies	6–1, 6–1
Loss	15.	1 March 1998	ITF Warrnambool, Australia	Grass	(United Kingdom) Kate Warne Holland	(Australia) Kerry-Anne Guse (Australia) Trudi Musgrave	4–6, 4–6
Loss	16.	15 March 1998	ITF Albury, Australia	Grass	(United Kingdom) Kate Warne Holland	(Australia) Kerry-Anne Guse (Australia) Trudi Musgrave	6–7, 3–6
Loss	17.	22 March 1998	ITF Corowa, Australia	Grass	(United Kingdom) Kate Warne Holland	(Australia) Kerry-Anne Guse (Australia) Trudi Musgrave	2–6, 6–1, 3–6
Win	18.	25 April 1999	ITF Hatfield, United Kingdom	Hard	(France) Stéphanie Testard	(United Kingdom) Kate Warne Holland (United Kingdom) Victoria Davies	6–1, 6–4
Loss	19.	30 August 1999	ITF Kuroshio, Japan	Hard	(United Kingdom) Kate Warne Holland	(Australia) Kerry-Anne Guse (Japan) Maiko Inoue	4–6, 6–7
Loss	20.	13 September 1999	ITF Ibaraki, Japan	Hard	(United Kingdom) Kate Warne Holland	(China) Li Ting (China) Li Na	6–7, 3–6
Win	21.	19 March 2000	ITF Benalla, Australia	Grass	(Australia) Kylie Hunt	(South Africa) Natalie Grandin (South Africa) Nicole Rencken	6–3, 6–2
Loss	22.	26 March 2000	ITF Wodonga, Australia	Grass	(Australia) Kylie Hunt	(South Africa) Natalie Grandin (South Africa) Nicole Rencken	6–4, 6–4
Win	23.	25 June 2000	ITF Alkmaar, Netherlands	Clay	(Australia) Nicole Sewell	(Argentina) Erica Krauth (Argentina) Vanessa Krauth	w/o
Loss	24.	23 July 2000	ITF Frinton, United Kingdom	Grass	(Australia) Nicole Sewell	(United Kingdom) Helen Crook (United Kingdom) Victoria Davies	2–6, 4–6
Win	25.	13 August 2000	ITF Bath, United Kingdom	Clay	(Australia) Nicole Sewell	(Australia) Jenny Belobrajdic (Japan) Ayami Takase	6–2, 6–2
Win	26.	8 July 2001	ITF Amsterdam, Netherlands	Clay	(Netherlands) Andrea van den Hurk	(Indonesia) Romana Tedjakusuma (Japan) Remi Tezuka	6–2, 6–3

== See also ==
- List of South Africa Fed Cup team representatives
