= 2003 Swisscom Challenge – Singles =

Singles
- 2003 Swisscom Challenge

Final
- Champion: (Belgium) Justine Henin-Hardenne
- Runner-up: (Federal Republic of Yugoslavia) Jelena Dokic
- Score: 6–0, 6–4

Details
- Draw: 28 (3WC/4Q/1LL)
- Seeds: 8

Events
Singles	Doubles
- Zurich Open

Justine Henin-Hardenne defeated Jelena Dokic in the final, 6–0, 6–4 to win the singles tennis title at the 2003 Swisscom Challenge. With the win, Henin-Hardenne replaced Kim Clijsters as the world No. 1.

Patty Schnyder was the defending champion, but lost in the quarterfinals to Dokic.

== Seeds ==
The first four seeds received a bye into the second round.

1. (Belgium) Kim Clijsters (semifinals)
2. (Belgium) Justine Henin-Hardenne (champion)
3. (France) Amélie Mauresmo (second round)
4. (Russia) Elena Dementieva (second round)
5. (United States) Chanda Rubin (first round)
6. (Japan) Ai Sugiyama (second round)
7. (Russia) Vera Zvonareva (quarterfinals)
8. (Slovakia) Daniela Hantuchová (first round)

== Draw ==
Key

- Q = Qualifier
- WC = Wild card
- LL = Lucky loser
- Alt = Alternate
- ITF = ITF entry
- PR = Protected ranking
- SR = Special ranking
- SE = Special exempt
- JE = Junior exempt
- JR = Junior Accelerator Programme entrant
- CO = College Accelerator Programme entrant
- NG = Next Gen Accelerator Program entrant
- w/o = Walkover
- r = Retired
- d = Defaulted

=== Finals ===
Semifinals
1	(Belgium) Kim Clijsters	6	3	4
(Federal Republic of Yugoslavia) Jelena Dokic	1	6	6
(Russia) Nadia Petrova	4	4
2	(Belgium) Justine Henin-Hardenne	6	6

Final
(Federal Republic of Yugoslavia) Jelena Dokic	0	4
2	(Belgium) Justine Henin-Hardenne	6	6

=== Top half ===
First round
Q	(Slovenia) K Srebotnik	6	2
WC	(France) M Pierce	0	0^{r}
Q	(Slovenia) T Pisnik	6	6
(South Africa) A Coetzer	3	0
LL	(Spain) M Serna	3	6	1
6	(Japan) A Sugiyama	6	3	6
(Greece) E Daniilidou	3	3
(Switzerland) P Schnyder	6	6
WC	(Switzerland) M Casanova	6	5	3
(United States) A Stevenson	3	7	6
(Federal Republic of Yugoslavia) J Dokic	6	5	6
5	(United States) C Rubin	1	7	4

Second round
1	(Belgium) K Clijsters	6	6
Q	(Slovenia) K Srebotnik	2	2
Q	(Slovenia) T Pisnik	5	6	6
6	(Japan) A Sugiyama	7	3	3
3	(France) A Mauresmo	2	2
(Switzerland) P Schnyder	6	6
(United States) A Stevenson	6	5	1
(Federal Republic of Yugoslavia) J Dokic	4	7	6

Quarterfinals
1	(Belgium) K Clijsters	6	6
Q	(Slovenia) T Pisnik	3	2
(Switzerland) P Schnyder	0	3
(Federal Republic of Yugoslavia) J Dokic	6	6

Semifinals
1	(Belgium) K Clijsters	6	3	4
(Federal Republic of Yugoslavia) J Dokic	1	6	6

=== Bottom half ===
First round
8	(Slovakia) D Hantuchová	6^{2}	5
(Argentina) P Suárez	7^{7}	7
(Russia) E Bovina	6	6
Q	(Australia) A Molik	4	1
(Russia) N Petrova	6	6
WC	(Switzerland) MG Mikaelian	3	1
7	(Russia) V Zvonareva	6	4	7^{7}
(United States) M Shaughnessy	0	6	6^{3}
(Spain) C Martínez	6	4	1
Q	(United States) A Frazier	4	6	6
(Italy) S Farina Elia	2	5
(Israel) A Pistolesi	6	7

Second round
(Argentina) P Suárez	4	3
(Russia) E Bovina	6	6
(Russia) N Petrova	7^{7}	6
4	(Russia) E Dementieva	6^{3}	3
7	(Russia) V Zvonareva	6	7
Q	(United States) A Frazier	3	5
(Israel) A Pistolesi	1	6^{5}
2	(Belgium) J Henin-Hardenne	6	7^{7}

Quarterfinals
(Russia) E Bovina	1	4
(Russia) N Petrova	6	6
7	(Russia) V Zvonareva	4	2
2	(Belgium) J Henin-Hardenne	6	6

Semifinals
(Russia) N Petrova	4	4
2	(Belgium) J Henin-Hardenne	6	6

== Qualifying ==
=== Qualifying seeds ===
1. (Italy) ~~Francesca Schiavone~~ (withdrew due to a shoulder injury)
2. (Spain) Magüi Serna (qualifying competition, Lucky loser)
3. (United States) ~~Lisa Raymond~~ (Still competing at Filderstadt)
4. (Russia) Svetlana Kuznetsova (qualifying competition)
5. (Russia) Elena Likhovtseva (qualifying competition)
6. (Slovenia) Katarina Srebotnik (qualified)
7. (Australia) Alicia Molik (qualified)
8. (Slovenia) Tina Pisnik (qualified)
9. (Colombia) Fabiola Zuluaga (first round)
10. (Czech Republic) Denisa Chládková (first round)

=== Qualifiers ===
1. (Slovenia) Katarina Srebotnik
2. (Slovenia) Tina Pisnik
3. (United States) Amy Frazier
4. (Australia) Alicia Molik

=== Lucky loser ===
1. (Spain) Magüi Serna

=== Qualifying draw ===
==== First qualifier ====
First round
9	(Colombia) Fabiola Zuluaga	6	3	4
(Ukraine) Tatiana Perebiynis	4	6	6
(Italy) Rita Grande	7^{8}	0	6
(Croatia) Silvija Talaja	6^{6}	6	4
Alt	(France) Caroline Dhenin	5	6	6
WC	(Switzerland) Tina Schmassmann	7	4	4
Alt	(Germany) Stephanie Gehrlein	7^{9}	3	1
6	(Slovenia) Katarina Srebotnik	6^{7}	6	6

Second round
(Ukraine) Tatiana Perebiynis	6^{5}	0
(Italy) Rita Grande	7^{7}	6
Alt	(France) Caroline Dhenin	0	3
6	(Slovenia) Katarina Srebotnik	6	6

Qualifying competition
(Italy) Rita Grande	3	6	1
6	(Slovenia) Katarina Srebotnik	6	1	6

==== Second qualifier ====
First round
2	(Spain) Magüi Serna	6	6
WC	(Germany) Anna-Lena Grönefeld	4	3
(Czech Republic) Sandra Kleinová	7	1	6
(Slovenia) Maja Matevžič	5	6	3
(Czech Republic) Klára Koukalová	w/o
(Zimbabwe) Cara Black
Alt	(Belgium) Els Callens	5	6^{6}
8	(Slovenia) Tina Pisnik	7	7^{8}

Second round
2	(Spain) Magüi Serna	6	7
(Czech Republic) Sandra Kleinová	0	5
(Czech Republic) Klára Koukalová	2	4
8	(Slovenia) Tina Pisnik	6	6

Qualifying competition
2	(Spain) Magüi Serna	6^{5}	5
8	(Slovenia) Tina Pisnik	7^{7}	7

==== Third qualifier ====
First round
10	(Czech Republic) Denisa Chládková	4	7^{7}	3
WC	(Switzerland) Timea Bacsinszky	6	6^{2}	6
(Germany) Marlene Weingärtner	5	3
(United States) Amy Frazier	7	6
(Germany) Anca Barna	6	6
Alt	(Czech Republic) Iveta Benešová	2	2
(Australia) Nicole Pratt	2	3
5	(Russia) Elena Likhovtseva	6	6

Second round
WC	(Switzerland) Timea Bacsinszky	4	1
(United States) Amy Frazier	6	6
(Germany) Anca Barna	2	2
5	(Russia) Elena Likhovtseva	6	6

Qualifying competition
(United States) Amy Frazier	6	6
5	(Russia) Elena Likhovtseva	3	2

==== Fourth qualifier ====
First round
4	(Russia) Svetlana Kuznetsova	2	6	6
(France) Stéphanie Cohen-Aloro	6	4	3
(Ukraine) Julia Vakulenko	6^{8}	6	6
Alt	(Canada) Sonya Jeyaseelan	7^{10}	3	4
(Slovakia) Ľudmila Cervanová	1	2
(United States) Laura Granville	6	6
(Croatia) Karolina Šprem	6^{3}	1
7	(Australia) Alicia Molik	7^{7}	6

Second round
4	(Russia) Svetlana Kuznetsova	6	3
(Ukraine) Julia Vakulenko	0	0^{r}
(United States) Laura Granville	4	1
7	(Australia) Alicia Molik	6	6

Qualifying competition
4	(Russia) Svetlana Kuznetsova	4	4
7	(Australia) Alicia Molik	6	6
