= 2004 Swisscom Challenge – Doubles =

Doubles
- 2004 Swisscom Challenge

Final
- Champions: (Zimbabwe) Cara Black (Australia) Rennae Stubbs
- Runners-up: (Spain) Virginia Ruano Pascual (Argentina) Paola Suárez
- Score: 6–4, 6–4

Details
- Draw: 16
- Seeds: 4

Events
Singles	Doubles
← 2003 ·	Zurich Open	· 2005 →

Kim Clijsters and Ai Sugiyama were the defending champions, but none competed this year. Clijsters was injured on her left wrist, while Sugiyama decided to focus on the singles tournament.

Cara Black and Rennae Stubbs won the title by defeating Virginia Ruano Pascual and Paola Suárez 6–4, 6–4 in the final.

== Seeds ==
1. (Spain) Virginia Ruano Pascual / (Argentina) Paola Suárez (final)
2. (Zimbabwe) Cara Black / (Australia) Rennae Stubbs (champions)
3. (Russia) Nadia Petrova / (United States) Meghann Shaughnessy (quarterfinals)
4. (Austria) Barbara Schett / (Switzerland) Patty Schnyder (first round)

== Draw ==
=== Key ===
- Q = Qualifier
- WC = Wild card
- LL = Lucky loser
- Alt = Alternate
- SE = Special exempt
- PR = Protected ranking
- ITF = ITF entry
- JE = Junior exempt
- w/o = Walkover
- r = Retired
- d = Defaulted
- SR = Special ranking

=== Draw ===
First round
1	(Spain) V Ruano Pascual (Argentina) P Suárez	6	7
(Slovenia) T Križan (Venezuela) M Vento-Kabchi	0	5
WC	(Russia) V Dushevina (Switzerland) MG Mikaelian	2	2
(Bosnia and Herzegovina) M Jugić-Salkić (Germany) M Weingärtner	6	6
3	(Russia) N Petrova (United States) M Shaughnessy	6	6
(Switzerland) E Gagliardi (Germany) AL Grönefeld	2	1
(Slovakia) J Husárová (Australia) A Molik	6	6
(Croatia) J Kostanić (United States) L McShea	1	0
Q	(France) N Dechy (France) T Golovin	6	6
(Spain) A Medina Garrigues (Spain) M Serna	4	3
(South Africa) L Huber (France) É Loit	5	6	6
4	(Austria) B Schett (Switzerland) P Schnyder	7	4	2
(France) M Pierce (United States) L Raymond	4	5
WC	(Slovakia) D Hantuchová (Bulgaria) M Maleeva	6	7
(Japan) S Asagoe (Slovenia) K Srebotnik	6^{9}	3
2	(Zimbabwe) C Black (Australia) R Stubbs	7^{11}	6

Quarterfinals
1	(Spain) V Ruano Pascual (Argentina) P Suárez	7	7
(Bosnia and Herzegovina) M Jugić-Salkić (Germany) M Weingärtner	5	5
3	(Russia) N Petrova (United States) M Shaughnessy	4	3
(Slovakia) J Husárová (Australia) A Molik	6	6
Q	(France) N Dechy (France) T Golovin	w/o
(South Africa) L Huber (France) É Loit
WC	(Slovakia) D Hantuchová (Bulgaria) M Maleeva	4	5
2	(Zimbabwe) C Black (Australia) R Stubbs	6	7

Semifinals
1	(Spain) V Ruano Pascual (Argentina) P Suárez	6	6
(Slovakia) J Husárová (Australia) A Molik	3	4
Q	(France) N Dechy (France) T Golovin	4	6	3
2	(Zimbabwe) C Black (Australia) R Stubbs	6	3	6

Final
1	(Spain) V Ruano Pascual (Argentina) P Suárez	4	4
2	(Zimbabwe) C Black (Australia) R Stubbs	6	6
