= Natalie Grandin =

South African tennis player

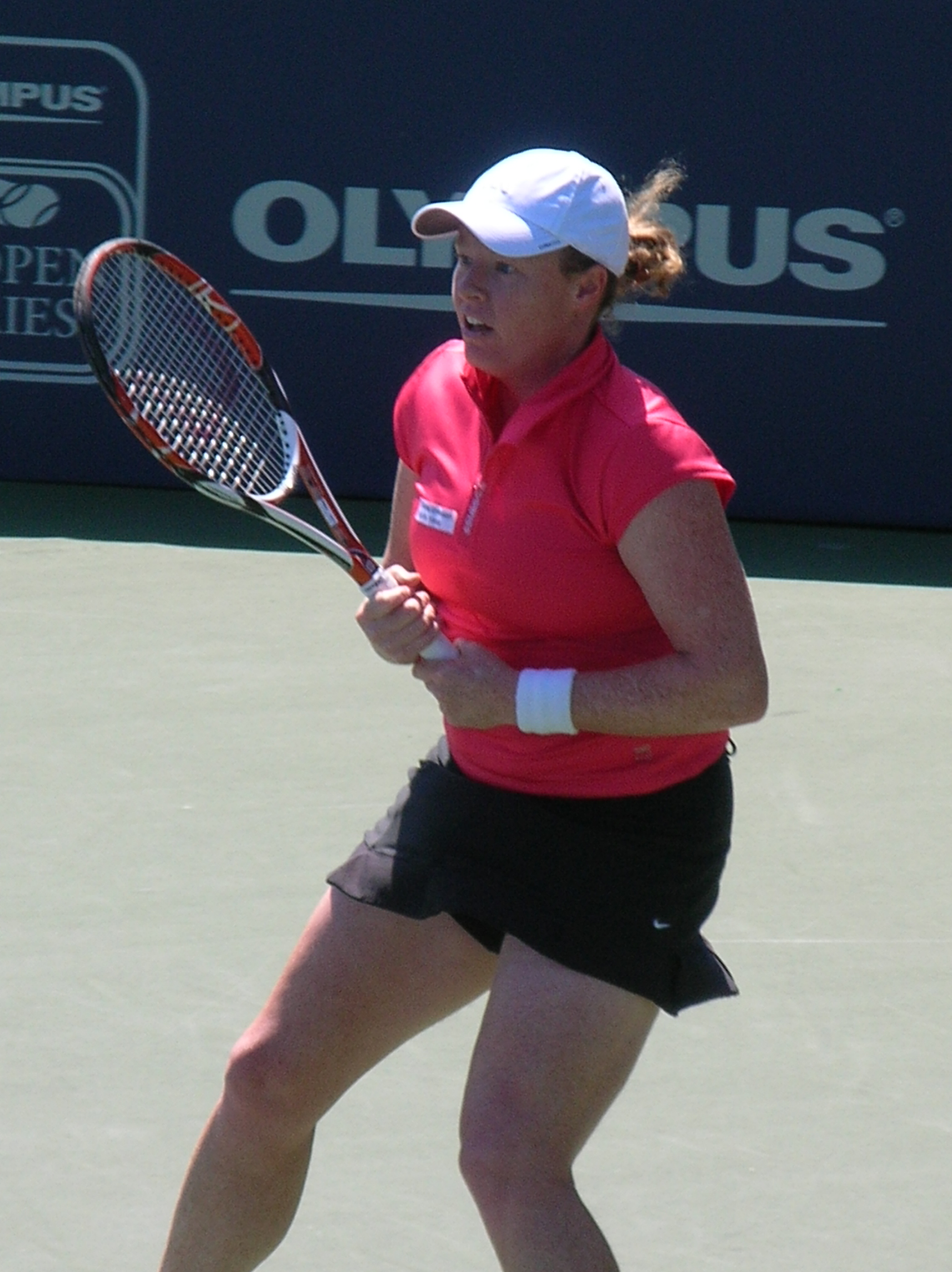
- Grandin at the 2010 Bank of the West Classic
- Country (sports): South Africa
- Residence: South Africa
- Born: 27 February 1981 (age 44) East London, South Africa
- Height: 1.75 m (5 ft 9 in)
- Turned pro: 1999
- Retired: 2015
- Plays: Left-handed (two-handed backhand)
- Prize money: $939,023

Singles
- Career record: 309–291
- Career titles: 3 ITF
- Highest ranking: No. 144 (12 September 2005)

Grand Slam singles results
- Australian Open: Q2 (2004, 2005, 2006)
- French Open: Q3 (2006)
- Wimbledon: Q2 (2003, 2004, 2007)
- US Open: Q3 (2005, 2007)

Doubles
- Career record: 408–349
- Career titles: 1 WTA, 25 ITF
- Highest ranking: No. 22 (14 May 2012)

Grand Slam doubles results
- Australian Open: QF (2011)
- French Open: 3R (2008, 2011)
- Wimbledon: 3R (2012)
- US Open: 3R (2012)

Natalie Grandin (born 27 February 1981) is a retired tennis player from South Africa. She achieved a career-high singles ranking of 144 as of 12 September 2005. On 14 May 2012, she peaked at No. 22 in the doubles rankings.

In her career, she won one WTA doubles title as well as three singles and 25 ITF doubles titles. She was known for her variety of play and volleying ability. Grandin retired from professional tennis in January 2015.

== Biography ==
She was coached by Petra de Jong. Her father, Roy, is a project manager in IT while her mother, Rosamund, is a freight forwarder. Natalie has two sisters. She is a baseliner whose favorite shot is the forehand and her favorite surface is hard court. Grandin started playing tennis at age four. She speaks English and Afrikaans.

== Significant finals ==
=== Premier Mandatory/Premier 5 finals ===
==== Doubles: 1 (runner-up) ====
| Result | Year | Tournament | Surface | Partner | Opponents | Score |
|---|---|---|---|---|---|---|
| Loss | 2011 | Cincinnati Open | Hard | (Czech Republic) Vladimíra Uhlířová | (United States) Vania King (Kazakhstan) Yaroslava Shvedova | 4–6, 6–3, [9–11] |

== WTA career finals ==
=== Doubles: 12 (1 title, 11 runner-ups) ===
| Legend Grand Slam tournaments (0–0) Tier I / Premier Mandatory & Premier 5 (0–1) Tier II / Premier (0–0) Tier III, IV & V / International (1–10) | Finals by surface Hard (1–7) Grass (0–0) Clay (0–4) Carpet (0–0) |

| Result | No. | Date | Tournament | Surface | Partner | Opponents | Score |
|---|---|---|---|---|---|---|---|
| Loss | 1. | Sep 2005 | Korea Open, Seoul | Hard | (United States) Jill Craybas | (Chinese Taipei) Chan Yung-jan (Chinese Taipei) Chuang Chia-jung | 2–6, 4–6 |
| Loss | 2. | Sep 2006 | Commonwealth Classic, Bali | Hard | (Australia) Trudi Musgrave | (United States) Lindsay Davenport (United States) Corina Morariu | 3–6, 4–6 |
| Loss | 3. | Oct 2006 | Bangkok Open, Thailand | Hard | (Argentina) Mariana Díaz Oliva | (United States) Vania King (Croatia) Jelena Kostanić | 5–7, 6–2, 5–7 |
| Loss | 4. | Sep 2007 | Commonwealth Classic, Bali | Hard | (United States) Jill Craybas | (China) Ji Chunmei (China) Sun Shengnan | 3–6, 2–6 |
| Loss | 5. | Jan 2010 | Auckland Open, New Zealand | Hard | (United States) Laura Granville | (Zimbabwe) Cara Black (United States) Liezel Huber | 6–7^{(4–7)}, 2–6 |
| Loss | 6. | Sep 2010 | Korea Open, Seoul | Hard | (Czech Republic) Vladimíra Uhlířová | (Germany) Julia Görges (Slovenia) Polona Hercog | 3–6, 4–6 |
| Loss | 7. | May 2011 | Internationaux de Strasbourg, France | Clay | (Czech Republic) Vladimíra Uhlířová | (Uzbekistan) Akgul Amanmuradova (Chinese Taipei) Chuang Chia-jung | 4–6, 7–5, [2–10] |
| Loss | 8. | Apr 2011 | Barcelona Open, Spain | Clay | (Czech Republic) Vladimíra Uhlířová | (Czech Republic) Iveta Benešová (Czech Republic) Barbora Záhlavová-Strýcová | 7–5, 4–6, [9–11] |
| Loss | 9. | Jul 2011 | Budapest Grand Prix, Hungary | Clay | (Czech Republic) Vladimíra Uhlířová | (Spain) Anabel Medina Garrigues (Poland) Alicja Rosolska | 2–6, 2–6 |
| Loss | 10. | Aug 2011 | Cincinnati Open, United States | Hard | (Czech Republic) Vladimíra Uhlířová | (United States) Vania King (Kazakhstan) Yaroslava Shvedova | 4–6, 6–3, [9–11] |
| Win | 1. | Sep 2011 | Korea Open, Seoul | Hard | (Czech Republic) Vladimíra Uhlířová | (Russia) Vera Dushevina (Kazakhstan) Galina Voskoboeva | 7–6^{(7–5)}, 6–4 |
| Loss | 11. | May 2012 | Internationaux de Strasbourg, France | Clay | (Czech Republic) Vladimíra Uhlířová | (Belarus) Olga Govortsova (Poland) Klaudia Jans-Ignacik | 7–6^{(7–4)}, 3–6, [3–10] |

== ITF Circuit finals ==
$100,000 tournaments
$75,000 tournaments
$50,000 tournaments
$25,000 tournaments
$10,000 tournaments

=== Singles: 7 (3–4) ===
| Result | No. | Date | Tournament | Surface | Opponent | Score |
|---|---|---|---|---|---|---|
| Loss | 1. | 7 February 1999 | ITF Wellington, New Zealand | Hard | (Hungary) Nóra Köves | 2–6, 2–6 |
| Win | 1. | 17 November 2002 | ITF Port Pirie, Australia | Hard | (Australia) Evie Dominikovic | 6–3, 6–2 |
| Loss | 2. | 12 October 2003 | ITF Lafayette, United States | Clay | (United States) Lindsay Lee-Waters | 2–6, 0–6 |
| Win | 2. | 31 July 2005 | ITF Lexington, United States | Hard | (Canada) Stéphanie Dubois | 6–4, 6–3 |
| Loss | 3. | 13 November 2006 | ITF Mount Gambier, Australia | Hard | (Australia) Casey Dellacqua | 1–6, 4–6 |
| Loss | 4. | 20 November 2006 | ITF Port Pirie, Australia | Hard | (Australia) Casey Dellacqua | 4–6, 2–6 |
| Win | 3. | 19 October 2008 | ITF Mount Gambier, Australia | Hard | (United Kingdom) Melanie South | 7–6^{(2)}, 6–4 |

=== Doubles: 46 (25–21) ===
| Result | No. | Date | Tournament | Surface | Partner | Opponents | Score |
|---|---|---|---|---|---|---|---|
| Loss | 1. | 22 December 1996 | ITF Cape Town, South Africa | Hard | (South Africa) Alicia Pillay | (Denmark) Charlotte Aagaard (Denmark) Maiken Pape | 7–5, 2–6, 3–6 |
| Loss | 2. | 7 March 1999 | ITF Wodonga, Australia | Grass | (South Africa) Alicia Pillay | (Australia) Kerry-Anne Guse (Australia) Trudi Musgrave | 3–6, 2–6 |
| Win | 1. | 18 July 1999 | ITF Frinton, Great Britain | Grass | (South Africa) Nicole Rencken | (New Zealand) Leanne Baker (Australia) Nicole Sewell | 6–2, 3–6, 6–1 |
| Loss | 3. | 12 March 2000 | ITF Warrnambool, Australia | Grass | (South Africa) Nicole Rencken | (Australia) Jenny Belobrajdic (Australia) Kristen van Elden | 3–6, 4–6 |
| Loss | 4. | 19 March 2000 | ITF Benalla, Australia | Grass | (South Africa) Nicole Rencken | (Australia) Kylie Hunt (South Africa) Mareze Joubert | 3–6, 2–6 |
| Win | 2. | 26 March 2000 | Wodonga, Australia | Grass | (South Africa) Nicole Rencken | (Australia) Kylie Hunt (South Africa) Mareze Joubert | 6–4, 6–4 |
| Loss | 5. | 2 April 2000 | Corona, Australia | Grass | (South Africa) Nicole Rencken | (Australia) Cindy Watson (Australia) Christina Wheeler | 3–6, 6–7^{(11–13)} |
| Win | 3. | 21 May 2000 | Edinburgh, Great Britain | Clay | (South Africa) Nicole Rencken | (Tunisia) Selima Sfar (United Kingdom) Lorna Woodroffe | 0–6, 6–3, 6–4 |
| Win | 4. | 28 May 2000 | Guimarães, Portugal | Hard | (South Africa) Nicole Rencken | (Portugal) Angela Cardoso (Portugal) Carlota Santos | 7–6^{(9–7)}, 2–6, 6–2 |
| Win | 5. | 11 June 2000 | Pretoria, South Africa | Hard | (South Africa) Nicole Rencken | (South Africa) Chanelle Scheepers (South Africa) Carien Venter | 7–6^{(7–4)}, 6–2 |
| Loss | 6. | 18 June 2000 | Benoni, South Africa | Hard | (South Africa) Nicole Rencken | (South Africa) Lucinda Gibbs (South Africa) Giselle Swart | 6–2, 4–6, 4–6 |
| Loss | 7. | 13 August 2000 | Hechingen, Germany | Clay | (South Africa) Nicole Rencken | (Brazil) Miriam D'Agostini (Germany) Angelika Rösch | 6–7^{(3–7)}, 2–6 |
| Win | 6. | 20 August 2000 | London, Great Britain | Hard | (South Africa) Nicole Rencken | (Germany) Susi Bensch (India) Manisha Malhotra | 6–2, 5–7, 7–6^{(8–6)} |
| Loss | 8. | 5 November 2000 | Gold Coast, Australia | Hard | (South Africa) Nicole Rencken | (United States) Amanda Augustus (Australia) Amy Jensen | 4–6, 3–6 |
| Loss | 9. | 15 July 2001 | Felixstowe, Great Britain | Grass | (South Africa) Kim Grant | (Australia) Trudi Musgrave (United Kingdom) Julie Pullin | 5–7, 4–6 |
| Win | 7. | 20 October 2002 | Mackay, Australia | Hard | (Australia) Nicole Sewell | (Australia) Sarah Stone (Australia) Samantha Stosur | 6–3, 1–6, 6–4 |
| Win | 8. | 27 April 2003 | Taranto, Italy | Clay | (South Africa) Kim Grant | (Austria) Nicole Remis (Romania) Delia Sescioreanu | 6–2, 6–1 |
| Loss | 10. | 26 October 2003 | Rockhampton, Australia | Hard | (Germany) Martina Müller | (Australia) Trudi Musgrave (United States) Abigail Spears | 1–6, 5–7 |
| Loss | 11. | 1 February 2004 | Waikoloa, United States | Hard | (United States) Amanda Augustus | (Argentina) Gisela Dulko (Argentina) Patricia Tarabini | 6–1, 3–6, 3–6 |
| Win | 9. | 1 August 2004 | Lexington, United States | Hard | (Republic of Ireland) Claire Curran | (Australia) Casey Dellacqua (Australia) Nicole Sewell | 7–6^{(8–6)}, 6–4 |
| Loss | 12. | 9 August 2004 | Louisville, United States | Hard | (Republic of Ireland) Claire Curran | (United States) Julie Ditty (Romania) Edina Gallovits-Hall | 6–1, 4–6, 2–6 |
| Loss | 13. | 11 October 2004 | Lafayette, United States | Clay | (United States) Arpi Kojian | (United States) Julie Ditty (United States) Kristen Schlukebir | 2–6, 5–7 |
| Win | 10. | 30 January 2005 | Waikoloa, United States | Hard | (United States) Kaysie Smashey | (Australia) Lauren Breadmore (Japan) Ayami Takase | 6–3, 6–4 |
| Win | 11. | 15 May 2005 | Saint-Gaudens, France | Clay | (United Kingdom) Claire Curran | (Argentina) María José Argeri (Brazil) Letícia Sobral | 6–3, 6–1 |
| Loss | 14. | 5 March 2006 | Clearwater, United States | Hard | (South Africa) Chanelle Scheepers | (Republic of Ireland) Kelly Liggan (Lithuania) Lina Stančiūtė | 3–6, 1–6 |
| Loss | 15. | 9 July 2006 | College Park, United States | Hard | (Chinese Taipei) Chan Chin-wei | (United States) Lindsey Nelson (United States) Anne Yelsey | 1–6, 3–6 |
| Win | 12. | 21 August 2006 | ITF The Bronx, United States | Hard | (United States) Julie Ditty | (Czech Republic) Lucie Hradecká (Czech Republic) Michaela Paštiková | 6–1, 7–6^{(7–2)} |
| Win | 13. | 13 November 2006 | ITF Mount Gambier, Australia | Hard | (Australia) Christina Wheeler | (Australia) Daniella Jeflea (Australia) Sophie Ferguson | 6–4, 4–6, 6–4 |
| Win | 14. | 20 November 2006 | ITF Port Pirie, Australia | Hard | (United States) Raquel Kops-Jones | (Australia) Christina Horiatopoulos (Australia) Nicole Kriz | 6–2, 6–1 |
| Win | 15. | 27 November 2006 | ITF Nuriootpa, Australia | Hard | (United States) Raquel Kops-Jones | (Australia) Trudi Musgrave (Australia) Christina Wheeler | 6–2, 7–6^{(7–3)} |
| Win | 16. | 28 January 2007 | ITF Waikoloa, United States | Hard | (United States) Raquel Kops-Jones | (Latvia) Līga Dekmeijere (United States) Julie Ditty | 6–0, 6–3 |
| Loss | 16. | 4 February 2007 | ITF Palm Desert, United States | Hard | (United States) Raquel Kops-Jones | (United States) Julie Ditty (Romania) Edina Gallovits-Hall | 2–6, 1–6 |
| Win | 17. | 17 July 2007 | ITF Boston, United States | Hard | (Hungary) Melinda Czink | (Latvia) Līga Dekmeijere (Turkey) İpek Şenoğlu | 6–1, 6–3 |
| Loss | 17. | 20 July 2007 | ITF Lexington, United States | Hard | (Australia) Casey Dellacqua | (Hungary) Melinda Czink (United States) Lindsay Lee-Waters | 2–6, 6–7^{(8–10)} |
| Loss | 18. | 5 August 2007 | ITF Washington, United States | Hard | (United States) Julie Ditty | (Argentina) Jorgelina Cravero (Argentina) Betina Jozami | 6–1, 1–6, 2–6 |
| Win | 18. | 18 November 2007 | ITF Nuriootpa, Australia | Hard | (United States) Robin Stephenson | (Australia) Sophie Ferguson (Australia) Trudi Musgrave | 6–4, 7–5 |
| Win | 19. | 6 July 2008 | ITF Boston, United States | Hard | (Chinese Taipei) Chan Chin-wei | (France) Yulia Fedossova (United States) Varvara Lepchenko | 6–4, 6–3 |
| Loss | 19. | 13 July 2008 | ITF Allentown, United States | Hard | (Chinese Taipei) Chan Chin-wei | (United States) Carly Gullickson (Australia) Nicole Kriz | 2–6, 3–6 |
| Win | 20. | 12 October 2008 | ITF Traralgon, Australia | Hard | (United States) Robin Stephenson | (Australia) Jarmila Gajdošová (Australia) Jessica Moore | 6–4, 6–2 |
| Win | 21. | 19 October 2008 | ITF Mount Gambier, Australia | Hard | (United States) Robin Stephenson | (Japan) Miki Miyamura (Japan) Erika Sema | 6–4, 6–2 |
| Win | 22. | 26 October 2008 | ITF Port Pirie, Australia | Hard | (United States) Robin Stephenson | (South Africa) Lizaan du Plessis (Australia) Tiffany Welford | 6–2, 6–0 |
| Loss | 20. | 23 November 2008 | ITF Phoenix, Mauritius | Hard | (South Africa) Kelly Anderson | (Serbia) Teodora Mirčić (Slovakia) Lenka Tvarošková | 4–6, 6–3, [4–10] |
| Win | 23. | 2 February 2009 | ITF Rancho Mirage, United States | Hard | (United States) Courtney Nagle | (Russia) Alina Jidkova (Belarus) Darya Kustova | 6–2, 7–6 |
| Win | 24. | 5 June 2009 | ITF Nottingham, United Kingdom | Grass | (United States) Alexa Glatch | (Greece) Eleni Daniilidou (Japan) Rika Fujiwara | 6–3, 2–6, [10–7] |
| Loss | 21. | 23 August 2010 | ITF The Bronx, United States | Hard | (United States) Abigail Spears | (Germany) Kristina Barrois (Austria) Yvonne Meusburger | 6–1, 4–6, [13–15] |
| Win | 25. | 14 March 2011 | ITF Nassau, Bahamas | Hard | (Czech Republic) Vladimíra Uhlířová | (United States) Raquel Kops-Jones (United States) Abigail Spears | 6–4, 6–2 |

== Grand Slam doubles performance timeline ==
Key
| W | F | SF | QF | #R | RR | Q# | DNQ | A | NH |

(W) winner; (F) finalist; (SF) semifinalist; (QF) quarterfinalist; (#R) rounds 4, 3, 2, 1; (RR) round-robin stage; (Q#) qualification round; (DNQ) did not qualify; (A) absent; (NH) not held; (SR) strike rate (events won / competed); (W–L) win–loss record.

| Tournament | 2001 | 2002 | 2003 | 2004 | 2005 | 2006 | 2007 | 2008 | 2009 | 2010 | 2011 | 2012 | 2013 | Career SR | Career W–L |
|---|---|---|---|---|---|---|---|---|---|---|---|---|---|---|---|
| Australian Open | A | 3R | 1R | A | 1R | A | 1R | A | 2R | 2R | QF | 2R | 3R | 0 / 9 | 10–9 |
| French Open | A | 1R | 1R | A | A | A | 2R | 3R | 1R | 1R | 3R | 2R | 1R | 1 / 9 | 6–9 |
| Wimbledon | 2R | 1R | 2R | 1R | 1R | 2R | 1R | 1R | 1R | 1R | 2R | 3R | 2R | 0 / 13 | 7–13 |
| US Open | A | 1R | 1R | A | A | A | 1R | 1R | 1R | 1R | 1R | 3R | 1R | 0 / 9 | 2–9 |
| Grand Slam SR | 0 / 1 | 0 / 4 | 0 / 4 | 0 / 1 | 0 / 2 | 0 / 1 | 0 / 4 | 0 / 3 | 0 / 4 | 0 / 4 | 0 / 4 | 0 / 4 | 0 / 4 | 0 / 40 | N/A |
| Win–loss | 1–1 | 2–4 | 1–4 | 0–1 | 0–2 | 1–1 | 1–4 | 2–3 | 1–4 | 1–4 | 6–4 | 6–4 | 3–4 | N/A | 25–40 |
