= 2004 Swisscom Challenge =

- Date: 17–24 October
- Edition: 21st
- Category: Tier I Series
- Draw: 28S / 16D
- Prize money: USD1,300,000
- Surface: Hard (indoor)
- Location: Zürich, Switzerland
- Venue: Schluefweg

Champions

Singles
- (Australia) Alicia Molik

Doubles
- (Zimbabwe) Cara Black / (Australia) Rennae Stubbs
- Zurich Open

The 2004 Swisscom Challenge, also known as the Zurich Open, was a women's tennis tournament played on indoor hard courts that was part of the Tier I Series of the 2004 WTA Tour. It was the 21st edition of the tournament and took place at the Schluefweg in Zürich, Switzerland, from 17 October until 24 October 2004. Unseeded Alicia Molik won the singles title and earned the $189,000 first-prize money.

== Finals ==
=== Singles ===
(Australia) Alicia Molik defeated (Russia) Maria Sharapova 4–6, 6–2, 6–3

- It was Molik's 2nd singles title of the year and the 3rd of her career.

=== Doubles ===
(Zimbabwe) Cara Black / (Australia) Rennae Stubbs defeated (Spain) Virginia Ruano Pascual / (Argentina) Paola Suárez 6–4, 6–4
