= Giselle Swart =

South African tennis player

- Country (sports): South Africa
- Born: 17 August 1977 (age 47); South Africa
- Turned pro: 1993
- Retired: 2001
- Plays: Right-handed
- Prize money: US$8,324

Singles
- Career record: 31–24
- Career titles: 1 ITF
- Highest ranking: No. 540 (15 January 2001)

Doubles
- Career record: 25–21
- Career titles: 3 ITF
- Highest ranking: No. 454 (8 January 2001)
Medal record
Women's tennis
Representing South Africa
African Games
Bronze medal – third place	1995 Harare	Women's Doubles

Giselle Swart (born 17 August 1977) is a retired South African tennis player.

Swart won one singles title and three doubles titles on the ITF Circuit during her career. On 15 January 2001, she reached her best singles ranking of world No. 540. On 8 January 2001, she peaked at No. 454 in the doubles rankings.

In 1995, she played for South Africa in the 1995 African Games in Harare, Zimbabwe where she won the bronze medal in women's doubles.

== ITF finals ==
=== Singles: 2 (1–1) ===
Outcome	No.	Date	Tournament	Surface	Opponent	Score
Winner	1.	7 December 1997	Pretoria, South Africa	Hard	(United States) Patty Murren	6–3, 4–6, 7–5
Runner-up	1.	6 December 1998	Benoni, South Africa	Hard	(Russia) Anna Nefedova	3–6, 3–6

=== Doubles: 6 (3–3) ===
Outcome	No.	Date	Tournament	Surface	Partner	Opponents	Score
Winner	1.	26 March 1995	Harare, Zimbabwe	Hard	(South Africa) Lucinda Gibbs	(Australia) Elissa Burton (Zimbabwe) Cara Black	6–4, 7–6^{(4)}
Runner-up	1.	2 April 1995	Nairobi, Kenya	Hard	(South Africa) Lucinda Gibbs	(Australia) Elissa Burton (Zimbabwe) Cara Black	3–6, 2–6
Runner-up	2.	6 December 1997	Pretoria, South Africa	Hard	(South Africa) Lucinda Gibbs	(United Kingdom) Helen Crook (South Africa) Mareze Joubert	2–6, 5–7
Winner	2.	22 November 1998	Benoni, South Africa	Hard	(South Africa) Lucinda Gibbs	(South Africa) Karin Coetzee (South Africa) Carien Venter	6–2, 6–3
Runner-up	3.	29 November 1998	Benoni, South Africa	Hard	(South Africa) Lucinda Gibbs	(South Africa) Delene Ackron (South Africa) Karen Bacon	7–5, 4–6, 5–7
Winner	3.	18 June 2000	Benoni, South Africa	Hard	(South Africa) Lucinda Gibbs	(South Africa) Natalie Grandin (South Africa) Nicole Rencken	2–6, 6–4, 6–4
