= 2003 Swisscom Challenge – Doubles =

Doubles
- 2003 Swisscom Challenge

Final
- Champions: (Belgium) Kim Clijsters (Japan) Ai Sugiyama
- Runners-up: (Spain) Virginia Ruano Pascual (Argentina) Paola Suárez
- Score: 7–6^{(7–3)}, 6–2

Details
- Draw: 16 (2WC/1Q/1Alt)
- Seeds: 4

Events
Singles	Doubles
← 2002 ·	Zurich Open	· 2004 →

Elena Bovina and Justine Henin-Hardenne were the defending champions but none competed this year, as both players decided to priorize the singles competition.

Kim Clijsters and Ai Sugiyama won the title by defeating Virginia Ruano Pascual and Paola Suárez 7–6^{(7–3)}, 6–2 in the final.

== Seeds ==
1. (Belgium) Kim Clijsters / (Japan) Ai Sugiyama (champions)
2. (Spain) Virginia Ruano Pascual / (Argentina) Paola Suárez (final)
3. (United States) Lisa Raymond / (Australia) Rennae Stubbs (quarterfinals)
4. (Zimbabwe) Cara Black / (South Africa) Liezel Huber (semifinals)

== Draw ==
=== Key ===
- Q = Qualifier
- WC = Wild card
- LL = Lucky loser
- Alt = Alternate
- SE = Special exempt
- PR = Protected ranking
- ITF = ITF entry
- JE = Junior exempt
- w/o = Walkover
- r = Retired
- d = Defaulted
- SR = Special ranking

=== Draw ===
First round
1	(Belgium) K Clijsters (Japan) A Sugiyama	3	6	6
(Russia) N Petrova (United States) M Shaughnessy	6	4	4
(Italy) R Grande (Slovenia) M Matevžič	6^{4}	6	2
(Russia) E Likhovtseva (Spain) C Martínez	7^{7}	2	6
3	(United States) L Raymond (Australia) R Stubbs	4	6	6
(Austria) B Schett (Switzerland) P Schnyder	6	3	4
WC	(Switzerland) T Bacsinszky (Ukraine) J Vakulenko	2	6	6^{3}
(Australia) A Molik (Spain) M Serna	6	2	7^{7}
Alt	(Ukraine) T Perebiynis (Croatia) S Talaja	6	6
(France) É Loit (Australia) N Pratt	3	4
(Russia) E Dementieva (Russia) V Zvonareva	4	6^{4}
4	(Zimbabwe) C Black (South Africa) L Huber	6	7^{7}
WC	(France) A Mauresmo (France) M Pierce
(Federal Republic of Yugoslavia) J Dokic (Slovenia) K Srebotnik	w/o
Q	(Canada) S Jeyaseelan (Thailand) T Tanasugarn	0	4
2	(Spain) V Ruano Pascual (Argentina) P Suárez	6	6

Quarterfinals
1	(Belgium) K Clijsters (Japan) A Sugiyama	4	6	6
(Russia) E Likhovtseva (Spain) C Martínez	6	3	1
3	(United States) L Raymond (Australia) R Stubbs	5	6^{3}
(Australia) A Molik (Spain) M Serna	7	7^{7}
Alt	(Ukraine) T Perebiynis (Croatia) S Talaja	6	2	1
4	(Zimbabwe) C Black (South Africa) L Huber	4	6	6
(Federal Republic of Yugoslavia) J Dokic (Slovenia) K Srebotnik	7^{10}	1	4
2	(Spain) V Ruano Pascual (Argentina) P Suárez	6^{8}	6	6

Semifinals
1	(Belgium) K Clijsters (Japan) A Sugiyama	6	6
(Australia) A Molik (Spain) M Serna	4	2
4	(Zimbabwe) C Black (South Africa) L Huber	6	3	6^{2}
2	(Spain) V Ruano Pascual (Argentina) P Suárez	1	6	7^{7}

Final
1	(Belgium) K Clijsters (Japan) A Sugiyama	7^{7}	6
2	(Spain) V Ruano Pascual (Argentina) P Suárez	6^{3}	2

== Qualifiers ==
=== Qualifying seeds ===
1. (France) Stéphanie Cohen-Aloro / (France) Caroline Dhenin (qualifying competition)
2. (Canada) Sonya Jeyaseelan / (Thailand) Tamarine Tanasugarn (qualified)

=== Qualifiers ===
1. (Canada) Sonya Jeyaseelan / (Thailand) Tamarine Tanasugarn

=== Qualifying draw ===
Qualifying competition
1	(France) Stéphanie Cohen-Aloro (France) Caroline Dhenin	4
2	(Canada) Sonya Jeyaseelan (Thailand) Tamarine Tanasugarn	8
