= 2006 Zurich Open – Doubles =

Doubles
- 2006 Zurich Open

Final
- Champions: (Zimbabwe) Cara Black (Australia) Rennae Stubbs
- Runners-up: (South Africa) Liezel Huber (Slovenia) Katarina Srebotnik
- Score: 7–5, 7–5

Events
| Singles | Doubles |
| ← 2005 · | Zurich Open | · 2007 → |

The doubles Tournament at the 2006 Zurich Open took place between 16 October and 23 October on the indoor hard courts of the Hallenstadion in Zürich, Switzerland. Cara Black and Rennae Stubbs won the title, defeating Liezel Huber and Katarina Srebotnik in the final.

== Seeds ==
1. (United States) Lisa Raymond / (Australia) Samantha Stosur (semifinals)
2. (China) Yan Zi / (China) Zheng Jie (second round)
3. (Zimbabwe) Cara Black / (Australia) Rennae Stubbs (champions)
4. (Spain) Virginia Ruano Pascual / (Argentina) Paola Suárez (first round)

== Draw ==
=== Key ===
- Q = Qualifier
- WC = Wild card
- LL = Lucky loser
- Alt = Alternate
- SE = Special exempt
- PR = Protected ranking
- ITF = ITF entry
- JE = Junior exempt
- w/o = Walkover
- r = Retired
- d = Defaulted
- SR = Special ranking

First round
1 | (United States) L Raymond (Australia) S Stosur | 6 | 6
(Italy) ME Camerin (Argentina) G Dulko | 2 | 0
(Serbia and Montenegro) J Janković (United States) C Morariu | 6 | 6
(United States) M Tu (Romania) A Vanc | 3 | 2
4 | (Spain) V Ruano Pascual (Argentina) P Suárez | 3 | 4
(South Africa) L Huber (Slovenia) K Srebotnik | 6 | 6
(France) M Bartoli (Israel) S Pe'er | 2 | 3
(Germany) AL Grönefeld (United States) M Shaughnessy | 6 | 6
Q | (Slovakia) J Gajdošová (Australia) B Stewart | 6^{11} | 3
(Czech Republic) K Peschke (Italy) F Schiavone | 7 | 6
(Greece) E Daniilidou (Germany) J Wöhr | 4 | 4
3 | (Zimbabwe) C Black (Australia) R Stubbs | 6 | 6
WC | (France) N Dechy (France) M Pierce | 4 | 3
(Slovakia) D Hantuchová (Japan) A Sugiyama | 6 | 6
(Russia) S Kuznetsova (Australia) A Molik | 4 | 6^{5}
2 | (China) Z Yan (China) J Zheng | 6 | 7

Quarterfinals
1 | (United States) L Raymond (Australia) S Stosur | 4 | 6 | 6
(Serbia and Montenegro) J Janković (United States) C Morariu | 6 | 2 | 2
(South Africa) L Huber (Slovenia) K Srebotnik | 6^{4} | 6 | 6
(Germany) AL Grönefeld (United States) M Shaughnessy | 7 | 2 | 2
(Czech Republic) K Peschke (Italy) F Schiavone
3 | (Zimbabwe) C Black (Australia) R Stubbs | w/o
(Slovakia) D Hantuchová (Japan) A Sugiyama | 6 | 6
2 | (China) Z Yan (China) J Zheng | 4 | 4

Semifinals
1 | (United States) L Raymond (Australia) S Stosur | 3 | 4
(South Africa) L Huber (Slovenia) K Srebotnik | 6 | 6
3 | (Zimbabwe) C Black (Australia) R Stubbs | 6 | 1 | 7
(Slovakia) D Hantuchová (Japan) A Sugiyama | 4 | 6 | 6^{3}

Final
(South Africa) L Huber (Slovenia) K Srebotnik | 5 | 5
3 | (Zimbabwe) C Black (Australia) R Stubbs | 7 | 7
