= 2004 Swisscom Challenge – Singles =

Singles
- 2004 Swisscom Challenge

Final
- Champion: (Australia) Alicia Molik
- Runner-up: (Russia) Maria Sharapova
- Score: 4–6, 6–2, 6–3

Details
- Draw: 28 (3WC/4Q/3LL)
- Seeds: 10

Events
| Singles | Doubles |
- Zurich Open

Alicia Molik defeated Maria Sharapova in the final, 4–6, 6–2, 6–3 to win the singles tennis title at the 2004 Swisscom Challenge.

Justine Henin-Hardenne was the reigning champion, but did not compete this year.

== Seeds ==
The top four seeds received a bye into the second round.

1. (France) ~~Amélie Mauresmo~~ (withdrew due to a left adductor strain)
2. (United States) ~~Lindsay Davenport~~ (withdrew due to a flu)
3. (Russia) Elena Dementieva (semifinals)
4. (Russia) Maria Sharapova (final)
5. (United States) ~~Serena Williams~~ (withdrew due to a left knee injury)
6. (Russia) Vera Zvonareva (second round)
7. (United States) Venus Williams (quarterfinals)
8. (Russia) Nadia Petrova (quarterfinals)
9. (Japan) Ai Sugiyama (quarterfinals)
10. (Switzerland) Patty Schnyder (semifinals)

== Draw ==
Key

- Q = Qualifier
- WC = Wild card
- LL = Lucky loser
- Alt = Alternate
- ITF = ITF entry
- PR = Protected ranking
- SR = Special ranking
- SE = Special exempt
- JE = Junior exempt
- JR = Junior Accelerator Programme entrant
- CO = College Accelerator Programme entrant
- NG = Next Gen Accelerator Program entrant
- w/o = Walkover
- r = Retired
- d = Defaulted

=== Finals ===
Semifinals
10 | (Switzerland) Patty Schnyder | 6 | 1 | 4
(Australia) Alicia Molik | 4 | 6 | 6
4 | (Russia) Maria Sharapova | 4 | 6 | 6
3 | (Russia) Elena Dementieva | 6 | 2 | 3

Final
(Australia) Alicia Molik | 4 | 6 | 6
4 | (Russia) Maria Sharapova | 6 | 2 | 3

=== Top half ===
First round
(Argentina) P Suárez | 6 | 3 | 6
LL | (Croatia) J Kostanić | 3 | 6 | 4
(France) M Pierce | 3 | 2
(Colombia) F Zuluaga | 6 | 6
(Bulgaria) M Maleeva | 6 | 1 | 4
10 | (Switzerland) P Schnyder | 1 | 6 | 6
(Australia) A Molik | 6 | 7^{7}
(Italy) S Farina Elia | 1 | 6^{5}
WC | (Switzerland) T Bacsinszky | 1 | 4
(France) N Dechy | 6 | 6
WC | (United States) L Raymond | 4 | 3
8 | (Russia) N Petrova | 6 | 6

Second round
LL | (France) É Loit | 1 | 2^{r}
(Argentina) P Suárez | 6 | 2
(Colombia) F Zuluaga | 4 | 3
10 | (Switzerland) P Schnyder | 6 | 6
6 | (Russia) V Zvonareva | 3 | 7 | 2
(Australia) A Molik | 6 | 5 | 6
(France) N Dechy | 7^{8} | 4 | 3
8 | (Russia) N Petrova | 6^{6} | 6 | 6

Quarterfinals
(Argentina) P Suárez | 6 | 3 | 4
10 | (Switzerland) P Schnyder | 2 | 6 | 6
(Australia) A Molik | 6 | 6
8 | (Russia) N Petrova | 3 | 1

Semifinals
10 | (Switzerland) P Schnyder | 6 | 1 | 4
(Australia) A Molik | 4 | 6 | 6

=== Bottom half ===
First round
7 | (United States) V Williams | 6 | 6
(Croatia) K Šprem | 2 | 2
Q | (Serbia and Montenegro) A Ivanovic | 7 | 6^{2} | 7^{7}
Q | (France) T Golovin | 5 | 7^{7} | 6^{3}
WC | (Russia) V Dushevina | 1 | 4
(Slovakia) D Hantuchová | 6 | 6
9 | (Japan) A Sugiyama | 6 | 6
Q | (Japan) S Asagoe | 2 | 3
LL | (Italy) F Pennetta | 6 | 6
Q | (Switzerland) MG Mikaelian | 2 | 1
(Russia) E Bovina | 6 | 7^{7}
(Italy) F Schiavone | 3 | 6^{5}

Second round
7 | (United States) V Williams | 7^{13} | 7^{8}
Q | (Serbia and Montenegro) A Ivanovic | 6^{11} | 6^{6}
(Slovakia) D Hantuchová | 4 | 5
4 | (Russia) M Sharapova | 6 | 7
9 | (Japan) A Sugiyama | 7^{7} | 6
LL | (Italy) F Pennetta | 6^{1} | 1
(Russia) E Bovina | 5 | 6 | 0
3 | (Russia) E Dementieva | 7 | 3 | 6

Quarterfinals
7 | (United States) V Williams | 3 | 4
4 | (Russia) M Sharapova | 6 | 6
9 | (Japan) A Sugiyama | 1 | 7 | 5
3 | (Russia) E Dementieva | 6 | 5 | 7

Semifinals
4 | (Russia) M Sharapova | 4 | 6 | 6
3 | (Russia) E Dementieva | 6 | 2 | 3

== Qualifying ==
=== Qualifying seeds ===
1. (France) Tatiana Golovin (qualified)
2. (Croatia) Jelena Kostanić (qualifying competition, lucky loser)
3. (Czech Republic) Iveta Benešová (second round)
4. (Italy) Flavia Pennetta (qualifying competition, lucky loser)
5. (France) Émilie Loit (qualifying competition, lucky loser)
6. (Italy) Maria Elena Camerin (first round)
7. (Japan) Shinobu Asagoe (qualified)
8. (Czech Republic) Klára Koukalová (second round)

=== Qualifiers ===
1. (France) Tatiana Golovin
2. (Serbia and Montenegro) Ana Ivanovic
3. (Japan) Shinobu Asagoe
4. (Switzerland) Marie-Gaïané Mikaelian

=== Lucky losers ===
1. (Croatia) Jelena Kostanić
2. (Italy) Flavia Pennetta
3. (France) Émilie Loit

=== Qualifying draw ===
==== First qualifier ====
First round
1 | (France) Tatiana Golovin | 6 | 4 | 6
(Russia) Tatiana Panova | 1 | 6 | 3
WC | (Germany) Martina Müller | 1 | 4
Alt | (Germany) Adriana Barna | 6 | 6
Alt | (Germany) Caroline Schneider | 1 | 3
(Luxembourg) Claudine Schaul | 6 | 6
(Czech Republic) Sandra Kleinová | 2 | 6 | 2
5 | (France) Émilie Loit | 6 | 3 | 6

Second round
1 | (France) Tatiana Golovin | 6 | 6
Alt | (Germany) Adriana Barna | 2 | 1
(Luxembourg) Claudine Schaul | 2 | 6 | 1
5 | (France) Émilie Loit | 6 | 1 | 6

Qualifying competition
1 | (France) Tatiana Golovin | 6 | 6
5 | (France) Émilie Loit | 0 | 3

==== Second qualifier ====
First round
2 | (Croatia) Jelena Kostanić | 6 | 6
(Spain) Magüi Serna | 1 | 2
(Bosnia and Herzegovina) Mervana Jugić-Salkić | 6 | 6
Alt | (Germany) Kathrin Wörle | 1 | 4
(Germany) Marlene Weingärtner | 2 | 0
(Serbia and Montenegro) Ana Ivanovic | 6 | 6
(Zimbabwe) Cara Black | 4 | 2
8 | (Czech Republic) Klára Koukalová | 6 | 6

Second round
2 | (Croatia) Jelena Kostanić | 7 | 7^{7}
(Bosnia and Herzegovina) Mervana Jugić-Salkić | 5 | 6^{4}
(Serbia and Montenegro) Ana Ivanovic | 6 | 7
8 | (Czech Republic) Klára Koukalová | 0 | 5

Qualifying competition
2 | (Croatia) Jelena Kostanić | 2 | 1
(Serbia and Montenegro) Ana Ivanovic | 6 | 6

==== Third qualifier ====
First round
3 | (Czech Republic) Iveta Benešová | 1 | 6 | 7^{7}
(Czech Republic) Michaela Paštiková | 6 | 3 | 6^{4}
(Czech Republic) Denisa Chládková | 6 | 6
WC | (Bulgaria) Desislava Topalova | 2 | 2
WC | (Slovakia) Janette Husárová | 4 | 6 | 6
(Hungary) Anikó Kapros | 6 | 0 | 2
(Slovenia) Tina Pisnik | 6 | 6^{1} | 3
7 | (Japan) Shinobu Asagoe | 2 | 7^{7} | 6

Second round
3 | (Czech Republic) Iveta Benešová | 6 | 2 | 3
(Czech Republic) Denisa Chládková | 4 | 6 | 6
WC | (Slovakia) Janette Husárová | 1 | 2
7 | (Japan) Shinobu Asagoe | 6 | 6

Qualifying competition
(Czech Republic) Denisa Chládková | 6^{4} | 3
7 | (Japan) Shinobu Asagoe | 7^{7} | 6

==== Fourth qualifier ====
First round
4 | (Italy) Flavia Pennetta | 7 | 6
(Slovenia) Katarina Srebotnik | 5 | 1
(Switzerland) Emmanuelle Gagliardi | 4 | 7^{7} | 4
(Austria) Yvonne Meusburger | 6 | 6^{5} | 6
(Venezuela) María Vento-Kabchi | 6 | 6
(Germany) Jana Kandarr | 0 | 3
(Switzerland) Marie-Gaïané Mikaelian | 7 | 6
6 | (Italy) Maria Elena Camerin | 5 | 1

Second round
4 | (Italy) Flavia Pennetta | 6 | 6
(Austria) Yvonne Meusburger | 4 | 2
(Venezuela) María Vento-Kabchi | 6^{4} | 4
(Switzerland) Marie-Gaïané Mikaelian | 7^{7} | 6

Qualifying competition
4 | (Italy) Flavia Pennetta | 6^{2} | 0
(Switzerland) Marie-Gaïané Mikaelian | 7^{7} | 6
