= 2005 Zurich Open – Doubles =

Doubles
- 2005 Zurich Open

Final
- Champions: (Zimbabwe) Cara Black (Australia) Rennae Stubbs
- Runners-up: (Slovakia) Daniela Hantuchová (Japan) Ai Sugiyama
- Score: 6–7^{(6–8)}, 7–6^{(7–4)}, 6–3

Details
- Draw: 16
- Seeds: 4

Events
Singles	Doubles
← 2004 ·	Zurich Open	· 2006 →

Cara Black and Rennae Stubbs were the defending champions and successfully defended their title, defeating Daniela Hantuchová and Ai Sugiyama 6–7^{(6–8)}, 7–6^{(7–4)}, 6–3 in the final.

== Seeds ==
1. (United States) Lisa Raymond / (Australia) Samantha Stosur (semifinals)
2. (Zimbabwe) Cara Black / (Australia) Rennae Stubbs (champions)
3. (Spain) Conchita Martínez / (Spain) Virginia Ruano Pascual (quarterfinals)
4. (Russia) Svetlana Kuznetsova / (Australia) Alicia Molik (first round)

== Draw ==
=== Key ===
- Q = Qualifier
- WC = Wild card
- LL = Lucky loser
- Alt = Alternate
- SE = Special exempt
- PR = Protected ranking
- ITF = ITF entry
- JE = Junior exempt
- w/o = Walkover
- r = Retired
- d = Defaulted
- SR = Special ranking

First round
1	(United States) L Raymond (Australia) S Stosur	4	6	6
(Czech Republic) K Peschke (Italy) F Schiavone	6	4	3
Q	(Hungary) Á Szávay (Germany) J Wöhr	7^{7}	5	7
(Czech Republic) E Birnerová (Romania) A Vanc	6^{5}	7	5
4	(Russia) S Kuznetsova (Australia) A Molik	0	6^{3}
(Slovakia) D Hantuchová (Japan) A Sugiyama	6	7^{7}
(Czech Republic) I Benešová (Czech Republic) M Paštiková	5	2
(Russia) E Dementieva (Italy) F Pennetta	7	6
LL	(Poland) K Jans (Poland) A Rosolska	2	2
(Japan) S Asagoe (Slovenia) K Srebotnik	6	6
(Spain) A Medina Garrigues (Italy) R Vinci	2	2
3	(Spain) C Martínez (Spain) V Ruano Pascual	6	6
(Switzerland) P Schnyder (United States) C Morariu	6	6
WC	(Bulgaria) S Karatantcheva (France) V Razzano	1	3
(Greece) E Daniilidou (United States) J Russell	5	3
2	(Zimbabwe) C Black (Australia) R Stubbs	7	6

Quarterfinals
1	(United States) L Raymond (Australia) S Stosur	6	7^{7}
Q	(Hungary) Á Szávay (Germany) J Wöhr	2	6^{4}
(Slovakia) D Hantuchová (Japan) A Sugiyama	4	6	6
(Russia) E Dementieva (Italy) F Pennetta	6	2	4
(Japan) S Asagoe (Slovenia) K Srebotnik	6	6
3	(Spain) C Martínez (Spain) V Ruano Pascual	2	1
(Switzerland) P Schnyder (United States) C Morariu	3	1
2	(Zimbabwe) C Black (Australia) R Stubbs	6	6

Semifinals
1	(United States) L Raymond (Australia) S Stosur	6^{6}	3
(Slovakia) D Hantuchová (Japan) A Sugiyama	7^{8}	6
(Japan) S Asagoe (Slovenia) K Srebotnik	7^{7}	5	2
2	(Zimbabwe) C Black (Australia) R Stubbs	6^{5}	7	6

Final
(Slovakia) D Hantuchová (Japan) A Sugiyama	7^{8}	6^{4}	3
2	(Zimbabwe) C Black (Australia) R Stubbs	6^{6}	7^{7}	6
