= Lucinda Gibbs =

South African tennis player

- Country (sports): South Africa
- Born: 1 January 1976 (age 49); South Africa
- Turned pro: 1993
- Retired: 2001
- Plays: Right-handed
- Prize money: US$4,773

Singles
- Career record: 10–15
- Highest ranking: No. 816 (3 April 1995)

Doubles
- Career record: 30–21
- Career titles: 4 ITF
- Highest ranking: No. 442 (7 August 1995)
Medal record
Women's tennis
Representing South Africa
African Games
Bronze medal – third place	1995 Harare	Women's Doubles

Lucinda Gibbs (born 2 January 1976) is a retired South African tennis player.

Gibbs won four doubles titles on the ITF Circuit during her career. On 3 April 1995, she reached her best singles ranking of world No. 816. On 7 August 1995, she peaked at No. 442 in the doubles rankings.

In 1995, she played for South Africa in the 1995 African Games in Harare, Zimbabwe where she won the bronze medal in women's doubles.

== ITF finals ==
=== Doubles: 7 (4–3) ===
Result	No.	Date	Tournament	Surface	Partner	Opponents	Score
Win	1.	27 Sep 1993	Johannesburg, South Africa	Hard	(South Africa) Nannie de Villiers	(South Africa) Janine Humphreys (South Africa) Cindy Summers	6–1, 6–2
Win	2.	26 Mar 1995	Harare, Zimbabwe	Hard	(South Africa) Giselle Swart	(Australia) Elissa Burton (Zimbabwe) Cara Black	6–4, 7–6^{(4)}
Loss	1.	2 Apr 1995	Nairobi, Kenya	Hard	(South Africa) Giselle Swart	(Australia) Elissa Burton (Zimbabwe) Cara Black	3–6, 2–6
Loss	2.	6 Dec 1997	Pretoria, South Africa	Hard	(South Africa) Giselle Swart	(United Kingdom) Helen Crook (South Africa) Mareze Joubert	2–6, 5–7
Win	3.	22 Nov 1998	Benoni, South Africa	Hard	(South Africa) Giselle Swart	(South Africa) Karin Coetzee (South Africa) Carien Venter	6–2, 6–3
Loss	3.	29 Nov 1998	Benoni, South Africa	Hard	(South Africa) Giselle Swart	(South Africa) Delene Ackron (South Africa) Karen Bacon	7–5, 4–6, 5–7
Win	4.	18 Jun 2000	Benoni, South Africa	Hard	(South Africa) Giselle Swart	(South Africa) Natalie Grandin (South Africa) Nicole Rencken	2–6, 6–4, 6–4
