= 2006 Maria Sharapova tennis season =

Tennis player season

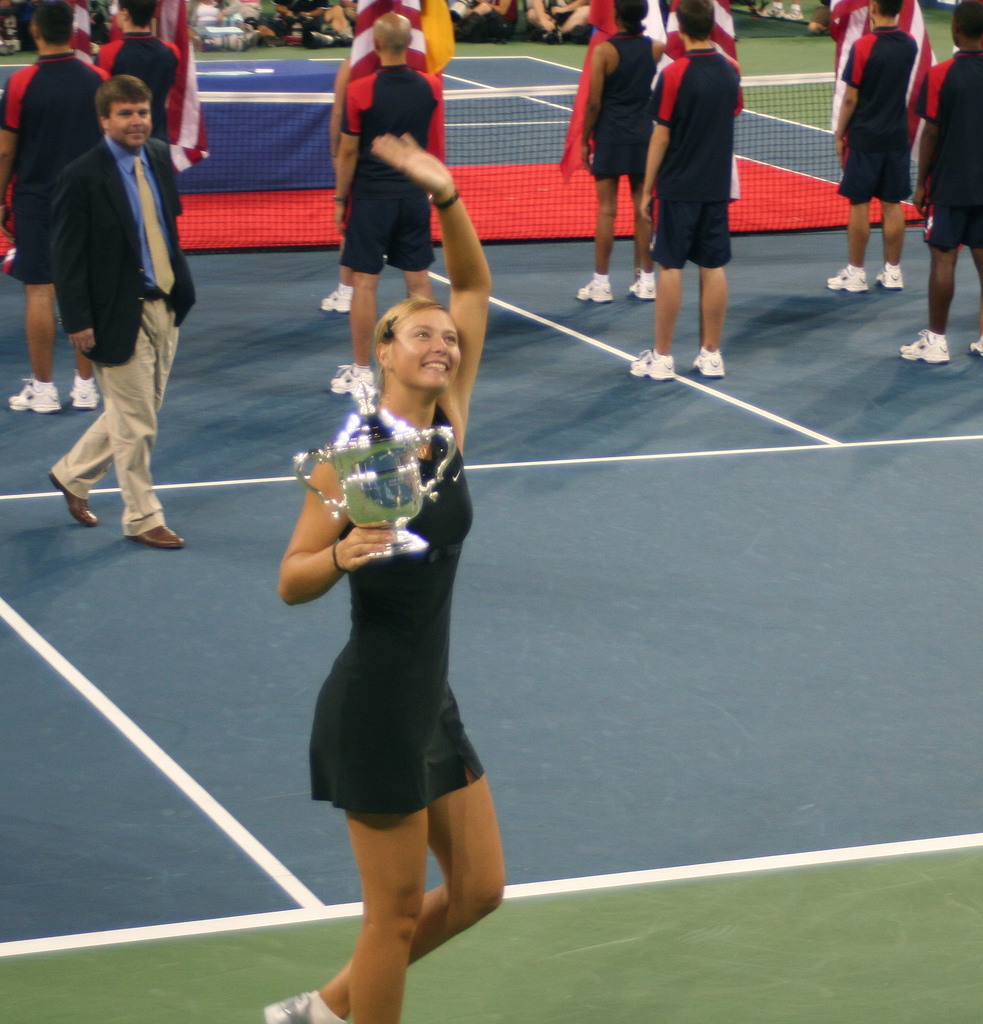
- Maria Sharapova won her second Grand Slam title at the US Open.
- Full name: Maria Sharapova
- Country: Russia

Singles
- Calendar titles: 5
- Year-end ranking: No. 2
- Ranking change from previous year: ▲2

Grand Slam & significant results
- Australian Open: SF
- French Open: 4R
- Wimbledon: SF
- US Open: W
- Last updated on: 3 February 2013.

Results and statistics from Maria Sharapova's 2006 tennis season.

== Yearly summary ==
=== Australian Open series ===
Maria Sharapova began her season at the Australian Open, as the fourth seed. After overcoming a tricky section which included Serena Williams and Daniela Hantuchová, she reached the semi-finals for the second (of four) consecutive year, where she fell in three sets to Justine Henin-Hardenne.

=== Indian Wells & Miami ===
Sharapova won her first title of the year at Indian Wells, by defeating compatriot Elena Dementieva in the final in straight sets; it was her first title since she won Birmingham in 2005, and it was the eleventh final out of the last thirteen contested in which she won. Her good form continued into Miami, where she also reached the final for the second consecutive year. However, she was defeated in straight sets by Svetlana Kuznetsova; this marked only the fourth final in which she lost. After the latter defeat, Sharapova took two months off the Tour to recover from a foot injury.

=== European clay court season ===
Sharapova was seeded fourth at the French Open. In the first round, she overcame Mashona Washington, saving three match points in the process. She then lost in the fourth round to Dinara Safina (after leading 5–1 in the final set), thus failing to make the quarter-finals of the French Open for the first time since 2003.

=== Wimbledon ===
Sharapova was again seeded fourth at Wimbledon, where she reached the semi-finals for the third consecutive year. After winning her first three matches in straight sets, she was more sternly tested by Flavia Pennetta in the fourth round, but still pulled through in three sets.

In the final eight, she faced first-time Wimbledon quarter-finalist Elena Dementieva and won through in straight sets after a streaker briefly interrupted the match in the second set.

In the semi-finals, she lost to Amélie Mauresmo, who eventually captured the title. This marked the fifth time since her Wimbledon victory in 2004 in which she lost to the eventual champion at a Major, and also the fifth time in which she was defeated in the semi-finals of a Major tournament.

=== US Open series ===
In the lead-up to the US Open, Sharapova captured her second title of the season by defeating Kim Clijsters in the final of the Acura Classic in San Diego, and in doing so claimed her first victory over the Belgian in five attempts.

Sharapova entered the US Open as the third seed. She defeated Michaëlla Krajicek, Émilie Loit, Elena Likhovtseva, Li Na and Tatiana Golovin all in straight sets, before being tested in three sets by World No. 1 Amélie Mauresmo, who had beaten her at Wimbledon earlier in the year. Sharapova would be too good for the Frenchwoman this time, winning in three sets, two of which were won without dropping a game. In the final, she faced Belgian Justine Henin-Hardenne, who had previously captured the title in 2003 (and would do so again in 2007), and recorded an impressive straight sets victory to claim her second Grand Slam title at just 19 years of age.

=== Fall series ===
After her success at the us open she won back to back titles at the tier 1 Zurich Open by defeating Shahar Pe'er, Timea Bacsinszky, Katarina Srebotnik, Daniela Hantuchova. She also won the tier 2 Linz Open by defeating Nadia Petrova in the final and thus taking her 5th title of the year.

=== WTA Tour Championships ===
Sharapova qualified for the year-end WTA Tour Championships for the third consecutive year, having captured five titles during the regular season. As the second seed, she was drawn in the Red Group along with Kim Clijsters, Svetlana Kuznetsova and Elena Dementieva. Sharapova went through the round robin stage undefeated, and thus qualified for the semi-finals after finishing first in the group.

The semi-final saw her up against Justine Henin-Hardenne for the fourth time in the year. Sharapova was defeated in straight sets, thus bringing an end to her otherwise impressive 2006 season.

== All matches ==
This table chronicles all the matches of Sharapova in 2006, including walkovers (W/O) which the WTA does not count as wins. They are marked ND for non-decision or no decision.

Key
W	F	SF	QF	#R	RR	Q#	P#	DNQ	A	Z#	PO	G	S	B	NMS	NTI	P	NH

(W) winner; (F) finalist; (SF) semifinalist; (QF) quarterfinalist; (#R) rounds 4, 3, 2, 1; (RR) round-robin stage; (Q#) qualification round; (P#) preliminary round; (DNQ) did not qualify; (A) absent; (Z#) Davis/Fed Cup Zonal Group (with number indication) or (PO) play-off; (G) gold, (S) silver or (B) bronze Olympic/Paralympic medal; (NMS) not a Masters tournament; (NTI) not a Tier I tournament; (P) postponed; (NH) not held; (SR) strike rate (events won / competed); (W–L) win–loss record.
To avoid confusion and double counting, these charts are updated at the conclusion of a tournament or when the player's participation has ended.

=== Singles matches ===
Tournament	#	Round	Opponent	Result	Score
Australian Open; Melbourne, Australia; Grand Slam; Hard, outdoor 16–29 January 2006
Australian Open; Melbourne, Australia; Grand Slam; Hard, outdoor 16–29 January 2006	1	1R	(Germany) Sandra Klösel	Win	6–2, 6–1
Australian Open; Melbourne, Australia; Grand Slam; Hard, outdoor 16–29 January 2006	2	2R	(United States) Ashley Harkleroad	Win	6–1, 7–5
Australian Open; Melbourne, Australia; Grand Slam; Hard, outdoor 16–29 January 2006	3	3R	(Croatia) Jelena Kostanić	Win	6–0, 6–1
Australian Open; Melbourne, Australia; Grand Slam; Hard, outdoor 16–29 January 2006	4	4R	(Slovakia) Daniela Hantuchová	Win	6–4, 6–4
Australian Open; Melbourne, Australia; Grand Slam; Hard, outdoor 16–29 January 2006	5	QF	(Russia) Nadia Petrova	Win	7–6^{(8–6)}, 6–4
Australian Open; Melbourne, Australia; Grand Slam; Hard, outdoor 16–29 January 2006	6	SF	(Belgium) Justine Henin-Hardenne	Loss	6–4, 1–6, 4–6
Pacific Life Open; Indian Wells, United States of America; Tier I Hard, outdoor 6–19 March 2006
Pacific Life Open; Indian Wells, United States of America; Tier I Hard, outdoor 6–19 March 2006		1R	Bye		
Pacific Life Open; Indian Wells, United States of America; Tier I Hard, outdoor 6–19 March 2006		2R	(United States) Jamea Jackson	Win	6–4, 6–3
Pacific Life Open; Indian Wells, United States of America; Tier I Hard, outdoor 6–19 March 2006		3R	(United States) Lisa Raymond	Win	6–4, 6–0
Pacific Life Open; Indian Wells, United States of America; Tier I Hard, outdoor 6–19 March 2006		4R	(Israel) Shahar Pe'er	Win	7–6^{(7–2)}, 6–1
Pacific Life Open; Indian Wells, United States of America; Tier I Hard, outdoor 6–19 March 2006		QF	(Germany) Anna-Lena Grönefeld	Win	6–1, 6–3
Pacific Life Open; Indian Wells, United States of America; Tier I Hard, outdoor 6–19 March 2006		SF	(Switzerland) Martina Hingis	Win	6–3, 6–3
Pacific Life Open; Indian Wells, United States of America; Tier I Hard, outdoor 6–19 March 2006		W	(Russia) Elena Dementieva	Win (1)	6–1, 6–2
NASDAQ-100 Open; Miami, United States of America; Tier I Hard, outdoor 20 March–2 April 2006
NASDAQ-100 Open; Miami, United States of America; Tier I Hard, outdoor 20 March–2 April 2006		1R	Bye		
NASDAQ-100 Open; Miami, United States of America; Tier I Hard, outdoor 20 March–2 April 2006		2R	(China) Li Na	Win	6–2, 6–4
NASDAQ-100 Open; Miami, United States of America; Tier I Hard, outdoor 20 March–2 April 2006		3R	(Italy) Maria Elena Camerin	Win	6–2, 7–6^{(7–2)}
NASDAQ-100 Open; Miami, United States of America; Tier I Hard, outdoor 20 March–2 April 2006		4R	(Russia) Maria Kirilenko	Win	3–6, 6–4, 6–1
NASDAQ-100 Open; Miami, United States of America; Tier I Hard, outdoor 20 March–2 April 2006		QF	(Russia) Anastasia Myskina	Win	6–4, 6–4
NASDAQ-100 Open; Miami, United States of America; Tier I Hard, outdoor 20 March–2 April 2006		SF	(France) Tatiana Golovin	Win	6–3, 6–7^{(5–7)}, 4–3, ret.
NASDAQ-100 Open; Miami, United States of America; Tier I Hard, outdoor 20 March–2 April 2006		F	(Russia) Svetlana Kuznetsova	Loss (2)	4–6, 3–6
French Open; Paris, France; Grand Slam; Clay, outdoor 28 May–11 June 2006
French Open; Paris, France; Grand Slam; Clay, outdoor 28 May–11 June 2006		1R	(United States) Mashona Washington	Win	6–2, 5–7, 7–5
French Open; Paris, France; Grand Slam; Clay, outdoor 28 May–11 June 2006		2R	(Czech Republic) Iveta Benešová	Win	6–4, 6–1
French Open; Paris, France; Grand Slam; Clay, outdoor 28 May–11 June 2006		3R	(Australia) Alicia Molik	Win	6–0, 7–5
French Open; Paris, France; Grand Slam; Clay, outdoor 28 May–11 June 2006		4R	(Russia) Dinara Safina	Loss	5–7, 6–2, 5–7
Wimbledon; London, Great Britain; Grand Slam; Grass, outdoor 26 June–9 July 2006
Wimbledon; London, Great Britain; Grand Slam; Grass, outdoor 26 June–9 July 2006		1R	(Israel) Anna Smashnova	Win	6–2, 6–0
Wimbledon; London, Great Britain; Grand Slam; Grass, outdoor 26 June–9 July 2006		2R	(United States) Ashley Harkleroad	Win	6–2, 6–2
Wimbledon; London, Great Britain; Grand Slam; Grass, outdoor 26 June–9 July 2006		3R	(United States) Amy Frazier	Win	6–3, 6–2
Wimbledon; London, Great Britain; Grand Slam; Grass, outdoor 26 June–9 July 2006		4R	(Italy) Flavia Pennetta	Win	7–6^{(7–5)}, 3–6, 6–3
Wimbledon; London, Great Britain; Grand Slam; Grass, outdoor 26 June–9 July 2006		QF	(Russia) Elena Dementieva	Win	6–1, 6–4
Wimbledon; London, Great Britain; Grand Slam; Grass, outdoor 26 June–9 July 2006		SF	(France) Amélie Mauresmo	Loss	3–6, 6–3, 2–6
Acura Classic; San Diego, United States of America; Tier I Hard, outdoor 29 July–6 August 2006
Acura Classic; San Diego, United States of America; Tier I Hard, outdoor 29 July–6 August 2006		1R	Bye		
Acura Classic; San Diego, United States of America; Tier I Hard, outdoor 29 July–6 August 2006		2R	(Russia) Vasilisa Bardina	Win	6–4, 6–1
Acura Classic; San Diego, United States of America; Tier I Hard, outdoor 29 July–6 August 2006		3R	(Russia) Vera Zvonareva	Win	6–4, 6–4
Acura Classic; San Diego, United States of America; Tier I Hard, outdoor 29 July–6 August 2006		QF	(France) Mary Pierce	Win	6–2, 6–3
Acura Classic; San Diego, United States of America; Tier I Hard, outdoor 29 July–6 August 2006		SF	(Switzerland) Patty Schnyder	Win	7–5, 6–4
Acura Classic; San Diego, United States of America; Tier I Hard, outdoor 29 July–6 August 2006		W	(Belgium) Kim Clijsters	Win (2)	7–5, 7–5
US Open; New York City, United States of America; Grand Slam; Hard, outdoor 28 August–10 September 2006
US Open; New York City, United States of America; Grand Slam; Hard, outdoor 28 August–10 September 2006		1R	(Netherlands) Michaëlla Krajicek	Win	6–3, 6–0
US Open; New York City, United States of America; Grand Slam; Hard, outdoor 28 August–10 September 2006		2R	(France) Émilie Loit	Win	6–0, 6–1
US Open; New York City, United States of America; Grand Slam; Hard, outdoor 28 August–10 September 2006		3R	(Russia) Elena Likhovtseva	Win	6–3, 6–2
US Open; New York City, United States of America; Grand Slam; Hard, outdoor 28 August–10 September 2006		4R	(China) Li Na	Win	6–4, 6–2
US Open; New York City, United States of America; Grand Slam; Hard, outdoor 28 August–10 September 2006		QF	(France) Tatiana Golovin	Win	7–6^{(7–4)}, 7–6^{(7–0)}
US Open; New York City, United States of America; Grand Slam; Hard, outdoor 28 August–10 September 2006		SF	(France) Amélie Mauresmo	Win	6–0, 4–6, 6–0
US Open; New York City, United States of America; Grand Slam; Hard, outdoor 28 August–10 September 2006		W	(Belgium) Justine Henin-Hardenne	Win (3)	6–4, 6–4
Zurich Open; Zurich, Switzerland; Tier I Hard, indoor 16–22 October 2006
Zurich Open; Zurich, Switzerland; Tier I Hard, indoor 16–22 October 2006		1R	Bye		
Zurich Open; Zurich, Switzerland; Tier I Hard, indoor 16–22 October 2006		2R	(Israel) Shahar Pe'er	Win	6–4, 7–6^{(7–4)}
Zurich Open; Zurich, Switzerland; Tier I Hard, indoor 16–22 October 2006		QF	(Switzerland) Timea Bacsinszky	Win	6–4, 6–3
Zurich Open; Zurich, Switzerland; Tier I Hard, indoor 16–22 October 2006		SF	(Slovenia) Katarina Srebotnik	Win	7–6^{(7–3)}, 6–2
Zurich Open; Zurich, Switzerland; Tier I Hard, indoor 16–22 October 2006		W	(Slovakia) Daniela Hantuchová	Win (4)	6–1, 4–6, 6–3
Generali Ladies Linz; Linz, Austria; Tier II; Hard, indoor 23–29 October 2006
Generali Ladies Linz; Linz, Austria; Tier II; Hard, indoor 23–29 October 2006		1R	Bye		
Generali Ladies Linz; Linz, Austria; Tier II; Hard, indoor 23–29 October 2006		2R	(Greece) Eleni Daniilidou	Win	7–5, 6–1
Generali Ladies Linz; Linz, Austria; Tier II; Hard, indoor 23–29 October 2006		QF	(Serbia and Montenegro) Ana Ivanovic	Win	7–6^{(7–3)}, 7–5
Generali Ladies Linz; Linz, Austria; Tier II; Hard, indoor 23–29 October 2006		SF	(Switzerland) Patty Schnyder	Win	7–5, 7–5
Generali Ladies Linz; Linz, Austria; Tier II; Hard, indoor 23–29 October 2006		W	(Russia) Nadia Petrova	Win (5)	7–5, 6–2
WTA Tour Championships; Madrid, Spain; WTA Tour Championships; Hard, indoor 7–12 November 2006
WTA Tour Championships; Madrid, Spain; WTA Tour Championships; Hard, indoor 7–12 November 2006		RR	(Russia) Svetlana Kuznetsova	Win	6–1, 6–4
WTA Tour Championships; Madrid, Spain; WTA Tour Championships; Hard, indoor 7–12 November 2006		RR	(Belgium) Kim Clijsters	Win	6–4, 6–4
WTA Tour Championships; Madrid, Spain; WTA Tour Championships; Hard, indoor 7–12 November 2006		RR	(Russia) Elena Dementieva	Win	6–1, 6–4
WTA Tour Championships; Madrid, Spain; WTA Tour Championships; Hard, indoor 7–12 November 2006		SF	(Belgium) Justine Henin-Hardenne	Loss	2–6, 6–7^{(5–7)}

== Tournament schedule ==
=== Singles Schedule ===
Date	Championship	Location	Category	Surface	Prev. result	New result	Outcome
16 January 2006– 29 January 2006	Australian Open	Melbourne (AUS)	Grand Slam tournament	Hard	SF	SF	Lost in the semi-finals against Justine Henin-Hardenne
6 March 2006– 19 March 2006	Pacific Life Open	Indian Wells (USA)	Tier I	Hard	SF	W	Won in the final against Elena Dementieva
20 March 2006– 2 April 2006	NASDAQ-100 Open	Miami (USA)	Tier I	Hard	F	F	Lost in the final against Svetlana Kuznetsova
28 May 2006– 11 June 2006	French Open	Paris (FRA)	Grand Slam tournament	Clay	QF	4R	Lost in the fourth round against Dinara Safina
26 June 2006– 9 July 2006	The Championships, Wimbledon	London (GBR)	Grand Slam tournament	Grass	SF	SF	Lost in the semi-finals against Amélie Mauresmo
29 July 2006– 6 August 2006	Acura Classic	San Diego (USA)	Tier I	Hard	DNP	W	Won in the final against Kim Clijsters
28 August 2006– 10 September 2006	US Open	New York (USA)	Grand Slam tournament	Hard	SF	W	Won in the final against Justine Henin-Hardenne
16 October 2006– 22 October 2006	Zurich Open	Zurich (SUI)	Tier I	Hard (i)	DNP	W	Won in the final against Daniela Hantuchová
23 October 2006– 29 October 2006	Generali Ladies Linz	Linz (AUT)	Tier II	Hard (i)	DNP	W	Won in the final against Nadia Petrova
7 November 2006– 12 November 2006	WTA Tour Championships	Madrid (ESP)	WTA Tour Championships	Hard	SF	SF	Lost in the semi-finals against Justine Henin-Hardenne

== Yearly Records ==
=== Head-to-head matchups ===
Ordered by number of wins

- (Russia) Elena Dementieva 3–1
- (Switzerland) Martina Hingis 2–1
- (Slovakia) Daniela Hantuchova 2–0
- (Israel) Shahar Peer 2–0
- (United States) Ashley Harkleroad 2–0
- (Greece) Eleni Daniilidou 1–0
- (Croatia) Jelena Kostanic Tosic 1–0
- (Serbia) Ana Ivanovic 1–0
- (Germany) Sandra Kloese 1–0
- (Belgium) Kim Clijsters 1–2
- (Russia) Svetlana Kuznetsova 1–1
- (Russia) Nadia Petrova 2–0
- (Switzerland) Patty Schnyder 2–0
- (Belgium) Justine Henin 2–2
- (Switzerland) Timea Bacsinszky 1–0
- (Slovenia) Katarina Srebotnik 1–0
- (Slovakia) Daniela Hantuchova 2–0
- (Russia) Ekaterina Bychkova 1–0
- (France) Marion Bartoli 1–0
- (Russia) Dinara Safina 1–1
- (Australia) Anastasia Rodionova 1–0
- (Russia) Anna Chakvetadze 0–1

=== Finals ===
==== Singles: 7 (5–2) ====
Category Grand Slam (1–0) WTA Tier I (3–1) WTA Tier II (1–1)	Titles by surface Hard (5–2)	Titles by conditions Outdoors (3–2) Indoors (2–0)

Outcome	No.	Date	Championship	Surface	Opponent in the final	Score in the final
Runner-up	3.	February 26, 2006	Dubai, United Arab Emirates	Hard	(Belgium) Justine Henin-Hardenne	5–7, 2–6
Winner	11.	March 19, 2006	(United States) Indian Wells, USA (1)	Hard	(Russia) Elena Dementieva	6–1, 6–2
Runner-up	4.	April 1, 2006	(United States) Miami, USA (2)	Hard	(Russia) Svetlana Kuznetsova	4–6, 3–6
Winner	12.	August 6, 2006	(United States) San Diego, USA (1)	Hard	(Belgium) Kim Clijsters	7–5, 7–5
Winner	13.	September 9, 2006	(United States) New York City, USA (1)	Hard	(Belgium) Justine Henin-Hardenne	4–6, 4–6
Winner	14.	October 22, 2006	Zurich, Switzerland	Hard (i)	(Slovakia) Daniela Hantuchová	6–1, 4–6, 6–3
Winner	15.	October 29, 2006	Linz, Austria	Hard (i)	(Russia) Nadia Petrova	7–5, 6–2

== See also ==
- 2006 Serena Williams tennis season
- 2006 WTA Tour
