= 2005 JPMorgan Chase Open =

- Date: August 8–14
- Edition: 32nd
- Category: Tier II
- Draw: 56S / 16D
- Prize money: $585,000
- Surface: Hard / outdoor
- Location: Carson, California, U.S.

Champions

Singles
- (Belgium) Kim Clijsters

Doubles
- (Russia) Elena Dementieva / (Italy) Flavia Pennetta
← 2004 ·	WTA Los Angeles	· 2006 →

The 2005 JPMorgan Chase Open was a women's tennis tournament played on outdoor hard courts. It was part of the Tier II Series of the 2005 WTA Tour. It was the 32nd edition of the tournament and took place in Carson, California, United States, from August 8 through August 14, 2005. Fifth-seeded Kim Clijsters won the singles title, her second at the event after 2003, and earned $93,000 first-prize money.

== Finals ==
=== Singles ===
(Belgium) Kim Clijsters defeated (Slovakia) Daniela Hantuchová, 6–4, 6–1

- It was Clijsters' 5th singles title of the year and the 26th of her career.

=== Doubles ===
(Russia) Elena Dementieva / (Italy) Flavia Pennetta defeated (United States) Angela Haynes / (United States) Bethanie Mattek, 6–2, 6–4
