= 2005 JPMorgan Chase Open – Singles =

Singles
- 2005 JPMorgan Chase Open

Final
- Champion: (Belgium) Kim Clijsters
- Runner-up: (Slovakia) Daniela Hantuchová
- Score: 6–4, 6–1

Details
- Draw: 56
- Seeds: 16

Events
Singles	Doubles
- WTA Los Angeles

Lindsay Davenport was the defending champion, but withdrew due to a lower-back strain.

Kim Clijsters won the title, defeating Daniela Hantuchová 6–4, 6–1 in the final.

== Seeds ==
The top eight seeds receive a bye into the second round.

1. (Russia) Maria Sharapova (quarterfinals, withdrew due to a strained chest muscle)
2. (Russia) Svetlana Kuznetsova (second round)
3. (Russia) Elena Dementieva (semifinals)
4. (Russia) Nadia Petrova (quarterfinals)
5. (Belgium) Kim Clijsters (champion)
6. (France) ~~Mary Pierce~~ (withdrew due to a right thigh strain)
7. (Russia) ~~Vera Zvonareva~~ (withdrew due to a left ankle sprain)
8. (Russia) ~~Elena Likhovtseva~~ (withdrew due to a gastro intestinal illness)
9. (Slovakia) Daniela Hantuchová (final)
10. (Italy) Flavia Pennetta (first round)
11. (Japan) Shinobu Asagoe (first round)
12. (Russia) Dinara Safina (third round)
13. (Italy) Francesca Schiavone (semifinals)
14. (Argentina) Gisela Dulko (second round)
15. (Czech Republic) Klára Koukalová (third round)
16. (Russia) Anna Chakvetadze (third round)
17. (France) Marion Bartoli (third round)

== Draw ==
Key

- Q = Qualifier
- WC = Wild card
- LL = Lucky loser
- Alt = Alternate
- ITF = ITF entry
- PR = Protected ranking
- SR = Special ranking
- SE = Special exempt
- JE = Junior exempt
- JR = Junior Accelerator Programme entrant
- CO = College Accelerator Programme entrant
- NG = Next Gen Accelerator Program entrant
- w/o = Walkover
- r = Retired
- d = Defaulted

=== Finals ===
Quarterfinals
1	(Russia) Maria Sharapova
9	(Slovakia) Daniela Hantuchová	w/o
3	(Russia) Elena Dementieva	6	6
Q	(Italy) Tathiana Garbin	1	1
5	(Belgium) Kim Clijsters	6	6
4	(Russia) Nadia Petrova	4	2
13	(Italy) Francesca Schiavone	7	6
(Spain) Conchita Martínez	5	4

Semifinals
9	(Slovakia) Daniela Hantuchová	6	6
3	(Russia) Elena Dementieva	3	4
5	(Belgium) Kim Clijsters	6	6
13	(Italy) Francesca Schiavone	2	4

Final
9	(Slovakia) Daniela Hantuchová	4	1
5	(Belgium) Kim Clijsters	6	6

=== Top half ===
==== Section 1 ====
First round
(Russia) M Kirilenko	4	7	6
WC	(United States) M Irvin	6	5	2
(India) S Mirza	3	6	4
(Czech Republic) I Benešová	6	1	6
(China) N Li	5	4
16	(Russia) A Chakvetadze	7	6
11	(Japan) S Asagoe	7^{7}	3	0
(China) J Zheng	6^{3}	6	6
(Russia) E Linetskaya	0	3
Q	(Ukraine) K Bondarenko	6	6
Q	(United States) A Haynes	6	7
(Poland) M Domachowska	4	5

Second round
1	(Russia) M Sharapova	7^{9}	6
(Russia) M Kirilenko	6^{7}	2
(Czech Republic) I Benešová	5	6	4
16	(Russia) A Chakvetadze	7	4	6
(China) J Zheng	6	5	0
Q	(Ukraine) K Bondarenko	4	7	6
Q	(United States) A Haynes	6	1	2
9	(Slovakia) D Hantuchová	4	6	6

Third round
1	(Russia) M Sharapova	4	6	7
16	(Russia) A Chakvetadze	6	4	5
Q	(Ukraine) K Bondarenko	4	4
9	(Slovakia) D Hantuchová	6	6

Quarterfinals
1	(Russia) M Sharapova
9	(Slovakia) D Hantuchová	w/o

==== Section 2 ====
First round
(Russia) A Jidkova	3	2
(Australia) S Stosur	6	6
LL	(Brazil) MF Alves	0	1
Q	(China) T Sun	6	6
(Italy) ME Camerin	1	4
17	(France) M Bartoli	6	6
10	(Italy) F Pennetta	3	4
Q	(Japan) A Nakamura	6	6
WC	(United States) L Osterloh	0	2
(United States) L Raymond	6	6
LL	(United States) B Mattek	4	2
Q	(Italy) T Garbin	6	6

Second round
3	(Russia) E Dementieva	6	6
(Australia) S Stosur	4	3
Q	(China) T Sun	7^{7}	3	1
17	(France) M Bartoli	6^{4}	6	6
Q	(Japan) A Nakamura	6	6^{5}	3
(United States) L Raymond	2	7^{7}	6
Q	(Italy) T Garbin	6	6
LL	(Japan) S Obata	4	1

Third round
3	(Russia) E Dementieva	6	7^{7}
17	(France) M Bartoli	3	6^{4}
(United States) L Raymond	4	3
Q	(Italy) T Garbin	6	6

Quarterfinals
3	(Russia) E Dementieva	6	6
Q	(Italy) T Garbin	1	1

=== Bottom half ===
==== Section 3 ====
First round
(Croatia) K Šprem	6	7^{13}
Q	(Ukraine) Y Fedak	4	6^{11}
Q	(Japan) R Fujiwara	6	6
(Italy) A Serra Zanetti	0	2
(Puerto Rico) K Brandi	6^{5}	3
12	(Russia) D Safina	7^{7}	6
15	(Czech Republic) K Koukalová	7^{7}	6
PR	(Slovenia) M Matevžič	6^{3}	1
(United States) A Frazier	7^{8}	6
(United States) A Spears	6^{6}	0
(Spain) V Ruano Pascual	0	6	3
WC	(United States) J Craybas	6	4	6

Second round
5	(Belgium) K Clijsters	6	6
(Croatia) K Šprem	2	1
Q	(Japan) R Fujiwara	2	5
12	(Russia) D Safina	6	7
15	(Czech Republic) K Koukalová	6	4	6
(United States) A Frazier	3	6	3
WC	(United States) J Craybas	3	1
4	(Russia) N Petrova	6	6

Third round
5	(Belgium) K Clijsters	6	7
12	(Russia) D Safina	0	5
15	(Czech Republic) K Koukalová	2	4
4	(Russia) N Petrova	6	6

Quarterfinals
5	(Belgium) K Clijsters	6	6
4	(Russia) N Petrova	4	2

==== Section 4 ====
First round
LL	(Russia) G Voskoboeva	1	6^{6}
LL	(Uzbekistan) V Lepchenko	6	7^{8}
(Venezuela) M Vento-Kabchi	6^{5}	0
(China) S Peng	7^{7}	6
(Madagascar) D Randriantefy	5	3
13	(Italy) F Schiavone	7	6
14	(Argentina) G Dulko	6	6
(Colombia) F Zuluaga	3	3
(United States) M Washington	1	4
(Spain) C Martínez	6	6
(Greece) E Daniilidou	7^{7}	7
Q	(Argentina) ME Salerni	6^{2}	5

Second round
LL	(Croatia) S Talaja	4	2
LL	(Uzbekistan) V Lepchenko	6	6
(China) S Peng	6	6^{1}	4
13	(Italy) F Schiavone	4	7^{7}	6
14	(Argentina) G Dulko	4	2
(Spain) C Martínez	6	6
(Greece) E Daniilidou	6	6
2	(Russia) S Kuznetsova	4	4

Third round
LL	(Uzbekistan) V Lepchenko	3	6	3
13	(Italy) F Schiavone	6	2	6
(Spain) C Martínez	6
(Greece) E Daniilidou	1	r

Quarterfinals
13	(Italy) F Schiavone	7	6
(Spain) C Martínez	5	4
