= 2004 JPMorgan Chase Open – Doubles =

Doubles
- 2004 JPMorgan Chase Open

Final
- Champions: (Russia) Nadia Petrova (United States) Meghann Shaughnessy
- Runners-up: (Spain) Conchita Martínez (Spain) Virginia Ruano Pascual
- Score: 6–7^{(2–7)}, 6–4, 6–3

Details
- Draw: 16
- Seeds: 4

Events
Singles	Doubles
← 2003 ·	WTA Los Angeles	· 2005 →

Mary Pierce and Rennae Stubbs were the defending champions, but had different outcomes. While Pierce did not compete this year, Stubbs partnered with Cara Black, but they lost in first round to Daniela Hantuchová and Chanda Rubin.

Nadia Petrova and Meghann Shaughnessy won the title, defeating Conchita Martínez and Virginia Ruano Pascual 6–7^{(2–7)}, 6–4, 6–3 in the final. It was the 5th title of the year for the pair, and the 9th title for both Petrova and Shaughnessy in their respective careers.

== Seeds ==
1. (Russia) Svetlana Kuznetsova / (Russia) Elena Likhovtseva (quarterfinals)
2. (Zimbabwe) Cara Black / (Australia) Rennae Stubbs (first round)
3. (Spain) Conchita Martínez / (Spain) Virginia Ruano Pascual (final)
4. (Russia) Nadia Petrova / (United States) Meghann Shaughnessy (champions)

== Draw ==
=== Key ===
- Q = Qualifier
- WC = Wild card
- LL = Lucky loser
- Alt = Alternate
- SE = Special exempt
- PR = Protected ranking
- ITF = ITF entry
- JE = Junior exempt
- w/o = Walkover
- r = Retired
- d = Defaulted
- SR = Special ranking

=== Draw ===
First round
1	(Russia) S Kuznetsova (Russia) E Likhovtseva	6	6
(Argentina) G Dulko (Argentina) P Tarabini	3	4
(Greece) E Daniilidou (Australia) N Pratt	6	3	2
(Thailand) T Tanasugarn (Venezuela) M Vento-Kabchi	2	6	6
3	(Spain) C Martínez (Spain) V Ruano Pascual	4	6	6
(Japan) S Asagoe (Japan) A Sugiyama	6	3	4
(Italy) S Farina Elia (Italy) F Schiavone	1	6	4
(France) M Bartoli (Croatia) J Kostanić	6	4	6
Q	(United States) A Haynes (Luxembourg) A Kremer	4	6^{4}
(Italy) T Garbin (Hungary) P Mandula	6	7^{7}
(Russia) E Dementieva (Russia) V Zvonareva	1	2
4	(Russia) N Petrova (United States) M Shaughnessy	6	6
WC	(United States) J Craybas (United States) A Harkleroad	1	6^{5}
(Austria) B Schett (Switzerland) P Schnyder	6	7^{7}
WC	(Slovakia) D Hantuchová (United States) C Rubin	1	6	7^{7}
2	(Zimbabwe) C Black (Australia) R Stubbs	6	2	6^{3}

Quarterfinals
1	(Russia) S Kuznetsova (Russia) E Likhovtseva	4	3
(Thailand) T Tanasugarn (Venezuela) M Vento-Kabchi	6	6
3	(Spain) C Martínez (Spain) V Ruano Pascual	7^{7}	7
(France) M Bartoli (Croatia) J Kostanić	6^{4}	5
(Italy) T Garbin (Hungary) P Mandula	2	2
4	(Russia) N Petrova (United States) M Shaughnessy	6	6
(Austria) B Schett (Switzerland) P Schnyder	6	6
WC	(Slovakia) D Hantuchová (United States) C Rubin	2	0

Semifinals
(Thailand) T Tanasugarn (Venezuela) M Vento-Kabchi	2	1
3	(Spain) C Martínez (Spain) V Ruano Pascual	6	6
4	(Russia) N Petrova (United States) M Shaughnessy	6	6
(Austria) B Schett (Switzerland) P Schnyder	2	1

Final
3	(Spain) C Martínez (Spain) V Ruano Pascual	7^{7}	4	3
4	(Russia) N Petrova (United States) M Shaughnessy	6^{2}	6	6
