= 2003 JPMorgan Chase Open – Singles =

Singles
- 2003 JPMorgan Chase Open

Final
- Champion: (Belgium) Kim Clijsters
- Runner-up: (United States) Lindsay Davenport
- Score: 6–1, 3–6, 6–1

Details
- Draw: 48 (4WC/4Q/1LL)
- Seeds: 16

Events
Singles	Doubles
- LA Women's Tennis Championships

Chanda Rubin was the defending champion, but was forced to withdraw due to a right shoulder tendonitis. However, she recovered in time to compete in the doubles tournament, losing in the first round.

Kim Clijsters won the title by defeating Lindsay Davenport 6–1, 3–6, 6–1 in the final. This victory allowed Clijsters to reach the World No. 1 ranking, ending the 57-week reign of Serena Williams.

== Seeds ==
All seeds received a bye into the second round.

1. (Belgium) Kim Clijsters (champion)
2. (United States) Lindsay Davenport (final)
3. (United States) ~~Chanda Rubin~~ (withdrew due to a right shoulder tendonitis)
4. (Japan) Ai Sugiyama (semifinals)
5. (Federal Republic of Yugoslavia) Jelena Dokic (second round)
6. (Bulgaria) Magdalena Maleeva (quarterfinals)
7. (Spain) Conchita Martínez (third round)
8. (South Africa) Amanda Coetzer (quarterfinals)
9. (Russia) Elena Dementieva (second round)
10. (United States) Meghann Shaughnessy (third round)
11. (Italy) Silvia Farina Elia (third round)
12. (Greece) Eleni Daniilidou (second round)
13. (Russia) Elena Bovina (second round)
14. (Russia) Nadia Petrova (second round)
15. (United States) Alexandra Stevenson (second round, retired)
16. (Italy) Francesca Schiavone (semifinals)

== Draw ==
Key

- Q = Qualifier
- WC = Wild card
- LL = Lucky loser
- Alt = Alternate
- ITF = ITF entry
- PR = Protected ranking
- SR = Special ranking
- SE = Special exempt
- JE = Junior exempt
- JR = Junior Accelerator Programme entrant
- CO = College Accelerator Programme entrant
- NG = Next Gen Accelerator Program entrant
- w/o = Walkover
- r = Retired
- d = Defaulted

=== Finals ===
Quarterfinals
1	(Belgium) Kim Clijsters	6	6
(Russia) Svetlana Kuznetsova	3	1
16	(Italy) Francesca Schiavone	6	6
Q	(Australia) Nicole Pratt	2	3
6	(Bulgaria) Magdalena Maleeva	2	6	2
4	(Japan) Ai Sugiyama	6	4	6
8	(South Africa) Amanda Coetzer	2	4
2	(United States) Lindsay Davenport	6	6

Semifinals
1	(Belgium) Kim Clijsters	7	6
16	(Italy) Francesca Schiavone	5	4
4	(Japan) Ai Sugiyama	2	1
2	(United States) Lindsay Davenport	6	6

Final
1	(Belgium) Kim Clijsters	6	3	6
2	(United States) Lindsay Davenport	1	6	1

=== Top half ===
==== Section 1 ====
First round
(South Korea) Y-j Cho	3	2
(France) É Loit	6	6
(Slovenia) K Srebotnik	3	1
(Russia) M Sharapova	6	6
(Japan) S Asagoe	6	3	6
Q	(Belgium) E Callens	3	6	3
(Russia) S Kuznetsova	6	7^{7}
(Spain) M Serna	3	6^{3}

Second round
1	(Belgium) K Clijsters	6	6
(France) É Loit	1	1
(Russia) M Sharapova	6	2	7
14	(Russia) N Petrova	2	6	5
11	(Italy) S Farina Elia	7	2	6
(Japan) S Asagoe	5	6	4
(Russia) S Kuznetsova	4	7^{7}	6
5	(Federal Republic of Yugoslavia) J Dokic	6	6^{5}	3

Third round
1	(Belgium) K Clijsters	6	1	6
(Russia) M Sharapova	4	6	1
11	(Italy) S Farina Elia	7^{7}	4	5
(Russia) S Kuznetsova	6^{4}	6	7

Quarterfinals
1	(Belgium) K Clijsters	6	6
(Russia) S Kuznetsova	3	1

==== Section 2 ====
First round
(Slovakia) J Husárová	3	7	4
(Italy) R Grande	6	5	6
(Thailand) T Tanasugarn	7^{7}	6
WC	(France) M Pierce	6^{2}	3
(Spain) M Sánchez Lorenzo	6^{1}	4
Q	(Australia) N Pratt	7^{7}	6
(France) M Bartoli	3	2^{r}
Q	(United States) T Snyder	6	4

Second round
LL	(Indonesia) A Widjaja	4	6	4
(Italy) R Grande	6	1	6
(Thailand) T Tanasugarn	7	3	0
16	(Italy) F Schiavone	5	6	6
12	(Greece) E Daniilidou	2	7^{7}	3
Q	(Australia) N Pratt	6	6^{5}	6
Q	(United States) T Snyder	4	3
7	(Spain) C Martínez	6	6

Third round
(Italy) R Grande	3	0
16	(Italy) F Schiavone	6	6
Q	(Australia) N Pratt	4	6	6
7	(Spain) C Martínez	6	4	4

Quarterfinals
16	(Italy) F Schiavone	6	6
Q	(Australia) N Pratt	2	3

=== Bottom half ===
==== Section 3 ====
First round
(Russia) E Likhovtseva	6	6
(Japan) A Morigami	1	1
(Spain) V Ruano Pascual	7	6
(Zimbabwe) C Black	5	3
WC	(Ukraine) V Kutuzova	6	6
(Russia) L Krasnoroutskaya	4	4
(France) V Razzano	6	2	3
WC	(Japan) S Obata	2	6	6

Second round
6	(Bulgaria) M Maleeva	6	6
(Russia) E Likhovtseva	3	3
(Spain) V Ruano Pascual	6	5	7
9	(Russia) E Dementieva	3	7	5
15	(United States) A Stevenson	3	3^{r}
WC	(Ukraine) V Kutuzova	6	3
WC	(Japan) S Obata	6	3	3
4	(Japan) A Sugiyama	2	6	6

Third round
6	(Bulgaria) M Maleeva	6	6
(Spain) V Ruano Pascual	0	3
WC	(Ukraine) V Kutuzova	2	3
4	(Japan) A Sugiyama	6	6

Quarterfinals
6	(Bulgaria) M Maleeva	2	6	2
4	(Japan) A Sugiyama	6	4	6

==== Section 4 ====
First round
Q	(Spain) A Parra Santonja	6	6
WC	(United States) A Haynes	1	4
(Slovenia) T Pisnik	1	3
(Colombia) F Zuluaga	6	6
(Argentina) P Suárez	6	6
(Australia) A Molik	4	4
(Austria) B Schett	4	6	6
(United States) A Frazier	6	4	4

Second round
8	(South Africa) A Coetzer	6	6
Q	(Spain) A Parra Santonja	1	1
(Colombia) F Zuluaga	6	3	6^{4}
10	(United States) M Shaughnessy	3	6	7^{7}
13	(Russia) E Bovina	6	5	5
(Argentina) P Suárez	2	7	7
(Austria) B Schett	3	1
2	(United States) L Davenport	6	6

Third round
8	(South Africa) A Coetzer	7^{7}	6
10	(United States) M Shaughnessy	6^{4}	3
(Argentina) P Suárez	6	2	4
2	(United States) L Davenport	4	6	6

Quarterfinals
8	(South Africa) A Coetzer	2	4
2	(United States) L Davenport	6	6
