= 2004 JPMorgan Chase Open =

- Date: July 19–25
- Edition: 31st
- Category: Tier II
- Draw: 56S / 16D
- Prize money: $585,000
- Surface: Hard / outdoor
- Location: Carson, California, U.S.

Champions

Singles
- (United States) Lindsay Davenport

Doubles
- (Russia) Nadia Petrova (United States) Meghann Shaughnessy
← 2003 ·	WTA Los Angeles	· 2005 →

The 2004 JPMorgan Chase Open was a women's tennis tournament played on outdoor hard courts in Carson, California in the United States that was part of the Tier II of the 2004 WTA Tour. It was the 31st edition of the tournament and held from July 19 through July 25, 2004. Third-seeded Lindsay Davenport won the singles title and earned $93,000 first-prize money.

== Finals ==
=== Singles ===
(United States) Lindsay Davenport defeated (United States) Serena Williams, 6–1, 6–3

- It was Davenport's 4th singles title of the year and the 42nd of her career.

=== Doubles ===
(Russia) Nadia Petrova / (United States) Meghann Shaughnessy defeated (Spain) Conchita Martínez / (Spain) Virginia Ruano Pascual, 6–7^{(2–7)}, 6–4, 6–3
