= 2006 JPMorgan Chase Open – Singles =

Singles
- 2006 JPMorgan Chase Open

Final
- Champion: (Russia) Elena Dementieva
- Runner-up: (Serbia and Montenegro) Jelena Janković
- Score: 6–3, 4–6, 6–4

Details
- Draw: 56
- Seeds: 16

Events
Singles	Doubles
- WTA Los Angeles

The 2006 JPMorgan Chase Open singles statistics are for the 2006 WTA Tour, a Women's Tennis Association (WTA) tennis competition.

== Tournament ==
Kim Clijsters was the defending champion, but did not compete this year.

Elena Dementieva won the title, defeating Jelena Janković 6–3, 4–6, 6–4 in the final. It was her second title of the year and the sixth title of her career.

== Seeds ==
The top eight seeds received a bye into the second round.

1. (Russia) Maria Sharapova (semifinals)
2. (Russia) Nadia Petrova (second round)
3. (Russia) Elena Dementieva (champion)
4. (United States) Lindsay Davenport (second round)
5. (Russia) Dinara Safina (quarterfinals)
6. (Germany) Anna-Lena Grönefeld (third round)
7. (Slovakia) Daniela Hantuchová (third round)
8. (Italy) Flavia Pennetta (second round)
9. (Japan) Ai Sugiyama (first round)
10. (Serbia and Montenegro) Ana Ivanovic (quarterfinals)
11. (Russia) Maria Kirilenko (first round)
12. (Slovenia) ~~Katarina Srebotnik~~ (withdrew due to a right achilles strain)
13. (Spain) Anabel Medina Garrigues (first round)
14. (Israel) Shahar Pe'er (third round)
15. (France) Marion Bartoli (third round)
16. (Serbia and Montenegro) Jelena Janković (final)
17. (France) Nathalie Dechy (first round)

== Draw ==
Key

- Q = Qualifier
- WC = Wild card
- LL = Lucky loser
- Alt = Alternate
- ITF = ITF entry
- PR = Protected ranking
- SR = Special ranking
- SE = Special exempt
- JE = Junior exempt
- JR = Junior Accelerator Programme entrant
- CO = College Accelerator Programme entrant
- NG = Next Gen Accelerator Program entrant
- w/o = Walkover
- r = Retired
- d = Defaulted

=== Finals ===
Quarterfinals
1	(Russia) Maria Sharapova	6	6
5	(Russia) Dinara Safina	2	4
3	(Russia) Elena Dementieva	4	6	6
WC	(United States) Bethanie Mattek	6	1	1
10	(Serbia and Montenegro) Ana Ivanovic	4	6^{6}
16	(Serbia and Montenegro) Jelena Janković	6	7^{8}
WC	(United States) Serena Williams	6^{4}	6	6
(United States) Meghann Shaughnessy	7^{7}	1	4

Semifinals
1	(Russia) Maria Sharapova	5	2
3	(Russia) Elena Dementieva	7	6
16	(Serbia and Montenegro) Jelena Janković	6	6
WC	(United States) Serena Williams	4	3

Final
3	(Russia) Elena Dementieva	6	4	6
16	(Serbia and Montenegro) Jelena Janković	3	6	4

=== Top half ===
==== Section 1 ====
First round
(Hungary) M Czink	6	3	5
Q	(Russia) A Rodionova	4	6	7
(United States) A Frazier	2	4
(United States) J Craybas	6	6
WC	(United States) A Haynes	2	2
15	(France) M Bartoli	6	6
9	(Japan) A Sugiyama	5	2
(United States) L Granville	7	6
(Argentina) M Díaz Oliva	7^{7}	7^{7}
Q	(United States) L Osterloh	6^{4}	6^{4}
(United States) V King	6	3
Q	(France) S Brémond	1	3^{r}

Second round
1	(Russia) M Sharapova	6	6
Q	(Russia) A Rodionova	3	1
(United States) J Craybas	2	0
15	(France) M Bartoli	6	6
(United States) L Granville	6	6
(Argentina) M Díaz Oliva	1	1
(United States) V King	6	5	2
5	(Russia) D Safina	1	7	6

Third round
1	(Russia) M Sharapova	6	6
15	(France) M Bartoli	1	2
(United States) L Granville	2	6^{2}
5	(Russia) D Safina	6	7^{7}

Quarterfinals
1	(Russia) M Sharapova	6	6
5	(Russia) D Safina	2	4

==== Section 2 ====
First round
Q	(Belarus) T Poutchek	7	3	3
(Germany) J Schruff	5	6	6
(Poland) M Domachowska	6	4	2
(Argentina) P Suárez	3	6	6
(China) S Peng	1	0
14	(Israel) S Pe'er	6	6
13	(Spain) A Medina Garrigues	4	3
(Russia) A Chakvetadze	6	6
(Czech Republic) H Šromová	6^{3}	5
(Ukraine) A Bondarenko	7^{7}	7
(Czech Republic) K Peschke	4	4
WC	(United States) B Mattek	6	6

Second round
3	(Russia) E Dementieva	6	7
(Germany) J Schruff	2	5
(Argentina) P Suárez	2	3
14	(Israel) S Pe'er	6	6
(Russia) A Chakvetadze	3	6	5
(Ukraine) A Bondarenko	6	4	7
WC	(United States) B Mattek	6	2	7
8	(Italy) F Pennetta	4	6	5

Third round
3	(Russia) E Dementieva	7	6
14	(Israel) S Pe'er	5	3
(Ukraine) A Bondarenko	1	1
WC	(United States) B Mattek	6	6

Quarterfinals
3	(Russia) E Dementieva	4	6	6
WC	(United States) B Mattek	6	1	1

=== Bottom half ===
==== Section 3 ====
First round
LL	(Ukraine) O Savchuk	2	2
(Japan) A Morigami	6	6
(Italy) M Santangelo	6	6
Q	(United States) A Rolle	3	1
(Russia) V Dushevina	3	1
10	(Serbia and Montenegro) A Ivanovic	6	6
16	(Serbia and Montenegro) J Janković	6	7^{7}
(India) S Mirza	2	6^{3}
(Czech Republic) L Šafářová	3	6	6
(Croatia) J Kostanić	6	4	1
Q	(United States) A Stevenson	4	2
(Australia) S Stosur	6	6

Second round
6	(Germany) A-L Grönefeld	6	6
(Japan) A Morigami	3	2
(Italy) M Santangelo	6^{4}	5
10	(Serbia and Montenegro) A Ivanovic	7^{7}	7
16	(Serbia and Montenegro) J Janković	7^{7}	6
(Czech Republic) L Šafářová	6^{4}	4
(Australia) S Stosur	6^{4}	6	6
4	(United States) L Davenport	7^{7}	4	3

Third round
6	(Germany) A-L Grönefeld	1	4
10	(Serbia and Montenegro) A Ivanovic	6	6
16	(Serbia and Montenegro) J Janković	6	6
(Australia) S Stosur	4	1

Quarterfinals
10	(Serbia and Montenegro) A Ivanovic	4	6^{6}
16	(Serbia and Montenegro) J Janković	6	7^{8}

==== Section 4 ====
First round
(France) V Razzano	4	2
(United States) L Raymond	6	6
Q	(China) M Yuan	4	6^{4}
(United States) A Harkleroad	6	7^{7}
WC	(United States) S Williams	6	6
11	(Russia) M Kirilenko	2	1
17	(France) N Dechy	6	4	4
(United States) M Shaughnessy	4	6	6
Q	(Russia) V Bardina	2	2^{r}
(Russia) E Vesnina	6	5
(Spain) V Ruano Pascual	6	6
(Austria) S Bammer	4	3

Second round
7	(Slovakia) D Hantuchová	7^{7}	6
(United States) L Raymond	6^{2}	2
(United States) A Harkleroad	3	2
WC	(United States) S Williams	6	6
(United States) M Shaughnessy	7^{7}	6
(Russia) E Vesnina	6^{4}	3
(Spain) V Ruano Pascual	6	6
2	(Russia) N Petrova	3	2

Third round
7	(Slovakia) D Hantuchová	6	3	3
WC	(United States) S Williams	1	6	6
(United States) M Shaughnessy	6	6
(Spain) V Ruano Pascual	3	3

Quarterfinals
WC	(United States) S Williams	6^{4}	6	6
(United States) M Shaughnessy	7^{7}	1	4

== See also ==
- 2006 ATP Tour
- WTA Tour
- List of female tennis players
- List of tennis tournaments
