= 2005 JPMorgan Chase Open – Doubles =

Doubles
- 2005 JPMorgan Chase Open

Final
- Champions: (Russia) Elena Dementieva (Italy) Flavia Pennetta
- Runners-up: (United States) Angela Haynes (United States) Bethanie Mattek
- Score: 6–2, 6–4

Details
- Draw: 16
- Seeds: 4

Events
Singles	Doubles
← 2004 ·	WTA Los Angeles	· 2006 →

Nadia Petrova and Meghann Shaughnessy were the defending champions, but had different outcomes. While Shaughnessy did not compete this year due to a back injury, Petrova partnered with Alina Jidkova and lost in first round to Elena Dementieva and Flavia Pennetta.

Dementieva and Pennetta won the title, defeating Angela Haynes and Bethanie Mattek 6–2, 6–4 in the final. It was the 1st and only title of the year, the 5th and final title for Dementieva, and the 1st title of Pennetta, in their respective careers.

== Seeds ==
1. (United States) Lisa Raymond / (Australia) Samantha Stosur (quarterfinals)
2. (Spain) Conchita Martínez / (Spain) Virginia Ruano Pascual (semifinals)
3. (Czech Republic) Iveta Benešová / (Australia) Bryanne Stewart (first round)
4. (Japan) Shinobu Asagoe / (Italy) Tathiana Garbin (quarterfinals)

== Draw ==
=== Key ===
- Q = Qualifier
- WC = Wild card
- LL = Lucky loser
- Alt = Alternate
- SE = Special exempt
- PR = Protected ranking
- ITF = ITF entry
- JE = Junior exempt
- w/o = Walkover
- r = Retired
- d = Defaulted
- SR = Special ranking

=== Draw ===
First round
1	(United States) L Raymond (Australia) S Stosur	7	6
(Poland) M Domachowska (Russia) M Kirilenko	5	0
(China) T Li (China) T Sun	7	6
(Argentina) G Dulko (Russia) D Safina	5	3
4	(Japan) S Asagoe (Italy) T Garbin	6	7^{7}
Q	(Belgium) E Callens (Italy) A Serra Zanetti	3	6^{2}
(United States) J Hopkins (United States) M Washington	3	6^{4}
WC	(United States) A Haynes (United States) B Mattek	6	7^{7}
(Russia) E Dementieva (Italy) F Pennetta	5	6	7^{7}
(Russia) A Jidkova (Russia) N Petrova	7	3	6^{5}
(Chinese Taipei) J Lee (China) S Peng	6	7
3	(Czech Republic) I Benešová (Australia) B Stewart	3	5
(China) Z Yan (China) J Zheng	2	6	6^{4}
(Argentina) ME Salerni (Venezuela) M Vento-Kabchi	6	4	7^{7}
(Greece) E Daniilidou (Russia) S Kuznetsova	2	2
2	(Spain) C Martínez (Spain) V Ruano Pascual	6	6

Quarterfinals
1	(United States) L Raymond (Australia) S Stosur	6	3	2
(China) T Li (China) T Sun	2	6	6
4	(Japan) S Asagoe (Italy) T Garbin	6^{3}	4
WC	(United States) A Haynes (United States) B Mattek	7^{7}	6
(Russia) E Dementieva (Italy) F Pennetta	w/o
(Chinese Taipei) J Lee (China) S Peng
(Argentina) ME Salerni (Venezuela) M Vento-Kabchi	6	3	4
2	(Spain) C Martínez (Spain) V Ruano Pascual	2	6	6

Semifinals
(China) T Li (China) T Sun	3	3
WC	(United States) A Haynes (United States) B Mattek	6	6
(Russia) E Dementieva (Italy) F Pennetta	6	6^{6}	6
2	(Spain) C Martínez (Spain) V Ruano Pascual	4	7^{8}	1

Final
WC	(United States) A Haynes (United States) B Mattek	2	4
(Russia) E Dementieva (Italy) F Pennetta	6	6
