= 2003 JPMorgan Chase Open – Doubles =

Doubles
- 2003 JPMorgan Chase Open

Final
- Champions: (France) Mary Pierce (Australia) Rennae Stubbs
- Runners-up: (Russia) Elena Bovina (Belgium) Els Callens
- Score: 6–3, 6–3

Details
- Draw: 16 (2WC/1Q)
- Seeds: 4

Events
Singles	Doubles
← 2002 ·	LA Women's Tennis Championships	· 2004 →

Kim Clijsters and Jelena Dokic were the defending champions, but both players decided to focus on the singles tournament only.

Wildcards Mary Pierce and Rennae Stubbs won the title by defeating Elena Bovina and Els Callens 6–3, 6–3 in the final.

== Seeds ==
1. (Spain) Virginia Ruano Pascual / (Argentina) Paola Suárez (quarterfinals)
2. (Zimbabwe) Cara Black / (Russia) Elena Likhovtseva (semifinals)
3. (Russia) Svetlana Kuznetsova / (United States) Martina Navratilova (semifinals)
4. (Slovakia) Janette Husárová / (Spain) Conchita Martínez (first round)

== Draw ==
=== Key ===
- Q = Qualifier
- WC = Wild card
- LL = Lucky loser
- Alt = Alternate
- SE = Special exempt
- PR = Protected ranking
- ITF = ITF entry
- JE = Junior exempt
- w/o = Walkover
- r = Retired
- d = Defaulted
- SR = Special ranking

=== Draw ===
First round
1	(Spain) V Ruano Pascual (Argentina) P Suárez	6	6
(France) M Bartoli (France) É Loit	4	3
WC	(France) M Pierce (Australia) R Stubbs	6	6
WC	(United States) A Haynes (South Africa) K Grant	0	4
3	(Russia) S Kuznetsova (United States) M Navratilova	1	7	6
(Slovenia) T Križan (Austria) B Schett	6	5	2
Q	(Australia) N Pratt (Spain) M Serna	2	3
(Russia) N Petrova (Slovenia) K Srebotnik	6	6
(Chinese Taipei) J Lee (United States) M Tu	0	7^{7}	6
(Bulgaria) M Maleeva (Indonesia) A Widjaja	6	6^{4}	3
(Russia) E Bovina (Belgium) E Callens	7	6
4	(Slovakia) J Husárová (Spain) C Martínez	5	4
(Greece) E Daniilidou (United States) C Rubin	2	3
(Russia) E Dementieva (Russia) L Krasnoroutskaya	6	6
(Japan) S Asagoe (Japan) A Sugiyama	6	5	1
2	(Zimbabwe) C Black (Russia) E Likhovtseva	4	7	6

Quarterfinals
1	(Spain) V Ruano Pascual (Argentina) P Suárez	6	6^{4}	3
WC	(France) M Pierce (Australia) R Stubbs	3	7^{7}	6
3	(Russia) S Kuznetsova (United States) M Navratilova	6	6
(Russia) N Petrova (Slovenia) K Srebotnik	2	2
(Chinese Taipei) J Lee (United States) M Tu	5	3
(Russia) E Bovina (Belgium) E Callens	7	6
(Russia) E Dementieva (Russia) L Krasnoroutskaya	4	4
2	(Zimbabwe) C Black (Russia) E Likhovtseva	6	6

Semifinals
WC	(France) M Pierce (Australia) R Stubbs	6	6
3	(Russia) S Kuznetsova (United States) M Navratilova	4	1
(Russia) E Bovina (Belgium) E Callens	3	6	6
2	(Zimbabwe) C Black (Russia) E Likhovtseva	6	4	2

Final
WC	(France) M Pierce (Australia) R Stubbs	6	6
(Russia) E Bovina (Belgium) E Callens	3	3
