= 2006 Acura Classic – Doubles =

Doubles
- 2006 Acura Classic

Final
- Champions: (Zimbabwe) Cara Black (Australia) Rennae Stubbs
- Runners-up: (Germany) Anna-Lena Grönefeld (United States) Meghann Shaughnessy
- Score: 6–2, 6–2

Details
- Draw: 28
- Seeds: 8

Events
Singles	Doubles
← 2005 ·	Acura Classic	· 2007 →

Conchita Martínez and Virginia Ruano Pascual were the defending champions, but Martínez chose not to participate that year.

Ruano Pascual played alongside Paola Suárez, but lost in the quarterfinals to Cara Black and Rennae Stubbs.

Black and Stubbs reached the final where they beat Anna-Lena Grönefeld and Meghann Shaughnessy 6–2, 6–2 to win their title.

== Seeds ==
1. (United States) Lisa Raymond / (Australia) Samantha Stosur (semifinals)
2. (Zimbabwe) Cara Black / (Australia) Rennae Stubbs (champions)
3. (Slovakia) Daniela Hantuchová / (Japan) Ai Sugiyama (quarterfinals)
4. (Germany) Anna-Lena Grönefeld / (United States) Meghann Shaughnessy (final)
5. (Russia) Elena Dementieva / (Italy) Flavia Pennetta (first round)
6. (Spain) Virginia Ruano Pascual / (Argentina) Paola Suárez (quarterfinals)
7. (Russia) Dinara Safina / (Slovenia) Katarina Srebotnik (semifinals)
8. (South Africa) Liezel Huber / (India) Sania Mirza (quarterfinals)

== Draws ==
=== Key ===
- Q = Qualifier
- WC = Wild card
- LL = Lucky loser
- Alt = Alternate
- SE = Special exempt
- PR = Protected ranking
- ITF = ITF entry
- JE = Junior exempt
- w/o = Walkover
- r = Retired
- d = Defaulted
- SR = Special ranking

=== Finals ===
Semifinals
1	(United States) Lisa Raymond (Australia) Samantha Stosur	3	5
4	(Germany) Anna-Lena Grönefeld (United States) Meghann Shaughnessy	6	7
7	(Russia) Dinara Safina (Slovenia) Katarina Srebotnik	6^{2}	3
2	(Zimbabwe) Cara Black (Australia) Rennae Stubbs	7^{7}	6

Final
4	(Germany) Anna-Lena Grönefeld (United States) Meghann Shaughnessy	2	2
2	(Zimbabwe) Cara Black (Australia) Rennae Stubbs	6	6

=== Section 1 ===
First round
(Poland) M Domachowska (France) T Golovin	7	1	1
(France) M Bartoli (Israel) S Pe'er	5	6	6
(Czech Republic) K Peschke (Italy) M Santangelo	6	6
LL	(Austria) S Bammer (Argentina) M Díaz Oliva	4	2
(Serbia and Montenegro) J Janković (United States) B Mattek	6	6
5	(Russia) E Dementieva (Italy) F Pennetta	3	3
(United States) A Harkleroad (United States) V King	6	6
WC	(United States) E Kaufman (United States) L Nelson	2	0
(Russia) A Chakvetadze (United States) J Craybas	6	6
LL	(United States) C Durkin (United States) A Fink	2	2
(Canada) M Drake (Slovenia) T Križan	0	4
8	(South Africa) L Huber (India) S Mirza	6	6

Second round
1	(United States) L Raymond (Australia) S Stosur	6	6
(France) M Bartoli (Israel) S Pe'er	2	2
(Czech Republic) K Peschke (Italy) M Santangelo	6^{7}	3
(Serbia and Montenegro) J Janković (United States) B Mattek	7^{9}	6
4	(Germany) A-L Grönefeld (United States) M Shaughnessy	6	6
(United States) A Harkleroad (United States) V King	0	4
(Russia) A Chakvetadze (United States) J Craybas	5	2
8	(South Africa) L Huber (India) S Mirza	7	6

Quarterfinals
1	(United States) L Raymond (Australia) S Stosur	6	7
(Serbia and Montenegro) J Janković (United States) B Mattek	4	5
4	(Germany) A-L Grönefeld (United States) M Shaughnessy	6	7
8	(South Africa) L Huber (India) S Mirza	2	5

Semifinals
1	(United States) L Raymond (Australia) S Stosur	3	5
4	(Germany) A-L Grönefeld (United States) M Shaughnessy	6	7

=== Section 2 ===
First round
7	(Russia) D Safina (Slovenia) K Srebotnik	6	6
(Argentina) G Dulko (United States) C Morariu	4	3
(Russia) A Rodionova (Romania) A Vanc	7	6
Q	(United States) J Jackson (Japan) A Morigami	5	2
(Ukraine) A Bondarenko (Ukraine) K Bondarenko	1	4
(Serbia and Montenegro) A Ivanovic (Russia) M Kirilenko	6	6
6	(Spain) V Ruano Pascual (Argentina) P Suárez	6	6
(Slovakia) J Husárová (Russia) E Likhovtseva	3	4
(Argentina) P Tarabini (Netherlands) C Vis	2	3
(Russia) A Kudryavtseva (Finland) E Laine	6	6
(United States) A Frazier (United States) L Granville	3	1
(France) N Dechy (Russia) V Zvonareva	6	6

Second round
7	(Russia) D Safina (Slovenia) K Srebotnik	6	6
(Russia) A Rodionova (Romania) A Vanc	2	2
(Serbia and Montenegro) A Ivanovic (Russia) M Kirilenko	7^{8}	1	3
3	(Slovakia) D Hantuchová (Japan) A Sugiyama	6^{6}	6	6
6	(Spain) V Ruano Pascual (Argentina) P Suárez	6	6
(Russia) A Kudryavtseva (Finland) E Laine	1	4
(France) N Dechy (Russia) V Zvonareva
2	(Zimbabwe) C Black (Australia) R Stubbs	w/o

Quarterfinals
7	(Russia) D Safina (Slovenia) K Srebotnik	6	6
3	(Slovakia) D Hantuchová (Japan) A Sugiyama	1	3
6	(Spain) V Ruano Pascual (Argentina) P Suárez	1	2
2	(Zimbabwe) C Black (Australia) R Stubbs	6	6

Semifinals
7	(Russia) D Safina (Slovenia) K Srebotnik	6^{2}	3
2	(Zimbabwe) C Black (Australia) R Stubbs	7^{7}	6
