= 2006 JPMorgan Chase Open – Doubles =

Doubles
- 2006 JPMorgan Chase Open

Final
- Champions: (Spain) Virginia Ruano Pascual (Argentina) Paola Suárez
- Runners-up: (Slovakia) Daniela Hantuchová (Japan) Ai Sugiyama
- Score: 6–3, 6–4

Details
- Draw: 16
- Seeds: 4

Events
Singles	Doubles
← 2005 ·	WTA Los Angeles	· 2007 →

Elena Dementieva and Flavia Pennetta were the defending champions, but lost in second round to Virginia Ruano Pascual and Paola Suárez.

Virginia Ruano Pascual and Paola Suárez won the title, defeating Daniela Hantuchová and Ai Sugiyama 6–3, 6–4 in the final. It was the 35th doubles title for Ruano Pascual and the 40th title for Suárez, in their respective careers. It was also the 1st doubles title of the year for both players.

== Seeds ==
1. (United States) Lisa Raymond / (Australia) Samantha Stosur (first round)
2. (Zimbabwe) Cara Black / (Australia) Rennae Stubbs (quarterfinals)
3. (Slovakia) Daniela Hantuchová / (Japan) Ai Sugiyama (final)
4. (Germany) Anna-Lena Grönefeld / (United States) Meghann Shaughnessy (first round)

== Draw ==
=== Key ===
- Q = Qualifier
- WC = Wild card
- LL = Lucky loser
- Alt = Alternate
- SE = Special exempt
- PR = Protected ranking
- ITF = ITF entry
- JE = Junior exempt
- w/o = Walkover
- r = Retired
- d = Defaulted
- SR = Special ranking

First round
1	(United States) L Raymond (Australia) S Stosur	1	6	3
(United States) C Morariu (Russia) N Petrova	6	3	6
(Russia) V Dushevina (Italy) M Santangelo	7	7^{7}
(China) T Li (China) T Sun	5	6^{5}
3	(Slovakia) D Hantuchová (Japan) A Sugiyama	6	6
(France) M Bartoli (Israel) S Pe'er	4	3
WC	(Serbia and Montenegro) A Ivanovic (Russia) M Kirilenko	7^{7}	6
(South Africa) L Huber (India) S Mirza	6^{2}	2
(Russia) E Dementieva (Italy) F Pennetta	6	6
WC	(United States) J Craybas (United States) A Frazier	3	2
(Spain) V Ruano Pascual (Argentina) P Suárez	1	6	6
4	(Germany) A-L Grönefeld (United States) M Shaughnessy	6	1	3
(Slovakia) J Husárová (Czech Republic) K Peschke	7	6
Q	(Russia) A Chakvetadze (Russia) E Vesnina	5	3
(Russia) A Rodionova (Romania) A Vanc	5	2
2	(Zimbabwe) C Black (Australia) R Stubbs	7	6

Quarterfinals
(United States) C Morariu (Russia) N Petrova	6	6
(Russia) V Dushevina (Italy) M Santangelo	3	3
3	(Slovakia) D Hantuchová (Japan) A Sugiyama	7^{8}	6
WC	(Serbia and Montenegro) A Ivanovic (Russia) M Kirilenko	6^{6}	4
(Russia) E Dementieva (Italy) F Pennetta	4	5
(Spain) V Ruano Pascual (Argentina) P Suárez	6	7
(Slovakia) J Husárová (Czech Republic) K Peschke	6	6
2	(Zimbabwe) C Black (Australia) R Stubbs	4	0

Semifinals
(United States) C Morariu (Russia) N Petrova	6^{3}	3
3	(Slovakia) D Hantuchová (Japan) A Sugiyama	7^{7}	6
(Spain) V Ruano Pascual (Argentina) P Suárez	6	6
(Slovakia) J Husárová (Czech Republic) K Peschke	3	2

Final
3	(Slovakia) D Hantuchová (Japan) A Sugiyama	3	4
(Spain) V Ruano Pascual (Argentina) P Suárez	6	6
