= 2006 Serena Williams tennis season =

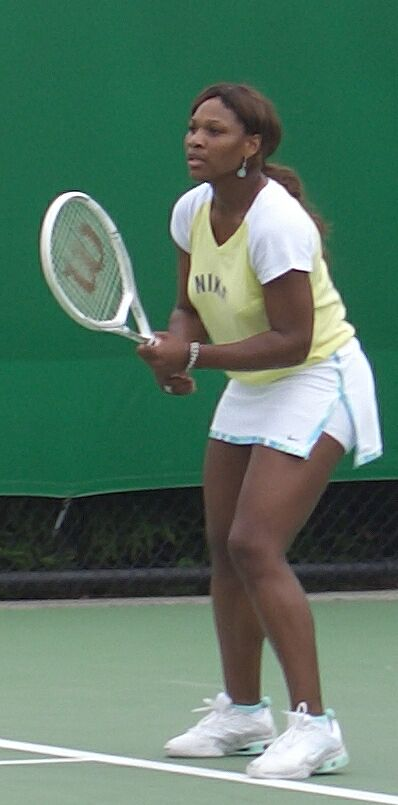
- Serena Williams at the Australian Open
- Full name: Serena Jameka Williams
- Country: United States
- Calendar prize money: $131,705

Singles
- Season record: 12–4 (75%)
- Calendar titles: 0
- Year-end ranking: 95
- Ranking change from previous year: ▼84

Grand Slam & significant results
- Australian Open: 3R
- French Open: A
- Wimbledon: A
- US Open: 4R

Serena Williams' 2006 tennis season was hampered by injury. She was only able to play four tournaments and fell outside the top 100 for the first time since 1997.

== Year summary ==
=== Australian Open ===
"All I could think was that I so didn't want to be there, at just that moment. On the court. In Melbourne. Fighting for points I didn't really care about, in a match I didn't really care about. So what did I do? I cried. Right there on court... It started during one of the changeovers, but it continued when I went back out to play, and it was such a low, despairing, desperate moment for me. I don't know how I managed to keep playing, but I kept playing, because that's just what I did."

— Williams in her biography, talking about her meltdown on court.

Williams did not have any preparation for defending her title at the Australian Open. She faced China's Li Na and won in three sets, dropping the second set in a tiebreak but winning the first and third sets comfortably. In the second round, she defeated Frenchwoman Camille Pin, dropping just four games.

Williams then faced Daniela Hantuchová in the round of 32. She lost the first set, winning only a single game. In the second set, Williams saved three match points in the twelfth game to push it to a tiebreak, but Hantuchová won on her fifth match point. The loss meant that Williams dropped outside of the top 40 for the first time since entering it in 1998.

=== Early hard courts, clay court and grass season ===
She then withdrew from tournaments in Tokyo (citing a lack of fitness), Dubai, and the Tier I NASDAQ-100 Open in Key Biscayne (citing a knee injury and lack of fitness).

On April 10, her ranking fell out of the top 100 for the first time since November 16, 1997. Shortly after, she announced that she would miss both the French Open and Wimbledon due to a chronic knee injury. She stated that, on doctor's orders, she would not be able to compete before "the end of the summer."

=== US Open Series ===
==== Western & Southern Financial Group Women's Open ====
Williams returned to competition ranked No. 139 at the Western & Southern Financial Group Women's Open. In the first round, she faced world No. 11 Anastasia Myskina and won convincingly, dropping only four games.

She then defeated Bethanie Mattek in the next round, once again losing just four games. In the quarterfinals, Williams faced compatriot Amy Frazier and won in similar fashion, marking the third consecutive match in which she dropped only four games.

In the semifinals, she took on Russian Vera Zvonareva but was defeated in straight sets.

==== JPMorgan Chase Open ====
In only her third tournament of the year, Williams competed at the JPMorgan Chase Open. She cruised past her first two opponents, Maria Kirilenko and Ashley Harkleroad, winning both matches in straight sets.

In the third round, she faced Daniela Hantuchová and lost the first set, winning only one game. However, Williams mounted a comeback, winning the next two sets 6–3, 6–3.

In the quarterfinals, Williams faced compatriot Meghann Shaughnessy. The first set went to a tiebreak, which Shaughnessy won, but Williams responded by dominating the next two sets to secure the victory.

Williams then faced Jelena Janković in the semifinals. Janković broke Williams in the tenth game of the first set to claim it. She then took control of the second set by breaking Williams in the fourth game, paving the way for her to advance to the final.

==== US Open ====
Williams was unable to enter the US Open as a direct entry but received a wildcard.

Williams began her US Open campaign against Spaniard Lourdes Domínguez Lino and quickly dispatched the world No. 41 in straight sets.

For the third time in four tournaments, Williams faced Daniela Hantuchová. Hantuchová served for the first set in the ninth game, but Williams broke back and won the next three games to take the set. She then secured the second set to advance.

In the third round, Williams faced rising star Ana Ivanovic and cruised to a straight-set victory, becoming the first wildcard entry to reach the round of 16.

In the fourth round, Williams faced top seed Amélie Mauresmo. Mauresmo took the first set with a single break. However, Williams responded by dominating the second set, winning it 6–0. In the final set, Mauresmo broke Williams in the fifth game and won the last three games to secure the victory and advance to the quarterfinals.

== All matches ==
=== Singles matches ===
Tournament	Match	Round	Opponent	Rank	Result	Score
Australian Open; Melbourne, Australia; Grand Slam; Hard, outdoor 16–29 January 2006	372	1R	(China) Li Na	#52	Win	6–3, 6–7^{(5–7)}, 6–2
Australian Open; Melbourne, Australia; Grand Slam; Hard, outdoor 16–29 January 2006	373	2R	(France) Camille Pin	#130	Win	6–3, 6–1
Australian Open; Melbourne, Australia; Grand Slam; Hard, outdoor 16–29 January 2006	374	3R	(Slovakia) Daniela Hantuchová	#17	Loss	1–6, 6–7^{(5–7)}
Western & Southern Financial Group Women's Open; Cincinnati, United States; WTA Tier III; Hard; 17–23 July 2006	375	1R	(Russia) Anastasia Myskina	#11	Win	6–2, 6–2
Western & Southern Financial Group Women's Open; Cincinnati, United States; WTA Tier III; Hard; 17–23 July 2006	376	2R	(United States) Bethanie Mattek-Sands	#105	Win	6–3, 6–1
Western & Southern Financial Group Women's Open; Cincinnati, United States; WTA Tier III; Hard; 17–23 July 2006	377	QF	(United States) Amy Frazier	#56	Win	6–2, 6–2
Western & Southern Financial Group Women's Open; Cincinnati, United States; WTA Tier III; Hard; 17–23 July 2006	378	SF	(Russia) Vera Zvonareva	50	Loss	2–6, 3–6
JPMorgan Chase Open; Los Angeles, United States; WTA Tier II; Hard; 7–13 August 2006	379	1R	(Russia) Maria Kirilenko	#21	Win	6–2, 6–1
JPMorgan Chase Open; Los Angeles, United States; WTA Tier II; Hard; 7–13 August 2006	380	2R	(United States) Ashley Harkleroad	#102	Win	6–3, 6–2
JPMorgan Chase Open; Los Angeles, United States; WTA Tier II; Hard; 7–13 August 2006	381	3R	(Slovakia) Daniela Hantuchová	#17	Win	1–6, 6–3, 6–3
JPMorgan Chase Open; Los Angeles, United States; WTA Tier II; Hard; 7–13 August 2006	382	QF	(United States) Meghann Shaughnessy	#77	Win	6–7^{(7–9)}, 6–1, 6–4
JPMorgan Chase Open; Los Angeles, United States; WTA Tier II; Hard; 7–13 August 2006	383	SF	(Serbia) Jelena Janković	#28	Loss	4–6, 3–6
US Open; New York City, United States; Grand Slam; Hard, outdoor 28 August – 10 September 2006	384	1R	(Spain) Lourdes Domínguez Lino	#41	Win	6–1, 6–2
US Open; New York City, United States; Grand Slam; Hard, outdoor 28 August – 10 September 2006	385	2R	(Slovakia) Daniela Hantuchová	#18	Win	7–5, 6–3
US Open; New York City, United States; Grand Slam; Hard, outdoor 28 August – 10 September 2006	386	3R	(Serbia) Ana Ivanovic	#17	Win	6–2, 6–4
US Open; New York City, United States; Grand Slam; Hard, outdoor 28 August – 10 September 2006	387	4R	(France) Amélie Mauresmo	#1	Loss	4–6, 6–0, 2–6

== Tournament schedule ==
=== Singles schedule ===
Williams' 2006 singles tournament schedule is as follows:

Date	Championship	Location	Category	Surface	Points	Outcome
16 January 2006 – 29 January 2006	Australian Open	Melbourne (AUS)	Grand Slam	Hard	62	Third Round lost to Daniela Hantuchová 1–6, 6–7(5–7)
17 July 2006 – 23 July 2006	Western & Southern Financial Group Women's Open	Cincinnati (USA)	WTA Tier III	Hard	55	Semifinals lost to Vera Zvonareva 2–6, 3–6
7 August 2006 – 13 August 2006	JPMorgan Chase Open	Los Angeles (USA)	WTA Tier II	Hard	88	Semifinals lost to Jelena Janković, 4–6, 3–6
28 August 2006 – 10 September 2006	US Open	New York (USA)	Grand Slam	Hard	96	Fourth Round lost to Amélie Mauresmo, 6–4, 0–6, 6–2
Total year-end points					301	

== Yearly records ==
=== Head–to–head matchups ===
Ordered by percentage of wins

- (China) Li Na 1–0
- (France) Camille Pin 1–0
- (Russia) Anastasia Myskina 1–0
- (United States) Bethanie Mattek-Sands 1–0
- (United States) Amy Frazier 1–0
- (Russia) Maria Kirilenko 1–0
- (United States) Ashley Harkleroad 1–0
- (United States) Meghann Shaughnessy 1–0
- (Spain) Lourdes Domínguez Lino 1–0
- (Serbia) Ana Ivanovic 1–0
- (Slovakia) Daniela Hantuchová 2–1
- (Russia) Vera Zvonareva 0–1
- (Serbia) Jelena Janković 0–1
- (France) Amélie Mauresmo 0–1

=== Earnings ===
#	Event	Prize money	Year-to-date
1	Australian Open	$32,483	$32,483
2	Western & Southern Financial Group Women's Open	$7,700	$40,183
3	JPMorgan Chase Open	$25,060	$65,243
4	US Open	$66,462	$131,705
			$131,705

Figures in United States dollars (USD) unless noted.

== See also ==
- Venus Williams
- 2006 WTA Tour

Sporting positions
Preceded by Venus Williams; Angelique Kerber	World No. 1 First stint: July 8, 2002 – August 10, 2003; Last stint: April 24, 2017 – May 14, 2017	Succeeded by Kim Clijsters; Angelique Kerber
Preceded by Jennifer Capriati; Justine Henin; Petra Kvitová	Year-end World No. 1; 2002; 2008, 2009; 2012 – 2015	Succeeded by Justine Henin; Kim Clijsters; Angelique Kerber
Awards
Preceded by Jennifer Capriati; Jelena Janković; Petra Kvitová	ITF Women's Singles World Champion; 2002; 2009; 2012 – 2015	Succeeded by Justine Henin; Caroline Wozniacki; Angelique Kerber
Preceded by Martina Hingis & Anna Kournikova; Cara Black & Liezel Huber	WTA Doubles Team of the Year; 2000 (with Venus Williams); 2009 (with Venus Williams)	Succeeded by Lisa Raymond & Rennae Stubbs; Gisela Dulko & Flavia Pennetta
Preceded by Cara Black & Liezel Huber	ITF Women's Doubles World Champion; 2009 (with Venus Williams)	Succeeded by Gisela Dulko & Flavia Pennetta
