= 2006 Acura Classic – Singles =

Singles
- 2006 Acura Classic

Final
- Champion: (Russia) Maria Sharapova
- Runner-up: (Belgium) Kim Clijsters
- Score: 7–5, 7–5

Details
- Draw: 56
- Seeds: 16

Events
Singles	Doubles
- Acura Classic

Maria Sharapova defeated Kim Clijsters in the final, 7–5, 7–5 to win the singles tennis title at the 2006 Southern California Open.

Mary Pierce was the defending champion, but lost in the quarterfinals to Sharapova.

== Seeds ==
The top eight seeds received a bye into the second round.

1. (Belgium) Kim Clijsters (final)
2. (Russia) Maria Sharapova (champion)
3. (Russia) Nadia Petrova (second round)
4. (Russia) Elena Dementieva (quarterfinals)
5. (Switzerland) Patty Schnyder (semifinals)
6. (France) Mary Pierce (quarterfinals)
7. (Czech Republic) Nicole Vaidišová (semifinals)
8. (Switzerland) Martina Hingis (quarterfinals)
9. (Russia) Dinara Safina (first round)
10. (Germany) Anna-Lena Grönefeld (first round)
11. (Slovakia) Daniela Hantuchová (third round)
12. (Italy) Flavia Pennetta (third round)
13. (Japan) Ai Sugiyama (first round)
14. (Serbia and Montenegro) Ana Ivanovic (third round)
15. (Slovenia) Katarina Srebotnik (second round)
16. (Russia) Maria Kirilenko (first round)

== Draw ==
Key

- Q = Qualifier
- WC = Wild card
- LL = Lucky loser
- Alt = Alternate
- ITF = ITF entry
- PR = Protected ranking
- SR = Special ranking
- SE = Special exempt
- JE = Junior exempt
- JR = Junior Accelerator Programme entrant
- CO = College Accelerator Programme entrant
- NG = Next Gen Accelerator Program entrant
- w/o = Walkover
- r = Retired
- d = Defaulted

=== Finals ===
Quarterfinals
1	(Belgium) Kim Clijsters	7	6
8	(Switzerland) Martina Hingis	5	2
(Russia) Anna Chakvetadze	6	4	3
7	(Czech Republic) Nicole Vaidišová	3	6	6
5	(Switzerland) Patty Schnyder	6	6
4	(Russia) Elena Dementieva	4	3
6	(France) Mary Pierce	2	3
2	(Russia) Maria Sharapova	6	6

Semifinals
1	(Belgium) Kim Clijsters	6	7^{7}
7	(Czech Republic) Nicole Vaidišová	2	6^{0}
5	(Switzerland) Patty Schnyder	5	4
2	(Russia) Maria Sharapova	7	6

Final
1	(Belgium) Kim Clijsters	5	5
2	(Russia) Maria Sharapova	7	7

=== Top half ===
==== Section 1 ====
First round
(France) N Dechy	5	4
(Australia) S Stosur	7	6
LL	(Croatia) I Lisjak	2	6^{2}
(Ukraine) A Bondarenko	6	7^{7}
(Serbia and Montenegro) J Janković	6	6
16	(Russia) M Kirilenko	1	4
12	(Italy) F Pennetta	7	6
WC	(United States) L Raymond	5	3
(United States) J Jackson	4	6	6
(Argentina) M Díaz Oliva	6	2	4
(United States) L Granville	4	6	2
Q	(United States) M Tu	6	1	6

Second round
1	(Belgium) K Clijsters	6	6
(Australia) S Stosur	1	2
(Ukraine) A Bondarenko	1	6^{4}
(Serbia and Montenegro) J Janković	6	7^{7}
12	(Italy) F Pennetta	6	7^{7}
(United States) J Jackson	2	6^{1}
Q	(United States) M Tu	2	3
8	(Switzerland) M Hingis	6	6

Third round
1	(Belgium) K Clijsters	6	3	6
(Serbia and Montenegro) J Janković	4	6	3
12	(Italy) F Pennetta	2	6	1
8	(Switzerland) M Hingis	6	3	6

Quarterfinals
1	(Belgium) K Clijsters	7	6
8	(Switzerland) M Hingis	5	2

==== Section 2 ====
First round
(Russia) A Chakvetadze	6	6
(Croatia) J Kostanić	4	3
(France) T Golovin	3	6^{7}
Q	(United States) A Frazier	6	7^{9}
(Japan) A Morigami	2	1
14	(Serbia and Montenegro) A Ivanovic	6	6
11	(Slovakia) D Hantuchová	6	4
(Czech Republic) K Peschke	1	0	r
Q	(Ukraine) O Savchuk	2
Q	(Czech Republic) H Šromová	2	r
(Russia) E Likhovtseva	4	3
Q	(Spain) V Ruano Pascual	6	6

Second round
3	(Russia) N Petrova	3	7^{7}	2
(Russia) A Chakvetadze	6	6^{5}	6
Q	(United States) A Frazier	3	2
14	(Serbia and Montenegro) A Ivanovic	6	6
11	(Slovakia) D Hantuchová	6	6
Q	(Ukraine) O Savchuk	2	4
Q	(Spain) V Ruano Pascual	1	0
7	(Czech Republic) N Vaidišová	6	6

Third round
(Russia) A Chakvetadze	4	6	6
14	(Serbia and Montenegro) A Ivanovic	6	4	1
11	(Slovakia) D Hantuchová	4	2
7	(Czech Republic) N Vaidišová	6	6

Quarterfinals
(Russia) A Chakvetadze	6	4	3
7	(Czech Republic) N Vaidišová	3	6	6

=== Bottom half ===
==== Section 3 ====
First round
(Argentina) G Dulko	2	6	6
(Israel) S Pe'er	6	3	3
Q	(Ukraine) K Bondarenko	6	6
WC	(United States) C Vandeweghe	4	2
(Argentina) P Suárez	3	6	6
9	(Russia) D Safina	6	3	4
15	(Slovenia) K Srebotnik	6	6
(France) M Bartoli	3	0
WC	(India) S Mirza	6	6
(United States) M Shaughnessy	3	1
(United States) J Craybas	2	3
WC	(United States) A Harkleroad	6	6

Second round
5	(Switzerland) P Schnyder	6	6
(Argentina) G Dulko	4	1
Q	(Ukraine) K Bondarenko	6^{4}	2
(Argentina) P Suárez	7^{7}	6
15	(Slovenia) K Srebotnik	3	6^{4}
WC	(India) S Mirza	6	7^{7}
WC	(United States) A Harkleroad	2	2
4	(Russia) E Dementieva	6	6

Third round
5	(Switzerland) P Schnyder	6	3	6
(Argentina) P Suárez	3	6	1
WC	(India) S Mirza	2	6	3
4	(Russia) E Dementieva	6	3	6

Quarterfinals
5	(Switzerland) P Schnyder	6	6
4	(Russia) E Dementieva	4	3

==== Section 4 ====
First round
(Austria) S Bammer	6	6^{6}	6
(Czech Republic) L Šafářová	4	7^{8}	1
Q	(United States) V King	4	2
(Finland) E Laine	6	6
(Russia) E Vesnina	3	6	6
10	(Germany) A-L Grönefeld	6	3	3
13	(Japan) A Sugiyama	1	5
(Russia) V Zvonareva	6	7
(China) S Peng	6	6
(Italy) M Santangelo	1	4
Q	(Russia) V Bardina	6	6
LL	(China) M Yuan	2	4

Second round
6	(France) M Pierce	6	6^{7}	7^{7}
(Austria) S Bammer	1	7^{9}	6^{4}
(Finland) E Laine	6^{1}	7^{7}	6
(Russia) E Vesnina	7^{7}	6^{5}	4
(Russia) V Zvonareva	3	7^{7}	0
(China) S Peng	6	6^{5}	0^{r}
Q	(Russia) V Bardina	4	1
2	(Russia) M Sharapova	6	6

Third round
6	(France) M Pierce	6	6
(Finland) E Laine	2	1
(Russia) V Zvonareva	4	4
2	(Russia) M Sharapova	6	6

Quarterfinals
6	(France) M Pierce	2	3
2	(Russia) M Sharapova	6	6
