= 2004 JPMorgan Chase Open – Singles =

Singles
- 2004 JPMorgan Chase Open

Final
- Champion: (United States) Lindsay Davenport
- Runner-up: (United States) Serena Williams
- Score: 6–1, 6–3

Details
- Draw: 56
- Seeds: 16

Events
Singles	Doubles
- WTA Los Angeles

Kim Clijsters was the defending champion, but did not compete this year due to a recovery from a cyst surgery.

Lindsay Davenport won the tournament, defeating Serena Williams 6–1, 6–3 in the final.

== Seeds ==
The first eight seeds received a bye into the second round.

1. (United States) Serena Williams (final)
2. (United States) Venus Williams (semifinal, retired due to a right wrist sprain)
3. (United States) Lindsay Davenport (champion)
4. (Russia) Elena Dementieva (semifinal)
5. (Russia) Svetlana Kuznetsova (quarterfinals)
6. (Japan) Ai Sugiyama (third round)
7. (Russia) Nadia Petrova (quarterfinals)
8. (Russia) Vera Zvonareva (quarterfinals)
9. (Switzerland) Patty Schnyder (second round)
10. (Israel) Anna Smashnova-Pistolesi (third round)
11. (Italy) Francesca Schiavone (quarterfinals)
12. (Italy) Silvia Farina Elia (first round)
13. (Colombia) Fabiola Zuluaga (first round)
14. (United States) Chanda Rubin (third round)
15. (United States) Amy Frazier (third round)
16. (United States) Meghann Shaughnessy (first round)

== Draw ==
Key

- Q = Qualifier
- WC = Wild card
- LL = Lucky loser
- Alt = Alternate
- ITF = ITF entry
- PR = Protected ranking
- SR = Special ranking
- SE = Special exempt
- JE = Junior exempt
- JR = Junior Accelerator Programme entrant
- CO = College Accelerator Programme entrant
- NG = Next Gen Accelerator Program entrant
- w/o = Walkover
- r = Retired
- d = Defaulted

=== Finals ===
Quarterfinals
1/PR	(United States) Serena Williams	4	6	6
8	(Russia) Vera Zvonareva	6	3	3
4	(Russia) Elena Dementieva	5	6	6
5	(Russia) Svetlana Kuznetsova	7	2	2
7	(Russia) Nadia Petrova	1	1
3	(United States) Lindsay Davenport	6	6
11	(Italy) Francesca Schiavone	5	1
2/PR	(United States) Venus Williams	7	6

Semifinals
1/PR	(United States) Serena Williams	6	7^{7}
4	(Russia) Elena Dementieva	3	6^{2}
3	(United States) Lindsay Davenport	7	2
2/PR	(United States) Venus Williams	5	0^{r}

Final
1/PR	(United States) Serena Williams	1	3
3	(United States) Lindsay Davenport	6	6

=== Top half ===
==== Section 1 ====
First round
(Greece) E Daniilidou	4	6	6
WC	(United States) T Ashley	6	1	3
(United States) J Craybas	6^{7}	6^{3}
(Spain) A Parra Santonja	7^{9}	7^{7}
(Germany) A Barna	6	6
13	(Colombia) F Zuluaga	1	1
12	(Italy) S Farina Elia	2	4
(Japan) A Morigami	6	6
(Thailand) T Tanasugarn	6	4	4
(France) M Bartoli	2	6	6
(Slovenia) T Pisnik	4	6	6
(Czech Republic) B Strýcová	6	4	2

Second round
1/PR	(United States) S Williams	6	7^{7}
(Greece) E Daniilidou	1	6^{3}
(Spain) A Parra Santonja	6	7^{7}
(Germany) A Barna	0	6^{2}
(Japan) A Morigami	2	2
(France) M Bartoli	6	6
(Slovenia) T Pisnik
8	(Russia) V Zvonareva	w/o

Third round
1/PR	(United States) S Williams	6	6
(Spain) A Parra Santonja	0	3
(France) M Bartoli	2	3
8	(Russia) V Zvonareva	6	6

Quarterfinals
1/PR	(United States) S Williams	4	6	6
8	(Russia) V Zvonareva	6	3	3

==== Section 2 ====
First round
(Japan) S Obata	5	5
Q	(United States) L Osterloh	7	7
Q	(United States) A Spears	3	4
(Czech Republic) I Benešová	6	6
Q	(United States) M Irvin	2	6	6^{5}
14	(United States) C Rubin	6	1	7^{7}
10	(Israel) A Smashnova-Pistolesi	6	6
(Spain) V Ruano Pascual	2	1
(Slovakia) D Hantuchová	6	6
(Zimbabwe) C Black	2	4
(Argentina) G Dulko	2	2
(Venezuela) M Vento-Kabchi	6	6

Second round
4	(Russia) E Dementieva	6	6
Q	(United States) L Osterloh	4	2
(Czech Republic) I Benešová	6	1	2
14	(United States) C Rubin	4	6	6
10	(Israel) A Smashnova-Pistolesi	7^{7}	6
(Slovakia) D Hantuchová	6^{5}	4
(Venezuela) M Vento-Kabchi	3	3
5	(Russia) S Kuznetsova	6	6

Third round
4	(Russia) E Dementieva	7	7^{10}
14	(United States) C Rubin	5	6^{8}
10	(Israel) A Smashnova-Pistolesi	3	0
5	(Russia) S Kuznetsova	6	6

Quarterfinals
4	(Russia) E Dementieva	5	6	6
5	(Russia) S Kuznetsova	7	2	2

=== Bottom half ===
==== Section 3 ====
First round
WC	(United States) J Kirkland	6	6
(Italy) T Garbin	1	3
(Croatia) J Kostanić	7^{7}	2	6
(Slovakia) M Suchá	6^{5}	6	2
(United States) L Lee-Waters	1	7	4
9	(Switzerland) P Schnyder	6	5	6
15	(United States) A Frazier	6	6
(Russia) A Jidkova	2	2
(Austria) B Schett	6	6
(Luxembourg) C Schaul	3	4
LL	(Luxembourg) A Kremer	6	5	6
(United States) L Granville	3	7	0

Second round
7	(Russia) N Petrova	6	6
WC	(United States) J Kirkland	2	3
(Croatia) J Kostanić	6	7^{7}
9	(Switzerland) P Schnyder	1	6^{5}
15	(United States) A Frazier	6	6
(Austria) B Schett	4	4
LL	(Luxembourg) A Kremer	5	2
3	(United States) L Davenport	7	6

Third round
7	(Russia) N Petrova	6	6
(Croatia) J Kostanić	3	2
15	(United States) A Frazier	2	4
3	(United States) L Davenport	6	6

Quarterfinals
7	(Russia) N Petrova	1	1
3	(United States) L Davenport	6	6

==== Section 4 ====
First round
(Australia) N Pratt	0	7^{7}	6
(Hungary) P Mandula	6	6^{3}	4
(Spain) C Martínez	4	4
(France) N Dechy	6	6
(United States) S Perry	0	3
11	(Italy) F Schiavone	6	6
16	(United States) M Shaughnessy	6^{2}	6	5
(Serbia and Montenegro) J Janković	7^{7}	2	7
Q	(Puerto Rico) V Castellvi	3	2
(Russia) E Likhovtseva	6	6
WC	(United States) A Harkleroad	6	6
(Japan) S Asagoe	3	2

Second round
6	(Japan) A Sugiyama	6	6
(Australia) N Pratt	2	4
(France) N Dechy	6^{5}	2
11	(Italy) F Schiavone	7^{7}	6
(Serbia and Montenegro) J Janković	6	3	5
(Russia) E Likhovtseva	2	6	7
WC	(United States) A Harkleroad	2	1
2/PR	(United States) V Williams	6	6

Third round
6	(Japan) A Sugiyama	3	6	6^{3}
11	(Italy) F Schiavone	6	0	7^{7}
(Russia) E Likhovtseva	1	1
2/PR	(United States) V Williams	6	6

Quarterfinals
11	(Italy) F Schiavone	5	1
2/PR	(United States) V Williams	7	6
