= 2006 Acura Classic =

- Date: July 29 – August 6
- Edition: 28th
- Category: Tier I
- Draw: 56S / 28D
- Prize money: USD 1,340,000
- Surface: Hard / outdoor
- Location: San Diego, California, U.S.
- Venue: La Costa Resort and Spa

Champions

Singles
- (Russia) Maria Sharapova

Doubles
- (Zimbabwe) Cara Black / (Australia) Rennae Stubbs
- Southern California Open

The 2006 Acura Classic was a women's tennis tournament played on outdoor hard courts at the La Costa Resort and Spa in San Diego, California, United States, which was part of Tier I of the 2006 WTA Tour. It was the 28th edition of the tournament and was held from July 29 through August 6, 2006. Second-seeded Maria Sharapova won the singles title and earned $196,900 first-prize money as well as 300 ranking points.

== Finals ==
=== Singles ===
(Russia) Maria Sharapova defeated (Belgium) Kim Clijsters, 7–5, 7–5

- It was Sharapova's 2nd title of the year and the 12th of her career.

=== Doubles ===
(Zimbabwe) Cara Black / (Australia) Rennae Stubbs defeated (Germany) Anna-Lena Grönefeld / (United States) Meghann Shaughnessy, 6–2, 6–2

- It was Black's 1st title of the year and the 36th of her career. It was Stubbs' 2nd title of the year and the 54th of her career.
