= 2003 JPMorgan Chase Open =

Women's tennis tournament

- Date: August 4–10
- Edition: 30th
- Category: Tier II
- Draw: 48S / 16D
- Prize money: $635,000
- Surface: Hard / outdoor
- Location: Carson, California, U.S.

Champions

Singles
- (Belgium) Kim Clijsters

Doubles
- (France) Mary Pierce / (Australia) Rennae Stubbs
- WTA Los Angeles

The 2003 JPMorgan Chase Open was a women's tennis tournament played on outdoor hard courts that was part of the Tier II Series of the 2004 WTA Tour. It was the 30th edition of the tournament and took place in Carson, California, United States, from August 4 through August 10, 2003. First-seeded Kim Clijsters won the singles title and earned $97,000 first-prize money. As a result of her win Clijsters became the world No. 1 ranked player for the first time in her career and the first female player to do so without winning a Grand Slam tournament.

== Finals ==
=== Singles ===
(Belgium) Kim Clijsters defeated (United States) Lindsay Davenport, 6–1, 3–6, 6–3

- It was Clijsters' 6th singles title of the year and the 16th of her career.

=== Doubles ===
(France) Mary Pierce / (Australia) Rennae Stubbs defeated (Russia) Elena Bovina / (Belgium) Els Callens, 6–3, 6–3
