= 2006 JPMorgan Chase Open =

- Date: August 7–13
- Edition: 33rd
- Category: Tier II
- Draw: 56S / 16D
- Prize money: $600,000
- Surface: Hard / outdoor
- Location: Carson, California, U.S.

Champions

Singles
- (Russia) Elena Dementieva

Doubles
- (Spain) Virginia Ruano / (Argentina) Paola Suárez
- WTA Los Angeles

The 2006 JPMorgan Chase Open was a women's tennis tournament played on outdoor hard courts that was part of the Tier II Series of the 2006 WTA Tour. It was the 33rd edition of the tournament and took place in Carson, California, United States, from August 7 through August 13, 2006. Elena Dementieva won the singles title. Third-seeded Elena Dementieva won the singles title and earned $95,500 first-prize money.

== Finals ==
=== Singles ===
(Russia) Elena Dementieva defeated (Serbia) Jelena Janković, 6–3, 4–6, 6–4

- It was Dementieva's 2nd singles title of the year and the 6th of her career.

=== Doubles ===
(Spain) Virginia Ruano Pascual / (Argentina) Paola Suárez defeated (Slovakia) Daniela Hantuchová / (Japan) Ai Sugiyama, 6–3, 6–4
