= Angela Haynes =

American tennis player

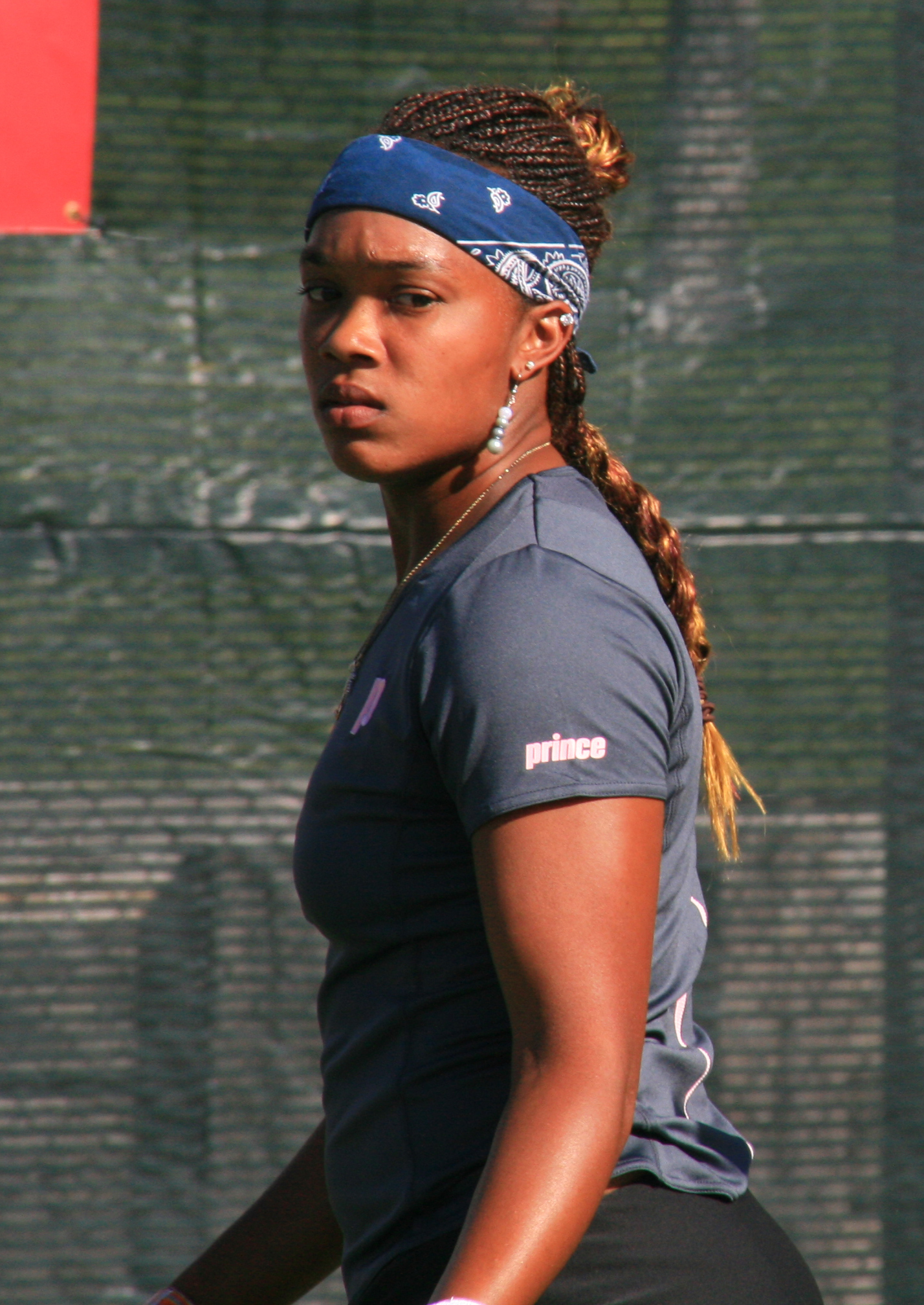
- Country (sports): United States
- Born: September 27, 1984 (age 41) Bellflower, California, U.S.
- Height: 5 ft 8 in (1.73 m)
- Turned pro: 2002
- Retired: 2014
- Plays: Left (two-handed backhand)
- Prize money: $492,425

Singles
- Career record: 223–201
- Career titles: 2 ITF
- Highest ranking: No. 95 (August 22, 2005)

Grand Slam singles results
- Australian Open: 1R (2005)
- French Open: 1R (2005)
- Wimbledon: 1R (2005)
- US Open: 3R (2004)

Doubles
- Career record: 135–129
- Career titles: 8 ITF
- Highest ranking: No. 86 (September 15, 2008)

Grand Slam doubles results
- Wimbledon: 2R (2008)
- US Open: 1R (2003, 2005, 2006, 2007, 2008, 2009)

Angela Haynes (born September 27, 1984) is a former professional tennis player from the United States. Her top singles ranking by the WTA is world No. 95 which she attained in August 2005.

Her brother Dontia Haynes, a former San Diego State University tennis player, ranked among the top 100 ranked collegiate tennis players in the United States, died 23 September 2005.

== Tennis career ==
In 2004, as a wildcard entry, she reached the third round at 2004 US Open, where Francesca Schiavone beat her in two sets. In 2005 first doubles final, partnering Bethanie Mattek-Sands at the JPMorgan Chase Open, they lost against Elena Dementieva and Flavia Pennetta 2–6, 4–6. In 2008 in Memphis, Haynes and Mashona Washington were beaten by Lindsay Davenport and Lisa Raymond, 6–3, 6–1.

Due to some injuries Angela Haynes retired from professional tennis in 2014.

== Clothing ==
Angela's clothing is provided by Adidas. Her racquets are provided by Babolat. Angela's current racquet is believed to be the Babolat Pure Storm. Angela likes to wear bandanas while playing.

== Appearances ==
Angela appears in the 2006 video game Top Spin 2 which is available on the Xbox 360, Game Boy Advance and Nintendo DS.

== WTA career finals ==
=== Doubles (0–2) ===
Legend
Tier I
Tier II (0–1)
Tier III (0–1)
Tier IV & V

Result	No.	Date	Tournament	Surface	Partner	Opponent	Score
Loss	1.	Aug 2005	Los Angeles, US	Hard	(United States) Bethanie Mattek-Sands	(Russia) Elena Dementieva (Italy) Flavia Pennetta	2–6, 4–6
Loss	2.	Febr 2008	Memphis, US	Hard	(United States) Mashona Washington	(United States) Lindsay Davenport (United States) Lisa Raymond	3–6, 1–6

== ITF Circuit finals ==
=== Singles: 8 (2–6) ===
Legend
$100,000 tournaments
$75,000 tournaments
$50,000 tournaments
$25,000 tournaments
$10,000 tournaments

Result	No.	Date	Tournament	Surface	Opponent	Score
Loss	1.	19 May 2003	El Paso, United States	Hard	(United States) Milangela Morales	6–3, 6–7^{(3–7)}, 6–7^{(4–7)}
Win	1.	26 May 2003	Houston, United States	Hard	(United States) Alyssa Cohen	7–6^{(10–8)}, 4–6, 6–1
Loss	2.	22 June 2003	Dallas, United States	Hard	(United States) Jamea Jackson	7–6^{(7–5)},6–3
Loss	3.	18 May 2004	El Paso, United States	Hard	(Australia) Cindy Watson	3–6, 6–7^{(3–7)}
Win	2.	4 June 2007	Hilton Head, United States	Hard	(South Africa) Chanelle Scheepers	3–6, 6–2, 6–4
Loss	4.	11 June 2007	Allentown, United States	Hard	(South Africa) Chanelle Scheepers	3–6, 6–2, 1–6
Loss	5.	15 October 2007	Lawrenceville, United States	Hard	(United States) Julie Ditty	6–7^{(6–8)}, 4–6
Loss	6.	20 January 2008	Surprise, United States	Hard	(Kazakhstan) Sesil Karatantcheva	2–6, 6–4, 4–6

=== Doubles: 20 (8–12) ===
Result	No.	Date	Tournament	Surface	Partner	Opponents	Score
Loss	1.	29 June 2003	Edmond, United States	Hard	(United States) Jacqueline Trail	(United States) Julie Ditty (United States) Kelly McCain	3–6, 3–6
Loss	2.	25 May 2004	Houston, United States	Hard	(United States) Ahsha Rolle	(Brazil) Bruna Colósio (Republic of Ireland) Anne Mall	6–7^{(5–7)}, 4–6
Win	1.	8 June 2004	Allentown, United States	Hard	(United States) Diana Ospina	(United States) Cory Ann Avants (United States) Varvara Lepchenko	6–0, 6–2
Loss	3.	11 October 2005	San Francisco, United States	Hard	(Italy) Francesca Lubiani	(United States) Ansley Cargill (United States) Tara Snyder	6–7^{(2–7)}, 5–7
Loss	4.	18 October 2005	Houston, United States	Hard	(United States) Bethanie Mattek-Sands	(United States) Christina Fusano (United States) Raquel Kops-Jones	4–6, 3–6
Win	2.	16 May 2006	Palm Beach Gardens, United States	Clay	(United States) Raquel Kops-Jones	(United States) Ansley Cargill (Canada) Marie-Ève Pelletier	6–3, 6–3
Win	3.	13 May 2007	Indian Harbour Beach, United States	Clay	(Australia) Monique Adamczak	(United States) Carly Gullickson (United States) Lilia Osterloh	6–1, 3–6, 6–4
Loss	5.	28 May 2007	Carson, United States	Hard	(United States) Lindsay Lee-Waters	(South Africa) Kim Grant (United States) Sunitha Rao	4–6, 4–6
Loss	6.	11 June 2007	Allentown, United States	Hard	(United States) Lindsay Lee-Waters	(Japan) Ryōko Fuda (United States) Sunitha Rao	7–6^{(7–3)}, 4–6, 1–6
Win	4.	17 September 2007	Albuquerque, United States	Hard	(Hungary) Melinda Czink	(Latvia) Līga Dekmeijere (United States) Varvara Lepchenko	7–5, 6–4
Win	5.	1 October 2007	Troy, Alabama, United States	Hard	(United States) Mashona Washington	(Czech Republic) Eva Hrdinová (Canada) Marie-Ève Pelletier	6–4, 6–2
Win	6.	1 October 2007	San Francisco, United States	Hard	(United States) Raquel Kops-Jones	(Argentina) Jorgelina Cravero (Argentina) Betina Jozami	3–6, 6–4, [10–7]
Loss	7.	12 November 2007	La Quinta, United States	Hard	(United States) Mashona Washington	(United States) Christina Fusano (United States) Ashley Harkleroad	2–6, 2–6
Loss	8.	21 January 2008	Waikoloa, United States	Hard	(United States) Mashona Washington	(Brazil) Maria Fernanda Alves (Argentina) Betina Jozami	5–7, 4–6
Win	7.	17 March 2008	Redding, United States	Hard	(United States) Abigail Spears	(Chinese Taipei) Chan Chin-wei (United States) Tetiana Luzhanska	6–4, 6–3
Loss	9.	11 August 2008	Bronx, United States	Hard	(United States) Ahsha Rolle	(United States) Raquel Kops-Jones (United States) Abigail Spears	4–6, 3–6
Loss	10.	22 September 2008	Troy, United States	Hard	(United States) Sunitha Rao	(United States) Raquel Kops-Jones (United States) Abigail Spears	2–6, 0–6
Loss	11.	10 November 2008	San Diego, United States	Hard	(United States) Mashona Washington	(United States) Christina Fusano (United States) Alexa Glatch	3–6, 3–6
Loss	12.	27 April 2009	Charlottesville, United States	Hard	(Russia) Alina Jidkova	(United States) Carly Gullickson (Australia) Nicole Kriz	5–7, 6–3, [7–10]
Win	8.	7 June 2010	El Paso, United States	Hard	(United States) Ahsha Rolle	(United States) Lindsay Lee-Waters (United States) Ashley Weinhold	6–3, 6–7^{(5–7)}, [10–7]
