= 2004 Hastings Direct International Championships =

- Date: 14–19 June
- Edition: 30th
- Category: Tier II
- Surface: Grass / Outdoor
- Location: Eastbourne, United Kingdom

Champions

Singles
- (Russia) Svetlana Kuznetsova

Doubles
- (Australia) Alicia Molik / (Spain) Magüi Serna
← 2003 ·	Eastbourne International	· 2005 →

The 2004 Hastings Direct International Championships was a women's tennis tournament played on grass courts at the Eastbourne Tennis Centre in Eastbourne in the United Kingdom that was part of Tier II of the 2004 WTA Tour. It was the 30th edition of the tournament and was held from 14 June through 19 June 2004.

== Finals ==
=== Singles ===
(Russia) Svetlana Kuznetsova defeated (Slovakia) Daniela Hantuchová 2–6, 7–6^{(7–2)}, 6–4

- It was Kuznetsova's 1st singles title of the year and the 3rd of her career.

=== Doubles ===
(Australia) Alicia Molik / (Spain) Magüi Serna defeated (Russia) Svetlana Kuznetsova / (Russia) Elena Likhovtseva 6–4, 6–4

- It was Molik's 1st doubles title of her career. It was Serna's only doubles title of the year and the 2nd of her career.
