= 2001 Britannic Asset Management International Championships – Singles =

Singles
- 2001 Britannic Asset Management International Championships

Final
- Champion: (United States) Lindsay Davenport
- Runner-up: (Spain) Magüi Serna
- Score: 6–2, 6–0

Events
Singles	Doubles
← 2000 ·	Britannic Asset Management International Championships	· 2002 →

The singles competition of the 2001 Britannic Asset Management International Championships was part of the 27th edition of the Eastbourne International tennis tournament, Tier II of the 2001 WTA Tour. Julie Halard-Decugis was the defending champion but did not compete that year. Lindsay Davenport won in the final 6–2, 6–0 against Magüi Serna.

== Seeds ==
A champion seed is indicated in bold text while text in italics indicates the round in which that seed was eliminated. The top four seeds received a bye to the second round.

1. (United States) **Lindsay Davenport (champion)**
2. (France) Nathalie Tauziat (second round)
3. (South Africa) Amanda Coetzer (second round)
4. (Bulgaria) Magdalena Maleeva (second round)
5. (France) Sandrine Testud (first round)
6. (Italy) Silvia Farina Elia (quarterfinals)
7. (United States) Meghann Shaughnessy (quarterfinals)
8. (Spain) Conchita Martínez (second round)

== Draw ==
=== Key ===
- Q = Qualifier
- WC = Wild card
- LL = Lucky loser
- Alt = Alternate
- SE = Special exempt
- PR = Protected ranking
- ITF = ITF entry
- JE = Junior exempt
- w/o = Walkover
- r = Retired
- d = Defaulted
- SR = Special ranking

=== Final ===
Final
1	(United States) **Lindsay Davenport**	**6**	**6**
	(Spain) Magüi Serna	2	0

=== Section 1 ===
First round
(Czech Republic) D Bedáňová	2	5
(France) **A-G Sidot**	**6**	**7**
Q	(Australia) **A Molik**	**6**	**7^{7}**
WC	(United Kingdom) L Ahl	1	6^{4}
(United States) L Osterloh	1	4
6	(Italy) **S Farina Elia**	**6**	**6**
(United States) **L Raymond**	**6**	**6**
(Zimbabwe) C Black	3	4
(United States) **C Rubin**	**6**	4	**6**
(Japan) A Sugiyama	2	**6**	4
Q	(United Kingdom) E Baltacha	3	3
8	(Spain) **C Martínez**	**6**	**6**

Second round
1	(United States) **L Davenport**	**6**	**6**
(France) A-G Sidot	3	2
Q	(Australia) A Molik
6	(Italy) **S Farina Elia**	**w/o**
3	(South Africa) A Coetzer	5	**6**	3
(United States) **L Raymond**	**7**	3	**6**
(United States) **C Rubin**	6^{4}	**7**	**6**
8	(Spain) C Martínez	**7^{7}**	5	0

Quarterfinals
1	(United States) **L Davenport**	3	**6**	**6**
6	(Italy) S Farina Elia	**6**	2	1
(United States) L Raymond	4	4
(United States) **C Rubin**	**6**	**6**

Semifinals
1	(United States) **L Davenport**	**6**	**6**
(United States) C Rubin	1	1

=== Section 2 ===
First round
7	(United States) **M Shaughnessy**	**7^{7}**	6^{2}	**6**
Q	(Tunisia) S Sfar	6^{2}	**7^{7}**	4
(Italy) F Schiavone	4	**6**	4
Q	(Australia) **E Dominikovic**	**6**	3	**6**
(Spain) **M Serna**	**6**	**6**
(United States) A Frazier	1	2
5	(France) S Testud	5	2
(Luxembourg) **A Kremer**	**7**	**6**
WC	(United Kingdom) L Latimer	5	3
(Russia) **E Likhovtseva**	**7**	**6**
(Thailand) **T Tanasugarn**	**6**	**6**
(United States) J Hopkins	1	2

Second round
7	(United States) **M Shaughnessy**	**7^{7}**	1	**7**
Q	(Australia) E Dominikovic	6^{4}	**6**	5
(Spain) **M Serna**	**7**	**6**
4	(Bulgaria) M Maleeva	5	2
(Luxembourg) A Kremer	1	6^{5}
(Russia) **E Likhovtseva**	**6**	**7^{7}**
(Thailand) **T Tanasugarn**	6^{1}	**7^{8}**	**6**
2	(France) N Tauziat	**7^{7}**	6^{6}	3

Quarterfinals
7	(United States) M Shaughnessy	0	6^{3}
(Spain) **M Serna**	**6**	**7^{7}**
(Russia) **E Likhovtseva**	**6**	**6**
(Thailand) T Tanasugarn	3	1

Semifinals
(Spain) **M Serna**	5	**6**	**7**
(Russia) E Likhovtseva	**7**	1	5
