= 2000 Direct Line International Championships =

- Date: 19–24 June
- Edition: 26th
- Category: Tier II
- Draw: 32S / 16D
- Prize money: $535,000
- Surface: Grass / outdoor
- Location: Eastbourne, United Kingdom

Champions

Singles
- (France) Julie Halard-Decugis

Doubles
- (Japan) Ai Sugiyama / (France) Nathalie Tauziat
← 1999 ·	Eastbourne International	· 2001 →

The 2000 Direct Line International Championships was a women's tennis tournament played on outdoor grass courts at the Eastbourne Tennis Centre in Eastbourne in the United Kingdom that was part of Tier II of the 2000 WTA Tour. The tournament was held from 19 June until 24 June 2000. Sixth-seeded Julie Halard-Decugis won the singles title.

== Finals ==
=== Singles ===
(France) Julie Halard-Decugis defeated (Belgium) Dominique Van Roost 7–6^{(7–4)}, 6–4

- It was Halard-Decugis' 1st singles title of the year and the 11th of her career.

=== Doubles ===
(Japan) Ai Sugiyama / (France) Nathalie Tauziat defeated (United States) Lisa Raymond / (Australia) Rennae Stubbs 2–6, 6–3, 7–6^{(7–3)}

- It was Sugiyama's 3rd doubles title of the year and the 13th of her career. It was Tauziat's 1st doubles title of the year and the 20th of her career.
