= 2001 Britannic Asset Management International Championships =

- Date: 18–24 June 2001
- Edition: 27th
- Category: Tier II
- Surface: Grass / outdoor
- Location: Eastbourne, United Kingdom

Champions

Singles
- (United States) Lindsay Davenport

Doubles
- (United States) Lisa Raymond / (Australia) Rennae Stubbs
← 2000 ·	Eastbourne International	· 2002 →

The 2001 Britannic Asset Management International Championships was a women's tennis tournament played on grass courts at the Eastbourne Tennis Centre in Eastbourne in the United Kingdom that was part of Tier II of the 2001 WTA Tour. It was the 27th edition of the tournament and was held from 18 through 24 June 2001, where Lindsay Davenport won the singles title.

== Finals ==
=== Singles ===
(United States) Lindsay Davenport defeated (Spain) Magüi Serna 6–2, 6–0

- It was Davenport's 3rd singles title of the year and the 33rd of her career.

=== Doubles ===
(United States) Lisa Raymond / (Australia) Rennae Stubbs defeated (Zimbabwe) Cara Black / (Russia) Elena Likhovtseva 6–2, 6–2

- It was Raymond's 4th doubles title of the year and the 22nd of her career. It was Stubbs' 4th doubles title of the year and the 28th of her career.
