= 2003 Hastings Direct International Championships =

- Date: 16–21 June
- Edition: 29th
- Category: Tier II
- Surface: Grass / outdoor
- Location: Eastbourne, United Kingdom

Champions

Singles
- (United States) Chanda Rubin

Doubles
- (United States) Lindsay Davenport / (United States) Lisa Raymond
← 2002 ·	Eastbourne International	· 2004 →

The 2003 Hastings Direct International Championships was a women's tennis tournament played on grass courts at the Eastbourne Tennis Centre in Eastbourne in the United Kingdom that was part of Tier II of the 2003 WTA Tour. It was the 29th edition of the tournament and was held from 16 June through 21 June 2003. Chanda Rubin won the singles title.

== Finals ==
=== Singles ===
(United States) Chanda Rubin defeated (Spain) Conchita Martínez 6–4, 3–6, 6–4

- It was Rubin's 2nd singles title of the year and the 7th of her career.

=== Doubles ===
(United States) Lindsay Davenport / (United States) Lisa Raymond defeated (United States) Jennifer Capriati / (Spain) Magüi Serna 6–3, 6–2

- It was Davenport's 3rd doubles title of the year and the 73rd of her career. It was Raymond's 3rd doubles title of the year and the 39th of her career.
