= 2004 Hastings Direct International Championships – Singles =

Singles
- 2004 Hastings Direct International Championships

Final
- Champion: (Russia) Svetlana Kuznetsova
- Runner-up: (Slovakia) Daniela Hantuchová
- Score: 2–6, 7–6^{(7–2)}, 6–4

Events
Singles	Doubles
← 2003 ·	Hastings Direct International Championships	· 2005 →

The singles competition of the 2004 Hastings Direct International Championships was part of the 30th edition of the Eastbourne International tennis tournament, Tier II of the 2004 WTA Tour. It was won by Svetlana Kuznetsova, who defeated Daniela Hantuchová 2–6, 7–6^{(7–2)}, 6–4.

Chanda Rubin was the defending champion but did not compete that year.

== Seeds ==
The champion seed is indicated in bold text. Text in italics indicates the round in which that seed was eliminated. The top four seeds received a bye to the second round.

1. (France) Amélie Mauresmo (semifinals)
2. (Russia) **Svetlana Kuznetsova (champion)**
3. (Japan) Ai Sugiyama (quarterfinals)
4. (Russia) Vera Zvonareva (semifinals)
5. (Italy) Silvia Farina Elia (first round)
6. (Israel) Anna Smashnova-Pistolesi (first round)
7. (Italy) Francesca Schiavone (second round)
8. (Bulgaria) Magdalena Maleeva (quarterfinals)

== Draw ==
=== Key ===
- Q = Qualifier
- WC = Wild card
- LL = Lucky loser
- Alt = Alternate
- SE = Special exempt
- PR = Protected ranking
- ITF = ITF entry
- JE = Junior exempt
- w/o = Walkover
- r = Retired
- d = Defaulted
- SR = Special ranking

=== Final ===
Final
WC	(Slovakia) Daniela Hantuchová	**6**	6^{2}	4
2	(Russia) **Svetlana Kuznetsova**	2	**7^{7}**	**6**

=== Top half ===
First round
WC	(United Kingdom) **A Janes**	**7**	**6**
Q	(China) J Zheng	5	3
(United States) L Raymond	**6**	2	0
(Spain) **C Martínez**	3	**6**	**6**
WC	(United Kingdom) A Keothavong	**7**	1	1
8	(Bulgaria) **M Maleeva**	5	**6**	**6**
(Russia) D Safina	6^{3}	5
Q	(Russia) **E Likhovtseva**	**7^{7}**	**7**
WC	(Slovakia) **D Hantuchová**	**7**	3	**6**
(United States) A Frazier	5	**6**	2
(Croatia) **K Šprem**	**6**	**6**
6	(Israel) A Smashnova-Pistolesi	2	4

Second round
1	(France) **A Mauresmo**	**6**	**6**
WC	(United Kingdom) A Janes	2	4
(Spain) C Martínez	**6**	5	4
8	(Bulgaria) **M Maleeva**	3	**7**	**6**
3	(Japan) **A Sugiyama**	**7**	4	**6**
(Russia) E Likhovtseva	5	**6**	3
WC	(Slovakia) **D Hantuchová**	**6**	2	**6**
(Croatia) K Šprem	3	**6**	4

Quarterfinals
1	(France) **A Mauresmo**	**6**	**6**
8	(Bulgaria) M Maleeva	4	3
3	(Japan) A Sugiyama	1	6^{7}
WC	(Slovakia) **D Hantuchová**	**6**	**7^{9}**

Semifinals
1	(France) A Mauresmo	**6**	4	4
WC	(Slovakia) **D Hantuchová**	4	**6**	**6**

=== Bottom half ===
First round
5	(Italy) S Farina Elia	5	0
(Russia) **E Bovina**	**7**	**6**
(Spain) **M Sánchez Lorenzo**	**6**	**7^{7}**
(Spain) M Serna	4	6^{2}
(France) **N Dechy**	**6**	**6**
(Colombia) F Zuluaga	2	1
7	(Italy) **F Schiavone**	2	**7**	**7^{7}**
Q	(Australia) A Molik	**6**	5	6^{2}
(Slovenia) **T Pisnik**	**6**	**6**
(Serbia and Montenegro) J Dokić	2	2
(Venezuela) **M Vento-Kabchi**	**6**	**6**
Q	(Zimbabwe) C Black	4	1

Second round
(Russia) E Bovina	4	**6**	2
(Spain) **M Sánchez Lorenzo**	**6**	1	**6**
(France) N Dechy	1	**6**	3
4	(Russia) **V Zvonareva**	**6**	3	**6**
7	(Italy) F Schiavone	6^{2}	5
(Slovenia) **T Pisnik**	**7^{7}**	**7**
(Venezuela) M Vento-Kabchi	4	3
2	(Russia) **S Kuznetsova**	**6**	**6**

Quarterfinals
(Spain) M Sánchez Lorenzo	3	0
4	(Russia) **V Zvonareva**	**6**	**6**
(Slovenia) T Pisnik	**6**	2	3
2	(Russia) **S Kuznetsova**	3	**6**	**6**

Semifinals
4	(Russia) V Zvonareva	**6**	6^{2}	1
2	(Russia) **S Kuznetsova**	3	**7^{7}**	**6**
