= 2000 Direct Line International Championships – Doubles =

Doubles
- 2000 Direct Line International Championships

Final
- Champions: (Japan) Ai Sugiyama (France) Nathalie Tauziat
- Runners-up: (United States) Lisa Raymond (Australia) Rennae Stubbs
- Score: 2–6, 6–3, 7–6^{(7–3)}

Details
- Draw: 16
- Seeds: 4

Events
Singles	Doubles
← 1999 ·	Eastbourne International	· 2001 →

Martina Hingis and Anna Kournikova were the defending champions but Hingis did not compete this year. Kournikova partnered Natasha Zvereva and reached the quarterfinals where they were beaten by Els Callens and Dominique Van Roost.

Ai Sugiyama and Nathalie Tauziat won the title, beating Lisa Raymond and Rennae Stubbs in the final, 2–6, 6–3, 7–6^{(7–3)}.

== Seeds ==
Champion seeds are indicated in bold text while text in italics indicates the round in which those seeds were eliminated.

1. (United States) Lisa Raymond / (Australia) Rennae Stubbs (final)
2. (United States) Lindsay Davenport / (United States) Corina Morariu (first round)
3. (Russia) Anna Kournikova / (Belarus) Natasha Zvereva (quarterfinals)
4. (Japan) **Ai Sugiyama** / (France) **Nathalie Tauziat (champions)**

== Draw ==
=== Key ===
- Q = Qualifier
- WC = Wild card
- LL = Lucky loser
- Alt = Alternate
- SE = Special exempt
- PR = Protected ranking
- ITF = ITF entry
- JE = Junior exempt
- w/o = Walkover
- r = Retired
- d = Defaulted
- SR = Special ranking

First round
1	(United States) **L Raymond** **(Australia) R Stubbs**	**6**	**6**
(United States) K Po (France) A-G Sidot	4	2
(South Africa) **A Coetzer** **(United States) L McNeil**	**7**	**7**
(Belgium) L Courtois (Russia) E Likhovtseva	6^{5}	5
3	(Russia) **A Kournikova** **(Belarus) N Zvereva**	**6**	**7**
Q	(United States) L Osterloh (United States) A Stevenson	3	6^{7}
(South Africa) L Horn (Netherlands) C Vis	4	**6**	3
(Belgium) **E Callens** **(Belgium) D Van Roost**	**6**	3	**6**
(Hungary) K Marosi-Aracama (Spain) M Serna	6^{4}	4
(Australia) **A Molik** **(Slovenia) K Srebotnik**	**7**	**6**
WC	(South Africa) M De Swardt (United States) M Navratilova	4	6^{5}
4	(Japan) **A Sugiyama** **(France) N Tauziat**	**6**	**7**
(Canada) S Jeyaseelan (Croatia) J Kostanić	**6**	4	3
(United States) **A Frazier** **(United States) K Schlukebir**	3	**6**	**6**
(United States) **N Arendt** **(Netherlands) M Bollegraf**	**6**	4	**6**
2	(United States) L Davenport (United States) C Morariu	4	**6**	1

Quarterfinals
1	(United States) **L Raymond** **(Australia) R Stubbs**	**6**	**6**
(South Africa) A Coetzer (United States) L McNeil	2	4
3	(Russia) A Kournikova (Belarus) N Zvereva	3	**6**	5
(Belgium) **E Callens** **(Belgium) D Van Roost**	**6**	2	**7**
(Australia) A Molik (Slovenia) K Srebotnik	**7**	2	ret
4	(Japan) **A Sugiyama** **(France) N Tauziat**	5	1
(United States) A Frazier (United States) K Schlukebir	2	5
(United States) **N Arendt** **(Netherlands) M Bollegraf**	**6**	**7**

Semifinals
1	(United States) **L Raymond** **(Australia) R Stubbs**	**6**	**6**
(Belgium) E Callens (Belgium) D Van Roost	3	2
4	(Japan) **A Sugiyama** **(France) N Tauziat**	**7**	**6**
(United States) N Arendt (Netherlands) M Bollegraf	6^{2}	2

Final
1	(United States) Lisa Raymond (Australia) Rennae Stubbs	**6**	3	6^{3}
4	(Japan) **Ai Sugiyama** **(France) Nathalie Tauziat**	2	**6**	**7**
