= 2002 Britannic Asset Management International Championships =

- Date: 17–22 June
- Edition: 28th
- Category: Tier II
- Prize money: $585,000
- Surface: Grass / outdoor
- Location: Eastbourne, United Kingdom

Champions

Singles
- (United States) Chanda Rubin

Doubles
- (United States) Lisa Raymond / (Australia) Rennae Stubbs
← 2001 ·	Eastbourne International	· 2003 →

The 2002 Britannic Asset Management International Championships was a women's tennis tournament played on grass courts at the Eastbourne Tennis Centre in Eastbourne, United Kingdom that was part of Tier II of the 2002 WTA Tour. It was the 28th edition of the tournament and was held from 17 until 22 June 2002. Unseeded Chanda Rubin won the singles title.

== Finals ==
=== Singles ===
(United States) Chanda Rubin defeated (Russia) Anastasia Myskina 6–1, 6–3

- It was Rubin's 1st singles title of the year and the 4th of her career.

=== Doubles ===
(United States) Lisa Raymond / (Australia) Rennae Stubbs defeated (Zimbabwe) Cara Black / (Russia) Elena Likhovtseva 6–7^{(5–7)}, 7–6^{(8–6)}, 6–2

- It was Raymond's 7th doubles title of the year and the 34th of her career. It was Stubbs' 7th title of the year and the 38th of her career.
