= 2002 Britannic Asset Management International Championships – Doubles =

Doubles
- 2002 Britannic Asset Management International Championships

Final
- Champions: (United States) Lisa Raymond (Australia) Rennae Stubbs
- Runners-up: (Zimbabwe) Cara Black (Russia) Elena Likhovtseva
- Score: 6–7 ^{(5–7)}, 7–6 ^{(8–6)}, 6–2

Details
- Draw: 16
- Seeds: 4

Events
Singles	Doubles
← 2001 ·	Eastbourne International	· 2003 →

Lisa Raymond and Rennae Stubbs successfully defended their title by winning in the final 6–7 ^{(5–7)}, 7–6 ^{(8–6)}, 6–2 over Cara Black and Elena Likhovtseva.

== Seeds ==
Champion seeds are indicated in bold text while text in italics indicates the round in which those seeds were eliminated.

1. (United States) **Lisa Raymond** / (Australia) **Rennae Stubbs (champions)**
2. (Zimbabwe) Cara Black / (Russia) Elena Likhovtseva (final)
3. (United States) Kimberly Po-Messerli / (France) Nathalie Tauziat (quarterfinals)
4. (Australia) Nicole Pratt / (Japan) Ai Sugiyama (semifinals)

== Draw ==
=== Key ===
- Q = Qualifier
- WC = Wild card
- LL = Lucky loser
- Alt = Alternate
- SE = Special exempt
- PR = Protected ranking
- ITF = ITF entry
- JE = Junior exempt
- w/o = Walkover
- r = Retired
- d = Defaulted
- SR = Special ranking

First round
1	(United States) **L Raymond** (Australia) **R Stubbs**	1	**6**	**6**
Q	(United States) A Frazier (United Kingdom) J Pullin	**6**	1	1
(Russia) A Kournikova (United States) C Rubin	**6**	4	4
(Chinese Taipei) **J Lee** (Indonesia) **W Prakusya**	3	**6**	**6**
3	(United States) **K Po-Messerli** (France) **N Tauziat**	**w/o**
(Italy) R Grande (Uzbekistan) I Tulyaganova
(Switzerland) P Schnyder (Spain) M Serna	3	2
(Slovakia) **D Hantuchová** (United States) **M Shaughnessy**	**6**	**6**
WC	(United States) M Navratilova (Belarus) N Zvereva	**6**	5	4
(South Africa) **A Coetzer** (United States) **L McNeil**	3	**7**	**6**
WC	(Czech Republic) D Bedáňová (Switzerland) E Gagliardi	**6**	4	4
4	(Australia) **N Pratt** (Japan) **A Sugiyama**	3	**6**	**6**
(Italy) T Garbin (Slovakia) J Husárová	4	2
(Australia) **E Dominikovic** (Italy) **S Farina Elia**	**6**	**6**
(France) N Dechy (France) M Pierce	2	2
2	(Zimbabwe) **C Black** (Russia) **E Likhovtseva**	**6**	**6**

Quarterfinals
1	(United States) **L Raymond** (Australia) **R Stubbs**	**6**	**6**
(Chinese Taipei) J Lee (Indonesia) W Prakusya	2	3
3	(United States) K Po-Messerli (France) N Tauziat	1	**6**	4
(Slovakia) **D Hantuchová** (United States) **M Shaughnessy**	**6**	2	**6**
(South Africa) A Coetzer (United States) L McNeil	2	3
4	(Australia) **N Pratt** (Japan) **A Sugiyama**	**6**	**6**
(Australia) E Dominikovic (Italy) S Farina Elia	1	**6**	0
2	(Zimbabwe) **C Black** (Russia) **E Likhovtseva**	**6**	4	**6**

Semifinals
1	(United States) **L Raymond** (Australia) **R Stubbs**	3	**6**	**6**
(Slovakia) D Hantuchová (United States) M Shaughnessy	**6**	4	2
4	(Australia) N Pratt (Japan) A Sugiyama	4	1
2	(Zimbabwe) **C Black** (Russia) **E Likhovtseva**	**6**	**6**

Final
1	(United States) **Lisa Raymond** (Australia) **Rennae Stubbs**	6^{5}	**7^{8}**	**6**
2	(Zimbabwe) Cara Black (Russia) Elena Likhovtseva	**7^{7}**	6^{6}	2
