= 2001 Britannic Asset Management International Championships – Doubles =

Doubles
- 2001 Britannic Asset Management International Championships

Final
- Champions: (United States) Lisa Raymond (Australia) Rennae Stubbs
- Runners-up: (Zimbabwe) Cara Black (Russia) Elena Likhovtseva
- Score: 6–2, 6–2

Details
- Draw: 16
- Seeds: 4

Events
Singles	Doubles
← 2000 ·	Eastbourne International	· 2002 →

Ai Sugiyama and Nathalie Tauziat were the defending champions but they competed with different partners that year, Sugiyama with Daniela Hantuchová and Tauziat with Kimberly Po-Messerli.

Po-Messerli and Tauziat lost in the first round to Dája Bedáňová and Conchita Martínez.

Hantuchová and Sugiyama lost in the semifinals to Cara Black and Elena Likhovtseva.

Lisa Raymond and Rennae Stubbs won in the final 6–2, 6–2 against Black and Likhovtseva.

== Seeds ==
Champion seeds are indicated in bold text while text in italics indicates the round in which those seeds were eliminated.

1. (United States) **Lisa Raymond** / (Australia) **Rennae Stubbs (champions)**
2. (Zimbabwe) Cara Black / (Russia) Elena Likhovtseva (final)
3. (United States) Kimberly Po-Messerli / (France) Nathalie Tauziat (first round)
4. (United States) Nicole Arendt / (Netherlands) Caroline Vis (first round)

== Draw ==
=== Key ===
- Q = Qualifier
- WC = Wild card
- LL = Lucky loser
- Alt = Alternate
- SE = Special exempt
- PR = Protected ranking
- ITF = ITF entry
- JE = Junior exempt
- w/o = Walkover
- r = Retired
- d = Defaulted
- SR = Special ranking

First round
1	(United States) **L Raymond** (Australia) **R Stubbs**	**6**	**6**
(United Kingdom) J Pullin (United Kingdom) L Woodroffe	3	2
(France) **É Loit** (France) **A-G Sidot**	**6**	**6**
(Italy) S Farina Elia (Bulgaria) M Maleeva	1	4
4	(United States) N Arendt (Netherlands) C Vis	1	4
(South Africa) **A Coetzer** (United States) **L McNeil**	**6**	**6**
(United States) **M Navratilova** (Spain) **A Sánchez Vicario**
(Spain) M Serna (France) S Testud
Q	(United States) A Bradshaw (United States) J Hopkins	4	**7^{7}**	0
(Slovakia) **D Hantuchová** (Japan) **A Sugiyama**	**6**	6^{3}	**6**
WC	(Czech Republic) **D Bedáňová** (Spain) **C Martínez**	1	**6**	**6**
3	(United States) K Po-Messerli (France) N Tauziat	**6**	2	2
(South Africa) **L Huber** (United States) **M Shaughnessy**	**6**	**7^{7}**
(Japan) R Hiraki (United States) L Osterloh	4	6^{4}
(United States) A Frazier (United States) K Schlukebir	2	5
2	(Zimbabwe) **C Black** (Russia) **E Likhovtseva**	**6**	**7**

Quarterfinals
1	(United States) **L Raymond** (Australia) **R Stubbs**	**6**	**6**
(France) É Loit (France) A-G Sidot	1	2
(South Africa) A Coetzer (United States) L McNeil	**7**	3	2
(United States) **M Navratilova** (Spain) **A Sánchez Vicario**	5	**6**	**6**
(Slovakia) **D Hantuchová** (Japan) **A Sugiyama**	**6**	**6**
WC	(Czech Republic) D Bedáňová (Spain) C Martínez	2	3
(South Africa) L Huber (United States) M Shaughnessy	3	3
2	(Zimbabwe) **C Black** (Russia) **E Likhovtseva**	**6**	**6**

Semifinals
1	(United States) **L Raymond** (Australia) **R Stubbs**	2	**6**	**6**
(United States) M Navratilova (Spain) A Sánchez Vicario	**6**	4	4
(Slovakia) D Hantuchová (Japan) A Sugiyama	**7^{9}**	3	1
2	(Zimbabwe) **C Black** (Russia) **E Likhovtseva**	6^{7}	**6**	**6**

Final
1	(United States) **Lisa Raymond** (Australia) **Rennae Stubbs**	**6**	**6**
2	(Zimbabwe) Cara Black (Russia) Elena Likhovtseva	2	2
