= 2003 Hastings Direct International Championships – Singles =

Singles
- 2003 Hastings Direct International Championships

Final
- Champion: (United States) Chanda Rubin
- Runner-up: (Spain) Conchita Martínez
- Score: 6–4, 3–6, 6–4

Details
- Draw: 28
- Seeds: 8

Events
| Singles | Doubles |
| ← 2002 · | Hastings Direct International Championships | · 2004 → |

The singles competition of the 2003 Hastings Direct International Championships was part of the 29th edition of the Eastbourne International tennis tournament, Tier II of the 2003 WTA Tour. Chanda Rubin was the defending champion and won in the final 6–4, 3–6, 6–4 against Conchita Martínez.

== Seeds ==
A champion seed is indicated in bold text while text in italics indicates the round in which that seed was eliminated. The top four seeds received a bye to the second round.

1. (United States) Lindsay Davenport (second round)
2. (United States) **Chanda Rubin (champion)**
3. (United States) Jennifer Capriati (semifinals)
4. (Slovakia) Daniela Hantuchová (quarterfinals)
5. (Russia) Anastasia Myskina (first round)
6. (Federal Republic of Yugoslavia) Jelena Dokić (first round)
7. (Japan) Ai Sugiyama (second round)
8. (Bulgaria) Magdalena Maleeva (quarterfinals)

== Draw ==
=== Key ===
- Q = Qualifier
- WC = Wild card
- LL = Lucky loser
- Alt = Alternate
- SE = Special exempt
- PR = Protected ranking
- ITF = ITF entry
- JE = Junior exempt
- w/o = Walkover
- r = Retired
- d = Defaulted
- SR = Special ranking

=== Final ===
| Final |
| | (Spain) Conchita Martínez | 4 | **6** | 4 |
| 2 | (United States) **Chanda Rubin** | **6** | 3 | **6** |

=== Top half ===
First round
(Argentina) C Fernández | 2 | 1
(Italy) **S Farina Elia** | **6** | **6**
(Russia) **E Likhovtseva** | **6** | **6**
Q | (Croatia) S Talaja | 4 | 1
(United States) L Raymond | **7^{8}** | 3 | 4
8 | (Bulgaria) **M Maleeva** | 6^{6} | **6** | **6**
WC | (United Kingdom) L Ahl | 3 | 3
(United States) **A Stevenson** | **6** | **6**
(Spain) **C Martínez** | **6** | **6**
(Italy) F Schiavone | 1 | 3
(South Africa) **A Coetzer** | **6** | **6**
5 | (Russia) A Myskina | 2 | 4

Second round
WC/1 | (United States) L Davenport | 4 | **6** | 6^{3}
(Italy) **S Farina Elia** | **6** | 3 | **7^{7}**
(Russia) E Likhovtseva | **6** | 5 | 3
8 | (Bulgaria) **M Maleeva** | 3 | **7** | **6**
4 | (Slovakia) **D Hantuchová** | **7^{7}** | **6**
(United States) A Stevenson | 6^{3} | 4
(Spain) **C Martínez** | **7** | **6**
(South Africa) A Coetzer | 5 | 3

Quarterfinals
(Italy) **S Farina Elia** | 5 | **6** | **6**
8 | (Bulgaria) M Maleeva | **7** | 4 | 4
4 | (Slovakia) D Hantuchová | 2 | 3
(Spain) **C Martínez** | **6** | **6**

Semifinals
(Italy) S Farina Elia | 2 | 4
(Spain) **C Martínez** | **6** | **6**

=== Bottom half ===
First round
7 | (Japan) **A Sugiyama** | **6** | **6**
WC | (United Kingdom) A Keothavong | 2 | 2
(France) **N Dechy** | **6** | **6**
(United States) M Shaughnessy | 3 | 3
Q | (United Kingdom) A Janes | 5 | 4
Q | (United States) **A Frazier** | **7** | **6**
6 | (Federal Republic of Yugoslavia) J Dokić | 3 | 1
Q | (Japan) **S Obata** | **6** | **6**
(Israel) **A Pistolesi** | **6** | **7^{7}**
(Greece) E Daniilidou | 2 | 6^{2}
(Russia) E Bovina | 6^{2} | **6** | 4
(Thailand) **T Tanasugarn** | **7^{7}** | 4 | **6**

Second round
7 | (Japan) A Sugiyama | 1 | 5
(France) **N Dechy** | **6** | **7**
Q | (United States) A Frazier | 1 | 5
3 | (United States) **J Capriati** | **6** | **7**
Q | (Japan) S Obata | 6^{5} | **6** | 6^{5}
(Israel) **A Pistolesi** | **7^{7}** | 4 | **7^{7}**
(Thailand) T Tanasugarn | 0 | 3
2 | (United States) **C Rubin** | **6** | **6**

Quarterfinals
(France) N Dechy | 1 | 5
3 | (United States) **J Capriati** | **6** | **7**
(Israel) A Pistolesi | 1 | 0
2 | (United States) **C Rubin** | **6** | **6**

Semifinals
3 | (United States) J Capriati | **6** | 6^{5} | 2
2 | (United States) **C Rubin** | 2 | **7^{7}** | **6**
