= 2004 Hastings Direct International Championships – Doubles =

Doubles
- 2004 Hastings Direct International Championships

Final
- Champions: (Australia) Alicia Molik (Spain) Magüi Serna
- Runners-up: (Russia) Svetlana Kuznetsova (Russia) Elena Likhovtseva
- Score: 6–4, 6–4

Details
- Draw: 16
- Seeds: 4

Events
Singles	Doubles
← 2003 ·	Eastbourne International	· 2005 →

Lindsay Davenport and Lisa Raymond were the defending champions but only Raymond competed that year with Martina Navratilova.

Navratilova and Raymond lost in the quarterfinals to Alicia Molik and Magüi Serna.

Molik and Serna won in the final 6–4, 6–4 against Svetlana Kuznetsova and Elena Likhovtseva.

== Seeds ==
Text in italics indicates the round in which those seeds were eliminated.

1. (Russia) Svetlana Kuznetsova / (Russia) Elena Likhovtseva (final)
2. (United States) Martina Navratilova / (United States) Lisa Raymond (quarterfinals)
3. (South Africa) Liezel Huber / (Japan) Ai Sugiyama (quarterfinals)
4. (Zimbabwe) Cara Black / (Australia) Rennae Stubbs (quarterfinals)

== Draw ==
=== Key ===
- Q = Qualifier
- WC = Wild card
- LL = Lucky loser
- Alt = Alternate
- SE = Special exempt
- PR = Protected ranking
- ITF = ITF entry
- JE = Junior exempt
- w/o = Walkover
- r = Retired
- d = Defaulted
- SR = Special ranking

First round
1	(Russia) S Kuznetsova (Russia) E Likhovtseva	6	4	6
WC	(United Kingdom) E Baltacha (United Kingdom) A Janes	1	6	1
WC	(Russia) D Safina (Russia) V Zvonareva	4	7	2
(France) M Bartoli (Switzerland) M Casanova	6	5	6
4	(Zimbabwe) C Black (Australia) R Stubbs	6	6
(Bulgaria) M Maleeva (Croatia) S Talaja	3	4
(China) T Li (China) T Sun	6^{3}	4
(Ukraine) T Perebiynis (Venezuela) M Vento-Kabchi	7^{7}	6
(Russia) E Bovina (Australia) N Pratt	7^{7}	6
(Japan) S Asagoe (Belgium) E Callens	6^{2}	0
(Italy) F Schiavone (Italy) S Farina Elia	3	2
3	(South Africa) L Huber (Japan) A Sugiyama	6	6
(Slovakia) J Husárová (Spain) C Martínez	4	2
(Australia) A Molik (Spain) M Serna	6	6
Q	(Italy) R Grande (United States) S Reeves	1	4
2	(United States) M Navratilova (United States) L Raymond	6	6

Quarterfinals
1	(Russia) S Kuznetsova (Russia) E Likhovtseva	6	5	6
(France) M Bartoli (Switzerland) M Casanova	1	7	0
4	(Zimbabwe) C Black (Australia) R Stubbs	6^{3}	4
(Ukraine) T Perebiynis (Venezuela) M Vento-Kabchi	7^{7}	6
(Russia) E Bovina (Australia) N Pratt	6	6
3	(South Africa) L Huber (Japan) A Sugiyama	4	1
(Australia) A Molik (Spain) M Serna	6	3	6
2	(United States) M Navratilova (United States) L Raymond	2	6	4

Semifinals
1	(Russia) S Kuznetsova (Russia) E Likhovtseva	6	6
(Ukraine) T Perebiynis (Venezuela) M Vento-Kabchi	2	4
(Russia) E Bovina (Australia) N Pratt	4	6	2
(Australia) A Molik (Spain) M Serna	6	3	6

Final
1	(Russia) Svetlana Kuznetsova (Russia) Elena Likhovtseva	4	4
(Australia) Alicia Molik (Spain) Magüi Serna	6	6
