= 2003 Hastings Direct International Championships – Doubles =

Doubles
- 2003 Hastings Direct International Championships

Final
- Champions: (United States) Lindsay Davenport (United States) Lisa Raymond
- Runners-up: (United States) Jennifer Capriati (Spain) Magüi Serna
- Score: 6–3, 6–2

Details
- Draw: 16
- Seeds: 4

Events
Singles	Doubles
← 2002 ·	Eastbourne International	· 2004 →

Lisa Raymond and Rennae Stubbs were the defending champions but they competed with different partners that year, Raymond with Lindsay Davenport and Stubbs with Jelena Dokić.

Dokić and Stubbs lost in the quarterfinals to Stéphanie Foretz and Antonella Serra Zanetti.

Davenport and Raymond won in the final 6–3, 6–2 against Jennifer Capriati and Magüi Serna.

== Seeds ==
Champion seeds are indicated in bold text while text in italics indicates the round in which those seeds were eliminated.

1. (Russia) Elena Likhovtseva / (Japan) Ai Sugiyama (quarterfinals)
2. (United States) **Lindsay Davenport** / (United States) **Lisa Raymond (champions)**
3. (Federal Republic of Yugoslavia) Jelena Dokić / (Australia) Rennae Stubbs (quarterfinals)
4. (Slovakia) Daniela Hantuchová / (United States) Chanda Rubin (semifinals)

== Draw ==
=== Key ===
- Q = Qualifier
- WC = Wild card
- LL = Lucky loser
- Alt = Alternate
- SE = Special exempt
- PR = Protected ranking
- ITF = ITF entry
- JE = Junior exempt
- w/o = Walkover
- r = Retired
- d = Defaulted
- SR = Special ranking

First round
1	(Russia) **E Likhovtseva** (Japan) **A Sugiyama**	**6**	**6**
(Italy) S Farina Elia (Italy) T Garbin	2	3
(Switzerland) E Gagliardi (United States) M Shaughnessy	6^{2}	5
WC	(United States) **J Capriati** (Spain) **M Serna**	**7^{7}**	**7**
3	(Federal Republic of Yugoslavia) **J Dokić** (Australia) **R Stubbs**	**6**	4	**6**
(Argentina) C Fernández (United States) S Reeves	4	**6**	3
(Australia) E Dominikovic (Australia) S Stosur	4	**7^{7}**	3
LL	(France) **S Foretz** (Italy) **A Serra Zanetti**	**6**	6^{2}	**6**
(South Africa) **L Huber** (Bulgaria) **M Maleeva**	**6**	**6**
WC	(United Kingdom) J O'Donoghue (United Kingdom) J Pullin	2	2
(Russia) E Kulikovskaya (Russia) A Myskina	**7^{8}**	3	3
4	(Slovakia) **D Hantuchová** (United States) **C Rubin**	6^{6}	**6**	**6**
(Australia) A Molik (United States) M Navratilova	2	**7^{7}**	3
(Russia) **E Bovina** (France) **N Dechy**	**6**	6^{3}	**6**
Q	(Japan) A Morigami (Japan) S Obata	1	5
2	(United States) **L Davenport** (United States) **L Raymond**	**6**	**7**

Quarterfinals
1	(Russia) E Likhovtseva (Japan) A Sugiyama	5	6^{3}
WC	(United States) **J Capriati** (Spain) **M Serna**	**7**	**7^{7}**
3	(Federal Republic of Yugoslavia) J Dokić (Australia) R Stubbs	4	4
LL	(France) **S Foretz** (Italy) **A Serra Zanetti**	**6**	**6**
(South Africa) L Huber (Bulgaria) M Maleeva
4	(Slovakia) **D Hantuchová** (United States) **C Rubin**	**w/o**
(Russia) E Bovina (France) N Dechy	4	2
2	(United States) **L Davenport** (United States) **L Raymond**	**6**	**6**

Semifinals
WC	(United States) **J Capriati** (Spain) **M Serna**	**7**	**6**
LL	(France) S Foretz (Italy) A Serra Zanetti	5	2
4	(Slovakia) D Hantuchová (United States) C Rubin	1	**6**	1
2	(United States) **L Davenport** (United States) **L Raymond**	**6**	4	**6**

Final
WC	(United States) Jennifer Capriati (Spain) Magüi Serna	3	2
2	(United States) **Lindsay Davenport** (United States) **Lisa Raymond**	**6**	**6**
