= 2002 Britannic Asset Management International Championships – Singles =

Singles
- 2002 Britannic Asset Management International Championships

Final
- Champion: (United States) Chanda Rubin
- Runner-up: (Russia) Anastasia Myskina
- Score: 6–1, 6–3

Events
Singles	Doubles
← 2001 ·	Britannic Asset Management International Championships	· 2003 →

The singles competition of the 2002 Britannic Asset Management International Championships was part of the 28th edition of the Eastbourne International tennis tournament, Tier II of the 2002 WTA Tour. Lindsay Davenport was the defending champion but did not compete that year. Chanda Rubin won in the final 6–1, 6–3 against Anastasia Myskina.

== Seeds ==
A champion seed is indicated in bold text while text in italics indicates the round in which that seed was eliminated. The top four seeds received a bye to the second round.

1. (Federal Republic of Yugoslavia) Jelena Dokić (second round)
2. (France) Sandrine Testud (second round)
3. (Slovakia) Daniela Hantuchová (semifinals)
4. (Italy) Silvia Farina Elia (quarterfinals)
5. (United States) Meghann Shaughnessy (quarterfinals)
6. (Uzbekistan) Iroda Tulyaganova (second round)
7. (Switzerland) Patty Schnyder (first round)
8. (Thailand) Tamarine Tanasugarn (first round)

== Draw ==
=== Key ===
- Q = Qualifier
- WC = Wild card
- LL = Lucky loser
- Alt = Alternate
- SE = Special exempt
- PR = Protected ranking
- ITF = ITF entry
- JE = Junior exempt
- w/o = Walkover
- r = Retired
- d = Defaulted
- SR = Special ranking

=== Final ===
Final
(United States) **Chanda Rubin**	**6**	**6**
(Russia) Anastasia Myskina	1	3

=== Section 1 ===
First round
Q	(Russia) E Likhovtseva	3	**7^{8}**	6^{7}
(Czech Republic) **D Bedáňová**	**6**	6^{6}	**7^{9}**
(Italy) **R Grande**	6^{4}	**6**	**6**
WC	(Russia) A Kournikova	**7^{7}**	3	1
Q	(Canada) V Webb	**7^{7}**	6^{8}	6^{4}
5	(United States) **M Shaughnessy**	6^{2}	**7^{10}**	**7^{7}**
(Italy) **F Schiavone**	4	**6**	**6**
(South Africa) A Coetzer	**6**	3	4
(Spain) **M Serna**	**6**	**6**
Q	(Indonesia) W Prakusya	3	2
(United States) **C Rubin**	**6**	1	**6**
8	(Thailand) T Tanasugarn	1	**6**	1

Second round
1	(Federal Republic of Yugoslavia) J Dokić	4	**6**	2
(Czech Republic) **D Bedáňová**	**6**	1	**6**
(Italy) R Grande	4	2
5	(United States) **M Shaughnessy**	**6**	**6**
4	(Italy) **S Farina Elia**	4	**7^{9}**	**6**
(Italy) F Schiavone	**6**	6^{7}	2
(Spain) M Serna	2	2
(United States) **C Rubin**	**6**	**6**

Quarterfinals
(Czech Republic) **D Bedáňová**	**7^{8}**	**6**
5	(United States) M Shaughnessy	6^{6}	2
4	(Italy) S Farina Elia	1	0
(United States) **C Rubin**	**6**	**6**

Semifinals
(Czech Republic) D Bedáňová	4	1
(United States) **C Rubin**	**6**	**6**

=== Section 2 ===
First round
6	(Uzbekistan) **I Tulyaganova**	**6**	6^{7}	**6**
(Israel) A Smashnova	3	**7^{9}**	4
(United States) A Stevenson	6^{6}	2
Q	(United States) **A Frazier**	**7^{8}**	**6**
WC	(United States) **M Navratilova**	**6**	4	**6**
(Russia) T Panova	1	**6**	2
7	(Switzerland) P Schnyder	4	4
(Russia) **A Myskina**	**6**	**6**
(Japan) **A Sugiyama**	**6**	**6**
WC	(France) M Pierce	4	4
(Luxembourg) **A Kremer**	**6**	2	**6**
(France) N Dechy	4	**6**	4

Second round
6	(Uzbekistan) I Tulyaganova	5	r
Q	(United States) **A Frazier**	**6**
WC	(United States) M Navratilova	**6**	2	2
3	(Slovakia) **D Hantuchová**	2	**6**	**6**
(Russia) **A Myskina**	**7**	**7^{7}**
(Japan) A Sugiyama	5	6^{3}
(Luxembourg) **A Kremer**	4	**6**	**6**
2	(France) S Testud	**6**	3	1

Quarterfinals
Q	(United States) A Frazier	6^{4}	1
3	(Slovakia) **D Hantuchová**	**7^{7}**	**6**
(Russia) **A Myskina**	**6**	**7**
(Luxembourg) A Kremer	2	5

Semifinals
3	(Slovakia) D Hantuchová	2	1
(Russia) **A Myskina**	**6**	**6**
