= 2000 Direct Line International Championships – Singles =

Singles
- 2000 Direct Line International Championships

Final
- Champion: (France) Julie Halard-Decugis
- Runner-up: (Belgium) Dominique Van Roost
- Score: 7–6^{(7–4)}, 6–4

Details
- Draw: 28
- Seeds: 8

Events
Singles	Doubles
← 1999 ·	Eastbourne International	· 2001 →

The Women's singles competition of the 2000 Direct Line International Championships was part of the 26th edition of the Eastbourne International tennis tournament, Tier II of the 2000 WTA Tour. Natasha Zvereva was the defending champion but lost in the second round to Anna Kournikova. Julie Halard-Decugis won in the final 7–6^{(7–4)}, 6–4 against Dominique Van Roost.

== Seeds ==
A champion seed is indicated in bold text while text in italics indicates the round in which that seed was eliminated. The top four seeds received a bye to the second round.

1. (United States) Lindsay Davenport (quarterfinals)
2. (France) Nathalie Tauziat (quarterfinals)
3. (South Africa) Amanda Coetzer (quarterfinals)
4. (Russia) Anna Kournikova (quarterfinals)
5. (Belgium) Dominique Van Roost (final)
6. (France) **Julie Halard-Decugis (champion)**
7. (Japan) Ai Sugiyama (first round)
8. (United States) Chanda Rubin (semifinals)

== Draw ==
Key

- Q = Qualifier
- WC = Wild card
- LL = Lucky loser
- Alt = Alternate
- ITF = ITF entry
- PR = Protected ranking
- SR = Special ranking
- SE = Special exempt
- JE = Junior exempt
- JR = Junior Accelerator Programme entrant
- CO = College Accelerator Programme entrant
- NG = Next Gen Accelerator Program entrant
- w/o = Walkover
- r = Retired
- d = Defaulted

=== Final ===
Final
5	(Belgium) Dominique Van Roost	6^{4}	4
6/WC	(France) **Julie Halard-Decugis**	**7**	**6**

=== Section 1 ===
First round
(France) A-G Sidot	2	2
Q	(Germany) **J Kandarr**	**6**	**6**
WC	(United Kingdom) J Pullin	6^{3}	5
(Russia) **E Likhovtseva**	**7**	**7**
LL	(Slovenia) T Pisnik	4	6^{6}
5	(Belgium) **D Van Roost**	**6**	**7**
(Israel) **A Smashnova**	**6**	**6**
WC	(United Kingdom) L Latimer	1	3
(United States) A Stevenson	**7**	1	4
(Luxembourg) **A Kremer**	6^{3}	**6**	**6**
(Croatia) **S Talaja**	**6**	**6**
7	(Japan) A Sugiyama	3	2

Second round
1	(United States) **L Davenport**	**6**	3	**6**
Q	(Germany) J Kandarr	3	**6**	4
(Russia) E Likhovtseva	2	4
5	(Belgium) **D Van Roost**	**6**	**6**
3	(South Africa) **A Coetzer**	**6**	**6**
(Israel) A Smashnova	2	0
(Luxembourg) **A Kremer**	**6**	**6**
(Croatia) S Talaja	2	2

Quarterfinals
1	(United States) L Davenport	**6**	4	4
5	(Belgium) **D Van Roost**	4	**6**	**6**
3	(South Africa) A Coetzer	**6**	0	4
(Luxembourg) **A Kremer**	3	**6**	**6**

Semifinals
5	(Belgium) **D Van Roost**	4	**7**	**6**
(Luxembourg) A Kremer	**6**	5	1

=== Section 2 ===
First round
8	(United States) **C Rubin**	**7**	**6**
(France) S Pitkowski	5	3
Q	(Russia) **T Panova**	**6**	1	**6**
(Austria) S Plischke	4	**6**	3
(United States) L Raymond	5	3
(Belarus) **N Zvereva**	**7**	**6**
6/WC	(France) **J Halard-Decugis**	**6**	**6**
Q	(Venezuela) M A Vento	3	1
(United States) C Morariu	6^{5}	**7**	1
(France) **N Dechy**	**7**	5	**6**
(United States) A Frazier	4	6^{3}
Q	(Russia) **A Myskina**	**6**	**7**

Second round
8	(United States) **C Rubin**	**6**	**7**
Q	(Russia) T Panova	1	5
(Belarus) N Zvereva	3	1
4	(Russia) **A Kournikova**	**6**	**6**
6/WC	(France) **J Halard-Decugis**	**6**	**6**
(France) N Dechy	2	4
Q	(Russia) A Myskina	4	2
2	(France) **N Tauziat**	**6**	**6**

Quarterfinals
8	(United States) **C Rubin**	**7**	0	**6**
4	(Russia) A Kournikova	5	**6**	3
6/WC	(France) **J Halard-Decugis**	**6**	**6**
2	(France) N Tauziat	4	4

Semifinals
8	(United States) C Rubin	2	**6**	4
6/WC	(France) **J Halard-Decugis**	**6**	3	**6**
