= Eastbourne International =

Coordinates: 50°45′51″N 0°17′0″E

Lexus Eastbourne Open
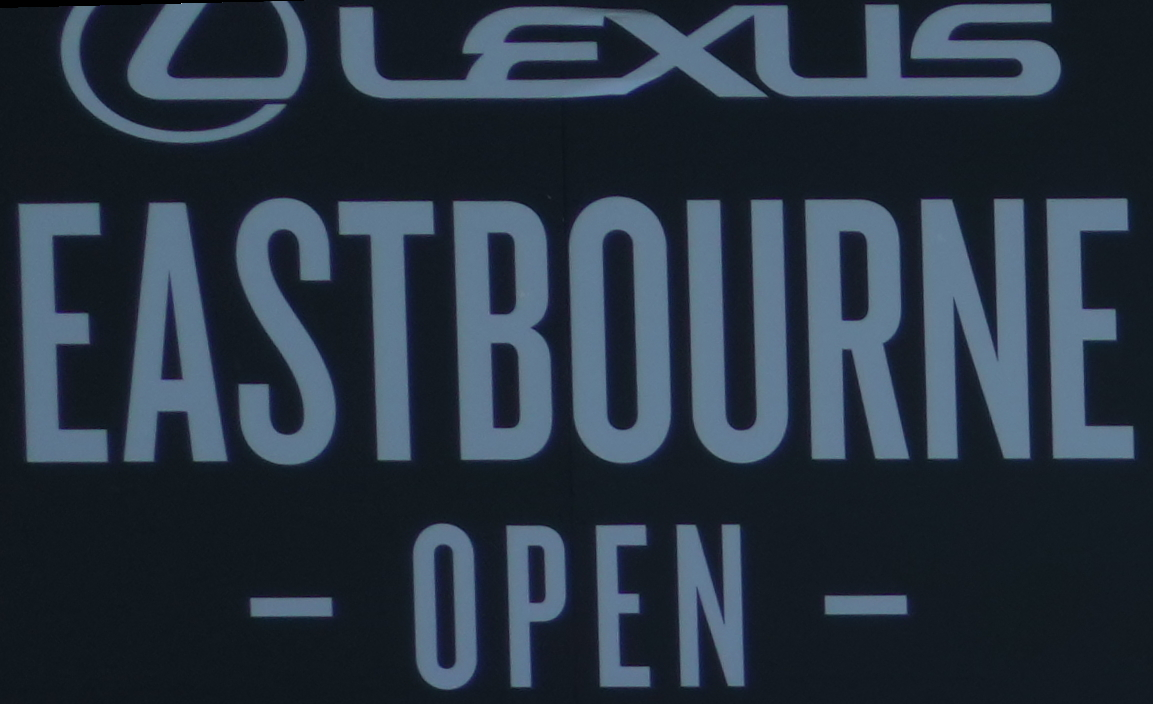

Tournament information
- Event name: Rothesay International Eastbourne (2022–2024); Lexus Eastbourne Open (2025–present)
- Founded: 1974 (WTA), 2009 (ATP)
- Editions: 51 for WTA, 15 for ATP (2025)
- Location: Eastbourne; United Kingdom
- Venue: Devonshire Park Lawn Tennis Club
- Surface: Grass - outdoors
- Website: Official website

Current champions (2026)
- Men's singles: (Belgium) Zizou Bergs
- Women's singles: (United States) Madison Keys
- Men's doubles: (Monaco) Hugo Nys (France) Édouard Roger-Vasselin
- Women's doubles: (Canada) Gabriela Dabrowski (Brazil) Luisa Stefani
ATP Tour
- Category: 250 series (2009–2014, 2017–present)
- Draw: 28S / 16Q / 16D
- Prize money: €773,465 (2026)
WTA Tour
- Category: WTA 500 (1974–2024); WTA 250 (2025–present)
- Draw: 32S / 24Q / 16D
- Prize money: US$499,000 (2026)

The Lexus Eastbourne Open (formerly Rothesay International Eastbourne) is a tennis tournament held at the Devonshire Park Lawn Tennis Club, Eastbourne, United Kingdom, since 1974. It is classified as an ATP 250 on the ATP Tour and a WTA 250 series on the WTA Tour (downgraded from WTA 500 in 2025), and also as a wheelchair tennis event on the WC 500 level. The event is played on outdoor grass courts, and is generally considered a "warm-up" for the Wimbledon Championships, which begins the following week.

== History ==
In 1977, the Federation Cup was hosted on the courts in place of the regular tournament.

The tournament was originally just part of the WTA Tour, but from 2009 it was combined as an ATP Tour event. It replaced the Nottingham Open grass court tournament from 2009–2014. Nottingham returned for 2015–2016 with no men's event in Eastbourne, however Eastbourne replaced the Nottingham event again from 2017 onwards. From 2022 until 2024, it was sponsored by Rothesay, with past sponsors including Viking Cruises, Nature Valley and AEGON.

== Combined event ==
During 2007, lack of sponsorship for the Eastbourne tournament led the Lawn Tennis Association to consider moving the tournament to London. However, as part of a general reorganisation of United Kingdom professional tennis tournaments, it was instead decided to merge the event with the Nottingham Open, traditionally held during the same week.

From 2009, therefore, the Eastbourne courts have hosted a combined women's and men's event until 2014. In 2015 and 2016 it was an only a ladies event (with the men's competition returning to Nottingham). In 2017, the Eastbourne tournament returned to being a combined event.

== Wheelchair event ==
Wheelchair tennis was introduced to the tournament in 2022 with a women's singles draw as part of the ITF Wheelchair Tennis Tour. Top seed Diede de Groot won the inaugural singles title, defeating Yui Kamiji in the final, while Kamiji and Zhenzhen Zhu captured the inaugural women's doubles title. The wheelchair events formed part of a series of ITF 2 British grass-court tournaments organised by the Lawn Tennis Association (LTA) in the lead-up to Wimbledon.

The tournament expanded its wheelchair programme in 2023 with the addition of a quad singles draw, which was relocated from the Birmingham Classic. Defending women's singles champion De Groot returned to Eastbourne to defend her title, and the tournament continued to serve as a key stop on the British grass-court season ahead of Wimbledon.

From 2024, the tournament has featured men's, women's and quad wheelchair events as part of the ITF Wheelchair Tennis Tour and the British grass-court swing leading up to Wimbledon.

For the first time, in 2025, the tournament hosted an ITF WC500 event.

In 2026, the tournament served as one of the principal venues for the international celebrations marking the 50th anniversary of wheelchair tennis. Devonshire Park hosted an induction ceremony honouring British players, coaches and contributors entering the ITF Wheelchair Tennis Hall of Champions, while the LTA and Getty Images launched a digital exhibition commemorating the history of wheelchair tennis.

== Past finals ==
=== Men's singles ===
Year	Champion	Runner-up	Score
↓ ATP Tour 250 ↓
2009	(Russia) Dmitry Tursunov	(Canada) Frank Dancevic	6–3, 7–6^{(7–5)}
2010	(France) Michaël Llodra	(Spain) Guillermo García-López	7–5, 6–2
2011	(Italy) Andreas Seppi	(Serbia) Janko Tipsarević	7–6^{(7–5)}, 3–6, 5–3, ret.
2012	(United States) Andy Roddick	(Italy) Andreas Seppi	6–3, 6–2
2013	(Spain) Feliciano López	(France) Gilles Simon	7–6^{(7–2)}, 6–7^{(5–7)}, 6–0
2014	(Spain) Feliciano López (2)	(France) Richard Gasquet	6–3, 6–7^{(5–7)}, 7–5
2015–16	Not held		
2017	(Serbia) Novak Djokovic	(France) Gaël Monfils	6–3, 6–4
2018	(Germany) Mischa Zverev	(Slovakia) Lukáš Lacko	6–4, 6–4
2019	(United States) Taylor Fritz	(United States) Sam Querrey	6–3, 6–4
2020	Cancelled due to the coronavirus pandemic		
2021	(Australia) Alex de Minaur	(Italy) Lorenzo Sonego	4–6, 6–4, 7–6^{(7–5)}
2022	(United States) Taylor Fritz (2)	(United States) Maxime Cressy	6–2, 6–7^{(4–7)}, 7–6^{(7–4)}
2023	(Argentina) Francisco Cerúndolo	(United States) Tommy Paul	6–4, 1–6, 6–4
2024	(United States) Taylor Fritz (3)	(Australia) Max Purcell	6–4, 6–3
2025	(United States) Taylor Fritz (4)	(United States) Jenson Brooksby	7–5, 6–1
2026	(Belgium) Zizou Bergs	(France) Ugo Humbert	3–6, 6–1, 6–4

=== Women's singles ===
Martina Navratilova holds the record for the most singles titles with 11.

Year	Champion	Runner-up	Score	Name
1974	(United States) Chris Evert	(United Kingdom) Virginia Wade	7–5, 6–4	John Player Tournament
1975	(United Kingdom) Virginia Wade	(United States) Billie Jean King	7–5, 4–6, 6–4	Eastbourne Championships
1976	(United States) Chris Evert (2)	(United Kingdom) Virginia Wade	8–6, 6–3	Colgate International
1977	Replaced by the 1977 Federation Cup			Colgate International
1978	(Czech Republic) Martina Navratilova	(United States) Chris Evert	6–4, 4–6, 9–7	Colgate International
1979	(United States) Chris Evert (3)	(Czech Republic) Martina Navratilova	7–5, 5–7, 13–11	Colgate International
1980	(United States) Tracy Austin	(Australia) Wendy Turnbull	7–6^{(7–3)}, 6–2	BMW Challenge
1981	(United States) Tracy Austin (2)	(United States) Andrea Jaeger	6–3, 6–4	BMW Championships
1982	(United States) Martina Navratilova (2)	(Czechoslovakia) Hana Mandlíková	6–4, 6–3	BMW Championships
1983	(United States) Martina Navratilova (3)	(Australia) Wendy Turnbull	6–1, 6–1	BMW Championships
1984	(United States) Martina Navratilova (4)	(United States) Kathy Jordan	6–4, 6–1	Eastbourne Championships
1985	(United States) Martina Navratilova (5)	(Czechoslovakia) Helena Suková	6–4, 6–3	Pilkington Glass Championships
1986	(United States) Martina Navratilova (6)	(Czechoslovakia) Helena Suková	3–6, 6–3, 6–4	Pilkington Glass Championships
1987	(Czechoslovakia) Helena Suková	(United States) Martina Navratilova	7–6^{(7–5)}, 6–3	Pilkington Glass Championships
1988	(United States) Martina Navratilova (7)	(Soviet Union) Natasha Zvereva	6–2, 6–2	Pilkington Glass Championships
1989	(United States) Martina Navratilova (8)	(Italy) Raffaella Reggi	7–6^{(7–2)}, 6–2	Pilkington Glass Championships
1990	(United States) Martina Navratilova (9)	(United States) Gretchen Magers	6–0, 6–2	Pilkington Glass Championships
1991	(United States) Martina Navratilova (10)	(Spain) Arantxa Sánchez Vicario	6–4, 6–4	Pilkington Glass Championships
1992	(United States) Lori McNeil	(United States) Linda Harvey Wild	6–4, 6–4	Pilkington Glass Championships
1993	(United States) Martina Navratilova (11)	(Netherlands) Miriam Oremans	2–6, 6–2, 6–3	Volkswagen Cup
1994	(United States) Meredith McGrath	(United States) Linda Harvey Wild	6–2, 6–4	Volkswagen Cup
1995	(France) Nathalie Tauziat	(United States) Chanda Rubin	3–6, 6–0, 7–5	Direct Line Insurance; International Championships
1996	(United States) Monica Seles	(United States) Mary Joe Fernández	6–0, 6–2	Direct Line Insurance; International Championships
1997	(Czech Republic) Jana Novotná vs. (Spain) Arantxa Sánchez Vicario		6–5, abandoned (rain); prize shared	Direct Line Insurance; International Championships
1998	(Czech Republic) Jana Novotná	(Spain) Arantxa Sánchez Vicario	6–1, 7–5	Direct Line Insurance; International Championships
1999	(Belarus) Natasha Zvereva	(France) Nathalie Tauziat	0–6, 7–5, 6–3	Direct Line Insurance; International Championships
2000	(France) Julie Halard-Decugis	(Belgium) Dominique Van Roost	7–6^{(7–4)}, 6–4	Direct Line Insurance; International Championships
2001	(United States) Lindsay Davenport	(Spain) Magüi Serna	6–2, 6–0	Britannic Asset Management; International Championships
2002	(United States) Chanda Rubin	(Russia) Anastasia Myskina	6–1, 6–3	Britannic Asset Management; International Championships
2003	(United States) Chanda Rubin (2)	(Spain) Conchita Martínez	6–4, 3–6, 6–4	Hastings Direct; International Championships
2004	(Russia) Svetlana Kuznetsova	(Slovakia) Daniela Hantuchová	2–6, 7–6^{(7–2)}, 6–4	Hastings Direct; International Championships
2005	(Belgium) Kim Clijsters	(Russia) Vera Dushevina	7–5, 6–0	Hastings Direct; International Championships
2006	(Belgium) Justine Henin-Hardenne	(Russia) Anastasia Myskina	4–6, 6–1, 7–6^{(7–5)}	Hastings Direct; International Championships
2007	(Belgium) Justine Henin (2)	(France) Amélie Mauresmo	7–5, 6–7^{(4–7)}, 7–6^{(7–2)}	Hastings Direct; International Championships
2008	(Poland) Agnieszka Radwańska	(Russia) Nadia Petrova	6–4, 6–7^{(11–13)}, 6–4	International Women's Open
2009	(Denmark) Caroline Wozniacki	(France) Virginie Razzano	7–6^{(7–5)}, 7–5	Aegon International
2010	(Russia) Ekaterina Makarova	(Belarus) Victoria Azarenka	7–6^{(7–5)}, 6–4	Aegon International
2011	(France) Marion Bartoli	(Czech Republic) Petra Kvitová	6–1, 4–6, 7–5	Aegon International
2012	(Austria) Tamira Paszek	(Germany) Angelique Kerber	5–7, 6–3, 7–5	Aegon International
2013	(Russia) Elena Vesnina	(United States) Jamie Hampton	6–2, 6–1	Aegon International
2014	(United States) Madison Keys	(Germany) Angelique Kerber	6–3, 3–6, 7–5	Aegon International
2015	(Switzerland) Belinda Bencic	(Poland) Agnieszka Radwańska	6–4, 4–6, 6–0	Aegon International
2016	(Slovakia) Dominika Cibulková	(Czech Republic) Karolína Plíšková	7–5, 6–3	Aegon International
2017	(Czech Republic) Karolína Plíšková	(Denmark) Caroline Wozniacki	6–4, 6–4	Aegon International
2018	(Denmark) Caroline Wozniacki (2)	(Belarus) Aryna Sabalenka	7–5, 7–6^{(7–5)}	Nature Valley International
2019	(Czech Republic) Karolína Plíšková (2)	(Germany) Angelique Kerber	6–1, 6–4	Nature Valley International
2020	Cancelled due to the coronavirus pandemic			Nature Valley International
2021	(Latvia) Jeļena Ostapenko	(Estonia) Anett Kontaveit	6–3, 6–3	Viking International
2022	(Czech Republic) Petra Kvitová	(Latvia) Jeļena Ostapenko	6–3, 6–2	Rothesay International Eastbourne
2023	(United States) Madison Keys (2)	Daria Kasatkina	6–2, 7–6^{(15–13)}	Rothesay International Eastbourne
2024	Daria Kasatkina	(Canada) Leylah Fernandez	6–3, 6–4	Rothesay International Eastbourne
↓ WTA 250 tournament ↓
2025	(Australia) Maya Joint	(Philippines) Alexandra Eala	6–4, 1–6, 7–6^{(12–10)}	Lexus Eastbourne Open
2026	(United States) Madison Keys (3)	(Germany) Tatjana Maria	7–5, 6–4	Lexus Eastbourne Open

=== Men's doubles ===
Year	Champion	Runner-up	Score
↓ ATP Tour 250 ↓
2009	(Poland) Mariusz Fyrstenberg (Poland) Marcin Matkowski	(United States) Travis Parrott (Slovakia) Filip Polášek	6–4, 6–4
2010	(Poland) Mariusz Fyrstenberg (2) (Poland) Marcin Matkowski (2)	(United Kingdom) Colin Fleming (United Kingdom) Ken Skupski	6–3, 5–7, [10–8]
2011	(Israel) Jonathan Erlich (Israel) Andy Ram	(Bulgaria) Grigor Dimitrov (Italy) Andreas Seppi	6–3, 6–3
2012	(United Kingdom) Colin Fleming (United Kingdom) Ross Hutchins	(United Kingdom) Jamie Delgado (United Kingdom) Ken Skupski	6–4, 6–3
2013	(Austria) Alexander Peya (Brazil) Bruno Soares	(United Kingdom) Colin Fleming (United Kingdom) Jonathan Marray	3–6, 6–3, [10–8]
2014	(Philippines) Treat Huey (United Kingdom) Dominic Inglot	(Austria) Alexander Peya (Brazil) Bruno Soares	7–5, 5–7, [10–8]
2015–16	Completely Cancelled without organisation		
2017	(United States) Bob Bryan (United States) Mike Bryan	(India) Rohan Bopanna (Brazil) André Sá	6–7^{(4–7)}, 6–4, [10–3]
2018	(United Kingdom) Luke Bambridge (United Kingdom) Jonny O'Mara	(United Kingdom) Ken Skupski (United Kingdom) Neal Skupski	7–5, 6–4
2019	(Colombia) Juan Sebastián Cabal (Colombia) Robert Farah	(Argentina) Máximo González (Argentina) Horacio Zeballos	3–6, 7–6^{(7–4)}, [10–6]
2020	Completely Cancelled due to the coronavirus pandemic		
2021	(Croatia) Nikola Mektić (Croatia) Mate Pavić	(United States) Rajeev Ram (United Kingdom) Joe Salisbury	6–4, 6–3
2022	(Croatia) Nikola Mektić (2) (Croatia) Mate Pavić (2)	(Netherlands) Matwé Middelkoop (Australia) Luke Saville	6–4, 6–2
2023	(Croatia) Nikola Mektić (3) (Croatia) Mate Pavić (3)	(Croatia) Ivan Dodig (United States) Austin Krajicek	6–4, 6–2
2024	(United Kingdom) Neal Skupski (New Zealand) Michael Venus	(Australia) Matthew Ebden (Australia) John Peers	4–6, 7–6^{(7–2)}, [11–9]
2025	(United Kingdom) Julian Cash (United Kingdom) Lloyd Glasspool	(Uruguay) Ariel Behar (Belgium) Joran Vliegen	6–4, 7–6^{(7–5)}
2026	(Monaco) Hugo Nys (France) Édouard Roger-Vasselin	(Argentina) Guido Andreozzi (France) Manuel Guinard	6–3, 4–6, [10–8]

=== Women's doubles ===
Year	Champion	Runner-up	Score
1975	(United States) Julie Anthony (Soviet Union) Olga Morozova	(Australia) Evonne Goolagong (United States) Peggy Michel	6–2, 6–4
1976	(United States) Chris Evert / (United States) Martina Navratilova vs. (Soviet Union) Olga Morozova / (United Kingdom) Virginia Wade		6–4, 1–1 abandoned due to rain
1977	Completely Cancelled without organisation		
1978	(United States) Chris Evert (Netherlands) Betty Stöve	(United States) Billie Jean King (United States) Martina Navratilova	6–4, 6–7, 7–5
1979	(Netherlands) Betty Stöve (2) (Australia) Wendy Turnbull	(South Africa) Ilana Kloss (United States) Betty Ann Grubb-Stuart	6–2, 6–2
1980	(United States) Kathy Jordan (United States) Anne Smith	(United States) Pam Shriver (Netherlands) Betty Stöve	6–4, 6–1
1981	(United States) Martina Navratilova (United States) Pam Shriver	(United States) Kathy Jordan (United States) Anne Smith	6–7, 6–2, 6–1
1982	(United States) Martina Navratilova (2) (United States) Pam Shriver (2)	(United States) Kathy Jordan (United States) Anne Smith	6–3, 6–4
1983	(United States) Martina Navratilova (3) (United States) Pam Shriver (3) '	(United Kingdom) Jo Durie (United Kingdom) Anne Hobbs	6–1, 6–0
1984	(United States) Martina Navratilova (4) (United States) Pam Shriver (4)	(United Kingdom) Jo Durie (United States) Ann Kiyomura	6–4, 6–2
1985	(United States) Martina Navratilova (5) (United States) Pam Shriver (5)	(United States) Kathy Jordan (Australia) Elizabeth Sayers Smylie	7–5, 6–4
1986	(United States) Martina Navratilova (6) (United States) Pam Shriver (6)	(West Germany) Claudia Kohde-Kilsch (Czechoslovakia) Helena Suková	6–2, 6–4
1987	(Soviet Union) Svetlana Parkhomenko (Soviet Union) Larisa Savchenko	(South Africa) Rosalyn Fairbank (Australia) Elizabeth Sayers Smylie	7–6^{(7–5)}, 4–6, 7–5
1988	(West Germany) Eva Pfaff (Australia) Elizabeth Sayers Smylie	(New Zealand) Belinda Cordwell (South Africa) Dinky Van Rensburg	6–3, 7–6^{(8–6)}
1989	(United States) Katrina Adams (United States) Zina Garrison	(Czechoslovakia) Jana Novotná (Czechoslovakia) Helena Suková	6–3, retired
1990	(Soviet Union) Larisa Savchenko (2) (Soviet Union) Natasha Zvereva	(United States) Patty Fendick (United States) Zina Garrison	6–4, 6–3
1991	(Soviet Union) Larisa Savchenko (3) (Soviet Union) Natasha Zvereva (2)	(United States) Gigi Fernández (Czechoslovakia) Jana Novotná	2–6, 6–4, 6–4
1992	(Czechoslovakia) Jana Novotná (Latvia) Larisa Neiland	(United States) Mary Joe Fernández (United States) Zina Garrison	6–0, 6–3
1993	(United States) Gigi Fernández (Belarus) Natasha Zvereva (3)	(Czech Republic) Jana Novotná (Latvia) Larisa Neiland	2–6, 7–5, 6–1
1994	(United States) Gigi Fernández (2) (Belarus) Natasha Zvereva (4)	(Argentina) Inés Gorrochategui (Czech Republic) Helena Suková	6–7^{(4–7)}, 6–4, 6–3
1995	(Czech Republic) Jana Novotná (2) (Spain) Arantxa Sánchez Vicario	(United States) Gigi Fernández (Belarus) Natasha Zvereva	0–6, 6–3, 6–4
1996	(Czech Republic) Jana Novotná (3) (Spain) Arantxa Sánchez Vicario (2)	(United States) Rosalyn Fairbank Nideffer (United States) Pam Shriver	4–6, 7–5, 6–4
1997	(United States) Nicole Arendt / (Netherlands) Manon Bollegraf vs. (United States) Lori McNeil / (Czech Republic) Helena Suková		Cancelled for safety reasons
1998	(South Africa) Mariaan de Swardt (Czech Republic) Jana Novotná (4)	(Spain) Arantxa Sánchez Vicario (Belarus) Natasha Zvereva	6–1, 6–3
1999	(Switzerland) Martina Hingis (Russia) Anna Kournikova	(Czech Republic) Jana Novotná (Belarus) Natasha Zvereva	6–4, retired
2000	(Japan) Ai Sugiyama (France) Nathalie Tauziat	(United States) Lisa Raymond (Australia) Rennae Stubbs	2–6, 6–3, 7–6^{(7–3)}
2001	(United States) Lisa Raymond (Australia) Rennae Stubbs	(Zimbabwe) Cara Black (Russia) Elena Likhovtseva	6–2, 6–2
2002	(United States) Lisa Raymond (2) (Australia) Rennae Stubbs (2)	(Zimbabwe) Cara Black (Russia) Elena Likhovtseva	6–7^{(5–7)}, 7–6^{(8–6)}, 6–2
2003	(United States) Lindsay Davenport (United States) Lisa Raymond (3)	(United States) Jennifer Capriati (Spain) Magüi Serna	6–3, 6–2
2004	(Australia) Alicia Molik (Spain) Magüi Serna	(Russia) Svetlana Kuznetsova (Russia) Elena Likhovtseva	6–4, 6–4
2005	(United States) Lisa Raymond (4) (Australia) Rennae Stubbs (3)	(Russia) Elena Likhovtseva (Russia) Vera Zvonareva	6–3, 7–5
2006	(Russia) Svetlana Kuznetsova (France) Amélie Mauresmo	(South Africa) Liezel Huber (United States) Martina Navratilova	6–2, 6–4
2007	(United States) Lisa Raymond (5) (Australia) Samantha Stosur	(Czech Republic) Květa Peschke (Australia) Rennae Stubbs	6–7^{(5–7)}, 6–4, 6–3
2008	(Zimbabwe) Cara Black (United States) Liezel Huber	(Czech Republic) Květa Peschke (Australia) Rennae Stubbs	2–6, 6–0, [10–8]
2009	(Uzbekistan) Akgul Amanmuradova (Japan) Ai Sugiyama (2)	(Australia) Samantha Stosur (Australia) Rennae Stubbs	6–4, 6–3
2010	(United States) Lisa Raymond (6) (Australia) Rennae Stubbs (4)	(Czech Republic) Květa Peschke (Slovenia) Katarina Srebotnik	6–2, 2–6, [13–11]
2011	(Czech Republic) Květa Peschke (Slovenia) Katarina Srebotnik	(United States) Liezel Huber (United States) Lisa Raymond	6–3, 6–0
2012	(Spain) Nuria Llagostera Vives (Spain) María José Martínez Sánchez	(United States) Liezel Huber (United States) Lisa Raymond	6–4, retired
2013	(Russia) Nadia Petrova (Slovenia) Katarina Srebotnik (2)	(Romania) Monica Niculescu (Czech Republic) Klára Zakopalová	6–3, 6–3
2014	(Chinese Taipei) Chan Hao-ching (Chinese Taipei) Chan Yung-jan	(Switzerland) Martina Hingis (Italy) Flavia Pennetta	6–3, 5–7, [10–7]
2015	(France) Caroline Garcia (Slovenia) Katarina Srebotnik (3)	(Chinese Taipei) Chan Yung-jan (China) Zheng Jie	7–6^{(7–5)}, 6–2
2016	(Croatia) Darija Jurak (Australia) Anastasia Rodionova	(Chinese Taipei) Chan Hao-ching (Chinese Taipei) Chan Yung-jan	5–7, 7–6^{(7–4)}, [10–6]
2017	(Chinese Taipei) Chan Yung-jan (2) (Switzerland) Martina Hingis (2)	(Australia) Ashleigh Barty (Australia) Casey Dellacqua	6–3, 7–5
2018	(Canada) Gabriela Dabrowski (China) Xu Yifan	(Romania) Irina-Camelia Begu (Romania) Mihaela Buzărnescu	6–3, 7–5
2019	(Chinese Taipei) Chan Hao-ching (2) (Chinese Taipei) Latisha Chan (3)	(Belgium) Kirsten Flipkens (United States) Bethanie Mattek-Sands	2–6, 6–3, [10–6]
2020	Completely Cancelled due to the coronavirus pandemic		
2021	(Japan) Shuko Aoyama (Japan) Ena Shibahara	(United States) Nicole Melichar (Netherlands) Demi Schuurs	6–1, 6–4
2022	(Serbia) Aleksandra Krunić (Poland) Magda Linette	(Ukraine) Lyudmyla Kichenok (Latvia) Jeļena Ostapenko	walkover
2023	(United States) Desirae Krawczyk (Netherlands) Demi Schuurs	(United States) Nicole Melichar-Martinez (Australia) Ellen Perez	6–2, 6–4
2024	(Ukraine) Lyudmyla Kichenok (Latvia) Jeļena Ostapenko	(Canada) Gabriela Dabrowski (New Zealand) Erin Routliffe	5–7, 7–6^{(7–2)}, [10–8]
↓ WTA 250 tournament ↓
2025	(Czech Republic) Marie Bouzková (Kazakhstan) Anna Danilina	(Chinese Taipei) Hsieh Su-wei (Australia) Maya Joint	6–4, 7–5
2026	(Canada) Gabriela Dabrowski (2) (Brazil) Luisa Stefani	(Czech Republic) Jesika Malečková (Czech Republic) Miriam Škoch	6–1, 6–4

== Titles by country ==
=== Men's singles ===
Country	Winner	First title	Last title
United States (USA)	5	2012	2025
Spain (ESP)	2	2013	2014
Russia (RUS)	1	2009	2009
France (FRA)	1	2010	2010
Italy (ITA)	1	2011	2011
Serbia (SRB)	1	2017	2017
Germany (GER)	1	2018	2018
Australia (AUS)	1	2021	2021
Argentina (ARG)	1	2023	2023
Belgium (BEL)	1	2026	2026

=== Women's singles ===
Country	Winner	First title	Last title
United States (USA)	24	1974	2026
Czech Republic (CZE)	5	1997	2022
France (FRA)	3	1995	2011
Russia (RUS)	3	2004	2013
Belgium (BEL)	3	2005	2007
Denmark (DEN)	2	2009	2018
Great Britain (GBR)	1	1975	1975
Czechoslovakia (TCH)	1	1987	1987
Spain (SPA)	1	1997	1997
Belarus (BLR)	1	1999	1999
Poland (POL)	1	2008	2008
Austria (AUT)	1	2012	2012
Switzerland (SUI)	1	2015	2015
Slovakia (SVK)	1	2016	2016
Latvia (LAT)	1	2021	2021
Australia (AUS)	1	2025	2025

=== Men's doubles ===
Country	Winner	First title	Last title
Great Britain (GBR)	5	2012	2025
Croatia (CRO)	3	2021	2023
Poland (POL)	2	2009	2010
Austria (AUT)	1	2013	2013
Brazil (BRA)	1	2013	2013
Colombia (COL)	1	2019	2019
Israel (ISR)	1	2011	2011
New Zealand (NZL)	1	2024	2024
Philippines (PHI)	1	2014	2014
United States (USA)	1	2017	2017
Monaco (MON)	1	2026	2026
France (FRA)	1	2026	2026

=== Women's doubles ===
Country	Winner	First title	Last title
United States (USA)	33	1975	2023
Australia (AUS)	9	1979	2016
Soviet Union (URS)	8	1975	1991
Czech Republic (CZE)	6	1995	2025
Spain (SPA)	5	1995	2012
Netherlands (NED)	4	1978	2023
Japan (JPN)	4	2000	2021
Chinese Taipei (TPE)	4	2014	2019
Russia (RUS)	3	1999	2013
France (FRA)	3	2000	2015
Slovenia (SLO)	3	2011	2015
Belarus (BLR)	2	1993	1994
Switzerland (SUI)	2	1999	2017
Latvia (LAT)	2	1992	2024
Canada (CAN)	2	2018	2026
Great Britain (GBR)	1	1976	1976
West Germany (FRG)	1	1988	1988
Czechoslovakia (TCH)	1	1992	1992
South Africa (RSA)	1	1998	1998
Zimbabwe (ZIM)	1	2008	2008
Uzbekistan (UZB)	1	2009	2009
Croatia (CRO)	1	2016	2016
China (CHN)	1	2018	2018
Ukraine (UKR)	1	2024	2024
Kazakhstan (KAZ)	1	2025	2025
Brazil (BRA)	1	2026	2026

== See also ==
- Sport in Sussex
