= Magüi Serna =

Spanish tennis player (born 1979)

- Country (sports): Spain
- Residence: Las Palmas
- Born: 1 March 1979 (age 47) Las Palmas
- Height: 1.67 m (5 ft 5 1/2 in)
- Turned pro: 1996
- Retired: 2006
- Plays: Left-handed (one-handed backhand)
- Prize money: $2,065,291

Singles
- Career record: 329–256
- Career titles: 3 WTA, 6 ITF
- Highest ranking: No. 19 (12 January 2004)

Grand Slam singles results
- Australian Open: 3R (1997, 2002)
- French Open: 4R (1998, 2003)
- Wimbledon: QF (2000)
- US Open: 4R (1997, 2000)

Doubles
- Career record: 116–144
- Career titles: 2 WTA, 1 ITF
- Highest ranking: No. 25 (5 July 2004)

Grand Slam doubles results
- Australian Open: SF (2002)
- French Open: 3R (2000, 2002)
- Wimbledon: 3R (2001)
- US Open: 2R (2000, 2001)

Team competitions
- Fed Cup: 10–10

María Luisa ("Magüi") Serna Barrera (Spanish pronunciation: [maˈɾi.a ˈlwisa ˈmaɣwi ˈseɾna βaˈreɾa]; (Note: In isolation, Barrera is pronounced [baˈreɾa].) born 1 March 1979) is a former tennis player from Spain.

She started competing on the ITF Circuit as from 1993, and joined the WTA Tour in 1996. On 12 January 2004, she reached her career-high singles ranking of world No. 19.

Serna won three WTA Tour singles titles at the 2002 Estoril Open, 2003 Estoril Open and the 2003 Budapest Grand Prix.

She produced an upset by defeating Justine Henin in the 2001 Scottsdale tournament.

== WTA career finals ==
=== Singles: 6 (3–3) ===
Legend
Grand Slam (0–0)
Tier I (0–0)
Tier II (0–1)
Tier III (0–0)
Tier IV & V (3–2)

Result	W-L	Date	Tournament	Surface	Opponent	Score
Loss	0–1	Apr 2001	Porto, Portugal	Clay	(Spain) Arantxa Sánchez Vicario	3–6, 1–6
Loss	0–2	Jun 2001	Eastbourne, UK	Grass	(United States) Lindsay Davenport	2–6, 0–6
Loss	0–3	Apr 2002	Porto, Portugal	Clay	(Spain) Ángeles Montolio	1–6, 6–2, 5–7
Win	1–3	Apr 2002	Estoril, Portugal	Clay	(Germany) Anca Barna	6–4, 6–2
Win	2–3	Apr 2003	Estoril, Portugal	Clay	(Germany) Julia Schruff	6–4, 6–1
Win	3–3	Apr 2003	Budapest, Hungary	Clay	(Australia) Alicia Molik	3–6, 7–5, 6–4

=== Doubles: 6 (2–4) ===
Result	W-L	Date	Tournament	Surface	Partner	Opponents	Score
Loss	0–1	May 2000	Rome, Italy	Clay	(Spain) Arantxa Sánchez Vicario	(United States) Lisa Raymond (Australia) Rennae Stubbs	3–6, 6–4, 2–6
Win	1–1	Jul 2001	Knokke-Heist, Belgium	Clay	(Spain) Virginia Ruano Pascual	(Romania) Ruxandra Dragomir (Romania) Andreea Vanc	6–4, 6–3
Loss	1–2	Apr 2002	Porto, Portugal	Clay	(Netherlands) Kristie Boogert	(Zimbabwe) Cara Black (Kazakhstan) Irina Selyutina	6–7^{(6–8)}, 4–6
Loss	1–3	Jun 2003	Eastbourne, United Kingdom	Grass	(United States) Jennifer Capriati	(United States) Lindsay Davenport (United States) Lisa Raymond	3–6, 2–6
Loss	1–4	Aug 2003	New Haven, United States	Hard	(Australia) Alicia Molik	(Spain) Virginia Ruano Pascual (Argentina) Paola Suárez	6–7^{(6–8)}, 3–6
Win	2–4	Jun 2004	Eastbourne, United Kingdom	Grass	(Australia) Alicia Molik	(Russia) Svetlana Kuznetsova (Russia) Elena Likhovtseva	6–4, 6–4

== ITF Circuit finals ==
$25,000 tournaments
$10,000 tournaments

=== Singles (6–5) ===
Result	No.	Date	Tournament	Surface	Opponent	Score
Win	1.	3 April 1994	Gaborone, Botswana	Hard	(United Kingdom) Shirli-Ann Siddall	6–3, 6–4
Win	2.	10 April 1994	Harare, Zimbabwe	Hard	(United Kingdom) Shirli-Ann Siddall	6–4, 6–2
Loss	1.	4 July 1994	Felixstowe, United Kingdom	Grass	(Russia) Tatiana Panova	7–5, 3–6, 3–6
Loss	2.	19 March 1995	Zaragoza, Spain	Clay	(Spain) Virginia Ruano Pascual	6–2, 6–7, 2–6
Loss	3.	14 August 1995	Koksijde, Belgium	Clay	(France) Sarah Pitkowski	1–6, 3–6
Loss	4.	21 August 1995	Brussels, Belgium	Clay	(Spain) Conchita Martínez Granados	0–6, 4–6
Win	3.	3 December 1995	Mallorca, Spain	Clay (i)	(Hungary) Kira Nagy	6–4, 6–3
Win	4.	28 July 1996	Valladolid, Spain	Hard	(Israel) Hila Rosen	6–3, 6–1
Win	5.	18 August 1996	Wahlscheid, Germany	Clay	(Czech Republic) Alena Vašková	6–2, 6–3
Win	6.	25 August 1996	Athens, Greece	Clay	(Argentina) Mariana Díaz Oliva	5–7, 6–3, 6–2
Loss	5.	11 March 2006	Telde, Spain	Clay	(France) Aravane Rezaï	4–6, 1–6

=== Doubles (1–1) ===
Result	No.	Date	Tournament	Surface	Partner	Opponents	Score
Loss	1.	27 March 1994	Nairobi, Kenya	Hard	(Germany) Sybille Seyfried	(Zimbabwe) Cara Black (South Africa) Nannie de Villiers	2–6, 2–6
Win	1.	3 April 1994	Gaborone, Botswana	Hard	(Netherlands) Amanda Hopmans	(Austria) Evelyn Fauth (Czech Republic) Radka Surová	6–3, 6–1

== Grand Slam singles performance timeline ==
Key
W	F	SF	QF	#R	RR	Q#	DNQ	A	NH

(W) winner; (F) finalist; (SF) semifinalist; (QF) quarterfinalist; (#R) rounds 4, 3, 2, 1; (RR) round-robin stage; (Q#) qualification round; (DNQ) did not qualify; (A) absent; (NH) not held; (SR) strike rate (events won / competed); (W–L) win–loss record.

Tournament	1997	1998	1999	2000	2001	2002	2003	2004	2005	W–L
Australian Open	3R	2R	2R	2R	2R	3R	2R	1R	1R	9–9
French Open	3R	4R	1R	3R	2R	1R	4R	2R	A	12–8
Wimbledon	3R	4R	1R	QF	1R	1R	2R	3R	A	12–8
US Open	4R	1R	3R	4R	1R	1R	2R	2R	A	10–8
Win–loss	9–4	7–4	3–4	10–4	2–4	2–4	6–4	4–4	0–1	43–33
