= 2008 Western & Southern Financial Group Masters and Women's Open =

2008 Western & Southern Financial Group Masters and Western & Southern Financial Group Women's Open
- Date: July 26 – August 3 (men); August 9–17 (women)
- Edition: 107th
- Category: ATP Masters Series (men); Tier III Series (women)
- Surface: Hard / outdoor
- Location: Mason, United States
- Venue: Lindner Family Tennis Center

Champions

Men's singles
- (United Kingdom) Andy Murray

Women's singles
- (Russia) Nadia Petrova

Men's doubles
- (United States) Bob Bryan / (United States) Mike Bryan

Women's doubles
- (Russia) Maria Kirilenko / (Russia) Nadia Petrova
- Western & Southern Financial Group Masters Western & Southern Financial Group Women's Open

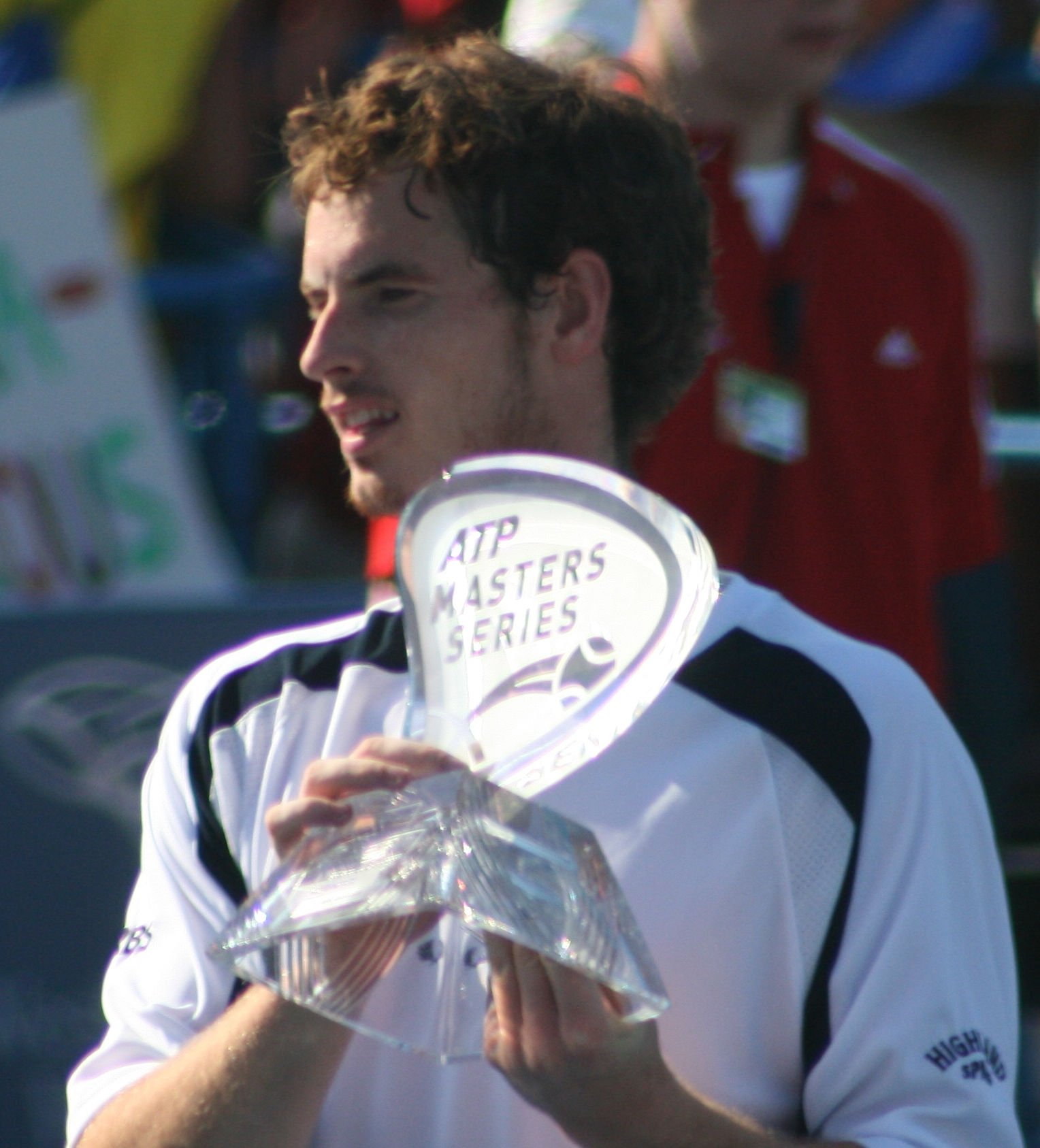
Men's singles champion Andy Murray being presented with the Masters trophy

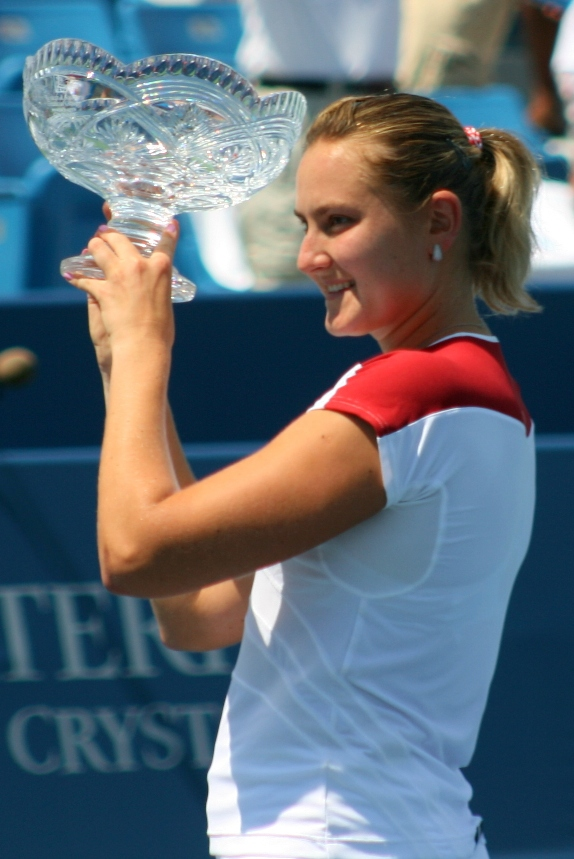
Nadia Petrova won the title, beating Nathalie Dechy of France

The 2008 Cincinnati Masters, also known as the Western & Southern Financial Group Masters and Women's Open for sponsorship reasons, was a tennis tournament played on outdoor hard courts. It was the 107th edition of the Cincinnati Masters, and was part of the ATP Masters Series of the 2008 ATP Tour, and of the Tier III Series of the 2008 WTA Tour. Both the men's and the women's events took place at the Lindner Family Tennis Center in Mason, near Cincinnati, Ohio, United States, with the men playing from July 26 through August 3, 2008, and the women from August 9 through August 17, 2008.

The men's field was led by world No. 1, French Open and Wimbledon runner-up and Cincinnati Masters defending champion Roger Federer, ATP No. 2, French Open, Wimbledon and Canada Masters winner Rafael Nadal, and Australian Open titlist Novak Djokovic. Other top seeded players were ATP No. 4, Pörtschach and Warsaw titlist Nikolay Davydenko, Valencia and s'Hertogenbosch winner David Ferrer, Andy Roddick, James Blake and Andy Murray.

The women's draw featured Paris, Eastbourne and Montreal semifinalist, Standford finalist Marion Bartoli, Eastbourne runner-up and Wimbledon quarterfinalist Nadia Petrova, and Estoril, Barcelona winner Maria Kirilenko. Also competing were Strasbourg finalist, French Open and Wimbledon mixed doubles runner-up Katarina Srebotnik, Amelia Island quarterfinalist Amélie Mauresmo, Aleksandra Wozniak, Ekaterina Makarova and Tamira Paszek.

== Points and prize money ==
=== Points distribution ===
Event	W	F	SF	QF	R16	R32	R64	Q	Q2	Q1
Men's singles	500	350	225	125	75	35	5	15	8	0
Men's doubles	500	350	225	125	75	35	—N/a	—N/a	—N/a	—N/a
Women's singles	140	100	65	35	20	1	—N/a	4	3	1
Women's doubles	140	100	65	35	1	—N/a	—N/a	—N/a	—N/a	—N/a

Men's singles qualifiers received 15 additional ranking points. A player who lost in the final qualifying round received eight points, while a first-round qualifying loss received no points. Women's singles qualifiers received four points; the qualifying-round losers received three or one point, depending on the round reached.

=== Prize money ===
Event	W	F	SF	QF	Round of 16	Round of 32	Round of 64
Men's singles	$420,000	$210,000	$105,000	$51,000	$26,200	$17,250	$8,500
Women's singles	$28,000	$15,000	$8,025	$4,340	$2,295	$1,300	—N/a
Men's doubles*	$130,000	$75,000	$34,200	$14,100	$7,600	$3,500	—N/a
Women's doubles*	$8,000	$4,250	$2,250	$1,200	$650	—N/a	—N/a

*per team

== Finals ==
=== Men's singles ===
(United Kingdom) Andy Murray defeated (Serbia) Novak Djokovic 7–6^{(7–4)}, 7–6^{(7–5)}

- It was Murray's 3rd title of the year, and his 6th overall. It was his 1st career Masters title.

=== Women's singles ===
(Russia) Nadia Petrova defeated (France) Nathalie Dechy 6–2, 6–1

- It was Petrova's 1st title of the year, and her 8th overall.

=== Men's doubles ===
(United States) Bob Bryan / (United States) Mike Bryan defeated (Israel) Jonathan Erlich / (Israel) Andy Ram 4–6, 7–6^{(7–2)}, [10–7]

=== Women's doubles ===
(Russia) Maria Kirilenko / (Russia) Nadia Petrova defeated (Chinese Taipei) Su-wei Hsieh / (Russia) Yaroslava Shvedova 6–3, 4–6, [10–8]
