= 2008 Ordina Open – Women's doubles =

Women's doubles
- 2008 Ordina Open

Final
- Champions: (New Zealand) Marina Erakovic (Netherlands) Michaëlla Krajicek
- Runners-up: (Latvia) Līga Dekmeijere (Germany) Angelique Kerber
- Score: 6–3, 6–2

Events
Singles	men	women
Doubles	men	women
← 2007 ·	Ordina Open	· 2009 →

Yung-jan Chan and Chia-jung Chuang were the defending champions, but lost in the quarterfinals to Andreea Ehritt-Vanc and Tamarine Tanasugarn.

Marina Erakovic and Michaëlla Krajicek won in the final 6–3, 6–2, against Līga Dekmeijere and Angelique Kerber.

== Seeds ==
The top seeds receive a bye into the second round.

1. (Chinese Taipei) Yung-jan Chan / (Chinese Taipei) Chia-jung Chuang (quarterfinals)
2. (Russia) Maria Kirilenko / (Italy) Flavia Pennetta (first round)
3. (Ukraine) Mariya Koryttseva / (Russia) Anastassia Rodionova (quarterfinals)
4. (Czech Republic) Iveta Benešová / (Czech Republic) Gabriela Navrátilová (first round)

== Draw ==
=== Key ===
- Q = Qualifier
- WC = Wild card
- LL = Lucky loser
- Alt = Alternate
- SE = Special exempt
- PR = Protected ranking
- ITF = ITF entry
- JE = Junior exempt
- w/o = Walkover
- r = Retired
- d = Defaulted
- SR = Special ranking

=== Draw ===
First round
(Romania) A Ehritt-Vanc (Thailand) T Tanasugarn	6	6
(Germany) N Hassinger (Germany) AP Schäfer	1	3
4	(Czech Republic) I Benešová (Czech Republic) G Navrátilová	6	6^{5}	[4]
(Netherlands) A Rus (Netherlands) N Thijssen	4	7	[10]
(New Zealand) M Erakovic (Netherlands) M Krajicek	6	6
(South Africa) K Anderson (United States) R Stephenson	2	1
(Latvia) L Dekmeijere (Germany) A Kerber	6	7
(Germany) S Lisicki (Germany) J Wöhr	3	5
(Belgium) D Feys (Croatia) M Lučić	2	6	[10]
3	(Ukraine) M Koryttseva (Russia) A Rodionova	6	4	[12]
(Sweden) S Arvidsson (United Kingdom) A Keothavong	7	6
(Spain) A Parra Santonja (France) C Pin	6^{5}	3
(France) S Lefèvre (France) A Védy	7
2	(Russia) M Kirilenko (Italy) F Pennetta	5	r

Quarterfinals
1	(Chinese Taipei) Y-j Chan (Chinese Taipei) C-j Chuang	6	4	[7]
(Romania) A Ehritt-Vanc (Thailand) T Tanasugarn	3	6	[10]
(Netherlands) A Rus (Netherlands) N Thijssen	2	1
(New Zealand) M Erakovic (Netherlands) M Krajicek	6	6
(Latvia) L Dekmeijere (Germany) A Kerber	7	6
3	(Ukraine) M Koryttseva (Russia) A Rodionova	6^{1}	2
(Sweden) S Arvidsson (United Kingdom) A Keothavong	2	4
(France) S Lefèvre (France) A Védy	6	6

Semifinals
(Romania) A Ehritt-Vanc (Thailand) T Tanasugarn
(New Zealand) M Erakovic (Netherlands) M Krajicek	w/o
(Latvia) L Dekmeijere (Germany) A Kerber	6	6
(France) S Lefèvre (France) A Védy	4	4

Final
(New Zealand) M Erakovic (Netherlands) M Krajicek	6	6
(Latvia) L Dekmeijere (Germany) A Kerber	3	2
