= 2008 Ordina Open – Men's singles =

Men's singles
- 2008 Ordina Open

Final
- Champion: (Spain) David Ferrer
- Runner-up: (France) Marc Gicquel
- Score: 6–4, 6–2

Details
- Draw: 32 (4 Q / 3 WC )
- Seeds: 8

Events
| Singles | men | women |
| Doubles | men | women |
| ← 2007 · | Ordina Open | · 2009 → |

The 2008 Ordina Open men's singles was one of the competitions of the 2008 Ordina Open tennis tournament held in Rosmalen, Netherlands. The event was held from 15 through 21 June and comprised a draw of 32 players, of which eight were seeded. Four players gained entry through the qualification tournament and additionally, three players received a wild card for direct admission into the draw.

Ivan Ljubičić was the defending champion of the men's singles tennis event at the Rosmalen Grass Court Championships, but lost in the second round to Viktor Troicki.

First-seeded David Ferrer won in the final 6–4, 6–2, against unseeded Marc Gicquel and earned €59,100 first-prize money as well as 175 ranking points.

== Seeds ==
1. (Spain) David Ferrer (champion)
2. (France) Richard Gasquet (second round)
3. (Finland) Jarkko Nieminen (withdrew due to a right heel injury)
4. (Croatia) Ivan Ljubičić (second round)
5. (Russia) Igor Andreev (second round)
6. (Croatia) Mario Ančić (quarterfinals)
7. (Argentina) Guillermo Cañas (semifinals)
8. (France) Fabrice Santoro (first round)

== Draw ==
=== Key ===
- Q = Qualifier
- WC = Wild card
- LL = Lucky loser
- Alt = Alternate
- SE = Special exempt
- PR = Protected ranking
- ITF = ITF entry
- JE = Junior exempt
- w/o = Walkover
- r = Retired
- d = Defaulted
- SR = Special ranking

=== Finals ===
Semifinals
1 | (Spain) David Ferrer | 7 | 6
(Argentina) Juan Martín del Potro | 6^{4} | 1
7 | (Argentina) Guillermo Cañas | 6 | 0 | 4
(France) Marc Gicquel | 3 | 6 | 6

Final
1 | (Spain) David Ferrer | 6 | 6
(France) Marc Gicquel | 4 | 2

=== Top half ===
First round
1 | (Spain) D Ferrer | 6 | 6
WC | (Netherlands) J Huta Galung | 2 | 3
Q | (Italy) M Dell'Acqua | 7 | 6
(Italy) F Fognini | 6^{4} | 2
(Belgium) S Darcis | 7 | 6
(France) F Serra | 5 | 3
(Czech Republic) I Minář | 1 | 6^{0}
6 | (Croatia) M Ančić | 6 | 7
Q | (Germany) B Becker | 3 | 6 | 4
(France) A Clément | 6 | 3 | 6
(Belgium) K Vliegen | 0 | 0 | r
(Spain) M Granollers | 6 | 1
(Germany) R Schüttler | 6^{4} | 6 | 6
(Germany) M Berrer | 7 | 4 | 4
(Argentina) JM del Potro | 6 | 6
8 | (France) F Santoro | 3 | 1

Second round
1 | (Spain) D Ferrer | 6 | 7
Q | (Italy) M Dell'Acqua | 2 | 6^{3}
(Belgium) S Darcis | 2 | 4
6 | (Croatia) M Ančić | 6 | 6
(France) A Clément | 6^{6} | 6 | 6
(Spain) M Granollers | 7 | 3 | 3
(Germany) R Schüttler | 6^{3} | 6^{5}
(Argentina) JM del Potro | 7 | 7

Quarterfinals
1 | (Spain) D Ferrer | 6 | 7
6 | (Croatia) M Ančić | 4 | 6^{4}
(France) A Clément | 6 | 3 | 1
(Argentina) JM del Potro | 2 | 6 | 6

Semifinals
1 | (Spain) D Ferrer | 7 | 6
(Argentina) JM del Potro | 6^{4} | 1

=== Bottom half ===
First round
7 | (Argentina) G Cañas | 5 | 6 | 6
(Germany) M Zverev | 7 | 3 | 3
WC | (Netherlands) M Verkerk | 7 | 6^{2} | 4
Q | (India) R Bopanna | 6^{8} | 7 | 6
(Germany) D Gremelmayr | 3 | 5
Q | (Serbia) V Troicki | 6 | 7
(Netherlands) R Haase | 3 | 6^{5}
4 | (Croatia) I Ljubičić | 6 | 7
5 | (Russia) I Andreev | 6 | 6
WC | (Bulgaria) G Dimitrov | 1 | 3
(Romania) V Hănescu | 7 | 2 | 4
(Austria) J Melzer | 6^{11} | 6 | 6
(France) M Gicquel | 6 | 6
LL | (Netherlands) M Middelkoop | 4 | 1
(Belgium) O Rochus | 2 | 6^{3}
2 | (France) R Gasquet | 6 | 7

Second round
7 | (Argentina) G Cañas | 6 | 6
Q | (India) R Bopanna | 2 | 4
Q | (Serbia) V Troicki | 5 | 6 | 7
4 | (Croatia) I Ljubičić | 7 | 4 | 6^{5}
5 | (Russia) I Andreev | 4 | 6 | 1
(Austria) J Melzer | 6 | 1 | 6
(France) M Gicquel | 7 | 7
2 | (France) R Gasquet | 5 | 6^{6}

Quarterfinals
7 | (Argentina) G Cañas | 6 | 6
Q | (Serbia) V Troicki | 2 | 2
(Austria) J Melzer | 3 | 4
(France) M Gicquel | 6 | 6

Semifinals
7 | (Argentina) G Cañas | 6 | 0 | 4
(France) M Gicquel | 3 | 6 | 6
