= 2007 Ordina Open – Men's doubles =

Men's doubles
- 2007 Ordina Open

Final
- Champions: (South Africa) Jeff Coetzee (Netherlands) Rogier Wassen
- Runners-up: (Czech Republic) Martin Damm (India) Leander Paes
- Score: 3–6, 7–6^{(7–5)}, [12–10]

Events
Singles	men	women
Doubles	men	women
← 2006 ·	Ordina Open	· 2008 →

Jeff Coetzee and Rogier Wassen were able to emerge victorious at the 2007 Ordina Open Men's Doubles Competition.

== Seeds ==
1. (Czech Republic) Martin Damm / (India) Leander Paes (final)
2. (Czech Republic) Lukáš Dlouhý / (Czech Republic) Pavel Vízner (first round)
3. (South Africa) Jeff Coetzee / (Netherlands) Rogier Wassen (champions)
4. (Czech Republic) Jaroslav Levinský / (Czech Republic) David Škoch (first round)

=== Key ===
- Q = Qualifier
- WC = Wild card
- LL = Lucky loser
- Alt = Alternate
- SE = Special exempt
- PR = Protected ranking
- ITF = ITF entry
- JE = Junior exempt
- w/o = Walkover
- r = Retired
- d = Defaulted
- SR = Special ranking

== Draw ==
First round
1	(Czech Republic) M Damm (India) L Paes	6^{1}	7	[13]
(France) J Benneteau (France) N Devilder	7^{7}	5	[11]
(South Africa) C Haggard (Poland) M Matkowski	3	3
(Germany) B Becker (Denmark) K Pless	6	6
4	(Czech Republic) J Levinský (Czech Republic) D Škoch	3	6	[10]
(Germany) M Kohlmann (Sweden) R Lindstedt	6	3	[12]
(Poland) M Fyrstenberg (Czech Republic) P Pála	6^{5}	6^{4}
(Switzerland) Y Allegro (United States) J Thomas	7^{7}	7^{4}
(Czech Republic) T Cibulec (Australia) J Kerr	6	7
(Argentina) G Cañas (Argentina) JI Chela	3	5
(Belgium) O Rochus (Belgium) K Vliegen	3	1
3	(South Africa) J Coetzee (Netherlands) R Wassen	6	6
WC	(Netherlands) T de Bakker (Netherlands) P Wessels	7	3	[10]
A	(United States) H Armando (Argentina) S Roitman	5	6	[7]
(Latvia) E Gulbis (Croatia) I Lubičić	7^{7}	7
2	(Czech Republic) L Dlouhý (Czech Republic) P Vízner	6^{0}	5

Quarterfinals
1	(Czech Republic) M Damm (India) L Paes	6	6
(Germany) B Becker (Denmark) K Pless	4	4
(Germany) M Kohlmann (Sweden) R Lindstedt	6	3	[14]
(Switzerland) Y Allegro (United States) J Thomas	4	6	[12]
(Czech Republic) T Cibulec (Australia) J Kerr	4	5
3	(South Africa) J Coetzee (Netherlands) R Wassen	6	7
WC	(Netherlands) T de Bakker (Netherlands) P Wessels
(Latvia) E Gulbis (Croatia) I Lubičić	w/o

Semifinals
1	(Czech Republic) M Damm (India) L Paes	6	6
(Germany) M Kohlmann (Sweden) R Lindstedt	2	3
3	(South Africa) J Coetzee (Netherlands) R Wassen	6	6
(Latvia) E Gulbis (Croatia) I Lubičić	2	4

Finals
1	(Czech Republic) M Damm (India) L Paes	6	6^{5}	[10]
3	(South Africa) J Coetzee (Netherlands) R Wassen	3	7^{7}	[12]
