= 2007 Ordina Open – Men's singles =

Men's singles
- 2007 Ordina Open

Final
- Champion: (Croatia) Ivan Ljubičić
- Runner-up: (Netherlands) Peter Wessels
- Score: 7–6^{(7–5)}, 4–6, 7–6^{(7–4)}

Details
- Draw: 32 (4 Q / 2 WC )
- Seeds: 8

Events
Singles	men	women
Doubles	men	women
← 2006 ·	Ordina Open	· 2008 →

Ivan Ljubičić defeated Peter Wessels 7–6^{(7–5)}, 4–6, 7–6^{(7–4)} to win the 2007 Ordina Open singles event.

== Seeds ==
1. (Spain) Tommy Robredo (quarterfinals)
2. (Croatia) Ivan Ljubičić (champion)
3. (Argentina) Guillermo Cañas (second round)
4. (Cyprus) ~~Marcos Baghdatis~~ (withdrew)
5. (Spain) Juan Carlos Ferrero (first round)
6. (Argentina) Juan Ignacio Chela (first round)
7. (Germany) Philipp Kohlschreiber (first round)
8. (France) Marc Gicquel (first round)

== Draws ==
=== Key ===
- Q = Qualifier
- WC = Wild card
- LL = Lucky loser
- Alt = Alternate
- ITF = ITF entry
- PR = Protected ranking
- SR = Special ranking
- SE = Special exempt
- JE = Junior exempt
- JR = Junior Accelerator Programme entrant
- CO = College Accelerator Programme entrant
- NG = Next Gen Accelerator Program entrant
- w/o = Walkover
- r = Retired
- d = Defaulted

=== Finals ===
Semifinals					Finals
Q	(Netherlands) P Wessels	7	7
Q	(France) A Dupuis	6^{5}	6^{3}		Q	(Netherlands) P Wessels	6^{5}	6	6^{4}
	(France) J Benneteau	6^{1}	6	4	2	(Croatia) I Ljubičić	7	4	7
2	(Croatia) I Ljubičić	7	3	6

=== Section 1 ===
First round
1	(Spain) T Robredo	6	7
Q	(Netherlands) M Koning	4	6^{4}
(France) F Santoro	3	1^{r}
(Belgium) K Vliegen	6	1
(France) N Devilder	4	3
Q	(Netherlands) P Wessels	6	6
(Argentina) C Berlocq	2	6	6
5	(Spain) JC Ferrero	6	3	2
LL	(Switzerland) Y Allegro	7	3	6
(Denmark) K Pless	6^{4}	6	4
(Germany) B Becker	6	7
(Belgium) O Rochus	3	6^{4}
WC	(Netherlands) T de Bakker	5	6^{1}
Q	(France) A Dupuis	7	7
(Argentina) S Roitman	6
7	(Germany) P Kohlschreiber	2	r

Second round
1	(Spain) T Robredo	6	6^{3}	6
(Belgium) K Vliegen	4	7	3
Q	(Netherlands) P Wessels	6	7
(Argentina) C Berlocq	2	6^{3}
LL	(Switzerland) Y Allegro	4	6^{6}
(Germany) B Becker	6	7
Q	(France) A Dupuis	6	7
(Argentina) S Roitman	4	6^{2}

Quarterfinals
1	(Spain) T Robredo	3	3
Q	(Netherlands) P Wessels	6	6
(Germany) B Becker	4	6^{2}
Q	(France) A Dupuis	6	7

Semifinals
Q	(Netherlands) P Wessels	7	7
Q	(France) A Dupuis	6^{5}	6^{3}

=== Section 2 ===
First round
6	(Argentina) JI Chela	4	4
(France) J Benneteau	6	6
(France) F Serra	7	4	4
WC	(Netherlands) R Haase	5	6	6
(Argentina) D Hartfield	3	0
Q	(Germany) M Berrer	6	6
(Latvia) E Gulbis	6^{5}	5
3	(Argentina) G Cañas	7	7
8	(France) M Gicquel	4	2
(Serbia) J Tipsarević	6	6
(Thailand) D Udomchoke	6	3	4
LL	(Czech Republic) L Dlouhý	4	6	6
(Italy) A Seppi	6	6
(Austria) A Peya	4	4
(France) G Monfils	6	3	0
2	(Croatia) I Ljubičić	3	6	6

Second round
(France) J Benneteau	7	6
WC	(Netherlands) R Haase	6^{5}	3
Q	(Germany) M Berrer	3	6	6
3	(Argentina) G Cañas	6	4	4
(Serbia) J Tipsarević	6	2	7
LL	(Czech Republic) L Dlouhý	2	6	5
(Italy) A Seppi	3	4
2	(Croatia) I Ljubičić	6	6

Quarterfinals
(France) J Benneteau	7	7
Q	(Germany) M Berrer	6^{2}	5
(Serbia) J Tipsarević	3	7	3
2	(Croatia) I Ljubičić	6	6^{8}	6

Semifinals
(France) J Benneteau	6^{1}	6	4
2	(Croatia) I Ljubičić	7	3	6
