= 2008 Ordina Open – Women's singles =

Women's singles
- 2008 Ordina Open

Final
- Champion: (Thailand) Tamarine Tanasugarn
- Runner-up: (Russia) Dinara Safina
- Score: 7–5, 6–3

Details
- Draw: 30 (4 Q / 2 WC )
- Seeds: 8

Events
Singles	men	women
Doubles	men	women
← 2007 ·	Ordina Open	· 2009 →

Anna Chakvetadze was the defending champion, but lost in the quarterfinals to Al'ona Bondarenko.

Unseeded Tamarine Tanasugarn won in the final 7–5, 6–3, against Dinara Safina.

== Seeds ==
The top two seeds receive a bye into the second round.

1. (Russia) Elena Dementieva (semifinals)
2. (Russia) Anna Chakvetadze (quarterfinals)
3. (Russia) Dinara Safina (final)
4. (Italy) Francesca Schiavone (first round)
5. (Italy) Flavia Pennetta (first round)
6. (Russia) Maria Kirilenko (first round)
7. (Slovenia) Katarina Srebotnik (quarterfinals, withdrew due to a left ankle injury)
8. (Ukraine) Alona Bondarenko (semifinals)

== Main draw ==
=== Key ===
- Q = Qualifier
- WC = Wild card
- LL = Lucky loser
- Alt = Alternate
- ITF = ITF entry
- PR = Protected ranking
- SR = Special ranking
- SE = Special exempt
- JE = Junior exempt
- JR = Junior Accelerator Programme entrant
- CO = College Accelerator Programme entrant
- NG = Next Gen Accelerator Program entrant
- w/o = Walkover
- r = Retired
- d = Defaulted

=== Finals ===
Semifinals
1	(Russia) Elena Dementieva	3	2
3	(Russia) Dinara Safina	6	6
Q	(Thailand) Tamarine Tanasugarn	6	6
8	(Ukraine) Alona Bondarenko	2	4

Final
3	(Russia) Dinara Safina	5	3
Q	(Thailand) Tamarine Tanasugarn	7	6

=== Top half ===
First round
(Italy) S Errani	7	6
(United Kingdom) A Keothavong	6^{5}	2
(Ukraine) M Koryttseva	6	6
WC	(Netherlands) A Rus	4	4
WC	(Romania) S Cîrstea	7	6
6	(Russia) M Kirilenko	5	4
3	(Russia) D Safina	6	6
(France) P Parmentier	4	1
(Russia) E Vesnina	2	3
(France) C Pin	6	6
LL	(Chinese Taipei) Y-j Chan	7	7
(Sweden) S Arvidsson	5	5
(Spain) A Medina Garrigues	2	6	3
7	(Slovenia) K Srebotnik	6	4	6

Second round
1	(Russia) E Dementieva	6	7
(Italy) S Errani	3	5
(Ukraine) M Koryttseva	6^{3}	4
WC	(Romania) S Cîrstea	7	6
3	(Russia) D Safina	6	6
(France) C Pin	1	4
LL	(Chinese Taipei) Y-j Chan	4	3
7	(Slovenia) K Srebotnik	6	6

Quarterfinals
1	(Russia) E Dementieva	6	6
WC	(Romania) S Cîrstea	2	4
3	(Russia) D Safina	w/o
7	(Slovenia) K Srebotnik

Semifinals
1	(Russia) E Dementieva	3	2
3	(Russia) D Safina	6	6

=== Bottom half ===
First round
5	(Italy) F Pennetta	4	3
(India) S Mirza	6	6
(Japan) A Sugiyama	1	7	6^{7}
(Netherlands) M Krajicek	6	5	7
Q	(Thailand) T Tanasugarn	6	6
(Ukraine) K Bondarenko	3	3
(United States) A Harkleroad	6	6
4	(Italy) F Schiavone	3	4
8	(Ukraine) A Bondarenko	6	4	6
Q	(Czech Republic) I Benešová	4	6	4
(United States) A Gordon	1	1
Q	(New Zealand) M Erakovic	6	6
Q	(Germany) A Kerber	6	3	6
(Czech Republic) K Zakopalová	4	6	4

Second round
(India) S Mirza	2	2
(Netherlands) M Krajicek	6	6
Q	(Thailand) T Tanasugarn	4	6	7
(United States) A Harkleroad	6	4	5
8	(Ukraine) A Bondarenko	3	6	6
Q	(New Zealand) M Erakovic	6	4	3
Q	(Germany) A Kerber	3	6	6^{1}
2	(Russia) A Chakvetadze	6	3	7

Quarterfinals
(Netherlands) M Krajicek	6	3	4
Q	(Thailand) T Tanasugarn	3	6	6
8	(Ukraine) A Bondarenko	6	3	6
2	(Russia) A Chakvetadze	2	6	2

Semifinals
Q	(Thailand) T Tanasugarn	6	6
8	(Ukraine) A Bondarenko	2	4

== Qualifying draw ==
=== Seeds ===
1. (Czech Republic) Iveta Benešová (qualified)
2. (New Zealand) Marina Erakovic (qualified)
3. (Poland) Marta Domachowska (qualifying competition)
4. (Russia) Anastasia Rodionova (first round)
5. (Chinese Taipei) Chan Yung-jan (qualifying competition)
6. (Germany) Sabine Lisicki (first round)
7. (Thailand) Tamarine Tanasugarn (qualified)
8. (Canada) Aleksandra Wozniak (qualifying competition)

=== Qualifiers ===
1. (Czech Republic) Iveta Benešová
2. (New Zealand) Marina Erakovic
3. (Germany) Angelique Kerber
4. (Thailand) Tamarine Tanasugarn

==== Lucky losers ====
1. (Chinese Taipei) Chan Yung-jan

=== First qualifier ===
First round
1	(Czech Republic) Iveta Benešová	6	6
(United States) Robin Stephenson	1	2
(Belgium) Debbrich Feys	2	1
5	(Chinese Taipei) Chan Yung-jan	6	6

Qualifying competition
1	(Czech Republic) Iveta Benešová	3	6	7
5	(Chinese Taipei) Chan Yung-jan	6	1	6^{0}

=== Second qualifier ===
First round
2	(New Zealand) Marina Erakovic	6	6
(Latvia) Līga Dekmeijere	0	4
WC	(Netherlands) Brenda Schultz-McCarthy	4	4
8	(Canada) Aleksandra Wozniak	6	6

Qualifying competition
2	(New Zealand) Marina Erakovic	6	6
8	(Canada) Aleksandra Wozniak	0	4

=== Third qualifier ===
First round
3	(Poland) Marta Domachowska	6	6
WC	(Netherlands) Nicole Thyssen	1	1
(Germany) Angelique Kerber	6^{4}	6	6
6	(Germany) Sabine Lisicki	7	1	2

Qualifying competition
3	(Poland) Marta Domachowska	3	3
(Germany) Angelique Kerber	6	6

=== Fourth qualifier ===
First round
4	(Russia) Anastasia Rodionova	7	2	2
(Croatia) Mirjana Lučić-Baroni	6^{3}	6	6
(Canada) Stéphanie Dubois	4	3
7	(Thailand) Tamarine Tanasugarn	6	6

Qualifying competition
(Croatia) Mirjana Lučić-Baroni	3	6	4
7	(Thailand) Tamarine Tanasugarn	6	4	6
