= 2007 Hastings Direct International Championships =

- Date: 16-23 June
- Edition: 33rd
- Category: Tier II
- Draw: 28S / 16D
- Prize money: $600,000
- Surface: Grass / outdoor
- Location: Eastbourne, United Kingdom

Champions

Singles
- (Belgium) Justine Henin

Doubles
- (United States) Lisa Raymond / (Australia) Samantha Stosur
← 2006 ·	Eastbourne International	· 2008 →

The 2007 Hastings Direct International Championships was a women's tennis tournament played on grass courts at the Eastbourne Tennis Centre in Eastbourne in the United Kingdom that was part of Tier II of the 2007 WTA Tour. It was the 33rd edition of the tournament and was held from 16 June through 23 June 2007. Justine Henin won the tournament.

== Finals ==
=== Singles ===
(Belgium) Justine Henin defeated (France) Amélie Mauresmo 7–5, 6–7^{(4–7)}, 7–6^{(7–2)}

- It was Henin's 5th title of the year and the 34th of her career.

=== Doubles ===
(United States) Lisa Raymond / (Australia) Samantha Stosur defeated (Czech Republic) Květa Peschke / (Australia) Rennae Stubbs 6–7^{(5–7)}, 6–4, 6–3

- It was Raymond's 5th title of the year and the 69th of her career. It was Stosur's 5th title of the year and the 22nd of her career.
