= 2007 Ordina Open – Women's singles =

Women's singles
- 2007 Ordina Open

Final
- Champion: (Russia) Anna Chakvetadze
- Runner-up: (Serbia) Jelena Janković
- Score: 7–6^{(7–2)}, 3–6, 6–3

Details
- Draw: 30 (4 Q / 2 WC )
- Seeds: 8

Events
Singles	men	women
Doubles	men	women
← 2006 ·	Ordina Open	· 2008 →

Third-seeded Anna Chakvetadze was able to overcome Jelena Janković to emerge the victor of the 2007 Ordina Open Women's Singles Competition.

== Seeds ==
1. (Serbia) Jelena Janković (final)
2. (Serbia) Ana Ivanovic (quarterfinals)
3. (Russia) Anna Chakvetadze (champion)
4. (Russia) Dinara Safina (semifinals)
5. (Slovakia) Daniela Hantuchová (semifinals)
6. (Slovenia) Katarina Srebotnik (first round)
7. (Spain) Anabel Medina Garrigues (first round)
8. (Ukraine) Alona Bondarenko (Quarterfinal)

== Draw ==
=== Key ===
- Q = Qualifier
- WC = Wild card
- LL = Lucky loser
- Alt = Alternate
- ITF = ITF entry
- PR = Protected ranking
- SR = Special ranking
- SE = Special exempt
- JE = Junior exempt
- JR = Junior Accelerator Programme entrant
- CO = College Accelerator Programme entrant
- NG = Next Gen Accelerator Program entrant
- w/o = Walkover
- r = Retired
- d = Defaulted

=== Finals ===
Quarterfinals
1	(Serbia) Jelena Janković	6	6
8	(Ukraine) Alona Bondarenko	2	1
4	(Russia) Dinara Safina	6	7
Q	(Italy) Flavia Pennetta	1	5
(Germany) Angelique Kerber	2	2
3	(Russia) Anna Chakvetadze	6	6
5	(Slovakia) Daniela Hantuchová	6	6
2	(Serbia) Ana Ivanovic	3	1

Semifinals
1	(Serbia) Jelena Janković	6	3	7^{8}
4	(Russia) Dinara Safina	3	6	6^{6}
3	(Russia) Anna Chakvetadze	6	6
5	(Slovakia) Daniela Hantuchová	3	4

Final
1	(Serbia) Jelena Janković	6^{2}	6	3
3	(Russia) Anna Chakvetadze	7^{7}	3	6

=== Section 1 ===
First round
(United States) M Tu	5	6	7
(Estonia) K Kanepi	7	2	5
(Italy) R Vinci	6	6
(Russia) E Bovina	0	4
WC	(Netherlands) A Rus	1	1
8	(Ukraine) A Bondarenko	6	6
4	(Russia) D Safina	6	5	6
Q	(France) C Pin	3	7	3
(Netherlands) M Krajicek	6	6
(Argentina) G Dulko	3	2
(Italy) F Pennetta	3	7^{8}	6
Q	(Italy) K Knapp	6	6^{6}	2
Q	(Germany) T Malek	6	6
6	(Slovenia) K Srebotnik	3	2

Second round
1	(Serbia) J Janković	w	/	o
(United States) M Tu	w	/	o
(Italy) R Vinci	6^{4}	3
8	(Ukraine) A Bondarenko	7^{7}	6
(Netherlands) M Krajicek	4	6	4
4	(Russia) D Safina	6	3	6
(Italy) F Pennetta	6	6
Q	(Germany) T Malek	0	4

Quarterfinals
1	(Serbia) J Janković	6	6
8	(Ukraine) A Bondarenko	2	1
4	(Russia) D Safina	6	7
(Italy) F Pennetta	1	5

Semifinals
1	(Serbia) J Janković	6	3	7^{8}
4	(Russia) D Safina	3	6	6^{6}

=== Section 2 ===
First round
7	(Spain) A Medina Garrigues	6^{4}	6	3
Q	(Russia) E Vesnina	7^{7}	3	6
(Germany) A Kerber	3	6	6
(Chinese Taipei) Y-j Chan	6	4	3
(India) S Mirza	6	4	4
(Italy) F Schiavone	3	6	6
(Belarus) V Azarenka	7	2	2
3	(Russia) A Chakvetadze	5	6	6
5	(Slovakia) D Hantuchová	6	6
(Russia) O Poutchkova	2	1
WC	(Russia) K Lykina	2	1
(United States) M Shaughnessy	6	6
(France) S Brémond	6	2	1
(Greece) E Daniilidou	6	2	1

Second round
(Russia) E Vesnina	4	4
(Germany) A Kerber	6	6
(Italy) F Schiavone	4	6^{3}
3	(Russia) A Chakvetadze	6	7^{7}
5	(Slovakia) D Hantuchová	3	6	5r
(United States) M Shaughnessy	6	3	3
(Greece) E Daniilidou	6^{4}	3
2	(Serbia) A Ivanovic	7^{7}	6

Quarterfinals
(Germany) A Kerber	2	2
3	(Russia) A Chakvetadze	6	6
5	(Slovakia) D Hantuchová	6	6
2	(Serbia) A Ivanovic	3	1

Semifinals
3	(Russia) A Chakvetadze	6	6
5	(Slovakia) D Hantuchová	3	4
