= 2007 Hastings Direct International Championships – Singles =

Singles
- 2007 Hastings Direct International Championships

Final
- Champion: (Belgium) Justine Henin
- Runner-up: (France) Amélie Mauresmo
- Score: 7–5, 6–7^{(4–7)}, 7–6^{(7–2)}

Details
- Draw: 28
- Seeds: 8

Events
Singles	Doubles
← 2006 ·	Eastbourne International	· 2008 →

Defending champion Justine Henin defeated Amélie Mauresmo in the final, 7–5, 6–7^{(4–7)}, 7–6^{(7–2)} to win the singles tennis title at the 2007 Eastbourne International.

== Seeds ==
A champion seed is indicated in bold text while text in italics indicates the round in which that seed was eliminated. The top four seeds received a bye to the second round.

1. (Belgium) **Justine Henin (champion)**
2. (France) Amélie Mauresmo (final)
3. (Russia) Nadia Petrova (semifinals)
4. (Russia) Elena Dementieva (quarterfinals)
5. (Czech Republic) Nicole Vaidišová (quarterfinals)
6. (Israel) Shahar Pe'er (quarterfinals)
7. n/a
8. (France) Marion Bartoli (semifinals)
9. (Austria) Sybille Bammer (quarterfinals)

== Draw ==
=== Key ===
- Q = Qualifier
- WC = Wild card
- LL = Lucky loser
- Alt = Alternate
- ITF = ITF entry
- PR = Protected ranking
- SR = Special ranking
- SE = Special exempt
- JE = Junior exempt
- JR = Junior Accelerator Programme entrant
- CO = College Accelerator Programme entrant
- NG = Next Gen Accelerator Program entrant
- w/o = Walkover
- r = Retired
- d = Defaulted

=== Final ===
Final
1	(Belgium) **Justine Henin**	**7**	6^{4}	**7^{7}**
2	(France) Amélie Mauresmo	5	**7^{7}**	6^{2}

=== Section 1 ===
First round
(Poland) **A Radwańska**	**6**	5	**6**
LL	(United States) J Craybas	2	**7**	0
WC	(United Kingdom) A Keothavong	2	**6**	6^{5}
Q	(United Kingdom) **E Baltacha**	**6**	2	**7^{7}**
(Australia) S Stosur	**6**	4	4
5	(Czech Republic) **N Vaidišová**	3	**6**	**6**
(Russia) V Bardina	5	3
Q	(United Kingdom) **K O'Brien**	**7**	**6**
WC	(Australia) A Molik	**6**	3	6^{3}
WC	(United Kingdom) **M South**	1	**6**	**7^{7}**
(Italy) T Garbin	2	3
8	(France) **M Bartoli**	**6**	**6**

Second round
1	(Belgium) **J Henin**	**6**	**6**
(Poland) A Radwańska	2	2
Q	(United Kingdom) E Baltacha	3	2
5	(Czech Republic) **N Vaidišová**	**6**	**6**
4	(Russia) **E Dementieva**	**6**	**6**
Q	(United Kingdom) K O'Brien	3	4
WC	(United Kingdom) M South	1	3
8	(France) **M Bartoli**	**6**	**6**

Quarterfinals
1	(Belgium) **J Henin**	**6**	**6**
5	(Czech Republic) N Vaidišová	2	2
4	(Russia) E Dementieva	1	0
8	(France) **M Bartoli**	**6**	**6**

Semifinals
1	(Belgium) **J Henin**	**6**	**6**
8	(France) M Bartoli	1	3

=== Section 2 ===
First round
9	(Austria) **S Bammer**	**6**	**6**
(Russia) M Kirilenko	2	3
(Czech Republic) **L Šafářová**	**7^{7}**	**7^{7}**
(Germany) A Grönefeld	6^{0}	6^{5}
(France) **N Dechy**	**6**	2	**6**
(Japan) A Morigami	4	**6**	3
6	(Israel) **S Pe'er**	**6**	5
Q	(Russia) E Likhovtseva	2	**7**	4
Q	(Japan) **A Nakamura**	**6**	**6**
(France) A Rezaï	1	4
(Japan) A Sugiyama	6^{3}	3
(Italy) **M Santangelo**	**7^{7}**	**6**

Second round
9	(Austria) **S Bammer**	**7^{7}**	5	**6**
(Czech Republic) L Šafářová	6^{5}	**7**	3
(France) N Dechy	5	5
3	(Russia) **N Petrova**	**7**	**7**
6	(Israel) **S Pe'er**	**6**	**6**
Q	(Japan) A Nakamura	3	2
(Italy) M Santangelo	2	3
2	(France) **A Mauresmo**	**6**	**6**

Quarterfinals
9	(Austria) S Bammer	**7^{8}**	5	4
3	(Russia) **N Petrova**	6^{6}	**7**	**6**
6	(Israel) S Pe'er	3	4
2	(France) **A Mauresmo**	**6**	**6**

Semifinals
3	(Russia) N Petrova	4	r
2	(France) **A Mauresmo**	**6**
