= 2008 Western & Southern Financial Group Masters – Doubles =

Doubles
- 2008 Western & Southern Financial Group Masters

Final
- Champions: (United States) Bob Bryan (United States) Mike Bryan
- Runners-up: (Israel) Jonathan Erlich (Israel) Andy Ram
- Score: 4–6, 7–6^{(7–2)}, [10–7]

Details
- Draw: 24
- Seeds: 8

Events
Singles	Doubles
- Western & Southern Financial Group Masters

Jonathan Erlich and Andy Ram were the defending champions, but Bob Bryan and Mike Bryan defeated them 4–6, 7–6^{(7–2)}, [10–7], in the final.

== Seeds ==
All seeds receive a bye into the second round.

1. (United States) Bob Bryan / (United States) Mike Bryan (champions)
2. (Canada) Daniel Nestor / (Serbia) Nenad Zimonjić (semifinals)
3. (Israel) Jonathan Erlich / (Israel) Andy Ram (final)
4. (India) Mahesh Bhupathi / (The Bahamas) Mark Knowles (semifinals)
5. (Sweden) Jonas Björkman / (Zimbabwe) Kevin Ullyett (second round)
6. (Czech Republic) Lukáš Dlouhý / (India) Leander Paes (quarterfinals)
7. (Czech Republic) Martin Damm / (Czech Republic) Pavel Vízner (second round)
8. (Poland) Mariusz Fyrstenberg / (Poland) Marcin Matkowski (quarterfinals)

== Draw ==
Key

- Q = Qualifier
- WC = Wild card
- LL = Lucky loser
- Alt = Alternate
- ITF = ITF entry
- PR = Protected ranking
- SR = Special ranking
- SE = Special exempt
- JE = Junior exempt
- JR = Junior Accelerator Programme entrant
- CO = College Accelerator Programme entrant
- NG = Next Gen Accelerator Program entrant
- w/o = Walkover
- r = Retired
- d = Defaulted

=== Finals ===
Semifinals
1	(United States) Bob Bryan (United States) Mike Bryan	4	7^{9}	[10]
4	(India) Mahesh Bhupathi (The Bahamas) Mark Knowles	6	6^{7}	[8]
3	(Israel) Jonathan Erlich (Israel) Andy Ram	6	5	[10]
2	(Canada) Daniel Nestor (Serbia) Nenad Zimonjić	4	7	[7]

Final
1	(United States) Bob Bryan (United States) Mike Bryan	4	7^{7}	[10]
3	(Israel) Jonathan Erlich (Israel) Andy Ram	6	6^{2}	[7]

=== Top half ===
First round
(United States) J Blake (United States) S Querrey	6^{2}	6	[7]
ALT	(United States) T Widom (United States) M Yani	7^{7}	3	[10]
(Australia) P Hanley (Australia) J Kerr	6	7
(Spain) T Robredo (Brazil) A Sá	1	5
(Spain) F López (Spain) F Verdasco	5	6^{6}
(Czech Republic) T Berdych (Czech Republic) R Štěpánek	7	7^{8}
ALT	(Chinese Taipei) T Chen (United States) P King	4	6^{2}
WC	(United States) M Fish (United States) J Isner	6	7^{7}

Second round
1	(United States) B Bryan (United States) M Bryan	6	6
ALT	(United States) T Widom (United States) M Yani	1	2
(Australia) P Hanley (Australia) J Kerr	4	7^{7}	[5]
8	(Poland) M Fyrstenberg (Poland) M Matkowski	6	6^{5}	[10]
4	(India) M Bhupathi (The Bahamas) M Knowles	w/o
(Czech Republic) T Berdych (Czech Republic) R Štěpánek
WC	(United States) M Fish (United States) J Isner	7^{7}	7^{16}
5	(Sweden) J Björkman (Zimbabwe) K Ullyett	6^{4}	6^{14}

Quarterfinals
1	(United States) B Bryan (United States) M Bryan	6	7^{7}
8	(Poland) M Fyrstenberg (Poland) M Matkowski	4	6^{0}
4	(India) M Bhupathi (The Bahamas) M Knowles	7	6^{5}	[12]
WC	(United States) M Fish (United States) J Isner	5	7^{7}	[10]

Semifinals
1	(United States) B Bryan (United States) M Bryan	4	7^{9}	[10]
4	(India) M Bhupathi (The Bahamas) M Knowles	6	6^{7}	[8]

=== Bottom half ===
First round
(Sweden) S Aspelin (United Kingdom) J Murray	7^{7}	6
(India) R Bopanna (United States) J Cerretani	6^{5}	2
WC	(United States) J Levine (United States) D Young	6^{8}	6^{1}
(Sweden) R Lindstedt (Finland) J Nieminen	7^{10}	7^{7}
(Chile) F González (Serbia) J Tipsarević
(Croatia) I Karlović (Netherlands) R Wassen	w/o
(Italy) S Bolelli (Italy) A Seppi	7^{7}	2	[10]
(United States) S Lipsky (United States) D Martin	6^{4}	6	[5]

Second round
7	(Czech Republic) M Damm (Czech Republic) P Vízner	3	6^{5}
(Sweden) S Aspelin (United Kingdom) J Murray	6	7^{7}
(Sweden) R Lindstedt (Finland) J Nieminen	6	3	[10]
3	(Israel) J Erlich (Israel) A Ram	3	6	[12]
6	(Czech Republic) L Dlouhý (India) L Paes	6	6
(Croatia) I Karlović (Netherlands) R Wassen	4	2
(Italy) S Bolelli (Italy) A Seppi	3	2
2	(Canada) D Nestor (Serbia) N Zimonjić	6	6

Quarterfinals
(Sweden) S Aspelin (United Kingdom) J Murray	3	3
3	(Israel) J Erlich (Israel) A Ram	6	6
6	(Czech Republic) L Dlouhý (India) L Paes	6^{6}	6^{5}
2	(Canada) D Nestor (Serbia) N Zimonjić	7^{8}	7^{7}

Semifinals
3	(Israel) J Erlich (Israel) A Ram	6	5	[10]
2	(Canada) D Nestor (Serbia) N Zimonjić	4	7	[7]
