= 2007 Ordina Open =

- Date: 18–25 June
- Edition: 18th
- Surface: Grass / outdoor
- Location: Rosmalen, 's-Hertogenbosch, Netherlands

Champions

Men's singles
- (Croatia) Ivan Ljubičić

Women's singles
- (Russia) Anna Chakvetadze

Men's doubles
- (South Africa) Jeff Coetzee / (Netherlands) Rogier Wassen

Women's doubles
- (Chinese Taipei) Chan Yung-Jan / (Chinese Taipei) Chuang Chia-Jung
← 2006 ·	Ordina Open	· 2008 →

The 2007 Ordina Open was the 2007 edition of the Ordina Open tennis tournament. It was the 18th edition of the tournament and was played on outdoor grass courts. The men's and women's tournament was held from 18 through 25 June 2007.

Ivan Ljubičić won his first grass title. Anna Chakvetadze won her second of four titles she would win in the year.

== Finals ==
=== Men's singles ===
(Croatia) Ivan Ljubičić defeated (Netherlands) Peter Wessels, 7–6^{(7–5)}, 4–6, 7–6^{(7–4)}

=== Women's singles ===
(Russia) Anna Chakvetadze defeated (Serbia) Jelena Janković, 7–6^{(7–2)}, 3–6, 6–3

=== Men's doubles ===
(South Africa) Jeff Coetzee / (Netherlands) Rogier Wassen defeated (Czech Republic) Martin Damm / (India) Leander Paes, 3–6, 7–6^{(7–5)}, [12–10]

=== Women's doubles ===
(Chinese Taipei) Chan Yung-Jan / (Chinese Taipei) Chuang Chia-Jung defeated (Spain) Anabel Medina Garrigues / (Spain) Virginia Ruano Pascual, 7–5, 6–2
