= 2005 Hastings Direct International Championships =

- Date: 13–18 June
- Edition: 31st
- Category: Tier II
- Surface: Grass / outdoor
- Location: Eastbourne, United Kingdom

Champions

Singles
- (Belgium) Kim Clijsters

Doubles
- (United States) Lisa Raymond / (Australia) Rennae Stubbs
← 2004 ·	Eastbourne International	· 2006 →

The 2005 Hastings Direct International Championships was a women's tennis tournament played on grass courts at the Eastbourne Tennis Centre in Eastbourne in the United Kingdom that was part of Tier II of the 2005 WTA Tour. It was the 31st edition of the tournament and was held from June 13 through June 18, 2005.

== Finals ==
=== Singles ===
(Belgium) Kim Clijsters defeated (Russia) Vera Douchevina 7–5, 6–0

- It was Clijsters' 3rd singles title of the year and the 24th of her career.

=== Doubles ===
(United States) Lisa Raymond / (Australia) Rennae Stubbs defeated (Russia) Elena Likhovtseva / (Russia) Vera Zvonareva 6–3, 7–5

- It was Raymond's 1st doubles title of the year and the 45th of her career. It was Stubbs' 1st title of the year and the 49th of her career.
