= 2009 Ordina Open =

- Date: 14–20 June
- Edition: 20th
- Surface: Grass / outdoor
- Location: Rosmalen, 's-Hertogenbosch, Netherlands

Champions

Men's singles
- (Germany) Benjamin Becker

Women's singles
- (Thailand) Tamarine Tanasugarn

Men's doubles
- (South Africa) Wesley Moodie / (Belgium) Dick Norman

Women's doubles
- (Italy) Sara Errani / (Italy) Flavia Pennetta
- Ordina Open

The 2009 Ordina Open is a tennis tournament played on outdoor grass courts. It is the 20th edition of the Ordina Open, and is part of the International Series of the 2009 ATP Tour, and of the WTA International tournaments of the 2009 WTA Tour. Both the men's and the women's events take place at the Autotron park in Rosmalen, 's-Hertogenbosch, Netherlands, from 14 June through 20 June 2009. Benjamin Becker and Tamarine Tanasugarn won the singles titles.

== Finals ==
=== Men's singles ===
(Germany) Benjamin Becker defeated (Netherlands) Raemon Sluiter, 7–5, 6–3

- It was Becker's only singles title of his career.

=== Women's singles ===
(Thailand) Tamarine Tanasugarn defeated (Belgium) Yanina Wickmayer, 6–3, 7–5

- It was Tanasugarn's only singles title of the year and the 3rd of her career.

=== Men's doubles ===
(South Africa) Wesley Moodie / (Belgium) Dick Norman defeated (Sweden) Johan Brunström / (Netherlands Antilles) Jean-Julien Rojer, 7–6^{(7–3)}, 6–7^{(8–10)}, [10–5]

=== Women's doubles ===
(Italy) Sara Errani / (Italy) Flavia Pennetta defeated (Netherlands) Michaëlla Krajicek / (Belgium) Yanina Wickmayer 6–4, 5–7, [13–11]

== ATP entrants ==
=== Seeds ===
Player	Nationality	Ranking*	Seeding
Fernando Verdasco	Spain	8	1
Tommy Robredo	Spain	15	2
David Ferrer	Spain	18	3
Rainer Schüttler	Germany	32	4
Igor Kunitsyn	Russia	39	5
Marc Gicquel	France	40	6
Jérémy Chardy	France	43	7
Mischa Zverev	Germany	45	8

- Seedings are based on the rankings of June 8, 2009.

=== Other entrants ===
The following players received wildcards into the main draw:

- (Sweden) Daniel Berta
- (Netherlands) Jesse Huta Galung
- (Netherlands) Raemon Sluiter

The following players received entry from the qualifying draw:

- (Germany) Benjamin Becker
- (Belgium) Kristof Vliegen
- (Belgium) Dick Norman
- (Netherlands) Thiemo de Bakker

== WTA entrants ==
=== Seeds ===
Player	Nationality	Ranking*	Seeding
Dinara Safina	Russia	1	1
Dominika Cibulková	Slovakia	14	2
Flavia Pennetta	Italy	15	3
Sorana Cîrstea	Romania	27	4
Alona Bondarenko	Ukraine	30	5
Daniela Hantuchová	Slovakia	33	6
Iveta Benešová	Czech Republic	35	7
Elena Vesnina	Russia	39	8

- Seedings are based on the rankings of June 8, 2009.

=== Other entrants ===
The following players received wildcards into the main draw:

- (Slovakia) Daniela Hantuchová
- (Thailand) Tamarine Tanasugarn
- (Netherlands) Michaëlla Krajicek
- (Belgium) Yanina Wickmayer

The following players received entry from the qualifying draw:

- (Belgium) Kirsten Flipkens
- (Italy) Maria Elena Camerin
- (Russia) Ksenia Pervak
- (Kazakhstan) Yaroslava Shvedova

The following players got entry through the Lucky loser spot:

- (France) Séverine Brémond
- (France) Stéphanie Foretz
