= 2006 Hastings Direct International Championships – Doubles =

Doubles
- 2006 Hastings Direct International Championships

Final
- Champions: (Russia) Svetlana Kuznetsova (France) Amélie Mauresmo
- Runners-up: (South Africa) Liezel Huber (United States) Martina Navratilova
- Score: 6–2, 6–4

Details
- Draw: 16
- Seeds: 4

Events
Singles	Doubles
← 2005 ·	Eastbourne International	· 2007 →

Lisa Raymond and Rennae Stubbs were the defending champions but they competed with different partners that year, Raymond with Samantha Stosur and Stubbs with Nathalie Dechy.

Dechy and Stubbs lost in the first round to Liezel Huber and Martina Navratilova.

Raymond and Stosur lost in the semifinals to Huber and Navratilova.

Svetlana Kuznetsova and Amélie Mauresmo won in the final 6–2, 6–4 against Huber and Navratilova.

== Seeds ==
Champion seeds are indicated in bold text while text in italics indicates the round in which those seeds were eliminated.

1. (United States) Lisa Raymond / (Australia) Samantha Stosur (semifinals)
2. (Slovakia) Daniela Hantuchová / (Japan) Ai Sugiyama (quarterfinals)
3. (Germany) Anna-Lena Grönefeld / (United States) Meghann Shaughnessy (first round)
4. (South Africa) Liezel Huber / (United States) Martina Navratilova (final)

== Draw ==
=== Key ===
- Q = Qualifier
- WC = Wild card
- LL = Lucky loser
- Alt = Alternate
- SE = Special exempt
- PR = Protected ranking
- ITF = ITF entry
- JE = Junior exempt
- w/o = Walkover
- r = Retired
- d = Defaulted
- SR = Special ranking

First round
1	(United States) **L Raymond** (Australia) **S Stosur**	**6**	**6**
Q	(Bulgaria) T Pironkova (China) M Yuan	1	1
(Slovakia) **J Gajdošová** (Russia) **A Rodionova**	**7^{7}**	**7^{7}**
(Russia) A Chakvetadze (Russia) V Dushevina	6^{5}	6^{3}
4	(South Africa) **L Huber** (United States) **M Navratilova**	3	**6**	**7^{7}**
(France) N Dechy (Australia) R Stubbs	**6**	2	6^{2}
LL	(Japan) A Morigami (Japan) A Nakamura	1	1
WC	(United Kingdom) **C Curran** (United States) **S Perry**	**6**	**6**
(Russia) **S Kuznetsova** (France) **A Mauresmo**	**6**	**6**
(Russia) E Likhovtseva (Russia) A Myskina	4	4
(United States) **B Mattek** (United States) **M Washington**	**6**	**6**
3	(Germany) A-L Grönefeld (United States) M Shaughnessy	0	0
(Czech Republic) K Peschke (Italy) F Schiavone	6^{3}	2	r
(France) **M Bartoli** (Israel) **S Pe'er**	**7^{7}**	**5**
(France) S Foretz (Italy) A Serra Zanetti	6^{5}	2
2	(Slovakia) **D Hantuchová** (Japan) **A Sugiyama**	**7^{7}**	**6**

Quarterfinals
1	(United States) **L Raymond** (Australia) **S Stosur**	**6**	**6**
(Slovakia) J Gajdošová (Russia) A Rodionova	1	2
4	(South Africa) **L Huber** (United States) **M Navratilova**	**6**	**6**
WC	(United Kingdom) C Curran (United States) S Perry	1	2
(Russia) **S Kuznetsova** (France) **A Mauresmo**	**6**	**7^{10}**
(United States) B Mattek (United States) M Washington	4	6^{8}
(France) **M Bartoli** (Israel) **S Pe'er**	**6**	**7^{7}**
2	(Slovakia) D Hantuchová (Japan) A Sugiyama	4	6^{5}

Semifinals
1	(United States) L Raymond (Australia) S Stosur	6^{3}	6^{3}
4	(South Africa) **L Huber** (United States) **M Navratilova**	**7^{7}**	**7^{7}**
(Russia) **S Kuznetsova** (France) **A Mauresmo**	**6**	**6**
(France) M Bartoli (Israel) S Pe'er	3	2

Final
4	(South Africa) Liezel Huber (United States) Martina Navratilova	2	4
(Russia) **Svetlana Kuznetsova** (France) **Amélie Mauresmo**	**6**	**6**
