= 2009 Ordina Open – Men's doubles =

Men's doubles
- 2009 Ordina Open

Final
- Champions: (South Africa) Wesley Moodie (Belgium) Dick Norman
- Runners-up: (Sweden) Johan Brunström (Netherlands Antilles) Jean-Julien Rojer
- Score: 7–6^{(7–3)}, 6–7^{(8–10)}, [10–5]

Events
Singles	men	women
Doubles	men	women
← 2008 ·	Ordina Open	· 2010 →

Mario Ančić and Jürgen Melzer were the defending champions, but did not participate in the tournament this year.

== Seeds ==
1. (South Africa) Wesley Moodie / (Belgium) Dick Norman (champions)
2. (Czech Republic) František Čermák / (Slovakia) Michal Mertiňák (first round)
3. (Germany) Christopher Kas / (Germany) Philipp Petzschner (second round)
4. (Czech Republic) Martin Damm / (Sweden) Robert Lindstedt (first round)

== Draw ==
=== Key ===
- Q = Qualifier
- WC = Wild card
- LL = Lucky loser
- Alt = Alternate
- SE = Special exempt
- PR = Protected ranking
- ITF = ITF entry
- JE = Junior exempt
- w/o = Walkover
- r = Retired
- d = Defaulted
- SR = Special ranking

=== Draw ===
First round
1	(South Africa) W Moodie (Belgium) D Norman	6	7^{7}
WC	(Netherlands) T de Bakker (Netherlands) J Huta Galung	4	6^{5}
(Netherlands) R Wassen (Slovakia) I Zelenay	4	2
(France) A Clément (France) M Gicquel	6	6
4	(Czech Republic) M Damm (Sweden) R Lindstedt	4	6	[7]
(Russia) I Kunitsyn (Israel) D Sela	6	2	[10]
(United States) E Butorac (United States) S Lipsky	6	7^{7}
(Romania) A Pavel (Romania) H Tecău	4	6^{5}
(Serbia) D Vemić (Germany) M Zverev	6^{8}	2
(Sweden) J Brunström (Netherlands Antilles) J-J Rojer	7^{10}	6
(Spain) Ó Hernández (Spain) F Verdasco	7^{7}	3	[8]
3	(Germany) C Kas (Germany) P Petzschner	6^{2}	6	[10]
(Spain) P Andújar (Spain) D Ferrer	2	3
(Austria) O Marach (Czech Republic) D Škoch	6	6
WC	(Netherlands) R Sluiter (Netherlands) P Wessels	7^{7}	6^{4}	[10]
2	(Czech Republic) F Čermák (Slovakia) M Mertiňák	6^{3}	7^{7}	[4]

Quarterfinals
1	(South Africa) W Moodie (Belgium) D Norman	6	6
(France) A Clément (France) M Gicquel	3	4
(Russia) I Kunitsyn (Israel) D Sela	3	6	[8]
(United States) E Butorac (United States) S Lipsky	6	3	[10]
(Sweden) J Brunström (Netherlands Antilles) J-J Rojer	2	6	[12]
3	(Germany) C Kas (Germany) P Petzschner	6	2	[10]
(Austria) O Marach (Czech Republic) D Škoch	7^{7}	6^{3}	[11]
WC	(Netherlands) R Sluiter (Netherlands) P Wessels	6^{5}	7 ^{7}	[9]

Semifinals
1	(South Africa) W Moodie (Belgium) D Norman	6	3	[12]
(United States) E Butorac (United States) S Lipsky	4	6	[10]
(Sweden) J Brunström (Netherlands Antilles) J-J Rojer	6	7^{7}
(Austria) O Marach (Czech Republic) D Škoch	3	6^{5}

Final
1	(South Africa) W Moodie (Belgium) D Norman	7^{7}	6^{8}	[10]
(Sweden) J Brunström (Netherlands Antilles) J-J Rojer	6^{3}	7^{10}	[5]
