= 2006 Hastings Direct International Championships =

- Date: 19–24 June
- Edition: 32nd
- Category: Tier II
- Surface: Grass / outdoor
- Location: Eastbourne, United Kingdom

Champions

Singles
- (Belgium) Justine Henin-Hardenne

Doubles
- (Russia) Svetlana Kuznetsova / (France) Amélie Mauresmo
← 2005 ·	Eastbourne International	· 2007 →

The 2006 Hastings Direct International Championships was a women's tennis tournament played on grass courts at the Eastbourne Tennis Centre in Eastbourne in the United Kingdom that was part of Tier II of the 2006 WTA Tour. It was the 32nd edition of the tournament and was held from June 19 through June 24, 2006. Justine Henin-Hardenne won the singles.

== Finals ==
=== Singles ===
(Belgium) Justine Henin-Hardenne defeated (Russia) Anastasia Myskina 4–6, 6–1, 7–6^{(7–5)}

- It was Henin-Hardenne's 4th title of the year and the 29th of her career.

=== Doubles ===
(Russia) Svetlana Kuznetsova / (France) Amélie Mauresmo defeated (South Africa) Liezel Huber / (United States) Martina Navratilova 6–2, 6–4

- It was Kuznetsova's only doubles title of the year and the 13th of her career. It was Mauresmo's only doubles title of the year and the 2nd of her career.
