= 2008 Western & Southern Financial Group Masters – Singles =

Singles
- 2008 Western & Southern Financial Group Masters

Final
- Champion: (United Kingdom) Andy Murray
- Runner-up: (Serbia) Novak Djokovic
- Score: 7–6^{(7–4)}, 7–6^{(7–5)}

Details
- Draw: 56
- Seeds: 16

Events
Singles	Doubles
- Western & Southern Financial Group Masters

Andy Murray defeated Novak Djokovic in the final, 7–6^{(7–4)}, 7–6^{(7–5)} to win the men's singles tennis title at the 2008 Cincinnati Masters. It was his first Masters title.

Roger Federer was the defending champion, but lost in the third round to Ivo Karlović.

Rafael Nadal's 32-match winning streak ended in the semifinals when he was defeated by Djokovic.

== Seeds ==
The top eight seeds receive a bye into the second round.

1. (Switzerland) Roger Federer (third round)
2. (Spain) Rafael Nadal (semifinals)
3. (Serbia) Novak Djokovic (final)
4. (Russia) Nikolay Davydenko (second round)
5. (Spain) David Ferrer (second round)
6. (United States) ~~Andy Roddick~~ (withdrew due to a shoulder injury)
7. (United States) James Blake (third round)
8. (United Kingdom) Andy Murray (champion)
9. (Switzerland) ~~Stanislas Wawrinka~~ (withdrew due to a right knee injury)
10. (Spain) Fernando Verdasco (third round)
11. (France) Richard Gasquet (second round)
12. (Spain) Tommy Robredo (second round)
13. (Chile) Fernando González (first round)
14. (Russia) Mikhail Youzhny (first round)
15. (Czech Republic) Radek Štěpánek (first round)
16. (Croatia) Ivo Karlović (semifinals)

== Draw ==
Key

- Q = Qualifier
- WC = Wild card
- LL = Lucky loser
- Alt = Alternate
- ITF = ITF entry
- PR = Protected ranking
- SR = Special ranking
- SE = Special exempt
- JE = Junior exempt
- JR = Junior Accelerator Programme entrant
- CO = College Accelerator Programme entrant
- NG = Next Gen Accelerator Program entrant
- w/o = Walkover
- r = Retired
- d = Defaulted

=== Finals ===
Quarterfinals
16	(Croatia) Ivo Karlović	7^{8}	7^{7}
(Germany) Philipp Kohlschreiber	6^{6}	6^{3}
(Spain) Carlos Moyá	6	3	1
8	(United Kingdom) Andy Murray	2	6	6
(Latvia) Ernests Gulbis	3	4
3	(Serbia) Novak Djokovic	6	6
(Ecuador) Nicolás Lapentti	6^{3}	1
2	(Spain) Rafael Nadal	7^{7}	6

Semifinals
16	(Croatia) Ivo Karlović	4	4
8	(United Kingdom) Andy Murray	6	6
3	(Serbia) Novak Djokovic	6	7
2	(Spain) Rafael Nadal	1	5

Final
8	(United Kingdom) Andy Murray	7^{7}	7^{7}
3	(Serbia) Novak Djokovic	6^{4}	6^{5}

=== Top half ===
==== Section 1 ====
First round
Q	(Sweden) J Björkman	0	6^{5}
(United States) R Ginepri	6	7^{7}
LL	(Chile) P Capdeville	7	2	2
(Argentina) J Acasuso	5	6	6
(Brazil) T Bellucci	3	4
16	(Croatia) I Karlović	6	6
12	(Spain) T Robredo	6	6
(United States) M Fish	2	2
(France) J Benneteau	0	3
(Sweden) R Söderling	6	6
(Germany) P Kohlschreiber	6	6
Q	(United States) M Yani	3	4

Second round
1	(Switzerland) R Federer	6^{2}	7^{7}	6
(United States) R Ginepri	7^{7}	6^{5}	0
(Argentina) J Acasuso	3	6^{3}
16	(Croatia) I Karlović	6	7^{7}
12	(Spain) T Robredo	6^{6}	4
(Sweden) R Söderling	7^{8}	6
(Germany) P Kohlschreiber	6	6
LL	(South Korea) W-s Jun	2	2

Third round
1	(Switzerland) R Federer	6^{6}	6	6^{5}
16	(Croatia) I Karlović	7^{8}	4	7^{7}
(Sweden) R Söderling	6^{4}	7	6^{8}
(Germany) P Kohlschreiber	7^{7}	5	7^{10}

Quarterfinals
16	(Croatia) I Karlović	7^{8}	7^{7}
(Germany) P Kohlschreiber	6^{6}	6^{3}

==== Section 2 ====
First round
(Serbia) J Tipsarević	6^{5}	5
(Spain) C Moyá	7^{7}	7
WC	(United States) J Isner	7^{7}	6
Q	(Italy) A Stoppini	6^{2}	3
(Russia) I Andreev	7^{7}	6^{4}	7^{7}
15	(Czech Republic) R Štěpánek	6^{4}	7^{7}	6^{3}
11	(France) R Gasquet	3	6	1
(France) M Llodra	6	1	0^{r}
(Russia) D Tursunov	7^{7}	6
WC	(Russia) M Safin	6^{5}	4
(United States) S Querrey	6	4	6
(France) P-H Mathieu	4	6	3

Second round
4	(Russia) N Davydenko	6^{8}	6	2
(Spain) C Moyá	7^{10}	4	6
WC	(United States) J Isner	6	6^{8}	5
(Russia) I Andreev	3	7^{10}	7
11	(France) R Gasquet	6^{8}	0
(Russia) D Tursunov	7^{10}	6
(United States) S Querrey	6^{3}	1
8	(United Kingdom) A Murray	7^{7}	6

Third round
(Spain) C Moyá	6	7^{7}
(Russia) I Andreev	4	6^{2}
(Russia) D Tursunov	3	3
8	(United Kingdom) A Murray	6	6

Quarterfinals
(Spain) C Moyá	6	3	1
8	(United Kingdom) A Murray	2	6	6

=== Bottom half ===
==== Section 3 ====
First round
LL	(United States) R Ram	6^{5}	4
(France) G Simon	7^{7}	6
(Finland) J Nieminen	6^{7}	2
(Latvia) E Gulbis	7^{9}	6
(Sweden) T Johansson	6^{4}	7^{7}	3
LL	(France) A Clément	7^{7}	6^{5}	6
13	(Chile) F González	3	6	3
(Czech Republic) T Berdych	6	3	6
(Spain) F López	5	5
(Italy) A Seppi	7	7
Q	(South Africa) K Anderson	3	6^{1}
(Italy) S Bolelli	6	7^{7}

Second round
7	(United States) J Blake	6	6
(France) G Simon	4	3
(Latvia) E Gulbis	6	3	7^{7}
LL	(France) A Clément	4	6	6^{5}
(Czech Republic) T Berdych	7	5	5
(Italy) A Seppi	5	7	7
(Italy) S Bolelli	6^{2}	6^{2}
3	(Serbia) N Djokovic	7^{7}	7^{7}

Third round
7	(United States) J Blake	4	6	3
(Latvia) E Gulbis	6	1	6
(Italy) A Seppi	1	2
3	(Serbia) N Djokovic	6	6

Quarterfinals
(Latvia) E Gulbis	3	4
3	(Serbia) N Djokovic	6	6

==== Section 4 ====
First round
(Ecuador) N Lapentti	7^{7}	6
(Croatia) M Čilić	6^{5}	2
WC	(United States) J Levine	3	4
Q	(Australia) C Guccione	6	6
Q	(Dominican Republic) V Estrella	3	5
10	(Spain) F Verdasco	6	7
14	(Russia) M Youzhny	6^{2}	6	4
(Germany) T Haas	7^{7}	2	6
(France) G Monfils	6	6
WC	(United States) D Young	1	1
Q	(Germany) B Becker	6	6^{6}	4
(France) F Serra	4	7^{8}	6

Second round
5	(Spain) D Ferrer	6^{2}	6	3
(Ecuador) N Lapentti	7^{7}	3	6
Q	(Australia) C Guccione	6^{4}	6^{4}
10	(Spain) F Verdasco	7^{7}	7^{7}
(Germany) T Haas	5
(France) G Monfils	1^{r}
(France) F Serra	0	1
2	(Spain) R Nadal	6	6

Third round
(Ecuador) N Lapentti	6	7
10	(Spain) F Verdasco	3	5
(Germany) T Haas	4	6^{0}
2	(Spain) R Nadal	6	7^{7}

Quarterfinals
(Ecuador) N Lapentti	6^{3}	1
2	(Spain) R Nadal	7^{7}	6
