= 2008 International Women's Open – Singles =

Singles
- 2008 International Women's Open

Final
- Champion: (Poland) Agnieszka Radwańska
- Runner-up: (Russia) Nadia Petrova
- Score: 6–4, 6–7^{(11–13)}, 6–4

Details
- Draw: 28
- Seeds: 8

Events
| Singles | Doubles |
| ← 2007 · | International Women's Open | · 2009 → |

Justine Henin was the defending champion, but retired from the sport on May 14, 2008.

Agnieszka Radwańska won the title, defeating Nadia Petrova in the final 6–4, 6–7^{(11–13)}, 6–4.

== Seeds ==
The top four seeds receive a bye into the second round.

1. (Russia) Svetlana Kuznetsova (second round)
2. (France) Marion Bartoli (semifinals)
3. (Russia) Vera Zvonareva (second round)
4. (Poland) Agnieszka Radwańska (champion)
5. (Belarus) Victoria Azarenka (first round, retired due to a knee injury)
6. (France) Alizé Cornet (first round)
7. (Czech Republic) Nicole Vaidišová (first round)
8. (Russia) Nadia Petrova (final)

== Draw ==
=== Key ===
- Q = Qualifier
- WC = Wild card
- LL = Lucky loser
- Alt = Alternate
- ITF = ITF entry
- PR = Protected ranking
- SR = Special ranking
- SE = Special exempt
- JE = Junior exempt
- JR = Junior Accelerator Programme entrant
- CO = College Accelerator Programme entrant
- NG = Next Gen Accelerator Program entrant
- w/o = Walkover
- r = Retired
- d = Defaulted

=== Finals ===
Semifinals
(Australia) Samantha Stosur | 3 | 3
8 | (Russia) Nadia Petrova | 6 | 6
4 | (Poland) Agnieszka Radwańska | 7 | 6
2 | (France) Marion Bartoli | 5 | 3

Final
8 | (Russia) Nadia Petrova | 4 | 7 | 4
4 | (Poland) Agnieszka Radwańska | 6 | 6^{11} | 6

=== Top half ===
First round
(Denmark) C Wozniacki | 6 | 6
Q | (Bulgaria) T Pironkova | 3 | 2
(Australia) S Stosur | 6 | 6
WC | (United Kingdom) K O'Brien | 4 | 3
(France) A Mauresmo | 6 | 4 | 7
6 | (France) A Cornet | 1 | 6 | 5
WC | (Russia) V Dushevina | 3 | 0
Q | (Russia) E Makarova | 6 | 6
(China) N Li | 6 | 6
(Australia) C Dellacqua | 2 | 4
(Israel) S Pe'er | 2 | 2
8 | (Russia) N Petrova | 6 | 6

Second round
1 | (Russia) S Kuznetsova | 2 | 2
(Denmark) C Wozniacki | 6 | 6
(Australia) S Stosur | 1
(France) A Mauresmo | 2 | r
3 | (Russia) V Zvonareva | 3 | 3
Q | (Russia) E Makarova | 6 | 6
(China) N Li | 2 | 7 | 3
8 | (Russia) N Petrova | 6 | 6^{5} | 6

Quarterfinals
(Denmark) C Wozniacki | 6^{3} | 4
(Australia) S Stosur | 7 | 6
Q | (Russia) E Makarova | 4 | 3
8 | (Russia) N Petrova | 6 | 6

Semifinals
(Australia) S Stosur | 3 | 3
8 | (Russia) N Petrova | 6 | 6

=== Bottom half ===
First round
7 | (Czech Republic) N Vaidišová | 2 | 4
(Belarus) O Govortsova | 6 | 6
(Italy) T Garbin | 6 | 4 | 2
(Argentina) G Dulko | 3 | 6 | 6
LL | (Estonia) K Kanepi | 3 | 4
(France) V Razzano | 6 | 6
5 | (Belarus) V Azarenka | 2 | r
(France) A Rezaï | 6
WC | (United Kingdom) M South | 4 | 4
Q | (Russia) A Kleybanova | 6 | 6
Q | (Russia) A Kudryavtseva | 6^{9} | 6 | 5
(Austria) S Bammer | 7 | 1 | 7

Second round
(Belarus) O Govortsova | 1 | 7 | 2
(Argentina) G Dulko | 6 | 6^{3} | 6
(France) V Razzano | 6 | 3 | 4
4 | (Poland) A Radwańska | 3 | 6 | 6
(France) A Rezaï | 3 | 7 | 3
Q | (Russia) A Kleybanova | 6 | 5 | 6
(Austria) S Bammer | 3 | 0
2 | (France) M Bartoli | 6 | 6

Quarterfinals
(Argentina) G Dulko | 5 | 5
4 | (Poland) A Radwańska | 7 | 7
Q | (Russia) A Kleybanova | 3 | 3
2 | (France) M Bartoli | 6 | 6

Semifinals
4 | (Poland) A Radwańska | 7 | 6
2 | (France) M Bartoli | 5 | 3
