= 2009 Ordina Open – Men's singles =

Men's singles
- 2009 Ordina Open

Final
- Champion: (Germany) Benjamin Becker
- Runner-up: (Netherlands) Raemon Sluiter
- Score: 7–5, 6–3

Details
- Draw: 32 (4 Q / 3 WC )
- Seeds: 8

Events
Singles	men	women
Doubles	men	women
← 2008 ·	Ordina Open	· 2010 →

David Ferrer was the defending champion, but lost in the quarterfinals to Iván Navarro.

== Seeds ==
1. (Spain) Fernando Verdasco (second round)
2. (Spain) Tommy Robredo (first round)
3. (Spain) David Ferrer (quarterfinals)
4. (Germany) Rainer Schüttler (semifinals)
5. (Russia) Igor Kunitsyn (second round)
6. (France) Marc Gicquel (second round)
7. (France) Jérémy Chardy (quarterfinals)
8. (Germany) Mischa Zverev (first round, retired)

== Draw ==
=== Key ===
- Q = Qualifier
- WC = Wild card
- LL = Lucky loser
- Alt = Alternate
- SE = Special exempt
- PR = Protected ranking
- ITF = ITF entry
- JE = Junior exempt
- w/o = Walkover
- r = Retired
- d = Defaulted
- SR = Special ranking

=== Finals ===
Semifinals
Q	(Germany) Benjamin Becker	3	7	6
4	(Germany) Rainer Schüttler	6	5	1
(Spain) Iván Navarro	7^{7}	2	3
WC	(Netherlands) Raemon Sluiter	6^{5}	6	6

Final
Q	(Germany) Benjamin Becker	7	6
WC	(Netherlands) Raemon Sluiter	5	3

=== Top half ===
First round
1	(Spain) F Verdasco	6	7
(Spain) P Andújar	3	5
(France) F Serra	3	4
Q	(Germany) B Becker	6	6
Q	(Belgium) K Vliegen	2	7	6
(Czech Republic) J Hernych	6	5	2
(France) M Llodra	4
8	(Germany) M Zverev	1^{r}
4	(Germany) R Schüttler	6	7^{8}
(France) N Devilder	4	6^{6}
Q	(Netherlands) T de Bakker	7^{7}	2	6
(Germany) B Phau	6^{3}	6	3
Q	(Belgium) D Norman	6	6
WC	(Sweden) D Berta	3	3
(Germany) P Petzschner	1	3
7	(France) J Chardy	6	6

Second round
1	(Spain) F Verdasco	5	6^{4}
Q	(Germany) B Becker	7	7^{7}
Q	(Belgium) K Vliegen	2	3
(France) M Llodra	6	6
4	(Germany) R Schüttler	6	7^{7}
Q	(Netherlands) T de Bakker	3	6^{3}
Q	(Belgium) D Norman	6	3	3
7	(France) J Chardy	3	6	6

Quarterfinals
Q	(Germany) B Becker	7^{8}	7
(France) M Llodra	6^{6}	5
4	(Germany) R Schüttler	7^{9}	3	7^{13}
7	(France) J Chardy	6^{7}	6	6^{11}

Semifinals
Q	(Germany) B Becker	3	7	6
4	(Germany) R Schüttler	6	5	1

=== Bottom half ===
First round
6	(France) M Gicquel	6	6
(Belgium) S Darcis	2	3
(Luxembourg) G Müller	5	5
(Spain) I Navarro	7	7
(Spain) Ó Hernández	6	6
(Austria) D Köllerer	3	2
WC	(Netherlands) J Huta Galung	2	5
3	(Spain) D Ferrer	6	7
5	(Russia) I Kunitsyn	6	6
(France) A Clément	2	3
(Belgium) C Rochus	2	4
(Israel) D Sela	6	6
(Spain) D Gimeno-Traver	2	5
WC	(Netherlands) R Sluiter	6	7
(Cyprus) M Baghdatis	7	6
2	(Spain) T Robredo	5	2

Second round
6	(France) M Gicquel	4	6	5
(Spain) I Navarro	6	3	7
(Spain) Ó Hernández	4	3
3	(Spain) D Ferrer	6	6
5	(Russia) I Kunitsyn	4	3
(Israel) D Sela	6	6
WC	(Netherlands) R Sluiter	4
(Cyprus) M Baghdatis	3^{r}

Quarterfinals
(Spain) I Navarro	6	6
3	(Spain) D Ferrer	4	2
(Israel) D Sela	6	4	4
WC	(Netherlands) R Sluiter	4	6	6

Semifinals
(Spain) I Navarro	7^{7}	2	3
WC	(Netherlands) R Sluiter	6^{5}	6	6
