= 2005 Hastings Direct International Championships – Doubles =

Doubles
- 2005 Hastings Direct International Championships

Final
- Champions: (United States) Lisa Raymond (Australia) Rennae Stubbs
- Runners-up: (Russia) Elena Likhovtseva (Russia) Vera Zvonareva
- Score: 6–3, 7–5

Details
- Draw: 16
- Seeds: 4

Events
Singles	Doubles
← 2004 ·	Eastbourne International	· 2006 →

Alicia Molik and Magüi Serna were the defending champions but only Molik competed that year with Bryanne Stewart.

Molik and Stewart lost in the first round to Antonella Serra Zanetti and Abigail Spears.

Lisa Raymond and Rennae Stubbs won in the final 6–3, 7–5 against Elena Likhovtseva and Vera Zvonareva.

== Seeds ==
Champion seeds are indicated in bold text while text in italics indicates the round in which those seeds were eliminated.

1. (Zimbabwe) Cara Black / (South Africa) Liezel Huber (semifinals)
2. (United States) **Lisa Raymond** / (Australia) **Rennae Stubbs (champions)**
3. (Russia) Elena Likhovtseva / (Russia) Vera Zvonareva (final)
4. (Australia) Alicia Molik / (Australia) Bryanne Stewart (first round)

== Draw ==
=== Key ===
- Q = Qualifier
- WC = Wild card
- LL = Lucky loser
- Alt = Alternate
- SE = Special exempt
- PR = Protected ranking
- ITF = ITF entry
- JE = Junior exempt
- w/o = Walkover
- r = Retired
- d = Defaulted
- SR = Special ranking

First round
1	(Zimbabwe) **C Black** (South Africa) **L Huber**	**6**	2	**6**
(United States) J Craybas (Germany) M Weingärtner	4	**6**	3
(Bulgaria) M Maleeva (Russia) A Myskina	2	4
(Slovenia) **K Srebotnik** (Thailand) **T Tanasugarn**	**6**	**6**
3	(Russia) **E Likhovtseva** (Russia) **V Zvonareva**	**6**	2	**6**
WC	(France) N Dechy (France) A Mauresmo	2	**6**	1
(Switzerland) **E Gagliardi** (Italy) **R Vinci**	**7^{8}**	4	**7^{8}**
(Spain) C Martínez (Tunisia) S Sfar	6^{6}	**6**	6^{6}
(Greece) E Daniilidou (Australia) N Pratt	1	3
(Slovakia) **D Hantuchová** (Japan) **A Sugiyama**	**6**	**6**
Q	(Italy) **A Serra Zanetti** (United States) **A Spears**	**7^{7}**	**6**
4	(Australia) A Molik (Australia) B Stewart	6^{4}	2
(Ukraine) **T Perebiynis** (Venezuela) **M Vento-Kabchi**	**7^{7}**	**6**
WC	(United Kingdom) E Baltacha (United Kingdom) J O'Donoghue	6^{2}	4
(France) M Bartoli (United States) M Washington	3	5
2	(United States) **L Raymond** (Australia) **R Stubbs**	**6**	**7**

Quarterfinals
1	(Zimbabwe) **C Black** (South Africa) **L Huber**	**6**	**6**
(Slovenia) K Srebotnik (Thailand) T Tanasugarn	1	2
3	(Russia) **E Likhovtseva** (Russia) **V Zvonareva**	**w/o**
(Switzerland) E Gagliardi (Italy) R Vinci
(Slovakia) D Hantuchová (Japan) A Sugiyama	**7^{7}**	4	5
Q	(Italy) **A Serra Zanetti** (United States) **A Spears**	6^{1}	**6**	**7**
(Ukraine) T Perebiynis (Venezuela) M Vento-Kabchi	0	4
2	(United States) **L Raymond** (Australia) **R Stubbs**	**6**	**6**

Semifinals
1	(Zimbabwe) C Black (South Africa) L Huber	3	**6**	2
3	(Russia) **E Likhovtseva** (Russia) **V Zvonareva**	**6**	4	**6**
Q	(Italy) A Serra Zanetti (United States) A Spears	3	4
2	(United States) **L Raymond** (Australia) **R Stubbs**	**6**	**6**

Final
3	(Russia) Elena Likhovtseva (Russia) Vera Zvonareva	3	5
2	(United States) **Lisa Raymond** (Australia) **Rennae Stubbs**	**6**	**7**
