= 2008 Western & Southern Financial Group Women's Open – Singles =

Singles
- 2008 Western & Southern Financial Group Women's Open

Final
- Champion: (Russia) Nadia Petrova
- Runner-up: (France) Nathalie Dechy
- Score: 6–2, 6–1

Details
- Draw: 32
- Seeds: 8

Events
Singles	Doubles
- Western & Southern Financial Group Women's Open

Anna Chakvetadze was the defending champion, but chose not to participate that year.

Nadia Petrova won in the final 6–2, 6–1, against Nathalie Dechy.

== Seeds ==
1. (France) Marion Bartoli (first round, retired due to an abdominal pain)
2. (Russia) Nadia Petrova (champion)
3. (Russia) Maria Kirilenko (semifinals)
4. (Slovenia) Katarina Srebotnik (second round)
5. (France) Amélie Mauresmo (semifinals)
6. (Canada) Aleksandra Wozniak (quarterfinals)
7. (Russia) Ekaterina Makarova (first round)
8. (Austria) Tamira Paszek (first round)

== Draw ==
Key

- Q = Qualifier
- WC = Wild card
- LL = Lucky loser
- Alt = Alternate
- ITF = ITF entry
- PR = Protected ranking
- SR = Special ranking
- SE = Special exempt
- JE = Junior exempt
- JR = Junior Accelerator Programme entrant
- CO = College Accelerator Programme entrant
- NG = Next Gen Accelerator Program entrant
- w/o = Walkover
- r = Retired
- d = Defaulted

=== Finals ===
Semifinals
5	(France) Amélie Mauresmo	4	6	2
(France) Nathalie Dechy	6	3	6
3	(Russia) Maria Kirilenko	6	2	1
2	(Russia) Nadia Petrova	1	6	6

Final
(France) Nathalie Dechy	2	1
2	(Russia) Nadia Petrova	6	6

=== Top half ===
First round
1	(France) M Bartoli	6^{5}	2	r
WC	(United States) J Jackson	7	2
(Italy) T Garbin	6	3	5
(United States) V King	4	6	7
(Russia) V Bardina	5	6	3
(Belgium) Y Wickmayer	7	3	6
(France) S Cohen-Aloro	7	6^{6}	1
5	(France) A Mauresmo	6^{5}	7	6
4	(Slovenia) K Srebotnik	6	6
(United States) A Fink	3	3
(France) N Dechy	6	6
(France) O Sanchez	2	2
(Ukraine) J Vakulenko	6	2	6
(Romania) M Niculescu	2	6	4
(Japan) A Nakamura	3	2
6	(Canada) A Wozniak	6	6

Second round
WC	(United States) J Jackson	1	4
(United States) V King	6	6
(Belgium) Y Wickmayer	3	1
5	(France) A Mauresmo	6	6
4	(Slovenia) K Srebotnik	5	6	6^{1}
(France) N Dechy	7	2	7
(Ukraine) J Vakulenko	2	3
6	(Canada) A Wozniak	6	6

Quarterfinals
(United States) V King	2	4
5	(France) A Mauresmo	6	6
(France) N Dechy	7	7
6	(Canada) A Wozniak	6^{4}	5

Semifinals
5	(France) A Mauresmo	4	6	2
(France) N Dechy	6	3	6

=== Bottom half ===
First round
7	(Russia) E Makarova	2	0
(France) C Pin	6	6
(Germany) S Lisicki	5	7	6
(Georgia (country)) A Tatishvili	7	5	0
Q	(Canada) S Dubois	6	7
Q	(Russia) E Rodina	2	6^{3}
Q	(Chinese Taipei) S-w Hsieh	2	5
3	(Russia) M Kirilenko	6	7
8	(Austria) T Paszek	6	3	1^{r}
(Czech Republic) P Cetkovská	4	6	4
(United Kingdom) A Keothavong	6^{3}	6	4
WC	(United States) L Osterloh	7	4	6
(United States) J Ditty	2	6	6
Q	(China) M Yuan	6	1	4
(Russia) G Voskoboeva	3	0
2	(Russia) N Petrova	6	6

Second round
(France) C Pin	3	4
(Germany) S Lisicki	6	6
Q	(Canada) S Dubois	6	2	5
3	(Russia) M Kirilenko	1	6	7
(Czech Republic) P Cetkovská	4	1
WC	(United States) L Osterloh	6	6
(United States) J Ditty	1	1
2	(Russia) N Petrova	6	6

Quarterfinals
(Germany) S Lisicki	2	6	1
3	(Russia) M Kirilenko	6	1	6
WC	(United States) L Osterloh	2	3
2	(Russia) N Petrova	6	6

Semifinals
3	(Russia) M Kirilenko	6	2	1
2	(Russia) N Petrova	1	6	6
