= 2005 Hastings Direct International Championships – Singles =

Singles
- 2005 Hastings Direct International Championships

Final
- Champion: (Belgium) Kim Clijsters
- Runner-up: (Russia) Vera Douchevina
- Score: 7–5, 6–0

Details
- Draw: 28
- Seeds: 8

Events
Singles	Doubles
← 2004 ·	Eastbourne International	· 2006 →

The singles competition of the 2005 Hastings Direct International Championships was part of the 31st edition of the Eastbourne International tennis tournament, Tier II of the 2005 WTA Tour. Svetlana Kuznetsova was the defending champion but lost in the semifinals to Kim Clijsters. Clijsters won in the final 7–5, 6–0 against Vera Douchevina.

== Seeds ==
A champion seed is indicated in bold text while text in italics indicates the round in which that seed was eliminated. The top four seeds received a bye to the second round.

1. (France) Amélie Mauresmo (second round)
2. (Russia) Svetlana Kuznetsova (semifinals)
3. (Australia) Alicia Molik (withdrew)
4. (Russia) Anastasia Myskina (quarterfinals)
5. (Russia) Vera Zvonareva (second round)
6. (Russia) Elena Likhovtseva (first round)
7. (Belgium) **Kim Clijsters (champion)**
8. (France) Nathalie Dechy (quarterfinals)

== Draw ==
=== Key ===
- Q = Qualifier
- WC = Wild card
- LL = Lucky loser
- Alt = Alternate
- ITF = ITF entry
- PR = Protected ranking
- SR = Special ranking
- SE = Special exempt
- JE = Junior exempt
- JR = Junior Accelerator Programme entrant
- CO = College Accelerator Programme entrant
- NG = Next Gen Accelerator Program entrant
- w/o = Walkover
- r = Retired
- d = Defaulted

=== Final ===
Final
Q	(Russia) Vera Douchevina	5	0
7	(Belgium) **Kim Clijsters**	**7**	**6**

=== Top half ===
First round
Q	(Slovenia) K Srebotnik	**6**	2	2
Q	(Russia) **V Douchevina**	1	**6**	**6**
(Japan) S Asagoe	1	2
LL	(United States) **L Raymond**	**6**	**6**
(France) **M Bartoli**	**7^{10}**	**6**
6	(Russia) E Likhovtseva	6^{8}	2
LL	(Venezuela) **M Vento-Kabchi**	**6**	4	**6**
(Slovakia) D Hantuchová	2	**6**	4
Q	(Italy) **R Vinci**	**6**	4	**6**
(Croatia) K Šprem	3	**6**	3
(Czech Republic) N Vaidišová	3	2
5	(Russia) **V Zvonareva**	**6**	**6**

Second round
1	(France) A Mauresmo	4	4
Q	(Russia) **V Douchevina**	**6**	**6**
LL	(United States) L Raymond	3	4
(France) **M Bartoli**	**6**	**6**
4	(Russia) **A Myskina**	**6**	5	**6**
LL	(Venezuela) M Vento-Kabchi	4	**7**	0
Q	(Italy) **R Vinci**	**6**	**7^{7}**
5	(Russia) V Zvonareva	2	6^{5}

Quarterfinals
Q	(Russia) **V Douchevina**	**5**
(France) M Bartoli	0	r
4	(Russia) A Myskina	4	6^{3}
Q	(Italy) **R Vinci**	**6**	**7^{7}**

Semifinals
Q	(Russia) **V Douchevina**	2	**7^{8}**	**6**
Q	(Italy) R Vinci	**6**	6^{6}	3

=== Bottom half ===
First round
7	(Belgium) **K Clijsters**	**6**	**7^{7}**
(Serbia and Montenegro) J Janković	1	6^{2}
WC	(Spain) **C Martínez**	**7**	2	**6**
WC	(United Kingdom) E Baltacha	5	**6**	1
(France) **V Razzano**	**6**	4	**6**
(Italy) S Farina Elia	3	**6**	4
8	(France) **N Dechy**	**6**	**6**
WC	(United Kingdom) A Janes	1	1
(Japan) A Sugiyama	**6**	5	4
(United States) **A Frazier**	4	**7**	**6**
Q	(Russia) **A Chakvetadze**	6^{0}	**6**	**6**
(Bulgaria) M Maleeva	**7^{7}**	1	2

Second round
7	(Belgium) **K Clijsters**	**6**	**6**
WC	(Spain) C Martínez	2	2
(France) V Razzano	6^{4}	4
LL	(United States) **M Washington**	**7^{7}**	**6**
8	(France) **N Dechy**	4	**6**	**6**
(United States) A Frazier	**6**	3	3
Q	(Russia) A Chakvetadze	**6**	4	6^{5}
2	(Russia) **S Kuznetsova**	1	**6**	**7^{7}**

Quarterfinals
7	(Belgium) **K Clijsters**	**6**	**6**
LL	(United States) M Washington	2	2
8	(France) N Dechy	4	5
2	(Russia) **S Kuznetsova**	**6**	**7**

Semifinals
7	(Belgium) **K Clijsters**	**6**	3	**6**
2	(Russia) S Kuznetsova	4	**6**	4
