= 2008 Ordina Open – Men's doubles =

Men's doubles
- 2008 Ordina Open

Final
- Champions: (Croatia) Mario Ančić (Austria) Jürgen Melzer
- Runners-up: (India) Mahesh Bhupathi (India) Leander Paes
- Score: 7–6(5), 6–3

Events
Singles	men	women
Doubles	men	women
← 2007 ·	Ordina Open	· 2009 →

Jeff Coetzee and Rogier Wassen were the defending champions, but Coetzee chose not to participate, and only Wassen competed that year.
Wassen partnered with Jean-Claude Scherrer, but lost in the first round to Steve Darcis and Marc Gicquel.

Mario Ančić and Jürgen Melzer won in the final 7–6(5), 6–3, against Mahesh Bhupathi and Leander Paes.

== Seeds ==
1. (Czech Republic) Martin Damm / (Czech Republic) Pavel Vízner (quarterfinals)
2. (India) Mahesh Bhupathi / (India) Leander Paes (final)
3. (Czech Republic) František Čermák / (Australia) Jordan Kerr (first round)
4. (India) Rohan Bopanna / (Sweden) Robert Lindstedt (first round)

== Draw ==
=== Key ===
- Q = Qualifier
- WC = Wild card
- LL = Lucky loser
- Alt = Alternate
- SE = Special exempt
- PR = Protected ranking
- ITF = ITF entry
- JE = Junior exempt
- w/o = Walkover
- r = Retired
- d = Defaulted
- SR = Special ranking

=== Draw ===
First round
1	(Czech Republic) M Damm (Czech Republic) P Vízner	6	6
(Austria) O Marach (Slovakia) M Mertiňák	3	4
(Switzerland) J-C Scherrer (Netherlands) R Wassen	0	4
(Belgium) S Darcis (France) M Gicquel	6	6
3	(Czech Republic) F Čermák (Australia) J Kerr	6^{8}	5
(Croatia) M Ančić (Austria) J Melzer	7	7
WC	(Netherlands) R Haase (Netherlands) I Sijsling	4	7	[5]
(Czech Republic) J Levinský (Czech Republic) D Škoch	6	5	[10]
(France) A Clément (France) F Serra	6	7
WC	(Netherlands) J Huta Galung (Netherlands) M Verkerk	4	6^{7}
(Argentina) G Cañas (Argentina) JM del Potro	6	6
4	(India) R Bopanna (Sweden) R Lindstedt	2	1
(Germany) C Kas (Croatia) L Zovko	6	3	[8]
(Spain) D Ferrer (Spain) M Granollers	4	6	[10]
(Switzerland) Y Allegro (Argentina) S Prieto	3	6^{3}
2	(India) M Bhupathi (India) L Paes	6	7

Quarterfinals
1	(Czech Republic) M Damm (Czech Republic) P Vízner	6	6^{5}	[9]
(Belgium) S Darcis (France) M Gicquel	3	7	[11]
(Croatia) M Ančić (Austria) J Melzer	6	6
(Czech Republic) J Levinský (Czech Republic) D Škoch	3	1
(France) A Clément (France) F Serra	0	2
(Argentina) G Cañas (Argentina) JM del Potro	6	6
(Spain) D Ferrer (Spain) M Granollers	2	1
2	(India) M Bhupathi (India) L Paes	6	6

Semifinals
(Belgium) S Darcis (France) M Gicquel	6^{6}	6^{2}
(Croatia) M Ančić (Austria) J Melzer	7	7
(Argentina) G Cañas (Argentina) JM del Potro	7	3	[7]
2	(India) M Bhupathi (India) L Paes	6^{6}	6	[10]

Final
(Croatia) M Ančić (Austria) J Melzer	7	6
2	(India) M Bhupathi (India) L Paes	6^{5}	3
