= 2007 Hastings Direct International Championships – Doubles =

Doubles
- 2007 Hastings Direct International Championships

Final
- Champions: (United States) Lisa Raymond (Australia) Samantha Stosur
- Runners-up: (Czech Republic) Květa Peschke (Australia) Rennae Stubbs
- Score: 6–7^{(5–7)}, 6–4, 6–3

Details
- Draw: 16
- Seeds: 4

Events
Singles	Doubles
← 2006 ·	Eastbourne International	· 2008 →

Svetlana Kuznetsova and Amélie Mauresmo were the defending champions but did not compete that year.

Lisa Raymond and Samantha Stosur won in the final 6–7^{(5–7)}, 6–4, 6–3 against Květa Peschke and Rennae Stubbs.

== Seeds ==
A champion seed is indicated in bold text while text in italics indicates the round in which that seed was eliminated.

1. (United States) **Lisa Raymond** / (Australia) **Samantha Stosur (champions)**
2. (Zimbabwe) Cara Black / (South Africa) Liezel Huber (semifinals)
3. (Czech Republic) Květa Peschke / (Australia) Rennae Stubbs (final)
4. (Australia) Alicia Molik / (Italy) Mara Santangelo (first round)

== Draw ==
=== Key ===
- Q = Qualifier
- WC = Wild card
- LL = Lucky loser
- Alt = Alternate
- ITF = ITF entry
- PR = Protected ranking
- SR = Special ranking
- SE = Special exempt
- JE = Junior exempt
- JR = Junior Accelerator Programme entrant
- CO = College Accelerator Programme entrant
- NG = Next Gen Accelerator Program entrant
- w/o = Walkover
- r = Retired
- d = Defaulted

First round
1	(United States) **L Raymond** (Australia) **S Stosur**	**6**	**6**
(China) C Ji (China) S Sun	1	2
(United States) J Craybas (Poland) A Radwańska	4	6^{3}
(United States) **L Granville** (Czech Republic) **V Uhlířová**	**6**	**7^{7}**
4	(Australia) A Molik (Italy) M Santangelo	2	**6**	4
(France) **N Dechy** (China) **T Sun**	**6**	4	**6**
WC	(United Kingdom) C Curran (United Kingdom) A Keothavong	6^{4}	3
(Russia) **M Kirilenko** (Russia) **E Likhovtseva**	**7^{7}**	**6**
(Czech Republic) E Birnerová (Germany) A Grönefeld	2	4
(Russia) **V Dushevina** (Japan) **A Sugiyama**	**6**	**6**
(Italy) T Garbin (Israel) S Pe'er	1	3
3	(Czech Republic) **K Peschke** (Australia) **R Stubbs**	**6**	**6**
(Poland) K Jans (Poland) A Rosolska	**7^{8}**	1	2
(Slovakia) **J Gajdošová** (Japan) **A Morigami**	6^{6}	**6**	**6**
(United States) B Mattek (Australia) B Stewart	3	0
2	(Zimbabwe) **C Black** (South Africa) **L Huber**	**6**	**6**

Quarterfinals
1	(United States) **L Raymond** (Australia) **S Stosur**	**6**	**7^{7}**
(United States) L Granville (Czech Republic) V Uhlířová	4	6^{4}
(France) N Dechy (China) T Sun
(Russia) **M Kirilenko** (Russia) **E Likhovtseva**	**w/o**
(Russia) V Dushevina (Japan) A Sugiyama	1	5
3	(Czech Republic) **K Peschke** (Australia) **R Stubbs**	**6**	**7**
(Slovakia) J Gajdošová (Japan) A Morigami	1	0
2	(Zimbabwe) **C Black** (South Africa) **L Huber**	**6**	**6**

Semifinals
1	(United States) **L Raymond** (Australia) **S Stosur**	**6**	**6**
(Russia) M Kirilenko (Russia) E Likhovtseva	2	0
3	(Czech Republic) **K Peschke** (Australia) **R Stubbs**	**6**	2	**7^{7}**
2	(Zimbabwe) C Black (South Africa) L Huber	3	**6**	6^{4}

Final
1	(United States) **Lisa Raymond** (Australia) **Samantha Stosur**	6^{5}	**6**	**6**
3	(Czech Republic) Květa Peschke (Australia) Rennae Stubbs	**7^{7}**	4	3
