= 2008 International Women's Open – Doubles =

Doubles
- 2008 International Women's Open

Final
- Champions: (Zimbabwe) Cara Black (United States) Liezel Huber
- Runners-up: (Czech Republic) Květa Peschke (Australia) Rennae Stubbs
- Score: 2–6, 6–0, 10–8

Details
- Draw: 16
- Seeds: 4

Events
Singles	Doubles
← 2007 ·	Eastbourne International	· 2009 →

Lisa Raymond and Samantha Stosur were the defending champions, but lost in the quarterfinals to Květa Peschke and Rennae Stubbs.

Cara Black and Liezel Huber won in the final 2–6, 6–0, 10–8, against Květa Peschke and Rennae Stubbs.

== Seeds ==
1. (Zimbabwe) Cara Black / (United States) Liezel Huber (champions)
2. (Czech Republic) Květa Peschke / (Australia) Rennae Stubbs (final)
3. (Israel) Shahar Pe'er / (Spain) Virginia Ruano Pascual (first round)
4. (United States) Bethanie Mattek / (Czech Republic) Vladimíra Uhlířová (first round)

== Draw ==
=== Key ===
- Q = Qualifier
- WC = Wild card
- LL = Lucky loser
- Alt = Alternate
- SE = Special exempt
- PR = Protected ranking
- ITF = ITF entry
- JE = Junior exempt
- w/o = Walkover
- r = Retired
- d = Defaulted
- SR = Special ranking

=== Draw ===
First round
1	(Zimbabwe) C Black (United States) L Huber	6	6
(Romania) E Gallovits (Romania) M Niculescu	2	0
(France) N Dechy (Australia) C Dellacqua	4	4
(Russia) A Kleybanova (Russia) G Voskoboeva	6	6
4	(United States) B Mattek (Czech Republic) V Uhlířová	4	0
(United States) J Craybas (Belarus) O Govortsova	6	6
WC	(United Kingdom) E Baltacha (United Kingdom) N Cavaday	6^{2}	0
(South Africa) N Grandin (Tunisia) S Sfar	7	6
(Russia) V Dushevina (Poland) A Rosolska	6	6
ALT	(Colombia) C Castaño (Italy) T Garbin	2	4
(United States) V King (Russia) A Kudryavtseva	7	5	[10]
3	(Israel) S Pe'er (Spain) V Ruano Pascual	6^{3}	7	[6]
(Argentina) G Dulko (Slovakia) J Husárová	1	6	[6]
(United States) L Raymond (Australia) S Stosur	6	3	[10]
WC	(Russia) S Kuznetsova (France) A Mauresmo	1	2
2	(Czech Republic) K Peschke (Australia) R Stubbs	6	6

Quarterfinals
1	(Zimbabwe) C Black (United States) L Huber	7	7
(Russia) A Kleybanova (Russia) G Voskoboeva	5	5
(United States) J Craybas (Belarus) O Govortsova	2	6	[10]
(South Africa) N Grandin (Tunisia) S Sfar	6	4	[2]
(Russia) V Dushevina (Poland) A Rosolska	6	6
(United States) V King (Russia) A Kudryavtseva	3	3
(United States) L Raymond (Australia) S Stosur	1	2
2	(Czech Republic) K Peschke (Australia) R Stubbs	6	6

Semifinals
1	(Zimbabwe) C Black (United States) L Huber	6	6
(United States) J Craybas (Belarus) O Govortsova	1	4
(Russia) V Dushevina (Poland) A Rosolska	2	6^{5}
2	(Czech Republic) K Peschke (Australia) R Stubbs	6	7

Final
1	(Zimbabwe) C Black (United States) L Huber	2	6	[10]
2	(Czech Republic) K Peschke (Australia) R Stubbs	6	0	[8]
