= 2006 Hastings Direct International Championships – Singles =

Singles
- 2006 Hastings Direct International Championships
- 2005 Champion: (Belgium) Kim Clijsters

Final
- Champion: (Belgium) Justine Henin-Hardenne
- Runner-up: (Russia) Anastasia Myskina
- Score: 4–6, 6–1, 7–6^{(7–5)}

Details
- Draw: 28
- Seeds: 8

Events
Singles	Doubles
← 2005 ·	Eastbourne International	· 2007 →

The singles competition of the 2006 Hastings Direct International Championships was part of the 32nd edition of the Eastbourne International tennis tournament, Tier II of the 2006 WTA Tour. Kim Clijsters was the defending champion but lost in the semifinals to Justine Henin-Hardenne. Henin-Hardenne won in the final 4–6, 6–1, 7–6^{(7–5)} against Anastasia Myskina.

== Seeds ==
A champion seed is indicated in bold text while text in italics indicates the round in which that seed was eliminated. The top four seeds received a bye to the second round.

1. (France) Amélie Mauresmo (second round)
2. (Belgium) Kim Clijsters (semifinals)
3. (Belgium) **Justine Henin-Hardenne (champion)**
4. (Russia) Svetlana Kuznetsova (semifinals)
5. (Russia) Anastasia Myskina (final)
6. (Italy) Francesca Schiavone (quarterfinals)
7. (Germany) Anna-Lena Grönefeld (quarterfinals)
8. (Slovakia) Daniela Hantuchová (first round)

== Draw ==
=== Key ===
- Q = Qualifier
- WC = Wild card
- LL = Lucky loser
- Alt = Alternate
- ITF = ITF entry
- PR = Protected ranking
- SR = Special ranking
- SE = Special exempt
- JE = Junior exempt
- JR = Junior Accelerator Programme entrant
- CO = College Accelerator Programme entrant
- NG = Next Gen Accelerator Program entrant
- w/o = Walkover
- r = Retired
- d = Defaulted

=== Final ===
Final
5	(Russia) Anastasia Myskina	**6**	1	6^{5}
3	(Belgium) **Justine Henin-Hardenne**	4	**6**	**7^{7}**

=== Section 1 ===
First round
(France) **N Dechy**	**6**	**6**
(Israel) S Pe'er	1	4
(United States) **J Craybas**	**6**	**6**
(Sweden) S Arvidsson	3	1
Q	(Slovakia) J Gajdošová	3	0
5	(Russia) **A Myskina**	**6**	**6**
(Japan) **A Sugiyama**	**7^{7}**	4	**5**
(Slovenia) K Srebotnik	6^{5}	**6**	1/r
WC	(United Kingdom) A Keothavong	1	3
(Russia) **V Dushevina**	**6**	**6**
(France) M Bartoli	**6**	4	2
7	(Germany) **A-L Grönefeld**	2	**6**	**6**

Second round
1	(France) A Mauresmo	**6**	2	3
(France) **N Dechy**	3	**6**	**6**
(United States) J Craybas	4	4
5	(Russia) **A Myskina**	**6**	**6**
4	(Russia) **S Kuznetsova**	1	**6**	**6**
(Japan) A Sugiyama	**6**	1	2
(Russia) V Dushevina	4	1
7	(Germany) **A-L Grönefeld**	**6**	**6**

Quarterfinals
(France) N Dechy	4	4
5	(Russia) **A Myskina**	**6**	**6**
4	(Russia) **S Kuznetsova**	5	**7**	**7^{7}**
7	(Germany) A-L Grönefeld	**7**	5	6^{4}

Semifinals
5	(Russia) **A Myskina**	**6**	2	**6**
4	(Russia) S Kuznetsova	4	**6**	4

=== Section 2 ===
First round
8	(Slovakia) D Hantuchová	4	6^{3}
(Russia) **E Likhovtseva**	**6**	**7^{7}**
(Colombia) C Castaño	3	4
Q	(United States) **S Perry**	**6**	**6**
(Italy) M Santangelo	4	**6**	5
(Czech Republic) **K Peschke**	**6**	4	**7**
6	(Italy) **F Schiavone**	**6**	**6**
WC	(United Kingdom) K O'Brien	3	1
Q	(Japan) **A Morigami**	**6**	**6**
Q	(United States) L Raymond	4	4
(Russia) A Chakvetadze	6^{3}	**7^{7}**	2
(Russia) **V Zvonareva**	**7^{7}**	6^{2}	**6**

Second round
(Russia) **E Likhovtseva**	4	**6**	**6**
Q	(United States) S Perry	**6**	1	3
(Czech Republic) K Peschke	2	1
3	(Belgium) **J Henin-Hardenne**	**6**	**6**
6	(Italy) **F Schiavone**	**6**	**6**
Q	(Japan) A Morigami	0	2
(Russia) V Zvonareva	0	r
2	(Belgium) **K Clijsters**	**3**

Quarterfinals
(Russia) E Likhovtseva	2	4
3	(Belgium) **J Henin-Hardenne**	**6**	**6**
6	(Italy) F Schiavone	2	1
2	(Belgium) **K Clijsters**	**6**	**6**

Semifinals
3	(Belgium) **J Henin-Hardenne**	**6**	5	**6**
2	(Belgium) K Clijsters	3	**7**	1
