= 2008 Western & Southern Financial Group Women's Open – Doubles =

Doubles
- 2008 Western & Southern Financial Group Women's Open

Final
- Champions: (Russia) Maria Kirilenko; (Russia) Nadia Petrova
- Runners-up: (Chinese Taipei) Su-wei Hsieh; (Russia) Yaroslava Shvedova
- Score: 6–3, 4–6, [10–8]

Details
- Draw: 16
- Seeds: 4

Events
Singles	Doubles
- Western & Southern Financial Group Women's Open

Bethanie Mattek and Sania Mirza were the defending champions, but Mattek chose not to participate, while Mirza chose to compete in the Beijing Summer Olympics instead.

Maria Kirilenko and Nadia Petrova won in the final 6–3, 4–6, [10–8], against Su-wei Hsieh and Yaroslava Shvedova.

== Seeds ==
1. (Chinese Taipei) Su-wei Hsieh / (Russia) Yaroslava Shvedova (final)
2. (Russia) Maria Kirilenko / (Russia) Nadia Petrova (champions)
3. (Germany) Jasmin Wöhr / (Czech Republic) Barbora Záhlavová-Strýcová (semifinals)
4. (Canada) Stéphanie Dubois / (Russia) Ekaterina Makarova (first round)

== Draw ==
Key

- Q = Qualifier
- WC = Wild card
- LL = Lucky loser
- Alt = Alternate
- ITF = ITF entry
- PR = Protected ranking
- SR = Special ranking
- SE = Special exempt
- JE = Junior exempt
- JR = Junior Accelerator Programme entrant
- CO = College Accelerator Programme entrant
- NG = Next Gen Accelerator Program entrant
- w/o = Walkover
- r = Retired
- d = Defaulted

=== Draw ===
First round

Quarterfinals

Semifinals

Final

1
- (Chinese Taipei) S-w Hsieh
- (Russia) Y Shvedova
6
5
[10]

- (United States) J Ditty
- (South Africa) N Grandin
2
7
[8]

1
- (Chinese Taipei) S-w Hsieh
- (Russia) Y Shvedova
7
6

- (Argentina) J Cravero
- (Germany) M Müller
2
4

- (Czech Republic) P Cetkovská
- (Russia) G Voskoboeva
5
4

- (Czech Republic) P Cetkovská
- (Russia) G Voskoboeva
6
6

1
- (Chinese Taipei) S-w Hsieh
- (Russia) Y Shvedova
6
6

4
- (Canada) S Dubois
- (Russia) E Makarova
6
3
[4]

- (United States) M Brengle
- (United States) K Frilling
1
1

- (United States) M Brengle
- (United States) K Frilling
1
6
[10]

- (United States) M Brengle
- (United States) K Frilling
6
4
[10]

- (Italy) T Garbin
- (United States) M Washington
6
6

- (Italy) T Garbin
- (United States) M Washington
4
6
[5]

- (Hungary) M Czink
- (Latvia) L Dekmeijere
3
3

1
- (Chinese Taipei) S-w Hsieh
- (Russia) Y Shvedova
3
6
[8]

- (Russia) M Kondratieva
- (France) S Lefèvre
3
4

2
- (Russia) M Kirilenko
- (Russia) N Petrova
6
4
[10]

- (Ukraine) O Savchuk
- (Turkey) İ Şenoğlu
6
6

- (Ukraine) O Savchuk
- (Turkey) İ Şenoğlu
6
4
[4]

- (United States) L Osterloh
- (Russia) E Rodina
1
0

3
- (Germany) J Wöhr
- (Czech Republic) B Záhlavová-Strýcová
1
6
[10]

3
- (Germany) J Wöhr
- (Czech Republic) B Záhlavová-Strýcová
6
6

3
- (Germany) J Wöhr
- (Czech Republic) B Záhlavová-Strýcová
6
3
[4]

- (United States) C Fusano
- (United States) C Nagle
1
5

2
- (Russia) M Kirilenko
- (Russia) N Petrova
2
6
[10]

- (Slovenia) A Klepač
- (Japan) A Nakamura
6
7

- (Slovenia) A Klepač
- (Japan) A Nakamura
3
3

- (United Kingdom) A Keothavong
- (Romania) M Niculescu
0
6
[4]

2
- (Russia) M Kirilenko
- (Russia) N Petrova
6
6

2
- (Russia) M Kirilenko
- (Russia) N Petrova
6
3
[10]
