= 2009 Ordina Open – Women's singles =

Women's singles
- 2009 Ordina Open

Final
- Champion: (Thailand) Tamarine Tanasugarn
- Runner-up: (Belgium) Yanina Wickmayer
- Score: 6–3, 7–5

Details
- Draw: 32 (4 Q / 3 WC )
- Seeds: 8

Events
Singles	men	women
Doubles	men	women
- Ordina Open

Unseeded defending champion Tamarine Tanasugarn successfully retained her title, by defeating Yanina Wickmayer 6–3, 7–5 in the final.

== Seeds ==
1. (Russia) Dinara Safina (semifinals)
2. (Slovakia) Dominika Cibulková (first round)
3. (Italy) Flavia Pennetta (quarterfinals)
4. (Romania) Sorana Cîrstea (second round)
5. (Ukraine) Alona Bondarenko (second round)
6. (Slovakia) Daniela Hantuchová (quarterfinals)
7. (Czech Republic) Iveta Benešová (second round)
8. (Russia) Elena Vesnina (first round)

== Draw ==
Key

- Q = Qualifier
- WC = Wild card
- LL = Lucky loser
- Alt = Alternate
- ITF = ITF entry
- PR = Protected ranking
- SR = Special ranking
- SE = Special exempt
- JE = Junior exempt
- JR = Junior Accelerator Programme entrant
- CO = College Accelerator Programme entrant
- NG = Next Gen Accelerator Program entrant
- w/o = Walkover
- r = Retired
- d = Defaulted

=== Finals ===
Semifinals
1	(Russia) Dinara Safina	5	5
(Thailand) Tamarine Tanasugarn	7	7
WC	(Belgium) Yanina Wickmayer	7	2	6
(Italy) Francesca Schiavone	6^{3}	6	3

Final
(Thailand) Tamarine Tanasugarn	6	7
WC	(Belgium) Yanina Wickmayer	3	5

=== Top half ===
First round
1	(Russia) D Safina	6	6
(Germany) A-L Grönefeld	0	3
(Austria) P Mayr	2	0
Q	(Kazakhstan) Y Shvedova	6	6
(Ukraine) K Bondarenko	6	3	6
Q	(Belgium) K Flipkens	4	6	3
(Italy) R Vinci	6^{2}	4
6/WC	(Slovakia) D Hantuchová	7	6
3	(Italy) F Pennetta	6	6
(Chinese Taipei) Y-j Chan	4	2
(Czech Republic) P Cetkovská	5	6^{6}
Q	(Russia) K Pervak	7	7
(Czech Republic) B Záhlavová-Strýcová	1	3
(Thailand) T Tanasugarn	6	6
(Italy) M Santangelo	2	3
7	(Czech Republic) I Benešová	6	6

Second round
1	(Russia) D Safina	6	6
Q	(Kazakhstan) Y Shvedova	3	3
(Ukraine) K Bondarenko	6	2	1
6/WC	(Slovakia) D Hantuchová	2	6	6
3	(Italy) F Pennetta	6	6
Q	(Russia) K Pervak	1	1
(Thailand) T Tanasugarn	6	6
7	(Czech Republic) I Benešová	3	1

Quarterfinals
1	(Russia) D Safina	1	6	6
6/WC	(Slovakia) D Hantuchová	6	4	3
3	(Italy) F Pennetta	6	3	3
(Thailand) T Tanasugarn	2	6	6

Semifinals
1	(Russia) D Safina	5	5
(Thailand) T Tanasugarn	7	7

=== Bottom half ===
First round
8	(Russia) E Vesnina	4	3
(Germany) K Barrois	6	6
WC	(Netherlands) M Krajicek	6	6
(Italy) S Errani	4	2
WC	(Belgium) Y Wickmayer	6	6
Q	(Italy) ME Camerin	1	3
(Romania) M Niculescu	7	3	3
4	(Romania) S Cîrstea	5	6	6
5	(Ukraine) A Bondarenko	6	6^{1}	6
LL	(France) S Foretz	4	7	3
(France) J Coin	2	2
(Italy) F Schiavone	6	6
LL	(France) S Brémond	2	1
(Belarus) O Govortsova	6	6
(France) N Dechy	6	3	6
2	(Slovakia) D Cibulková	3	6	3

Second round
(Germany) K Barrois	6	6
WC	(Netherlands) M Krajicek	4	3
WC	(Belgium) Y Wickmayer	6	6
4	(Romania) S Cîrstea	4	3
5	(Ukraine) A Bondarenko	6	5	3
(Italy) F Schiavone	4	7	6
(Belarus) O Govortsova	6	6
(France) N Dechy	1	3

Quarterfinals
(Germany) K Barrois	1	1
WC	(Belgium) Y Wickmayer	6	6
(Italy) F Schiavone	6	6
(Belarus) O Govortsova	1	3

Semifinals
WC	(Belgium) Y Wickmayer	7	2	6
(Italy) F Schiavone	6^{3}	6	3
