= 2007 Ordina Open – Women's doubles =

Women's doubles
- 2007 Ordina Open

Final
- Champions: (Chinese Taipei) Chan Yung-Jan (Chinese Taipei) Chuang Chia-Jung
- Runners-up: (Spain) Anabel Medina Garrigues (Spain) Virginia Ruano Pascual
- Score: 7-5, 6-2

Events
Singles	men	women
Doubles	men	women
- Ordina Open

Chan Yung-jan and Chuang Chia-jung emerged the victors of the 2007 Ordina Open Women's Doubles Competition, defeating Anabel Medina Garrigues and Virginia Ruano Pascual in the final, 7–5, 6–2.

== Seeds ==
1. (Chinese Taipei) Chan Yung-Jan
  (Chinese Taipei) Chuang Chia-Jung (champions)
2. (United States) Meghann Shaughnessy
  (Slovakia) Janette Husárová (quarterfinals)
3. (Spain) Anabel Medina Garrigues
  (Spain) Virginia Ruano Pascual (final)
4. (Argentina) Gisela Dulko
  (United States) Meilen Tu (quarterfinals)

== Draw ==
Key

- Q = Qualifier
- WC = Wild card
- LL = Lucky loser
- Alt = Alternate
- ITF = ITF entry
- PR = Protected ranking
- SR = Special ranking
- SE = Special exempt
- JE = Junior exempt
- JR = Junior Accelerator Programme entrant
- CO = College Accelerator Programme entrant
- NG = Next Gen Accelerator Program entrant
- w/o = Walkover
- r = Retired
- d = Defaulted

First round
(Greece) E Daniilidou (Germany) J Wöhr	3	6	6^{3}
(France) S Brémond (Netherlands) M Krajicek	6	1	7^{7}
4	(Argentina) G Dulko (United States) M Tu	6	7^{7}
(Russia) K Lykina (Estonia) K Kanepi	3	6^{3}
(France) S Lefèvre (France) A Védy	6	6
(Switzerland) T Bacsinszky (Italy) K Knapp	3	1
(Ukraine) A Bondarenko (Ukraine) K Bondarenko	6	6
(Belarus) V Azarenka (Russia) A Chakvetadze	3	2
(Germany) G Arn (Germany) A Kerber	5	6	2
3	(Spain) A Medina Garrigues (Spain) V Ruano Pascual	7	3	6
(Germany) AP Schaefer (Germany) J Tiszolczy	0	0
(Belgium) D Feys (Netherlands) P Wong	6	6
(Romania) A Ehritt-Vanc (France) C Pin	1	4
2	(United States) M Shaughnessy (Slovakia) J Husárová	6	6

Quarterfinals
1	(Chinese Taipei) Chan YJ (Chinese Taipei) Chuang CJ	7	6
(France) S Brémond (Netherlands) M Krajicek	5	4
4	(Argentina) G Dulko (United States) M Tu	w	/	o
(France) S Lefèvre (France) A Védy	w	/	o
(Ukraine) A Bondarenko (Ukraine) K Bondarenko	3	6^{1}
3	(Spain) A Medina Garrigues (Spain) V Ruano Pascual	6	7^{7}
(Belgium) D Feys (Netherlands) P Wong	w	/	o
2	(United States) M Shaughnessy (Slovakia) J Husárová	w	/	o

Semifinals
1	(Chinese Taipei) Chan YJ (Chinese Taipei) Chuang CJ	6	6
(France) S Lefèvre (France) A Védy	2	1
3	(Spain) A Medina Garrigues (Spain) V Ruano Pascual	6	6
(Belgium) D Feys (Netherlands) P Wong	2	2

Finals
1	(Chinese Taipei) Chan YJ (Chinese Taipei) Chuang CJ	7	6
3	(Spain) A Medina Garrigues (Spain) V Ruano Pascual	5	2
