= 2009 Ordina Open – Women's doubles =

Women's doubles
- 2009 Ordina Open

Final
- Champions: (Italy) Sara Errani (Italy) Flavia Pennetta
- Runners-up: (Netherlands) Michaëlla Krajicek (Belgium) Yanina Wickmayer
- Score: 6–4, 5–7, [13–11]

Details
- Draw: 16
- Seeds: 4

Events
Singles	men	women
Doubles	men	women
- Ordina Open

The 2009 Ordina Open – Women's doubles was one of the events of the 2009 Ordina Open tennis tournament, played on outdoor grass courts in Rosmalen, 's-Hertogenbosch in the Netherlands, from 14 June until 20 June 2009. The draw consisted of 16 teams of which four were seeded. Marina Erakovic and Michaëlla Krajicek were the defending doubles champions, but Erakovic chose not to participate that year. Krajicek partnered with Yanina Wickmayer but they lost in the final to the unseeded team of Sara Errani end Flavia Pennetta.

== Seeds ==
1. (Germany) Anna-Lena Grönefeld / (Romania) Monica Niculescu (first round)
2. (Czech Republic) Iveta Benešová / (Czech Republic) Barbora Záhlavová-Strýcová (withdrew)
3. (Latvia) Līga Dekmeijere / (United States) Raquel Kops-Jones (semifinals)
4. (France) Nathalie Dechy / (Canada) Marie-Ève Pelletier (semifinals)

== Draw ==
Key

- Q = Qualifier
- WC = Wild card
- LL = Lucky loser
- Alt = Alternate
- ITF = ITF entry
- PR = Protected ranking
- SR = Special ranking
- SE = Special exempt
- JE = Junior exempt
- JR = Junior Accelerator Programme entrant
- CO = College Accelerator Programme entrant
- NG = Next Gen Accelerator Program entrant
- w/o = Walkover
- r = Retired
- d = Defaulted

=== Draw ===
First round
1	(Germany) A-L Grönefeld (Romania) M Niculescu	2	2
(Romania) S Cîrstea (Russia) D Safina	6	6
(Hungary) M Czink (South Africa) N Grandin	4	2
(Italy) S Errani (Italy) F Pennetta	6	6
4	(France) N Dechy (Canada) M-È Pelletier	6	6
(Austria) P Mayr (Russia) M Melnikova	2	0
WC	(Belgium) K Flipkens (Netherlands) L Kerkhove	2	4
(France) S Lefèvre (France) A Védy	6	6
(Chinese Taipei) Y-j Chan (Belarus) O Govortsova	7	1	[7]
(Italy) ME Camerin (France) J Coin	6^{3}	6	[10]
(France) S Brémond (France) S Foretz
3	(Latvia) L Dekmeijere (United States) R Kops-Jones	w/o
(Greece) E Daniilidou (Germany) J Wöhr	4	3
(Netherlands) M Krajicek (Belgium) Y Wickmayer	6	6
(Czech Republic) P Cetkovská (Czech Republic) V Uhlířová	w/o
2	(Czech Republic) I Benešová (Czech Republic) B Záhlavová-Strýcová

Quarterfinals
(Romania) S Cîrstea (Russia) D Safina	6^{4}	1
(Italy) S Errani (Italy) F Pennetta	7	6
4	(France) N Dechy (Canada) M-È Pelletier	6	6
(France) S Lefèvre (France) A Védy	2	3
(Italy) ME Camerin (France) J Coin	4	6^{5}
3	(Latvia) L Dekmeijere (United States) R Kops-Jones	6	7
(Netherlands) M Krajicek (Belgium) Y Wickmayer	6	7
(Czech Republic) P Cetkovská (Czech Republic) V Uhlířová	1	6^{1}

Semifinals
(Italy) S Errani (Italy) F Pennetta	6	6
4	(France) N Dechy (Canada) M-È Pelletier	2	4
3	(Latvia) L Dekmeijere (United States) R Kops-Jones	4	4
(Netherlands) M Krajicek (Belgium) Y Wickmayer	6	6

Final
(Italy) S Errani (Italy) F Pennetta	6	5	[13]
(Netherlands) M Krajicek (Belgium) Y Wickmayer	4	7	[11]
