= 2008 Ordina Open =

- Date: 15–21 June
- Edition: 19th
- Surface: Grass / outdoor
- Location: Rosmalen, 's-Hertogenbosch, Netherlands

Champions

Men's singles
- (Spain) David Ferrer

Women's singles
- (Thailand) Tamarine Tanasugarn

Men's doubles
- (Croatia) Mario Ančić / (Austria) Jürgen Melzer

Women's doubles
- (New Zealand) Marina Erakovic / (Netherlands) Michaëlla Krajicek
- Ordina Open

The 2008 Ordina Open was a tennis tournament played on outdoor grass courts. It was the 19th edition of the Ordina Open, and was part of the International Series of the 2008 ATP Tour, and of the Tier III Series of the 2008 WTA Tour. Both the men's and the women's events took place at the Autotron park in Rosmalen, 's-Hertogenbosch, Netherlands, from June 15 through June 21, 2008.

The men singles featured ATP No. 5, Valencia titlist and French Open quarterfinalist David Ferrer, Queen's Club quarterfinalist Richard Gasquet, and Australian Open quarterfinalist and Adelaide runner-up Jarkko Nieminen. Also competing were defending champion Ivan Ljubičić, Miami and Monte-Carlo Masters quarterfinalist Igor Andreev, Mario Ančić, Guillermo Cañas and Fabrice Santoro.

The women's draw was led by WTA No. 5, Dubai winner and French Open quarterfinalist Elena Dementieva, defending champion and Paris titlist Anna Chakvetadze, and Berlin Tier I champion and Roland-Garros runner-up Dinara Safina. Other top seeds were Dubai semifinalist Francesca Schiavone, Viña del Mar and Acapulco winner Flavia Pennetta, Maria Kirilenko, Katarina Srebotnik and Alona Bondarenko.

== Finals ==
=== Men's singles ===
(Spain) David Ferrer defeated (France) Marc Gicquel, 6–4, 6–2

- It was Ferrer's 2nd title of the year, and his 7th overall.

=== Women's singles ===
(Thailand) Tamarine Tanasugarn defeated (Russia) Dinara Safina, 7–5, 6–3

- It was Tanasugarn's 1st title of the year, and her 2nd overall.

=== Men's doubles ===
(Croatia) Mario Ančić / (Austria) Jürgen Melzer defeated (India) Mahesh Bhupathi / (India) Leander Paes, 7–6^{(7–5)}, 6–3

=== Women's doubles ===
(New Zealand) Marina Erakovic / (Netherlands) Michaëlla Krajicek defeated (Latvia) Līga Dekmeijere / (Germany) Angelique Kerber, 6–3, 6–2
