= 2008 International Women's Open =

- Date: 16–21 June
- Edition: 34th
- Category: Tier II Series
- Surface: Grass / outdoor
- Location: Eastbourne, United Kingdom

Champions

Singles
- (Poland) Agnieszka Radwańska

Doubles
- (Zimbabwe) Cara Black / (United States) Liezel Huber
- Eastbourne International

The 2008 International Women's Open was a tennis tournament played on outdoor grass courts. It was the 34th edition of the International Women's Open, and was part of the Tier II Series of the 2008 WTA Tour. It took place in Eastbourne, United Kingdom, from 16 June through 21 June 2008.

== History ==
The singles draw featured WTA No. 4 and French Open semifinalist Svetlana Kuznetsova, Paris semifinalist Marion Bartoli, and Prague titlist Vera Zvonareva. Also competing were Pattaya and Istanbul winner Agnieszka Radwańska, French Open mixed doubles champion Victoria Azarenka, Alizé Cornet, Nicole Vaidišová and Nadia Petrova. Recently crowned World No. 1 and 2008 French Open champion Ana Ivanovic was due to take part, but she withdrew due to a muscle strain.

== Finals ==
=== Singles ===
(Poland) Agnieszka Radwańska defeated (Russia) Nadia Petrova, 6–4, 6–7^{(11–13)}, 6–4

- It was Agnieszka Radwańska's 3rd title of the year, and her 4th overall.

=== Doubles ===
(Zimbabwe) Cara Black / (United States) Liezel Huber defeated (Czech Republic) Květa Peschke / (Australia) Rennae Stubbs, 2–6, 6–0, 10–8
