= 2006 Ordina Open =

- Date: 18–24 June
- Edition: 17th
- Surface: Grass / outdoor
- Location: Rosmalen, municipality of 's-Hertogenbosch, Netherlands

Champions

Men's singles
- (Croatia) Mario Ančić (vs Jan Hernych: 6–0, 5–7, 7–5)

Women's singles
- (Netherlands) Michaëlla Krajicek (vs Dinara Safina: 6–3, 6–4)

Men's doubles
- (Czech Republic) Martin Damm / (India) Leander Paes (vs Clément/Haggard: 6–1, 7–6^{(7–3)})

Women's doubles
- (China) Yan Zi / (China) Zheng Jie (vs Ivanovic/Kirilenko: 3–6, 6–2, 6–2)
- Ordina Open

The 2006 Ordina Open was the 2006 edition of the Ordina Open tennis tournament. It was the 17th edition of the tournament and was played on outdoor grass courts in Rosmalen, municipality of 's-Hertogenbosch, Netherlands. The men's and women's tournament was held from 18 June until 24 June 2006. Mario Ančić and Michaëlla Krajicek won the singles titles. Martin Damm & Leander Paes and Yan Zi & Zheng Jie won the doubles.

== Competitors, sets, and matches ==
Key

- Q = Qualifier
- WC = Wild card
- LL = Lucky loser
- Alt = Alternate
- ITF = ITF entry
- PR = Protected ranking
- SR = Special ranking
- SE = Special exempt
- JE = Junior exempt
- JR = Junior Accelerator Programme entrant
- CO = College Accelerator Programme entrant
- NG = Next Gen Accelerator Program entrant
- w/o = Walkover
- r = Retired
- d = Defaulted

=== Men's singles ===
(Croatia) Mario Ančić, defending champion, defeated (Czech Republic) Jan Hernych 6–0, 5–7, 7–5.

Seeds:

1. (Russia) Nikolay Davydenko (first round)
2. (Spain) Tommy Robredo (second round)
3. (Croatia) Mario Ančić (champion)
4. (Czech Republic) Tomáš Berdych (withdrew due to left leg injury)
5. (United States) Robby Ginepri (first round)
6. (Cyprus) Marcos Baghdatis (semifinals)
7. (Spain) Juan Carlos Ferrero (quarterfinals)
8. (Serbia) Novak Djokovic (second round)

Draw: 32 (4Q / 3WC)

Finals:

Semifinals
6	(Cyprus) Marcos Baghdatis	6^{4}	3
3	(Croatia) Mario Ančić	7	6
(Czech Republic) Jan Hernych	6	7
(France) Florent Serra	2	6^{3}

Finals
3	(Croatia) Mario Ančić	6	5	7
(Czech Republic) Jan Hernych	0	7	5

Section 1:

First round
1	(Russia) N Davydenko	2	4
(Germany) P Kohlschreiber	6	6
(France) J Benneteau	6	6
Q	(Australia) J Sirianni	4	4
(United States) V Spadea	4	6	6
(Germany) B Phau	6	1	4
(Czech Republic) I Minář	6	3	5
6	(Cyprus) M Baghdatis	3	6	7
3	(Croatia) M Ančić	7	6^{0}	7
Q	(Pakistan) A-U-H Qureshi	6^{3}	7	5
WC	(Netherlands) R Sluiter	1	6	6
(Czech Republic) R Vik	6	3	2
(Czech Republic) L Dlouhý	5	4
(Belgium) K Vliegen	7	6
(France) F Santoro	6	3
5/WC	(United States) R Ginepri	1	2	r

Second round
(Germany) P Kohlschreiber	7	7
(France) J Benneteau	6^{2}	5
(United States) V Spadea	2	6^{5}
6	(Cyprus) M Baghdatis	6	6
3	(Croatia) M Ančić	6^{7}	7	6
WC	(Netherlands) R Sluiter	7	5	2
(Belgium) K Vliegen	6	1	4
(France) F Santoro	2	6	6

Quarterfinals
(Germany) P Kohlschreiber	2	0
6	(Cyprus) M Baghdatis	6	3	r
3	(Croatia) M Ančić	6	6
(France) F Santoro	4	0

Semifinals
6	(Cyprus) M Baghdatis	6^{4}	3
3	(Croatia) M Ančić	7	6

Section 2:

First round
8	(Serbia) N Djokovic	6^{9}	7	7
(Germany) A Waske	7	6^{4}	6^{4}
(Czech Republic) J Hernych	6	6
Q	(Russia) M Ledovskikh	0	2
(France) A Clément	4	4
(South Korea) H-T Lee	6	6
(Italy) D Sanguinetti	6^{4}	6^{5}
LL	(Germany) M Zverev	7	7
7	(Spain) JC Ferrero	6	3	6
WC	(Netherlands) R Haase	4	6	2
(Austria) J Melzer	6	6
(Luxembourg) G Müller	2	2
(Germany) R Schüttler	4	4
(France) F Serra	6	6
Q	(Croatia) M Čilić	4	4
2	(Spain) T Robredo	6	6

Second round
8	(Serbia) N Djokovic	2	4
(Czech Republic) J Hernych	6	6
(South Korea) H-T Lee	6	6
LL	(Germany) M Zverev	1	3
7	(Spain) JC Ferrero	4	6	6
(Austria) J Melzer	6	3	4
(France) F Serra	6	3	6
2	(Spain) T Robredo	1	6	4

Quarterfinals
(Czech Republic) J Hernych	6	6
(South Korea) H-T Lee	4	4
7	(Spain) JC Ferrero	3	7	3
(France) F Serra	6	6^{4}	6

Semifinals
(Czech Republic) J Hernych	6	7
(France) F Serra	2	6^{3}

=== Women's singles ===
Defending champion (Czech Republic) Klára Koukalová lost in second round to unseeded (Netherlands) Michaëlla Krajicek, who went on to win the title by defeating (Russia) Dinara Safina 6–3, 6–4 in the final.

Seeds: (The first two seeds received a bye into the second round.)

1. (Russia) Elena Dementieva (semifinals)
2. (Russia) Dinara Safina (final)
3. (Italy) Flavia Pennetta (first round)
4. (Russia) Maria Kirilenko (first round)
5. (Serbia and Montenegro) Ana Ivanovic (quarterfinals)
6. (Spain) Anabel Medina Garrigues (first round)
7. (Argentina) Gisela Dulko (second round)
8. (Serbia and Montenegro) Jelena Janković (quarterfinals, retired due to a left abductor strain)

Draw: 30 (4Q / 2WC)

Finals:

Semifinals
1	(Russia) Elena Dementieva	6	6^{5}	4
(Netherlands) Michaëlla Krajicek	1	7^{7}	6
(Greece) Eleni Daniilidou	3	6	4
2	(Russia) Dinara Safina	6	3	6

Final
(Netherlands) Michaëlla Krajicek	6	6
2	(Russia) Dinara Safina	3	4

Top half:

First round
(Germany) J Schruff	2	3
(Russia) E Vesnina	6	6
(India) S Mirza	6^{7}	6	4
(Czech Republic) I Benešová	7^{9}	2	6
WC	(Australia) A Molik	1	6	2
5	(Serbia and Montenegro) A Ivanovic	6	3	6
3	(Italy) F Pennetta	5	3
(Netherlands) M Krajicek	7	6
(Czech Republic) K Koukalová	6	6
Q	(Spain) V Ruano Pascual	4	3
Q	(Ukraine) A Bondarenko	1
(China) N Li	1^{r}
WC	(Netherlands) M Boonstra	3	0
8	(Serbia and Montenegro) J Janković	6	6

Second round
1	(Russia) E Dementieva	6	4	6
(Russia) E Vesnina	1	6	4
(Czech Republic) I Benešová	3	5
5	(Serbia and Montenegro) A Ivanovic	6	7
(Netherlands) M Krajicek	6^{3}	6	6
(Czech Republic) K Koukalová	7^{7}	4	3
Q	(Ukraine) A Bondarenko	4	6	6^{5}
8	(Serbia and Montenegro) J Janković	6	1	7^{7}

Quarterfinals
1	(Russia) E Dementieva	7^{8}	6
5	(Serbia and Montenegro) A Ivanovic	6^{6}	4
(Netherlands) M Krajicek	6
8	(Serbia and Montenegro) J Janković	6^{r}

Semifinals
1	(Russia) E Dementieva	6	6^{5}	4
(Netherlands) M Krajicek	1	7^{7}	6

Bottom half:

First round
7	(Argentina) G Dulko	6	7^{7}
Q	(Argentina) M Díaz Oliva	1	6^{3}
(China) J Zheng	4	1
(Greece) E Daniilidou	6	6
(Japan) E Takao	3	3
(Croatia) J Kostanić	6	6
Q	(Argentina) P Suárez	6	6
4	(Russia) M Kirilenko	4	3
6	(Spain) A Medina Garrigues	6	3	1
(Poland) M Domachowska	3	6	6
(United States) L Granville	5	3
WC	(Netherlands) B Schultz-McCarthy	7	6
LL	(Estonia) M Ani	5	6	0
(Italy) ME Camerin	7	0	6

Second round
7	(Argentina) G Dulko	3	3
(Greece) E Daniilidou	6	6
(Croatia) J Kostanić	2	0
Q	(Argentina) P Suárez	6	6
(Poland) M Domachowska	6^{4}	7^{7}	3
WC	(Netherlands) B Schultz-McCarthy	7^{7}	6^{3}	6
(Italy) ME Camerin	6	2	1
2	(Russia) D Safina	4	6	6

Quarterfinals
(Greece) E Daniilidou	6	0
Q	(Argentina) P Suárez	2	0^{r}
WC	(Netherlands) B Schultz-McCarthy	3	4
2	(Russia) D Safina	6	6

Semifinals
(Greece) E Daniilidou	3	6	4
2	(Russia) D Safina	6	3	6

=== Men's doubles ===
(Czech Republic) Martin Damm / (India) Leander Paes defeated (France) Arnaud Clément / (South Africa) Chris Haggard 6–1, 7–6^{(7–3)} in the final.

Cyril Suk and Pavel Vízner were the defending champions, but did not play together this year. Suk partnered Robin Vik, losing in the first round. Vízner partnered Lukáš Dlouhý, losing in the semifinals.

Seeds:

1. (Czech Republic) Martin Damm / (India) Leander Paes (champions)
2. (Poland) Mariusz Fyrstenberg / (Poland) Marcin Matkowski (quarterfinals)
3. (Czech Republic) Lukáš Dlouhý / (Czech Republic) Pavel Vízner (semifinals)
4. (Czech Republic) František Čermák / (Czech Republic) Leoš Friedl (first round)

Draw:

First round
1	(Czech Republic) M Damm (India) L Paes	6	6
(Czech Republic) C Suk (Czech Republic) R Vik	4	4
(France) J Benneteau (France) F Serra	6	7^{9}
(Netherlands) Bart Beks (Netherlands) M van Haasteren	2	6^{7}
3	(Czech Republic) L Dlouhý (Czech Republic) P Vízner	6	6
(Czech Republic) P Pála (Czech Republic) D Škoch	3	3
(Luxembourg) G Müller (Germany) P Petzschner	7	6
(Spain) T Robredo (Italy) D Sanguinetti	5	3
WC	(Netherlands) R Haase (Netherlands) R Sluiter	6^{2}	4
(France) A Clément (South Africa) C Haggard	7^{7}	6
(United States) T Phillips (Netherlands) R Wassen	6	7^{7}
4	(Czech Republic) F Čermák (Czech Republic) L Friedl	2	6^{5}
(Switzerland) Y Allegro (Belgium) K Vliegen	6	7^{7}
(Germany) M Kohlmann (Germany) R Schüttler	2	6^{5}
WC	(Croatia) M Čilić (Netherlands) T de Bakker	3	3
2	(Poland) M Fyrstenberg (Poland) M Matkowski	6	6

Quarterfinals
1	(Czech Republic) M Damm (India) L Paes	6	6
(France) J Benneteau (France) F Serra	4	2
3	(Czech Republic) L Dlouhý (Czech Republic) P Vízner	7	4	[10]
(Luxembourg) G Müller (Germany) P Petzschner	5	6	[6]
(France) A Clément (South Africa) C Haggard	6	6
(United States) T Phillips (Netherlands) R Wassen	3	4
(Switzerland) Y Allegro (Belgium) K Vliegen	6^{3}	6	[10]
2	(Poland) M Fyrstenberg (Poland) M Matkowski	7^{7}	3	[5]

Semifinals
1	(Czech Republic) M Damm (India) L Paes	6^{7}	6	[10]
3	(Czech Republic) L Dlouhý (Czech Republic) P Vízner	7^{9}	3	[8]
(France) A Clément (South Africa) C Haggard	7	7
(Switzerland) Y Allegro (Belgium) K Vliegen	5	5

Final
1	(Czech Republic) M Damm (India) L Paes	6	7^{7}
(France) A Clément (South Africa) C Haggard	1	6^{3}

=== Women's doubles ===
(China) Yan Zi / (China) Zheng Jie defeated (Serbia) Ana Ivanovic / (Russia) Maria Kirilenko 3–6, 6–2, 6–2.

Seeds:

1. (China) Yan Zi
  (China) Zheng Jie (champions)
2. (Russia) Elena Dementieva
  (Italy) Flavia Pennetta (semifinals)
3. (Greece) Eleni Daniilidou
  (Spain) Anabel Medina Garrigues (first round)
4. (Italy) Maria Elena Camerin
  (Argentina) Gisela Dulko (semifinals)

Draw:

First round
1	(China) Z Yan (China) J Zheng	7^{7}	6
(Germany) M Müller (United States) A Spears	6^{2}	1
WC	(Australia) A Molik (Australia) B Stewart	3	3
(Spain) V Ruano Pascual (Argentina) P Suárez	6	6
4	(Italy) ME Camerin (Argentina) G Dulko	6	6
(Croatia) J Kostanić (Germany) J Wöhr	4	4
(Netherlands) M Krajicek (Russia) D Safina	7	6
(Ukraine) A Bondarenko (Belarus) A Yakimova	5	1
(Czech Republic) G Navrátilová (Czech Republic) V Uhlířová	6	6
Q	(Poland) K Jans (Poland) A Rosolska	3	3
(Serbia) A Ivanovic (Russia) M Kirilenko	7	6
3	(Greece) E Daniilidou (Spain) A Medina Garrigues	5	4
(Estonia) M Ani (Czech Republic) I Benešová	4	3
WC	(Russia) J Janković (Slovenia) T Križan	6	6
LL	(Netherlands) M Boonstra (Germany) C Schneider	3	4
2	(Russia) E Dementieva (Italy) F Pennetta	6	6

Quarterfinals
1	(China) Z Yan (China) J Zheng	6	6
(Spain) V Ruano Pascual (Argentina) P Suárez	3	2
4	(Italy) ME Camerin (Argentina) G Dulko	1	6	6
(Netherlands) M Krajicek (Russia) D Safina	6	4	3
(Czech Republic) G Navrátilová (Czech Republic) V Uhlířová	1	3
3	(Serbia) A Ivanovic (Russia) M Kirilenko	6	6
WC	(Russia) J Janković (Slovenia) T Križan	1	6	1
2	(Russia) E Dementieva (Italy) F Pennetta	6	4	6

Semifinals
1	(China) Z Yan (China) J Zheng	4	6	6
4	(Italy) ME Camerin (Argentina) G Dulko	6	3	1
(Serbia) A Ivanovic (Russia) M Kirilenko	6	2	6
2	(Russia) E Dementieva (Italy) F Pennetta	3	6	2

Final
1	(China) Z Yan (China) J Zheng	3	6	6
(Serbia) A Ivanovic (Russia) M Kirilenko	6	2	2
