= 2022 Eastbourne International – Men's doubles =

Men's doubles
- 2022 Eastbourne International

Final
- Champions: (Croatia) Nikola Mektić (Croatia) Mate Pavić
- Runners-up: (Netherlands) Matwé Middelkoop (Australia) Luke Saville
- Score: 6–4, 6–2

Details
- Draw: 16
- Seeds: 4

Events
Singles	men	women
Doubles	men	women
← 2021 ·	Eastbourne International	· 2023 →

Defending champions Nikola Mektić and Mate Pavić defeated Matwé Middelkoop and Luke Saville in the final, 6–4, 6–2, to win the men's doubles tennis title at the 2022 Eastbourne International. Without dropping a set en route to their successful title defense, the pair also earned their fourth ATP Tour doubles title of the season.

== Seeds ==
1. (Croatia) Nikola Mektić / (Croatia) Mate Pavić (champions)
2. (Colombia) Juan Sebastián Cabal / (Colombia) Robert Farah (first round)
3. (Australia) John Peers / (Slovakia) Filip Polášek (first round)
4. (Croatia) Ivan Dodig / (United States) Austin Krajicek (semifinals)

== Draw ==
=== Key ===
- Q = Qualifier
- WC = Wild card
- LL = Lucky loser
- Alt = Alternate
- SE = Special exempt
- PR = Protected ranking
- ITF = ITF entry
- JE = Junior exempt
- w/o = Walkover
- r = Retired
- d = Defaulted
- SR = Special ranking

=== Draw ===
First round
1	(Croatia) N Mektić (Croatia) M Pavić	6	6
WC	(United Kingdom) J O'Mara (United Kingdom) K Skupski	4	4
(Argentina) F Cerúndolo (Argentina) TM Etcheverry	3	6	[8]
(United States) M Cressy (France) U Humbert	6	4	[10]
3	(Australia) J Peers (Slovakia) F Polášek	4	7^{7}	[7]
(United Kingdom) J Murray (Brazil) B Soares	6	6^{5}	[10]
(Sweden) A Göransson (Japan) B McLachlan	6^{3}	7^{11}	[4]
(United Kingdom) L Glasspool (Finland) H Heliövaara	7^{7}	6^{9}	[10]
(Spain) A Davidovich Fokina (Spain) P Martínez	4	6^{8}
(France) N Mahut (France) É Roger-Vasselin	6	7^{10}
PR	(Chile) C Garín (Chile) J Peralta	4	4
4	(Croatia) I Dodig (United States) A Krajicek	6	6
WC	(United Kingdom) J Cash (United Kingdom) H Patten	4	6^{4}
(Kazakhstan) A Nedovyesov (Pakistan) A-u-H Qureshi	6	7^{7}
(Netherlands) M Middelkoop (Australia) L Saville	6	6
2	(Colombia) JS Cabal (Colombia) R Farah	3	4

Quarterfinals
1	(Croatia) N Mektić (Croatia) M Pavić	7^{11}	6
(United States) M Cressy (France) U Humbert	6^{9}	1
(United Kingdom) J Murray (Brazil) B Soares	6	7
(United Kingdom) L Glasspool (Finland) H Heliövaara	4	5
(France) N Mahut (France) É Roger-Vasselin	5	2
4	(Croatia) I Dodig (United States) A Krajicek	7	6
(Kazakhstan) A Nedovyesov (Pakistan) A-u-H Qureshi	6	4	[3]
(Netherlands) M Middelkoop (Australia) L Saville	4	6	[10]

Semifinals
1	(Croatia) N Mektić (Croatia) M Pavić	6	6
(United Kingdom) J Murray (Brazil) B Soares	4	4
4	(Croatia) I Dodig (United States) A Krajicek	7^{7}	4	[8]
(Netherlands) M Middelkoop (Australia) L Saville	6^{3}	6	[10]

Final
1	(Croatia) N Mektić (Croatia) M Pavić	6	6
(Netherlands) M Middelkoop (Australia) L Saville	4	2
