= 2022 Eastbourne International – Men's singles =

Men's singles
- 2022 Eastbourne International

Final
- Champion: (United States) Taylor Fritz
- Runner-up: (United States) Maxime Cressy
- Score: 6–2, 6–7^{(4–7)}, 7–6^{(7–4)}

Details
- Draw: 28
- Seeds: 8

Events
Singles	men	women
Doubles	men	women
← 2021 ·	Eastbourne International	· 2023 →

Taylor Fritz defeated Maxime Cressy in the final, 6–2, 6–7^{(4–7)}, 7–6^{(7–4)} to win the men's singles tennis title at the 2022 Eastbourne International.

Alex de Minaur was the defending champion, but lost in the semifinals to Fritz.

== Seeds ==
The top four seeds receive a bye into the second round.

1. (United Kingdom) Cameron Norrie (quarterfinals)
2. (Italy) Jannik Sinner (second round)
3. (United States) Taylor Fritz (champion)
4. (Argentina) Diego Schwartzman (second round)
5. (United States) Reilly Opelka (first round)
6. (Australia) Alex de Minaur (semifinals)
7. (United States) Frances Tiafoe (first round)
8. (Denmark) Holger Rune (first round)

== Draw ==
=== Key ===
- Q = Qualifier
- WC = Wild card
- LL = Lucky loser
- Alt = Alternate
- SE = Special exempt
- PR = Protected ranking
- ITF = ITF entry
- JE = Junior exempt
- w/o = Walkover
- r = Retired
- d = Defaulted
- SR = Special ranking

=== Finals ===
Semifinals
(United States) Maxime Cressy	7^{7}	6^{2}	6
WC	(United Kingdom) Jack Draper	6^{5}	7^{7}	3
3	(United States) Taylor Fritz	6	6^{5}	6
6	(Australia) Alex de Minaur	1	7^{7}	3

Final
(United States) Maxime Cressy	2	7^{7}	6^{4}
3	(United States) Taylor Fritz	6	6^{4}	7^{7}

=== Top half ===
First round
WC	(United Kingdom) J Clarke	1	3
Q	(United States) B Nakashima	6	6
(United Kingdom) D Evans	6	6
(France) A Mannarino	4	3
(United States) M Cressy	6	6
5	(United States) R Opelka	3	1
(United States) J Brooksby	2	2
WC	(United Kingdom) J Draper	6	6
(Spain) A Davidovich Fokina	6	6^{6}	0^{r}
(Spain) P Martínez	1	7^{8}	0
WC	(United Kingdom) R Peniston	4	7^{7}	6
8	(Denmark) H Rune	6	6^{5}	1

Second round
1	(United Kingdom) C Norrie	6	6
Q	(United States) B Nakashima	4	2
(United Kingdom) D Evans	6^{2}	4
(United States) M Cressy	7^{7}	6
4	(Argentina) D Schwartzman	5	6^{3}
WC	(United Kingdom) J Draper	7	7^{7}
(Spain) P Martínez	6^{8}	6	3
WC	(United Kingdom) R Peniston	7^{10}	3	6

Quarterfinals
1	(United Kingdom) C Norrie	5	5
(United States) M Cressy	7	7
WC	(United Kingdom) J Draper	6	6
WC	(United Kingdom) R Peniston	3	3

Semifinals
(United States) M Cressy	7^{7}	6^{2}	6
WC	(United Kingdom) J Draper	6^{5}	7^{7}	3

=== Bottom half ===
First round
7	(United States) F Tiafoe	7	6^{4}	0
(Kazakhstan) A Bublik	5	7^{7}	6
(United States) S Korda	3	6^{5}
Q	(Australia) J Millman	6	7^{7}
(France) U Humbert	7^{7}	3	4
Q	(Brazil) T Monteiro	6^{2}	6	6
6	(Australia) A de Minaur	6	6
(Chile) C Garín	3	3
(Italy) L Sonego	4	7^{7}	7^{7}
Q	(Australia) J Duckworth	6	6^{5}	6^{1}
(Argentina) F Cerúndolo	6	6^{2}	4
(United States) T Paul	4	7^{7}	6

Second round
(Kazakhstan) A Bublik	6	6
Q	(Australia) J Millman	4	2
Q	(Brazil) T Monteiro	5	3
3	(United States) T Fritz	7	6
6	(Australia) A de Minaur	7^{7}	6
(Italy) L Sonego	6^{3}	2
(United States) T Paul	6	3	6
2	(Italy) J Sinner	3	6	3

Quarterfinals
(Kazakhstan) A Bublik	3	2
3	(United States) T Fritz	6	6
6	(Australia) A de Minaur	6	4	6
(United States) T Paul	2	6	4

Semifinals
3	(United States) T Fritz	6	6^{5}	6
6	(Australia) A de Minaur	1	7^{7}	3

== Qualifying ==
=== Seeds ===
1. (United States) Brandon Nakashima (qualified)
2. (France) Hugo Gaston (first round)
3. (Australia) James Duckworth (qualified)
4. (Czech Republic) Jiří Lehečka (withdrew)
5. (Argentina) Tomás Martín Etcheverry (first round)
6. (Australia) John Millman (qualified)
7. (Sweden) Mikael Ymer (qualifying competition)
8. (United States) Steve Johnson (qualifying competition)
9. (Brazil) Thiago Monteiro (qualified)

=== Qualifiers ===
1. (United States) Brandon Nakashima
2. (Australia) John Millman
3. (Australia) James Duckworth
4. (Brazil) Thiago Monteiro

=== Draw ===
==== First qualifier ====
First round
1	(United States) Brandon Nakashima	4	6	6
(United States) Sam Querrey	6	3	1
Alt	(United Kingdom) Paul Jubb	6^{2}	6	3
8	(United States) Steve Johnson	7^{7}	1	6

Qualifying competition
1	(United States) Brandon Nakashima	6	6
8	(United States) Steve Johnson	4	4

==== Second qualifier ====
First round
2	(France) Hugo Gaston	0	2
WC	(United Kingdom) Liam Broady	6	6
(Switzerland) Henri Laaksonen	2	4
6	(Australia) John Millman	6	6

Qualifying competition
WC	(United Kingdom) Liam Broady	4	3
6	(Australia) John Millman	6	6

==== Third qualifier ====
First round
3	(Australia) James Duckworth	6	6
WC	(United Kingdom) Daniel Cox	3	1
Alt	(United Kingdom) Alastair Gray	7^{8}	5	6^{3}
7	(Sweden) Mikael Ymer	6^{6}	7	7^{7}

Qualifying competition
3	(Australia) James Duckworth	3	6	6
7	(Sweden) Mikael Ymer	6	2	4

==== Fourth qualifier ====
First round
9	(Brazil) Thiago Monteiro	7^{7}	6
Alt	(United Kingdom) Mark Whitehouse	6^{3}	3
Alt	(China) Shang Juncheng	7^{8}	2	6
5	(Argentina) Tomás Martín Etcheverry	6^{6}	6	2

Qualifying competition
9	(Brazil) Thiago Monteiro	6	6
Alt	(China) Shang Juncheng	4	2
