= 2018 Eastbourne International – Women's doubles =

Women's doubles
- 2018 Eastbourne International

Final
- Champions: (Canada) Gabriela Dabrowski (China) Xu Yifan
- Runners-up: (Romania) Irina-Camelia Begu (Romania) Mihaela Buzărnescu
- Score: 6–3, 7–5

Events
Singles	men	women
Doubles	men	women
← 2017 ·	Eastbourne International	· 2019 →

Latisha Chan and Martina Hingis were the defending champions, but Hingis retired from professional tennis at the end of 2017. Chan played alongside Peng Shuai, but they lost in the first round to Irina-Camelia Begu and Mihaela Buzărnescu.

Gabriela Dabrowski and Xu Yifan won the title, defeating Begu and Buzărnescu in the final, 6–3, 7–5.

== Seeds ==
1. (Czech Republic) Andrea Sestini Hlaváčková / (Czech Republic) Barbora Strýcová (first round)
2. (Slovenia) Andreja Klepač / (Spain) María José Martínez Sánchez (quarterfinals, retired)
3. (Chinese Taipei) Latisha Chan / (China) Peng Shuai (first round)
4. (Canada) Gabriela Dabrowski / (China) Xu Yifan (champions)

== Draw ==
=== Key ===
- Q = Qualifier
- WC = Wild card
- LL = Lucky loser
- Alt = Alternate
- SE = Special exempt
- PR = Protected ranking
- ITF = ITF entry
- JE = Junior exempt
- w/o = Walkover
- r = Retired
- d = Defaulted
- SR = Special ranking

=== Draw ===
First round
1	(Czech Republic) A Sestini Hlaváčková (Czech Republic) B Strýcová	2	6^{5}
(Belgium) E Mertens (Netherlands) D Schuurs	6	7^{7}
(Georgia (country)) O Kalashnikova (Japan) M Ninomiya	2	6^{5}
(Ukraine) N Kichenok (Russia) E Makarova	6	7^{7}
3	(Chinese Taipei) L Chan (China) S Peng	4	6	[7]
(Romania) I-C Begu (Romania) M Buzărnescu	6	3	[10]
(United States) V King (Slovenia) K Srebotnik	3	7^{7}	[10]
(United States) N Melichar (Czech Republic) K Peschke	6	6^{3}	[6]
(Hungary) T Babos (United Kingdom) J Konta	6	5	[10]
(Ukraine) L Kichenok (Russia) A Kudryavtseva	1	7	[6]
WC	(United Kingdom) H Dart (United Kingdom) K Dunne	6	1	[7]
4	(Canada) G Dabrowski (China) Y Xu	2	6	[10]
(Chinese Taipei) H-c Chan (China) Z Yang	3	7	[7]
(Chinese Taipei) S-w Hsieh (Belarus) A Sabalenka	6	5	[10]
(United States) R Atawo (Germany) A-L Grönefeld	6	5	[5]
2	(Slovenia) A Klepač (Spain) MJ Martínez Sánchez	3	7	[10]

Quarterfinals
(Belgium) E Mertens (Netherlands) D Schuurs	2	1^{r}
(Ukraine) N Kichenok (Russia) E Makarova	6	2
(Romania) I-C Begu (Romania) M Buzărnescu	6	6
(United States) V King (Slovenia) K Srebotnik	2	4
(Hungary) T Babos (United Kingdom) J Konta	4	4
4	(Canada) G Dabrowski (China) Y Xu	6	6
(Chinese Taipei) S-w Hsieh (Belarus) A Sabalenka	3
2	(Slovenia) A Klepač (Spain) MJ Martínez Sánchez	0^{r}

Semifinals
(Ukraine) N Kichenok (Russia) E Makarova	6	0	[6]
(Romania) I-C Begu (Romania) M Buzărnescu	4	6	[10]
4	(Canada) G Dabrowski (China) Y Xu	6^{4}	7	[13]
(Chinese Taipei) S-w Hsieh (Belarus) A Sabalenka	7^{7}	5	[11]

Final
(Romania) I-C Begu (Romania) M Buzărnescu	3	5
4	(Canada) G Dabrowski (China) Y Xu	6	7
