= 2022 Eastbourne International – Women's singles =

Women's singles
- 2022 Eastbourne International

Final
- Champion: (Czech Republic) Petra Kvitová
- Runner-up: (Latvia) Jeļena Ostapenko
- Score: 6–3, 6–2

Details
- Draw: 48
- Seeds: 16

Events
Singles	men	women
Doubles	men	women
← 2021 ·	Eastbourne International	· 2023 →

Petra Kvitová defeated the defending champion Jeļena Ostapenko in the final, 6–3, 6–2 to win the women's singles tennis title at the 2022 Eastbourne International. Ostapenko was aiming to be the first woman to defend the Eastbourne title since Justine Henin in 2007.

== Seeds ==
All seeds received a bye into the second round.

1. (Spain) Paula Badosa (second round)
2. (Tunisia) Ons Jabeur (withdrew)
3. (Greece) Maria Sakkari (second round)
4. (Czech Republic) Karolína Plíšková (second round)
5. (Spain) Garbiñe Muguruza (third round)
6. (United States) Coco Gauff (withdrew)
7. (Czech Republic) Barbora Krejčíková (second round)
8. (Latvia) Jeļena Ostapenko (final)
9. (Kazakhstan) Elena Rybakina (second round)
10. (Switzerland) Jil Teichmann (second round)
11. (United States) Madison Keys (third round, retired)
12. (Italy) Camila Giorgi (semifinals)
13. (Belgium) Elise Mertens (second round)
14. (Czech Republic) Petra Kvitová (champion)
15. (Brazil) Beatriz Haddad Maia (semifinals)
16. (Kazakhstan) Yulia Putintseva (third round)
17. (United States) Alison Riske (second round)

Click on the seed number of a player to go to their draw section.

== Draw ==
=== Key ===
- Q = Qualifier
- WC = Wild card
- LL = Lucky loser
- Alt = Alternate
- ITF = ITF entry
- PR = Protected ranking
- SR = Special ranking
- SE = Special exempt
- JE = Junior exempt
- JR = Junior Accelerator Programme entrant
- CO = College Accelerator Programme entrant
- NG = Next Gen Accelerator Program entrant
- w/o = Walkover
- r = Retired
- d = Defaulted

=== Finals ===
Quarterfinals
15	(Brazil) Beatriz Haddad Maia	w/o
Q	(Ukraine) Lesia Tsurenko
14	(Czech Republic) Petra Kvitová	6	6
WC	(United Kingdom) Harriet Dart	3	4
8	(Latvia) Jeļena Ostapenko	6	6
(Ukraine) Anhelina Kalinina	3	2
12	(Italy) Camila Giorgi	6	6
LL	(Bulgaria) Viktoriya Tomova	2	1

Semifinals
15	(Brazil) Beatriz Haddad Maia	6^{5}	4
14	(Czech Republic) Petra Kvitová	7^{7}	6
8	(Latvia) Jeļena Ostapenko	6	6
12	(Italy) Camila Giorgi	2	2

Final
14	(Czech Republic) Petra Kvitová	6	6
8	(Latvia) Jeļena Ostapenko	3	2

=== Top half ===
==== Section 1 ====
First round
(Croatia) P Martić	6	5	3
WC	(United Kingdom) J Burrage	3	7	6
(Estonia) K Kanepi	6^{4}	6	6
(Spain) N Párrizas Díaz	7^{7}	4	4
(Colombia) C Osorio	5	6^{2}
Q	(Ukraine) L Tsurenko	7	7^{7}
(Montenegro) D Kovinić	6^{1}	1
(Poland) M Linette	7^{7}	6

Second round
1	(Spain) P Badosa	4	3
WC	(United Kingdom) J Burrage	6	6
(Estonia) K Kanepi	4	6	3
15	(Brazil) B Haddad Maia	6	3	6
9	(Kazakhstan) E Rybakina	6	5	3
Q	(Ukraine) L Tsurenko	1	7	6
(Poland) M Linette	6^{3}	6	7^{7}
17	(United States) A Riske	7^{7}	3	6^{4}

Third round
WC	(United Kingdom) J Burrage	1	2
15	(Brazil) B Haddad Maia	6	6
Q	(Ukraine) L Tsurenko	7	3	7
(Poland) M Linette	5	6	5

Quarterfinals
15	(Brazil) B Haddad Maia	w/o
Q	(Ukraine) L Tsurenko

==== Section 2 ====
First round
WC	(United Kingdom) K Boulter	7	7^{7}
(Czech Republic) T Martincová	5	6^{5}
(Ukraine) D Yastremska	0	2
Q	(Croatia) D Vekić	6	6
(United States) M Brengle	6	1	4
WC	(United Kingdom) H Dart	3	6	6
(Switzerland) V Golubic	2	1
(Ukraine) M Kostyuk	6	6

Second round
4	(Czech Republic) Ka Plíšková	6	4	4
WC	(United Kingdom) K Boulter	1	6	6
Q	(Croatia) D Vekić	1	6^{1}
14	(Czech Republic) P Kvitová	6	7^{7}
10	(Switzerland) J Teichmann	6^{7}	6	3
WC	(United Kingdom) H Dart	7^{9}	4	6
(Ukraine) M Kostyuk	4	6	6
7	(Czech Republic) B Krejčíková	6	3	4

Third round
WC	(United Kingdom) K Boulter	7	0	5
14	(Czech Republic) P Kvitová	5	6	7
WC	(United Kingdom) H Dart	6	2	6
(Ukraine) M Kostyuk	4	6	4

Quarterfinals
14	(Czech Republic) P Kvitová	6	6
WC	(United Kingdom) H Dart	3	4

=== Bottom half ===
==== Section 3 ====
First round
Q	(Serbia) A Krunić	0	6	3
(Australia) A Tomljanović	6	4	6
(Romania) E-G Ruse	4	4
(United States) L Davis	6	6
(Spain) S Sorribes Tormo	6	6
(Hungary) P Udvardy	3	0
(Ukraine) A Kalinina	6	2
(Romania) S Cîrstea	0	1^{r}

Second round
8	(Latvia) J Ostapenko	6	6
(Australia) A Tomljanović	4	4
(United States) L Davis	4	3
11	(United States) M Keys	6	6
16	(Kazakhstan) Y Putintseva	7	6
(Spain) S Sorribes Tormo	5	1
(Ukraine) A Kalinina	3	7	6
3	(Greece) M Sakkari	6	5	4

Third round
8	(Latvia) J Ostapenko	6	0
11	(United States) M Keys	3	0^{r}
16	(Kazakhstan) Y Putintseva	3	6	3
(Ukraine) A Kalinina	6	2	6

Quarterfinals
8	(Latvia) J Ostapenko	6	6
(Ukraine) A Kalinina	3	2

==== Section 4 ====
First round
(China) Q Zheng	3	0
(Poland) M Fręch	6	6
LL	(United Kingdom) H Watson	6^{1}	4
LL	(Canada) R Marino	7^{7}	6
(Belgium) M Zanevska	2	3
Q	(Belgium) K Flipkens	6	6
(Czech Republic) M Bouzková	6	3	4
(United States) S Rogers	3	6	6

Second round
5	(Spain) G Muguruza	6	7^{9}
(Poland) M Fręch	1	6^{7}
LL	(Canada) R Marino	5	4
12	(Italy) C Giorgi	7	6
13	(Belgium) E Mertens	2	6	1
Q	(Belgium) K Flipkens	6	2	6
(United States) S Rogers	6	3	2
LL	(Bulgaria) V Tomova	4	6	6

Third round
5	(Spain) G Muguruza	5	3
12	(Italy) C Giorgi	7	6
Q	(Belgium) K Flipkens	6	3	4
LL	(Bulgaria) V Tomova	3	6	6

Quarterfinals
12	(Italy) C Giorgi	6	6
LL	(Bulgaria) V Tomova	2	1

== Qualifying ==
=== Seeds ===
1. (Croatia) Donna Vekić (qualified)
2. (China) Wang Xiyu (withdrew)
3. (United Kingdom) Heather Watson (qualifying competition, lucky loser)
4. (Serbia) Aleksandra Krunić (qualified)
5. (Australia) Daria Saville (first round)
6. (Canada) Rebecca Marino (qualifying competition, lucky loser)
7. (France) Kristina Mladenovic (first round)
8. (Ukraine) Lesia Tsurenko (qualified)

=== Qualifiers ===
1. (Croatia) Donna Vekić
2. (Belgium) Kirsten Flipkens
3. (Ukraine) Lesia Tsurenko
4. (Serbia) Aleksandra Krunić

=== Lucky losers ===
1. (Canada) Rebecca Marino
2. (United Kingdom) Heather Watson
3. (Bulgaria) Viktoriya Tomova

=== Qualifying draw ===
==== First qualifier ====
First round
1	(Croatia) Donna Vekić	6	6
WC	(United Kingdom) Alicia Dudeney	1	3
(United Kingdom) Yuriko Miyazaki	1	6	6
5/PR	(Australia) Daria Saville	6	1	4

Qualifying competition
1	(Croatia) Donna Vekić	6	4	6
(United Kingdom) Yuriko Miyazaki	2	6	3

==== Second qualifier ====
First round
Alt	(Kazakhstan) Anna Danilina	1	2
(Bulgaria) Viktoriya Tomova	6	6
PR	(Belgium) Kirsten Flipkens	6	6
7	(France) Kristina Mladenovic	4	4

Qualifying competition
(Bulgaria) Viktoriya Tomova	6	2	6^{4}
PR	(Belgium) Kirsten Flipkens	4	6	7^{7}

==== Third qualifier ====
First round
3	(United Kingdom) Heather Watson	4	6	6
(Poland) Urszula Radwańska	6	3	3
PR	(Australia) Kimberly Birrell	3	1
8	(Ukraine) Lesia Tsurenko	6	6

Qualifying competition
3	(United Kingdom) Heather Watson	2	6^{6}
8	(Ukraine) Lesia Tsurenko	6	7^{8}

==== Fourth qualifier ====
First round
4	(Serbia) Aleksandra Krunić	6	6
(United States) Caty McNally	2	3
WC	(United Kingdom) Freya Christie	1	4
6	(Canada) Rebecca Marino	6	6

Qualifying competition
4	(Serbia) Aleksandra Krunić	6	4	6
6	(Canada) Rebecca Marino	1	6	2
