= 2021 Eastbourne International =

- Date: 21–26 June
- Edition: 10th (men); 46th (women)
- Category: ATP 250 (men); WTA 500 (women)
- Draw: 28S / 16D (men); 56S / 16D (women)
- Prize money: €697,405 (men) $757,900 (women)
- Surface: Grass
- Location: Eastbourne, United Kingdom
- Venue: Devonshire Park LTC

Champions

Men's singles
- (Australia) Alex de Minaur

Women's singles
- (Latvia) Jeļena Ostapenko

Men's doubles
- (Croatia) Nikola Mektić / (Croatia) Mate Pavić

Women's doubles
- (Japan) Shuko Aoyama / (Japan) Ena Shibahara
- Eastbourne International

The 2021 Eastbourne International (also known as the Viking International Eastbourne for sponsorship reasons) was a combined men's and women's tennis tournament played on outdoor grass courts. It was the 46th edition of the event for the women and the 10th edition for the men. The tournament was classified as a WTA 500 tournament on the 2021 WTA Tour and as an ATP Tour 250 series on the 2021 ATP Tour. The tournament took place at the Devonshire Park Lawn Tennis Club in Eastbourne, United Kingdom between 21 and 26 June 2021.

== Champions ==
=== Men's singles ===
- (Australia) Alex de Minaur def. (Italy) Lorenzo Sonego, 4–6, 6–4, 7–6^{(7–5)}

=== Women's singles ===
- (Latvia) Jeļena Ostapenko def. (Estonia) Anett Kontaveit, 6–3, 6–3

=== Men's doubles ===
- (Croatia) Nikola Mektić / (Croatia) Mate Pavić def. (United States) Rajeev Ram / (United Kingdom) Joe Salisbury, 6–4, 6–3

=== Women's doubles ===
- (Japan) Shuko Aoyama / (Japan) Ena Shibahara def. (United States) Nicole Melichar / (Netherlands) Demi Schuurs, 6–1, 6–4

== Points and prize money ==
=== Point distribution ===
Event	W	F	SF	QF	Round of 16	Round of 32	Q	Q2	Q1
Singles	250	150	90	45	20	0	12	6	0
Doubles	250	150	90	45	0	—N/a	—N/a	—N/a	—N/a

=== Prize money ===
Event	W	F	SF	QF	Round of 16	Round of 32	Q2	Q1
Singles	€53,680	€38,485	€27,400	€18,265	€11,740	€7,065	€3,450	€1,795
Doubles*	€20,050	€14,350	€9,460	€6,145	€3,600	—N/a	—N/a	—N/a

_{*per team}

== ATP singles main draw entrants ==
=== Seeds ===
Country	Player	Rank^{1}	Seed
FRA	Gaël Monfils	16	1
AUS	Alex de Minaur	22	2
ITA	Lorenzo Sonego	26	3
~~GEO~~	~~Nikoloz Basilashvili~~	~~30~~	~~4~~
~~USA~~	~~Reilly Opelka~~	~~32~~	~~5~~
ESP	Alejandro Davidovich Fokina	35	6
ESP	Albert Ramos Viñolas	38	7
KAZ	Alexander Bublik	39	8
~~GBR~~	~~Cameron Norrie~~	~~41~~	~~9~~

- ^{1} Rankings are as of 14 June 2021.

=== Other entrants ===
The following players received wildcards into the main draw:

- (United Kingdom) Liam Broady
- (United Kingdom) Jay Clarke
- (United Kingdom) James Ward

The following players received entry from the qualifying draw:

- (Australia) James Duckworth
- (Belarus) Ilya Ivashka
- (Kazakhstan) Mikhail Kukushkin
- (Sweden) Mikael Ymer

The following players received entry as lucky losers:

- (Slovakia) Norbert Gombos
- (United Kingdom) Alastair Gray
- (South Korea) Kwon Soon-woo
- (Australia) Max Purcell
- (Italy) Andreas Seppi

=== Withdrawals ===
- (Georgia (country)) Nikoloz Basilashvili → replaced by (Italy) Andreas Seppi
- (Croatia) Marin Čilić → replaced by (Canada) Vasek Pospisil
- (Serbia) Laslo Đere → replaced by (United Kingdom) Alastair Gray
- (United States) Taylor Fritz → replaced by (Japan) Yoshihito Nishioka
- (France) Richard Gasquet → replaced by (Australia) Max Purcell
- (Russia) Aslan Karatsev → replaced by (Finland) Emil Ruusuvuori
- (Serbia) Filip Krajinović → replaced by (Belarus) Egor Gerasimov
- (United Kingdom) Cameron Norrie → replaced by (Slovakia) Norbert Gombos
- (United States) Reilly Opelka → replaced by (South Korea) Kwon Soon-woo
- (France) Benoît Paire → replaced by (Australia) Alexei Popyrin
- (Switzerland) Stan Wawrinka → replaced by (Slovenia) Aljaž Bedene

=== Retirements ===
- (Spain) Alejandro Davidovich Fokina

== ATP doubles main draw entrants ==
=== Seeds ===
Country	Player	Country	Player	Rank^{1}	Seed
CRO	Nikola Mektić	CRO	Mate Pavić	3	1
COL	Juan Sebastián Cabal	COL	Robert Farah	9	2
USA	Rajeev Ram	GBR	Joe Salisbury	21	3
FRA	Fabrice Martin	FRA	Édouard Roger-Vasselin	51	4

- ^{1} Rankings are as of 14 June 2021.

=== Other entrants ===
The following pairs received wildcards into the doubles main draw:

- (United Kingdom) Lloyd Glasspool / (Finland) Harri Heliövaara
- (United Kingdom) Alastair Gray / (United Kingdom) Luke Johnson

=== Withdrawals ===
Before the tournament

- (United Kingdom) Jamie Murray / (Brazil) Bruno Soares → replaced by (United Kingdom) Luke Bambridge / (United Kingdom) Jamie Murray
- (Poland) Łukasz Kubot / (Brazil) Marcelo Melo → replaced by (Kazakhstan) Alexander Bublik / (United States) Nicholas Monroe
- (Croatia) Marin Čilić / (Croatia) Ivan Dodig → replaced by (Monaco) Hugo Nys / (United Kingdom) Jonny O'Mara

During the tournament

- (United Kingdom) Luke Bambridge / (United Kingdom) Jamie Murray

== WTA singles main draw entrants ==
=== Seeds ===
Country	Player	Rank^{1}	Seed
BLR	Aryna Sabalenka	4	1
UKR	Elina Svitolina	6	2
CAN	Bianca Andreescu	7	3
POL	Iga Świątek	9	4
CZE	Karolína Plíšková	10	5
SUI	Belinda Bencic	12	6
BEL	Elise Mertens	17	7
RUS	Anastasia Pavlyuchenkova	19	8

- ^{1} Rankings are as of 14 June 2021.

=== Other entrants ===
The following players received wildcards into the main draw:

- (United Kingdom) Harriet Dart
- (Latvia) Jeļena Ostapenko
- (Australia) Samantha Stosur
- (United Kingdom) Heather Watson

The following players received entry from the qualifying draw:

- (Italy) Camila Giorgi
- (Switzerland) Viktorija Golubic
- (Ukraine) Marta Kostyuk
- (United States) Christina McHale
- (United States) Bernarda Pera
- (Russia) Vera Zvonareva

The following players received entry as lucky losers:

- (United States) Shelby Rogers
- (Latvia) Anastasija Sevastova

=== Withdrawals ===
Before the tournament

- (United States) Sofia Kenin → replaced by (Croatia) Donna Vekić
- (United Kingdom) Johanna Konta → replaced by (Russia) Daria Kasatkina
- (Croatia) Donna Vekić → replaced by (United States) Shelby Rogers
- (United States) Madison Keys → replaced by (Latvia) Anastasija Sevastova

=== Retirements ===
- (Italy) Camila Giorgi (left thigh injury)
- (Russia) Vera Zvonareva (left hip injury)

== WTA doubles main draw entrants ==
=== Seeds ===
Country	Player	Country	Player	Rank^{1}	Seed
USA	Nicole Melichar	NED	Demi Schuurs	19	1
JPN	Shuko Aoyama	JPN	Ena Shibahara	28	2
CHI	Alexa Guarachi	USA	Desirae Krawczyk	33	3
TPE	Chan Hao-ching	TPE	Latisha Chan	36	4

- ^{1} Rankings are as of 14 June 2021.

=== Other entrants ===
The following pairs received wildcards into the doubles main draw:

- (United Kingdom) Harriet Dart / (United Kingdom) Heather Watson

The following pairs received entry using protected rankings:

- (Russia) Veronika Kudermetova / (Russia) Elena Vesnina
- (United States) Bethanie Mattek-Sands / (India) Sania Mirza
- (Australia) Samantha Stosur / (United States) CoCo Vandeweghe

=== Withdrawals ===
Before the tournament

- (United States) Hayley Carter / (Brazil) Luisa Stefani → replaced by (United States) Hayley Carter / (Japan) Nao Hibino
- (Canada) Gabriela Dabrowski / (Russia) Vera Zvonareva → replaced by (United States) Christina McHale / (United States) Sabrina Santamaria
