= 2018 Eastbourne International – Men's doubles =

Men's doubles
- 2018 Eastbourne International

Final
- Champions: (United Kingdom) Luke Bambridge (United Kingdom) Jonny O'Mara
- Runners-up: (United Kingdom) Ken Skupski (United Kingdom) Neal Skupski
- Score: 7–5, 6–4

Details
- Draw: 16
- Seeds: 4

Events
Singles	men	women
Doubles	men	women
← 2017 ·	Eastbourne International	· 2019 →

Luke Bambridge and Jonny O'Mara defeated Ken and Neal Skupski in the final, 7–5, 6–4 to win the men's doubles tennis title at the 2018 Eastbourne International.

Bob and Mike Bryan were the reigning champions, but Bob was unable to compete due to injury. Mike played alongside James Cerretani, but lost in the first round to Scott Clayton and Joe Salisbury.

== Seeds ==
1. (Colombia) Juan Sebastián Cabal / (Colombia) Robert Farah (quarterfinals)
2. (Croatia) Ivan Dodig / (United States) Rajeev Ram (quarterfinals)
3. (South Africa) Raven Klaasen / (New Zealand) Michael Venus (quarterfinals)
4. (United States) Mike Bryan / (United States) James Cerretani (first round)

== Draw ==
=== Key ===
- Q = Qualifier
- WC = Wild card
- LL = Lucky loser
- Alt = Alternate
- ITF = ITF entry
- PR = Protected ranking
- SR = Special ranking
- SE = Special exempt
- JE = Junior exempt
- JR = Junior Accelerator Programme entrant
- CO = College Accelerator Programme entrant
- NG = Next Gen Accelerator Program entrant
- w/o = Walkover
- r = Retired
- d = Defaulted

=== Draw ===
First round
1	(Colombia) JS Cabal (Colombia) R Farah	6	6
(India) D Sharan (New Zealand) A Sitak	4	4
(United Kingdom) D Inglot (Croatia) F Škugor	6^{6}	7	[7]
WC	(United Kingdom) L Bambridge (United Kingdom) J O'Mara	7^{8}	5	[10]
4	(United States) M Bryan (United States) J Cerretani	6^{6}	3
WC	(United Kingdom) S Clayton (United Kingdom) J Salisbury	7^{8}	6
(Sweden) R Lindstedt (France) É Roger-Vasselin	6	6
(Argentina) M González (Argentina) D Schwartzman	3	2
(Poland) M Matkowski (Japan) B McLachlan	2	6^{4}
(United Kingdom) K Skupski (United Kingdom) N Skupski	6	7^{7}
(Chile) N Jarry (Argentina) L Mayer	5	4
3	(South Africa) R Klaasen (New Zealand) M Venus	7	6
(New Zealand) M Daniell (Netherlands) W Koolhof	6^{3}	6	[7]
(United States) R Harrison (United States) N Monroe	7^{7}	3	[10]
(Italy) M Cecchinato (Italy) A Seppi	4	7^{7}	[11]
2	(Croatia) I Dodig (United States) R Ram	6	6^{5}	[13]

Quarterfinals
1	(Colombia) JS Cabal (Colombia) R Farah	6	3	[5]
WC	(United Kingdom) L Bambridge (United Kingdom) J O'Mara	3	6	[10]
WC	(United Kingdom) S Clayton (United Kingdom) J Salisbury	2	5
(Sweden) R Lindstedt (France) É Roger-Vasselin	6	7
(United Kingdom) K Skupski (United Kingdom) N Skupski	6	6
3	(South Africa) R Klaasen (New Zealand) M Venus	2	4
(United States) R Harrison (United States) N Monroe	6	7^{7}
2	(Croatia) I Dodig (United States) R Ram	3	6^{2}

Semifinals
WC	(United Kingdom) L Bambridge (United Kingdom) J O'Mara	6	6
(Sweden) R Lindstedt (France) É Roger-Vasselin	4	3
(United Kingdom) K Skupski (United Kingdom) N Skupski	6	6
(United States) R Harrison (United States) N Monroe	3	3

Final
WC	(United Kingdom) L Bambridge (United Kingdom) J O'Mara	7	6
(United Kingdom) K Skupski (United Kingdom) N Skupski	5	4
