= 2018 Eastbourne International =

- Date: 24–30 June
- Edition: 8th (men); 44th (women)
- Category: ATP 250 (men); WTA Premier (women)
- Draw: 28S / 16D (men); 48S / 16D (women)
- Prize money: €661,085 (men) $753,900 (women)
- Surface: Grass
- Location: Eastbourne, United Kingdom
- Venue: Devonshire Park LTC

Champions

Men's singles
- (Germany) Mischa Zverev

Women's singles
- (Denmark) Caroline Wozniacki

Men's doubles
- (United Kingdom) Luke Bambridge / (United Kingdom) Jonny O'Mara

Women's doubles
- (Canada) Gabriela Dabrowski / (China) Xu Yifan
- Eastbourne International

The 2018 Eastbourne International (also known as the Nature Valley International for sponsorship reasons) is a combined men's and women's tennis tournament played on outdoor grass courts. It was the 44th edition of the event for the women and the 8th edition for the men. The tournament is classified as a WTA Premier tournament on the 2018 WTA Tour and as an ATP World Tour 250 series on the 2018 ATP World Tour. The event took place at the Devonshire Park Lawn Tennis Club in Eastbourne, United Kingdom from 25 Juni until 30 June 2018. Mischa Zverev and Caroline Wozniacki won the singles title.

== Finals ==
=== Men's singles ===
- (Germany) Mischa Zverev defeated (Slovakia) Lukáš Lacko, 6–4, 6–4

=== Women's singles ===
- (Denmark) Caroline Wozniacki defeated (Belarus) Aryna Sabalenka 7–5, 7–6^{(7–5)}

=== Men's doubles ===
- (United Kingdom) Luke Bambridge / (United Kingdom) Jonny O'Mara defeated (United Kingdom) Ken Skupski / (United Kingdom) Neal Skupski, 7–5, 6–4

=== Women's doubles ===
- (Canada) Gabriela Dabrowski / (China) Xu Yifan defeated (Romania) Irina-Camelia Begu / (Romania) Mihaela Buzărnescu 6–3, 7–5

== Points and prize money ==
=== Point distribution ===
Event	W	F	SF	QF	Round of 16	Round of 32	Round of 48	Q	Q2	Q1
Men's singles	250	150	90	45	20	0	—N/a	12	6	0
Men's doubles	250	150	90	45	0	—N/a	—N/a	—N/a	—N/a	—N/a
Women's singles	470	305	185	100	55	30	1	25	13	1
Women's doubles	470	305	185	100	1	—N/a	—N/a	—N/a	—N/a	—N/a

=== Prize money ===
Event	W	F	SF	QF	Round of 16	Round of 32	Round of 48	Q2	Q1
Men's singles	€117,930	€62,115	€33,650	€19,170	€11,295	€6,690	—N/a	€3,010	€1,505
Women's singles	$158,770	$84,505	$42,260	$21,415	$11,140	$5,825	$3,840	$2,125	$1,278
Men's doubles	€35,830	€18,830	€10,210	€5,840	€3,420	—N/a	—N/a	—N/a	—N/a
Women's doubles	$49,950	$26,435	$14,539	$7,410	$4,020	—N/a	—N/a	—N/a	—N/a

== ATP singles main-draw entrants ==
=== Seeds ===
Country	Player	Rank^{1}	Seed
ARG	Diego Schwartzman	11	1
GBR	Kyle Edmund	17	2
CAN	Denis Shapovalov	23	3
ITA	Marco Cecchinato	28	4
ARG	Leonardo Mayer	38	5
ESP	David Ferrer	40	6
USA	Steve Johnson	44	7
~~HUN~~	~~Márton Fucsovics~~	~~45~~	~~8~~

- ^{1} Rankings are as of 18 June 2018.

=== Other entrants ===
The following players received wildcards into the main draw:

- (United Kingdom) Andy Murray
- (United Kingdom) Cameron Norrie
- (Switzerland) Stan Wawrinka

The following players received entry from the qualifying draw:

- (Italy) Matteo Berrettini
- (Germany) Daniel Brands
- (Australia) Alex de Minaur
- (Ecuador) Roberto Quiroz

The following player received entry as a lucky loser:

- (United Kingdom) Jay Clarke

=== Withdrawals ===
- (Ukraine) Alexandr Dolgopolov → replaced by (Chile) Nicolás Jarry
- (Hungary) Márton Fucsovics → replaced by (United Kingdom) Jay Clarke
- (Germany) Peter Gojowczyk → replaced by (Italy) Marco Cecchinato
- (Serbia) Filip Krajinović → replaced by (United States) Taylor Fritz
- (Spain) Feliciano López → replaced by (Slovakia) Lukáš Lacko
- (United States) Tennys Sandgren → replaced by (France) Gilles Simon

== ATP doubles main-draw entrants ==
=== Seeds ===
Country	Player	Country	Player	Rank^{1}	Seed
COL	Juan Sebastián Cabal	COL	Robert Farah	28	1
CRO	Ivan Dodig	USA	Rajeev Ram	46	2
RSA	Raven Klaasen	NZL	Michael Venus	55	3
USA	Mike Bryan	USA	James Cerretani	65	4

- ^{1} Rankings are as of 18 June 2018.

=== Other entrants ===
The following pairs received wildcards into the doubles main draw:

- (United Kingdom) Luke Bambridge / (United Kingdom) Jonny O'Mara
- (United Kingdom) Scott Clayton / (United Kingdom) Joe Salisbury

== WTA singles main-draw entrants ==
=== Seeds ===
Country	Player	Rank^{1}	Seed
DEN	Caroline Wozniacki	2	1
CZE	Karolína Plíšková	7	2
CZE	Petra Kvitová	8	3
GER	Angelique Kerber	11	4
LAT	Jeļena Ostapenko	12	5
GER	Julia Görges	13	6
RUS	Daria Kasatkina	14	7
AUS	Ashleigh Barty	16	8
BEL	Elise Mertens	17	9
SVK	Magdaléna Rybáriková	19	10
LAT	Anastasija Sevastova	20	11
NED	Kiki Bertens	21	12
GBR	Johanna Konta	22	13
CZE	Barbora Strýcová	24	14
AUS	Daria Gavrilova	25	15
ESP	Carla Suárez Navarro	26	16

- ^{1} Rankings are as of 18 June 2018.

=== Other entrants ===
The following players received wildcards into the main draw:

- (United Kingdom) Harriet Dart
- (Australia) Samantha Stosur
- (United Kingdom) Katie Swan
- (United Kingdom) Heather Watson

The following players received entry from the qualifying draw:

- (Ukraine) Kateryna Bondarenko
- (Japan) Kurumi Nara
- (Czech Republic) Kristýna Plíšková
- (Kazakhstan) Yulia Putintseva
- (Czech Republic) Andrea Sestini Hlaváčková
- (Russia) Natalia Vikhlyantseva

The following player received entry as a lucky loser:

- (United States) Sachia Vickery

=== Withdrawals ===
- (United States) Catherine Bellis → replaced by (Belgium) Alison Van Uytvanck
- (Romania) Simona Halep → replaced by (Chinese Taipei) Hsieh Su-wei
- (Japan) Naomi Osaka → replaced by (Estonia) Kaia Kanepi
- (Ukraine) Lesia Tsurenko → replaced by (United States) Sachia Vickery
- (Russia) Elena Vesnina → replaced by (Croatia) Donna Vekić

== WTA doubles main-draw entrants ==
=== Seeds ===
Country	Player	Country	Player	Rank^{1}	Seed
CZE	Andrea Sestini Hlaváčková	CZE	Barbora Strýcová	12	1
SLO	Andreja Klepač	ESP	María José Martínez Sánchez	26	2
TPE	Latisha Chan	CHN	Peng Shuai	27	3
CAN	Gabriela Dabrowski	CHN	Xu Yifan	28	4

- ^{1} Rankings are as of 18 June 2018.

=== Other entrants ===
The following pair received a wildcard into the doubles main draw:

- (United Kingdom) Harriet Dart / (United Kingdom) Katy Dunne
