= 2019 Eastbourne International – Women's doubles =

Women's doubles
- 2019 Eastbourne International

Final
- Champions: (Chinese Taipei) Chan Hao-ching (Chinese Taipei) Latisha Chan
- Runners-up: (Belgium) Kirsten Flipkens (United States) Bethanie Mattek-Sands
- Score: 2–6, 6–3, [10–6]

Events
Singles	men	women
Doubles	men	women
← 2018 ·	Eastbourne International	· 2021 →

Gabriela Dabrowski and Xu Yifan were the defending champions, but lost in the first round to Simona Halep and Raluca Olaru.

Chan Hao-ching and Latisha Chan won the title, defeating Kirsten Flipkens and Bethanie Mattek-Sands in the final, 2–6, 6–3, [10–6].

== Seeds ==
1. (Canada) Gabriela Dabrowski / (China) Xu Yifan (first round)
2. (Australia) Samantha Stosur / (China) Zhang Shuai (first round)
3. (United States) Nicole Melichar / (Czech Republic) Květa Peschke (quarterfinals)
4. (Germany) Anna-Lena Grönefeld / (Netherlands) Demi Schuurs (first round)

== Draw ==
=== Key ===
- Q = Qualifier
- WC = Wild card
- LL = Lucky loser
- Alt = Alternate
- SE = Special exempt
- PR = Protected ranking
- ITF = ITF entry
- JE = Junior exempt
- w/o = Walkover
- r = Retired
- d = Defaulted
- SR = Special ranking

=== Draw ===
First round
1	(Canada) G Dabrowski (China) Y Xu	6^{5}	5
(Romania) S Halep (Romania) R Olaru	7^{7}	7
(Poland) A Rosolska (China) Z Yang	6	4	[10]
(Czech Republic) L Hradecká (Slovenia) A Klepač	2	6	[8]
3	(United States) N Melichar (Czech Republic) K Peschke	4	7^{7}	[10]
WC	(United Kingdom) H Dart (United Kingdom) H Watson	6	6^{1}	[6]
(Belgium) K Flipkens (United States) B Mattek-Sands	6	6
Alt	(Croatia) D Jurak (Slovenia) K Srebotnik	2	4
(United States) R Atawo (Russia) V Zvonareva	6	7^{7}
(Russia) D Kasatkina (Estonia) A Kontaveit	2	6^{5}
(Chinese Taipei) H-c Chan (Chinese Taipei) L Chan	7^{7}	6
4	(Germany) A-L Grönefeld (Netherlands) D Schuurs	6^{2}	4
Alt	(Romania) M Buzărnescu (Germany) A-L Friedsam	6	6
(Ukraine) N Kichenok (United States) A Spears	4	2
(Belarus) A Sabalenka (Ukraine) D Yastremska	6	2	[10]
2	(Australia) S Stosur (China) S Zhang	4	6	[1]

Quarterfinals
(Romania) S Halep (Romania) R Olaru	2	6	[10]
(Poland) A Rosolska (China) Z Yang	6	0	[4]
3	(United States) N Melichar (Czech Republic) K Peschke	3	2
(Belgium) K Flipkens (United States) B Mattek-Sands	6	6
(United States) R Atawo (Russia) V Zvonareva
(Chinese Taipei) H-c Chan (Chinese Taipei) L Chan	w/o
Alt	(Romania) M Buzărnescu (Germany) A-L Friedsam	6	6
(Belarus) A Sabalenka (Ukraine) D Yastremska	2	1

Semifinals
(Romania) S Halep (Romania) R Olaru	7^{7}	2	[8]
(Belgium) K Flipkens (United States) B Mattek-Sands	6^{4}	6	[10]
(Chinese Taipei) H-c Chan (Chinese Taipei) L Chan	6	6
Alt	(Romania) M Buzărnescu (Germany) A-L Friedsam	0	4

Final
(Belgium) K Flipkens (United States) B Mattek-Sands	6	3	[6]
(Chinese Taipei) H-c Chan (Chinese Taipei) L Chan	2	6	[10]
