= 2019 Eastbourne International – Men's doubles =

Men's doubles
- 2019 Eastbourne International

Final
- Champions: (Colombia) Juan Sebastián Cabal (Colombia) Robert Farah
- Runners-up: (Argentina) Máximo González (Argentina) Horacio Zeballos
- Score: 3–6, 7–6^{(7–4)}, [10–6]

Details
- Draw: 16
- Seeds: 4

Events
Singles	men	women
Doubles	men	women
← 2018 ·	Eastbourne International	· 2021 →

Luke Bambridge and Jonny O'Mara were the defending champions but they lost in the first round to Dan Evans and Lloyd Glasspool.

Juan Sebastián Cabal and Robert Farah won the title, defeating Máximo González and Horacio Zeballos in the final, 3–6, 7–6^{(7–4)}, [10–6].

== Seeds ==
1. (Colombia) Juan Sebastián Cabal / (Colombia) Robert Farah (champions)
2. (Argentina) Máximo González / (Argentina) Horacio Zeballos (final)
3. (France) Fabrice Martin / (France) Édouard Roger-Vasselin (semifinals)
4. (United Kingdom) Dominic Inglot / (United States) Austin Krajicek (semifinals)

== Draw ==
=== Key ===
- Q = Qualifier
- WC = Wild card
- LL = Lucky loser
- Alt = Alternate
- SE = Special exempt
- PR = Protected ranking
- ITF = ITF entry
- JE = Junior exempt
- w/o = Walkover
- r = Retired
- d = Defaulted
- SR = Special ranking

=== Draw ===
First round
1	(Colombia) JS Cabal (Colombia) R Farah	6	6
PR	(Brazil) M Melo (United Kingdom) A Murray	2	4
(United Kingdom) L Bambridge (United Kingdom) J O'Mara	7^{10}	4	[6]
WC	(United Kingdom) D Evans (United Kingdom) L Glasspool	6^{8}	6	[10]
4	(United Kingdom) D Inglot (United States) A Krajicek	6	7
Alt	(United States) N Monroe (Spain) F Verdasco	2	5
(United Kingdom) K Skupski (United Kingdom) N Skupski	5	6^{10}
(New Zealand) M Daniell (Netherlands) W Koolhof	7	7^{12}
(Argentina) JI Londero (United Kingdom) C Norrie	3	7^{7}	[5]
(Japan) B McLachlan (Denmark) F Nielsen	6	6^{1}	[10]
WC	(United Kingdom) S Clayton (United Kingdom) J Ward	2	0
3	(France) F Martin (France) É Roger-Vasselin	6	6
(Italy) M Cecchinato (Serbia) D Lajović	2	5
(India) R Bopanna (Uruguay) P Cuevas	6	7
(Moldova) R Albot (Argentina) G Pella	4	4
2	(Argentina) M González (Argentina) H Zeballos	6	6

Quarterfinals
1	(Colombia) JS Cabal (Colombia) R Farah	4	6	[10]
WC	(United Kingdom) D Evans (United Kingdom) L Glasspool	6	3	[8]
4	(United Kingdom) D Inglot (United States) A Krajicek	3	6	[10]
(New Zealand) M Daniell (Netherlands) W Koolhof	6	4	[7]
(Japan) B McLachlan (Denmark) F Nielsen	3	4
3	(France) F Martin (France) É Roger-Vasselin	6	6
(India) R Bopanna (Uruguay) P Cuevas	3	3
2	(Argentina) M González (Argentina) H Zeballos	6	6

Semifinals
1	(Colombia) JS Cabal (Colombia) R Farah	6	7^{12}
4	(United Kingdom) D Inglot (United States) A Krajicek	4	6^{10}
3	(France) F Martin (France) É Roger-Vasselin	6	3	[4]
2	(Argentina) M González (Argentina) H Zeballos	3	6	[10]

Final
1	(Colombia) JS Cabal (Colombia) R Farah	3	7^{7}	[10]
2	(Argentina) M González (Argentina) H Zeballos	6	6^{4}	[6]
