= 2022 Eastbourne International – Women's doubles =

Women's doubles
- 2022 Eastbourne International

Final
- Champions: (Serbia) Aleksandra Krunić (Poland) Magda Linette
- Runners-up: (Ukraine) Lyudmyla Kichenok (Latvia) Jeļena Ostapenko
- Score: walkover

Events
Singles	men	women
Doubles	men	women
← 2021 ·	Eastbourne International	· 2023 →

Aleksandra Krunić and Magda Linette defeated Lyudmyla Kichenok and Jeļena Ostapenko by virtue of walkover to win the women's doubles tennis title at the 2022 Eastbourne International, as Ostapenko incurred a right toe injury before the final match. Krunić and Linette claimed the title by winning only two matches, as their opponents in the semifinals also withdrew. It marked Krunić's sixth career WTA Tour doubles title and Linette's second.

Shuko Aoyama and Ena Shibahara were the defending champions, but they returned to defend their title separately. Aoyama partnered with Chan Hao-ching, but lost in the quarterfinals to Ons Jabeur and Serena Williams. Shibahara partnered with Barbora Krejčíková, but lost in the quarterfinals to Xu Yifan and Yang Zhaoxuan.

== Seeds ==
1. (Czech Republic) Barbora Krejčíková / (Japan) Ena Shibahara (quarterfinals)
2. (Canada) Gabriela Dabrowski / (Mexico) Giuliana Olmos (quarterfinals)
3. (United States) Nicole Melichar-Martinez / (China) Zhang Shuai (first round)
4. (Czech Republic) Lucie Hradecká / (India) Sania Mirza (first round)

== Draw ==
=== Key ===
- Q = Qualifier
- WC = Wild card
- LL = Lucky loser
- Alt = Alternate
- SE = Special exempt
- PR = Protected ranking
- ITF = ITF entry
- JE = Junior exempt
- w/o = Walkover
- r = Retired
- d = Defaulted
- SR = Special ranking

=== Draw ===
First round
1	(Czech Republic) B Krejčíková (Japan) E Shibahara	6	6
(Chile) A Guarachi (Slovenia) A Klepač	3	4
(Chinese Taipei) L Chan (Australia) S Stosur	6	1	[10]
(China) Y Xu (China) Z Yang	2	6	[12]
3	(United States) N Melichar-Martinez (China) S Zhang	6	4	[8]
(Ukraine) L Kichenok (Latvia) J Ostapenko	4	6	[10]
(United States) D Krawczyk (United States) S Rogers	5	4
WC	(United Kingdom) H Dart (United Kingdom) H Watson	7	6
(Czech Republic) M Bouzková (Spain) S Sorribes Tormo	6	3	[11]
WC	(Tunisia) O Jabeur (United States) S Williams	2	6	[13]
(Japan) S Aoyama (Chinese Taipei) H-c Chan	7	6^{3}	[10]
4	(Czech Republic) L Hradecká (India) S Mirza	5	7^{7}	[7]
(Serbia) A Krunić (Poland) M Linette	6	7^{7}
(Kazakhstan) A Danilina (Brazil) B Haddad Maia	2	6^{4}
(Belgium) K Flipkens (France) K Mladenovic	6^{6}	0
2	(Canada) G Dabrowski (Mexico) G Olmos	7^{8}	6

Quarterfinals
1	(Czech Republic) B Krejčíková (Japan) E Shibahara	5	4
(China) Y Xu (China) Z Yang	7	6
(Ukraine) L Kichenok (Latvia) J Ostapenko	4	6	[10]
WC	(United Kingdom) H Dart (United Kingdom) H Watson	6	1	[3]
WC	(Tunisia) O Jabeur (United States) S Williams	6	6
(Japan) S Aoyama (Chinese Taipei) H-c Chan	2	4
(Serbia) A Krunić (Poland) M Linette	6	6
2	(Canada) G Dabrowski (Mexico) G Olmos	1	3

Semifinals
(China) Y Xu (China) Z Yang	5	6^{4}
(Ukraine) L Kichenok (Latvia) J Ostapenko	7	7^{7}
WC	(Tunisia) O Jabeur (United States) S Williams
(Serbia) A Krunić (Poland) M Linette	w/o

Final
(Ukraine) L Kichenok (Latvia) J Ostapenko
(Serbia) A Krunić (Poland) M Linette	w/o
