= 2018 Eastbourne International – Women's singles =

Women's singles
- 2018 Eastbourne International

Final
- Champion: (Denmark) Caroline Wozniacki
- Runner-up: (Belarus) Aryna Sabalenka
- Score: 7–5, 7–6^{(7–5)}

Details
- Draw: 48 (6 Q / 4 WC )
- Seeds: 16

Events
Singles	men	women
Doubles	men	women
← 2017 ·	Eastbourne International	· 2019 →

Karolína Plíšková was the defending champion, but lost in the quarterfinals to Aryna Sabalenka.

Caroline Wozniacki won the title, defeating Sabalenka in the final 7–5, 7–6^{(7–5)}. Wozniacki won the title after saving a match point Angelique Kerber had against her in the semifinals.

== Seeds ==
All seeds received a bye into the second round.

1. (Denmark) Caroline Wozniacki (champion)
2. (Czech Republic) Karolína Plíšková (quarterfinals)
3. (Czech Republic) Petra Kvitová (third round, withdrew due to a hamstring injury)
4. (Germany) Angelique Kerber (semifinals)
5. (Latvia) Jeļena Ostapenko (quarterfinals)
6. (Germany) Julia Görges (second round)
7. (Russia) Daria Kasatkina (quarterfinals)
8. (Australia) Ashleigh Barty (quarterfinals)

9. (Belgium) Elise Mertens (third round)
10. (Slovakia) Magdaléna Rybáriková (second round, retired)
11. (Latvia) Anastasija Sevastova (third round)
12. (Netherlands) Kiki Bertens (second round)
13. (United Kingdom) Johanna Konta (third round)
14. (Czech Republic) Barbora Strýcová (third round)
15. (Australia) Daria Gavrilova (second round)
16. (Spain) Carla Suárez Navarro (second round)

Click on the seed number of a player to go to their draw section.

== Draw ==
=== Key ===
- Q = Qualifier
- WC = Wild card
- LL = Lucky loser
- Alt = Alternate
- ITF = ITF entry
- PR = Protected ranking
- SR = Special ranking
- SE = Special exempt
- JE = Junior exempt
- JR = Junior Accelerator Programme entrant
- CO = College Accelerator Programme entrant
- NG = Next Gen Accelerator Program entrant
- w/o = Walkover
- r = Retired
- d = Defaulted

=== Finals ===
Quarterfinals
1	(Denmark) Caroline Wozniacki	6	6
8	(Australia) Ashleigh Barty	4	3
4	(Germany) Angelique Kerber	6	6^{3}	7^{7}
7	(Russia) Daria Kasatkina	1	7^{7}	6^{3}
5	(Latvia) Jeļena Ostapenko	2	5
(Poland) Agnieszka Radwańska	6	7
(Belarus) Aryna Sabalenka	6	2	7^{7}
2	(Czech Republic) Karolína Plíšková	3	6	6^{5}

Semifinals
1	(Denmark) Caroline Wozniacki	2	7^{7}	6
4	(Germany) Angelique Kerber	6	6^{4}	4
(Poland) Agnieszka Radwańska	3	6	3
(Belarus) Aryna Sabalenka	6	1	6

Final
1	(Denmark) Caroline Wozniacki	7	7^{7}
(Belarus) Aryna Sabalenka	5	6^{5}

=== Top half ===
==== Section 1 ====
First round
(Italy) C Giorgi	6	6
(Romania) I-C Begu	2	2
Q	(Czech Republic) A Sestini Hlaváčková	5	3
(Serbia) A Krunić	7	6
(Chinese Taipei) S-w Hsieh	7^{7}	6
Q	(Russia) N Vikhlyantseva	6^{4}	2
(France) K Mladenovic	6^{2}	7	6
WC	(United Kingdom) H Watson	7^{7}	5	3

Second round
1	(Denmark) C Wozniacki	6	6
(Italy) C Giorgi	2	3
(Serbia) A Krunić	1	3
13	(United Kingdom) J Konta	6	6
10	(Slovakia) M Rybáriková	1	0^{r}
(Chinese Taipei) S-w Hsieh	6	0
(France) K Mladenovic	3	2
8	(Australia) A Barty	6	6

Third round
1	(Denmark) C Wozniacki	4	6	6
13	(United Kingdom) J Konta	6	1	4
(Chinese Taipei) S-w Hsieh	0	4
8	(Australia) A Barty	6	6

Quarterfinals
1	(Denmark) C Wozniacki	6	6
8	(Australia) A Barty	4	3

==== Section 2 ====
First round
(Slovakia) D Cibulková	7	6
(Russia) E Makarova	5	4
WC	(United Kingdom) K Swan	3	6	3
(United States) D Collins	6	3	6
Q	(Czech Republic) Kr Plíšková	5	6	3
WC	(United Kingdom) H Dart	7	3	6
WC	(Australia) S Stosur	7	6^{3}	3
(Belgium) A Van Uytvanck	5	7^{7}	6

Second round
4	(Germany) A Kerber	6	6
(Slovakia) D Cibulková	3	3
(United States) D Collins	6	6
16	(Spain) C Suárez Navarro	2	4
11	(Latvia) A Sevastova	6	6
WC	(United Kingdom) H Dart	3	4
(Belgium) A Van Uytvanck	7	4	1
7	(Russia) D Kasatkina	5	6	6

Third round
4	(Germany) A Kerber	6	6
(United States) D Collins	1	1
11	(Latvia) A Sevastova	4	4
7	(Russia) D Kasatkina	6	6

Quarterfinals
4	(Germany) A Kerber	6	6^{3}	7^{7}
7	(Russia) D Kasatkina	1	7^{7}	6^{3}

=== Bottom half ===
==== Section 3 ====
First round
(Estonia) K Kanepi	6	6
Q	(Japan) K Nara	2	4
(China) S Peng	7	2	1
(Romania) M Buzărnescu	5	6	6
(Poland) A Radwańska	6	6
(Hungary) T Babos	3	1
Q	(Ukraine) K Bondarenko	4	6	6
(France) A Cornet	6	2	4

Second round
5	(Latvia) J Ostapenko	6	7
(Estonia) K Kanepi	3	5
(Romania) M Buzărnescu	3	7^{7}	6
12	(Netherlands) K Bertens	6	6^{5}	3
15	(Australia) D Gavrilova	7	6^{4}	0
(Poland) A Radwańska	5	7^{7}	6
Q	(Ukraine) K Bondarenko	5	3
3	(Czech Republic) P Kvitová	7	6

Third round
5	(Latvia) J Ostapenko	6	6
(Romania) M Buzărnescu	1	2
(Poland) A Radwańska	w/o
3	(Czech Republic) P Kvitová

Quarterfinals
5	(Latvia) J Ostapenko	2	5
(Poland) A Radwańska	6	7

==== Section 4 ====
First round
LL	(United States) S Vickery	6	0	1
(Belarus) A Sabalenka	4	6	6
(Greece) M Sakkari	3	6	4
(Russia) S Kuznetsova	6	3	6
Q	(Kazakhstan) Y Putintseva	5	3
(Croatia) D Vekić	7	6
(Russia) A Pavlyuchenkova	2	7	6
(Romania) S Cîrstea	6	5	4

Second round
6	(Germany) J Görges	6	4	4
(Belarus) A Sabalenka	1	6	6
(Russia) S Kuznetsova	1	1
9	(Belgium) E Mertens	6	6
14	(Czech Republic) B Strýcová	6	6
(Croatia) D Vekić	1	4
(Russia) A Pavlyuchenkova	4	6	3
2	(Czech Republic) Ka Plíšková	6	2	6

Third round
(Belarus) A Sabalenka	7	2	7^{7}
9	(Belgium) E Mertens	5	6	6^{4}
14	(Czech Republic) B Strýcová	3	4
2	(Czech Republic) Ka Plíšková	6	6

Quarterfinals
(Belarus) A Sabalenka	6	2	7^{7}
2	(Czech Republic) Ka Plíšková	3	6	6^{5}

== Qualifying ==
The top three seeds received a bye into the qualifying competition.

=== Seeds ===
1. (Kazakhstan) Yulia Putintseva (qualified)
2. (United States) Bernarda Pera (qualifying competition)
3. (Czech Republic) Kristýna Plíšková (qualified)
4. (United States) Taylor Townsend (first round)
5. (Spain) Lara Arruabarrena (first round)
6. (United States) Sachia Vickery (qualifying competition, lucky loser)
7. (Ukraine) Kateryna Bondarenko (qualified)
8. (United States) Christina McHale (qualifying competition)
9. (Japan) Kurumi Nara (qualified)
10. (Russia) Natalia Vikhlyantseva (qualified)
11. (Netherlands) Arantxa Rus (qualifying competition)
12. (Paraguay) Verónica Cepede Royg (first round)

=== Qualifiers ===
1. (Kazakhstan) Yulia Putintseva
2. (Czech Republic) Andrea Sestini Hlaváčková
3. (Czech Republic) Kristýna Plíšková
4. (Ukraine) Kateryna Bondarenko
5. (Russia) Natalia Vikhlyantseva
6. (Japan) Kurumi Nara

=== Lucky loser ===
1. (United States) Sachia Vickery

=== Draw ===
==== First qualifier ====
First round				Qualifying competition
				1	(Kazakhstan) Yulia Putintseva	6	6
				8	(United States) Christina McHale	4	4
	(Canada) Gabriela Dabrowski	2	4	8	(United States) Christina McHale	4	4
8	(United States) Christina McHale	6	6

==== Second qualifier ====
First round				Qualifying competition
				2	(United States) Bernarda Pera	6	1	0
					(Czech Republic) Andrea Sestini Hlaváčková	3	6	6
	(Czech Republic) Andrea Sestini Hlaváčková	6	7		(Czech Republic) Andrea Sestini Hlaváčková	3	6	6
12	(Paraguay) Verónica Cepede Royg	2	5

==== Third qualifier ====
First round				Qualifying competition
				3	(Czech Republic) Kristýna Plíšková	7^{7}	7
				11	(Netherlands) Arantxa Rus	6^{2}	5
	(Russia) Alla Kudryavtseva	2	2	11	(Netherlands) Arantxa Rus	6^{2}	5
11	(Netherlands) Arantxa Rus	6	6

==== Fourth qualifier ====
First round
4	(United States) Taylor Townsend	4	7^{7}	6^{4}
(Croatia) Ana Konjuh	6	6^{5}	7^{7}
WC	(United Kingdom) Eden Silva	3	2
7	(Ukraine) Kateryna Bondarenko	6	6

Qualifying competition
(Croatia) Ana Konjuh	2	2
7	(Ukraine) Kateryna Bondarenko	6	6

==== Fifth qualifier ====
First round
5	(Spain) Lara Arruabarrena	2	2
(United Kingdom) Katy Dunne	6	6
(United Kingdom) Naomi Broady	3	3
10	(Russia) Natalia Vikhlyantseva	6	6

Qualifying competition
(United Kingdom) Katy Dunne	1	2
10	(Russia) Natalia Vikhlyantseva	6	6

==== Sixth qualifier ====
First round
6	(United States) Sachia Vickery	7^{7}	7^{7}
(Australia) Naiktha Bains	6^{5}	6^{1}
(Australia) Kimberly Birrell	4	4
9	(Japan) Kurumi Nara	6	6

Qualifying competition
6	(United States) Sachia Vickery	2	4
9	(Japan) Kurumi Nara	6	6
