= 2021 Eastbourne International – Women's doubles =

Women's doubles
- 2021 Eastbourne International

Final
- Champions: (Japan) Shuko Aoyama (Japan) Ena Shibahara
- Runners-up: (United States) Nicole Melichar (Netherlands) Demi Schuurs
- Score: 6–1, 6–4

Events
Singles	men	women
Doubles	men	women
← 2019 ·	Eastbourne International	· 2022 →

Shuko Aoyama and Ena Shibahara defeated Nicole Melichar and Demi Schuurs in the final, 6–1, 6–4, to win the women's doubles tennis title at the 2021 Eastbourne International. It marked their fourth title together of the season, and their seventh consecutive win in a final match over two years. The victory earned Aoyama her 16th career WTA Tour doubles title and Shibahara's seventh.

Chan Hao-ching and Latisha Chan were the defending champions from when the event was last held in 2019, but the pair lost in the semifinals to Melichar and Schuurs.

== Seeds ==
1. (United States) Nicole Melichar / (Netherlands) Demi Schuurs (final)
2. (Japan) Shuko Aoyama / (Japan) Ena Shibahara (champions)
3. (Chile) Alexa Guarachi / (United States) Desirae Krawczyk (quarterfinals)
4. (Chinese Taipei) Chan Hao-ching / (Chinese Taipei) Latisha Chan (semifinals)

== Draw ==
=== Key ===
- Q = Qualifier
- WC = Wild card
- LL = Lucky loser
- Alt = Alternate
- SE = Special exempt
- PR = Protected ranking
- ITF = ITF entry
- JE = Junior exempt
- w/o = Walkover
- r = Retired
- d = Defaulted
- SR = Special ranking

=== Draw ===
First round
1	(United States) N Melichar (Netherlands) D Schuurs	4	7	[10]
(Canada) B Andreescu (Kazakhstan) Y Putintseva	6	5	[5]
PR	(United States) B Mattek-Sands (India) S Mirza	3	4
Alt	(United States) C McHale (United States) S Santamaria	6	6
4	(Chinese Taipei) H-c Chan (Chinese Taipei) L Chan	6	6
(United States) H Carter (Japan) N Hibino	0	2
WC	(United Kingdom) H Dart (United Kingdom) H Watson	2	6	[7]
(United States) C Gauff (Latvia) J Ostapenko	6	2	[10]
(Ukraine) L Kichenok (Japan) M Ninomiya	6	7^{7}
PR	(Australia) S Stosur (United States) C Vandeweghe	0	6^{2}
(Ukraine) M Kostyuk (Ukraine) E Svitolina	3	4
3	(Chile) A Guarachi (United States) D Krawczyk	6	6
PR	(Russia) V Kudermetova (Russia) E Vesnina	6^{10}	4
(Canada) S Fichman (Mexico) G Olmos	7^{12}	6
(Czech Republic) L Hradecká (China) S Zhang	2	5
2	(Japan) S Aoyama (Japan) E Shibahara	6	7

Quarterfinals
1	(United States) N Melichar (Netherlands) D Schuurs	6	7
Alt	(United States) C McHale (United States) S Santamaria	4	5
4	(Chinese Taipei) H-c Chan (Chinese Taipei) L Chan	5	6	[12]
(United States) C Gauff (Latvia) J Ostapenko	7	3	[10]
(Ukraine) L Kichenok (Japan) M Ninomiya	0	6	[10]
3	(Chile) A Guarachi (United States) D Krawczyk	6	4	[7]
(Canada) S Fichman (Mexico) G Olmos	3	3
2	(Japan) S Aoyama (Japan) E Shibahara	6	6

Semifinals
1	(United States) N Melichar (Netherlands) D Schuurs	7^{7}	4	[10]
4	(Chinese Taipei) H-c Chan (Chinese Taipei) L Chan	6^{1}	6	[5]
(Ukraine) L Kichenok (Japan) M Ninomiya	5	1
2	(Japan) S Aoyama (Japan) E Shibahara	7	6

Final
1	(United States) N Melichar (Netherlands) D Schuurs	1	4
2	(Japan) S Aoyama (Japan) E Shibahara	6	6
