= 2021 Eastbourne International – Men's singles =

Men's singles
- 2021 Eastbourne International

Final
- Champion: (Australia) Alex de Minaur
- Runner-up: (Italy) Lorenzo Sonego
- Score: 4–6, 6–4, 7–6^{(7–5)}

Events
Singles	men	women
Doubles	men	women
- Eastbourne International

Alex de Minaur defeated Lorenzo Sonego in the final, 4–6, 6–4, 7–6^{(7–5)}, to win the men's singles tennis title at the 2021 Eastbourne International. It was de Minaur's fifth career ATP Tour singles title and his first on grass. Sonego was contesting his second grass final.

Taylor Fritz was the defending champion from when the event was last held in 2019, but he withdrew before the beginning of the tournament after incurring a knee injury during the French Open.

== Seeds ==
The top four seeds received a bye into the second round.

1. (France) Gaël Monfils (second round)
2. (Australia) Alex de Minaur (champion)
3. (Italy) Lorenzo Sonego (final)
4. (Georgia (country)) Nikoloz Basilashvili (withdrew)
5. (United States) Reilly Opelka (withdrew)
6. (Spain) Alejandro Davidovich Fokina (second round, retired)
7. (Spain) Albert Ramos Viñolas (first round)
8. (Kazakhstan) Alexander Bublik (quarterfinals)
9. (United Kingdom) Cameron Norrie (withdrew)

== Draw ==
Key

- Q = Qualifier
- WC = Wild card
- LL = Lucky loser
- Alt = Alternate
- ITF = ITF entry
- PR = Protected ranking
- SR = Special ranking
- SE = Special exempt
- JE = Junior exempt
- JR = Junior Accelerator Programme entrant
- CO = College Accelerator Programme entrant
- NG = Next Gen Accelerator Program entrant
- w/o = Walkover
- r = Retired
- d = Defaulted

=== Finals ===
Semifinals
LL	(Australia) Max Purcell	1	6	1
3	(Italy) Lorenzo Sonego	6	3	6
LL	(South Korea) Kwon Soon-woo	3	6^{2}
2	(Australia) Alex de Minaur	6	7^{7}

Final
3	(Italy) Lorenzo Sonego	6	4	6^{5}
2	(Australia) Alex de Minaur	4	6	7^{7}

=== Top half ===
First round
LL	(Australia) M Purcell	6	3	7^{7}
Q	(Australia) J Duckworth	2	6	6^{5}
LL	(Italy) A Seppi	7^{7}	6
(Japan) Y Nishioka	6^{5}	1
(Finland) E Ruusuvuori	6	6
7	(Spain) A Ramos Viñolas	4	3
(Australia) J Millman	6	6
WC	(United Kingdom) J Clarke	3	2
(France) J-W Tsonga	3	4
(Belarus) E Gerasimov	6	6
Q	(Kazakhstan) M Kukushkin	1	4
8	(Kazakhstan) A Bublik	6	6

Second round
1	(France) G Monfils	4	7	4
LL	(Australia) M Purcell	6	5	6
LL	(Italy) A Seppi	6	6
(Finland) E Ruusuvuori	2	3
3	(Italy) L Sonego	6	6
(Australia) J Millman	4	2
(Belarus) E Gerasimov	2	2
8	(Kazakhstan) A Bublik	6	6

Quarterfinals
LL	(Australia) M Purcell	6	1	6
LL	(Italy) A Seppi	4	6	4
3	(Italy) L Sonego	6	7
8	(Kazakhstan) A Bublik	1	5

Semifinals
LL	(Australia) M Purcell	1	6	1
3	(Italy) L Sonego	6	3	6

=== Bottom half ===
First round
LL	(Slovakia) N Gombos	6	4	1
(Australia) A Popyrin	4	6	6
LL	(United Kingdom) A Gray	2	6^{5}
Q	(Belarus) I Ivashka	6	7^{7}
(Hungary) M Fucsovics	7^{7}	3	7^{7}
(Slovenia) A Bedene	6^{3}	6	6^{3}
6	(Spain) A Davidovich Fokina	7	6
Q	(Sweden) M Ymer	5	1
WC	(United Kingdom) J Ward	4	4
(Canada) V Pospisil	6	6
(United States) F Tiafoe	3	6^{4}
WC	(United Kingdom) L Broady	6	7^{7}

Second round
(Australia) A Popyrin	7^{7}	5	3
Q	(Belarus) I Ivashka	6^{5}	7	6
(Hungary) M Fucsovics	6^{4}	7^{7}	3
LL	(South Korea) S-w Kwon	7^{7}	6^{4}	6
6	(Spain) A Davidovich Fokina	6^{1}	0^{r}
(Canada) V Pospisil	7^{7}	0
WC	(United Kingdom) L Broady	3	4
2	(Australia) A de Minaur	6	6

Quarterfinals
Q	(Belarus) I Ivashka	4	5
LL	(South Korea) S-w Kwon	6	7
(Canada) V Pospisil	4	4
2	(Australia) A de Minaur	6	6

Semifinals
LL	(South Korea) S-w Kwon	3	6^{2}
2	(Australia) A de Minaur	6	7^{7}

== Qualifying ==
=== Seeds ===
1. (South Korea) Kwon Soon-woo (first round, lucky loser)
2. (Slovakia) Norbert Gombos (qualifying competition, lucky loser)
3. (Belarus) Ilya Ivashka (qualified)
4. (Italy) Andreas Seppi (qualifying competition, lucky loser)
5. (Australia) James Duckworth (qualified)
6. (Sweden) Mikael Ymer (qualified)
7. (South Africa) Kevin Anderson (first round)
8. (Kazakhstan) Mikhail Kukushkin (qualified)

=== Qualifiers ===
1. (Australia) James Duckworth
2. (Sweden) Mikael Ymer
3. (Belarus) Ilya Ivashka
4. (Kazakhstan) Mikhail Kukushkin

=== Lucky losers ===
1. (United Kingdom) Alastair Gray
2. (Australia) Max Purcell
3. (Italy) Andreas Seppi
4. (Slovakia) Norbert Gombos
5. (South Korea) Kwon Soon-woo

=== Qualifying draw ===
==== First qualifier ====
First round
1	(South Korea) Kwon Soon-woo	6	2	3
WC	(United Kingdom) Alastair Gray	4	6	6
(Romania) Filip Jianu	4	3
5	(Australia) James Duckworth	6	6

Qualifying competition
WC	(United Kingdom) Alastair Gray	3	6^{4}
5	(Australia) James Duckworth	6	7^{7}

==== Second qualifier ====
First round
2	(Slovakia) Norbert Gombos	6	7^{7}
WC	(United Kingdom) Lui Maxted	4	6^{4}
(France) Geoffrey Blancaneaux	6	2	1
6	(Sweden) Mikael Ymer	1	6	6

Qualifying competition
2	(Slovakia) Norbert Gombos	3	5
6	(Sweden) Mikael Ymer	6	7

==== Third qualifier ====
First round
3	(Belarus) Ilya Ivashka	6	7^{7}
Alt	(Australia) John-Patrick Smith	4	6^{3}
(Australia) Max Purcell	7^{9}	4	6
7	(South Africa) Kevin Anderson	6^{7}	6	3

Qualifying competition
3	(Belarus) Ilya Ivashka	6^{6}	6	6
(Australia) Max Purcell	7^{8}	2	1

==== Fourth qualifier ====
First round
4	(Italy) Andreas Seppi	6	6
(United States) Christian Harrison	3	3
(United States) Nick Chappell	2	3
8	(Kazakhstan) Mikhail Kukushkin	6	6

Qualifying competition
4	(Italy) Andreas Seppi	2	5
8	(Kazakhstan) Mikhail Kukushkin	6	7
