= 2019 Eastbourne International =

- Date: 23–29 June
- Edition: 9th (men); 45th (women)
- Category: ATP 250 (men); WTA Premier (women)
- Draw: 28S / 16D (men); 56S / 16D (women)
- Prize money: €661,085 (men) $998,712 (women)
- Surface: Grass
- Location: Eastbourne, United Kingdom
- Venue: Devonshire Park LTC

Champions

Men's singles
- (United States) Taylor Fritz

Women's singles
- (Czech Republic) Karolína Plíšková

Men's doubles
- (Colombia) Juan Sebastián Cabal / (Colombia) Robert Farah

Women's doubles
- (Chinese Taipei) Chan Hao-ching / (Chinese Taipei) Latisha Chan
- Eastbourne International

The 2019 Eastbourne International (also known as the Nature Valley International for sponsorship reasons) was a combined men's and women's tennis tournament played on outdoor grass courts. It was the 45th edition of the event for the women and the 9th edition for the men. The tournament was classified as a WTA Premier tournament on the 2019 WTA Tour and as an ATP Tour 250 series on the 2019 ATP Tour. The tournament took place at the Devonshire Park Lawn Tennis Club in Eastbourne, United Kingdom between 23 June and 29 June 2019. Taylor Fritz and Karolína Plíšková won the singles titles.

== Finals ==
=== Men's singles ===
- (United States) Taylor Fritz defeated (United States) Sam Querrey, 6–3, 6–4

=== Women's singles ===
- (Czech Republic) Karolína Plíšková defeated (Germany) Angelique Kerber, 6–1, 6–4

=== Men's doubles ===
- (Colombia) Juan Sebastián Cabal / (Colombia) Robert Farah defeated (Argentina) Máximo González / (Argentina) Horacio Zeballos, 3–6, 7–6^{(7–4)}, [10–6]

=== Women's doubles ===
- (Chinese Taipei) Chan Hao-ching / (Chinese Taipei) Latisha Chan defeated (Belgium) Kirsten Flipkens / (United States) Bethanie Mattek-Sands, 2–6, 6–3, [10–6]

== Points and prize money ==
=== Point distribution ===
Event	W	F	SF	QF	Round of 16	Round of 32	Round of 48	Q	Q2	Q1
Men's singles	250	150	90	45	20	0	—N/a	12	6	0
Men's doubles	250	150	90	45	0	—N/a	—N/a	—N/a	—N/a	—N/a
Women's singles	470	305	185	100	55	30	1	25	13	1
Women's doubles	470	305	185	100	1	—N/a	—N/a	—N/a	—N/a	—N/a

=== Prize money ===
Event	W	F	SF	QF	Round of 16	Round of 32	Round of 48	Q2	Q1
Men's singles	€117,930	€62,115	€33,650	€19,170	€11,295	€6,690	—N/a	€3,010	€1,505
Women's singles	$173,680	$92,540	$46,275	$23,455	$12,200	$6,380	$4,205	$2,325	$1,400
Men's doubles	€35,830	€18,830	€10,210	€5,840	€3,420	—N/a	—N/a	—N/a	—N/a
Women's doubles	$54,695	$28,950	$15,925	$8,109	$4,400	—N/a	—N/a	—N/a	—N/a

== ATP singles main draw entrants ==
=== Seeds ===
Country	Player	Rank^{1}	Seed
ARG	Guido Pella	24	1
SRB	Laslo Đere	27	2
GBR	Kyle Edmund	30	3
SRB	Dušan Lajović	31	4
ESP	Fernando Verdasco	37	5
FRA	Gilles Simon	38	6
ITA	Marco Cecchinato	40	7
MDA	Radu Albot	41	8

- ^{1} Rankings are as of 17 June 2019.

=== Other entrants ===
The following players received wildcards into the main draw:

- (United Kingdom) Jay Clarke
- (United Kingdom) Kyle Edmund
- (United Kingdom) Dan Evans

The following player received entry as a special exempt:

- ~~(Spain) Feliciano López~~

The following players received entry from the qualifying draw:

- (Italy) Thomas Fabbiano
- (United Kingdom) Paul Jubb
- (United States) Tennys Sandgren
- (United Kingdom) James Ward

The following players received entry as lucky losers:

- (United States) Denis Kudla
- (Argentina) Juan Ignacio Londero

=== Withdrawals ===
Before the tournament

- (Italy) Matteo Berrettini → replaced by (Argentina) Juan Ignacio Londero
- (France) Richard Gasquet → replaced by (United States) Sam Querrey
- (Germany) Philipp Kohlschreiber → replaced by (United States) Steve Johnson
- (Spain) Feliciano López → replaced by (United States) Denis Kudla

== ATP doubles main draw entrants ==
=== Seeds ===
Country	Player	Country	Player	Rank^{1}	Seed
COL	Juan Sebastián Cabal	COL	Robert Farah	10	1
ARG	Máximo González	ARG	Horacio Zeballos	40	2
FRA	Fabrice Martin	FRA	Édouard Roger-Vasselin	60	3
GBR	Dominic Inglot	USA	Austin Krajicek	70	4

- ^{1} Rankings are as of 17 June 2019.

=== Other entrants ===
The following pairs received wildcards into the doubles main draw:

- (United Kingdom) Scott Clayton / (United Kingdom) James Ward
- (United Kingdom) Dan Evans / (United Kingdom) Lloyd Glasspool

The following pairs received entry as alternates:

- (United States) Nicholas Monroe / (Spain) Fernando Verdasco

=== Withdrawals ===
Before the tournament

- (Argentina) Leonardo Mayer

== WTA singles main draw entrants ==
=== Seeds ===
Country	Player	Rank^{1}	Seed
~~AUS~~	~~Ashleigh Barty~~	~~2~~	~~1~~
CZE	Karolína Plíšková	3	2
NED	Kiki Bertens	4	3
GER	Angelique Kerber	6	4
UKR	Elina Svitolina	7	5
ROU	Simona Halep	8	6
USA	Sloane Stephens	9	7
BLR	Aryna Sabalenka	10	8
~~LAT~~	~~Anastasija Sevastova~~	~~12~~	~~9~~
SUI	Belinda Bencic	13	10
DEN	Caroline Wozniacki	14	11
~~CHN~~	~~Wang Qiang~~	~~15~~	~~12~~
CZE	Markéta Vondroušová	16	13
GBR	Johanna Konta	18	14
~~GER~~	~~Julia Görges~~	~~19~~	~~15~~
EST	Anett Kontaveit	20	16

- ^{1} Rankings are as of 17 June 2019.

=== Other entrants ===
The following players received wildcards into the main draw:

- (United Kingdom) Harriet Dart
- (Romania) Simona Halep
- (Germany) Angelique Kerber
- (United Kingdom) Katie Swan
- (United Kingdom) Heather Watson

The following player received entry using a protected ranking into the singles main draw:

- (Germany) Anna-Lena Friedsam

The following players received entry from the qualifying draw:

- (France) Fiona Ferro
- (Slovenia) Polona Hercog
- (Russia) Veronika Kudermetova
- (United States) Jessica Pegula
- (Australia) Samantha Stosur
- (Ukraine) Dayana Yastremska

The following players received entry as lucky losers:

- (Kazakhstan) Zarina Diyas
- (Australia) Daria Gavrilova
- (Switzerland) Viktorija Golubic
- (Poland) Magda Linette
- (France) Pauline Parmentier
- (Luxembourg) Mandy Minella

=== Withdrawals ===
Before the tournament

- (Canada) Bianca Andreescu → replaced by (Russia) Evgeniya Rodina
- (Australia) Ashleigh Barty → replaced by (Luxembourg) Mandy Minella
- (Slovakia) Dominika Cibulková → replaced by (Sweden) Rebecca Peterson
- (Germany) Julia Görges → replaced by (Kazakhstan) Zarina Diyas
- (Germany) Tatjana Maria → replaced by (Germany) Andrea Petkovic
- (Russia) Anastasia Pavlyuchenkova → replaced by (Slovenia) Tamara Zidanšek
- (United States) Alison Riske → replaced by (Poland) Magda Linette
- (Latvia) Anastasija Sevastova → replaced by (Switzerland) Viktorija Golubic
- (Croatia) Donna Vekić → replaced by (Australia) Daria Gavrilova
- (China) Wang Qiang → replaced by (France) Pauline Parmentier

During the tournament

- (Tunisia) Ons Jabeur (right ankle injury)

=== Retirements ===
- (United States) Danielle Collins (low back injury)
- (Latvia) Jeļena Ostapenko (left hip injury)
- (Czech Republic) Barbora Strýcová (left lower leg injury)

== WTA doubles main draw entrants ==
=== Seeds ===
Country	Player	Country	Player	Rank^{1}	Seed
CAN	Gabriela Dabrowski	CHN	Xu Yifan	20	1
AUS	Samantha Stosur	CHN	Zhang Shuai	21	2
USA	Nicole Melichar	CZE	Květa Peschke	27	3
GER	Anna-Lena Grönefeld	NED	Demi Schuurs	33	4

- ^{1} Rankings are as of 17 June 2019.

=== Other entrants ===
The following pair received a wildcard into the doubles main draw:

- (United Kingdom) Harriet Dart / (United Kingdom) Heather Watson

The following pairs received entry as alternates:

- (Romania) Mihaela Buzărnescu / (Germany) Anna-Lena Friedsam
- (Croatia) Darija Jurak / (Slovenia) Katarina Srebotnik

=== Withdrawals ===
Before the tournament

- (Latvia) Jeļena Ostapenko (left hip injury)
- (China) Zheng Saisai (left hip injury)

During the tournament

- (Russia) Vera Zvonareva (left wrist injury)
