= 2018 Eastbourne International – Men's singles =

Men's singles
- 2018 Eastbourne International

Final
- Champion: (Germany) Mischa Zverev
- Runner-up: (Slovakia) Lukáš Lacko
- Score: 6–4, 6–4

Details
- Draw: 28 (4 Q / 3 WC )
- Seeds: 8

Events
Singles	men	women
Doubles	men	women
- Eastbourne International

Novak Djokovic was the defending champion, but chose not to participate this year.

Mischa Zverev won his first ATP singles title, defeating Lukáš Lacko in the final, 6–4, 6–4. It was his first ATP Tour singles title.

== Seeds ==
The top four seeds received a bye into the second round.

1. (Argentina) Diego Schwartzman (second round)
2. (United Kingdom) Kyle Edmund (quarterfinals)
3. (Canada) Denis Shapovalov (quarterfinals)
4. (Italy) Marco Cecchinato (semifinals)

5. (Argentina) Leonardo Mayer (second round)
6. (Spain) David Ferrer (second round)
7. (United States) Steve Johnson (second round)
8. (Hungary) Márton Fucsovics (withdrew due to hip injury)

== Draw ==
Key

- Q = Qualifier
- WC = Wild card
- LL = Lucky loser
- Alt = Alternate
- ITF = ITF entry
- PR = Protected ranking
- SR = Special ranking
- SE = Special exempt
- JE = Junior exempt
- JR = Junior Accelerator Programme entrant
- CO = College Accelerator Programme entrant
- NG = Next Gen Accelerator Program entrant
- w/o = Walkover
- r = Retired
- d = Defaulted

=== Finals ===
Semifinals
(Slovakia) Lukáš Lacko	6	6
4	(Italy) Marco Cecchinato	3	4
(Germany) Mischa Zverev	7^{11}	6
(Kazakhstan) Mikhail Kukushkin	6^{9}	4

Final
(Slovakia) Lukáš Lacko	4	4
(Germany) Mischa Zverev	6	6

=== Top half ===
First round
Q	(Ecuador) R Quiroz	4	6^{2}
(Slovakia) L Lacko	6	7^{7}
LL	(United Kingdom) J Clarke	6	6
(United States) R Harrison	4	1
WC	(United Kingdom) C Norrie	7	6^{4}	6
Q	(Germany) D Brands	5	7^{7}	2
(Italy) A Seppi	3	7^{7}	6^{4}
(Uzbekistan) D Istomin	6	6^{4}	7^{7}
(Luxembourg) G Müller	7^{7}	3	2
(Australia) J Millman	6^{5}	6	6
(France) G Simon	4	6^{4}
5	(Argentina) L Mayer	6	7^{7}

Second round
1	(Argentina) D Schwartzman	6	4	5
(Slovakia) L Lacko	4	6	7
LL	(United Kingdom) J Clarke	4	3
WC	(United Kingdom) C Norrie	6	6
4	(Italy) M Cecchinato	4	6	7
(Uzbekistan) D Istomin	6	4	5
(Australia) J Millman	7^{9}	7^{7}
5	(Argentina) L Mayer	6^{7}	6^{4}

Quarterfinals
(Slovakia) L Lacko	6	6
WC	(United Kingdom) C Norrie	3	4
4	(Italy) M Cecchinato	5	6	6
(Australia) J Millman	7	3	2

Semifinals
(Slovakia) L Lacko	6	6
4	(Italy) M Cecchinato	3	4

=== Bottom half ===
First round
7	(United States) S Johnson	6	6
(Russia) D Medvedev	2	4
(Chile) N Jarry	6	1	4
(Germany) M Zverev	3	6	6
(United States) J Donaldson	6^{8}	6	7^{7}
(United States) T Fritz	7^{10}	3	6^{3}
6	(Spain) D Ferrer	7	6
Q	(Italy) M Berrettini	5	3
(Kazakhstan) M Kukushkin	6	6
Q	(Australia) A de Minaur	1	2
WC	(Switzerland) S Wawrinka	1	3
WC	(United Kingdom) A Murray	6	6

Second round
7	(United States) S Johnson	3	3
(Germany) M Zverev	6	6
(United States) J Donaldson	4	6	2
3	(Canada) D Shapovalov	6	4	6
6	(Spain) D Ferrer	2	0
(Kazakhstan) M Kukushkin	6	6
WC	(United Kingdom) A Murray	4	4
2	(United Kingdom) K Edmund	6	6

Quarterfinals
(Germany) M Zverev	6	6
3	(Canada) D Shapovalov	3	3
(Kazakhstan) M Kukushkin	5	6	6
2	(United Kingdom) K Edmund	7	3	1

Semifinals
(Germany) M Zverev	7^{11}	6
(Kazakhstan) M Kukushkin	6^{9}	4

== Qualifying ==
=== Seeds ===
1. (United States) Jack Sock (first round)
2. (Australia) Alex de Minaur (qualified)
3. (Italy) Matteo Berrettini (qualified)
4. (United Kingdom) Jay Clarke (qualifying competition, lucky loser)
5. (Russia) Ivan Nedelko (first round)
6. (Ecuador) Roberto Quiroz (qualified)
7. (Germany) Jan Choinski (first round)
8. (Italy) Matteo Viola (qualifying competition)

=== Qualifiers ===
1. (Germany) Daniel Brands
2. (Australia) Alex de Minaur
3. (Italy) Matteo Berrettini
4. (Ecuador) Roberto Quiroz

=== Lucky loser ===
1. (United Kingdom) Jay Clarke

=== Qualifying draw ===
==== First qualifier ====
First round
1/Alt	(United States) Jack Sock	4	6^{4}
(Germany) Daniel Brands	6	7^{7}
(Italy) Alessandro Bega	7	6
5	(Russia) Ivan Nedelko	5	0

Qualifying competition
(Germany) Daniel Brands	6^{4}	7^{7}	6
(Italy) Alessandro Bega	7^{7}	6^{2}	3

==== Second qualifier ====
First round
2	(Australia) Alex de Minaur	6	6
WC	(United Kingdom) Jonathan Gray	1	3
(Australia) Andrew Whittington	6	4	2
8	(Italy) Matteo Viola	4	6	6

Qualifying competition
2	(Australia) Alex de Minaur	6	6
8	(Italy) Matteo Viola	2	4

==== Third qualifier ====
First round
3	(Italy) Matteo Berrettini	6	6
(Italy) Andrea Basso	3	3
(Spain) Carlos Gómez-Herrera	6	6
7	(Germany) Jan Choinski	3	4

Qualifying competition
3	(Italy) Matteo Berrettini	6	7^{7}
(Spain) Carlos Gómez-Herrera	2	6^{3}

==== Fourth qualifier ====
First round
4/WC	(United Kingdom) Jay Clarke	6	7
(Czech Republic) Marek Jaloviec	4	5
(Belgium) Yannick Mertens	6	4	3
6	(Ecuador) Roberto Quiroz	3	6	6

Qualifying competition
4/WC	(United Kingdom) Jay Clarke	7^{8}	4	4
6	(Ecuador) Roberto Quiroz	6^{6}	6	6
