= 2021 Eastbourne International – Women's singles =

Women's singles
- 2021 Eastbourne International

Final
- Champion: (Latvia) Jeļena Ostapenko
- Runner-up: (Estonia) Anett Kontaveit
- Score: 6–3, 6–3

Events
Singles	men	women
Doubles	men	women
← 2019 ·	Eastbourne International	· 2022 →

Jeļena Ostapenko defeated Anett Kontaveit in the final, 6–3, 6–3, to win the women's singles tennis title at the 2021 Eastbourne International. By winning her fourth career WTA Tour singles title, Ostapenko became the tournament's third wildcard champion, following Monica Seles (1996) and Julie Halard-Decugis (2000).

Karolína Plíšková was the defending champion from when the event was last held in 2019, but she lost in the first round to Camila Giorgi. As a result, Plíšková exited the top 10 of the WTA rankings for the first time since September 2016.

== Seeds ==
1. (Belarus) Aryna Sabalenka (quarterfinals)
2. (Ukraine) Elina Svitolina (second round)
3. (Canada) Bianca Andreescu (second round)
4. (Poland) Iga Świątek (second round)
5. (Czech Republic) Karolína Plíšková (first round)
6. (Switzerland) Belinda Bencic (second round)
7. (Belgium) Elise Mertens (first round)
8. (Russia) Anastasia Pavlyuchenkova (first round)

== Draw ==
=== Key ===
- Q = Qualifier
- WC = Wild card
- LL = Lucky loser
- Alt = Alternate
- ITF = ITF entry
- PR = Protected ranking
- SR = Special ranking
- SE = Special exempt
- JE = Junior exempt
- JR = Junior Accelerator Programme entrant
- CO = College Accelerator Programme entrant
- NG = Next Gen Accelerator Program entrant
- w/o = Walkover
- r = Retired
- d = Defaulted

=== Finals ===
Semifinals
Q	(Italy) Camila Giorgi	4^{r}
(Estonia) Anett Kontaveit	5
WC	(Latvia) Jeļena Ostapenko	6	6
(Kazakhstan) Elena Rybakina	4	1

Final
(Estonia) Anett Kontaveit	3	3
WC	(Latvia) Jeļena Ostapenko	6	6

=== Top half ===
First round
1	(Belarus) A Sabalenka	6	6
Q	(United States) B Pera	3	4
(Russia) V Kudermetova	3	4
(United States) A Riske	6	6
LL	(United States) S Rogers	6	7
(Netherlands) K Bertens	1	5
Q	(Italy) C Giorgi	2	6	6
5	(Czech Republic) Ka Plíšková	6	2	2
3	(Canada) B Andreescu	6	2	6
Q	(United States) C McHale	4	6	2
(Estonia) A Kontaveit	6	3	6
(Russia) S Kuznetsova	4	6	3
Q	(Switzerland) V Golubic	6	6
WC	(Australia) S Stosur	2	3
(Croatia) P Martić	1	3
6	(Switzerland) B Bencic	6	6

Second round
1	(Belarus) A Sabalenka	6	6
(United States) A Riske	1	4
LL	(United States) S Rogers	3	6	2
Q	(Italy) C Giorgi	6	4	6
3	(Canada) B Andreescu	3	3
(Estonia) A Kontaveit	6	6
Q	(Switzerland) V Golubic	6	6
6	(Switzerland) B Bencic	4	4

Quarterfinals
1	(Belarus) A Sabalenka	6^{5}	6	4
Q	(Italy) C Giorgi	7^{7}	0	6
(Estonia) A Kontaveit	2	7^{7}	7
Q	(Switzerland) V Golubic	6	6^{2}	5

Semifinals
Q	(Italy) C Giorgi	4^{r}
(Estonia) A Kontaveit	5

=== Bottom half ===
First round
8	(Russia) A Pavlyuchenkova	1	3
WC	(Latvia) J Ostapenko	6	6
(Tunisia) O Jabeur	6	7^{7}
(Czech Republic) M Vondroušová	3	6^{4}
(Russia) D Kasatkina	7	2
Q	(Russia) V Zvonareva	5	2^{r}
WC	(United Kingdom) H Watson	3	7^{7}	5
4	(Poland) I Świątek	6	6^{4}	7
7	(Belgium) E Mertens	6	6^{4}	5
(United States) C Gauff	0	7^{7}	7
LL	(Latvia) A Sevastova	6	6^{6}	6
Q	(Ukraine) M Kostyuk	1	7^{8}	4
WC	(United Kingdom) H Dart	2	7^{7}	4
(Kazakhstan) E Rybakina	6	6^{5}	6
(Spain) P Badosa	6	1	6^{1}
2	(Ukraine) E Svitolina	4	6	7^{7}

Second round
WC	(Latvia) J Ostapenko	5	6	6
(Tunisia) O Jabeur	7	4	3
(Russia) D Kasatkina	4	6	6
4	(Poland) I Świątek	6	0	1
(United States) C Gauff	6	5	2
LL	(Latvia) A Sevastova	4	7	6
(Kazakhstan) E Rybakina	6	7^{7}
2	(Ukraine) E Svitolina	4	6^{3}

Quarterfinals
WC	(Latvia) J Ostapenko	1	7	6
(Russia) D Kasatkina	6	5	2
LL	(Latvia) A Sevastova	6	6^{7}	6^{5}
(Kazakhstan) E Rybakina	2	7^{9}	7^{7}

Semifinals
WC	(Latvia) J Ostapenko	6	6
(Kazakhstan) E Rybakina	4	1

== Qualifying ==
=== Seeds ===
1. (China) Zhang Shuai (qualifying competition)
2. (Kazakhstan) Yulia Putintseva (first round)
3. (Poland) Magda Linette (first round)
4. (United States) Shelby Rogers (qualifying competition, lucky loser)
5. (France) Fiona Ferro (first round)
6. (Latvia) Anastasija Sevastova (qualifying competition, lucky loser)
7. (France) Kristina Mladenovic (qualifying competition)
8. (Chinese Taipei) Hsieh Su-wei (withdrew, still competing in Birmingham)
9. (Ukraine) Marta Kostyuk (qualified)
10. (United States) Bernarda Pera (qualified)
11. (Switzerland) Viktorija Golubic (qualified)
12. (Australia) Ajla Tomljanović (qualifying competition)

=== Qualifiers ===
1. (Ukraine) Marta Kostyuk
2. (Switzerland) Viktorija Golubic
3. (Italy) Camila Giorgi
4. (United States) Bernarda Pera
5. (Russia) Vera Zvonareva
6. (United States) Christina McHale

=== Lucky losers ===
1. (United States) Shelby Rogers
2. (Latvia) Anastasija Sevastova

=== Qualifying draw ===
==== First qualifier ====
First round
1	(China) Zhang Shuai	6	6
(Slovenia) Polona Hercog	1	3
WC	(United Kingdom) Samantha Murray Sharan	5	3
9	(Ukraine) Marta Kostyuk	7	6

Qualifying competition
1	(China) Zhang Shuai	6	4	0
9	(Ukraine) Marta Kostyuk	4	6	6

==== Second qualifier ====
First round
2	(Kazakhstan) Yulia Putintseva	5	5
(United States) Madison Brengle	7	7
WC	(United Kingdom) Sarah Beth Grey	3	0
11	(Switzerland) Viktorija Golubic	6	6

Qualifying competition
(United States) Madison Brengle	6	3	0
11	(Switzerland) Viktorija Golubic	4	6	6

==== Third qualifier ====
First round
3	(Poland) Magda Linette	7^{7}	4	4
(Italy) Camila Giorgi	6^{3}	6	6
(United States) Lauren Davis	1	6^{7}
12	(Australia) Ajla Tomljanović	6	7^{9}

Qualifying competition
(Italy) Camila Giorgi	7	6
12	(Australia) Ajla Tomljanović	5	3

==== Fourth qualifier ====
First round
4	(United States) Shelby Rogers	7	6
(France) Caroline Garcia	5	4
WC	(United Kingdom) Francesca Jones	3	6^{7}
10	(United States) Bernarda Pera	6	7^{9}

Qualifying competition
4	(United States) Shelby Rogers	5	6	0
10	(United States) Bernarda Pera	7	0	6

==== Fifth qualifier ====
First round
5	(France) Fiona Ferro	2	4
PR	(Russia) Vera Zvonareva	6	6
WC	(United Kingdom) Jodie Burrage	6	4	3
7	(France) Kristina Mladenovic	1	6	6

Qualifying competition
PR	(Russia) Vera Zvonareva	6	7
7	(France) Kristina Mladenovic	3	5

==== Sixth qualifier ====
First round
6	(Latvia) Anastasija Sevastova	6	7^{7}
(Japan) Nao Hibino	0	6^{3}
(United States) Christina McHale	6	6
Alt	(China) Zhu Lin	1	1

Qualifying competition
6	(Latvia) Anastasija Sevastova	6	3	5
(United States) Christina McHale	3	6	7
