= 2019 Eastbourne International – Women's singles =

Women's singles
- 2019 Eastbourne International

Final
- Champion: (Czech Republic) Karolína Plíšková
- Runner-up: (Germany) Angelique Kerber
- Score: 6–1, 6–4

Events
Singles	men	women
Doubles	men	women
← 2018 ·	Eastbourne International	· 2021 →

Caroline Wozniacki was the defending champion, but lost in the third round to Aryna Sabalenka in a rematch of the previous year's final.

Karolína Plíšková reached her third Eastbourne final in four years, and claimed her second title, defeating Angelique Kerber in the final 6–1, 6–4.

== Seeds ==
The top eight seeds received a bye into the second round.

1. (Australia) Ashleigh Barty (withdrew)
2. (Czech Republic) Karolína Plíšková (champion)
3. (Netherlands) Kiki Bertens (semifinals)
4. (Germany) Angelique Kerber (final)
5. (Ukraine) Elina Svitolina (second round)
6. (Romania) Simona Halep (quarterfinals)
7. (United States) Sloane Stephens (second round)
8. (Belarus) Aryna Sabalenka (quarterfinals)

9. (Latvia) Anastasija Sevastova (withdrew)
10. (Switzerland) Belinda Bencic (second round)
11. (Denmark) Caroline Wozniacki (third round)
12. (China) Wang Qiang (withdrew)
13. (Czech Republic) Markéta Vondroušová (second round)
14. (United Kingdom) Johanna Konta (third round)
15. (Germany) Julia Görges (withdrew)
16. (Estonia) Anett Kontaveit (second round)

Click on the seed number of a player to go to their draw section.

== Draw ==
=== Key ===
- Q = Qualifier
- WC = Wild card
- LL = Lucky loser
- Alt = Alternate
- ITF = ITF entry
- PR = Protected ranking
- SR = Special ranking
- SE = Special exempt
- JE = Junior exempt
- JR = Junior Accelerator Programme entrant
- CO = College Accelerator Programme entrant
- NG = Next Gen Accelerator Program entrant
- w/o = Walkover
- r = Retired
- d = Defaulted

=== Finals ===
Quarterfinals
(Tunisia) Ons Jabeur	1	7	6
(France) Alizé Cornet	6	5	3
4/WC	(Germany) Angelique Kerber	6	6
6/WC	(Romania) Simona Halep	4	3
8	(Belarus) Aryna Sabalenka	4	6	4
3	(Netherlands) Kiki Bertens	6	3	6
(Russia) Ekaterina Alexandrova	2	0
2	(Czech Republic) Karolína Plíšková	6	6

Semifinals
(Tunisia) Ons Jabeur
4/WC	(Germany) Angelique Kerber	w/o
3	(Netherlands) Kiki Bertens	1	2
2	(Czech Republic) Karolína Plíšková	6	6

Final
4/WC	(Germany) Angelique Kerber	1	4
2	(Czech Republic) Karolína Plíšková	6	6

=== Top half ===
==== Section 1 ====
First round
(Russia) E Rodina	6	6^{3}	5
(Tunisia) O Jabeur	1	7^{7}	7
(Greece) M Sakkari	6	6
Q	(United States) J Pegula	2	1
Q	(Ukraine) D Yastremska	2	4
14	(United Kingdom) J Konta	6	6
LL	(Switzerland) V Golubic	0	7^{7}	6^{6}
LL	(Australia) D Gavrilova	6	6^{2}	7^{8}
WC	(United Kingdom) K Swan	6^{7}	6	4
(China) S Zhang	7^{9}	4	6
(France) A Cornet	7	6
WC	(United Kingdom) H Watson	5	2

Second round
LL	(Luxembourg) M Minella	6	2	1
(Tunisia) O Jabeur	2	6	6
(Greece) M Sakkari	4	6^{4}
14	(United Kingdom) J Konta	6	7^{7}
LL	(Australia) D Gavrilova	3	1
(China) S Zhang	6	6
(France) A Cornet	6	7^{7}
5	(Ukraine) E Svitolina	3	6^{3}

Third round
(Tunisia) O Jabeur	6	6
14	(United Kingdom) J Konta	3	2
(China) S Zhang	2	2
(France) A Cornet	6	6

Quarterfinals
(Tunisia) O Jabeur	1	7	6
(France) A Cornet	6	5	3

==== Section 2 ====
First round
Q	(Australia) S Stosur	6	6
(United States) S Kenin	2	3
(Belarus) A Sasnovich	6	3	2
(Sweden) R Peterson	4	6	6
(Ukraine) L Tsurenko	6	6
LL	(Kazakhstan) Z Diyas	2	2
LL	(France) P Parmentier	7^{7}	2	6
LL	(Poland) M Linette	6^{2}	6	4
Q	(Slovenia) P Hercog	7^{7}	0
(Czech Republic) B Strýcová	6^{3}	1^{r}
(Italy) C Giorgi	3	6	4
(Chinese Taipei) S-w Hsieh	6	4	6

Second round
4/WC	(Germany) A Kerber	6	6
Q	(Australia) S Stosur	4	4
(Sweden) R Peterson	7^{8}	6
(Ukraine) L Tsurenko	6^{6}	4
LL	(France) P Parmentier	6	2	6^{4}
Q	(Slovenia) P Hercog	2	6	7^{7}
(Chinese Taipei) S-w Hsieh	2	0
6/WC	(Romania) S Halep	6	6

Third round
4/WC	(Germany) A Kerber	7^{7}	6
(Sweden) R Peterson	6^{4}	0
Q	(Slovenia) P Hercog	1	6	3
6/WC	(Romania) S Halep	6	4	6

Quarterfinals
4/WC	(Germany) A Kerber	6	6
6/WC	(Romania) S Halep	4	3

=== Bottom half ===
==== Section 3 ====
First round
(Slovenia) T Zidanšek	4	7	7
(Spain) C Suárez Navarro	6	5	5
(Russia) D Kasatkina	7	4	2
(Germany) A Petkovic	5	6	6
(Belgium) K Flipkens	3	4
11	(Denmark) C Wozniacki	6	6
16	(Estonia) A Kontaveit	3	6	6
WC	(United Kingdom) H Dart	6	4	2
Q	(France) F Ferro	2	2
PR	(Germany) A-L Friedsam	6	6
(United States) D Collins	0^{r}
(Kazakhstan) Y Putintseva	5

Second round
8	(Belarus) A Sabalenka	6	6
(Slovenia) T Zidanšek	2	3
(Germany) A Petkovic	4	4
11	(Denmark) C Wozniacki	6	6
16	(Estonia) A Kontaveit	3	4
PR	(Germany) A-L Friedsam	6	6
(Kazakhstan) Y Putintseva	4	1
3	(Netherlands) K Bertens	6	6

Third round
8	(Belarus) A Sabalenka	2	6	7^{7}
11	(Denmark) C Wozniacki	6	4	6^{5}
PR	(Germany) A-L Friedsam	3	3
3	(Netherlands) K Bertens	6	6

Quarterfinals
8	(Belarus) A Sabalenka	4	6	4
3	(Netherlands) K Bertens	6	3	6

==== Section 4 ====
First round
(Romania) M Buzărnescu	4	4
(Latvia) J Ostapenko	6	6
(Australia) A Tomljanović	2	6^{1}
(Russia) E Alexandrova	6	7^{7}
Q	(Russia) V Kudermetova	3	4
10	(Switzerland) B Bencic	6	6
13	(Czech Republic) M Vondroušová	6	6
(China) S Zheng	2	3
(Puerto Rico) M Puig	4	6^{2}
(Belgium) E Mertens	6	7^{7}
(Russia) M Gasparyan	6	6
(Czech Republic) K Siniaková	3	3

Second round
7	(United States) S Stephens	6	0	3
(Latvia) J Ostapenko	1	6	6
(Russia) E Alexandrova	6^{6}	6	6
10	(Switzerland) B Bencic	7^{8}	2	3
13	(Czech Republic) M Vondroušová	1	7	2
(Belgium) E Mertens	6	5	6
(Russia) M Gasparyan	3	3
2	(Czech Republic) Ka Plíšková	6	6

Third round
(Latvia) J Ostapenko	3	1^{r}
(Russia) E Alexandrova	6	2
(Belgium) E Mertens	1	2
2	(Czech Republic) Ka Plíšková	6	6

Quarterfinals
(Russia) E Alexandrova	2	0
2	(Czech Republic) Ka Plíšková	6	6

== Qualifying ==
=== Seeds ===
1. (Ukraine) Dayana Yastremska (qualified)
2. (Russia) Veronika Kudermetova (qualified)
3. (Slovenia) Polona Hercog (qualified)
4. (Poland) Iga Świątek (first round)
5. (Australia) Daria Gavrilova (qualifying competition, lucky loser)
6. (United States) Jessica Pegula (qualified)
7. (Poland) Magda Linette (qualifying competition, lucky loser)
8. (Canada) Eugenie Bouchard (first round)
9. (France) Pauline Parmentier (qualifying competition, lucky loser)
10. (Switzerland) Viktorija Golubic (qualifying competition, lucky loser)
11. (Australia) Astra Sharma (first round)
12. (Kazakhstan) Zarina Diyas (qualifying competition, lucky loser)

=== Qualifiers ===
1. (Ukraine) Dayana Yastremska
2. (Russia) Veronika Kudermetova
3. (Slovenia) Polona Hercog
4. (Australia) Samantha Stosur
5. (France) Fiona Ferro
6. (United States) Jessica Pegula

=== Lucky losers ===
1. (Australia) Daria Gavrilova
2. (Poland) Magda Linette
3. (France) Pauline Parmentier
4. (Switzerland) Viktorija Golubic
5. (Kazakhstan) Zarina Diyas
6. (Luxembourg) Mandy Minella

=== Draw ===
==== First qualifier ====
First round
1	(Ukraine) Dayana Yastremska	6	7^{7}
WC	(United Kingdom) Freya Christie	0	6^{5}
(Switzerland) Timea Bacsinszky	4	6^{1}
10	(Switzerland) Viktorija Golubic	6	7^{7}

Qualifying competition
1	(Ukraine) Dayana Yastremska	6	6
10	(Switzerland) Viktorija Golubic	4	1

==== Second qualifier ====
First round
2	(Russia) Veronika Kudermetova	4	6	6
(United States) Bernarda Pera	6	3	3
WC	(United Kingdom) Alicia Barnett	1	1
12	(Kazakhstan) Zarina Diyas	6	6

Qualifying competition
2	(Russia) Veronika Kudermetova	7^{7}	7
12	(Kazakhstan) Zarina Diyas	6^{4}	5

==== Third qualifier ====
First round
3	(Slovenia) Polona Hercog	7	6
(Switzerland) Jil Teichmann	5	4
(Australia) Lizette Cabrera	5	5
9	(France) Pauline Parmentier	7	7

Qualifying competition
3	(Slovenia) Polona Hercog	4	6	6
9	(France) Pauline Parmentier	6	1	4

==== Fourth qualifier ====
First round
4	(Poland) Iga Świątek	0	3
(Australia) Samantha Stosur	6	6
(Poland) Urszula Radwańska	6^{3}	1
7	(Poland) Magda Linette	7^{7}	6

Qualifying competition
(Australia) Samantha Stosur	6	6
7	(Poland) Magda Linette	4	4

==== Fifth qualifier ====
First round
5/WC	(Australia) Daria Gavrilova	6	6
(Belarus) Vera Lapko	4	0
(France) Fiona Ferro	6	6
8	(Canada) Eugenie Bouchard	2	0

Qualifying competition
5/WC	(Australia) Daria Gavrilova	3	0
(France) Fiona Ferro	6	6

==== Sixth qualifier ====
First round
6	(United States) Jessica Pegula	6	7
(Switzerland) Stefanie Vögele	3	5
(Luxembourg) Mandy Minella	2	7	6
11/WC	(Australia) Astra Sharma	6	5	2

Qualifying competition
6	(United States) Jessica Pegula	6	0
(Luxembourg) Mandy Minella	2	0^{r}
