= 2022 Eastbourne International =

- Date: 19–25 June
- Edition: 11th (men); 47th (women)
- Category: ATP 250 (men); WTA 500 (women)
- Draw: 28S / 16D (men); 48S / 16D (women)
- Prize money: $760,750 (men) $757,900 (women)
- Surface: Grass
- Location: Eastbourne, United Kingdom
- Venue: Devonshire Park LTC

Champions

Men's singles
- (United States) Taylor Fritz

Women's singles
- (Czech Republic) Petra Kvitová

Men's doubles
- (Croatia) Nikola Mektić / (Croatia) Mate Pavić

Women's doubles
- (Serbia) Aleksandra Krunić / (Poland) Magda Linette
- Eastbourne International

The 2022 Eastbourne International (also known as the Rothesay International Eastbourne for sponsorship reasons) was a combined men's and women's tennis tournament played on outdoor grass courts. It was the 47th edition of the event for the women and the 11th edition for the men. The tournament was classified as a WTA 500 tournament on the 2022 WTA Tour and as an ATP Tour 250 series on the 2022 ATP Tour. The tournament took place at the Devonshire Park Lawn Tennis Club in Eastbourne, United Kingdom between 19 and 25 June 2022.

== Champions ==
=== Men's singles ===
- (United States) Taylor Fritz def. (United States) Maxime Cressy, 6–2, 6–7^{(4–7)}, 7–6^{(7–4)}

This is Fritz's second title of the year and third of his career.

=== Women's singles ===
- (Czech Republic) Petra Kvitová def. (Latvia) Jeļena Ostapenko 6–3, 6–2

This is Kvitová's first title of the year and 29th of her career.

=== Men's doubles ===
- (Croatia) Nikola Mektić / (Croatia) Mate Pavić def. (Netherlands) Matwé Middelkoop / (Australia) Luke Saville, 6–4, 6–2

=== Women's doubles ===
- (Serbia) Aleksandra Krunić / (Poland) Magda Linette def. (Ukraine) Lyudmyla Kichenok / (Latvia) Jeļena Ostapenko, by walkover

== Points and prize money ==
=== Point distribution ===
Event	W	F	SF	QF	Round of 16	Round of 32	Q	Q2	Q1
Singles - Men's	250	150	90	45	20	0	12	6	0
Singles - Women's	470	305	185	100	55	1			
Doubles - Men's	250	150	90	45	0	N/A	N/A	N/A	N/A
Doubles - Women's									

=== Prize money ===
Event	W	F	SF	QF	Round of 16	Round of 32	Q2	Q1
Singles	€53,680	€38,485	€27,400	€18,265	€11,740	€7,065	€3,450	€1,795
Singles - Women's	$116,340	$71,960	$36,200	$17,775				
Doubles*	€20,050	€14,350	€9,460	€6,145	€3,600	—N/a	—N/a	—N/a
Doubles - Women's*								

_{*per team}

== ATP singles main draw entrants ==
=== Seeds ===
Country	Player	Rank^{1}	Seed
GBR	Cameron Norrie	11	1
ITA	Jannik Sinner	13	2
USA	Taylor Fritz	14	3
ARG	Diego Schwartzman	16	4
USA	Reilly Opelka	18	5
AUS	Alex de Minaur	21	6
USA	Frances Tiafoe	27	7
DEN	Holger Rune	28	8

- ^{1} Rankings are as of 13 June 2022.

=== Other entrants ===
The following players received wildcards into the main draw:

- (United Kingdom) Jay Clarke
- (United Kingdom) Jack Draper
- (United Kingdom) Ryan Peniston

The following players received entry from the qualifying draw:

- (Australia) James Duckworth
- (Australia) John Millman
- (Brazil) Thiago Monteiro
- (United States) Brandon Nakashima

=== Withdrawals ===
Before the tournament

- (Croatia) Marin Čilić → replaced by (France) Ugo Humbert
- (France) Gaël Monfils → replaced by (Argentina) Francisco Cerúndolo

== ATP doubles main draw entrants ==
=== Seeds ===
Country	Player	Country	Player	Rank^{1}	Seed
CRO	Nikola Mektić	CRO	Mate Pavić	9	1
COL	Juan Sebastián Cabal	COL	Robert Farah	24	2
AUS	John Peers	SVK	Filip Polášek	31	3
CRO	Ivan Dodig	USA	Austin Krajicek	39	4

- ^{1} Rankings are as of 13 June 2022.

=== Other entrants ===
The following pairs received wildcards into the doubles main draw:

- (United Kingdom) Julian Cash / (United Kingdom) Henry Patten
- (United Kingdom) Jonny O'Mara / (United Kingdom) Ken Skupski

=== Withdrawals ===
Before the tournament

- (Italy) Simone Bolelli / (Italy) Fabio Fognini → replaced by (United States) Maxime Cressy / (France) Ugo Humbert
- (Netherlands) Wesley Koolhof / (United Kingdom) Neal Skupski → replaced by (Netherlands) Matwé Middelkoop / (Australia) Luke Saville
- (Germany) Tim Pütz / (New Zealand) Michael Venus → replaced by (Kazakhstan) Aleksandr Nedovyesov / (Pakistan) Aisam-ul-Haq Qureshi
- (United States) Rajeev Ram / (United Kingdom) Joe Salisbury → replaced by (Sweden) André Göransson / (Japan) Ben McLachlan

== WTA singles main draw entrants ==
=== Seeds ===
Country	Player	Rank^{1}	Seed
ESP	Paula Badosa	3	1
~~TUN~~	~~Ons Jabeur~~	~~4~~	~~2~~
GRE	Maria Sakkari	6	3
CZE	Karolína Plíšková	7	4
ESP	Garbiñe Muguruza	10	5
~~USA~~	~~Coco Gauff~~	~~13~~	~~6~~
CZE	Barbora Krejčíková	14	7
LAT	Jeļena Ostapenko	16	8
KAZ	Elena Rybakina	21	9
SUI	Jil Teichmann	22	10
USA	Madison Keys	23	11
ITA	Camila Giorgi	25	12
BEL	Elise Mertens	30	13
CZE	Petra Kvitová	31	14
BRA	Beatriz Haddad Maia	32	15
KAZ	Yulia Putintseva	33	16
USA	Alison Riske	35	17

- ^{1} Rankings are as of 13 June 2022.

=== Other entrants ===
The following players received wildcards into the main draw:

- (United Kingdom) Katie Boulter
- (United Kingdom) Jodie Burrage
- (United Kingdom) Harriet Dart

The following players received entry from the qualifying draw:

- (Belgium) Kirsten Flipkens
- (Serbia) Aleksandra Krunić
- (Ukraine) Lesia Tsurenko
- (Croatia) Donna Vekić

The following players received entry as lucky losers:

- (Canada) Rebecca Marino
- (Bulgaria) Viktoriya Tomova
- (United Kingdom) Heather Watson

=== Withdrawals ===
Before the tournament

- (United States) Danielle Collins → replaced by (China) Zheng Qinwen
- (Canada) Leylah Fernandez → replaced by (Ukraine) Marta Kostyuk
- (United States) Coco Gauff → replaced by (United Kingdom) Heather Watson
- (United States) Sofia Kenin → replaced by (Poland) Magdalena Fręch
- (Estonia) Anett Kontaveit → replaced by (Ukraine) Dayana Yastremska
- (Tunisia) Ons Jabeur → replaced by (Bulgaria) Viktoriya Tomova
- (United States) Jessica Pegula → replaced by (Colombia) Camila Osorio
- (Egypt) Mayar Sherif → replaced by (Czech Republic) Marie Bouzková
- (Denmark) Clara Tauson → replaced by (Hungary) Panna Udvardy
- (Czech Republic) Markéta Vondroušová → replaced by (Belgium) Maryna Zanevska
- (China) Zhang Shuai → replaced by (Canada) Rebecca Marino

== WTA doubles main draw entrants ==
=== Seeds ===
Country	Player	Country	Player	Rank^{1}	Seed
CZE	Barbora Krejčíková	JPN	Ena Shibahara	15	1
CAN	Gabriela Dabrowski	MEX	Giuliana Olmos	20	2
USA	Nicole Melichar-Martinez	CHN	Zhang Shuai	33	3
CZE	Lucie Hradecká	IND	Sania Mirza	42	4

- ^{1} Rankings are as of 13 June 2022.

=== Other entrants ===
The following pairs received wildcards into the doubles main draw:

- (United Kingdom) Harriet Dart / (United Kingdom) Heather Watson
- (Tunisia) Ons Jabeur / (United States) Serena Williams

=== Withdrawals ===
Before the tournament

- (United States) Desirae Krawczyk / (Netherlands) Demi Schuurs → replaced by (United States) Desirae Krawczyk / (Romania) Monica Niculescu
