= 2019 Eastbourne International – Men's singles =

Men's singles
- 2019 Eastbourne International

Final
- Champion: (United States) Taylor Fritz
- Runner-up: (United States) Sam Querrey
- Score: 6–3, 6–4

Events
Singles	men	women
Doubles	men	women
- Eastbourne International

Mischa Zverev was the defending champion, but chose not to participate this year.

Taylor Fritz won his first ATP Tour title, defeating Sam Querrey in the final, 6–3, 6–4.

== Seeds ==
The top four seeds receive a bye into the second round.

1. (Argentina) Guido Pella (second round)
2. (Serbia) Laslo Đere (second round)
3. (United Kingdom) Kyle Edmund (semifinals)
4. (Serbia) Dušan Lajović (second round)
5. (Spain) Fernando Verdasco (quarterfinals)
6. (France) Gilles Simon (quarterfinals)
7. (Italy) Marco Cecchinato (first round)
8. (Moldova) Radu Albot (first round)

== Draw ==
Key

- Q = Qualifier
- WC = Wild card
- LL = Lucky loser
- Alt = Alternate
- ITF = ITF entry
- PR = Protected ranking
- SR = Special ranking
- SE = Special exempt
- JE = Junior exempt
- JR = Junior Accelerator Programme entrant
- CO = College Accelerator Programme entrant
- NG = Next Gen Accelerator Program entrant
- w/o = Walkover
- r = Retired
- d = Defaulted

=== Finals ===
Semifinals
(United States) Taylor Fritz	7^{10}	6
3/WC	(United Kingdom) Kyle Edmund	6^{8}	3
(United States) Sam Querrey	6	6^{4}	6
Q	(Italy) Thomas Fabbiano	3	7^{7}	3

Final
(United States) Taylor Fritz	6	6
(United States) Sam Querrey	3	4

=== Top half ===
First round
Q	(United Kingdom) P Jubb	2	3
(United States) T Fritz	6	6
(United States) S Johnson	7^{7}	6
(United States) R Opelka	6^{4}	3
(Poland) H Hurkacz	6	6
7	(Italy) M Cecchinato	4	4
(United Kingdom) C Norrie	6	7^{7}
(France) J Chardy	3	6^{4}
(France) P-H Herbert	5	7^{10}	6
LL	(United States) D Kudla	7	6^{8}	4
WC	(United Kingdom) D Evans	7^{7}	6
8	(Moldova) R Albot	6^{2}	2

Second round
1	(Argentina) G Pella	4	6	4
(United States) T Fritz	6	3	6
(United States) S Johnson	3	6^{6}
(Poland) H Hurkacz	6	7^{8}
3/WC	(United Kingdom) K Edmund	6	6
(United Kingdom) C Norrie	2	2
(France) P-H Herbert	3	5
WC	(United Kingdom) D Evans	6	7

Quarterfinals
(United States) T Fritz	6	7^{7}
(Poland) H Hurkacz	4	6^{5}
3/WC	(United Kingdom) K Edmund	1	6	6
WC	(United Kingdom) D Evans	6	3	4

Semifinals
(United States) T Fritz	7^{10}	6
3/WC	(United Kingdom) K Edmund	6^{8}	3

=== Bottom half ===
First round
5	(Spain) F Verdasco	6^{3}	6	6
(Australia) J Millman	7^{7}	4	1
WC	(United Kingdom) J Clarke	7^{7}	1	3
LL	(Argentina) JI Londero	6^{5}	6	6
(Kazakhstan) M Kukushkin	3	6^{4}
(United States) S Querrey	6	7^{7}
6	(France) G Simon	7	6
Q	(United States) T Sandgren	5	1
(Chile) N Jarry	6	7^{7}
(Uruguay) P Cuevas	1	6^{4}
Q	(United Kingdom) J Ward	6	3	1
Q	(Italy) T Fabbiano	2	6	6

Second round
5	(Spain) F Verdasco	6^{4}	6	7^{7}
LL	(Argentina) JI Londero	7^{7}	3	6^{2}
(United States) S Querrey	6	6
4	(Serbia) D Lajović	2	3
6	(France) G Simon	6	6
(Chile) N Jarry	2	4
Q	(Italy) T Fabbiano	7^{7}	7^{8}
2	(Serbia) L Đere	6^{5}	6^{6}

Quarterfinals
5	(Spain) F Verdasco	6^{4}	2
(United States) S Querrey	7^{7}	6
6	(France) G Simon	4	3
Q	(Italy) T Fabbiano	6	6

Semifinals
(United States) S Querrey	6	6^{4}	6
Q	(Italy) T Fabbiano	3	7^{7}	3

== Qualifying ==
=== Seeds ===
1. (Argentina) Juan Ignacio Londero (qualifying competition, lucky loser)
2. (United States) Denis Kudla (qualifying competition, lucky loser)
3. (Russia) Andrey Rublev (qualifying competition)
4. (Kazakhstan) Alexander Bublik (qualifying competition)
5. (South Africa) Lloyd Harris (first round)
6. (United States) Tennys Sandgren (qualified)
7. (Italy) Thomas Fabbiano (qualified)
8. (Uzbekistan) Denis Istomin (first round)

=== Qualifiers ===
1. (Italy) Thomas Fabbiano
2. (United Kingdom) James Ward
3. (United Kingdom) Paul Jubb
4. (United States) Tennys Sandgren

=== Lucky losers ===
1. (Argentina) Juan Ignacio Londero
2. (United States) Denis Kudla

=== Qualifying draw ===
==== First qualifier ====
First round
1	(Argentina) Juan Ignacio Londero	6	6
(Argentina) Guido Andreozzi	3	4
Alt	(France) Kenny de Schepper	6	3	6^{4}
7	(Italy) Thomas Fabbiano	2	6	7^{7}

Qualifying competition
1	(Argentina) Juan Ignacio Londero	5	4
7	(Italy) Thomas Fabbiano	7	6

==== Second qualifier ====
First round
2	(United States) Denis Kudla	6	7
(Germany) Daniel Masur	3	5
WC	(United Kingdom) James Ward	4	7^{9}	6
5	(South Africa) Lloyd Harris	6	6^{7}	4

Qualifying competition
2	(United States) Denis Kudla	3	2
WC	(United Kingdom) James Ward	6	6

==== Third qualifier ====
First round
3	(Russia) Andrey Rublev	7	6^{1}	6
(Australia) Max Purcell	5	7^{7}	3
WC	(United Kingdom) Paul Jubb	6	5	7^{8}
8	(Uzbekistan) Denis Istomin	2	7	6^{6}

Qualifying competition
3	(Russia) Andrey Rublev	6	3	2
WC	(United Kingdom) Paul Jubb	4	6	6

==== Fourth qualifier ====
First round
4	(Kazakhstan) Alexander Bublik	4	6	6
(Canada) Steven Diez	6	0	3
(United States) Thai-Son Kwiatkowski	4	1
6	(United States) Tennys Sandgren	6	6

Qualifying competition
4	(Kazakhstan) Alexander Bublik	6	4	3
6	(United States) Tennys Sandgren	4	6	6
