= 2021 Eastbourne International – Men's doubles =

Men's doubles
- 2021 Eastbourne International

Final
- Champion: (Croatia) Nikola Mektić (Croatia) Mate Pavić
- Runner-up: (United States) Rajeev Ram (United Kingdom) Joe Salisbury
- Score: 6–4, 6–3

Details
- Draw: 16
- Seeds: 4

Events
Singles	men	women
Doubles	men	women
- Eastbourne International

Nikola Mektić and Mate Pavić defeated Rajeev Ram and Joe Salisbury in the final, 6–4, 6–3, to win the men's doubles tennis title at the 2021 Eastbourne International. It was the top seeds' seventh career ATP Tour doubles title of the season and they saved five match points in their semifinal match against Lloyd Glasspool and Harri Heliövaara en route to the title.

Juan Sebastián Cabal and Robert Farah were the defending champions from when the tournament was last held in 2019, but the pair lost in the semifinals to Ram and Salisbury.

== Seeds ==
1. (Croatia) Nikola Mektić / (Croatia) Mate Pavić (champions)
2. (Colombia) Juan Sebastián Cabal / (Colombia) Robert Farah (semifinals)
3. (United States) Rajeev Ram / (United Kingdom) Joe Salisbury (final)
4. (France) Fabrice Martin / (France) Édouard Roger-Vasselin (first round)

== Draw ==
Key

- Q = Qualifier
- WC = Wild card
- LL = Lucky loser
- Alt = Alternate
- ITF = ITF entry
- PR = Protected ranking
- SR = Special ranking
- SE = Special exempt
- JE = Junior exempt
- JR = Junior Accelerator Programme entrant
- CO = College Accelerator Programme entrant
- NG = Next Gen Accelerator Program entrant
- w/o = Walkover
- r = Retired
- d = Defaulted

=== Draw ===
First round
1	(Croatia) N Mektić (Croatia) M Pavić	7^{7}	7^{7}
(Uruguay) A Behar (Ecuador) G Escobar	6^{5}	6^{3}
(India) R Bopanna (India) D Sharan	7	6
WC	(United Kingdom) A Gray (United Kingdom) L Johnson	5	3
4	(France) F Martin (France) É Roger-Vasselin	4	4
(United Kingdom) L Bambridge (United Kingdom) J Murray	6	6
(Australia) M Purcell (Australia) L Saville	2	3
WC	(United Kingdom) L Glasspool (Finland) H Heliövaara	6	6
(Kazakhstan) A Bublik (United States) N Monroe	3	3
(Australia) J Peers (Australia) J-P Smith	6	6
(Denmark) F Nielsen (Croatia) F Škugor	5	3
3	(United States) R Ram (United Kingdom) J Salisbury	7	6
(United Kingdom) K Skupski (United Kingdom) N Skupski	6	3	[8]
(Monaco) H Nys (United Kingdom) J O'Mara	2	6	[10]
(South Africa) R Klaasen (Japan) B McLachlan	7^{7}	6^{2}	[3]
2	(Colombia) JS Cabal (Colombia) R Farah	6^{3}	7^{7}	[10]

Quarterfinals
1	(Croatia) N Mektić (Croatia) M Pavić	6	7^{7}
(India) R Bopanna (India) D Sharan	3	6^{3}
(United Kingdom) L Bambridge (United Kingdom) J Murray
WC	(United Kingdom) L Glasspool (Finland) H Heliövaara	w/o
(Australia) J Peers (Australia) J-P Smith	2	3
3	(United States) R Ram (United Kingdom) J Salisbury	6	6
(Monaco) H Nys (United Kingdom) J O'Mara	5	4
2	(Colombia) JS Cabal (Colombia) R Farah	7	6

Semifinals
1	(Croatia) N Mektić (Croatia) M Pavić	6	6^{5}	[18]
WC	(United Kingdom) L Glasspool (Finland) H Heliövaara	4	7^{7}	[16]
3	(United States) R Ram (United Kingdom) J Salisbury	6	6^{0}	[10]
2	(Colombia) JS Cabal (Colombia) R Farah	0	7^{7}	[6]

Final
1	(Croatia) N Mektić (Croatia) M Pavić	6	6
3	(United States) R Ram (United Kingdom) J Salisbury	4	3
