= 2025 Eastbourne Open – Men's singles =

Men's singles
- 2025 Eastbourne Open

Final
- Champion: (United States) Taylor Fritz
- Runner-up: (United States) Jenson Brooksby
- Score: 7−5, 6−1

Details
- Draw: 28
- Seeds: 8

Events
Singles	men	women
Doubles	men	women
← 2024 ·	Eastbourne Open	· 2026 →

Defending champion Taylor Fritz defeated Jenson Brooksby in the final, 7−5, 6−1 to win the men's singles tennis title at the 2025 Eastbourne Open. It was a record-extending fourth title at the tournament, his fifth career title on grass courts, and tenth ATP Tour title overall. Brooksby was the first lucky loser to reach the final in tournament history.

== Seeds ==
The top four seeds received a bye into the second round.

1. (United States) Taylor Fritz (champion)
2. (United States) Tommy Paul (second round)
3. (Czech Republic) Jakub Menšík (quarterfinals)
4. (France) Ugo Humbert (semifinals)
5. (Italy) Flavio Cobolli (first round)
6. (Spain) Alejandro Davidovich Fokina (semifinals)
7. (France) Giovanni Mpetshi Perricard (withdrew)
8. (Portugal) Nuno Borges (second round)

== Draw ==
=== Key ===
- Q = Qualifier
- WC = Wild card
- LL = Lucky loser
- Alt = Alternate
- ITF = ITF entry
- PR = Protected ranking
- SR = Special ranking
- SE = Special exempt
- JE = Junior exempt
- JR = Junior Accelerator Programme entrant
- CO = College Accelerator Programme entrant
- NG = Next Gen Accelerator Program entrant
- w/o = Walkover
- r = Retired
- d = Defaulted

=== Finals ===
Semifinals
1	(United States) Taylor Fritz	6	3	6
6	(Spain) Alejandro Davidovich Fokina	3	6	1
4	(France) Ugo Humbert	7^{9}	4	4
LL	(United States) Jenson Brooksby	6^{7}	6	6

Final
1	(United States) Taylor Fritz	7	6
LL	(United States) Jenson Brooksby	5	1

=== Top half ===
First round
(Belgium) Z Bergs	7^{10}	0	3
(Brazil) J Fonseca	6^{8}	6	6
(Italy) L Darderi	4	5
(United States) M Giron	6	7
(United Kingdom) J Fearnley	6	6
5	(Italy) F Cobolli	2	2
Q	(United Kingdom) G Loffhagen	6^{6}	6	6^{1}
PR	(United States) R Opelka	7^{8}	3	7^{7}
Q	(Australia) A Vukic	3	7^{7}	1
Q	(Australia) J Duckworth	6	6^{5}	6
LL	(Chinese Taipei) C-h Tseng	6^{6}	2
6	(Spain) A Davidovich Fokina	7^{8}	6

Second round
1	(United States) T Fritz	6	6^{5}	7
(Brazil) J Fonseca	3	7^{7}	5
(United States) M Giron	6	6
(United Kingdom) J Fearnley	3	1
3	(Czech Republic) J Menšík	7	6
PR	(United States) R Opelka	5	3
Q	(Australia) J Duckworth	7^{7}	3	4
6	(Spain) A Davidovich Fokina	6^{3}	6	6

Quarterfinals
1	(United States) T Fritz	7	4	7
(United States) M Giron	5	6	5
3	(Czech Republic) J Menšík	4	5
6	(Spain) A Davidovich Fokina	6	7

Semifinals
1	(United States) T Fritz	6	3	6
6	(Spain) A Davidovich Fokina	3	6	1

=== Bottom half ===
First round
LL	(United Kingdom) B Harris	6	6
WC	(United Kingdom) C Norrie	4	4
Q	(Italy) M Bellucci	6	6
(France) Q Halys	4	2
(Hungary) F Marozsán	2	4
(Italy) L Sonego	6	6
8	(Portugal) N Borges	4	6	6
WC	(United Kingdom) J Pinnington Jones	6	3	3
LL	(United States) J Brooksby	7^{8}	6
(Argentina) F Comesaña	6^{6}	4
WC	(United Kingdom) D Evans	3	6	6
(Serbia) M Kecmanović	6	4	4

Second round
LL	(United Kingdom) B Harris	6	6
Q	(Italy) M Bellucci	3	4
(Italy) L Sonego	5	4
4	(France) U Humbert	7	6
8	(Portugal) N Borges	4	4
LL	(United States) J Brooksby	6	6
WC	(United Kingdom) D Evans	6	3	6
2	(United States) T Paul	4	6	3

Quarterfinals
LL	(United Kingdom) B Harris	6^{4}	1
4	(France) U Humbert	7^{7}	6
LL	(United States) J Brooksby	6	6
WC	(United Kingdom) D Evans	2	3

Semifinals
4	(France) U Humbert	7^{9}	4	4
LL	(United States) J Brooksby	6^{7}	6	6

== Qualifying ==
=== Seeds ===
1. (Italy) Mattia Bellucci (qualified)
2. (Australia) Christopher O'Connell (first round)
3. (Australia) Aleksandar Vukic (qualified)
4. (Italy) Luca Nardi (first round)
5. (Chinese Taipei) Tseng Chun-hsin (qualifying competition, lucky loser)
6. (United States) Mackenzie McDonald (first round)
7. (Australia) James Duckworth (qualified)
8. (Poland) Kamil Majchrzak (first round)

=== Qualifiers ===
1. (Italy) Mattia Bellucci
2. (Australia) James Duckworth
3. (Australia) Aleksandar Vukic
4. (United Kingdom) George Loffhagen

=== Lucky losers ===
1. (Chinese Taipei) Tseng Chun-hsin
2. (United Kingdom) Billy Harris
3. (United States) Jenson Brooksby

=== Qualifying draw ===
==== First qualifier ====
First round
1	(Italy) Mattia Bellucci	7	6
(Czech Republic) Marek Gengel	5	1
(France) Geoffrey Blancaneaux	7	6^{4}	3
5	(Chinese Taipei) Tseng Chun-hsin	5	7^{7}	6

Qualifying competition
1	(Italy) Mattia Bellucci	6	6
5	(Chinese Taipei) Tseng Chun-hsin	2	1

==== Second qualifier ====
First round
2	(Australia) Christopher O'Connell	3	6	4
(United Kingdom) Johannus Monday	6	2	6
WC	(United Kingdom) Henry Searle	3	7	5
7	(Australia) James Duckworth	6	5	7

Qualifying competition
(United Kingdom) Johannus Monday	4	2
7	(Australia) James Duckworth	6	6

==== Third qualifier ====
First round
3	(Australia) Aleksandar Vukic	6	6
(United Kingdom) Jay Clarke	3	2
(United States) Jenson Brooksby	7^{9}	6
8	(Poland) Kamil Majchrzak	6^{7}	3

Qualifying competition
3	(Australia) Aleksandar Vukic	7	6
(United States) Jenson Brooksby	5	3

==== Fourth qualifier ====
First round
4	(Italy) Luca Nardi	3	4
(United Kingdom) Billy Harris	6	6
WC	(United Kingdom) George Loffhagen	6	7^{7}
6	(United States) Mackenzie McDonald	4	6^{1}

Qualifying competition
(United Kingdom) Billy Harris	6^{2}	2
WC	(United Kingdom) George Loffhagen	7^{7}	6
