= 2025 Eastbourne Open – Women's singles =

Women's singles
- 2025 Eastbourne Open

Final
- Champion: (Australia) Maya Joint
- Runner-up: (Philippines) Alexandra Eala
- Score: 6–4, 1–6, 7–6^{(12–10)}

Details
- Draw: 32
- Seeds: 8

Events
Singles	men	women
Doubles	men	women
← 2024 ·	Eastbourne Open	· 2026 →

Maya Joint defeated Alexandra Eala in the final, 6–4, 1–6, 7–6^{(12–10)} to win the women's singles tennis title at the 2025 Eastbourne Open. It was her second WTA Tour singles title, and she saved four championship points in the final-set tiebreak. Joint was the first Australian woman to win the tournament, and the first to reach the final since Wendy Turnbull in 1983.

Eala was the first player from the Philippines to reach a WTA final in the tour's 54-year history, and the first player from Southeast Asia to reach a WTA tour singles final since Tamarine Tanasugarn in 2010.

Daria Kasatkina was the defending champion, but lost in the first round to Lulu Sun.

== Seeds ==
1. (Australia) Daria Kasatkina (first round)
2. (Czech Republic) Barbora Krejčíková (quarterfinals, withdrew)
3. (Latvia) Jeļena Ostapenko (second round, retired)
4. (United States) Sofia Kenin (first round)
5. (Poland) Magda Linette (first round, retired)
6. (United States) Peyton Stearns (second round)
7. (United Kingdom) Emma Raducanu (second round)
8. (Slovakia) Rebecca Šramková (second round)

== Draw ==
=== Key ===
- Q = Qualifier
- WC = Wild card
- LL = Lucky loser
- Alt = Alternate
- ITF = ITF entry
- PR = Protected ranking
- SR = Special ranking
- SE = Special exempt
- JE = Junior exempt
- JR = Junior Accelerator Programme entrant
- CO = College Accelerator Programme entrant
- NG = Next Gen Accelerator Program entrant
- w/o = Walkover
- r = Retired
- d = Defaulted

=== Finals ===
Semifinals
(Australia) Maya Joint	7	6
Anastasia Pavlyuchenkova	5	3
Q	(Philippines) Alexandra Eala	7	2	6
Q	(France) Varvara Gracheva	5	6	3

Final
(Australia) Maya Joint	6	1	7^{12}
Q	(Philippines) Alexandra Eala	4	6	6^{10}

=== Top half ===
First round
1	(Australia) D Kasatkina	5	6	3
(New Zealand) L Sun	7	2	6
A Blinkova	6	2	6
(Czech Republic) M Bouzková	4	6	3
(Australia) M Joint	7	6
(Tunisia) O Jabeur	5	2
(United States) A Li	7^{7}	3	1
7	(United Kingdom) E Raducanu	6^{5}	6	6
4	(United States) S Kenin	4	4
Q	(Australia) K Birrell	6	6
A Pavlyuchenkova	6	6^{5}	7^{9}
(Bulgaria) V Tomova	1	7^{7}	6^{7}
Q	(Italy) E Cocciaretto	4	6	3
Q	K Rakhimova	6	4	6
WC	(United Kingdom) M Xu	3	4
6	(United States) P Stearns	6	6

Second round
(New Zealand) L Sun	3	3
A Blinkova	6	6
(Australia) M Joint	4	6	7^{7}
7	(United Kingdom) E Raducanu	6	1	6^{4}
Q	(Australia) K Birrell	5	5
A Pavlyuchenkova	7	7
Q	K Rakhimova	6	6
6	(United States) P Stearns	3	4

Quarterfinals
A Blinkova	4	5
(Australia) M Joint	6	7
A Pavlyuchenkova	6	2	6
Q	K Rakhimova	2	6	0

Semifinals
(Australia) M Joint	7	6
A Pavlyuchenkova	5	3

=== Bottom half ===
First round
5	(Poland) M Linette	4	2^{r}
SE	(Ukraine) D Yastremska	6	4
WC	(United Kingdom) F Jones	6	7
Q	(Belgium) G Minnen	4	5
(Italy) L Bronzetti	0	1
Q	(Philippines) A Eala	6	6
(United Kingdom) S Kartal	3	6^{2}
3	(Latvia) J Ostapenko	6	7^{7}
8	(Slovakia) R Šramková	6	6
(Romania) J Cristian	3	2
Q	(France) V Gracheva	6	4	7
(Colombia) C Osorio	4	6	5
WC	(United Kingdom) J Burrage	6	6
(Japan) M Uchijima	3	2
WC	(United Kingdom) H Dart	3	7^{7}	5
2	(Czech Republic) B Krejčíková	6	6^{4}	7

Second round
SE	(Ukraine) D Yastremska	6	6
WC	(United Kingdom) F Jones	2	1
Q	(Philippines) A Eala	0	6	3
3	(Latvia) J Ostapenko	6	2	2^{r}
8	(Slovakia) R Šramková	5	3
Q	(France) V Gracheva	7	6
WC	(United Kingdom) J Burrage	4	6	6^{3}
2	(Czech Republic) B Krejčíková	6	4	7^{7}

Quarterfinals
SE	(Ukraine) D Yastremska	1	2
Q	(Philippines) A Eala	6	6
Q	(France) V Gracheva	w/o
2	(Czech Republic) B Krejčíková

Semifinals
Q	(Philippines) A Eala	7	2	6
Q	(France) V Gracheva	5	6	3

== Qualifying ==
=== Seeds ===
1. (United States) Hailey Baptiste (qualifying competition)
2. (Spain) Jéssica Bouzas Maneiro (first round)
3. (United States) Caroline Dolehide (first round)
4. (Hungary) Anna Bondár (qualifying competition)
5. (Netherlands) Suzan Lamens (qualifying competition)
6. (Belgium) Greet Minnen (qualified)
7. (Mexico) Renata Zarazúa (qualifying competition)
8. (Philippines) Alexandra Eala (qualified)
9. (United States) Bernarda Pera (first round)
10. (Australia) Kimberly Birrell (qualified)
11. (Switzerland) Viktorija Golubic (qualifying competition)
12. (Colombia) Emiliana Arango (first round)

=== Qualifiers ===
1. (Philippines) Alexandra Eala
2. Kamilla Rakhimova
3. (France) Varvara Gracheva
4. (Australia) Kimberly Birrell
5. (Italy) Elisabetta Cocciaretto
6. (Belgium) Greet Minnen

=== Qualifying draw ===
==== First qualifier ====
First round
1	(United States) Hailey Baptiste	7	6
(China) Yuan Yue	5	3
(Turkey) Zeynep Sönmez	1	3
8	(Philippines) Alexandra Eala	6	6

Qualifying competition
1	(United States) Hailey Baptiste	7^{7}	6^{4}	1
8	(Philippines) Alexandra Eala	6^{1}	7^{7}	6

==== Second qualifier ====
First round
2	(Spain) Jéssica Bouzas Maneiro	1	7	4
WC	(United Kingdom) Heather Watson	6	5	6
Kamilla Rakhimova	6^{4}	7^{7}	6
9	(United States) Bernarda Pera	7^{7}	6^{3}	3

Qualifying competition
WC	(United Kingdom) Heather Watson	4	1
Kamilla Rakhimova	6	6

==== Third qualifier ====
First round
3	(United States) Caroline Dolehide	3	6	4
(France) Varvara Gracheva	6	3	6
(Egypt) Mayar Sherif	3	5
11	(Switzerland) Viktorija Golubic	6	7

Qualifying competition
(France) Varvara Gracheva	2	7^{7}	6
11	(Switzerland) Viktorija Golubic	6	6^{3}	4

==== Fourth qualifier ====
First round
4	(Hungary) Anna Bondár	6	6
WC	(United Kingdom) Megan Knight	4	2
(United States) Katie Volynets	5	5
10	(Australia) Kimberly Birrell	7	7

Qualifying competition
4	(Hungary) Anna Bondár	2	3
10	(Australia) Kimberly Birrell	6	6

==== Fifth qualifier ====
First round
5	(Netherlands) Suzan Lamens	6	6
WC	(United Kingdom) Hannah Klugman	4	2
(Italy) Elisabetta Cocciaretto	6	7
12	(Colombia) Emiliana Arango	2	5

Qualifying competition
5	(Netherlands) Suzan Lamens	6	1	6^{2}
(Italy) Elisabetta Cocciaretto	4	6	7^{7}

==== Sixth qualifier ====
First round
6	(Belgium) Greet Minnen	6^{4}	6	7^{11}
(Romania) Anca Todoni	7^{7}	1	6^{9}
WC	(United Kingdom) Mika Stojsavljevic	3	4
7	(Mexico) Renata Zarazúa	6	6

Qualifying competition
6	(Belgium) Greet Minnen	2	6	6
7	(Mexico) Renata Zarazúa	6	3	4
