= 2025 Eastbourne Open – Men's doubles =

Men's doubles
- 2025 Eastbourne Open

Final
- Champions: (United Kingdom) Julian Cash (United Kingdom) Lloyd Glasspool
- Runners-up: (Uruguay) Ariel Behar (Belgium) Joran Vliegen
- Score: 6–4, 7–6^{(7–5)}

Details
- Draw: 16
- Seeds: 4

Events
| Singles | men | women |
| Doubles | men | women |
| ← 2024 · | Eastbourne Open | · 2026 → |

Julian Cash and Lloyd Glasspool defeated Ariel Behar and Joran Vliegen in the final, 6–4, 7–6^{(7–5)} to win the doubles tennis title at the 2025 Eastbourne Open. They became just the third all-British pairing to win the title and the first since 2018.

Neal Skupski and Michael Venus were the defending champions, but Venus did not participate this year. Skupski partnered Joe Salisbury, but lost in the semifinals to Cash and Glasspool.

== Seeds ==
1. (Finland) Harri Heliövaara / (United Kingdom) Henry Patten (semifinals)
2. (United Kingdom) Joe Salisbury / (United Kingdom) Neal Skupski (semifinals)
3. (United Kingdom) Julian Cash / (United Kingdom) Lloyd Glasspool (champions)
4. (United States) Christian Harrison / (United States) Evan King (first round)

== Draw ==
=== Key ===
- Q = Qualifier
- WC = Wild card
- LL = Lucky loser
- Alt = Alternate
- ITF = ITF entry
- PR = Protected ranking
- SR = Special ranking
- SE = Special exempt
- JE = Junior exempt
- JR = Junior Accelerator Programme entrant
- CO = College Accelerator Programme entrant
- NG = Next Gen Accelerator Program entrant
- w/o = Walkover
- r = Retired
- d = Defaulted

=== Draw ===
First round
1 | (Finland) H Heliövaara (United Kingdom) H Patten | 6 | 6
(Brazil) F Romboli (Australia) J-P Smith | 3 | 3
(United States) N Lammons (United States) J Withrow | 5 | 7^{7} | [5]
(Argentina) F Comesaña (Italy) L Darderi | 7 | 6^{5} | [10]
4 | (United States) C Harrison (United States) E King | 6^{2} | 4
(Czech Republic) A Pavlásek (Poland) J Zieliński | 7^{7} | 6
(Uruguay) A Behar (Belgium) J Vliegen | 6 | 6
(Portugal) N Borges (United States) M Giron | 2 | 4
WC | (United Kingdom) D Stevenson (United Kingdom) M Willis | 6^{3} | 7^{9} | [8]
(United Kingdom) J Murray (United States) R Ram | 7^{7} | 6^{7} | [10]
WC | (United Kingdom) C Broom (United Kingdom) J Paris | 6^{3} | 3
3 | (United Kingdom) J Cash (United Kingdom) L Glasspool | 7^{7} | 6
(Monaco) H Nys (France) É Roger-Vasselin | 6 | 6
(Australia) M Ebden (France) A Olivetti | 3 | 2
(Sweden) A Göransson (Netherlands) S Verbeek | 3 | 4
2 | (United Kingdom) J Salisbury (United Kingdom) N Skupski | 6 | 6

Quarterfinals
1 | (Finland) H Heliövaara (United Kingdom) H Patten | 7^{7} | 6
(Argentina) F Comesaña (Italy) L Darderi | 6^{3} | 3
(Czech Republic) A Pavlásek (Poland) J Zieliński | 6 | 1 | [5]
(Uruguay) A Behar (Belgium) J Vliegen | 3 | 6 | [10]
(United Kingdom) J Murray (United States) R Ram | 3 | 4
3 | (United Kingdom) J Cash (United Kingdom) L Glasspool | 6 | 6
(Monaco) H Nys (France) É Roger-Vasselin | 6^{4} | 5
2 | (United Kingdom) J Salisbury (United Kingdom) N Skupski | 7^{7} | 7

Semifinals
1 | (Finland) H Heliövaara (United Kingdom) H Patten | 4 | 3
(Uruguay) A Behar (Belgium) J Vliegen | 6 | 6
3 | (United Kingdom) J Cash (United Kingdom) L Glasspool | 6^{4} | 6 | [10]
2 | (United Kingdom) J Salisbury (United Kingdom) N Skupski | 7^{7} | 4 | [8]

Final
(Uruguay) A Behar (Belgium) J Vliegen | 4 | 6^{5}
3 | (United Kingdom) J Cash (United Kingdom) L Glasspool | 6 | 7^{7}
