= 2025 Eastbourne Open – Women's doubles =

Women's doubles
- 2025 Eastbourne Open

Final
- Champions: (Czech Republic) Marie Bouzková (Kazakhstan) Anna Danilina
- Runners-up: (Chinese Taipei) Hsieh Su-wei (Australia) Maya Joint
- Score: 6–4, 7–5

Details
- Draw: 16
- Seeds: 4

Events
Singles	men	women
Doubles	men	women
← 2024 ·	Eastbourne International	· 2026 →

Marie Bouzková and Anna Danilina defeated Hsieh Su-wei and Maya Joint in the final, 6–4, 7–5 to win the doubles tennis title at the 2025 Eastbourne Open.

Lyudmyla Kichenok and Jeļena Ostapenko were the reigning champions, but Kichenok chose to compete in Bad Homburg instead. Ostapenko partnered Barbora Krejčíková, but they withdrew from their quarterfinal match.

== Seeds ==
1. (United States) Caroline Dolehide / (United States) Desirae Krawczyk (first round)
2. (Japan) Eri Hozumi / (Indonesia) Aldila Sutjiadi (quarterfinals)
3. (Spain) Cristina Bucșa / (Japan) Miyu Kato (first round)
4. (Czech Republic) Barbora Krejčíková / (Latvia) Jeļena Ostapenko (quarterfinals, withdrew)

== Draw ==
=== Key ===
- Q = Qualifier
- WC = Wild card
- LL = Lucky loser
- Alt = Alternate
- ITF = ITF entry
- PR = Protected ranking
- SR = Special ranking
- SE = Special exempt
- JE = Junior exempt
- JR = Junior Accelerator Programme entrant
- CO = College Accelerator Programme entrant
- NG = Next Gen Accelerator Program entrant
- w/o = Walkover
- r = Retired
- d = Defaulted

=== Draw ===
First round
1	(United States) C Dolehide (United States) D Krawczyk	5	5
(Mexico) G Olmos (Mexico) R Zarazúa	7	7
WC	(United Kingdom) H Watson (United Kingdom) M Xu	6^{8}	3
(Belgium) M Kempen (China) Q Tang	7^{10}	6
4	(Czech Republic) B Krejčíková (Latvia) J Ostapenko	6	6
(United States) Q Gleason (Georgia (country)) O Kalashnikova	4	3
(Japan) S Aoyama (Poland) K Piter	3	3
(Chinese Taipei) S-w Hsieh (Australia) M Joint	6	6
(United States) H Baptiste (United States) P Stearns	3	6	[6]
WC	(United Kingdom) J Burrage (United Kingdom) S Kartal	6	3	[10]
(Czech Republic) M Bouzková (Kazakhstan) A Danilina	7	7^{7}
3	(Spain) C Bucșa (Japan) M Kato	5	6^{4}
(Italy) A Moratelli (United States) S Santamaria	3	2
(United Kingdom) H Dart (United Kingdom) M Lumsden	6	6
K Rakhimova (Czech Republic) A Sisková	5	6	[8]
2	(Japan) E Hozumi (Indonesia) A Sutjiadi	7	3	[10]

Quarterfinals
(Mexico) G Olmos (Mexico) R Zarazúa	7^{7}	6
(Belgium) M Kempen (China) Q Tang	6^{5}	4
4	(Czech Republic) B Krejčíková (Latvia) J Ostapenko
(Chinese Taipei) S-w Hsieh (Australia) M Joint	w/o
WC	(United Kingdom) J Burrage (United Kingdom) S Kartal	4	6^{1}
(Czech Republic) M Bouzková (Kazakhstan) A Danilina	6	7^{7}
(United Kingdom) H Dart (United Kingdom) M Lumsden	6	6
2	(Japan) E Hozumi (Indonesia) A Sutjiadi	1	4

Semifinals
(Mexico) G Olmos (Mexico) R Zarazúa	5	2
(Chinese Taipei) S-w Hsieh (Australia) M Joint	7	6
(Czech Republic) M Bouzková (Kazakhstan) A Danilina	2	7	[11]
(United Kingdom) H Dart (United Kingdom) M Lumsden	6	5	[9]

Final
(Chinese Taipei) S-w Hsieh (Australia) M Joint	4	5
(Czech Republic) M Bouzková (Kazakhstan) A Danilina	6	7
