= 2024 Eastbourne International – Men's doubles =

Men's doubles
- 2024 Eastbourne International

Final
- Champions: (United Kingdom) Neal Skupski (New Zealand) Michael Venus
- Runners-up: (Australia) Matthew Ebden (Australia) John Peers
- Score: 4–6, 7–6^{(7–2)}, [11–9]

Details
- Draw: 16
- Seeds: 4

Events
Singles	men	women
Doubles	men	women
← 2023 ·	Eastbourne International	· 2025 →

Neal Skupski and Michael Venus defeated Matthew Ebden and John Peers in the final, 4–6, 7–6^{(7–2)}, [11–9] to win the men's doubles tennis title at the 2024 Eastbourne International.

Nikola Mektić and Mate Pavić were the three-time reigning champions, but Mektić chose not to compete this year. Pavić partnered Marcelo Arévalo, but lost in the semifinals to Skupski and Venus.

Ebden retained the doubles no. 1 ranking after winning his first-round match. Marcel Granollers and Horacio Zeballos would otherwise have regained the top ranking, despite not competing that week.

== Seeds ==
1. (United States) Rajeev Ram / (United Kingdom) Joe Salisbury (first round, retired)
2. (El Salvador) Marcelo Arévalo / (Croatia) Mate Pavić (semifinals)
3. (Australia) Matthew Ebden / (Australia) John Peers (final)
4. (United Kingdom) Neal Skupski / (New Zealand) Michael Venus (champions)

== Draw ==
=== Key ===
- Q = Qualifier
- WC = Wild card
- LL = Lucky loser
- Alt = Alternate
- ITF = ITF entry
- PR = Protected ranking
- SR = Special ranking
- SE = Special exempt
- JE = Junior exempt
- JR = Junior Accelerator Programme entrant
- CO = College Accelerator Programme entrant
- NG = Next Gen Accelerator Program entrant
- w/o = Walkover
- r = Retired
- d = Defaulted

=== Draw ===
First round
1	(United States) R Ram (United Kingdom) J Salisbury	7^{7}	2^{r}
(Australia) M Purcell (Finland) E Ruusuvuori	6^{3}	2
Alt	(Argentina) G Andreozzi (New Zealand) M Daniell	3	1
(Finland) H Heliövaara (United Kingdom) H Patten	6	6
3	(Australia) M Ebden (Australia) J Peers	6	6
(France) N Mahut (Tunisia) S Mansouri	1	4
WC	(United Kingdom) L Broady (United Kingdom) B Harris	4	4
(United States) A Krajicek (United States) M McDonald	6	6
(Romania) VV Cornea (Kazakhstan) A Nedovyesov	3	6^{2}
(Argentina) S Báez (Argentina) M Navone	6	7^{7}
(Brazil) R Matos (Brazil) M Melo	6^{3}	4
4	(United Kingdom) N Skupski (New Zealand) M Venus	7^{7}	6
(United Kingdom) L Glasspool (Netherlands) J-J Rojer	7^{7}	4	[17]
(Monaco) H Nys (Poland) J Zieliński	6^{3}	6	[15]
(Argentina) F Cerúdolo (Argentina) TM Etcheverry	2	2
2	(El Salvador) M Arévalo (Croatia) M Pavić	6	6

Quarterfinals
(Australia) M Purcell (Finland) E Ruusuvuori	3	4
(Finland) H Heliövaara (United Kingdom) H Patten	6	6
3	(Australia) M Ebden (Australia) J Peers	6	6^{3}	[10]
(United States) A Krajicek (United States) M McDonald	3	7^{7}	[5]
(Argentina) S Báez (Argentina) M Navone	3	4
4	(United Kingdom) N Skupski (New Zealand) M Venus	6	6
(United Kingdom) L Glasspool (Netherlands) J-J Rojer	6	4	[6]
2	(El Salvador) M Arévalo (Croatia) M Pavić	0	6	[10]

Semifinals
(Finland) H Heliövaara (United Kingdom) H Patten	7^{13}	6^{4}	[5]
3	(Australia) M Ebden (Australia) J Peers	6^{11}	7^{7}	[10]
4	(United Kingdom) N Skupski (New Zealand) M Venus	6^{5}	6	[10]
2	(El Salvador) M Arévalo (Croatia) M Pavić	7^{7}	2	[8]

Final
3	(Australia) M Ebden (Australia) J Peers	6	6^{2}	[9]
4	(United Kingdom) N Skupski (New Zealand) M Venus	4	7^{7}	[11]
