= 2026 Eastbourne Open – Men's doubles =

Men's doubles
- 2026 Eastbourne Open

Final
- Champions: (Monaco) Hugo Nys (France) Édouard Roger-Vasselin
- Runners-up: (Argentina) Guido Andreozzi (France) Manuel Guinard
- Score: 6–3, 4–6, [10–8]

Details
- Draw: 16
- Seeds: 4

Events
Singles	men	women
Doubles	men	women
- Eastbourne Open

Hugo Nys and Édouard Roger-Vasselin defeated Guido Andreozzi and Manuel Guinard in the final, 6–3, 4–6, [10–8] to win the men's doubles tennis title at the 2026 Eastbourne Open.

Julian Cash and Lloyd Glasspool were the defending champions, but lost in the first round to Juan Manuel Cerúndolo and Camilo Ugo Carabelli.

== Seeds ==
1. (United Kingdom) Julian Cash / (United Kingdom) Lloyd Glasspool (first round)
2. (United States) Christian Harrison / (United Kingdom) Neal Skupski (semifinals)
3. (Argentina) Guido Andreozzi / (France) Manuel Guinard (final)
4. (Monaco) Hugo Nys / (France) Édouard Roger-Vasselin (champions)

== Draw ==
Key

- Q = Qualifier
- WC = Wild card
- LL = Lucky loser
- Alt = Alternate
- ITF = ITF entry
- PR = Protected ranking
- SR = Special ranking
- SE = Special exempt
- JE = Junior exempt
- JR = Junior Accelerator Programme entrant
- CO = College Accelerator Programme entrant
- NG = Next Gen Accelerator Program entrant
- w/o = Walkover
- r = Retired
- d = Defaulted

=== Draw ===
First round
1	(United Kingdom) J Cash (United Kingdom) L Glasspool	4	6^{5}
(Argentina) JM Cerúndolo (Argentina) C Ugo Carabelli	6	7^{7}
(United Kingdom) L Johnson (Poland) J Zieliński	6^{6}	6	[10]
WC	(United Kingdom) B Jones (United Kingdom) J Paris	7^{8}	3	[5]
4	(Monaco) H Nys (France) É Roger-Vasselin	6	7
(Germany) H Jebens (Czech Republic) M Vocel	3	5
(United States) R Ram (United Kingdom) J Salisbury	6	6
(France) T Atmane (France) L Sanchez	1	3
(India) Y Bhambri (New Zealand) M Venus	6	6
(Argentina) TM Etcheverry (Argentina) TA Tirante	3	4
(Chinese Taipei) R Ho (Austria) N Oberleitner	7^{7}	6^{4}	[8]
3	(Argentina) G Andreozzi (France) M Guinard	6^{4}	7^{7}	[10]
WC	(United Kingdom) D Stevenson (United Kingdom) M Willis	7^{7}	3	[13]
(Brazil) O Luz (Brazil) R Matos	6^{1}	6	[11]
(France) S Doumbia (France) A Reymond	5	3
2	(United States) C Harrison (United Kingdom) N Skupski	7	6

Quarterfinals
(Argentina) JM Cerúndolo (Argentina) C Ugo Carabelli
(United Kingdom) L Johnson (Poland) J Zieliński	w/o
4	(Monaco) H Nys (France) É Roger-Vasselin	w/o
(United States) R Ram (United Kingdom) J Salisbury
(India) Y Bhambri (New Zealand) M Venus	4	6^{3}
3	(Argentina) G Andreozzi (France) M Guinard	6	7^{7}
WC	(United Kingdom) D Stevenson (United Kingdom) M Willis	3	6^{4}
2	(United States) C Harrison (United Kingdom) N Skupski	6	7^{7}

Semifinals
(United Kingdom) L Johnson (Poland) J Zieliński	4	2
4	(Monaco) H Nys (France) É Roger-Vasselin	6	6
3	(Argentina) G Andreozzi (France) M Guinard	6	6^{6}	[12]
2	(United States) C Harrison (United Kingdom) N Skupski	4	7^{8}	[10]

Final
4	(Monaco) H Nys (France) É Roger-Vasselin	6	4	[10]
3	(Argentina) G Andreozzi (France) M Guinard	3	6	[8]
