= 2025 Eastbourne Open =

- Date: 23–28 June
- Edition: 14th (men); 50th (women)
- Category: ATP 250 (men); WTA 250 (women)
- Draw: 28S / 16D (men); 32S / 16D (women)
- Surface: Grass
- Location: Eastbourne, United Kingdom
- Venue: Devonshire Park LTC

Champions

Men's singles
- (United States) Taylor Fritz

Women's singles
- (Australia) Maya Joint

Men's doubles
- (United Kingdom) Julian Cash / (United Kingdom) Lloyd Glasspool

Women's doubles
- (Czech Republic) Marie Bouzková / (Kazakhstan) Anna Danilina
- Eastbourne International

The 2025 Eastbourne Open, known as the Lexus Eastbourne Open (for sponsorship reasons) was a combined men's and women's tennis tournament played on outdoor grass courts. It was the 50th edition of the event for the women and the 14th edition for the men. The tournament was classified as a WTA 250 tournament on the 2025 WTA Tour (downgraded from WTA 500 status in previous years), and as an ATP 250 tournament on the 2025 ATP Tour. The tournament took place at the Devonshire Park Lawn Tennis Club in Eastbourne, United Kingdom between 23 and 28 June 2025.

== Champions ==
=== Men's singles ===
- (United States) Taylor Fritz def. (United States) Jenson Brooksby, 7–5, 6–1

=== Women's singles ===
- (Australia) Maya Joint def. (Philippines) Alexandra Eala, 6–4, 1–6, 7–6^{(12–10)}

=== Men's doubles ===
- (United Kingdom) Julian Cash / (United Kingdom) Lloyd Glasspool def. (Uruguay) Ariel Behar / (Belgium) Joran Vliegen, 6–4, 7–6^{(7–5)}

=== Women's doubles ===
- (Czech Republic) Marie Bouzková / (Kazakhstan) Anna Danilina def. (Chinese Taipei) Hsieh Su-wei / (Australia) Maya Joint, 6–4, 7–5

== ATP singles main draw entrants ==
=== Seeds ===
Country	Player	Rank^{1}	Seed
USA	Taylor Fritz	4	1
USA	Tommy Paul	8	2
CZE	Jakub Menšík	17	3
FRA	Ugo Humbert	20	4
ITA	Flavio Cobolli	24	5
ESP	Alejandro Davidovich Fokina	28	6
~~FRA~~	~~Giovanni Mpetshi Perricard~~	~~36~~	~~7~~
POR	Nuno Borges	38	8

- ^{1} Rankings are as of 16 June 2025.

=== Other entrants ===
The following players received wildcards into the main draw:

- (United Kingdom) Dan Evans
- (United Kingdom) Cameron Norrie
- (United Kingdom) Jack Pinnington Jones

The following player received entry using a protected ranking:

- (United States) Reilly Opelka

The following players received entry from the qualifying draw:

- (Italy) Mattia Bellucci
- (Australia) James Duckworth
- (United Kingdom) George Loffhagen
- (Australia) Aleksandar Vukic

The following players received entry as lucky losers:

- (United States) Jenson Brooksby
- (United Kingdom) Billy Harris
- (Chinese Taipei) Tseng Chun-hsin

=== Withdrawals ===
- (Italy) Matteo Arnaldi → replaced by (Chinese Taipei) Tseng Chun-hsin
- (Kazakhstan) Alexander Bublik → replaced by (United States) Jenson Brooksby
- (Argentina) Francisco Cerúndolo → replaced by (Hungary) Fábián Marozsán
- (Czech Republic) Jiří Lehečka → replaced by (Argentina) Francisco Comesaña
- (United States) Brandon Nakashima → replaced by (United Kingdom) Jacob Fearnley
- (France) Giovanni Mpetshi Perricard → replaced by (United Kingdom) Billy Harris

== ATP doubles main draw entrants ==
=== Seeds ===
Country	Player	Country	Player	Rank^{1}	Seed
FIN	Harri Heliövaara	GBR	Henry Patten	7	1
GBR	Joe Salisbury	GBR	Neal Skupski	26	2
GBR	Julian Cash	GBR	Lloyd Glasspool	27	3
USA	Christian Harrison	USA	Evan King	39	4

- ^{1} Rankings are as of 16 June 2025.

=== Other entrants ===
The following pairs received wildcards into the doubles main draw:

- (United Kingdom) Charles Broom / (United Kingdom) Joshua Paris
- (United Kingdom) David Stevenson / (United Kingdom) Marcus Willis

=== Withdrawals ===
- (Netherlands) Sander Arends / (United Kingdom) Luke Johnson → replaced by (Uruguay) Ariel Behar / (Belgium) Joran Vliegen
- (Australia) Matthew Ebden / (New Zealand) Michael Venus → replaced by (Australia) Matthew Ebden / (France) Albano Olivetti

== WTA singles main draw entrants ==
=== Seeds ===
Country	Player	Rank^{1}	Seed
AUS	Daria Kasatkina	16	1
CZE	Barbora Krejčíková	17	2
LAT	Jeļena Ostapenko	19	3
USA	Sofia Kenin	29	4
POL	Magda Linette	31	5
USA	Peyton Stearns	34	6
GBR	Emma Raducanu	36	7
SVK	Rebecca Šramková	38	8

- ^{1} Rankings are as of 16 June 2025.

=== Other entrants ===
The following players received wildcards into the main draw:

- (United Kingdom) Jodie Burrage
- (United Kingdom) Harriet Dart
- (United Kingdom) Francesca Jones
- (United Kingdom) Mingge Xu

The following player received entry as a special exempt:

- (Ukraine) Dayana Yastremska

The following players received entry from the qualifying draw:

- (Australia) Kimberly Birrell
- (Italy) Elisabetta Cocciaretto
- (Philippines) Alexandra Eala
- (France) Varvara Gracheva
- (Belgium) Greet Minnen
- Kamilla Rakhimova

=== Withdrawals ===
- (Armenia) Elina Avanesyan → replaced by (Japan) Moyuka Uchijima
- Polina Kudermetova → replaced by Anna Blinkova
- Anastasia Potapova → replaced by (Romania) Jaqueline Cristian

== WTA doubles main draw entrants ==
=== Seeds ===
Country	Player	Country	Player	Rank^{1}	Seed
USA	Caroline Dolehide	USA	Desirae Krawczyk	54	1
JPN	Eri Hozumi	INA	Aldila Sutjiadi	77	2
ESP	Cristina Bucșa	JPN	Miyu Kato	77	3
CZE	Barbora Krejčiková	LAT	Jeļena Ostapenko	86	4

- ^{1} Rankings are as of 16 June 2025.

=== Other entrants ===
The following pairs received wildcards into the doubles main draw:

- (United Kingdom) Jodie Burrage / (United Kingdom) Sonay Kartal
- (United Kingdom) Heather Watson / (United Kingdom) Mingge Xu
