= 2026 Eastbourne Open – Men's singles =

Men's singles
- 2026 Eastbourne Open

Final
- Champion: (Belgium) Zizou Bergs
- Runner-up: (France) Ugo Humbert
- Score: 3–6, 6–1, 6–4

Details
- Draw: 28
- Seeds: 8

Events
Singles	men	women
Doubles	men	women
- Eastbourne Open

Zizou Bergs defeated Ugo Humbert in the final, 3–6, 6–1, 6–4 to win the men's singles tennis title at the 2026 Eastbourne Open. It was his first ATP Tour title. Bergs became the first Belgian player to win an ATP Tour title on grass.

Taylor Fritz was the two-time reigning champion, but withdrew before the tournament due to fatigue.

Jan Choinski became the first British qualifier to reach the men's singles quarterfinals in tournament history. It was also the first time two British players reached the semifinals of the tournament.

== Seeds ==
The top four seeds received a bye into the second round.

1. (United States) Taylor Fritz (withdrew)
2. (Brazil) João Fonseca (withdrew)
3. (Argentina) Francisco Cerúndolo (withdrew)
4. (Argentina) Tomás Martín Etcheverry (second round)
5. (United States) Brandon Nakashima (withdrew)
6. (France) Ugo Humbert (final)
7. (Spain) Jaume Munar (first round)
8. (Argentina) Juan Manuel Cerúndolo (quarterfinals)

== Draw ==
Key

- Q = Qualifier
- WC = Wild card
- LL = Lucky loser
- Alt = Alternate
- ITF = ITF entry
- PR = Protected ranking
- SR = Special ranking
- SE = Special exempt
- JE = Junior exempt
- JR = Junior Accelerator Programme entrant
- CO = College Accelerator Programme entrant
- NG = Next Gen Accelerator Program entrant
- w/o = Walkover
- r = Retired
- d = Defaulted

=== Finals ===
Semifinals
(Belgium) Zizou Bergs	4	7^{7}	6
LL	(United Kingdom) Toby Samuel	6	6^{5}	2
(United Kingdom) Jack Draper	5	3
6	(France) Ugo Humbert	7	6

Final
(Belgium) Zizou Bergs	3	6	6
6	(France) Ugo Humbert	6	1	4

=== Top half ===
First round
Q	(United Kingdom) J Choinski	1	6	6
(Australia) A Popyrin	6	2	2
(Germany) D Altmaier	6	7^{7}
(United States) A Kovacevic	4	6^{4}
(Belgium) Z Bergs	6	6
7	(Spain) J Munar	2	4
(Argentina) TA Tirante	7	6
LL	(United Kingdom) H Stewart	5	2
(Argentina) RA Burruchaga	2	6	5
WC	(United Kingdom) A Fery	6	4	7
(Belgium) R Collignon	4	6	6^{5}
8	(Argentina) JM Cerúndolo	6	4	7^{7}

Second round
LL	(United Kingdom) F Gill	4	7^{7}	2
Q	(United Kingdom) J Choinski	6	6^{4}	6
(Germany) D Altmaier	3	2^{r}
(Belgium) Z Bergs	6	3
LL	(United Kingdom) T Samuel	6	7^{9}
(Argentina) TA Tirante	1	6^{7}
WC	(United Kingdom) A Fery	2	6^{2}
8	(Argentina) JM Cerúndolo	6	7^{7}

Quarterfinals
Q	(United Kingdom) J Choinski	3	3
(Belgium) Z Bergs	6	6
LL	(United Kingdom) T Samuel	6	6
8	(Argentina) JM Cerúndolo	3	4

Semifinals
(Belgium) Z Bergs	4	7^{7}	6
LL	(United Kingdom) T Samuel	6	6^{5}	2

=== Bottom half ===
First round
LL	(United States) M Giron	4	6^{5}
(United Kingdom) J Draper	6	7^{7}
WC	(United Kingdom) J Pinnington Jones	5	6	7
LL	(Argentina) M Trungelliti	7	3	5
(Canada) G Diallo	6^{7}	6	7
(France) T Atmane	7^{9}	4	5
6	(France) U Humbert	7^{7}	6^{1}	6
(Italy) M Bellucci	6^{5}	7^{7}	4
(United States) J Brooksby	7	6
Q	(Australia) A Vukic	5	1
Q	(Italy) M Arnaldi	4	2
Q	(United Kingdom) G Hussey	6	6

Second round
(United Kingdom) J Draper	7	6
WC	(United Kingdom) J Pinnington Jones	5	4
(Canada) G Diallo	6^{11}	6	6
4	(Argentina) TM Etcheverry	7^{13}	3	2
6	(France) U Humbert	6	6
(United States) J Brooksby	3	2
Q	(United Kingdom) G Hussey	1	5
LL	(France) Q Halys	6	7

Quarterfinals
(United Kingdom) J Draper	6	6
(Canada) G Diallo	1	4
6	(France) U Humbert	6	6
LL	(France) Q Halys	3	4

Semifinals
(United Kingdom) J Draper	5	3
6	(France) U Humbert	7	6

== Qualifying ==
=== Seeds ===
1. (Italy) Matteo Arnaldi (qualified)
2. (Australia) James Duckworth (first round)
3. (United States) Emilio Nava (first round)
4. (United States) Marcos Giron (qualifying competition, lucky loser)
5. (Argentina) Marco Trungelliti (qualifying competition, lucky loser)
6. (France) Quentin Halys (first round, lucky loser)
7. (Australia) Aleksandar Vukic (qualified)
8. (China) Wu Yibing (first round)

=== Qualifiers ===
1. (Italy) Matteo Arnaldi
2. (United Kingdom) Giles Hussey
3. (Australia) Aleksandar Vukic
4. (United Kingdom) Jan Choinski

=== Lucky losers ===
1. (United States) Marcos Giron
2. (United Kingdom) Toby Samuel
3. (Argentina) Marco Trungelliti
4. (United Kingdom) Hamish Stewart
5. (France) Quentin Halys
6. (United Kingdom) Felix Gill

=== Qualifying draw ===
==== First qualifier ====
First round
1	(Italy) Matteo Arnaldi	7^{7}	7^{7}
(United Kingdom) Alastair Gray	6^{3}	6^{4}
(United Kingdom) Toby Samuel	6	6
6	(France) Quentin Halys	2	4

Qualifying competition
1	(Italy) Matteo Arnaldi	3	6	6
(United Kingdom) Toby Samuel	6	4	4

==== Second qualifier ====
First round
2	(Australia) James Duckworth	4	4
WC	(United Kingdom) Giles Hussey	6	6
(United Kingdom) Felix Gill	3	6^{7}
5	(Argentina) Marco Trungelliti	6	7^{9}

Qualifying competition
WC	(United Kingdom) Giles Hussey	6	7
5	(Argentina) Marco Trungelliti	4	5

==== Third qualifier ====
First round
3	(United States) Emilio Nava	6	3	3
WC	(United Kingdom) Hamish Stewart	2	6	6
(United Kingdom) Harry Wendelken	5	3
7	(Australia) Aleksandar Vukic	7	6

Qualifying competition
WC	(United Kingdom) Hamish Stewart	6^{5}	6	4
7	(Australia) Aleksandar Vukic	7^{7}	4	6

==== Fourth qualifier ====
First round
4	(United States) Marcos Giron	3	7^{7}	6
(United Kingdom) Charles Broom	6	6^{3}	2
(United Kingdom) Jan Choinski	7^{7}	6
8	(China) Wu Yibing	6^{5}	4

Qualifying competition
4	(United States) Marcos Giron	5	7^{7}	6^{5}
(United Kingdom) Jan Choinski	7	6^{2}	7^{7}
