= 2026 Eastbourne Open – Women's singles =

Women's singles
- 2026 Eastbourne Open

Final
- Champion: (United States) Madison Keys
- Runner-up: (Germany) Tatjana Maria
- Score: 7–5, 6–4

Details
- Draw: 32
- Seeds: 8

Events
Singles	men	women
Doubles	men	women
- Eastbourne Open

Madison Keys defeated Tatjana Maria in the final, 7–5, 6–4 to win the women's singles tennis title at the 2026 Eastbourne Open. She did not lose a set en route to her eleventh career WTA Tour title and her first since the 2025 Australian Open. This was also Keys's third Eastbourne title, following triumphs in 2014 and 2023.

Maya Joint was the defending champion, but lost in the first round to Emiliana Arango.

== Seeds ==
1. (Italy) Jasmine Paolini (first round)
2. (United States) Madison Keys (champion)
3. (Latvia) Jeļena Ostapenko (semifinals, retired)
4. (Czech Republic) Barbora Krejčiková (first round)
5. (Germany) Laura Siegemund (first round)
6. (Indonesia) Janice Tjen (first round)
7. (United States) McCartney Kessler (quarterfinals)
8. (Italy) Elisabetta Cocciaretto (first round)

== Draw ==
Key

- Q = Qualifier
- WC = Wild card
- LL = Lucky loser
- Alt = Alternate
- ITF = ITF entry
- PR = Protected ranking
- SR = Special ranking
- SE = Special exempt
- JE = Junior exempt
- JR = Junior Accelerator Programme entrant
- CO = College Accelerator Programme entrant
- NG = Next Gen Accelerator Program entrant
- w/o = Walkover
- r = Retired
- d = Defaulted

=== Finals ===
Semifinals
(Germany) Tatjana Maria	6	1
3	(Latvia) Jeļena Ostapenko	1	2^{r}
LL	(Croatia) Petra Marčinko	1	0^{r}
2	(United States) Madison Keys	6	0

Final
(Germany) Tatjana Maria	5	4
2	(United States) Madison Keys	7	6

=== Top half ===
First round
1	(Italy) J Paolini	4	3
(Germany) T Maria	6	6
(Ukraine) Y Starodubtseva	4	6	3
Q	A Zakharova	6	3	6
WC	(United Kingdom) H Klugman	5	7	5
(Czech Republic) T Valentová	7	5	7
Q	(Australia) A Tomljanović	6	6^{5}	7
8	(Italy) E Cocciaretto	2	7^{7}	5
3	(Latvia) J Ostapenko	6	6
WC	(United Kingdom) F Jones	2	2
(Hungary) P Udvardy	7^{7}	3
(Hungary) A Bondár	6^{4}	2^{r}
Q	(Turkey) Z Sönmez	4	6	7
WC	(United Kingdom) H Dart	6	2	5
(Czech Republic) S Bejlek	3	7^{7}	7^{7}
5	(Germany) L Siegemund	6	6^{2}	6^{3}

Second round
(Germany) T Maria	6	6
Q	A Zakharova	2	1
(Czech Republic) T Valentová	6	5	6
Q	(Australia) A Tomljanović	2	7	4
3	(Latvia) J Ostapenko	3	6	6
(Hungary) P Udvardy	6	1	2
Q	(Turkey) Z Sönmez	w/o
(Czech Republic) S Bejlek

Quarterfinals
(Germany) T Maria	6	7
(Czech Republic) T Valentová	3	5
3	(Latvia) J Ostapenko	6	6
Q	(Turkey) Z Sönmez	3	0

Semifinals
(Germany) T Maria	6	1
3	(Latvia) J Ostapenko	1	2^{r}

=== Bottom half ===
First round
6	(Indonesia) J Tjen	5	7^{7}	3
(United States) C McNally	7	6^{5}	6
(Australia) M Joint	6^{2}	4
Q	(Colombia) E Arango	7^{7}	6
(Croatia) A Ružić	6^{6}	6	6^{4}
LL	(Croatia) P Marčinko	7^{8}	4	7^{7}
Q	(Australia) K Birrell	6	7^{8}
4	(Czech Republic) B Krejčiková	3	6^{6}
7	(United States) M Kessler	6	7^{7}
(Australia) D Kasatkina	3	6^{3}
Q	(Ukraine) D Snigur	6^{1}	5
(Ukraine) A Kalinina	7^{7}	7
WC	(United Kingdom) A Dudeney	0	3
(Spain) J Bouzas Maneiro	6	6
(Australia) T Gibson	4	4
2	(United States) M Keys	6	6

Second round
(United States) C McNally	6	6
Q	(Colombia) E Arango	3	0
LL	(Croatia) P Marčinko	6	6
Q	(Australia) K Birrell	1	4
7	(United States) M Kessler	6	6
(Ukraine) A Kalinina	4	3
(Spain) J Bouzas Maneiro	0	1
2	(United States) M Keys	6	6

Quarterfinals
(United States) C McNally	3	6	4
LL	(Croatia) P Marčinko	6	4	6
7	(United States) M Kessler	3	1
2	(United States) M Keys	6	6

Semifinals
LL	(Croatia) P Marčinko	1	0^{r}
2	(United States) M Keys	6	0

== Qualifying ==
=== Seeds ===
1. (Ukraine) Oleksandra Oliynykova (first round)
2. (Croatia) Petra Marčinko (qualifying competition, lucky loser)
3. (Turkey) Zeynep Sönmez (qualified)
4. (United States) Peyton Stearns (qualifying competition)
5. (Uzbekistan) Kamilla Rakhimova (first round)
6. (Colombia) Camila Osorio (first round)
7. (Australia) Kimberly Birrell (qualified)
8. (Ukraine) Daria Snigur (qualified)
9. (United States) Alycia Parks (first round)
10. (France) Elsa Jacquemot (qualifying competition)
11. (Austria) Lilli Tagger (first round)
12. (Slovenia) Veronika Erjavec (qualifying competition)

=== Qualifiers ===
1. (Colombia) Emiliana Arango
2. (Ukraine) Daria Snigur
3. (Turkey) Zeynep Sönmez
4. (Australia) Kimberly Birrell
5. Anastasia Zakharova
6. (Australia) Ajla Tomljanović

=== Lucky loser ===
1. (Croatia) Petra Marčinko

=== Qualifying draw ===
==== First qualifier ====
First round
1	(Ukraine) Oleksandra Oliynykova	0	2
WC	(United Kingdom) Sofia Johnson	6	6
(Colombia) Emiliana Arango	4	6	7
9	(United States) Alycia Parks	6	3	5

Qualifying competition
WC	(United Kingdom) Sofia Johnson	3	2
(Colombia) Emiliana Arango	6	6

==== Second qualifier ====
First round
2	(Croatia) Petra Marčinko	6	6^{4}	6
(Switzerland) Simona Waltert	4	7^{7}	4
(United States) Sofia Kenin	3	1
8	(Ukraine) Daria Snigur	6	6

Qualifying competition
2	(Croatia) Petra Marčinko	4	2
8	(Ukraine) Daria Snigur	6	6

==== Third qualifier ====
First round
3	(Turkey) Zeynep Sönmez	6	6
(Belgium) Hanne Vandewinkel	3	4
WC	(United Kingdom) Mimi Xu	7	2	3
10	(France) Elsa Jacquemot	5	6	6

Qualifying competition
3	(Turkey) Zeynep Sönmez	2	6	6
10	(France) Elsa Jacquemot	6	1	3

==== Fourth qualifier ====
First round
4	(United States) Peyton Stearns	7	6
WC	(United Kingdom) Emily Appleton	5	3
WC	(United Kingdom) Indianna Spink	6^{6}	4
7	(Australia) Kimberly Birrell	7^{8}	6

Qualifying competition
4	(United States) Peyton Stearns	5	0
7	(Australia) Kimberly Birrell	7	6

==== Fifth qualifier ====
First round
5	(Uzbekistan) Kamilla Rakhimova	6^{3}	6	1
(Spain) Oksana Selekhmeteva	7^{7}	2	6
Anastasia Zakharova	6	5	7^{9}
11	(Austria) Lilli Tagger	4	7	6^{7}

Qualifying competition
(Spain) Oksana Selekhmeteva	6^{8}	6	6^{7}
Anastasia Zakharova	7^{10}	2	7^{9}

==== Sixth qualifier ====
First round
6	(Colombia) Camila Osorio	2	4
(Australia) Ajla Tomljanović	6	6
(Thailand) Lanlana Tararudee	7	2	6^{5}
12	(Slovenia) Veronika Erjavec	5	6	7^{7}

Qualifying competition
(Australia) Ajla Tomljanović	6	7
12	(Slovenia) Veronika Erjavec	1	5
