= 2024 Eastbourne International =

- Date: 24–29 June
- Edition: 13th (men); 49th (women)
- Category: ATP 250 (men); WTA 500 (women)
- Draw: 28S / 16D (men & women)
- Prize money: €740,160 (men) $922,573 (women)
- Surface: Grass
- Location: Eastbourne, United Kingdom
- Venue: Devonshire Park LTC

Champions

Men's singles
- (United States) Taylor Fritz

Women's singles
- Daria Kasatkina

Men's doubles
- (United Kingdom) Neal Skupski / (New Zealand) Michael Venus

Women's doubles
- (Ukraine) Lyudmyla Kichenok / (Latvia) Jeļena Ostapenko
- Eastbourne International

The 2024 Eastbourne International (also known as the Rothesay International Eastbourne for sponsorship reasons) was a combined men's and women's tennis tournament played on outdoor grass courts. It was the 49th edition of the event for the women and the 13th edition for the men. The tournament is classified as a WTA 500 tournament on the 2024 WTA Tour and as an ATP 250 tournament on the 2024 ATP Tour. The tournament took place at the Devonshire Park Lawn Tennis Club in Eastbourne, United Kingdom between 24 June and 29 June 2024.

== Champions ==
=== Men's singles ===
- (United States) Taylor Fritz def. (Australia) Max Purcell, 6–4, 6–3

=== Women's singles ===
- Daria Kasatkina def. (Canada) Leylah Fernandez, 6–3, 6–4

=== Men's doubles ===
- (United Kingdom) Neal Skupski / (New Zealand) Michael Venus def. (Australia) Matthew Ebden / (Australia) John Peers, 4–6, 7–6^{(7–2)}, [11–9]

=== Women's doubles ===
- (Ukraine) Lyudmyla Kichenok / (Latvia) Jeļena Ostapenko def. (Canada) Gabriela Dabrowski / (New Zealand) Erin Routliffe, 5–7, 7–6^{(7–2)}, [10–8]

== ATP singles main draw entrants ==
=== Seeds ===
Country	Player	Rank^{1}	Seed
USA	Taylor Fritz	12	1
~~USA~~	~~Tommy Paul~~	~~13~~	~~2~~
KAZ	Alexander Bublik	17	3
ARG	Sebastián Báez	19	4
ARG	Francisco Cerúndolo	26	5
ARG	Mariano Navone	29	6
ARG	Tomás Martín Etcheverry	32	7
~~ESP~~	~~Alejandro Davidovich Fokina~~	~~33~~	~~8~~

- ^{1} Rankings are as of 17 June 2024.

=== Other entrants ===
The following players received wildcards into the main draw:

- (United Kingdom) Liam Broady
- (United Kingdom) Jacob Fearnley
- (United Kingdom) Billy Harris

The following player received entry using a protected ranking:

- ~~(Japan) Kei Nishikori~~

The following players received entry from the qualifying draw:

- (Australia) James McCabe
- (Japan) Yoshihito Nishioka
- (Australia) Max Purcell
- (China) Shang Juncheng

The following player received entry as lucky losers:

- (United Kingdom) Charles Broom
- (United Kingdom) Giles Hussey
- (United Kingdom) Henry Searle
- (Australia) Aleksandar Vukic

=== Withdrawals ===
- (Spain) Alejandro Davidovich Fokina → replaced by (United Kingdom) Henry Searle
- (United Kingdom) Jack Draper → replaced by (Brazil) Thiago Seyboth Wild
- (France) Arthur Fils → replaced by (France) Arthur Rinderknech
- (Germany) Dominik Koepfer → replaced by (Australia) Aleksandar Vukic
- (Czech Republic) Jiří Lehečka → replaced by (Serbia) Miomir Kecmanović
- (Japan) Kei Nishikori → replaced by (United Kingdom) Giles Hussey
- (United States) Tommy Paul → replaced by (United Kingdom) Charles Broom

== ATP doubles main draw entrants ==
=== Seeds ===
Country	Player	Country	Player	Rank^{1}	Seed
USA	Rajeev Ram	GBR	Joe Salisbury	11	1
ESA	Marcelo Arévalo	CRO	Mate Pavić	16	2
AUS	Matthew Ebden	AUS	John Peers	42	3
GBR	Neal Skupski	NZL	Michael Venus	42	4

- ^{1} Rankings are as of 17 June 2024.

=== Other entrants ===
The following pairs received wildcards into the doubles main draw:

- (United Kingdom) Liam Broady / (United Kingdom) Billy Harris
- ~~(United Kingdom) Charles Broom / (United Kingdom) Arthur Fery~~

The following pair received entry as alternates:

- (Argentina) Guido Andreozzi / (New Zealand) Marcus Daniell

=== Withdrawals ===
- (United Kingdom) Charles Broom / (United Kingdom) Arthur Fery → replaced by (Argentina) Guido Andreozzi / (New Zealand) Marcus Daniell
- (Croatia) Ivan Dodig / (United States) Austin Krajicek → replaced by (United States) Austin Krajicek / (United States) Mackenzie McDonald
- (Ecuador) Gonzalo Escobar / (Kazakhstan) Aleksandr Nedovyesov → replaced by (Romania) Victor Vlad Cornea / (Kazakhstan) Aleksandr Nedovyesov

== WTA singles main draw entrants ==
=== Seeds ===
Country	Player	Rank^{1}	Seed
~~KAZ~~	~~Elena Rybakina~~	~~4~~	~~1~~
USA	Jessica Pegula	5	2
ITA	Jasmine Paolini	7	3
USA	Madison Keys	12	4
LAT	Jeļena Ostapenko	13	5
	Daria Kasatkina	14	6
CZE	Barbora Krejčiková	25	7
	Anastasia Pavlyuchenkova	26	8

- ^{1} Rankings are as of 17 June 2024.

=== Other entrants ===
The following players received wildcards into the main draw:

- (United Kingdom) Harriet Dart
- (United Kingdom) Lily Miyazaki
- (United Kingdom) Emma Raducanu

The following player received entry using a protected ranking:

- ~~(Australia) Ajla Tomljanović~~

The following players received entry from the qualifying draw:

- Elina Avanesyan
- (Switzerland) Viktorija Golubic
- (Ukraine) Anhelina Kalinina
- (United States) Ashlyn Krueger
- (Poland) Magda Linette
- (Belgium) Greet Minnen

The following players received entry as lucky losers:

- (United States) Sofia Kenin
- (Croatia) Petra Martić

=== Withdrawals ===
- (United States) Danielle Collins → replaced by (China) Wang Xinyu
- (Kazakhstan) Elena Rybakina → replaced by (United States) Sofia Kenin
- (Australia) Ajla Tomljanović → replaced by (Croatia) Petra Martić

== WTA doubles main draw entrants ==
=== Seeds ===
Country	Player	Country	Player	Rank^{1}	Seed
CAN	Gabriela Dabrowski	NZL	Erin Routliffe	8	1
CZE	Barbora Krejčiková	GER	Laura Siegemund	29	2
NED	Demi Schuurs	BRA	Luisa Stefani	29	3
ITA	Sara Errani	ITA	Jasmine Paolini	29	4

- ^{1} Rankings are as of 17 June 2024.
