= 2026 Eastbourne Open – Women's doubles =

Women's doubles
- 2026 Eastbourne Open

Final
- Champions: (Canada) Gabriela Dabrowski (Brazil) Luisa Stefani
- Runners-up: (Czech Republic) Jesika Malečková (Czech Republic) Miriam Škoch
- Score: 6–1, 6–4

Details
- Draw: 16
- Seeds: 4

Events
Singles	men	women
Doubles	men	women
- Eastbourne International

Gabriela Dabrowski and Luisa Stefani won the women's doubles title at the 2026 Eastbourne Open, defeating Jesika Malečková and Miriam Škoch in the final, 6–1, 6–4.

Marie Bouzková and Anna Danilina were the reigning champions, but did not participate this year.

== Seeds ==
1. (Canada) Gabriela Dabrowski / (Brazil) Luisa Stefani (champions)
2. (Italy) Sara Errani / (Italy) Jasmine Paolini (first round)
3. (United States) Sofia Kenin / (Latvia) Jeļena Ostapenko (quarterfinals, withdrew)
4. (United States) Asia Muhammad / (Hungary) Fanny Stollár (semifinals)

== Draw ==
Key

- Q = Qualifier
- WC = Wild card
- LL = Lucky loser
- Alt = Alternate
- ITF = ITF entry
- PR = Protected ranking
- SR = Special ranking
- SE = Special exempt
- JE = Junior exempt
- JR = Junior Accelerator Programme entrant
- CO = College Accelerator Programme entrant
- NG = Next Gen Accelerator Program entrant
- w/o = Walkover
- r = Retired
- d = Defaulted

=== Draw ===
First round
1	(Canada) G Dabrowski (Brazil) L Stefani	6	6
(Czech Republic) A Dețiuc; I Khromacheva	3	2
(Japan) M Kato (Uzbekistan) K Rakhimova	6	7
WC	(United Kingdom) E Appleton (United Kingdom) A Dudeney	2	5
4	(United States) A Muhammad (Hungary) F Stollár	3	6	[10]
WC	(United Kingdom) F Christie (United Kingdom) E Silva	6	3	[5]
PR	(Estonia) I Neel (Mexico) G Olmos	3	7	[10]
(Japan) E Hozumi (Chinese Taipei) F-h Wu	6	5	[3]
PR	(Brazil) I Martins (Spain) S Sorribes Tormo	6^{6}	4
(Czech Republic) J Malečková (Czech Republic) M Škoch	7^{8}	6
(Ukraine) N Kichenok (Japan) M Ninomiya	4	3
3	(United States) S Kenin (Latvia) J Ostapenko	6	6
M Kozyreva (Poland) K Piter	6	4	[4]
(Netherlands) I Haverlag (United Kingdom) M Lumsden	3	6	[10]
Alt	(Hong Kong) E Chong (Indonesia) J Tjen	7^{7}	6
2	(Italy) S Errani (Italy) J Paolini	6^{2}	3

Quarterfinals
1	(Canada) G Dabrowski (Brazil) L Stefani	6	7^{7}
(Japan) M Kato (Uzbekistan) K Rakhimova	3	6^{5}
4	(United States) A Muhammad (Hungary) F Stollár	7	6
PR	(Estonia) I Neel (Mexico) G Olmos	5	3
(Czech Republic) J Malečková (Czech Republic) M Škoch	w/o
3	(United States) S Kenin (Latvia) J Ostapenko
(Netherlands) I Haverlag (United Kingdom) M Lumsden	6	3	[10]
Alt	(Hong Kong) E Chong (Indonesia) J Tjen	4	6	[7]

Semifinals
1	(Canada) G Dabrowski (Brazil) L Stefani	6	6
4	(United States) A Muhammad (Hungary) F Stollár	3	4
(Czech Republic) J Malečková (Czech Republic) M Škoch	7^{7}	6
(Netherlands) I Haverlag (United Kingdom) M Lumsden	6^{2}	4

Final
1	(Canada) G Dabrowski (Brazil) L Stefani	6	6
(Czech Republic) J Malečková (Czech Republic) M Škoch	1	4
