= 2024 Eastbourne International – Women's doubles =

Women's doubles
- 2024 Eastbourne International

Final
- Champions: (Ukraine) Lyudmyla Kichenok (Latvia) Jeļena Ostapenko
- Runners-up: (Canada) Gabriela Dabrowski (New Zealand) Erin Routliffe
- Score: 5–7, 7–6^{(7–2)}, [10–8]

Events
Singles	men	women
Doubles	men	women
← 2023 ·	Eastbourne International	· 2025 →

Lyudmyla Kichenok and Jeļena Ostapenko won the women's doubles title at the 2024 Eastbourne International, defeating Gabriela Dabrowski and Erin Routliffe in the final, 5–7, 7–6^{(7–2)}, [10–8].

Desirae Krawczyk and Demi Schuurs were the reigning champions, but chose not to compete together this year. Krawczyk partnered Caroline Dolehide, but lost in the first round to Guo Hanyu and Jiang Xinyu. Schuurs partnered Luisa Stefani, but lost in the first round to Harriet Dart and Maia Lumsden.

== Seeds ==
1. (Canada) Gabriela Dabrowski / (New Zealand) Erin Routliffe (final)
2. (Czech Republic) Barbora Krejčiková / (Germany) Laura Siegemund (quarterfinals)
3. (Netherlands) Demi Schuurs / (Brazil) Luisa Stefani (first round)
4. (Italy) Sara Errani / (Italy) Jasmine Paolini (first round)

== Draw ==
=== Key ===
- Q = Qualifier
- WC = Wild card
- LL = Lucky loser
- Alt = Alternate
- ITF = ITF entry
- PR = Protected ranking
- SR = Special ranking
- SE = Special exempt
- JE = Junior exempt
- JR = Junior Accelerator Programme entrant
- CO = College Accelerator Programme entrant
- NG = Next Gen Accelerator Program entrant
- w/o = Walkover
- r = Retired
- d = Defaulted

=== Draw ===
First round
1	(Canada) G Dabrowski (New Zealand) E Routliffe	6	6
(Czech Republic) M Kolodziejová (Czech Republic) A Sisková	3	2
(China) H Guo (China) X Jiang	6	7^{7}
(United States) C Dolehide (United States) D Krawczyk	4	6^{5}
4	(Italy) S Errani (Italy) J Paolini	6	4	[9]
(United States) A Muhammad (Indonesia) A Sutjiadi	3	6	[11]
(Spain) C Bucșa (Japan) M Ninomiya	6	6
(Czech Republic) M Bouzková (Poland) M Linette	4	4
(China) Xiy Wang (China) Y Wang	3	3
(Chinese Taipei) S-w Hsieh (United States) S Stephens	6	6
(United Kingdom) H Dart (United Kingdom) M Lumsden	7	6
3	(Netherlands) D Schuurs (Brazil) L Stefani	5	4
(France) E Lechemia (Belgium) K Zimmermann	1	2
(Ukraine) L Kichenok (Latvia) J Ostapenko	6	6
(Canada) L Fernandez (Japan) E Shibahara	4	3
2	(Czech Republic) B Krejčiková (Germany) L Siegemund	6	6

Quarterfinals
1	(Canada) G Dabrowski (New Zealand) E Routliffe	7^{7}	6
(China) H Guo (China) X Jiang	6^{5}	3
(United States) A Muhammad (Indonesia) A Sutjiadi	2	7^{7}	[7]
(Spain) C Bucșa (Japan) M Ninomiya	6	6^{3}	[10]
(Chinese Taipei) S-w Hsieh (United States) S Stephens	1	6	[1]
(United Kingdom) H Dart (United Kingdom) M Lumsden	6	3	[10]
(Ukraine) L Kichenok (Latvia) J Ostapenko	6	6
2	(Czech Republic) B Krejčiková (Germany) L Siegemund	3	4

Semifinals
1	(Canada) G Dabrowski (New Zealand) E Routliffe	6^{2}	6	[10]
(Spain) C Bucșa (Japan) M Ninomiya	7^{7}	4	[8]
(United Kingdom) H Dart (United Kingdom) M Lumsden	1	2
(Ukraine) L Kichenok (Latvia) J Ostapenko	6	6

Final
1	(Canada) G Dabrowski (New Zealand) E Routliffe	7	6^{2}	[8]
(Ukraine) L Kichenok (Latvia) J Ostapenko	5	7^{7}	[10]
