= 2024 Eastbourne International – Women's singles =

Women's singles
- 2024 Eastbourne International

Final
- Champion: Daria Kasatkina
- Runner-up: (Canada) Leylah Fernandez
- Score: 6–3, 6–4

Details
- Draw: 28
- Seeds: 8

Events
Singles	men	women
Doubles	men	women
← 2023 ·	Eastbourne International	· 2025 →

Daria Kasatkina defeated Leylah Fernandez in the final, 6–3, 6–4 to win the women's singles title at the 2024 Eastbourne International.

Madison Keys was the defending champion, but lost in the semifinals to Fernandez.

== Seeds ==
The top four seeds received a bye into the second round.

1. (Kazakhstan) Elena Rybakina (withdrew)
2. (United States) Jessica Pegula (second round)
3. (Italy) Jasmine Paolini (semifinals)
4. (United States) Madison Keys (semifinals)
5. (Latvia) Jeļena Ostapenko (second round)
6. Daria Kasatkina (champion)
7. (Czech Republic) Barbora Krejčíková (first round)
8. Anastasia Pavlyuchenkova (first round)

== Draw ==
=== Key ===
- Q = Qualifier
- WC = Wild card
- LL = Lucky loser
- Alt = Alternate
- ITF = ITF entry
- PR = Protected ranking
- SR = Special ranking
- SE = Special exempt
- JE = Junior exempt
- JR = Junior Accelerator Programme entrant
- CO = College Accelerator Programme entrant
- NG = Next Gen Accelerator Program entrant
- w/o = Walkover
- r = Retired
- d = Defaulted

=== Finals ===
Semifinals
(Canada) Leylah Fernandez	6	3	6
4	(United States) Madison Keys	3	6	3
3	(Italy) Jasmine Paolini	6	5	3
6	Daria Kasatkina	3	7	6

Final
(Canada) Leylah Fernandez	3	4
6	Daria Kasatkina	6	6

=== Top half ===
First round
WC	(United Kingdom) H Dart	7	6^{7}	6
(Czech Republic) M Bouzková	5	7^{9}	4
Q	(United States) A Krueger	6	6^{7}	7
Q	(Switzerland) V Golubic	1	7^{9}	5
(Canada) L Fernandez	6	3	6
7	(Czech Republic) B Krejčíková	2	6	2
(Romania) S Cîrstea	3	2
Q	(Ukraine) A Kalinina	6	6
(Czech Republic) K Muchová	3
Q	E Avanesyan	1^{r}
Q	(Poland) M Linette	1	7^{7}	6
8	A Pavlyuchenkova	6	6^{4}	4

Second round
LL	(United States) S Kenin	3	7^{7}	0
WC	(United Kingdom) H Dart	6	6^{3}	6
Q	(United States) A Krueger	2	1
(Canada) L Fernandez	6	6
4	(United States) M Keys	7^{7}	6
Q	(Ukraine) A Kalinina	6^{5}	1
(Czech Republic) K Muchová	6	6
Q	(Poland) M Linette	4	1

Quarterfinals
WC	(United Kingdom) H Dart	2	1
(Canada) L Fernandez	6	6
4	(United States) M Keys	w/o
(Czech Republic) K Muchová

Semifinals
(Canada) L Fernandez	6	3	6
4	(United States) M Keys	3	6	3

=== Bottom half ===
First round
5	(Latvia) J Ostapenko	7^{7}	6
Q	(Belgium) G Minnen	6^{3}	1
(United Kingdom) K Boulter	6	7^{10}
LL	(Croatia) P Martić	1	6^{8}
WC	(United Kingdom) L Miyazaki	1	2
(Belgium) E Mertens	6	6
6	D Kasatkina	6	6
(China) Xin Wang	4	2
(China) Y Yuan	6	6
A Potapova	4	6^{r}
(United States) S Stephens	4	0
WC	(United Kingdom) E Raducanu	6	6

Second round
5	(Latvia) J Ostapenko	4	5
(United Kingdom) K Boulter	6	7
(Belgium) E Mertens	2^{r}
3	(Italy) J Paolini	5
6	D Kasatkina	3	6	6
(China) Y Yuan	6	4	0
WC	(United Kingdom) E Raducanu	4	7^{8}	7
2	(United States) J Pegula	6	6^{6}	5

Quarterfinals
(United Kingdom) K Boulter	1	6^{0}
3	(Italy) J Paolini	6	7^{7}
6	D Kasatkina	6	6
WC	(United Kingdom) E Raducanu	2	2

Semifinals
3	(Italy) J Paolini	6	5	3
6	D Kasatkina	3	7	6

== Qualifying ==
=== Seeds ===
1. (Poland) Magda Linette (qualified)
2. (United States) Sofia Kenin (qualifying competition, lucky loser)
3. (Ukraine) Anhelina Kalinina (qualified)
4. (Romania) Ana Bogdan (first round)
5. (China) Wang Xiyu (first round)
6. (Poland) Magdalena Fręch (first round)
7. (China) Zhu Lin (withdrew)
8. (United States) Caroline Dolehide (first round)
9. (Spain) Cristina Bucșa (first round)
10. (Denmark) Clara Tauson (first round)
11. (United States) Ashlyn Krueger (qualified)
12. (Germany) Laura Siegemund (first round)

=== Qualifiers ===
1. (Poland) Magda Linette
2. (Switzerland) Viktorija Golubic
3. (Ukraine) Anhelina Kalinina
4. (United States) Ashlyn Krueger
5. Elina Avanesyan
6. (Belgium) Greet Minnen

=== Lucky losers ===
1. (Croatia) Petra Martić
2. (United States) Sofia Kenin

=== Draw ===
==== First qualifier ====
First round
1	(Poland) Magda Linette	6	6
(China) Wang Yafan	3	3
WC	(United Kingdom) Ranah Stoiber	6	7
9	(Spain) Cristina Bucșa	2	5

Qualifying competition
1	(Poland) Magda Linette	6	4	6
WC	(United Kingdom) Ranah Stoiber	3	6	2

==== Second qualifier ====
First round
2	(United States) Sofia Kenin	6	6
(Australia) Daria Saville	4	2
(Switzerland) Viktorija Golubic	6	7
8	(United States) Caroline Dolehide	1	5

Qualifying competition
2	(United States) Sofia Kenin	1	0
(Switzerland) Viktorija Golubic	6	6

==== Third qualifier ====
First round
3	(Ukraine) Anhelina Kalinina	6	6
WC	(United Kingdom) Sarah Beth Grey	1	3
(United States) Lauren Davis	6	6
12	(Germany) Laura Siegemund	4	4

Qualifying competition
3	(Ukraine) Anhelina Kalinina	7^{7}	6
(United States) Lauren Davis	6^{2}	4

==== Fourth qualifier ====
First round
4	(Romania) Ana Bogdan	4	6	2
WC	(United Kingdom) Ella McDonald	6	4	6
WC	(United Kingdom) Eden Silva	3	5
11	(United States) Ashlyn Krueger	6	7

Qualifying competition
WC	(United Kingdom) Ella McDonald	4	0
11	(United States) Ashlyn Krueger	6	6

==== Fifth qualifier ====
First round
5	(China) Wang Xiyu	6^{6}	2
(Croatia) Petra Martić	7^{8}	6
Elina Avanesyan	7^{7}	6
10	(Denmark) Clara Tauson	6^{1}	2

Qualifying competition
(Croatia) Petra Martić	3	4
Elina Avanesyan	6	6

==== Sixth qualifier ====
First round
6	(Poland) Magdalena Fręch	6	4	5
(Colombia) Camila Osorio	2	6	7
(Japan) Moyuka Uchijima	5	3
Alt	(Belgium) Greet Minnen	7	6

Qualifying competition
(Colombia) Camila Osorio
Alt	(Belgium) Greet Minnen	w/o
