= 2024 Eastbourne International – Men's singles =

Men's singles
- 2024 Eastbourne International

Final
- Champion: (United States) Taylor Fritz
- Runner-up: (Australia) Max Purcell
- Score: 6–4, 6–3

Details
- Draw: 28
- Seeds: 8

Events
Singles	men	women
Doubles	men	women
- Eastbourne International

Taylor Fritz defeated Max Purcell in the final, 6–4, 6–3 to win the singles tennis title at the 2024 Eastbourne International. It was Fritz's third Eastbourne International title.

Francisco Cerúndolo was the defending champion, but lost in the first round to Marcos Giron.

== Seeds ==
The top four seeds received a bye into the second round.

1. (United States) Taylor Fritz (champion)
2. (United States) Tommy Paul (withdrew)
3. (Kazakhstan) Alexander Bublik (second round)
4. (Argentina) Sebastián Báez (second round)
5. (Argentina) Francisco Cerúndolo (first round)
6. (Argentina) Mariano Navone (first round)
7. (Argentina) Tomás Martín Etcheverry (first round)
8. (Spain) Alejandro Davidovich Fokina (withdrew)

== Draw ==
Key

- Q = Qualifier
- WC = Wild card
- LL = Lucky loser
- Alt = Alternate
- ITF = ITF entry
- PR = Protected ranking
- SR = Special ranking
- SE = Special exempt
- JE = Junior exempt
- JR = Junior Accelerator Programme entrant
- CO = College Accelerator Programme entrant
- NG = Next Gen Accelerator Program entrant
- w/o = Walkover
- r = Retired
- d = Defaulted

=== Finals ===
Semifinals
1	(United States) Taylor Fritz	7^{7}	7^{7}
LL	(Australia) Aleksandar Vukic	6^{5}	6^{4}
Q	(Australia) Max Purcell	6	4	6
WC	(United Kingdom) Billy Harris	4	6	4

Final
1	(United States) Taylor Fritz	6	6
Q	(Australia) Max Purcell	4	3

=== Top half ===
First round
Q	(Australia) J McCabe	4	4
(Brazil) T Seyboth Wild	6	6
(United Kingdom) C Norrie	6^{9}	3
(Finland) E Ruusuvuori	7^{11}	6
Q	(China) J Shang	7	3	7^{7}
7	(Argentina) TM Etcheverry	5	6	6^{4}
LL	(Australia) A Vukic	6	6
(Hungary) F Marozsán	2	4
WC	(United Kingdom) L Broady	3	4
Q	(Japan) Y Nishioka	6	6
(United States) M Giron	7^{7}	7^{7}
5	(Argentina) F Cerúndolo	6^{5}	6^{4}

Second round
1	(United States) T Fritz	7^{7}	6
(Brazil) T Seyboth Wild	6^{4}	3
(Finland) E Ruusuvuori	6	3	4
Q	(China) J Shang	4	6	6
3	(Kazakhstan) A Bublik	4	4
LL	(Australia) A Vukic	6	6
Q	(Japan) Y Nishioka	6^{8}	6	6
(United States) M Giron	7^{10}	4	2

Quarterfinals
1	(United States) T Fritz	7^{7}	7^{7}
Q	(China) J Shang	6^{5}	6^{5}
LL	(Australia) A Vukic	6	3	7^{7}
Q	(Japan) Y Nishioka	3	6	6^{5}

Semifinals
1	(United States) T Fritz	7^{7}	7^{7}
LL	(Australia) A Vukic	6^{5}	6^{4}

=== Bottom half ===
First round
LL	(United Kingdom) H Searle	3	2
(Italy) L Sonego	6	6
Q	(Australia) M Purcell	6	4	6
(Serbia) L Djere	1	6	3
(Serbia) M Kecmanović	6	7^{7}
(China) Z Zhang	2	6^{2}
6	(Argentina) M Navone	4	2
LL	(United Kingdom) G Hussey	6	6
(France) A Rinderknech	4	5
(Italy) F Cobolli	6	7
WC	(United Kingdom) B Harris	6	7^{9}
WC	(United Kingdom) J Fearnley	4	6^{7}

Second round
(Italy) L Sonego	4	4
Q	(Australia) M Purcell	6	6
(Serbia) M Kecmanović	6	6
4	(Argentina) S Báez	3	2
LL	(United Kingdom) G Hussey	6	3	4
(Italy) F Cobolli	4	6	6
WC	(United Kingdom) B Harris	3	6	6
LL	(United Kingdom) C Broom	6	2	2

Quarterfinals
Q	(Australia) M Purcell	6	7^{7}
(Serbia) M Kecmanović	3	6^{4}
(Italy) F Cobolli	7^{7}	6^{4}	2
WC	(United Kingdom) B Harris	6^{3}	7^{7}	6

Semifinals
Q	(Australia) M Purcell	6	4	6
WC	(United Kingdom) B Harris	4	6	4

== Qualifying ==
=== Seeds ===
1. (United States) Mackenzie McDonald (first round)
2. (Australia) Aleksandar Vukic (qualifying competition, lucky loser)
3. (United States) Aleksandar Kovacevic (first round)
4. (France) Arthur Cazaux (first round)
5. (China) Shang Juncheng (qualified)
6. (Australia) Max Purcell (qualified)
7. (Japan) Yoshihito Nishioka (qualified)
8. (Argentina) Francisco Comesaña (first round)

=== Qualifiers ===
1. (Australia) James McCabe
2. (Japan) Yoshihito Nishioka
3. (Australia) Max Purcell
4. (China) Shang Juncheng

=== Lucky losers ===
1. (Australia) Aleksandar Vukic
2. (United Kingdom) Charles Broom
3. (United Kingdom) Giles Hussey
4. (United Kingdom) Henry Searle

=== Qualifying draw ===
==== First qualifier ====
First round
1	(United States) Mackenzie McDonald	4	5
Alt	(Australia) James McCabe	6	7
(United Kingdom) Charles Broom	6	3	7
8	(Argentina) Francisco Comesaña	4	6	5

Qualifying competition
Alt	(Australia) James McCabe	6^{1}	7^{7}	7
(United Kingdom) Charles Broom	7^{7}	6^{4}	5

==== Second qualifier ====
First round
2	(Australia) Aleksandar Vukic	6	6
Alt	(Switzerland) Antoine Bellier	4	3
(United Kingdom) Arthur Fery	3	3
7	(Japan) Yoshihito Nishioka	6	6

Qualifying competition
2	(Australia) Aleksandar Vukic	6^{3}	4
7	(Japan) Yoshihito Nishioka	7^{7}	6

==== Third qualifier ====
First round
3	(United States) Aleksandar Kovacevic	7^{7}	6^{3}	3
WC	(United Kingdom) Henry Searle	6^{4}	7^{7}	6
(United Kingdom) Jan Choinski	6^{4}	4
6	(Australia) Max Purcell	7^{7}	6

Qualifying competition
WC	(United Kingdom) Henry Searle	6^{6}	4
6	(Australia) Max Purcell	7^{8}	6

==== Fourth qualifier ====
First round
4	(France) Arthur Cazaux	6	2	1
WC	(United Kingdom) Giles Hussey	3	6	6
Alt	(Germany) Oscar Otte	7^{7}	2	2
5	(China) Shang Juncheng	6^{3}	6	6

Qualifying competition
WC	(United Kingdom) Giles Hussey	5	6^{5}
5	(China) Shang Juncheng	7	7^{7}
