= 2026 Eastbourne Open =

- Date: 22–28 June
- Edition: 15th (men); 51st (women)
- Category: ATP 250 (men); WTA 250 (women)
- Draw: 28S / 16D (men); 32S / 16D (women)
- Prize money: €773,465 (men) $499,000 (women)
- Surface: Grass
- Location: Eastbourne, United Kingdom
- Venue: Devonshire Park LTC

Champions

Men's singles
- (Belgium) Zizou Bergs

Women's singles
- (United States) Madison Keys

Men's doubles
- (Monaco) Hugo Nys / (France) Édouard Roger-Vasselin

Women's doubles
- (Canada) Gabriela Dabrowski / (Brazil) Luisa Stefani
- Eastbourne International

The 2026 Eastbourne Open, known as the Lexus Eastbourne Open (for sponsorship reasons) was a combined men's and women's tennis tournament played on outdoor grass courts. It was the 51st edition of the event for the women and the 15th edition for the men. The tournament was classified as a WTA 250 tournament on the 2026 WTA Tour and as an ATP 250 tournament on the 2026 ATP Tour. The tournament took place at the Devonshire Park Lawn Tennis Club in Eastbourne, United Kingdom between 22 and 28 June 2026. Rain on Saturday 27 June caused the men's singles and the women's doubles finals to be postponed to Sunday 28 June.

== Champions ==
=== Men's singles ===
- (Belgium) Zizou Bergs def. (France) Ugo Humbert, 3–6, 6–1, 6–4

=== Women's singles ===
- (United States) Madison Keys def. (Germany) Tatjana Maria, 7–5, 6–4

=== Men's doubles ===
- (Monaco) Hugo Nys / (France) Édouard Roger-Vasselin def. (Argentina) Guido Andreozzi / (France) Manuel Guinard, 6–3, 4–6, [10–8]

=== Women's doubles ===
- (Canada) Gabriela Dabrowski / (Brazil) Luisa Stefani def. (Czech Republic) Jesika Malečková / (Czech Republic) Miriam Škoch, 6–1, 6–4

== ATP singles main draw entrants ==
=== Seeds ===
| Country | Player | Rank^{1} | Seed |
|---|---|---|---|
| ~~USA~~ | ~~Taylor Fritz~~ | ~~9~~ | ~~1~~ |
| ~~BRA~~ | ~~João Fonseca~~ | ~~25~~ | ~~2~~ |
| ~~ARG~~ | ~~Francisco Cerúndolo~~ | ~~27~~ | ~~3~~ |
| ARG | Tomás Martín Etcheverry | 30 | 4 |
| ~~USA~~ | ~~Brandon Nakashima~~ | ~~32~~ | ~~5~~ |
| FRA | Ugo Humbert | 33 | 6 |
| ESP | Jaume Munar | 43 | 7 |
| ARG | Juan Manuel Cerúndolo | 45 | 8 |

- ^{1} Rankings are as of 15 June 2026.

=== Other entrants ===
The following players received wildcards into the main draw:

- ~~(United Kingdom) Jacob Fearnley~~
- (United Kingdom) Arthur Fery
- (United Kingdom) Jack Pinnington Jones

The following players received entry from the qualifying draw:

- (Italy) Matteo Arnaldi
- (United Kingdom) Jan Choinski
- (United Kingdom) Giles Hussey
- (Australia) Aleksandar Vukic

The following players received entry as lucky losers:

- (United Kingdom) Felix Gill
- (United States) Marcos Giron
- (France) Quentin Halys
- (United Kingdom) Toby Samuel
- (United Kingdom) Hamish Stewart
- (Argentina) Marco Trungelliti

=== Withdrawals ===
- (Belgium) Alexander Blockx → replaced by (United States) Jenson Brooksby
- (Argentina) Francisco Cerúndolo → replaced by (United Kingdom) Toby Samuel
- (United Kingdom) Jacob Fearnley → replaced by (United Kingdom) Hamish Stewart
- (Brazil) João Fonseca → replaced by (France) Quentin Halys
- (United States) Taylor Fritz → replaced by (United Kingdom) Felix Gill
- (Spain) Rafael Jódar → replaced by (Australia) Alexei Popyrin
- (Czech Republic) Tomáš Macháč → replaced by (United States) Aleksandar Kovacevic
- (United States) Brandon Nakashima → replaced by (United States) Marcos Giron
- (France) Arthur Rinderknech → replaced by (Belgium) Raphaël Collignon
- (Argentina) Camilo Ugo Carabelli → replaced by (Argentina) Marco Trungelliti
- (Monaco) Valentin Vacherot → replaced by (Argentina) Thiago Agustín Tirante

== ATP doubles main draw entrants ==
=== Seeds ===
| Country | Player | Country | Player | Rank^{1} | Seed |
|---|---|---|---|---|---|
| GBR | Julian Cash | GBR | Lloyd Glasspool | 12 | 1 |
| USA | Christian Harrison | GBR | Neal Skupski | 20 | 2 |
| ARG | Guido Andreozzi | FRA | Manuel Guinard | 33 | 3 |
| MON | Hugo Nys | FRA | Édouard Roger-Vasselin | 39 | 4 |

- ^{1} Rankings are as of 15 June 2026.

=== Other entrants ===
The following pairs received wildcards into the doubles main draw:

- (United Kingdom) Ben Jones / (United Kingdom) Joshua Paris
- (United Kingdom) David Stevenson / (United Kingdom) Marcus Willis

== WTA singles main draw entrants ==
=== Seeds ===
| Country | Player | Rank^{1} | Seed |
|---|---|---|---|
| ITA | Jasmine Paolini | 14 | 1 |
| USA | Madison Keys | 28 | 2 |
| LAT | Jeļena Ostapenko | 38 | 3 |
| CZE | Barbora Krejčíková | 39 | 4 |
| GER | Laura Siegemund | 42 | 5 |
| INA | Janice Tjen | 43 | 6 |
| USA | McCartney Kessler | 44 | 7 |
| ITA | Elisabetta Cocciaretto | 46 | 8 |

- ^{1} Rankings are as of 15 June 2026.

=== Other entrants ===
The following players received wildcards into the main draw:

- (United Kingdom) Harriet Dart
- (United Kingdom) Alicia Dudeney
- (United Kingdom) Francesca Jones
- (United Kingdom) Hannah Klugman

The following player received entry as a special exempt:

- ~~(Switzerland) Viktorija Golubic~~

The following players received entry from the qualifying draw:

- (Colombia) Emiliana Arango
- (Australia) Kimberly Birrell
- (Ukraine) Daria Snigur
- (Turkey) Zeynep Sönmez
- (Australia) Ajla Tomljanović
- Anastasia Zakharova

The following player received entry as a lucky loser:

- (Croatia) Petra Marčinko

=== Withdrawals ===
- (France) Loïs Boisson → replaced by (Croatia) Antonia Ružić
- (Romania) Jaqueline Cristian → replaced by (Hungary) Panna Udvardy
- (Switzerland) Viktorija Golubic → replaced by (Croatia) Petra Marčinko
- (Czech Republic) Karolína Plíšková → replaced by (United States) Caty McNally
- (Greece) Maria Sakkari → replaced by (Ukraine) Anhelina Kalinina

== WTA doubles main draw entrants ==
=== Seeds ===
| Country | Player | Country | Player | Rank^{1} | Seed |
|---|---|---|---|---|---|
| CAN | Gabriela Dabrowski | BRA | Luisa Stefani | 10 | 1 |
| ITA | Sara Errani | ITA | Jasmine Paolini | 25 | 2 |
| USA | Sofia Kenin | LAT | Jeļena Ostapenko | 43 | 3 |
| USA | Asia Muhammad | HUN | Fanny Stollár | 76 | 4 |

- ^{1} Rankings are as of 15 June 2026.

=== Other entrants ===
The following pairs received wildcards into the doubles main draw:

- (United Kingdom) Emily Appleton / (United Kingdom) Alicia Dudeney
- (United Kingdom) Freya Christie / (United Kingdom) Eden Silva

The following pair received entry as alternates:

- (Hong Kong) Eudice Chong / (Indonesia) Janice Tjen

=== Withdrawals ===
- (Croatia) Darija Jurak Schreiber / (Croatia) Antonia Ružić → replaced by (Hong Kong) Eudice Chong / (Indonesia) Janice Tjen
